= IAAF Cross Country Permit Meetings =

Annual cross country running races

- Sport: Cross country running
- Founded: 1999
- Ceased: 2021
- Continent: Europe, Africa, Asia

The World Athletics Cross Country Permit Meetings were an annual series of independently-run cross country running competitions which were recognised by the International Association of Athletics Federations (IAAF) with permit status. First held in 1999, the meetings could be used to gain qualification to the IAAF World Cross Country Championships. The number of legs in the series varied from around six to twelve meetings per year, with dates spanning the European winter months, from November to February, prior to the World Championships scheduled in March. The series replaced the IAAF World Cross Challenge, which was first held in 1990. The last series was held in 2020–2021, after which point it was replaced by the three-tier World Athletics Cross Country Tour.

== Meetings ==
IAAF Cross Country Permit Meetings
Date	Meeting	Location	Country
10 January 1999	Cross International Zornotza	Amorebieta	Spain
23 January 1999	21st Belfast International Cross Country	Belfast	United Kingdom
30 January 1999	14th Cross Auchan Lille Metropole	Tourcoing	France
21 February 1999	29th Eurocross	Diekirch	Luxembourg
14 March 1999	67th Cinque Mulini	San Vittore Olona	Italy
9 January 2000	40th Cross Internacional Zornotza	Amorebieta	Spain
29 January 2000	15th Cross Auchan Lille Metropole	Tourcoing	France
20 February 2000	30th Eurocross	Diekirch	Luxembourg
27 February 2000	68th Cinque Mulini	San Vittore Olona	Italy
17 December 2000	11th Brussels FORTIS Crosscup	Brussels	Belgium
30 December 2000	The Great North Cross Country	Durham	United Kingdom
7 January 2001	41st Cross Internacional Zornotza	Amorebieta	Spain
14 January 2001	19th Cross Internacional de Italica	Seville	Spain
20 January 2001	Belfast International Cross Country	Belfast	United Kingdom
28 January 2001	16th Cross Auchan Metropole	Tourcoing	France
4 February 2001	25th Almond Blossom Cross Country	Vilamoura	Portugal
18 February 2001	31st Eurocross	Diekirch	Luxembourg
18 February 2001	36th Chiba International Cross Country	Chiba	Japan
24 February 2001	Nairobi International Cross Country	Nairobi	Kenya
4 March 2001	69th Cinque Mulini	San Vittore Olona	Italy
17 November 2002	VODAFONE Cross Internacional Oeiras	Oeiras	Portugal
24 November 2002	XIV Cross Internacional de Llodio	Llodio	Spain
22 December 2002	LOTTO Iris Crosscup	Brussels	Belgium
4 January 2003	Great North Cross Country	Newcastle upon Tyne	United Kingdom
11 January 2003	Belfast International Cross Country	Belfast	United Kingdom
19 January 2003	XXI Cross Internacional de Italica	Seville	Spain
26 January 2003	Cross Auchan Lille Metropole	Tourcoing	France
9 February 2003	27th Almond Blossom Cross Country	Loulé	Portugal
16 February 2003	Eurocross	Diekirch	Luxembourg
16 February 2003	38th Chiba International Cross Country	Chiba	Japan
22 February 2003	Nairobi International Cross Country	Nairobi	Kenya
9 March 2003	71° Cinque Mulini	San Vittore Olona	Italy
16 November 2003	VODAFONE Cross Internacional Oeiras	Oeiras	Portugal
30 November 2003	XV Cross Internacional de Llodio	Llodio	Spain
21 December 2003	LOTTO Iris Crosscup	Brussels	Belgium
3 January 2004	Great North Cross Country	Newcastle upon Tyne	United Kingdom
10 January 2004	Belfast International Cross Country	Belfast	United Kingdom
18 January 2004	XXII Cross Internacional de Italica	Seville	Spain
1 February 2004	Cross Auchan Lille Metropole	Tourcoing	France
13 February 2004	Nairobi International Cross Country	Nairobi	Kenya
15 February 2004	39th Chiba International Cross Country	Chiba	Japan
15 February 2004	Eurocross	Diekirch	Luxembourg
7 March 2004	72° Cinque Mulini	San Vittore Olona	Italy
21 November 2004	VODAFONE Cross Internacional Oeiras	Oeiras	Portugal
28 November 2004	XVI Cross Internacional de Llodio	Llodio	Spain
19 December 2004	LOTTO Iris Crosscup	Brussels	Belgium
8 January 2005	Belfast International Cross Country	Belfast	United Kingdom
15 January 2005	Edinburgh Cross Country	Edinburgh	United Kingdom
16 January 2005	XXIII Cross Internacional de Italica	Seville	Spain
23 January 2005	Cross Auchan Lille Metropole	Tourcoing	France
30 January 2005	Loule Cross Country	Albufeira	Portugal
6 February 2005	73° Cinque Mulini	San Vittore Olona	Italy
12 February 2005	Nairobi International Cross Country	Nairobi	Kenya
13 February 2005	Eurocross	Diekirch	Luxembourg
20 February 2005	40th Chiba International Cross Country	Chiba	Japan
6 March 2005	Fukuoka Cross Country	Fukuoka	Japan
19 November 2005	Sportzone Cross Internacional Oeiras	Oeiras	Portugal
27 November 2005	XVII Cross Internacional de Llodio	Llodio	Spain
18 December 2005	LOTTO Iris Crosscup	Brussels	Belgium
7 January 2006	Belfast International Cross Country	Belfast	United Kingdom
14 January 2006	Edinburgh Cross Country	Edinburgh	United Kingdom
15 January 2006	XXIV Cross Internacional de Italica	Seville	Spain
22 January 2006	Cross Auchan Lille Metropole	Tourcoing	France
29 January 2006	Loule Cross Country	Albufeira	Portugal
5 February 2006	74° Cinque Mulini	San Vittore Olona	Italy
11 February 2006	Nairobi International Cross Country	Nairobi	Kenya
19 February 2006	Eurocross	Diekirch	Luxembourg
5 March 2006	Fukuoka Cross Country	Fukuoka	Japan
19 March 2006	41st Chiba International Cross Country	Chiba	Japan
11 November 2006	Cross Internacional Oeiras	Oeiras	Portugal
26 November 2006	XXIII Cross Internacional de Llodio	Llodio	Spain
17 December 2006	IRIS Lotto Crosscup	Brussels	Belgium
6 January 2007	Belfast International Cross Country	Belfast	United Kingdom
13 January 2007	Edinburgh Cross Country	Edinburgh	United Kingdom
21 January 2007	XXV Cross Internacional de Italica	Seville	Spain
22 January 2007	Cross Auchan Lille Metropole	Tourcoing	France
10 February 2007	IAAF Permit/Tusker National Cross	Mombasa	Kenya
11 February 2007	Eurocross	Diekirch	Luxembourg
25 February 2007	30th Almond Blossom Cross	Albufeira	Portugal
4 March 2007	75° Cinque Mulini	San Vittore Olona	Italy
17 November 2007	Cross Internacional Oeiras	Oeiras	Portugal
25 November 2007	XIII Cross Internacional de Soria	Soria	Spain
23 December 2007	IRIS Lotto Crosscup	Brussels	Belgium
5 January 2008	Belfast International Cross Country	Belfast	United Kingdom
12 January 2008	Edinburgh Cross Country	Edinburgh	United Kingdom
20 January 2008	XXVI Cross Internacional de Italica	Seville	Spain
3 February 2008	76° Cinque Mulini	San Vittore Olona	Italy
10 February 2008	43rd Chiba International Cross Country	Chiba	Japan
17 February 2008	Eurocross	Diekirch	Luxembourg
1 March 2008	IAAF Permit National Cross	Nairobi	Kenya
1 March 2008	Fukuoka Cross Country	Fukuoka	Japan
15 November 2008	Cross Internacional de Oeiras	Oeiras	Portugal
23 November 2008	XV Campo a Través Internacional de Soria	Soria	Spain
3 January 2008	Antrim International Cross Country	Antrim	United Kingdom
10 January 2008	BUPA Great Edinburgh International Cross Country	Edinburgh	United Kingdom
18 January 2008	XXVII Cross Internacional de Italica	Seville	Spain
1 February 2008	77th Cinque Mulini	San Vittore Olona	Italy
15 February 2008	Eurocross	Diekirch	Luxembourg
21 February 2008	IAAF Permit/KCB Nairobi Cross	Nairobi	Kenya
1 March 2008	32nd Almond Blossom Cross	Albufeira	Portugal
7 March 2008	23rd Fukuoka International Cross Country	Fukuoka	Japan
21 November 2008	Cross Internacional de Oeiras	Oeiras	Portugal
29 November 2008	XVI Campo a Través Internacional de Soria	Soria	Spain
20 December 2008	IRIS Lotto Crosscup	Brussels	Belgium
9 January 2010	BUPA Great Edinburgh International Cross Country	Edinburgh	United Kingdom
17 January 2010	XXVIII Cross Internacional de Italica	Seville	Spain
23 January 2010	Belfast International Cross Country	Belfast	United Kingdom
31 January 2010	78th Cinque Mulini	San Vittore Olona	Italy
14 February 2010	44th Chiba International Cross Country	Chiba	Japan
20 February 2010	IAAF Permit/KCB Nairobi Cross	Nairobi	Kenya
27 February 2010	24th Fukuoka International Cross Country	Fukuoka	Japan
28 February 2010	Eurocross	Diekirch	Luxembourg
7 March 2010	33rd Almond Blossom Cross	Albufeira	Portugal
7 November 2010	VII Cross de Atapuerca	Burgos	Spain
13 November 2010	FINIBANCO Cross Internacional de Oeiras	Oeiras	Portugal
19 December 2010	IRIS Lotto Crosscup	Brussels	Belgium
8 January 2011	BUPA Great Edinburgh International Cross Country	Edinburgh	United Kingdom
16 January 2011	XXIX Cross Internacional de Italica	Seville	Spain
22 January 2011	Antrim International Cross Country	Antrim	United Kingdom
6 February 2011	79th Cinque Mulini	San Vittore Olona	Italy
12 February 2011	IAAF Permit/KCB Nairobi Cross	Nairobi	Kenya
13 February 2011	Chiba International Cross Country	Chiba	Japan
26 February 2011	Fukuoka International Cross Country	Fukuoka	Japan
27 February 2011	ING Eurocross	Diekirch	Luxembourg
6 March 2011	34th Almond Blossom Cross	Albufeira	Portugal
13 November 2011	VIII Cross de Atapuerca	Burgos	Spain
20 November 2011	XVII Campo a Traves Internacional de Soria	Soria	Spain
18 December 2011	IRIS Lotto Crosscup Brussels	Brussels	Belgium
6 January 2012	55 Campaccio	San Giorgio su Legnano	Italy
7 January 2012	BUPA Great Edinburgh Cross Country - International Challenge	Edinburgh	United Kingdom
15 January 2012	XXX Cross Internacional de Italica	Seville	Spain
21 January 2012	IAAF Antrim International Cross Country	Antrim	United Kingdom
12 February 2012	ING Eurocross Diekirch	Diekirch	Luxembourg
12 February 2012	47th Chiba International Cross Country Meet	Chiba	Japan
18 February 2012	IAAF Permit/KCB Nairobi Cross	Nairobi	Kenya
26 February 2012	35th Almond Blossom Cross Country	Albufeira	Portugal
18 March 2012	80 Cinque Mulini	San Vittore Olona	Italy
11 November 2012	VIII Cross de Atapuerca	Burgos	Spain
18 November 2012	XVII Campo a Través Internacional de Soria	Soria	Spain
23 December 2012	IRIS Lotto Crosscup Brussels	Brussels	Belgium
5 January 2013	BUPA Great Edinburgh Cross Country	Edinburgh	United Kingdom
6 January 2013	56 Campaccio	San Giorgio su Legnano	Italy
12 January 2013	IAAF Antrim International Cross Country	Antrim	United Kingdom
20 January 2013	XXXII Cross Internacional de Italica	Seville	Spain
27 January 2013	ING Eurocross Diekirch	Diekirch	Luxembourg
3 February 2013	81st Cinque Mulini	San Vittore Olona	Italy
10 February 2013	47th Chiba International Cross Country Meet	Chiba	Japan
16 February 2013	IAAF Permit/KCB Nairobi Cross	Nairobi	Kenya
24 February 2013	36th Almond Blossom Cross Country	Albufeira	Portugal
10 November 2013	Campo a Través Internacional de Soria	Soria	Spain
17 November 2013	X Cross de Atapuerca	Burgos	Spain
22 December 2013	IRIS Lotto Crosscup Brussels	Brussels	Belgium
4 January 2014	IAAF Antrim International Cross Country	Antrim	United Kingdom
6 January 2014	57th Campaccio	San Giorgio su Legnano	Italy
11 January 2014	BUPA Great Edinburgh Cross Country	Edinburgh	United Kingdom
19 January 2014	XXXII Cross Internacional de Italica	Seville	Spain
26 January 2014	82nd Cinque Mulini	San Vittore Olona	Italy
2 February 2014	37th Almond Blossom Cross Country	Albufeira	Portugal
9 February 2014	49th Chiba International Cross Country Meet	Chiba	Japan
9 February 2014	ING Eurocross	Diekirch	Luxembourg
15 February 2014	IAAF Permit/Athletics Kenya Cross Country	Nairobi	Kenya
16 November 2014	XI Cross de Atapuerca	Burgos	Spain
6 January 2015	58th Campaccio	San Giorgio su Legnano	Italy
18 January 2015	XXXII Cross Internacional de Italica	Seville	Spain
25 January 2015	72nd Cross Juan Muguerza	Elgoibar	Spain
8 February 2015	Chiba International Cross Country Meet	Chiba	Japan
14 February 2015	IAAF Permit/Athletics Kenya Cross Country	Nairobi	Kenya
15 February 2015	83rd Cinque Mulini	San Vittore Olona	Italy
22 February 2015	37th Almond Blossom Cross Country	Albufeira	Portugal
14 March 2015	IAAF Antrim International Cross Country	Antrim	United Kingdom
15 November 2015	Cross de Atapuerca	Burgos	Spain
6 January 2016	Campaccio	San Giorgio su Legnano	Italy
16 January 2016	IAAF Antrim International Cross Country	Antrim	United Kingdom
17 January 2016	Cross Internacional de Italica	Seville	Spain
24 January 2016	Cross Internacional Juan Muguerza	Elgoibar	Spain
31 January 2016	Cinque Mulini	San Vittore Olona	Italy
13 February 2016	IAAF Permit/Athletics Kenya Cross Country	Nairobi	Kenya
13 March 2016	Almond Blossom Cross Country	Albufeira	Portugal
13 November 2016	Cross de Atapuerca	Burgos	Spain
27 November 2016	Cross Internacional de la Constitucion de Alcobendas	Alcobendas	Spain
6 January 2017	60° Campaccio	San Giorgio su Legnano	Italy
14 January 2017	IAAF Antrim International Cross Country	Antrim	United Kingdom
15 January 2017	Cross Internacional de Italica	Seville	Spain
22 January 2017	Cinque Mulini	San Vittore Olona	Italy
5 February 2017	Almond Blossom Cross Country	Albufeira	Portugal
12 November 2017	Cross de Atapuerca	Burgos	Spain
6 January 2018	61° Campaccio	San Giorgio su Legnano	Italy
6 January 2018	IAAF Antrim International Cross Country	Antrim	United Kingdom
14 January 2018	Cross Internacional Juan Muguerza	Elgoibar	Spain
21 January 2018	Cross Internacional de Italica	Seville	Spain
11 February 2018	Cinque Mulini	San Vittore Olona	Italy
18 February 2018	Almond Blossom Cross Country	Albufeira	Portugal
11 November 2018	Cross de Atapuerca	Burgos	Spain
18 November 2018	Cross Internacional de Soria	Soria	Spain
25 November 2018	Cross Internacional de la Constitucion	Alcobendas	Spain
6 January 2019	62° Campaccio	San Giorgio su Legnano	Italy
13 January 2019	Cross Internacional Juan Muguerza	Elgoibar	Spain
19 January 2019	Northern Ireland International Cross Country	Belfast	United Kingdom
20 January 2019	Cross Internacional de Italica	Seville	Spain
27 January 2019	87th Cinque Mulini	San Vittore Olona	Italy
3 February 2019	Almond Blossom Cross Country	Albufeira	Portugal
