= IAAF World Cross Challenge =

International cross-country competition

- Sport: Cross country running
- Founded: 1990
- Ceased: 2000
- Continent: Global

The IAAF World Cross Challenge was an annual global series of cross country running competitions organized by the International Association of Athletics Federations (IAAF). Athletes accumulated points in the series' cross country meets during the season, which typically began in December and finished in March prior to the annual IAAF World Cross Country Championships. The series was based upon the IAAF Grand Prix track and field circuit and the IAAF hoped to similarly boost the sport of cross country running. The last series was held in 1999–2000, after which point it was replaced by the IAAF Cross Country Permit Meetings series which featured similar races but did not have a point scoring format.

== Editions ==
IAAF World Cross Challenge editions
Ed.	Year	Start date	End date	Meets	Ref.
1	1990–91				
2	1991–92				
3	1992–93				
4	1993–94				
5	1994–95				
6	1995–96				
7	1996–97	22 December 1996	23 March 1997	12	
8	1997–98	21 December 1997	21 March 1998	12	
9	1998–99	20 December 1998	28 March 1999	7	
10	1999–2000	19 December 1999	19 March 2000	7	

== Meetings ==
IAAF World Cross Challenge meetings
#	Meeting	City	Country	1990–91	1991–92	1992–93	1993–94	1994–95	1995–96	1996–97	1997–98	1998–99	1999–2000
1	Lotto Cross Cup Brussels	Brussels	Belgium							X	X	X	X
2	Great North Cross Country	Durham	United Kingdom							X	X	X	X
3	Cross Internacional de Itálica	Seville	Spain							X	X	X	X
4	Almond Blossom Cross Country	Vilamoura	Portugal							X	X	X	X
5	Nairobi International Cross Country	Nairobi	Kenya							X		X	X
6	Chiba International Cross Country	Chiba	Japan							X	X	X	X
7	IAAF World Cross Country Championships	Various	Various							X	X	X	X
8	Belfast International Cross Country	Belfast	Northern Ireland							X	X		
9	Cross Zornotza	Amorebieta-Etxano	Spain							X	X		
10	Cross Auchan	Tourcoing	France							X	X		
11	Eurocross	Diekirch	Luxembourg							X	X		
12	Cinque Mulini	San Vittore Olona	Italy							X	X		
13	Mombasa International Cross Country	Mombasa	Kenya								X		

== Results ==
=== Men ===
Season	Gold		Silver		Bronze	
1990-91	Ondoro Osoro; Kenya	115	Addis Abebe; Ethiopia	113	Richard Chelimo; Kenya	107
1991-92	Fita Bayissa; Ethiopia	138	Ondoro Osoro; Kenya	97	Dominic Kirui; Kenya	88
1992-93	Ismael Kirui; Kenya	116	Fita Bayissa; Ethiopia	110	Dominic Kirui; Kenya	103
1993-94	Haile Gebrselassie; Ethiopia	107	William Sigei; Kenya	97	Ismael Kirui; Kenya	91
1994-95	Ismael Kirui; Kenya	135	Paulo Guerra; Portugal	130	Salah Hissou; Morocco	117
1995-96	Paul Tergat; Kenya	125	James Kariuki; Kenya	97	Joseph Kimani; Kenya	64
1996-97	Paul Tergat; Kenya	113	Bernard Barmasai; Kenya	102	Jon Brown; Great Britain	83
1997-98	Paul Tergat; Kenya	139	Tom Nyariki; Kenya	119	Paul Koech; Kenya	113
1998-99	Paul Koech; Kenya	118	Paul Tergat; Kenya	97	Mohammed Mourhit; Belgium	85
1999-00	Paul Tergat; Kenya	107	Patrick Ivuti; Kenya	104	Assefa Mezgebu; Ethiopia	102

=== Women ===
Season	Gold		Silver		Bronze	
1990-91	Susan Sirma; Kenya	125	Jane Ngotho; Kenya	123	Derartu Tulu; Ethiopia	88
1991-92	Catherina McKiernan; Ireland	141	Albertina Dias; Portugal	123	Luchia Yishak; Ethiopia	122
1992-93	Catherina McKiernan; Ireland	141	Albertina Dias; Portugal	138	Esther Kiplagat; Kenya	98
1993-94	Catherina McKiernan; Ireland	141	Albertina Dias; Portugal	123	Margareta Keszeg; Romania	97
1994-95	Catherina McKiernan; Ireland	135	Rose Cheruiyot; Kenya	126	Catherine Kirui; Kenya	100
1995-96	Rose Cheruiyot; Kenya	138	Gabriela Szabo; Romania	109	Gete Wami; Ethiopia	104
1996-97	Gete Wami; Ethiopia	132	Elena Fidatov; Romania	118	Paula Radcliffe; Great Britain	99
1997-98	Merima Denboba; Ethiopia	120	Paula Radcliffe; Great Britain	104	Jackline Maranga; Kenya	98
1998-99	Gete Wami; Ethiopia	144	Merima Denboba; Ethiopia	79	Paula Radcliffe; Great Britain	72
1999-00	Lydia Cheromei; Kenya	122	Gete Wami; Ethiopia	119	Ayelech Worku; Ethiopia	94

== See also ==
- IAAF Combined Events Challenge
- IAAF Hammer Throw Challenge
- IAAF Race Walking Challenge
