= Kidane Tadesse =

Eritrean long-distance runner (born 1987)

Kidane Tadesse Habtesilase^{[nb]} (Tigrinya: ኪዳነ ታዳስሰ; born 31 August 1987) is an Eritrean long-distance runner who specializes in the 5000 metres and 10,000 metres.

He was born in Adi Bana. As a junior, he competed in the junior races at the IAAF World Cross Country Championships, finishing sixteenth in 2005 and eleventh in 2006. He finished sixth in the 5000 metres at the 2006 World Junior Championships.

At the 2008 Olympic Games he finished tenth in the 5000 metres and twelfth in the 10,000 metres. At the 2009 World Championships he finished ninth in the 10,000 metres and failed to reach the final of the 5000 metres. His best finish at the World Cross Country Championships in a senior race was 26th in 2008.

He was part of the Eritrean silver medal winning team at the 2010 IAAF World Cross Country Championships. The following November he took third behind the competition's gold and silver medallists (Joseph Ebuya and Teklemariam Medhin) at the Cross de Atapuerca, and was then second to Medhin at the Oeiras Cross. He was third behind the duo again at the Cross de la Constitución in December. After missing the entirety of the 2011 track season, he returned to competition on grass and was a close second at the Cross de Atapuerca in November, losing in a sprint finish against the world champion Imane Merga. At the Cross Valle de Llodio he was again runner-up, beaten by Leonard Komon, but he edged Ebuya to win the Cross de la Constitución.

His personal best times are 13:11.85 minutes in the 5000 meters, achieved in 2010 in Huelva; and 27:06.16 minutes in the 10,000 metres, achieved in May 2008 in Neerpelt.

He is the younger brother of Zersenay Tadese, who is an Olympic and World Championship medallist.

== Notes ==
- ^{nb} Although Kidane's brother, Zersenay Tadese, clarified that Tadasse and Tadesse were incorrect and that Tadese is the proper form of his Habesha name, Kidane is most commonly known as Kidane Tadesse or Tadasse.
