= Ondoro Osoro =

Kenyan long-distance runner (born 1967)

Medal record

Men's athletics

Representing Kenya

All-Africa Games
Bronze medal – third place	1991 Cairo	5000 m

Ondoro Osoro (born 3 December 1967) is a former Kenyan long-distance runner who competed mostly in cross country and road races.

In his early career he won a series of cross country races in Europe (taking the first IAAF World Cross Challenge title) and twice represented Kenya at the IAAF World Cross Country Championships. He also ran the 5000 metres on the track, competing at the World Championships in Athletics and winning a bronze medal at the 1991 All-Africa Games. He won the San Silvestre Vallecana 10 km road race three times during this period.

A serious car accident in 1995 left him unable to compete for two years, but he returned to action with a world record for the 10-mile (16 km) run in late 1997. On his debut over the 42,195 kilometres (26,219 mi) distance, he won the 1998 Chicago Marathon with a time of 2:06:54 hours, which ranked him as the third fastest ever at that point and was the fastest ever debut run for the marathon. He was third in Chicago in 1999 and came fourth at the 2000 Boston Marathon. He was picked for the Kenyan Olympic team at the 2000 Sydney Games, but was shot in the neck during a carjacking in Kenya a month before the competition.

He began running again in 2001, but the kidnapping of his son and a bout of malaria reduced his competitive appearances. Although nerve damage from the shooting meant he ran with a constant lean to the right, he placed third at the 2002 Honolulu Marathon and won the San Diego Marathon in 2003. He went on to have two more top ten finishes in the San Diego race and placed ninth in the 2004 Frankfurt Marathon.

== Career ==
=== Early running and cross country success ===
His first major race wins came in 1990, when he won the Cross Internacional de Itálica and the San Silvestre Vallecana 10 km race in Madrid. Osoro won both competitions again the following year, and also the Cross Internacional Valle de Llodio. He was the inaugural winner of the IAAF World Cross Challenge series that year and was runner-up to Fita Bayisa in the following season's competition.

Osoro represented Kenya twice on the world stage in 1991, running at the 1991 IAAF World Cross Country Championships (where he came fifth in the long race) and then on the track at the 1991 World Championships in Athletics (being eliminated in the 5000 metres heats by a narrow margin against Dionísio Castro). However, he won a medal in the 5000 m at that year's 1991 All-Africa Games. He featured in the Kenyan World Cross Country team for a second time at the 1992 IAAF World Cross Country Championships, although he was less successful on this attempt as he finished in 23rd place. Among his outings on the circuit, he won at the Belfast International Cross Country meet.

At the start of the 1993 season, he won the Almond Blossom Cross Country. He ran on the European track circuit and greatly improved his 5000 m best, running a time of 13:25.79 minutes at the Bislett Games in Oslo. He also ran bests over 3000 metres (7:43.20 min) and for 10,000 metres (27:24.24 min). As one of the fastest runners that year, he was given entry into the 5000 m at the 1993 IAAF Grand Prix Final and came sixth. He ended the year with a win at the Cross Internacional de la Constitución and a third title at the San Silvestre Vallecana. His 1994 was highlighted by a consecutive win at the Almond Blossom meet and a career best over the 5000 m of 13:16.39 minutes in London.

=== Injuries and marathon running ===
An accident in southern Kenya at the start of 1995 brought his career to an abrupt halt. A truck collided with his car and he suffered injuries to his head, chest and arm. This ruled him out for the rest of the year and, due to a further injury to his Achilles tendon, he did not return to competitive running until 1997. He began working with German running coach Dieter Hogen around this period. His comeback demonstrated that the accident had not diminished his running ability: in September 1997 he won the City of Pittsburgh Great Race 10 km race in a time of 27:14 minutes on the downhill course – a time that was only slower than the official world record holder Joseph Kimani and the record times run by Stephenson Nyamu and Joseph Kamau on the same course in 1995. The following month he won a 10-mile (16 km) race in St. Petersburg, Florida in a world road record time of 45:37 minutes. Although three other men had previously run faster, all had done so on the assisted Dam tot Damloop course in Zaandam, thus making Osoro the official record holder for the distance. This remained a world record for four years, lasting until December 2001 when Simon Maina became the new record holder, and was the fastest 10-mile (16 km) ever run in the United States until 2006, when Haile Gebrselassie improved the mark en route to a half marathon record.

In May 1998 he won the 20 km of Brussels and the next month he travelled to the United States, winning the Orange Classic 10K and running a career best of 43:00 minutes for 15K for second place at the Utica Boilermaker. He decided to make his debut over the marathon distance that year, choosing to run at the 1998 Chicago Marathon despite his inexperience and the lack of appearance money from the race organisers. He won the race on his first attempt, setting the fastest ever time for a débutante with his winning time of 2:06:54 hours – this made him the third fastest of all time, one minute slower than then-world record holder Ronaldo da Costa. Osoro returned to the Chicago race the following year but was not successful in defending his title. Khalid Khannouchi won in a world record time, but Osoro managed third place in his second outing over the 42.195 km distance with his time of 2:08:00 hours.

He began his 2000 season with a personal best run in the half marathon of 1:01:50 hours, with which he won the Kyoto Half Marathon. He came fourth at the 2000 Boston Marathon, recording a time of 2:10:29 hours on the Massachusetts course. He was later chosen for the Kenyan marathon team for the 2000 Sydney Olympics, gaining the chance to represent his country at the Olympic level for the first time. However, while driving his family in Kenya that July, he was a victim of a violent carjacking. His pregnant wife was pushed from the car, then Osoro was shot by a gunman in the neck and flung from the vehicle. The carjackers later released Osoro's daughter and sister-in-law unharmed and abandoned the car. Osoro was hospitalised for eight weeks and visited neurologists in London – nerve damage had left him temporarily unable to move his arm and leg on the right side of his body. He missed his chance at run at the Olympics and was only able to begin running again in April 2001.

=== Later marathoning ===
He had endured a further incident during his recovery period: Osoro's wealth as a marathon runner attracted kidnappers; his son was abducted and held for ransom in Kenya, but managed to escape his two kidnappers unharmed. Osoro made his major race comeback at the 2001 Chicago Marathon in October and managed seventh place overall. However, his career was put on hold again in 2002, this time for contracting malaria, and because of his mother's long-term illness. He ran at the Honolulu Marathon in December, coming in third in a Kenyan sweep of the top three alongside Mbarak Hussein and Jimmy Muindi. In June the following year he ran at the Rock 'n' Roll San Diego Marathon and, in spite of the fact that he ran with a lean to the right throughout (an effect of nerve damage), he won the race and recorded his third marathon time under two hours and ten minutes (2:09:38 hours).

Osoro returned to San Diego in 2004, but finished fourth on that occasion. He was among the favourites for the Frankfurt Marathon in October of that year, although a heavy fall mid-race saw him fade to ninth place with a time of 2:15:11, crossing the line with a bloodied hip. The next year, he ran in San Diego for a third time and came seventh. His running career subsequently declined; he entered the 2008 Boston Marathon but did not manage to finish the race.

His brother, Penuel Osoro, is also a marathon runner.
