= Leonard Komon =

Kenyan long-distance runner (born 1988)

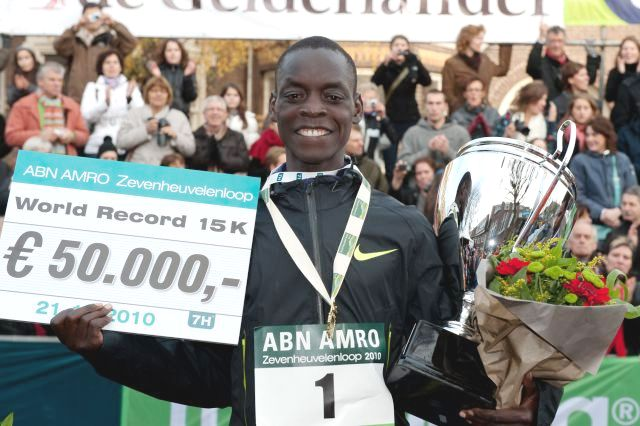
Zevenheuvelenloop 2010

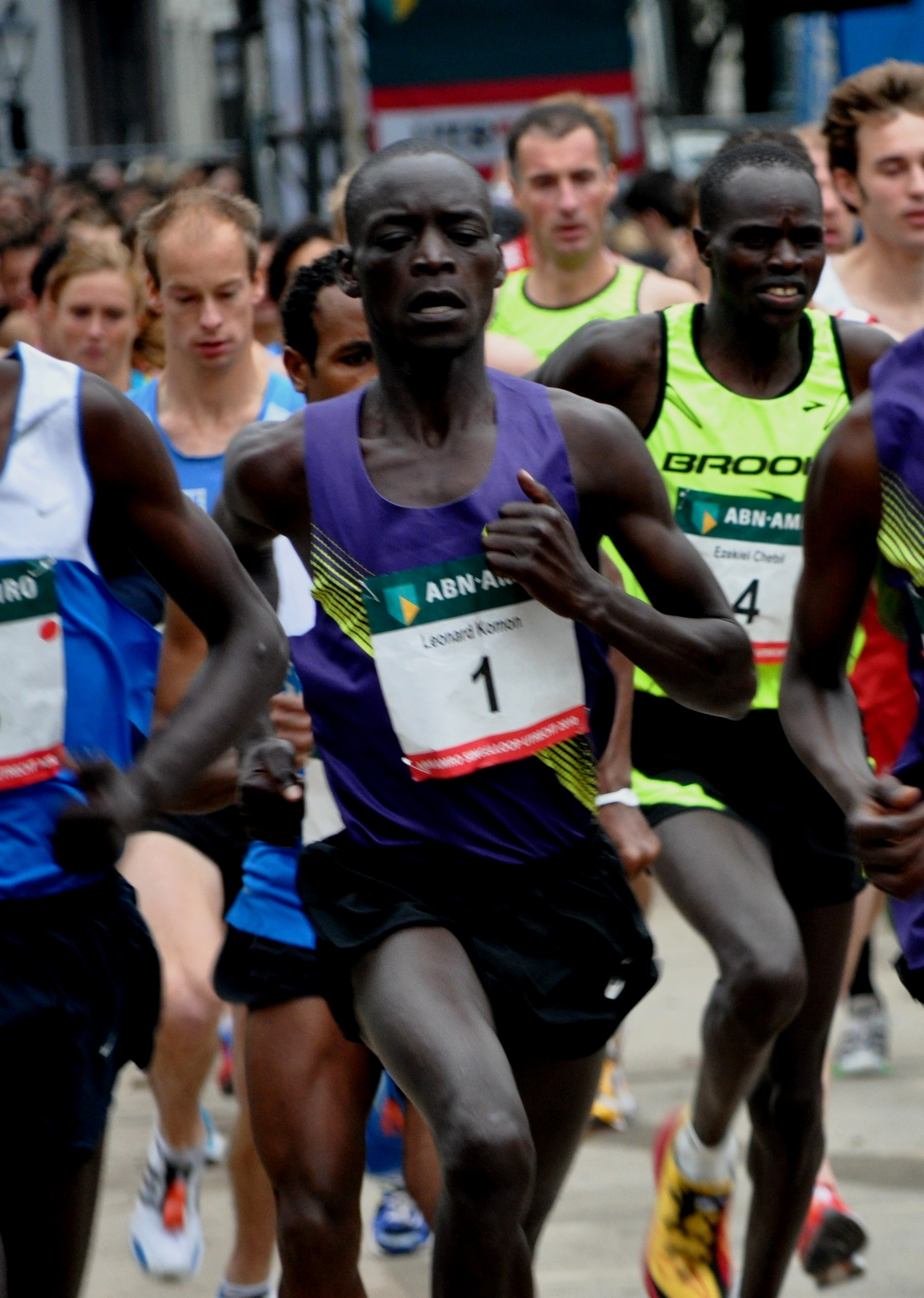
Komon en route to his world record at the 2010 Singelloop Utrecht

Leonard Patrick Komon (born 10 January 1988) is a Kenyan professional long-distance runner and was the world record holder in the 10 kilometres. His 10K world record in 2010 with a time of 26:44 is a 17 seconds improvement on the previous best. He won a half marathon with 59:14 in 2014 (Berlin), which was the fastest debut half marathon in history at the time.

Komon was the silver medallist at the 2008 IAAF World Cross Country Championships and shared in three team golds from 2008 to 2010.

== Career ==
Komon was born in Cheptais in Mount Elgon District. Komon won his first medals in cross country running competitions, taking the junior silver medal at the 2006 IAAF World Cross Country Championships and progressing to win the senior silver at the 2008 edition. He was the 2008 winner of the Cross Internacional de Soria. Komon was close to winning the bronze medal at the 2009 World Cross Country Championships in Amman, but he missed out by one second behind Zersenay Tadese and Moses Kipsiro.

He completed a strong 2009–2010 cross country season in Spain, finishing third in the Cross de la Constitucion (Alcobendas) and first in both the Cross de Itálica (Sevilla) and the Cross de Elgoibar (Basque Country). This marked him out a contender for a medal at the 2010 World Cross Country Championships in Poland. Having been among the leading four runners in the final lap at the championships, he looked set to claim third place but a late sprint in the final 100 m saw Moses Ndiema Kipsiro overhaul the Kenyan. They both recorded a time of 33:10 and Komon ended up in fourth, although his finish did help the Kenyan men (led by Joseph Ebuya) to the team gold medal – an exact repeat of his performance from the previous year. He set a personal best over 5000 metres on the track at the 2009 Golden Gala in Rome, running 12:58.24 for third place behind Kenenisa Bekele and Mark Kiptoo.

In September 2010, at the Singelloop in Utrecht, the Netherlands, Komon ran a world record for the 10-kilometre road race with a time of 26:44 minutes. This was a seventeen-second improvement upon Micah Kogo's previous best as Komon became the first man under 27 minutes over the road distance. He continued his strong form at the Grand 10 Berlin race, where he took on former record holder Kogo and comprehensively beat him, finishing in 27:12 – over a minute ahead his rival. On 21 November 2010 Komon set his second world record of the year. Winning the Zevenheuvelenloop 15K in 41:13 minutes, he bettered the former mark held by Felix Limo and Deriba Merga by sixteen seconds.

Komon began preparing for the cross country championships in January and came second at the Campaccio race behind reigning champion Ebuya, then retained his title at the Cross de Itálica. A sixth-place finish at the Kenyan Cross Country Championships brought him a spot for the World team. The governing body, Athletics Kenya, removed him from the team however, as he defied their orders not to compete at the World's Best 10K in February, at which he came fourth. He produced a course record time to win at the UAE Healthy Kidney 10K in Central Park that April. In October, he set his sights on running a 10-mile world record at the Great South Run, but a slow second half undid his initial quick pace, although he did beat Abel Kirui to win the race. He also won the Grand 10 Berlin race for a second time running that month. Turning to the grass circuits of Spain, he took a comfortable win over Kidane Tadesse at the Cross Internacional Valle de Llodio. His 2011 ended with a win at the Silvesterlauf Peuerbach.

He was injured for much of 2012 but returned to action in September with a run of 27:01.58 minutes for fifth in the Memorial Van Damme 10,000 m. He won the Dam tot Damloop for a second year running, but was slower than his previous outing, leading him to question his performance. He took a third straight victory at the Grand 10 Berlin, was second to Nicholas Kipkemboi at the Zevenheuvelenloop, then won the Peuerbach race again on New Year's Eve.

Komon won the UAE Healthy Kidney 10K in May but had a quiet season after failing to qualify for the 10,000 m at the 2013 World Championships in Athletics. He was fifth at the Dam tot Damloop 10-miler, but managed to retain his title at the Grand 10 Berlin. Komon won the Crescent City Classic in 2014 and won third place at the 17th Prague Half Marathon in 2015.

== Achievements ==
Year	Competition	Venue	Position	Notes
2006	World Cross Country Championships	Fukuoka, Japan	2nd	Junior race
2007	World Cross Country Championships	Mombasa, Kenya	4th	Junior race
2008	World Cross Country Championships	Edinburgh, Scotland	2nd	Senior race
2008	World Cross Country Championships	Edinburgh, Scotland	1st	Team competition
2009	World Cross Country Championships	Amman, Jordan	4th	Long race
2009	World Cross Country Championships	Amman, Jordan	1st	Team
2010	World Cross Country Championships	Bydgoszcz, Poland	4th	Senior race
2010	World Cross Country Championships	Bydgoszcz, Poland	1st	Team

=== Personal bests ===
- 3000 metres – 7:33.27 min (2009)
- Two miles – 8:22.57 min (2007)
- 5000 metres – 12:58.24 min (2006)
- 10,000 metres – 26:55.29 min (2011)
- 10K – 26:44 min (2010)
- 15K – 41:13 min (2010)

Half Marathon 59:14 (2014) (fastest debut half marathon in history)

Records
Preceded by (Kenya) Micah Kogo	Men's 10 kilometres world record holder 26 September 2010	Succeeded by Incumbent
