= Cross Internacional de Itálica =

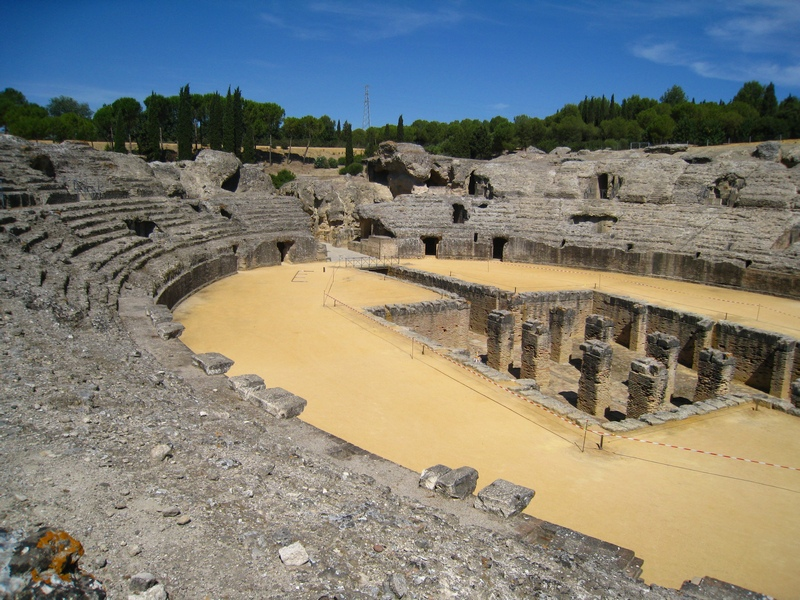
- The race course passes alongside Itálica's ancient amphitheatre
- Date: Mid-January
- Location: Santiponce, Spain
- Event type: Cross country
- Distance: 9.3 km for men & women
- Established: 19 December 1982
- Website: Cross Internacional de Itálica

The Cross Internacional de Itálica is an annual cross country running competition that is held every January in Santiponce, near Seville, Spain. Inaugurated on December 19, 1982, the race course is set in the ruins of the ancient Roman city of Itálica. As one of only two Spanish competitions to hold IAAF permit meeting status, it is one of the more prestigious races on the Spanish cross country circuit.

The competition comprises three general categories of race: children's and junior races, the mass participation ("popular") race, and the professional international races. The men's international race was a 10 km race until 1999 when it was increased to roughly 11 km. The distance of the women's international race (currently 8 km) has also fluctuated, varying between 5.5 km and 6.6 km in its early years. The course of the race loops through the ancient streets of Itálica, passing alongside ruins throughout. The red clay ground usually makes for a dry running surface, although rain has occasionally made this a particularly difficult, muddy course in previous editions.

The international fields for the Cross de Itálica frequently feature some of the most successful cross country athletes. Past winners include Paul Tergat, Kenenisa Bekele, Gelete Burka, Paula Radcliffe and Florence Kiplagat. Indeed, in six separate years (1994, 1998, 1999, 2003, 2004 and 2009) one of the winners of the Cross de Itálica has gone on to win at the IAAF World Cross Country Championships.

== Past senior race winners ==
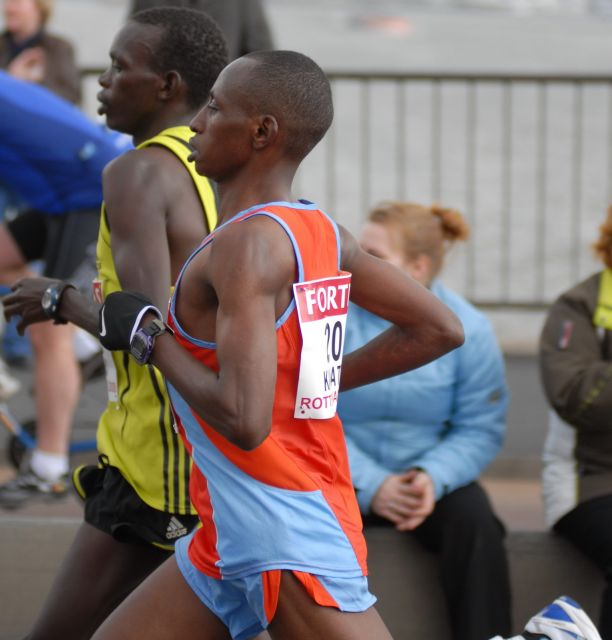
Charles Kamathi scored consecutive wins through 2000 and 2001.

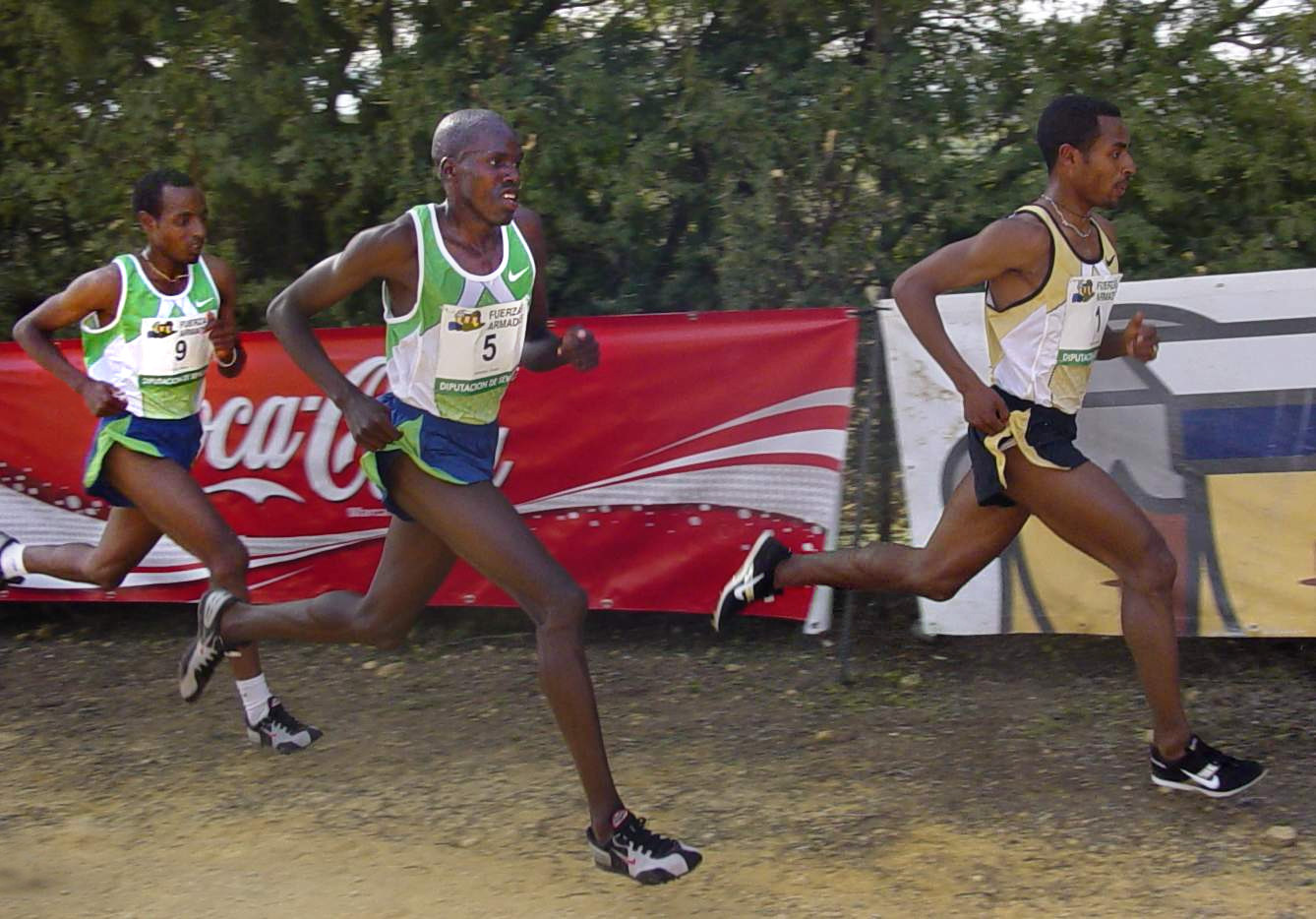
Kenenisa Bekele on his way to a third Cross de Itálica victory in 2007 – a course record.

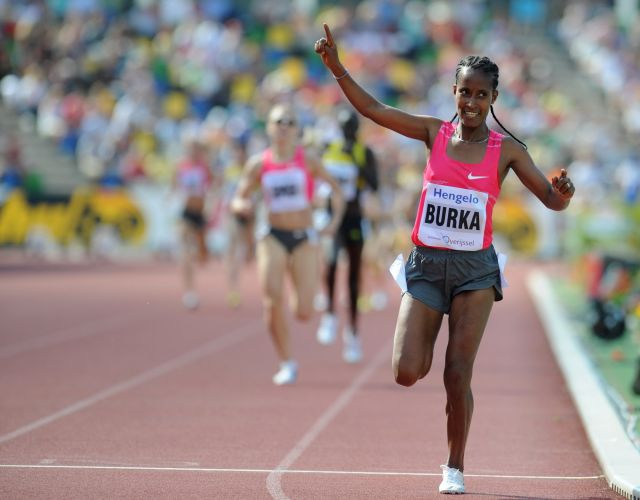
The 2007 women's race was won by Ethiopian Gelete Burka

Edition	Year	Men's winner	Time (m:s)	Women's winner	Time (m:s)
I	1982	José Alonso (ESP)	?	Not Held	—
II	1983	Juan Barón (ESP)	?	Not Held	—
III	1984	Fernando Mamede (POR)	?	Not Held	—
IV	1985	Fernando Mamede (POR)	?	Not Held	—
—	1986	Not Held	—	Not Held	—
V	1987	Paul Kipkoech (KEN)	?	Not Held	—
VI	1988	Paul Kipkoech (KEN)	28:48	Not Held	—
VII	1989	Domingos Castro (POR)	28:28	Not Held	—
VIII	1990	Ondoro Osoro (KEN)	28:21	Not Held	—
IX	1991	Ondoro Osoro (KEN)	28:33	Andrea Wallace (ENG)	17:39
X	1992	Khalid Skah (MAR)	28:05	Hellen Kimaiyo (KEN)	17:17
XI	1993	Fita Bayisa (ETH)	27:53	Catherina McKiernan (IRL)	17:11
XII	1994	William Sigei (KEN)	28:04	Yelena Romanova (RUS)	17:54
XIII	1995	Paulo Guerra (POR)	28:49	Catherina McKiernan (IRL)	17:43
XIV	1996	Haile Gebrselassie (ETH)	28:59	Annemari Sandell (FIN)	17:57
XV	1997	Paulo Guerra (POR)	29:57	Elena Fidatov (ROM)	20:26
XVI	1998	Paul Tergat (KEN)	27:57	Jackline Maranga (KEN)	19:15
XVII	1999	Paul Tergat (KEN)	30:56	Zahra Ouaziz (MAR)	21:34
XVIII	2000	Charles Kamathi (KEN)	20:30	Gete Wami (ETH)	21:15
XIX	2001	Charles Kamathi (KEN)	31:48	Paula Radcliffe (ENG)	21:31.7
XX	2002	Abraham Chebii (KEN)	30:38	Mónica Rosa (POR)	21:22
XXI	2003	Kenenisa Bekele (ETH)	31:32	Merima Denboba (ETH)	21:42
XXII	2004	Kenenisa Bekele (ETH)	31:01.6	Merima Denboba (ETH)	21:43
XXIII	2005	Terefe Maregu (ETH)	31:22	Werknesh Kidane (ETH)	28:43
XXIV	2006	Abebe Dinkesa (ETH)	31:03	Bezunesh Bekele (ETH)	21:32
XXV	2007	Kenenisa Bekele (ETH)	31:05	Gelete Burka (ETH)	21:14
XXVI	2008	Moses Kipsiro (UGA)	31:01	Priscah Cherono (KEN)	25:49
XXVII	2009	Moses Kipsiro (UGA)	30:37	Florence Kiplagat (KEN)	26:14
XXVIII	2010	Leonard Komon (KEN)	31:14	Linet Masai (KEN)	25:35
XXIX	2011	Leonard Komon (KEN)	30:38	Vivian Cheruiyot (KEN)	26:02
XXX	2012	Geoffrey Kipsang (KEN)	30:53	Linet Masai (KEN)	25:42
XXXI	2013	Jairus Birech (KEN)	31:56	Mercy Cherono (KEN)	26:48
XXXII	2014	Paul Tanui (KEN)	31:32	Hiwot Ayalew (ETH)	27:18
XXXIII	2015	Teklemariam Medhin (ERI)	32:28	Emily Chebet (KEN)	27:15
XXXIV	2016	Tamirat Tola (ETH)	30:57	Faith Kipyegon (KEN)	24:56
XXXV	2017	Aweke Ayalew (BHR)	31:36	Senbere Teferi (ETH)	25:52
XXXVI	2018	Joshua Cheptegei (UGA)	30:54	Agnes Jebet (KEN)	25:51
XXXVII	2019	Jacob Kiplimo (UGA)	27:48	Beatrice Chepkoech (KEN)	28:01
XXXVIII	2020	Tadese Worku (ETH)	27:32	Margaret Chelimo (KEN)	28:37
XXXIX	2021	Rodrigue Kwizera (BDI)	28:33	Norah Jeruto (KEN)	24:22
XL	2022	Thierry Ndikumwenayo (BDI)	28:51	Yasemin Can (TUR)	32:31
XLI	2023	Ronald Kwemoi (KEN)	29:09	Edinah Jebitok (KEN)	32:39
XLII	2024	Thierry Ndikumwenayo (ESP)	21:24	Beatrice Chebet (KEN)	23:32
XLIII	2025	Rodrigue Kwizera (BDI)	26:10	Winfred Yavi (BHR)	28:58
XLIV	2026	Rodrigue Kwizera (BDI)	27:36	Likina Amebaw (ETH)	30:41

=== Winners by country ===
Country	Men's race	Women's race	Total
Kenya	16	16	32
Ethiopia	9	9	18
Portugal	5	1	6
Uganda	4	0	4
Burundi	4	0	4
Spain	3	0	3
Bahrain	1	1	2
England	0	2	2
Ireland	0	2	2
Morocco	1	1	2
Eritrea	1	0	1
Finland	0	1	1
Romania	0	1	1
Russia	0	1	1
Turkey	0	1	1
