= Dorcus Inzikuru =

Ugandan track and field athlete

Medal record

Women's athletics

Representing Uganda

World Championships
Gold medal – first place	2005 Helsinki	3000 m st.

African Championships
Silver medal – second place	2002 Radès	5000 m

Commonwealth Games
Gold medal – first place	2006 Melbourne	3000 m st.

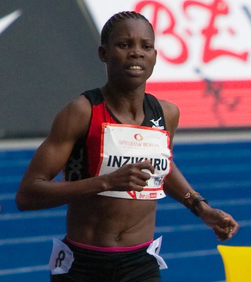

Dorcus Inzikuru (born 2 February 1982 in Vurra, Arua District) is a Ugandan track and field athlete, competing in the steeplechase. She won the inaugural world title in women's 3000 m steeplechase, as well as the first Commonwealth title in the event. Her coach is Renato Canova. Sometimes her name is spelt "Docus". It was misspelled in her passport, and the mistake was perpetuated when she entered international races.

== Career ==
Inzikuru won the bronze medal in the 5000 metres at the 2003 Afro-Asian Games, finishing behind Meseret Defar, and Tirunesh Dibaba. She also won at cross country, beating all-comers at the Eurocross meeting that year.

=== 2005 World Championships ===
In 2005, at the World Championships, in Helsinki, Finland, Inzikuru ended Uganda's 33-year wait for an athletics world title, winning the inaugural women's 3000 m steeplechase event, in a time of 9:18.24 (at the time, the sixth best performance ever). Inzikuru only became aware of the $60,000 prize after winning the final and vowed to use her money to build a house and to help young athletes.

She had competed in the 2005 IAAF World Cross Country Championships that year, but she finished in 18th place. In 2006, she won the Oeiras International Cross Country meeting, but she pulled out of that season's World Cross Country Championships.

=== 2009 return ===
After taking two years out from athletics, due to giving birth to her first child (Emmanuelle Munguci) and receiving treatment for sinus infections and various allergies, Inzikuru returned to competition. She won an 800 metres race in Namboole on 6 June 2009, with a time of 2:12.0, later saying: "This is my first race after over two years. I am just coming back and am proud of my time. It builds my confidence". She competed sparingly over the following years and could not recapture her steeplechase form, recording season's best of 9:53.02 and 9:54.50 minutes in 2010 and 2011.

Inzikuru returned to the top level of the sport in 2012, running a time of 9:30.95 minutes for the steeplechase and qualifying for the 2012 London Olympics. The event had moved on since her championship win, however, and she was not fast enough to reach the final. She ran at the major Weltklasse and Internationales Stadionfest meetings in Germany after the Olympic Games, but barely managed to reach the top ten. In 2013, she attempted to reinvigorate her career with a switch to the marathon, but on her debut at the Brighton Marathon she finished with a time of 2:42:38 hours, missing her target of the Ugandan record.

== Personal life ==
Inzikuru grew up in Vurra, in Arua District, the daughter of an Anglican priest. Her parents were both talented athletes, but did not compete internationally. She was the third of eight children, but lost her two older brothers at the ages of eight and fourteen, to typhoid and malaria.

Inzikuru was married to an accountant, Martin Bosco Acidri, a former sprinter, and together they had a daughter, Emmanuela Munguci. They separated in February 2012. He died in October 2013.

Inzikuru often lives and trains in Turin and competes for the Milan club Camelot. She often trains with men's world record holder, Saif Saaeed Shaheen, as the two share coach Renato Canova.

== Achievements ==
=== 3000 m Steeplechase ===
- 2005 World Championships, Gold (9:18.24)
- 2005 World Athletics Final, Gold
- 2006 Commonwealth Games, Gold (9:19.51)

=== 3000 m ===
- 1999 World Youth Championships, 8th

=== 5000 m ===
- 1999 African Games, 6th
- 2000 World Junior Championships, Gold
- 2002 Commonwealth Games, 4th
- 2002 African Games, Silver
- 2003 Afro-Asian Games, Bronze

=== Cross Country ===
- 2000 World Junior Championships, 10th
- 2004 World Championships (short course), 38th
- 2005 World Championships (short course), 18th
- 2007 World Championships, DNF

== Personal bests ==
- 800 m, 2:02.00
- One Mile, 4:36.05
- 3000 m, 8:46.29
- 5000 m, 15:05.30
- 2000 m Steeplechase, 6:04.46
- 3000 m Steeplechase, 9:15.04

Sporting positions
Preceded by (Russia) Gulnara Samitova-Galkina	Women's 3000 m Steeplechase; Best Year Performance; 2005	Succeeded by (Poland) Wioletta Janowska
