= Antrim International Cross Country =

Irish annual cross country event

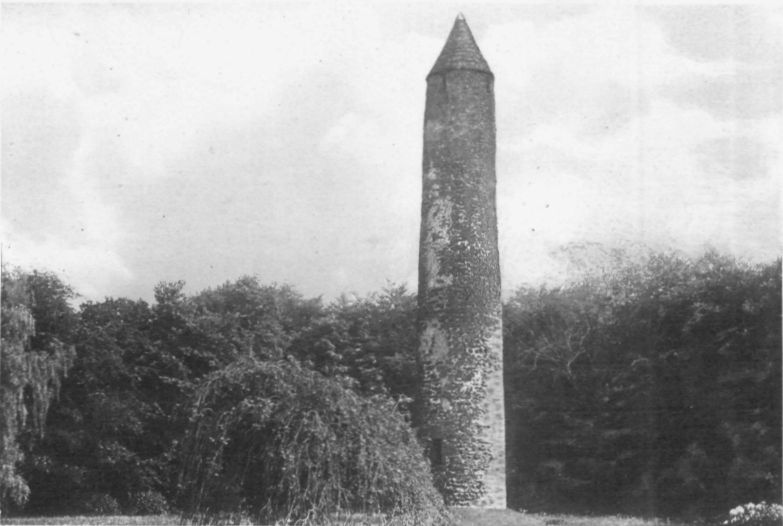
- The round tower in Antrim, where the meeting is held
- Date: January
- Location: Antrim, Northern Ireland
- Event type: Cross country
- Distance: 10 km for men 8 km for women
- Established: 1977

The Antrim International Cross Country, formerly the Belfast International Cross Country, is an annual cross country running meeting which takes place every January in Antrim, Northern Ireland. It is one of the IAAF's cross country permit meetings, as well as being part of the UK Cross Challenge tour. Previous winners include Paula Radcliffe, Paul Tergat and Steve Ovett.

== History ==
The meeting began in 1977 and was held in Mallusk, near Belfast, until 1996. At that point, the course moved for a two-year stint in Barnett Demesne before settling in Stormont in 1999. The course was again moved in 2009, when it became known as the Antrim International Cross Country.

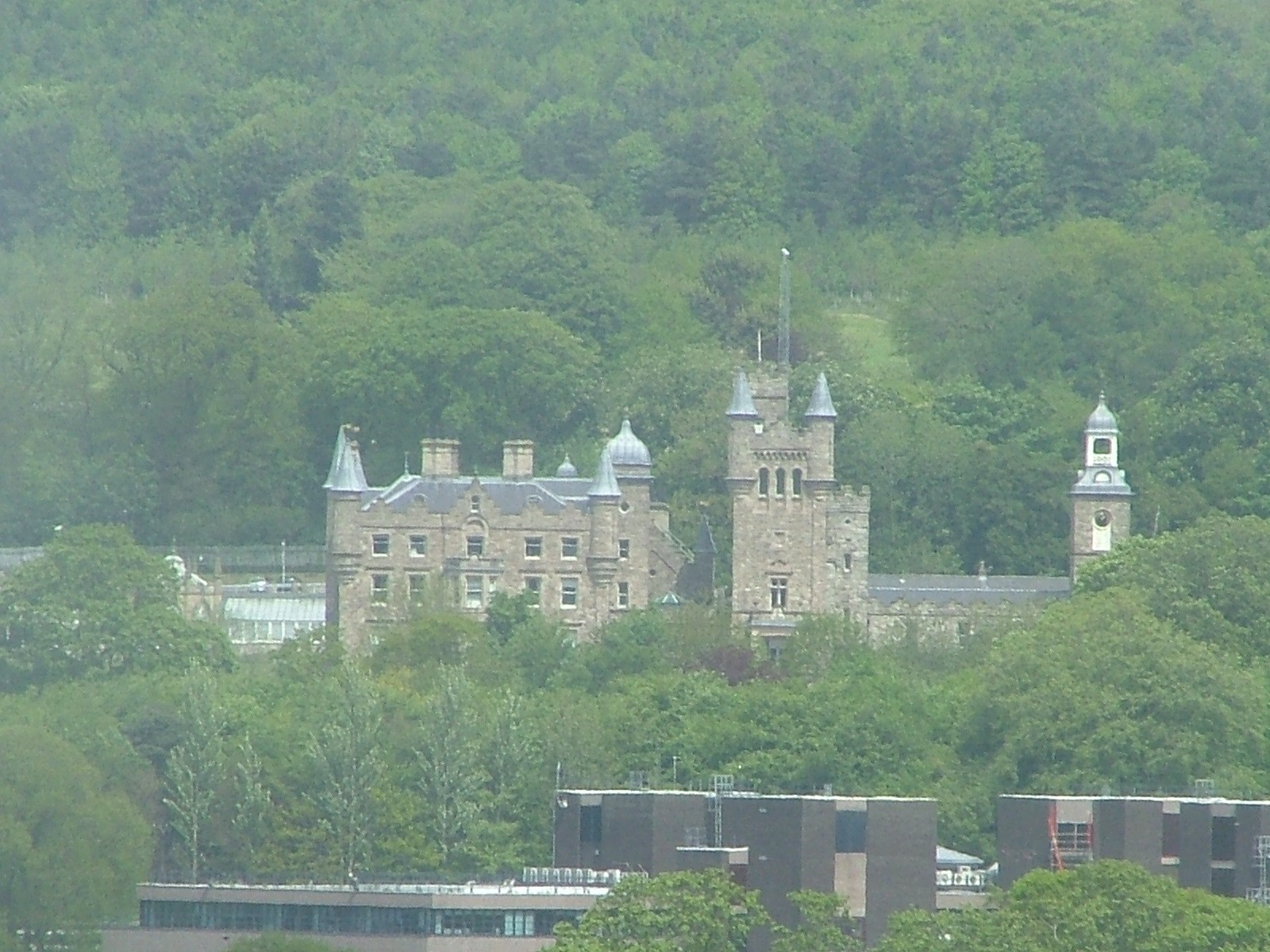
The meeting was held near Stormont Castle from 1999 to 2008.

In addition to having been held at numerous venues, the competition has been known under a large variety of names. It was called the Mallusk Crosscountry between 1977 and 1991, except a brief change to the Brooks International Crosscountry in 1989. The meeting was frequently renamed for sponsorship reasons, becoming the Milk International in 1986, the Reebok International Crosscountry in 1992 and 1993, the Ulster Milk Games International in 1994, the Coca-Cola International Crosscountry from 1995 to 1999 and finally the Fila International Crosscountry for 2000–01. During the meeting's time at Stormont it was known as the Belfast International Cross Country and it was in this period that the meeting was elevated to IAAF permit status.

The race course of the meetings at Stormont was on the grounds surrounding Stormont Castle. The current course for the race is on the grassy fields of the Greenmount Campus just outside Antrim town. The races are currently held over 9 km for men and 5.6 km for women. This distance has significantly fluctuated on an annual basis. The men's race was an 8 km from the inaugural edition until 2003. The women's race—introduced in 1986—was previously a 4.8 km race during that period.

Steve Ovett became the first athlete to win the meeting twice, winning in 1978 and 1984. The most successful athlete in the history of the competition is Paula Radcliffe, who has won a record four times (in 1994, 1996, 2000 and 2001). Around 1000 male and female athletes participate in the senior races each year.

== Past winners ==
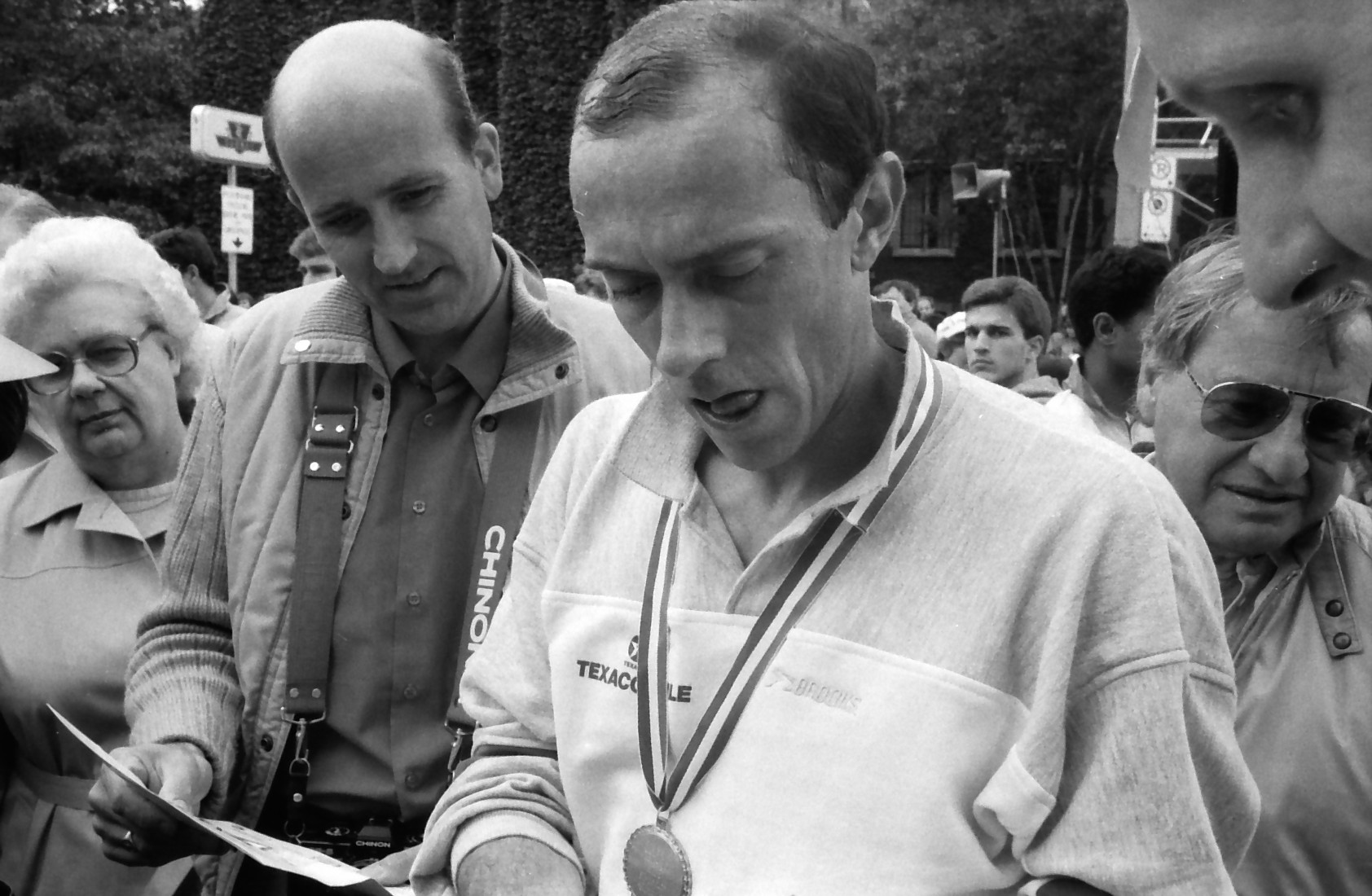
Steve Ovett took the honours in the second and seventh editions.

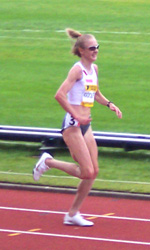
Paula Radcliffe is a four-time meet winner.

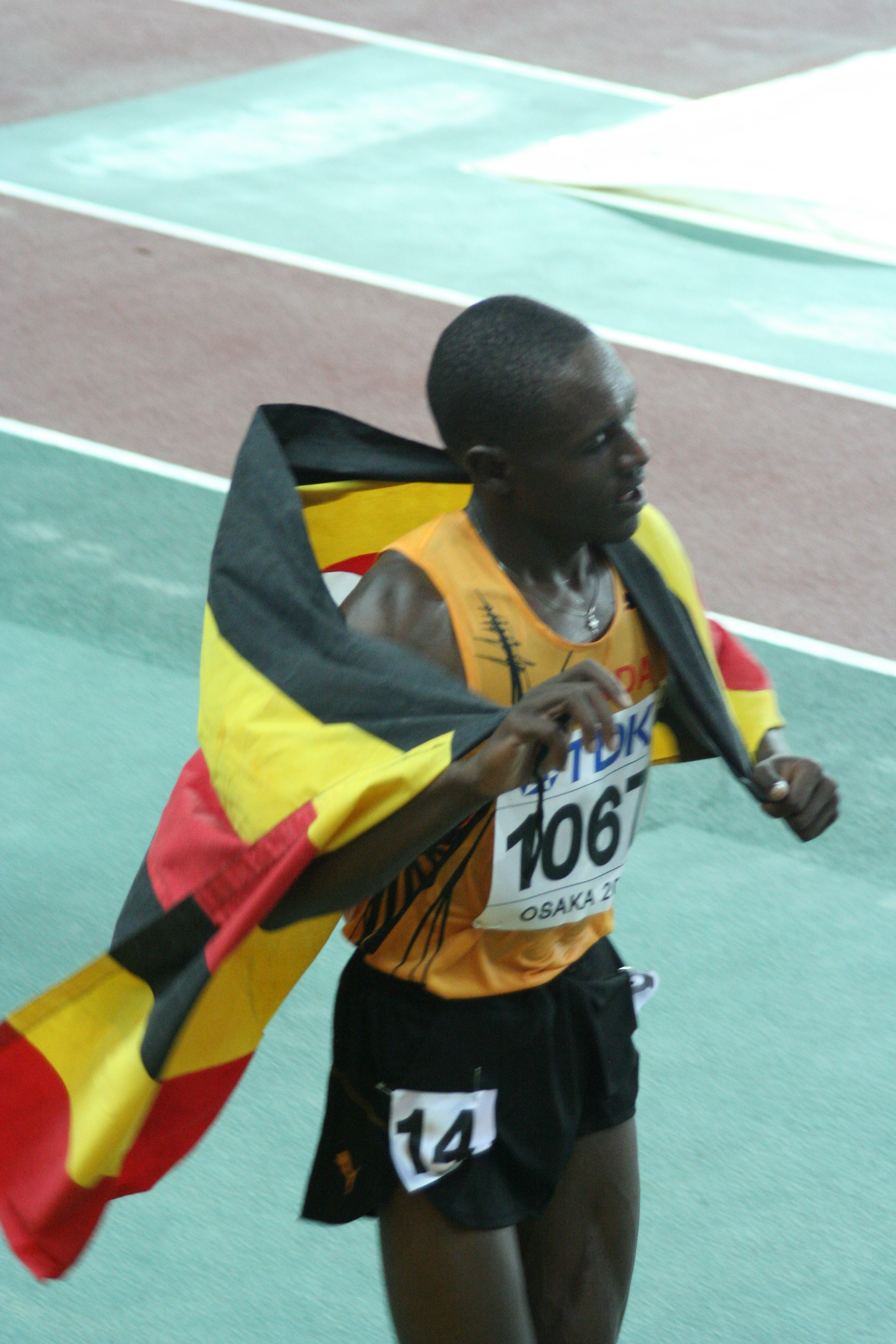
Uganda's Moses Kipsiro won consecutively in 2007 and 2008.

Edition	Year	Men's winner	Time (m:s)	Women's winner	Time (m:s)
1st	1977	Gerard Deegan (IRL)	28:00	Not held	—
2nd	1978	Steve Ovett (ENG)	24:08	Not held	—
—	1979	Not held	—	Not held	—
3rd	1980	Nathaniel Muir (SCO)	24:33	Not held	—
4th	1981	Barry Smith (ENG)	25:03	Not held	—
5th	1982	John Treacy (IRL)	28:00	Not held	—
6th	1983	David Taylor (IRL)	24:37	Not held	—
7th	1984	Steve Ovett (ENG)	24:36	Not held	—
8th	1985	Tim Hutchings (ENG)	22:06	Not held	—
9th	1986	Roger Hackney (WAL)	26:12	Susan Tooby (WAL)	18:18
10th	1987	Roger Hackney (WAL)	24:23	Liz McColgan (SCO)	16:26
11th	1988	Dave Lewis (ENG)	25:22	Liz McColgan (SCO)	17:31
12th	1989	Steve Tunstall (ENG)	25:02	Jill Boltz (ENG)	17:21
13th	1990	Craig Mochrie (ENG)	24:50	Róisín Smyth (IRL)	17:43
14th	1991	Eamonn Martin (ENG)	24:42	Susan Sirma (KEN)	16:46
15th	1992	Ondoro Osoro (KEN)	22:37	Catherina McKiernan (IRL)	15:29
16th	1993	Simon Chemoiywo (KEN)	23:28	Catherina McKiernan (IRL)	15:49
17th	1994	Ismael Kirui (KEN)	23:44	Paula Radcliffe (ENG)	15:40
18th	1995	Ismael Kirui (KEN)	23:21	Rose Cheruiyot (KEN)	15:57
19th	1996	James Kariuki (KEN)	24:02	Paula Radcliffe (ENG)	16:02
20th	1997	Million Wolde (ETH)	23:37	Elena Fidatov (ROU)	15:39
21st	1998	Laban Chege (KEN)	26:16	Mariana Chirila (ROU)	17:59
22nd	1999	Hendrick Ramaala (RSA)	25:06	Anita Weyermann (SUI)	17:03
23rd	2000	Patrick Ivuti (KEN)	24:55	Paula Radcliffe (ENG)	17:18
24th	2001	Daniel Gachara (KEN)	24:18	Paula Radcliffe (ENG)	16:51
25th	2002	Julius Koskei (KEN)	25:06	Esther Kiplagat (KEN)	17:16
26th	2003	Serhiy Lebid (UKR)	24:45	Werknesh Kidane (ETH)	16:46
27th	2004	Paul Tergat (KEN)	28:27	Émilie Mondor (CAN)	18:52
28th	2005	Dathan Ritzenhein (USA)	29:26	Etalemahu Kidane (ETH)	20:26
29th	2006	Barnabas Kosgei (KEN)	28:05	Etalemahu Kidane (ETH)	19:09
30th	2007	Moses Kipsiro (UGA)	28:20	Etalemahu Kidane (ETH)	19:29
31st	2008	Moses Kipsiro (UGA)	30:19	Hayley Yelling (ENG)	21:20
32nd	2009	Imane Merga (ETH)	24:32	Stephanie Twell (ENG)	18:25
33rd	2010	Mike Kigen (KEN)	27:49	Mary Cullen (IRL)	18:45
34th	2011	Mike Kigen (KEN)	26:07	Charlotte Purdue (ENG)	17:57
35th	2012	Mike Kigen (KEN)	34:48	Fionnuala Britton (IRL)	19:32
36th	2013	Thomas Ayeko (UGA)	33:08	Fionnuala Britton (IRL)	18:17
37th	2014	Japhet Korir (KEN)	28:40	Mimi Belete (BHR)	18:07
38th	2015	Thomas Ayeko (UGA)	31:27	Birtukan Fente (ETH)	24:12
39th	2016	Aweke Ayalew (BHR)	21:25	Alice Aprot (KEN)	18:05
40th	2017	Conseslus Kipruto (KEN)	24:36	Caroline Kipkirui (KEN)	18:53
41st	2018	Timothy Cheruiyot (KEN)	23:12	Margaret Kipkemboi (KEN)	19:55
42nd	2019	Birhanu Balew (BHR)	29:42	Meskerem Mamo (ETH)	26:10
43rd	2022	Zakariya Mahamed (GBR)	29:49	Hellen Obiri (KEN)	26:44
44th	2022	Abele Ayana (ETH)	25:24	Medina Eisa (ETH)	21:07

== Statistics ==
=== Winners by country ===
Country	Men's race	Women's race	Total
Kenya	17	7	24
England	8	8	16
Ethiopia	3	6	9
Ireland	3	5	8
Uganda	4	0	4
Scotland	1	2	3
Wales	1	2	3
Bahrain	1	1	2
Romania	0	2	2
Canada	0	1	1
South Africa	1	0	1
Switzerland	0	1	1
Ukraine	1	0	1
United States	1	0	1

=== Multiple winners ===
Athlete	Country	Wins	Years
Paula Radcliffe	Great Britain	4	1994, 1996, 2000, 2001
Mike Kigen	Kenya	3	2010, 2011, 2012
Steve Ovett	Great Britain	2	1978, 1984
Roger Hackney	Great Britain	2	1986, 1987
Ismael Kirui	Kenya	2	1994, 1995
Moses Kipsiro	Uganda	2	2007, 2008
Thomas Ayeko	Uganda	2	2013, 2015
Fionnuala Britton	Ireland	2	2012, 2013
