= Oeiras International Cross Country =

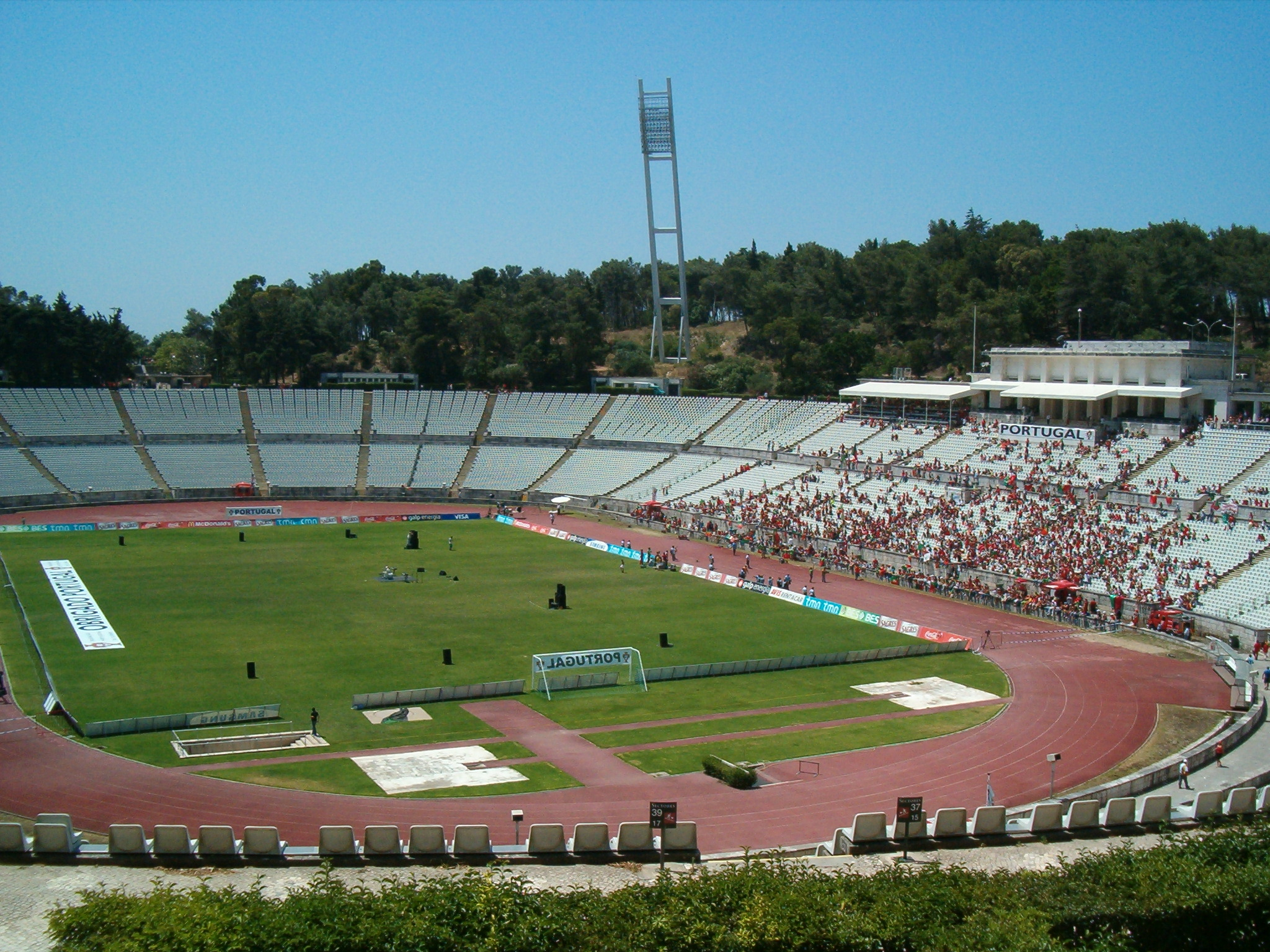
- The Oeiras course is run near the Estádio Nacional
- Date: Mid-November
- Location: Oeiras, Portugal
- Event type: Cross country
- Distance: 9 km for men 5 km for women
- Established: 2000
- Website: Oeiras Cross Country

The Oeiras International Cross Country (Portuguese: Crosse Internacional de Oeiras) is an annual cross country running competition that takes place in Oeiras, Portugal. Established in 2000, it is usually held in mid-November and is traditionally the first competition of the IAAF's cross country season, which culminates each year in the IAAF World Cross Country Championships.

The Oeiras Cross Country has featured athletes such as Kenenisa Bekele, Paul Tergat, Gebregziabher Gebremariam and Felix Limo. The race can be of high importance to Portuguese athletes as the results are often used to decide the national squad for the European Cross Country Championships. The men's race is 9 kilometres long, while the women's race is held over 5 km. In addition to the professional senior races, there are also a number amateur races, including shorter cross country races for children, as well as junior and veteran races.

The course in Jamor is adjacent the Estádio Nacional, the home ground of Portugal's national football team, and is the same circuit that was used for the 1997 European Cross Country Championships and the men's 1999 European Club's Cross Country Cup in 1999. It is a long and hilly course which features a green, scenic setting. The competition is organised by the same group which sets up the Lisbon Half Marathon and the Portugal Half Marathon – the Maratona Clube de Portugal.

The race has previously been broadcast live on television and attracts over 600 runners for the senior races annually. The competition has been sponsored by a number of patrons over its short history, including: Vodafone, Sport Zone, Banco Português de Negócios, Energias de Portugal and Finibanco.

== Past senior race winners ==
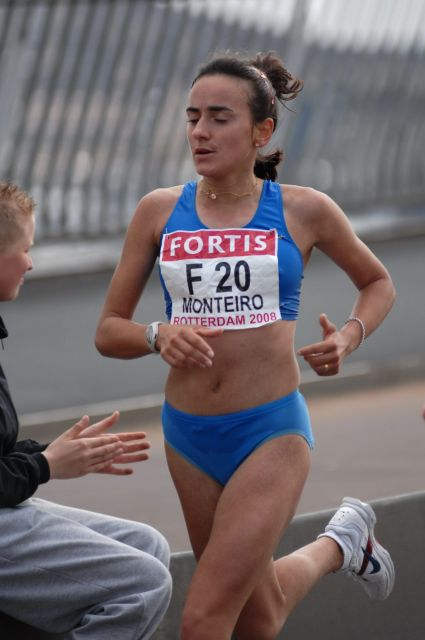
Portuguese athlete Inês Monteiro won on home turf in 2008.

Key: Course record

Edition	Year	Women's winner	Time (m:s)	Men's winner	Time (m:s)
I	2000	Martin Sulle (TAN)	29:48	Carla Sacramento (POR)	19:31
II	2001	Enock Mitei (KEN)	26:10	Leah Malot (KEN)	15:33
III	2002	Kenenisa Bekele (ETH)	24:05	Leah Malot (KEN)	16:01
IV	2003	Kenenisa Bekele (ETH)	27:22	Merima Denboba (ETH)	16:22
V	2004	Tariku Bekele (ETH)	26:28	Alice Timbilil (KEN)	16:34
VI	2005	Ronald Kipchumba Rutto (KEN)	26:27	Elizabeth Rumokol (KEN)	17.36
VII	2006	Peter Kamais (KEN)	26:19	Dorcus Inzikuru (UGA)	17:22
VIII	2007	Imane Merga (ETH)	26:34	Mónica Rosa (POR)	17:29
IX	2008	Titus Masai (KEN)	27:07	Inês Monteiro (POR)	17:31
X	2009	Gebregziabher Gebremariam (ETH)	24:41	Jessica Augusto (POR)	15:39
XI	2010	Teklemariam Medhin (ERI)	28:33	Anália Rosa (POR)	20:01
