= Laudio/Llodio =

Laudio / Llodio
- Municipality
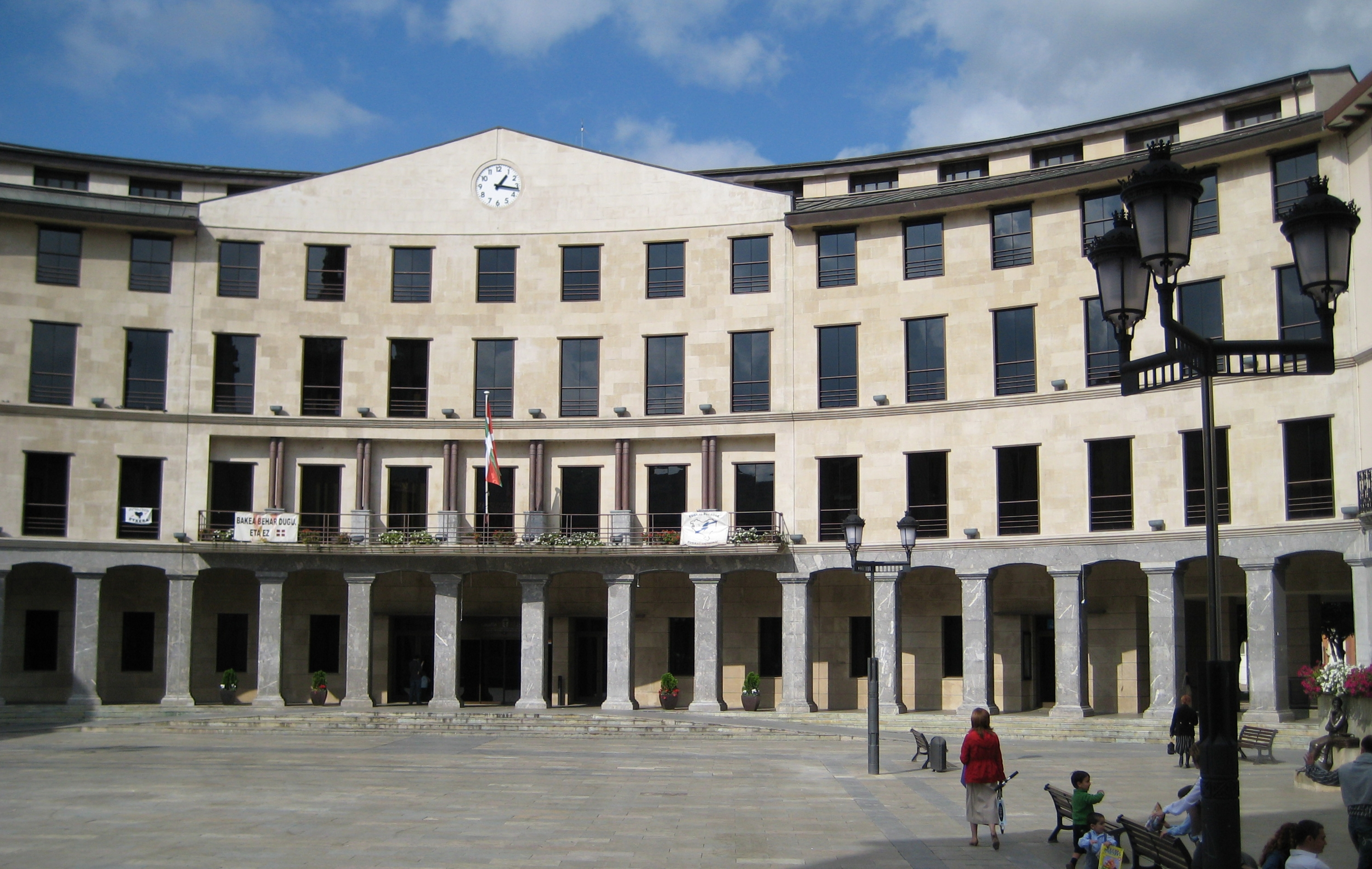
- Town hall of Laudio/Llodio

- Flag Coat of arms

- Location of Laudio/Llodio within the Basque Country
- Coordinates: 43°09′N 2°58′W
- Country: Spain
- Autonomous Community: Basque Country
- Province: Álava
- Comarca: Cuadrilla de Ayala

Government
  - Mayor: Ander Añibarro Maestre

Area
  - Total: 37.56 km^{2} (14.50 sq mi)
- Elevation (AMSL): 130 m (430 ft)

Population (2025-01-01)
  - Total: 18,077
  - Density: 481.3/km^{2} (1,247/sq mi)
- Time zone: UTC+1 (CET)
  - Summer (DST): UTC+2 (CEST (GMT +2))
- Postal code: 01400

Laudio in Basque or Llodio in Spanish is a town and municipality located in the province of Álava, in the Basque Country, northern Spain.

== Geography and Demography ==
Llodio is an important industrial center located at 50 km NW from the provincial capital of Vitoria and at 20 km SE from Bilbao. It is the second municipality of Álava, in population. The municipality has an area of 37,56 km^{2} and a population (2005) of 18,633 (9,288 male, 9,345 female).

== Elections and local administration ==
=== Municipal election ===
Since the 2019 Municipal elections the Mayor of Llodio is Ander Añibarro Maestre (PNV). The Basque Nationalist Party PNV/EAJ has 7 municipal councillors on Llodio Town Council, Bildu has 5, the local group Omnia has 3 while the Socialist Party of the Basque Country–Basque Country Left has 2.

=== General election ===
The results of the 2004 Spanish General Election in Llodio were as follows:

- PNV - Partido Nacionalista Vasco: 37.9%
- PSE-EE (PSOE - EE) Partido Socialista de Euskadi: 27.8%
- PP - Partido Popular: 18.6%
- EB-IU - Izquierda Unida: 6.9%
- EA - Eusko Alkartasuna: 4.8%
- ARALAR-ZUTI - Aralar-Zutik: 2.0%

== Sport ==
The town has a local athletics club, Club de Atletismo de Laudio, which has its own track and field stadium (the Estadio Ellakuri). The club has hosted the Cross Internacional Valle de Llodio, an annual international cross country running event, since 1985.
