= Teklemariam Medhin =

Eritrean long-distance runner (born 1989)

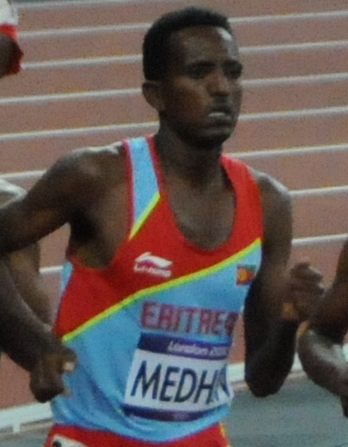
- Teklemariam Medhin at the men's 10000m final - 2012 Summer Olympics

Personal information
- Born: 24 June 1989 (age 37) Hazega, Ethiopia
- Height: 1.84 m (6 ft 0 in)
- Weight: 61 kg (134 lb)

Sport
- Country: Eritrea
- Sport: Track, Long-distance running
- Events: 5000 metres, 10,000 metres

Achievements and titles
- Personal bests: 5000 metres: 13:04.55; 10,000 metres: 27:16.69
- Updated on 22 July 2012

Teklemariam Medhin Weldeslassie (born 24 June 1989) is an Eritrean long-distance runner who specializes in the 5000 metres and 10,000 metres. He represented his country at the 2008 and 2012 Summer Olympics.

== Running career ==
=== Junior career ===
Medhin was born in Hazega. As a junior, he competed in the junior races at the IAAF World Cross Country Championships, finishing thirteenth in 2006 and fourteenth in 2007. He finished twelfth in the 5000 metres at the 2006 World Junior Championships, and also competed in the 2008 Olympic 10,000 metres while still a junior.

=== Senior career ===
At the 2009 World Cross Country Championships he finished ninth in the senior race. The Eritrean team took bronze medals in the team competition. At the 2009 World Championships he finished twelfth in the 10,000 metres and fifteenth in the 5000 metres.

He was the surprise silver medallist in the men's race at the 2010 IAAF World Cross Country Championships and helped the Eritrean team (including Samuel Tsegay and Kidane Tadasse) to another silver. During the track season, he set a new 5000 m best at the Golden Gala in Rome but was a distant eighth in the 10,000 m at the 2010 African Championships in Athletics.

Turning back to cross country in November, he proved himself to be a top competitor on the surface: he won at the Cross Internacional de Atapuerca, defeating World Champion Joseph Ebuya and European Champion Alemayehu Bezabeh, and then beat Kidane Tadese both the Oeiras Cross Country and Cross Internacional Valle de Llodio Ebuya broke his streak of wins at the Cross Internacional de la Constitución, where he was runner-up. At the 2011 IAAF World Cross Country Championships he missed out on a medal as he finished in 14th place on that occasion. At the start of the track season he ran a 10,000 m best of 27:37.21 minutes at the Prefontaine Classic. He suffered a narrow defeat to 17-year-old Hagos Gebrehiwot at the San Silvestre Vallecana at the end of the year.

He was the silver medallist behind Clement Langat at the 2012 African Cross Country Championships and led Eritrea to second in the team competition. A personal best run of 27:16.69 minutes for the 10,000 metres at the FBK Games earned him a place on the Eritrean Olympic team and he went on to finish seventh in the 10,000 m Olympic final. In that winter's cross country circuit he took wins at the Cross de Constitution and Cross de San Sebastian.
