= Cross Internacional Valle de Llodio =

- Date: Late November
- Location: Llodio, Spain
- Event type: Cross country
- Distance: 9.7 km for men 7.6 km for women
- Established: 1985
- Website: Cross Valle de Llodio

The Cross Internacional Valle de Llodio is an annual cross country running competition that takes place in Llodio in the Basque Country, Spain, around late November. The event was first held in February 1985 and changed to an end-of-year competition soon after, holding its second edition in December 1985.

The competition is hosted by the Club de Atletismo de Laudio. The day's events comprise ten races – there are separate international, elite races for men and women over 9760 metres and 7640 m, respectively. Two further races over the same distances are held for amateur runners and there are also three types of age-group races for both male and female runners. The races take place on grassy circuits around the Estadio Ellakuri and wet weather often makes the ground muddy, making the competition more difficult for runners. Around 1000 runners took part in the event in 2009.

The top-finishing runners in the elite races are mainly from Europe (particularly the host country, Spain) and East Africa. Past winners of the competition include double Olympic champion Derartu Tulu, former World Cross Country Champion Gebregziabher Gebremariam and track World Champions Charles Kamathi and Sally Barsosio. Among the Spanish winners of the race are 1995 World Marathon Champion Martín Fiz and Olympian Alessandra Aguilar. Jon Brown's win in 1996 preceded his victory at that year's European Cross Country Championships.

The elite races currently hold permit status from the European Athletics Association and they are used as a selection meeting for the Spanish national team at the European Cross Country Championships, which is held in December. The competition previously held IAAF status from 2004 to 2006. While the men's race has been continuously held over roughly 9–10 km, the women's race has gradually been extended since its inception. Women competed over 4.3 km throughout the 1990s until it was adjusted to a 5.6 km race from 2001 to 2005. Since 2006, the women's course has varied around the 7.5 km mark.

The 2012 edition of the race was not held due to financial constraints.

== Past senior race winners ==
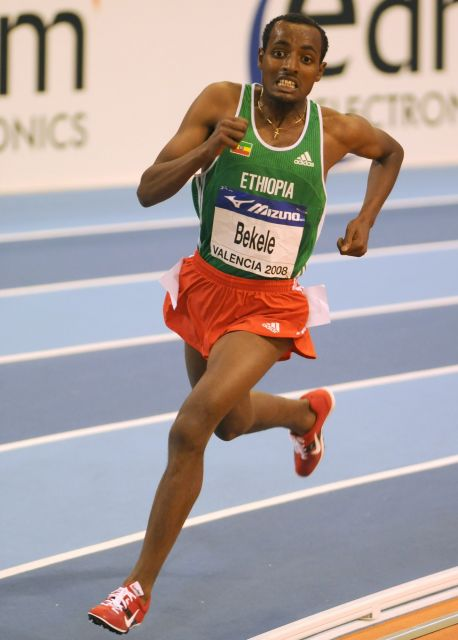
Ethiopian Tariku Bekele has won the race three times – more than any other athlete

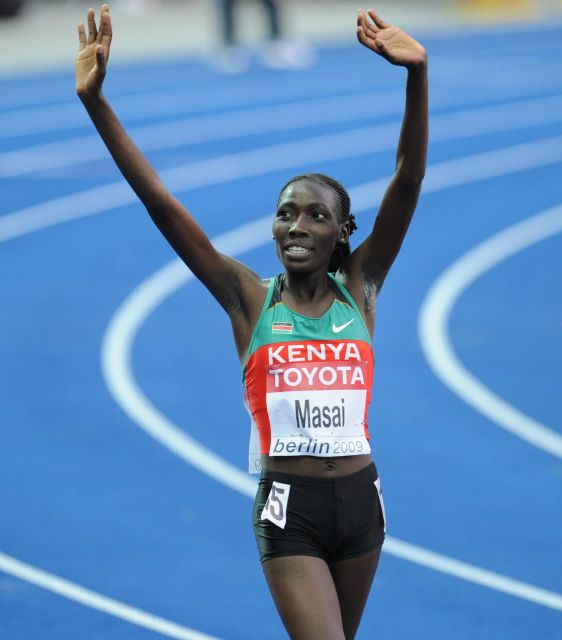
Linet Masai of Kenya took consecutive wins in 2008 and 2009.

| Edition | Year | Men's winner | Time (m:s) | Women's winner | Time (m:s) |
|---|---|---|---|---|---|
| 1st | 1985 | Javier San Martin (ESP) | ? | Lolo Lopo (ESP) | ? |
| 2nd | 1985 | Javier San Martin (ESP) | ? | Asuncion Antolin (ESP) | ? |
| 3rd | 1986 | Valentin Rodriguez (ESP) | ? | Amelia Lorza (ESP) | ? |
| 4th | 1987 | Ezequiel Canario (ESP) | ? | Amelia Lorza (ESP) | ? |
| 5th | 1988 | Martín Fiz (ESP) | ? | Mary Chemweno (KEN) | ? |
| 6th | 1989 | Ezequiel Canario (POR) | ? | Jane Shields (ENG) | ? |
| 7th | 1990 | Wilson Omwoyo (KEN) | 29:09 | Jane Wanjiku Ngotho (KEN) | 12:37 |
| 8th | 1991 | Ondoro Osoro (KEN) | 27:25 | Susan Sirma (KEN) | 13:26 |
| 9th | 1992 | Ondoro Osoro (KEN) | 30:44 | Lydia Cheromei (KEN) | 15:00 |
| 10th | 1993 | Fita Bayisa (ETH) | 27:58 | Sally Barsosio (KEN) | 14:11 |
| 11th | 1994 | Fita Bayisa (ETH) | 28:41 | Derartu Tulu (ETH) | 14:08 |
| 12th | 1995 | Daniel Komen (KEN) | 27:47 | Sally Barsosio (KEN) | 13:40 |
| 13th | 1996 | Jon Brown (ENG) | 31:03 | Gete Wami (ETH) | 15:17 |
| 14th | 1997 | Thomas Nyariki (KEN) | 30:50 | Jackline Maranga (KEN) | 15:02 |
| 15th | 1998 | Luke Kipkosgei (KEN) | 30:57 | Merima Denboba (ETH) | 15:44 |
| 16th | 1999 | Hailu Mekonnen (ETH) | 28:21 | Naomi Mugo (KEN) | 14:18 |
| 17th | 2000 | Abraham Chebii (KEN) | 30:01 | Merima Denboba (ETH) | 15:07 |
| 18th | 2001 | John Yuda (TAN) | 27:01 | Alessandra Aguilar (ESP) | 19:32 |
| 19th | 2002 | Charles Kamathi (KEN) | 26:57 | Salina Kosgei (KEN) | 19:33 |
| 20th | 2003 | Fabiano Joseph (TAN) | 28:19 | Alice Timbilil (KEN) | 19:56 |
| 21st | 2004 | Gebregziabher Gebremariam (ETH) | 26:36 | Werknesh Kidane (ETH) | 18:08 |
| 22nd | 2005 | Tariku Bekele (ETH) | 29:29 | Anikó Kálovics (HUN) | 21:02 |
| 23rd | 2006 | Tariku Bekele (ETH) | 27:08 | Meselech Melkamu (ETH) | 26:13 |
| 24th | 2007 | Joseph Ebuya (KEN) | 27:05 | Meselech Melkamu (ETH) | 23:09 |
| 25th | 2008 | Tariku Bekele (ETH) | 29:31 | Linet Masai (KEN) | 25:12 |
| 26th | 2009 | Teklemariam Medhin (ERI) | 29:08 | Linet Masai (KEN) | 25:11 |
| 27th | 2010 | Teklemariam Medhin (ERI) | 31:24 | Alessandra Aguilar (ESP) | 28:02 |
| 28th | 2011 | Leonard Patrick Komon (KEN) | 29:15 | Nadia Ejjafini (ITA) | 26:03 |
| — | 2012 | Not held | | | |
