= Eurocross =

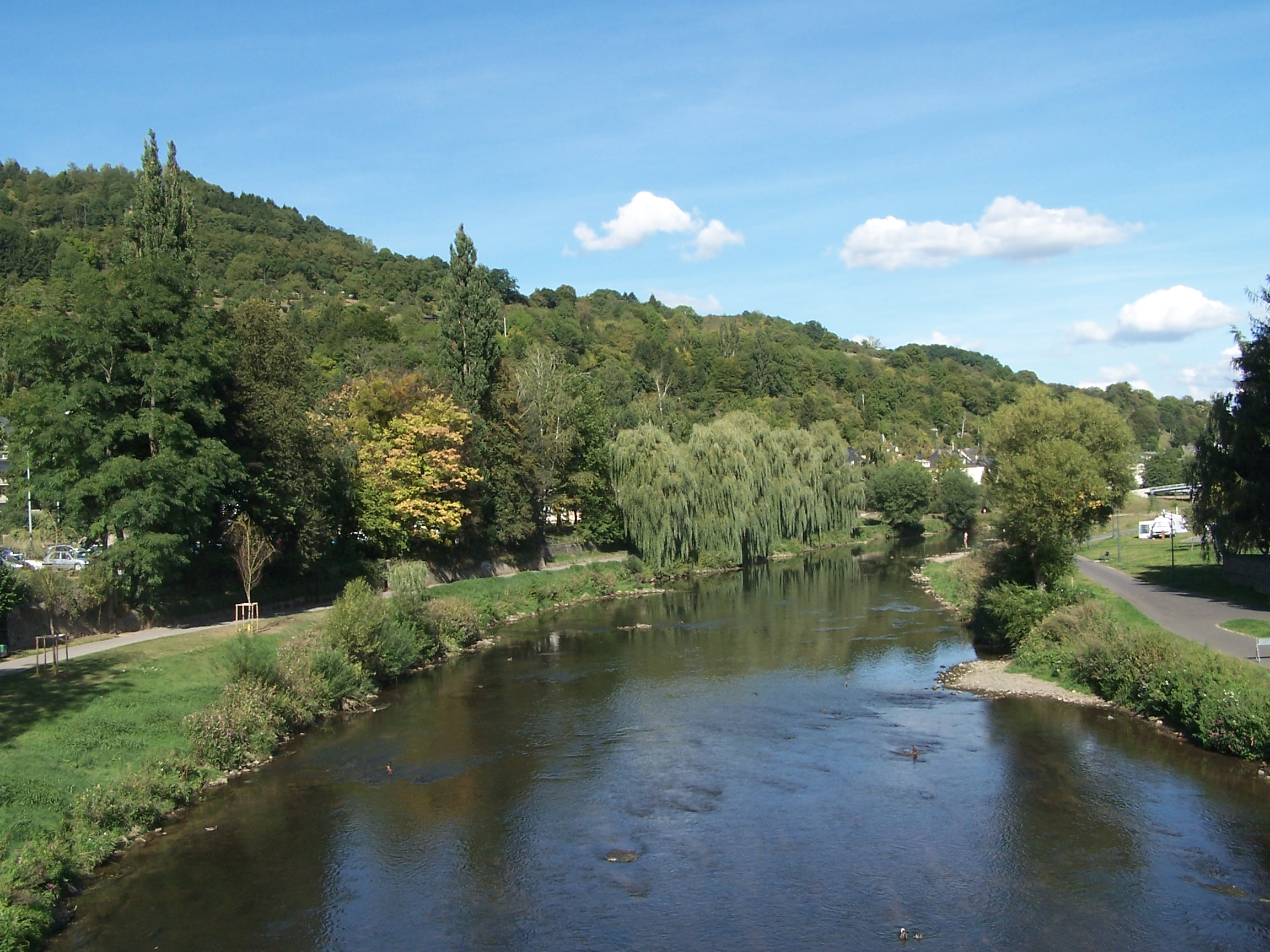
- The Sauer river which is adjacent to the Eurocross course
- Date: February
- Location: Diekirch, Luxembourg
- Event type: Cross country
- Distance: 10.2 km for men 5.3 km for women
- Established: 1969
- Website: Eurocross

Eurocross is an annual international cross country running competition which takes place in Diekirch, Luxembourg in February. It is one of the IAAF permit meetings which serve as qualifying events for the IAAF World Cross Country Championships. It is sponsored by the ING Group.

First held in 1969, Eurocross is organised by the local athletics club (Celtic) and the course follows near the Stade Municipal in Diekirch. There are two major races: a 10.2 km race for men and a 5.3 km race for women. In addition to these primary competitions, there are races for runners of various youth levels, as well as a popular, mass race for amateurs.

The course follows a steep incline up a hill on a stepped dirt path, which then loops back on to downhill section. The race takes place over a number of laps thus the uphill and downhill sections can make for a particularly difficult cross country course.

The main races typically attract international-calibre athletes from Europe and Africa. Past men's winners include IAAF World Cross Country Championships medallist Josephat Machuka and European Championships medallists Mustafa Mohamed and Carsten Jørgensen. The women's side has featured Gabriela Szabo (an Olympic and world champion), 1993 World Cross Country champion Albertina Dias and Dorcus Inzikuru, a steeplechase world champion. The Eurocross typically gives out over US $12,500 in total prize money for each meeting.

The 2010 race, which was the 40th edition of the competition, was held simultaneously with the 94th Luxembourg national cross country championships.

== Past senior race winners ==
Key: Luxembourg championship race

- Note: The women's course was shorter than the typical 5.3 km between 1990 and 2005.

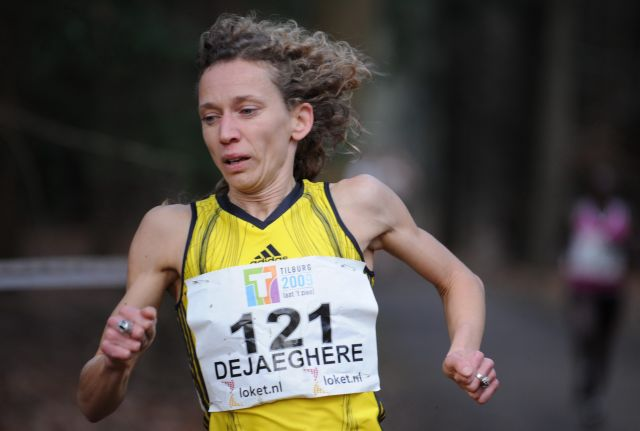
Belgian runner Veerle Dejaeghere won consecutively in 2007 and 2008

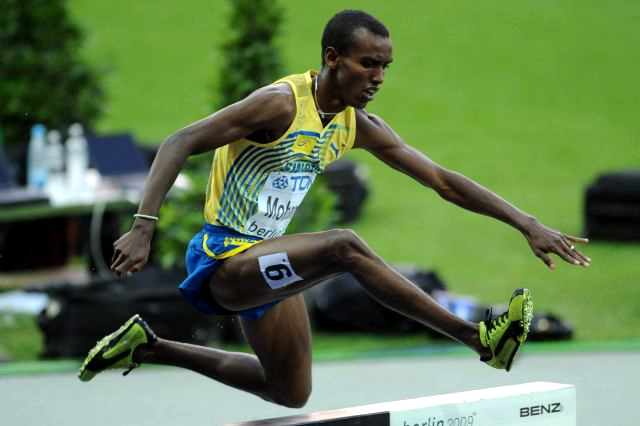
Mustafa Mohamed was the 2006 men's winner

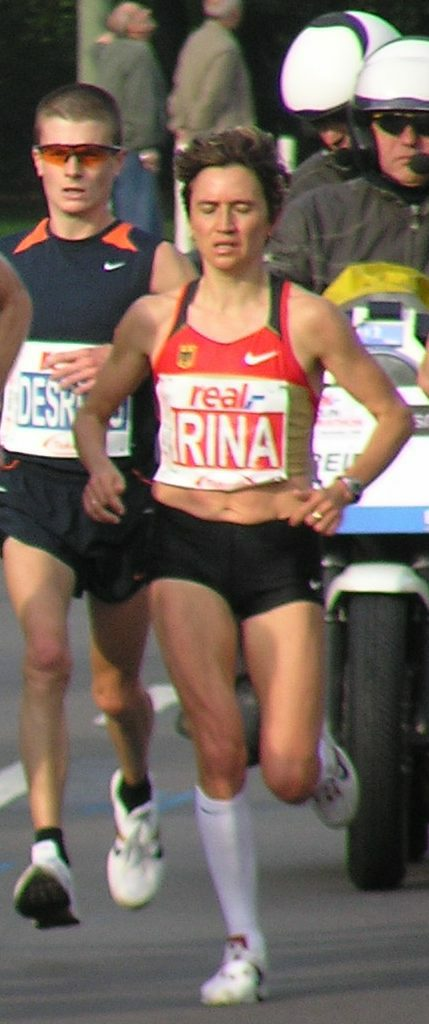
Irina Mikitenko won for a second time in 2000.

Edition	Year	Men's winner	Time (m:s)	Women's winner	Time (m:s)
1st	1969	Fernand Altmann (LUX)	?	—	—
2nd	1970	Domenico Marini (LUX)	?	—	—
—	1971	Not held	—	—	—
3rd	1972	René Kilburg (LUX)	?	—	—
4th	1973	Theo Bock (LUX)	?	—	—
—	1974	Not held	—	—	—
5th	1975	Jean Hoeser (LUX)	?	—	—
6th	1976	Theo Bock (LUX)	?	—	—
7th	1977	Reinhard Leibold (GER)	?	—	—
8th	1978	Reinhard Leibold (GER)	?	—	—
9th	1979	Justin Gloden (LUX)	?	Gabriele Veith (GER)	?
10th	1980	Elie Aubertin (BEL)	?	Sheila Baum (LUX)	?
11th	1981	Pierre Mellina (LUX)	?	?	?
12th	1982	Jean-Claude Petit (LUX)	?	Mady Petit-Scholtes (LUX)	?
13th	1983	Jean-Claude Petit (LUX)	?	Christine Weis (LUX)	?
14th	1984	Jean-Claude Petit (LUX)	?	?	?
15th	1985	Justin Gloden (LUX)	?	?	?
16th	1986	Jean-Claude Petit (LUX)	?	Danièle Kaber (LUX)	?
17th	1987	Joel Bruneau (FRA)	?	?	?
18th	1988	Herbert Steffny (GER)	32:48	Danièle Kaber (LUX)	?
19th	1989	Martin Grüning (GER)	?	?	?
20th	1990	Vincent Rousseau (BEL)	31:31	Uta Pippig (GER)	16:55
21st	1991	Tonnie Dirks (NED)	?	Albertina Dias (POR)	?
22nd	1992	Ezequiel Canario (POR)	32:33	Lieve Slegers (BEL)	16:59
23rd	1993	James Kariuki (KEN)	31:27	Suzanne Rigg (GBR)	16:45
24th	1994	Tendai Chimusasa (ZIM)	30:51	Catherina McKiernan (IRL)	15:54
25th	1995	Dave Lewis (GBR)	33:09	Gabriela Szabo (ROM)	16:53
26th	1996	Tendai Chimusasa (ZIM)	31:57	Colleen De Reuck (RSA)	16:16
27th	1997	Bernard Barmasai (KEN)	30:41	Elena Fidatov (ROM)	15:50
28th	1998	Josephat Machuka (KEN)	30:27	Anita Weyermann (SUI)	16:00
29th	1999	Carsten Jørgensen (DEN)	31:50	Irina Mikitenko (GER)	16:40
30th	2000	Abderrahim Goumri (MAR)	30:18	Irina Mikitenko (GER)	16:12
31st	2001	Abderrahim Goumri (MAR)	30:25	Anja Smolders (BEL)	15:56
32nd	2002	Hamid El Mouaziz (MAR)	30:52	Meryem Boussetta (MAR)	16:04
33rd	2003	Philemon Kemei (KEN)	29:56	Dorcus Inzikuru (UGA)	15:54
34th	2004	Wilson Chemweno (KEN)	30:34	Bouchra Chaâbi (MAR)	15:41
35th	2005	Sultan Khamis Zaman (QAT)	32:06	Natalie Harvey (AUS)	17:09
36th	2006	Mustafa Mohamed (SWE)	30:47	Susanne Ritter (GER)	18:24
37th	2007	Sultan Khamis Zaman (QAT)	32:03	Veerle Dejaeghere (BEL)	18:44
38th	2008	Joel Kimurer (KEN)	29:23	Veerle Dejaeghere (BEL)	17:21
39th	2009	Wilson Kiprop (KEN)	30:27	Mimi Belete (ETH)	18:23
40th	2010	Onesphore Nkunzimana (BDI)	27:17	Mimi Belete (BHR)	17:03
41st	2011	El Hassan El-Abbassi (MAR)	31:27.1	Maryam Jamal (BHR)	19:03.8
42nd	2012	Japheth Korir (KEN)	30:34.1	Almensh Belete (ETH)	18:26
43rd	2013	Albert Rop (KEN)	31:11	Eleni Gebrehiwot (ETH)	19:17
44th	2014	Alex Kibet (KEN)	33:03	Eleni Gebrehiwot (ETH)	20:28
45th	2015	Benedikt Karus (GER)	33:39	Simret Restle (GER)	20:07
46th	2016	Nigussie Tesfaw (ETH)	34:20	Addisalem Demeke (ETH)	21:15
47th	2017	Onesphore Nkunzimana (BDI)	35:23	Sarah Lahti (SWE)	21:11
48th	2018	Ahmed El Mazoury (ITA)	32:43	Elena Burkhardt (GER)	17:11
49th	2019	Artem Kazban (UKR)	35:32	Anna Gehring (GER)	20:25
50th	2020	Andrzej Starzynski (POL)	34:58	Oksana Rayta (UKR)	20:50
