= World Athletics =

World governing body for the sport of athletics

- Abbreviation: WA
- Formation: 18 July 1912; 114 years ago
- Founded at: Stockholm, Sweden
- Type: Sports federation
- Headquarters: 6–8, quai Antoine-1er, Monaco
- Members: 214 member federations
- President: Sebastian Coe
- Revenue: US$55 million (2019)
- Website: worldathletics.org
- Formerly called: IAAF (to October 2019)

World Athletics (WA), formerly known as the International Amateur Athletic Federation and International Association of Athletics Federations and formerly abbreviated as the IAAF, is the international governing body for the sport of athletics, covering track and field, cross country running, road running, race walking, mountain running, and ultra running. Included in its charge is the standardization of rules and regulations for the sports, certification of athletic facilities, recognition and management of world records, and the organisation and sanctioning of athletics competitions, including the World Athletics Championships. The organisation's current president is Sebastian Coe of the United Kingdom, who was elected to the four-year position in 2015, and re-elected twice in 2019 and 2023 for two further four-year terms.

== History ==
The process to found World Athletics began in Stockholm, Sweden, on 18 July 1912, soon after the completion of the 1912 Summer Olympics in that city. At that meeting, 27 representatives from 17 national federations agreed to meet at a congress in Berlin, Germany, the following year, overseen by Sigfrid Edström who was to become the fledgling organisation's first president. The 1913 congress formally completed the founding of what was then known as the International Amateur Athletic Federation (IAAF).

It was headquartered in Stockholm from 1912 to 1946, in London from 1946 to 1993, and thereafter moved to its current location in Monaco.

In 1926, the IAAF created a commission to regulate all ball games that were played by hand, including basketball and handball. Subsequently, the International Amateur Handball Federation was founded in 1928, and the International Basketball Federation was founded in 1932.

Beginning in 1982, the IAAF passed several amendments to its rules to allow athletes to receive compensation for participating in international competitions. However, the organization retained the word amateur in its name until its 2001 congress, at which it changed its name to the International Association of Athletics Federations. In June 2019 the organization chose to rebrand as World Athletics, with a rollout beginning after the 2019 World Championships in Doha.

World Athletics became the last body within the Association of Summer Olympic International Federations to make public its financial reports in 2020, following repeated requests. It revealed the organisation had revenue of around US$200 million spread over a four-year Olympic cycle, with around a fifth of that revenue coming from Olympic broadcasting rights. The reports showed a deficit in each of the non-Olympic years of 2017 and 2018 of around US$20 million. It also showed heavy dependence on its partnership with Japanese marketing agency Dentsu, which made up half of 2018's revenue. It also highlighted reserves of US$45 million at the end of 2018, which would allow the organisation to remain solvent in the face of delays to the 2020 Summer Olympics due to the COVID-19 pandemic. World Athletics Day is celebrated on 7 May.

In 2022, World Athletics imposed sanctions against the Member Federations of Russia and Belarus because of the Russian invasion of Ukraine, and all athletes, support personnel, and officials from Russia and Belarus were excluded from all World Athletics Series events for the foreseeable future, and Russian athletes who had received ANA status for 2022 were excluded from World Athletics Series events for the foreseeable future. World Athletics Council also applied sanctions on the Belarus Athletic Federation, including banning its hosting of any international or European athletics events, representation at Congress or in decisions which require Congressional votes, involvement of its personnel in programs, and accreditation to attend any World Athletics Series events.

In 2024, requests for a similar ban were made for Israeli athletes because of the Gaza war were rejected, saying they want to remain politically neutral, while Russian and Belarusian track and field athletes were still banned, which prevented them from participating in the 2024 Olympics in Paris representing their countries.

== Governance ==
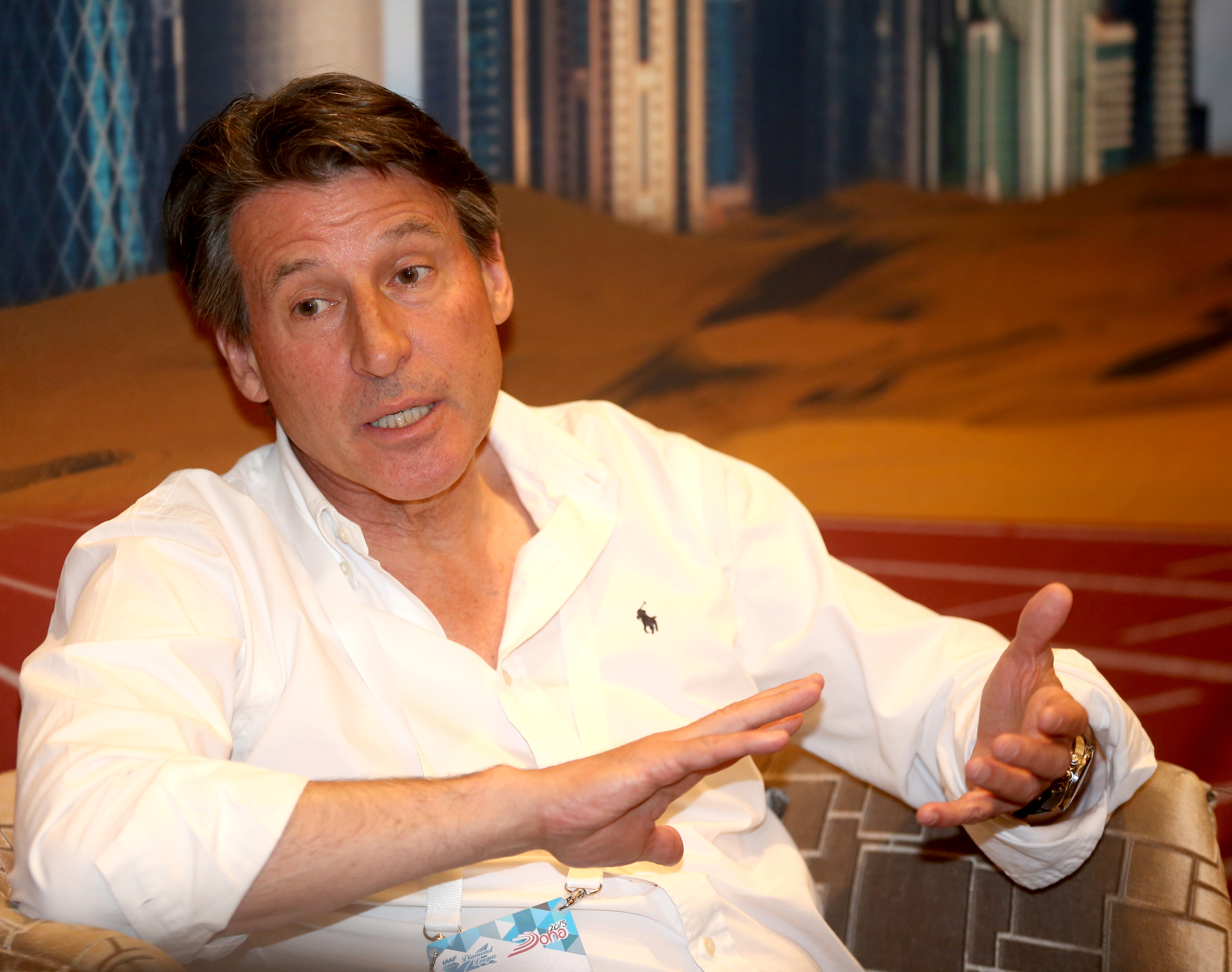
President Sebastian Coe during a media session at the 2015 Doha Diamond League

World Athletics is headed by a president. The World Athletics Council has a total of 26 elected members, comprising one president, four vice-presidents (one senior), the presidents of the six area associations, two members of the Athletes' Commission, and 13 Council members. Each member of the Council is elected for a four-year period by the World Athletics Congress, a biennial gathering of athletics officials that consists of the Council, Honorary Members, and up to three delegates from each of the national member federations. Chairpersons and members of Committees, which manage specialist portfolios, are also elected by the Congress. There are four committees: the Cross Country Committee, the Race Walking Committee, the Technical Committee, and the Women's Committee. A further three committees were launched in 2019: Development, Governance and Competitions. The governance structure is outlined in the World Athletics Constitution, which may be amended by the Congress.

The World Athletics Council appoints a chief executive officer (CEO), who is focused on improving the coverage of the sport and the organisation's commercial interests. This role was created and merged with the General Secretary role that had existed previously. British former athlete and businessman Jon Ridgeon was appointed to the role in December 2018. Olivier Gers was the first person to officially hold the position in 2016, succeeding the interim CEO/General Secretary Jean Gracia.

In order to give active athletes a voice in the governance of the sport, World Athletics created the Athletes' Commission. Athletes are elected to the commission by other athletes, typically held at the Congress attached to the World Athletics Championships. The commission chairperson and one other athlete of the opposite sex are given voting rights on the Council. The last election was held in October 2019 at the 2019 World Athletics Championships.

Following doping and corruption issues, a Code of Ethics was agreed upon in 2013 and an Ethics Commission was appointed in 2014. The Council appoints the chairperson from the elected members, and in turn, the chairperson appoints a deputy chair. The Ethics Board's scope was limited in 2017 with the creation of the independent Athletics Integrity Unit, headed by Australia's Brett Clothier, to oversee ethical issues and complaints at arm's length.

The International Athletics Foundation is a charity closely associated with World Athletics that engages in projects and programmes to develop the sport. Albert II, Prince of Monaco is the Honorary President and the role of IAF President is held by the World Athletics President. A World Athletics Heritage department was created in 2018 to maintain historic artifacts and display them through a physical gallery in Monaco, a virtual online gallery, and a traveling exhibition. The department also issues World Athletics Heritage Plaques to commemorate locations of historic interest to the sport.

=== Presidents ===
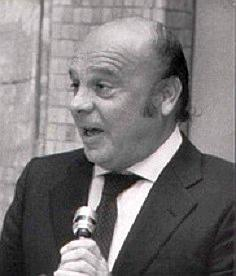
The fourth IAAF president, Primo Nebiolo

There have been six presidents since the establishment of World Athletics:

Name	Country	Presidency
Sigfrid Edström	Sweden	1912–1946
Lord David Burghley	United Kingdom	1946–1976
Adriaan Paulen	Netherlands	1976–1981
Primo Nebiolo	Italy	1981–1999
Lamine Diack	Senegal	1999–2015
Lord Sebastian Coe	United Kingdom	2015–present

=== World Athletics Council ===
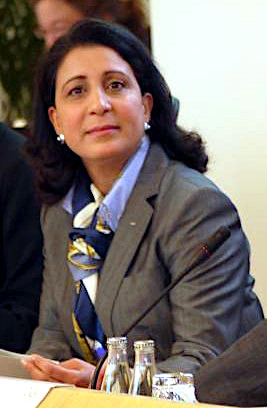
Former athlete and World Athletics Council member Nawal El Moutawakel

Name	Role	Country	Profession
Sebastian Coe	President	United Kingdom	Former athlete and politician
Sergey Bubka	Senior Vice-President	Ukraine	Former athlete
Ximena Restrepo	Vice-President	Colombia	Former athlete
Geoff Gardner	Vice-President Area Association President	Norfolk Island	Politician
Nawaf Bin Mohammed Al Saud	Vice-President	Saudi Arabia	Prince and sports administrator
Hiroshi Yokokawa	Council Member	Japan	Businessman
Antti Pihlakoski	Council Member	Finland	Sports administrator
Anna Riccardi	Council Member	Italy	Translator and sports administrator
Nan Wang	Council Member	China	Sports administrator
Adille Sumariwalla	Council Member	India	Former athlete and businessman
Nawal El Moutawakel	Council Member	Morocco	Former athlete
Abby Hoffman	Council Member	Canada	Former athlete
Sylvia Barlag	Council Member	Netherlands	Former athlete and physicist
Alberto Juantorena	Council Member	Cuba	Former athlete
Willie Banks	Council Member	United States	Former athlete
Raúl Chapado	Council Member	Spain	Former athlete
Dobromir Karamarinov	Council Member	Bulgaria	Former athlete and coach
Beatrice Ayikoru	Council Member	Uganda	Sports administrator
Víctor López	Area Association President	Puerto Rico	Track and field coach
Hamad Kalkaba Malboum	Area Association President	Cameroon	Former athlete and military official
Dahlan Jumaan Al Hamad	Area Association President	Qatar	Sports administrator
Svein Arne Hansen	Area Association President	Norway	Track meet director
Roberto Gesta de Melo	Area Association President	Brazil	Sports administrator
Iñaki Gómez	Athlete's Commission Member	Canada	Former athlete
Valerie Adams	Athlete's Commission Member	New Zealand	Former athlete

=== Athletes' Commission ===
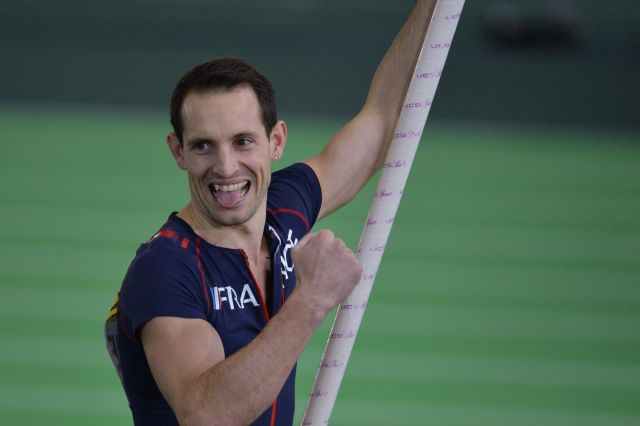
French pole vaulter Renaud Lavillenie was elected to the Athletes' Commission in 2019.

Members elected in 2019

Following

- Renaud Lavillenie (FRA), 627 votes
- Valerie Adams (NZL), 613 votes
- Bernard Lagat (USA), 589 votes
- Kevin Borlée (BEL), 572 votes
- Katerina Stefanidi (GRE), 556 votes
- Aisha Praught-Leer (JAM), votes

Existing members

- Iñaki Gómez (CAN)
- Kim Collins (SKN)
- Adam Kszczot (POL)
- Thomas Röhler (GER)
- Ivana Španović (SRB)
- Benita Willis (AUS)

=== Chairpersons ===
- Athletes' Commission: Iñaki Gómez (CAN)
- Ethics Board: Michael Beloff (GBR)
- Cross Country Committee: Carlos Cardoso (POR)
- Race Walking Committee: Maurizio Damilano (ITA)
- Technical Committee: Jorge Salcedo (POR)
- Women's Committee: Esther Fittko (GER)
- Athletics Integrity Unit: David Howman (NZL)

=== Area associations ===
Map of world with six area associations

World Athletics has a total of 214 member federations divided into 6 area associations.

AAA – Asian Athletics Association in Asia
CAA – Confederation of African Athletics in Africa
CONSUDATLE – Confederación Sudamericana de Atletismo in South America
EAA – European Athletic Association in Europe
NACAC – North American, Central American and Caribbean Athletic Association in North America
OAA – Oceania Athletics Association in Oceania

=== Partner organisations ===
As of 1 November 2015:

- Association of International Marathons and Distance Races (AIMS)
- International Association of Ultrarunners (IAU)
- International Paralympic Committee (IPC Athletics)
- International Trail Running Association (ITRA)
- World Masters Athletics (WMA)
- World Mountain Running Association (WMRA)
- Elite Ltd (for incorporation of statistics from all-athletics.com into World Athletics website)

== Rules and regulations ==
=== Age ===
To allow athletes of different ages to compete against athletes of similar ability, several age categories are maintained. The open class of competition without age limit is defined as "senior". For younger athletes, World Athletics organises events for under-20 athletes (athletes aged 18 or 19 years on 31 December of the year of the competition) as well as under-18 athletes (athletes aged 16 or 17 years on 31 December of the year of the competition), historically referred to as "junior" and "youth" age groups, respectively. Age-group competitions over the age of 35 are organised by World Masters Athletics and are divided into five-year groupings.

=== Doping ===
The organisation is a signatory to the World Anti-Doping Agency's World Anti-Doping Code and applies sanctions to athletes, coaches and other sportspeople who breach the code through doping or impeding any anti-doping actions. Doping is still a serious issue in world athletics due to the increased use of banned substances by athletes to improve their athletic performance. To address the problem, athletes participating in sports are required to sign the World Anti-Doping Agency code and are subjected to random urine or blood samples testing, leading to penalties like game suspension, or lifetime ban for violating code.

=== Sex ===
International level athletics competitions are mostly divided by sex and World Athletics applies eligibility rules for the women's category. World Athletics has regulations for intersex and transgender athletes. The differences of sex development (DSD) regulations apply to athletes who are legally female or intersex and have certain physiology. DSD athletes who are legally female or intersex are subject to specific rules if they have XY male chromosomes, testes rather than ovaries, circulating testosterone in the typical male range (7.7 to 29.4 nmol/L), and are androgen-sensitive so that their bodies make use of that testosterone. World Athletics requires any such athlete to reduce their blood testosterone level to 5 nmol/L or lower for a six-month period before becoming eligible for international competition.

The rules have been challenged by affected athletes in the Court of Arbitration for Sport (CAS), though no athlete has done so successfully. In May 2019, CAS upheld the rules on the basis that discrimination against the minority of DSD athletes was proportional as a method of preserving access to the female category to a much larger majority of women without DSDs.

In 2023, World Athletics tightened their regulations further, excluding transgender women who have gone through male puberty from competing in the female category. The new regulations also reduced the testosterone limit for androgen-sensitive XY DSD athletes to 2.5 nmol/L and extended the limit to apply to all women's events, where it had previously only applied to track events of distances between 400 m and one mile. World Athletics president Sebastian Coe described this as "decisive action to protect the female category in our sport".

=== Equipment ===
Ban on clothing, shoes and other equipment that give an unfair advantage. Such as a max stack height of 40 mm and limiting shoes to one rigid plate per shoe for marathons.

== Certified athletic facilities ==
World Athletics provides approval certificates to venues of athletic facilities: Class 1, Class 2 and Indoor. To receive certification, venues are required to submit measurement reports of their track and field facilities.

Class 1 venues are fully certified along with in-situ tests of the actual synthetic track surface, whilst Class 2 venues only ensures that the synthetic surface has a valid Product Certificate (from an accredited synthetic track surface manufacturer) and the facility conforms to the stringent requirements for accurate measurement contained in World Athletics Rules and Regulations.

== Competitions ==
World Athletics organizes major athletics competitions worldwide.

=== World Athletics Series ===
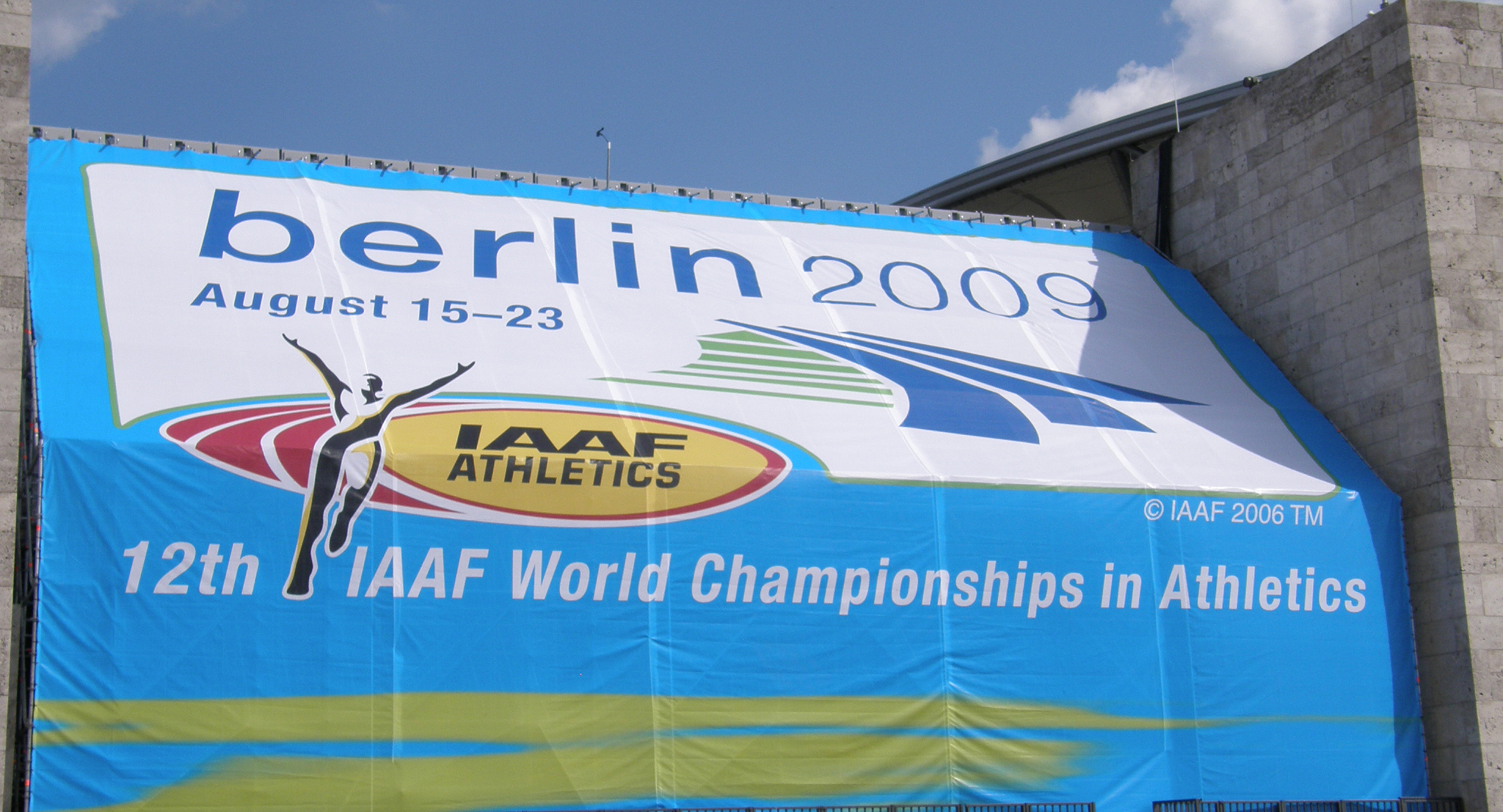
The World Athletics Championships is the foremost athletics competition held by the governing body.

Competition	Sport	Frequency	First held	Last held
World Athletics Championships^{†}	Outdoor athletics	Biennial	1983	Ongoing
World Athletics Indoor Championships	Indoor track and field	Biennial	1985	Ongoing
World Athletics Cross Country Championships	Cross country running	Biennial	1973	Ongoing
World Athletics Road Running Championships^{‡}	Half marathon, 5K run, mile run	Biennial	1992	Ongoing
World Athletics U20 Championships^{††}	Outdoor track and field	Biennial	1986	Ongoing
World Athletics Race Walking Team Championships^{†††}	Racewalking	Biennial	1961	Ongoing
World Athletics Relays	Outdoor track relays	Biennial	2014	Ongoing
World Athletics Ultimate Championships	Outdoor track and field	Biennial	2026	Ongoing
World Athletics Trail and Mountain Running Championships	Trail and mountain running	Biennial	2022	Ongoing
IAAF Continental Cup^{††††}	Outdoor track and field	Quadrennial	1977	2018
IAAF World U18 Championships in Athletics	Outdoor track and field	Biennial	1999	2017
IAAF World Marathon Cup	Marathon	Biennial	1985	2011
IAAF World Road Relay Championships	Ekiden	Biennial	1986	1998
IAAF World Women's Road Race Championships	10K run/15K run	Annual	1983	1991

^{†} Formerly IAAF World Championships in Athletics
^{‡} Known as the World Athletics Half Marathon Championships before 2023, except for in 2006 and 2007 when it was known as the IAAF World Road Running Championships, with a 20 km race in 2006
^{††} Formerly IAAF World Junior Championships
^{†††} Formerly IAAF World Race Walking Cup
^{††††} Formerly IAAF World Cup

=== One-day events ===
Competition	Sport	First held	Last held
Diamond League	Outdoor track and field	2010	Ongoing
World Athletics Continental Tour	Outdoor track and field	2020	Ongoing
World Athletics Indoor Tour	Indoor track and field	2016	Ongoing
World Athletics Label Road Races	Road running	2008	Ongoing
World Athletics Cross Country Tour	Cross country	2021	Ongoing
World Athletics Combined Events Tour	Decathlon/heptathlon	1998	Ongoing
World Athletics Race Walking Tour	Racewalking	2003	Ongoing
World Athletics Cross Country Permit	Cross country	1999	2021
IAAF Hammer Throw Challenge	Hammer throw	2010	2019
IAAF World Challenge	Outdoor track and field	2010	2019
IAAF Indoor Permit Meetings	Indoor track and field	1997	2015
IAAF Race Walking Challenge Final	Racewalking	2007	2012
IAAF World Athletics Tour	Outdoor track and field	2006	2009
IAAF Golden League	Outdoor track and field	1998	2009
IAAF Super Grand Prix	Outdoor track and field	2003	2009
IAAF Grand Prix	Outdoor track and field	1985	2009
IAAF World Athletics Final	Outdoor track and field	2003	2009
IAAF World Outdoor Meetings	Outdoor track and field	2003	2006
IAAF Grand Prix Final	Outdoor track and field	1985	2002
IAAF World Cross Challenge	Cross country	1990	2000
IAAF Golden Events	Outdoor track and field	1978	1982

World Athletics became involved in annual one-day meetings as the sport began to professionalise in the late 1970s. Between 1978 and 1982, World Athletics staged twelve Golden Events, all for men and principally in track running, which saw World Athletics offer prizes to encourage competition. Three years later in 1985, an annual track and field circuit was created in the form of the IAAF Grand Prix, which linked existing top-level one-day meetings with a season-ending IAAF Grand Prix Final for a selection of men's and women's events. The IAAF World Cross Challenge followed in 1990 and began an annual series for cross country running. The track and field circuit was expanded in 1993 with the creation of the IAAF Grand Prix II level, and the IAAF Golden League in 1998. World Athletics began recognising annual indoor track meets via the IAAF Indoor Permit Meetings series in 1997, and in 1998 decathletes and heptathletes found seasonal support with the creation of the IAAF Combined Events Challenge. The World Cross Challenge was disbanded in 2000 and cross country reverted to a permit format via the IAAF Cross Country Permit Meetings. The IAAF Race Walking Challenge was initiated in 2003 to provide a seasonal calendar for racewalking.

World Athletics reformed its track and field circuit in 2003, with the IAAF World Outdoor Meetings series grouping five tiers of annual track and field competitions: the Golden League, IAAF Super Grand Prix, Grand Prix, Grand Prix II, and the IAAF World Athletics Final. The new final format was introduced with a new global performance ranking system for qualification and featured an increased programme of track and field events, mirroring the World Championships in Athletics programme bar the road events, combined events, relays, and the 10,000 metres. The final achieved gender parity in events in 2005, with the inclusion of a women's 3000 metres steeplechase. The track and field circuit was rebranded as the IAAF World Athletics Tour in 2006, which removed the global rankings and the IAAF Grand Prix II (replaced with a level of meetings given permit status by continental governing bodies). With World Athletics having recognised the sport of mountain running in 2002, the annual WMRA World Cup meetings received official sanctioning in 2006, organised under World Mountain Running Association. The IAAF Race Walking Challenge Final was created in 2007 to serve as a seasonal final for the Race Walking Challenge. World Athletics designed a sanctioning process for the road running competitions in 2008, with races having to meet organisational requirements to achieve Gold or Silver status under the IAAF Road Race Label Events brand. This incorporated the World Marathon Majors (a privately run series for major marathons initiated in 2006) within the Gold Label category. Road running was the last sport governed by World Athletics to receive seasonal sanctioning.

The 2010 season saw several changes to World Athletics' one-day governance. The World Athletics Tour was made defunct and replaced with three separate series: the 14-meet Diamond League as the top level of track meetings, the IAAF World Challenge as a second tier of track meetings, and the IAAF Hammer Throw Challenge as the top level of hammer throwing contests (as hammer was not included in the Diamond League). The Road Race Label grouping was also expanded that year with the creation of a Bronze label status. The Race Walking Challenge Final was removed from the racewalking schedule after 2012, as the series focused on international championship performances. In 2016, the IAAF World Indoor Tour was introduced as a replacement of the Indoor Permit Meetings series.

The track and field circuit is due for further changes in 2020, including an increase in the number of Diamond League meetings, the reduction of Diamond League events from 32 to 24, reduction of the Diamond League television running time to 90 minutes, the creation of a one-day Diamond League final, and the relaunch of the World Challenge series as the World Athletics Continental Tour.

== Awards ==
The organisation hosts the annual World Athletics Awards, formerly the World Athletics Gala until 2017, at the end of each year to recognise the achievements of athletes and other people involved in the sport. Members may also be inducted into the IAAF Hall of Fame as part of the ceremony. The following awards are given:

- Male Athlete of the Year
- Female Athlete of the Year
- Male Rising Star Award
- Female Rising Star Award
- Coaching Achievement Award
- Distinguished Career Award
- Women's Award
- President's Award
- Athletics Photograph of the Year

Separately, the World Athletics Heritage Plaque award was launched in December 2018. The plaque is a location-based recognition that can be awarded in five different and broad overlapping categories: city, competition, legend, landmark, culture. Each year the World Athletics will periodically award plaques taking advantage of appropriate moments in the international athletics calendar to make those announcements.

== Doping controversy ==
In 2015, a whistleblower leaked World Athletics' blood test records from major competitions. The records revealed that, between 2001 and 2012, athletes with suspicious drug test results won a third of the medals in endurance events at the Olympics and World Championships—a total of 146 medals including 55 golds—but the World Athletics caught none of them. After reviewing the results, Robin Parisotto, a scientist and leading "anti-doping" expert, said, "Never have I seen such an alarmingly abnormal set of blood values. So many athletes appear to have doped with impunity, and it is damning that the IAAF appears to have idly sat by and let this happen." Craig Reedie, president of the World Anti-Doping Agency (WADA), said his organisation was "very disturbed by these new allegations ... which will, once again, shake the foundation of clean athletes worldwide", and that its "independent commission will investigate the claims".

Around the same time, the University of Tübingen in Germany claimed that World Athletics suppressed publication of a 2011 report in which "[h]undreds of athletes", as many as a third of the world's top athletes, "admitted violating anti-doping rules".

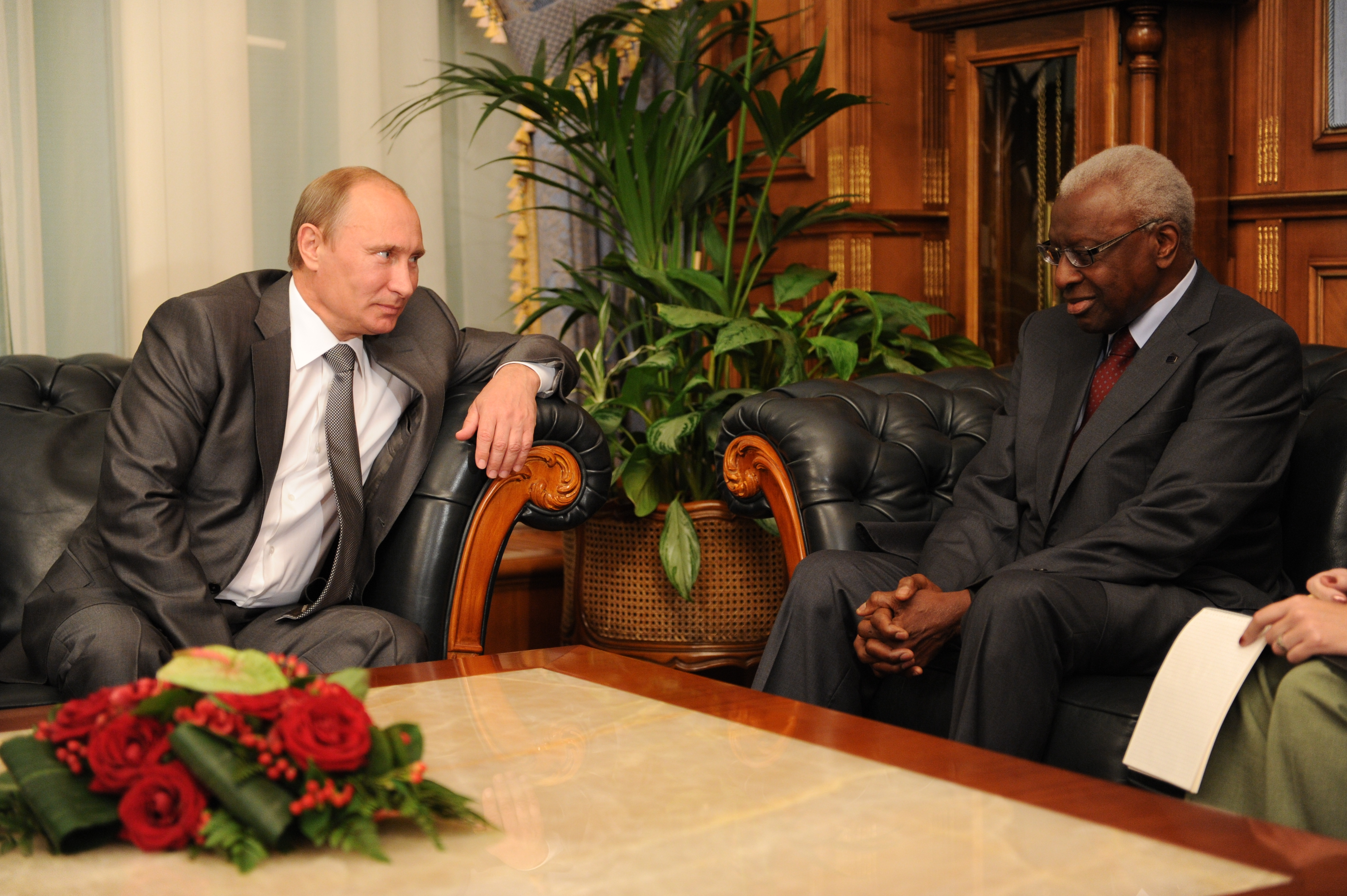
Vladimir Putin and Lamine Diack

On 1 November 2015, former World Athletics president Lamine Diack was arrested in France and is under investigation on suspicion of corruption and money laundering. Diack allegedly accepted "$1.2 million from the Russian athletics federation to cover up the positive doping tests of at least six Russian athletes in 2011." The IOC provisionally suspended Diack, and he resigned his position as an IOC Honorary Member. In 2016, the World Anti-Doping Agency reported that with his influence, Diack was able to install two of his sons and a friend into positions that exerted influence over the IAAF. The report says that Lamine Diack "was responsible for organizing and enabling the conspiracy and corruption that took place in the IAAF." In 2018, Diack was handed an additional charge of "breach of trust" by French prosecutors. On 18 June 2020, the trial of Diack and five other people, including his son, concluded. Diack was sentenced to jail for four years, two of them suspended.

In November 2015, WADA published its report, which found "systemic failures" in the World Athletics had prevented an "effective" anti-doping programme and concluded that Russia should be banned from competing in international competitions because of its athletes' test results. The report continued that "the World Athletics allowed the conduct to occur and must accept its responsibility" and that "corruption was embedded" in the organization.

In January 2016, as a result of the doping scandal and WADA's report, the World Athletics' biggest sponsor, Adidas, announced that it was ending its sponsorship deal with the World Athletics four years early. The BBC reported that as a result World Athletics would lose $33 million (£23 million) worth of revenue. The 11-year sponsorship deal with Adidas was due to run until 2019. World-record holding sprinter Michael Johnson described the scandal as more serious than that faced by FIFA. In February 2016, Nestlé announced that it was ending its World Athletics sponsorship.

In June 2016, following a meeting of the IAAF's ruling council, World Athletics upheld its ban on Russia's track and field team from entering the Rio de Janeiro Olympics. In February 2017, All-Russia Athletic Federation was disqualified by decision of the World Athletics Council for eight years for the creation of a doping system.

World Athletics has since resisted demands that Russia be re-instated, on the basis that the country repeatedly failed to satisfy all the agreed criteria. The decision was supported by Sean Ingle of The Guardian who wrote in a column that World Athletics should maintain their ban on Russia through the 2016 Olympics in Rio. That meant Russian athletes could not compete at all major events in the following years, including the 2017 IAAF World Championships in London and the 2018 European Championships in Berlin. In September 2018, World Athletics faced a legal challenge by Russia to overturn the suspension after the reinstatement of the Russian Anti-Doping Agency, but Hugo Lowell of the i newspaper reported the country's status would not change. The legal case was later dropped.

== Russian suspension ==
World Athletics was the first international sporting body to suspend the Russian Athletics Federation (RAF) from World Athletics starting in 2015, for eight years, due to doping violations, making it ineligible to host World Athletics events or send teams to international championships. However, Russian athletes were eligible to compete pursuant to the Authorised Neutral Athlete (ANA) process.

In 2022, though, World Athletics imposed sanctions against the Member Federations of Russia and Belarus because of the Russian invasion of Ukraine, and all athletes, support personnel, and officials from Russia and Belarus were excluded from all World Athletics Series events for the foreseeable future, and Russian athletes who had received ANA status for 2022 were excluded from World Athletics Series events for the foreseeable future. World Athletics Council also applied sanctions on the Belarus Athletic Federation, including banning its hosting of any international or European athletics events, representation at Congress or in decisions which require Congressional votes, involvement of its personnel in programs, and accreditation to attend any World Athletics Series events.

In March 2023, the World Athletics Council restored the full-fledged status of the RAF. In March 2026, doping-related sanctions have been lifted.

== See also ==
- List of doping cases in athletics
- List of eligibility transfers in athletics
- World Athletics Rankings
