= 2009 IAAF World Cross Country Championships – Junior men's race =

Junior men's race at the 2009 IAAF World Cross Country Championships
- Organisers: IAAF
- Edition: 37th
- Date: March 28
- Host city: Amman, Jordan
- Venue: Al Bisharat Golf Course
- Events: 1
- Distances: 8 km – Junior men
- Participation: 119 athletes from 29 nations

The Junior men's race at the 2009 IAAF World Cross Country Championships was held at the Al Bisharat Golf Course in Amman, Jordan, on March 28, 2009. Reports of the event were given in The New York Times and for the IAAF.

Complete results for individuals, and for teams were published.

== Race results ==
=== Junior men's race (8 km) ===
==== Individual ====
Rank	Athlete	Country	Time
1st place, gold medalist(s)	Ayele Abshero	Ethiopia	23:26
2nd place, silver medalist(s)	Titus Kipjumba Mbishei	Kenya	23:30
3rd place, bronze medalist(s)	Moses Kibet	Uganda	23:35
4	Paul Kipngetich Tanui	Kenya	23:35
5	Japheth Kipyegon Korir	Kenya	23:36
6	Atalay Yirsaw	Ethiopia	23:38
7	Gashaw Biftu	Ethiopia	23:44
8	Debebe Woldsenbet	Ethiopia	23:52
9	John Kipkoech	Kenya	24:00
10	John Kemboi Cheruiyot	Kenya	24:08
11	German Fernandez	United States	24:13
12	Dieudonné Nsengiyuma	Burundi	24:16
13	Charles Kibet Chepkurui	Kenya	24:17
14	Goitom Kifle	Eritrea	24:18
15	Chris Derrick	United States	24:20
16	Legese Lamiso	Ethiopia	24:20
17	Dickson Huru	Uganda	24:21
18	Mulue Andom	Eritrea	24:23
19	Nassir Dawud	Eritrea	24:32
20	Youssef Nasir	Morocco	24:33
21	Merhawi Tadesse	Eritrea	24:34
22	Olivier Iradukunda	Burundi	24:35
23	Li Zicheng	China	24:38
24	Ryan Gregson	Australia	24:40
25	Timothy Toroitich	Uganda	24:43
26	Alemu Bekele	Bahrain	24:44
27	Akinobu Murasawa	Japan	24:46
28	Edwin Chebii Kimurer	Bahrain	24:49
29	Harry Summers	Australia	24:52
30	Luke Puskedra	United States	24:53
31	Adil Rached	Morocco	24:54
32	Yetwale Kende	Ethiopia	24:59
33	Gebrebrhan Tesfamariam	Eritrea	25:01
34	Abraham Tewelde	Eritrea	25:03
35	Adam Haroon	Sudan	25:08
36	Richard Everest	Australia	25:16
37	Bernard Kibekei Cheptoch	Uganda	25:19
38	Ronald Kiprotich	Uganda	25:19
39	Sylvain Nyandwi	Burundi	25:25
40	Wataru Ueno	Japan	25:30
41	Isaac Kemboi Chelimo	Bahrain	25:31
42	Shota Hattori	Japan	25:32
43	Azzeddine Feraoun	Morocco	25:32
44	Kazuto Nishiike	Japan	25:39
45	Kenta Chiba	Japan	25:44
46	Brett Robinson	Australia	25:47
47	Mfumaneko Fadane	South Africa	25:51
48	Patrick Dupont	United States	25:52
49	Hicham Sigueni	Morocco	25:56
50	Andrey Dmitriev	Russia	25:58
51	Almahjoub Dazza	Morocco	25:58
52	Ryan Hill	United States	26:04
53	Joel Mmone	South Africa	26:05
54	Yahya El Mekkaoui	Morocco	26:06
55	Mario Mola	Spain	26:09
56	Nyjal Majock	Canada	26:12
57	Mohammed Ahmed	Canada	26:13
58	Tom Farrell	United Kingdom	26:13
59	Ameur Maouni	Algeria	26:13
60	Moussa Ziane	Algeria	26:15
61	Éderson Pereira	Brazil	26:17
62	Francisco Medrano	United States	26:18
63	Boubakar El Seddik Becharef	Algeria	26:19
64	Hassan Ismail	Sudan	26:22
65	Sityhilo Diko	South Africa	26:24
66	Diaaeldin Hassan Ahmed	Sudan	26:30
67	Antonio Abadía	Spain	26:30
68	Antonio Guzzi	Italy	26:31
69	David Ricketts	Australia	26:32
70	Sami Lafi	Algeria	26:32
71	Dario Santoro	Italy	26:33
72	Folavia Sehohle	South Africa	26:36
73	Yutaro Fukushi	Japan	26:38
74	Sondre Nordstad Moen	Norway	26:39
75	Vincent Boucena	France	26:42
76	Mohammed El Amin Cheouaf	Algeria	26:43
77	José Costa	Portugal	26:43
78	Aitor Fernández	Spain	26:46
79	Adam Abdelmunaim	Sudan	26:48
80	Aleksandr Kuternin	Canada	26:52
81	Nabil Mohammed Al-Garbi	Yemen	26:55
82	Martín Ortiz	Spain	26:58
83	Ronnie Sparke	United Kingdom	26:59
84	Mohamed Saad	Tunisia	27:03
85	James Wilkinson	United Kingdom	27:04
86	Joshua Johnson	Australia	27:08
87	Ali Mohammed Al-Khawlani	Yemen	27:08
88	Simon Denissel	France	27:14
89	Windy Jonas	South Africa	27:17
90	Jonathan Hay	United Kingdom	27:17
91	John Paul Malette	Canada	27:18
92	Hamid Abdelghani	Sudan	27:19
93	James Leakos	Canada	27:20
94	Valdison Silva	Brazil	27:25
95	Jaime Villa	Spain	27:27
96	Waleed Saleh Elayah	Yemen	27:30
97	Mubarak Musa	Sudan	27:32
98	Vuyisile Tshoba	South Africa	27:37
99	Mattias Wolter	Canada	27:39
100	Anselme Manirazika	Burundi	27:42
101	Ali Hussein Al-Abidi	Yemen	27:49
102	Anes Traikia	Algeria	28:03
103	Salameh Al-Hayawi	Jordan	28:04
104	Maamoun Bali	Palestine	28:20
105	Waleed Mohammed Al-Abidi	Yemen	28:29
106	Hamza Barhumah	Jordan	28:31
107	Fares Hassan	Libya	28:42
108	Yazan Abunaja	Jordan	28:53
109	Ra'ed Abumharab	Jordan	29:00
110	Motasem Akkawi	Jordan	29:26
111	Omar Mourad	Kuwait	30:59
112	Abdullateef Al Rweih	Kuwait	31:31
113	Pierre-Célestin Nihorimbere	Burundi	31:54
115	Manea Alajmi	Kuwait	33:16
117	Abdullah Rabeaa	Kuwait	34:02
—	Hasan Al-Najjar	Jordan	DNF
—	Nick Goolab	United Kingdom	DNF
—	Bilel Aloui	Tunisia	DNF
—	Simon Horsfield	United Kingdom	DNF

==== Teams ====
Rank	Team	Points
1st place, gold medalist(s)	Kenya: Titus Kipjumba Mbishei / 2; Paul Kipngetich Tanui / 4; Japheth Kipyegon Korir / 5; John Kipkoech / 9; (John Kemboi Cheruiyot) / (10); (Charles Kibet Chepkurui) / (13)	20
2nd place, silver medalist(s)	Ethiopia: Ayele Abshero / 1; Atalay Yirsaw / 6; Gashaw Biftu / 7; Debebe Woldsenbet / 8; (Legese Lamiso) / (16); (Yetwale Kende) / (32)	22
3rd place, bronze medalist(s)	Eritrea: Goitom Kifle / 14; Mulue Andom / 18; Nassir Dawud / 19; Merhawi Tadesse / 21; (Gebrebrhan Tesfamariam) / (33); (Abraham Tewelde) / (34)	72
4	Uganda: Moses Kibet / 3; Dickson Huru / 17; Timothy Toroitich / 25; Bernard Kibekei Cheptoch / 37; (Ronald Kiprotich) / (38)	82
5	United States: German Fernandez / 11; Chris Derrick / 15; Luke Puskedra / 30; Patrick Dupont / 48; (Ryan Hill) / (52); (Francisco Medrano) / (62)	104
6	Australia: Ryan Gregson / 24; Harry Summers / 29; Richard Everest / 36; Brett Robinson / 46; (David Ricketts) / (69); (Joshua Johnson) / (86)	135
7	Morocco: Youssef Nasir / 20; Adil Rached / 31; Azzeddine Feraoun / 43; Hicham Sigueni / 49; (Almahjoub Dazza) / (51); (Yahya El Mekkaoui) / (54)	143
8	Japan: Akinobu Murasawa / 27; Wataru Ueno / 40; Shota Hattori / 42; Kazuto Nishiike / 44; (Kenta Chiba) / (45); (Yutaro Fukushi) / (73)	153
9	Burundi: Dieudonné Nsengiyuma / 12; Olivier Iradukunda / 22; Sylvain Nyandwi / 39; Anselme Manirazika / 100; (Pierre-Célestin Nihorimbere) / (113)	173
10	South Africa: Mfumaneko Fadane / 47; Joel Mmone / 53; Sityhilo Diko / 65; Folavia Sehohle / 72; (Windy Jonas) / (89); (Vuyisile Tshoba) / (98)	237
11	Sudan: Adam Haroon / 35; Hassan Ismail / 64; Diaaeldin Hassan Ahmed / 66; Adam Abdelmunaim / 79; (Hamid Abdelghani) / (92); (Mubarak Musa) / (97)	244
12	Algeria: Ameur Maouni / 59; Moussa Ziane / 60; Boubakar El Seddik Becharef / 63; Sami Lafi / 70; (Mohammed El Amin Cheouaf) / (76); (Anes Traikia) / (102)	252
13	Spain: Mario Mola / 55; Antonio Abadía / 67; Aitor Fernández / 78; Martín Ortiz / 82; (Jaime Villa) / (95)	282
14	Canada: Nyjal Majock / 56; Mohammed Ahmed / 57; Aleksandr Kuternin / 80; John Paul Malette / 91; (James Leakos) / (93); (Mattias Wolter) / (99)	284
15	United Kingdom: Tom Farrell / 58; Ronnie Sparke / 83; James Wilkinson / 85; Jonathan Hay / 90; (Nick Goolab) / (DNF); (Simon Horsfield) / (DNF)	316
16	Yemen: Nabil Mohammed Al-Garbi / 81; Ali Mohammed Al-Khawlani / 87; Waleed Saleh Elayah / 96; Ali Hussein Al-Abidi / 101; (Waleed Mohammed Al-Abidi) / (105)	365
17	Jordan: Salameh Al-Hayawi / 103; Hamza Barhumah / 106; Yazan Abunaja / 108; Ra'ed Abumharab / 109; (Motasem Akkawi) / (110); (Hasan Al-Najjar) / (DNF)	426
18	Kuwait: Omar Mourad / 111; Abdullateef Al Rweih / 112; Mohamad Nodum / 114; Manea Alajmi / 115; (Hamad Salem) / (116); (Abdullah Rabeaa) / (117)	452

- Note: Athletes in parentheses did not score for the team result.

== Participation ==
According to an unofficial count, 119 athletes from 29 countries participated in the Junior men's race. This is in agreement with the official numbers as published.

- Algeria (6)
- Australia (6)
- Bahrain (3)
- Brazil (2)
- Burundi (5)
- Canada (6)
- China (1)
- Eritrea (6)
- Ethiopia (6)
- France (2)
- Italy (2)
- Japan (6)
- Jordan (6)
- Kenya (6)
- Kuwait (4)
- Libya (1)
- Morocco (6)
- Norway (1)
- Palestine (1)
- Portugal (1)
- Russia (1)
- South Africa (6)
- Spain (5)
- Sudan (6)
- Tunisia (2)
- Uganda (5)
- United Kingdom (6)
- United States (6)
- Yemen (5)

== See also ==
- 2009 IAAF World Cross Country Championships – Senior men's race
- 2009 IAAF World Cross Country Championships – Senior women's race
- 2009 IAAF World Cross Country Championships – Junior women's race
