= Neely Spence Gracey =

American long-distance runner

Personal information
- Nationality: American
- Born: April 16, 1990 (age 36) Chambersburg, Pennsylvania, U.S.
- Home town: Shippensburg, Pennsylvania, U.S.
- Education: Shippensburg University '12; Human Communications
- Height: 5 ft 5 in (1.65 m)
- Spouse: Dillon Gracey (2012-present)
- Children: 3
- Father: Steve Spence
- Website: https://getrunningcoaching.com/

Sport
- Country: United States
- Events: 5000 m, half marathon, marathon
- College team: Shippensburg Raiders
- Club: Adidas
- Turned pro: December 2011
- Coached by: Steve Magness; Dillon Gracey (2019-present)

Achievements and titles
- Personal best: Half Marathon: 1:09:59 (2015) Marathon: 2:30:29 (2022)

Neely Spence Gracey (born 16 April 1990) is an American long-distance runner who competes in distances from 5000 metres to the marathon. She twice represented her country at the IAAF World Cross Country Championships and was the top non-African runner in 2013. She also ran at the 2011 Pan American Games.

She attended Shippensburg University and won eight NCAA Division II titles while there. She ran her first half marathon in 2013 then made a marathon debut at the 2016 Boston Marathon, where she was the top American woman. She is the daughter of former marathon runner Steve Spence.

== Career ==
=== Early life and college ===
Spence Gracey was born to Kirsten and Steve Spence. Her father was a world championship medallist in the marathon and her mother was a high standard amateur runner. Born on the day her father ran at the 94th Boston Marathon, she grew up in Shippensburg, Pennsylvania and soon took up running herself. Home-schooled by her parents, she began taking part in road races in her early teens and showed an aptitude for the sport.

She went on to study Human Communications at Shippensburg University and ran for their Shippensburg Raiders collegiate team, as her father had done. Although the institution was not in the top level of collegiate sports, Spence Gracey performed well in NCAA Division II competition. She was an eight-time champion in NCAA Division II races, including back-to-back wins at the NCAA Women's Division II Cross Country Championship from 2010 to 2011. She broke Pennsylvania State Athletic Conference (PSAC) records in the 3000-meter run and 5000-meter run indoors and outdoors, as well as several distance medley relay records. She won 17 PSAC regional titles and was named the conference athlete of the year for all her seasons while at Shippensburg from 2008 to 2011.

=== International and professional career ===
Spence Gracey made her international debut while still at college. She ran as a junior at the 2009 IAAF World Cross Country Championships and her 19th-place finish led the American junior women to fifth in the team competition. A seventh-place run in the 5000 m at the 2011 USA Outdoor Track and Field Championships brought Spence Gracey her first senior international selection. She came eighth over that distance at the 2011 Pan American Games, closely behind fellow American Kim Conley. Having finished college, she came runner-up at the USATF National Club Cross Country Championships in late 2011.

She came fourth at the high-profile Great Edinburgh Cross Country in early 2012, but suffered an ankle injury which, alongside Lyme disease, ultimately curtailed her season and caused her to miss the Olympic trials. That year she married her husband Dillon Gracey, who also served as her coach. She began to heal towards the end of the year and ran a leg of the International Chiba Ekiden, anchoring the American team to third in the rankings behind the perennially strong Kenyan and Japanese teams. In her last race of 2012 she won the Zatopek Classic 10,000-meter run on her debut for the distance.

Fifth place at the 2013 USA Cross Country Championships gained her a spot on the senior national team. At the 2013 IAAF World Cross Country Championships she emerged as a top level runner by finishing 13th – this was the best performance by a non-African-born runner at the competition, narrowly ahead of European champion Fionnuala McCormack. She began to turn to road running that season and won some low level races and made her half marathon debut, though 82:57 minutes did not represent a fast time. The 2014 season was marred by a knee injury which required surgery on her patella – her kneecaps had not fully fused as a child and her running had caused inflammation.

Spence Gracey returned to running towards the end of 2014 and early 2015 saw her improve to 72:39 minutes in the half marathon as runner-up at the Gasparilla Distance Classic. After third place at the Gate River Run she won the Garry Bjorklund Half Marathon in a new personal record of 71:27 minutes. Other outings were fourth at the Falmouth Road Race, second at the USA 10-mile championships, and runner-up at the Rock 'n' Roll Philadelphia Half Marathon. Though another best of 69:59 minutes came for Spence Gracey at the latter race, the cost was a foot injury that caused her to skip the Olympic Marathon Trials.

She opened 2016 with a win at the Rock ‘n’ Roll Mardi Gras Half Marathon and then followed in her father's footsteps by entering the 2016 Boston Marathon. At the race she made a successful debut in 2:35:00 hours – the top American performer that year, and ninth overall. Neely finished second behind Buze Diribe at 2016 AACR Rock 'n' Roll Philadelphia Half Marathon in 1:12:08.

Spence Gracey finished 8th in the 2016 TCS New York City Marathon in a time of 2:34:55.

She set her personal best in the marathon at the 2022 California International Marathon, held in Sacramento, with a time of 2:30:29 (191st place overall).

On June 30, 2023, Gracey attempted and broke the Guinness World Record in the Female Stroller Mile, running 5:24.18 while pushing her son at the Englewood High School track in Englewood, Colorado.

=== Coaching career ===
Spence Gracey has been assistant coach for middle school track and field at Peak to Peak Charter School in Lafayette, Colorado since 2025.

== International competitions ==
| Year | Competition | Venue | Position | Event | Notes |
|---|---|---|---|---|---|
| 2009 | World Cross Country Championships | Amman, Jordan | 19th | Junior race | 21:33 |
| 2009 | World Cross Country Championships | Amman, Jordan | 5th | Junior team | 124 pts |
| 2011 | Pan American Games | Guadalajara, Mexico | 8th | 5000 m | 17:01.11 |
| 2012 | International Chiba Ekiden | Chiba, Japan | 3rd | Team marathon | 23:30 (final leg) |
| 2013 | World Cross Country Championships | Bydgoszcz, Poland | 13th | Senior race | 25:08 |
| 2013 | World Cross Country Championships | Bydgoszcz, Poland | 4th | Senior team | 90 pts |

== Road race wins ==
- runDisney: Disney Princess Half Marathon 2023
- Rock 'n' Roll New Orleans Half Marathon: 2017
- Rock 'n' Roll Arizona Half Marathon: 2017
- Chicago RnR Half Marathon: 2016
- Rock 'n' Roll New Orleans Half Marathon: 2016
- Garry Bjorklund Half Marathon: 2015
- Fifth Third Bank Turkey Trot: 2013
