= 2009 IAAF World Cross Country Championships – Junior women's race =

Junior women's race at the 2009 IAAF World Cross Country Championships
- Organisers: IAAF
- Edition: 37th
- Date: March 28
- Host city: Amman, Jordan
- Venue: Al Bisharat Golf Course
- Events: 1
- Distances: 6 km – Junior women
- Participation: 99 athletes from 27 nations

The Junior women's race at the 2009 IAAF World Cross Country Championships was held at the Al Bisharat Golf Course in Amman, Jordan, on March 28, 2009. Reports of the event were given in The New York Times and for the IAAF.

Complete results for individuals, and for teams were published.

== Race results ==
=== Junior women's race (6 km) ===
==== Individual ====
| Rank | Athlete | Country | Time |
|---|---|---|---|
| 1st place, gold medalist(s) | Genzebe Dibaba | Ethiopia | 20:14 |
| 2nd place, silver medalist(s) | Mercy Cherono | Kenya | 20:17 |
| 3rd place, bronze medalist(s) | Jackline Chepngeno | Kenya | 20:27 |
| 4 | Frehiwat Goshu | Ethiopia | 20:34 |
| 5 | Nelly Chebet Ngeiywo | Kenya | 20:36 |
| 6 | Sule Utura | Ethiopia | 20:38 |
| 7 | Emebet Anteneh | Ethiopia | 20:42 |
| 8 | Hilda Chepkemoi Tanui | Kenya | 20:49 |
| 9 | Meseret Mengistu | Ethiopia | 20:52 |
| 10 | Jackline Chebii | Kenya | 21:01 |
| 11 | Emily Brichacek | Australia | 21:02 |
| 12 | Tsega Gelaw | Ethiopia | 21:11 |
| 13 | Lauren Howarth | United Kingdom | 21:14 |
| 14 | Charlotte Purdue | United Kingdom | 21:23 |
| 15 | Gladys Jerotich Kibiwot | Bahrain | 21:25 |
| 16 | Delvine Relin Meringor | Kenya | 21:27 |
| 17 | Nanaka Izawa | Japan | 21:27 |
| 18 | Erika Ikeda | Japan | 21:30 |
| 19 | Neely Spence | United States | 21:33 |
| 20 | Asami Kato | Japan | 21:33 |
| 21 | Aki Otagiri | Japan | 21:40 |
| 22 | Chitose Shibata | Japan | 21:47 |
| 23 | Tejitu Daba | Bahrain | 21:47 |
| 24 | Shitaye Eshete | Bahrain | 21:50 |
| 25 | Kate Avery | United Kingdom | 21:53 |
| 26 | Ashley Brasovan | United States | 21:55 |
| 27 | Nazret Weldu | Eritrea | 21:58 |
| 28 | Clémence Calvin | France | 22:01 |
| 29 | Tsige Gebrebrhan | Eritrea | 22:02 |
| 30 | Helen Hayelom | Eritrea | 22:07 |
| 31 | Lillian Partridge | United Kingdom | 22:10 |
| 32 | Chloe Tighe | Australia | 22:11 |
| 33 | Bai Baoqin | China | 22:11 |
| 34 | Louise Small | United Kingdom | 22:13 |
| 35 | Alexandra Dunne | United States | 22:15 |
| 36 | Nicki Maria McFadzien | New Zealand | 22:15 |
| 37 | Emi Kameyama | Japan | 22:15 |
| 38 | Elena Sedova | Russia | 22:17 |
| 39 | Maxine Heine-Wacker | South Africa | 22:24 |
| 40 | Francine Nibaruta | Burundi | 22:25 |
| 41 | Tatiana Prorokova | Russia | 22:26 |
| 42 | Chelsea Graham | Canada | 22:29 |
| 43 | Valeria Roffino | Italy | 22:30 |
| 44 | Emily Pritt | United States | 22:31 |
| 45 | Anna Catharina Gildenhuys | South Africa | 22:32 |
| 46 | Kedish Tesfay | Eritrea | 22:33 |
| 47 | Jana Van Wabeke | Belgium | 22:35 |
| 48 | Hollie Emery | Australia | 22:39 |
| 49 | Marina Petrova | Russia | 22:40 |
| 50 | Caroline Pfister | Canada | 22:42 |
| 51 | Narjes Issaoui | Tunisia | 22:44 |
| 52 | Tiegssti Negassi | Eritrea | 22:44 |
| 53 | Daniela Cunha | Portugal | 22:44 |
| 54 | Liudmila Lebedeva | Russia | 22:44 |
| 55 | Aleksandra Kudryashova | Russia | 22:47 |
| 56 | Jeanne D'arc Mukakigeli | Rwanda | 22:50 |
| 57 | Charo Inga | Peru | 22:52 |
| 58 | Adeline Musabyimana | Rwanda | 22:53 |
| 59 | Hadda Souadia | Algeria | 22:54 |
| 60 | Safa Jammeli | Tunisia | 22:55 |
| 61 | Embeitey Belay | Eritrea | 22:58 |
| 62 | Fatima-Zahra Ouhrisse | Morocco | 23:03 |
| 63 | Lucia Coli | Italy | 23:06 |
| 64 | Sandra Mosquera | Spain | 23:08 |
| 65 | Sara Vaughn | United States | 23:09 |
| 66 | Tamara Carvolth | Australia | 23:14 |
| 67 | Hafida Benjilali | Morocco | 23:16 |
| 68 | Nawal Yahi | Algeria | 23:19 |
| 69 | Habiba Hammam | Morocco | 23:22 |
| 70 | Fatima Ouezzani | Morocco | 23:23 |
| 71 | Stephanie Aldea | Canada | 23:25 |
| 72 | Nabila Sifi | Algeria | 23:27 |
| 73 | Nandipha Dywili | South Africa | 23:37 |
| 74 | Estefanía Tobal | Spain | 23:39 |
| 75 | Tamara Jewett | Canada | 23:42 |
| 76 | Laura Park | United Kingdom | 23:45 |
| 77 | Ashleigh Schnettler | South Africa | 23:49 |
| 78 | Yamna Ambarki | Morocco | 23:53 |
| 79 | Hayat Amri | Morocco | 23:57 |
| 80 | Letitia Saayman | South Africa | 24:09 |
| 81 | Bénisse Inamahoro | Burundi | 24:10 |
| 82 | Elena Gerasimova | Russia | 24:17 |
| 83 | Tania Carretero | Spain | 24:20 |
| 84 | Zinhle Sinqe | South Africa | 24:27 |
| 85 | Ala'ziad Khalifah | Jordan | 24:32 |
| 86 | Marwa Nasri | Tunisia | 24:58 |
| 87 | Nabila Chaib Draa | Algeria | 25:00 |
| 88 | Hassiba Bioudi | Algeria | 25:10 |
| 89 | Naïma Bakaddour | Algeria | 25:19 |
| 90 | Amira Saghraoui | Tunisia | 25:28 |
| 91 | Katarzyna Broniatowska | Poland | 25:53 |
| 92 | Rasha Ayoub | Jordan | 26:13 |
| 93 | Ghurour Aldeghemat | Jordan | 26:20 |
| 94 | Nahida Albawwat | Jordan | 27:02 |
| 95 | Naama Barka | Libya | 28:48 |
| — | Geneviève Lalonde | Canada | DNF |
| — | Faten Nemrawy | Jordan | DNF |
| — | Esra'a Ikhlawi | Jordan | DNF |
| — | Justine Johnson | Canada | DNF |

==== Teams ====
| Rank | Team | Points |
|---|---|---|
| 1st place, gold medalist(s) | Ethiopia: Genzebe Dibaba / 1; Frehiwat Goshu / 4; Sule Utura / 6; Emebet Anteneh / 7; (Meseret Mengistu) / (9); (Tsega Gelaw) / (12) | 18 |
| 2nd place, silver medalist(s) | Kenya: Mercy Cherono / 2; Jackline Chepngeno / 3; Nelly Chebet Ngeiywo / 5; Hilda Chepkemoi Tanui / 8; (Jackline Chebii) / (10); (Delvine Relin Meringor) / (16) | 18 |
| 3rd place, bronze medalist(s) | Japan: Nanaka Izawa / 17; Erika Ikeda / 18; Asami Kato / 20; Aki Otagiri / 21; (Chitose Shibata) / (22); (Emi Kameyama) / (37) | 76 |
| 4 | United Kingdom: Lauren Howarth / 13; Charlotte Purdue / 14; Kate Avery / 25; Lillian Partridge / 31; (Louise Small) / (34); (Laura Park) / (76) | 83 |
| 5 | United States: Neely Spence / 19; Ashley Brasovan / 26; Alexandra Dunne / 35; Emily Pritt / 44; (Sara Vaughn) / (65) | 124 |
| 6 | Eritrea: Nazret Weldu / 27; Tsige Gebrebrhan / 29; Helen Hayelom / 30; Kedish Tesfay / 46; (Tiegssti Negassi) / (52); (Embeitey Belay) / (61) | 132 |
| 7 | Australia: Emily Brichacek / 11; Chloe Tighe / 32; Hollie Emery / 48; Tamara Carvolth / 66 | 157 |
| 8 | Russia: Elena Sedova / 38; Tatiana Prorokova / 41; Marina Petrova / 49; Liudmila Lebedeva / 54; (Aleksandra Kudryashova) / (55); (Elena Gerasimova) / (82) | 182 |
| 9 | South Africa: Maxine Heine-Wacker / 39; Anna Catharina Gildenhuys / 45; Nandipha Dywili / 73; Ashleigh Schnettler / 77; (Letitia Saayman) / (80); (Zinhle Sinqe) / (84) | 234 |
| 10 | Canada: Chelsea Graham / 42; Caroline Pfister / 50; Stephanie Aldea / 71; Tamara Jewett / 75; (Geneviève Lalonde) / (DNF); (Justine Johnson) / (DNF) | 238 |
| 11 | Morocco: Fatima-Zahra Ouhrisse / 62; Hafida Benjilali / 67; Habiba Hammam / 69; Fatima Ouezzani / 70; (Yamna Ambarki) / (78); (Hayat Amri) / (79) | 268 |
| 12 | Algeria: Hadda Souadia / 59; Nawal Yahi / 68; Nabila Sifi / 72; Nabila Chaib Draa / 87; (Hassiba Bioudi) / (88); (Naïma Bakaddour) / (89) | 286 |
| 13 | Tunisia: Narjes Issaoui / 51; Safa Jammeli / 60; Marwa Nasri / 86; Amira Saghraoui / 90 | 287 |
| 14 | Jordan: Ala'ziad Khalifah / 85; Rasha Ayoub / 92; Ghurour Aldeghemat / 93; Nahida Albawwat / 94; (Esra'a Ikhlawi) / (DNF); (Faten Nemrawy) / (DNF) | 364 |

- Note: Athletes in parentheses did not score for the team result.

== Participation ==
According to an unofficial count, 99 athletes from 27 countries participated in the Junior women's race. This is in agreement with the official numbers as published.

- Algeria (6)
- Australia (4)
- Bahrain (3)
- Belgium (1)
- Burundi (2)
- Canada (6)
- China (1)
- Eritrea (6)
- Ethiopia (6)
- France (1)
- Italy (2)
- Japan (6)
- Jordan (6)
- Kenya (6)
- Libya (1)
- Morocco (6)
- New Zealand (1)
- Peru (1)
- Poland (1)
- Portugal (1)
- Russia (6)
- Rwanda (2)
- South Africa (6)
- Spain (3)
- Tunisia (4)
- United Kingdom (6)
- United States (5)

== See also ==
- 2009 IAAF World Cross Country Championships – Senior men's race
- 2009 IAAF World Cross Country Championships – Junior men's race
- 2009 IAAF World Cross Country Championships – Senior women's race
