= Kate Avery =

British long-distance runner

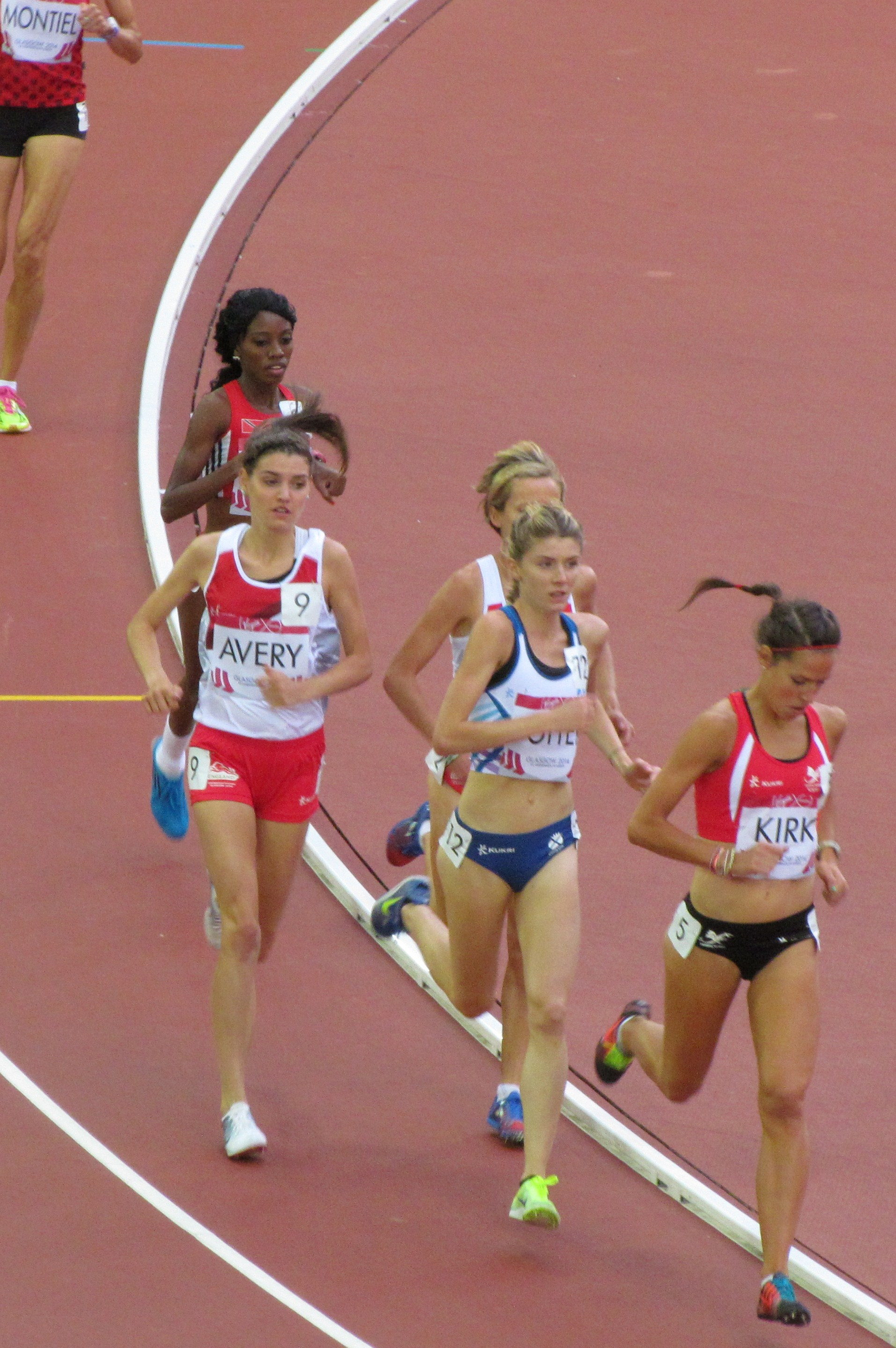
- Avery (left) in the 10,000 m at the 2014 Commonwealth Games

Personal information
- Nationality: British; English
- Born: 10 October 1991 (age 35) Newton Aycliffe, England
- Height: 5 ft 9 in (1.75 m)

Sport
- Sport: Track, long-distance running
- Events: 1500 metres, mile, 5000 metres, 10,000 meters
- College team: Iona

Achievements and titles
- Personal bests: 1500 metres: 4:15.97; 5000 metres: 15:25.63; 10,000 metres: 31:41.44
Medal record
Representing United Kingdom
European Cross Country Championships
Gold medal – first place	2015 Hyéres	Senior team
Gold medal – first place	2014 Samokov	Senior team
Gold medal – first place	2013 Belgrade	U23 team
Silver medal – second place	2015 Hyéres	Senior race
Silver medal – second place	2014 Samokov	Senior race
Silver medal – second place	2009 Dublin	Junior team
Bronze medal – third place	2009 Dublin	Junior race
- Updated on 3–10–15

Kate Avery (born 10 October 1991) is a British long-distance runner. She competes in track and road competitions but specialises in cross country running. She was twice silver medallist at the 2014 European Cross Country Championships and 2015, and also a gold medallist on both occasions as part of the Great Britain women's senior team. She became the first British woman to win the NCAA Women's Division I Cross Country Championship in 2014, running for Iona College.

She was among Europe's top developing runners as a junior, claiming medals at the European Athletics Junior Championships and European Cross Country Championships in 2009. She moved up the age categories and was a medallist at the 2013 European Athletics U23 Championships, as well as a team champion in European cross country.

== Career ==
=== Early life and career ===
Avery was born in Bishop Auckland. Raised in Newton Aycliffe, County Durham, she began taking part in running competitions as a youth, representing her local club, Shildon Running & AC. In 2005, she placed fifth in the 1500 metres at the English Schools Championships. While a student at Woodham Community Technology College, she won the national cross country running title for her age group in 2006. The following year she was runner-up at the English schools cross country and also placed second in the 1500 m at the UK School Games and the English Schools Championships.

She began to make her first impact in the junior category in 2009. She was runner-up at the English junior cross country, won the junior section of the Cross Juan Muguerza in Spain and was the sixth placed junior at the prominent Cinque Mulini in Italy. These performances gained her a debut international appearance at the 2009 IAAF World Cross Country Championships. In the junior race she came 25th – the third best European behind teammates Lauren Howarth and Charlotte Purdue, which helped the British team to fourth place. Third place at the 3000 metres national junior trials brought her selection for the 2009 European Athletics Junior Championships, where she went on to claim the silver medal, being overtaken by winner Yelena Korobkina in the final straight. Further international medals followed at the 2009 European Cross Country Championships as she took the bronze and led the British junior women to second in the team rankings.

Avery had three international outings the year after. At the 2010 IAAF World Cross Country Championships she improved from her previous attempt and finished twentieth (second best European behind Gulshat Fazlitdinova). At the 2010 World Junior Championships in Athletics she stepped up to the 5000 metres distance and placed eleventh overall. A return to the continental scene at the 2010 European Cross Country Championships saw her finish lower down the order in twelfth place. Her 2011 season was quiet in comparison: she failed to finish at the European 5000 m trials and did not compete internationally.

=== Under-23 and NCAA debut ===
Avery won her first senior national title in 2014, winning over 1500 m at the English Athletics Championships. She also paced sixth in the 5000 m at the British Athletics Championships, having improved her best to 15:35.12 minutes earlier that season. She began to progress in the under-23 category the following year, starting with a win in the 10,000 metres at the Penn Relays. She won the 5000 m at the under-23 trials before going on to take the bronze medal in that event at the 2013 European Athletics U23 Championships, which was later upgraded to silver. She enrolled at Iona College in the United States towards the end of the year and began competing for their Iona Gaels collegiate team. Her first collegiate honours quickly followed at the 2013 NCAA Division I Cross Country Championships, where she paced third. A month later she shared in the under-23 team title with Great Britain at the 2013 European Cross Country Championships, having finished fourth behind teammate Charlotte Purdue.

She established herself among the top American collegiate runners in 2014. She competed a mile run/3000 m double at the Metro Atlantic Athletic Conference (MAAC) indoor Championships and came ninth in the latter event at the 2014 NCAA Division I Indoor Track and Field Championships. She was eighth in the 5000 m at the 2014 NCAA Division I Outdoor Track and Field Championships and went on to claim one title in cross country soon after, winning the MAAC event then pacing first at the 2014 NCAA Division I Cross Country Championships. In the NCAA race she led from start to finish with a winning margin of over eight seconds. Her win was a first for a British woman and an Iona Gaels athlete, being the institution's third ever NCAA individual title. She placed fourth 2015 NCAA Division I Outdoor Track and Field Championships in 5000 metres.

In 2015, while at Iona, Avery won the Honda Sports Award as the nation's best female collegiate cross country runner.

=== Senior career ===
Avery also ran internationally that year. She came ninth in the 3000 m at the 2014 European Team Championships then made her debut for England at the 2014 Commonwealth Games, running a personal best of 32:33.35 minutes to come fourth in the 10,000 m (beaten only by Kenyan opposition). Her third and final international outing that year was her most successful. At the 2014 European Cross Country Championships she ran in the senior race for the first time. Aiming for a top ten placing, she ran hard from the front and was rewarded with a silver medal after losing a close finish to teammate Gemma Steel. The two shared in the women's senior team title. As the top-ranked British indoor runner over 3000 m, she was initially invited by British Athletics to compete at the 2014 IAAF World Indoor Championships at the start of the year. However, the governing body then told her she was ineligible, not having obtained permission to miss the trials event. The body was criticised for giving the athlete confusing information.

In 2019, she competed in the senior women's race at the 2019 IAAF World Cross Country Championships held in Aarhus, Denmark. She finished in 30th place.

== National titles ==
- English Athletics Championships
  - 1500 metres: 2012

== International competitions ==
Year	Competition	Venue	Position	Event	Notes
2009	World Cross Country Championships	Amman, Jordan	25th	Junior women's race (6 km)	21:53
2009	European Junior Championships	Novi Sad, Serbia	2nd	3000 m	9:13.68
2009	European Cross Country Championships	Dublin, Ireland	3rd	Junior women's race (4.039 km)	14:27
2009	European Cross Country Championships	Dublin, Ireland	2nd	Junior women's team	51 pts
2010	World Cross Country Championships	Bydgoszcz, Poland	20th	Junior women's race (5.833 km)	20:17
2010	World Junior Championships	Moncton, Canada	11th	5000 metres	16:23.97
2010	European Cross Country Championships	Albufeira, Portugal	12th	Junior women's race (3.97 km)	13:24
2013	European U23 Championships	Tampere, Finland	2nd	5000 m	15:54.07
2013	European Cross Country Championships	Belgrade, Serbia	4th	Under-23 women's race (6.025 km)	19:56
2013	European Cross Country Championships	Belgrade, Serbia	1st	Under-23 women's team	19 pts
2014	European Team Championships	Braunschweig, Germany	9th	3000 m	8:56.24
2014	Commonwealth Games	Glasgow, Scotland	4th	10,000 metres	32:33.35 PB
2014	European Cross Country Championships	Samokov, Bulgaria	2nd	Senior women's race (8.05 km)	28:27
2014	European Cross Country Championships	Samokov, Bulgaria	1st	Senior women's team	21 pts
2015	World Championships	Beijing, China	15th	10,000 m	32:16.19
2015	European Cross Country Championships	Hyéres, France	2nd	Senior women's race (8.05 km)	25:35
2015	European Cross Country Championships	Hyéres, France	1st	Senior women's team	33 pts
2016	Great Edinburgh International Cross Country	Edinburgh, Scotland	1st	6000 m	21:05
2018	European Cup (athletics)	London, England	20th	10,000 m	33:05.24
