= Emily Pritt =

American long-distance runner

Emily Pritt is an American long-distance runner.

== High school career ==
She was a multiple-time district champion at Jackson High School in Stark County, Ohio.

== College career ==
For the NC State Wolfpack she was a cross-country All-American.

== International career ==
She competed in the 2009 IAAF World Cross Country Championships in the Junior women's race where she finished 44th.

Pritt also competed at the 2017 IAAF World Cross Country Championships.
