= Martin Lel =

Kenyan long-distance runner

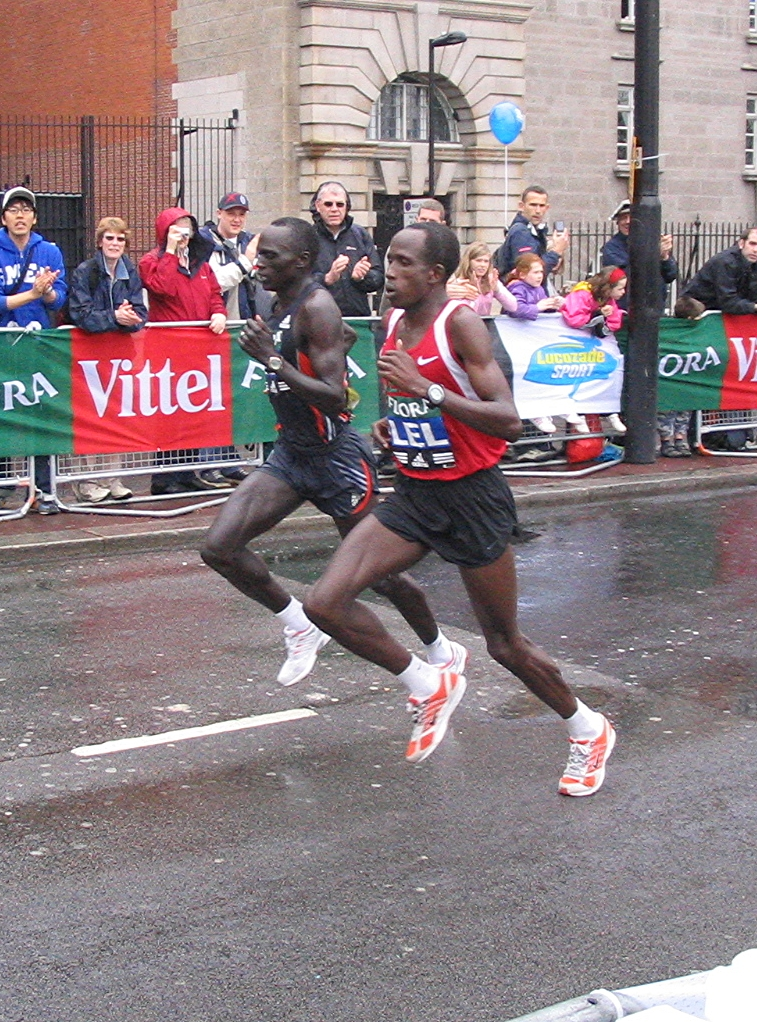
- Martin Lel (right) at the 2006 London Marathon

Personal information
- Nationality: Kenya
- Born: 29 October 1978 (age 47) Kapsabet, Kenya
- Height: 5 ft 7 in (1.70 m)
- Weight: 54 kg (119 lb)

Martin Kiptolo Lel (born 29 October 1978) is a Kenyan professional long distance and marathon runner. He won the London Marathon in 2005, 2007, and 2008, the New York City Marathon in 2003 and 2007 and the Great North Run in 2007 and 2009. His personal best time, as of April 2008, is 2:05:15, which he ran in the 2008 London Marathon setting a course record. Lel is coached by Claudio Berardelli and lives in the Rift Valley region of Kenya.

Lel ran his first marathons in 2002: he failed to finish at the Prague Marathon, but in his first finish he managed to claim second in the Venice Marathon. He won Lisbon Half Marathon in 2003, 2006 and 2009, was the gold medalist at the 2003 IAAF World Half Marathon Championships, and won the Portugal Half Marathon in 2005. He made his Olympic debut for Kenya at the 2008 Beijing Olympics and came fifth in the marathon.

He beat Samuel Wanjiru to win the inaugural edition of the Rock ‘n’ Roll Mardi Gras Marathon in 2010. In August 2010, he ran at the Falmouth Road Race and took third place. After almost 3 years without running a marathon, he participated in the 2011 London Marathon as a replacement for Samuel Wanjiru, who was originally invited to run, but he still placed second with a time of 2:05:45, out-sprinting Patrick Makau at the finish line. He ran the 15K Saint Silvester Road Race at the end of the year, but was beaten into fourth place. Lel entered two races the year after: he was runner-up again at the 2012 London Marathon (finishing in 2:06:51) and was victorious at the Portugal Half Marathon with a time of 61:28 minutes.

In 2011, the American Charity, Shoe4Africa, funded and opened the Shoe4Africa Martin Lel school in Lel's home village, Kimn'geru, to honor the athlete.

His brother, Cyprian Kimurgor Kotut, followed in his footsteps as a marathon runner and won the 2016 Paris Marathon.

== Competition record ==
=== International competitions ===
Year	Competition	Venue	Position	Notes
2003	World Half Marathon Championships	New York, New York, U.S.	1st	Half marathon
2008	Olympic Games	Beijing, China	5th	Marathon

=== Road races ===
Year	Competition	Venue	Position	Notes
2003	Boston Marathon	Boston, Massachusetts, U.S.	3rd	Marathon
2003	New York City Marathon	New York, New York, U.S.	1st	Marathon
2003	Lisbon Half Marathon	Lisbon, Portugal	1st	Half marathon
2003	Virginia Beach Half Marathon	Virginia Beach, Virginia, U.S.	1st	Half marathon
2004	Peachtree Road Race	Atlanta, Georgia, U.S.	1st	10 km
2004	Boston Marathon	Boston, Massachusetts, U.S.	3rd	Marathon
2005	London Marathon	London, England	1st	Marathon
2006	Peachtree Road Race	Atlanta, Georgia, U.S.	1st	10 km
2006	London Marathon	London, England	2nd	Marathon
2007	London Marathon	London, England	1st	Marathon
2007	Great North Run	Newcastle upon Tyne, England	1st	Half marathon
2007	New York City Marathon	New York, New York, U.S.	1st	Marathon
2008	London Marathon	London, England	1st	Marathon
2009	Great North Run	Newcastle upon Tyne, England	1st	Half marathon
2010	Mardi Gras Half Marathon	New Orleans, Louisiana, U.S.	1st	Half marathon
2010	Falmouth Road Race	Falmouth, Massachusetts, U.S.	3rd	7.1 miles
2011	London Marathon	London, England	2nd	Marathon
2012	London Marathon	London, England	2nd	Marathon
