= John Kipkoech =

Kenyan long-distance runner (born 1991)

Medal record

Men's athletics

Representing Kenya

World Junior Championships
Silver medal – second place	2010 Moncton	5000 m

John Chepkwony Kipkoech (born 29 December 1991) is a Kenyan professional long-distance runner who competes in the 5000 metres. He represented Kenya in the event at the 2013 World Championships in Athletics. He was a silver medallist at the 2010 World Junior Championships in Athletics and a junior team gold medallist at the 2009 IAAF World Cross Country Championships. His personal best of 12:49.50 minutes ranks him in the top twenty all-time runners for the 5000 m.

== Career ==
He made his international debut in the junior race at the 2009 IAAF World Cross Country Championships, where his ninth-place finish helped Kenya to the team gold medals. He made his international track debut the following year, and was the silver medallist in the 5000 metres behind compatriot David Kiprotich Bett. He competed on the European circuit in August and was fourth in the 3000 metres at the ISTAF Berlin and Rieti Meeting. His time of 7:32.72 minutes in Rieti ranked him eighth in the world in the event that year. Given these performances he was recruited for the Kenyan Armed Forces sports team. In his first senior race in Kenya, he won the Kipkelion leg of the Athletics Kenya cross country series. In the cross country season he came third at the Cross Internacional de Venta de Baños, then placed 19th in the senior race at the 2011 Kenyan Cross Country Championships. He opened his track season at the Doha Diamond League meet, running 7:34.82 minutes for the 3000 m, but missed the rest of the season.

Kipkoech returned in the 2012 season and after a ninth-place finish at the Kenyan Cross Country, he won the Trofeo Alsport race in Sardinia. An outing over 5 km brought him fifth place at the Carlsbad 5000 in the United States. His first race on the 2012 IAAF Diamond League circuit came at the Shanghai Golden Grand Prix, where he placed third with a 5000 metres best of 13:12.66 minutes (beating Kenenisa Bekele among others). He was sixth at the Prefontaine Classic and had the same placing at the Meeting Areva – his time of 12:49.50 minutes at the latter race ranked him sixth in the world that year. A 3000 m run of 7:34.03 minutes brought him third at the DN Galan and seventh on the yearly rankings for that distance. His last Diamond League outing was a fifth-place finish at the Weltklasse Zürich. Turning back to cross country, he was third at the Cross Internacional de Soria in November, and runner-up to Muktar Edris at February's Campaccio.

At the start of 2013 he made more road running appearances, setting a best of 29:19 minutes for the 10K run at the World's Best 10K race and taking second to Dejen Gebremeskel at the Carlsbad 5000. After a season's best run of 13:01.64 minutes at the Golden Gala 5000 m, he gained wild-card selection for the 2013 World Championships in Athletics as a result of a fifth-place finish at the national championships. His performance at the World Championships 5000 m was poor, as he fell over in the heats and narrowly missed the qualifying time for the next stage.

Kipkoech opened 2014 with two personal bests: he 29:04 minutes for fifth at the World's Best 10K and 61:38 minutes for sixth at the Berlin Half Marathon. He was fourth and sixth at the Shanghai and Eugene legs of the 2014 IAAF Diamond League, but was out of the top eight in the 5000 m at the national championships.

== Personal bests ==
- 3000 metres – 7:32.72 min (2010)
- 5000 metres – 12:49.50 min (2012)
- 10,000 metres – 29:14.8 min (2013)
- 5K run – 13:24 min (2012)
- 10K run – 29:04 min (2014)
- Half marathon – 61:38 min (2014)

== International competition record ==
Year	Competition	Venue	Position	Event	Notes
2009	IAAF World Cross Country Championships	Amman, Jordan	9th	Junior race	24:00 min
2009	IAAF World Cross Country Championships	Amman, Jordan	1st	Team race	
2010	World Junior Championships	Moncton, Canada	2nd	5000 m	13:26.03
2013	World Championships	Moscow, Russia	10th (heats)	5000 m	13:31.21
