= Ryan Hill =

American long-distance runner

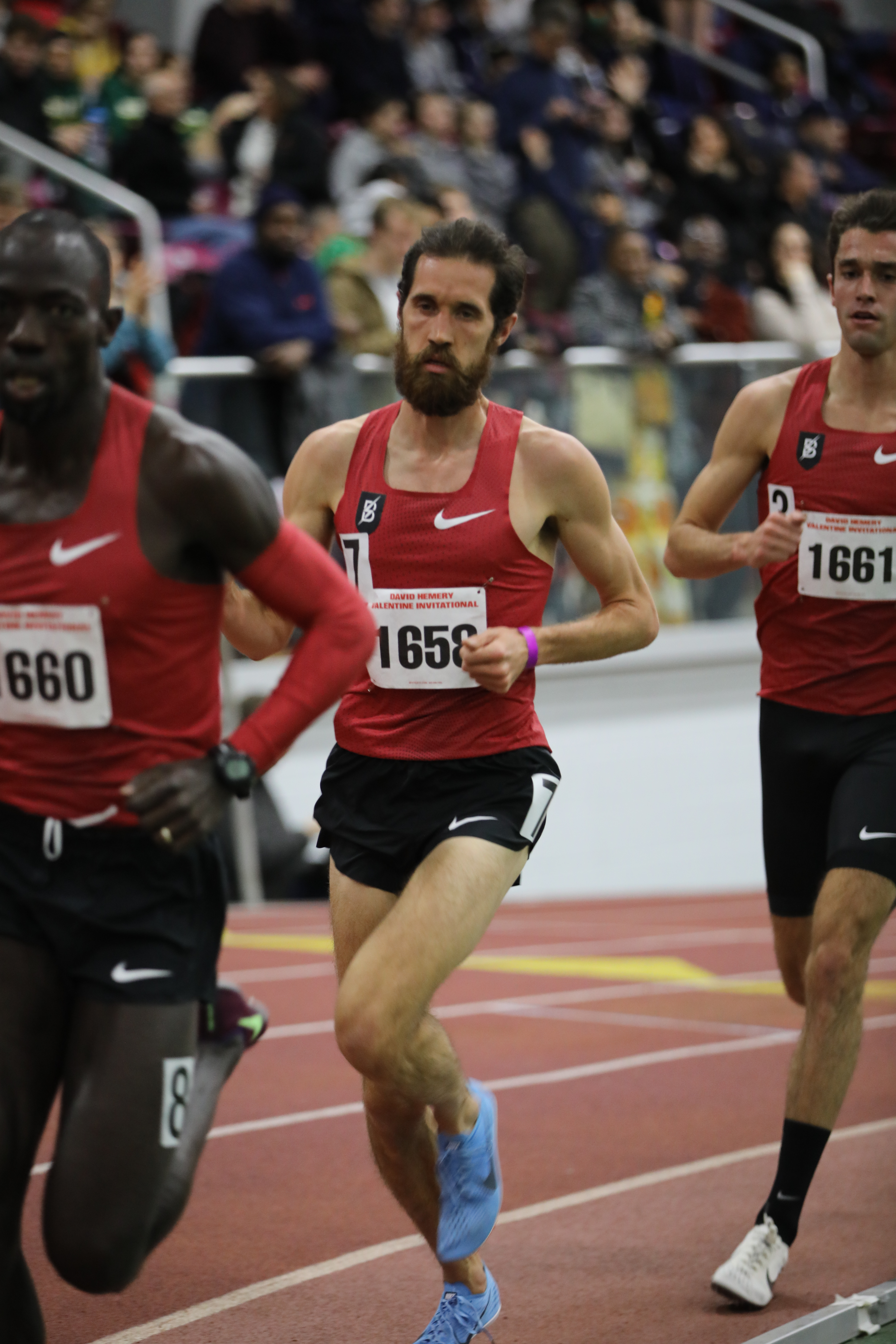
- Hill competing in 2019 at Boston University

Personal information
- Nationality: American
- Born: January 31, 1990 (age 36) Hickory, North Carolina, U.S.
- Height: 5 ft 11.05 in (1.80 m)
- Weight: 135 lb (61 kg)

Sport
- Sport: Track, long-distance running
- Events: 1500 meters, mile, 3000 meters, 2-mile, 5000 meters, 10,000 meters
- College team: NC State

Achievements and titles
- Personal bests: 1500m: 3:35.59; 3000m: 7:30.93; 5000m: 13:05.69
Medal record
World Indoor Championships
Silver medal – second place	2016 Portland	3000 m
USA Outdoor Championships
Gold medal – first place	2015 Eugene	5000 m
Silver medal – second place	2018 Des Moines	5000 m
Bronze medal – third place	2013 Des Moines	5000 m
Bronze medal – third place	2017 Sacramento	5000 m

Ryan Hill (born January 31, 1990) is an American long-distance runner. Hill was a silver medalist in the 3000 metres at the 2016 IAAF World Indoor Championships. He represented the United States at the 2009 IAAF World Cross Country Championships – Junior men's race 52nd place, 2013 World Championships in Athletics and the 2015 World Championships in Athletics, where he ran the 5000 meters at both finishing 7th and 5th, respectively.

Hill competed for North Carolina State University and was sponsored by Nike immediately after college, where he was coached by Jerry Schumacher in the Bowerman Track Club. He was a Nike athlete from 2013-2020. In 2021, Hill signed with Hoke One One and NAZ Elite to train in Flagstaff, AZ.

== Running career ==
=== High school ===
Hill attended Hickory High School in Hickory, North Carolina, where he emerged as one of the top high school distance runners in North Carolina, graduating in 2008. While competing in high school cross country and track, Hill became a multiple-time North Carolina state champion.

=== Collegiate ===
Hill attended North Carolina State University, where he also competed in cross country and track. He was coached by Rollie Geiger while at NC State. He accumulated ten All-American honors. At the 2012 NCAA DI Outdoor T&F Championships, he placed third in the men's 1500 meter finals. As a freshman at NC State, Hill placed on the podium at 2009 USA Cross Country Championships at Agricultural History Farm Park in Derwood, Maryland and qualified to Team USA for 2009 World Cross Country Championships where he finished in 52nd place in 26:04.

=== Professional ===
After completing his collegiate career in May 2013, Hill went on to finish third in the 5000 meters at the 2013 USA Outdoor Track and Field Championships to qualify for his first World team. Hill continued his immediate post-collegiate success by finishing 10th in world in the 5000 meters at the 2013 World Championships in Athletics. Hill signed a professional contract to represent Nike, and run for the Bowerman Track Club under coach Jerry Schumacher .

The following year, Hill finished 3rd in the 3000 meters at the 2014 USA Indoor Track and Field Championships, missing a spot at the world championships by one place. In 2015, Hill won the two mile race at the 2015 USA Indoor Track and Field Championships. Hill won 2015 USA Outdoor Track and Field Championships in 13:50.69, qualifying for his second World Championship team. Hill placed 7th, his second top 10 world finish 2015 World. September 11, Hill ran 13:05 at Diamond League finale in Brussels.

On February 20, 2016, Hill won the Millrose Games men's 3000m in 7:38.82. On March 11, 2016, Hill won the 3000m race at the 2016 USA Indoor Track and Field Championships. With a time of 7:38.60, edging out Paul Chelimo by .40 seconds (7:39.00) with his patented kick, Hill not only captured his third USA title but also qualified for the 2016 World Indoor Track and Field Championships in Portland, Oregon.

At the 2016 IAAF World Indoor Championships, the race began slow and tactical, and Hill settled into the second position. As the pace quickened, he eventually fell back, and was in 5th place with one lap remaining. Passing one runner on the backstretch, Hill found another gear, and passed two others in the last 100 meters to take 2nd place and the silver medal in a time of 7:57.39, finishing just barely behind 19-year-old Yomif Kejelcha of Ethiopia (7:57.21). Ryan Hill improved his PR to 7:30.93 at the Diamond League meeting in Paris on Saturday, August 27, 2016, finishing 4th. Only three Americans in history have run faster: Bernard Lagat, Galen Rupp (indoors), and Bob Kennedy. Hill finished in first place at USATF 5 km Championships hosted by CVS Health Downtown 5k in Providence, Rhode Island in a time of 13:57.

On June 23, 2017, Hill finished in the top three at US Championships to qualify for his third World Championship team. At the 2017 World Championships in Athletics in London, Hill easily qualified to the Final running the fifth fastest time of the day (13:22.79). Disaster struck two days later when Hill fell victim to the norovirus outbreak affecting athletes at the championships and was forced by USATF to withdraw from the final.

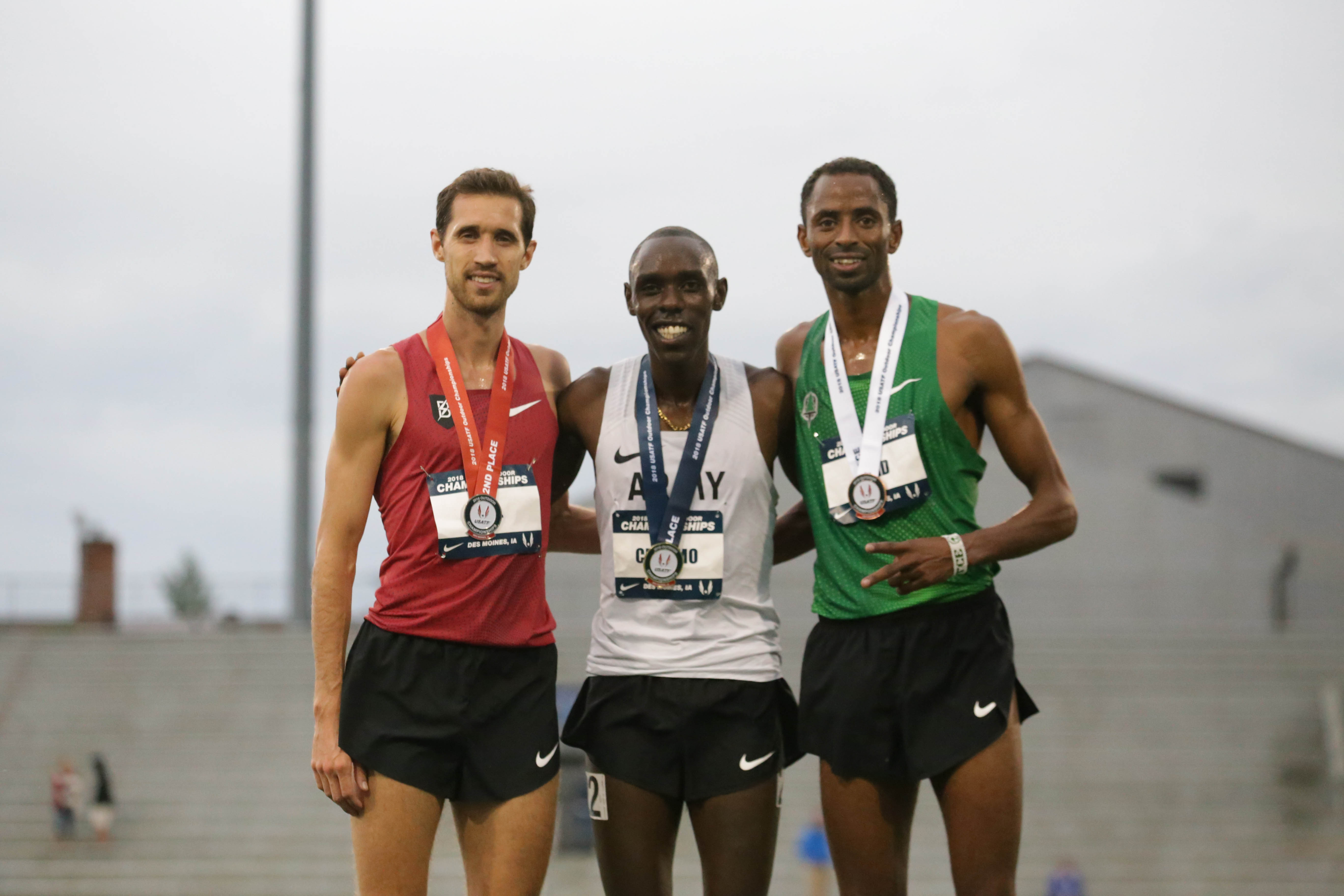
Hill (left) after the 5000m at the 2018 USATF Outdoor National Championships

In 2018, Hill finished second in the 5000 meters at the 2018 USA Outdoor Track and Field Championships in 13:29.67, narrowly losing to Paul Chelimo by .20 seconds (13:29.47).
