= Chris Derrick =

American distance runner (born 1990)

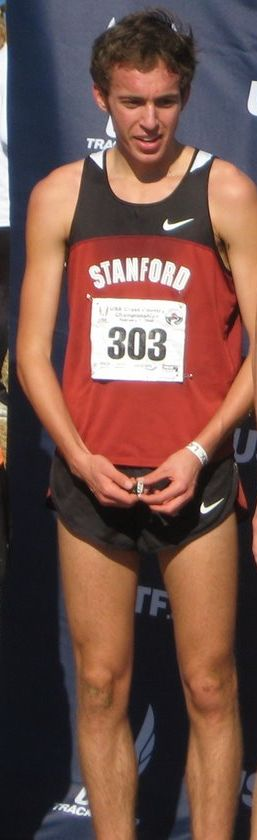
- Derrick at the 2009 U.S. Junior Cross Country Championships

Personal information
- Born: October 17, 1990 (age 35) Albany, New York, U.S.
- Height: 6 ft 2 in (1.88 m)
- Weight: 161 lb (73 kg)

Sport
- Country: United States
- Events: 5000m, 10,000m, Cross Country
- College team: Stanford University
- Coached by: Jerry Schumacher
Medal record
Men's athletics
Representing United States
World Cross Country Championships
Silver medal – second place	2013 Bydgoszcz	Team

Chris Derrick (born October 17, 1990) is an American distance runner who won 3 consecutive US Cross Country Championships in 2013–15. He attended Stanford University, where he earned 14 All-American honors and holds an American junior record in the 5000 meters.

== High school ==
As a member of the high school class of 2008, Derrick has traded victories with former American high school record holder in the two-mile, German Fernandez. As a high school senior at Neuqua Valley High School in Naperville, Illinois, Derrick gained recognition when he won the 2007 Illinois state cross country championship and set the course record on the altered Detweiller Park course in 13:52, behind the 13:50.6 that Craig Virgin (the only American to ever win at the IAAF World Cross Country Championships) ran on the original course. Derrick concluded his senior cross country season by capturing both a team and individual victory at the Nike Cross Nationals competition, followed a week later by a second-place finish at the Foot Locker Cross Country Championships. During track season, at the Arcadia Invitational Derrick ran a 13:55 in the 5000m, the fastest time run by an American high school student in a high school-only race. Derrick received the inaugural Gatorade National Boys Cross Country Runner of the Year award in partnership with ESPN RISE Magazine following his 2007 season.

== College ==
Derrick attended Stanford University and earned 14 All-American honors (Four in cross country, five in indoor track and field, and five in outdoor track and field)

Academic Year	Fall Season	Winter Season	Spring Season
Freshman	10 km cross country	3 km indoor, 5 km indoor	5 km outdoor
Sophomore	10 km cross country	-	5 km outdoor,
Junior	10 km cross country	5 km indoor	5 km outdoor, 10 km outdoor
Senior	10 km cross country	3 km indoor, 5 km indoor	10 km outdoor

On March 28, 2009, Derrick placed 15th in the Junior race at the 37th IAAF World Cross Country Championships in Amman, Jordan.

On May 2, 2009, Derrick set the American Junior 5000m record with a time of 13:29.98, breaking Olympian Galen Rupp's previous record of 13:37.91, run in 2004.

On June 12, 2009, Derrick placed 3rd at the NCAA Outdoor Track and Field Championships in the 5000 Meter Run.

On November 23, 2009, Derrick placed 3rd at the NCAA Cross Country Championship

On June 11, 2010, Derrick placed 4th at the NCAA Outdoor Track and Field Championships in the 5000 Meter Run.

On November 21, 2011, Derrick finished in 2nd place behind Lawi Lalang of Arizona in his final cross country race for Stanford at the DI NCAA Cross Country Championship.

On March 9–10, 2012, Derrick finished in 2nd place behind Lawi Lalang of Arizona in both the 3000m and 5000m runs at the NCAA DI Indoor Track & Field National Meet.

On April 30, 2012, Derrick finished in 3rd place in the 10,000m and set an American Collegian record at the Payton Jordan Invite in 27 minutes, 31.38 seconds.

On June 22, 2012, Derrick finished 4th in the 10k Olympic Trials, beaten by Galen Rupp, Matt Tegenkamp, and Dathan Ritzenhein.

== Nike Oregon Track Club ==
In February 2013, Derrick won the US Senior Men 12,000 meters USA Cross Country Championships in 35:38 at Forest Park in St. Louis Missouri, to qualify for the 2013 IAAF World Cross Country Championships where he placed 10th.

Derrick later finished 3rd in the 10,000 meters 2013 USA Outdoor Track and Field Championships in June 2013 to qualify for the 2013 World Championships in Athletics in August. Derrick finished 18th in the 2013 World Championships in Athletics – Men's 10,000 metres 10,000 meters in a season best time of 28:04.54.

== Bowerman Track Club ==
In January 2014 & 2015, Derrick repeated as victor of the Great Edinburgh International Cross Country Senior race.

In February 2014, Derrick repeated as victor of the US Senior Men 12,000 meters USA Cross Country Championships in 36:14, in Boulder, Colorado. In March, Derrick finished 2nd place and set an Age Record at the Jacksonville Gate River Run 15k road race (43:16).

Derrick ran 13:08.18 at 2014 Payton Jordan Invitational.

Derrick later finished 2nd in the 10,000 meters (28:18.18) 2014 USA Outdoor Track and Field Championships on June 26, 2014.

In February 2015, Derrick won his third consecutive US Senior Men 12,000 meters USA Cross Country Championships in 36:18, in Boulder, Colorado, to qualify for the 2015 IAAF World Cross Country Championships in Guiyang, China, where he placed 24th.

March 1, Derrick ran a personal best 8:32.51 in the Men's 2 Mile – 2015 USA Indoor Track and Field Championships at Reggie Lewis Track and Athletic Center.

March 28, 2015, where Derrick placed 24th in 2015 IAAF World Cross Country Championships – Senior men's race.

Derrick ran 28:31.75 to finish 7th at the 2015 USA Outdoor Track and Field Championships.

July 18, Derrick ran 2016 Olympic qualifying time 13:19.56 in Heusden-Zolder.

July 24, Derrick ran a 7:43.77 3000 meters in London 2015 Diamond League Meeting. The time is less than 4 seconds from 2016 Portland World Championships entry standard.

August 17, Derrick finished 8th at Falmouth Road in 33:41.

September 11, Derrick ran 13:25 at Diamond League final in Brussels.

February 13, 2016, Derrick qualified to compete at 2016 US Olympic Marathon Trials at Jacksonville Bank Marathon 2016 on January 3, 2016, with a time 1:03:41.

Derrick ran 13:40.91 at 2016 Payton Jordan Invitational.

Derrick placed 23rd 14:01 at 5000 meters and 5th 28:47.24 at 10,000 meters at the 2016 United States Olympic Trials (track and field).

Derrick ran 18:27.70 for Team San Francisco at 2016 Track Town Summer Series 4-mile race to finish second to Sam Chelanga who ran 18:23.60 for Team NY. Derrick's contribution helped San Francisco win the team title.

November 26, 2016, Derrick ran 27:38 for 10,000 metres at 2016 Hachioji Long Distance Invitational in Tokyo.

In February 2017, Derrick earned an IAAF World Cross Country Championships Team USA spot after placing 5th at US Senior Men 10,000 meters USA Cross Country Championships in 30:28. in Bend, Oregon, but opted not to compete.

In May 2017 Derrick served as a pacer for Nike's Breaking2 attempt at achieving a sub-2-hour marathon time.

Competition	Rank	Time	Location	Date	Notes
2016 Jacksonville Half Marathon	3rd	1:03:41	Jacksonville	2016 Jan 3	Half Marathon debut
2017 New York Half Marathon	6th	1:01:12	New York City	2017 Mar 19	
2018 New York Half Marathon	8th	1:03:25	New York City	2018 Mar 18	
2018 USATF Half Marathon Championships	1st	1:02:37	Pittsburgh	2018 May 5	

=== Marathons ===
Competition	Rank	Time	Location	Date	Notes
2017 Chicago Marathon	9th	2:12:50	Chicago	2017 Oct 8	Marathon debut, 2nd American
2018 New York City Marathon	10th	2:13:08	New York City	2018 Nov 4	

== Personal bests ==
Distance	Mark	Date	Location	Event
3000m	7:43.77	July 24, 2015	London Olympic Stadium	London Diamond League
5000m	13:08.04	September 6, 2013	Brussels, Belgium	Memorial van Damme
10000m	27:31.38	April 30, 2012	Stanford, CA	Payton Jordan Invite
Marathon	2:12:50	October 8, 2017	Chicago, IL	Chicago Marathon
