= Titus Mbishei =

Kenyan long-distance runner (born 1990)

Titus Kipjumba Mbishei (born 28 October 1990 in Mount Elgon District) is a Kenyan long-distance runner who competes in track, cross country and road running. He won medals at world junior level and has represented Kenya at the Commonwealth Games.

He made his international debut in 2008: having come fifth in the national junior race, he was selected for the 2008 IAAF World Cross Country Championships and took fifth place on the international stage, helping Kenya to the team title. He repeated national and world placings again in the 10,000 metres – he won the silver medal at the 2008 World Junior Championships in Athletics in a personal best time of 27:31.65 minutes after having come second at the Kenyan junior trials. He returned to the world stage in 2009, taking a silver medal in the junior race at the 2009 IAAF World Cross Country Championships behind pre-race favourite Ayele Abshero. He began competing on the European circuit towards the end of the year, running at the Cross de l'Acier and winning the Course de l'Escalade in Geneva in December.

Mbishei stepped up to the senior ranks in 2010. He took fourth place at the Campaccio meeting and second at the Great Edinburgh Cross Country, but didn't manage to qualify for the senior men's team for the world cross that year. He enjoyed success on the roads, however, claiming victory at the Great Edinburgh Run and then at the World 10K Bangalore in May. He easily won the 10,000 m at the Kenya national selection event for the 2010 Commonwealth Games, gaining himself a place on the team. At the Games in New Delhi he just fell short of obtaining a medal, finishing in fourth place.

He started his 2011 cross country preparation well with runner-up finishes at both the Antrim International Cross Country and the Cross de San Sebastián.
