= Sule Utura =

Ethiopian long-distance runner (born 1990)

Medal record

Women's athletics

Representing Ethiopia

All-Africa Games
Gold medal – first place	2011 Maputo	5000 m
Gold medal – first place	2011 Maputo	10,000 m

Gedo Sule Utura (born 8 February 1990 in Bore, Ethiopia) is an Ethiopian middle distance and long distance runner. She won the 5000 metres at the 2008 World Junior Championships in Athletics and was third place in the 3000 metres at the World Youth Championships in the previous year.

She began competing at road running events: she ran the second leg for the victorious Ethiopian team at the 2008 International Chiba Ekiden and won the BOclassic in 2009. She was the bronze medallist over 5000 m at the 2009 African Junior Athletics Championships. She took the 10K title at the Great Ethiopian Run in November 2010 in a time of 33:35 minutes and was second at that year's BOclassic behind Vivian Cheruiyot.

She ran at the Trofeo Alasport cross country race in March 2011 and was narrowly beaten by Sylvia Kibet at the line. In the absence of major national rivals, she easily won the 5000 m at the Ethiopian Athletics Championships, although the time was slow. At the 2011 All-Africa Games she secured a 5000/10,000 m double. At the start of the 2012 season she was runner-up at the Trofeo Alasport.

== Achievements ==
Year	Competition	Venue	Position	Event	Notes
Representing Ethiopia
2007	World Cross Country Championships	Mombasa, Kenya	4th	Junior race (6 km)	21:13
2007	World Youth Championships in Athletics	Ostrava, Czech Republic	3rd	3000 m	9:06.48
2008	World Junior Championships in Athletics	Bydgoszcz, Poland	1st	5000 m	16:15.59
2009	World Cross Country Championships	Amman, Jordan	6th	Junior race (6 km)	20:38
2011	All-Africa Games	Maputo, Mozambique	1st	5000 m	15:38.70
2011	All-Africa Games	Maputo, Mozambique	1st	10,000 m	33:24.82

== Personal bests ==
Event	Time	Date	Place
1500 m	4:13.42	2 June 2007	Trento, Italy
3000 m	8:43.72	7 July 2010	Rethymno, Greece
5000 m	14:44.21	23 May 2010	Shanghai, China
