= Rock 'n' Roll New Orleans Marathon =

Annual race in the United States held from 1965 to 2022

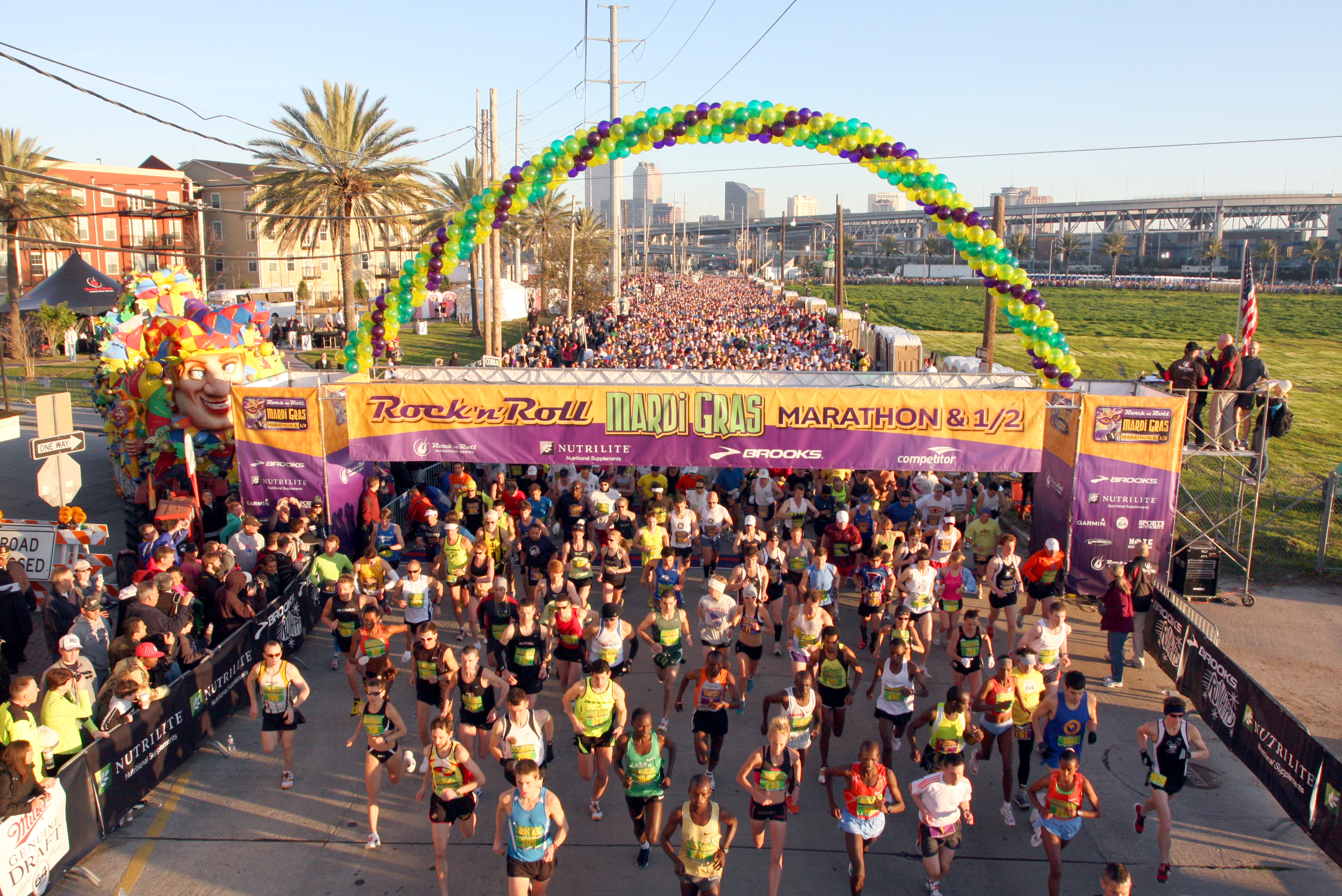
- Start line in 2010
- Date: Around February
- Location: New Orleans, Louisiana, US
- Event type: Road
- Distance: Marathon and half marathon
- Established: 1965 (61 years ago)
- Last held: 2022 (4 years ago)
- Website: Rock 'n' Roll New Orleans Marathon

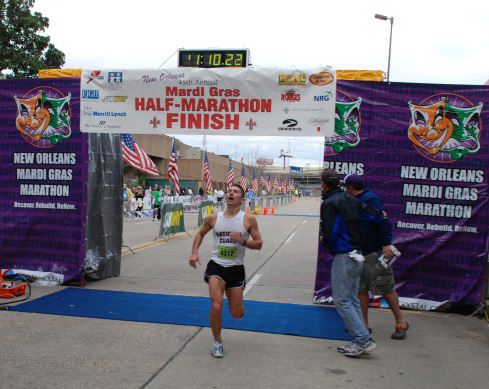
Half marathon finish line in 2009

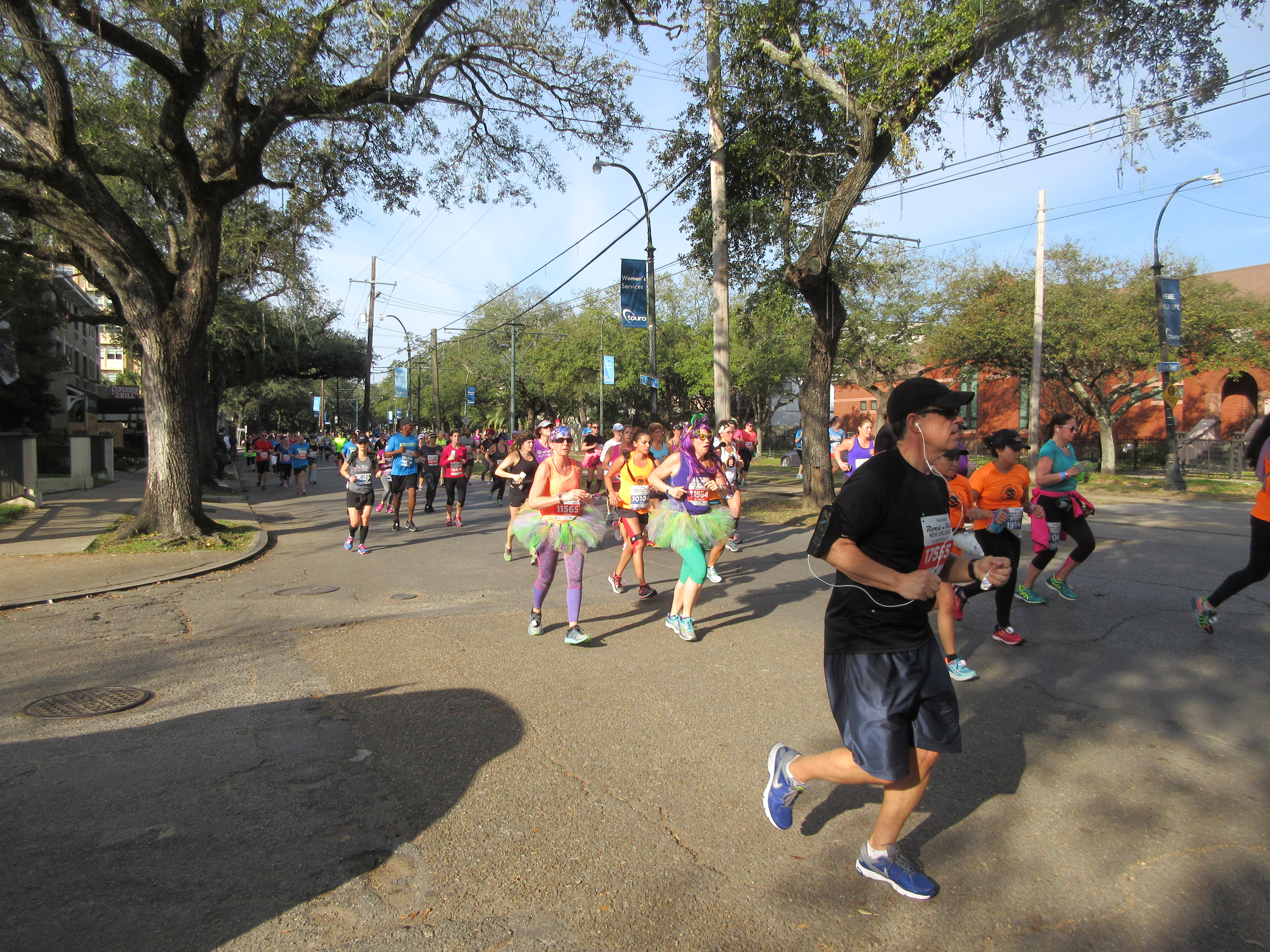
St. Charles Avenue in 2017

The Rock 'n' Roll New Orleans Marathon & 1/2 Marathon was an annual international road running marathon hosted in New Orleans, Louisiana, United States, between 1965 and 2022. It was part of the Rock 'n' Roll Marathon Series organized by Advance Publications' Ironman Group. The Ironman group announced in September 2022 that it was canceling all future running events in New Orleans due to conflicts with the city over routing and police staffing.

== History ==
On March 6, 1965, the New Orleans Road Runners Club held the inaugural race, named "The New Orleans Marathon," on the Mississippi levee, from behind the zoo at Audubon Park to St. Rose and back. The race had 19 starters and 12 finishers, and was held with no aid stations. Harry Belin, a Tulane University student, won the race in 2:47:30.

The marathon was held annually since, except for 1968.

In the 1980s, a noted local participant was John Allen Dixon Jr., Chief Justice of the Louisiana Supreme Court, who won the race in the over-60 category several times.

The event was taken over by Competitor Group for the 2010 edition and adopted the Rock 'n' Roll Series name after its takeover.

In 2010, the marathon was run as an open class or mass race while the half marathon formed the elite section of the event. The elite competition started strongly, with Martin Lel beating Samuel Wanjiru in the men's section while Berhane Adere and Kim Smith ran the fastest and third-fastest times ever on American soil, for first and second place respectively. A total of around 13,000 runners participated in the day's events.

In 2011, Kim Smith returned to set a 19-second personal best of 1:07:36, a new U.S. all-comer's record for the women's half marathon.

The 2021 edition of the race was cancelled due to the coronavirus pandemic.

== Course ==
External images
- Course map of full marathon in 2009
- Combined course map in 2020

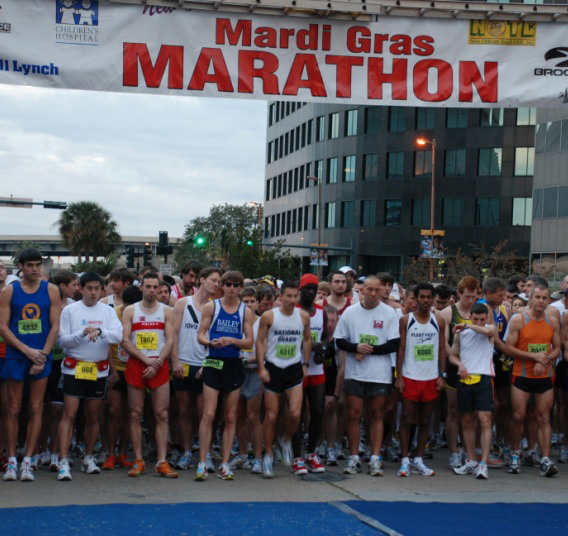
Start line in 2009

The marathon started on Poydras Street near Lafayette Square in the Central Business District and ends in City Park near Tad Gormley Stadium.

The course made significant use of St. Charles Avenue, Decatur Street, Esplanade Avenue, Wisner Boulevard, and Lakeshore Drive along Lake Pontchartrain.

== Winners ==
Key: Course record (in bold)

=== Marathon ===
Ed.	Year	Men's winner	Time	Women's winner	Time	Rf.
1	1965	Harry Belin	2:47:30			
45	2009	Meyer Friedman	2:24:32	Autumn Ray	2:58:23	
46	2010	Paul Wachira (KEN)	2:22:31	Karen Barlow (AUS)	2:46:06	
47	2011	Fred Joslyn (USA)	2:18:49	Joasia Zakrzewski (SCO)	2:47:24	
48	2012	Meyer Friedman (USA)	2:27:02	Meggan Franks (CAN)	2:49:06	
49	2013	Meyer Friedman (USA)	2:28:43	Karen Lockyer (NZL)	2:52:23	
50	2014	Ben Bruce (USA)	2:21:56	Andrea Duke (USA)	2:58:55	
51	2015	John Brigham (USA)	2:28:45	Samantha Gardner (USA)	3:03:41	
52	2016	Geoffrey Burns (USA)	2:24:57	Meggan Franks (CAN)	2:51:50	
53	2017	Clay Emge (USA)	2:34:14	Hannah Cooling (USA)	2:50:28	
54	2018	Marcus Hoof (USA)	2:33:43	Kylen Cieslak (USA)	2:56:36	
55	2019	Ryan Hendricks (USA)	2:33:07	Kayla Campasino (USA)	2:55:03	
56	2020	Brett Morley (USA)	2:27:46	Carly Forte (USA)	3:07:13	
	2021	cancelled due to coronavirus pandemic				

=== Half marathon ===
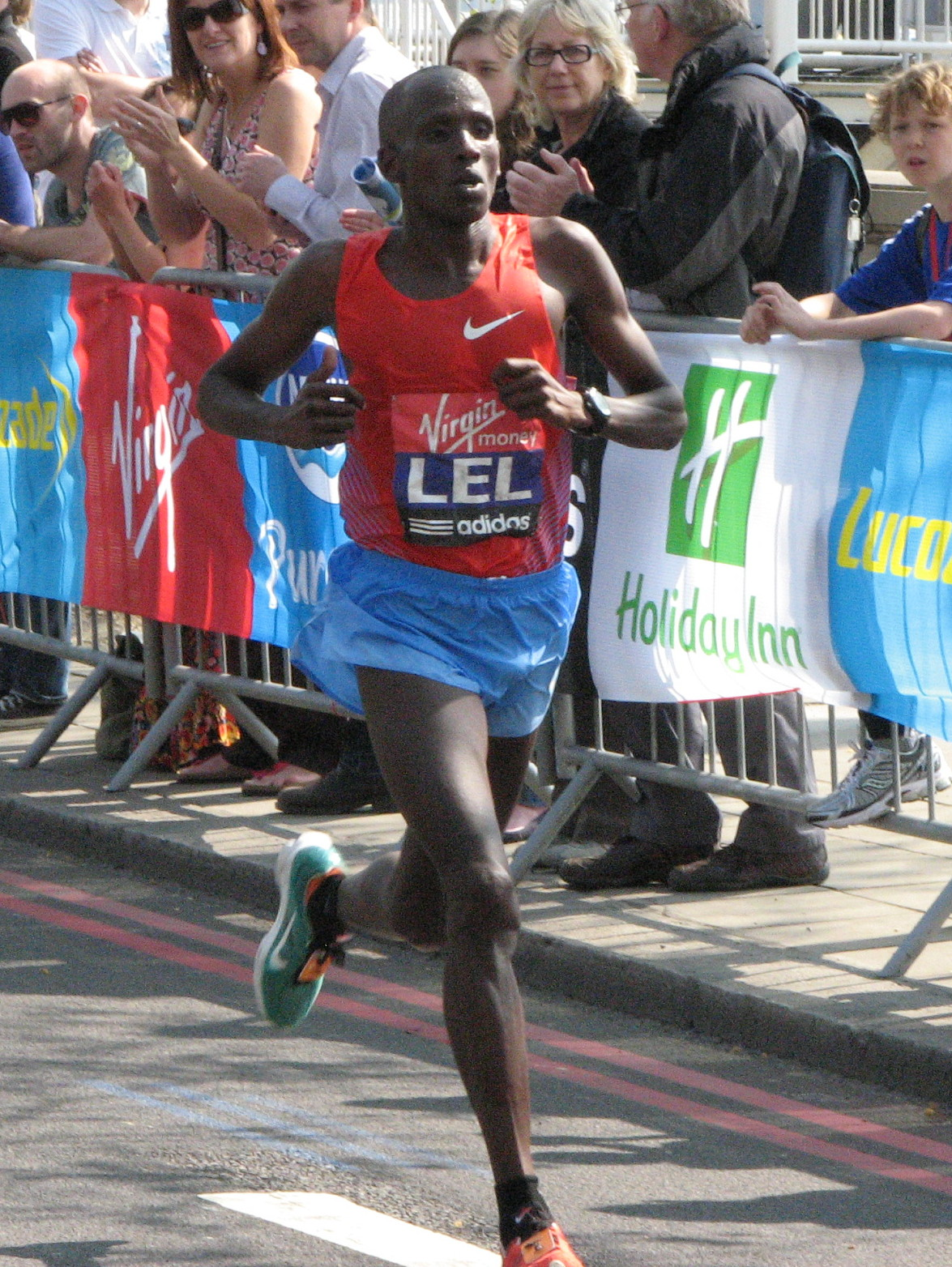
Martin Lel (pictured here in London) beat Olympic marathon champion Samuel Wanjiru to win the half in 2010

Ed. (Note: Edition numbers are based on the marathon competition.)	Year	Men's winner	Time	Women's winner	Time	Rf.
45	2009	Hillary Kogo	1:08:47	Victoria Martinez	1:21:17	
46	2010	Martin Lel (KEN)	1:01:07	Berhane Adere (ETH)	1:07:52	
47	2011	Josphat Boit (KEN)	1:03:57	Kim Smith (NZL)	1:07:36	
48	2012	Shadrack Biwott (KEN)	1:04:23	Gabriela Traña (CRC)	1:16:31 NR	
49	2013	Mo Farah (GBR)	**1:00:59**	Meseret Defar (ETH)	**1:07:25**	
50	2014	Liam Burke (USA)	1:11:35	Karen Lockyer (NZL)	1:20:29	
51	2015	Mike Popejoy (USA)	1:05:18	Janet Cherobon-Bawcom (USA)	1:12:22	
52	2016	Emil Dobrowolski (POL)	1:04:16	Neely Spence Gracey (USA)	1:14:19	
53	2017	Jack St. Marie (USA)	1:09:04	Neely Spence Gracey (USA)	1:11:02	
54	2018	Kevin Castille (USA)	1:05:58	Sarah Crouch (USA)	1:17:31	
55	2019	Dathan Ritzenhein (USA)	1:01:24	Berhane Dibaba (ETH)	1:11:31	
56	2020	Panuel Mkungo (KEN)	1:02:05	Amy Cragg (USA)	1:16:53	
	2021	cancelled due to coronavirus pandemic				
