= German Fernandez =

American runner

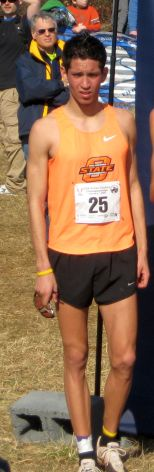
- Fernandez after winning the 2009 US Junior Cross Country Championships

Personal information
- Nationality: American
- Born: 2 November 1990 (age 35) Riverbank, California, U.S.
- Height: 6 ft 0 in (183 cm)
- Weight: 147 lb (67 kg)

Sport
- Country: United States
- Sport: Athletics/Track, Long-distance running
- Events: 1500 meters, 3000 meters, 5000 meters
- College team: Oklahoma State Cowboys
- Club: Bowerman Track Club
- Turned pro: 2012
- Coached by: Jerry Schumacher

Achievements and titles
- Personal bests: Outdoor; 1500 m: 3:34.60 (Berlin 2012); 5000 m: 13:25.46 AJR (Eugene 2009); 10,000 m: 28:06.64 (Palo Alto 2016); Indoor; Mile: 3:55.02i WJR (College Station 2009); 3000 m: 7:47.97i OT AJR (Seattle 2009); Road; 5 km: 13:39 (San Jose 2016)

German Fernandez (born November 2, 1990) is an American retired professional runner from Riverbank, California, known for his performance in high school and collegiate cross country and track and field. Later he trained under Jerry Schumacher for the Bowerman Track Club. He is most well known for running the California Cross Country State Meet course record (14:24), as well as running a new American high-school record, 8:34.40 for two miles, at the 2008 Nike Outdoor Nationals championship. He previously held the World Junior Indoor Mile record at 3:55.02 until it was broken by Cameron Myers with a time of 3:53.12, subsequently bettered to 3:47.48. A local meet in Riverbank, California, the German Fernandez Distance Carnival, is named after him.

== Running career ==
=== High school ===
Fernandez was coached by Bruce Edwards of Riverbank High School, which competes in Division IV of the Sac-Joaquin Section. Fernandez first drew some attention as a high school freshman in track, when he raced 1600m in 4:22.95. During his 2005 CIF State championship victory, he clocked the second fastest sophomore time of all divisions, 15:14, on the heralded Woodward Park course. He went through a number of injuries throughout his junior year, giving him a relatively slow season. Fernandez set a number of course records in California. He won the prestigious Stanford Invitational (5k) with a time of 14:42, gapping the second place runner by 40 seconds. He won the Sac-Joaquin Section finals race with a time of 15:03, setting the course record and leading his team to win the section title. This culminated with his performance at the 2007 California CIF state meet where he ran the 5k race in 14:24, breaking the historic course record set by Olympian Marc Davis by 14 seconds. The performance is seen as one of the most outstanding in the history of high school distance running.

In 2007, Fernandez took first place at the Foot Locker West Regional, finishing in a time of 14:53. Running with an injured foot, Fernandez finished his high school cross country career placing third at the 2007 Foot Locker Cross Country Championships, 19 seconds behind winner Mike Fout of La Porte, Indiana.

On February 16, 2008, Fernandez won the USATF Cross Country Junior Nationals at Mission Bay Park in San Diego in 24:18. This earned him a berth to the USA squad for the IAAF Junior World Cross Country Championships.

In the 2008 CIF California State Meet at Cerritos College in Norwalk, California, Fernandez ran a 4:00.29 for 1600 meters to break Ryan Hall's state meet record of 4:02.62, and 3 hours later, ran the 3200m in 8:34.23. Fernandez's 8:34.23 (≈8:37.43 for 2 miles) converts slightly slower to the American high school 2-mile (3.2 km) record of 8:36.3. However, his 4:00.29/8:34.23 double for 1600/3200 meters is the fastest distance double in American high school history, beating Rich Kimball's 4:06.6/8:46.5 mile/two-mile double set at the 1974 California state high school championship meet.

Three weeks later, on June 20, 2008, Fernandez surpassed Jeff Nelson's 29-year-old national high school record for the 2-mile (3.2 km) race at Nike Outdoor Nationals, winning with a time of 8:34.40. Fernandez opened his first mile in 4:19.4, and finished with a second mile of 4:15. He also broke Galen Rupp's high school 3000 meter record with a 3000-meter split of 7:59.82.

He was Track and Field News "High School Athlete of the Year" in 2008.

=== Collegiate ===
The top distance recruit in the nation, Fernandez elected to attend Oklahoma State University in Stillwater, Oklahoma, to run for Coach Dave Smith. During the Razorback Invitational, Fernandez broke a World Junior Record by running 3:56.5 mile indoors. At the Big 12 Championships, he ran 3:55.02 to further his record and beat the converted collegiate indoor record in the mile.

In outdoor track, he broke Galen Rupp's American Junior Record at 5000 meters at the Payton Jordan Cardinal Invitational, but Chris Derrick finished ahead of German to take the American Junior Record. However, at the 2009 USA Outdoor Track and Field National Championships he placed 5th in the 5000m, beating Derrick's American Junior Record in a time of 13:25.46.

He was the 2009 NCAA Division I champion in the outdoor 1500 meters, winning in 3:39.00.

Year	Big 12 xc	NCAA xc	Big 12 indoor	NCAA indoor	Big 12 Outdoor	NCAA Outdoor
2008-2009	1st 23:47.38	DNF	1st Mile 3:55.02; 3000 m	-	1st 1,500 meters 1st 5,000 meters	1st 1500 m 3:39.00
2009-2010	4th	77th	Mile 4:06.44(pre)	-	-	-
2010-2011	2nd 23:58.20	8th 29:49.3	1st Mile 4:06.22	3000	5000	-
2011-2012	1st 23:25.4	11th 29:32.9	9th DMR 10:00.73	-	4th 5000 m 14:03.34; 2nd 1500 m 3:43.70	10th 1500 m 3:46.62

=== Bowerman Track Club ===
Fernandez was coached by Jerry Schumacher in Portland, Oregon, where he trained with his 2009 IAAF World Cross Country Championships teammate Chris Derrick. Fernandez finished 11th at 2009 IAAF World Cross Country Championships – Junior men's race. He finished 25th at the 36th 2008 2008 IAAF World Cross Country Championships – Junior men's race with a time of 24:15, leading Team United States to a sixth-place team finish in Edinburgh, Scotland. Fernandez ran 13:47 5000 meters on 15 June 2014 at the Portland Track Festival.

Fernandez finished 2nd at 2014 USA Road 5k Championships and 8th the following year.

=== Post-professional Career ===
In February 2017, Fernandez joined his alma mater as a graduate assistant coach.

== Personal bests ==
Distance	Mark	Date	Location	Type of terrain
1500 m	3:34.60	9-2-2012	Berlin ISTAF	Outdoor track
Mile run	3:55.02i*	1-24-2009	College Station, TX	Indoor track
3000 m	7:47.97i	2-14-2009	Seattle, WA	Indoor track (Oversized)
2 mile run	8:34.40**	6-20-2008	Greensboro, NC	Outdoor track
5000 m	13:25.46***	6-26-2009	Eugene, OR	Outdoor track
8000 m	23:20.00	2-7-2009	Derwood, MD	Cross country
10,000 m	29:15.30	10-16-2010	Fayetteville, AR	Outdoor track
Half marathon	1:09:45	2-4-2007	Davis, CA	Road race

* This is the Junior (under age 20) Indoor World Record

** Stood as the American High School record until 2011

*** This is the Junior (under age 20) American national record

Awards
Preceded by Walter Henning	Track & Field News High School Boys Athlete of the Year; 2008	Succeeded by Mason Finley
