= Jackline Chepngeno =

Kenyan track and field athlete

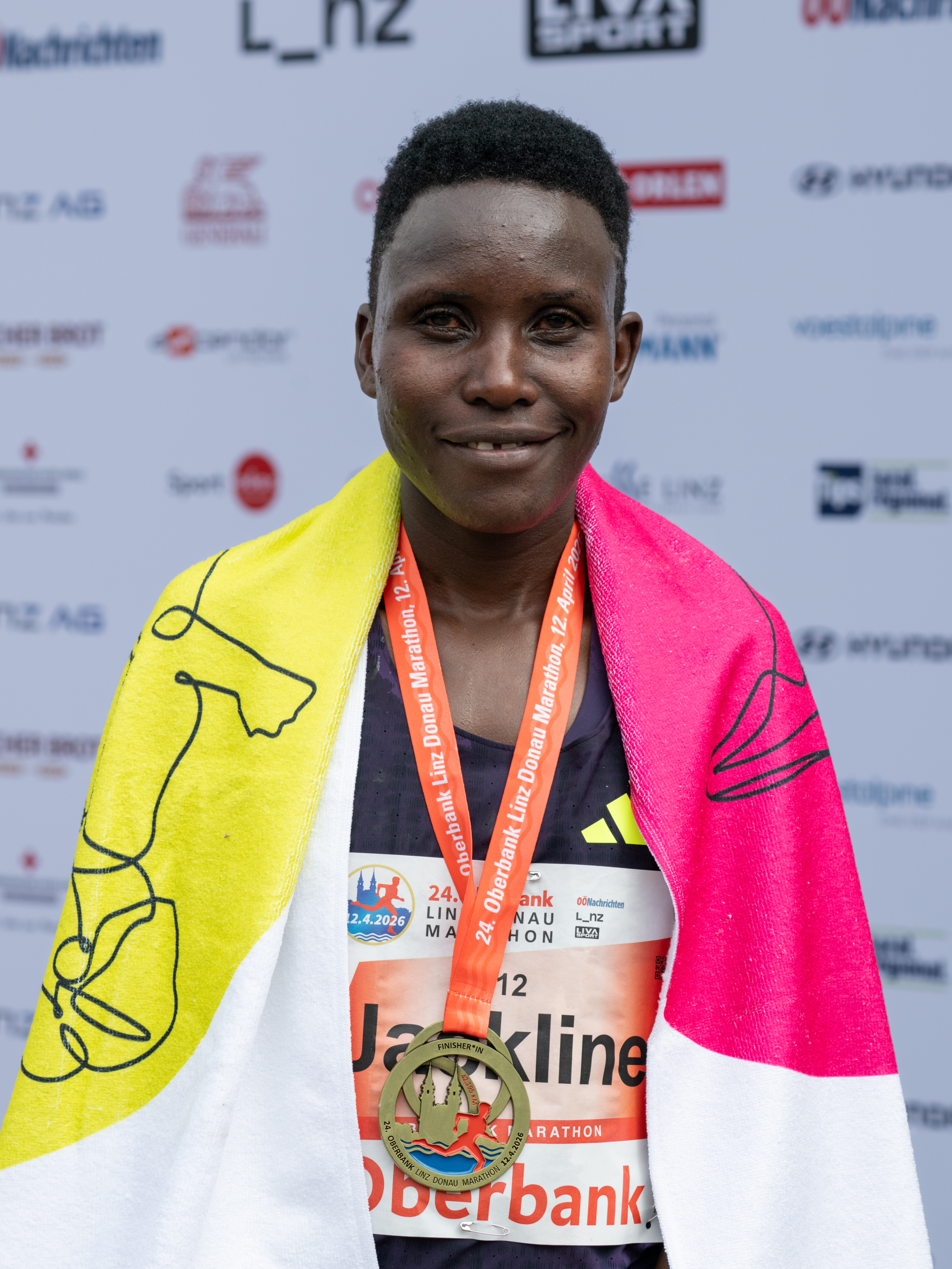
- Jackline Chepngeno in 2026

Personal information
- Nationality: Kenyan
- Born: 16 January 1993 (age 33) Kenya

Sport
- Country: Kenya
- Sport: Track and field
- Events: 3000 metres, 5000 metres, 10000 metres, Cross country running
Medal record
Women's athletics
Representing Kenya
World Cross Country Championships
Bronze medal – third place	2009 Amman	U20
African Championships in Athletics
Silver medal – second place	2016 Durban	10,000 m
World Youth Championships
Silver medal – second place	2009 Brixen	3000m

Jackline Chepngeno (born 16 January 1993) is a Kenyan long-distance runner.

== Career ==
Chepngeno won the Under-20 bronze medal at the 2009 World Cross-Country Championships over a 6 km course, with Genzebe Dibaba of Ethiopia claiming the gold and Mercy Cherono of Kenya taking silver.

Having been out of competition for five years due to two serious leg injuries, Chepngeno finished second behind Joyce Chepkirui in the 10,000m at the Kenyan national championships in July 2015, with a time of 32.08.18.

In 2016 she won the women's section of the Nandi Tea Half Marathon, having been in fourth place at 6 km before taking the lead from 7 km and maintaining the lead position until the end. A few months later she took silver in the 10,000m at the Africa Senior Championships in South Africa with a time of 31:27:73.

== Medal performances ==
Source: World Athletics

Medal	Championships	Event	Time	Venue	Date
Bronze	2009 IAAF World Cross Country Championships	Cross country running	20:27	Golf Club Al Bisharat, Amman (JOR)	28 March 2009
Silver	2009 World Youth Championships in Athletics	3000 metres	9:05.93	Bressanone (ITA)	8 July 2009
Silver	2016 African Championships in Athletics	3000 metres	31:27.73	Durban (RSA)	25 June 2016
