= Frehiwat Goshu =

Ethiopian long-distance runner

Frehiwat Goshu (born 28 June 1990) is an Ethiopian long-distance runner who specializes in the 3000 metres.

Her international debut came at the 2007 African Junior Athletics Championships, where she came fourth over 1500 metres. She won the bronze medal in the 3000 metres at the 2008 World Junior Championships and finished ninth at the 2009 World Athletics Final. She also finished fourth in the junior race at the 2009 World Cross Country Championships. She won the 2010 Cross Internacional Juan Muguerza and in 2011 was the winner at the Madrid Half Marathon and runner-up at the Madrid 10K. She took second place behind Priscah Cherono at the Cross Internacional de la Constitución in December 2011.

Her personal best times are 4:13.54 minutes in the 1500 metres, achieved in July 2009 in Barcelona; 8:50.38 minutes in the 3000 metres, achieved in September 2009 in Rieti; and 15:21.44 minutes in the 5000 metres, achieved in June 2009 in Málaga.
