= Ayele Abshero =

Ethiopian long-distance runner (born 1990)

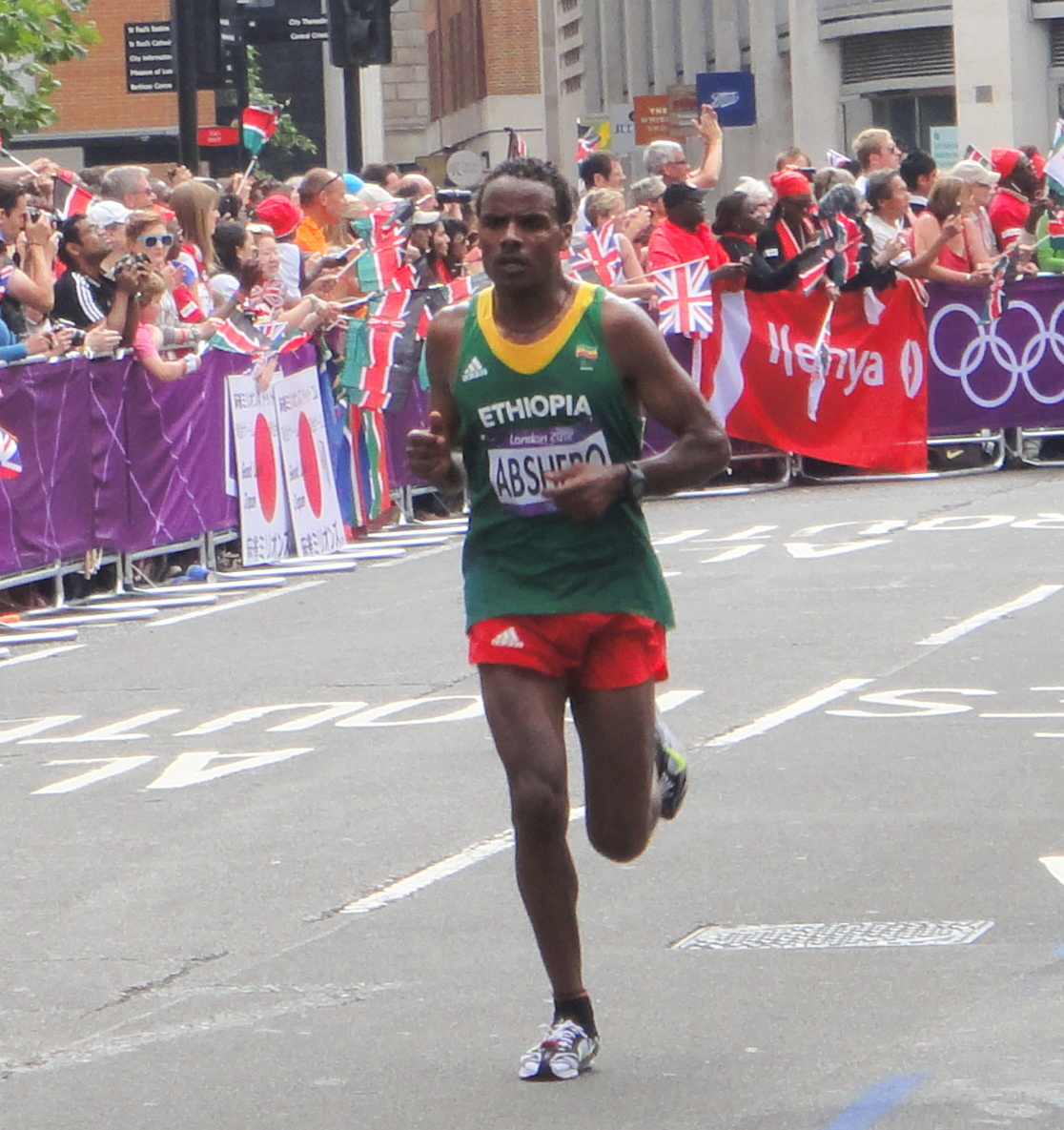

Personal information
- Nationality: Ethiopian
- Born: 28 December 1990 (age 35) Yeboba, Ethiopia
- Height: 5 ft 6 in (168 cm)
- Weight: 135 lb (61 kg; 9 st 9 lb)

Sport
- Sport: Running
- Event: Long distance
Medal record
Men's athletics
Representing Ethiopia
World Cross Country Championships
Gold medal – first place	2009 Amman	Junior race
Silver medal – second place	2008 Edinburgh	Junior race
- Updated on 14 May 2012

Ayele Abshero Biza (Amharic: አየለ አብሽሮ ቢዛ, born 28 December 1990) is an Ethiopian long-distance runner who mainly competes in cross country and road races.

He came to prominence with a junior silver medal at the 2008 IAAF World Cross Country Championships before taking the junior title in 2009. He won the 2008 Zevenheuvelenloop and 2011 Egmond Half Marathon races. He made the fastest-ever marathon debut in history at the 2012 Dubai Marathon, winning in a time of 2:04:23 hours, which was the fourth-fastest ever.

== Career ==
He began to take running seriously in order to follow in the footsteps of his older brother, Tessema Abshero, who is an accomplished marathon runner. He also was inspired by the longevity and success of fellow Ethiopian runner Haile Gebrselassie. Ayele ran at the 2007 Great Ethiopian Run, and just missed the podium with a fourth-place finish behind Feyisa Lilesa. His first opportunity to represent Ethiopia at a major competition came at the 2008 IAAF World Cross Country Championships. He competed in the junior men's race and remained near the front in the later stages, eventually taking second place behind teammate Ibrahim Jeilan. This performance earned him two silver medals, individually and with the Ethiopian team. Later that year he took part in the Zevenheuvelenloop road race in Nijmegen. He won the race in a personal best time of 45:15 minutes, defeating Olympic champion Kenenisa Bekele and his brother Tariku Bekele. This performance ranked him third-fastest over the distance that year.

Ayele began the following season with a win at the Cross Internacional Juan Muguerza race and won by a margin of thirteen seconds, finishing far ahead of senior cross country medallists Moses Mosop and Leonard Komon. After a top-five finish at the Cross Internacional de Itálica, he returned to lead the Ethiopian junior team at the 2009 IAAF World Cross Country Championships. He was the favourite to win the race and fulfilled the predictions, taking the junior gold medal ahead of the persevering Kenyan Titus Mbishei who had pushed the race tempo throughout. He ran on the track in Europe that summer and set a 5000 metres best of 13:11.38 minutes and 27:54.29 for the 10,000 metres in July. The following month, he ran for Ethiopia at the 2009 African Junior Athletics Championships and came fourth in the 5000 m. At the end of the year he again entered a Dutch 15K race, this time the Montferland Run, where he finished third some distance behind the winner Nicholas Manza Kamakya.

With many of Ethiopia's main runners absent, he gained a place on the men's senior team for the 2010 IAAF World Cross Country Championships with a runner-up performance at the Jan Meda Cross Country. He finished the race in 24th position and, as the fifth finisher among the Ethiopians, his score did not count towards the team competition. He took to the European road circuit in August, winning the Omloop race in Hem with a 10K best of 28:11 minutes. In September, he was third at the 10K race held at the Tilburg Ten Miles and took third again at the Dam tot Damloop. He secured victory at the Egmond Half Marathon with half a minute to spare at the start of 2011, recording a time of 1:02:23 for his debut over the distance. He improved upon this soon after at the City-Pier-City Loop, where he recorded 59:42 minutes for fourth in a tightly contested race.

Ayele made his debut over the marathon distance, on a record-eligible course, at the 2012 Dubai Marathon in January. On a new course, he made the fastest-ever marathon debut with a course record time of 2:04:23 hours. Moses Mosop ran a debut marathon of 2:03:06 at the 2011 Boston Marathon, but the course was not record-eligible. His time was 30 seconds faster than the course record set by Haile Gebrselassie in 2008 and made him the fourth-fastest marathoner ever. He won April's Yangzhou Jianzhen International Half Marathon and was one second off Deriba Merga's course record. He was chosen for the Ethiopian Olympic marathon team in May and set a 10K best of 27:56 minutes for third place at the Great Manchester Run later that week.

== Competition record ==
Year	Competition	Venue	Position	Event	Notes
2008	World Cross Country Championships	Edinburgh, Scotland	2nd	Junior race	(Team silver)
2009	World Cross Country Championships	Amman, Jordan	1st	Junior race	(Team silver)
2009	African Junior Championships	Bambous, Mauritius	4th	5000 m	
2010	World Cross Country Championships	Bydgoszcz, Poland	24th	Senior race	
2012	Dubai Marathon	Dubai UAE	1st	Marathon	2:04:23 CR
