= Great Edinburgh International Cross Country =

Cross country running race in Edinburgh

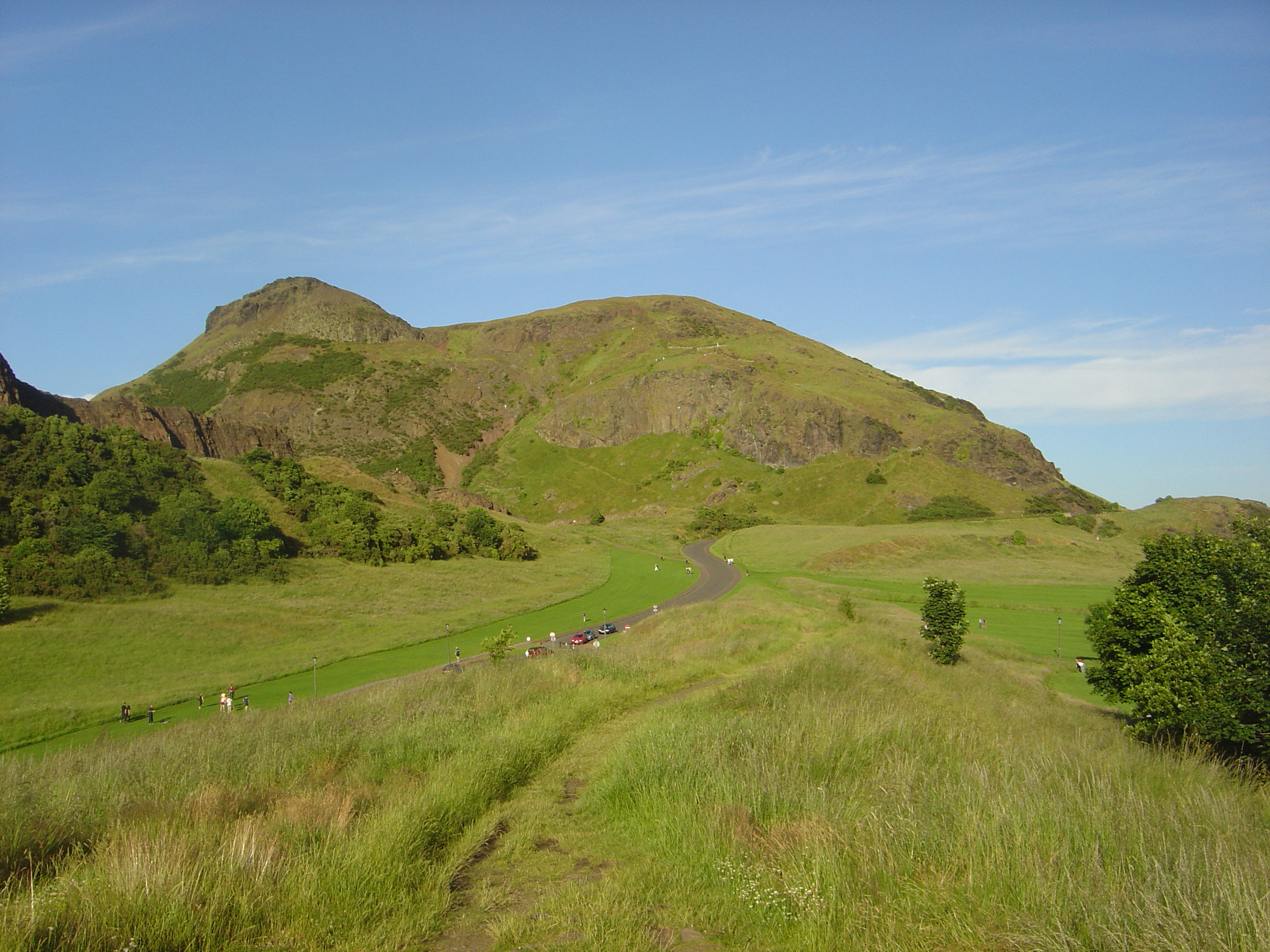
- The race takes place in the green backdrop of Holyrood Park
- Date: Early January
- Location: Edinburgh, Scotland
- Event type: Cross country
- Distance: 8 km for men 6 km for women 4x1 km mixed relay
- Established: 2005
- Website: Great Edinburgh International Cross Country

The Great Edinburgh International Cross Country was an annual cross country running competition that took place every January in Edinburgh, Scotland. It was one of the competitions in the Great Run series of athletics events and was held alongside the Great Winter Run 5 kilometres mass participation race. The event was first held in Edinburgh in 2005 after the city was awarded the Great North Cross Country which relocated from Durham. The Great Edinburgh International Cross Country featured three professional races: the men's 8 km race, the women's 6 km race, and the 4x1km relay. It was an IAAF permit meeting, which means that performances could be used to qualify for the annual IAAF World Cross Country Championships. It was announced on the BBC coverage of the 2018 event that that year's edition would be its last. The event was replaced by the Great Stirling Cross Country in nearby Stirling.

The grassy, occasionally muddy, course in Holyrood Park ran in a circular, clockwise pattern. The same venue was used to host the 2003 European Cross Country Championships and the 2008 IAAF World Cross Country Championships. It had relatively difficult routes in the past, with runners twice having to climb and descend Haggis Knowe (a steep hill) in 2009. The meeting attracted cross country athletes of the highest calibre, with past competitors including six-time World Champion Kenenisa Bekele, Gebregziabher Gebremariam, Tirunesh Dibaba and Eliud Kipchoge.

The meeting was broadcast by the BBC annually, and received sponsorship from VisitScotland (in 2006) Bupa (from 2007 to 2014) and PureGym in 2016.

A new team competition format was introduced for the 2011 event. The four teams assembled were Great Britain, Europe, the United States and Great Britain Under-23s. Britain's Mo Farah won the race but the Europeans, featuring all the reigning European Cross medallists, won the overall team challenge.

Garrett Heath had three consecutive wins in the men's race from 2014 to 2016, two on the short course and one on the long.

== Past winners ==
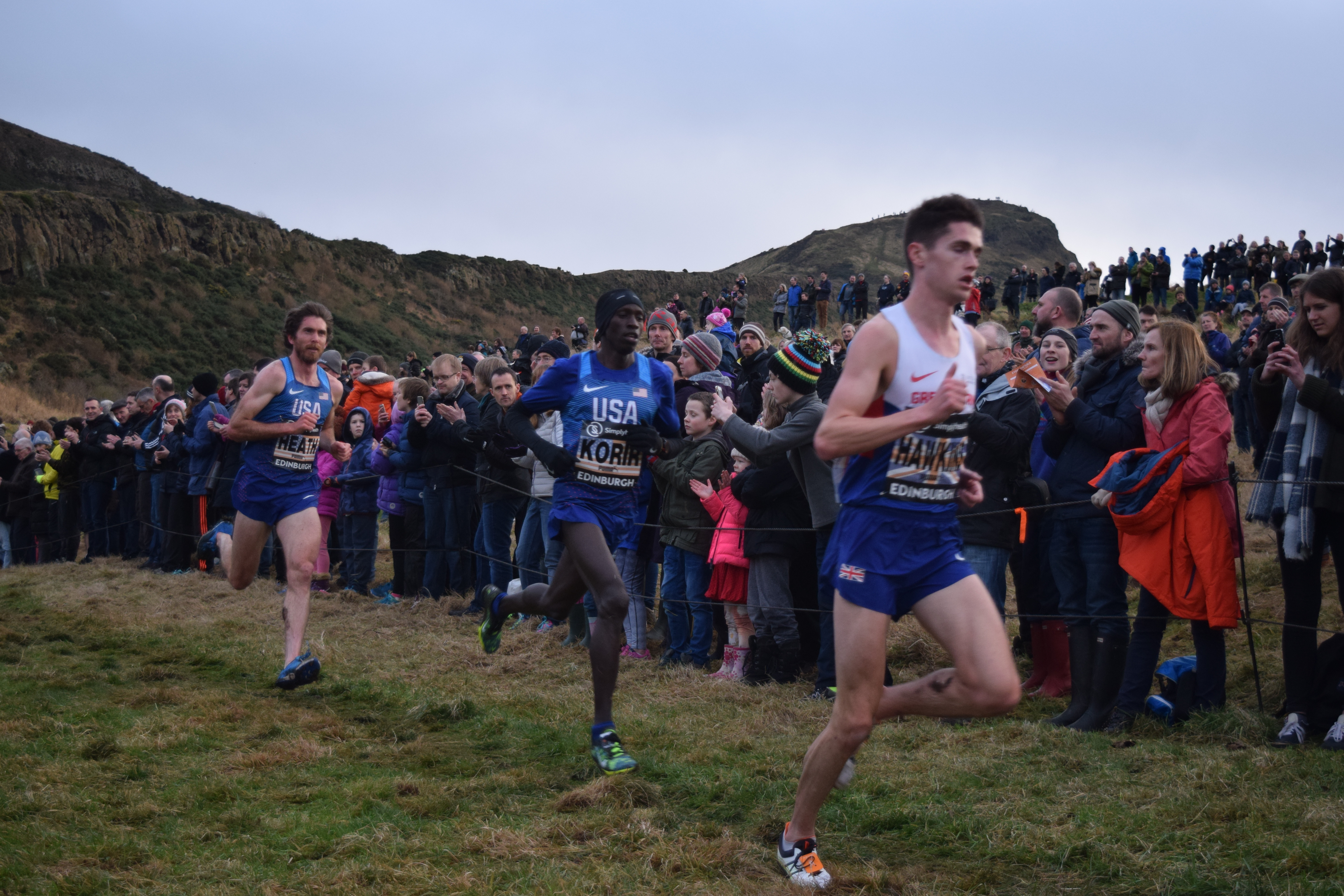
Korir (2017 winner) with Hawkins (2017 runner-up) and Heath (2014, 2015 and 2016 winner)

Long course winners
Edition	Year	Men's winner	Time (m:s)	Women's winner	Time (m:s)
1st	2005	Eliud Kipchoge (KEN)	27:43	Tirunesh Dibaba (ETH)	21:35
2nd	2006	Kenenisa Bekele (ETH)	26:08	Gelete Burka (ETH)	19:01
3rd	2007	Kenenisa Bekele (ETH)	28:14	Gelete Burka (ETH)	23:25
4th	2008	Kenenisa Bekele (ETH)	27:42	Gelete Burka (ETH)	19:58
5th	2009	Abebe Dinkesa (ETH)	26:51	Linet Masai (KEN)	19:02
6th	2010	Joseph Ebuya (KEN)	28:41	Tirunesh Dibaba (ETH)	21:37
7th	2011	Mo Farah (GBR)	25:41	Linet Masai (KEN)	20:24
8th	2012	Ayad Lamdassem (ESP)	25:44	Fionnuala Britton (IRL)	21:32
9th	2013	Bobby Mack (USA)	24:27	Fionnuala Britton (IRL)	20:40
10th	2014	Chris Derrick (USA)	24:11	Gemma Steel (GBR)	20:35
11th	2015	Chris Derrick (USA)	25:31	Emelia Gorecka (GBR)	21:26
12th	2016	Garrett Heath (USA)	25:29	Kate Avery (GBR)	21:05
13th	2017	Leonard Korir (USA)	24:03	Yasemin Can (TUR)	20:36
14th	2018	Leonard Korir (USA)	24:32	Yasemin Can (TUR)	20:58

Short course winners
Edition	Year	Men's winner	Time (m:s)	Women's winner	Time (m:s)
1st	2005	Nick McCormick (GBR)	12:22		
2nd	2006	Nick McCormick (GBR)	12:16		
3rd	2007	Serhiy Lebid (UKR)	12:20		
4th	2008	Andrew Baddeley (GBR)	12:52		
5th	2009	Andrew Baddeley (GBR)	12:17		
6th	2010	Ricky Stevenson (GBR)	13:20		
7th	2011	Eliud Kipchoge (KEN)	13:12		
8th	2012	Asbel Kiprop (KEN)	9:20 (3 km)		
9th	2013			Genzebe Dibaba (ETH)	9:46 (3 km)
10th	2014	Garrett Heath (USA)	11:51 (4 km)		
11th	2015	Garrett Heath (USA)	12:11 (4 km)		

- All information taken from official website.
