= 2009 IAAF World Cross Country Championships =

Coordinates: 31°51′58″N 35°52′25″E

- Organisers: IAAF
- Edition: 37th
- Date: March 28
- Host city: Amman, Jordan
- Venue: Al Bisharat Golf Course
- Events: 4
- Distances: 12 km – Senior men 8 km – Junior men 8 km – Senior women 6 km – Junior women
- Participation: 459 athletes from 59 nations

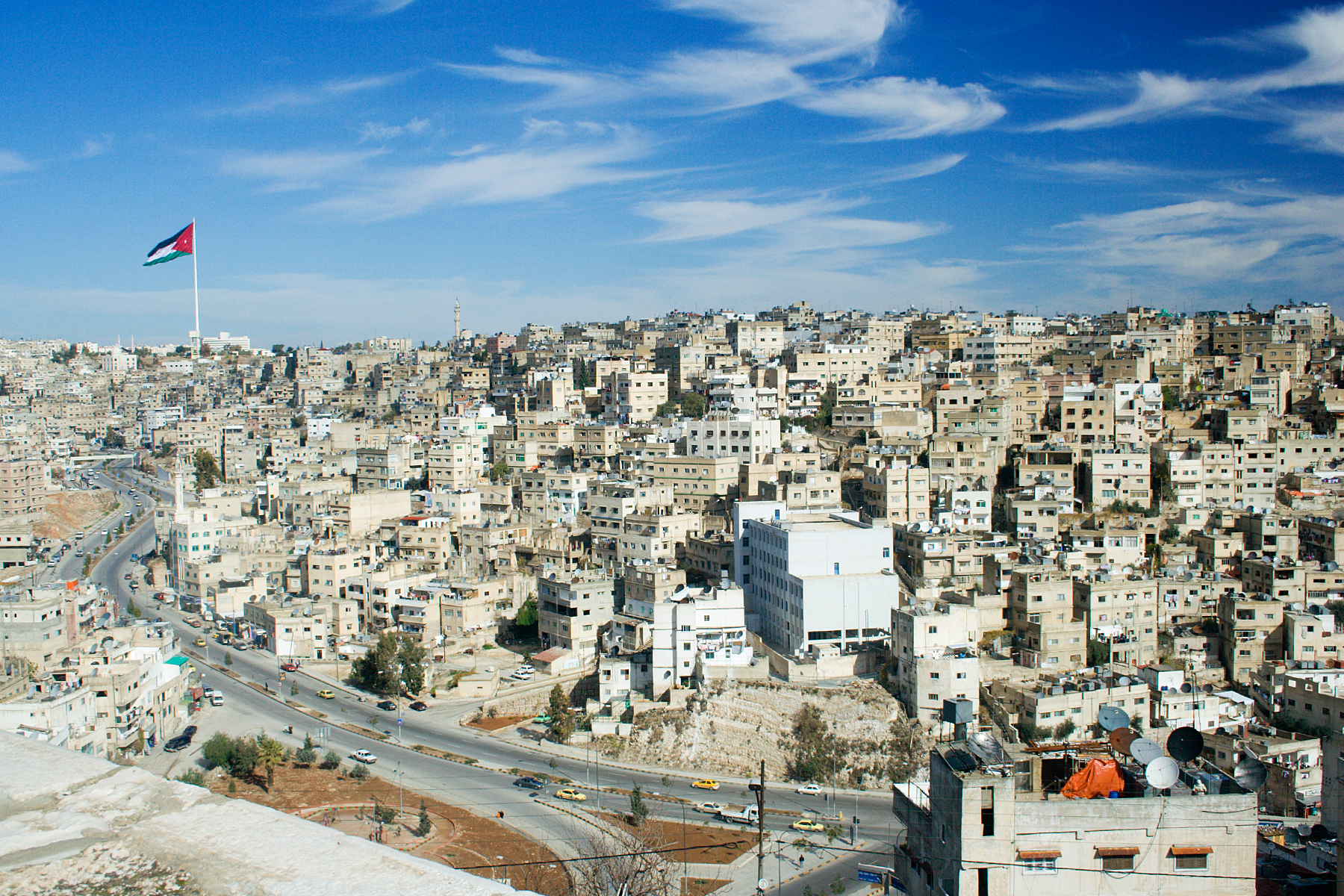
An overview of Amman in Jordan, the host city

The 2009 IAAF World Cross Country Championships took place on March 28, 2009. The races were held at the Al Bisharat Golf Course in Amman, Jordan. Four races took place, one for men, women, junior men and junior women respectively. All races encompassed both individual and team competition. Amman is also only the second occasion on which Asia has hosted the World Cross Country Championships, which are the oldest IAAF World Athletics Series event, first celebrated under the IAAF banner in 1973.

== Competition notes ==
The senior male team for Kenya won their 22nd team title in 24 years despite the fact that no senior male runner from Kenya has won an individual title since 1999.

Florence Kiplagat was the first Kenyan senior women's winner since Helen Chepngeno in 1994. She was quoted saying, ‘’I would like to thank God,” she said. “Kenya has not won since 1994. We are determined to perform at the same level as Kenyan men.”

Further race reports of the event were given in The New York Times and for the IAAF.

== Medallists ==
Event	Gold		Silver		Bronze	
Individual
Senior men (12 km)	Gebre-egziabher Gebremariam; Ethiopia	35:02	Moses Ndiema Kipsiro; Uganda	35:04	Zersenay Tadese; Eritrea	35:04
Junior men (8 km)	Ayele Abshero; Ethiopia	23:26	Titus Kipjumba Mbishei; Kenya	23:30	Moses Kibet; Uganda	23:35
Senior women (8 km)	Florence Jebet Kiplagat; Kenya	26:13	Linet Chepkwemoi Masai; Kenya	26:16	Meselech Melkamu; Ethiopia	26:19
Junior women (6 km)	Genzebe Dibaba; Ethiopia	20:14	Mercy Cherono; Kenya	20:17	Jackline Chepngeno; Kenya	20:27
Team
Senior men	Kenya	28	Ethiopia	28	Eritrea	50
Junior men	Kenya	20	Ethiopia	22	Eritrea	72
Senior women	Kenya	14	Ethiopia	28	Portugal	72
Junior women	Ethiopia	18	Kenya	18	Japan	76

== Race results ==
=== Senior men's race (12 km) ===
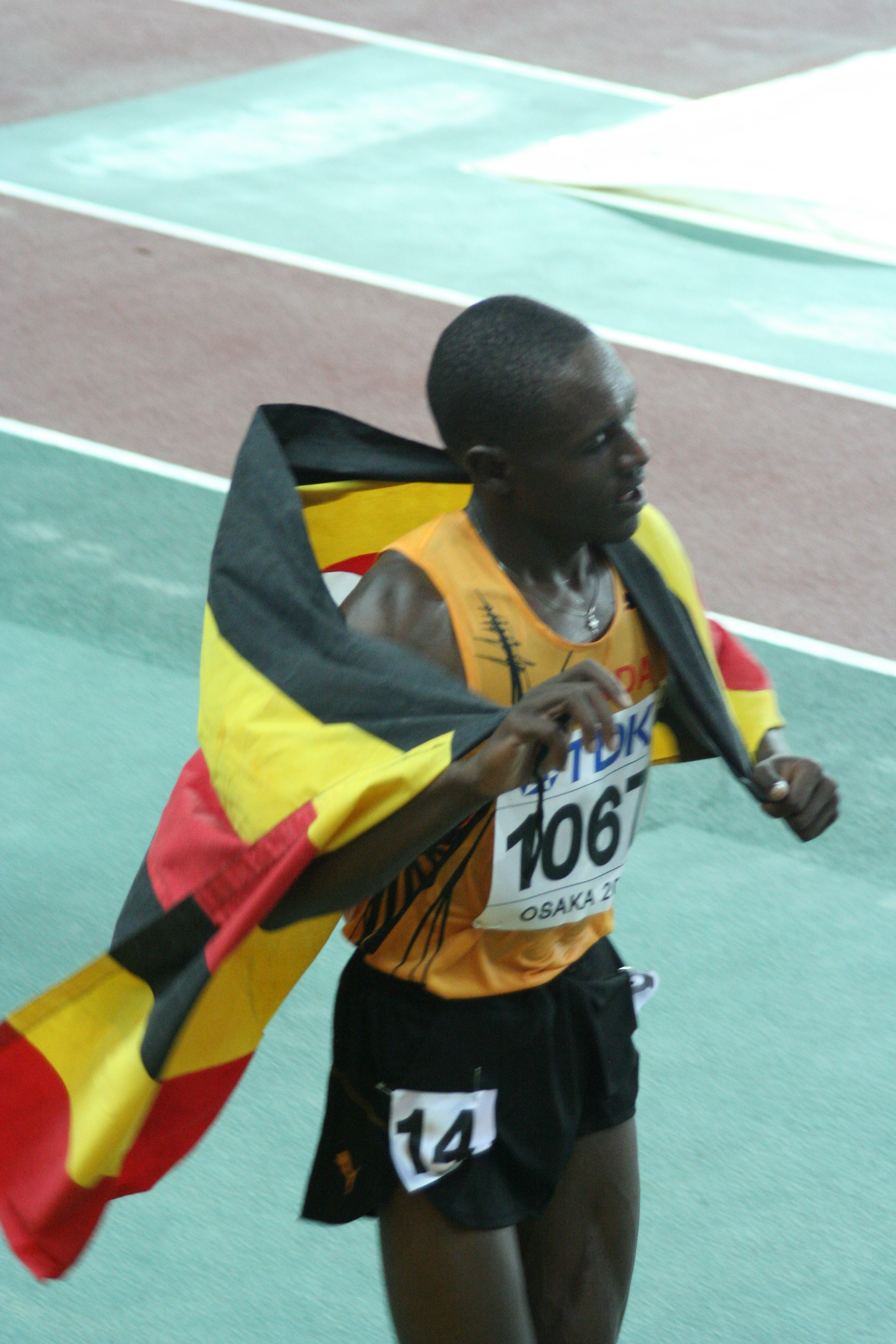
Moses Kipsiro was the runner-up in the men's race.

Complete results for senior men and for senior men's teams were published.

Individual race
Rank	Athlete	Country	Time (m:s)
Gold medal	Gebre-egziabher Gebremariam	Ethiopia	35:02
Silver medal	Moses Kipsiro	Uganda	35:04
Bronze medal	Zersenay Tadese	Eritrea	35:04
4	Leonard Komon	Kenya	35:05
5	Habtamu Fikadu	Ethiopia	35:06
6	Mathew Kisorio	Kenya	35:08
7	Mark Kiptoo	Kenya	35:11
8	Chakir Boujattaoui	Morocco	35:12
9	Teklemariam Medhin	Eritrea	35:14
10	Hunegnaw Mesfin	Ethiopia	35:16
11	Moses Mosop	Kenya	35:17
12	Feyisa Lilesa	Ethiopia	35:22
Full results

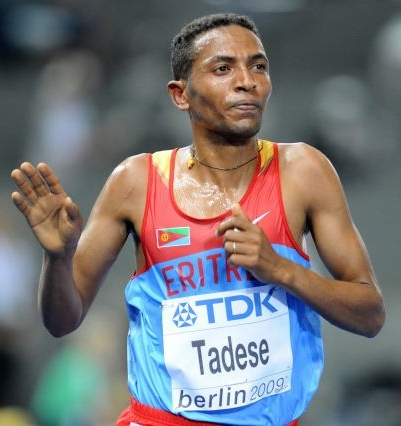
Zersenay Tadese took individual and team bronze medals for Eritrea.

Teams
Rank	Team	Points
Gold medal	Kenya: Leonard Patrick Komon / 4; Mathew Kipkoech Kisorio / 6; Mark Kosgey Kiptoo / 7; Moses Cheruiyot Mosop / 11; (Mangata Kimai Ndiwa) / (14); (Linus Kipwambok Chumba) / (25)	28
Silver medal	Ethiopia: Gebre-egziabher Gebremariam / 1; Habtamu Fikadu / 5; Hunegnaw Mesfin / 10; Feyisa Lilesa / 12; (Dino Sefir) / (15); (Tadese Tola) / (17)	28
Bronze medal	Eritrea: Zersenay Tadese / 3; Teklemariam Medhin / 9; Samuel Tsegay / 16; Samson Kiflemariam / 22; (Issak Sibhatu) / (24); (Kidane Tadasse) / (56)	50
4	Uganda	65
5	Qatar	79
6	Morocco	107
7	Spain	140
8	United States	168
Full results

- Note: Athletes in parentheses did not score for the team result.

=== Junior men's race (8 km) ===
Complete results for junior men and for junior men's teams were published.

Individual race
Rank	Athlete	Country	Time
1st place, gold medalist(s)	Ayele Abshero	Ethiopia	23:26
2nd place, silver medalist(s)	Titus Kipjumba Mbishei	Kenya	23:30
3rd place, bronze medalist(s)	Moses Kibet	Uganda	23:35
4	Paul Kipngetich Tanui	Kenya	23:35
5	Japheth Kipyegon Korir	Kenya	23:36
6	Atalay Yirsaw	Ethiopia	23:38
7	Gashaw Biftu	Ethiopia	23:44
8	Debebe Woldsenbet	Ethiopia	23:52
9	John Kipkoech	Kenya	24:00
10	John Kemboi Cheruiyot	Kenya	24:08
11	German Fernandez	United States	24:13
12	Dieudonné Nsengiyuma	Burundi	24:16
Full results

Teams
Rank	Team	Points
1st place, gold medalist(s)	Kenya: Titus Kipjumba Mbishei / 2; Paul Kipngetich Tanui / 4; Japheth Kipyegon Korir / 5; John Kipkoech / 9; (John Kemboi Cheruiyot) / (10); (Charles Kibet Chepkurui) / (13)	20
2nd place, silver medalist(s)	Ethiopia: Ayele Abshero / 1; Atalay Yirsaw / 6; Gashaw Biftu / 7; Debebe Woldsenbet / 8; (Legese Lamiso) / (16); (Yetwale Kende) / (32)	22
3rd place, bronze medalist(s)	Eritrea: Goitom Kifle / 14; Mulue Andom / 18; Nassir Dawud / 19; Merhawi Tadesse / 21; (Gebrebrhan Tesfamariam) / (33); (Abraham Tewelde) / (34)	72
4	Uganda	82
5	United States	104
6	Australia	135
7	Morocco	143
8	Japan	153
Full results

- Note: Athletes in parentheses did not score for the team result.

=== Senior women's race (8 km) ===
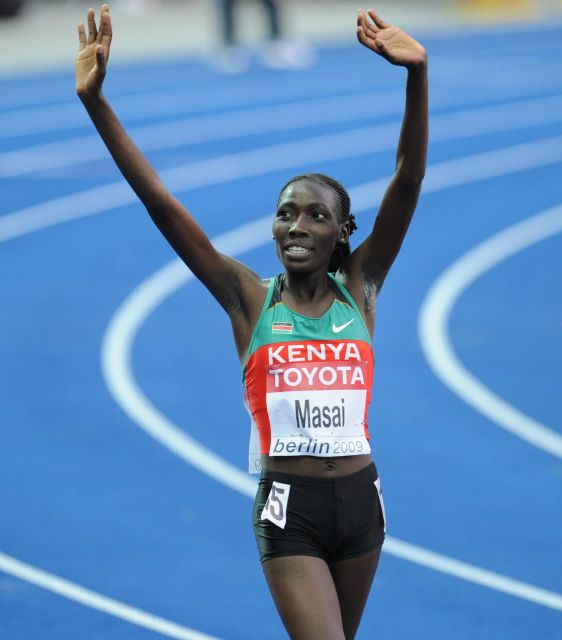
Linet Masai took the silver medal for Kenya.

Complete results for senior women and for senior women's teams were published.

Individual race
Rank	Athlete	Country	Time (m:s)
Gold medal	Florence Kiplagat	Kenya	26:13
Silver medal	Linet Masai	Kenya	26:16
Bronze medal	Meselech Melkamu	Ethiopia	26:19
4	Lineth Chepkurui	Kenya	26:23
5	Wude Ayalew	Ethiopia	26:23
6	Hilda Kibet	Netherlands	26:43
7	Ann Karindi Mwangi	Kenya	26:49
8	Gelete Burka	Ethiopia	26:58
9	Maryam Yusuf Jamal	Bahrain	27:00
10	Ines Chenonge	Kenya	27:00
11	Pauline Korikwiang	Kenya	27:03
12	Mamitu Daska	Ethiopia	27:04
Full results

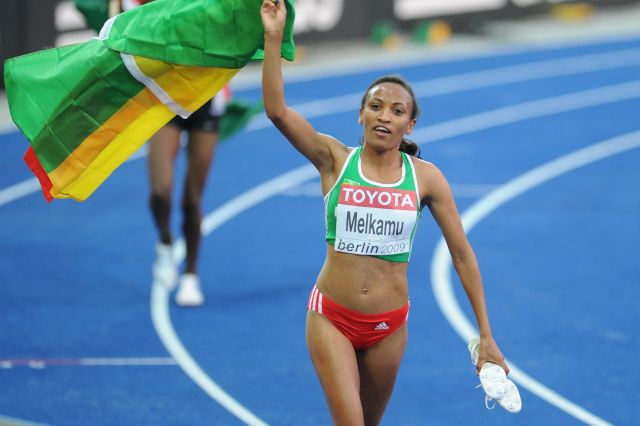
Bronze medallist Meselech Melkamu led Ethiopia to the team silver medal.

Teams
Rank	Team	Points
Gold medal	Kenya: Florence Jebet Kiplagat / 1; Linet Chepkwemoi Masai / 2; Lineth Chepkurui / 4; Ann Karindi Mwangi / 7; (Iness Chepkesis Chenonge) / (10); (Pauline Chemning Korikwiang) / (11)	14
Silver medal	Ethiopia: Meselech Melkamu / 3; Wude Ayalew / 5; Gelete Burka / 8; Mamitu Daska / 12; (Sentayehu Ejigu) / (14); (Koren Jelela) / (30)	28
Bronze medal	Portugal: Ana Dulce Félix / 15; Sara Moreira / 16; Ana Dias / 19; Anália Rosa / 22; (Elisabete Lopes) / (64); (Inês Monteiro) / (DNF)	72
4	Spain	117
5	United States	130
6	Morocco	130
7	Australia	154
8	Japan	165
Full results

- Note: Athletes in parentheses did not score for the team result.

=== Junior women's race (6 km) ===
Complete results for junior women and for junior women's teams were published.

Individual race
Rank	Athlete	Country	Time
1st place, gold medalist(s)	Genzebe Dibaba	Ethiopia	20:14
2nd place, silver medalist(s)	Mercy Cherono	Kenya	20:17
3rd place, bronze medalist(s)	Jackline Chepngeno	Kenya	20:27
4	Frehiwat Goshu	Ethiopia	20:34
5	Nelly Chebet Ngeiywo	Kenya	20:36
6	Sule Utura	Ethiopia	20:38
7	Emebet Anteneh	Ethiopia	20:42
8	Hilda Chepkemoi Tanui	Kenya	20:49
9	Meseret Mengistu	Ethiopia	20:52
10	Jackline Chebii	Kenya	21:01
11	Emily Brichacek	Australia	21:02
12	Tsega Gelaw	Ethiopia	21:11
Full results

Teams
Rank	Team	Points
1st place, gold medalist(s)	Ethiopia: Genzebe Dibaba / 1; Frehiwat Goshu / 4; Sule Utura / 6; Emebet Anteneh / 7; (Meseret Mengistu) / (9); (Tsega Gelaw) / (12)	18
2nd place, silver medalist(s)	Kenya: Mercy Cherono / 2; Jackline Chepngeno / 3; Nelly Chebet Ngeiywo / 5; Hilda Chepkemoi Tanui / 8; (Jackline Chebii) / (10); (Delvine Relin Meringor) / (16)	18
3rd place, bronze medalist(s)	Japan: Nanaka Izawa / 17; Erika Ikeda / 18; Asami Kato / 20; Aki Otagiri / 21; (Chitose Shibata) / (22); (Emi Kameyama) / (37)	76
4	United Kingdom	83
5	United States	124
6	Eritrea	132
7	Australia	157
8	Russia	182
Full results

- Note: Athletes in parentheses did not score for the team result.

== Medal table (unofficial) ==
Rank	Nation	Gold	Silver	Bronze	Total
1	Kenya	4	4	1	9
2	Ethiopia	4	3	1	8
3	Uganda	0	1	1	2
4	Eritrea	0	0	3	3
5	Japan	0	0	1	1
5	Portugal	0	0	1	1
Totals (6 entries)		8	8	8	24

- Note: Totals include both individual and team medals, with medals in the team competition counting as one medal.

== Participation ==
According to an unofficial count, 459 athletes from 59 countries participated, two athletes less (senior women) than the official number published

- Algeria (14)
- Argentina (2)
- Armenia (1)
- Australia (18)
- Azerbaijan (1)
- Bahrain (8)
- Belarus (1)
- Belgium (1)
- Botswana (4)
- Brazil (10)
- Burundi (7)
- Canada (21)
- China (6)
- Dominican Republic (1)
- Egypt (6)
- Eritrea (23)
- Ethiopia (24)
- Finland (1)
- France (10)
- Georgia (2)
- Germany (1)
- Greece (1)
- Iraq (4)
- Ireland (2)
- Italy (6)
- Japan (23)
- Jordan (18)
- Kenya (24)
- Kuwait (4)
- Kyrgyzstan (1)
- Libya (4)
- Malawi (2)
- Morocco (24)
- Netherlands (1)
- New Zealand (2)
- Norway (1)
- Oman (1)
- Palestine (2)
- Peru (1)
- Poland (2)
- Portugal (14)
- Qatar (6)
- Russia (7)
- Rwanda (8)
- Saudi Arabia (2)
- Seychelles (1)
- South Africa (23)
- Spain (19)
- Sudan (6)
- Syria (2)
- Tajikistan (2)
- Tanzania (6)
- Tunisia (10)
- Uganda (11)
- United Kingdom (24)
- United States (23)
- Venezuela (2)
- Yemen (5)
- Zambia (3)

== See also ==
- 2009 IAAF World Cross Country Championships – Senior men's race
- 2009 IAAF World Cross Country Championships – Junior men's race
- 2009 IAAF World Cross Country Championships – Senior women's race
- 2009 IAAF World Cross Country Championships – Junior women's race
- 2009 in athletics (track and field)
