= 2010 IAAF World Cross Country Championships – Senior women's race =

Senior women's race at the 2010 IAAF World Cross Country Championships
- Organisers: IAAF
- Edition: 38th
- Date: March 28
- Host city: Bydgoszcz, Województwo kujawsko-pomorskie, Poland
- Venue: Myślęcinek Park
- Events: 1
- Distances: 7.759 km – Senior women
- Participation: 86 athletes from 27 nations

The Senior women's race at the 2010 IAAF World Cross Country Championships was held at the Myślęcinek Park in Bydgoszcz, Poland, on March 28, 2010. Reports of the event were given in the Herald and for the IAAF.

Complete results for individuals, and for teams were published.

== Race results ==
=== Senior women's race (7.759 km) ===
==== Individual ====
Rank	Athlete	Country	Time
1st place, gold medalist(s)	Emily Chebet	Kenya	24:19
2nd place, silver medalist(s)	Linet Chepkwemoi Masai	Kenya	24:20
3rd place, bronze medalist(s)	Meselech Melkamu	Ethiopia	24:26
4	Tirunesh Dibaba	Ethiopia	24:38
5	Lineth Chepkurui	Kenya	24:40
6	Margaret Wangari Muriuki	Kenya	24:42
7	Feyse Tadese	Ethiopia	25:03
8	Mamitu Daska	Ethiopia	25:03
9	Werknesh Kidane	Ethiopia	25:07
10	Hilda Kibet	Netherlands	25:17
11	Shitaye Eshete	Bahrain	25:20
12	Shalane Flanagan	United States	25:20
13	Hannah Wanjiru Gatheru	Kenya	25:35
14	Gladys Jepkemoi Chemweno	Kenya	25:39
15	Lebogang Phalula	South Africa	25:43
16	Mimi Belete	Bahrain	25:47
17	Benita Willis	Australia	25:56
18	Abebech Afework	Ethiopia	25:58
19	Molly Huddle	United States	25:59
20	Magdalena Lewy-Boulet	United States	26:01
21	Jéssica Augusto	Portugal	26:02
22	Dina Lebo Phalula	South Africa	26:05
23	Stephanie Twell	United Kingdom	26:11
24	Elena Romagnolo	Italy	26:17
25	Amy Hastings	United States	26:20
26	Siham Hilali	Morocco	26:21
27	Sara Moreira	Portugal	26:22
28	Salima El Ouali Alami	Morocco	26:28
29	Rosa Morató	Spain	26:29
30	Risa Takenaka	Japan	26:29
31	Hitomi Niiya	Japan	26:30
32	Lara Tamsett	Australia	26:34
33	Faye Fullerton	United Kingdom	26:36
34	Btissam Lakhouad	Morocco	26:41
35	Anália Rosa	Portugal	26:43
36	Katarzyna Kowalska	Poland	26:45
37	Freya Murray	United Kingdom	26:45
38	Renee Metivier Baillie	United States	26:48
39	Bouchra Chaâbi	Morocco	26:48
40	Alessandra Aguilar	Spain	26:52
41	Emily Brown	United States	26:53
42	Fatima Yvelain	France	26:57
43	Yuko Mizuguchi	Japan	26:57
44	Ana Dias	Portugal	26:58
45	Oneile Dintwe	Botswana	26:58
46	Kazue Kojima	Japan	26:59
47	Stevie Stockton	United Kingdom	27:01
48	Eloise Wellings	Australia	27:05
49	Yuko Shimizu	Japan	27:07
50	Christine Bardelle	France	27:09
51	Asmae Ghizlane	Morocco	27:11
52	Jacqueline Martín	Spain	27:12
53	Nanako Hayashi	Japan	27:13
54	Judith Plá	Spain	27:23
55	Gezashign Safarova	Azerbaijan	27:25
56	Hanane Ouhaddou	Morocco	27:29
57	Safa Aissaoui	Tunisia	27:30
58	Anna Thompson	Australia	27:31
59	Gema Barrachina	Spain	27:32
60	Daniela Cunha	Portugal	27:34
61	Agnieszka Ciolek	Poland	27:40
62	Vanessa Fernandes	Portugal	27:42
63	Hayley Yelling	United Kingdom	27:45
64	Aleksandra Jawor	Poland	27:45
65	Aster Tesfaye	Bahrain	27:46
66	Ronel Thomas	South Africa	27:53
67	Anayelli Navarro	Mexico	27:53
68	Ntombesintu Mfunzi	South Africa	27:53
69	Linda Byrne	Ireland	27:56
70	Agnieszka Jerzyk	Poland	28:08
71	Lishan Dula	Bahrain	28:16
72	Marelise Retief	South Africa	28:17
73	Lu Minhong	China	28:19
74	Rachel Kingsford	New Zealand	28:20
75	Ding Changqin	China	28:32
76	Iwona Lewandowska	Poland	28:44
77	Tebogo Masehla	South Africa	28:46
78	Fatma Lanouar	Tunisia	28:46
79	Tamara Carvolth	Australia	28:49
80	Hao Xiaofan	China	29:13
81	Anna Pyatkina	Kazakhstan	29:36
82	Silviya Danekova	Bulgaria	30:00
83	Simone Zapha	Seychelles	34:51
84	Nadima Mirzoeva	Tajikistan	36:12
—	Karoline Bjerkeli Grøvdal	Norway	DNF
—	Mariola Konowalska	Poland	DNF

==== Teams ====
Rank	Team	Points
1st place, gold medalist(s)	Kenya: Emily Chebet / 1; Linet Chepkwemoi Masai / 2; Lineth Chepkurui / 5; Margaret Wangari Muriuki / 6; (Hannah Wanjiru Gatheru) / (13); (Gladys Jepkemoi Chemweno) / (14)	14
2nd place, silver medalist(s)	Ethiopia: Meselech Melkamu / 3; Tirunesh Dibaba / 4; Feyse Tadese / 7; Mamitu Daska / 8; (Werknesh Kidane) / (9); (Abebech Afework) / (18)	22
3rd place, bronze medalist(s)	United States: Shalane Flanagan / 12; Molly Huddle / 19; Magdalena Lewy-Boulet / 20; Amy Hastings / 25; (Renee Metivier Baillie) / (38); (Emily Brown) / (41)	76
4	Morocco: Siham Hilali / 26; Salima El Ouali Alami / 28; Btissam Lakhouad / 34; Bouchra Chaâbi / 39; (Asmae Ghizlane) / (51); (Hanane Ouhaddou) / (56)	127
5	Portugal: Jéssica Augusto / 21; Sara Moreira / 27; Anália Rosa / 35; Ana Dias / 44; (Daniela Cunha) / (60); (Vanessa Fernandes) / (62)	127
6	United Kingdom: Stephanie Twell / 23; Faye Fullerton / 33; Freya Murray / 37; Stevie Stockton / 47; (Hayley Yelling) / (63)	140
7	Japan: Risa Takenaka / 30; Hitomi Niiya / 31; Yuko Mizuguchi / 43; Kazue Kojima / 46; (Yuko Shimizu) / (49); (Nanako Hayashi) / (53)	150
8	Australia: Benita Willis / 17; Lara Tamsett / 32; Eloise Wellings / 48; Anna Thompson / 58; (Tamara Carvolth) / (79)	155
9	Bahrain: Shitaye Eshete / 11; Mimi Belete / 16; Aster Tesfaye / 65; Lishan Dula / 71	163
10	South Africa: Lebogang Phalula / 15; Dina Lebo Phalula / 22; Ronel Thomas / 66; Ntombesintu Mfunzi / 68; (Marelise Retief) / (72); (Tebogo Masehla) / (77)	171
11	Spain: Rosa Morató / 29; Alessandra Aguilar / 40; Jacqueline Martín / 52; Judith Plá / 54; (Gema Barrachina) / (59)	175
12	Poland: Katarzyna Kowalska / 36; Agnieszka Ciolek / 61; Aleksandra Jawor / 64; Agnieszka Jerzyk / 70; (Iwona Lewandowska) / (76); (Mariola Konowalska) / (DNF)	231

- Note: Athletes in parentheses did not score for the team result.

== Participation ==
According to an unofficial count, 86 athletes from 27 countries participated in the Senior women's race. This is in agreement with the official numbers as published.

- Australia (5)
- Azerbaijan (1)
- Bahrain (4)
- Botswana (1)
- Bulgaria (1)
- China (3)
- Ethiopia (6)
- France (2)
- Ireland (1)
- Italy (1)
- Japan (6)
- Kazakhstan (1)
- Kenya (6)
- Mexico (1)
- Morocco (6)
- Netherlands (1)
- New Zealand (1)
- Norway (1)
- Poland (6)
- Portugal (6)
- Seychelles (1)
- South Africa (6)
- Spain (5)
- Tajikistan (1)
- Tunisia (2)
- United Kingdom (5)
- United States (6)

== See also ==
- 2010 IAAF World Cross Country Championships – Senior men's race
- 2010 IAAF World Cross Country Championships – Junior men's race
- 2010 IAAF World Cross Country Championships – Junior women's race
