= 2010 IAAF World Cross Country Championships – Senior men's race =

Senior men's race at the 2010 IAAF World Cross Country Championships
- Organisers: IAAF
- Edition: 38th
- Date: March 28
- Host city: Bydgoszcz, Województwo kujawsko-pomorskie, Poland
- Venue: Myślęcinek Park
- Events: 1
- Distances: 11.611 km – Senior men
- Participation: 135 athletes from 39 nations

The Senior men's race at the 2010 IAAF World Cross Country Championships was held at the Myślęcinek Park in Bydgoszcz, Poland, on March 28, 2010. Reports of the event were given in the Herald, and for the IAAF.

Complete results for individuals, and for teams were published. Updates were made to the original rankings of the senior men's race due to doping disqualifications of two Moroccan athletes.

== Race results ==
=== Senior men's race (11.611 km) ===
==== Individual ====
Rank	Athlete	Country	Time
1st place, gold medalist(s)	Joseph Ebuya	Kenya	33:00
2nd place, silver medalist(s)	Teklemariam Medhin	Eritrea	33:06
3rd place, bronze medalist(s)	Moses Ndiema Kipsiro	Uganda	33:10
4	Leonard Patrick Komon	Kenya	33:10
5	Samuel Tsegay	Eritrea	33:27
6	Hasan Mahboob	Bahrain	33:28
7	Richard Kipkemboi Mateelong	Kenya	33:29
8	Paul Kipngetich Tanui	Kenya	33:30
9	Hosea Mwok Macharinyang	Kenya	33:31
10	Gebregziabher Gebremariam	Ethiopia	33:35
11	Ahmad Hassan Abdullah	Qatar	33:36
12	Simon Bairu	Canada	33:44
13	Alemayehu Bezabeh	Spain	33:47
14	Kidane Tadasse	Eritrea	33:50
15	Geofrey Kusuro	Uganda	33:54
16	Abera Kuma	Ethiopia	33:55
17	Anis Selmouni	Morocco	33:58
18	Lucas Kimeli Rotich	Kenya	33:58
19	Hunegnaw Mesfin	Ethiopia	34:01
20	Mo Farah	Great Britain	34:09
21	Azmeraw Bekele	Ethiopia	34:21
22	Stephen Mokoka	South Africa	34:23
23	Kiflom Sium	Eritrea	34:24
24	Ayele Abshero	Ethiopia	34:27
25	Feyisa Lilesa	Ethiopia	34:27
26	Driss El Himer	France	34:27
27	Dickson Huru	Uganda	34:35
28	El Houssaine Dham	Morocco	34:37
29	Fabiano Joseph Naasi	Tanzania	34:38
30	Alemu Bekele	Bahrain	34:39
31	Carles Castillejo	Spain	34:40
32	Gitimi Shamba	Tanzania	34:41
33	Tesfayohannes Mesfin	Eritrea	34:48
34	Patrick Smyth	United States	34:51
35	Abderrahim El Asri	Morocco	34:54
36	Liam Adams	Australia	34:55
37	Tewelde Estifanos	Eritrea	34:57
38	Abdellatif Meftah	France	35:00
39	Martin Hhaway Sulle	Tanzania	35:01
40	Yousef El Kalai	Portugal	35:02
41	Ben Siwa	Uganda	35:03
42	Andrew Vernon	Great Britain	35:03
43	Ryan Vail	United States	35:04
44	Kaddour Slimani	Italy	35:04
45	Miguel Barzola	Argentina	35:06
46	Robert Curtis	United States	35:08
47	Bilisuma Shugi	Bahrain	35:10
48	Felix Kikwai Kibore	Qatar	35:11
49	Ayad Lamdassem	Spain	35:12
50	Lungisa Mdedelwa	South Africa	35:12
51	Scott Bauhs	United States	35:14
52	Gamal Belal Salem	Qatar	35:14
53	Hassan Hirt	France	35:14
54	Alberto Lozano	Spain	35:18
55	Marco Joseph	Tanzania	35:20
56	Fernando Silva	Portugal	35:21
57	James Kibet	Uganda	35:24
58	Licinio Pimentel	Portugal	35:26
59	Sibabalwe Mzazi	South Africa	35:26
60	Kgosi Tsosane	South Africa	35:28
61	Juan Luis Barrios	Mexico	35:29
62	Saïd Berioui	France	35:31
63	Michael Skinner	Great Britain	35:31
64	Denis Mayaud	France	35:34
65	Robert Mack	United States	35:36
66	Antonio David Jiménez	Spain	35:38
67	Manuel Damião	Portugal	35:39
68	Clinton Perrett	Australia	35:39
69	Xolisa Tyali	South Africa	35:40
70	Stéphane Joly	Switzerland	35:41
71	Essa Ismail Rashed	Qatar	35:44
72	Gilberto Lopes	Brazil	35:44
73	Hélder Ornelas	Portugal	35:48
74	Tetsuya Yoroizaka	Japan	35:48
75	Arkadiusz Gardzielewski	Poland	35:48
76	Hiroyoshi Umegae	Japan	35:51
77	Martin Toroitich	Uganda	35:52
78	Ben Bruce	United States	35:56
79	Javier Guerra	Spain	35:57
80	Takuya Noguchi	Japan	36:02
81	Tasama Moogas	Israel	36:07
82	Collis Birmingham	Australia	36:09
83	Dejene Regassa	Bahrain	36:09
84	Joílson da Silva	Brazil	36:11
85	Edwin Henshaw	New Zealand	36:12
86	Ramolefi Motsieloa	Lesotho	36:14
87	Kaelo Mosalagae	Botswana	36:15
88	Kamil Poczwardowski	Poland	36:16
89	Martin Dematteis	Italy	36:16
90	Andrew Davidson	New Zealand	36:19
91	Tsubasa Hayakawa	Japan	36:19
92	Stéphane Lefrand	France	36:21
93	Atelaw Yeshetela	Belgium	36:22
94	Kazuya Deguchi	Japan	36:23
95	Atef Saad	Tunisia	36:29
96	Shaun Krawitz	New Zealand	36:30
97	Sérgio Da Silva	Brazil	36:35
98	Jeff Hunt	Australia	36:37
99	Minato Oishi	Japan	36:46
100	El Akhdar Hachani	Tunisia	36:46
101	Juan Carlos Carera	Mexico	36:51
102	Methkal Abu Drais	Jordan	36:58
103	Blazej Brzezinski	Poland	37:03
104	Josafat Gonzaléz	Mexico	37:08
105	James Wilkinson	Great Britain	37:10
106	Krystian Zalewski	Poland	37:11
107	Jaroslaw Cichocki	Poland	37:14
108	Tilahun Aliyev	Azerbaijan	37:17
109	Kim Hogarth	New Zealand	37:19
110	Ramoseka Raobine	Botswana	37:36
111	Wissem Hosni	Tunisia	37:41
112	Rapula Diphoko	Botswana	37:45
113	Takhir Mamashayev	Kazakhstan	37:50
114	Tadeusz Zblewski	Poland	38:10
115	Vjatseslav Koselev	Estonia	38:14
116	Siyabonga Nkonde	South Africa	38:21
117	Leonardo Vieira Guedes	Brazil	39:17
118	Sotyvoldy Khaitov	Tajikistan	39:19
119	Gaylord Silly	Seychelles	39:45
120	Mahmood Alrashedi	Iraq	39:46
121	Pablo Olmedo	Mexico	39:47
122	Sadeq Jaafar Lafta	Iraq	40:43
123	Hussein Mohammed Subaihawi	Iraq	40:45
124	Noori Al-Darraji	Iraq	41:29
125	Richard Blagg	Gibraltar	46:24
—	Mohammed Abduh Bakhet	Qatar	DNF
—	Gilmar Lopes	Brazil	DNF
—	Javier Carriqueo	Argentina	DNF
—	Sylvain Rukundo	Rwanda	DNF
—	José Rocha	Portugal	DNF
—	Duer Yoa	Australia	DNF
—	Mohamed Isak	Somalia	DNF
—	Hicham Bellani	Morocco	DNF
—	Chakir Boujattaoui	Morocco	DQ^{†}
—	Ahmed Baday	Morocco	DQ^{†}
—	Ali Dawoud Sedam	Qatar	DNS

^{†}: Chakir Boujattaoui of Morocco was the original 12th-place finisher in 33:42 min, but was disqualified for a doping offence. His teammate Ahmed Baday, originally 29th before Boujattaoui's ban, was later disqualified for doping as well, which resulted in the removal of Morocco from the team rankings as it failed to have four valid finishers.

==== Teams ====
Rank	Team	Points
1st place, gold medalist(s)	Kenya: Joseph Ebuya / 1; Leonard Patrick Komon / 4; Richard Kipkemboi Mateelong / 7; Paul Kipngetich Tanui / 8; (Hosea Mwok Macharinyang) / (9); (Lucas Kimeli Rotich) / (18)	20
2nd place, silver medalist(s)	Eritrea: Teklemariam Medhin / 2; Samuel Tsegay / 5; Kidane Tadasse / 14; Kiflom Sium / 23; (Tesfayohannes Mesfin) / (33); (Tewelde Estifanos) / (37)	44
3rd place, bronze medalist(s)	Ethiopia: Gebregziabher Gebremariam / 10; Abera Kuma / 16; Hunegnaw Mesfin / 19; Azmeraw Bekele / 21; (Ayele Abshero) / (24); (Feyisa Lilesa) / (25)	66
4	Uganda: Moses Ndiema Kipsiro / 3; Geofrey Kusuro / 15; Dickson Huru / 27; Ben Siwa / 41; (James Kibet) / (57); (Martin Toroitich) / (77)	86
5	Spain: Alemayehu Bezabeh / 13; Carles Castillejo / 31; Ayad Lamdassem / 49; Alberto Lozano / 54; (Antonio David Jiménez) / (66); (Javier Guerra) / (79)	147
6	Tanzania: Fabiano Joseph Naasi / 29; Gitimi Shamba / 32; Martin Hhaway Sulle / 39; Marco Joseph / 55	155
7	Bahrain: Hasan Mahboob / 6; Alemu Bekele / 30; Bilisuma Shugi / 47; Dejene Regassa / 82	165
8	United States: Patrick Smyth / 34; Ryan Vail / 43; Robert Curtis / 46; Scott Bauhs / 51; (Robert Mack) / (67); (Ben Bruce) / (78)	174
9	France: Driss El Himer / 26; Abdellatif Meftah / 38; Hassan Hirt / 53; Saïd Berioui / 62; (Denis Mayaud) / (64); (Stéphane Lefrand) / (92)	179
11	Qatar: Ahmad Hassan Abdullah / 11; Felix Kikwai Kibore / 48; Gamal Belal Salem / 52; Essa Ismail Rashed / 71; (Mohammed Abduh Bakhet) / (DNF)	182
12	South Africa: Stephen Mokoka / 22; Lungisa Mdedelwa / 50; Sibabalwe Mzazi / 59; Kgosi Tsosane / 60; (Xolisa Tyali) / (69); (Siyabonga Nkonde) / (116)	191
13	Portugal: Yousef El Kalai / 40; Fernando Silva / 56; Licinio Pimentel / 58; Manuel Damião / 67; (Hélder Ornelas) / (73); (José Rocha) / (DNF)	221
14	Great Britain: Mo Farah / 20; Andrew Vernon / 42; Michael Skinner / 63; James Wilkinson / 105	230
15	Australia: Liam Adams / 36; Clinton Perrett / 68; Collis Birmingham / 82; Jeff Hunt / 98; (Duer Yoa) / (DNF)	284
16	Japan: Tetsuya Yoroizaka / 74; Hiroyoshi Umegae / 76; Takuya Noguchi / 80; Tsubasa Hayakawa / 91; (Kazuya Deguchi) / (94); (Minato Oishi) / (99)	321
17	Brazil: Gilberto Lopes / 72; Joílson da Silva / 84; Sérgio Da Silva / 97; Leonardo Vieira Guedes / 117; (Gilmar Lopes) / (DNF)	370
18	Poland: Arkadiusz Gardzielewski / 75; Kamil Poczwardowski / 88; Blazej Brzezinski / 103; Krystian Zalewski / 106; (Jaroslaw Cichocki) / (107); (Tadeusz Zblewski) / (114)	372
19	New Zealand: Edwin Henshaw / 85; Andrew Davidson / 90; Shaun Krawitz / 96; Kim Hogarth / 109	380
20	Mexico: Juan Luis Barrios / 61; Juan Carlos Carera / 101; Josafat Gonzaléz / 104; Pablo Olmedo / 121	387
21	Iraq: Mahmood Alrashedi / 120; Sadeq Jaafar Lafta / 122; Hussein Mohammed Subaihawi / 123; Noori Al-Darraji / 124	489
DQ	Morocco: Anis Selmouni / 17; El Houssaine Dham / 29; Abderrahim El Asri / 36; (Hicham Bellani) / (DNF); Chakir Boujattaoui / DQ (12); Ahmed Baday / DQ (29)	n/a^{†}

- Note: Athletes in parentheses did not score for the team result.

== Participation ==
According to an unofficial count, 135 athletes from 39 countries participated in the senior men's race. This is in agreement with the official numbers as published.

- Argentina (2)
- Australia (5)
- Azerbaijan (1)
- Bahrain (4)
- Belgium (1)
- Botswana (3)
- Brazil (5)
- Canada (1)
- Eritrea (6)
- Estonia (1)
- Ethiopia (6)
- France (6)
- Gibraltar (1)
- Iraq (4)
- Israel (1)
- Italy (2)
- Japan (6)
- Jordan (1)
- Kazakhstan (1)
- Kenya (6)
- Lesotho (1)
- Mexico (4)
- Morocco (6)
- New Zealand (4)
- Poland (6)
- Portugal (6)
- Qatar (5)
- Rwanda (1)
- Seychelles (1)
- Somalia (1)
- South Africa (6)
- Spain (6)
- Switzerland (1)
- Tajikistan (1)
- Tanzania (4)
- Tunisia (3)
- Uganda (6)
- Great Britain (4)
- United States (6)

== See also ==
- 2010 IAAF World Cross Country Championships – Junior men's race
- 2010 IAAF World Cross Country Championships – Senior women's race
- 2010 IAAF World Cross Country Championships – Junior women's race
