= 2010 IAAF World Cross Country Championships – Junior women's race =

Junior women's race at the 2010 IAAF World Cross Country Championships
- Organisers: IAAF
- Edition: 38th
- Date: March 28
- Host city: Bydgoszcz, Województwo kujawsko-pomorskie, Poland
- Venue: Myślęcinek Park
- Events: 1
- Distances: 5.833 km – Junior women
- Participation: 95 athletes from 26 nations

The Junior women's race at the 2010 IAAF World Cross Country Championships was held at the Myślęcinek Park in Bydgoszcz, Poland, on March 28, 2010. Reports of the event were given in the Herald and for the IAAF.

Complete results for individuals, and for teams were published.

== Race results ==
=== Junior women's race (5.833 km) ===
==== Individual ====
Rank	Athlete	Country	Time
1st place, gold medalist(s)	Mercy Cherono	Kenya	18:47
2nd place, silver medalist(s)	Purity Cherotich Rionoripo	Kenya	18:54
3rd place, bronze medalist(s)	Esther Chemtai	Kenya	18:55
4	Faith Chepngetich Kipyegon	Kenya	19:02
5	Genet Yalew	Ethiopia	19:03
6	Emebet Anteneh	Ethiopia	19:06
7	Nelly Chebet Ngeiywo	Kenya	19:06
8	Afera Godfay	Ethiopia	19:07
9	Alice Aprot Nawowuna	Kenya	19:14
10	Tejitu Daba	Bahrain	19:14
11	Genzebe Dibaba	Ethiopia	19:21
12	Merima Mohammed	Ethiopia	19:26
13	Waganesh Mekasha	Ethiopia	19:34
14	Annet Negesa	Uganda	19:44
15	Rebecca Cheptegei	Uganda	19:48
16	Gulshat Fazlitdinova	Russia	19:51
17	Genzeb Shumi	Bahrain	20:08
18	Emily Sisson	United States	20:08
19	Nanaka Izawa	Japan	20:17
20	Kate Avery	United Kingdom	20:17
21	Federica Bevilacqua	Italy	20:21
22	Yuka Ando	Japan	20:22
23	Emelia Gorecka	United Kingdom	20:25
24	Minori Suzuki	Japan	20:26
25	Viola Chemos	Uganda	20:28
26	Idah Phorisa	Botswana	20:31
27	Linet Chebet	Uganda	20:32
28	Nicki Maria McFadzien	New Zealand	20:34
29	Shelby Greany	United States	20:35
30	Annabel Gummow	United Kingdom	20:37
31	Danielle Trevis	New Zealand	20:40
32	Hannah Walker	United Kingdom	20:41
33	Akane Sueyoshi	Japan	20:53
34	Chelsea Graham	Canada	20:54
35	Juliet Bottorff	United States	21:00
36	Beth Potter	United Kingdom	21:04
37	Mercy Chelangat	Uganda	21:05
38	Hadda Souadia	Algeria	21:07
39	Letitia Saayman	South Africa	21:09
40	Caroline Pfister	Canada	21:11
41	Emily Jones	United States	21:12
42	Narjes Issaoui	Tunisia	21:14
43	Karla Diaz	Mexico	21:18
44	Nawal Yahi	Algeria	21:20
45	Sophia Ziemian	United States	21:21
46	Nabila Madoui	Algeria	21:24
47	Chihiro Tanabe	Japan	21:25
48	Paula Kopciewska	Poland	21:27
49	Aleksandra Gierat	Poland	21:27
50	Demi Wood	Australia	21:29
51	Laura Tremblay	United States	21:31
52	Thato Makhafola	South Africa	21:36
53	Ciara Kary	Canada	21:36
54	Safa Jammeli	Tunisia	21:41
55	Olivia Burne	New Zealand	21:41
56	Sarah Inglis	United Kingdom	21:42
57	Eliona Delgado	Peru	21:44
58	Juan-Marie Cooper	South Africa	21:45
59	Estefanía Tobal	Spain	21:48
60	Dina Alexandrova	Russia	21:48
61	Makampong Masaile	Lesotho	21:48
62	Monika Suchar	Poland	21:49
63	Hanna Kalodzich	Belarus	21:50
64	Ashleigh Schnettler	South Africa	21:50
65	Viktoria Ivanova	Russia	21:50
66	Evdokia Bukina	Russia	21:51
67	Anna Ceoloni	Italy	21:56
68	Ana Gutiérrez	Spain	21:58
69	Nabila Sifi	Algeria	21:59
70	Imane Almani	Algeria	22:00
71	Anna Sysoeva	Russia	22:02
72	Léa Plumecocq	France	22:06
73	Grace Thek	Australia	22:06
74	María José Pérez	Spain	22:07
75	Madeleine Davidson	Canada	22:07
76	Izabela Dziedziech	Poland	22:09
77	Cécile Chevillard	France	22:09
78	Marwa Nasri	Tunisia	22:15
79	Tania Carretero	Spain	22:16
80	Lena Placzek	Poland	22:26
81	Sylvia Kedireng Tshetlanyana	South Africa	22:26
82	Estelle Mathias	France	22:29
83	Karley Rempel	Canada	22:34
84	Veronika Mikhaylova	Russia	22:34
85	Paulina Furmanska	Poland	22:37
86	Darya Dedochenko	Kazakhstan	22:46
87	Marjorie Hamelin	France	22:48
88	Hanen Aloui	Tunisia	22:53
89	Samantha Walkow	Canada	23:01
90	Ala'ziad Khalifah	Jordan	23:20
91	Debora Santos	Portugal	23:29
92	Kawthar Hdidi	Tunisia	23:33
93	Amina Derouich	Tunisia	24:17
—	Yuki Hidaka	Japan	DNF
—	Naïma Bakaddour	Algeria	DNF

==== Teams ====
Rank	Team	Points
1st place, gold medalist(s)	Kenya: Mercy Cherono / 1; Purity Cherotich Rionoripo / 2; Esther Chemtai / 3; Faith Chepngetich Kipyegon / 4; (Nelly Chebet Ngeiywo) / (7); (Alice Aprot Nawowuna) / (9)	10
2nd place, silver medalist(s)	Ethiopia: Genet Yalew / 5; Emebet Anteneh / 6; Afera Godfay / 8; Genzebe Dibaba / 11; (Merima Mohammed) / (12); (Waganesh Mekasha) / (13)	30
3rd place, bronze medalist(s)	Uganda: Annet Negesa / 14; Rebecca Cheptegei / 15; Viola Chemos / 25; Linet Chebet / 27; (Mercy Chelangat) / (37)	81
4	Japan: Nanaka Izawa / 19; Yuka Ando / 22; Minori Suzuki / 24; Akane Sueyoshi / 33; (Chihiro Tanabe) / (47); (Yuki Hidaka) / (DNF)	98
5	United Kingdom: Kate Avery / 20; Emelia Gorecka / 23; Annabel Gummow / 30; Hannah Walker / 32; (Beth Potter) / (36); (Sarah Inglis) / (56)	105
6	United States: Emily Sisson / 18; Shelby Greany / 29; Juliet Bottorff / 35; Emily Jones / 41; (Sophia Ziemian) / (45); (Laura Tremblay) / (51)	123
7	Algeria: Hadda Souadia / 38; Nawal Yahi / 44; Nabila Madoui / 46; Nabila Sifi / 69; (Imane Almani) / (70); (Naïma Bakaddour) / (DNF)	197
8	Canada: Chelsea Graham / 34; Caroline Pfister / 40; Ciara Kary / 53; Madeleine Davidson / 75; (Karley Rempel) / (83); (Samantha Walkow) / (89)	202
9	Russia: Gulshat Fazlitdinova / 16; Dina Alexandrova / 60; Viktoria Ivanova / 65; Evdokia Bukina / 66; (Anna Sysoeva) / (71); (Veronika Mikhaylova) / (84)	207
10	South Africa: Letitia Saayman / 39; Thato Makhafola / 52; Juan-Marie Cooper / 58; Ashleigh Schnettler / 64; (Sylvia Kedireng Tshetlanyana) / (81)	213
11	Poland: Paula Kopciewska / 48; Aleksandra Gierat / 49; Monika Suchar / 62; Izabela Dziedziech / 76; (Lena Placzek) / (80); (Paulina Furmanska) / (85)	235
12	Tunisia: Narjes Issaoui / 42; Safa Jammeli / 54; Marwa Nasri / 78; Hanen Aloui / 88; (Kawthar Hdidi) / (92); (Amina Derouich) / (93)	262
13	Spain: Estefanía Tobal / 59; Ana Gutiérrez / 68; María José Pérez / 74; Tania Carretero / 79	280
14	France: Léa Plumecocq / 72; Cécile Chevillard / 77; Estelle Mathias / 82; Marjorie Hamelin / 87	318

- Note: Athletes in parentheses did not score for the team result.

== Participation ==
According to an unofficial count, 95 athletes from 26 countries participated in the Junior women's race. This is in agreement with the official numbers as published.

- Algeria (6)
- Australia (2)
- Bahrain (2)
- Belarus (1)
- Botswana (1)
- Canada (6)
- Ethiopia (6)
- France (4)
- Italy (2)
- Japan (6)
- Jordan (1)
- Kazakhstan (1)
- Kenya (6)
- Lesotho (1)
- Mexico (1)
- New Zealand (3)
- Peru (1)
- Poland (6)
- Portugal (1)
- Russia (6)
- South Africa (5)
- Spain (4)
- Tunisia (6)
- Uganda (5)
- United Kingdom (6)
- United States (6)

== See also ==
- 2010 IAAF World Cross Country Championships – Senior men's race
- 2010 IAAF World Cross Country Championships – Junior men's race
- 2010 IAAF World Cross Country Championships – Senior women's race
