= Tuskys Wareng Cross Country =

The Tuskys Wareng Cross Country is an annual cross country running competition that takes place in November near Eldoret in Kenya. The name is derived from the sponsor, Tuskys Supermarket, which is based in Wareng County.

The event was inaugurated in December 2006 with its soft grassy course located in the Huruma area four kilometres west of the centre of Eldoret (a town renowned for long-distance running). The first edition was known as the Tuskermatt Cross Country, but this changed to its current title the year after. The competition's programme of events comprised two senior races (men's 12 km and women's 8 km) and two junior races (boy's 8 km and girl's 6 km). The competition quickly attracted a high number of top level runners in the region and by 2008 the senior men's race alone garnered some 250 entries. It developed into one of the major Kenyan annual races and Kipchoge Keino, head of Kenyan Olympic Committee, was present that year.

Although the event attracts almost exclusively Kenyan runners, the calibre of the competitors is very high, such is the country's strength internationally. World Cross Country champions Emily Chebet and Vivian Cheruiyot have both won the competition, while the men's side has been won by world half marathon champion Wilson Kiprop, World Cross runner-up Moses Mosop, and World Cross team medallist Hosea Macharinyang. Among those to have won the junior races, Leonard Komon, Mercy Cherono, Daniel Salel and Purity Cherotich Rionoripo have gone on to win World Junior Cross Country medals.

In 2018 cars were awarded to the winners of the competition, marking the first time that a car was provided to the winner of a cross country competition in Kenya.

== Past race winners ==
Edition	Year	Men's winner	Time (m:s)	Women's winner	Time (m:s)	Men's junior winner	Women's junior winner
1st	2006	Moses Kipkosgei Kigen (KEN)	33:12	Fridah Ndomongole (KEN)	21:29	Leonard Komon (KEN)	Gladys Otero (KEN)
2nd	2007	Josephat Kipsang Kirui (KEN)	35:48.5	Gladys Chemweno (KEN)	27:19.6	Josephat Bett (KEN)	Mercy Cherono (KEN)
3rd	2008	Moses Mosop (KEN)	36:34.6	Helah Kiprop (KEN)	28:33.8	Josephat Bett (KEN)	Mercy Cherono (KEN)
4th	2009	Hosea Macharinyang (KEN)	34:16.3	Pamela Lisoreng (KEN)	25:30.7	Daniel Salel (KEN)	Purity Cherotich Rionoripo (KEN)
5th	2010	Lucas Rotich (KEN)	33:34.4	Vivian Cheruiyot (KEN)	25:00.7	Japheth Korir (KEN)	Jepkorir Kipkoech (KEN)
6th	2011	Wilson Kiprop (KEN)	34:51.5	Emily Chebet (KEN)	27:02.6	Gideon Kipketer (KEN)	Agnes Chebet (KEN)
7th	2012	Gideon Kipketer (KEN)	36:04.1	Stacy Ndiwa (KEN)	27:32.7	Kiprono Bett (KEN)	Agnes Chebet (KEN)
8th	2013	Isaac Korir (KEN)	35:50.6	Florence Kiplagat (KEN)	26:34.2	Franklin Ngelel (KEN)	Linah Cheruto (KEN)
9th	2014	Joseph Kitur (KEN)	36:33	Alice Aprot (KEN)	26:58	? (KEN)	? (KEN)
10th	2015	Josphat Bett Kipkoech (KEN)	30:29.2	Alice Aprot (KEN)	26:35.9	Peter Kipserem (KEN)	Sandra Chebet (KEN)
12th	2016	Ronald Kirui (KEN)	28:03.6	Irene Cheptai (KEN)	31:15	Nicholas Kimeli (KEN)	Lilian Kasait (KEN)
13th	2017	Emmanuel Bett (KEN)	30:00.8	Lilian Kasait (KEN)	33:54.4	Robert Kiprop (KEN)	Ednah Jebitok (KEN)
14th	2018	Rhonex Kipruto (KEN)	29:38.1	Agnes Jebet Tirop (KEN)	33:14.5		
