= 2010 IAAF World Cross Country Championships – Junior men's race =

Junior men's race at the 2010 IAAF World Cross Country Championships
- Organisers: IAAF
- Edition: 38th
- Date: March 28
- Host city: Bydgoszcz, Województwo kujawsko-pomorskie, Poland
- Venue: Myślęcinek Park
- Events: 1
- Distances: 7.759 km – Junior men
- Participation: 121 athletes from 29 nations

The Junior men's race at the 2010 IAAF World Cross Country Championships was held at the Myślęcinek Park in Bydgoszcz, Poland, on March 28, 2010. Reports of the event were given in the Herald and for the IAAF.

Complete results for individuals, and for teams were published.

== Race results ==
=== Junior men's race (7.759 km) ===
==== Individual ====
Rank	Athlete	Country	Time
1st place, gold medalist(s)	Caleb Mwangangi Ndiku	Kenya	22:07
2nd place, silver medalist(s)	Clement Kiprono Langat	Kenya	22:09
3rd place, bronze medalist(s)	Japhet Kipyegon Korir	Kenya	22:12
4	Isiah Kiplangat Koech	Kenya	22:24
5	Moses Kibet	Uganda	22:27
6	Debebe Woldsenbet	Ethiopia	22:28
7	Gashaw Biftu	Ethiopia	22:31
8	Gideon Kipkemoi Kipketer	Kenya	22:33
9	Gebretsadik Abraha	Ethiopia	22:37
10	Belete Assefa	Ethiopia	22:41
11	Charles Kibet Chepkurui	Kenya	22:44
12	Nassir Dawud	Eritrea	22:48
13	Timothy Toroitich	Uganda	22:48
14	Yekeber Bayabel	Ethiopia	22:55
15	Goitom Kifle	Eritrea	22:57
16	Mosinet Geremew	Ethiopia	23:00
17	Mulue Andom	Eritrea	23:02
18	Thomas Ayeko	Uganda	23:02
19	Edwin Chebii Kimurer	Bahrain	23:12
20	Alex Cherop	Uganda	23:16
21	Joel Mmone	South Africa	23:17
22	Teklit Teweldebrhan	Eritrea	23:18
23	Samsom Gebreyohannes	Eritrea	23:24
24	Soyekwo Kibet	Uganda	23:24
25	Hicham Sigueni	Morocco	23:28
26	Abdelhadi Labäli	Morocco	23:28
27	Mohammed Ahmed	Canada	23:29
28	Akinobu Murasawa	Japan	23:29
29	Trevor Dunbar	United States	23:36
30	Sityhilo Diko	South Africa	23:40
31	Sondre Nordstad Moen	Norway	23:41
32	Suguru Osako	Japan	23:42
33	Othmane El Goumri	Morocco	23:42
34	Isaac Kemboi Chelimo	Bahrain	23:44
35	Takumi Honda	Japan	23:48
36	Adam Abdelmunaim	Sudan	23:54
37	Abdelmajid El Hissouf	Morocco	23:56
38	Kazuto Nishiike	Japan	24:01
39	Kevin Batt	Australia	24:08
40	Takashi Ichida	Japan	24:09
41	Ronnie Sparke	United Kingdom	24:10
42	Andrew Colley	United States	24:10
43	Abderrahmane Anou	Algeria	24:14
44	Walter Schafer	United States	24:17
45	Indelow Takala	Israel	24:18
46	Rui Pinto	Portugal	24:19
47	Callum Hawkins	United Kingdom	24:21
48	Vuyisile Tshoba	South Africa	24:27
49	Othmane Laaroussi	Morocco	24:31
50	Tom Farrell	United Kingdom	24:33
51	Bryan Cantero	France	24:35
52	Mohammed El Amin Cheouaf	Algeria	24:35
53	Anes Traikia	Algeria	24:36
54	Andrew Kimpel	United States	24:37
55	Michele Fontana	Italy	24:38
56	Aitor Fernández	Spain	24:40
57	Diego Bautista	Mexico	24:40
58	Pieter Jacobus Wilders	South Africa	24:40
59	John Travers	Ireland	24:44
60	Ben Norris	United Kingdom	24:48
61	Adam Haroon	Sudan	24:49
62	Jonathan Hay	United Kingdom	24:53
63	José Costa	Portugal	24:57
64	David Ricketts	Australia	24:57
65	Lucas Bruchet	Canada	24:57
66	Ammar Moussa	United States	25:00
67	Dylan Haight	Canada	25:00
68	Mohamed Salhi	Algeria	25:01
69	Aaron Pulford	New Zealand	25:02
70	Houssem Chaabani	Tunisia	25:02
71	Romain Collenot-Spriet	France	25:03
72	Marek Kowalski	Poland	25:04
73	Tanguy Pepiot	France	25:04
74	Richard Goodman	United Kingdom	25:05
75	Daryl Smith	Canada	25:06
76	Mattias Wolter	Canada	25:06
77	Lucas Bothobutle	South Africa	25:06
78	Michael Gras	France	25:09
79	Francois Marzetta	Italy	25:13
80	Yousif Musa Daif Alla	Sudan	25:14
81	Fernando Carro	Spain	25:17
82	Marek Skorupa	Poland	25:19
83	Ethan Heywood	Australia	25:20
84	Michael Lynch	United States	25:23
85	Davide Ucellari	Italy	25:25
86	David Gosse	France	25:25
87	Mfumaneko Fadane	South Africa	25:28
88	Gabriel Navarro	Spain	25:31
89	Anass Zouhry	France	25:35
90	Giuseppe Gerratana	Italy	25:35
91	Wyatt Baiton	Canada	25:37
92	Mansour Haraoui	Algeria	25:43
93	Elsmani Ali Mohammed	Sudan	25:44
94	Khemais Abbassi	Tunisia	25:56
95	Krzysztof Hammer	Poland	25:59
96	Joshua Tedesco	Australia	26:02
97	Mario Mirabel	Spain	26:04
98	Issam Bouchache	Algeria	26:12
99	Yimer Getahun	Israel	26:14
100	Ahmed Ben Salah	Tunisia	26:18
101	Khalil Ouerfelli	Tunisia	26:24
102	Vitali Kuprevich	Belarus	26:34
103	Hammadi Annachi	Tunisia	26:38
104	Shun Morozumi	Japan	26:40
105	Mateusz Maik	Poland	26:45
106	Tomasz Kawik	Poland	26:48
107	Salah Teli	Tunisia	27:11
108	Paolo Ruatti	Italy	27:22
109	Bartosz Karon	Poland	27:32
110	Maru Teferi	Israel	27:37
111	Abdullah Al-Mutairi	Kuwait	28:06
112	Salem Mohamed Attiatalla	Egypt	28:13
113	Hamada Mohamed	Egypt	28:25
114	Aitor Gomez	Gibraltar	28:43
115	Ali Ahmed Araby	Egypt	29:13
116	Ahmed Abdelbasset Abdallah	Egypt	29:27
117	Abdullah Al-Qabandi	Kuwait	31:11
118	Abdullah Rabeaa	Kuwait	32:26
—	Hassan Hosny Mohamed	Egypt	DNF
—	Abdellah Dacha	Morocco	DNF
—	Ahmed Abdelrazek Abdelwahed	Egypt	DNF

==== Teams ====
Rank	Team	Points
1st place, gold medalist(s)	Kenya: Caleb Mwangangi Ndiku / 1; Clement Kiprono Langat / 2; Japhet Kipyegon Korir / 3; Isiah Kiplangat Koech / 4; (Gideon Kipkemoi Kipketer) / (8); (Charles Kibet Chepkurui) / (11)	10
2nd place, silver medalist(s)	Ethiopia: Debebe Woldsenbet / 6; Gashaw Biftu / 7; Gebretsadik Abraha / 9; Belete Assefa / 10; (Yekeber Bayabel) / (14); (Mosinet Geremew) / (16)	32
3rd place, bronze medalist(s)	Uganda: Moses Kibet / 5; Timothy Toroitich / 13; Thomas Ayeko / 18; Alex Cherop / 20; (Soyekwo Kibet) / (24)	56
4	Eritrea: Nassir Dawud / 12; Goitom Kifle / 15; Mulue Andom / 17; Teklit Teweldebrhan / 22; (Samson Gebreyohannes) / (23)	66
5	Morocco: Hicham Sigueni / 25; Abdelhadi Labäli / 26; Othmane El Goumri / 33; Abdelmajid El Hissouf / 37; (Othmane Laaroussi) / (49); (Abdellah Dacha) / (DNF)	121
6	Japan: Akinobu Murasawa / 28; Suguru Osako / 32; Takumi Honda / 35; Kazuto Nishiike / 38; (Takashi Ichida) / (40); (Shun Morozumi) / (104)	133
7	South Africa: Joel Mmone / 21; Sityhilo Diko / 30; Vuyisile Tshoba / 48; Pieter Jacobus Wilders / 58; (Lucas Bothobutle) / (77); (Mfumaneko Fadane) / (87)	157
8	United States: Trevor Dunbar / 29; Andrew Colley / 42; Walter Schafer / 44; Andrew Kimpel / 54; (Ammar Moussa) / (66); (Michael Lynch) / (84)	169
9	United Kingdom: Ronnie Sparke / 41; Callum Hawkins / 47; Tom Farrell / 50; Ben Norris / 60; (Jonathan Hay) / (62); (Richard Goodman) / (74)	198
10	Algeria: Abderrahmane Anou / 43; Mohammed El Amin Cheouaf / 52; Anes Traikia / 53; Mohamed Salhi / 68; (Mansour Haraoui) / (92); (Issam Bouchache) / (98)	216
11	Canada: Mohammed Ahmed / 27; Lucas Bruchet / 65; Dylan Haight / 67; Daryl Smith / 75; (Mattias Wolter) / (76); (Wyatt Baiton) / (91)	234
12	Sudan: Adam Abdelmunaim / 36; Adam Haroon / 61; Yousif Musa Daif Alla / 80; Elsmani Ali Mohammed / 93	270
13	France: Bryan Cantero / 51; Romain Collenot-Spriet / 71; Tanguy Pepiot / 73; Michael Gras / 78; (David Gosse) / (86); (Anass Zouhry) / (89)	273
14	Australia: Kevin Batt / 39; David Ricketts / 64; Ethan Heywood / 83; Joshua Tedesco / 96	282
15	Italy: Michele Fontana / 55; Francois Marzetta / 79; Davide Ucellari / 85; Giuseppe Gerratana / 90; (Paolo Ruatti) / (108)	309
16	Spain: Aitor Fernández / 56; Fernando Carro / 81; Gabriel Navarro / 88; Mario Mirabel / 97	322
17	Poland: Marek Kowalski / 72; Marek Skorupa / 82; Krzysztof Hammer / 95; Mateusz Maik / 105; (Tomasz Kawik) / (106); (Bartosz Karon) / (109)	354
18	Tunisia: Houssem Chaabani / 70; Khemais Abbassi / 94; Ahmed Ben Salah / 100; Khalil Ouerfelli / 101; (Hammadi Annachi) / (103); (Salah Teli) / (107)	365
19	Egypt: Salem Mohamed Attiatalla / 112; Hamada Mohamed Mohamed Ahmed / 113; Ali Ahmed Araby / 115; Ahmed Abdelbasset Abdallah / 116; (Ahmed Abdelrazek Abdelwahed) / (DNF); (Hassan Hosny Mohamed) / (DNF)	456

- Note: Athletes in parentheses did not score for the team result.

== Participation ==
According to an unofficial count, 121 athletes from 29 countries participated in the Junior men's race. This is in agreement with the official numbers as published.

- Algeria (6)
- Australia (4)
- Bahrain (2)
- Belarus (1)
- Canada (6)
- Egypt (6)
- Eritrea (5)
- Ethiopia (6)
- France (6)
- Gibraltar (1)
- Ireland (1)
- Israel (3)
- Italy (5)
- Japan (6)
- Kenya (6)
- Kuwait (3)
- Mexico (1)
- Morocco (6)
- New Zealand (1)
- Norway (1)
- Poland (6)
- Portugal (2)
- South Africa (6)
- Spain (4)
- Sudan (4)
- Tunisia (6)
- Uganda (5)
- United Kingdom (6)
- United States (6)

== See also ==
- 2010 IAAF World Cross Country Championships – Senior men's race
- 2010 IAAF World Cross Country Championships – Senior women's race
- 2010 IAAF World Cross Country Championships – Junior women's race
