= Teklit Teweldebrhan =

Eritrean runner

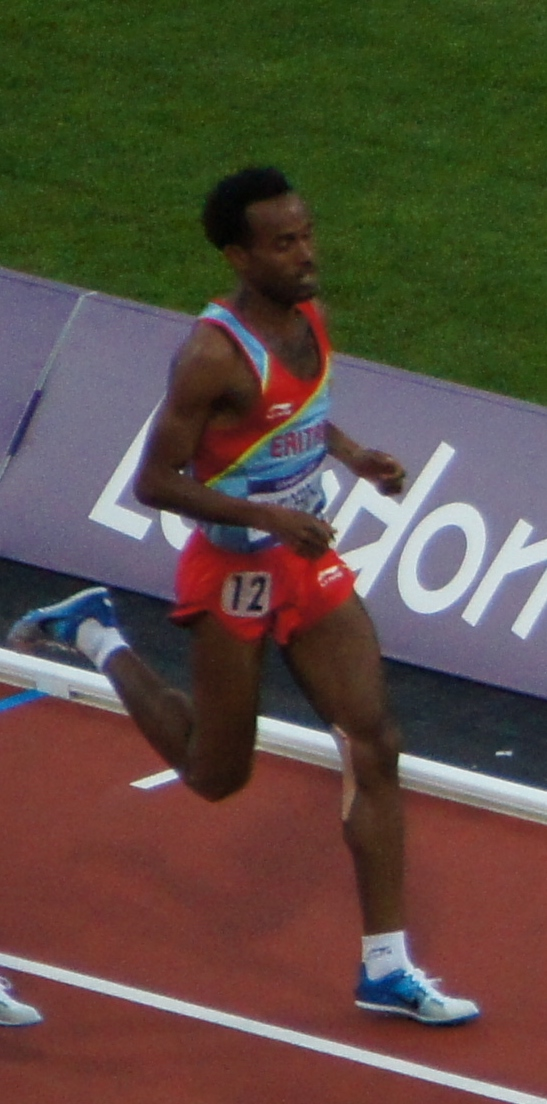
- Teweldebrhan at the 2012 Summer Olympics

Personal information
- Born: October 1, 1993 (age 32) Adi Zemer, Eritrea

Sport
- Sport: Track
- Event: 1500 metres

Achievements and titles
- Personal best: 1500 metres: 3:36.50

Teklit Teweldebrhan (born 1 October 1993) is an Eritrean runner who has specialized in various middle-distance and long-distance disciplines. He represented Eritrea at the 2012 Summer Olympics.

== Running career ==
Teweldebrhan made his first major international appearance at the 2010 IAAF World Cross Country Championships, where he finished the junior men's race in 22nd place of 118 finishers. At the 2012 World Junior Championships in Athletics, he made it to the finals round of the men's 1500 metres, finishing in eighth place overall with a time of 3:42.63 (min:sec). He would go on to run at the 2012 Summer Olympics at the age of 18, finishing the men's 1500 metres in 3:42.88.

== See also ==
- Eritrea at the 2012 Summer Olympics
