= 2010 IAAF World Cross Country Championships =

Coordinates: 53°10′00″N 18°02′19″E

38th World Cross Country Championships
- Organisers: IAAF
- Edition: 38th
- Date: 28 March
- Host city: Bydgoszcz, Województwo kujawsko-pomorskie, Poland
- Venue: Myślęcinek Park
- Events: 4
- Distances: 11.611 km – Senior men 7.759 km – Junior men 7.759 km – Senior women 5.833 km – Junior women
- Participation: 437 athletes from 51 nations
- Official website: 2010 Bydgoszcz

The 2010 IAAF World Cross Country Championships were held at Myślęcinek Park in Bydgoszcz, Poland on 28 March 2010. It was the first time in over twenty years that Poland hosted the annual championships, having previously held them in Warsaw in 1987. Kenyan runners dominated the competition, taking all four individual titles and all four team titles at the competition. Kenyans took the top four spots in both junior men's and junior women's races to finish with a perfect team score.

In the absence of Zersenay Tadese and Kenenisa Bekele, the senior men's race was an opportunity for less-established runners. Joseph Ebuya won the gold (his first major medal), becoming the first Kenyan to win the men's race since Paul Tergat in 1999. Teklemariam Medhin of Eritrea took second place (also his first major medal) while Moses Ndiema Kipsiro of Uganda was third. Kenya won the senior men's team gold with ease and Eritrea won the team silver medal. Defending champion Gebregziabher Gebremariam only just made the top ten but led Ethiopia to the team bronze.

Florence Kiplagat was not present to defend the women's senior title, leaving Linet Masai and Tirunesh Dibaba as the favourites. However, a sprint finish by little-known runner Emily Chebet rendered Masai the silver medallist for a second year running. Meselech Melkamu of Ethiopia won the fourth World Cross Country bronze of her career as Dibaba finished outside the medals. Kenya and Ethiopia won the team gold and silver, respectively, while Shalane Flanagan led the United States women's team to a bronze medal.

The top four in both the junior men and women's races were all Kenyan, with Caleb Mwangangi Ndiku and Mercy Cherono the gold medallists. The dominance of the competition by Kenyan and East African runners was accompanied by a decline in the number of European teams that were entered for the tournament, with some historically strong countries sending no athletes at all.

== Preparation ==
=== Bidding ===
The Bydgoszcz bid for the World Cross Country Championships was approved on 22 March 2009 at the spring IAAF Council meeting.

=== Qualification ===
Athletes could gain qualification into the World Championships through performances at either their national championships or through the following IAAF Permit Meetings:

- Oeiras International Cross Country
- Cross Internacional de Soria
- Lotto Cross Cup Brussels
- Great Edinburgh International Cross Country
- Cross Internacional de Itálica
- Antrim International Cross Country
- Cinque Mulini
- Chiba International Cross Country
- KCB Nairobi Cross
- Fukuoka International Cross Country Meet
- Eurocross
- Almond Blossom Cross

=== Pre-championship events ===
In order to raise awareness prior to the championships, the city and Polish athletics association organised a weekly cross country run (the Cross Bydgoski) every Sunday on the race course from 25 October onwards. Renowned Polish athletes were invited and Artur Kohutek and Marika Popowicz were among those who took to the course to compete alongside professional and amateur runners alike.

The Polish Cross Country Championships were held at the venue, acting as a pre-championship tester for the Myślęcinek Park course two weeks prior to the main event. Katarzyna Kowalska won the women's 8 km race while Marcin Chabowski won the men's 12 km event. The organising committee introduced an event mascot – a large grey squirrel called "Crossby".

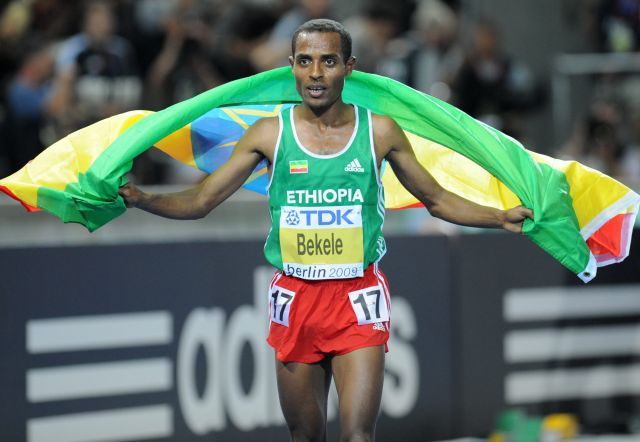
Kenenisa Bekele missed the competition through injury

=== Pre-race form ===
Before the event, the possible medallists of men's race were less predictable than in previous years – Kenenisa Bekele, who had won six long and five short course gold medals in the previous decade, was ruled out due to an injury and his nearest competitor, 2007 winner Zersenay Tadese, missed the championships to focus on road running instead.

Their absence suggested that a Kenyan runner might top the men's podium for the first time in over ten years. The largely untested Paul Tanui had established himself by summarily beating his more experienced counterparts by over half a minute at the Kenyan championships. Leonard Komon and Joseph Ebuya were other Kenyan men in strong form. Many of Ethiopia's top athletes were absent, although the defending champion Gebregziabher Gebremariam was a key medal contender and former junior champion Ayele Abshero was making his first try at the senior ranks. Outside the traditionally successful Ethiopian and Kenya teams, Samuel Tsegay of Eritrea and 2009 silver medallist Moses Ndiema Kipsiro of Uganda were medal possibilities, while the 2009 European Champion Alemayehu Bezabeh headed an improved Spanish team.

In the women's race, Linet Masai (2009 silver medallist) and Tirunesh Dibaba (the 2008 champion) were strong favourites for the women's medals. The defending champion, Florence Kiplagat, was not in attendance but 2009 fourth placer Lineth Chepkurui was another Kenyan contender for the medals. Ethiopia entered a strong team, including Dibaba, 2003 champion Werknesh Kidane and multiple past medallist Meselech Melkamu. Non-African runners in good form were 2004 champion Benita Willis of Australia and 2009 European champion Hayley Yelling. The United States and Portugal had entered strong women's teams, led by national champions Shalane Flanagan and Ana Dulce Félix respectively, which were given good medalling possibilities.

== Competition ==
=== Venue and conditions ===
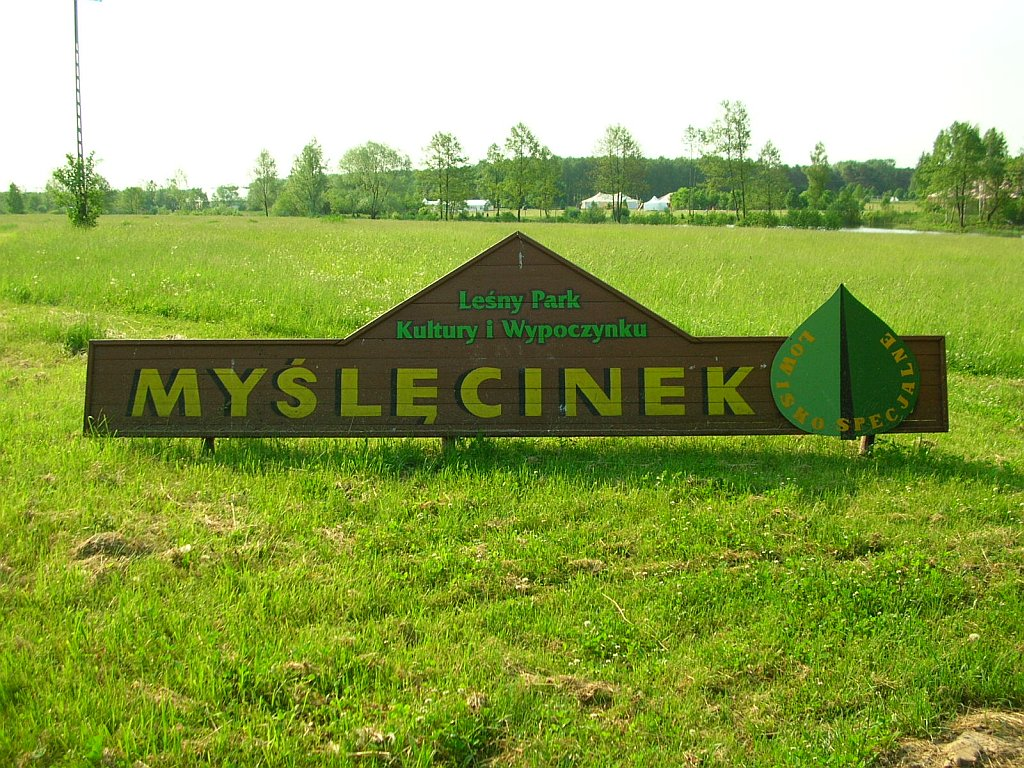
Sign at the entrance of the venue – Myślęcinek Park

The course for the race was flat with a number of turns and was grassy and reasonably dry underfoot. An unusual addition to the relatively straightforward course was the placement of large wooden logs on the course as hurdles. This aspect came under criticism from Jason Henderson of Athletics Weekly, who commented that the course "seems to be some kind of children’s play park, runners also have to run past a bizarre-looking wooden crocodile." A mix of unseasonably warm weather, followed by a cold, overcast day prior to the championships, suggested the event would be held in less than ideal conditions. However, the race day itself was sunny and (at 10°C) the temperature was well-suited to the runners.

=== Men's race ===
The men's race started at a middling-pace and 20 runners (mostly Kenyans, Ethiopians and Eritreans) had formed a leading pack by the third lap. Defending champion Gebregziabher Gebremariam was not among them and it soon became obvious he would not reach the podium for a second year running. Samuel Tsegay and Teklemariam Medhin of Eritrea began to increase the pace at the beginning of the fourth lap. This disrupted the pack and by the end of the lap Medhin was leading, shortly followed by Joseph Ebuya and Moses Kipsiro, who was a little further behind. Ebuya took the lead and he continued the quicker pace for the fifth and final lap. Medhin stayed close to Ebuya, however, while Leonard Komon and Kipsiro were battling for the bronze medal position.

As the race drew to a close, Ebuya pulled away from Medhin to beat the Eritrean by six seconds, becoming the first Kenyan senior men's champion since Paul Tergat in 1999. Komon and Kipsiro engaged in a sprint finish in the final straight and, although they recorded the same time, it was Kipsiro who took the honours. Tsegay and Hasan Mahboob took fifth and sixth places and a Kenyan trio of Richard Kipkemboi Mateelong, Paul Tanui, and Hosea Mwok Macharinyang ensured that Kenya took the team gold as well. Eritrea took the team silver medal, pushing Ethiopian into third place on the team podium. Chakir Boujattaoui (in 12th place) helped Morocco to fourth in the rankings while Saudi Arabian-born runner Simon Bairu, representing Canada, was the first non-African to cross the line.

Later that year, Boujattaoui's performance was erased from the record as he failed a pre-race drug test for MIRCERA (an EPO variant). This meant that Bairu was elevated into the top twelve while Uganda moved ahead of Morocco by one place in the final team rankings.

=== Women's race ===
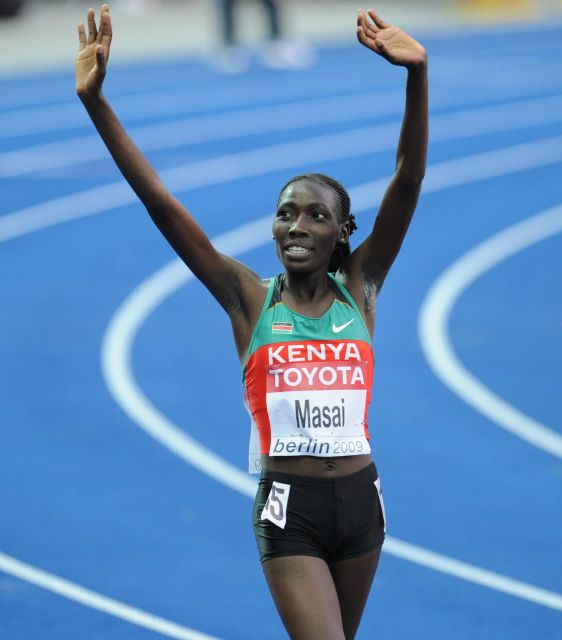
Linet Masai won the silver for the second year running

Linet Masai, the previous year's silver medallist, made a strong start to the race and began to set the pace for the race alongside her Kenyan teammates. After the first lap around fifteen runners had formed a leading pack comprising mainly Kenyan and Ethiopian runners, although Benita Willis, Shalane Flanagan, and Hilda Kibet remained among them. The group stayed together until the third lap at which point the pace became too much for some runners. By the midpoint of the lap, former champion Tirunesh Dibaba had slipped out of contention and was ten seconds behind the three leading athletes: Masai, Emily Chebet and Meselech Melkamu.

In the final lap, Masai made her move and began to forge a lead over the other two runners. However, Chebet began to chase Masai, leaving Melkamu behind her. Masai was ahead at the final straight towards the finish but Chebet's sprint quickly reduced the gap between the two. The little-known Chebet won at the line, defeating the pre-race favourite Masai, who had to content herself with another silver having lost another sprint finish at the competition. Melkamu took third uncontested while Dibaba was fourth some twelve seconds behind the bronze medallist. Kenyans Lineth Chepkurui and Margaret Wangari Muriuki took fifth and sixth to confirm their team gold and the Ethiopian women took the team silver. American runner Shalane Flanagan was twelfth and top-20 finishes from Molly Huddle and Magdalena Lewy-Boulet helped the United States to a team bronze.

=== Junior races ===
The junior men's race was a straightforward affair: a Kenyan trio of Caleb Ndiku, Clement Langat and Japhet Korir monopolised first position for laps one and two. Ndiku took to the front of the leading pack on the third lap and never relinquished his position after maintaining a fast pace. As Ndiku increased his lead, Moses Kibet of Uganda attempted to follow, but he eventually fell off the pace. Langat and Korir pulled closer to their teammate in the final stages but they took second and third place respectively. Isaiah Koech overtook Kibet to head the Kenyan team to a perfect gold, occupying the top four spots. With Ethiopia, Uganda and Eritrea taking the next three team spots, the upper rankings featured almost exclusively East African runners, with Joel Mmone of South Africa (21st place) being the only exception among the first 24 runners to finish.

The junior women's race marked a resounding defeat for the defending Ethiopian team and its defending champion Genzebe Dibaba. The leading pack remained large during the first two laps, but on the third and final lap the Kenyan women asserted themselves. By the halfway point, Mercy Cherono was at the front of a group of four Kenyans comprising Purity Rionoripo, Esther Chemtai and Faith Chepngetich. Cherono pulled ahead of her compatriots and won with ease. Rionoripo just pipped Chemtai for second place in a sprint finish, shortly followed by Chepndetich in fourth place. Dibaba finished in eleventh, helping Ethiopia to the team silver. Uganda took the team bronze while the first non-African-born runner home was Gulshat Fazlitdinova of Russia.

== Reception ==
Having won every gold medal on offer, as well as a 1–2 in the women's race and every junior individual medal, Kenya were perceived as being by far the dominant force of the championships. However, while this success was lauded as a great achievement for Kenya by commentators such as former champion John Ngugi, this dominance came with a fall in both interest and participation from Western countries. Nations with distinguished histories in long distance running, such as Russia, Germany and Finland, sent no senior athletes to the championships at all, while the sole runners for Belgium and the Netherlands (Atelaw Yeshetela and Hilda Kibet) were both born in East Africa.

The secretary general of the IAAF, Pierre Weiss, acknowledged the lack of European teams present at the competition, but said that problem was solely with world championships participation and not the sport of cross country running as a whole as the 2009 European Cross Country Championships had been successful. IAAF president Lamine Diack stated that European runners needed to learn from the East Africans to improve their performances. However, the decline in European interest had a direct effect on the scheduling of the world championships event, which had been changed from an annual to a biennial format by a large majority of votes at the 2009 IAAF Congress.

== Medallists ==
Event	Gold		Silver		Bronze	
Individual
Senior men (11.611 km)	Joseph Ebuya; Kenya	33:00	Teklemariam Medhin; Eritrea	33:06	Moses Ndiema Kipsiro; Uganda	33:10
Junior men (7.759 km)	Caleb Mwangangi Ndiku; Kenya	22:07	Clement Kiprono Langat; Kenya	22:09	Japhet Kipyegon Korir; Kenya	22:12
Senior women (7.759 km)	Emily Chebet; Kenya	24:19	Linet Chepkwemoi Masai; Kenya	24:20	Meselech Melkamu; Ethiopia	24:26
Junior women (5.833 km)	Mercy Cherono; Kenya	18:47	Purity Cherotich Rionoripo; Kenya	18:54	Esther Chemtai; Kenya	18:55
Team
Senior men	Kenya	20	Eritrea	46	Ethiopia	69
Junior men	Kenya	10	Ethiopia	32	Uganda	56
Senior women	Kenya	14	Ethiopia	22	United States	76
Junior women	Kenya	10	Ethiopia	30	Uganda	81

Senior Men Senior Women

== Results ==
=== Senior men's race (11.611 km) ===
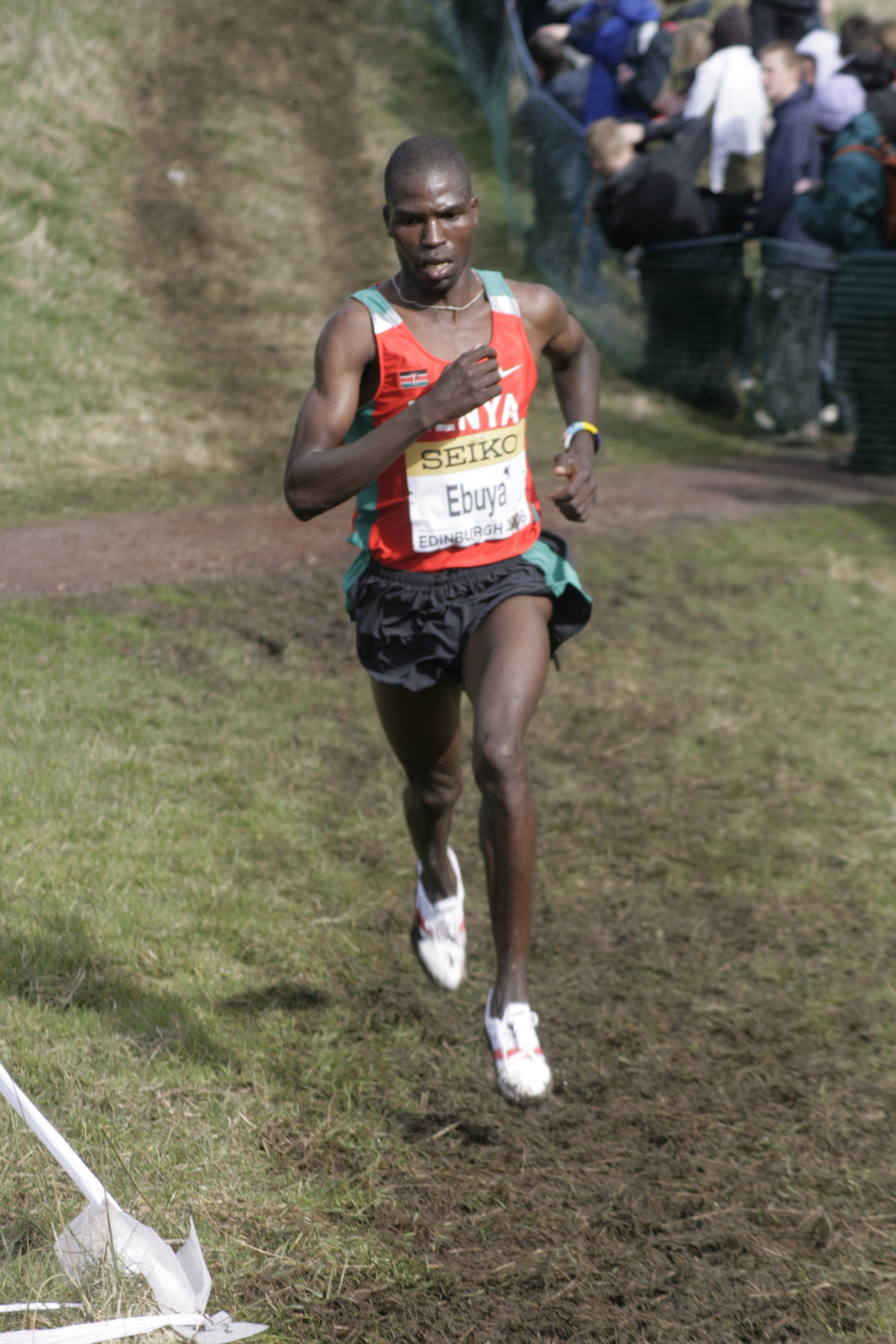
Joseph Ebuya won the gold – the first major medal of his career

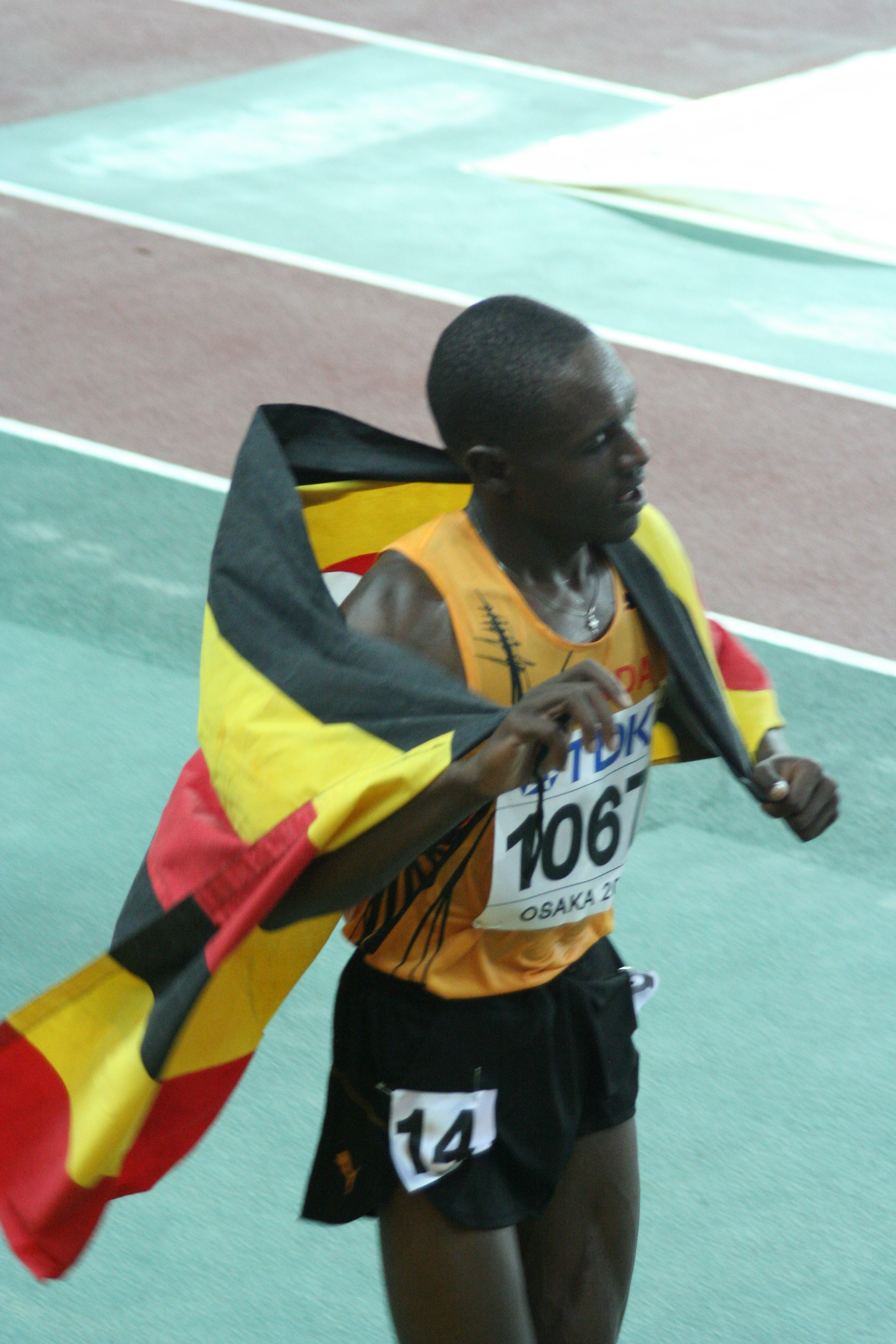
Moses Kipsiro made the podium for a second year in a row

Complete results for senior men and for senior men's teams were published.

Individual race
Rank	Athlete	Country	Time (m:s)
Gold medal	Joseph Ebuya	Kenya	33:00
Silver medal	Teklemariam Medhin	Eritrea	33:06
Bronze medal	Moses Ndiema Kipsiro	Uganda	33:10
4	Leonard Patrick Komon	Kenya	33:10
5	Samuel Tsegay	Eritrea	33:27
6	Hasan Mahboob	Bahrain	33:28
7	Richard Kipkemboi Mateelong	Kenya	33:29
8	Paul Kipngetich Tanui	Kenya	33:30
9	Hosea Mwok Macharinyang	Kenya	33:31
10	Gebregziabher Gebremariam	Ethiopia	33:35
11	Ahmad Hassan Abdullah	Qatar	33:36
12 ^{†}	Simon Bairu	Canada	33:42
Full results

- ^{†} = Chakir Boujattaoui of Morocco was the original 12th-place finisher, but was disqualified for a doping offence.

Teams
Rank	Team	Points ^{†}
Gold medal	Kenya: Joseph Ebuya / 1; Leonard Patrick Komon / 4; Richard Kipkemboi Mateelong / 7; Paul Kipngetich Tanui / 8; (Hosea Mwok Macharinyang) / (9); (Lucas Kimeli Rotich) / (18)	20
Silver medal	Eritrea: Teklemariam Medhin / 2; Samuel Tsegay / 5; Kidane Tadasse / 14; Kiflom Sium / 23; (Tesfayohannes Mesfin) / (34); (Tewelde Estifanos) / (38)	44
Bronze medal	Ethiopia: Gebregziabher Gebremariam / 10; Abera Kuma / 16; Hunegnaw Mesfin / 19; Azmeraw Bekele / 21; (Ayele Abshero) / (24); (Feyisa Lilesa) / (25)	66
4	Uganda	86
5	Spain	147
6	Tanzania	155
7	Bahrain	165
8	United States	174
Full results

- ^{†} = The disqualification of Morocco's Boujattaoui affected the points totals in the team competition, with the main result being that Uganda were moved up to fourth place ahead of Morocco.
- Note: Athletes in parentheses did not score for the team result.

=== Senior women's race (7.759 km) ===
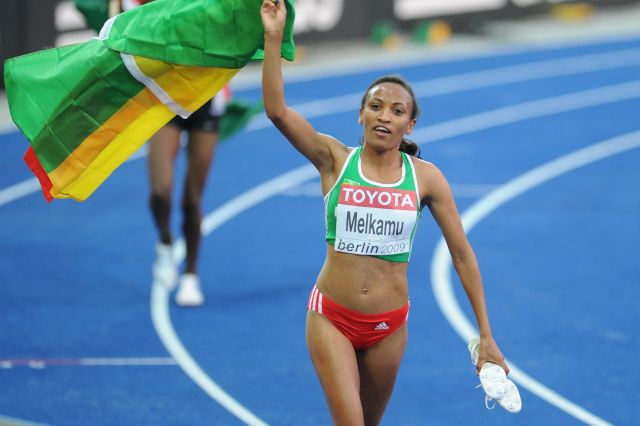
Meselech Melkamu won her fifth senior individual medal at the competition

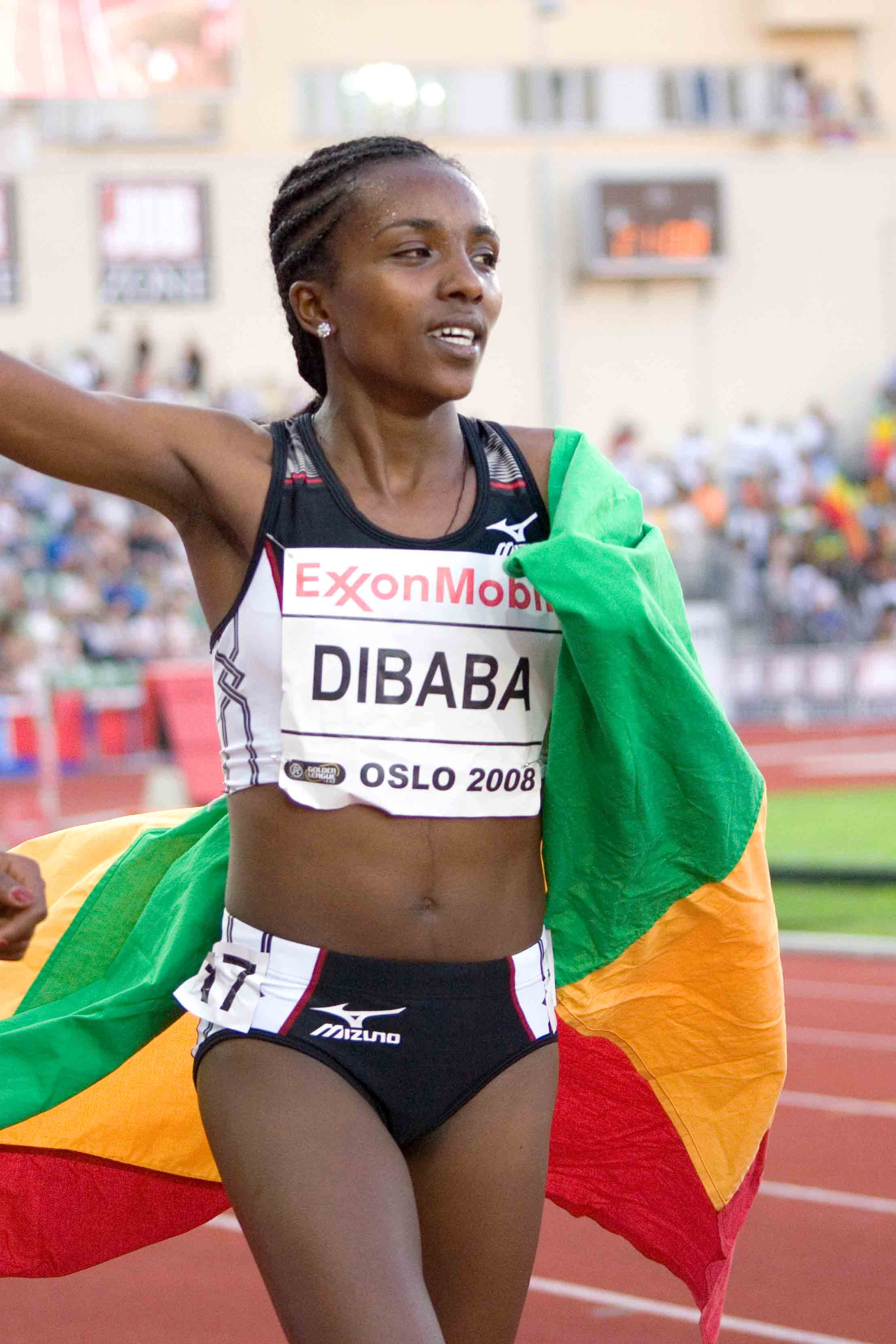
Former champion Tirunesh Dibaba had to settle for team silver

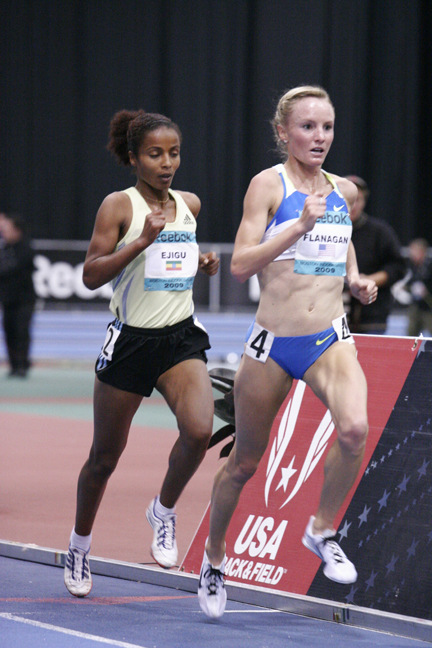
Shalane Flanagan (right) headed the United States to a team bronze medal

Complete results for senior women, and for senior women's teams were published.

Individual race
Rank	Athlete	Country	Time (m:s)
Gold medal	Emily Chebet	Kenya	24:19
Silver medal	Linet Masai	Kenya	24:20
Bronze medal	Meselech Melkamu	Ethiopia	24:26
4	Tirunesh Dibaba	Ethiopia	24:38
5	Lineth Chepkurui	Kenya	24:40
6	Margaret Muriuki	Kenya	24:42
7	Feyse Tadese	Ethiopia	25:03
8	Mamitu Daska	Ethiopia	25:03
9	Werknesh Kidane	Ethiopia	25:07
10	Hilda Kibet	Netherlands	25:17
11	Shitaye Eshete	Bahrain	25:20
12	Shalane Flanagan	United States	25:20
Full results

Teams
Rank	Team	Points
Gold medal	Kenya: Emily Chebet / 1; Linet Chepkwemoi Masai / 2; Lineth Chepkurui / 5; Margaret Wangari Muriuki / 6; (Hannah Wanjiru Gatheru) / (13); (Gladys Jepkemoi Chemweno) / (14)	14
Silver medal	Ethiopia: Meselech Melkamu / 3; Tirunesh Dibaba / 4; Feyse Tadese / 7; Mamitu Daska / 8; (Werknesh Kidane) / (9); (Abebech Afework) / (18)	22
Bronze medal	United States: Shalane Flanagan / 12; Molly Huddle / 19; Magdalena Lewy-Boulet / 20; Amy Hastings / 25; (Renee Metivier Baillie) / (38); (Emily Brown) / (41)	76
4	Morocco	127
5	Portugal	127
6	United Kingdom	140
7	Japan	150
8	Australia	155
Full results

- Note: Athletes in parentheses did not score for the team result.

=== Junior men's race (7.759 km) ===
Complete for junior men, and for junior men's teams were published.

Individual race
Rank	Athlete	Country	Time (m:s)
Gold medal	Caleb Mwangangi Ndiku	Kenya	22:07
Silver medal	Clement Kiprono Langat	Kenya	22:09
Bronze medal	Japhet Kipyegon Korir	Kenya	22:12
4	Isaiah Kiplangat Koech	Kenya	22:24
5	Moses Kibet	Uganda	22:27
6	Debebe Woldsenbet	Ethiopia	22:28
7	Gashaw Biftu	Ethiopia	22:31
8	Gideon Kipkemoi Kipketer	Kenya	22:33
9	Gebretsadik Abraha	Ethiopia	22:37
10	Belete Assefa	Ethiopia	22:41
11	Charles Kibet Chepkurui	Kenya	22:44
12	Nassir Dawud	Eritrea	22:48
Full results

Teams
Rank	Team	Points
Gold medal	Kenya: Caleb Mwangangi Ndiku / 1; Clement Kiprono Langat / 2; Japhet Kipyegon Korir / 3; Isiah Kiplangat Koech / 4; (Gideon Kipkemoi Kipketer) / (8); (Charles Kibet Chepkurui) / (11)	10
Silver medal	Ethiopia: Debebe Woldsenbet / 6; Gashaw Biftu / 7; Gebretsadik Abraha / 9; Belete Assefa / 10; (Yekeber Bayabel) / (14); (Mosinet Geremew) / (16)	32
Bronze medal	Uganda: Moses Kibet / 5; Timothy Toroitich / 13; Thomas Ayeko / 18; Alex Cherop / 20; (Soyekwo Kibet) / (24)	56
4	Eritrea	66
5	Morocco	121
6	Japan	133
7	South Africa	157
8	United States	169
Full results

- Note: Athletes in parentheses did not score for the team result.

=== Junior women's race (5.833 km) ===
Complete results for junior women, and for junior women's teams were published.

Individual race
Rank	Athlete	Country	Time (m:s)
Gold medal	Mercy Cherono	Kenya	18:47
Silver medal	Purity Cherotich Rionoripo	Kenya	18:54
Bronze medal	Esther Chemtai	Kenya	18:55
4	Faith Kipyegon	Kenya	19:02
5	Genet Yalew	Ethiopia	19:03
6	Emebet Anteneh	Ethiopia	19:06
7	Nelly Chebet Ngeiywo	Kenya	19:06
8	Afera Godfay	Ethiopia	19:07
9	Alice Aprot Nawowuna	Kenya	19:14
10	Tejitu Daba	Bahrain	19:14
11	Genzebe Dibaba	Ethiopia	19:21
12	Merima Mohammed	Ethiopia	19:26
Full results

Teams
Rank	Team	Points
Gold medal	Kenya: Mercy Cherono / 1; Purity Cherotich Rionoripo / 2; Esther Chemtai / 3; Faith Kipyegon / 4; (Nelly Chebet Ngeiywo) / (7); (Alice Aprot Nawowuna) / (9)	10
Silver medal	Ethiopia: Genet Yalew / 5; Emebet Anteneh / 6; Afera Godfay / 8; Genzebe Dibaba / 11; (Merima Mohammed) / (12); (Waganesh Mekasha) / (13)	30
Bronze medal	Uganda: Annet Negesa / 14; Rebecca Cheptegei / 15; Viola Chemos / 25; Linet Chebet / 27; (Mercy Chelangat) / (37)	81
4	Japan	98
5	United Kingdom	105
6	United States	123
7	Algeria	197
8	Canada	202
Full results

- Note: Athletes in parentheses did not score for the team result.

== Medal table ==
Rank	Nation	Gold	Silver	Bronze	Total
1	Kenya (KEN)	8	3	2	13
2	Ethiopia (ETH)	0	3	2	5
3	Eritrea (ERI)	0	2	0	2
4	Uganda (UGA)	0	0	3	3
5	United States (USA)	0	0	1	1
Totals (5 entries)		8	8	8	24

- Note: Totals include both individual and team medals, with medals in the team competition counting as one medal.

== Participation ==
According to an unofficial count, 437 athletes from 51 countries participated. This is in agreement with the official numbers as published.

- Algeria (12)
- Argentina (2)
- Australia (16)
- Azerbaijan (2)
- Bahrain (12)
- Belarus (2)
- Belgium (1)
- Botswana (5)
- Brazil (5)
- Bulgaria (1)
- Canada (13)
- China (3)
- Egypt (6)
- Eritrea (11)
- Estonia (1)
- Ethiopia (24)
- France (18)
- Gibraltar (2)
- Iraq (4)
- Ireland (2)
- Israel (4)
- Italy (10)
- Japan (24)
- Jordan (2)
- Kazakhstan (3)
- Kenya (24)
- Kuwait (3)
- Lesotho (2)
- Mexico (7)
- Morocco (18)
- Netherlands (1)
- New Zealand (9)
- Norway (2)
- Peru (1)
- Poland (24)
- Portugal (15)
- Qatar (5)
- Russia (6)
- Rwanda (1)
- Seychelles (2)
- Somalia (1)
- South Africa (23)
- Spain (19)
- Sudan (4)
- Switzerland (1)
- Tajikistan (2)
- Tanzania (4)
- Tunisia (17)
- Uganda (16)
- United Kingdom (21)
- United States (24)

== See also ==
- 2010 IAAF World Cross Country Championships – Senior men's race
- 2010 IAAF World Cross Country Championships – Junior men's race
- 2010 IAAF World Cross Country Championships – Senior women's race
- 2010 IAAF World Cross Country Championships – Junior women's race
- 2008 World Junior Championships in Athletics in Bydgoszcz
