= Purity Cherotich =

Purity Cherotich is the name of

- Purity Cherotich Kirui (born 1991), Kenyan steeplechase runner
- Purity Cherotich Rionoripo (born 1993), Kenyan long-distance runner
