= Annet Negesa =

Ugandan middle-distance runner

Personal information
- Nationality: Uganda
- Born: 24 April 1992 (age 34) Igamba, Uganda

Sport
- Sport: Running
- Event(s): 800 metres, 1500 metres

Achievements and titles
- Personal bests: 800 m: 1:59.08 NR (2012); 1500 m: 4:09.17 (2011)
Medal record
Women's athletics
Representing Uganda
World Junior Championships
Bronze medal – third place	2010 Moncton	800 m
African Junior Championships
Gold medal – first place	2011 Gaborone	800 m
Gold medal – first place	2011 Gaborone	1500 m

Annet Negesa (born 24 April 1992) is a Ugandan former middle-distance runner who specialised in the 800 metres. She broke Ugandan national records in the 800 m and the 1500 metres as a teenager and was a three-time national champion at the Ugandan Athletics Championships. She represented her country at the 2011 World Championships in Athletics and was the 800 m gold medallist at the 2011 All-Africa Games. As a junior (under-20) athlete, she won a team bronze medal at the 2010 IAAF World Cross Country Championships, an 800 m bronze at the 2010 World Junior Championships in Athletics, and two gold medals at the 2011 African Junior Athletics Championships. She was named 2011 Athlete of the Year by Uganda Athletics Federation.

Negesa is an intersex woman with XY chromosomes and endogenous testosterone levels in the typical male range. Under rules set by the International Association of Athletics Federations (IAAF), she had to reduce her testosterone levels in order to compete in the women's category. Facing pressure to continue her career, she underwent a gonadectomy, a procedure to remove internal testes in 2012. Negesa later said the purpose of the surgery had been misrepresented to her, having been compared to an "injection". The inadequate medical aftercare and physical and mental damage resulting from the surgery effectively ended her career. She returned to the track at the 2017 Ugandan Championships but completed the 1500 metres in 5:06.18 – nearly a minute below her best and a time which ranked her as a club level runner rather than an elite athlete.

While the IAAF denied recommending or paying for the surgery, Negesa's case fueled controversy over the treatment of athletes with differences in sex development. In 2019, the German government granted her asylum. She was one of the athletes whose cases were profiled in Phyllis Ellis's 2022 documentary film Category: Woman.

== International competitions ==
Year	Competition	Venue	Position	Event	Notes
2010	World Cross Country Championships	Bydgoszcz, Poland	14th	Junior race	19:44
2010	World Cross Country Championships	Bydgoszcz, Poland	3rd	Junior team	81 pts
2010	World Junior Championships	Moncton, Canada	3rd	800 m	2:02.51
2010	World Junior Championships	Moncton, Canada	8th (h1)	1500 m	4:22.14
2010	Commonwealth Games	New Delhi, India	4th (h3)	800 m	2:03.69
2010	Commonwealth Games	New Delhi, India	—	1500 m	DNS
2010	Commonwealth Games	New Delhi, India	—	4 × 400 m relay	DQ
2011	IAAF World Cross Country Championships	Punta Umbría, Spain	66th	Senior race	27:56
2011	IAAF World Cross Country Championships	Punta Umbría, Spain	6th	Senior team	148 pts
2011	African Junior Championships	Gaborone, Botswana	1st	800 m	2:04.94
2011	African Junior Championships	Gaborone, Botswana	1st	1500 m	4:09.17 NR
2011	World Championships	Daegu, South Korea	18th (sf)	800 m	2:01.51
2011	All-Africa Games	Maputo, Mozambique	1st	800 m	2:01.81
2011	All-Africa Games	Maputo, Mozambique	7th	1500 m	4:24.32
2012	African Cross Country Championships	Cape Town, South Africa	9th	Senior race	27:58
2012	African Cross Country Championships	Cape Town, South Africa	3rd	Senior team	1:53:17
2012	African Championships	Porto-Novo, Benin	6th	800 m	2:02.84

== National titles ==
- Ugandan Athletics Championships
  - 800 m: 2011
  - 1500 m: 2009, 2011

== See also ==
- List of Young Achievers Award winners
- List of African Games medalists in athletics (women)
