= Merima Mohammed =

Ethiopian long-distance runner (born 1992)

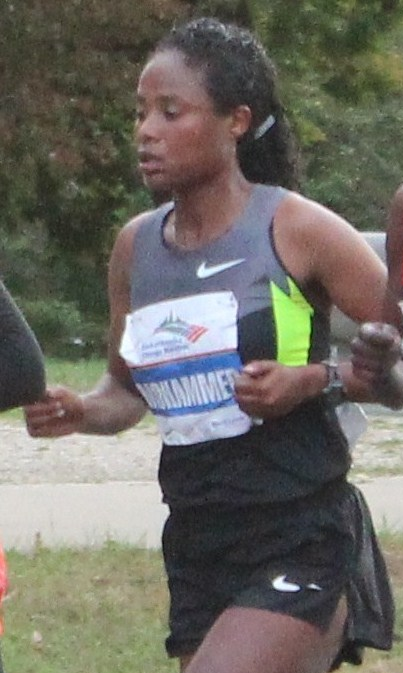

Personal information
- Full name: Merima Mohammed Hasen
- Nationality: Ethiopian
- Born: 10 June 1992 (age 33)

Sport
- Country: Ethiopia
- Sport: Long-distance running

Merima Mohammed Hasen (born 10 June 1992) is an Ethiopian professional long-distance runner who competes in road running events, including the marathon. Her personal best of 2:23:06 hours for the distance makes her the second fastest teenager ever over the 42.195 kilometres (26.219 mi) distance. She has won marathons in Düsseldorf, Nice and Ottawa. She represented Ethiopia at the IAAF World Cross Country Championships in 2011.

== Career ==
=== Junior career ===
Her talent for running was identified at an early age and, having gained representation with Elite Sports Management International, she began to compete on the European road race circuit at the age of sixteen. She was runner-up over 1500 metres at the 2009 Ethiopian Middle Distance Championships in January. She was selected to represent her country over that distance at the 2009 World Youth Championships in Athletics in July, but a trip in the final lap saw her go from the front of the pack to a twelfth-place finish. She took on significantly longer distances soon after, winning a French 10K race and then coming fifth in the Lille Half Marathon in September. She made her debut over the marathon distance in November that year and won on her first attempt, being the first runner home at the Marathon des Alpes-Maritimes in a time of 2:33:56 hours.

Merima was chosen for the junior race at the 2010 IAAF World Cross Country Championships and came twelfth, one place behind fellow Ethiopian teenager Genzebe Dibaba. She ran at the Ethiopian Championships in May and set a personal best of 34:10.19 minutes for the 10,000 metres, coming in sixth place. Her second marathon win came soon after, as she defeated all opposition at the Ottawa Marathon. She spent four months resting and preparing for another outing in Canada. At the Toronto Waterfront Marathon she finished in third place in a time of 2:23:06 hours – this was faster than the previous Canadian all-comers mark and made her the second fastest teenager ever over the distance, behind China's Zhang Yingying. Representing the Federal Prisons team, she participated in the Ethiopian 30K Championships in November and outran Mamitu Daska to claim the national title. At the Delhi Half Marathon that month she led throughout to the race, but was beaten at the line by Aselefech Mergia in a tactical sprint finish. Nevertheless, she left the competition with a significant personal best of 1:08:36 hours for the distance.

=== Senior career ===
The 2011 Mumbai Marathon turned into a late race duel between Merima and her national rival Koren Jelila Yal. The winning time was the fastest ever in India, but it was Yal who won the race while Merima finished a single second behind with a final time of 2:26:57 hours. She decided to compete in the senior section of the Ethiopian cross country championships and her sixth-place finish gained her a place on the team for the 2011 IAAF World Cross Country Championships, where she came fifteenth. She was invited to run at the 2011 Boston Marathon but travel problems prevented her appearance. Still 18 years old, she took her third victory and her fourth marathon under the two-and-a-half-hour mark at the Düsseldorf Marathon in May. She quickly built up a lead that she did not relinquish, although hot temperatures slowed her in the latter half of the race: "I am used to cooler conditions because I train at an altitude of around 2000 metres". She was back in action a month later at the World 10K Bangalore, but she was pushed into the runner-up spot in the final metres by an Ethiopian rival yet again in India, this time by Dire Tune. At the 2011 Frankfurt Marathon she began the race with quick pace, but despite holding the lead for much of the early stages she slowed down and finished in fourth place overall.

In her first race of 2012, she was third at the Xiamen Marathon. She was among the favourites for the Rotterdam Marathon that April, but finished in third place almost seven minutes behind the winner, Tiki Gelana. She ran at the 2012 Chicago Marathon but despite being among the leading pack at the halfway mark, she dropped out in the latter stages. At the 2012 African Championships in Athletics she ran a 10,000 metres best of 33:09.25 minutes for fourth, and took the same placing at the Shanghai Marathon.

She had the second-fastest outing of her career at the 2013 Houston Marathon, taking the women's title in a time of 2:23:37 hours. She was faster still (2:23:14) at the Paris Marathon, where she was runner-up to Feyse Tadese.
