= Gideon Kipketer =

Kenyan long-distance runner

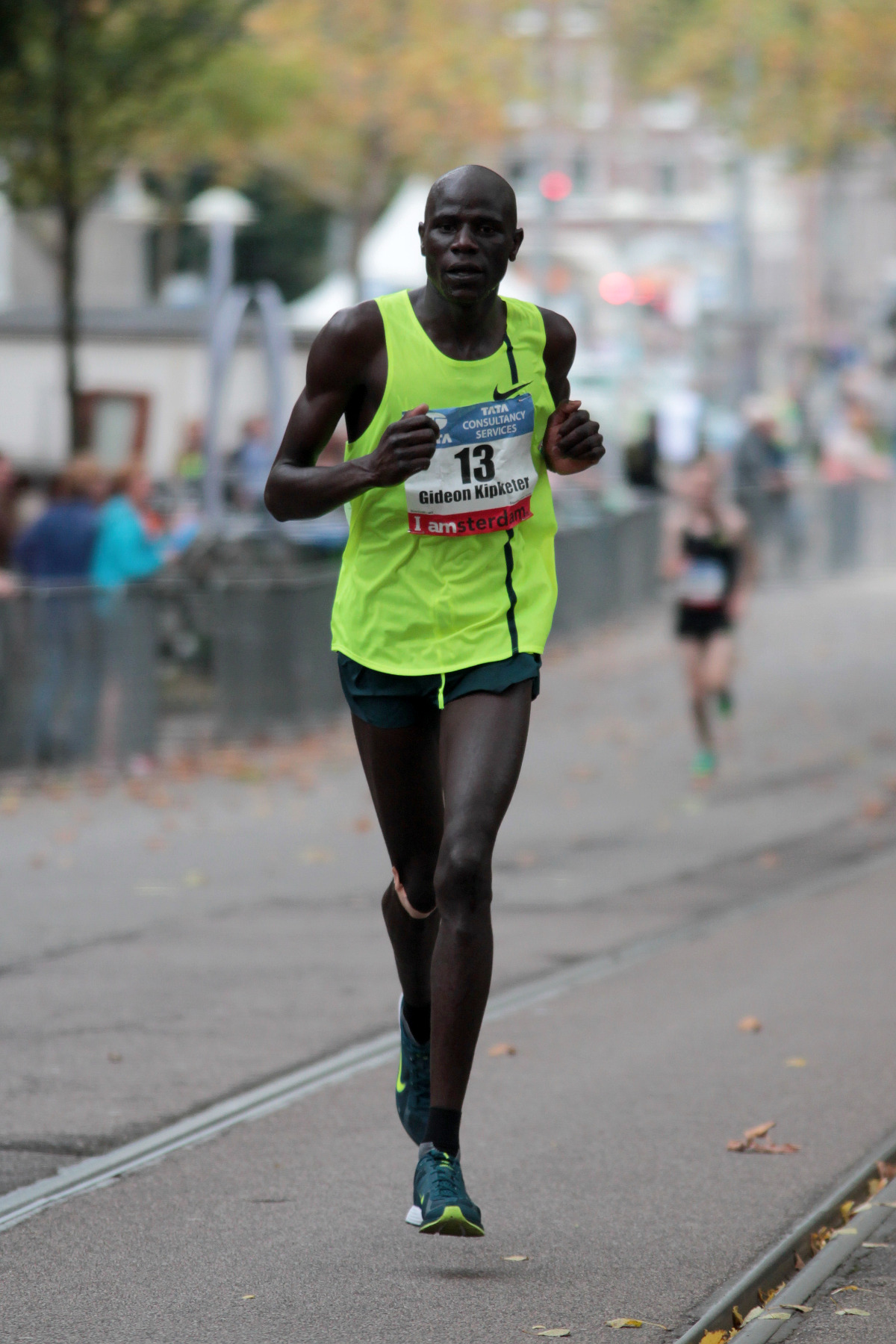
Kipketer at the 2014 Amsterdam Marathon.

Gideon Kipketer is a Kenyan long-distance runner, who specialises in road running events. Kipketer formerly part of the NN Running Team, an international team of elite long-distance runners and moved to Venator Sports Management (a sports management agency based in the UK) in 2023.

== Cross-country running ==
He finished 8th in the junior race at the 2010 IAAF World Cross Country Championships and won the 2012 Tuskys Wareng Cross Country.

== Marathon running ==
Kipketer won the 2016 Mumbai Marathon, setting a new course record. He was only in the race as a pace-setter, but decided to continue the race for the win.

He finished 3rd at the 2016 Chicago Marathon. and was 5th at the 2017 World Championships in London

His personal best is 2:05:51 from Tokyo in 2017
