= Japhet Korir =

Kenyan long-distance runner (born 1993)

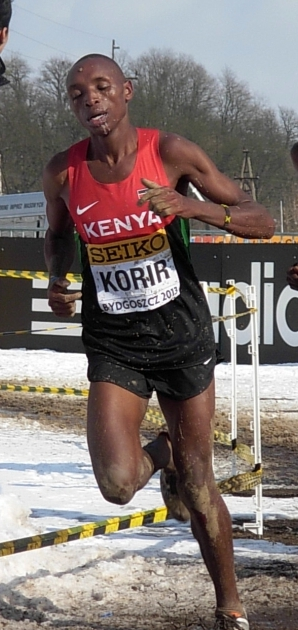
- Japhet Korir at the 2013 World Cross Country Championships

Medal record

Men's athletics

Representing Kenya

World Cross Country Championships
| Gold medal – first place | 2013 Bydgoszcz | Senior race |
| Bronze medal – third place | 2013 Bydgoszcz | Senior team race |

Japhet Kipyegon Korir (born 30 June 1993) is a Kenyan long-distance runner who competes in cross country running competitions and the 5000 metres. He was the gold medallist at the 2013 IAAF World Cross Country Championships, becoming the youngest ever world cross country champion. He has a personal best of 13:11.44 minutes for the 5000 m track event.

Korir had much success as a junior cross country athlete: he won two team titles and a bronze medal at the 2010 IAAF World Cross Country Championships, then took the first junior title at the African Cross Country Championships in 2011. He was the runner-up at the latter event in 2012.

== Career ==
Korir won his first international medal at the age of fifteen at the 2008 Commonwealth Youth Games, getting a bronze medal in the 5000 metres. He was part of the winning Kenyan junior team at the 2009 IAAF World Cross Country Championships, where he finished fifth, and helped retain that title at the 2010 IAAF World Cross Country Championships, where he came third as part of Kenyan podium sweep. He failed to make the team the following year but was chosen for the 2011 African Cross Country Championships, where he became the competition's first male junior champion. He ran in Europe later that year and set a personal best of 13:17.18 minutes for the 5000 m at the Nijmegen Global Athletics meeting.

He began the 2012 season with a 5000 m personal best of 13:11.44 minutes at the PSD Bank Meeting (moving up to fourth on the all-time junior indoor lists) and had a win at the Eurocross cross country race in Luxembourg. The IAAF World Cross Country Championships changed to a biennial format so was not held and Korir instead competed in the junior section of the 2012 African Cross Country Championships, placing a narrow second behind Ethiopia's Muktar Edris. He failed to make the Kenyan team for the 2012 World Junior Championships in Athletics in June, having been hurt by a competitor's track spikes, and missed the rest of the season due to an Achilles tendon injury.

In Korir's first year as a senior athlete he placed sixth at the Kenyan Cross Country Championships and the selectors, seeing he had recovered from injury, made a last-minute decision to add him to the Kenyan team. At the 2013 IAAF World Cross Country Championships he was the fourth youngest entrant in the men's senior race but he defeated much more experienced rivals to become the youngest ever world champion at the event (the former holder of that honour being multiple world champion Kenenisa Bekele). Following this success he set his sights on competing at the 2013 World Championships in Athletics. That April he won the 5000 m at the Melbourne Track Classic and the Würzburger Residenzlauf. His form dropped in May, however, as he came last in the 3000 metres at the Doha Diamond League meeting, then managed only 17th place at the World 10K Bangalore race. Korir missed the rest of the 2013 track season.

In early 2014, Korir won the Antrim International Cross Country race and the Great Ireland Run in April. Korir also moved up to compete in the half marathon, finishing in 7th place at the CPC Loop Den Haag in a time of 1:02:41 hours.

== Personal bests ==
- 3000 metres: 7:40.37 min (2012)
- 5000 metres (indoors): 13:11.44 min (2012)
- 5000 metres (outdoors): 13:17.18 min (2011)
- 10K run: 27:52 min (2013

== International competitions ==
| Year | Competition | Venue | Position | Event | Notes |
|---|---|---|---|---|---|
| 2008 | Commonwealth Youth Games | Pune, India | 3rd | 5000 m | |
| 2009 | World Cross Country Championships | Amman, Jordan | 5th | Junior race | |
| 2009 | World Cross Country Championships | Amman, Jordan | 1st | Junior team race | |
| 2010 | World Cross Country Championships | Bydgoszcz, Poland | 3rd | Junior race | |
| 2010 | World Cross Country Championships | Bydgoszcz, Poland | 1st | Junior team race | |
| 2011 | African Cross Country Championships | Cape Town, South Africa | 1st | Junior race | |
| 2011 | African Cross Country Championships | Cape Town, South Africa | 1st | Junior team race | |
| 2012 | African Cross Country Championships | Cape Town, South Africa | 2nd | Junior race | |
| 2012 | African Cross Country Championships | Cape Town, South Africa | 1st | Junior team race | |
| 2013 | World Cross Country Championships | Bydgoszcz, Poland | 1st | Senior race | |
| 2013 | World Cross Country Championships | Bydgoszcz, Poland | 3rd | Senior team race | |
