= Mosinet Geremew =

Ethiopian middle and long-distance runner (born 1992)

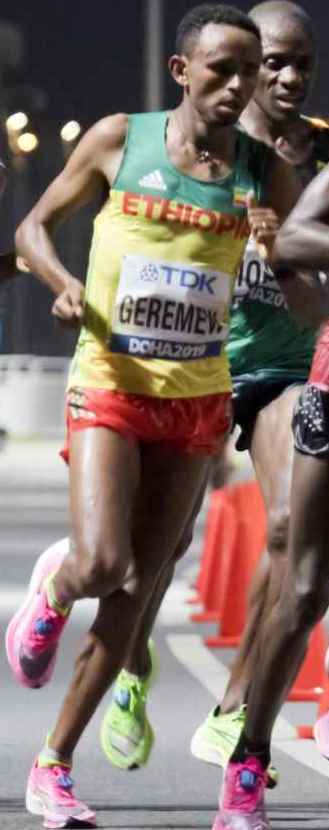
- Geremew in 2019

Personal information
- Nationality: Ethiopian
- Born: 12 February 1992 (age 34)

Sport
- Country: Ethiopia
- Sport: Athletics
- Event: Long-distance running
Medal record
Men's athletics
Representing Ethiopia
World Championships
Silver medal – second place	2019 Doha	Marathon
Silver medal – second place	2022 Eugene	Marathon

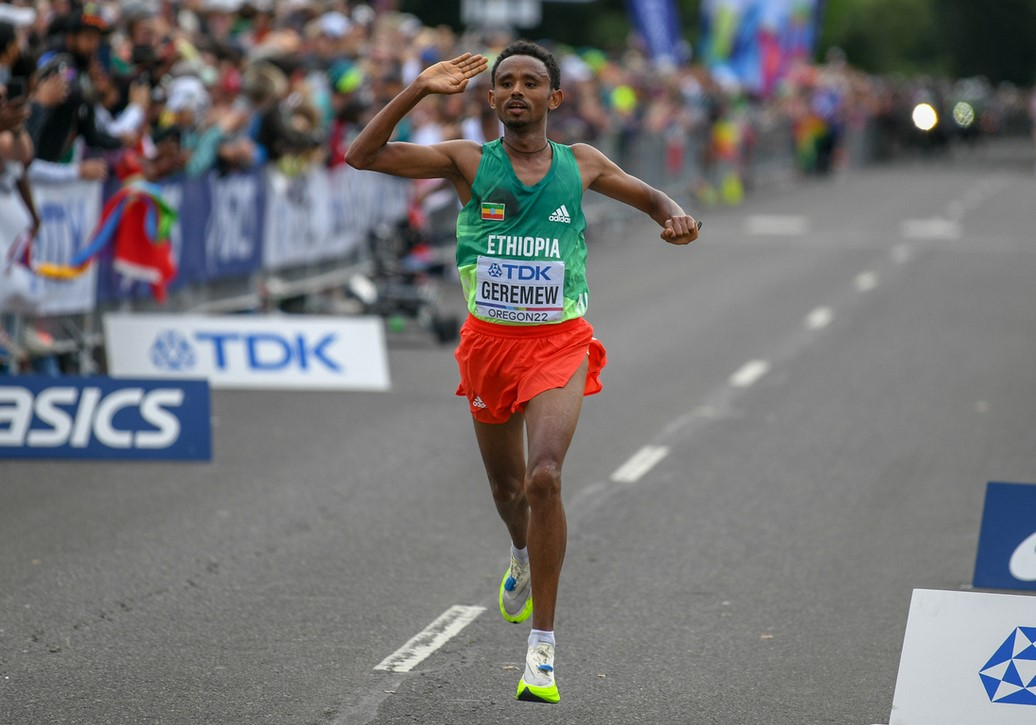
Geremew at the World Championships in Oregon (2022)

Mosinet Geremew (born 12 February 1992) is an Ethiopian middle-distance and long-distance runner.

Mosinet's career started in cross country running. He ran in the junior category at the 2010 IAAF World Cross Country Championships and placed 16th overall – he was not a point-scoring runner for the Ethiopian team. He returned to the same venue (Bydgoszcz) as a senior competitor at the 2013 IAAF World Cross Country Championships, though his 24th-place finish again left him out of the team point scoring. In 2012 he won the 10k Paderborner Osterlauf in Germany in 27:53 min.

He became the first person to win twice at the Yangzhou Jianzhen International Half Marathon, winning four times in a row, including a course record of 59:52 minutes – the fastest achieved in a Chinese race. In 2015 he was the winner of the Ras Al Khaimah Half Marathon.

On 15 May 2016 he won the Bangalore 10k in a time of 28:36, after his victory the previous year. At the 2018 edition of the run, he placed third in a time of 28:39 after fellow countrymen BIrhanu Legese with 28:38 and the winner Geoffrey Kamworor (Kenya) in 28:18.

He achieved bigger popularity in 2018 by winning the Dubai Marathon in a course record time of 2:04:00 (with seven runners below 2:05) as well as a second place in the Chicago Marathon.

At the 2019 London Marathon, he finished in second place behind Eliud Kipchoge with a time of 2:02:55, the third-fastest time in history.

On 17 July 2022, Mosinet won his second World Championship Silver Medal in the 2022 World Athletics Championships – Men's marathon, finishing behind Tamirat Tola in a time of 2:06:44.

== International competitions ==
Year	Competition	Venue	Position	Event	Notes
2010	World Cross Country Championships	Bydgoszcz, Poland	16th	Junior race	23:00
2013	World Cross Country Championships	Bydgoszcz, Poland	24th	Senior race	34:09
2015	World Championships	Beijing, China	11th	10,000 m	28:07.50
2018	Chicago Marathon	Chicago, USA	2nd	Marathon	2:05:24
2019	London Marathon	London, United Kingdom	2nd	Marathon	2:02:55
2019	World Championships	Doha, Qatar	2nd	Marathon	2:10:44
2022	World Championships	Eugene, United States	2nd	Marathon	2:06:44

== Circuit wins ==
- Dubai Marathon: 2018 (2:04:00)
- Yangzhou Jianzhen International Half Marathon: 2015–2018
- Ras Al Khaimah Half Marathon: 2015
- Peachtree Road Race: 2013
- Great Ethiopian Run: 2011

== Personal Bests ==
5,000m	13:17.41	2012	Shanghai
10,000m	27:18.86	2015	Hengelo
Half Marathon	59:11	2014	New Delhi
Marathon	2:02:55	2019	London
