= Hosea Macharinyang =

Kenyan long-distance runner (1986–2021)

Hosea Mwok Macharinyang (12 June 1986 – 9 October 2021) was a Kenyan professional runner who specialized in the 10,000 metres and cross-country running. He won three consecutive team titles with Kenya at the IAAF World Cross Country Championships from 2006 to 2008.

== Career ==
Like many Kenyan elite athletes, Hosea first began running while traveling to and from school. In 2004 he came second in the junior race at the Kenyan Cross Country Championships and was later selected for the world championship team. As a cross country junior athlete he came sixth at the World Cross Championships that year, improving to fourth place the following year. Macharinyang made his first appearances on the track in 2004 and after a fourth place over 10,000 metres at the 2004 World Junior Championships in Athletics, he went on to take the silver medal at the 2005 African Junior Athletics Championships. He moved up to the senior ranks at the 2006 IAAF World Cross Country Championships and helped Kenya to the team medal with his sixth-place finish in the long race. Further team golds came at the 2007 and 2008 events, where he was fifth and eleventh overall, respectively.

He won the 2007 Great Edinburgh Run and made his half marathon debut at the 2008 Stramilano, finishing fifth. An Achilles tendon injury in the middle of 2008 interrupted his career and after five straight international selections for the World Cross Country Championships, he missed the 2009 edition.

He returned to fitness in November 2009 and was the winner of the Tuskys Wareng Cross Country. He came ninth at the 2010 World Cross but missed out on a team placing as the fifth Kenyan finisher. He ran a half marathon best of 1:01:38 hours for fifth at the 2010 Udine Half Marathon. A tenth-place finish at the 2011 IAAF World Cross Country Championships saw him again finish outside of the Kenyan team.

He came third at the 2011 Cross Internacional de Itálica behind fellow Kenyans Leonard Komon and Mathew Kisorio. He was fourth at August's Beach to Beacon 10K and in September he entered the Philadelphia Half Marathon, but was three minutes behind the winner Matthew Kisorio. He returned to cross country in December and finished third at the Cross de la Constitución.

== Achievements ==
Year	Competition	Venue	Position	Event	Notes
Representing Kenya
2004	World Junior Championships	Grosseto, Italy	4th	10,000 m	28:36.50
2006	World Cross Country Championships	Fukuoka, Japan	6th	Long race (12 km)	36:02
2006	World Cross Country Championships	Fukuoka, Japan	1st	Team competition	24 pts
2007	World Cross Country Championships	Mombasa, Kenya	5th	Senior race (12 km)	36:46
2007	World Cross Country Championships	Mombasa, Kenya	1st	Team competition	29 pts
2008	World Cross Country Championships	Edinburgh, Scotland	11th	Senior race (12 km)	35:24
2008	World Cross Country Championships	Edinburgh, Scotland	1st	Team competition	39 pts

=== Personal bests ===
- 3000 metres - 7:46.93 min (2007)
- 5000 metres - 13:09.85 min (2007)
- 10,000 metres - 27:58.41 min (2007)
- Half marathon - 1:01:38 hrs (2010)
