= Lucas Rotich =

Kenyan long-distance runner

Lucas Kimeli Rotich
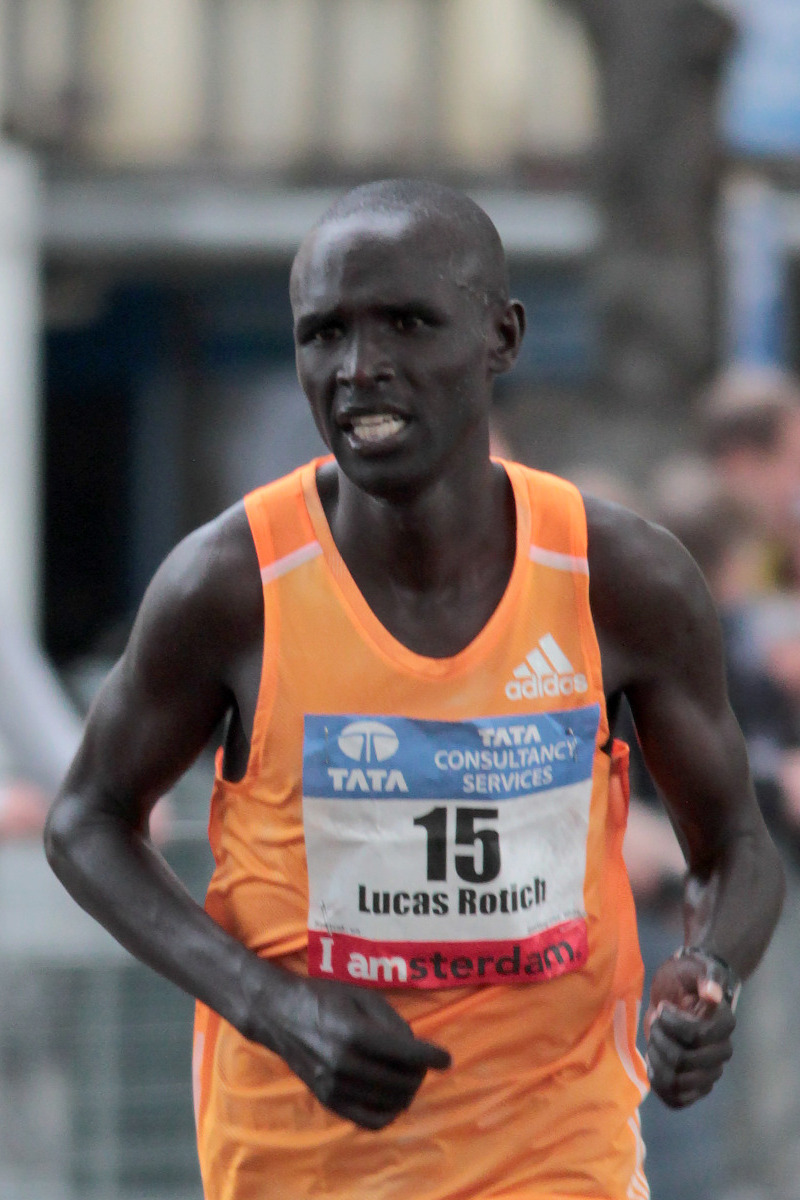
- At the Amsterdam Marathon 2014.
- Updated on 20 October 2014

Lucas Kimeli Rotich (born 16 April 1990), Kapsoiyo Village, Elgeyo Marakwet County is a Kenyan long-distance runner who specializes in the 5000 metres.

He won a silver medal in the 3000 metres at the 2007 World Youth Championships, the bronze medal in the junior race at the 2008 World Cross Country Championships and finished sixth in the 5000 metres at the 2009 World Athletics Final. He ran in the men's race at the 2010 World Cross Country Championships, but finished the race in twelfth position with an injury. After recovering, he set new personal bests over 3000 m, 5000 m and 10,000 m on the European circuit.

He won at the Tuskys Cross Country in November 2010 and was focused on performing well at the 2011 World Cross Country Championships. He had a top three finish at the Cross Internacional Zornotza in January. He failed to qualify for the world cross event and instead changed his focus to road running, completing a half marathon debut at the City-Pier-City Loop in a time of 59:44 minutes for fifth place. He headed to the United States and finished in second place at the Beach to Beacon 10K with a time of 27:56 minutes. He was the 2011 winner of the Falmouth Road Race and finished as runner-up at the Portugal Half Marathon in September. He ran at the Lisbon Half Marathon (the city's other major race) in March and reached third on the podium.

His personal best times are 3:43.64 minutes in the 1500 metres, achieved in May 2008 in Rehlingen; 7:35.57 minutes in the 3000 metres, achieved in May 2011 in Doha; 12:55.06 minutes in the 5000 metres from the 2010 Bislett Games; and 26:43.98 minutes in the 10,000 metres, achieved in September 2011 at the Brussels Diamond League meeting.
