= Abdelmajid El Hissouf =

Moroccan long-distance runner

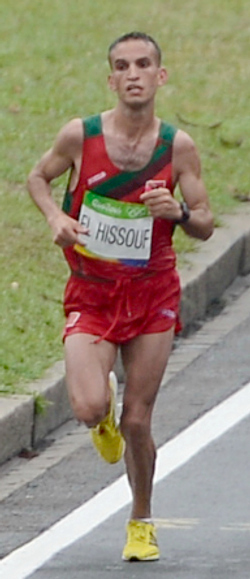
- El Hissouf at the 2016 Olympics

Personal information
- Born: 23 September 1992 (age 33)
- Height: 170 cm (5 ft 7 in)
- Weight: 56 kg (123 lb)

Sport
- Sport: Track and field
- Events: Marathon, half marathon

Achievements and titles
- Personal bests: Marathon – 2:10:35 (2015); HM – 1:02:11 (2015)

Abdelmajid El Hissouf (born 23 September 1992) is a Moroccan long-distance runner. He competed in the marathon at the 2016 Summer Olympics, where he was a full 10 minutes short of his personal best time, finishing 68th. He was later disqualified and suspended for violating anti-doping rules.
