= World 10K Bangalore =

Indian road race

- The logo for World 10K Bengaluru
- Date: Mid-May
- Location: Bengaluru, India
- Event type: Road
- Distance: 10 kilometres
- Primary sponsor: Tata Consultancy Services
- Established: 2008
- Course records: Men's: 27:38 (2022) (Kenya) Nicholas Kimeli; Women's: 30:35 (2022) (Kenya) Irene Cheptai
- Website: World 10K Bangalore

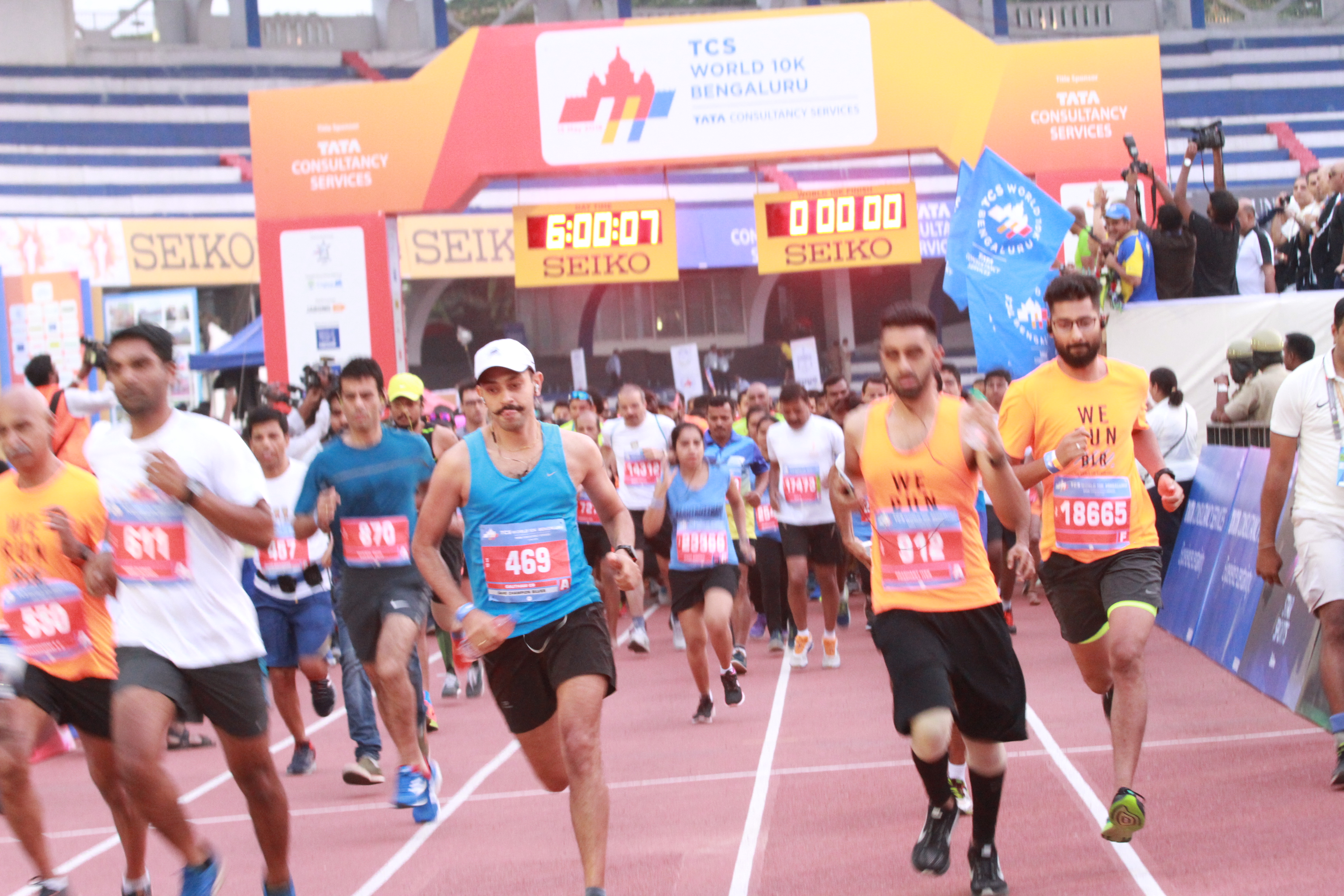
The race starts and finishes at the Sree Kanteerava Stadium

The World 10K Bengaluru (known as the TCS World 10K Bengaluru for sponsorship reasons by Tata Consultancy Services (TCS)) is an annual 10 kilometres road running competition which takes place in Bengaluru, India. The competition was first held in 2008 and usually takes place in late May. The first three editions were sponsored by Sunfeast (ITC Limited).

The race, which is AIMS-certified, begins and ends at the Sree Kanteerava Stadium, after looping through the roads of Bangalore. The different race categories at the event are – World 10K (participation restricted to International and National athletes), Open 10K (participation open to amateur runners), Majja Run (a 5.7 km run meant for fun runners), Senior Citizens’ Run (a 4.2 km run for Senior Citizens), and the Champions with Disability event (a 4.2 km event for persons with disability). In addition to this there also is a 10 km Corporate Champions category in which companies can field a team of 3 members and compete to achieve the best aggregate time.

The event is organised by Procam International, a sport and leisure management firm which is also responsible for the Mumbai Marathon and Delhi Half Marathon. There is a total prize pot of US$170,000 and race winners receive over $21,000 for their victories. Further significant prizes are offered to the best Indian competitors and teams.

The 8th edition was held on 17 May 2015 with French Sprinter Marie Jose Perec as its event ambassador.

The 9th edition was held on 15 May 2016 with track and field athlete Mike Powell as its event ambassador.

== Past winners ==
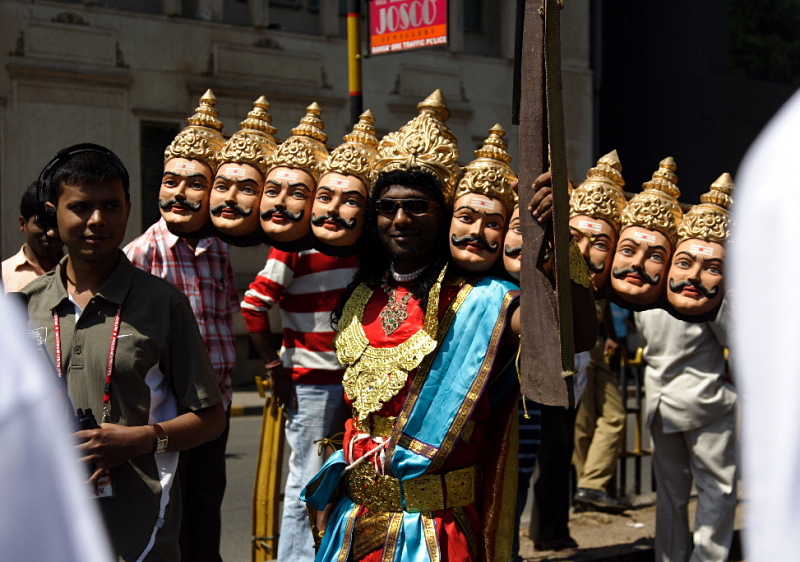
A fun runner in a Ravana costume during the "Majja Run" in 2008

Key: Course record

Edition	Year	Men's winner	Time (m:s)	Women's winner	Time (m:s)
1st	2008	Zersenay Tadese (ERI)	27:51	Elvan Abeylegesse (TUR); Grace Momanyi (KEN)	32:02
2nd	2009	Deriba Merga (ETH)	28:13	Aselefech Mergia (ETH)	32:08
3rd	2010	Titus Mbishei (KEN)	27:54	Wude Ayalew (ETH)	31:58
4th	2011	Philemon Limo (KEN)	28:01	Dire Tune (ETH)	33:19
5th	2012	Geoffrey Kamworor (KEN)	28:00	Helah Kiprop (KEN)	32:22
6th	2013	Alex Korio (KEN)	28:07	Gladys Cherono (KEN)	32:03
7th	2014	Geoffrey Kamworor (KEN)	27:44	Lucy Kabuu (KEN)	31:48
8th	2015	Mosinet Geremew (ETH)	28:16	Mamitu Daska (ETH)	31:57
9th	2016	Mosinet Geremew (ETH)	28:36	Peres Jepchirchir (KEN)	32:15
10th	2017	Alex Korio (KEN)	28:12	Irene Cheptai (KEN)	31:51
11th	2018	Geoffrey Kamworor (KEN)	28:18	Agnes Tirop (KEN)	31:19
12th	2019	Andamlak Belihu (ETH)	27:56	Agnes Tirop (KEN)	33:55
13th	2022	Nicholas Kimeli (KEN)	27:38	Irene Cheptai (KEN)	30:35
14th	2023	Sabastian Sawe (KEN)	27:59	Tsehay Gemechu (ETH)	31:38
15th	2024	Peter Njeru (KEN)	28:14	Lilian Rengeruk (KEN)	30:56
16th	2025	Joshua Cheptegei (UGA)	27:53	Sarah Chelangat (UGA)	31:07
17th	2026	Rodrigue Kwizera (BDI)	27:31	Florence Niyonkuru (RWA)	30:45
