= Lineth Chepkurui =

Kenyan long-distance runner (born 1988)

Lineth Chepkurui (born 23 February 1988 in Bomet) is a Kenyan long-distance runner.

At the 2008 World Cross Country Championships Chepkurui finished eleventh in the individual race, however this was not enough to be a part of the Kenyan team, who won silver medals in the team competition. She won her third consecutive Lilac Bloomsday Run in 2010, running a world's best time over 12 km with her course record run of 38:10. (Note: The International Association of Athletics Federations, the international governing body for the sport of athletics/track and field, does not recognize world records or world bests in either an indoor or outdoor 12 km. The Association of Road Racing Statisticians does recognize a world record in the outdoor 12 km, however, their record keeping rules state: "A record quality course is defined as having not more than 1 m/km net drop between the start and finish and not more than 30% of the race distance separation between that start and finish, e.g. not more than a 3 km separation for a 10 km race [or 3.6 km for a 12 km race]. Records will only be accepted for record quality courses." Per ARRS standards, the course for the Lilac Bloomsday Run fulfills these conditions. Although Chepkurui ran a 38:07 two weeks later on May 16, 2010 at the Bay to Breakers (presumably the fastest 12 km ever for a woman), the course is not considered a "record quality course" in that the start and finish are separated by approximately 10.5 linear kilometers.)

Chepkurui is a two-time champion of the Bay to Breakers 12K. In 2010, her time of 38:07 was a women's course record. She also set a course record at the Beach to Beacon 10K, knocking 26 seconds off the former record to win with a time of 31:00 minutes. She ran at the Falmouth Road Race two weeks later, but was beaten into second place by Wude Ayalew. She entered the Rock 'n' Roll Philadelphia Half Marathon in September and finished as runner-up with a personal best of 1:07:46, two seconds behind Meseret Defar.

Chepkurui trains with Kimbia Athletics and is coached by Dieter Hogen.

== Achievements ==
Year	Competition	Venue	Position	Notes
2008	World Cross Country Championships	Edinburgh, Scotland	12th	Long race
2009	World Cross Country Championships	Amman, Jordan	4th	Long race
2009	World Cross Country Championships	Amman, Jordan	1st	Team
2010	World Cross Country Championships	Bydgoszcz, Poland	5th	Long race
2010	World Cross Country Championships	Bydgoszcz, Poland	1st	Team

=== Road running performances ===
- 2006 Philadelphia Half Marathon - 1st
- Lilac Bloomsday Run - 1st (2008–2010)
- 2008 Cherry Blossom 10-Mile Run - 1st
- 2010 Philadelphia Half Marathon - 2nd

=== Personal bests ===
- 10 Kilometres - 30:51 minutes
- Half marathon - 1:07:46 hrs (2010)
