= Renee Metivier Baillie =

American long-distance runner

Renee Metivier Baillie (born December 25, 1981) is an American long-distance runner who competed at multiple IAAF World Cross Country Championships and finished eighth at the 2012 Chicago Marathon.

== Early life and college ==
Renee Metivier Baillie was born on December 25, 1981, in Highland Village, Texas. In high school, Metivier Baillie was a three-time state champion.

In college, she was an 11-time All-American for the University of Colorado and Georgia Tech.

== Elite career ==
In 2010, Metivier Baillie won the 3000 meters at the USA Indoor Track and Field Championships, but did not compete in the world championships that year.

In 2012, Metivier Baillie won the US 20K championship and finished eighth at the 2012 Chicago Marathon.

In 2016, Metivier Baillie won the US Half marathon trail championship at Lake Padden Trail Half Marathon in Bellingham, Washington.

In 2020, during the COVID-19 lockdown, Metivier broke several treadmill world records during the Chaski Challenge. En route to her 50 km world record of 3:11:42, she set records at the marathon, 2:40:55, and half-marathon, 1:19:29, distances. The old treadmill 50 km record was 3:51:25. The half-marathon record was short-lived, as only a few hours later Sara Hall lowered the mark to 1:09:03.

== World Cross Country Championships Competition record ==
- 2010: 38th (senior race)
- 2008: 49th (senior race)
- 2007: 36th (senior race)
- 2006: 49th (long race)
- 2005: 42nd (long race)

== Sponsorship ==
Metivier Baillie has been sponsored by Nike and Mizuno.
