= Yuka Ando =

Japanese long-distance runner

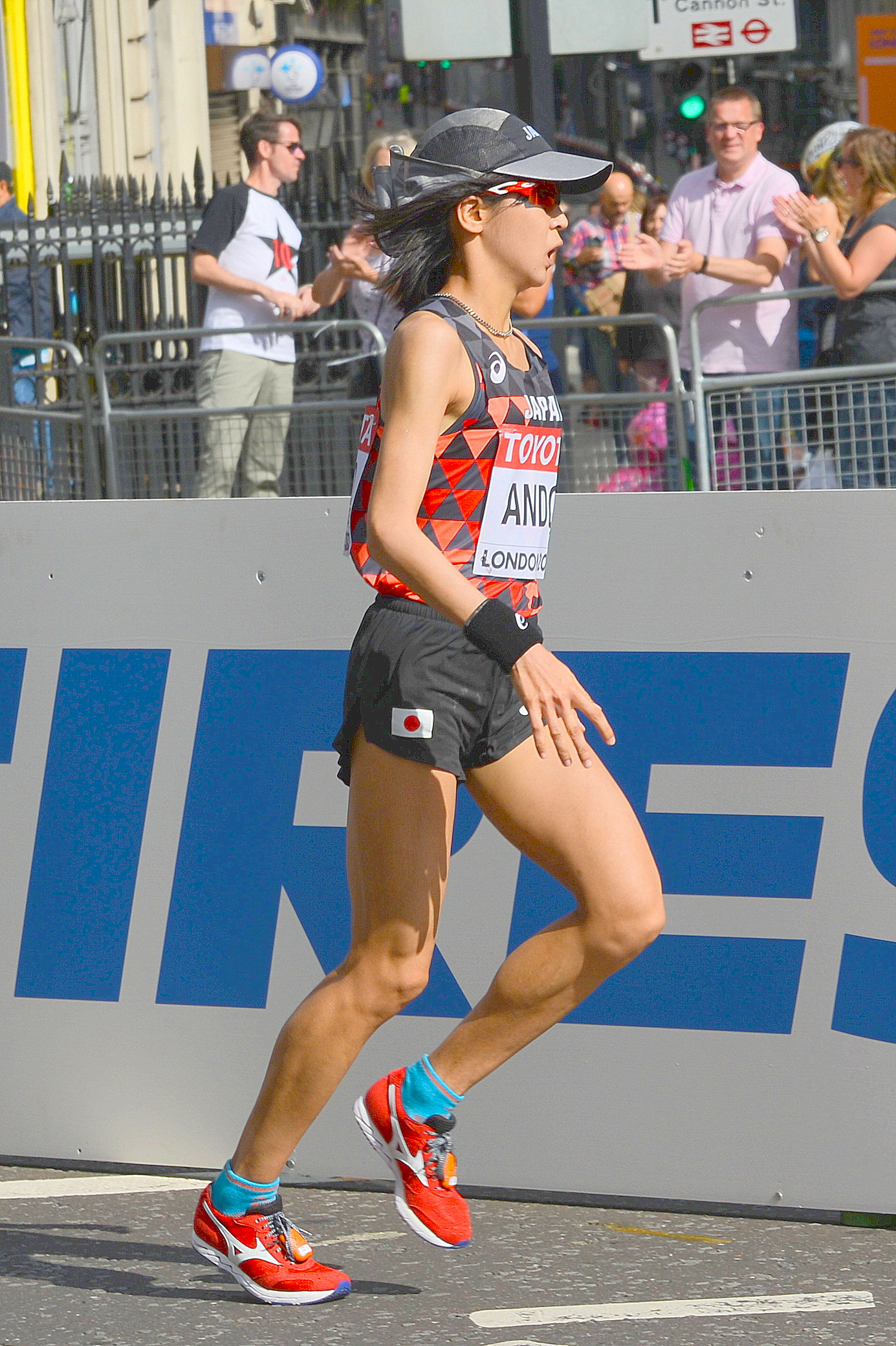
- Ando at 2017 IAAF World Athletics Championships

Personal information
- Native name: 安藤 友香
- Nickname(s): Yukachin, Undo
- Nationality: Japanese
- Born: 16 March 1994 (age 32) Gifu Prefecture, Japan
- Education: Toyokawa High School
- Height: 1.60 m (5 ft 3 in)
- Weight: 42 kg (93 lb)

Sport
- Sport: Long-distance running
- Event: 3000 – Marathon
- Club: Wacoal
- Personal bests: 1500 m: 4:28.35; 3000 m: 9:02.73; 5000 m: 15:32.67; 10,000 m: 31:58.71; 10 km: 32:37; Half marathon: 1:09:38; Marathon: 2:21:36 (2017 Nagoya Women's Marathon)

Yuka Ando (安藤 友香, Andō Yuka; born 16 March 1994) is a Japanese long distance runner. She competed in the women's marathon at the 2017 World Championships in Athletics.
