= Azmeraw Bekele =

Ethiopian long-distance runner (born 1986)

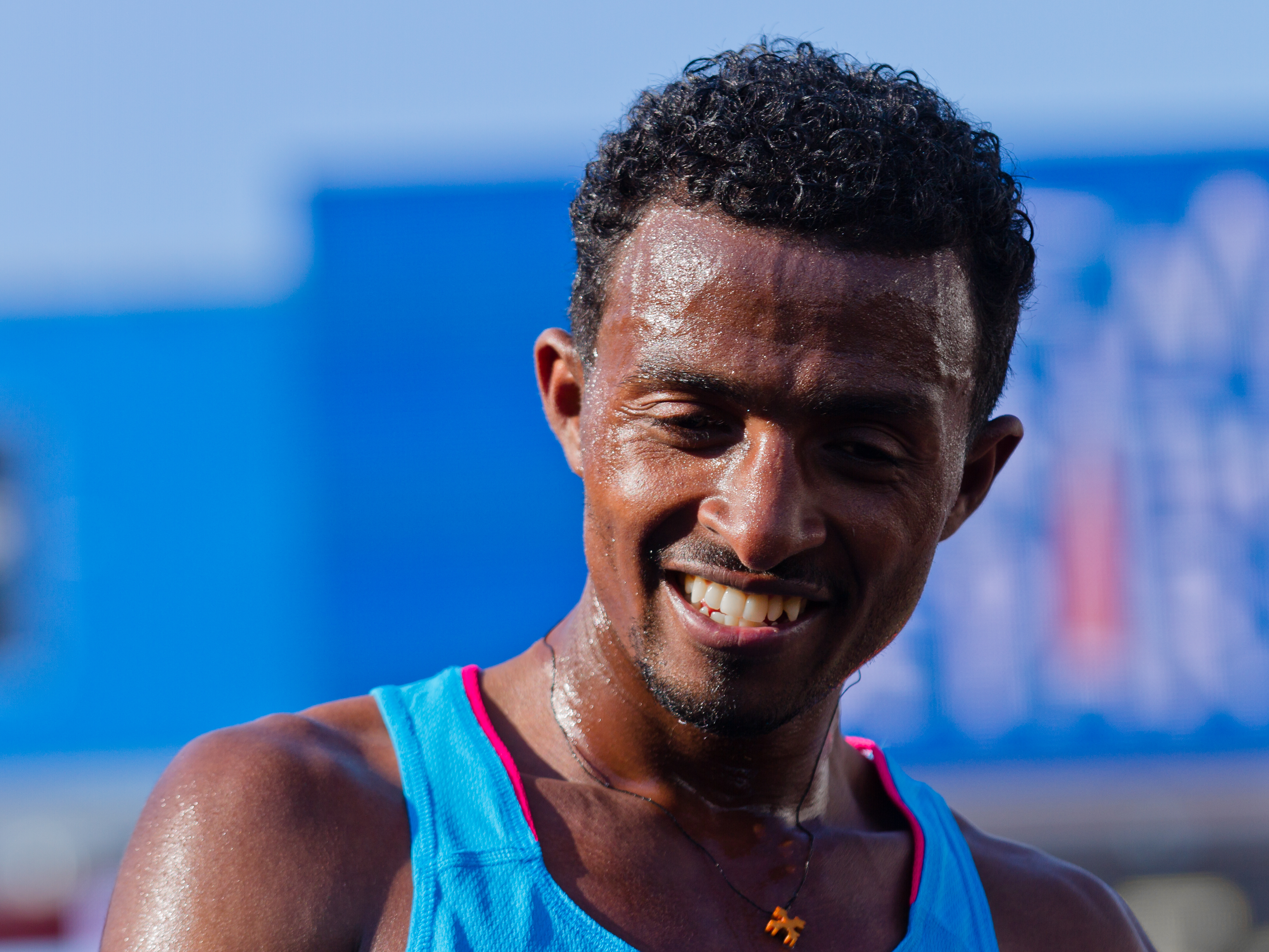
- Azmeraw Bekele Molalign, 2014

Medal record

Representing Ethiopia

Men's athletics

All-Africa Games
Bronze medal – third place	2011 Maputo	10,000 m

Azmeraw Bekele Molalign (born 22 January 1986) is an Ethiopian professional long-distance runner who competes in road running and cross country running competitions.

== Biography ==
He first came to prominence in 2010, which began with a successful cross country season. Representing the Federal Prisons team, he won at the Sululta Cross Country, set a race record of 1:00:57 hours at the Marrakech Half Marathon. and then took a surprise victory at the Jan Meda Cross Country, which served as the national selection event for the 2010 IAAF World Cross Country Championships. At the world event he finished in 21st position, helping the Ethiopian men's team (including Gebregziabher Gebremariam, Abera Kuma and Hunegnaw Mesfin) to the bronze medal.

Later that season, he switched his focus to road events and won the Corrida de Langueux 10K in 28:13 minutes (the second-fastest ever on the course). He won the national 30 km championships at the end of October and secured the Great Ethiopian Run 10K title a month later. He returned to France the following week and made his marathon debut, finishing as runner-up at the Marathon De La Rochelle with a time of 2:10:25 hours. He began his 2011 season on the roads, just missing out on a win at the City-Pier-City Loop behind compatriot Lelisa Desisa, although he set a personal best time of 59:39 minutes for the half marathon. He was also the runner-up at the Prague Half Marathon three weeks later.

He claimed his first national title on the track at the 40th Ethiopian Athletics Championships, defeating Dino Sefer in the 10,000 metres. He ran at the Marseille-Cassis Classique Internationale and was leading mid-race but stopped short after mistaking a timing mat for the finish line. Upon realising his error, he began running again but the stoppage had allowed Atsede Tsegay to take the lead and he ended up in second place. At the 2012 RAK Half Marathon he started the race slowly but increased his pace in the second half to finish as runner-up to Denis Kipruto Koech.

== Personal bests ==
- 10K - 27:43 minutes (2010)
- Half marathon - 59:39 minutes (2011)
- Marathon - 2:07:12 hours (2014)
