= Aster Tesfaye =

Bahraini long-distance runner

Personal information
- Born: 27 October 1990 (age 34)

Sport
- Country: Bahrain
- Sport: Track and field
- Event: Marathon

Aster Tesfaye (born 27 October 1990) is a Bahraini long-distance runner. She competed in the marathon event at the 2015 World Championships in Athletics in Beijing, China.
