= Gebretsadik Abraha =

Ethiopian long-distance runner

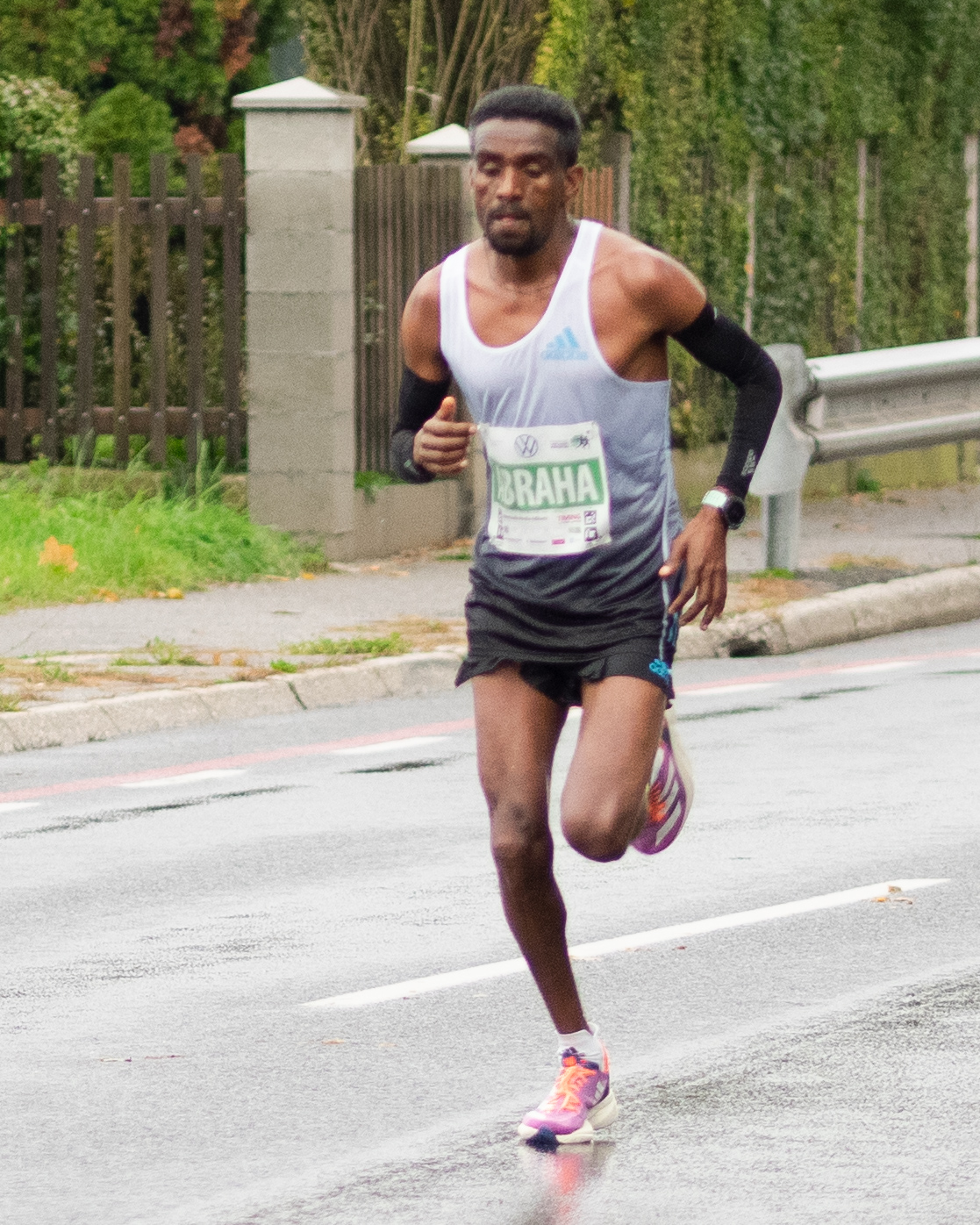
- Abraha on 2022 Ljubljana Marathon

Personal information
- Full name: Gebretsadik Abraha Adihana
- Born: 16 July 1992 (age 33)

Sport
- Country: Ethiopia
- Sport: Long-distance running

Gebretsadik Abraha Adihana (born 16 July 1992) is an Ethiopian long-distance runner. In 2019, he won the Guangzhou Marathon held in Guangzhou, China setting a new course record of 2:08:04.

== Achievements ==
Year	Competition	Venue	Position	Event	Notes
Representing Ethiopia
2017	Marrakech Marathon	Marrakesh, Morocco	1st	Marathon	2:08:55
2017	Prague Marathon	Prague, Czech Republic	1st	Marathon	2:08:47
2018	Los Angeles Marathon	Los Angeles, United States	2nd	Marathon	2:11:57
2018	Ljubljana Marathon	Ljubljana, Slovenia	2nd	Marathon	2:08:36
2019	Guangzhou Marathon	Guangzhou, China	1st	Marathon	2:08:04
2022	Ljubljana Marathon	Ljubljana, Slovenia	1st	Marathon	2:06:09
