= Purity Rionoripo =

Kenyan long-distance runner

Purity Cherotich Rionoripo
Personal information
- Born: 10 June 1993 (age 33)

Sport
- Country: Kenya
- Sport: Long-distance running

Purity Cherotich Rionoripo (born 10 June 1993) is a Kenyan long-distance runner.

She won the Copenhagen Half Marathon in 2015 in 1:08:29 as well as the Lisbon Marathon in 2:25:09. She won the 2017 Paris Marathon with a time of 2:20:55, and the Prague Marathon 2021 "Battle of the Teams" event in 2:20:14.

In December 2022, Rionoripo was issued with a five-year ban for anti-doping rule violations after testing positive for furosemide along with tampering with the investigation.

She is married to Kenyan runner Paul Lonyangata.
