= 2011 IAAF World Cross Country Championships – Junior men's race =

Junior men's race at the 2011 IAAF World Cross Country Championships
- Organisers: IAAF
- Edition: 39th
- Date: March 20
- Host city: Punta Umbría, Andalucía, Spain
- Venue: Polideportivo Antonio Gil Hernández
- Events: 1
- Distances: 8 km – Junior men
- Participation: 109 athletes from 32 nations

The Junior men's race at the 2011 IAAF World Cross Country Championships was held at the Polideportivo Antonio Gil Hernández in Punta Umbría, Spain, on March 20, 2011. Reports of the event were given for the IAAF.

Complete results for individuals, and for teams were published.

== Race results ==
=== Junior men's race (8 km) ===
==== Individual ====
Rank	Athlete	Country	Time
1st place, gold medalist(s)	Geoffrey Kipsang Kamworor	Kenya	22:21
2nd place, silver medalist(s)	Thomas Ayeko	Uganda	22:27
3rd place, bronze medalist(s)	Patrick Mutunga Mwikya	Kenya	22:32
4	Bonsa Dida	Ethiopia	22:39
5	Fikadu Haftu	Ethiopia	22:43
6	James Gitahi Rungaru	Kenya	22:43
7	Muktar Edris	Ethiopia	22:44
8	Yitayal Atnafu	Ethiopia	22:53
9	Jacob Araptany	Uganda	23:03
10	Isiah Kiplangat Koech	Kenya	23:10
11	Tesfaye Cheru	Ethiopia	23:16
12	Samsom Gebreyohannes	Eritrea	23:18
13	Philemon Kipchumba Yator	Kenya	23:19
14	Justine Kiprop Cheruiyot	Kenya	23:19
15	Peter Kibet	Uganda	23:21
16	Merhawi Tadesse	Eritrea	23:21
17	Goitom Kifle	Eritrea	23:24
18	Soufiyan Bouqantar	Morocco	23:25
19	Teshome Tafese	Ethiopia	23:33
20	Tesfagaber Ayahuney	Eritrea	23:35
21	Tsegay Tuemay	Eritrea	23:43
22	Isaac Kemboi Chelimo	Bahrain	23:47
23	Abdelmajid El Hissouf	Morocco	23:49
24	Phillip Kipyego	Uganda	23:50
25	Daniel Rotich	Uganda	23:52
26	William Kaptein	South Africa	23:52
27	Othmane El Goumri	Morocco	23:57
28	Luyanda Qolo	South Africa	23:59
29	Craig Lutz	United States	24:02
30	Weynay Ghebresilasie	Eritrea	24:11
31	Abdelmunaim Yahya Adam	Sudan	24:17
32	Ammar Moussa	United States	24:21
33	Kazuma Kubota	Japan	24:22
34	Jeremy Andreas	South Africa	24:23
35	Merlin Alcardo Klaaste	South Africa	24:23
36	Takashi Ichida	Japan	24:25
37	Genki Yagisawa	Japan	24:34
38	Abdelhadi Labäli	Morocco	24:34
39	Jonathan Hay	United Kingdom	24:35
40	Ethan Heywood	Australia	24:36
41	Glen Yarham	Australia	24:37
42	Yuma Hattori	Japan	24:38
43	Yuki Arimura	Japan	24:40
44	Mansour Haraoui	Algeria	24:43
45	Maxwell Straneva	United States	24:45
46	Ken Yokote	Japan	24:45
47	Justin Vilhauer	United States	24:50
48	Romain Collenot-Spriet	France	24:51
49	Ross Proudfoot	Canada	24:53
50	Il'gizar Safiullin	Russia	24:59
51	Khalid Mohamed Ahmed	Sudan	24:59
52	Rui Pinto	Portugal	25:01
53	Ross Matheson	United Kingdom	25:03
54	Gabriel Navarro	Spain	25:09
55	Maxime Salmeron	France	25:10
56	Ryan Poland	United States	25:12
57	Said Diaz	Mexico	25:13
58	Szymon Kulka	Poland	25:17
59	Ioran Etchechury	Brazil	25:17
60	João Luis Filho	Brazil	25:18
61	Ilyas Salhi	Algeria	25:19
62	Andrey Strizhakov	Russia	25:22
63	Xavier King	Canada	25:24
64	Khemais Abbassi	Tunisia	25:25
65	Hugh Williams	Australia	25:26
66	Angel Ronco	Spain	25:27
67	Benjamin Connor	United Kingdom	25:29
68	Jonathan Darlington	Canada	25:30
69	Fernando Carro	Spain	25:34
70	Mmusu Edwin Sesipi	South Africa	25:35
71	Richard Goodman	United Kingdom	25:37
72	Ian Bailey	United Kingdom	25:40
73	José Luis Rojas	Peru	25:41
74	Taha Gourrida	Tunisia	25:42
75	Joshua Johnson	Australia	25:43
76	Víctor Puyuelo	Spain	25:43
77	Giuseppe Gerratana	Italy	25:44
78	Djilali Bedrani	France	25:50
79	Andrew Kowalsky	Canada	25:53
80	Andrey Rusakov	Russia	25:55
81	Yimer Getahun	Israel	25:58
82	Elsmani Ali Mohammed	Sudan	25:59
83	Robert Denault	Canada	26:01
84	Chouaib Hamdane	Algeria	26:03
85	Selibi Maitiso	Botswana	26:06
86	Mitko Tsenov	Bulgaria	26:06
87	Zinelabedine Mahcene	Algeria	26:07
88	Karim Achengli	Spain	26:11
89	Eduard Krasnov	Russia	26:13
90	Houssem Chaabani	Tunisia	26:14
91	Chol Ubhor	Sudan	26:15
92	Lucirio Antonio Garrido	Venezuela	26:17
93	Paul Janikowski	Canada	26:19
94	Daniel Arce	Spain	26:27
95	Tom Curr	United Kingdom	26:28
96	Walid Lajdal	Tunisia	26:29
97	Guilherme Ademilson Santos	Brazil	26:31
98	Mouloud Madoui	Algeria	26:34
99	Dzianis Piatraha	Belarus	26:47
100	Tha'er Aljohar	Jordan	26:52
101	Nikolai Lialikov	Russia	26:54
102	Stefano Massimi	Italy	26:59
103	Abdelmjid Ed Derraz	Italy	27:19
104	Vitaly Lagushin	Russia	27:20
105	Ataíde de Souza	Brazil	27:21
106	Nilson Tavares	Cape Verde	33:55
—	Erik Olson	United States	DNF
—	Shane Quinn	Ireland	DNF
—	Hicham Sigueni	Morocco	DNF
—	Jaouad Chemlal	Morocco	DNS

==== Teams ====
Rank	Team	Points
1st place, gold medalist(s)	Kenya: Geoffrey Kipsang Kamworor / 1; Patrick Mutunga Mwikya / 3; James Gitahi Rungaru / 6; Isiah Kiplangat Koech / 10; (Philemon Kipchumba Yator) / (13); (Justine Kiprop Cheruiyot) / (14)	20
2nd place, silver medalist(s)	Ethiopia: Bonsa Dida / 4; Fikadu Haftu / 5; Muktar Edris / 7; Yitayal Atnafu / 8; (Tesfaye Cheru) / (11); (Teshome Tafese) / (19)	24
3rd place, bronze medalist(s)	Uganda: Thomas Ayeko / 2; Jacob Araptany / 9; Peter Kibet / 15; Phillip Kipyego / 24; (Daniel Rotich) / (25)	50
4	Eritrea: Samson Gebreyohannes / 12; Merhawi Tadesse / 16; Goitom Kifle / 17; Tesfagaber Ayahuney / 20; (Tsegay Tuemay) / (21); (Weynay Ghebresilasie) / (30)	65
5	Morocco: Soufiyan Bouqantar / 18; Abdelmajid El Hissouf / 23; Othmane El Goumri / 27; Abdelhadi Labäli / 38; (Hicham Sigueni) / (DNF)	106
6	South Africa: William Kaptein / 26; Luyanda Qolo / 28; Jeremy Andreas / 34; Merlin Alcardo Klaaste / 35; (Mmusu Edwin Sesipi) / (70)	123
7	Japan: Kazuma Kubota / 33; Takashi Ichida / 36; Genki Yagisawa / 37; Yuma Hattori / 42; (Yuki Arimura) / (43); (Ken Yokote) / (46)	148
8	United States: Craig Lutz / 29; Ammar Moussa / 32; Maxwell Straneva / 45; Justin Vilhauer / 47; (Ryan Poland) / (56); (Erik Olson) / (DNF)	153
9	Australia: Ethan Heywood / 40; Glen Yarham / 41; Hugh Williams / 65; Joshua Johnson / 75	221
10	United Kingdom: Jonathan Hay / 39; Ross Matheson / 53; Benjamin Connor / 67; Richard Goodman / 71; (Ian Bailey) / (72); (Tom Curr) / (95)	230
11	Sudan: Abdelmunaim Yahya Adam / 31; Khalid Mohamed Ahmed / 51; Elsmani Ali Mohammed / 82; Chol Ubhor / 91	255
12	Canada: Ross Proudfoot / 49; Xavier King / 63; Jonathan Darlington / 68; Andrew Kowalsky / 79; (Robert Denault) / (83); (Paul Janikowski) / (93)	259
13	Spain: Gabriel Navarro / 54; Angel Ronco / 66; Fernando Carro / 69; Víctor Puyuelo / 76; (Karim Achengli) / (88); (Daniel Arce) / (94)	265
14	Algeria: Mansour Haraoui / 44; Ilyas Salhi / 61; Chouaib Hamdane / 84; Zinelabedine Mahcene / 87; (Mouloud Madoui) / (98)	276
15	Russia: Il'gizar Safiullin / 50; Andrey Strizhakov / 62; Andrey Rusakov / 80; Eduard Krasnov / 89; (Nikolai Lialikov) / (101); (Vitaly Lagushin) / (104)	281
16	Brazil: Ioran Etchechury / 59; João Luis Filho / 60; Guilherme Ademilson Santos / 97; Ataíde de Souza / 105	321
17	Tunisia: Khemais Abbassi / 64; Taha Gourrida / 74; Houssem Chaabani / 90; Walid Lajdal / 96	324

- Note: Athletes in parentheses did not score for the team result.

== Participation ==
According to an unofficial count, 109 athletes from 32 countries participated in the Junior men's race. This is in agreement with the official numbers as published.

- Algeria (5)
- Australia (4)
- Bahrain (1)
- Belarus (1)
- Botswana (1)
- Brazil (4)
- Bulgaria (1)
- Canada (6)
- Cape Verde (1)
- Eritrea (6)
- Ethiopia (6)
- France (3)
- Ireland (1)
- Israel (1)
- Italy (3)
- Japan (6)
- Jordan (1)
- Kenya (6)
- Mexico (1)
- Morocco (5)
- Peru (1)
- Poland (1)
- Portugal (1)
- Russia (6)
- South Africa (5)
- Spain (6)
- Sudan (4)
- Tunisia (4)
- Uganda (5)
- United Kingdom (6)
- United States (6)
- Venezuela (1)

== See also ==
- 2011 IAAF World Cross Country Championships – Senior men's race
- 2011 IAAF World Cross Country Championships – Senior women's race
- 2011 IAAF World Cross Country Championships – Junior women's race
