= 2011 IAAF World Cross Country Championships – Senior women's race =

Senior women's race at the 2011 IAAF World Cross Country Championships
- Organisers: IAAF
- Edition: 39th
- Date: March 20
- Host city: Punta Umbría, Andalucía, Spain
- Venue: Polideportivo Antonio Gil Hernández
- Events: 1
- Distances: 8 km – Senior women
- Participation: 102 athletes from 26 nations

The Senior women's race at the 2011 IAAF World Cross Country Championships was held at the Polideportivo Antonio Gil Hernández in Punta Umbría, Spain, on March 20, 2011. Reports of the event were given for the IAAF.

Complete results for individuals, and for teams were published.

== Race results ==
=== Senior women's race (8 km) ===
==== Individual ====
Rank	Athlete	Country	Time
1st place, gold medalist(s)	Vivian Jepkemoi Cheruiyot	Kenya	24:58
2nd place, silver medalist(s)	Linet Chepkwemoi Masai	Kenya	25:07
3rd place, bronze medalist(s)	Shalane Flanagan	United States	25:10
4	Meselech Melkamu	Ethiopia	25:18
5	Priscah Jepleting Cherono	Kenya	25:20
6	Wude Ayalew	Ethiopia	25:21
7	Pauline Chemning Korikwiang	Kenya	25:26
8	Lineth Chepkurui	Kenya	25:28
9	Genzebe Dibaba	Ethiopia	25:36
10	Beleynesh Oljira	Ethiopia	25:40
11	Hiwot Ayalew	Ethiopia	25:42
12	Shitaye Eshete	Bahrain	25:53
13	Sylvia Jebiwott Kibet	Kenya	25:56
14	Charlotte Purdue	United Kingdom	26:03
15	Merima Mohammed	Ethiopia	26:24
16	Fionnuala Britton	Ireland	26:25
17	Molly Huddle	United States	26:26
18	Magdalena Lewy-Boulet	United States	26:27
19	Blake Russell	United States	26:30
20	Sara Moreira	Portugal	26:31
21	Hatti Dean	United Kingdom	26:35
22	Juliet Chekwel	Uganda	26:37
23	Maryam Yusuf Jamal	Bahrain	26:39
24	Nuria Fernández	Spain	26:39
25	Kareema Jasim	Bahrain	26:40
26	Hitomi Niiya	Japan	26:43
27	Tejitu Daba	Bahrain	26:45
28	Alissa McKaig	United States	26:46
29	Lara Tamsett	Australia	26:48
30	Genzeb Shumi	Bahrain	26:58
31	René Kalmer	South Africa	27:02
32	Janet Achola	Uganda	27:03
33	Hanae Tanaka	Japan	27:03
34	Nadia Ejjafini	Italy	27:03
35	Alia Saeed Mohammed	United Arab Emirates	27:04
36	Rkia Moukim	Morocco	27:04
37	Stevie Stockton	United Kingdom	27:06
38	Viola Chemos	Uganda	27:09
39	Christine Bardelle	France	27:14
40	Lisa Koll	United States	27:15
41	Eloise Wellings	Australia	27:16
42	Alessandra Aguilar	Spain	27:16
43	Fatiha Klilech-Fauvel	France	27:18
44	Dina Lebo Phalula	South Africa	27:23
45	Nazret Weldu	Eritrea	27:23
46	Naomi Taschimowitz	United Kingdom	27:23
47	Bouchra Sahli	Morocco	27:26
48	Yuko Shimizu	Japan	27:27
49	Bouchra Chaâbi	Morocco	27:28
50	Alba García	Spain	27:29
51	Elena Romagnolo	Italy	27:31
52	Rehaset Mehari	Eritrea	27:31
53	Korei Omata	Japan	27:31
54	Gemma Steel	United Kingdom	27:32
55	Safa Aissaoui	Tunisia	27:38
56	Rebecca Cheptegei	Uganda	27:38
57	Oneile Dintwe	Botswana	27:39
58	Tatiele Roberta de Carvalho	Brazil	27:39
59	Julia Bleasdale	United Kingdom	27:39
60	Annerien Van Schalkwyk	South Africa	27:40
61	Nebiat Habtemariam	Eritrea	27:41
62	Betlhem Desalegn	United Arab Emirates	27:44
63	Tebogo Masehla	South Africa	27:46
64	Diana Martín	Spain	27:47
65	Ercília Machado	Portugal	27:52
66	Annet Negesa	Uganda	27:56
67	Anália Rosa	Portugal	27:57
68	Jacqueline Martín	Spain	27:58
69	Kaila McKnight	Australia	27:59
70	Clémence Calvin	France	28:01
71	Jessica Trengove	Australia	28:02
72	Daniela Cunha	Portugal	28:02
73	Laila Soufyane	Italy	28:03
74	Gema Barrachina	Spain	28:04
75	Fiori Asefaw	Eritrea	28:10
76	Nanae Kuwashiro	Japan	28:16
77	Anna Thompson	Australia	28:19
78	Carla Salomé Rocha	Portugal	28:25
79	Lebogang Phalula	South Africa	28:29
80	Aster Tesfaye	Bahrain	28:29
81	Hanane Ouhaddou	Morocco	28:30
82	Camila Aparecida dos Santos	Brazil	28:32
83	Claudette Mukasakindi	Rwanda	28:33
84	Mapaseka Makhanya	South Africa	28:36
85	Ai Igarashi	Japan	28:37
86	Leonora Joy	New Zealand	28:44
87	Ava Hutchinson	Ireland	28:50
88	Kathryn Harrison	Canada	28:51
89	Xu Lihong	China	28:55
90	Safa Jammeli	Tunisia	28:57
91	Veronica Inglese	Italy	29:02
92	Filomena Costa	Portugal	29:04
93	Angeline Nyiransabimana	Rwanda	29:20
94	Fiona Crombie	New Zealand	29:27
95	Fatna Maraoui	Italy	29:59
96	Maria Lúcia Moraes	Brazil	30:17
97	Sarah Biss	New Zealand	30:47
98	Faithy Nyasango	Zimbabwe	31:15
99	Mahbouba Belgacem	Tunisia	31:44
100	Narjes Issaoui	Tunisia	32:10
101	Simone Zapha	Seychelles	36:19
—	Btissam Lakhouad	Morocco	DNF
—	Fatima Ayachi	Morocco	DNS
—	Simone da Silva	Brazil	DNS

==== Teams ====
Rank	Team	Points
1st place, gold medalist(s)	Kenya: Vivian Jepkemoi Cheruiyot / 1; Linet Chepkwemoi Masai / 2; Priscah Jepleting Cherono / 5; Pauline Chemning Korikwiang / 7; (Lineth Chepkurui) / (8); (Sylvia Jebiwott Kibet) / (13)	15
2nd place, silver medalist(s)	Ethiopia: Meselech Melkamu / 4; Wude Ayalew / 6; Genzebe Dibaba / 9; Beleynesh Oljira / 10; (Hiwot Ayalew) / (11); (Merima Mohammed) / (15)	29
3rd place, bronze medalist(s)	United States: Shalane Flanagan / 3; Molly Huddle / 17; Magdalena Lewy-Boulet / 18; Blake Russell / 19; (Alisa McKaig) / (28); (Lisa Koll) / (40)	57
4	Bahrain: Shitaye Eshete / 12; Maryam Yusuf Jamal / 23; Kareema Jasim / 25; Tejitu Daba / 27; (Genzeb Shumi) / (30); (Aster Tesfaye) / (80)	87
5	United Kingdom: Charlotte Purdue / 14; Hatti Dean / 21; Stevie Stockton / 37; Naomi Taschimowitz / 46; (Gemma Steel) / (54); (Julia Bleasdale) / (59)	116
6	Uganda: Juliet Chekwel / 22; Janet Achola / 32; Viola Chemos / 38; Rebecca Cheptegei / 56; (Annet Negesa) / (66)	146
7	Japan: Hitomi Niiya / 26; Hanae Tanaka / 33; Yuko Shimizu / 48; Korei Omata / 53; (Nanae Kuwashiro) / (76); (Ai Igarashi) / (85)	160
8	Spain: Nuria Fernández / 24; Alessandra Aguilar / 42; Alba García / 50; Diana Martín / 64; (Jacqueline Martín) / (68); (Gema Barrachina) / (74)	180
9	South Africa: René Kalmer / 31; Dina Lebo Phalula / 44; Annerien Van Schalkwyk / 60; Tebogo Masehla / 63; (Lebogang Phalula) / (79); (Mapaseka Makhanya) / (84)	198
10	Australia: Lara Tamsett / 29; Eloise Wellings / 41; Kaila McKnight / 69; Jessica Trengove / 71; (Anna Thompson) / (77)	210
11	Morocco: Rkia Moukim / 36; Bouchra Sahli / 47; Bouchra Chaâbi / 49; Hanane Ouhaddou / 81; (Btissam Lakhouad) / (DNF)	213
12	Portugal: Sara Moreira / 20; Ercília Machado / 65; Anália Rosa / 67; Daniela Cunha / 72; (Carla Salomé Rocha) / (78); (Filomena Costa) / (92)	224
13	Eritrea: Nazret Weldu / 45; Rehaset Mehari / 52; Nebiat Habtemariam / 61; Fiori Asefaw / 75	233
14	Italy: Nadia Ejjafini / 34; Elena Romagnolo / 51; Laila Soufyane / 73; Veronica Inglese / 91; (Fatna Maraoui) / (95)	249
15	Tunisia: Safa Aissaoui / 55; Safa Jammeli / 90; Mahbouba Belgacem / 99; Narjes Issaoui / 100	344

- Note: Athletes in parentheses did not score for the team result.

== Participation ==
According to an unofficial count, 102 athletes from 26 countries participated in the Senior women's race. This is in agreement with the official numbers as published.

- Australia (5)
- Bahrain (6)
- Botswana (1)
- Brazil (3)
- Canada (1)
- China (1)
- Eritrea (4)
- Ethiopia (6)
- France (3)
- Ireland (2)
- Italy (5)
- Japan (6)
- Kenya (6)
- Morocco (5)
- New Zealand (3)
- Portugal (6)
- Rwanda (2)
- Seychelles (1)
- South Africa (6)
- Spain (6)
- Tunisia (4)
- Uganda (5)
- United Arab Emirates (2)
- United Kingdom (6)
- United States (6)
- Zimbabwe (1)

== See also ==
- 2011 IAAF World Cross Country Championships – Senior men's race
- 2011 IAAF World Cross Country Championships – Junior men's race
- 2011 IAAF World Cross Country Championships – Junior women's race
