= 2011 IAAF World Cross Country Championships – Junior women's race =

Junior women's race at the 2011 IAAF World Cross Country Championships
- Organisers: IAAF
- Edition: 39th
- Date: March 20
- Host city: Punta Umbría, Andalucía, Spain
- Venue: Polideportivo Antonio Gil Hernández
- Events: 1
- Distances: 6 km – Junior women
- Participation: 92 athletes from 28 nations

The Junior women's race at the 2011 IAAF World Cross Country Championships was held at the Polideportivo Antonio Gil Hernández in Punta Umbría, Spain, on March 20, 2011. Reports of the event were given for the IAAF.

Complete results for individuals, and for teams were published.

== Race results ==
=== Junior women's race (6 km) ===
==== Individual ====
Rank	Athlete	Country	Time
1st place, gold medalist(s)	Faith Chepngetich Kipyegon	Kenya	18:53
2nd place, silver medalist(s)	Genet Yalew	Ethiopia	18:54
3rd place, bronze medalist(s)	Azemra Gebru	Ethiopia	18:54
4	Waganesh Mekasha	Ethiopia	18:59
5	Janeth Kisa	Kenya	19:08
6	Nancy Chepkwemoi	Kenya	19:20
7	Purity Cherotich Rionoripo	Kenya	19:24
8	Emebet Anteneh	Ethiopia	19:29
9	Brillian Jepkorir Kipkoech	Kenya	19:33
10	Buze Diriba	Ethiopia	19:34
11	Alem Mokonnin	Ethiopia	19:39
12	Katsuki Suga	Japan	19:49
13	Tomoka Kimura	Japan	19:56
14	Mekdes Woldu	Eritrea	19:59
15	Emelia Gorecka	United Kingdom	20:03
16	Naom Chepngeno Mitei	Kenya	20:07
17	Aisling Cuffe	United States	20:15
18	Nancy Cheptegei	Uganda	20:17
19	Katie Flood	United States	20:18
20	Phanice Chemutai	Uganda	20:19
21	Celia Sullohern	Australia	20:20
22	Annabel Gummow	United Kingdom	20:20
23	Yuriko Kosaki	Japan	20:23
24	Yohama Zemuy	Eritrea	20:24
25	Luula Berhane	Eritrea	20:29
26	Fikadu Tsegay	Eritrea	20:31
27	Risa Yokoe	Japan	20:31
28	Molly Grabill	United States	20:40
29	Louise Small	United Kingdom	20:41
30	Risa Shibuya	Japan	20:48
31	Fadwa Sidi Madane	Morocco	20:56
32	Amela Terzić	Serbia	20:56
33	Doreen Sande	Uganda	20:58
34	Natsumi Yoshida	Japan	21:00
35	Amina Tahiri	Morocco	21:08
36	Hadda Souadia	Algeria	21:11
37	Kefilwe Galeitsiwe	Botswana	21:11
38	Hanane Qallouj	Morocco	21:14
39	Stella Chesang	Uganda	21:16
40	Georgia Peel	United Kingdom	21:21
41	Darine Benamer	Algeria	21:24
42	Hayat Allaoui	Morocco	21:25
43	Charo Inga	Peru	21:28
44	Khonzeni Gwegwa	South Africa	21:29
45	Beth Carter	United Kingdom	21:34
46	Priska Auf Der Maur	Switzerland	21:37
47	Sylvia Kedireng Tshetlanyana	South Africa	21:39
48	Riham Senani	Algeria	21:40
49	Susana Godinho	Portugal	21:41
50	Aleli Aparicio	Peru	21:41
51	Letitia Saayman	South Africa	21:42
52	Caroline Pfister	Canada	21:43
53	Vianney Villanueva	Mexico	21:49
54	Zenobie Vangansbeke	Belgium	21:50
55	Nabila Madoui	Algeria	21:53
56	Carise Thompson	Canada	21:54
57	Caroline Thilivhali Marandela	South Africa	21:56
58	Luz Mery Rojas	Peru	21:56
59	Thamani Tawanda	Botswana	21:58
60	Anca Maria Bunea	Romania	21:58
61	Maria Bernard	Canada	22:00
62	Beatriz Caspar	Spain	22:01
63	Ciara Kary	Canada	22:02
64	Soukaina Atanane	Morocco	22:06
65	Fiona Benson	Canada	22:07
66	Ruth Haynes	United Kingdom	22:08
67	Jovana de la Cruz	Peru	22:09
68	María José Pérez	Spain	22:10
69	Marion Guillemin	France	22:12
70	Justyna Jendro	Poland	22:14
71	Liteboho Makhatseane	Lesotho	22:15
72	Nina Savina	Belarus	22:16
73	Emily Driedger	Canada	22:17
74	Thandeka Emily Manzana	South Africa	22:23
75	Nabila Chaib Draa	Algeria	22:23
76	Loubna Zeroukhi	Algeria	22:23
77	Blanca Fernández	Spain	22:36
78	Rafika Abdennebi	Tunisia	22:40
79	Ahlam Zinadi	Morocco	22:41
80	Hallouma Jerfel	Tunisia	22:45
81	Julie Nacouzi	United States	22:46
82	Selma Kaddachi	Tunisia	22:53
83	Letizia Titon	Italy	22:59
84	Hannah Valenzuela	United States	23:04
85	Sara Ruiz	Spain	23:11
86	Patricia Cueto	Spain	23:26
87	Thato Makhafola	South Africa	23:32
88	Irene Sánchez	Spain	23:54
89	Nesrine Ben Khemissa	Tunisia	24:20
90	Rasha Ayoub	Jordan	24:59
91	Nour Sioud	Tunisia	26:11
—	Sierra Vega	United States	DNF

==== Teams ====
Rank	Team	Points
1st place, gold medalist(s)	Ethiopia: Genet Yalew / 2; Azemra Gebru / 3; Waganesh Mekasha / 4; Emebet Anteneh / 8; (Buze Diriba) / (10); (Alem Mokonnin) / (11)	17
2nd place, silver medalist(s)	Kenya: Faith Chepngetich Kipyegon / 1; Janeth Kisa / 5; Nancy Chepkwemoi / 6; Purity Cherotich Rionoripo / 7; (Brillian Jepkorir Kipkoech) / (9); (Naom Chepngeno Mitei) / (16)	19
3rd place, bronze medalist(s)	Japan: Katsuki Suga / 12; Tomoka Kimura / 13; Yuriko Kosaki / 23; Risa Yokoe / 27; (Risa Shibuya) / (30); (Natsumi Yoshida) / (34)	75
4	Eritrea: Mekdes Woldu / 14; Yohama Zemuy / 24; Luula Berhane / 25; Fikadu Tsegay / 26	89
5	United Kingdom: Emelia Gorecka / 15; Annabel Gummow / 22; Louise Small / 29; Georgia Peel / 40; (Beth Carter) / (45); (Ruth Haynes) / (66)	106
6	Uganda: Nancy Cheptegei / 18; Phanice Chemutai / 20; Doreen Sande / 33; Stella Chesang / 39	110
7	United States: Aisling Cuffe / 17; Katie Flood / 19; Molly Grabill / 28; Julie Nacouzi / 81; (Hannah Valenzuela) / (84); (Sierra Vega) / (DNF)	145
8	Morocco: Fadwa Sidi Madane / 31; Amina Tahiri / 35; Hanane Qallouj / 38; Hayat Allaoui / 42; (Soukaina Atanane) / (64); (Ahlam Zinadi) / (79)	146
9	Algeria: Hadda Souadia / 36; Darine Benamer / 41; Riham Senani / 48; Nabila Madoui / 55; (Nabila Chaib Draa) / (75); (Loubna Zeroukhi) / (76)	180
10	South Africa: Khonzeni Gwegwa / 44; Sylvia Kedireng Tshetlanyana / 47; Letitia Saayman / 51; Caroline Thilivhali Marandela / 57; (Thandeka Emily Manzana) / (74); (Thato Makhafola) / (87)	199
11	Peru: Charo Inga / 43; Aleli Aparicio / 50; Luz Mery Rojas / 58; Jovana de la Cruz / 67	218
12	Canada: Caroline Pfister / 52; Carise Thompson / 56; Maria Bernard / 61; Ciara Kary / 63; (Fiona Benson) / (65); (Emily Driedger) / (73)	232
13	Spain: Beatriz Caspar / 62; María José Pérez / 68; Blanca Fernández / 77; Sara Ruiz / 85; (Patricia Cueto) / (86); (Irene Sánchez) / (88)	292
14	Tunisia: Rafika Abdennebi / 78; Hallouma Jerfel / 80; Selma Kaddachi / 82; Nesrine Ben Khemissa / 89; (Nour Sioud) / (91)	329

- Note: Athletes in parentheses did not score for the team result.

== Participation ==
According to an unofficial count, 92 athletes from 28 countries participated in the Junior women's race. This is in agreement with the official numbers as published.

- Algeria (6)
- Australia (1)
- Belarus (1)
- Belgium (1)
- Botswana (2)
- Canada (6)
- Eritrea (4)
- Ethiopia (6)
- France (1)
- Italy (1)
- Japan (6)
- Jordan (1)
- Kenya (6)
- Lesotho (1)
- Mexico (1)
- Morocco (6)
- Peru (4)
- Poland (1)
- Portugal (1)
- Romania (1)
- Serbia (1)
- South Africa (6)
- Spain (6)
- Switzerland (1)
- Tunisia (5)
- Uganda (4)
- United Kingdom (6)
- United States (6)

== See also ==
- 2011 IAAF World Cross Country Championships – Senior men's race
- 2011 IAAF World Cross Country Championships – Junior men's race
- 2011 IAAF World Cross Country Championships – Senior women's race
