= 2011 IAAF World Cross Country Championships – Senior men's race =

Senior men's race at the 2011 IAAF World Cross Country Championships
- Organisers: IAAF
- Edition: 39th
- Date: March 20
- Host city: Punta Umbría, Andalucía, Spain
- Venue: Polideportivo Antonio Gil Hernández
- Events: 1
- Distances: 12 km – Senior men
- Participation: 120 athletes from 35 nations

The Senior men's race at the 2011 IAAF World Cross Country Championships was held at the Polideportivo Antonio Gil Hernández in Punta Umbría, Spain, on March 20, 2011. Reports of the event were given for the IAAF.

Complete results for individuals, and for teams were published.

== Race results ==
=== Senior men's race (12 km) ===
==== Individual ====
Rank	Athlete	Country	Time
1st place, gold medalist(s)	Imane Merga	Ethiopia	33:50
2nd place, silver medalist(s)	Paul Kipngetich Tanui	Kenya	33:52
3rd place, bronze medalist(s)	Vincent Kiprop Chepkok	Kenya	33:53
4	Mathew Kipkoech Kisorio	Kenya	33:55
5	Geoffrey Kiprono Mutai	Kenya	34:03
6	Stephen Kiprotich	Uganda	34:07
7	Philemon Kimeli Limo	Kenya	34:21
8	Hunegnaw Mesfin	Ethiopia	34:25
9	Ali Hasan Mahboob	Bahrain	34:30
10	Hosea Mwok Macharinyang	Kenya	34:30
11	Moses Ndiema Kipsiro	Uganda	34:31
12	Dino Sefir	Ethiopia	34:35
13	Geofrey Kusuro	Uganda	35:06
14	Teklemariam Medhin	Eritrea	35:08
15	Stephen Mokoka	South Africa	35:10
16	Ayad Lamdassem	Spain	35:12
17	Feyisa Lilesa	Ethiopia	35:13
18	Adhanom Abraha	Eritrea	35:28
19	Dickson Huru	Uganda	35:31
20	Rabah Aboud	Algeria	35:33
21	Craig Mottram	Australia	35:33
22	Moses Kibet	Uganda	35:34
23	Sidi-Hassan Chahdi	France	35:35
24	Amanuel Mesel	Eritrea	35:38
25	Tshamano Setone	South Africa	35:38
26	Sindre Buraas	Norway	35:38
27	Juan Carlos Romero	Mexico	35:42
28	Dejene Regassa	Bahrain	35:43
29	Kgosi Tsosane	South Africa	35:48
30	Bilisuma Shugi	Bahrain	35:49
31	Carles Castillejo	Spain	35:52
32	Youssef Aakaou	Spain	35:53
33	Gervais Hakizimana	Rwanda	35:54
34	Khoudir Aggoune	Algeria	35:55
35	Ben True	United States	35:56
36	Sondre Nordstad Moen	Norway	35:58
37	Adil Rached	Morocco	36:01
38	Kiflom Sium	Eritrea	36:02
39	Max King	United States	36:02
40	José Rocha	Portugal	36:05
41	David McNeill	Australia	36:06
42	Ahmed Messeles	Algeria	36:09
43	Moorosi Soke	South Africa	36:11
44	Mulue Andom	Eritrea	36:12
45	Hirotaka Tamura	Japan	36:12
46	Belete Assefa	Ethiopia	36:13
47	Manuel Damião	Portugal	36:17
48	Miguel Barzola	Argentina	36:22
49	Yusuke Takabayashi	Japan	36:26
50	Anis Selmouni	Morocco	36:29
51	Ahmed Naïli	Algeria	36:29
52	Philipp Bandi	Switzerland	36:30
53	Steffen Uliczka	Germany	36:31
54	Brent Vaughn	United States	36:32
55	Dabaya Badhaso	Norway	36:36
56	Cameron Levins	Canada	36:36
57	Andrew Vernon	United Kingdom	36:38
58	Kelly Wiebe	Canada	36:39
59	Ben St.Lawrence	Australia	36:41
60	Jake Robertson	New Zealand	36:41
61	Wissem Hosni	Tunisia	36:42
62	Edwin Chebii Kimurer	Bahrain	36:44
63	Thomas Humphries	United Kingdom	36:47
64	Abdellah Tagharrafet	Morocco	36:47
65	Marco Morgado	Portugal	36:48
66	Licinio Pimentel	Portugal	36:50
67	Andrew Carlson	United States	36:52
68	Alemu Bekele	Bahrain	36:55
69	Ahmed El Mazoury	Italy	37:00
70	Arturo Casado	Spain	37:00
71	Eric Sebahire	Rwanda	37:03
72	Luke Gunn	United Kingdom	37:06
73	Leandro de Oliveira	Brazil	37:10
74	Brian Olinger	United States	37:14
75	Abdelhadi El Mouaziz	Morocco	37:19
76	James Walsh	United Kingdom	37:20
77	Andrew Bumbalough	United States	37:24
78	Israel dos Anjos	Brazil	37:28
79	Liam Adams	Australia	37:29
80	Zhang Zhenlong	China	37:30
81	Morten Munkholm	Denmark	37:33
82	Ryan McLeod	United Kingdom	37:35
83	Tsubasa Hayakawa	Japan	37:37
84	Mounir Miout	Algeria	37:39
85	Tetsuya Yoroizaka	Japan	37:40
86	Tsepo Ramonene	Lesotho	37:43
87	Clodoaldo da Silva	Brazil	37:51
88	Éderson Pereira	Brazil	37:55
89	Ricardo Serrano	Spain	37:56
90	Derek Hawkins	United Kingdom	38:01
91	Hassan Hirt	France	38:05
92	Zane Robertson	New Zealand	38:08
93	Avelino Dumbo	Angola	38:15
94	Lars Erik Malde	Norway	38:18
95	Patrick Nasti	Italy	38:25
96	Javier Carriqueo	Argentina	38:29
97	Barry Britt	Canada	38:31
98	Alex Genest	Canada	38:35
99	Jon Rankin	Cayman Islands	38:44
100	Xolisa Tyali	South Africa	39:20
101	Hans Kristian Fløystad	Norway	39:43
102	Gao Laiyuan	China	39:51
103	Yolo Nikolov	Bulgaria	39:57
104	Derek Snider	Canada	40:21
105	Lungisa Mdedelwa	South Africa	40:22
106	Alex Parlane	New Zealand	40:39
107	Gaylord Silly	Seychelles	40:56
108	Sotiboldi Haitov	Tajikistan	41:10
109	Antoine Simon Labiche	Seychelles	41:31
110	Roberto Mandje	Equatorial Guinea	41:54
—	Clinton Perrett	Australia	DNF
—	Joilson da Silva	Brazil	DNF
—	Tareq Mubarak Taher	Bahrain	DNF
—	Antonio David Jiménez	Spain	DNF
—	Hafid Chani	Morocco	DNF
—	Najim El Gady	Morocco	DNF
—	Yousef El Kalai	Portugal	DNF
—	Samuel Tsegay	Eritrea	DQ^{‡}
—	Abera Kuma	Ethiopia	DQ^{‡}
—	Nuno Costa	Portugal	DQ^{†}
—	Qusay Hasan	Iraq	DNS
—	Samson Idiata	Nigeria	DNS

^{†}: Athlete disqualified due to IAAF Rule 40.1 - anti-doping rule violation
^{‡}: Athletes disqualified due to IAAF Rule 125.5 - unsporting conduct

==== Teams ====
Rank	Team	Points
1st place, gold medalist(s)	Kenya: Paul Kipngetich Tanui / 2; Vincent Kiprop Chepkok / 3; Mathew Kipkoech Kisorio / 4; Geoffrey Kiprono Mutai / 5; (Philemon Kimeli Limo) / (7); (Hosea Mwok Macharinyang) / (10)	14
2nd place, silver medalist(s)	Ethiopia: Imane Merga / 1; Hunegnaw Mesfin / 8; Dino Sefir / 12; Feyisa Lilesa / 17; (Belete Assefa) / (46)	38
3rd place, bronze medalist(s)	Uganda: Stephen Kiprotich / 6; Moses Ndiema Kipsiro / 11; Geofrey Kusuro / 13; Dickson Huru / 19; (Moses Kibet) / (22)	49
4	Eritrea: Teklemariam Medhin / 14; Adhanom Abraha / 18; Amanuel Mesel / 24; Kiflom Sium / 38; (Mulue Andom) / (44)	94
5	South Africa: Stephen Mokoka / 15; Tshamano Setone / 25; Kgosi Tsosane / 29; Moorosi Soke / 42; (Xolisa Tyali) / (100); (Lungisa Mdedelwa) / (105)	111
6	Bahrain: Ali Hasan Mahboob / 9; Dejene Regassa / 28; Bilisuma Shugi / 30; Edwin Chebii Kimurer / 62; (Alemu Bekele) / (68); (Tareq Mubarak Taher) / (DNF)	129
7	Algeria: Rabah Aboud / 20; Khoudir Aggoune / 34; Ahmed Messeles / 42; Ahmed Naïli / 51; (Mounir Miout) / (84)	147
8	Spain: Ayad Lamdassem / 16; Carles Castillejo / 31; Youssef Aakaou / 32; Arturo Casado / 70; (Ricardo Serrano) / (89); (Antonio David Jiménez) / (DNF)	149
9	United States: Ben True / 35; Max King / 39; Brent Vaughn / 54; Andrew Carlson / 67; (Brian Olinger) / (74); (Andrew Bumbalough) / (77)	195
10	Australia: Craig Mottram / 21; David McNeill / 41; Ben St.Lawrence / 59; Liam Adams / 79; (Clinton Perrett) / (DNF)	200
11	Norway: Sindre Buraas / 26; Sondre Nordstad Moen / 36; Dabaya Badhaso / 55; Lars Erik Malde / 94; (Hans Kristian Fløystad) / (101)	211
12	Portugal: José Rocha / 40; Manuel Damião / 47; Marco Morgado / 65; Licinio Pimentel / 66; (Yousef El Kalai) / (DNF)	218
13	Morocco: Adil Rached / 37; Anis Selmouni / 50; Abdellah Tagharrafet / 64; Abdelhadi El Mouaziz / 75; (Hafid Chani) / (DNF); (Najim El Gady) / (DNF)	226
14	Japan: Hirotaka Tamura / 45; Yusuke Takabayashi / 49; Tsubasa Hayakawa / 83; Tetsuya Yoroizaka / 85	262
15	United Kingdom: Andrew Vernon / 57; Thomas Humphries / 63; Luke Gunn / 72; James Walsh / 76; (Ryan McLeod) / (82); (Derek Hawkins) / (90)	268
16	Canada: Cameron Levins / 56; Kelly Wiebe / 58; Barry Britt / 97; Alex Genest / 98; (Derek Snider) / (104)	309
17	Brazil: Leandro de Oliveira / 73; Israel dos Anjos / 78; Clodoaldo da Silva / 87; Éderson Pereira / 88; (Joilson da Silva) / (DNF)	326

- Note: Athletes in parentheses did not score for the team result.

== Participation ==
According to an unofficial count, 120 athletes from 35 countries participated in the Senior men's race. This is in agreement with the official numbers as published. The announced athletes of Iraq and Nigeria did not show.

- Algeria (5)
- Angola (1)
- Argentina (2)
- Australia (5)
- Bahrain (6)
- Brazil (5)
- Bulgaria (1)
- Canada (5)
- Cayman Islands (1)
- China (2)
- Denmark (1)
- Equatorial Guinea (1)
- Eritrea (6)
- Ethiopia (6)
- France (2)
- Germany (1)
- Italy (2)
- Japan (4)
- Kenya (6)
- Lesotho (1)
- Mexico (1)
- Morocco (6)
- New Zealand (3)
- Norway (5)
- Portugal (6)
- Rwanda (2)
- Seychelles (2)
- South Africa (6)
- Spain (6)
- Switzerland (1)
- Tajikistan (1)
- Tunisia (1)
- Uganda (5)
- United Kingdom (6)
- United States (6)

== See also ==
- 2011 IAAF World Cross Country Championships – Junior men's race
- 2011 IAAF World Cross Country Championships – Senior women's race
- 2011 IAAF World Cross Country Championships – Junior women's race
