= Sindre Buraas =

Norwegian athlete (born 1989)

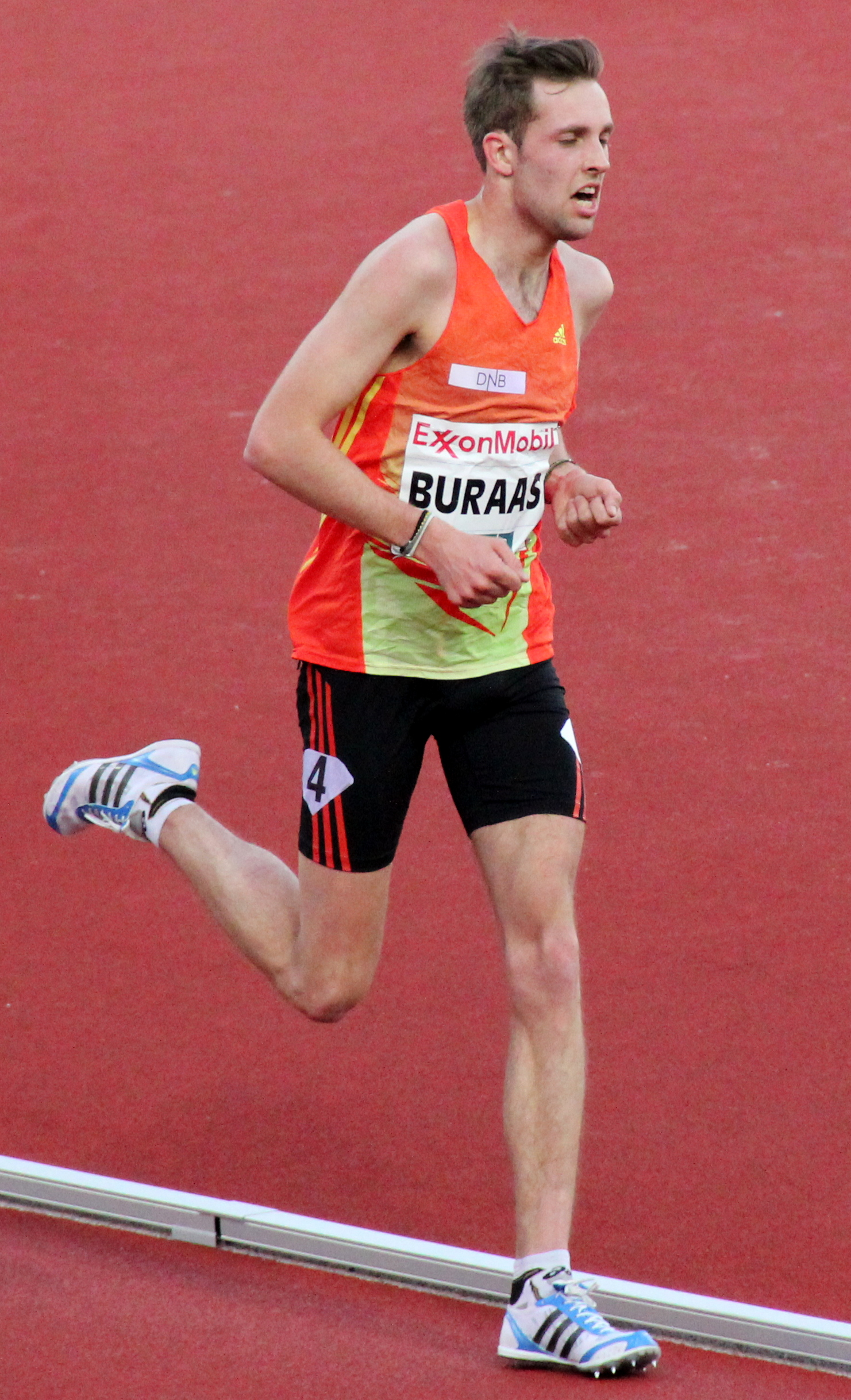
- Sindre Buraas in 2012

Personal information
- Born: 8 May 1989 (age 37)
- Height: 1.83 m (6 ft 0 in)

Sport
- Sport: Track and field
- Event: 5000 metres
- Club: Hurdal IL (–2008); SK Vidar (2009–2015); IF Ready (2016)

Sindre Buraas (born 8 May 1989) is a retired Norwegian long-distance runner competing primarily in the 5000 metres. He represented his country at the 2013 and 2015 World Championships in Athletics reaching the final on the first occasion. In addition, he won the gold medal at the 2011 European U23 Championships.

== International competitions ==
Year	Competition	Venue	Position	Event	Notes
Representing Norway
2007	European Junior Championships	Hengelo, Netherlands	12th	5000 m	14:59.35
2009	European U23 Championships	Kaunas, Lithuania	17th	5000 m	14:25.83
2010	World Mountain Running Championships	Kamnik, Slovenia	18th	Senior race	61:21
2010	European Championships	Barcelona, Spain	23rd (h)	5000 m	14:03.93
2011	World Cross Country Championships	Punta Umbría, Spain	26th	Senior race	35:38
2011	European U23 Championships	Ostrava, Czech Republic	1st	5000 m	14:22.69
2012	European Championships	Helsinki, Finland	18th	5000 m	13:51.64
2013	World Championships	Moscow, Russia	13th	5000 m	13:45.67
2015	World Championships	Beijing, China	30th (h)	5000 m	13:59.07
2016	European Championships	Amsterdam, Netherlands	18th	5000 m	14:26.05

== Personal bests ==
Outdoor

- 1500 metres – 3:42.20 (Oslo 2011)
- 3000 metres – 7:50.72 (Rieti 2015)
- 3000 metres steeplechase – 9:13.26 (Florø 2008)
- 5000 metres – 13:11.96 (Heusden-Zolder 2015)
- 10,000 metres – 28:56.46 (Oslo 2010)
- Half marathon – 1:05:49 hours (Oslo 2013)
