= Bonsa Dida =

Ethiopian long-distance runner

Bonsa Deriba Dida (born 21 January 1995) is an Ethiopian male long-distance runner who competes in track, road and cross country running. He has represented Ethiopia three times at the IAAF World Cross Country Championships and at the 2014 IAAF World Half Marathon Championships.

He made his debut over the marathon in May 2014, recording 2:12:33 at the Hamburg Marathon. He returned to the distance in January 2017 and came fifth at the Mumbai Marathon with a time of 2:11:55.

== Personal bests ==
- 3000 metres – 8:04.64 min (2014)
- 5000 metres – 13:41.44 min (2011)
- 10,000 metres – 28:13.84 min (2016)
- 10K run – 27:53 min (2015)
- Half Marathon – 60:19 min (2015)
- Marathon – 2:11:55 (2017)

All information from All-Athletics

== International competitions ==
Year	Competition	Venue	Position	Event	Notes
2011	World Cross Country Championships	Punta Umbría, Spain	4th	Junior race	22:39
2011	World Cross Country Championships	Punta Umbría, Spain	2nd	Junior team	24 pts
2011	African Junior Championships	Gaborone, Botswana	5th	10,000 m	28:58.68
2013	World Cross Country Championships	Bydgoszcz, Poland	17th	Junior race	22:38
2014	World Half Marathon Championships	Copenhagen, Denmark	14th	Half marathon	1:01:12
2014	World Half Marathon Championships	Copenhagen, Denmark	3rd	Team	3:00:48
2015	IAAF World Cross Country Championships	Guiyang, China	14th	Senior race	36:17
