= Mutanga =

Mutanga is a surname. Notable people with the surname include:

- Gédéon Kyungu Mutanga, Congolese militia leader
- Tinashe Mutanga (born 1993), Zimbabwean sprinter
