= Samsom Gebreyohannes =

Eritrean long-distance runner

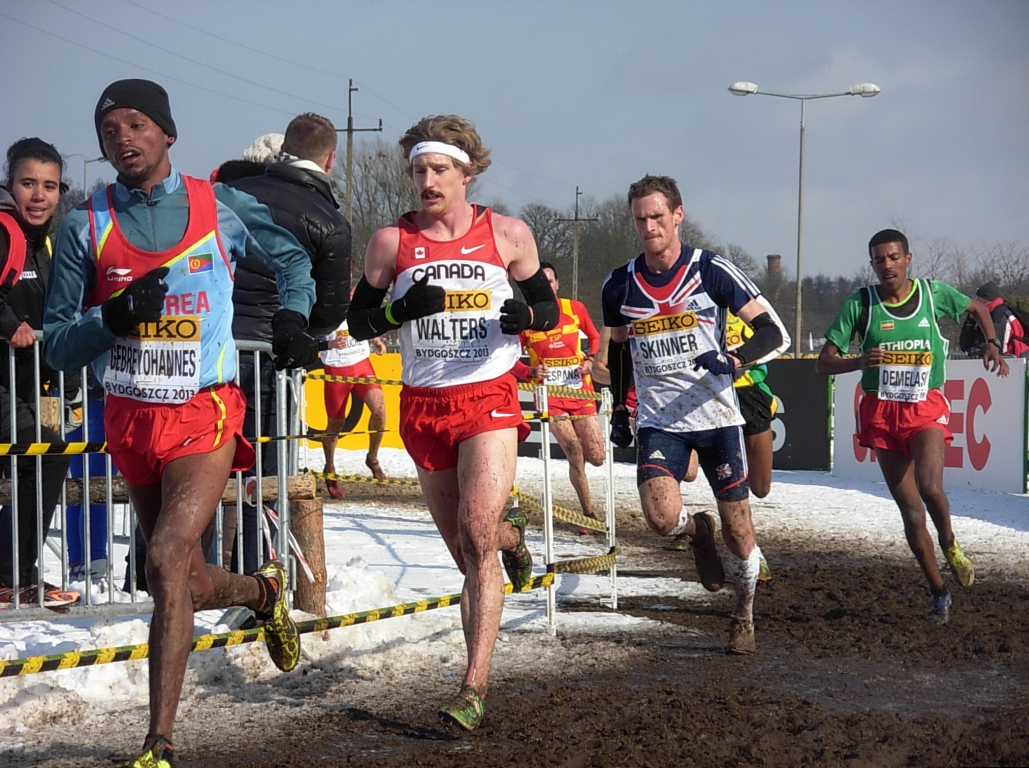
Samsom Gebreyohannes (left) at the 2013 IAAF World Cross Country Championships

Samsom Gebreyohannes (born 7 February 1992) is an Eritrean long-distance runner who competes in cross country and half marathon races.

== Competition record ==
| Year | Competition | Venue | Position | Event | Notes |
Representing Eritrea
| 2010 | World Cross Country Championships | Bydgoszcz, Poland | 23rd | Junior race | 23:24 |
| 2011 | World Cross Country Championships | Punta Umbría, Spain | 12th | Junior race | 23:18 |
| 2013 | World Cross Country Championships | Bydgoszcz, Poland | 47th | Senior race | 34:43 |
| 2014 | World Half Marathon Championships | Copenhagen, Denmark | 8th | Senior race | 1:00:13 |
| 2015 | African Games | Brazzaville, Congo | 4th | Half marathon | 1:04:14 |
| 2016 | World Half Marathon Championships | Cardiff, UK | 24th | Senior race | 1:04:03 |
| 2017 | World Cross Country Championships | Kampala, Uganda | 32nd | Senior race | 30:11 |

== Personal bests ==
- 3000 metres – 8:04.77 (2011)
- 5000 metres – 13:32.97 (2010)
- 10,000 metres – 28:28.05 (2012)
- 10 kilometres – 28:12 (2015)
- 20 kilometres – 57:08 (2014)
- Half marathon – 1:00:13 (2014)
- Marathon – 2:14:25 (2017)
