= Vivian Cheruiyot =

Kenyan long-distance runner

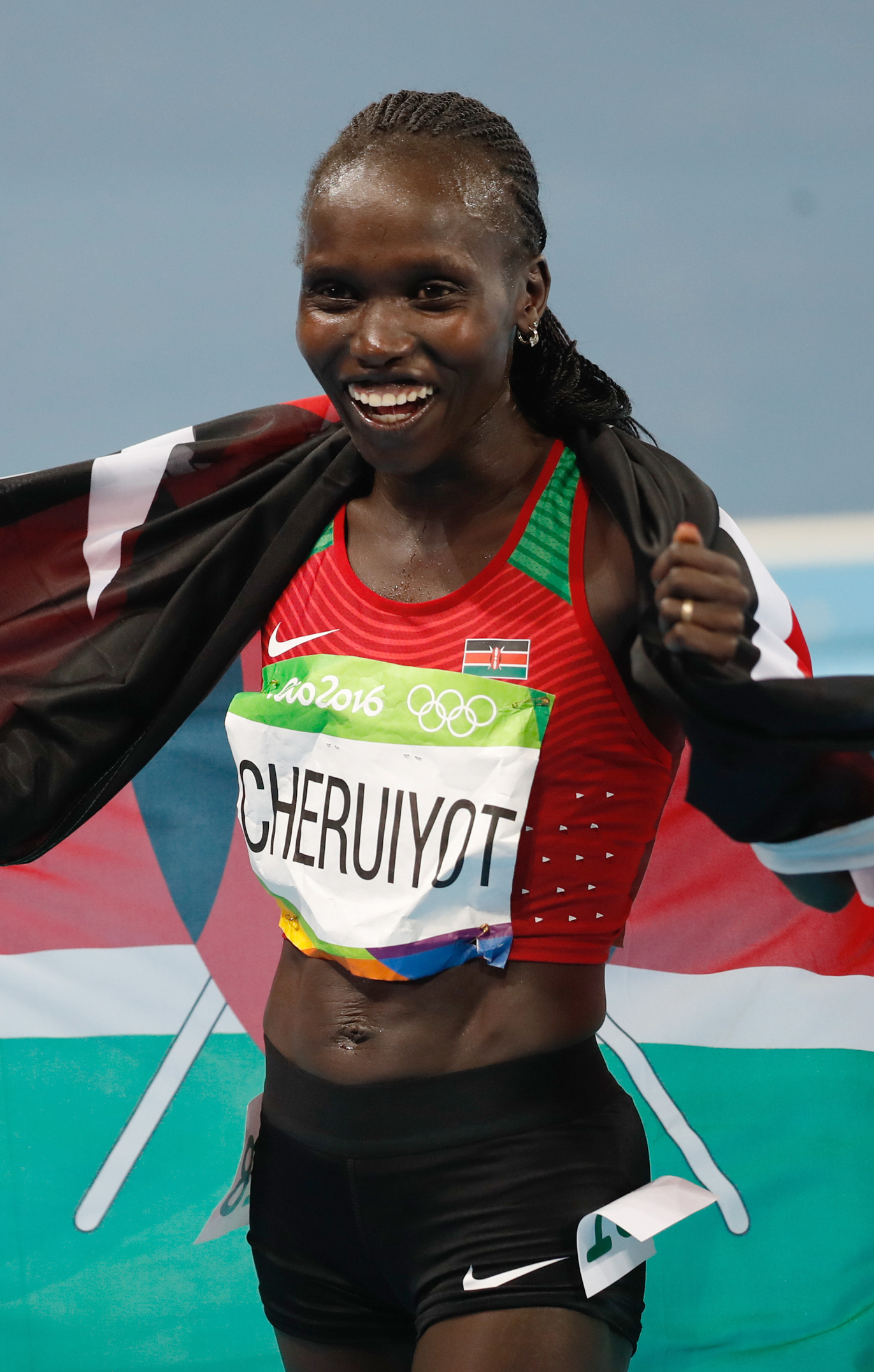
- Cheruiyot at the 2016 Rio Olympics

Personal information
- Full name: Vivian Jepkemoi Cheruiyot
- Nickname: Pocket Rocket
- Born: 11 September 1983 (age 43) Keiyo, Rift Valley, Kenya
- Height: 1.59 m (5 ft 3 in)
- Weight: 40 kg (88 lb)

Sport
- Country: Kenya
- Sport: Athletics
- Event: Long-distance running

Achievements and titles
- Olympic finals: 2000 Sydney; 5000 m, 14th; 2008 Beijing; 5000 m, 4th; 2012 London; 5000 m, Silver; 10,000 m, Bronze; 2016 Rio; 5000 m, Gold; 10,000 m, Silver
- World finals: 2007 Osaka; 5000 m, Silver; 2009 Berlin; 5000 m, Gold; 2011 Daegu; 5000 m, Gold; 10,000 m, Gold; 2015 Beijing; 10,000 m, Gold
- Personal bests: 5000 m: 14:20.87 (Stockholm 2011); 10,000 m: 29:32.53 NR (Rio de Janeiro 2016); Marathon: 2:18:31 (London 2018)
Medal record
Women's athletics
Representing Kenya
Olympic Games
Gold medal – first place	2016 Rio de Janeiro	5000 m
Silver medal – second place	2012 London	5000 m
Silver medal – second place	2016 Rio de Janeiro	10,000 m
Bronze medal – third place	2012 London	10,000 m
World Championships
Gold medal – first place	2009 Berlin	5000 m
Gold medal – first place	2011 Daegu	5000 m
Gold medal – first place	2011 Daegu	10,000 m
Gold medal – first place	2015 Beijing	10,000 m
Silver medal – second place	2007 Osaka	5000 m
World Indoor Championships
Silver medal – second place	2010 Doha	3000 m
Diamond League
First place	2010	5000 m
First place	2011	5000 m
First place	2012	5000 m
Commonwealth Games
Gold medal – first place	2010 Delhi	5000 m
All-Africa Games
Bronze medal – third place	1999 Johannesburg	5000 m
African Championships
Gold medal – first place	2010 Nairobi	5000 m
World Junior Championships
Bronze medal – third place	2002 Kingston	5000 m
African Junior Championships
Gold medal – first place	2001 Réduit	5000 m
World Youth Championships
Bronze medal – third place	1999 Bydgoszcz	3000 m
World Marathon Majors
Gold medal – first place	2018 London	Marathon
Silver medal – second place	2018 New York	Marathon
Silver medal – second place	2019 London	Marathon
Bronze medal – third place	2024 New York	Marathon
World Cross Country Championships
Gold medal – first place	2000 Vilamoura	Junior race
Gold medal – first place	2011 Punta Umbría	Senior race
Gold medal – first place	2011 Punta Umbría	Senior team
Silver medal – second place	1999 Belfast	Junior race
Silver medal – second place	2007 Mombasa	Senior team
Bronze medal – third place	2002 Dublin	Junior race

Vivian Jepkemoi Cheruiyot (born 11 September 1983) is a Kenyan long-distance runner. She represented Kenya at the Summer Olympics in 2000, 2008, 2012, and 2016, winning the silver medal in the 5,000 metres and bronze in the 10,000 metres at the 2012 London Olympics as well as gold in the 5,000 m and silver in the 10,000 m at the 2016 Rio Olympics, setting a new Olympic record in the former. Cheruiyot won the silver medal in the 5,000 m at the 2007 World Championships in Athletics and became the world champion in the event at the 2009 edition, repeating this achievement in 2011, when she also won the 10,000 m. She added gold for the latter event at the 2015 World Championships in Athletics. After taking a silver in the 3,000 metres at the 2010 World Indoor Championships, Cheruiyot won a number of outdoor 5,000 m titles that year, becoming Commonwealth Games, African and Continental Cup champion, as well as winning the Diamond League title.

She is a three-time Diamond League champion, having also won the 2011 and 2012 editions. She is the Kenyan record holder for the 2,000 m and 10,000 m. In 2012, Cheruiyot was voted Laureus World Sportswoman of the Year. She is nicknamed "pocket rocket".

== Career ==
Vivian Cheruiyot is trained by Ricky Simms. She was born near Keiyo in the Rift Valley Province, coming from the same village as another female runner Alice Timbilili.

Her breakthrough year came in 1999: at the age of fifteen she took the junior silver medal at the 1999 IAAF World Cross Country Championships behind Werknesh Kidane. At the 1999 World Youth Championships in Athletics she won the bronze medal in the 3000 metres. Cheruiyot earned a senior call-up for the 1999 All-Africa Games, where she managed a bronze medal in the 5000 metres. She became the junior champion at the 2000 IAAF World Cross Country Championships. Cheruiyot gained selection for the 2000 Olympic Games and reached the 5000 m final after setting personal bests in the qualifying rounds. She was much slower in the final and was the last runner to finish.

Cheruiyot won the silver medal at the 5000 m final of the 2007 World Championships in Osaka, Japan with a time of 14:58.50, behind Meseret Defar in 14:57.91.

In early 2009 she broke the Kenyan indoor 3000 m record with a time of 8:30.53 in Birmingham, and won the World's Best 10K race in Puerto Rico. In May, she won the Great Manchester Run 10K race. Cheruiyot won the women's 5000 m at the 2009 World Championships in Berlin with a time of 14 minutes 58.33 seconds, while countrywoman Sylvia Kibet took the silver. She closed the track season with a 3000 m silver and a 5000 m bronze at the 2009 IAAF World Athletics Final. She won the 2009 New Year's Eve San Silvestre Vallecana race.

Cheruiyot retained her World's Best 10K title in 2010. An appearance at the 2010 IAAF World Indoor Championships resulted in a silver medal in the 3000 m behind Meseret Defar. Cheruiyot then headed the Kenyan 5000 m challenge at the African Championships in Athletics in Nairobi and beat Defar on this occasion to take the African title. After this, her main focus of the year was the Diamond League. She took victories in the 5000 m at the Meeting Areva and Memorial van Damme and was elected the inaugural Diamond League Trophy winner for the event on overall points. She defeated Sentayehu Ejigu at the Continental Cup to take the 5000 m gold medal for Africa. Another gold medal in the event came at the Commonwealth Games held that year in Delhi, where she headed a Kenyan podium sweep with Sylvia Kibet and Ines Chenonge. Cheruiyot returned to Kenya to train and took an 8 km win at the Tuskys Cross Country meeting. She ended the year on a high note with a win at the BOclassic 5K race on New Year's Eve.

Cheruiyot began preparing for the World Cross Country Championships in January 2011 and came third at the Great Edinburgh Cross Country before overhauling Linet Masai to win the Cross de Itálica in Seville. A second-place finish at the Kenyan Cross Country Championships guaranteed her a place in the Kenyan squad and, in contrast to her successes on the track, she was looking to win her first cross country medal on the world stage. Her rival Masai led the initial charge at the World Cross Country Championships, but Cheruiyot broke away on the final lap to secure the gold medal and lead Kenya to the women's team title.

She started 2012 with a win at the World's Best 10K and improved her best on the roads to 30:47 minutes. She opened the Diamond League circuit with narrow wins ahead of Meseret Defar, first in the 3000 m in Doha and then over 5000 m in Rome. Cheruiyot guaranteed her place at the Olympics by winning the 10,000 m trial in Nairobi in June. At the Olympics, she won the silver medal in the 5000 metres and a bronze at the 10,000 metres.

In 2018, she won the 2018 London Marathon with a time of 2:18:31.

She took second place in the 2018 New York City Marathon, finishing in 2:26:02 far behind winner Mary Keitany in 2:22:48, and 20 seconds ahead of Shalane Flanagan who ran 2:26:22.

== Achievements ==
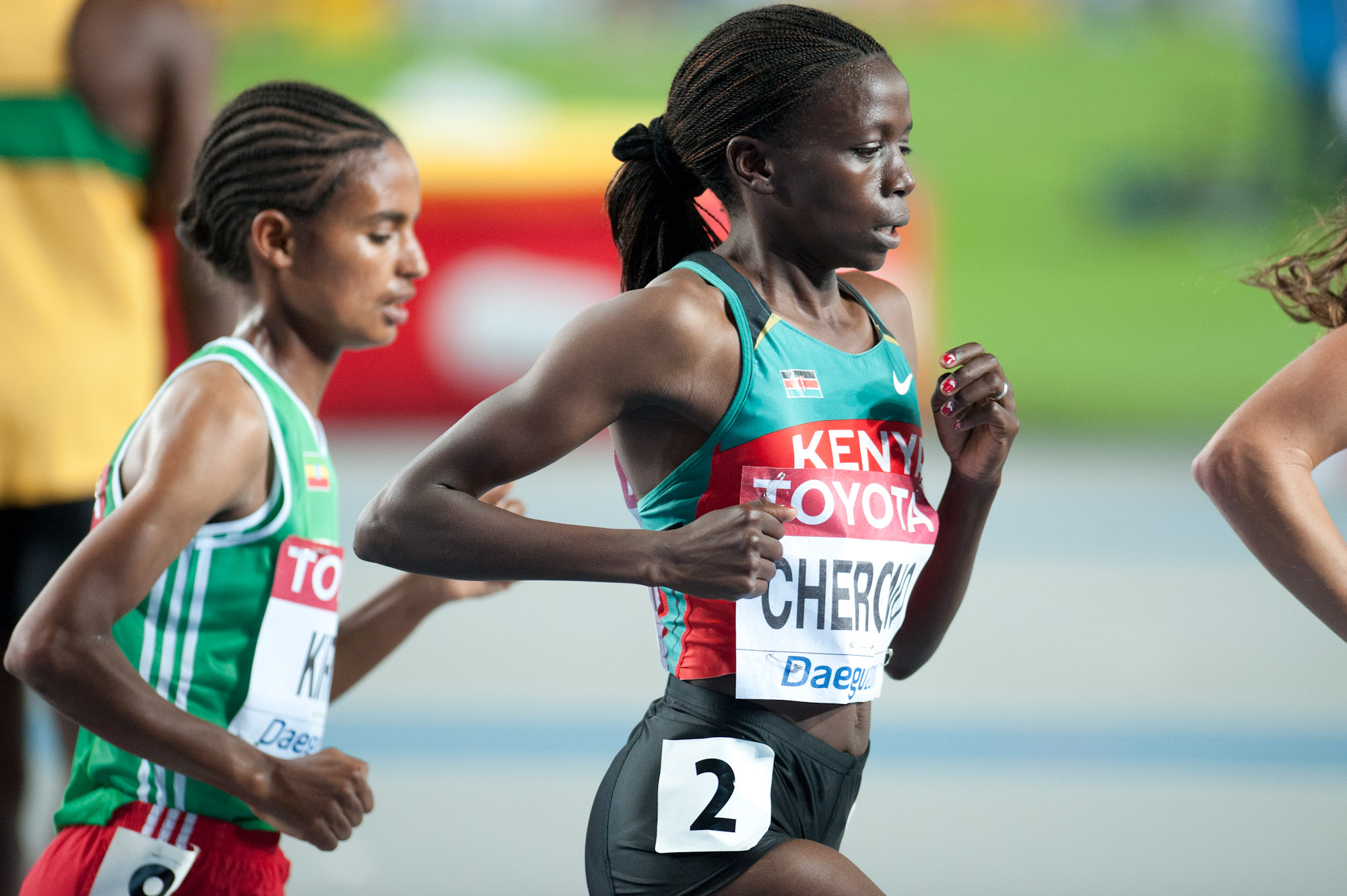
Vivian Cheruiyot races the 10,000 m at the 2011 World Championships in Athletics held in Daegu, South Korea.

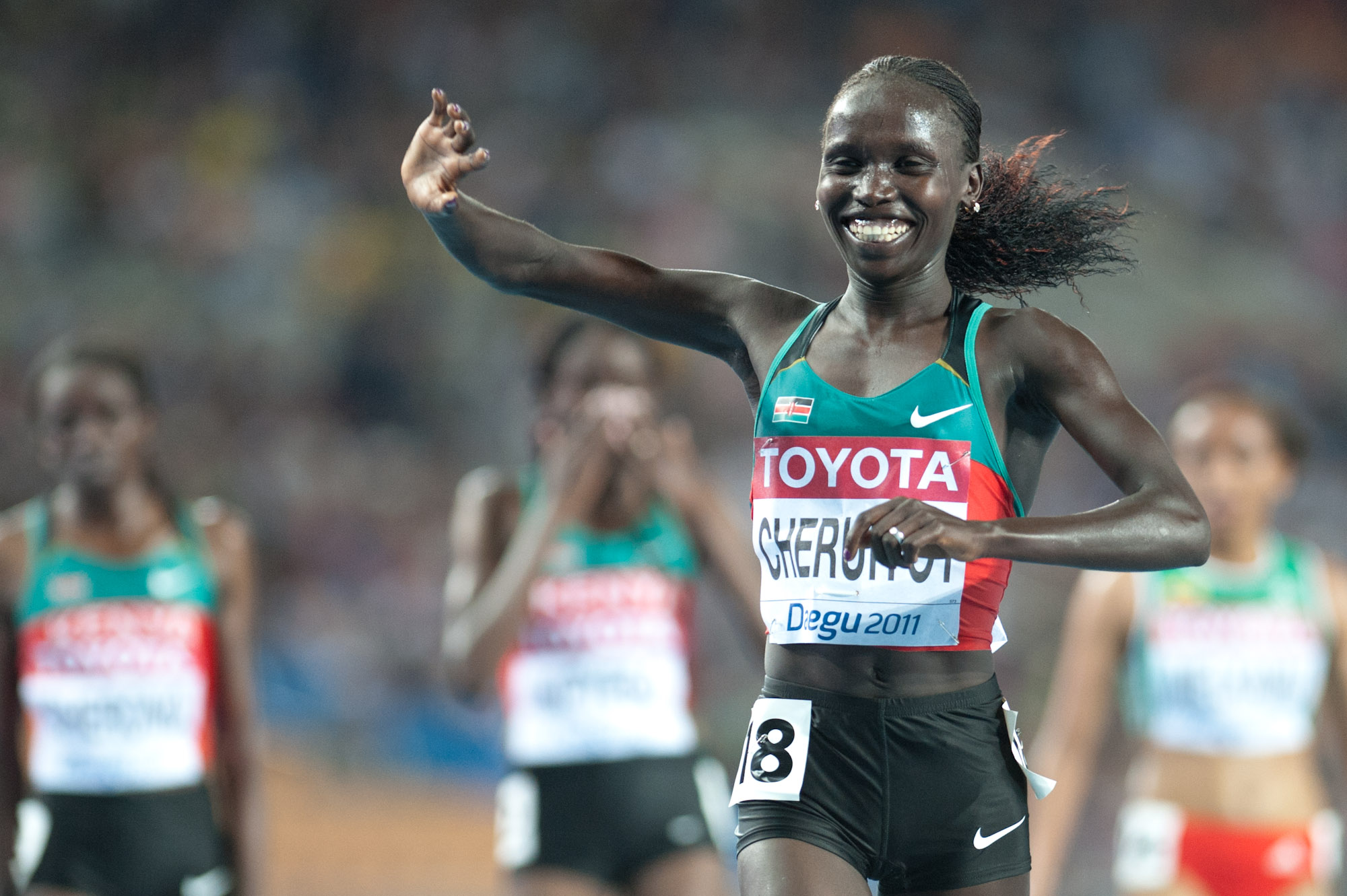
Cheruiyot celebrates her 10,000 m victory at Daegu 2011. She won also the 5000 m final six days later.

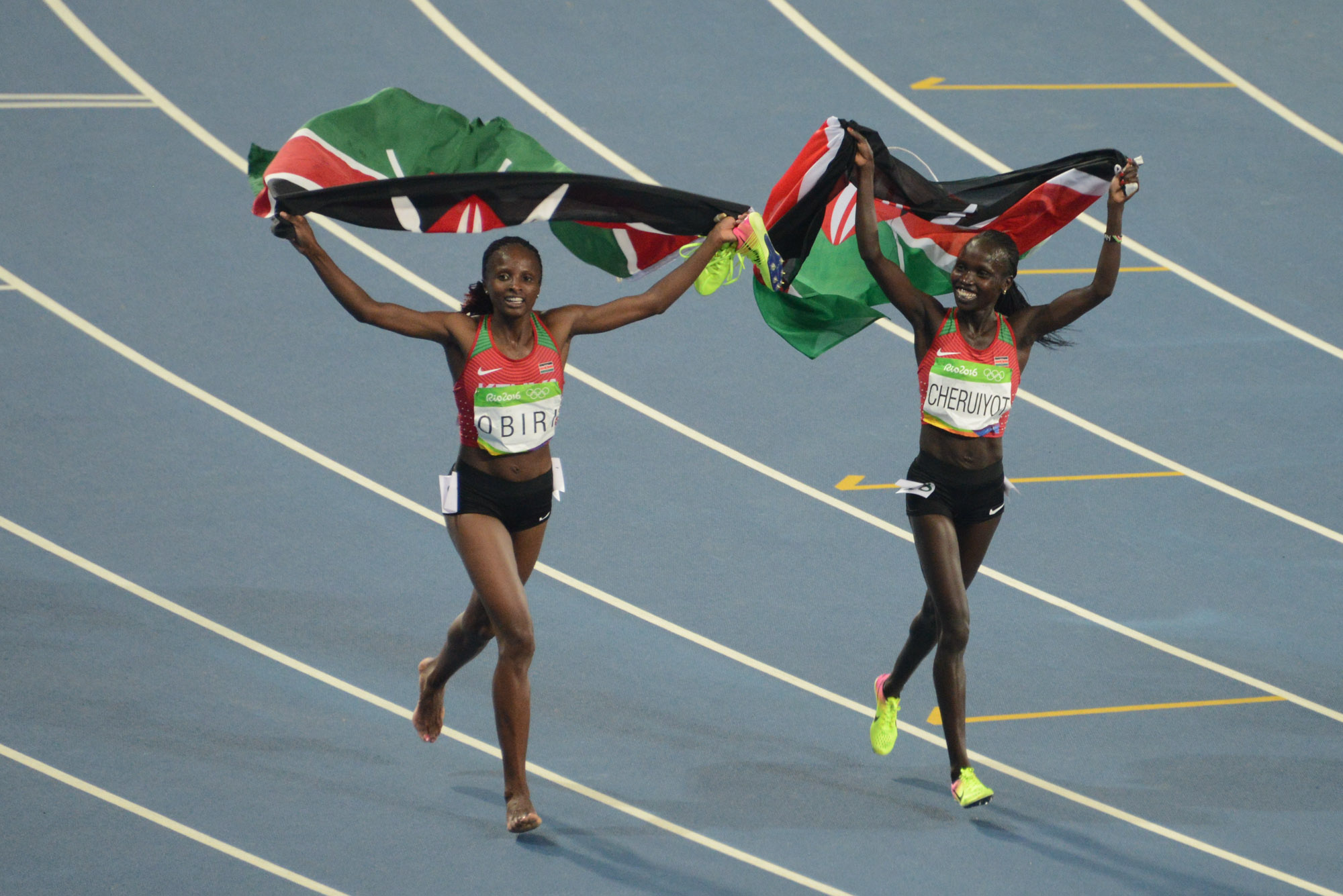
Vivian Cheruiyot (R) and Hellen Obiri (L), 1–2 in the 5000 m, celebrate their success at the 2016 Rio Olympics.

All information taken from World Athletics profile.

=== Personal bests ===
Type	Event	Time (m:s)	Venue	Date	Notes
Track	1500 metres	4:06.6h	Nairobi, Kenya	18 May 2012	
Track	2000 metres	5:31.52	Eugene, United States	7 June 2009	NR
Track	3000 metres	8:28.66	Stuttgart, Germany	23 September 2007	
Track	3000 metres indoor	8:30.53	Birmingham, United Kingdom	21 February 2009	
Track	Two miles indoor	9:12.35	Birmingham, United Kingdom	20 February 2010	
Track	5000 metres	14:20.87	Stockholm, Sweden	29 July 2011	
Track	10,000 metres	29:32.53	Rio de Janeiro, Brazil	12 August 2016	NR
Road	5 kilometres	15:11	London, United Kingdom	6 September 2009	
Road	10 kilometres	30:47	San Juan, Puerto Rico	26 February 2012	
Road	10 miles	51:17	Portsmouth, United Kingdom	25 October 2015	
Road	Half marathon	1:06:34	Lisbon, Portugal	17 March 2019	
Road	Marathon	2:18:31	London, United Kingdom	22 April 2018	

=== International competitions ===
Representing Kenya
Year	Competition	Venue	Position	Event	Time
1998	World Cross Country Championships	Marrakesh, Morocco	5th	Junior race (6 km)	19:47
1999	World Cross Country Championships	Belfast, United Kingdom	2nd	Junior race (6.124 km)	21:37
1999	All-Africa Games	Johannesburg, South Africa	3rd	5000 m	15:42.79
1999	World Youth Championships	Bydgoszcz, Poland	3rd	3000 m	9:04.42
2000	World Cross Country Championships	Vilamoura, Portugal	1st	Junior race (6.29 km)	20:34
2001	World Cross Country Championships	Ostend, Belgium	4th	Junior race (5.9 km)	20:22
2001	African Junior Championships	Réduit, Mauritius	1st	5000 m	16:19.54
2002	World Cross Country Championships	Dublin, Ireland	3rd	Junior race (5.962 km)	20:22
2002	World Junior Championships	Kingston, Jamaica	3rd	5000 m	15:56.04
2004	World Cross Country Championships	Brussels, Belgium	8th	Short race (4 km)	13:23
2006	World Cross Country Championships	Fukuoka, Japan	8th	Short race (4 km)	13:10
2006	World Athletics Final	Stuttgart, Germany	3rd	3000 m	8:38.86
2006	World Athletics Final	Stuttgart, Germany	5th	5000 m	16:07.95
2007	World Cross Country Championships	Mombasa, Kenya	8th	Long race (8 km)	28:10
2007	World Championships	Osaka, Japan	2nd	5000 m	14:58.50
2007	World Athletics Final	Stuttgart, Germany	2nd	3000 m	8:28.66 PB
2007	World Athletics Final	Stuttgart, Germany	1st	5000 m	14:56.94
2008	Olympic Games	Beijing, China	4th	5000 m	15:46.32
2008	World Athletics Final	Stuttgart, Germany	2nd	3000 m	8:44.64
2008	World Athletics Final	Stuttgart, Germany	2nd	5000 m	14:54.60
2009	World Championships	Berlin, Germany	1st	5000 m	14:57.97
2009	World Athletics Final	Thessaloniki, Greece	2nd	3000 m	8:30.61
2009	World Athletics Final	Thessaloniki, Greece	3rd	5000 m	15:26.21
2010	World Indoor Championships	Doha, Qatar	2nd	3000 m	8:51.85
2010	African Championships	Nairobi, Kenya	1st	5000 m	16:18.73
2010	Continental Cup	Split, Croatia	1st	5000 m	16:05.74
2010	Commonwealth Games	New Delhi, India	1st	5000 m	15:55.12
2011	World Cross Country Championships	Punta Umbría, Spain	1st	Senior race (8 km)	24:58
2011	World Championships	Daegu, South Korea	1st	5000 m	14:55.36
2011	World Championships	Daegu, South Korea	1st	10,000 m	30:48.98
2012	Olympic Games	London, United Kingdom	2nd	5000 m	15:04.73
2012	Olympic Games	London, United Kingdom	3rd	10,000 m	30:30.44
2015	World Championships	Beijing, China	1st	10,000 m	31:41.31
2016	Olympic Games	Rio de Janeiro, Brazil	1st	5000 m	14:26.17 OR
2016	Olympic Games	Rio de Janeiro, Brazil	2nd	10,000 m	29:32.53 NR

=== Marathon competition record ===
Year	Competition	Venue	Position	Time	Notes
2003	Vitoria Marathon	Vitoria-Gasteiz, Spain	1st	2:41:09	13 April
2017	London Marathon	London, United Kingdom	4th	2:23:50	23 April
2017	Frankfurt Marathon	Frankfurt, Germany	1st	2:23:35	29 October
2018	London Marathon	London, United Kingdom	1st	2:18:31	22 April
2018	New York Marathon	New York, United States	2nd	2:26:02	4 November
2019	London Marathon	London, United Kingdom	2nd	2:20:14	28 April
2019	Valencia Marathon	Valencia, Spain	4th	2:18:52	1 December

=== Circuit wins and titles ===
- Golden League
  - 2007: Berlin ISTAF
  - 2008: Brussels Memorial Van Damme
- Diamond League Overall 5000 metres winner: 2010, 2011, 2012

5000 metres wins, other events specified in parentheses

- 2010 (3): Lausanne Athletissima (3000 m, WL MR), Paris Meeting Areva) (WL MR), Brussels Memorial Van Damme
- 2011 (4): Shanghai Golden Grand Prix (WL), Eugene Prefontaine Classic (MR), Stockholm DN Galan (WL NR), Zürich Weltklasse (MR)
- 2012 (4): Doha Qatar Athletic Super Grand Prix (3000 m, WL), Rome Golden Gala (WL), London Grand Prix, Brussels
- 2016 (1): Birmingham British Grand Prix

=== National titles ===
- Kenyan Athletics Championships
  - 1500 metres: 2009, 2015
  - 5000 metres: 1999, 2010
  - 10,000 metres: 2011, 2012

== Recognition ==
- 2012 Laureus World Sportswoman of the Year

Awards
Preceded by Blanka Vlašić	Women's Track & Field Athlete of the Year; 2011	Succeeded by Valerie Adams
Preceded by Lindsey Vonn	Laureus World Sportswoman of the Year; 2011	Succeeded by Jessica Ennis
Sporting positions
Preceded by Meseret Defar	Women's 3000 m Best Year Performance; 2008	Succeeded by Meseret Defar
Preceded by Tirunesh Dibaba and Meseret Defar	Women's 5000 m Best Year Performance; 2010–2012 (shared with Meseret Defar)	Succeeded by Tirunesh Dibaba
