= Buze Diriba =

Ethiopian long-distance runner

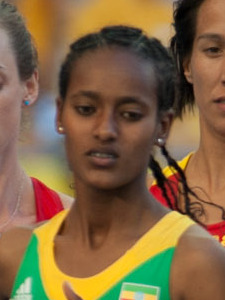
Buze Diriba 2013 World Championships in Athletics

Buze Diriba Kejela (born 9 February 1994) is an Ethiopian female long-distance runner who competes in track, road and cross country running disciplines. She represented her country in the 5000 metres at the 2013 World Championships in Athletics, taking fifth. She was the World Junior Champion in 2012.

She ran in the junior race twice at the IAAF World Cross Country Championships. She was tenth in 2011, a non-scoring member of Ethiopia's gold medal-winning team, and improved to ninth at the 2013 race, helping Ethiopia to the team silver medals. She was also a junior team race winner at the 2012 African Cross Country Championships, finishing sixth in the race.

She made her debut on the 2012 IAAF Diamond League circuit and placed third in the 3000 metres at the Herculis meeting. She closed the year with a win at the Giro Podistico di Pettinengo. The year after, she was in the top six at the 2013 IAAF Diamond League races in Shanghai, Eugene, Oslo and Paris.

She failed to improve in the 2014 track season and turning to road running in instead. In 2015, she ran in the United States and won the Shamrockin' Run and the Parkersburg Half Marathon, as well as taking top three finishes at the Freihofer's Run For Women and Carrera De La Mujer. The following year she topped the field at the Crescent City Classic and was runner-up at the Cherry Blossom Ten Mile Run, BAA 5K and Peachtree Road Race. Buze Diribe won 2016 AACR Rock 'n' Roll Philadelphia Half Marathon in 1:11:49 ahead of Neely Spence Gracey.

In 2026 Diriba won the Amsterdam Marathon in wet conditions. She ran a new personal record of 2:16:12.

== Personal bests ==
- 1500 metres – 4:10.96 min (2012)
- 3000 metres – 8:39.65 min (2012)
- Two miles – 9:40.01 min (2014)
- Two miles indoor – 9:29.03 min (2015)
- 5000 metres – 14:50.02 min (2013)
- 10,000 metres – 31:33.27 min (2015)
- 10K run – 31:57 min (2016)
- Half marathon – 72:56 min (2015)
- Marathon – 2:16:12 (2026)

All information from All Athletics

== International competitions ==
Year	Competition	Venue	Position	Event	Notes
2011	World Cross Country Championships	Punta Umbría, Spain	10th	Junior race	19:34
2011	World Cross Country Championships	Punta Umbría, Spain	1st	Junior team	17 pts
2012	African Cross Country Championships	Cape Town, South Africa	6th	Junior race	20:07
2012	African Cross Country Championships	Cape Town, South Africa	1st	Junior team	1:20:12
2012	World Junior Championships	Barcelona, Spain	1st	5000 m	15:32.94
2013	World Cross Country Championships	Bydgoszcz, Poland	9th	Junior race	18:29
2013	World Cross Country Championships	Bydgoszcz, Poland	2nd	Junior team	23 pts
2013	World Championships	Moscow, Russia	5th	5000 m	15:05.38
