= 2011 IAAF World Cross Country Championships =

Coordinates: 37°11′41″N 6°58′16″W

39th World Cross Country Championships
- Organisers: IAAF
- Edition: 39th
- Date: 20 March
- Host city: Punta Umbría, Andalucía, Spain
- Venue: Polideportivo Antonio Gil Hernández
- Events: 4
- Distances: 12 km – Senior men 8 km – Senior women 8 km – Junior men 6 km – Junior women
- Participation: 423 athletes from 51 nations
- Official website: Punta Umbria 2011

The 2011 IAAF World Cross Country Championships took place on March 20, 2011. The races were held at the Polideportivo Antonio Gil Hernández in Punta Umbría, Spain. Reports of the event were given for the IAAF.

== Preparation ==
The United States had expressed an interest in hosting the competition, but Punta Umbria was chosen as the host at the IAAF Council Meeting in November 2009. It will be the third occasion that Spain has hosted the competition, coming thirty years after Madrid held the 1981 edition.

The course for the competition, set in a wooded area, has a 2 km loop format with an additional 600 m section for the start and finish of each race. A number of top runners were invited to preview the course in early 2011 and all confirmed that they were pleased with its quality. Defending champion Joseph Ebuya said he liked the course but suggested that organisers add additional barriers along the route, claiming its flat features would make it difficult for runners to devise a race strategy.

Multiple world champion Kenenisa Bekele will not compete for a third year running, owing to his failure to return to fitness following a season-long calf injury.

=== Qualification ===
Athletes can gain qualification into the World Championships through performances at either their national trials or through the following IAAF Permit Meetings:

- Cross de Atapuerca
- Oeiras International Cross Country
- Lotto Cross Cup Brussels
- Great Edinburgh International Cross Country
- Cross Internacional de Itálica
- Antrim International Cross Country
- Cinque Mulini
- KCB Nairobi Cross
- Chiba International Cross Country
- Fukuoka International Cross Country
- Eurocross
- Almond Blossom Cross Country

=== Pre-race form ===
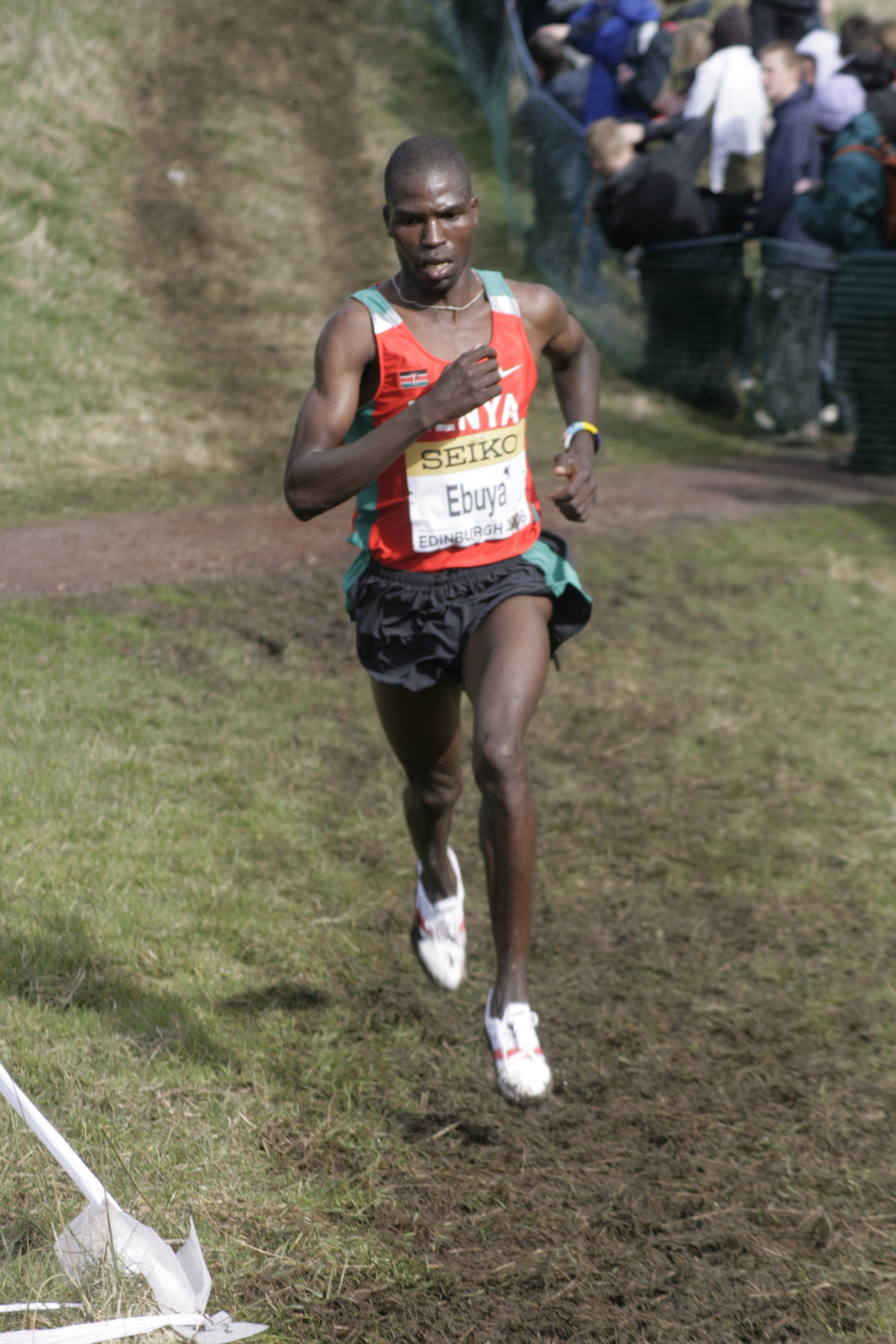
The 2010 champion Joseph Ebuya was not selected to defend his men's crown.

The results of the Kenyan Cross Country Championships ruled out the defending men's and women's champions (Joseph Ebuya and Emily Chebet) before the World Championships had begun: despite his strong form on the circuit that season, Ebuya dropped out of his national race, while an ankle injury prevented Chebet from gaining selection.

Unlike previous years, no former champion was present in the line-up for the men's senior event at the World Championships. This left three East African national champions as some of the foremost contenders – Kenya's Geoffrey Mutai, Hunegnaw Mesfin of Ethiopia and Ugandan runner Moses Kipsiro. Teklemariam Medhin, a young Eritrean and runner-up in 2010, had also demonstrated strong form with wins on the Spanish cross country circuit. The men's team race was also anticipated to be a battle between these four East Africa nations.

Past champions were similarly absent from the women's senior race. Linet Masai was one of principal protagonists once more, having been pipped into second place by a fellow Kenyan at both the 2009 and 2010 editions. One of her strongest rivals was yet again one of her countrywomen, this time in the form of track specialist Vivian Cheruiyot. Four-time long race bronze medallist Meselech Melkamu led the Ethiopian team, which included Genzebe Dibaba (sister of past winner Tirunesh) among its representatives. Aside from two others in the Kenyan team (Lineth Chepkurui and Pauline Korikwiang), American Shalane Flanagan and Bahrain's Maryam Yusuf Jamal were the remaining prominent names expected to challenge for the medals.

In the junior races, the foremost runner was Isaiah Koech, who had set world junior indoor bests on the track in the months preceding the competition. A victory at the Kenyan junior race established him as a contender for the cross country title. Although the Kenyan junior women team did not have a star name, it was favoured to defend its team title against the Ethiopian challengers in an event at which the country is traditionally strong.

== Schedule ==
Date	Time	Events
20 March	11:30	Junior race women
20 March	12:00	Junior race men
20 March	12:45	Senior race women
20 March	13:40	Senior race men

== Results ==
=== Senior men's race (12 km) ===
Complete results for senior men, for senior men's teams, were published.

Individual race
Rank	Athlete	Country	Time (m:s)
Gold medal	Imane Merga	Ethiopia	33:50
Silver medal	Paul Kipngetich Tanui	Kenya	33:52
Bronze medal	Vincent Kiprop Chepkok	Kenya	33:53
4	Mathew Kipkoech Kisorio	Kenya	33:55
5	Geoffrey Mutai	Kenya	34:03
6	Stephen Kiprotich	Uganda	34:07
7	Philemon Kimeli Limo	Kenya	34:21
8	Hunegnaw Mesfin	Ethiopia	34:25
9	Ali Hasan Mahboob	Bahrain	34:30
10	Hosea Mwok Macharinyang	Kenya	34:30
11	Moses Ndiema Kipsiro	Uganda	34:31
12	Dino Sefir	Ethiopia	34:35
Full results

Teams
Rank	Team	Points
Gold medal	Kenya: Paul Kipngetich Tanui / 2; Vincent Kiprop Chepkok / 3; Mathew Kipkoech Kisorio / 4; Geoffrey Kiprono Mutai / 5; (Philemon Kimeli Limo) / (7); (Hosea Mwok Macharinyang) / (10)	14
Silver medal	Ethiopia: Imane Merga / 1; Hunegnaw Mesfin / 8; Dino Sefir / 12; Feyisa Lilesa / 17; (Belete Assefa) / (46)	38
Bronze medal	Uganda: Stephen Kiprotich / 6; Moses Ndiema Kipsiro / 11; Geofrey Kusuro / 13; Dickson Huru / 19; (Moses Kibet) / (22)	49
4	Eritrea	94
5	South Africa	111
6	Bahrain	129
7	Algeria	150
8	Spain	150
Full results

- Note: Athletes in parentheses did not score for the team result.

=== Senior women's race (8 km) ===
Complete results for senior women, and for senior women's teams were published.

Individual race
Rank	Athlete	Country	Time (m:s)
Gold medal	Vivian Cheruiyot	Kenya	24:58
Silver medal	Linet Masai	Kenya	25:07
Bronze medal	Shalane Flanagan	United States	25:10
4	Meselech Melkamu	Ethiopia	25:18
5	Priscah Jepleting Cherono	Kenya	25:20
6	Wude Ayalew	Ethiopia	25:21
7	Pauline Chemning Korikwiang	Kenya	25:26
8	Lineth Chepkurui	Kenya	25:28
9	Genzebe Dibaba	Ethiopia	25:36
10	Belaynesh Oljira	Ethiopia	25:40
11	Hiwot Ayalew	Ethiopia	25:42
12	Shitaye Eshete	Bahrain	25:53
Full results

Teams
Rank	Team	Points
Gold medal	Kenya: Vivian Jepkemoi Cheruiyot / 1; Linet Chepkwemoi Masai / 2; Priscah Jepleting Cherono / 5; Pauline Chemning Korikwiang / 7; (Lineth Chepkurui) / (8); (Sylvia Jebiwott Kibet) / (13)	15
Silver medal	Ethiopia: Meselech Melkamu / 4; Wude Ayalew / 6; Genzebe Dibaba / 9; Beleynesh Oljira / 10; (Hiwot Ayalew) / (11); (Merima Mohammed) / (15)	29
Bronze medal	United States: Shalane Flanagan / 3; Molly Huddle / 17; Magdalena Lewy-Boulet / 18; Blake Russell / 19; Alissa Doehla / (28); (Lisa Koll) / (40)	57
4	Bahrain	87
5	United Kingdom	116
6	Uganda	146
7	Japan	160
8	Spain	180
Full results

- Note: Athletes in parentheses did not score for the team result.

=== Junior men's race (8 km) ===
Complete results for junior men and for junior men's teams were published.

Individual race
Rank	Athlete	Country	Time (m:s)
Gold medal	Geoffrey Kipsang Kamworor	Kenya	22:21
Silver medal	Thomas Ayeko	Uganda	22:27
Bronze medal	Patrick Mutunga Mwikya	Kenya	22:32
4	Bonsa Dida	Ethiopia	22:39
5	Fikadu Haftu	Ethiopia	22:43
6	James Gitahi Rungaru	Kenya	22:43
7	Muktar Edris	Ethiopia	22:44
8	Yitayal Atnafu	Ethiopia	22:53
9	Jacob Araptany	Uganda	23:03
10	Isaiah Kiplangat Koech	Kenya	23:10
11	Tesfaye Cheru	Ethiopia	23:16
12	Samson Gebreyohannes	Eritrea	23:18
Full results

Teams
Rank	Team	Points
Gold medal	Kenya: Geoffrey Kipsang Kamworor / 1; Patrick Mutunga Mwikya / 3; James Gitahi Rungaru / 6; Isiah Kiplangat Koech / 10; (Philemon Kipchumba Yator) / (13); (Justine Kiprop Cheruiyot) / (14)	20
Silver medal	Ethiopia: Bonsa Dida / 4; Fikadu Haftu / 5; Muktar Edris / 7; Yitayal Atnafu / 8; (Tesfaye Cheru) / (11); (Teshome Tafese) / (19)	24
Bronze medal	Uganda: Thomas Ayeko / 2; Jacob Araptany / 9; Peter Kibet / 15; Phillip Kipyego / 24; (Daniel Rotich) / (25)	50
4	Eritrea	65
5	Morocco	106
6	South Africa	123
7	Japan	148
8	United States	153
Full results

- Note: Athletes in parentheses did not score for the team result.

=== Junior women's race (6 km) ===
Complete results for junior women and for junior women's teams were published.

Individual race
Rank	Athlete	Country	Time (m:s)
Gold medal	Faith Kipyegon	Kenya	18:53
Silver medal	Genet Yalew	Ethiopia	18:54
Bronze medal	Azemra Gebru	Ethiopia	18:54
4	Waganesh Mekasha	Ethiopia	18:59
5	Janeth Kisa	Kenya	19:08
6	Nancy Chepkwemoi	Kenya	19:20
7	Purity Cherotich Rionoripo	Kenya	19:24
8	Emebet Anteneh	Ethiopia	19:29
9	Brillian Jepkorir Kipkoech	Kenya	19:33
10	Buze Diriba	Ethiopia	19:34
11	Alem Mokonnin	Ethiopia	19:39
12	Katsuki Suga	Japan	19:49
Full results

Teams
Rank	Team	Points
Gold medal	Ethiopia: Genet Yalew / 2; Azemra Gebru / 3; Waganesh Mekasha / 4; Emebet Anteneh / 8; (Buze Diriba) / (10); (Alem Mokonnin) / (11)	17
Silver medal	Kenya: Faith Kipyegon / 1; Janeth Kisa / 5; Nancy Chepkwemoi / 6; Purity Cherotich Rionoripo / 7; (Brillian Jepkorir Kipkoech) / (9); (Naom Chepngeno Mitei) / (16)	19
Bronze medal	Japan: Katsuki Suga / 12; Tomoka Kimura / 13; Yuriko Kosaki / 23; Risa Yokoe / 27; (Risa Shibuya) / (30); (Natsumi Yoshida) / (34)	75
4	Eritrea	89
5	United Kingdom	106
6	Uganda	110
7	United States	144
8	Morocco	146
Full results

- Note: Athletes in parentheses did not score for the team result.

== Medal table (unofficial) ==
Rank	Nation	Gold	Silver	Bronze	Total
1	Kenya	6	3	2	11
2	Ethiopia	2	4	1	7
3	Uganda	0	1	2	3
4	United States	0	0	2	2
5	Japan	0	0	1	1
Totals (5 entries)		8	8	8	24

- Note: Totals include both individual and team medals, with medals in the team competition counting as one medal.

== Participation ==
According to an unofficial count, 423 athletes from 51 countries participated. This is in agreement with the official numbers as published. The announced athletes of Iraq and Nigeria did not show.

- Algeria (16)
- Angola (1)
- Argentina (2)
- Australia (15)
- Bahrain (13)
- Belarus (2)
- Belgium (1)
- Botswana (4)
- Brazil (12)
- Bulgaria (2)
- Canada (18)
- Cape Verde (1)
- Cayman Islands (1)
- China (3)
- Denmark (1)
- Equatorial Guinea (1)
- Eritrea (20)
- Ethiopia (24)
- France (9)
- Germany (1)
- Ireland (3)
- Israel (1)
- Italy (11)
- Japan (22)
- Jordan (2)
- Kenya (24)
- Lesotho (2)
- Mexico (3)
- Morocco (22)
- New Zealand (6)
- Norway (5)
- Peru (5)
- Poland (2)
- Portugal (14)
- Romania (1)
- Russia (6)
- Rwanda (4)
- Seychelles (3)
- Serbia (1)
- South Africa (23)
- Spain (24)
- Sudan (4)
- Switzerland (2)
- Tajikistan (1)
- Tunisia (14)
- Uganda (19)
- United Arab Emirates (2)
- United Kingdom (24)
- United States (24)
- Venezuela (1)
- Zimbabwe (1)

== See also ==
- 2011 IAAF World Cross Country Championships – Senior men's race
- 2011 IAAF World Cross Country Championships – Junior men's race
- 2011 IAAF World Cross Country Championships – Senior women's race
- 2011 IAAF World Cross Country Championships – Junior women's race
- 2011 in athletics (track and field)
