= Janet Kisa =

Kenyan runner (born 1992)

Medal record

Women's athletics

Representing Kenya

World Cross Country Championships
Gold medal – first place	2013 Bydgoszcz	Team race

African Championships
Bronze medal – third place	2014 Marrakesh	5000 m

African Cross Country Championships
Silver medal – second place	2014 Kampala	Senior race

Commonwealth Games
Silver medal – second place	2014 Glasgow	5000 m

Janet Kisa (born 5 December 1992) is a Kenyan professional middle- and long-distance runner who competes in track, cross country, and road running events.

Kisa won the silver medal in the 5000 metres at the 2014 Commonwealth Games. She was a team gold medallist at the 2013 IAAF World Cross Country Championships and runner-up at the 2014 African Cross Country Championships.

== Career ==
Born near Mount Elgon in Kenya, she began competing as a teenager and placed second at the 2009 Shoe4Africa 5km race behind the more experienced Helena Kirop. She established herself at national level in 2011 by winning the junior women's division of the Kenyan Cross Country Championships. At the 2011 IAAF World Cross Country Championships she came fifth in the junior race, helping Kenya to the team silver medals with the individual champion Faith Chepngetich Kipyegon. Her next international appearance brought her the first individual medal of her career: at the 2011 African Junior Athletics Championships she was the silver medallist, forming a Kenyan 1–2 in the 5000 metres with teammate Caroline Chepkoech.

Kisa joined up with the Kenyan Police team in 2012 and placed fifth in their cross country championships and second in their 5000 m race that year. She made her IAAF Diamond League debut in Doha, running a personal best of 8:51.63 minutes for seventh over the 3000 metres. A 5000 m best of 14:57.68 minutes followed at the IAAF Rabat Meeting, where she was runner-up. She tried to make the Kenyan Olympic team but came fifth at the trials. In 2013, she placed third at the Police Cross Country and gained her first senior selection with the same placing at the Kenyan Championships. Kisa's sixth-place finish in the senior race at the 2013 IAAF World Cross Country Championships brought her a share in the team gold medals with Kenya.

The 2014 African Cross Country Championships saw Kisa place second to Faith Chepngetich Kipyegon and the Kenyan women swept the medals with Alice Nawowuna in third. She made her debut over the half marathon distance in Nice in April and won in a time of 71:01 minutes by a margin of over 2 minutes. On the track she placed fifth at the Golden Gala in a 5000 m personal best of 14:52.59 minutes then was runner-up at the national championships. This brought her selection for Kenya at the 2014 Commonwealth Games. In the 5000 m Commonwealth final Kisa was the runner-up behind Mercy Cherono, winning the first senior track medal of her career.

From the beginning of 2016 she is coached by the Italian Renato Canova. In the first competitions of the new season, she improved her PB of 3000m (8:32.0 in Doha on 6 May) and of 5000m (14:38.70 in Rabat on 22 May).

== Personal bests ==
- 1500 metres – 4:14.03 min (2016)
- 3000 metres – 8:28.33 min (2016)
- 5000 metres – 14:38.70 min (2016)
- 10K run – 33:55 min (2013)
- Half marathon – 71:01 min (2014)

== International competition record ==
Year	Competition	Venue	Position	Event	Notes
2011	World Cross Country Championships	Punta Umbría, Spain	5th	Junior race	
2011	World Cross Country Championships	Punta Umbría, Spain	2nd	Junior team	
2011	African Junior Championships	Gaborone, Botswana	2nd	5000 metres	
2013	World Cross Country Championships	Bydgoszcz, Poland	5th	Senior race	
2013	World Cross Country Championships	Bydgoszcz, Poland	1st	Senior team	
2014	African Cross Country Championships	Kampala, Uganda	2nd	Senior race	
2014	African Cross Country Championships	Kampala, Uganda	1st	Senior team	
2014	Commonwealth Games	Glasgow, United Kingdom	2nd	5000 metres	
2015	World Championships	Beijing, China	6th	5000 metres	15:02.68
