= Dickson Huru =

Ugandan long-distance runner

Medal record

Men's athletics

Representing Uganda

World Cross Country Championships
Bronze medal – third place	2011 Punta Umbría	Team race

Dickson Huru (born 10 September 1990) is a Ugandan long-distance runner who competes in cross country running competitions. He has represented his country in the discipline four times at the IAAF World Cross Country Championships, sharing the team bronze medal in 2011.

Huru made his international debut in the junior race at the 2007 IAAF World Cross Country Championships, where he came 23rd and placed fourth in the team race with Uganda. His first international medal followed the year after at the 2008 Commonwealth Youth Games as he finished in second place to compatriot Moses Kibet in the 5000 metres. At the 2009 IAAF World Cross Country Championships he improved in the junior race to 17th place, but again the Ugandan team was one place off the medals. He set a series of personal bests on the track in Europe that year, running 3:53.57 minutes for the 1500 metres, 7:53.71 minutes for the 3000 metres and 13:32.28 minutes for the 5000 metres.

Huru made his senior debut at the 2010 IAAF World Cross Country Championships and he came 27th and took was fourth in the team race for a third consecutive time. A 19th place finish at the 2011 senior race brought him his first team medal as he, Stephen Kiprotich, Moses Ndiema Kipsiro and Geofrey Kusuro were the bronze medallists. In July that year he represented Uganda on the track at the 2011 Military World Games, but did not get past the heats of the 5000 m. He was absent all of 2012 and most of the next year, but made a successful return in November 2013 by winning the Cross Internacional de Soria race in Spain.

== Personal bests ==
- 1500 metres – 3:53.57 min (2009)
- 3000 metres – 7:53.71 min (2009)
- 5000 metres – 13:32.28 min (2009)
