= Azmera Gebru =

Ethiopian long-distance runner

Personal information
- Nationality: Ethiopian
- Born: Azmera Gebru; 31 October 1995 (age 30) Maychew, Tigray Region, Ethiopia
- Occupation: Long-distance runner
- Years active: 2010–present

Sport
- Sport: Athletics
- Event(s): Marathon, 5000 metres, 3000 metres

Achievements and titles
- Personal bests: 3000 metres: 8:40.01 (Monaco 2012); 5000 metres: 14:57.38 (Kortrijk 2017); Marathon: 2:20:48 (Amsterdam 2019)
Medal record
Athletics
Representing Ethiopia
| Bronze medal – third place | 2011 Punta Umbría | Junior race |
| Gold medal – first place | 2011 Gaborone | 3000 metres |
World Marathon Majors
| Bronze medal – third place | 2025 Berlin | Marathon |

Azmera Gebru (born 31 October 1995) is an Ethiopian long-distance runner who competes in both track and road events. She won the junior bronze medal at the 2011 IAAF World Cross Country Championships and gold in the 3000 metres at the 2011 African Junior Athletics Championships.

== Career ==
Gebru began her career as a middle-distance runner. In 2011, she won bronze in the junior race at the World Cross Country Championships in Punta Umbría, Spain, before capturing gold in the 3000 metres at the African Junior Championships in Gaborone, Botswana. The following year, she recorded a personal best of 8:40.01 for the 3000 metres in Monaco.

Under the guidance of coach Getamesay Molla, Gebru later transitioned to road running and the marathon distance. In 2019 she finished fifth at the Amsterdam Marathon in 2:20:48, her best time till then. Earlier that year, she was runner-up at the Paris Marathon in 2:22:52.

In 2024, she won the Seville Marathon in 2:22:13, setting a new course record for the event. The following year, she placed third at the Berlin Marathon in 2:20:56, her fastest time since 2019 when she ran 2:20:48.

== Achievements ==
| Year | Race | Place | Position | Time |
|---|---|---|---|---|
| 2011 | IAAF World Cross Country Championships | Punta Umbría | 3rd (Junior race) | 19:50 |
| 2011 | African Junior Athletics Championships | Gaborone | 1st (3000 m) | 9:11.83 |
| 2019 | Paris Marathon | Paris | 2nd (Marathon) | 2:22:52 |
| 2019 | Amsterdam Marathon | Amsterdam | 5th (Marathon) | 2:20:48 |
| 2024 | Seville Marathon | Seville | 1st (Marathon) | 2:22:13 |
| 2025 | Berlin Marathon | Berlin | 3rd (Marathon) | 2:20:56 |
