= 2002 World Junior Championships in Athletics – Women's 5000 metres =

The women's 5000 metres event at the 2002 World Junior Championships in Athletics was held in Kingston, Jamaica, at National Stadium on 21 July.

== Medalists ==
Gold	Meseret Defar; Ethiopia
Silver	Tirunesh Dibaba; Ethiopia
Bronze	Vivian Cheruiyot; Kenya

== Results ==
=== Final ===
21 July

Rank	Name	Nationality	Time	Notes
1st place, gold medalist(s)	Meseret Defar	Ethiopia	15:54.94	
2nd place, silver medalist(s)	Tirunesh Dibaba	Ethiopia	15:55.99	
3rd place, bronze medalist(s)	Vivian Cheruiyot	Kenya	15:56.04	
4	Zhang Yuhong	China	15:58.20	
5	Fujiko Takahashi	Japan	16:02.75	
6	Tatyana Petrova	Russia	16:04.10	
7	Fridah Domongole	Kenya	16:04.71	
8	Elina Lindgren	Finland	16:08.54	
9	Hind Musa	Sudan	16:09.47	
10	Jang Jin-Suk	South Korea	16:17.56	
11	Galina Ignatyeva	Russia	16:23.46	
12	Yoko Miyauchi	Japan	16:38.84	
13	Adrienne Herzog	Netherlands	16:46.53	
14	Sónia Fernandes	Portugal	16:47.44	
15	Agnes Chikwakwa	Malawi	16:56.75	
16	Mira Preradovic	Bosnia and Herzegovina	17:02.48	
17	Snežana Kostic	Yugoslavia	17:05.09	
18	Lindsay Zinn	United States	17:05.99	
19	Laura Zeigle	United States	17:11.37	
20	Alba García	Spain	17:28.03	
21	Daphrose Ndayikunda	Burundi	17:57.02	
22	Chen Shu-Hua	Chinese Taipei	18:02.56	

== Participation ==
According to an unofficial count, 22 athletes from 17 countries participated in the event.

- Bosnia and Herzegovina (1)
- Burundi (1)
- China (1)
- Chinese Taipei (1)
- Ethiopia (2)
- Finland (1)
- Japan (2)
- Kenya (2)
- Malawi (1)
- Netherlands (1)
- Portugal (1)
- Russia (2)
- South Korea (1)
- Spain (1)
- Sudan (1)
- United States (2)
- Yugoslavia (1)
