= Athletics at the 2015 African Games – Men's half marathon =

The men's half marathon event at the 2015 African Games was held on 17 September.

== Results ==
Rank	Name	Nationality	Time	Notes
1st place, gold medalist(s)	Zersenay Tadese	Eritrea	1:03:11	
2nd place, silver medalist(s)	Luka Kanda	Kenya	1:03:27	
3rd place, bronze medalist(s)	Hizkel Tewelde	Eritrea	1:03:39	
4	Samsom Gebreyohannes	Eritrea	1:04:14	
5	Guye Adola	Ethiopia	1:04:22	
6	Azmeraw Mengistu	Ethiopia	1:05:18	
7	Fantahun Hunegnaw	Ethiopia	1:05:27	
8	James Rungau	Kenya	1:05:49	
9	Fabiano Joseph Naasi	Tanzania	1:05:56	
10	Suttoali Khoarahlima	Lesotho	1:06:18	
11	Dickson Marwa	Tanzania	1:06:50	
12	Gsepo Mathibelle	Lesotho	1:07:22	
13	Emmanuel Giniki	Tanzania	1:07:49	
14	Eric Semba Meriadec	Republic of the Congo	1:08:22	
15	Marian Eesou	South Africa	1:09:32	
16	Mande Ilunga	DR Congo	1:09:33	SB
17	Namupala Reonard	Namibia	1:10:58	
18	Steve Guelor Vedze	Republic of the Congo	1:13:07	
19	Severin N'dri Konan	Ivory Coast	1:16:07	SB
	Rony Ampion	Republic of the Congo	DNF	
	Nabara Oumarou Barmou	Niger	DNF	
	Wissen Hosni	Tunisia	DNF	
