= Dino Sefir =

Ethiopian long-distance runner

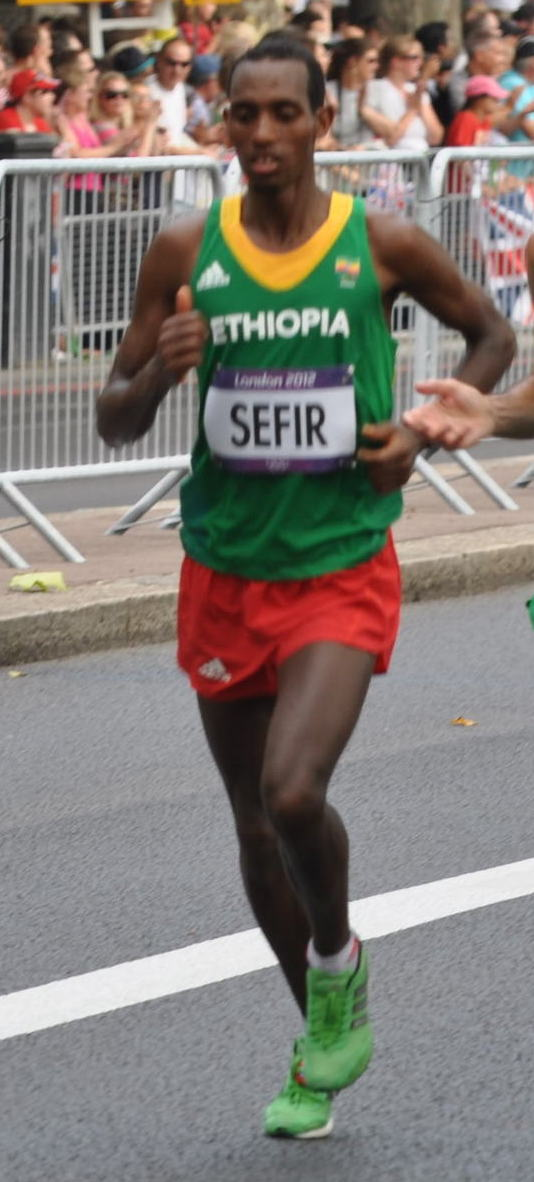

Personal information
- Born: May 28, 1988 (age 38)
- Height: 1.78 m (5 ft 10 in)
- Weight: 61 kg (134 lb)

Sport
- Country: Ethiopia
- Sport: Athletics
- Event: Marathon

Dino Sefir Kemal (born 28 May 1988) is an Ethiopian long-distance runner. He was one of three members of the Ethiopian team who competed in the marathon at the 2012 Summer Olympics in London, United Kingdom. He qualified with a time of 2:04:50 at the 2012 Dubai Marathon, one of the top five personal records among the marathon entrants at the 2012 Olympics. He is coached by Renato Canova.

== Career ==
Born in the Shewa region of Ethiopia, Dino made his first impact internationally with a bronze medal in the 5000 metres at the 2007 African Junior Athletics Championships, finishing behind Mathew Kisorio and Dejen Gebremeskel. He travelled abroad for the first time in 2008 and set a best of 13:11.69 minutes for the distance at the Golden Spike Ostrava.

He broke through as a senior athlete in 2009, winning the Lotto Cross Cup de Hannut and finishing runner-up at the Cross Ouest France. He gained his first major international selection as a result and placed 15th at the 2009 IAAF World Cross Country Championships. He was runner-up over 5000 metres at the Ethiopian Athletics Championships and set a best of 28:39 minutes for the 10K run at the World 10K Bangalore at the end of the year. The focus of his 2010 season was a move up to the marathon distance, but he made only a modest debut at the low-key Maratón de Castellón, finishing eighth in a time of 2:20:36 hours.

Third place at the Jan Meda Cross Country saw him chosen for the 2011 IAAF World Cross Country Championships and there he shared in the team silver medal with Ethiopia through his twelfth-place finish. A month later he won the Humarathon half marathon race with a course record of 59:42 minutes – a time which established him among the world's top road runners. He was very active in May: he won the 15 km du Puy-en-Velay, placed second at the national championships in the 10,000 m, then finished third at the Ottawa Marathon with a much improved best of 2:10:33 hours. Dino made his senior track debut at September's 2011 All-Africa Games and set a new personal best of 28:23.40 minuties for the 10,000 m, but did not win a medal.

Dino's run at the 2013 Dubai Marathon raised him to eighth place in the all-time marathon lists, as he was runner-up to Ayele Abshero with a time of 2:04:50 hours – this was the second fastest non-winning time at that point. He was selected for the Ethiopian marathon team at the 2012 Olympic Games, but he could not repeat his earlier form and dropped out of the Olympic race.

His next marathon outing came at the 2013 Tokyo Marathon, but his time of 2:09:13 hours saw him finish eighth in the field. Dino took victory at the Nice Half Marathon that April. He did not perform well in the rest of the season, finishing 14th in Bangalore and tenth at the Portugal Half Marathon and Falmouth Road Race. He entered the Frankfurt Marathon, but was some way off his best, recording 2:09:22 hours for seventh.

He won the 2016 Barcelona Marathon recording 2:09:03 hours, on 13 March.

== Competition record ==
Year	Competition	Venue	Position	Event	Notes
2007	African Junior Championships	Ouagadougou, Burkina Faso	3rd	5000 metres	
2009	World Cross Country Championships	Amman, Jordan	15th	Senior race	
2011	World Cross Country Championships	Punta Umbría, Spain	12th	Senior race	
2011	World Cross Country Championships	Punta Umbría, Spain	3rd	Team race	
2011	All-Africa Games	Maputo, Mozambique	5th	10,000 metres	
2012	Olympic Games	London, United Kingdom	DNF	Marathon	

== Personal bests ==
- 3000 metres – 7:44.37 min (2009)
- 5000 metres – 13:11.69 min (2008)
- 10,000 metres – 28:23.40 min (2011)
- Half marathon – 59:42 min (2011)
- Marathon – 2:04:50 (2012)
