= Tinashe Mutanga =

Zimbabwean sprinter

Personal information
- Nationality: Zimbabwe
- Born: 27 January 1993 (age 33)
- Height: 1.60 m (5 ft 3 in)

Sport
- Sport: Running
- Events: 100 metres, 200 metres

Achievements and titles
- Personal bests: 100 m: 10.72 (Singapore 2010); 200 m: 20.99 (Gaborone 2011)
Medal record
Men's athletics
Representing Zimbabwe
African Junior Championships
Silver medal – second place	2011 Gaborone	100 m
Silver medal – second place	2011 Gaborone	200 m
Silver medal – second place	2011 Gaborone	4×400 m relay

Tinashe Samuel Mutanga (born 27 January 1993) is a Zimbabwean sprinter who specialises in the 100 metres.

Mutanga won a silver medal in the 100 metres at the 2011 African Junior Athletics Championships in Gaborone, Botswana. He also won the 100 m and 200 m at the Africa Youth Games in 2010.

At the inaugural 2010 Summer Youth Olympics, he finished sixth in the 100 metres and fourth in the medley relay.
