= Yuma Hattori =

Japanese long-distance runner

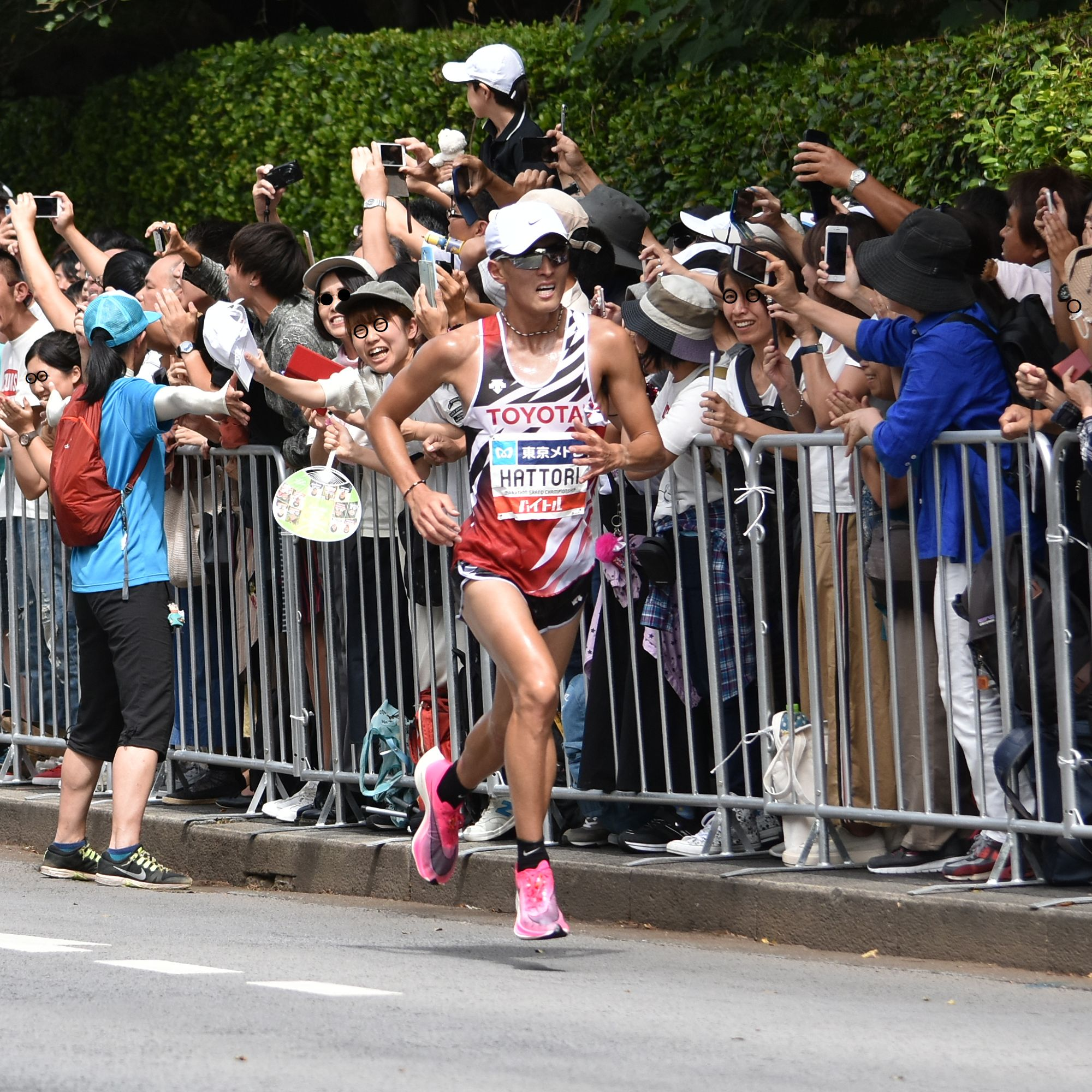
- Hattori at the 2019 Marathon Grand Championship

Personal information
- Born: 13 November 1993 (age 32) Tōkamachi, Japan
- Height: 1.76 m (5 ft 9 in)
- Weight: 61 kg (134 lb)

Sport
- Sport: Athletics
- Events: 10000 metres; Half marathon; Marathon
- University team: Toyo University

Yuma Hattori (Japanese: 服部勇馬, romanized: Hattori Yūma; born 13 November 1993) is a Japanese long-distance runner.

In 2018, he won the Fukuoka Marathon in a time of 2:07:27. He qualified for the marathon at the 2020 Summer Olympics by finishing second in the 2019 Marathon Grand Championship with a time of 2:11.36.

== Personal bests ==
Outdoor

- 5000 metres – 13:36.76 (Kitami 2015)
- 10000 metres – 27:47.55 (Kumagaya 2020)
- Half marathon – 1:01:40 (Ústí nad Labem 2018)
- Marathon – 2:07:27 (Fukuoka 2018)
