= Rehaset Mehari =

Eritrean long-distance runner

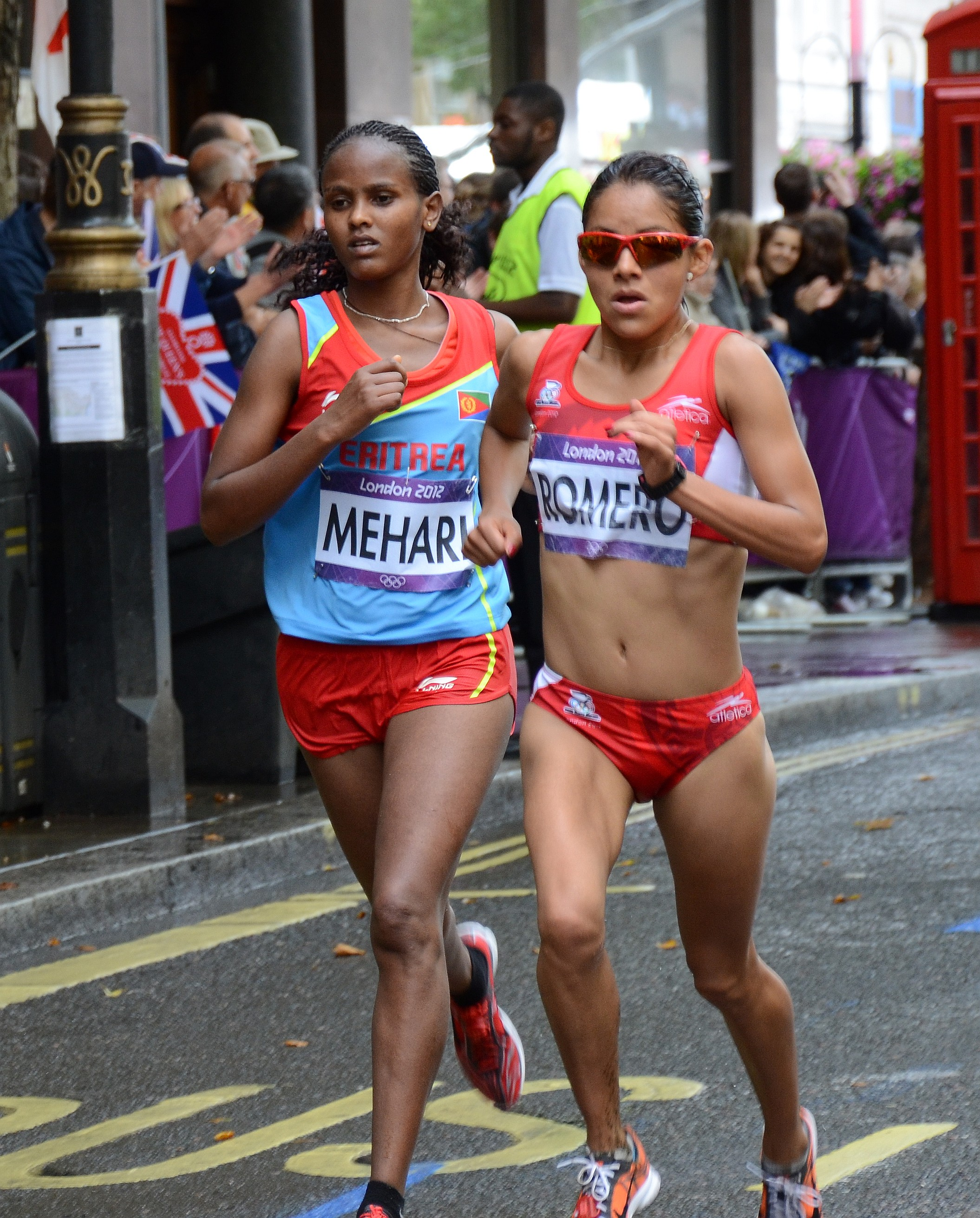
- Mehari in the 2012 Summer Olympics marathon

Personal information
- Born: March 5, 1989 (age 36)
- Height: 1.65 m (5 ft 5 in)
- Weight: 51 kg (112 lb)

Sport
- Country: Eritrea
- Sport: Athletics
- Event: Marathon

Rehaset Mehari (born March 5, 1989, in Agertsiot) is an Eritrean long-distance runner. She competed in the marathon at the 2012 Summer Olympics, placing 59th with a time of 2:35:49.
