= 2011 African Junior Athletics Championships =

10th African Junior Championships
- Dates: 12–15 May
- Host city: Gaborone, Botswana
- Venue: University of Botswana Stadium
- Level: Under-20
- Events: 44

The 2011 African Junior Athletics Championships were held at the University of Botswana Stadium in Gaborone, Botswana from 12 to 15 May. It was the tenth edition of the continental athletics tournament for African athletes aged 19 years or younger. Over 700 athletes from 28 countries announced their desire to participate in the event over four days of track and field competitions, which featured 22 events from men and 22 events for women.

South Africa topped the medal table with thirteen gold and silver medals. Ethiopia and Egypt both won six events, while Kenya and Nigeria rounded out the top five. Seventeen nations reached the medal table at the competition. El Mehdi Kabbachi was a double gold medallist for Morocco, winning both the men's long and triple jump competitions. Namibian thrower Charlene Engelbrecht won both her country's medals with runner-up performances in the shot put and discus.

Among the other medallists, Uganda's Annet Negesa took an 800 m/1500 m double, including a Ugandan record in the latter event. The women's Egyptian record in the high jump was broken by Besnet Moussad Mohamed, who won gold. Aynalem Eshetu of Ethiopia improved the African record to win the women's 5000 m walk. Her teammate Magiso Manedo excelled in the sprints: she won the 400 m, set an Ethiopian record to take the 200 m silver medal and anchored the 4 × 400 metres relay team to another national record and the bronze medal.

Outside of the medallists, strong performances came from javelin fourth-placer Adriaan Beukes, who broke the Botswana record, and Phumlile Ndzinisa of Swaziland ran Swazi records in the 200 m and 400 m finals. Further to this, Egypt's Hamada Mohamed (fourth in the 800 m) set an Egyptian junior record.

== Medal summary ==
=== Men ===
Event	Gold		Silver		Bronze	
100 metres	Gideon Trotter (RSA)	10.49	Tinashe Mutanga (ZIM)	10.68	Emile Erasmus (RSA)	10.70
200 metres	Siphelo Ngquboza (RSA)	20.94	Tinashe Mutanga (ZIM)	20.99 PB	Jonathan Mmaju (NGR)	21.58
400 metres	Sadam Koumi (SUD)	46.37 PB	Japhet Samuel (NGR)	46.45 PB	Alphas Kishoyian (KEN)	46.71 PB
800 metres	Mohammed Aman (ETH)	1:46.62	Anthony Chemut (KEN)	1:47.16 PB	Nigel Amos (BOT)	1:47.38 NJR
1500 metres	Hillary Maiyo (KEN)	3:35.43 PB	Geofrey Barusei (KEN)	3:35.54 PB	Soresa Fida (ETH)	3:36.38 PB
5000 metres	Yitayal Atnafu Zerihun (ETH)	13:38.52 PB	Abraham Kasongor (KEN)	13:39.17 PB	Thomas Ayeko (UGA)	13:40.04 PB
10,000 metres	Geoffrey Kirui (KEN)	27:55.74 PB, CR	Nicholas Togom (KEN)	28:23.22 PB	Thomas Ayeko (UGA)	28:27.54 PB
110 metres hurdles	Amadou Ndiaye (SEN)	14.33 PB	Tsepo Lefete (RSA)	14.42	Rami Gharsalli (TUN)	14.49 PB
400 metres hurdles	Abdelmalik Lahoulou (ALG)	51.69 NJR	Jeremiah Mutai (KEN)	51.93	Shaun van Wyk (RSA)	51.96
3000 metres steeplechase	Gilbert Kirui (KEN)	8:25.03 PB	Jairus Kipchoge (KEN)	8:28.08 PB	Jacob Araptany (UGA)	8:30.63
4 × 100 metres relay	Nigeria (NGR); Emuobonuvie Mamus; Harry Chukwudike; Jonathan Mmaju; Toyin Oladimeji	40.98	Zimbabwe (ZIM); Fungah Beukerwa; Abdul Simbili; Felby Mukucha; Tinashe Mutanga	41.66	Mauritius (MRI); Thierry Ferdinand; Darren Paul; Jonathan Bardottier; Christopher Quenette	41.81
4 × 400 metres relay	Sudan (SUD); Sadam Koumi; Abd Elraman Nadir; Mohamed Ahmed Ismail; Awad Elkarim Maki	3:09.77	Kenya (KEN); Jeremiah Mutai; Christopher Ngetich; Anthony Chemut; Alphas Kishoyian	3:10.17	South Africa (RSA); Gideon Trotter; Fernando Ledimo; Taariq Solomons; Shaun van Wyk	3:11.87
10,000 m walk	Tewfik Yesref (ALG)	46:04.04	Buzuneh Bekele (ETH)	47:33.18 PB	Daba Gemeda (ETH)	49:15.52 PB
High jump	Hichem Krim (ALG)	2.06 m	Jan Steytler (RSA)	2.04 m PB	Aabobe Tshwanelo (BOT)	2.04 m PB
Pole vault	Michael Cilliers (RSA)	4.90 m PB	Jako Burgers (RSA)	4.80 m PB	Hamza Harbaoui (TUN)	4.40 m PB
Long jump	El Mehdi Kabbachi (MAR)	7.69 m	Roelf Pienaar (RSA)	7.55 m	Ojulu Lingo Obang (ETH)	7.45 m PB
Triple jump	El Mehdi Kabbachi (MAR)	15.84 m	Fayçal Meddourene (ALG)	15.69 m PB	Mosheleketi Goabaone (BOT)	15.49 m PB
Shot put	Hisham Abdelhamid Abdelaziz (EGY)	18.11 m	Abdelmoneim El-Sayed (EGY)	18.07 m PB	Johnny Botha (RSA)	17.39 m PB
Discus throw	Amine Atik (MAR)	56.08 m	Charl Grobler (RSA)	52.12 m	Ifeanyi Augustine Nwoye (NGR)	51.41 m PB
Hammer throw	Islam Ahmed Taha (EGY)	68.03 m PB	Donovan Stebbing (RSA)	63.00 m PB	Hesham Lofty Abdel Wahab (EGY)	62.32 m PB
Javelin throw	Rocco van Rooyen (RSA)	75.72 m PB	Dean Goosen (RSA)	68.80 m	Ahmed Samir El Shabramsly (EGY)	68.45 m PB
Decathlon	Ahmad Saber Ahmad (EGY)	6776 pts PB	Jason Roux (RSA)	6416 pts PB	Gobe Khanda (BOT)	5886 pts PB NR

=== Women ===
Event	Gold		Silver		Bronze	
100 metres	Josephine Omaka (NGR)	11.97	Leungo Mathaku (BOT)	12.01 PB	Chante van Tonder (RSA)	12.05
200 metres	Sonja van der Merwe (RSA)	23.78 PB	Magiso Manedo (ETH)	23.90 NR	Nkiruka Uwakwe (NGR)	23.94
400 metres	Magiso Manedo (ETH)	52.09 PB	Justine Palframan (RSA)	52.93 PB	Margaret Etim (NGR)	53.23
800 metres	Annet Negesa (UGA)	2:04.94	Cherono Koech (KEN)	2:06.49	Gerezine Gebremariam (ETH)	2:07.16 PB
1500 metres	Annet Negesa (UGA)	4:09.17 NR	Nancy Chepkwemoi (KEN)	4:09.25 PB	Stacy Ndiwa (KEN)	4:15.84 PB
3000 metres	Azemra Gebru (ETH)	9:11.84 PB	Purity Rionoripo (KEN)	9:14.58	Waganesh Mekasha (ETH)	9:16.82
5000 metres	Caroline Chepkoech (KEN)	15:24.66 PB	Janeth Kisa (KEN)	15:24.75 PB	Genet Yalew (ETH)	15:27.96
100 metres hurdles	Kayla Gilbert (RSA)	14.25	Liriska Botha (RSA)	14.39	Oarabile Babolayi (BOT)	14.40 NR
400 metres hurdles	Jean-Marie Senekal (RSA)	59.21	Tasabih Mohamed (SUD)	59.85 PB	Oarabile Babolayi (BOT)	1:00:88 PB
3000 metres steeplechase	Birtukan Adamu (ETH)	9:53.80	Zewdnesh Belachew (ETH)	10:02.99 PB	Veronica Ngososei (KEN)	10:06.52
4 × 100 metres relay	South Africa (RSA); Samantha Pretorius; Sonja van der Merwe; Zanri van der Merwe; Chante van Tonder	46.11	Nigeria (NGR); Margaret Benson; Goodness Thomas; Wisdom Isoken; Josephine Omaka	46.71	Botswana (BOT); Gofaone Ditsheko; Ontiretse Molapisi; Mpho Mangope; Leungo Mathaku	48.46
4 × 400 metres relay	South Africa (RSA); Anri Steyn; Sonja van der Merwe; Jean-Marie Senekal; Justine Palframan	3:38.16	Nigeria (NGR); Margaret Etim; Nkiruka Uwakwe; Charity Adegoke; Wisdom Isoken	3:38.87	Ethiopia (ETH); Abrhaley Takere; Getachew Alula; Gerezine Gebremariam; Magiso Manedo	3:39.82 NR
5000 m walk	Aynalem Eshetu (ETH)	22:59.19 AR	Mengistu Ayele (ETH)	24:55.73 PB	Tahani Ghazal (TUN)	26:06.04 PB
High jump	Besnet Moussad Mohamed (EGY)	1.81 m NR	Lissa Labiche (SEY)	1.70 m	Daunia Menni (MAR)	1.65 m PB
Pole vault	Dorra Mahfoudhi (TUN)	3.40 m	Jeanne Van Dyk (RSA) Mariska Smit (RSA)	3.35 m PB	Not awarded	
Long jump	Samantha Pretorius (RSA)	5.90 m	Kyla Gilbert (RSA)	5.65 m	Sangone Kandji (SEN)	5.59 m PB
Triple jump	Valentina Da Rocha (RSA)	12.46 m	Lerato Schele (LES)	12.07 m PB	Danelle Erwee (RSA)	12.05 m PB
Shot put	Nkechi Chime (NGR)	13.89 m	Charlene Engelbrecht (NAM)	13.73 m NJR PB	Ibrahim Fadya Saad (EGY)	13.26 m PB
Discus throw	Ischke Senekal (RSA)	49.90 m PB	Charlene Engelbrecht (NAM)	46.10 m PB	Simone Meyer (RSA)	45.41 m
Hammer throw	Rana Ahmad Taha (EGY)	59.94 m	Nehal Kamal Fahmy (EGY)	57.49 m PB	Nabiha Gueddah (TUN)	52.19 m NJR
Javelin throw	Liezel de Swardt (RSA)	48.28 m PB	Hanane Daoudi (MAR)	43.94 m PB	Leandri Swiegers (RSA)	43.26 m PB
Heptathlon	Haris Radwa Faty (EGY)	4839 pts NR	Francis Kemi (NGR)	4836 pts PB	Lissa Labiche (SEY)	4663 pts PB

== Medal table ==
* Host nation (Botswana)

Rank	Nation	Gold	Silver	Bronze	Total
1	South Africa	13	13	8	34
2	Ethiopia	6	4	7	17
3	Egypt	6	2	3	11
4	Kenya	4	11	3	18
5	Nigeria	3	4	4	11
6	Morocco	3	1	1	5
7	Algeria	3	1	0	4
8	Sudan	2	1	0	3
9	Uganda	2	0	3	5
10	Tunisia	1	0	4	5
11	Senegal	1	0	1	2
12	Zimbabwe	0	3	0	3
13	Namibia	0	2	0	2
14	Botswana*	0	1	7	8
15	Seychelles	0	1	1	2
16	Lesotho	0	1	0	1
17	Mauritius	0	0	1	1
Totals (17 entries)		44	45	43	132

== Participation ==
- Algeria
- Botswana
- Cameroon
- Djibouti
- Ethiopia
- Egypt
- Kenya
- Lesotho
- Malawi
- Mauritius
- Morocco
- Namibia
- Nigeria
- Senegal
- Seychelles
- South Africa
- Sudan
- Swaziland
- Tanzania
- Tunisia
- Uganda
- Zambia
- Zimbabwe
