= Thomas Ayeko =

Ugandan long-distance runner

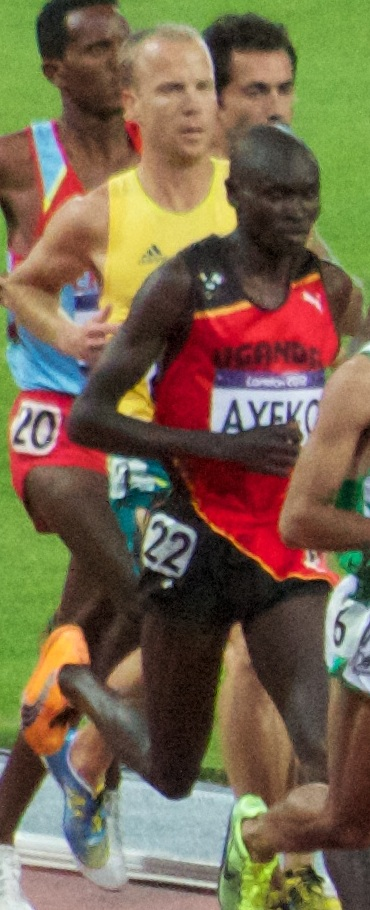
- Thomas Ayeko at the 2012 Summer Olympics

Personal information
- Born: 10 February 1992 (age 33) Bukwo District, Uganda

Sport
- Sport: Track and field
- Event(s): 5000 metres, 10,000 metres

Thomas Ayeko (born 10 February 1992) is a Ugandan professional long-distance runner. At the 2012 Summer Olympics, he competed in the 10,000 metres, finishing 16th overall.

== Career ==
Thomas Ayeko is a Ugandan long-distance runner who is famous for his exploits in the marathon and 10,000 meters events. He has attained international prominence due to his performances in road running, cross-country, and track.

== Early career ==
Ayeko made his international debut at the 2010 IAAF World Cross Country Championships, finishing 18th and helping Uganda to win a bronze junior team medal.

Ayeko finished second in the junior race at the 2011 IAAF World Cross Country Championships, behind Kenya's Geoffrey Kamworor. Later that year, he won bronze medals in the 5000 metres and 10,000 metres at the 2011 African Junior Athletics Championships.

== Transition to Senior Competitions ==
Ayeko concentrated on track running and ran personal bests of 13:23.25 minutes over 5,000 meters and 27:43.22 minutes over 10,000 meters in 2012. He ran in the 2012 London Summer Olympics, where he finished with a 16th position in the 10,000 meters.

== 2013 and Other Notable Performances ==
Ayeko had notable performances in 2013, winning the Antrim Cross Country in Northern Ireland and taking second place at the Cross de San Sebastián in Spain (IAAF).

He placed 4th at the Cinque Mulini in Italy, one of the oldest cross-country races in the world, and was runner-up in the Ugandan 10,000 meters championships .

At the 2013 World Championships in Athletics in Moscow, Russia, Ayeko finished 11th in the 10,000 meters with a personal best time of 27:40.96 minutes (IAAF).

Later that year, Ayeko made his half marathon debut at the Great Birmingham Run in the United Kingdom, winning with a time of 1:02:32 hours (BBC Sport).

== Subsequent Achievements ==
- 2015: Ayeko won the Senior Men's race at the IAAF Antrim International Cross Country in Northern Ireland.
- 2018: He earned a bronze medal at the African Cross Country Championships in Chlef, Algeria.
- 2019: Ayeko finished 7th individually and was part of the Ugandan team that won the gold medal at the World Cross-Country Championships in Aarhus, Denmark.
- 2020: Ayeko participated in the INEOS 1:59 Challenge, supporting Eliud Kipchoge’s attempt to break the marathon world record.

== Personal Bests ==
- 5,000 meters: 13:23.25 minutes
- 10,000 meters: 27:40.96 minutes
- Half Marathon: 1:00:26 hours
- Marathon: 2:12:17 hours
