= Filomena Costa =

Portuguese long-distance runner

Personal information
- Born: 22 February 1985 (age 41)

Sport
- Country: Portugal
- Sport: Track and field
- Event: Marathon

Filomena Costa (born 22 February 1985) is a Portuguese long-distance runner. She competed in the marathon event at the 2015 World Championships in Athletics in Beijing, China.
