= Fikadu Haftu =

Ethiopian long-distance runner

Fikadu Haftu (born 21 February 1994) is an Ethiopian long-distance runner.

In age-specific competitions, he finished fifth (and won a team silver medal) in the junior race at the 2011 World Cross Country Championships. He finished fifth in the 10,000 metres at the 2016 African Championships.

His personal best times are 7:52.03 minutes in the 3000 metres, achieved in May 2012 in Ostrava; 13:30.75 minutes in the 5000 metres, achieved in June 2011 in Montreuil-sous-Bois; 28:09.21 minutes in the 10,000 metres, achieved at the 2016 African Championships in Durban; and 59:22 minutes in the half marathon, achieved in October 2017 in Valencia.
