= Punta Umbría =

- Municipality
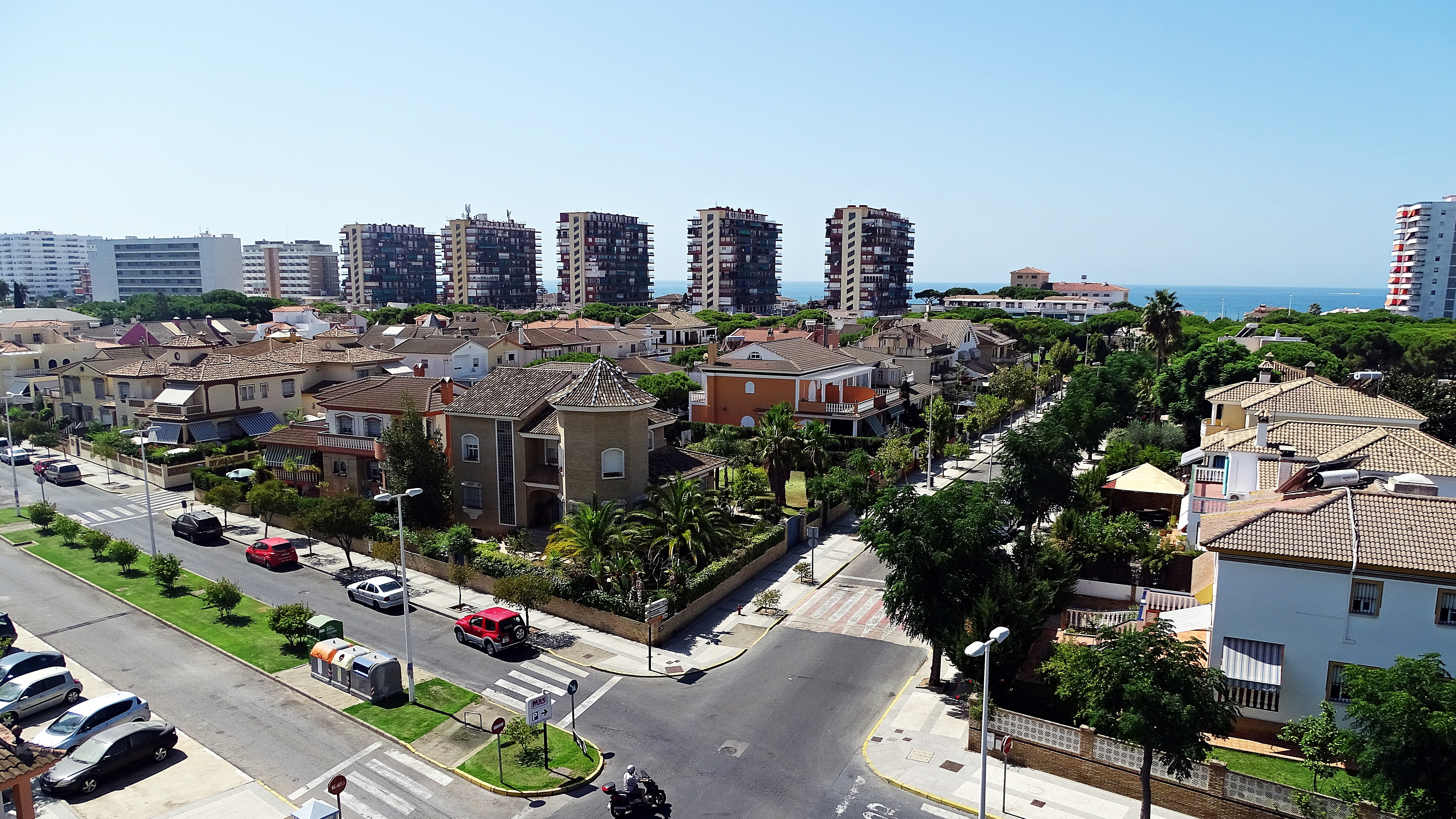

- Flag Seal
- Interactive map of Punta Umbría
- Location in Spain
- Coordinates: 37°10′N 6°57′W
- Country: Spain
- Autonomous community: Andalusia
- Province: Huelva
- Comarca: Huelva

Government
  - Mayor: Gonzalo Rodriguez Nevado

Area
  - Total: 38 km^{2} (15 sq mi)

Population (2025-01-01)
  - Total: 16,281
  - Density: 430/km^{2} (1,100/sq mi)
- Time zone: UTC+1 (CET)
  - Summer (DST): UTC+2 (CEST)
- Website: Official website

Punta Umbría is a town and municipality in the province of Huelva, part of the Spanish autonomous community of Andalusia. It is a fishing village located on the banks of the Rio Odiel river and across the water from the capital, Huelva. It is surrounded by extensive salt marshes and faces Isla Saltes.

The Punta in its name comes from the long point going out to the sea from the beach. During World War II, it was the location where the body of a supposed British Major carrying false top secret documents was washed up. This was part of a disinformation exercise by the British secret service known as Operation Mincemeat.

The Odiel river meets the Atlantic Ocean at Punta Umbria Beach, a 3.8 km urban beach which has been awarded a Blue Flag for its high standards of cleanliness and excellent facilities.

== See also ==
- List of municipalities in Huelva
