= AIMS Best Marathon Runner Award =

Running prize

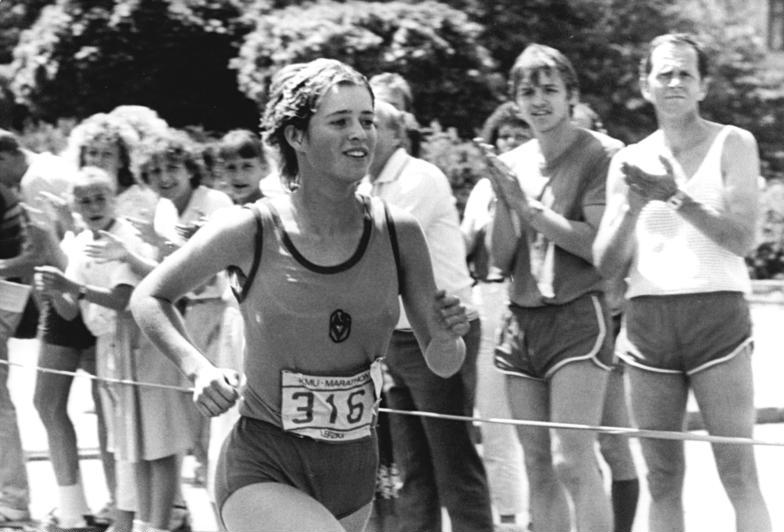
German Uta Pippig is a two-time recipient.

The AIMS Best Marathon Runner Award is a running prize which is given annually by the Association of International Marathons and Distance Races (AIMS) to the top male and female marathon runners of the year. Prior to 2013, the award was known as AIMS World Athlete of the Year Award.

Established in 1992, runners receive nominations from the organisers of AIMS member races (over 300 in number) and the man and woman with the most nominations are each given the AIMS Golden Shoe. The athletic footwear company ASICS is a long-time sponsor of the award. There is no designated period in the year for when the awards are given out, but instead runners are given the Golden Shoe in a ceremony preceding their participation in one of the AIMS races.

Those to have received the award include marathon world record holders Haile Gebrselassie and Paula Radcliffe, who have each been given the honour on three occasions. Kenyan Tegla Loroupe has the most wins to her name; she won her first award in 1995 and took the honour for three consecutive years from 1997 to 1999. Others to have been nominated as AIMS World Athlete of the Year are Lornah Kiplagat, Uta Pippig, Khalid Khannouchi and Catherine Ndereba. The award is typically given to athletes who have performed well in marathon races, half marathons and road running events in general. One exception to this was when Paul Tergat was given the 1996 award in honour of his 10,000 metres world record on the track and his second victory at the IAAF World Cross Country Championships.

== Winners ==
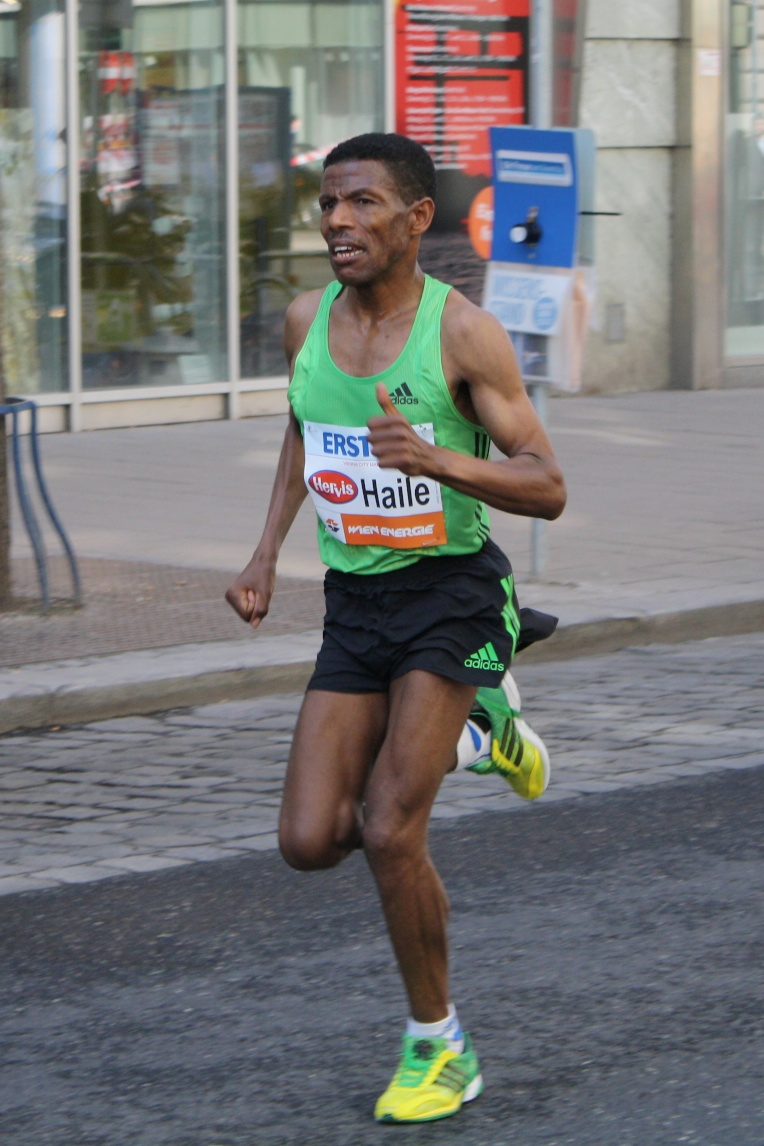
Haile Gebrselassie of Ethiopia has received the award three times.

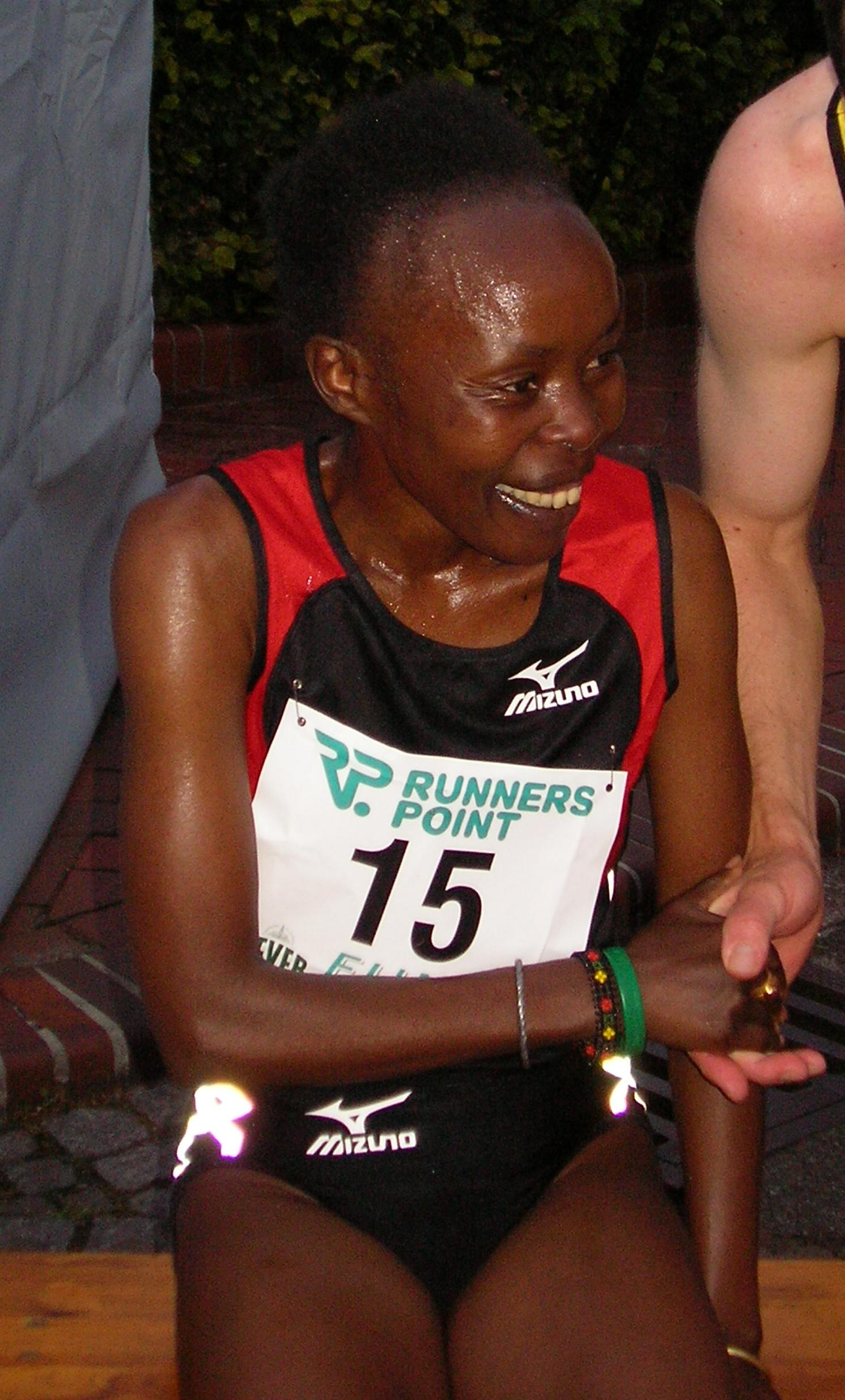
Kenya's Tegla Loroupe is the most decorated athlete with four awards.

Year	Men's winner	Women's winner
1992	Benson Masya (KEN)	Liz McColgan (GBR)
1993	Dionicio Cerón (MEX)	Not awarded
1994	Vincent Rousseau (BEL)	Uta Pippig (GER)
1995	Not awarded	Tegla Loroupe (KEN)
1996	Paul Tergat (KEN)	Uta Pippig (GER)
1997	Josia Thugwane (RSA)	Tegla Loroupe (KEN)
1998	Ronaldo da Costa (BRA)	Tegla Loroupe (KEN)
1999	Abel Antón (ESP)	Tegla Loroupe (KEN)
2000	Gezahegne Abera (ETH)	Naoko Takahashi (JPN)
2001	Josephat Kiprono (KEN)	Catherine Ndereba (KEN)
2002	Khalid Khannouchi (USA)	Paula Radcliffe (GBR)
2003	Paul Tergat (KEN)	Paula Radcliffe (GBR)
2004	Stefano Baldini (ITA)	Mizuki Noguchi (JPN)
2005	Jaouad Gharib (MAR)	Paula Radcliffe (GBR)
2006	Haile Gebrselassie (ETH)	Lornah Kiplagat (NED)
2007	Haile Gebrselassie (ETH)	Lornah Kiplagat (NED)
2008	Samuel Wanjiru (KEN)	Constantina Diță (ROM)
2009	Haile Gebrselassie (ETH)	Mary Keitany (KEN)
2010	Patrick Makau (KEN)	Liliya Shobukhova (RUS)
2011	Geoffrey Mutai (KEN)	Mary Keitany (KEN)
2012	Geoffrey Mutai (KEN)	Tiki Gelana (ETH)
2013	Wilson Kipsang (KEN)	Edna Kiplagat (KEN)
2014	Dennis Kimetto (KEN)	Florence Kiplagat (KEN)
2015	Eliud Kipchoge (KEN)	Mare Dibaba (ETH)
2016	Eliud Kipchoge (KEN)	Jemima Sumgong (KEN)
2017	Eliud Kipchoge (KEN)	Mary Keitany (KEN)
2018	Eliud Kipchoge (KEN)	Gladys Cherono (KEN)
2019	Lelisa Desisa (ETH)	Ruth Chepngetich (KEN)
