= Patrick Makau Musyoki =

Kenyan long-distance runner (born 1985)

Patrick Makau
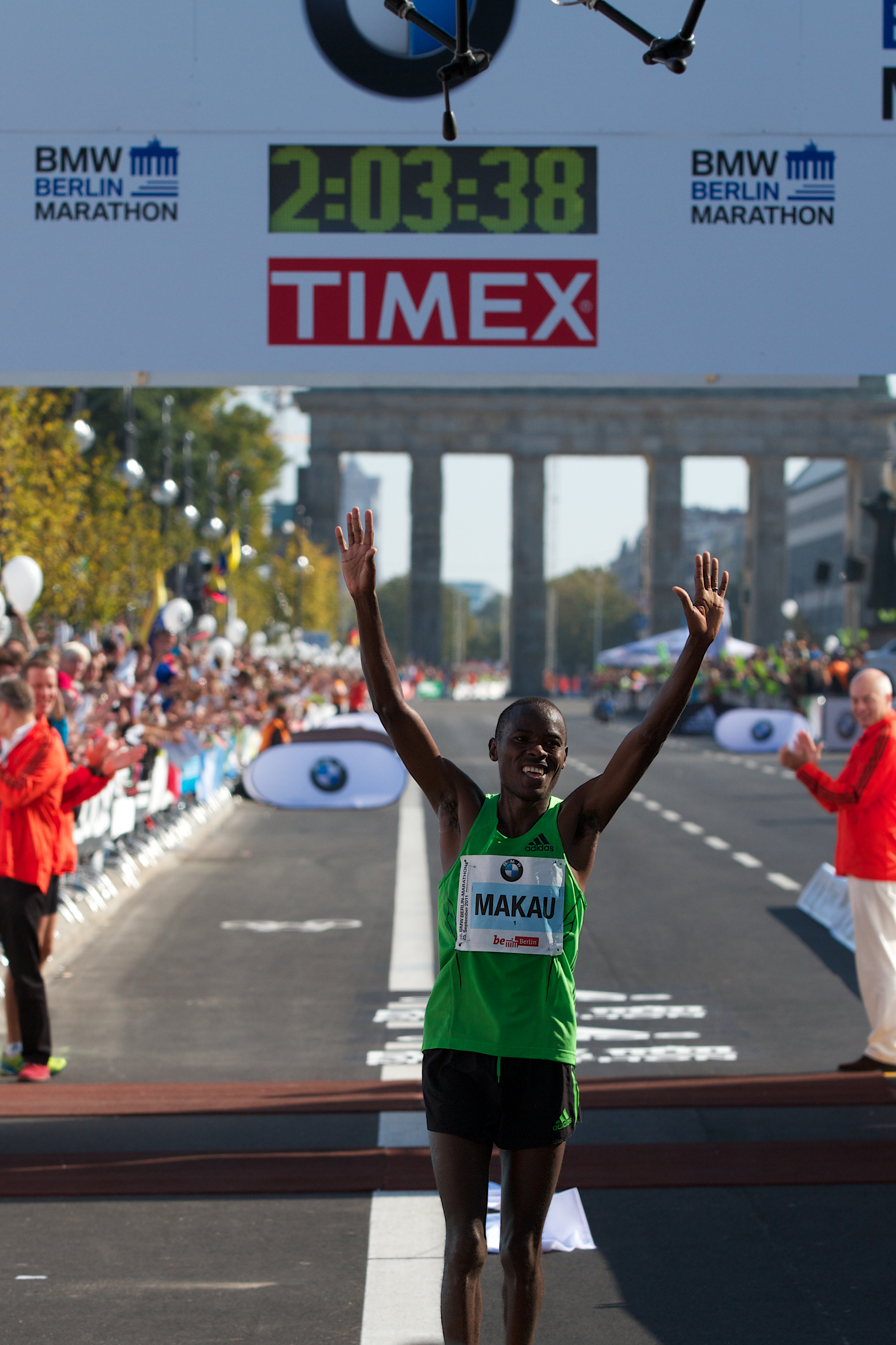
- Patrick Makau setting the previous World Record at the Berlin Marathon 2011

Personal information
- Born: 2 March 1985 (age 41) Tala, Machakos, Kenya

Sport
- Country: Kenya
- Club: Kenya national athletics team
Medal record
Men's athletics
IAAF World Half Marathon Championships
Gold medal – first place	2007 Udine	Team
Gold medal – first place	2008 Rio de Janeiro	Team
Silver medal – second place	2007 Udine	Individual
Silver medal – second place	2008 Rio de Janeiro	Individual

Patrick Makau Musyoki (born 2 March 1985) is a runner from Kenya. He is a former world record holder in the marathon—His time of 2:03:38, run at the 2011 Berlin Marathon, was the world record for two years, until it was beaten by Wilson Kipsang Kiprotich at the 2013 Berlin Marathon. He is also notable for his half marathon performances, having won a number of prominent competitions in Europe in sub-1-hour performances.

== Career ==
Makau attended Unyuani School until 1999, after which he joined Kyeni Academy, Misiani. He started running in 2001. He competed at the 2006 IAAF World Road Running Championships and finished in 26th place.

He finished second at the 2007 Ras Al Khaimah Half Marathon by running 59:13 minutes, being beaten only by Samuel Wanjiru who set the world record (58:53) at the same race. He won silver at the 2007 IAAF World Road Running Championships and 2008 IAAF World Half Marathon Championships. He was also part of the Kenyan team that won the team race both times.

He won at the City-Pier-City Loop in 2008. Makau won the 2009 Ras Al Khaimah Half Marathon setting the second best ever half marathon time 58:52. The world record at the time, 58:33, was held by Samuel Wanjiru. He made his marathon debut at the 2009 Rotterdam Marathon, finishing fourth and setting a fast time (2:06:14 hours), short of the fastest marathon debut, set by Evans Rutto at the 2003 Chicago Marathon (2:05:50 hours).

Makau returned to the Hague for the City-Pier-City Loop in 2010 and won for a second time, clocking another sub-one hour time of 59:52. After this he significantly improved his marathon best to 2:04:48 to win the Rotterdam Marathon, becoming the fourth fastest runner over the history of the distance. He opted to stay away from the circuit and focus himself entirely on preparations for the Berlin Marathon. A rematch with Rotterdam runner-up Geoffrey Mutai saw the two take the same positions again. Rain dampened the prospect of a record but Makau out-sprinted Mutai at the finish to clock 2:05:08 and win his first World Marathon Major. In recognition of his performances that year, he was selected as the AIMS World Athlete of the Year in a poll of race organisers.

Makau ran in the 2011 London Marathon and, in spite of a fall at the halfway point, he continued and was narrowly beaten into third at the line by Martin Lel, finishing with a time of 2:05:45.

=== World record ===
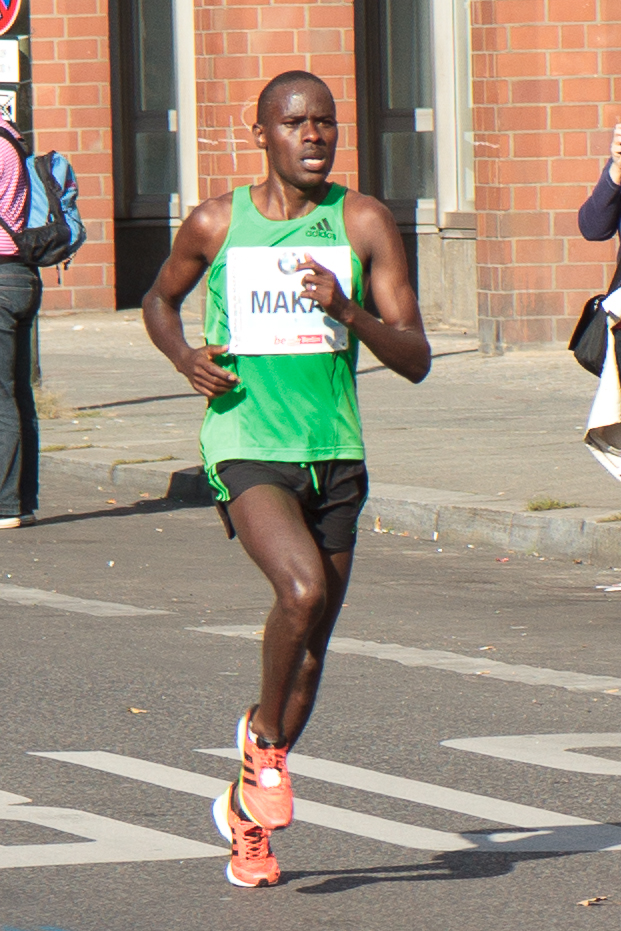
Patrick Makau Musyoki running world record at Berlin Marathon 2011

At the Berlin Marathon on 25 September 2011, Makau was set to duel against Haile Gebrselassie, the world record holder from Ethiopia. The Kenyan dropped his more experienced rival after the halfway point and went on to finish in a world record time of 2:03:38 (an average pace of 4:42.9 per mile), beating the existing record by 21 seconds. Prior to the race, he stated that he wanted to bring the marathon world record back to Kenya, following on from a former record holder Paul Tergat. Speaking after the race, Makau said "In the morning my body was not good but after I started the race, it started reacting very well. I started thinking about the record" and "At 32 km I thought I could win the race and even break the world record. It was hard [over] the last 10 kilometres". His world record performance remained for 2 years before falling to fellow Kenyan, Wilson Kipsang Kiprotich, at the 2013 Berlin Marathon, when the record was lowered another 15 seconds to the time of 2:03:23.

=== 2012 season ===
He was the pre-race favourite for the Granollers Half Marathon in February, but lost in a sprint finish to Carles Castillejo under cold weather conditions. He ran at the 2012 London Marathon but dropped out mid-race due to injury and was not selected for the Olympic team. He entered the Great Manchester Run in May and came fifth in a time of 28:21 minutes. In the Frankfurt Marathon in October, despite feeling uncomfortable and running most of the time at the back of the leading group, Makau managed to take back the lead from Deressa Chimsa and holding on for the victory, with a time of 2:06:08.

=== 2013 season ===
Makau raced in the 2013 London Marathon. He showed to be in poor form, having been outside the lead pack already by the first time point at 5 km, falling farther and farther behind with every time point until 40 km. By halfway, he was nearly 3 minutes behind the leaders, but he slowed further and eventually finished the race in 2:14:10, outside the top 10, more than 8 minutes back from the winner, and more than 10 minutes back from his own world record.

== Road race wins ==
10K

- London 10K – 2006
- Lahore 10K – 2007
- Vidovdan Road Race Brcko BH 10K – 2007

Half marathon & 25K

- Zanzibar Half Marathon – 2005
- Tarsus International Half Marathon – 2006
- Bristol Half Marathon – 2006
- BIG 25 Berlin – 2006, 2007
- Berlin Half Marathon – 2007, 2008
- Ras Al Khaimah Half Marathon – 2008, 2009
- Reading Half Marathon – 2008
- City-Pier-City Loop – 2008, 2010
- Rotterdam Half Marathon – 2008

Marathons

- Rotterdam Marathon – 2010
- Berlin Marathon – 2010, 2011
- Frankfurt Marathon – 2012
- Fukuoka Marathon – 2014, 2015

== Achievements ==
- All results regarding marathon and half marathon

Year	Competition	Venue	Position	Notes
Representing Kenya
2005	Zanzibar Half Marathon	Zanzibar City	1st	1:04:12
2006	Bristol Half Marathon	Bristol, United Kingdom	1st	1:03:38
2006	Tarsus International Half Marathon	Tarsus, Mersin	1st	1:02:42
2007	Ras Al Khaimah Half Marathon	Ras al-Khaimah	2nd	59:13
2007	Rotterdam Half Marathon	Rotterdam, Netherlands	2nd	59:19
2007	Udine Half Marathon	Udine, Italy	2nd	59:02
2007	Berlin Half Marathon	Berlin, Germany	1st	58:56
2008	Reading Half Marathon	Reading, United Kingdom	1st	1:01:19
2008	Berlin Half Marathon	Berlin, Germany	1st	1:00:00
2008	CPC Loop Den Haag	The Hague, Netherlands	1st	1:00:08
2008	Rotterdam Half Marathon	Rotterdam, Netherlands	1st	59:29
2008	Ras Al Khaimah Half Marathon	Ras al-Khaimah	1st	59:35
2009	Rotterdam Marathon	Rotterdam, Netherlands	4th	2:06:14
2009	Ras Al Khaimah Half Marathon	Ras al-Khaimah	1st	58:52
2010	CPC Loop Den Haag	The Hague, Netherlands	1st	59:52
2010	Rotterdam Marathon	Rotterdam, Netherlands	1st	2:04:48
2010	Berlin Marathon	Berlin, Germany	1st	2:05:08
2011	London Marathon	London, United Kingdom	3rd	2:05:45
2011	Berlin Marathon	Berlin, Germany	1st	2:03:38 WR
2012	Granollers Half Marathon	Catalonia, Spain	2nd	1:02:40
2012	Frankfurt Marathon	Frankfurt, Germany	1st	2:06:08
2013	London Marathon	London, United Kingdom	11th	2:14:10
2014	Fukuoka Marathon	Fukuoka, Japan	1st	2:08:22
2015	Fukuoka Marathon	Fukuoka, Japan	1st	2:08:18
2016	Fukuoka Marathon	Fukuoka, Japan	2nd	2:08:57

== Personal bests ==
Surface	Event	Time (h:m:s)	Venue	Date
Track	3000 m	7:54.50	Pliezhausen, Germany	13 May 2007
Road
Road	10 km	27:27	Berlin, Germany	1 April 2007
Road	15 km	41:30	Ras Al Khaimah, UAE	20 February 2009
Road	20 km	56:13	Udine, Italy	14 October 2007
Road	Half marathon	58:52	Ras Al Khaimah, UAE	20 February 2009
Road	25 km	1:13:18	Berlin, Germany	25 September 2011
Road	30 km	1:27:38	Berlin, Germany	25 September 2011
Road	Marathon	2:03:38	Berlin, Germany	25 September 2011

- All information taken from IAAF profile, including the 2011 marathon record

Records
Preceded by (Ethiopia) Haile Gebrselassie	Men's Marathon World Record Holder; 25 September 2011 – 29 September 2013	Succeeded by (Kenya) Wilson Kipsang Kiprotich
Sporting positions
Preceded by Haile Gebrselassie; Deriba Merga	Men's Half Marathon Best Year Performance; 2009	Succeeded by Zersenay Tadese
