= 2007 IAAF World Road Running Championships =

- Host city: Udine, Friuli-Venezia Giulia, Italy
- Nations: 37
- Athletes: 144
- Events: 2
- Dates: 2007-10-14
- Race length: 21.097 kilometres (half marathon)
- Individual prize money (US$): 1st: 30,000; 2nd: 15,000; 3rd: 10,000; 4th: 7,000; 5th: 5,000; 6th: 3,000
- Team prize money (US$): 1st: 15,000; 2nd: 12,000; 3rd: 9,000; 4th: 7,500; 5th: 6,000; 6th: 3,000

The 2007 IAAF World Road Running Championships were held in Udine, Italy on 14 October 2007. Detailed reports on the event and an appraisal of the results were given for both the men's and the women's individual and team races.

== Medallists ==
Event	Gold		Silver		Bronze	
Individual
Men	Zersenay Tadesse (ERI)	58:59	Patrick Makau Musyoki (KEN)	59:02	Evans Kiprop Cheruiyot (KEN)	59:05
Women	Lornah Kiplagat (NED)	1:06:25	Mary Jepkosgei Keitany (KEN)	1:06:48	Pamela Chepchumba (KEN)	1:08:06
Team
Team Men	Kenya	2:58:54	Eritrea	2:59:08	Ethiopia	3:01:15
Team Women	Kenya	3:23:33	Ethiopia	3:25:51	Japan	3:27:39

== Race results ==
Complete results were published for the men's race, the women's race, the men's team, and the women's team.

=== Men's ===
Rank	Athlete	Nationality	Time	Notes
1st place, gold medalist(s)	Zersenay Tadesse	Eritrea	58:59	CR
2nd place, silver medalist(s)	Patrick Makau Musyoki	Kenya	59:02	
3rd place, bronze medalist(s)	Evans Kiprop Cheruiyot	Kenya	59:05	PB
4	Deriba Merga	Ethiopia	59:16	PB
5	Yonas Kifle	Eritrea	59:30	PB
6	Dieudonné Disi	Rwanda	59:32	NR
7	Marilson dos Santos	Brazil	59:33	AR
8	Dickson Marwa	Tanzania	1:00:24	PB
9	Atsushi Sato	Japan	1:00:25	AR
10	Cuthbert Nyasango	Zimbabwe	1:00:26	NR
11	Fabiano Joseph	Tanzania	1:00:27	
12	Raji Assefa	Ethiopia	1:00:31	PB
13	Michael Tesfay	Eritrea	1:00:39	PB
14	Ali Dawoud Sedam	Qatar	1:00:39	NR
15	Robert Kipkorir Kipchumba	Kenya	1:00:47	SB
16	Samson Kiflemariam	Eritrea	1:00:52	PB
17	Nicolas Kiprono	Uganda	1:00:57	NR
18	Tariku Jufar	Ethiopia	1:01:28	PB
19	Ezekiel Ngimba	Tanzania	1:01:28	PB
20	Pierre Joncheray	France	1:01:36	PB
21	Mohammed Abduh Bakhet	Qatar	1:01:38	
22	Kidane Gemechu	Ethiopia	1:01:38	PB
23	Günther Weidlinger	Austria	1:01:42	NR
24	Ahmed Hassan Abdullah	Qatar	1:01:46	PB
25	Samwel Kwaangu Shauri	Tanzania	1:01:58	PB
26	Sylvain Rukundo	Rwanda	1:01:59	PB
27	Wilson Busienei	Uganda	1:02:05	
28	James Kibet	Uganda	1:02:07	PB
29	Ahmed Jumaa Jaber	Qatar	1:02:08	PB
30	Kazuhiro Maeda	Japan	1:02:08	PB
31	Ricardo Serrano	Spain	1:02:09	PB
32	Ruggero Pertile	Italy	1:02:17	PB
33	Kenji Noguchi	Japan	1:02:20	PB
34	Lusapho April	South Africa	1:02:24	SB
35	Fernando Rey	Spain	1:02:26	PB
36	Tewoldebrhan Mengisteab	Eritrea	1:02:36	
37	Nkosinoxolo Sonqibido	South Africa	1:02:36	PB
38	Gervais Hakizimana	Rwanda	1:02:43	PB
39	Clodoaldo da Silva	Brazil	1:02:50	PB
40	João de Lima	Brazil	1:02:51	PB
41	Daniele Caimmi	Italy	1:02:57	SB
42	Juan Carlos Romero	Mexico	1:03:20	PB
43	Isaac Kiprop	Uganda	1:03:20	
44	Keenetse Moswasi	Botswana	1:03:21	PB
45	Francis Larabal	Kenya	1:03:22	
46	Yevgeniy Rybakov	Russia	1:03:22	
47	Anatoliy Rybakov	Russia	1:03:23	PB
48	Jussi Utriainen	Finland	1:03:24	PB
49	Giovanni Ruggiero	Italy	1:03:25	SB
50	Jesse Stroobants	Belgium	1:03:29	
51	Samuel Wanjiru	Kenya	1:03:31	
52	Olebogeng Masire	South Africa	1:03:32	PB
53	Moustafa Ahmed Shebto	Qatar	1:03:33	
54	Tetsuo Nishimura	Japan	1:03:41	
55	Aguelmis Rojas	Cuba	1:03:48	
56	Ottaviano Andriani	Italy	1:03:54	SB
57	Thabiso Moeng	South Africa	1:04:02	PB
58	Eshetu Gezhagne	Ethiopia	1:04:04	
59	Diego Colorado	Colombia	1:04:18	SB
60	Sergey Yemelyanov	Russia	1:04:30	
61	Martin Pröll	Austria	1:04:32	PB
62	Giomar da Silva	Brazil	1:04:34	
63	José de Souza	Brazil	1:04:35	SB
64	Francisco Bautista	Mexico	1:04:40	PB
65	Markus Hohenwarter	Austria	1:04:45	PB
66	Jan Simons	South Africa	1:05:38	
67	Ernesto Zamora	Uruguay	1:06:00	PB
68	Giovanny Amador	Colombia	1:06:07	PB
69	Christian Pflügl	Austria	1:06:26	PB
70	Julio Rey	Spain	1:06:29	
71	Kaelo Mosalagae	Botswana	1:06:57	SB
72	Edwin Romero	Colombia	1:08:00	PB
73	Kabo Gabaseme	Botswana	1:08:22	SB
74	Robert Lugo	Venezuela	1:08:22	
75	Richard Jones	Trinidad and Tobago	1:10:17	
76	Christophe Yahiri	Ivory Coast	1:11:23	
77	Perhat Annagylyjov	Turkmenistan	1:13:24	
78	Curtis Cox	Trinidad and Tobago	1:14:51	PB
79	Jules La Rode	Trinidad and Tobago	1:14:52	PB
—	Mokhtar Benhari	France	DNF	
—	Denis Curzi	Italy	DNF	
—	Jean-Marie Kouakou	Ivory Coast	DNF	
—	José Francisco Chaves	Costa Rica	DNS	
—	Mahmoud Abuattaya	Palestine	DNS	
—	Abdinasir Said Ibrahim	Somalia	DNS	

=== Women's ===
Rank	Athlete	Nationality	Time	Notes
1st place, gold medalist(s)	Lornah Kiplagat	Netherlands	1:06:25	WR
2nd place, silver medalist(s)	Mary Jepkosgei Keitany	Kenya	1:06:48	NR
3rd place, bronze medalist(s)	Pamela Chepchumba	Kenya	1:08:06	PB
4	Bezunesh Bekele	Ethiopia	1:08:07	NR
5	Atsede Habtamu	Ethiopia	1:08:29	
6	Everline Kimwei	Kenya	1:08:39	PB
7	Chisato Osaki	Japan	1:08:56	PB
8	Luminița Talpoș	Romania	1:09:01	PB
9	Alice Timbilil	Kenya	1:09:09	
10	Alina Tecuţă/Gherasim	Romania	1:09:14	SB
11	Atsede Baysa	Ethiopia	1:09:15	PB
12	Akane Taira	Japan	1:09:17	PB
13	Yoshimi Ozaki	Japan	1:09:26	PB
14	Irina Timofeyeva	Russia	1:09:29	PB
15	Alina Ivanova	Russia	1:09:32	PB
16	Deena Kastor	United States	1:09:38	
17	Olga Glok	Russia	1:09:58	PB
18	Lidia Șimon	Romania	1:10:08	SB
19	Genet Getaneh	Ethiopia	1:10:30	
20	Krisztina Papp	Hungary	1:10:53	PB
21	Furtuna Zegergish	Eritrea	1:11:03	NR
22	Christelle Daunay	France	1:11:05	PB
23	Anna Incerti	Italy	1:11:09	SB
24	Vincenza Sicari	Italy	1:11:12	PB
25	Liliya Shobukhova	Russia	1:11:35	
26	Yuko Machida	Japan	1:11:55	SB
27	Katie McGregor	United States	1:12:01	
28	Daniela Cârlan	Romania	1:12:14	
29	Selma Borst	Netherlands	1:12:41	SB
30	Claudia Pinna	Italy	1:12:44	PB
31	Angeline Nyiransabimana	Rwanda	1:12:44	NR
32	Tara Storage	United States	1:12:47	PB
33	Lisa Weightman	Australia	1:12:53	
34	Desireé Davila	United States	1:12:54	
35	Karina Pérez	Mexico	1:12:55	PB
36	Luciah Kimani	Bosnia and Herzegovina	1:12:55	NR
37	Paula Todoran	Romania	1:12:59	
38	Renate Rungger	Italy	1:13:10	
39	Yurika Nakamura	Japan	1:13:13	
40	Michelle Ross-Cope	Great Britain	1:13:45	
41	Ednalva da Silva	Brazil	1:14:23	
42	Bertha Sánchez	Colombia	1:14:40	SB
43	Anke Van Campen	Belgium	1:14:40	PB
44	Petra Kamínková/Drajzajtlová	Czech Republic	1:14:47	
45	Paula Apolonio	Mexico	1:15:00	PB
46	Magdaliní Gazéa	Greece	1:15:17	PB
47	Carmen Oliveras	France	1:15:27	
48	Lucélia Peres	Brazil	1:15:39	
49	Wendy Nicholls/Jones	Great Britain	1:16:54	
50	Épiphanie Nyirabaramé	Rwanda	1:17:14	PB
51	Norelys Lugo	Venezuela	1:17:48	
52	Martha Ronceria	Colombia	1:18:18	
53	Lina Arias	Colombia	1:20:16	
54	Shermin La Saldo	Trinidad and Tobago	1:25:37	NR
55	Marisol Redón	Uruguay	1:26:47	
56	Christine Regis	Trinidad and Tobago	1:28:50	
—	Mariana Carpine	DR Congo	DNF	
—	Louise Damen	Great Britain	DNF	
—	Fatna Maraoui	Italy	DNF	
—	Leyla Dzhumayeva	Turkmenistan	DNF	
—	Alicia Shay	United States	DNF	
—	Susan Chepkemei	Kenya	DQ	^{†}
—	Sandrine Menguee Zambo	Cameroon	DNS	

^{†}: Susan Chepkemei from Kenya did not finish since she tested positive for Salbutamol and was disqualified.

== Team results ==
=== Men's ===
Rank	Country	Team	Time
1st place, gold medalist(s)	Kenya	Patrick Makau Musyoki; Evans Kiprop Cheruiyot; Robert Kipchumba	2:58:54
2nd place, silver medalist(s)	Eritrea	Zersenay Tadesse; Yonas Kifle; Michael Tesfay	2:59:08
3rd place, bronze medalist(s)	Ethiopia	Deriba Merga; Raji Assefa; Tariku Jufar	3:01:15
4	Tanzania	Dickson Marwa; Fabiano Joseph; Ezekiel Ngimba	3:02:19
5	Qatar	Ali Dawoud Sedam; Mohammed Abduh Bakhet; Ahmed Hassan Abdullah	3:04:03
6	Rwanda	Dieudonné Disi; Sylvain Rukundo; Gervais Hakizimana	3:04:14
7	Japan	Atsushi Sato; Kazuhiro Maeda; Kenji Noguchi	3:04:53
8	Uganda	Nicolas Kiprono; Wilson Busienei; James Kibet	3:05:09
9	Brazil	Marilson dos Santos; Clodoaldo da Silva; João de Lima	3:05:14
10	South Africa	Lusapho April; Nkosinoxolo Sonqibido; Olebogeng Masire	3:08:32
11	Italy	Ruggero Pertile; Daniele Caimmi; Giovanni Ruggiero	3:08:39
12	Austria	Günther Weidlinger; Martin Pröll; Markus Hohenwarter	3:10:59
13	Spain	Ricardo Serrano; Fernando Rey; Julio Rey	3:11:04
14	Russia	Yevgeniy Rybakov; Anatoliy Rybakov; Sergey Yemelyanov	3:11:15
15	Colombia	Diego Colorado; Giovanny Amador; Edwin Romero	3:18:25
16	Botswana	Keenetse Moswasi; Kaelo Mosalagae; Kabo Gabaseme	3:18:40
17	Trinidad and Tobago	Richard Jones; Curtis Cox; Jules La Rode	3:40:00

=== Women's ===
Rank	Country	Team	Time
1st place, gold medalist(s)	Kenya	Mary Jepkosgei Keitany; Pamela Chepchumba; Everline Kimwei	3:23:33
2nd place, silver medalist(s)	Ethiopia	Bezunesh Bekele; Atsede Habtamu; Atsede Baysa	3:25:51
3rd place, bronze medalist(s)	Japan	Chisato Osaki; Akane Taira; Yoshimi Ozaki	3:27:39
4	Romania	Luminița Talpoș; Alina Tecuţă/Gherasim; Lidia Șimon	3:28:23
5	Russia	Irina Timofeyeva; Alina Ivanova; Olga Glok	3:28:59
6	United States	Deena Kastor; Katie McGregor; Tara Storage	3:34:26
7	Italy	Anna Incerti; Vincenza Sicari; Claudia Pinna	3:35:05
8	Colombia	Bertha Sánchez; Martha Ronceria; Lina Arias	3:53:14
—	Great Britain	Michelle Ross-Cope; Wendy Nicholls/Jones; Louise Damen	DNF

== Participation ==
The participation of 144 athletes (82 men/62 women) from 37 countries is reported. Although announced, athletes from Cameroon, Costa Rica, Palestine, and Somalia did not show.

- Australia (1)
- Austria (4)
- Belgium (2)
- Bosnia and Herzegovina (1)
- Botswana (3)
- Brazil (7)
- Colombia (6)
- Democratic Republic of the Congo (1)
- Cuba (1)
- Czech Republic (1)
- Eritrea (6)
- Ethiopia (9)
- Finland (1)
- France (4)
- Greece (1)
- Hungary (1)
- Italy (10)
- Ivory Coast (2)
- Japan (9)
- Kenya (10)
- Mexico (4)
- Netherlands (2)
- Qatar (5)
- Romania (5)
- Russia (7)
- Rwanda (5)
- South Africa (5)
- Spain (3)
- Tanzania (4)
- Turkmenistan (2)
- Trinidad and Tobago (5)
- Uganda (4)
- United Kingdom (3)
- United States (5)
- Uruguay (2)
- Venezuela (2)
- Zimbabwe (1)

== See also ==
- 2007 in athletics (track and field)
