= Ümmü Kiraz =

Turkish long-distance runner (born 1982)

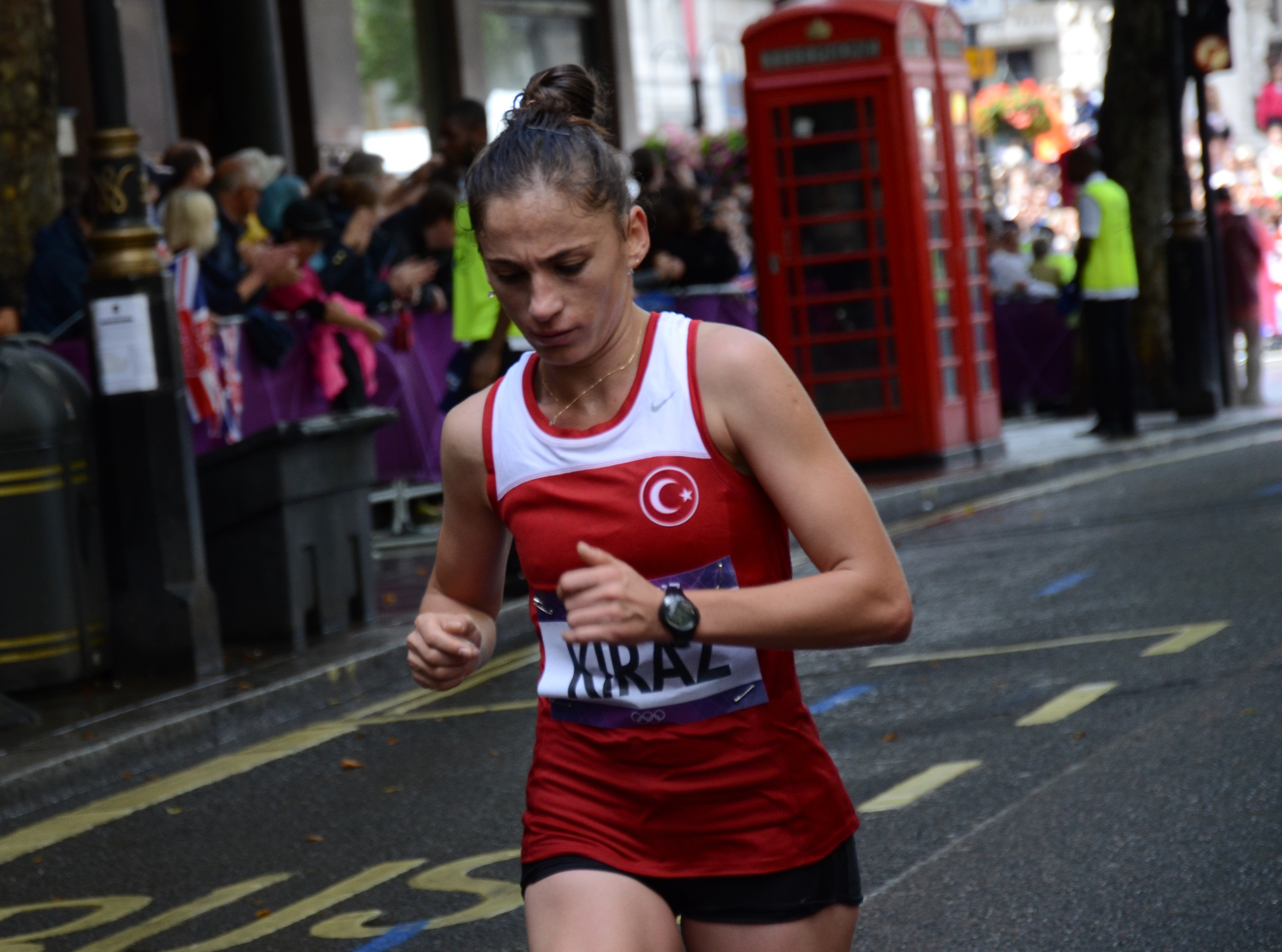
- Ümmü Kiraz in the 2012 Summer Olympics marathon

Personal information
- Nationality: Turkey
- Born: September 27, 1982 (age 44) Acıpayam, Denizli Province, Turkey
- Height: 163 cm (5 ft 4 in)
- Weight: 48 kg (106 lb)

Sport
- Sport: Long-distance
- Club: Kasımpaşaspor, Istanbul
- Coached by: Öznur Hatipoğlu
Medal record
Mediterranean Games
Bronze medal – third place	2013 Mersin	Half marathon

Ümmü Kiraz (born September 27, 1982, in Acıpayam, Denizli Province, Turkey) is a Turkish female long-distance runner, who specializes in the marathon. She was a member of Denizli Belediyespor before she transferred to Kasımpaşaspor in Istanbul, where Kiraz is coached by Öznur Hatipoğlu. The 163 cm (5 ft 4 in) tall athlete at 48 kg (106 lb) is a student of physical education and sports at the Pamukkale University's vocational college.

At the 2012 Adana Half Marathon, Kiraz came second behind Bahar Doğan. She finished the 2012 Tarsus Half Marathon in third place.

Ümmü Kiraz qualified for participation in the marathon event at the 2012 Olympics in London, where she finished in 89th place.

In half marathon event of 2013 Mediterranean Games in Mersin, she finished at the third place (1:16:51)

In 2015 she was banned for 2 1/2 years for 2011 biological passport irregularities.

== Personal bests ==
According to All-Athletics and IAAF records, her best times as of April 2015 are:

- 1500 m 4:44.85 - Ankara (TUR), 20.05.2006
- 3000 m 10:28.48 - Ankara (TUR), 21.05.2006
- 10,000 m 33:10.85 - Skopje (MKD), 07.06.2014
- 15 km road 54:42 - Istanbul (TUR), 28.10.2007
- Half marathon 1:12:19 - Tarsus, Mersin (TUR), 25.03.2012
- Marathon 2:32:52 - Istanbul (TUR), 16.11.2014
