= Øyvind Dahl =

Norwegian long-distance runner

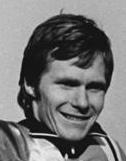
Øyvind Dahl in 1980

Øyvind Dahl (born 12 May 1951, in Oslo) is a retired Norwegian long-distance runner. He represented IL i BUL. At the European Championships he finished fifteenth in 10,000 metres in 1978 and ninth in marathon in 1982. He also competed at the 1983 World Championships and the 1984 Summer Olympics as well as the World Cross Country Championships in 1979, 1980 and 1983 without success. He became Norwegian champion in 10,000 m in 1981.

He won the City-Pier-City Loop half marathon in the Hague three times (1979–1981).

== Personal bests ==
- 5000 metres - 13:34.9 min (1978) - eleventh among Norwegian 5000 m runners.
- 10,000 metres - 28:32.5 min (1978) - twelfth among Norwegian 10,000 m runners.
- Half marathon - 1:02:46 min (1980) - third among Norwegian marathon runners, only behind Geir Kvernmo and Roy Andersen.
- Marathon - 2:11:40 min (1980) - third among Norwegian marathon runners, only behind Geir Kvernmo and Stig Roar Husby.

== Achievements ==
Year	Competition	Venue	Position	Event	Notes
Representing Norway
1979	City-Pier-City Loop	The Hague, Netherlands	1st	Half Marathon	1:03:07
1980	City-Pier-City Loop	The Hague, Netherlands	1st	Half Marathon	1:02:46
1981	City-Pier-City Loop	The Hague, Netherlands	1st	Half Marathon	1:04:18
1981	New York City Marathon	New York, United States	18th	Marathon	2:14:40
1982	Tokyo Marathon	Tokyo, Japan	10th	Marathon	2:14:00
1982	London Marathon	London, United Kingdom	2nd	Marathon	2:12:21
1982	European Championships	Athens, Greece	9th	Marathon	2:19:49
1983	World Championships	Helsinki, Finland	26th	Marathon	2:16:02
1984	Olympic Games	Los Angeles, United States	33rd	Marathon	2:19:28
1984	Great North Run	Newcastle, England	1st	Half Marathon	1:04:36
