= Rotterdam Half Marathon =

Road running event in Rotterdam, Netherlands

The Rotterdam Half Marathon was an annual half marathon race over 21.1 kilometres, that was staged in Rotterdam, the Netherlands on the second Sunday in September. The event was contested from 2004 to 2009. It was discontinued in 2010 due to lacking participation.

In 2022, the race returned co-inciding with the World Police and Fire Games that were held in Rotterdam that year. The municipality of Rotterdam did not grant an event permit for an edition in 2023.

== Winners ==
| Year | Men's Winner | Time (h:m:s) | Women's Winner | Time (h:m:s) |
|---|---|---|---|---|
| September 12, 2004 | Robert Cheruiyot (KEN) | 1:00:11 | Lydia Cheromei (KEN) | 1:09:13 |
| September 11, 2005 | Samuel Kamau Wanjiru (KEN) | 59:16 WR | Bezunesh Bekele (ETH) | 1:11:56 |
| September 10, 2006 | Zersenay Tadese (ERI) | 59:16 | Mara Yamauchi (GBR) | 1:10:38 |
| September 9, 2007 | Evans Cheruiyot (KEN) | 59:13 CR | Berhane Adere (ETH) | 1:11:11 |
| September 14, 2008 | Patrick Makau (KEN) | 59:29 | Lydia Cheromei (KEN) | 1:08:35 CR |
| September 14, 2009 | Sammy Kitwara (KEN) | 58:58 CR | Merel de Knegt (NED) | 1:14:31 |
| July 31, 2022 | Roy Hoornweg (NED) | 1:06:56 | Monique Vonlanthen (SUI) | 1:18:12 |

== See also ==
- Rotterdam Marathon
- Egmond Half Marathon
