= Sammy Kitwara =

Kenyan long-distance runner (born 1986)

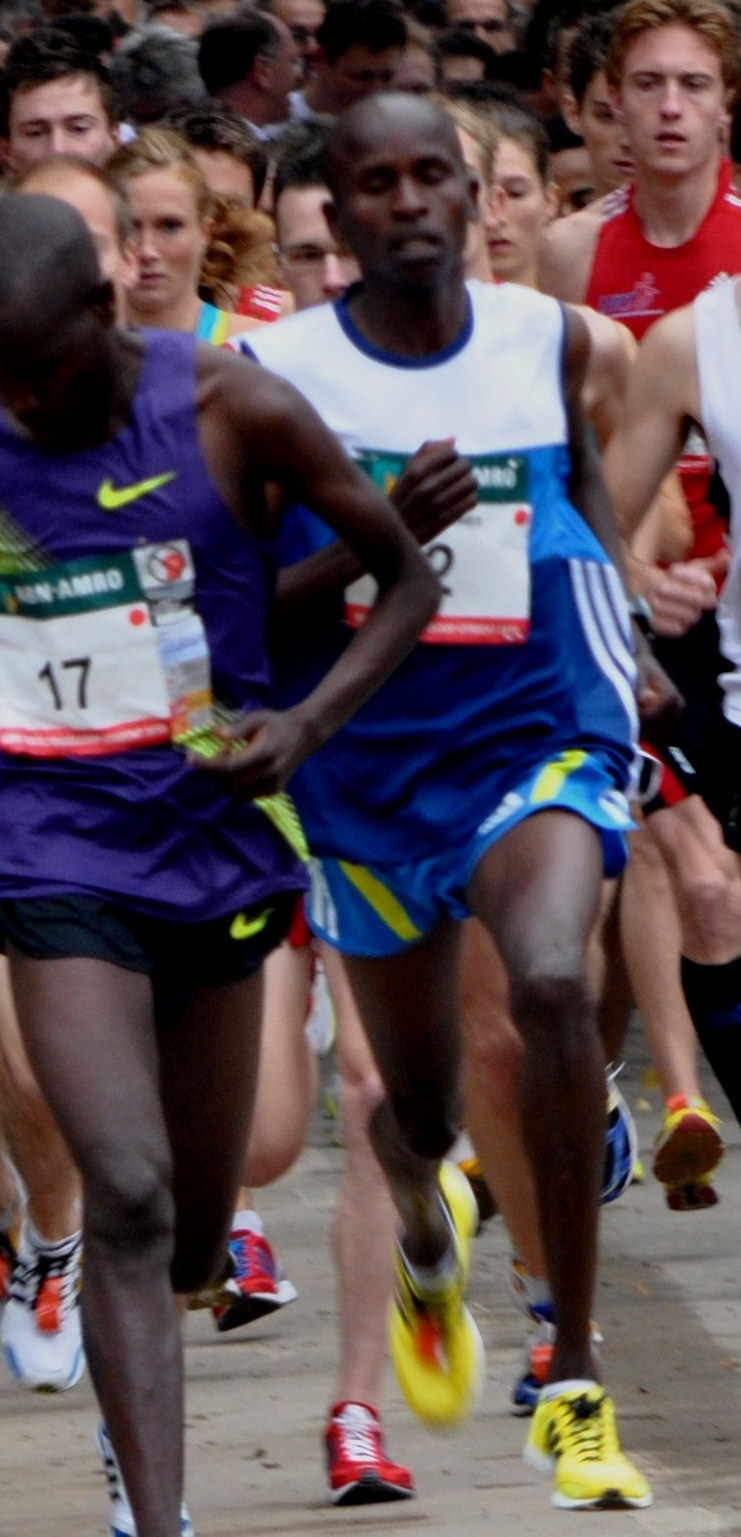
Kitwara behind Boniface Kirui at the Singelloop Utrecht in 2011

Sammy Kirop Kitwara (born 26 November 1986 in Sagat, Marakwet District) is a Kenyan long-distance runner who specialises in road running events. He is coached by Moses Kiptanui. As of November 2023 he is the 33rd fastest half marathon runner in history, having run 58.48 in 2011, which was the 4th fastest ever at the time.

== Biography ==
He went to Embomir Primary School and Kerio Valley Secondary school, from which he graduated in 2004. He did not take up running until 2007, later quoting "I saw I was not making any progress in life and my family needed assistance". Kitwara won four national cross-country circuit competitions in 2008, but failed at the trials for the cross-country world championships. In 2008 he took to the European road running circuit and won at the 20 Kilomètres de Paris, Dam tot Damloop and Singelloop Utrecht races.

Kitwara, a policeman by occupation, won the 2009 Rotterdam Half Marathon in a time of 58:58 – a course record which made him only the sixth runner to complete a sub-59-minute run. Earlier in the year Kitwara won another major half marathon, the City-Pier-City half marathon in The Hague, beating Haile Gebrselassie into second place, as well as winning at the Peachtree Road Race. He set a new course record of 27:25.6 at the World's Best 10K in February that year. Kitwara won the 10,000 m race at the Kenyan Trials in June 2009, earning a place in the national team for the 2009 World Championships in Berlin. However, he was subsequently removed from the team by Athletics Kenya for participating in road races after the Trials. He did, however compete at the 2009 IAAF World Half Marathon Championships in Birmingham, finishing 10th.

He began 2010 with two second-place finishes: finishing just behind Tilahun Regassa at the Abu Dhabi Half Marathon, and recording 59:47 minutes for second at the Lisbon Half Marathon behind a world record-beating Zersenay Tadese.

Kitwara is a three-time champion of the Bay to Breakers and the course record holder in that event. In 2009, race organizers reported that his 33:31 was the fastest 12 km ever run. (Note: Although Bay to Breakers race organizers reported that this was the fastest 12 km ever run, the International Association of Athletics Federations does not recognise world records or world bests in either an indoor or outdoor 12 km. Although the Association of Road Racing Statisticians does recognise a world record in the outdoor 12 km, their record keeping rules state: "A record quality course is defined as having not more than 1 m/km net drop between the start and finish and not more than 30% of the race distance separation between that start and finish, e.g. not more than a 3 km separation for a 10 km race [or 3.6 km for a 12 km race]. Records will only be accepted for record quality courses." The Bay to Breakers course does not qualify at a "record quality course" per ARRS standards as the start and finish of the event are approximately 10.5 linear kilometres apart. According to the Association of Road Racing Statisticians, Joseph Kimani of Kenya also ran a 33:31 at the Arts Fest River Run in Evansville, Indiana in 1997; however, Simon Kigen of Kenya holds the 12 km world record with a 33:46 performance in Portland, Oregon in 1985.) In 2010, he edged out fellow Kenyan Peter Kirui by less than a second for the victory in 34:15. He ran a personal best for the 10K at the Utrecht Singelloop in September 2010, finishing as runner-up with a time of 27:11 minutes. This elevated him into the top eight of all time, although race winner Leonard Komon overshadowed this achievement by breaking the world record by a large margin.

Kitwara took his second win at the World's Best 10K in February 2011, becoming one of three men (including Hendrick Ramaala and John Korir) to have won twice in Puerto Rico. He was out-stripped at the City-Pier-City race in March, however, as he came fifth while Lelisa Desisa (whom he had beaten in Puerto Rico) won the race. He won his second title at the Peachtree Road Race in July that year. Later that year he ran a 58:48-minute personal best for second place at the Philadelphia Half Marathon, making him the fourth fastest runner ever for the distance. He did not reach the same form in November, when he came fourth at the Delhi Half Marathon.

He opened 2012 with another win at the World's Best 10K, completing the course in 28:02 minutes. He attempted a marathon debut at the Rotterdam Marathon (where he has acted as pacemaker before), but did not finish as he dropped out after 30 km. In October, he was placed fourth at the 2012 Chicago Marathon with a time of 2:05:54 hours. He won his third straight World's Best 10K title at the beginning of 2013. A return to the Rotterdam Marathon saw him complete the distance, although his time of 2:07:22 hours was slower than his last.

At the 2015 London Marathon he came 6th in 2.07.43.

Kitwara won the 2016 Lisbon half marathon in 59.47 some way off his personal best.

== Performances ==
- 2008 Nike Hilversum City Run – 1st
- 2008 Humarathon (half marathon) – 1st
- 2008 Rabat Half Marathon – 1st
- 2008 Paris 20K – 1st
- 2008 Dam tot Damloop (10 Miles) -1st
- 2009 City-Pier-City Loop (half marathon) – 1st
- 2009 Peachtree Road Race (10K) – 1st
- 2009 Bay to Breakers (12K) – 1st
- 2009 Rotterdam Half Marathon – 1st
- 2009 IAAF World Half Marathon Championships – 10th
- 2010 Abu Dhabi Half Marathon – 2nd
- 2010 Bay to Breakers (12K) – 1st
- 2011 World's Best 10k – 1st
- 2012 World's Best 10k – 1st
- 2012 Bay to Breakers (Men's 12K) – 1st
- 2012 Chicago Marathon (marathon) – 4th
- 2013 World's Best 10k – 1st
- 2016 Lisbon Half Marathon – 1st
- 2017 Marathon Valencia Trinidad Alfonso EDP - 1st
- 2024 Marrakech Marathon - 1st

== Notes ==
Sporting positions
Preceded by (Eritrea) Zersenay Tadese	Men's Dam tot Damloop Winner; 2008	Succeeded by (Kenya) Moses Masai
Preceded by (Kenya) Patrick Makau	Rotterdam Men's Half Marathon Winner; 2009	Succeeded by Event discontinued
