= Tarsus Half Marathon =

Annual Turkish sport event

- Date: March
- Location: Tarsus
- Event type: Road
- Distance: Half marathon
- Established: 2004; 22 years ago

The Tarsus Half Marathon (Turkish: Tarsus Yarı Maratonu) is an annual road running event over the half marathon distance, which is held in March in Tarsus in Mersin Province Turkey.

The 2012 edition attracted 1,200 competitors from 16 countries. The elite level competition attracts top level international runners as well as national level runners. The event also features a shorter 5-kilometre race for fun runners.

The route celebrates the historic roads of Tarsus, which were built and used by the Romans around 500-600 A.D.

== Past winners ==
Key: Course record

Edition	Year	Men's winner	Time (h:m:s)	Women's winner	Time (h:m:s)
1st	2004	John Kipyator (KEN)	1:06:57	Yelena Burykina (RUS)	1:15:18
2nd	2005	Iaroslav Mușinschi (MDA)	1:04:30	Adanech Adane (ETH)	1:12:35
3rd	2006	Patrick Musyoki (KEN)	1:02:42	Letay Negash (ETH)	1:12:03
4th	2007	Wilson Kiprotich (KEN)	1:02:05	Luminița Talpoș (ROM)	1:12:29
5th	2008	Wilson Kiprotich (KEN)	1:02:50	Damla Yenigelen (TUR)	1:23:13
No	2009	Sentayehu Merga (ETH)	1:04:27	Atsede Baysa (ETH)	1:11:37
6th	2010	Mehmet Çağlayan (TUR)	1:03:05	Layes Abdullayeva (AZE)	1:13:08
7th	2011	Sentayehu Merga (ETH)	1:04:27	Atsede Baysa (ETH)	1:11:37
8th	2012	Gebretsadik Abraha (ETH)	1:02:19	Atsede Baysa (ETH)	1:09:39
9th	2013	Moses Too (KEN)	1:03:56	Ümmü Kiraz (TUR)	1:12:56
10th	2014	Bernard Cheruiyot (KEN)	1:03:20	Zinash Hayile (ETH)	1:12:26
11th	2015	Evans Kiplagat (KEN)	1:02:15	Purity Changwony (KEN)	1:11:35
—	2016	cancelled due to security concerns			
—	2017	Not held			
