= Dave Long (runner) =

David Long (born 21 November 1960 in Coventry) is a former long-distance runner from Great Britain. His personal best in the marathon is 2:10:30, achieved when finishing fourth in the 1991 London Marathon.

He represented Great Britain in the men's marathon at the 1988 Summer Olympics in Seoul, South Korea, finishing in 21st position with a time of 2:16:18. Four years later at the 1992 Summer Olympics in Barcelona, Spain he finished in 39th place (2:20.51) in the men's race.

On the circuit, he won the 20 km of Brussels in 1992 – being the first Briton to do so. He was also the 1989 winner of the Dam tot Damloop and the 1990 winner of the Granollers Half Marathon.

== International competitions ==
Year	Competition	Venue	Position	Event	Notes
Representing Great Britain
1988	Olympic Games	Seoul, South Korea	21st	Marathon	2:16:18
1992	Olympic Games	Barcelona, Spain	39th	Marathon	2:20:51
