= Granollers Half Marathon =

- Date: February
- Location: Granollers, Catalonia
- Event type: Road
- Distance: Marathon
- Established: 1981
- Course records: Men: 59:26 (Kenya) Samuel Wanjiru (2008); Women: 1:10:24 (Ethiopia) Gete Wami (2006)
- Website: Granollers Half Marathon
- Participants: 3,819 (2020)

The Granollers Half Marathon (Catalan: Mitja Marató de Granollers) is an annual road running competition over the half marathon distance (21.097 km) which takes place in February in the city of Granollers in Catalonia, Spain.

The race is organised by the Col·lectiu d'Atletes de Fons group and was first held in 1987. The course starts and finishes in Granollers and passes through Les Franqueses del Vallès and La Garriga. It is among the more popular half marathon events in Spain with around 10,000 runners taking part in the day's events.. In addition to the main half marathon race, there are two further events: a 5 km race for fun runners and "the mini", which hosts a range of short distances for children.

In its early editions the race attracted a principally Spanish audience. The first African winner was Ezequiel Bitok in 1993 and his course record run of 1:01:48 hours marked the introduction of elite-level participation at the event. Alberto Juzdado became the first Spaniard to complete the course in under one hour and two minutes in 1998. In 2000, Esther Kiplagat of Kenya was the first foreign female to win at the event and she improved the course record by over two minutes. Two consecutive wins by marathon world record holder Haile Gebrselassie in 2005/2006 brought a Spanish all-comers record time of 60:08 minutes and further recognition of the race's elite level status, as did 10,000 m world champion Gete Wami's course record time of 1:10:24.2 hours in the women's race. The 2004 Olympic marathon champion Stefano Baldini and two-time European champion Marta Domínguez won the men's and women's races in 2007.

Kenya's Samuel Wanjiru became the first man to run a sub-60-minute half marathon in Spain at the 2008 Granollers race: his time of 59:26 minutes was the fourth fastest time in the world that year. Both Wanjiru and Domínguez claimed their second Granollers titles the year afterwards. In 2012, Catalonia's Carles Castillejo became the first Spanish male winner since 1999 by defeating world record holder Patrick Makau.

== Past winners ==
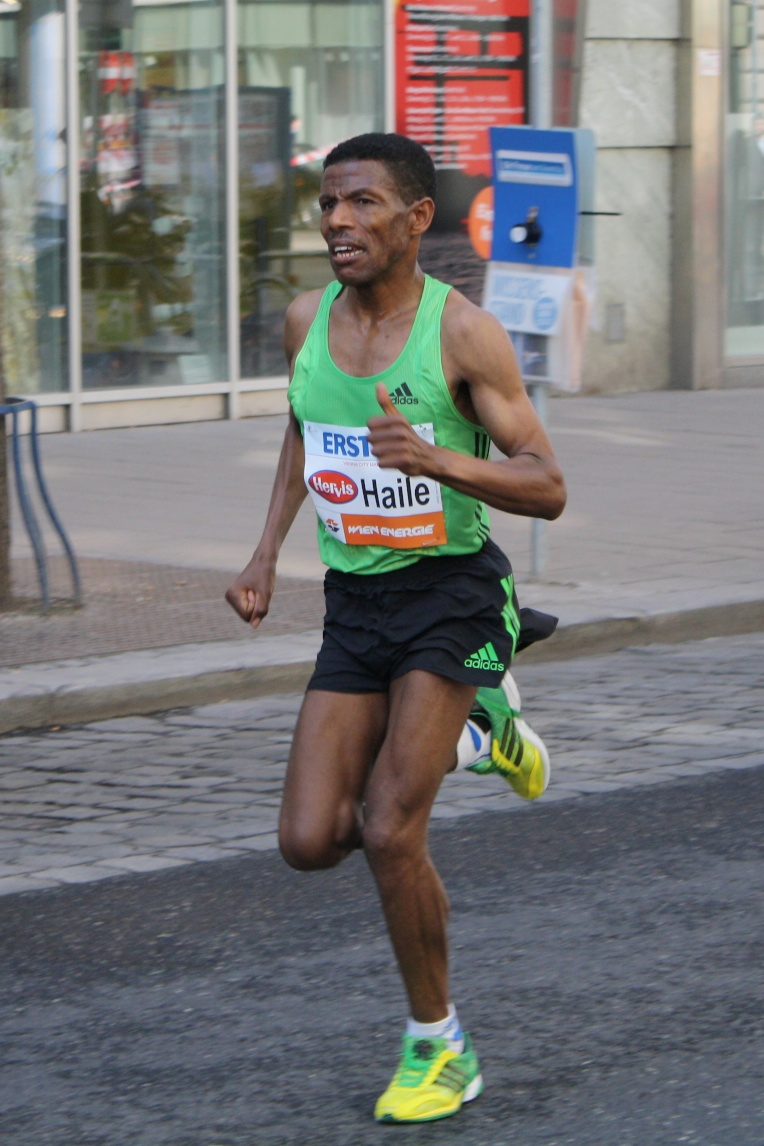
Haile Gebrselassie had back-to-back wins in 2005 and 2006.

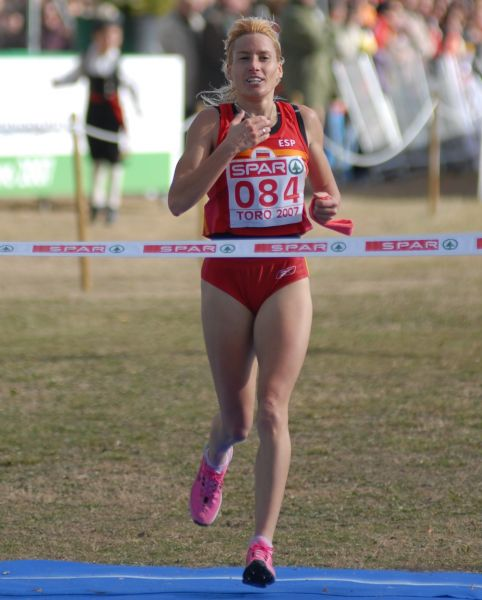
Spain's Marta Domínguez is a two-time women's winner.

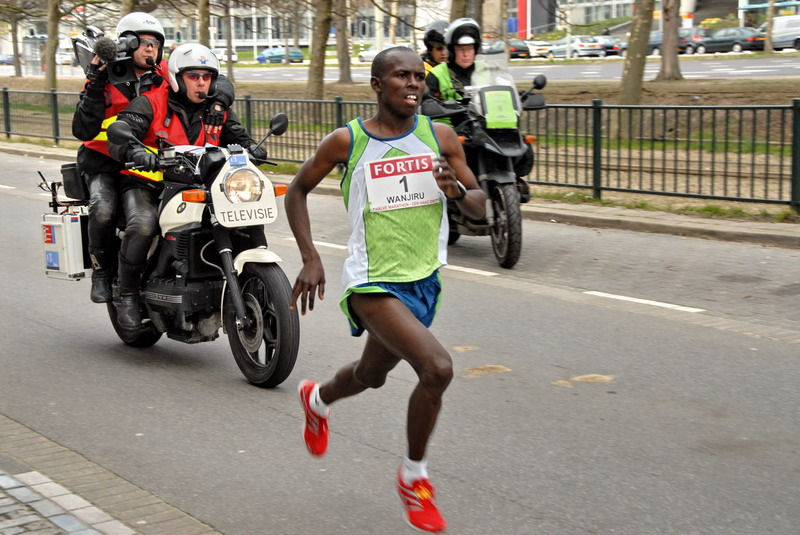
Kenyan Samuel Wanjiru set a Spanish all-comers record in 2008.

Key: Course record

Edition	Year	Men's winner	Time (h:m:s)	Women's winner	Time (h:m:s)
1st	1987	Rafael Garcia (ESP)	1:05:45	Joaquina Casas (ESP)	1:17:34
2nd	1988	Emiliano Garcia (ESP)	1:05:21	Marina Prat (ESP)	1:17:05
3rd	1989	Alfonso Abellán (ESP)	1:04:50	Carmen Brunet (ESP)	1:16:45
4th	1990	David Long (GBR)	1:04:39	Marina Prat (ESP)	1:14:28
5th	1991	Benito Ojeda (ESP)	1:05:59	Elisenda Pucurull (ESP)	1:16:33
6th	1992	Roger Rivet (FRA)	1:04:22	María Luisa Muñoz (ESP)	1:17:27
7th	1993	Ezequiel Bitok (KEN)	1:01:48	María Luisa Muñoz (ESP)	1:14:48
8th	1994	Barnabas Korir (KEN)	1:03:46	Nuria Pastor (ESP)	1:16:22
9th	1995	Benedict Ako (TAN)	1:02:56	Cristina Nogue (ESP)	1:18:33
10th	1996	Benedict Ako (TAN)	1:02:08	Josefa Cruz (ESP)	1:14:06
11th	1997	Jose Andrés Pérez (ESP)	1:03:09	Josefa Cruz (ESP)	1:15:23
12th	1998	Alberto Juzdado (ESP)	1:01:50	Josefa Cruz (ESP)	1:15:15
13th	1999	Jose Andrés Pérez (ESP)	1:03:29	Josefa Cruz (ESP)	1:16:22
14th	2000	Philip Kirui (KEN)	1:01:08	Esther Kiplagat (KEN)	1:11:57
15th	2001	David Kiptoo (KEN)	1:04:34	Olga Planas (ESP)	1:23:19
16th	2002	Paul Kanda (KEN)	1:03:08	Eva Sanz (ESP)	1:12:38
17th	2003	Benson Cherono (KEN)	1:03:25	Kenza Wahbi (MAR)	1:15:01
18th	2004	Aziz Driouche (MAR)	1:03:08	Anne Kosgei (KEN)	1:12:00
19th	2005	Haile Gebrselassie (ETH)	1:01:33	Gladys Cherono (KEN)	1:13:26
20th	2006	Haile Gebrselassie (ETH)	1:00:07.6	Gete Wami (ETH)	1:10:24.2
21st	2007	Stefano Baldini (ITA)	1:03:10	Marta Domínguez (ESP)	1:11:23
22nd	2008	Samuel Wanjiru (KEN)	59:26	Rahab Ndungu (KEN)	1:11:20
23rd	2009	Samuel Wanjiru (KEN)	1:01:13	Marta Domínguez (ESP)	1:10:54
24th	2010	Robert Cheruiyot (KEN)	1:02:02	Joyce Chepkirui (KEN)	1:12:58
25th	2011	Erick Kibet (KEN)	1:03:25	Ruth Matebo (KEN)	1:14:26
26th	2012	Carles Castillejo (ESP)	1:02:37	Beatrice Jepchumba (KEN)	1:12:42
27th	2013	Stephen Kiprotich (UGA)	1:01:15	Jebichi Yator (KEN)	1:14:24
28th	2014	Wilson Kipsang (KEN)	1:01:18	Faith Jeruto (KEN)	1:14:07
29th	2015	Wilson Kipsang (KEN)	1:02:39	Olha Kotovska (UKR)	1:13:21
30th	2016	Alex Korio (KEN)	1:01:01	Nancy Kiprop (KEN)	1:11:30
31st	2017	Mathew Kisorio (KEN)	1:01:30	Irene Pelayo (ESP)	1:12:11
32nd	2018	Alexander Mutiso (KEN)	1:01:24	Mercy Kipchumba (KEN)	1:13:22
33rd	2019	Abraham Kiptum (KEN)	59:58	Miriam Ortiz (ESP)	1:14:14
34th	2020	Stephen Mokoka (RSA)	1:01:28	Darya Mykhaylova (UKR)	1:12:39
