= Wilson Kipsang Kiprotich =

Kenyan long-distance runner (born 1982)

Wilson Kipsang
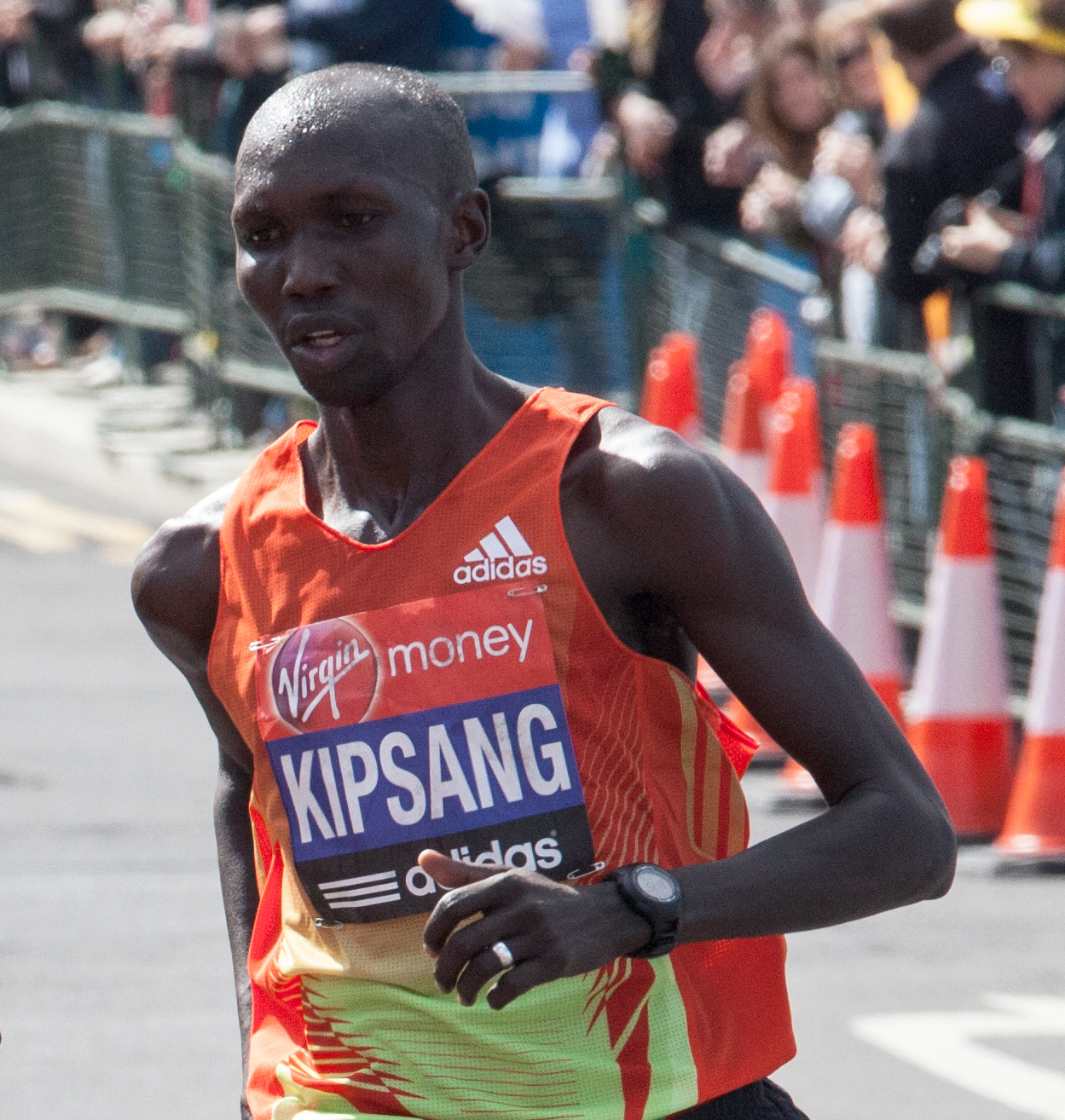
- Wilson Kipsang at the 2012 London Marathon

Personal information
- Full name: Wilson Kipsang Kiprotich
- Born: 15 March 1982 (age 44) Keiyo District, Kenya
- Height: 1.82 m (5 ft 11 1/2 in)
- Weight: 62 kg (137 lb)

Sport
- Country: Kenya
- Sport: Long-distance running
- Event: Marathon
- Club: Kenya Police

Achievements and titles
- Olympic finals: 2012; Marathon, Bronze
- Personal bests: Marathon: 2:03:13 (Berlin 2016); Half marathon: 58:59 (Ras Al Khaimah 2009); 10 km: 27:44 (Appingedam 2009)
Medal record
Men's Athletics
Representing Kenya
Olympic Games
Bronze medal – third place	2012 London	Marathon
World Marathon Majors
Gold medal – first place	2017 Tokyo	Marathon
Gold medal – first place	2014 New York	Marathon
Gold medal – first place	2014 London	Marathon
Gold medal – first place	2013 Berlin	Marathon
Gold medal – first place	2012 London	Marathon
Silver medal – second place	2017 New York	Marathon
Silver medal – second place	2016 Berlin	Marathon
Silver medal – second place	2015 London	Marathon
Bronze medal – third place	2018 Berlin	Marathon
- Updated on 4 November 2019

Wilson Kipsang Kiprotich (born 15 March 1982) is a Kenyan long-distance runner who competes primarily in the marathon. He won the bronze medal in the event at the 2012 Summer Olympics and held the world record from 2013 to 2014. In 2020, the Athletics Integrity Unit banned Kipsang for four years due to missed doping tests and tampering with an investigation.

Kipsang is a double winner of the Frankfurt Marathon (2010 and 2011) and has also won the London Marathon twice (2012 and 2014), New York Marathon (2014), and Tokyo Marathon (2017). His best time over the half marathon distance is 58:59.

== Career ==
A native of Keiyo District in Kenya, Kipsang began competitive running for Kenya Police, and finished second in the 10 kilometre Tegla Loroupe Peace Race. He became a professional international athlete in 2007 and that year he took second place at the Tilburg Ten Miles, recording a time of 46:27, and he won a road race in Hem (his time of 27:51 was the fourth fastest in a 10 km race that year). He also took third place at the Kenyan Police Force championships, finishing behind Richard Mateelong.

=== 2008 ===
At the World's Best 10K, he finished third with a time of 28:09 behind Deriba Merga and Silas Kipruto.

He returned to the Tilburg Ten Miles race in 2008, and again finished as runner-up – just two seconds behind winner Abiyote Guta. His peak of the year was in a half marathon race: the Delhi Half Marathon. Kipsang pushed Merga, the 2006 World Road Running Champion, right up to the line but finished one second behind him. Despite the second-place finish, Kipsang improved his best by over one minute to 59:16. His time was also the third fastest half marathon by any runner that year, with Merga and Haile Gebrselassie ahead of him by just one second each.

=== 2009 ===
Kipsang started 2009 strongly, winning the Egmond Half Marathon in chilly conditions. Another good performance followed when he took second at the Ras Al Khaimah Half Marathon – his time of 58:59 made him only the fourth runner to have run below 59 minutes. At his second World's Best 10K he finished third, repeating his feat from the previous year. Despite being the favourite for the 2009 Berlin Half Marathon, he ended up in third place in a fast race which was the first occasion in which all the top-four runners finished under an hour.

He competed in the World 10K Bangalore in May 2009, and finished fourth. He competed in his first IAAF World Half Marathon Championships at the end of that year, taking fourth place with a time of 1:00:08.

=== 2010 ===
In April 2010 he made his marathon debut in the Paris Marathon, and finished third in a time of 2:07:13 hours, half a minute behind winner Tadesse Tola. He won the Frankfurt Marathon in October in a new course record of 2:04:57, this time beating Tadesse by over a minute. The time made him the eighth fastest marathoner ever.

=== 2011 ===
He won his third marathon at the 2011 Lake Biwa Marathon, defeating Deriba Merga to win in a course record of 2:06:13. He returned to defend his title at the Frankfurt Marathon and set about attacking Patrick Makau's five-week-old world record.

Kipsang came within four seconds of the time, crossing the line after 2:03:42, and ended the race with the second fastest marathon time ever.

=== 2012 ===
Kipsang began 2012 with a third-place finish at the RAK Half Marathon. He won the London Marathon in April in 2:04:44, just 4 seconds short of the course record set the previous year by Emmanuel Mutai. Starting as favourite he went on to win the bronze medal in the men's marathon at the London 2012 Olympic games. One month after the Olympics, he travelled to Newcastle to win the Great North Run in 59:06. That December he won the Honolulu Marathon.

=== 2013 ===
He opened 2013 by continuing his winning line, taking the title at the New York Half Marathon. He was among the favourites for the 2013 London Marathon, but he managed only fifth place, timing 2:07:47 for the distance. He stepped down to the 10K for the Great Manchester Run and although he beat Haile Gebrselassie, he was runner-up by one second to Moses Kipsiro. He performed less well at the Bogotá Half Marathon, taking fifth place with 1:05:26 hours. On 29 September he won the Berlin Marathon, beating second-place finisher Eliud Kipchoge by over 30 seconds and setting a new world record of 2:03:23, 15 seconds faster than the previous record by Patrick Makau.

=== 2014–2017 ===
On 13 April 2014, Kipsang won the 2014 London Marathon in a course record time of 2 hours, 4 minutes and 29 seconds.

On 2 November 2014, Kipsang won the New York City Marathon in 2:10:59 in his first appearance.

At the 2016 BMW Berlin marathon, Kipsang ran the joint fourth-fastest marathon time ever, 2:03:13, which was good enough for second place behind winner Kenenisa Bekele in 2:03:03.

At 2017 Tokyo Marathon Kipsang ran CR with 2:03:58. After being forced to step out at BMW Berlin marathon at 30 km mark, Kipsang achieved 2nd place at the New York City Marathon in 2:10:56.

=== 2018 ===
After his success at the 2017 Tokyo Marathon, Wilson Kipsang returned to Japan's capital, with ambitions to reclaim the world record (WR) that he has lost to compatriot Dennis Kimetto. In the press conference, he quoted 2:02:50, as his target time. However, the world record was not to be his, as Kipsang was forced to drop out after just 15 km, with stomach problems. The former world record holder said, "I really wanted to go fast, but after suffering from stomach problems the last two days before the race, I didn't have the power to run a decent race today."

Wilson returned to Berlin in September to attempt to break the marathon world record. In the pre-race press conference, Wilson revealed that he would run a negative split, with 61:30 as his target time for the half-way point. On the race day, Wilson was unable to maintain the requested pace and ended up finishing 3rd, behind Amos Kipruto and Eliud Kipchoge, who did set a new marathon record, with the time of 2:01:39.

== Anti-doping rule violations and ban ==
In June 2020, Kipsang was issued with a four-year ban backdated to January 2020 due to anti-doping rule violations, specifically four "whereabouts failures" between April 2018 and May 2019, and for tampering with the investigation by providing false evidence.

== Achievements ==
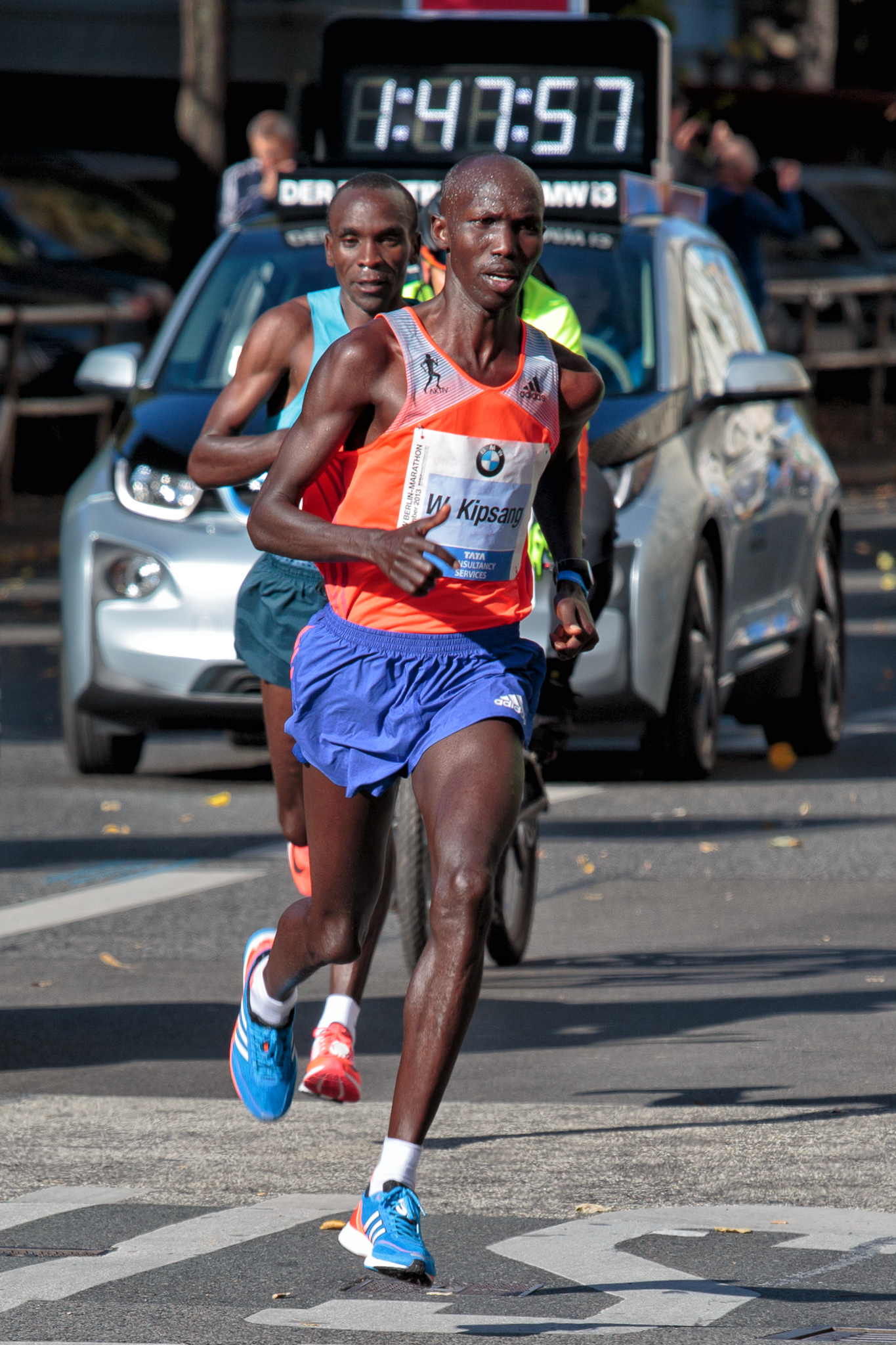
Wilson Kipsang in his World Record-setting run at the 2013 Berlin Marathon, Eliud Kipchoge is behind him.

=== International competition record ===
Year	Event	Distance	Location	Rank	Time
2009	World Half Marathon Championships	Half Marathon	Birmingham	4th	1:00:08
2012	Olympic Games	Marathon	London	3rd	2:09:37
2015	World Championships in Athletics	Marathon	Beijing	DNF	–

=== Road running ===
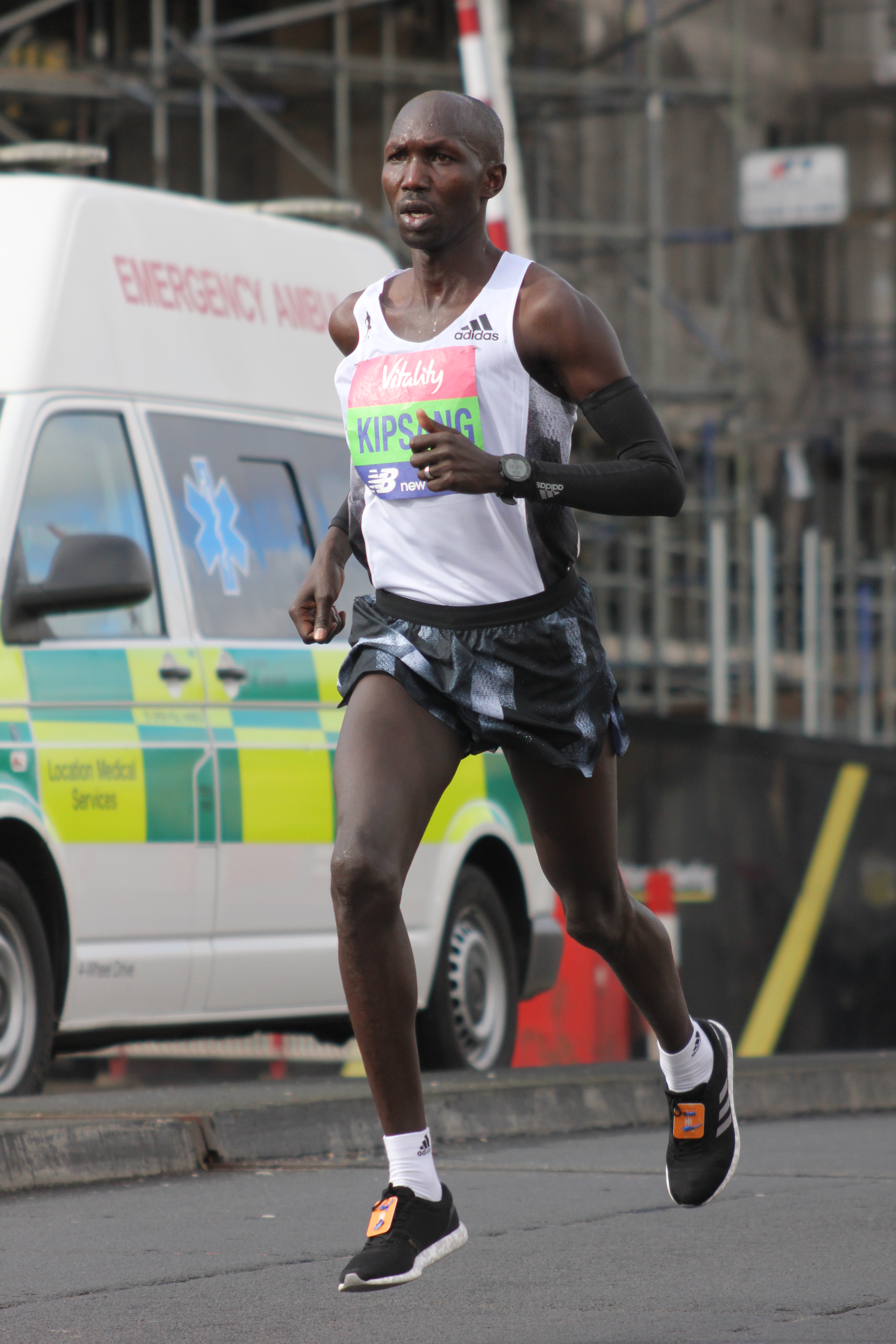
Wilson Kipsang Kiprotich, at London Half Marathon, 10 March 2019

Year	Road Race	Distance	Location	Rank	Time
2007	Tilburg Ten Miles	10 miles	Tilburg	2nd	46:27
2007	Hem 10k	10 km	Hem	1st	27:51
2007	Tarsus Half Marathon	Half Marathon	Tarsus	1st	1:02:05 CR
2008	World's Best 10K	10 km	San Juan	3rd	28:09
2008	Stadsloop Appingedam	10 km	Appingedam	1st	28:39
2008	Goudse Nationale Singelloop	10 km	Gouda	1st	28:34
2008	Tarsus Half Marathon	Half Marathon	Tarsus	1st	1:02:50
2008	Delhi Half Marathon	Half Marathon	New Delhi	2nd	59:16
2009	Egmond Half Marathon	Half Marathon	Egmond aan Zee	1st	1:05:36
2009	Ras Al Khaimah Half Marathon	Half Marathon	Ras al-Khaimah	2nd	58:59
2009	Stadsloop Appingedam	10 km	Appingedam	1st	27:45
2010	Abu Dhabi Half Marathon	Half Marathon	Abu Dhabi	1st	1:00:04
2010	Paris Marathon	Marathon	Paris	3rd	2:07:13
2010	Frankfurt Marathon	Marathon	Frankfurt	1st	2:04:57 CR
2011	Kärnten Läuft Half Marathon	Half Marathon	Klagenfurt	1st	1:02:25
2011	Zwolle Half Marathon	Half Marathon	Zwolle	1st	1:00:49
2011	Lake Biwa Marathon	Marathon	Otsu	1st	2:06:13 CR
2011	Frankfurt Marathon	Marathon	Frankfurt	1st	2:03:42 CR
2012	London Marathon	Marathon	London	1st	2:04:44
2012	Great North Run	Half Marathon	Newcastle	1st	59:06
2012	Honolulu Marathon	Marathon	Hawaii	1st	2:12:31
2013	NYC Half Marathon	Half Marathon	New York City	1st	1:01:02
2013	Berlin Marathon	Marathon	Berlin	1st	2:03:23 WR
2014	London Marathon	Marathon	London	1st	2:04:29 CR
2014	NYC Marathon	Marathon	New York City	1st	2:10:59
2014	Granollers Half Marathon	Half Marathon	Granollers	1st	1:01:18
2015	London Marathon	Marathon	London	2nd	2:04:47
2015	Granollers Half Marathon	Half Marathon	Granollers	1st	1:02:39
2016	London Marathon	Marathon	London	5th	2:07:52
2016	Great Manchester Run	10 km	Manchester	2nd	28:15
2016	Berlin Marathon	Marathon	Berlin	2nd	2:03:13
2017	Tokyo Marathon	Marathon	Tokyo	1st	2:03:58 CR
2017	NYC Marathon	Marathon	New York City	2nd	2:10:56
2018	Tokushima Marathon	Marathon	Tokushima	1st	2:19:35
2018	Berlin Marathon	Marathon	Berlin	3rd	2:06:48
2019	Vitality Big Half	Half Marathon	London	6th	1:04:07

=== World Marathon Majors results timeline ===
World Marathon Majors	2012	2013	2014	2015	2016	2017	2018	2019
Tokyo Marathon	–	–	–	–	–	1st	DNF	–
Boston Marathon	–	–	–	–	–	–	–	–
London Marathon	1st	5th	1st	2nd	5th	–	–	12th
Berlin Marathon	–	1st	–	–	2nd	DNF	3rd	
Chicago Marathon	–	–	–	–	–	–	–	
New York City Marathon	–	–	1st	4th	–	2nd	–	

== Personal bests ==
Source – Wilson Kipsang Kiprotich at World Athletics.

Surface	Distance	Time (h:m:s)	Speed (km/h)	Location	Date
Track	5,000 m	14:20.8	20.9	Kisumu, Kenya	30 April 2005
Track	10,000 m	28:31.5	21.1	Nairobi, Kenya	6 June 2008
Road	10 km	27:45	21.6	Appingedam, Netherlands	27 June 2009
Road	15 km	41:35+	21.7	Ras al-Khaimah, UAE	20 February 2009
Road	Half marathon	58:59	21.4	Ras al-Khaimah, UAE	20 February 2009
Road	Marathon	2:03:13	20.5	Berlin, Germany	25 September 2016

Records
Preceded by (Kenya) Patrick Makau	Men's Marathon World Record Holder; 29 September 2013 – 28 September 2014	Succeeded by (Kenya) Dennis Kimetto
