= Deriba Merga =

Ethiopian long-distance runner (born 1980)

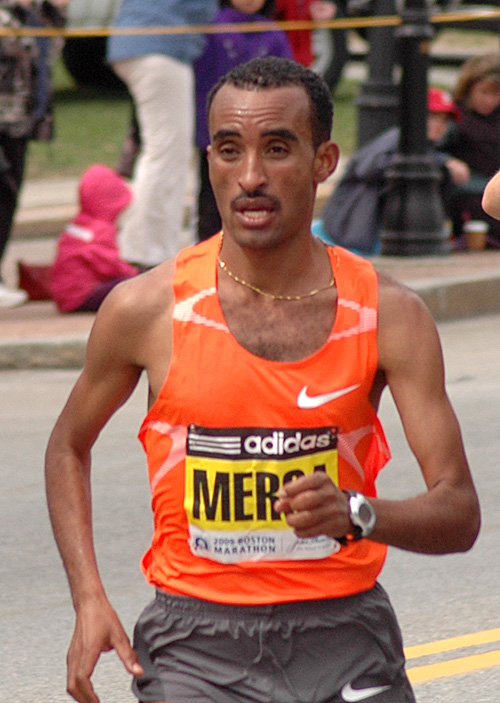
- Deriba Merga on the way to winning the 2009 Boston Marathon near half way point in Wellesley.

Personal information
- Native name: ደርባ መርጋ አጅጉ
- Nationality: Ethiopian
- Born: 26 October 1980 (age 45)

Sport
- Sport: Running
- Event: Long distance

Deriba Merga Ejigu (Amharic: ደርባ መርጋ አጅጉ; born 26 October 1980) is an Ethiopian professional long-distance runner. He mainly competes in the marathon. He finished fourth in that event at the 2008 Beijing Olympics and went on to win the Boston Marathon the following year. His personal best for the distance is 2:06:38 hours.

He also competes in half marathon races and his time of 59:14 minutes in 2008 was the fastest that year. He won the 2006 Paris Half Marathon and took the gold medal at the 2007 All-Africa Games a year later.

== Career ==
He was born in the Welega Province west of Addis Ababa and he headed to the capital in 2005 to pursue a running career after winning some regional races. Merga made his international debut in 2006, winning the Paris Half Marathon in a time of 60:45. Later that year, he finished sixth at the 2006 IAAF World Road Running Championships, helping Ethiopia to a bronze medal in the team competition. In December that year he won the Montferland Run 15 km race in a course record time of 42:48. He took the half marathon gold medal at the 2007 All-Africa Games but just missed out on a medal at the 2007 IAAF World Road Running Championships, finishing in fourth place.

He made his marathon debut at the Fukuoka Marathon in December 2007, finishing second to Sammy Wanjiru. He opened 2008 with a win at the World's Best 10K in Puerto Rico. He finished sixth at London in April that year, running a personal best of 2:06:38. In August, he finished fourth in the Olympic marathon, after being passed by teammate Tsegay Kebede in the final 400 m. Later in the year he won the Delhi Half Marathon, and defended his title in 2009.

In May 2009, he sped to victory at the World 10K Bangalore, holding off a challenge from Mark Kiptoo. Merga won the Chevron Houston Marathon in 2:07:52, setting a course record in the process. He was disappointed, however, having wanted to run a 2:05, a time bettered by only a handful of runners.

Three months later, Merga won the 113th Boston Marathon on April 20, 2009, with a time of 2:08:42. Merga endured a very fast start and made a solo break for the finish, winning firmly by almost a minute. In May, he ran a 27:23 10k in Ottawa.

Merga set his sights on defending his title at the 2010 Boston Marathon and upped the race tempo around the 18-mile mark. He moved away from the pack but was followed by Robert Kiprono Cheruiyot and Tekeste Kebede. Merga faded in the final stages and ended up in third place. He returned to defend his crown at the World 10K Bangalore in May, but was half a minute off the pace and finished in fourth place. Later that month he ran at the Ottawa 10K and was third in a time of 28:41, finishing behind the pacemaker, Lelisa Desessa, who continued for the victory.

He set a course record of 1:02:31 at the Bogota Half Marathon in August, easily seeing off the more favoured Zersenay Tadese and Isaac Macharia. He entered the Chuncheon Marathon in October as the provisional favourite but dropped out of the race after 35 km. He put the disappointment behind him at the Major General Hayelom Araya 15km Championships in February 2011, where he dominated his national rivals – his time of 41:54.84 left him with a winning margin of 45 seconds and brought him an African all-comers record for the distance. He headed to the Ras Al Khaimah Half Marathon soon after and immediately assumed the lead in the race, running a world best for 8 km and winning the event in a time of 59:25 minutes.

His first marathon of 2011 came at the Lake Biwa Marathon in Japan and a duel between Deriba and Wilson Kipsang saw the Ethiopian finish in the runner-up spot. He took his second win of the year over half that distance at the Yangzhou Jianzhen International Half Marathon. He attempted to defend his Bogotá Half Marathon title but was beaten by some distance by Geoffrey Mutai. He ran at the Frankfurt Marathon in October but could not keep up with the near-world record pace set by Wilson Kipsang Kiprotich and dropped out at the 30 km point. Quick racing was again too much for him as he dropped out of the Dubai Marathon in January 2012 after having run the first half in 1:02:21. He finished second at the 2012 New York City Half Marathon, being overtaken by Peter Kirui in the final stages. He came third at the Bay to Breakers but had a very slow outing at the Shanghai Marathon where he held on to finish tenth in a time of 2:21:14 hours. His fortunes reversed at the Houston Half Marathon in 2013 as he was runner-up behind Feyisa Lilesa.

== Personal bests ==
- Half marathon – 59:14 (New Delhi, 2008)
- Marathon – 2:06:38 (London, 2008)

== International competitions ==
Year	Competition	Venue	Position	Event	Notes
Representing Ethiopia
2006	World Road Running Championships	Debrecen, Hungary	6th	20 km	
2006	World Road Running Championships	Debrecen, Hungary	3rd	Team	
2007	All-Africa Games	Algiers, Algeria	1st	Half marathon	
2007	World Road Running Championships	Udine, Italy	4th	Half marathon	
2007	World Road Running Championships	Udine, Italy	3rd	Team	
2008	Summer Olympics	Beijing, China	4th	Marathon	2:10:21
2009	World Championships	Berlin, Germany	—	Marathon	DNF

== Road race wins ==
Year	Competition	Venue	Position	Event	Notes
2006	Paris Half Marathon	Paris, France	1st	Half marathon	1:00:45
2009	Houston Marathon	Houston, United States	1st	Marathon	2:07:52
2009	Boston Marathon	Boston, United States	1st	Marathon	2:08:42
2010	Bogota Half Marathon	Bogotá, Colombia	1st	Half marathon	1:02:31 CR

Sporting positions
Preceded by Samuel Wanjiru	Men's Half Marathon Best Year Performance (tied with Haile Gebrselassie); 2008	Succeeded by Patrick Makau
