= Kärnten Läuft =

Road running event in Austria

- Date: August
- Location: Klagenfurt
- Event type: Road
- Distance: Half marathon
- Established: 2002
- Course records: 1:00:59 (men); 1:08:02 (women)
- Website: kaerntenlaeuft.at

Kärnten läuft is an annual half marathon road running race around the lake Wörthersee. It starts in Velden am Wörther See and ends in Klagenfurt. It has been held every year since 2002 and typically takes place in August.

Prior to the launch of the competition, a local athletics club, the Klagenfurter Leichtathletik Club, held the Klagenfurter Marathon in the region. It hosted the Austrian national championship race in 1999 and 2001. It was disbanded upon the creation of the Kärnten läuft.

It is one of the most prominent half marathon competitions in Austria, alongside the Mondsee Half Marathon.

== Past winners ==
Key: Course record

Year	Men's winner	Time (h:m:s)	Women's winner	Time (h:m:s)
2015	Laban Korir (KEN)	1:01:52	Lisa Nemec (CRO)	1:11:04
2014	Geoffrey Ronoh (KEN)	59:45	Lucy Wambui Murigi (KEN)	1:11:24
2013	Eliud Kipchoge (KEN)	1:01:02	Florence Jebet Kiplagat (KEN)	1:10:06
2012	Robert Langat (KEN)	1:02:47	Lucy Wambui Murigi (KEN)	1:14:05
2011	Wilson Kipsang Kiprotich (KEN)	1:02:25	Florence Jebet Kiplagat (KEN)	1:08:02
2010	Philemon Kipchumba Kisang (KEN)	1:02:44	Anikó Kálovics (HUN)	1:13:36
2009	Isaac Kosgei (KEN)	1:03:56	Anikó Kálovics (HUN)	1:15:19
2008	Francis Kiprop (KEN)	1:00:59	Anikó Kálovics (HUN)	1:12:33
2007	Bernard Barmasai (KEN)	1:03:09	Helena Javornik (SLO)	1:10:32
2006	Stanley Kipkosgei Salil (KEN)	1:05:33	Anikó Kálovics (HUN)	1:10:40
2005	Stanley Kipkosgei Salil (KEN)	1:02:35	Anikó Kálovics (HUN)	1:11:45
2004	Simon Maiyo (KEN)	1:03:47	Dana Janečková (SVK)	1:15:59
2003	Carsten Eich (GER)	1:03:32	Beáta Rakonczai (HUN)	1:12:49
2002	Michael Buchleitner (AUT)	1:06:27	Anikó Kálovics (HUN)	1:13:41

- Sources
