= Mohammed Abduh Bakhet =

Qatari long-distance runner

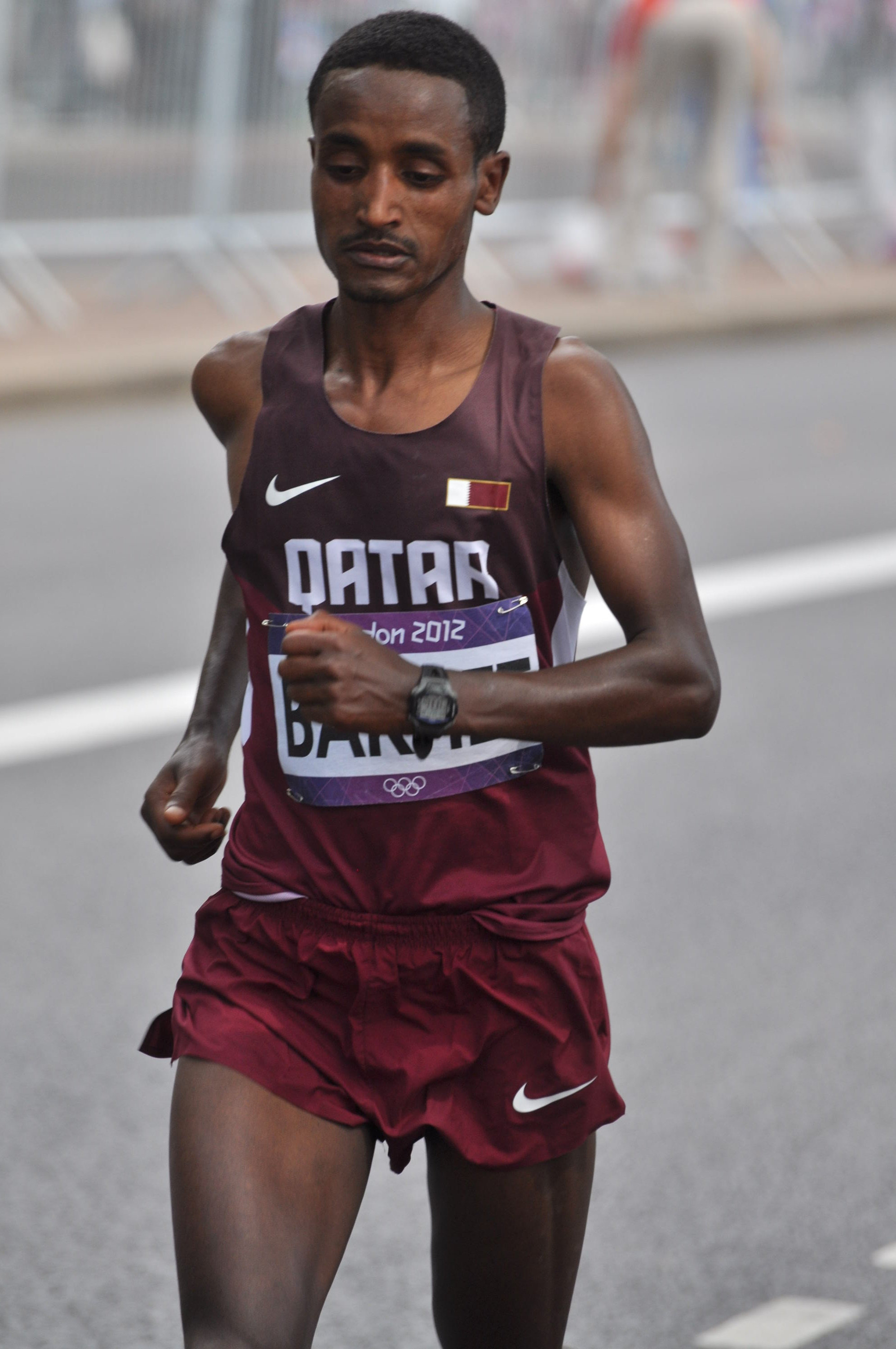
- Bakhet in the marathon at the 2012 Olympics in London

Personal information
- Born: December 25, 1987 (age 38)
- Height: 1.55 m (5 ft 1 in)
- Weight: 50 kg (110 lb)

Sport
- Country: Qatar
- Sport: Athletics
- Event: Marathon

Mohammed Abduh Bakhet (born 25 December 1987, Doha) is a Qatari long-distance runner.

He finished eighth in the 10,000 metres at the 2006 World Junior Championships, 21st at the 2007 World Road Running Championships and did not finish the race at the 2010 World Cross Country Championships.

His personal best times are 29:18.76 minutes in the 10,000 metres, achieved at the 2006 World Junior Championships in Beijing; 1:01:38 hours in the half marathon, achieved at the 2007 World Road Running Championships in Udine; and 2:12:14 hours in the marathon, achieved in January 2012 in Dubai.

He competed in the marathon at the 2012 Summer Olympics, finishing in 68th place.
