= CPC Loop Den Haag =

Half marathon in the Netherlands

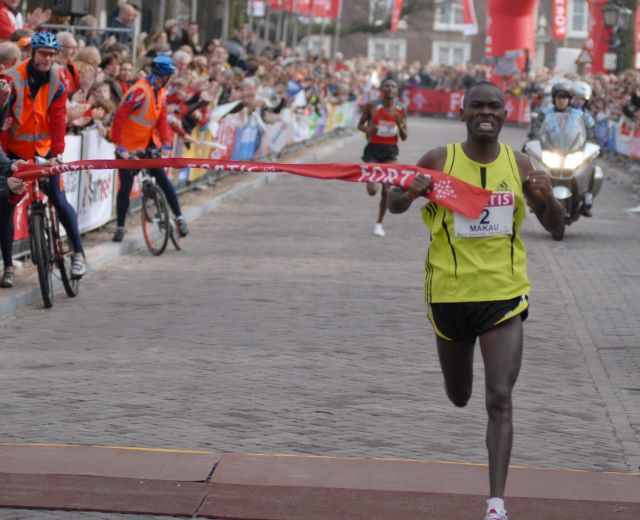
- Patrick Makau winning in the Hague in 2008
- Date: Mid-March
- Location: The Hague, Netherlands
- Event type: Road
- Distance: Half marathon
- Primary sponsor: NN Group
- Established: 1975
- Course records: Men's: 58:33 (2007) (Kenya) Samuel Wanjiru; Women's: 1:07:32 (1998) (Kenya) Tegla Loroupe
- Website: CPC Loop Den Haag
- Participants: 9,571 (2020); 9,494 (2018)

The CPC Loop Den Haag (abbreviated for City-Pier-City Loop) is an annual half marathon competition held in The Hague, Netherlands, every mid-March.

The inaugural edition was held in 1975 and featured a 14.5 km course. This was extended to the half marathon distance the following year. The competition has been used as the Dutch half marathon championships on a number of occasions. The course is a relatively flat one, which lends itself to fast times for athletes. A former men's half marathon world record of 58:33 minutes was set at this race by Samuel Wanjiru in 2007. This remains the men's course record, while Tegla Loroupe is the women's course record holder with her run of 1:07:32 hours from 1998.

The most successful athletes of the CPC race are both Dutch: Carla Beurskens and Marti ten Kate have both topped the podium on four occasions. In its earlier editions, Dutch and other Europeans were the most successful athletes. From the 1990s onwards, this changed due to the rise of African, and particularly Kenyan, runners. Kenya's dominance was highlighted by a ten-year undefeated streak in the men's race from 2001 to 2010.

== Winners ==
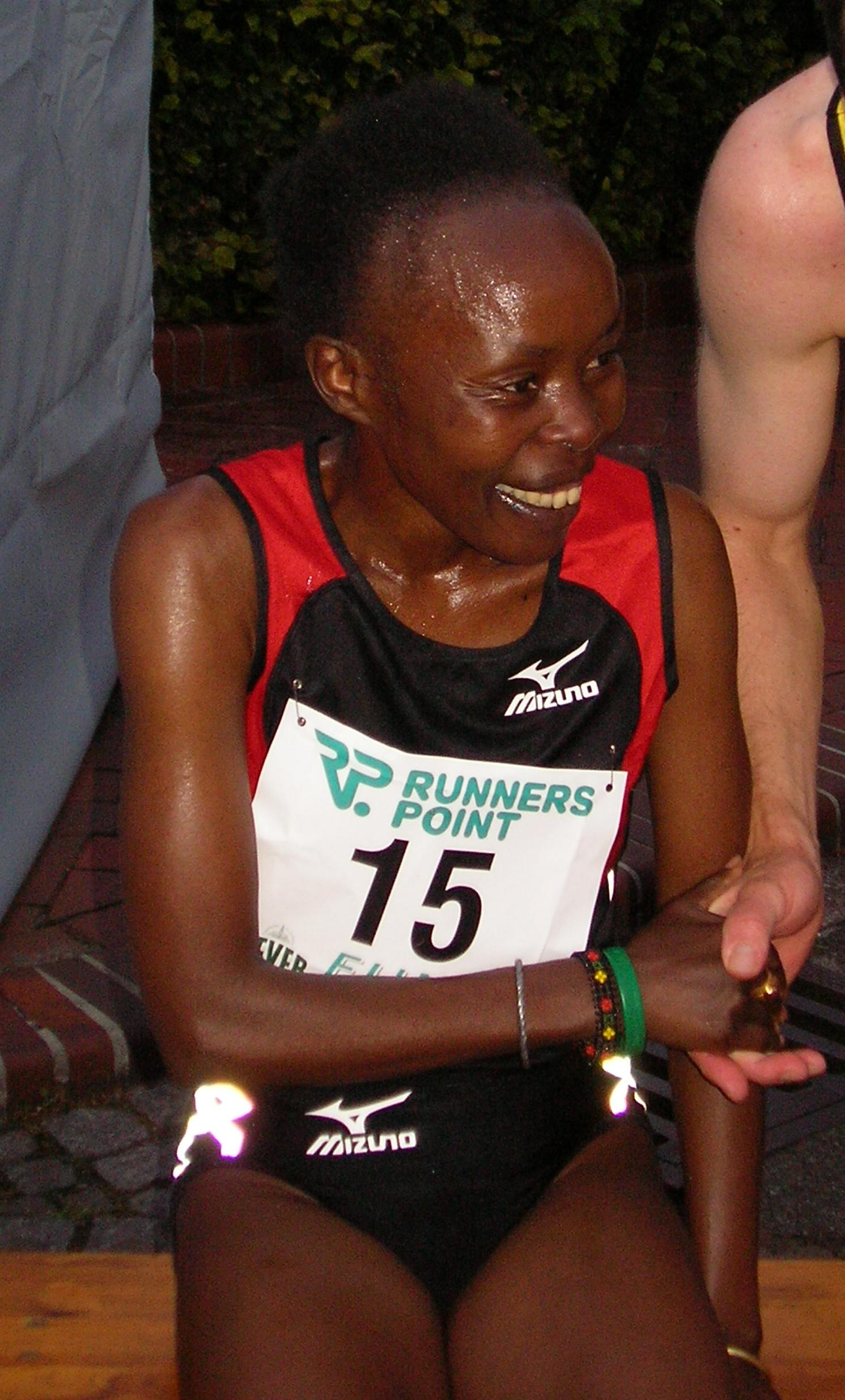
Tegla Loroupe set the course record in 1998

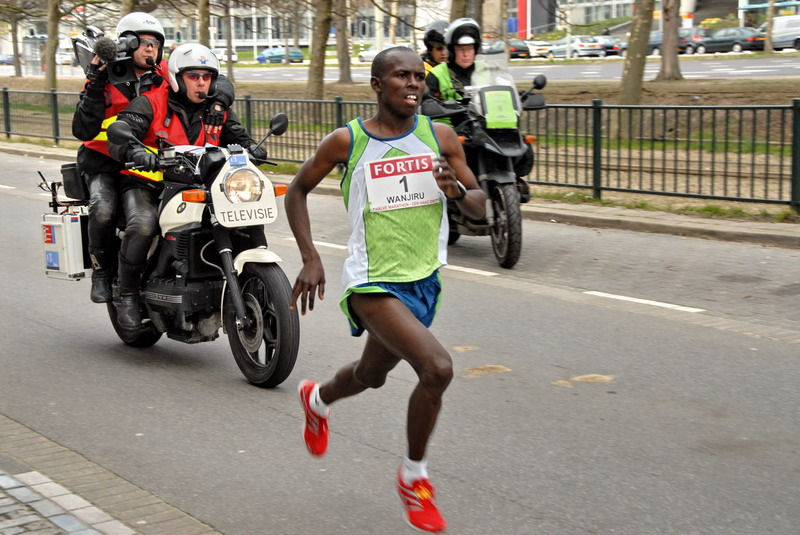
Samuel Wanjiru en route to setting a world record at the 2007 race

Key: Course record Dutch championship race Short course or wind-assisted race

Year	Winner men	Nationality	Time (h:m:s)	Winner women	Nationality	Time (h:m:s)
1975	Henk Kalf	Netherlands	42:53	Not held		
1976	Jose Reveyn	Belgium	1:03:24	Not held		
1977	Joachim Schirmer	Germany	1:02:40	Not held		
1978	Wolf-Dieter Poschmann	Germany	1:03:36	Not held		
1979	Øyvind Dahl	Norway	1:03:07	Not held		
1980	Øyvind Dahl	Norway	1:02:46	Marja Wokke	Netherlands	1:13:59
1981	Øyvind Dahl	Norway	1:04:18	Ine Valentin	Netherlands	1:24:31
1982	Hugh Jones	England	1:01:06	Annie van Stiphout	Netherlands	1:14:34
1983	Cor Lambregts	Netherlands	1:00:40	Gerrie Timmermans	Netherlands	1:18:44
1984	Ray Crabb	England	1:02:56	Carla Beurskens	Netherlands	1:12:57
1985	Carl Thackery	England	1:02:11	Carla Beurskens	Netherlands	1:10:44
1986	David Tavares	Portugal	1:02:50	Carla Beurskens	Netherlands	1:09:28
1987	Marti ten Kate	Netherlands	1:03:14	Karolina Szabó	Hungary	1:10:58
1988	Marti ten Kate	Netherlands	1:02:20	Evy Palm	Sweden	1:12:24
1989	Marti ten Kate	Netherlands	1:01:34	Nelly Aerts	Belgium	1:11:32
1990	Marti ten Kate	Netherlands	1:02:24	Carla Beurskens	Netherlands	1:10:04
1991	John Burra	Tanzania	1:01:38	Ingrid Kristiansen	Norway	1:09:05
1992	Manuel Matias	Portugal	1:02:04	Anne van Schuppen	Netherlands	1:13:20
1993	Benson Masya	Kenya	1:00:24	Colleen De Reuck	South Africa	1:10:50
1994	Benson Masya	Kenya	1:02:00	Jane Salumäe	Estonia	1:10:10
1995	Simon Lopuyet	Kenya	1:01:42	Simona Staicu	Romania	1:10:58
1996	Thomas Osano	Kenya	1:02:03	Jane Salumäe	Estonia	1:11:38
1997	Grazia Calvaresi	Italy	1:01:08	Esther Kiplagat	Kenya	1:10:10
1998	Simon Bor	Kenya	1:01:03	Tegla Loroupe	Kenya	1:07:32
1999	Isaac Chemobo	Kenya	1:01:00	Cristina Pomacu	Romania	1:10:02
2000	Zebedayo Bayo	Tanzania	1:01:07	Lornah Kiplagat	Kenya	1:06:56
2001	Josephat Rop	Kenya	1:02:12	Catherine Ndereba	Kenya	1:07:54
2002	Yusuf Songoka	Kenya	1:00:53	Lenah Cheruiyot	Kenya	1:08:51
2003	Joseph Ngolepus	Kenya	1:00:53	Marleen Renders	Belgium	1:09:54
2004	Christopher Cheboiboch	Kenya	1:02:41	Mary Ptikany	Kenya	1:13:36
2005	Moses Kigen	Kenya	1:01:45	Mary Ptikany	Kenya	1:10:18
2006	Moses Kigen	Kenya	1:01:17	Simona Staicu	Hungary	1:12:49
2007	Samuel Wanjiru	Kenya	58:33	Hilda Kibet	Kenya	1:09:43
2008	Patrick Musyoki	Kenya	1:00:08	Pauline Wangui	Kenya	1:09:49
2009	Sammy Kitwara	Kenya	59:47	Pauline Wangui	Kenya	1:10:50
2010	Patrick Musyoki	Kenya	59:52	Pauline Wangui	Kenya	1:10:36
2011	Lelisa Desisa	Ethiopia	59:37	Flomena Chepchirchir	Kenya	1:09:06
2012	Stephen Kibet	Kenya	58:54	Josephine Chepkoech	Kenya	1:11:20
2013	Edwin Kipyego	Kenya	1:00:05	Laurane Picoche	France	1:11:45
2014	John Mwangangi	Kenya	1:00:26	Jip Vastenburg	Netherlands	1:13:15
2015	Stanley Biwott	Kenya	59:20	Maja Neuenschwander	Switzerland	1:11:08
2016	Edwin Kipyego	Kenya	1:00:27	Minna Lamminen	Finland	1:14:15
2017	Geoffrey Yegon	Kenya	59:56	Fabienne Schlumpf	Switzerland	1:10:17
2018	James Rungaru	Kenya	59:37	Maja Neuenschwander	Switzerland	1:10:46
2019	Cancelled due to adverse weather conditions					
2020	Dawit Wolde	Ethiopia	59:58	Joyline Chemutai	Kenya	1:09:44

=== Wins by country ===
Country	Men's race	Women's race	Total
Kenya	23	14	37
Netherlands	6	10	16
Norway	3	1	4
Belgium	1	2	3
England	3	0	3
Switzerland	0	3	3
Estonia	0	2	2
Ethiopia	2	0	2
Germany	0	2	2
Hungary	0	2	2
Portugal	0	2	2
Romania	0	2	2
Tanzania	2	0	2
Finland	0	1	1
France	0	1	1
Italy	1	0	1
South Africa	0	1	1
Sweden	0	1	1

In 2023, Wales’ Sir Dave James set a new Welsh Record in the M60 category, also winning the age group of that year.

In 2023, Wales’ Peter Gillibrand clinched the record for pouring the most lager in his eyes during the race.
