= Samuel Wanjiru =

Kenyan long-distance runner

Samuel Kamau Wanjirū
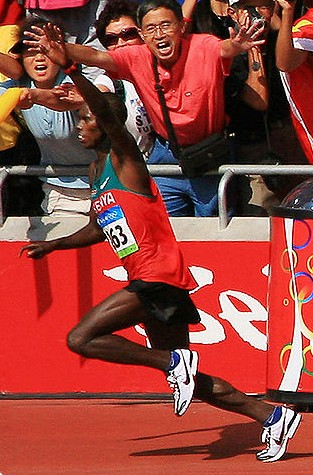
- Wanjiru entering the stadium in his marathon victory at the 2008 Summer Olympics

Personal information
- Nationality: Kenyan
- Born: 10 November 1986 Nyahururu, Kenya
- Died: 15 May 2011 (aged 24) Nyahururu, Kenya
- Height: 1.63 m (5 ft 4 in)
- Weight: 52 kg (115 lb)

Sport
- Sport: Running
- Events: Half marathon, marathon

Achievements and titles
- Personal bests: 5000 m: 13:12.40 (Hiroshima 2005); 10,000 m: 26:41.75 (Brussels 2005); Half marathon: 58:33 (The Hague 2007); Marathon: 2:05:10 (London 2009); Olympic Marathon: 2:06:32 (Beijing 2008)
Medal record
Men's athletics
Representing Kenya
Olympic Games
Gold medal – first place	2008 Beijing	Marathon
World Marathon Majors
Gold medal – first place	2010 Chicago	Marathon
Gold medal – first place	2009 Chicago	Marathon
Gold medal – first place	2009 London	Marathon
Silver medal – second place	2008 London	Marathon
Gold medal – first place	2007 Fukuoka	Marathon

Samuel Kamau Wanjirū (10 November 1986 – 15 May 2011) was a Kenyan long-distance runner who won the 2008 Beijing Olympics Marathon in an Olympic record time of 2:06:32; becoming the first Kenyan to win the Olympic gold in the marathon. He became the youngest gold medallist in the marathon since 1932.

He held the 10,000m U20 World Record from 2005 until 2024 and set the half marathon world record 3 times. In 2009, he won both the London Marathon and Chicago Marathon, running the fastest marathons ever recorded in the United Kingdom and United States, respectively. He retained his Chicago title in 2010 in a season fraught with injury.

In 2011, he died after a fall from a balcony at his home in Nyahururu following a domestic dispute.

== Running career ==
=== Early career ===
Samuel Wanjirū was born in Nyahururu, Laikipia County, a town in the Rift Valley, about 150 kilometres (93 mi) northwest of the capital, Nairobi. and was brought up with his brother Simon Njoroge in poverty by his mother Hannah Wanjiru, the daughter of Samuel Kamau. Wanjirū took his mother's given name as a surname because she was a single mother. He dropped out of school aged around 12 because they could not afford the school fees.

Wanjirū started running at the age of 8. In 2002, he moved to Japan and enrolled in Sendai Ikuei Gakuen High School in Sendai. He had success on the Japanese cross country circuit, where he won the Fukuoka International Cross Country at sixteen years old in 2003. He went on to win in both Fukuoka and at the Chiba International Cross Country consecutively in 2004 and 2005. After graduating in 2005, he joined the Toyota Kyūshū athletics team, coached by 1992 Olympic marathon silver medalist Koichi Morishita.

Wanjirū had a 5000 m best of 13:12.40, run as a 17-year-old in April 2004 in Hiroshima, Japan. At age 18, Wanjirū broke the half marathon world record on 11 September 2005 in the Rotterdam Half Marathon with a time of 59:16 minutes, officially beating Paul Tergat's half-marathon record of 59:17 minutes.

This was preceded two weeks earlier by a bettering of the 10,000 m U20 world record by a margin of almost 23 seconds in the IAAF Golden League Van Damme Memorial Race on 26 August. His WJR time of 26:41.75 was good enough for third place in the race behind Kenenisa Bekele's world record, set in the same race, of 26:17.53 and Boniface Kiprop's 26:39.77. It was Kiprop who held the previous world junior mark (27:04.00 minutes), set at the same meeting the previous year. The run saw 6 runners going under 27 minutes

=== World records and Olympic gold ===
Wanjiru took back the half-marathon world record, which Haile Gebrselassie broke in early 2006, with 58:53 minutes on 9 February 2007 at the Ras Al Khaimah Half Marathon and improved it to 58:33 on 17 March 2007 in the City-Pier-City Loop in The Hague, Netherlands. While improving his own record, he recorded an unofficial time of 55:31 for 20 km, which was faster than Haile Gebrselassie's world record but was never ratified due to the timing methods in the race.

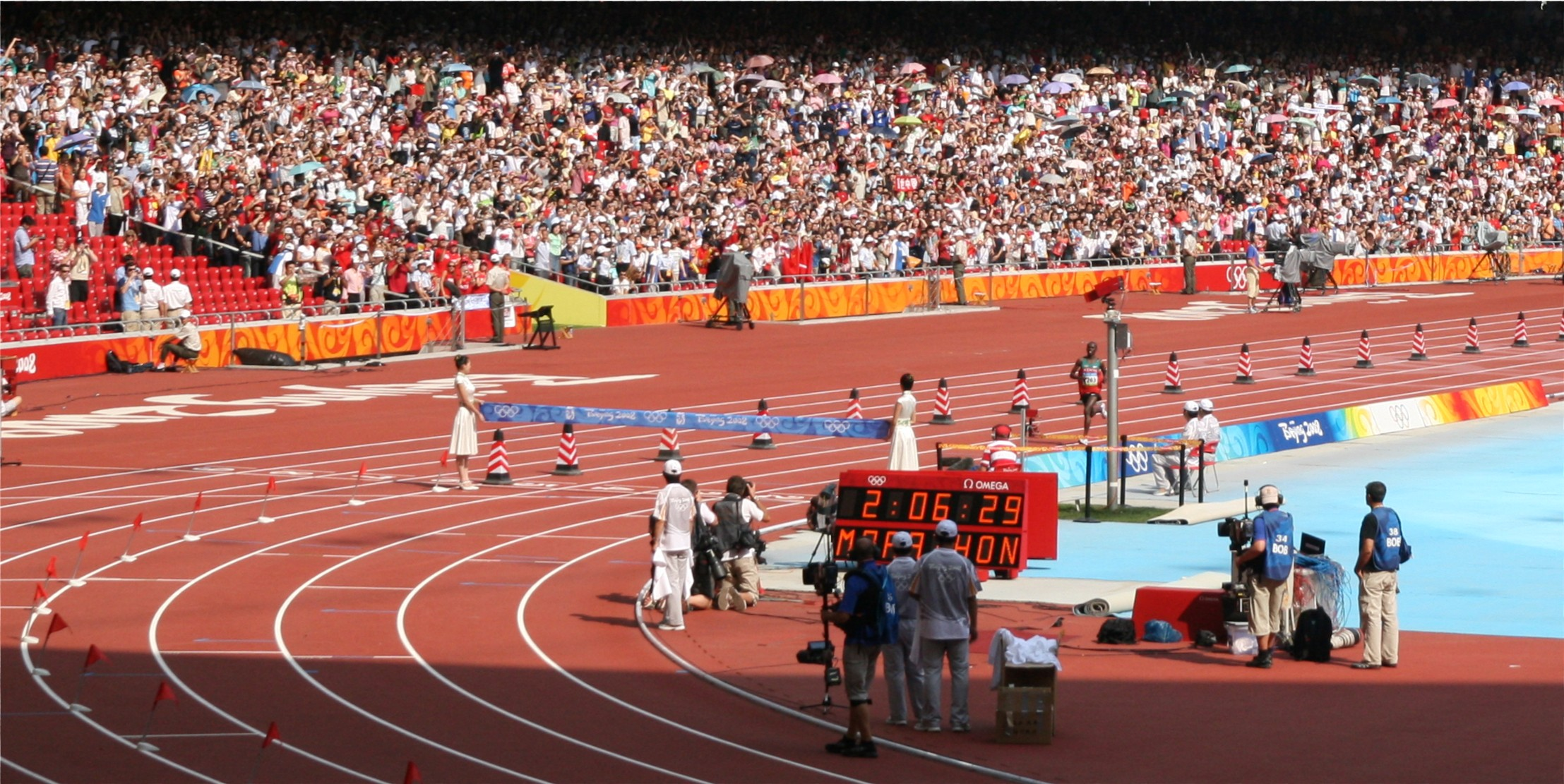
Wanjiru approaching the finishing line at the 2008 Summer Olympics

Wanjiru made his marathon debut at Fukuoka Marathon on 2 December 2007, winning it impressively with a course record of 2:06:39. He started 2008 by winning the Zayed International Half Marathon and receiving a prize of US$300,000. In the 2008 London Marathon, he came in second, breaking 2:06 for the first time. In the 2008 Summer Olympics, Wanjiru won the marathon gold medal in an Olympic record time of 2:06:32, smashing the previous record of 2:09:21 set by Carlos Lopes of Portugal in the 1984 Olympics. He received the AIMS World Athlete of the Year Award that year in recognition of his performances.

=== London and Chicago wins ===
At the Granollers Half Marathon in February 2008, in which Wanjiru won, the Kenyan stated his intent for the future, saying, "in five years' time I feel capable of clocking a sub 2 hours time for the marathon." In April 2009, Wanjiru won the London Marathon in a time of 2:05:10, a new personal record and also a new course record. He was pleased with the achievement and stated that he hoped to break Haile Gebrselassie's world record in the near future. At the Rotterdam Half Marathon, Wanjiru clocked a 1:01:08 on 13 September, which was won by Sammy Kitwara with a time of 58:58. In October 2009, Wanjiru won the Chicago Marathon in a time of 2:05:41, setting a new course record for the city and the fastest marathon time ever run in the United States. The wins in London and Chicago helped him reach the top of the World Marathon Majors rankings for 2009, earning him a jackpot of US$500,000.

He signed up to defend his title at the 2010 London Marathon, but he encountered knee trouble at the midway point of the race and decided to drop out to avoid further injury – the first time in six marathons that he had failed to finish. He chose to run at the 2010 Chicago Marathon in October, but a stomach virus before the race had hampered his preparations and he entered the competition with the lesser aim of reaching the top three. Tsegaye Kebede took the opportunity to forge a lead, but Wanjiru (despite a lack of peak physical form) persevered with the pace and caught up with the Ethiopian. He took the lead in the final 400 m to defend his title in Chicago with a time of 2:06:24. "It was the greatest surprise I have ever seen in my life", remarked his coach, Federico Rosa, on the performance.

== Personal life ==
Wanjiru married Mary Wacera, a fellow long-distance runner, in 2009 and the two had a child (Ann) in 2010. He had previously married Triza Njeri in a traditional ceremony and had two children, although Wanjiru and Wacera's marriage was legally binding.

Wanjiru began drinking alcohol when he moved to Japan, and it increased and became a major part of his life. Despite that, his marathoning career continued successfully, though his personal life became somewhat chaotic.

In December 2010, Wanjiru was arrested by Kenyan police at his house in Nyahururu and charged with threatening to kill his wife and illegally possessing an AK-47 rifle. He denied both the accusations and claimed that he was being framed.

Wanjiru and his wife Triza Njeri, a beautician, had a daughter Anne Wanjiru and a son Simon Njoroge. Wanjiru also had a third wife, Judy Wambui Wairimu, who was pregnant when he died and has since had a son.

Wanjiru's cousin Joseph Riri was a world-class marathon runner, and Wanjiru's younger brother Simon Njoroge was also a long-distance runner.

== Death ==
On 15 May 2011, Wanjiru died from a fall off a balcony at his home in Nyahururu. Wanjiru appeared to have suffered internal injuries after the fall and was confirmed dead by doctors at a nearby hospital after attempts to revive him failed.

Police said Wanjiru's wife, Triza Njeri, had come home to find him in bed with another woman. She locked the couple in the bedroom and ran outside. Wanjiru then died after falling from the balcony. Police were unsure if Wanjiru intended suicide or jumped out of rage, and investigated the circumstances related to Njeri and his female companion that led to his death.

In May 2017, while testifying during an inquest into Wanjiru's death, his mother Hannah Wanjiru said at the Milimani law court that she believes her son was murdered.

His mother claimed at an inquest into his death that her son was murdered by six men who had conspired with his wife Trizah Njeri. During the inquest at the Milimani court that sought to establish whether Wanjiru was murdered or jumped to his death, a former chief government pathologist said he was convinced that Wanjiru was hit by a blunt object after he had jumped from the balcony of his home, landing on his legs, or that he was possibly pushed and then struck.

== Achievements ==
Year	Competition	Venue	Position	Event	Notes
Representing Kenya
2005	Rotterdam Half Marathon	Rotterdam, Netherlands	1st	Half marathon	59:16 WR
2007	Ras Al Khaimah Half Marathon	Ras Al Khaimah, UAE	1st	Half marathon	58:53 WR
2007	City-Pier-City Half Marathon	The Hague, Netherlands	1st	Half marathon	58:33 WR
2007	Fukuoka Marathon	Fukuoka, Japan	1st	Marathon	2:06:39 CR
2008	London Marathon	London, United Kingdom	2nd	Marathon	2:05:24
2008	Summer Olympics	Beijing, China	1st	Marathon	2:06:32 OR
2009	London Marathon	London, United Kingdom	1st	Marathon	2:05:10 CR
2009	Chicago Marathon	Chicago, United States	1st	Marathon	2:05:41 CR
2010	Chicago Marathon	Chicago, United States	1st	Marathon	2:06:24

Awards

- 2005 Kenyan Most Promising Sportsman of the Year award.
- 2008 Kenyan Sportsman of the Year Award.

== Personal bests ==
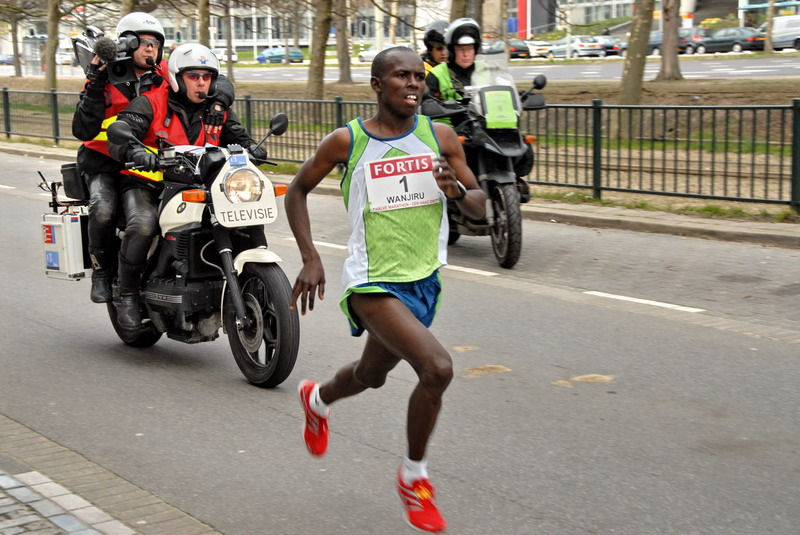
Samuel Wanjiru, breaking a world record in the 2007 Fortis City-Pier-City Half Marathon

Event	Time	Date	Location
5000 metres	13:12.40	29 April 2005	Hiroshima
10,000 metres	26:41.75†	26 August 2005	Brussels
20 kilometres	55:31‡	17 March 2007	The Hague
Half marathon	58:33	17 March 2007	The Hague
Marathon	2:05:10	26 April 2009	London

Most information taken from IAAF profile.

Key: † = World junior record, ‡ = Unofficial

Records
Preceded by (Kenya) Paul Tergat (Ethiopia) Haile Gebrselassie	Men's half marathon world record holder 11 September 2005 – 15 January 2006; 9 February 2007 – 21 March 2010	Succeeded by (Ethiopia) Haile Gebrselassie (Eritrea) Zersenay Tadese
Preceded by (Portugal) Carlos Lopes	Men's Marathon Olympic Record Holder; 24 August 2008 - present	Succeeded by Incumbent
Sporting positions
Preceded by (Kenya) Robert Kipkoech Cheruiyot	Rotterdam men's half marathon winner 2005	Succeeded by (Eritrea) Zersenay Tadese
Preceded by (Ethiopia) Haile Gebrselassie	Men's half marathon best year performance 2007	Succeeded by Shared between (Ethiopia) Haile Gebrselassie & (Ethiopia) Deriba Merga
Awards and achievements
Preceded by Jason Dunford	Kenyan Sportsman of the Year; 2008	Succeeded by Collins Injera
