= Benson Masya =

Kenyan runner

Benson Masya (May 14, 1970 – September 24, 2003) was a Kenyan long-distance runner and marathon specialist, who competed in the late 1980s and 1990s. He participated at the inaugural IAAF World Half Marathon Championships in 1992 and finished in first place.

== Overview ==
Masya was a Kamba by ethnicity.

Initially he was a boxer attached to Kenyan postal service before concentrating on running. He won the Great North Run a record four times; in 1991, 1992, 1994 and 1996. He also won the City-Pier-City Loop half marathon in the Hague twice in 1993 and 1994.

His career as a top runner came to a premature end. The Portsmouth 10 Mile race in 1996 was among his last notable achievements. His reveller lifestyle may have contributed to deteriorating performances.

== Death ==
Masya died in September 2003, aged 33, after a period of illness. At his death, he was accompanied by his friend Cosmas Ndeti. Masya was buried in Kitui.

== Achievements ==
Year	Competition	Venue	Position	Event	Notes
Representing Kenya
1991	Honolulu Marathon	Honolulu, Hawaii	1st	Marathon	2:18:24
1992	World Half Marathon Championships	Newcastle, United Kingdom	1st	Half marathon	1:00:24
1992	Honolulu Marathon	Honolulu, Hawaii	1st	Marathon	2:14:19
1993	City-Pier-City Loop	The Hague, Netherlands	1st	Half Marathon	1:00:24
1994	City-Pier-City Loop	The Hague, Netherlands	1st	Half Marathon	1:02:00
1994	Honolulu Marathon	Honolulu, Hawaii	1st	Marathon	2:15:04
1997	Stockholm Marathon	Stockholm, Sweden	1st	Marathon	2:17:22

Sporting positions
Preceded by Lawrence Peu; Moses Tanui	Men's Half Marathon Best Year Performance; 1992; 1994	Succeeded by Moses Tanui; Simon Lopuyet
