= 2013 Berlin Marathon =

Marathon race held in Berlin

40th Berlin Marathon
- 2013 Berlin Marathon logo
- Venue: Berlin, Germany
- Dates: 29 September

Champions
- Men: Wilson Kipsang (2:03:23 WR)
- Women: Florence Kiplagat (2:21:13)

The 2013 Berlin Marathon was the 40th edition of the Berlin Marathon, held in Berlin, Germany. It took place on Sunday, 29 September. The race was sponsored by BMW, being officially titled the BMW Berlin Marathon.

The men's race was won by Wilson Kipsang of Kenya in a world record time of 2:03:23.

The women's race was won by Florence Kiplagat of Kenya in a time of 2:21:13.

The 20th-place finisher in the men's race, Miguel Ángel Gamonal, tested positive for Clenbuterol and was disqualified and banned for two years.

Although Kipsang's world record was the major historical event of the race, it later became notable for being Eliud Kipchoge's only loss at the marathon distance in an otherwise spotless competitive record spanning 2013 to 2019. His next loss did not occur until the 2020 London Marathon.

== Results ==
=== Men ===
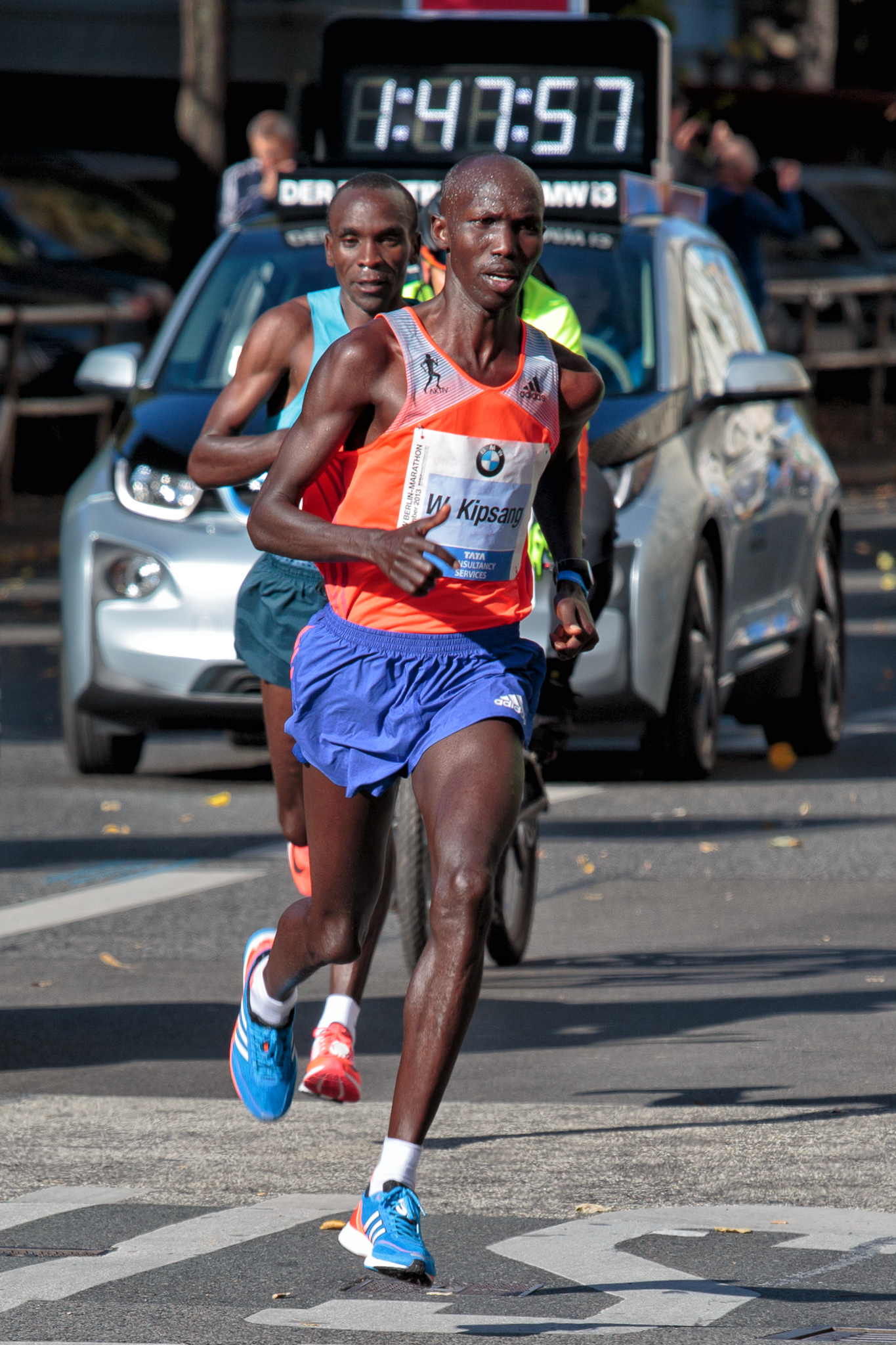
Wilson Kipsang

Position	Athlete	Nationality	Time
1st place, gold medalist(s)	Wilson Kipsang	Kenya	2:03:23 WR
2nd place, silver medalist(s)	Eliud Kipchoge	Kenya	2:04:05
3rd place, bronze medalist(s)	Geoffrey Kipsang	Kenya	2:06:26
4	Stephen Kwelio Chemlany	Kenya	2:07:44
5	Maswai Kiptanui	Kenya	2:08:52
6	Marílson Gomes dos Santos	Brazil	2:09:24
7	Suehiro Ishikawa	Japan	2:10:24
8	Koji Kobayashi	Japan	2:11:31
9	Rui Silva	Portugal	2:12:16
10	Sisay Jisa	Ethiopia	2:12:17

=== Women ===
Position	Athlete	Nationality	Time
1st place, gold medalist(s)	Florence Kiplagat	Kenya	2:21:13
2nd place, silver medalist(s)	Sharon Cherop	Kenya	2:22:28
3rd place, bronze medalist(s)	Irina Mikitenko	Germany	2:24:54
4	Helah Kiprop	Kenya	2:28:02
5	Desiree Davila	United States	2:29:15
6	Vianey de la Rosa	Mexico	2:32:35
7	Eri Hayakawa	Japan	2:32:35
8	Nina Stöcker	Germany	2:37:46
9	Lizzi Lee	Ireland	2:38:09
10	Maria Yolanda Gutierrez	Spain	2:38:18
