= World's Best 10K =

Running race held in Puerto Rico

- Official race logo
- Date: Late February
- Location: San Juan, Puerto Rico
- Event type: Road
- Distance: 10 kilometers
- Established: 1998
- Website: World's Best 10K
- Participants: 9,000

The World's Best 10K (WB10K) was a road race of 10 kilometers celebrated in San Juan, Puerto Rico every year. It is certified by the Association of International Marathons and Road Races (AIMS) and by the International Amateur Athletic Federation (IAAF). The event was also the first race transmitted live through the Internet, with audio, video and results.

WB10K was ranked among the 20 most competitive races in the world. In 2003, Paula Radcliffe of England completed the course in a world record time of 30 minutes 21 seconds. The men's race at the 2010 edition, won by Rigoberto Gaetán, had six runners break the 28 minute mark. Lornah Kiplagat has been the race's most successful competitor as she has won the women's race on six occasions.

The race was first held in 1998, when it was known as the Puente Teodoro Moscoso 10 km. The competition changed to its current title in 2000.

The final edition of World's Best 10K was held in 2017.

== Prizes ==
- World best record: $100,000 USD
- First place: US$25,000 with a US$10,000 bonus for men under 28 minutes and women under 31 minutes.

== Past winners ==
Key: Course record

Edition	Year	Men's winner	Time (m:s)	Women's winner	Time (m:s)
1st	1998	Jacinto Rodríguez (PUR)	?	Sandra Arroyo (PUR)	?
2nd	1999	Jacinto Rodríguez (PUR)	?	Daisy Ocasio (PUR)	?
3rd	2000	Khalid Khannouchi (MAR)	28:35	Tegla Loroupe (KEN)	31:30
4th	2001	Paul Tergat (KEN)	28:25	Lornah Kiplagat (KEN)	31:37
5th	2002	Hendrick Ramaala (RSA)	28:15	Paula Radcliffe (GBR)	30:43
6th	2003	Hendrick Ramaala (RSA)	28:15.4	Paula Radcliffe (GBR)	30:21.0 WR
7th	2004	John Korir (KEN)	27:46.7	Lornah Kiplagat (NED)	30:40.6
8th	2005	John Korir (KEN)	27:55.8	Lornah Kiplagat (NED)	32:11.6
9th	2006	Wilson Kebenei (KEN)	27:43.9	Lornah Kiplagat (NED)	30:49.4
10th	2007	Gilbert Okari (KEN)	28:08	Lornah Kiplagat (NED)	31:05
11th	2008	Deriba Merga (ETH)	28:03	Lornah Kiplagat (NED)	31:02
12th	2009	Sammy Kitwara (KEN)	27:25.6	Vivian Cheruiyot (KEN)	31:11.7
13th	2010	Moses Masai (KEN)	27:19	Vivian Cheruiyot (KEN)	31:07
14th	2011	Sammy Kitwara (KEN)	27:35	Sentayehu Ejigu (ETH)	31:50
15th	2012	Sammy Kitwara (KEN)	28:05	Vivian Cheruiyot (KEN)	30:47
16th	2013	Sammy Kitwara (KEN)	28:42	Joyce Chepkirui (KEN)	31:40
17th	2014	Bedan Karoki (KEN)	28:35	Mary Wacera (KEN)	32:06
18th	2015	Sammy Kitwara (KEN)	28:51	Belaynesh Oljira (ETH)	31:57
19th	2016	Bedan Karoki (KEN)	27:42	Mary Wacera (KEN)	31:49
20th	2017	Sam Chelanga (USA)	28:19	Mary Wacera (KEN)	31:41
—	2018	Was not held			

== See also ==
- Sports in Puerto Rico
