= Route du Vin Half Marathon =

Road running event in Luxembourg

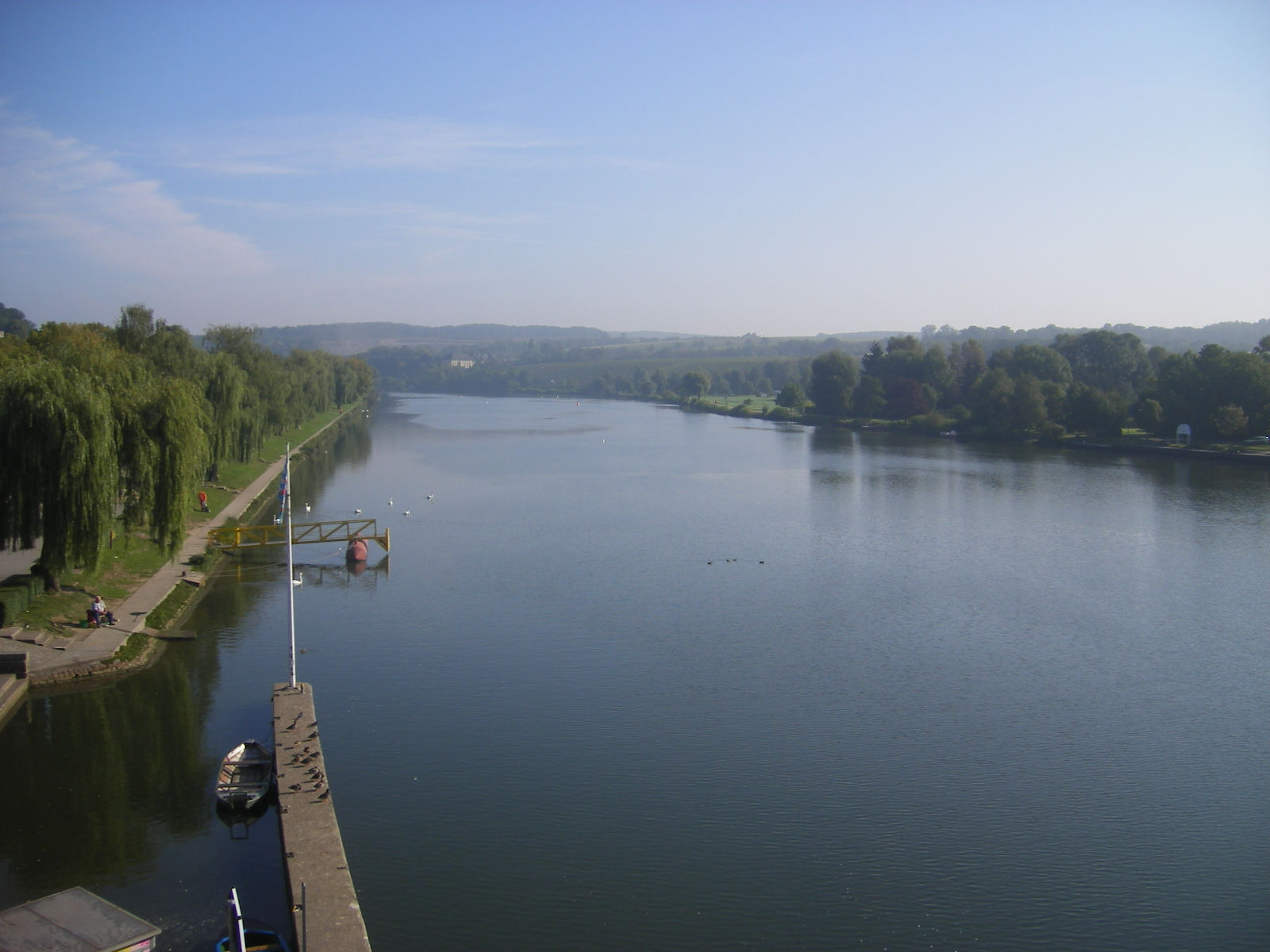
- The Moselle River, which the race course is set alongside
- Date: Late September
- Location: Remich, Luxembourg
- Event type: Road
- Distance: Half marathon
- Primary sponsor: ING
- Established: 1962
- Course records: Men's: 59:56 (2010) (Kenya) Leonard Langat; Women's: 1:09:22 (2004) (Slovenia) Helena Javornik
- Website: Official website
- Participants: 1,301 (2019)

The ING Route du Vin Half Marathon (French: ING Route du Vin Semi-Marathon) is an annual road running competition over the half marathon distance (21.1 km/13.1 mi) which takes place in late September in Remich, Luxembourg. It is organised by the Luxembourg Athletics Federation and it is a member race of the Association of International Marathons and Distance Races. It is sponsored by ING Luxembourg.

Established in 1962, the name for the competition stems from the region's wine-making tradition (Route du Vin being the French for Wine Route). The race has had a number of different courses. In the early life of the race the course began in Schengen and finished in Wormeldange. This changed in 1975 to begin in Remich and end at Grevenmacher. The current course (with a start and finish in Remich) was first put to use in 2000. The distance of the race has also varied: it was not reliably measured for the half marathon distance until 1995. The first four editions were too long, as was the 1972 race. From 1966 to 1979, the courses were generally short and from 1979 to 1999 the times run on the course were aided by an overall downhill elevation. Since 2000, the times set on the course have been eligible for record making purposes. The course now follows a north–south loop alongside the left bank of the Moselle River and starts and ends near the centre of the town.

The race began as a men's only competition and women were first included in 1974. A total of 1358 runners took part in the event in 2013 (1062 men and 296 women). It is one of two major road running events in the country that attracts elite runners and a mass field, alongside the annual Luxembourg Marathon.

The 2009 women's winner, Shitaye Gemechu, was disqualified after testing positive for the banned blood booster EPO (making her the first Ethiopian runner to be banned for abusing that substance).

== Past winners ==
Key: Course record Non-half marathon (or aided) distance

| Edition | Year | Men's winner | Time (h:m:s) | Women's winner | Time (h:m:s) |
|---|---|---|---|---|---|
| 1st | 1962 | Jean Aniset (LUX) | 1:11:58a | Not held | |
| 2nd | 1963 | Gustav Disse (FRG) | 1:09:25a | Not held | |
| 3rd | 1964 | Karl-Heinz Paetow (FRG) | 1:17:02a | Not held | |
| 4th | 1965 | Aurèle Vandendriessche (BEL) | 1:07:12a | Not held | |
| 5th | 1966 | Aurèle Vandendriessche (BEL) | 1:05:45a | Not held | |
| 6th | 1967 | Friedel Wiggershaus (FRG) | 1:04:17a | Not held | |
| 7th | 1968 | Alfons Ida (FRG) | 1:05:34a | Not held | |
| 8th | 1969 | Michael Rowland (GBR) | 1:04:16a | Not held | |
| 9th | 1970 | Kazimierz Podolak (POL) | 1:03:20a | Not held | |
| 10th | 1971 | Paul Angenvoorth (FRG) | 1:05:32a | Not held | |
| 11th | 1972 | Théo Bock (LUX) | 1:08:15a | Not held | |
| 12th | 1973 | Rolf Burscheid (FRG) | 1:05:42a | Not held | |
| 13th | 1974 | Edmundo Warnke (CHI) | 1:02:12a | Manuela Angenvoorth (FRG) | 1:22:18a |
| 14th | 1975 | Paul Angenvoorth (FRG) | 1:05:08a | Irene Rirang (FRG) | 1:25:01a |
| 15th | 1976 | Tom Fleming (USA) | 1:06:03a | Jeanny Mahnen (LUX) | 1:29:40a |
| 16th | 1977 | Paul Angenvoorth (FRG) | 1:01:22a | Manuela Angenvoorth (FRG) | 1:16:36a |
| 17th | 1978 | Jochen Schirmer (FRG) | 59:40a | Dorette Janssens (BEL) | 1:13:39a |
| 18th | 1979 | Ali Gammoudi (TUN) | 1:10:47a | Jeanny Mahnen (LUX) | 1:30:13a |
| 19th | 1980 | Justin Gloden (LUX) | 1:07:22a | Fernande Schmit (LUX) | 1:26:08a |
| 20th | 1981 | Martin Kuster (SUI) | 1:06:46a | Jeanny Mahnen (LUX) | 1:24:58a |
| 21st | 1982 | Martin Kuster (SUI) | 1:06:25a | Jeanny Mahnen (LUX) | 1:28:00a |
| 22nd | 1983 | Alex Hagelsteens (BEL) | 1:05:24a | Ingris Vanderheyden (BEL) | 1:28:14a |
| 23rd | 1984 | Alex Hagelsteens (BEL) | 1:01:21a | Marie-Christine Deurbroeck (BEL) | 1:14:03a |
| 24th | 1985 | Karel Lismont (BEL) | 1:04:39a | Marie-Christine Deurbroeck (BEL) | 1:20:47a |
| 25th | 1986 | Alex Hagelsteens (BEL) | 1:02:46a | Carla Beurskens (NED) | 1:08:56a |
| 26th | 1987 | Geert Deruddere (BEL) | 1:02:29a | Danièle Kaber (LUX) | 1:11:33a |
| 27th | 1988 | Kurt Stenzel (FRG) | 1:01:02a | Heather MacDuff (GBR) | 1:14:15a |
| 28th | 1989 | Alfredo Shahanga (TAN) | 1:02:47a | Rosa Mota (POR) | 1:10:36a |
| 29th | 1990 | Julius Korir (KEN) | 1:01:18a | Rosa Mota (POR) | 1:09:52a |
| 30th | 1991 | Julius Korir (KEN) | 1:00:31a | Rosa Mota (POR) | 1:09:56a |
| 31st | 1992 | Joseph Keino (KEN) | 1:03:55a | Nadezhda Wijenberg (NED) | 1:13:27a |
| 32nd | 1993 | Boay Akonay (TAN) | 1:01:12a | Angelina Kanana (KEN) | 1:10:00a |
| 33rd | 1994 | Julius Korir (KEN) | 1:01:28a | Tegla Loroupe (KEN) | 1:10:38a |
| 34th | 1995 | Tendai Chimusasa (ZIM) | 1:00:26a | Tegla Loroupe (KEN) | 1:08:12a |
| 35th | 1996 | Thomas Osano (KEN) | 1:00:44a | Tegla Loroupe (KEN) | 1:08:43a |
| 36th | 1997 | Joseph Chebet (KEN) | 1:00:53a | Tegla Loroupe (KEN) | 1:10:41a |
| 37th | 1998 | Sammy Korir (KEN) | 1:00:15a | Catherina McKiernan (IRL) | 1:08:54a |
| 38th | 1999 | Elijah Lagat (KEN) | 1:00:24a | Katrin Dörre (GER) | 1:09:34a |
| 39th | 2000 | Joseph Mereng (KEN) | 1:02:24 | Ikumi Nagayama (JPN) | 1:10:25 |
| 40th | 2001 | Paul Kipkemboi (KEN) | 1:03:05 | Luminita Zaituc (GER) | 1:11:04 |
| 41st | 2002 | Barnabas Kenduiywo (KEN) | 1:02:07 | Edith Masai (KEN) | 1:10:10 |
| 42nd | 2003 | Paul Kanda (KEN) | 1:02:36 | Restituta Joseph (TAN) | 1:09:42 |
| 43rd | 2004 | Moses Kigen (KEN) | 1:01:38 | Helena Javornik (SLO) | 1:09:22 |
| 44th | 2005 | Wilson Chebet (KEN) | 1:02:19 | Joan Aiyabei (KEN) | 1:12:36 |
| 45th | 2006 | Francis Larabal (KEN) | 1:00:29 | Anne Kosgei (KEN) | 1:11:47 |
| 46th | 2007 | Wilson Chebet (KEN) | 1:00:13 | Mary Ptikany (KEN) | 1:10:13 |
| 47th | 2008 | Charles Korir (KEN) | 1:02:09 | Mamitu Daska (ETH) | 1:12:36 |
| 48th | 2009 | John Mwangangi (KEN) | 1:00:36 | Eunice Kales (KEN) | 1:12:54 |
| 49th | 2010 | Leonard Langat (KEN) | 59:56 | Pauline Ngigi (KEN) | 1:11:17 |
| 50th | 2011 | Leonard Langat (KEN) | 1:01:07 | Abebech Afework (ETH) | 1:10:30 |
| 51st | 2012 | Richard Mengich (KEN) | 1:00:48 | Farida Chelegat (KEN) | 1:10:36 |
| 52nd | 2013 | Jackson Kibet (KEN) | 1:01:31 | Zinash Haile (ETH) | 1:12:41 |
| 53rd | 2014 | Peter Some (KEN) | 1:03:12 | Violah Jepchumba (KEN) | 1:13:20 |
| 54th | 2015 | Paul Kipkemoi (KEN) | 1:02:04 | Yeshi Chekole (ERI) | 1:12:17 |
| 55th | 2016 | Kalipus Lomwai (KEN) | 1:03:57 | Nancy Arusei (KEN) | 1:12:31 |
| 56th | 2017 | Mengistu Zelalem (ETH) | 1:02:37 | Penina Kandie (KEN) | 1:09:15 |
| 57th | 2018 | Dominic Mibei (KEN) | 1:04:07 | Tabitha Wambui (KEN) | 1:13:08 |
| 58th | 2019 | Joseph Mbatha (KEN) | 1:03:14 | Joyce Kiplimo (KEN) | 1:11:53 |
| 59th | 2022 | Lucas da Silva (BEL) | 1:04:27 | Jenny Gloden (LUX) | 1:18:45 |
| 60th | 2023 | Nicolas Schyns (BEL) | 1:03:54 | Juliette Thomas (BEL) | 1:13:56 |
| 61st | 2024 | Nicolas Schyns (BEL) | 1:03:13 | Juliette Thomas (BEL) | 1:13:38 |
