= Abebech Afework =

Ethiopian long-distance runner (born 1990)

Abebech Afework Bekele
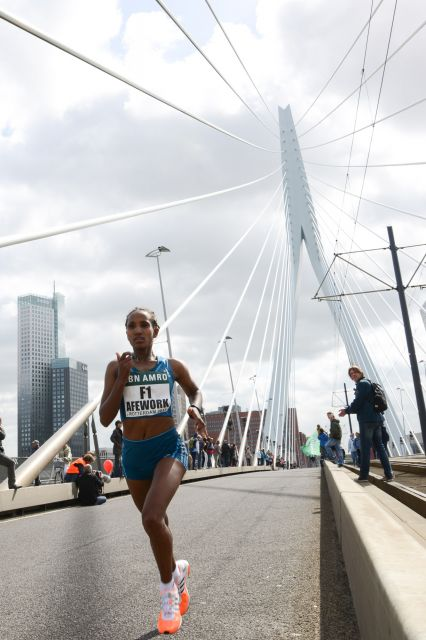
- During Rotterdam Marathon in 2014

Personal information
- Nationality: Ethiopian
- Born: December 11, 1990 (age 35) Ethiopia

Sport
- Sport: Athletics
- Event: Long-distance running
- Club: Ethiopian Defence

Achievements and titles
- Personal bests: 10,000 m – 31:48.53 (2012); * Half marathon – 1:10:30 (2011) * Marathon – 2:23:59 (2013)

Abebech Afework Bekele (born 11 December 1990) is an Ethiopian long-distance runner who specialises half marathon races. She has represented Ethiopia at the IAAF World Cross Country Championships and the IAAF World Half Marathon Championships. She was the 2011 winner of the Egmond Half Marathon. Her personal best for the distance is 1:10:30 hours.

She first began competing abroad in 2009, taking third at the Udine Half Marathon in a time of 1:11:15 hours and running a 10,000 metres best of 32:52.67 minutes in Utrecht. She also won the smaller Arezzo Half Marathon race that year. She had her first international call-ups the following year, coming 18th in the senior race at the 2010 IAAF World Cross Country Championships and 14th at the 2010 IAAF World Half Marathon Championships in Nanning. At the Zwolle Half Marathon she ran a personal best of 1:10:49 hours for the distance, coming in as runner-up behind Caroline Kilel. She was also runner-up at the Great Ethiopian Run at the end of the year, behind Sule Utura.

In January 2011, she won the Egmond Half Marathon Running for the Ethiopian Defence running club, she came fourth in the 10,000 m at the national championships then ran a personal best of 32:05.06 minutes at the Golden Spike Ostrava later that month. In September she turned back to the roads and came third at the Dam tot Damloop in Zaandam then won the Route du Vin Half Marathon in a personal best of 1:10:30 hours. She returned to the Great Ethiopian 10K in November and improved one place to take the title, beating established marathon runners in Tiki Gelana and Atsede Habtamu. She then defeated the reigning world marathon champion Edna Kiplagat to win at the Montferland Run 15K.

She placed sixth at the 2012 African Cross Country Championships and set a 10,000 metres best of 31:48.53 minutes at the Prefontaine Classic. In July, she placed third at the Bogotá Half Marathon. She failed to make it into the top five at either the Lille Half Marathon or Delhi Half Marathon. She opened 2013 with a marathon debut and managed eighth place at the fast Dubai Marathon, recording a time of 2:27:08 hours. She gave a better performance at the 2013 Rotterdam Marathon, placing second behind Jemima Sumgong with a time of 2:23:59 hours.
