= Anitha Jepchumba Kiptum =

Living people from Kenya

Anitha Jepchumba Kiptum (born 16 February 1981) is a Kenyan long-distance runner. She started competing professionally with IAAF in 1998 when she participated in the 1500 metres female competition in Nairobi on 10 May 1998. She won that race with a time of 4 minutes and 19.2 seconds, and later went on to participate in the 800 metres female outdoor competition in Kampala, Uganda, on 19 July of that year. She won that race with a finishing time of 2 minutes and 7.9 seconds.

== 800 metres ==
Kiptum participated in the 800 women's race in Uganda in 1998. The race took place on 19 July 1998 in Kampala, Uganda. She was the first to finish with a time of 2 minutes and 7.9 seconds.

== 1500 metres ==
On 10 May 1998, Kiptum competed in the Female 1,500 metre category D athletics in Nairobi, Kenya. She won that race in 4 minutes and 19.2 seconds. Two weeks later, she went on to participate in a similar competition in Florø Friidrettsfestival, Norway, in category E, where she placed 8th with a time of 4:37.12 seconds. Two and a half weeks later, she participated in the Tartu Memorial Gustav Sule in Estonia and finished 4th within 4 minutes and 20.5 seconds. On 4 July 1998, Kiptum competed in the Nairobi Kenya Championships and finished the race in 4 minutes and 17 seconds before competing again in Uganda, where she won the race with 4 minutes and 26 seconds.

In 2001, she participated in Keiyo competitions in Kenya and finished first with 4 minutes 34 seconds. In 2002, she participated in Norway at the Oslo competitions and emerged second with 4 minutes and 29 seconds.

After a 5-year hiatus, she returned on the truck in 2007 for the 16 June 2007 race at the Biberach Weltklasse race in Germany. She was the seventh to finish with a time of 4 minutes, 29.66 seconds. This would be her last race in this category.

== One mile ==
Anitha competed in her debut one mile race on 7 June 2007 in Heidelberg Cup competitions in Germany. She won this race with a time of 4 minutes and 47.46 seconds. This was followed by a better performance in Heidelberg Cup competitions in Germany, where she improved both her clock and position, finishing 2nd in 4 minutes 43.21 seconds.

== 3,000 metres ==
Anitha started participating in the 3,000 metres races competitively in 2002. She ran her first recorded race on 1 June 2002, in which she placed sixth in a time of 9 minutes and 21.91 seconds.

After a 6-year hiatus in this category, she returned on 18 May 2008 when she competed in the Pliezhausen Internationales Läufermeeting in Germany and finished first within 9 minutes and 16.25 seconds. This marked her last competition in the 3,000 metre race as her focus shifted to 5,000 and 10,000 meters.

== 5,000 metres ==
Anitha ran her first IAAF recorded 5,000 metres in 2002. On 13 June 2002, she participated in the Boras competitions in Sweden and won that race. Her time was 16 minutes and 19.46 seconds. She later participated in the Oslo ExxonMobil Bislett Games in Norway and performed dismally, finishing 17th in 16 minutes and 58.26 seconds. This would be her last race in. After this race, she went on a hiatus for 5 years, returning on the truck in 2007.

On 27 June 2007, Anitha participated in the Ostrava Golden Spike in Czech Republic. She was the 8th to finish the race and clocked 16:08.51. She would stop racing in this category for more than 10 years, returning in 1 December 2018, to set a personal best of 16.00 minutes.

== 10 kilometers ==
Her first 10 kilometers race was in September 2007 in Hamburg Alsterlauf, Germany, where she finished first, clocking 31 minutes and 11 seconds. This marked her significant shift from the shorter races to longer races. Overall, in 2008, she participated in five 10 kilometre races and won two of them. The first was the Oelder Sparkassen-City-Lauf competition, which she finished in 33 minutes and 11 seconds, whereas the second was Hamburg Alsterlauf competition, both of which were in Germany. She injured herself just before finishing a race in the Great Eastern Women in Singapore in 2008 in which she had a comfortable lead. This forced her to stumble through the finished line, and she was quickly taken away for medical attention soon thereafter. Nevertheless, she won this race ahead of Suzy Walsham and Fridah Chepkite Lodepa from Kenya

In 2009, Anitha ran two races within the 10 kilometre category. Her first race was in Brunssum Parelloop, The Netherlands, where she placed 3rd in a time of 33 minutes and 29 seconds, and her second was in Paderborn Internationaler Osterlauf, Germany, where she placed 9th in 35 minutes and 9 seconds.

== 15 kilometers ==
After registering positive performances throughout her participation in the 10 kilometer races Germany, Anitha graduated to the 15 kilometre race, debuting in the Kerzers Lauf competition in Switzerland. The result was a first place win with a clock of 52 minutes 54 seconds. When she took to the tracks again on 21 March 2009, Anitha finished 4th in 53 minutes and 43 seconds at the Kerzers Lauf competitions in Switzerland.

== Half marathon and marathon ==
On 28 September 2008, Anitha took part in the Remich Route du Vin half marathon in Luxembourg, where she placed second and recorded a time of 1:12:53.

After another break from professional competitions, Anitha returned in 2018 to take part in the Singapore Standard Chartered Marathon. She finished tenth in a time of 2 hours, 44 minutes and 33 seconds, creating a personal best.
