= Abera Kuma =

Ethiopian long-distance runner

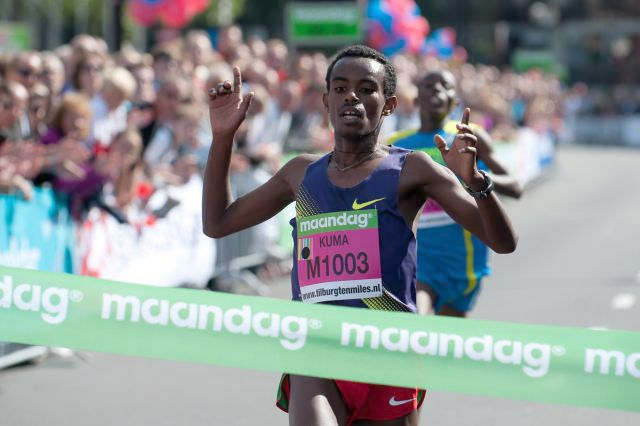
- Abera Kuma during the 2010 Asics Dutch 10K Championships

Personal information
- Nationality: Ethiopian
- Born: 31 August 1990 (age 35) Ambo, Ethiopia
Medal record
Representing Ethiopia
World Cross Country Championships
Bronze medal – third place	2010 Bydgoszcz	Senior team

Abera Kuma Lema (born 31 August 1990) is an Ethiopian long-distance runner, who competes in track, cross country, and road running events. An African junior champion over 5000 m, he won his first senior international medal (a team bronze) at the 2010 IAAF World Cross Country Championships.

He was disqualified at the 2011 event for fighting with Eritrea's Samuel Tsegay. Later that year, he won the 5000 m national title and was fifth at the 2011 World Championships in Athletics. His personal best in the event is 13:00.15 minutes.

== Career ==
Born in Ambo, Ethiopia, Kuma made his international debut at the 2007 World Youth Championships in Athletics, coming fifth in the 3000 m. He came fourth in the 5000 m at the 2009 senior national championships and won the gold medal at the 2009 African Junior Athletics Championships. He ran a personal best for the distance at the Memorial Van Damme in Brussels that September, clocking a time of 13:29.40 minutes. He came second at the Great Ethiopian Run 10K in Addis Ababa, finishing behind Tilahun Regassa, and was also the runner-up at the Lotto Cross Cup Brussels that year.

He gained selection for the Ethiopian national team with a third-place finish at the 2010 Ethiopian Cross Country Trials. At the 2010 IAAF World Cross Country Championships, the 19-year-old Abera was his country's second-best performing athlete, coming in sixteenth place and sharing the team bronze medal. He made his debut on the Diamond League track circuit a few months later and improved his 5000 m best to 13:07.83 minutes at the Golden Gala meet. He competed on the Dutch road running circuit towards the end of the year, coming second at the Jever Fun Lauf 10-miler in Schortens, winning the Tilburg 10K, and placing second to a world record-breaking Leonard Komon at the Zevenheuvelenloop 15K race.

The following year he was in the top five of the Cross Internacional de Itálica and the Jan Meda Cross Country, thus gaining selection for the 2011 IAAF World Cross Country Championships. His performance at the competition attracted much attention as he and Eritrea's Samuel Tsegay engaged in a fight on the final stretch, reflecting the history of antipathy between the nations. Tsegay, who accused the Ethiopian of deliberately elbowing him and standing on his heels from behind, took hold of Abera's leg and threw a punch before dashing to the finish. The IAAF disqualified both athletes for their conduct. The video of the fight was widely seen on the internet, attracting hundreds of thousands of views on YouTube. Returning to the track, he won his first national title in the 5000 m and his finishing time of 13:40.0 min was the third fastest ever recorded at the Addis Ababa Stadium. He ran a personal best (13:00.15 min) at the Golden Gala for a second year running, then set a 10,000 metres best of 27:22.54 min at the Prefontaine Classic. As the national champion, he was chosen to compete at the 2011 World Championships in Athletics. He led the pace for much of the 5000 m final but fell behind on the last lap to finish in sixth place (upgraded to fifth after Imane Merga was disqualified.)

Abera set a series of personal bests in 2012. He ran 7:39.09 minutes for the 3000 metres at the XL Galan, timed 27:18.39 minutes for the 10,000 m, recorded 45:28 minutes for third at the Dam tot Damloop and was runner-up at the Great Birmingham Run with a half marathon best of 60:19 minutes. He opened 2013 with a win at the Egmond Half Marathon. Abera finished third at the 2014 BMW Berlin Marathon with a time of 2.05:56.

In 2015, he won the Rotterdam Marathon in a time of 2.06:47.
