= Joseph Keino =

Kenyan long-distance runner

- Born: 1963 (age 62–63)
- Occupation: Long-distance runner (retired)
- Known for: 1992 IAAF World Half Marathon Championships

Joseph Keino (born 1963) is a retired Kenyan long-distance runner. He represented his country at the inaugural 1992 IAAF World Half Marathon Championships, where he came fifth and won the team gold medal with Kenya.

In 1991 he ran his half marathon career best of 1:00.33 hours in Grevenmacher, taking second place at the race. He won the 1991 Dam tot Damloop 10-miler and his time of 46:05 minutes for the distance was the fastest by any athlete in the world that year. In the same year as his IAAF World Half Marathon medal performance, he won the Egmond Half Marathon (two seconds off Marti ten Kate's course record) and the Route du Vin Half Marathon. He also had a runner-up finish at the Zevenheuvelenloop. In 1993 he ran an all-comers record for the 10K in Belfast, Northern Ireland, setting a new record time of 28:26 minutes.
