= Marja Wokke =

Dutch long-distance runner

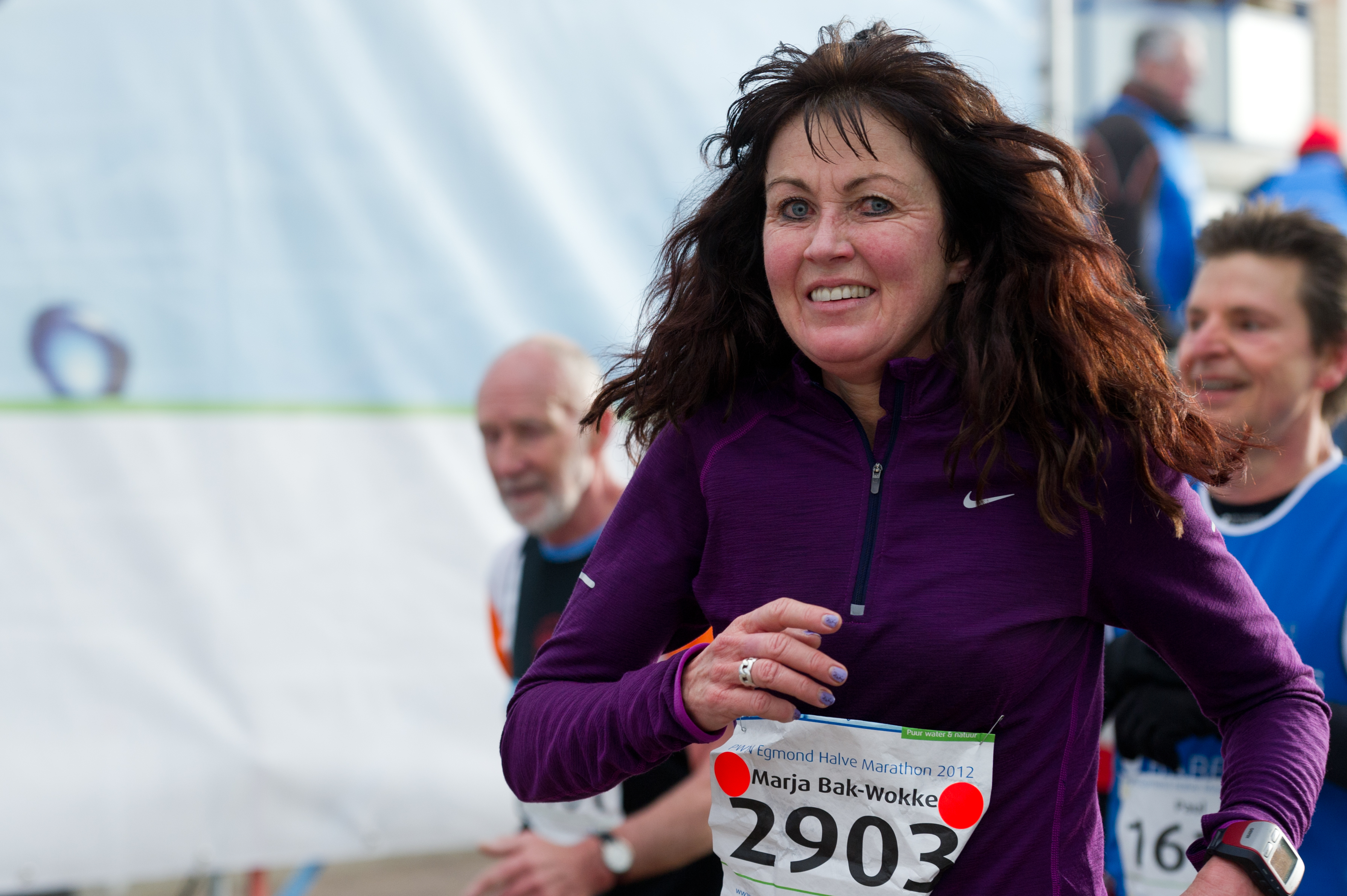
- Marja Wokke during the Egmond Half Marathon in 2012

Personal information
- Born: 21 March 1957 (age 68) Bergen, North Holland, Netherlands

Sport
- Country: Netherlands
- Sport: Road running
- Event(s): Half marathon, marathon

Marja Wokke (Dutch: [ˈmɑrjaː ˈʋɔkə]; born 21 March 1957) is a Dutch former marathon runner, most active in the 1970s and 1980s.

== Biography ==
=== 1980 ===
In 1980, Wokke won the City-Pier-City Loop half marathon in the Hague, when the race had a women's category for the first time. At this occasion she set a new world record time of 1:13:59.

That year, she also finished as first woman and 53th runner overall in the Amsterdam Marathon in a women's course record of 2:40:15.

She was ranked fifth in the world in 1980 with her best ever performance (2:32:28), which she ran in Eugene, Oregon.

=== 1981 ===
In 1981, Wokke finished as first woman again and 28th overall in the Amsterdam Marathon in 2:43:38.

She went on to win the inaugural Rotterdam Marathon on 23 May 1981, clocking in at 2:43:23.

== Achievements ==
Year	Competition	Venue	Position	Event	Notes
Representing the Netherlands
1978	Egmond Half Marathon	Egmond, Netherlands	1st	Half Marathon	1:19:45
1979	Egmond Half Marathon	Egmond, Netherlands	1st	Half Marathon	1:27:55
1980	Egmond Half Marathon	Egmond, Netherlands	1st	Half Marathon	1:19:35
1980	City-Pier-City Loop	The Hague, Netherlands	1st	Half Marathon	1:13:59
1980	Amsterdam Marathon	Amsterdam, Netherlands	1st	Marathon	2:40:15
1981	Egmond Half Marathon	Egmond, Netherlands	1st	Half Marathon	1:21:21
1981	Rotterdam Marathon	Rotterdam, Netherlands	1st	Marathon	2:43:23
1981	Amsterdam Marathon	Amsterdam, Netherlands	1st	Marathon	2:43:38

Records
Preceded by (United States) Patti Catalano	Women's Half marathon World record holder 29 March 1980 – 18 January 1981	Succeeded by (United States) Joan Benoit
Sporting positions
Preceded by (Netherlands) Corrie Konings	Egmond Women's Half Marathon Winner; 1978 – 1981	Succeeded by (Norway) Ingrid Kristiansen
