= Montferland Run =

Pfixx Solar Montferland Run is an annual 15-kilometres road running competition held in 's-Heerenberg, Montferland, Netherlands. It was first organised in 1996 and typically takes place on the first Sunday in December.

Unlike many elite level road races, the course for the Montferland Run is a difficult, hilly one which does not easily allow for internationally fast times. The start and finish point of the race is in the old town area of 's-Heerenberg. The course has traces a circuit through the Montferland Forest and passes the small, nearby villages of Stokkum, Beek and Zeddam. The race includes both elite athlete and fun runners, and there is also a shorter 7.5 km race. In order to preserve the surrounding environment and retain the character of the races, the competition is limited to 3500 entries per year.

The Montferland Run is one of the fastest 15 km races in the world. Many top national and international athletes have competed in ’s-Heerenberg, including: Kamiel Maase, Abdi Nageeye, Bashir Abdi, Khalid Khannouchi, Kenenisa Bekele, Abel Kirui, Geoffrey Mutai, Wilson Kipsang, Stephen Kiprotich, Dennis Kimetto, Conseslus Kipruto, Sabastian Sawe, Constantina Dita, Edna Kiplagat, Sifan Hassan, Lornah Kiplagat, Meseret Defar, Amane Beriso and of course Haile Gebrselassie and Paula Radcliffe.

The course records for the 15 km race are held by East African athletes: Geoffrey Koech of Kenya ran the men's record of 42:13 minutes in 2019 and Ethiopian Tsigie Gebreselama's run of 47:29 minutes in 2019 is the best women's time. She ran a new world best time U20

The course was previously sponsored by the Wincanton Group and its current sponsor (since 2012) is Pfixx Solar.

== Past winners ==
Key: Course record

Edition	Year	Men's winner	Nationality	Time (m:s)	Women's winner	Nationality	Time (m:s)
25nd	2023	Sabastian Sawe	Kenya	42:35	Medina Eisa	Ethiopia	47:40
24nd	2019	Geoffrey Koech	Kenya	42:13	Tsigie Gebreselama	Ethiopia	47:29
23nd	2018	Stephen Kissa	Uganda	43:21	Joan Chelimo	Kenya	48:44
22nd	2017	Victor Chumo	Kenya	43:23	Mary Munanu	Kenya	49:08
21st	2016	Herpasa Negasa	Ethiopia	43:02	Eunice Kirwa	Bahrain	48:37
20th	2015	Abraham Cheroben	Kenya	42:54	Meseret Defar	Ethiopia	50:03
19th	2014	Hiskel Tewelde	Eritrea	43:26	Askale Merachi	Ethiopia	50:42
18th	2013	Patrick Ereng	Kenya	43:00	Cynthia Kosgei	Ethiopia	49:45
17th	2012	Geoffrey Mutai	Kenya	42:25	Atsede Baysa	Ethiopia	49:15
16th	2011	Philip Langat	Kenya	42:34	Abebech Afework	Ethiopia	49:19
15th	2010	Cancelled due to bad weather					
14th	2009	Nicholas Manza	Kenya	42:38	Caroline Kilel	Kenya	49:57
13th	2008	Dereje Tesfaye	Ethiopia	43:27	Lornah Kiplagat	Netherlands	48:49
12th	2007	Haile Gebrselassie	Ethiopia	42:36	Deriba Alemu	Ethiopia	48:50
11th	2006	Deriba Merga	Ethiopia	42:48	Hilda Kibet	Kenya	51:50
10th	2005	Hailu Mekonnen	Ethiopia	43:09	Bezunesh Bekele	Ethiopia	48:32
9th	2004	Tadesse Feyissa	Ethiopia	43:28	Bezunesh Bekele	Ethiopia	48:35
8th	2003	Richard Yatich	Kenya	43:20	Ayelech Worku	Ethiopia	50:58
7th	2002	William Kipsang	Kenya	44:33	Restituta Joseph	Tanzania	51:15
6th	2001	Kenenisa Bekele	Ethiopia	42:42	Sandra Van Den Haesevelde	Belgium	52:15
5th	2000	Kenenisa Bekele	Ethiopia	43:09	Irma Heeren	Netherlands	51:03
4th	1999	Felix Limo	Kenya	44:08	Nadezhda Wijenberg	Netherlands	50:59
3rd	1998	Tesfaye Tola	Ethiopia	44:05	Mieke Pullen	Netherlands	54:50
2nd	1997	Fransua Woldemariam	Ethiopia	45:06	Mieke Pullen	Netherlands	53:03
1st	1996	Michiel Otten	Netherlands	44:54	Isabelle Heusinkveld	Netherlands	57:02

== See also ==
- Zevenheuvelenloop, another prominent 15K race in the Netherlands
