= Egmond Half Marathon =

Annual half marathon race in the Netherlands

- Date: early January
- Location: Egmond aan Zee, Netherlands
- Event type: Road running
- Distance: Half marathon
- Primary sponsor: Nationale-Nederlanden
- Course records: Men: 1:00:46 (2012) (Ethiopia) Dawit Wolde; Women: 1:10:36 (2001) (Kenya) Susan Chepkemei
- Website: Egmond Half Marathon
- Participants: 713 (2020); 768 (2019)

The Egmond Half Marathon (Dutch: Egmond Halve Marathon) is an annual half marathon race over 21.1 kilometres that has been staged in Egmond aan Zee, Netherlands since 1973. The competition normally takes place in early January. Sections of the road race cross along the beach and sand dunes of the village, situated on the North Sea coast. The 2010 edition of the race was cancelled due to poor weather conditions, marking the first break in the race's history.

In addition to the elite level races, the event features recreational fun runs for the public, including a team race for friends or colleagues. The first editions of the event attracted around 1000 runners – a number which increased to over 5000 runners by the mid-1980s. A record 10,370 participants competed in 2000 and the race continued to grow in popularity, attracting over 16,500 people for the 2009 edition. A quarter marathon is also held annually and starts several hours before the half marathon.

The day before the race, the Egmond-pier-Egmond cycling race is organised; there is a combined classification result with the half marathon.

The event is organised by Le Champion – a Dutch running club which also organises the Dam tot Damloop and Zandvoort Circuit Run, among other races.

== Winners ==
Key: Course record Course was roughly 100 m short

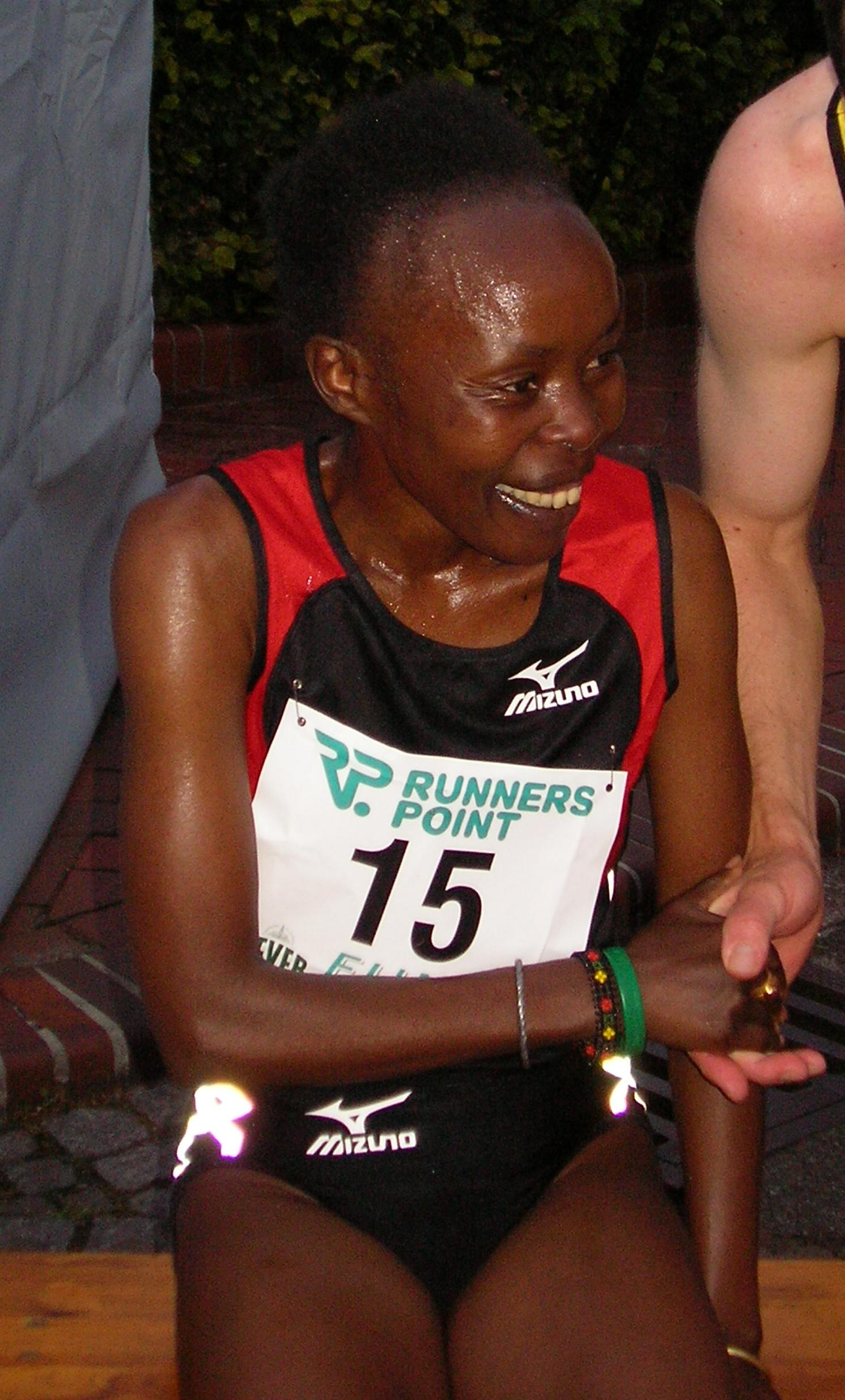
Kenyan Tegla Loroupe won six times consecutively from 1993 to 1998.

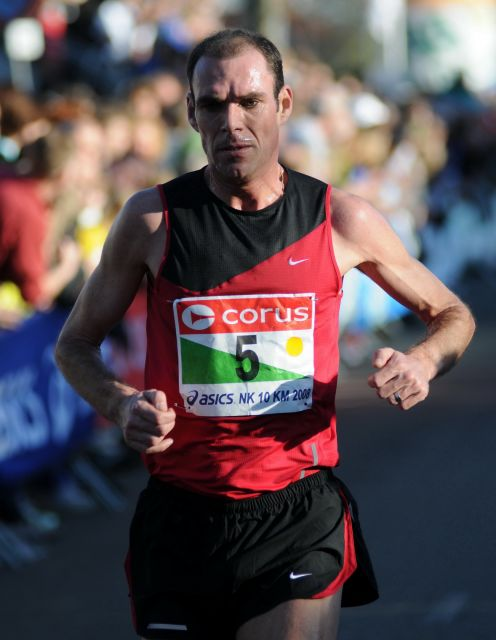
Dutch runner Greg van Hest won in 1999 but the course was considered short.

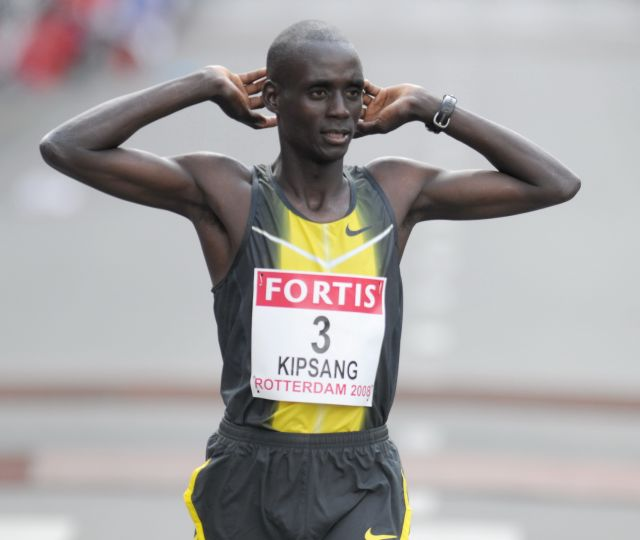
The 2004 winner William Kipsang has also won the Amsterdam Marathon.

Edition	Date	Men's winner	Time (h:m:s)	Women's winner	Time (h:m:s)
1st	March 11, 1973	Joop Smit (NED)	1:14:15	Plonie Scheringa (NED)	1:40:00
2nd	January 13, 1974	Geert Jansen (NED)	1:14:12	Quirien Kossen (NED)	1:41:40
3rd	January 12, 1975	Johan Kijne (NED)	1:11:15	Hennie Visserman (NED)	1:38:00
4th	January 11, 1976	Barry Kneppers (NED)	1:11:46	Corrie Konings (NED)	1:26:00
5th	January 8, 1977	Theo Geutjes (NED)	1:08:40	Corrie Konings (NED)	1:24:00
6th	January 8, 1978	Theo Verbeek (NED)	1:06:25	Marja Wokke (NED)	1:19:45
7th	January 7, 1979	Gerard Tebroke (NED)	1:15:50	Marja Wokke (NED)	1:27:55
8th	January 6, 1980	Gerard Mentink (NED)	1:07:03	Marja Wokke (NED)	1:19:35
9th	January 4, 1981	Steve Kenyon (ENG)	1:08:03	Marja Wokke (NED)	1:21:21
10th	January 10, 1982	Alex Hagelsteens (BEL)	1:06:59	Ingrid Kristiansen (NOR)	1:17:06
11th	January 9, 1983	Marti ten Kate (NED)	1:06:45	Annie van Stiphout (BEL)	1:21:30
12th	January 8, 1984	Alex Hagelsteens (BEL)	1:06:37	Francine Peeters (BEL)	1:18:20
13th	January 6, 1985	Peter Rusman (NED)	1:10:21	Wilma Rusman (NED)	1:22:21
14th	January 12, 1986	Henrik Jørgensen (DEN)	1:07:07	Carla Beurskens (NED)	1:18:16
15th	January 11, 1987	Michael Bishop (WAL)	1:05:11	Magda Ilands (BEL)	1:19:30
16th	January 10, 1988	Marti ten Kate (NED)	1:03:26	Kersti Jacobsen (DEN)	1:14:55
17th	January 8, 1989	Henrik Jørgensen (DEN)	1:05:28	Dorthe Rasmussen (DEN)	1:14:45
18th	January 10, 1990	Marti ten Kate (NED)	1:03:32	Carla Beurskens (NED)	1:13:25
19th	January 13, 1991	Tonnie Dirks (NED)	1:05:12	Alena Peterková (TCH)	1:15:03
20th	January 12, 1992	Joseph Keino (KEN)	1:03:38	Heléna Barócsi (HUN)	1:12:17
21st	January 10, 1993	Phillimon Hanneck (ZIM)	1:04:04	Tegla Loroupe (KEN)	1:10:41
22nd	January 2, 1994	John Kiprono (KEN)	1:04:47	Tegla Loroupe (KEN)	1:13:29
23rd	January 8, 1995	Getaneh Tessema (ETH)	1:03:56	Tegla Loroupe (KEN)	1:11:58
24th	January 14, 1996	Elijah Lagat (KEN)	1:03:09	Tegla Loroupe (KEN)	1:15:19
25th	January 12, 1997	John Kiprono (KEN)	1:05:07	Tegla Loroupe (KEN)	1:13:03
26th	January 11, 1998	Germán Silva (MEX)	1:03:08	Tegla Loroupe (KEN)	1:11:47
27th	January 10, 1999	Greg van Hest (NED)	1:01:19	Irma Heeren (NED)	1:10:03
28th	January 9, 2000	Wilson Kipkemboi (KEN)	1:02:41	Tegla Loroupe (KEN)	1:12:14
29th	January 14, 2001	Kamiel Maase (NED)	1:03:42	Susan Chepkemei (KEN)	1:10:36
30th	January 13, 2002	Wilson Kipkemboi (KEN)	1:02:40	Susan Chepkemei (KEN)	1:11:39
31st	January 12, 2003	Luc Krotwaar (NED)	1:03:43	Lornah Kiplagat (KEN)	1:12:29
32nd	January 11, 2004	William Kipsang (KEN)	1:04:51	Jane Ekimat (KEN)	1:17:41
33rd	January 9, 2005	Robert Chebor (KEN)	1:03:35	Hilda Kibet (KEN)	1:13:18
34th	January 8, 2006	Kamiel Maase (NED)	1:03:29	Susan Chepkemei (KEN)	1:12:16
35th	January 14, 2007	Eshetu Wondimu (ETH)	1:04:14	Hilda Kibet (KEN)	1:13:25
36th	January 13, 2008	Mulugeta Wami (ETH)	1:04:33	Shuru Deriba (ETH)	1:13:22
37th	January 11, 2009	Wilson Kipsang (KEN)	1:05:36	Workitu Ayanu (ETH)	1:16:33
	January 10, 2010	Not held due to bad weather			
38th	January 9, 2011	Ayele Abshero (ETH)	1:02:23	Abebech Afework (ETH)	1:12:53
39th	January 8, 2012	Dawit Wolde (ETH)	1:00:46	Meseret Hailu (ETH)	1:11:18
40th	January 13, 2013	Abera Kuma (ETH)	1:01:20	Helah Kiprop (KEN)	1:10:55
41st	January 12, 2014	Ayele Abshero (ETH)	1:02:52	Guteni Shone (ETH)	1:11:55
42nd	January 11, 2015	Azmeraw Mengistu (ETH)	1:03:01	Purity Rionoripo (KEN)	1:11:40
43rd	January 10, 2016	Yekeber Bayabel (ETH)	1:08:08	Genet Yalew (ETH)	1:19:02
44th	January 8, 2017	Dawit Wolde (ETH)	1:02:41	Desi Mokonin (BHR)	1:12:08
45th	January 14, 2018	Edwin Kiptoo (KEN)	1:02:36	Zeyneba Yimer (ETH)	1:12:19
46th	January 13, 2019	Ayele Abshero (ETH)	1:04:57	Haven Desse (ETH)	1:14:51
47th	January 12, 2020	Bashir Abdi (BEL)	1:08:23	Tsehay Gemechu (ETH)	1:20:29
	January 10, 2021	Not held due to covid			
	January 9, 2022	Not held due to covid			
48th	January 8, 2023	Soufiane Bouchikhi (BEL)	1:07:31	Nienke Brinkman (NED)	1:18:24
49th	January 14, 2024	Lucas Nieuweboer (NED)	1:03:34	Aminet Ahmed (ETH)	1:12:21
50th	January 12, 2025	Samuel Barata (POR)	1:02:10	Haven Hailu (ETH)	1:08:44
51th	January 11, 2026	Haymanot Alew (ETH)	1:03:09	Florence Niyonkuru (RWA)	1:10:37

== See also ==
- Rotterdam Half Marathon
