= Hilda Kibet =

Kenyan-Dutch runner (born 1981)

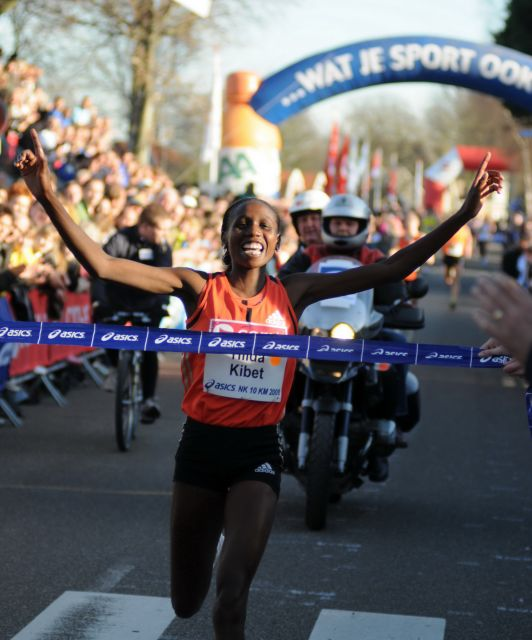
- Hilda Kibet winning her first Dutch title, Schoorl 2008

Personal information
- Full name: Hilda Kibet
- Born: 27 March 1981 (age 45) Keiyo District, Kenya
- Height: 1.66 m (5 ft 5 1/2 in)
- Weight: 45 kg (99 lb)

Achievements and titles
- Personal bests: 10 km – 31:01 (2008); 15 km – 48:03 (2010); 20 km – 1:05.12 (2010) half marathon – 1:08.39 (2010) marathon – 2:24.27 (2010)
Medal record
Women's athletics
Representing Netherlands
European Championships
Bronze medal – third place	2010 Barcelona	10,000 m
European Cross Country Championships
Gold medal – first place	2008 Brussels	Individual
- Updated on 18 October 2009

Hilda Kibet (born 27 March 1981 in Keiyo District) is a Dutch runner of Kenyan birth. She is the sister of Sylvia Kibet and the niece of Lornah Kiplagat. She obtained Dutch nationality in October 2007.

Kibet's longtime partner is Dutch marathon runner Hugo van den Broek. They split their time between Iten, Kenya and Castricum, in the Netherlands. Her cousin is fellow runner Lornah Kiplagat.

== Career ==
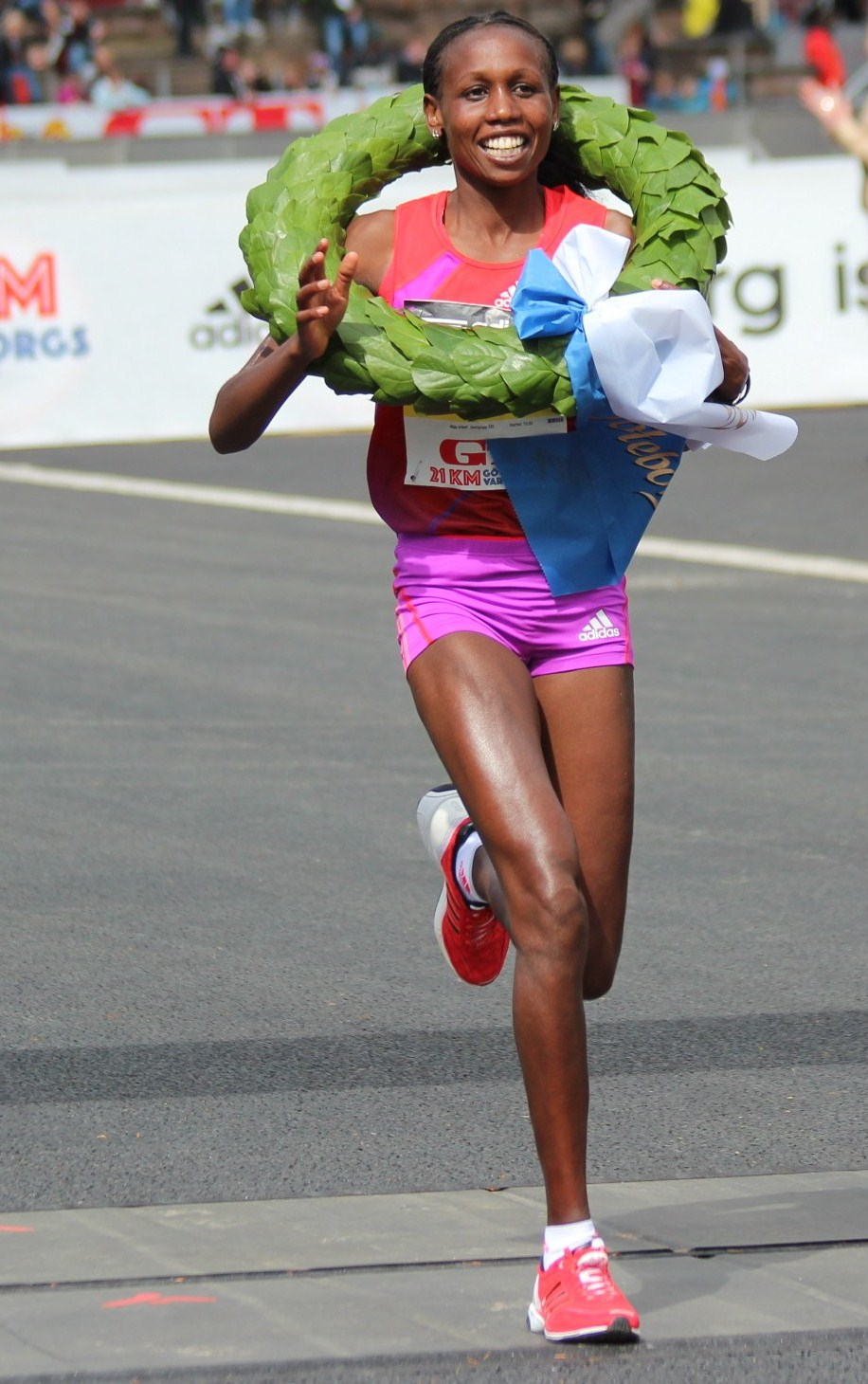
Hilda Kibet winning the 2012 Göteborgsvarvet in 1:09:27.

She won a series of road running competitions in 2007, including: the Egmond Half Marathon, New York City Half Marathon, City-Pier-City Loop, Parelloop and British 10km London Run. The following year she won the New York Mini 10K, succeeding her great-aunt Lornah Kiplagat, and made her Olympic debut at the 2008 Beijing Olympics, where she was fifteenth in the 10,000 metres. She won the women's title at the 2008 European Cross Country Championships at the end of the year.

She ran at the World 10K Bangalore in May 2009 and although she was one of the pre-race favourites, she finished fourth overall. She returned the following year, but only managed sixth place.

She opened 2010 with a personal best run of 1:08:39 at the RAK Half Marathon. Kibet was the sole runner selected to represent the Netherlands at the 2010 IAAF World Cross Country Championships and she finished in tenth place in the senior race. Later in the season she ran in the 10,000 m at the 2010 European Athletics Championships, but just missed out on the medals by finishing fourth behind Jéssica Augusto. She won the Dam tot Damloop in September 2010, running the fastest 10-mile time of the season (51:30), and beating her aunt Lornah Kiplagat. At the Frankfurt Marathon in October she ran a personal best time of 2:26:23, which was only enough for sixth in the quick race.

Her first race of 2011 was again the RAK Half Marathon, but she was a minute slower than the previous year and came sixth. She had a much better performance at the Rotterdam Marathon in April, where she came second with a personal best run of 2:24:27 hours just behind Philes Ongori. She was the first Dutch runner to finish at the Montferland Run in December, placing third overall.

Kibet attempted a third career win at the Egmond Half Marathon, but finished in third place. She claimed victory at the Göteborgsvarvet in May with a run of 1:09:27 hours, then came third at the New York Mini 10K a month later. She was chosen to run the marathon at the 2012 London Olympics and she managed 24th place with her time of 2:28:52 hours. Her season's best run came at the Turin Marathon, where she ran 2:25:46 as the runner-up behind Sharon Cherop, who broke the course record.

She set a new best for the half marathon with a run of 67:59 minutes for fourth at the Roma-Ostia Half Marathon in February 2013. She was the fastest athlete at the Rotterdam Marathon with her third-place finish in 2:26:42 hours.

== Career highlights ==
Dutch National Championships
2008 - Schoorl, 1st, 10 km

Other achievements
2004 - Groningen, 1st, 4 Mijl van Groningen
2004 - Brunssum, 1st, Parelloop
2005 - Breda, 1st, Bredase Singelloop
2005 - Manchester, 3rd, Great Manchester Run
2005 - Egmond aan Zee, 1st, Egmond Half Marathon
2006 - Tilburg, 2nd, Warandeloop
2006 - Groningen, 1st, 4 Mijl van Groningen
2006 - Egmond aan Zee, 2nd, Egmond Half Marathon
2007 - Egmond aan Zee, 1st, Egmond half marathon
2007 - The Hague, 1st, City-Pier-City Loop
2007 - Brunssum, 1st, Parelloop
2007 - London, 1st, British 10km London Run
2007 - New York City, 1st, New York City Half Marathon
2007 - Amsterdam – Zaandam, 2nd, Dam tot Damloop
2008 - Brussels, 1st, European Cross Country Championships
2008 - Montferland, 1st, Montferland Run
2009 - Amman, 6th, IAAF World Cross Country Championships
2009 - Amsterdam – Zaandam, 2nd, Dam tot Damloop
2009 - Amsterdam, 3rd, Amsterdam Marathon

== Personal bests ==
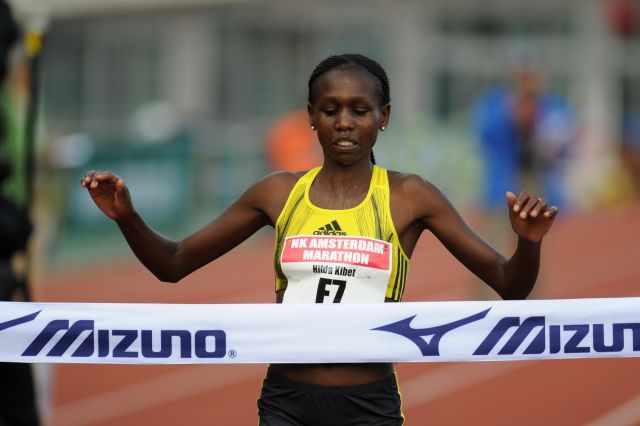
Kibet taking third at the 2009 Amsterdam Marathon.

Distance	Mark	Date	Location
10 km	31:01	10 February 2008	Schoorl, Netherlands
15 km	48:03	19 September 2010	Zaandam, Netherlands
10 miles	51:21	20 September 2009	Zaandam, Netherlands
20 km	1:05:12	19 February 2010	Ras Al Khaimah, UAE
Half marathon	1:07:59	3 March 2013	Roma-Ostia, Italy
Marathon	2:24:27	10 April 2011	Rotterdam, Netherlands
