= Carla Beurskens =

Dutch long-distance runner

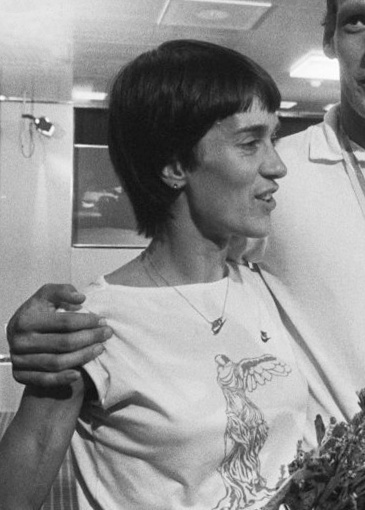
- Carla Beurskens in 1982

Personal information
- Full name: Carolina Alwina Hubertina Beurskens
- Nationality: Dutch
- Born: 10 February 1952 (age 74) Tegelen, Limburg
- Height: 1.65 m (5 ft 5 in)
- Weight: 45 kg (99 lb)

Sport
- Sport: Running
- Event(s): 1500 metres 3000 metres marathon
- Club: Festina, Venlo

Carolina Alwina Hubertina "Carla" Beurskens (born 10 February 1952) was one of Holland's most prominent female long-distance runners from the second half of the 1970s until well into the 1990s, including all distances from 3000 metres to the marathon. During the greater part of this period she was most successful at the longer distance.

The variety of the twenty-three national titles she obtained during her long carrier shows how Beurskens dominated métier: three titles on indoor- and five on outdoor tracks, nine on the road and six in the cross country. In long distances she is the most accomplished Dutch female athlete in modern history.

Carla Beurskens did not very often represent her native country in major international tournaments. She took part in the Summer Olympics twice: in Los Angeles 1984 and Seoul 1988, three times in European and one time in World Championships. For various reasons she never performed particularly well at those events. Her fifth place in the European Championships marathon of 1982 in Athens was her best achievement ever.

Much better were Beurskens’ achievements in the marathons of various big cities all over the world. For instance, with the exception of Kenya's Tegla Loroupe, she is the only female athlete who won the Rotterdam Marathon more than once. And this although shortly after her first victory in 1984 she declared that in the future she would ignore Rotterdam, unless the circumstances for female competitors would improve drastically. Finally in 1990 the circumstances seemed to fulfil the conditions of the athlete from Limburg, because she appeared on the scene once more and won for the second time. Moreover, she became the first female in Rotterdam to realise a time within two-and-a-half hours: 2:29:47. She won the City-Pier-City Loop half marathon in the Hague four times (1984–86, 1990).

Carla Beurskens ran her personal best (2:26:34 hours) on November 15, 1987, in the Tokyo Marathon, finishing second behind triple winner Katrin Dörre. This Dutch national record stood for nearly thirteen years. It was finally broken on November 2, 2003, by the Dutch Kenyan Lornah Kiplagat at the New York Marathon: 2:23:43. Beurskens was also victorious in the Nagoya marathon in Japan in 1987, finishing in 2:28:27, taking into account the bad weather conditions (some snow showers on the way), in Eindhoven in 1995 and Enschede in 1997, both towns in The Netherlands. She won the Parelloop 10 km in race in the Netherlands in 1993

Eight out of the ten times she participated in the Honolulu Marathon in Hawaii, she carried off the palm, for the first time in 1985. A two-week vacation offer came together with the invitation for this event. She took part without being fully prepared and won straightaway. In the following years up to 1994 her series of victories was only interrupted in 1988 and 1991. With her eight victories in Hawaii she is the most successful female marathon runner ever. Nowadays she is invited by the organizers to be present at the event as a guest of honour.

== Achievements ==
Year	Competition	Venue	Position	Event	Notes
Representing the Netherlands
1982	Osaka Ladies Marathon	Osaka, Japan	2nd	Marathon	2:34:14
1982	European Championships	Athens, Greece	5th	Marathon	2:39:22
1983	World Championships	Helsinki, Finland	17th	Marathon	2:39:25
1984	City-Pier-City Loop	The Hague, Netherlands	1st	Half Marathon	1:12:57
1984	Rotterdam Marathon	Rotterdam, Netherlands	1st	Marathon	2:34:56
1984	Olympic Games	Los Angeles, United States	22nd	Marathon	2:37:51
1985	City-Pier-City Loop	The Hague, Netherlands	1st	Half Marathon	1:10:44
1985	Frankfurt Marathon	Frankfurt, Germany	1st	Marathon	2:28:37
1985	Honolulu Marathon	Honolulu, Hawaii	1st	Marathon	2:35:51
1986	Egmond Half Marathon	Egmond, Netherlands	1st	Half Marathon	1:18:16
1986	City-Pier-City Loop	The Hague, Netherlands	1st	Half Marathon	1:09:28
1986	European Championships	Stuttgart, West Germany	7th	Marathon	2:39:05
1986	Honolulu Marathon	Honolulu, Hawaii	1st	Marathon	2:31:01
1987	Nagoya Marathon	Nagoya, Japan	1st	Marathon	2:28:27
1987	Tokyo Marathon	Tokyo, Japan	2nd	Marathon	2:26:34
1987	Honolulu Marathon	Honolulu, Hawaii	1st	Marathon	2:35:11
1988	Olympic Games	Seoul, South Korea	34th	Marathon	2:37:52
1989	Honolulu Marathon	Honolulu, Hawaii	1st	Marathon	2:31:50
1990	Egmond Half Marathon	Egmond, Netherlands	1st	Half Marathon	1:13:25
1990	City-Pier-City Loop	The Hague, Netherlands	1st	Half Marathon	1:10:04
1990	Rotterdam Marathon	Rotterdam, Netherlands	1st	Marathon	2:29:47
1990	Honolulu Marathon	Honolulu, Hawaii	1st	Marathon	2:33:34
1992	Honolulu Marathon	Honolulu, Hawaii	1st	Marathon	2:32:13
1993	Honolulu Marathon	Honolulu, Hawaii	1st	Marathon	2:32:20
1994	Honolulu Marathon	Honolulu, Hawaii	1st	Marathon	2:37:06
1995	Eindhoven Marathon	Eindhoven, Netherlands	1st	Marathon	2:35:16
1997	Enschede Marathon	Enschede, Netherlands	1st	Marathon	2:37:20

Awards
Preceded by Els Vader	KNAU Cup; 1982; 1985	Succeeded by Ria Stalman
Preceded by Ria Stalman	KNAU Cup; 1982; 1985	Succeeded by Nelli Cooman
Sporting positions
Preceded by (Netherlands) Wilma Rusman	Egmond Women's Half Marathon Winner; 1986	Succeeded by (Belgium) Magda Ilands
Preceded by (Netherlands) Marianne van de Linde	Women's Zevenheuvelenloop Winner (15km); 1989–1990	Succeeded by (Norway) Ingrid Kristiansen
Preceded by (Denmark) Dorthe Rasmussen	Egmond Women's Half Marathon Winner; 1990	Succeeded by (Czechoslovakia) Alena Peterkova
