= Mekides Shimeles =

Ethiopian long-distance runner

Personal information
- Nationality: Ethiopian
- Born: 26 December 2005 (age 20) Ethiopia
- Occupation: Long-distance runner
- Years active: 2024–present

Sport
- Sport: Athletics
- Event(s): Marathon, Half marathon

Achievements and titles
- Personal bests: 10 km road: 33:00 (Chon Buri 2024); Half marathon: 1:08:18 (The Hague 2025); Marathon: 2:18:56 (Rotterdam 2026)
Medal record
Athletics
Representing Ethiopia
World Athletics Label Road Races
Gold medal – first place	2026 Rotterdam	Marathon

Mekides Shimeles (born 26 December 2005) is an Ethiopian long-distance runner who specializes in the marathon. She is best known for her course-record-breaking victory at the 2026 Rotterdam Marathon.

== Career ==
Mekides Shimeles began competing internationally on the road circuit in 2024. In early 2025, she demonstrated her potential at longer distances by winning the City-Pier-City Loop half marathon in The Hague, clocking a personal best of 1:08:18. Later that year, she made a strong marathon debut at the Amsterdam Marathon, securing a podium finish in third place with a time of 2:19:56.

In April 2026, Mekides Shimeles achieved a major career milestone at the Rotterdam Marathon. Despite a challenging moment at the 25 km mark where she had to turn back to retrieve her hydration bottle, she maintained her composure to rejoin the lead pack. By the 30 km mark, she launched a solo attack, eventually winning the race in a personal best time of 2:18:56. This performance broke the long-standing course record of 2:18:58, which had been held by Olympic champion Tiki Gelana since 2012.

== Achievements ==
Year	Race	Place	Position	Time
2025	City-Pier-City Loop	The Hague	1st (Half marathon)	1:08:18
2025	Amsterdam Marathon	Amsterdam	3rd (Marathon)	2:19:56
2026	Rotterdam Marathon	Rotterdam	1st (Marathon)	2:18:56
