= Lornah Kiplagat =

Dutch long-distance runner (born 1974)

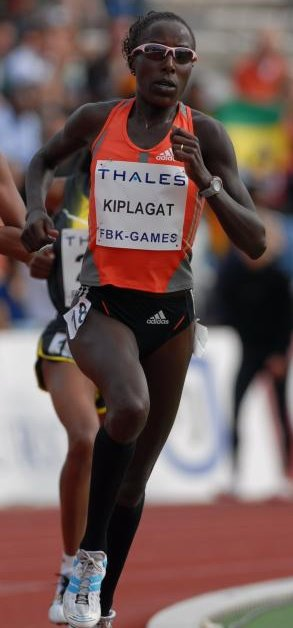
- Kiplagat competing at the FBK Games 2007

Personal information
- Born: 1 May 1974 (age 52) Kabiemit, Kenya
- Height: 1.66 m (5 ft 5 in)
- Weight: 49 kg (108 lb)

Sport
- Sport: Long-distance runner
Medal record
Women's athletics
Representing Netherlands
World Cross Country Championships
Gold medal – first place	2007 Mombasa	Long race
Silver medal – second place	2006 Fukuoka	Long race
World Half Marathon Championships
Gold medal – first place	2008 Rio de Janeiro	Individual
Silver medal – second place	2005 Edmonton	Individual
World Road Running Championships
Gold medal – first place	2006 Debrecen	Individual
Gold medal – first place	2007 Udine	Individual
European Cross Country Championships
Gold medal – first place	2005 Tilburg	Individual
- Updated on 21 July 2008

Lornah Kiplagat (born 1 May 1974) is a Dutch professional long-distance runner. She was born in Kabiemit, Rift Valley Province, Kenya and moved to the Netherlands in 1999. She gained Dutch citizenship in 2003 and has competed for the Netherlands ever since. She used to run not only road events but also in cross country and track and field.

She ran at the 2004, 2008 and 2012 Summer Olympics, was the 2007 gold medallist at the IAAF World Cross Country Championships, and took three straight World Road Running Championship titles from 2006 to 2008. In the marathon, she holds a best time of 2:22:22 hours and has won major races in Rotterdam, Amsterdam and Osaka. She currently holds the world road record over 5 kilometres and 10 miles. Her best times over 20 km and the half marathon distance were world records from 2007 to 2011 and remain the second fastest times ever.

Part of a highly successful family of runners, her relatives include Sylvia Kibet, Hilda Kibet and Susan Sirma.

She is the founder of the famous high altitude training centre in Iten, Kenya. The centre is at 2400 metres high above sea level. Elite athletes and recreational runners from all over the world visit HATC every year for training. She is also the founder of her own African inspired sports brand called Lornah.

== Career ==
Kiplagat was already performing well when she ran for Kenya. She was the first woman to win both the Falmouth Road Race and the Peachtree Road Race. As of 2006 she is still the only woman to achieve this, but she achieved it three times in a row (2000, 2001 and 2002) and a fourth time in 2005 as well. Among her other achievements are the Amsterdam Marathon, the Rotterdam Marathon, the Osaka Ladies Marathon and the Los Angeles Marathon.

In 1999 Kiplagat moved to the Netherlands; four years later she gained Dutch citizenship which allowed her to run for the Netherlands as of 2003. That same year she lowered the Dutch marathon record to 2:23.43 during the New York City Marathon. She also participated in the 2004 Summer Olympics, where she finished 5th in the 10,000m.

The year 2005 was a successful one for Kiplagat: she won a silver medal at the 2005 IAAF World Half Marathon Championships then took the title at the 2005 European Cross Country Championships, feats which led to her begin selected as the Dutch athlete of the year. At the 2006 IAAF World Cross Country Championships she finished second in Japan, winning the silver medal. She also finished fifth in the 10,000m at the 2006 European Athletics Championships.

She won the 2007 World Cross Country Championships held in Mombasa, Kenya. Earlier, in February 2007, she competed at the Kenyan Cross Country Championships as an invited athlete and won the women's race, ahead of the elite among her former compatriots. In winning these championships, she beat off the entire Ethiopian challenge, of defending champion Tirunesh Dibaba, the previous short course champion Gelete Burka, and double bronze medalist from 2006, Meselech Melkamu. They finished: Dibaba, 2nd, Melkamu, 3rd, Burka, 4th.

Besides having owned the Dutch record for the marathon from 2003 until 2022, Kiplagat also owns four world records. In the 5 km road race she ran the distance in 14:47, while she lowered her own record in the 10 miles of 50.54 by two seconds to 50.50 during the 2006 Dam tot Damloop, which she also won in 2002. On 14 October 2007, Kiplagat set a new half marathon world record of 1:06:25 at the World Road Running Championships at Udine, Italy, while defending the title she first won in 2006. She also smashed her own 20 km world record en route, running 1:02:57. However, Paula Radcliffe has run a faster half-marathon on the slightly downhill Great North Run course in 2003.

Kiplagat was ruled out for the whole of 2009 and returned to competition with a win at the Runner's World Zandvoort Circuit Run in March 2010. In September, she ran at the Dam tot Damloop and was the runner-up behind her niece Hilda Kibet, finishing with a time of 52:03. She returned to the marathon event for the 2011 London Marathon and completed her first race over the distance in four years, coming 18th with a time of 2:27:57 hours. Although she was far from the podium and failed to gain the World Championship qualifying time, she considered the race a success following her previous injury-ridden seasons. She improved at the 2011 Amsterdam Marathon, crossing the line after 2:25:52 hours to claim third place, the Dutch national title, and the 2012 Summer Olympics qualifying time. Despite being almost four minutes slower than the winner (Tiki Gelana), she said: "I am the happiest woman in Amsterdam, and perhaps the whole world".

== Achievements ==
- Greifenseelauf (1997)
- Boilermaker Road Race (1997, 1998)
- Los Angeles Marathon (1997, 1998)
- Tilburg Ten Miles (1997, 2000, 2004)
- Amsterdam Marathon (1999)
- City-Pier-City Loop (2000)
- Dam tot Damloop (2000, 2002, 2006)
- Peachtree Road Race (2000, 2001, 2002, 2005, 2006)
- Falmouth Road Race (2000, 2001, 2002, 2005)
- Glasgow Women's 10K (7 times: 2000–2006)
- 20 van Alphen (2001)
- World's Best 10K (2001, 2004, 2005, 2006, 2007, 2008)
- Osaka Ladies Marathon (2002)
- Egmond Half Marathon (2003)
- New York Mini 10K (2003, 2005, 2006, 2007)
- 2004 Summer Olympics 10,000 m (5th)
- 2005 IAAF World Half Marathon Championships, Edmonton (silver)
- 2005 European Cross Country Championships, Tilburg (gold)
- 2006 IAAF World Road Running Championships, Debrecen (gold)
- 2006 IAAF World Cross Country Championships, Fukuoka (long race) (silver)
- 2007 IAAF World Road Running Championships, Udine (gold)
- Beach to Beacon (2005)
- Steamboat Classic (2006)
- Singelloop Utrecht (2007)
- Montferland Run (2008)

== Personal bests ==
- 5 km road: 14:47
- 10 km road: 30:32
- 10 Mile: 50:50
- 20 km road: 62:57
- Half marathon: 66:25
- Marathon: 2:22:22

Awards
Preceded by Jacqueline Poelman	KNAU Cup; 2003	Succeeded by Karin Ruckstuhl
Preceded by Karin Ruckstuhl as KNAU Cup	Women's Dutch Athlete of the Year; 2005; 2007, 2008	Succeeded by Karin Ruckstuhl
Preceded by Karin Ruckstuhl	Women's Dutch Athlete of the Year; 2005; 2007, 2008	Succeeded by Jolanda Keizer
Records
Preceded by (South Africa) Elana Meyer	Women's Half marathon World record holder 14 October 2007 – 18 February 2011	Succeeded by (Kenya) Mary Keitany
