= Tilburg Ten Miles =

- Date: late August or early September
- Location: Tilburg, Netherlands
- Event type: Road
- Distance: 10 mile (men's); 10K run (women's)
- Primary sponsor: CZ Groep
- Established: 1988
- Course records: Men: (Ethiopia) H Gebrselassie 44:24 (10 mile); Women: (Israel) Lonah Chemtai 30:05 (10km)
- Website: Tilburg Ten Miles

Tilburg Ten Miles is an annual road running competition held in Tilburg, Netherlands since 1988. Despite its name, it is a 10-mile (16 km) competition only for men, while the women's competition is nowadays held over 10 kilometres (6 mi). Since 2002 the competition has been held early September, previous editions were held in late May or early June. Since 2009, the race program has featured a 10K race for men, in addition to the primary 10-miler.

== Winners ==
Key: Course record

=== 10-mile race ===
Men's 10-mile
Year	Winner	Nationality	Time
1988	Addy Smetsers	Netherlands	56:10
1989	Michel Ziekman	Netherlands	52:46
1990	Jan Smets	Belgium	50:36
1991	Filip Steelandt	Belgium	50:11
1992	David Choge	Kenya	48:46
1993	Simon Naali	Tanzania	48:15
1994	Simon Lopuyet	Kenya	46:21
1995	Simon Lopuyet	Kenya	47:23
1996	Thomas Osano	Kenya	46:10
1997	Thomas Osano	Kenya	46:46
1998	Worku Bikila	Ethiopia	47:00
1999	Eliud Kurgat	Kenya	45:59
2000	Eliud Kurgat	Kenya	46:53
2001	Rodgers Rop	Kenya	45:56
2002	Wilson Kigen	Kenya	46:32
2003	Luke Kibet	Kenya	46:18
2004	Sammy Rongo	Kenya	46:53
2005	Haile Gebrselassie	Ethiopia	44:24 (WR)
2006	Cosmas Kimutai	Kenya	46:15
2007	Wesley Langat	Kenya	46:11
2008	Abiyote Guta	Ethiopia	46:02
2009	Abiyote Guta	Ethiopia	46:08
2010	Job Tanui	Kenya	47:19
2011	Philemon Rono	Kenya	47:21
2012	Pius Kiprop	Kenya	45:38
2013	Tsegay Tuemay	Eritrea	46:06
2014	Bernard Koech	Kenya	45:12
2015	Bernard Koech	Kenya	45:21
2016	Rodgers Kwemoi	Kenya	46:04
2017	Rodgers Kwemoi	Kenya	45:03
2018	Rodgers Kwemoi	Kenya	45:23
2019	Abel Chebet	Uganda	46:13
2022	Emmanuel Kiprop	Kenya	46:41

Women's 10-mile
Year	Winner	Nationality	Time
1988	Marjan van Doorne	Netherlands	1:25:15
1989	Toos Kester	Netherlands	1:02:22
1990	Karen Leenaerts	Netherlands	1:08:47
1991	Petra van Limpt	Netherlands	58:14
1992	Jeanne Jansen	Netherlands	58:35

=== 10KM race ===
Key: Course record Shorter distance (5-mile/8K) Dutch national championship race

Year	Men's winner	Nationality	Time (h:m:s)	Women's winner	Nationality	Time (h:m:s)
1993				Tegla Loroupe	Kenya	33:43
1994				Tegla Loroupe	Kenya	33:49
1995				Joyce Chepchumba	Kenya	26:06
1996				Tegla Loroupe	Kenya	25:15
1997				Lornah Kiplagat	Kenya	25:09
1998				Tegla Loroupe	Kenya	32:03
1999				Tegla Loroupe	Kenya	31:02
2000				Lornah Kiplagat	Kenya	31:14
2001				Susan Chepkemei	Kenya	31:52
2002				Susan Chepkemei	Kenya	31:11
2003				Susan Chepkemei	Kenya	32:10
2004				Lornah Kiplagat	Netherlands	30:59
2005				Edith Masai	Kenya	31:37
2006				Nadia Ejjafini	Bahrain	32:16
2007				Belaynesh Fikadu	Ethiopia	31:56
2008				Mestawet Tufa	Ethiopia	31:48
2009	Peter Kamais	Kenya	27:09	Mestawet Tufa	Ethiopia	31:15
2010	Abera Kuma	Ethiopia	27:52	Meselech Melkamu	Ethiopia	31:33
2011	Khalid Choukoud	Netherlands	28:56	Joyce Chepkirui	Kenya	30:38
2012	Huub Regegeld	Netherlands	35:39	Gladys Cherono	Kenya	30:57
2013	Jean-Pierre Hoeboer	Netherlands	34:25	Tirunesh Dibaba	Ethiopia	30:30
2014	Emile Luijbregts	Netherlands	36:10	Betsy Saina	Kenya	30:46
2015	Peter-Paul Derks	Netherlands	35:13	Genet Yalew	Ethiopia	30:58
2016	Emile Luijbregts	Netherlands	34:40	Alice Aprot	Kenya	31:34
2017	Nick van Nieuwenhuizen	Netherlands	33:43	Senbere Teferi	Ethiopia	30:38
2018	Ilias Osman	Netherlands	30:50	Agnes Tirop	Kenya	30:50
2019	Jelle Tielemans	Belgium	34:46	Lonah Chemtai	Israel	30:05
