= Francis Kibiwott Larabal =

Kenyan long-distance runner (born 1978)

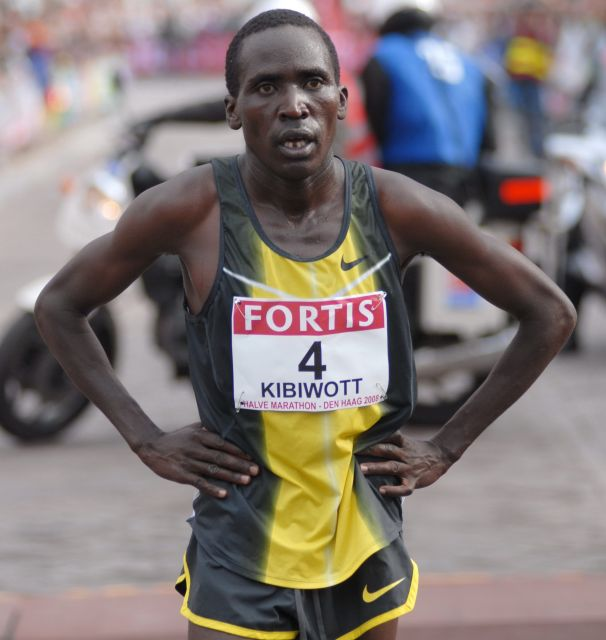
Francis Kibiwott

Francis Kibiwott Larabal (born 15 September 1978 in Kasiela, Baringo District) is a Kenyan long-distance runner who competes professionally in half marathon and marathon races.

Kibiwott was unusual for a Kenyan runner in that he did not compete extensively in his youth. He began training in seriousness in his twenties, moving to Nyahururu. His first European races came at the 20 van Alphen: he was 13th in 2002 and improved to third place the following year.

He won the 2003 Dam tot Damloop held between Amsterdam and Zaandam, finished in second position in 2004, then won his second title in 2005. His time (45:27) during his second win was the world's fastest time in a 10-mile race that year, out-sprinting the world half marathon champion Fabiano Joseph Naasi. The race was his first after a long period of injuries and he only started training in July 2006 again. In 2006 he also managed to win the Delhi Half Marathon in a new course record. He won the Obudu Ranch International Mountain Race, winning US$50,000 and breaking the course record by five minutes in the process. He also won the Route du Vin Half Marathon that year.

In 2007 he was fourth at the RAK Half Marathon, then was runner-up at the Berlin Half Marathon. He competed at the 2007 IAAF World Road Running Championships in Udine, Italy, finishing 45th. He made a move up to the marathon distance after that season and made his debut at the 2009 Paris Marathon, where he recorded a time of 2:09:13 hours for 12th place in the high calibre race. He improved his best to two hours and nine minutes at the JoongAng Seoul Marathon later that year, a time which brought him his first win over the distance. He was ninth at the Paris race in 2010 and came fifth at the Madrid Marathon in 2011. His first outing of 2012 was at the Tiberias Marathon and he was just two seconds behind the winner Patrick Tambwé, ending the course as the runner-up with a personal record of 2:07:32 hours. He followed this with a course record win in 2:09:05 hours at the Nagano Marathon.

== Race wins ==
- 2003 Dam tot Damloop (45:44)
- 2006 Dam tot Damloop (45:27)
- 2006 Delhi Half Marathon (1:01:36)
- 2009 JoongAng Seoul Marathon (2:09:00)
- 2012 Nagano Marathon (2:09:05)
