= Herpasa Negasa =

Ethiopian marathon runner

Personal information
- Born: 11 September 1993 (age 32)

Sport
- Sport: Athletics
- Event(s): Half marathon, Marathon

Achievements and titles
- Personal bests: Half marathon: 1:00:41 (Manama 2019); Marathon: 2:03:40 (Dubai 2019)

Herpasa Negasa Kitesa (born 11 September 1993) is an Ethiopian long-distance runner who competes in marathon races. His personal best of 2:03:40 hours ranks him among the fastest of all time in the event.

Herpasa made his professional debut in 2013 with outings at three marathons. His fastest time was 2:10:51 hours, from his 16th-place finish at the Dubai Marathon. He placed third at the Madrid Marathon in April, but dropped to ninth at the Košice Peace Marathon in October. After skipping 2014, he returned with a new best of 2:10:18 at the 2015 Lyon Marathon, where he was runner-up to Kenya's Nixon Kipkoech Machichim. He knocked one second off his best at the 2016 Mumbai Marathon for fourth place, before going on to have his first career win at the Montferland Run.

He did not compete in 2017, but gained representation from Italian agent Gianni Demadonna. Herpasa had a second outing at the Dubai Marathon in 2018, but again failed to reach the top ten. His two other marathon runs that year were more successful, with third place at the Warsaw Marathon and runner-up at the Hengshui Lake Marathon in a personal best of 2:09:14 (his first run under two hours and ten minutes).

It was a third appearance at the Dubai Marathon which brought Negasa to prominence, as he placed second behind Getaneh Molla with a significant personal best of 2:03:40 hours – a time which moved him up to eighth on the all-time lists for the distance.

== Personal bests ==
- 15K run – 43:02 (2016)
- Half marathon – 1:00:41 (2019)
- Marathon – 2:03:40 (2019)
