= William Kipsang =

Kenyan long-distance runner

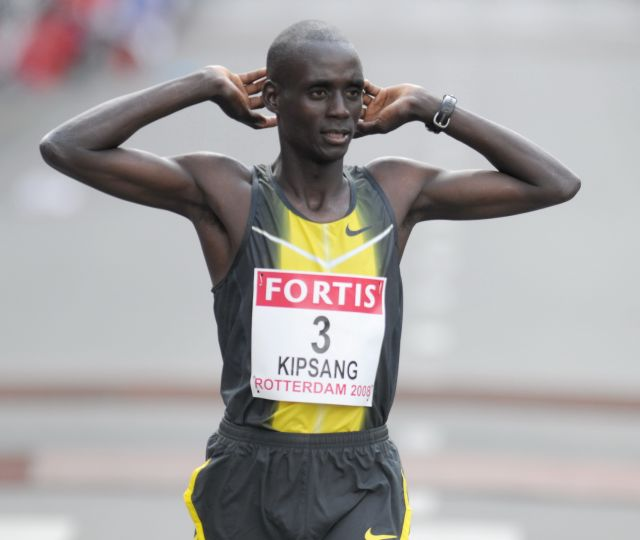
- William Kipsang at the 2008 Rotterdam Marathon
- Born: 26 June 1977 (age 48); Kenya
- Occupation: Marathon runner

William Rop Kipsang (born 26 June 1977) is a Kenyan long-distance runner who specialises in the marathon. He has won marathons in Amsterdam, Rotterdam, Beirut and Seoul. His personal best for the event is 2:05:49 hours.

His best performance was on 13 April 2008, winning the Rotterdam Marathon with a new course record and PR of 2:05:49. On 15 April 2007 he was placed third in this race, running in difficult circumstances due to the warm weather. He has previously won the Amsterdam Marathon (2003), the Egmond Half Marathon (2004) and the Dam tot Damloop 10 mile race (2005).

In 2006 he earned seventh place in the New York City Marathon. Kipsang did not compete in the marathon for two years between 2008 and 2010, and his comeback at the Seoul International Marathon was a slow 2:24:11 run for 33rd place – a time only two seconds quicker than the women's winner that year. He struggled to return to his previous form, but did manage to improve upon his Seoul outing the following year, taking sixth at the Rock 'n' Roll San Diego Marathon in 2:15:06. He ran two marathons in 2012: a return to San Diego saw him fare worse than the previous year, managing only ninth in 2:16:43, but his run of 2:14:53 hours for third at the Beirut Marathon was his best time and placing in a marathon since 2008.

At the 2013 Milan City Marathon he came sixth in 2:16:24, but a run of 2:13:34 at the Beirut Marathon saw him take his first victory at a race in over five years.

== Road races ==
- 2002: 1st Montferland Run - 44.33
- 2005: 1st Dam tot Damloop - 46:04
- 2004: 1st Egmond Half Marathon - 1:04:50

=== Marathon ===
- 2003: 12th Paris Marathon - 2:12:34
- 2003: 1st Amsterdam Marathon - 2:06:39
- 2004: 2nd Seoul International Marathon - 2:07:43
- 2004: 2nd Amsterdam Marathon - 2:08:40
- 2005: 1st Seoul International Marathon - 2:08:53
- 2005: 7th Chicago Marathon - 2:09:49
- 2006: 8th Seoul International Marathon - 2:13:30
- 2006: 7th New York City Marathon - 2:11:54
- 2007: 3rd Rotterdam Marathon - 2:11:03
- 2007: 10th New York City Marathon - 2:15:32
- 2008: 1st Rotterdam Marathon - 2:05:49
- 2010: 7th Chicago Marathon - 2:16:41
- 2013: 1st Beirut Marathon - 02:13:34

== Personal bests ==
Distance	Mark	Date	Location
10 km	28:11	2007-03-17	The Hague
15 km	42:34	2007-03-17	The Hague
20 km	57:07	2007-03-17	The Hague
Half Marathon	1:00:25	2007-03-17	The Hague
25 km	1:14:22	2005-03-13	Seoul
30 km	1:29:31	2005-03-13	Seoul
Marathon	2:05:48	2008-04-13	Rotterdam
