= Edwin Kiptoo =

Kenyan long-distance runner

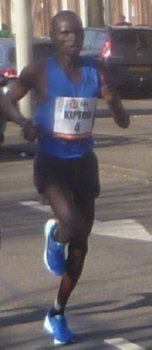

Personal information
- Born: 14 August 1993 (age 32)

Sport
- Country: Kenya
- Sport: Long-distance running

Edwin Kiptoo (born 14 August 1993) is a Kenyan long-distance runner competing in marathon and half marathon events. In 2016, he won the Beirut Marathon with a time of 2:13:19.

He also won several half marathon events: the Great Eastern Run and Cardiff Half Marathon in 2011, the Bath Half Marathon in 2012, the Zwolle Half Marathon in 2013, the Egmond Half Marathon in 2018, and the Halong Bay Heritage Half Marathon in 2025.

In 2015 and 2016 he won the Dam tot Damloop, a 10-mile race held in the Netherlands. In 2016 he also finished in 3rd place in the Brighton Marathon.

In 2019, he finished in 2nd place in the Zevenheuvelenloop, a 15 kilometres event held in the Netherlands.

In 2022, he finished first place in the annual Mexico City Marathon held on the streets of Mexico City.

In 2023, he finished first place in the Athens Authentic Marathon, setting a new record of 2 hours, 10 minutes and 34 seconds.

In 2026, he finished first place in the Stockholm Marathon.
