= Parelloop =

- Date: late March
- Location: Brunssum, Netherlands
- Event type: Road
- Distance: 10K run
- Established: 1989
- Course records: Men's: 27:01 (2009) (Kenya) Micah Kogo; Women's: 31:07 (2016) (Kenya) Edith Chelimo
- Website: Parelloop
- Participants: 118 (2019)

Parelloop (Pearl Run in English) is an annual 10 kilometres road running competition usually held in late March or early April in Brunssum, Netherlands. The inaugural edition was held in 1989.

In 2009, Micah Kogo broke the world record for the 10 km road distance, previously held by Haile Gebrselassie. Since the mid-1990s, the competition has been dominated by Kenyan athletes, with only three winners coming from outside the East African nation since 1999.

== Winners ==
Key: Course record

Year	Men's race	Country	Time (m:s)	Women's race	Country	Time (m:s)
2020	Postponed to 2021 due to COVID-19					
2019	Mande Bushendich	Uganda	27:56	Evaline Chirchir	Kenya	31:17
2018	Joel Ayeko	Uganda	29:06	Maureen Koster	Netherlands	32:15
2017	Ezra Kering	Kenya	29:21	Naomi Jebet	Kenya	32:07
2016	Wilfred Kimitei	Kenya	28:02	Edith Chelimo	Kenya	31:07
2015	Nicodemus Kipkurui	Kenya	28:29	Maryanne Wanjiru	Kenya	32:21
2014	Philip Langat	Kenya	28:14	Edith Chelimo	Kenya	32:04
2013	James Rungaru	Kenya	28:03	Esther Ndiema	Kenya	31:53
2012	Philip Yego	Kenya	27:50	Esther Ndiema	Kenya	31:33
2011	Micah Kogo	Kenya	27:15	Irina Mikitenko	Germany	32:06
2010	Martin Mathathi	Kenya	27:22	Tabitha Gichia	Kenya	32:57
2009	Micah Kogo	Kenya	27:01	Magdalene Mukunzi	Kenya	32:08
2008	Moses Masai	Kenya	27:22	Nancy Kiprop	Kenya	32:43
2007	Micah Kogo	Kenya	27:07	Hilda Kibet	Kenya	32:24
2006	Ridouane Harroufi	Morocco	29:00	Nadia Ejjafini	Bahrain	31:57
2005	John Kibowen	Kenya	27:51	Eunice Jepkorir	Kenya	32:19
2004	John Kibowen	Kenya	27:59	Hilda Kibet	Kenya	33:25
2003	John Kibowen	Kenya	27:40	Anne Wambui	Kenya	34:08
2002	Philip Mosima	Kenya	28:08	Lenah Cheruiyot	Kenya	31:42
2001	Sammy Kipketer	Kenya	27:18	Pamela Chepchumba	Kenya	31:51
2000	Paul Kosgei	Kenya	27:38	Susan Chepkemei	Kenya	32:25
1999	Paul Koech	Kenya	27:44	Tegla Loroupe	Kenya	31:55
1998	Worku Bikila	Ethiopia	27:31	Susan Chepkemei	Kenya	32:14
1997	Shem Kororia	Kenya	27:37	Nadezhda Wijenberg	Russia	33:25
1996	Thomas Osano	Kenya	28:02	Gabriela Vijverberg	Netherlands	33:42
1995	Simon Lopuyet	Kenya	27:49	Joyce Chepchumba	Kenya	32:43
1994	Rolando Vera	Ecuador	28:16	Marjan Freriks	Netherlands	32:35
1993	Tonnie Dirks	Netherlands	28:36	Carla Beurskens	Netherlands	33:20
1992	John Vermeule	Netherlands	29:02	Stefanija Statkuvienė	Lithuania	32:37
1991	Tonnie Dirks	Netherlands	28:36	Joke Kleijweg	Netherlands	32:44
1990	Jean-Pierre Paumen	Belgium	31:02	Marlie Mariutak	Netherlands	36:23
1989	Alex Rodgers	United Kingdom	35:05	G Cuypers	Netherlands	48:34
