= Alex Hagelsteens =

Belgian long-distance runner (born 1956)

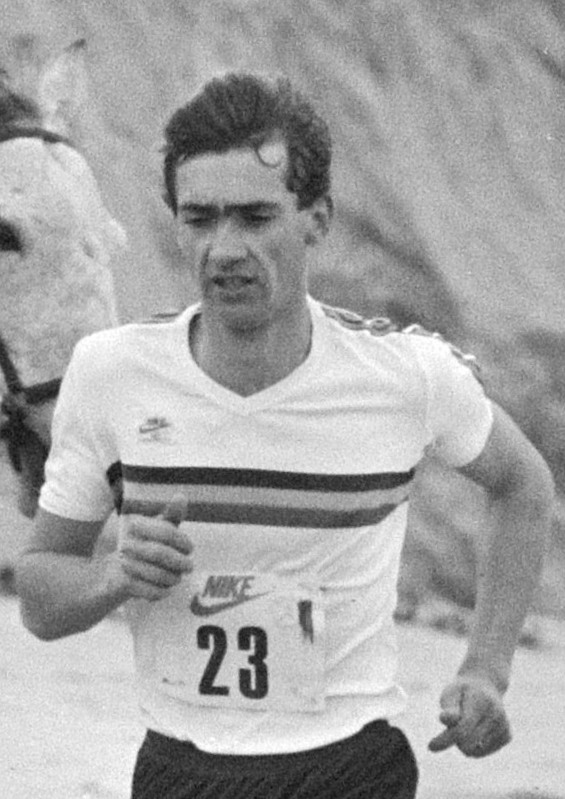
- Alex Hagelsteens at the Egmond Half Marathon 1984

Personal information
- Born: 15 July 1956 (age 69) Hasselt, Belgium
- Height: 1.78 m (5 ft 10 in)
- Weight: 60 kg (130 lb)

Sport
- Sport: Long-distance running
- Club: FC Luik

Alex Hagelsteens (born 15 July 1956) is a retired Belgian athlete who specialised in long-distance running and cross-country. He competed at the 1980 Summer Olympics in the 5000 and 10000 m events but failed to reach the finals. Hagelsteens was most successful at the Egmond Half Marathon, winning it in 1982 and 1984 and finishing second in 1985 and 1986.
