= Marti ten Kate =

Dutch long-distance runner

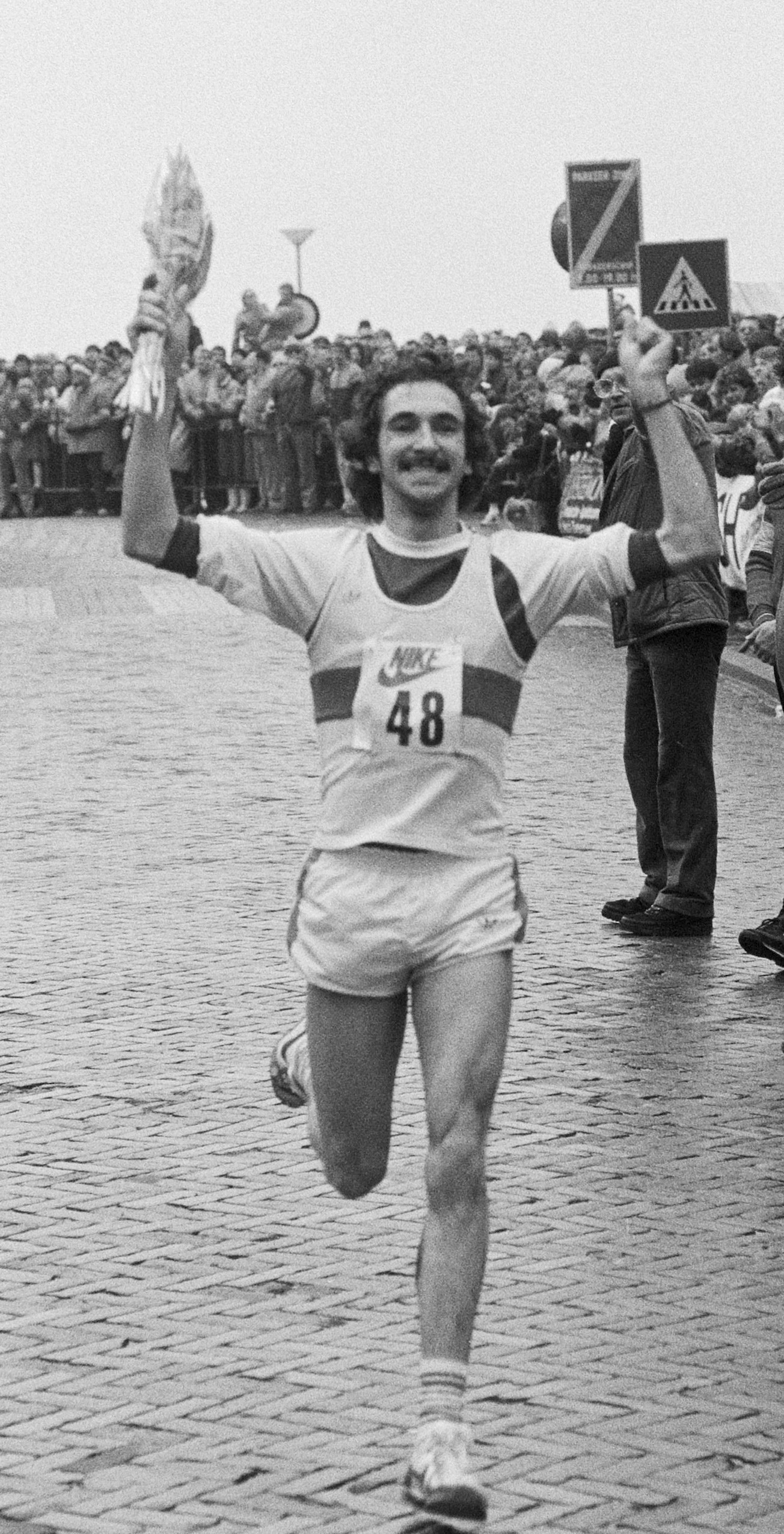
- Marti ten Kate in 1983

Personal information
- Born: 16 December 1958 (age 67) Vollenhove, the Netherlands
- Height: 1.72 m (5 ft 8 in)
- Weight: 58 kg (128 lb)

Sport
- Sport: Long-distance running
- Club: Vlug en Lenig, Den Haag

Martin "Marti" ten Kate (born 16 December 1958) is a retired long-distance runner from the Netherlands, who represented his native country at the 1988 Summer Olympics in Seoul, South Korea, where he finished in 9th place in the 10,000 metres (27:50.30), and 15th (02:14:53) in the marathon. Ten Kate won the Enschede Marathon twice (1987 and 1989).

He won the City-Pier-City Loop half marathon in the Hague four times a row (1987–1990).

== Achievements ==
Year	Competition	Venue	Position	Event	Notes
Representing Netherlands
1983	Egmond Half Marathon	Egmond, Netherlands	1st	Half Marathon	1:06:45
1987	City-Pier-City Loop	The Hague, Netherlands	1st	Half Marathon	1:03:14
1987	Enschede Marathon	Enschede, Netherlands	1st	Marathon	2:13:52
1987	World Championships	Rome, Italy	24th	Marathon	2:22:21
1988	Egmond Half Marathon	Egmond, Netherlands	1st	Half Marathon	1:03:26
1988	City-Pier-City Loop	The Hague, Netherlands	1st	Half Marathon	1:02:20
1988	Olympic Games	Seoul, South Korea	15th	Marathon	2:14:53
1989	City-Pier-City Loop	The Hague, Netherlands	1st	Half Marathon	1:01:34
1989	Enschede Marathon	Enschede, Netherlands	1st	Marathon	2:10:57
1990	Egmond Half Marathon	Egmond, Netherlands	1st	Half Marathon	1:03:32
1990	City-Pier-City Loop	The Hague, Netherlands	1st	Half Marathon	1:02:24
1990	European Championships	Split, Yugoslavia	8th	10,000m	28:12.53
1990	European Championships	Split, Yugoslavia	14th	Marathon	2:21:55
1994	European Championships	Helsinki, Finland	28th	Marathon	2:16:48

Sporting positions
Preceded by (United Kingdom) Sam Carey	Zevenheuvelenloop Men's Winner (15km); 1987	Succeeded by (United Kingdom) Robin Bergstrand
