= Dam tot Damloop =

Annual athletics competition

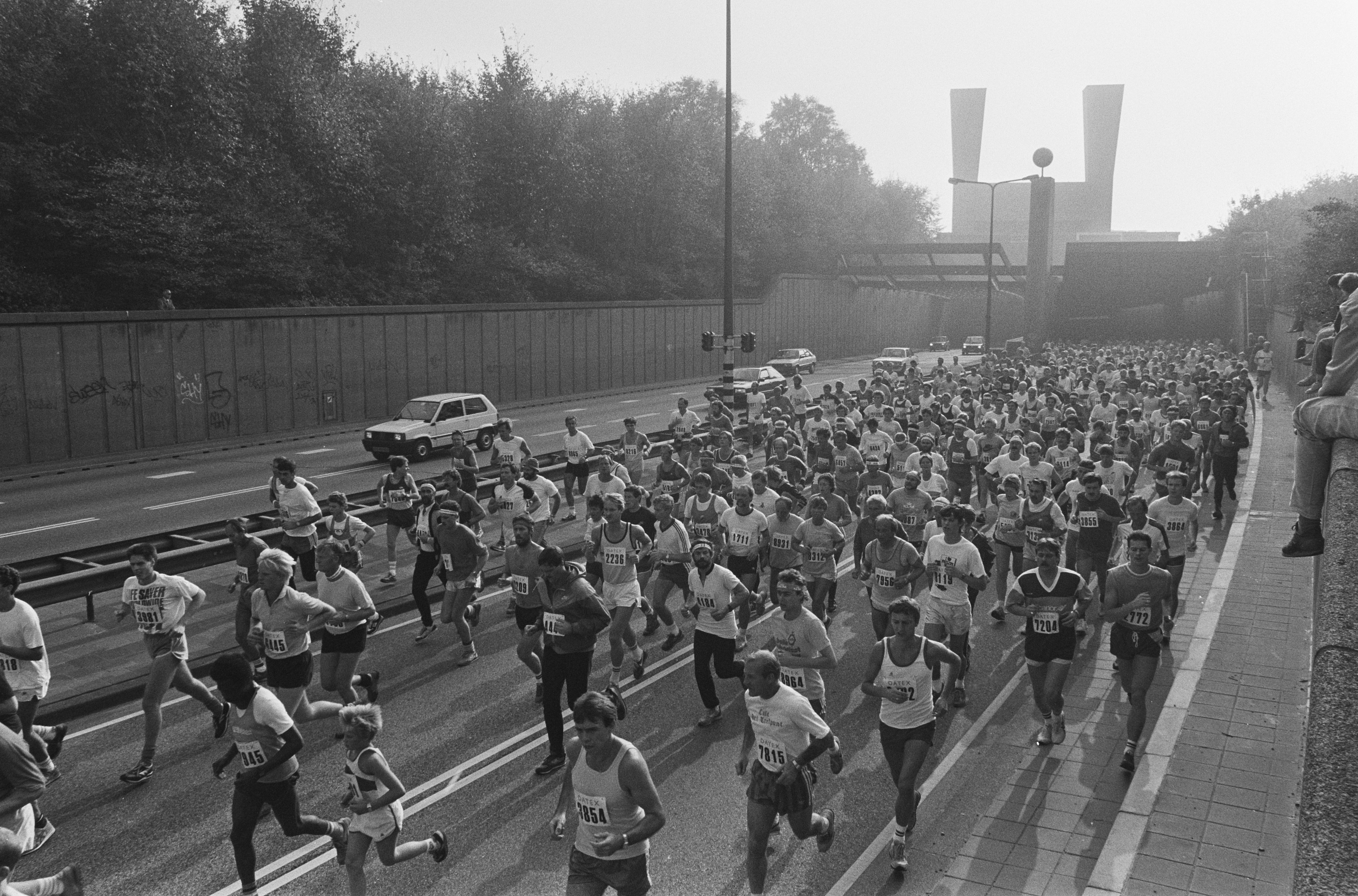
- Runners exiting the IJtunnel in 1986
- Date: Second-last sunday of September
- Location: From Amsterdam to Zaandam
- Event type: Road
- Distance: 10 miles (16 km)
- Primary sponsor: Asics
- Established: 1985
- Last held: 2024
- Course records: Men's: 44:27 (2011) (Kenya) Leonard Komon; Women's: 50:31 (1987) (Norway) Ingrid Kristiansen
- Website: Official website
- Participants: 36,350 (2014)

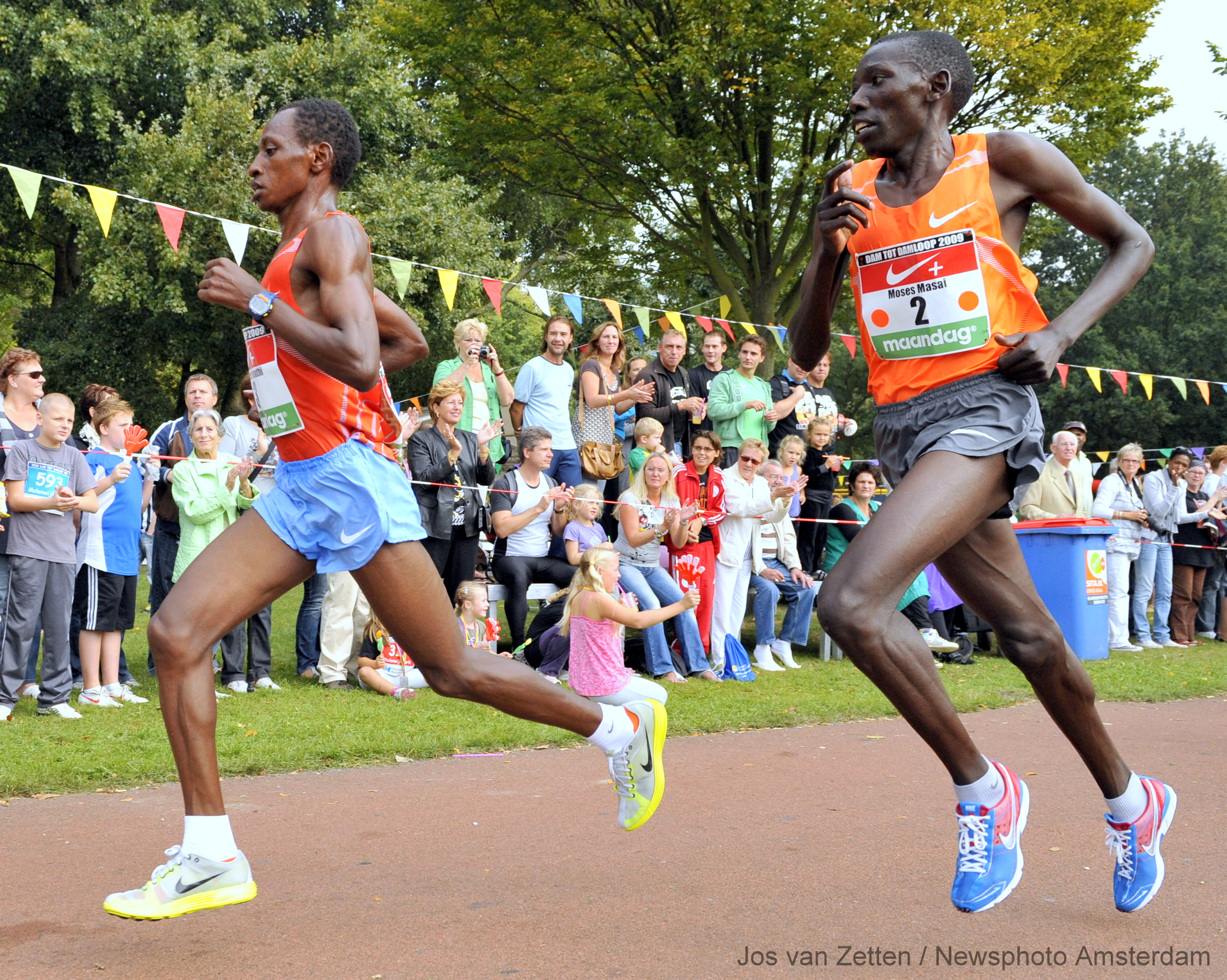
Moses Masai en route to his victory at the 2009 edition of the race

Dam tot Damloop (Dutch pronunciation: [dɑm tɔt ˈdɑmloːp]; English: Dam to Dam Run) is an annual road running competition held in the province of North Holland in the Netherlands. The main event is a 10-mile race from Amsterdam to Zaandam. The race was an IAAF Road Race Silver Label Event from 2013 until 2019.

== History ==
The Dam tot Damloop was first held as a fun run event in 1985. Elite runners were invited the following year, with world record holder Fernando Mamede and Dutch record holder Carla Beurskens taking the men's and women's titles. Ingrid Kristiansen set the current women's record in 1987 with her run of 50:31 minutes.

From the 1990s onwards, the elite race has been dominated by East African (particularly Kenyan) runners.

In 1999 and 2000, the main event was a half marathon instead of a 10 miles race.

Leonard Patrick Komon is the current men's course record holder with his time of 44:27 minutes in 2011 (the second fastest ever for the distance). From 2013 until 2019, the race was a Silver Label event of the IAAF Road Race Label Events.

The race was cancelled in 2020 and 2021 due to the COVID-19 pandemic.

== Races ==
The races are jointly organised by Stichting Sportevenementen Le Champion and two running clubs (AV Atos and AV Aalsmeer).

In addition to the main 10-mile race, the event hosts shorter races for children and several business team competitions. The Dam tot Damloop 10-miler attracts high level of participation: almost 10,000 runners competed in 1990, rising to almost 20,000 in 1999 and almost 40,000 in 2008.

The Damloop by night takes place the evening before the main Dam tot Damloop race. It is a 5-mile race in the dark through the centre of Zaandam.

== Winners ==
Information from the Association of Road Racing Statisticians website unless otherwise noted.

Key: Course record Half marathon

Year	Winner men	Nationality	Time (m:s)	Winner women	Nationality	Time (m:s)	Ref.
1985	Jan Sebille	Belgium	52:09	?	?	?	
1986	Fernando Mamede	Portugal	45:14	Carla Beurskens	Netherlands	53:04	
1987	Vincent Rousseau	Belgium	46:07	Ingrid Kristiansen	Norway	50:31	
1988	Domingos Castro	Portugal	46:55	Carla Beurskens	Netherlands	53:21	
1989	Dave Long	United Kingdom	46:28	Carla Beurskens	Netherlands	52:59	
1990	Brahim Lahlafi	Morocco	46:51	Heléna Barócsi	Hungary	53:57	
1991	Joseph Keino	Kenya	46:05	Heléna Barócsi	Hungary	53:54	
1992	Charles Omwoyo	Kenya	46:48	Heléna Barócsi	Hungary	52:10	
1993	Josephat Machuka	Kenya	45:22	Hellen Kimaiyo	Kenya	52:59	
1994	Charles Omwoyo	Kenya	45:50	Hellen Kimaiyo	Kenya	52:28	
1995	Paul Tergat	Kenya	45:50	Hellen Kimaiyo	Kenya	51:49	
1996	Josephat Machuka	Kenya	45:19	Tegla Loroupe	Kenya	53:01	
1997	Paul Koech	Kenya	44:45	Tegla Loroupe	Kenya	51:52	
1998	Brahim Lahlafi	Morocco	45:24	Leah Malot	Kenya	53:11	
1999	Mohammed Mourhit	Belgium	1:01:00	Tegla Loroupe	Kenya	1:09:20	
2000	Christopher Cheboiboch	Kenya	1:00:49	Lornah Kiplagat	Kenya	1:07:37	
2001	Charles Kamathi	Kenya	46:05	Susan Chepkemei	Kenya	51:23	
2002	Charles Kamathi	Kenya	45:08	Lornah Kiplagat	Kenya	50:54	
2003	Francis Kibiwott	Kenya	45:46	Restituta Joseph	Tanzania	52:17	
2004	Hendrick Ramaala	South Africa	46:04	Susan Chepkemei	Kenya	53:06	
2005	William Kipsang	Kenya	46:04	Isabella Ochichi	Kenya	51:08	
2006	Francis Kibiwott	Kenya	45:27	Lornah Kiplagat	Netherlands	50:50	
2007	Zersenay Tadese	Eritrea	45:51	Belaynesh Fikadu	Ethiopia	52:57	
2008	Sammy Kitwara	Kenya	45:16	Peninah Arusei	Kenya	51:21	
2009	Moses Masai	Kenya	45:16	Linet Masai	Kenya	50:39	
2010	John Mwangangi	Kenya	45:26	Hilda Kibet	Netherlands	51:30	
2011	Leonard Komon	Kenya	44:27	Priscah Cherono	Kenya	51:57	
2012	Leonard Komon	Kenya	44:48	Sylvia Kibet	Kenya	51:42	
2013	Nguse Amlosom	Eritrea	45:28	Joyce Chepkirui	Kenya	51:33	
2014	John Mwangangi	Kenya	45:45	Linet Masai	Kenya	53:09	
2015	Edwin Kiptoo	Kenya	45:19	Joyce Chepkirui	Kenya	51:30	
2016	Edwin Kiptoo	Kenya	45:25	Alice Aprot	Kenya	51:59	
2017	Birhanu Legese	Ethiopia	45:19	Mercyline Chelangat	Uganda	53:08	
2018	Joshua Cheptegei	Uganda	45:15	Lonah Salpeter	Israel	50:45	
2019	Solomon Berihu	Ethiopia	45:51	Evaline Chirchir	Kenya	50:32	
2020	Cancelled						
2021	Cancelled						
2022	Charles Langat	Kenya	45:14	Margaret Kipkemboi	Kenya	50:42	
2023	Mathew Kimeli	Kenya	45:18	Agnes Keino	Kenya	52:20	
2024	Muktar Edris	Ethiopia	44:51	Asayech Ayichew	Ethiopia	51:18	
2025	Jonathan Kamosong	Kenya	46:09	Hellen Obiri	Kenya	50:51	
2026	Jamal Kiprono	Kenya	46:10	Asayech Ayichew	Ethiopia	50:05	
