= Paul Angenvoorth =

German long-distance runner (1945–2023)

Personal information
- Nationality: German
- Born: 10 August 1945 Hüls, Germany
- Died: 30 October 2023 (aged 78) Krefeld, Germany

Sport
- Sport: Long-distance running
- Event: Marathon

Paul Angenvoorth (10 August 1945 – 30 October 2023) was a German long-distance runner. He competed in the marathon at the 1972 Summer Olympics representing West Germany. Angenvoorth died in Krefeld on 30 October 2023, at the age of 78.
