= Nadezhda Wijenberg =

Russian-Dutch marathon runner (born 1964)

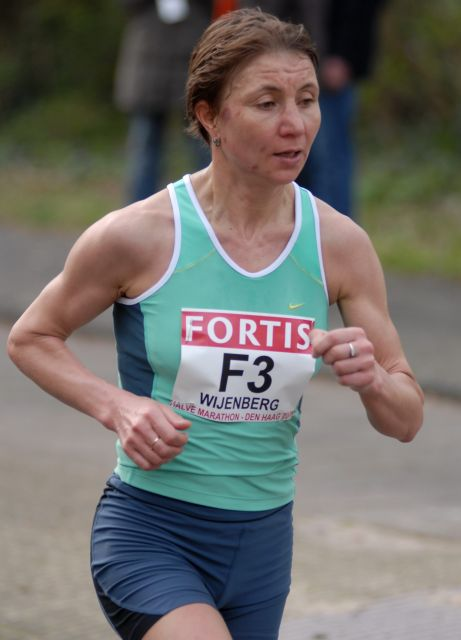

Personal information
- Born: 2 April 1964 (age 62) Kanash, Soviet Union

Sport
- Sport: Marathon running

Nadezhda Wijenberg (née Nadezhda Alexeevna Ilyina, born 2 April 1964 in Kanash) is a long-distance runner from Russia, who got the Dutch nationality in 1999 by marrying her coach Ger Wijenberg from the Netherlands.

Nadezhda "Nadja" Wijenberg lives in Schinnen, Limburg, and ran her personal best (2:28:45) in the Eindhoven Marathon, on 10 October 1999. That performance gave her a ticket for the 2000 Summer Olympics in Sydney, Australia, where she finished in 22nd place. She was the 2002 Netherlands national champion in the women's 5000 metres. She won the Lisbon Half Marathon 1993 and the Parelloop 10K in race in the Netherlands in 1997.

== Achievements ==
| Year | Competition | Venue | Position | Event | Notes |
Representing Russia
| 1992 | World Half Marathon Championships | Newcastle, United Kingdom | 9th | Half marathon | 1:10:58 |
| 1993 | Lisbon Half Marathon | Lisbon, Portugal | 1st | Half marathon | 1:09.47 |
| 1995 | World Championships | Gothenburg, Sweden | — | Marathon | DNF |
| 1996 | Amsterdam Marathon | Amsterdam, Netherlands | 1st | Marathon | 2:34:35 |
| 1998 | Rock 'n' Roll San Diego Marathon | San Diego, United States | 1st | Marathon | 2:34:17 |
Representing the Netherlands
| 1999 | Eindhoven Marathon | Eindhoven, Netherlands | 1st | Marathon | 2:28:45 |
| 2000 | Olympic Games | Sydney, Australia | 22nd | Marathon | 2:32:29 |
| 2001 | Rotterdam Marathon | Rotterdam, Netherlands | 4th | Marathon | 2:30:25 |
| 2002 | European Championships | Munich, Germany | 6th | Marathon | 2:36:06 |
| 2003 | Athens Classic Marathon | Athens, Greece | 1st | Marathon | 2:43:18 |
| 2004 | Enschede Marathon | Enschede, Netherlands | 1st | Marathon | 2:31:23 |
| 2005 | World Championships | Helsinki, Finland | 38th | Marathon | 2:39:36 |
