= Tegla Loroupe =

Kenyan long-distance runner (born 1973)

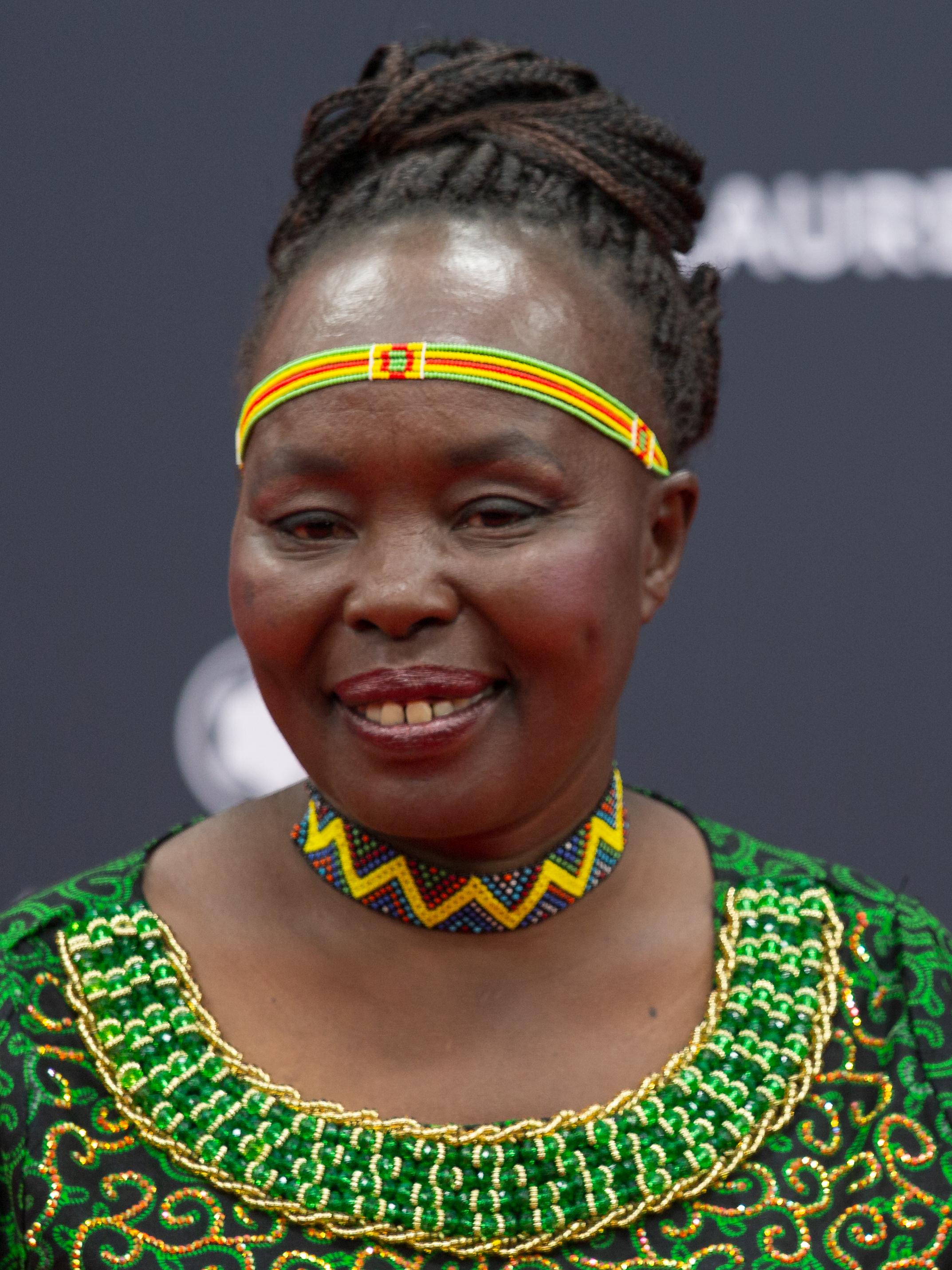
- Loroupe at the 25th Laureus World Sports Award in 2024

Personal information
- Nationality: Kenyan
- Born: 9 May 1973 (age 53) Kutomwony, Kenya
- Height: 156 cm (5 ft 1 in)
- Weight: 40 kg (88 lb)
- Website: Tegla Peace

Sport
- Sport: Long-distance running
- Events: 3000 meters, 5000 meters, 10,000 meters, Marathon

Achievements and titles
- Olympic finals: 2000 Sydney
- Personal bests: 3000 meters: 8:30.95 5000 meters: 14:45.95; 10,000 meters: 30:32.03; Marathon: 2:20:43 List of world records in athletics
Medal record
Representing Kenya
World Championships
Bronze medal – third place	1995 Gothenburg	10,000 m
Bronze medal – third place	1999 Seville	10,000 m
World Half Marathon Championships
Gold medal – first place	1997 Košice	Individual
Gold medal – first place	1998 Zürich	Individual
Gold medal – first place	1998 Zürich	Team
Gold medal – first place	1999 Palermo	Individual
Gold medal – first place	1999 Palermo	Team
Silver medal – second place	1997 Košice	Team
Bronze medal – third place	1993 Brussels	Individual
New York City Marathon
Gold medal – first place	1994 New York City	Marathon
Gold medal – first place	1995 New York City	Marathon

Tegla Chepkite Loroupe (born 9 May 1973) is a former Kenyan long-distance track and road runner. She is also a global spokeswoman for peace, women's rights and education. Loroupe holds the world records for 25 and 30 kilometers and previously held the world marathon record. She was the first African woman to hold the marathon World Record, which she held from 19 April 1998 until 30 September 2001. She is the three-time World Half-Marathon champion. Loroupe was also the first woman from Africa to win the New York City Marathon, which she has won twice. She has won marathons in London, Rotterdam, Hong Kong, Berlin and Rome.

In 2016, she was the person organizing the Refugee Team for the 2016 Summer Olympics in Rio.

== Biography ==
Tegla Loroupe was born in Kapsait village in the Lelan division of West Pokot District. It is situated in the Great Rift Valley, approximately 600 kilometres north of Nairobi. Her father and mother are from the Pokot tribe, a Nilotic ethnic group inhabiting parts of northern Kenya, eastern Uganda and southern Ethiopia.

Loroupe was told by her father that she was useless and her career might be babysitting. She grew up with 24 siblings. The Pokots being a polygamous culture, her father had four wives. She spent her childhood working fields, tending cattle and looking after younger brothers and sisters.

At the age of six, Loroupe started school at Kapsait Elementary school; she had to run ten kilometers to and from school every morning. At school, she became aware of her potential as an athlete when she won races held over a distance of 800 or 1500 meters against much older students. She decided to pursue a career as a runner. However, she was not supported by anyone but her mother.

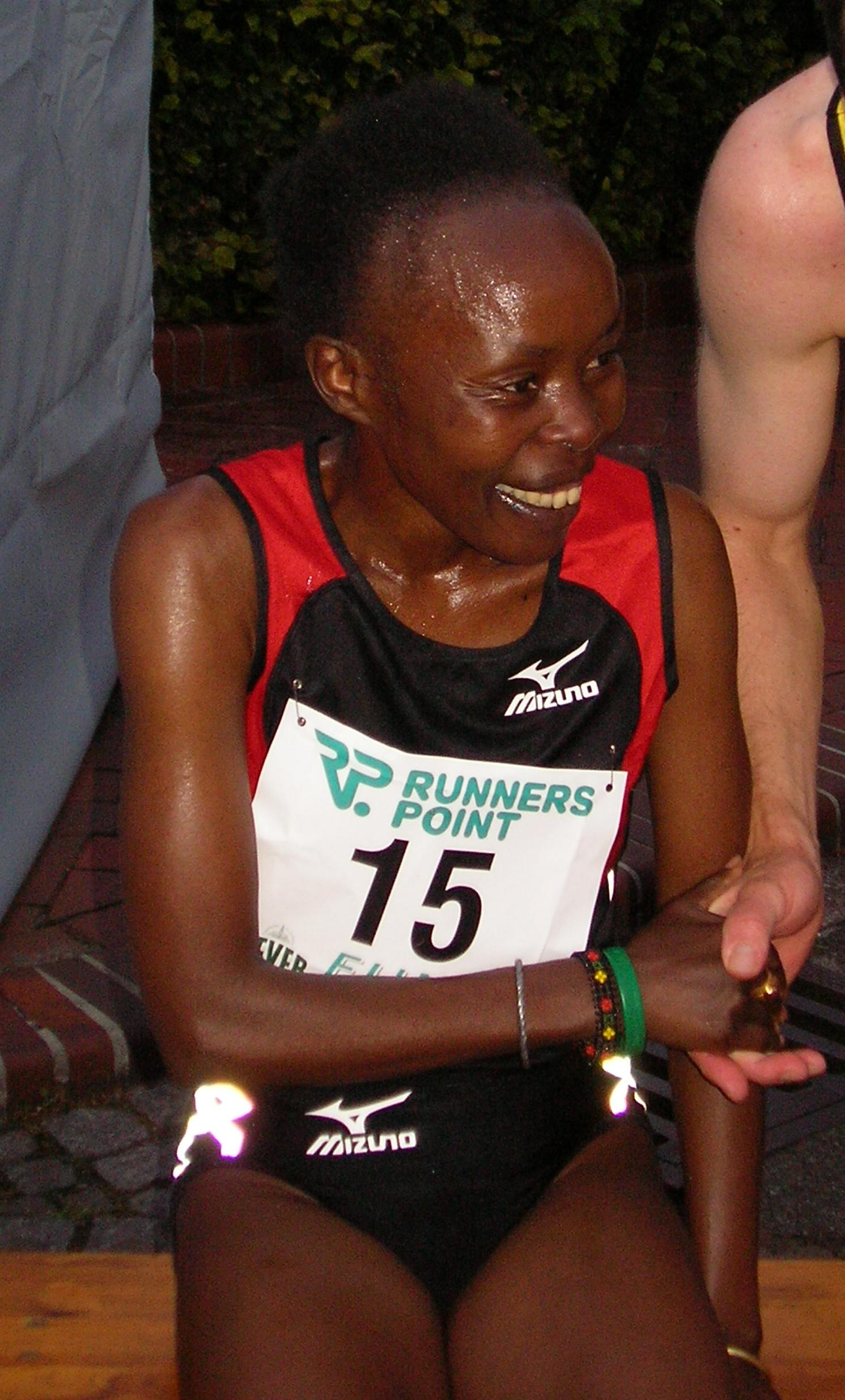
Loroupe in 2007 at a meet in Schortens, Germany.

The Kenyan athletics federation, Athletics Kenya, did not support her at first, thinking Loroupe too small and too thin. However, after she won a prestigious cross country barefoot race in 1988, this changed. She began to train to compete internationally the following year, earning her first pair of running shoes in 1989, which she wore only for particularly rough races. She was nominated for the junior race of the 1989 IAAF World Cross Country Championships finishing 28th. She competed again at the 1990 IAAF World Cross Country Championships, finishing 16th in the junior race.

In 1994 and 1998, Loroupe won the Goodwill Games over 10,000 metres, barefoot. Over the same distance she won bronze medals at the World Athletics Championships in 1995 and 1999.

In 1994, Loroupe ran her first major marathon in New York. Running against the world's strongest competition, she won. As a consequence she was idolised by many young people in Africa: at last, a woman champion to complement the many successful male runners. She won the New York City Marathon again in 1995 and finished 3rd in 1998.

Between 1997 and 1999, she won three world titles a row over the half marathon distance. She won Rotterdam Marathon three times between 1997 and 1999. She won Berlin Marathon in 1999 and finished second in 2001. She finished second at the 1999 Osaka International Ladies Marathon.

Loroupe won the Zevenheuvelenloop 15K race in the Netherland three times (1992, 1993 and 1998). She is a seven-time Egmond Half Marathon winner (1993–1998, 2000). She has won the Lisbon Half Marathon a record six times: 1994–1997, 1999 and 2000. She has won the Tilburg road race, a five times (1993, 1994, 1996, 1998, 1999), also a record number. She won the Paris Half Marathon in 1994 and 1998, City-Pier-City Loop half marathon in the Hague in 1998, and the Parelloop 10K in race in the Netherlands in 1999.

During the 2000 Summer Olympics in Sydney, favoured to win both the marathon and the 10,000 meters, she suffered from violent food poisoning the night before the race. Nevertheless, she fought through the marathon race, finishing 13th, then, the next day, ran the 10,000 metres, finishing 5th, running barefoot in both races, a feat she later stated she achieved out of a sense of duty to all the people taking her as a bearer of hope in her home country. Until the end of 2001, she continued to suffer from various health problems.

In 2000, she won London Marathon and Rome City Marathon. She also won Lausanne Marathon in 2002, Cologne Marathon in 2003 and Leipzig Marathon in 2004.

Loroupe competed at the 2005 World Championships marathon race in Helsinki, Finland, but finished only 40th. In February 2006 she won the Hong Kong Half-Marathon. The same year she finished 5th in the Rotterdam Marathon and 2nd in the Venice Marathon. In 2007, she participated again the New York City Marathon, finishing 8th.

Loroupe's biggest successes include world records over 20, 25 and 30 kilometers as well as the past record over the marathon distance. She used to hold the One Hour running World record of 18,340 m set in Borgholzhausen, Germany, but the record was broken by Dire Tune of Ethiopia ten years later, in 2008 (new record 18,517 m).

== Goodwill ==
In 2006, she was named a United Nations Ambassador of Sport by Secretary General Kofi Annan, together with Roger Federer, tennis champion from Switzerland, Elias Figueroa, Latin American soccer legend from Chile, and Katrina Webb paralympics gold medalist from Australia. She is an International Sports Ambassador for the IAAF, the International Association of Athletics Federations, and for UNICEF.

In 2003, Loroupe created an annual series of Peace Marathons sponsored by the Tegla Loroupe Peace Foundation "Peace Through Sports". Presidents, Prime Ministers, Ambassadors and government officials run with warriors and nomadic groups in her native Kenya, in Uganda and in Sudan, to bring peace to an area plagued by raiding warriors from battling tribes. In 2010 the Kenyan Government lauded her achievements as hundreds of warriors had laid down their weapons.

She has established a school (Tegla Loroupe Peace Academy) and orphanage for children from the region in Kapenguria, a high-mountain town in north-west Kenya.

The 2006 Peace Marathon was held on 18 November 2006, in Kapenguria, Kenya. Two thousand warriors from six tribes competed. The next Peace Marathon was 15 November 2008 in Kapenguria, Kenya. National ambassadors to Kenya participated, together with the Prime Minister, and several Kenyan, Tanzanian, and Ugandan Ministers. The Peace Marathon has been held each year since then, with the exception of the past two Covid years. Winners of the races often begin professional training in long-distance running, or join the training team of ex-warriors.

In February 2007, she was named the Oxfam Ambassador of Sport and Peace to Darfur. In December 2006, she travelled with George Clooney, Joey Cheek, and Don Cheadle to Beijing, Cairo, and New York on a diplomatic mission to bring an end to violence in Darfur. She won the "Community Hero" category at the 2007 Kenyan Sports Personality of the Year awards.

In November 2009, Tegla represented the Shoe4Africa team. running the New York Marathon alongside founder Toby Tanser and actress Sarah Jones finishing in 3:54:02.

Loroupe is a member of the 'Champions for Peace' club, a group of 54 famous elite athletes committed to serving peace in the world through sport, created by Peace and Sport, a Monaco-based international organisation.

As reported by Olympic news outlet Around the Rings, the IOC recognised six women, five from each continent and one to represent the world, for their achievements and their work to promote women's sport. Loroupe was awarded the world trophy.

In 2015 Loroupe became an Ambassador for the Homeless World Cup.

In 2016, she was the Chef de Mission organizing the Refugee Team for the 2016 Summer Olympics. At those games Loroupe was inducted into the Olympians for life project for her work in promoting peace. In October 2016 Loroupe was awarded United Nations Person of the Year.

== International competitions ==
Year	Competition	Venue	Position	Notes
Representing Kenya
1992	Olympic Games	Barcelona, Spain	17th	10,000 m
1993	World Championships	Stuttgart, Germany	4th	10,000 m
1995	World Championships	Gothenburg, Sweden	3rd	10,000 m
1996	Olympic Games	Atlanta, United States	6th	10,000 m
1997	World Half Marathon Championships	Košice, Slovakia	1st	Individual
1997	World Half Marathon Championships	Košice, Slovakia	2nd	Team
1997	World Championships	Gothenburg, Sweden	6th	10,000 m
1998	World Half Marathon Championships	Zürich, Switzerland	1st	Individual
1998	World Half Marathon Championships	Zürich, Switzerland	1st	Team
1999	World Half Marathon Championships	Palermo, Italy	1st	Individual
1999	World Half Marathon Championships	Palermo, Italy	1st	Team
1999	World Championships	Seville, Spain	3rd	10,000 m
2000	Olympic Games	Sydney	13th	Marathon
2000	Olympic Games	Sydney	5th	10,000 m
2005	World Championships	Helsinki, Finland	40th	Marathon

== Marathons ==
Year	Competition	Venue	Position	Notes
1994	New York City Marathon	New York City, United States	1st	Marathon
1995	New York City Marathon	New York City, United States	1st	Marathon
1996	Boston Marathon	Boston, United States	2nd	Marathon
1996	New York City Marathon	New York City, United States	7th	Marathon
1997	Rotterdam Marathon	Rotterdam, Netherlands	1st	Marathon
1997	New York City Marathon	New York City, United States	7th	Marathon
1997	Osaka International Ladies Marathon	Osaka, Japan	7th	Marathon
1998	Rotterdam Marathon	Rotterdam, Netherlands	1st	Marathon
1998	New York City Marathon	New York City, United States	3rd	Marathon
1999	Osaka International Ladies Marathon	Osaka, Japan	2nd	Marathon
1999	Rotterdam Marathon	Rotterdam, Netherlands	1st	Marathon
1999	Berlin Marathon	Berlin, Germany	1st	Marathon
2000	Rome Marathon	Rome, Italy	1st	Marathon
2000	London Marathon	London, England	1st	Marathon
2000	Sydney Marathon	Sydney, Australia	13th	Marathon
2000	New York City Marathon	New York City, United States	6th	Marathon
2001	London Marathon	London, England	8th	Marathon
2001	Berlin Marathon	Berlin, Germany	2nd	Marathon
2002	Nagoya Women's Marathon	Nagoya, Japan	7th	Marathon
2002	Lausanne Marathon	Lausanne, Switzerland	1st	Marathon
2003	Köln Marathon	Cologne, Germany	1st	Marathon
2004	Leipzig Marathon	Leipzig, Germany	1st	Marathon
2004	New York City Marathon	New York City, United States	11th	Marathon
2005	London Marathon	London, England	11th	Marathon
2005	World Athletics Championships	Helsinki, Finland	40th	Marathon
2006	Rotterdam Marathon	Rotterdam, Netherlands	5th	Marathon
2006	Venice Marathon	Venice, Italy	2nd	Marathon
2006	Mumbai Marathon	Mumbai, India	6th	Marathon
2007	The Greatest Race on Earth	Various	7th	Marathon
2007	New York City Marathon	New York City, United States	8th	Marathon
2007	Las Vegas Marathon	Las Vegas, United States	3rd	Marathon
2008	Nagano Marathon	Nagano, Japan	12th	Marathon
2009	New York City Marathon	New York City, United States	2353rd	Marathon
2011	Copenhagen Marathon	Copenhagen, Denmark	2nd	Marathon
2011	New York City Marathon	New York City, United States	30th	Marathon

Records
Preceded by (Norway) Ingrid Kristiansen	Women's Marathon World Record Holder; 19 April 1998 – 30 September 2001	Succeeded by (Japan) Naoko Takahashi
Sporting positions
Preceded by Ingrid Kristiansen; Catherina McKiernan	Zevenheuvelenloop Women's Winner (15 km); 1992 – 1993; 1998	Succeeded by Liz McColgan; Ljoebov Morgounova
Preceded by Heléna Barócsi; Irma Heeren	Egmond Women's Half Marathon Winner; 1993 – 1998; 2000	Succeeded by Irma Heeren; Susan Chepkemei
Preceded by Tanja Semjonowa	Women's Leipzig Marathon winner 2004	Succeeded by Judy Kiplimo
