= Rotterdam Marathon =

Marathon held in Rotterdam, Netherlands

- Date: April (since 1983)
- Location: Rotterdam, Netherlands
- Event type: Road
- Distance: Marathon (42.195 km)
- Primary sponsor: NN Group
- Established: 23 May 1981
- Course records: Men's: 2:03:36 (2021) (Belgium) Bashir Abdi; Women's: 2:18.56 (2026) (Ethiopia) Mekides Shimeles
- Website: Rotterdam Marathon
- Participants: 16,837 finishers (2023); 11,722 finishers (2022); 14,554 (2019)

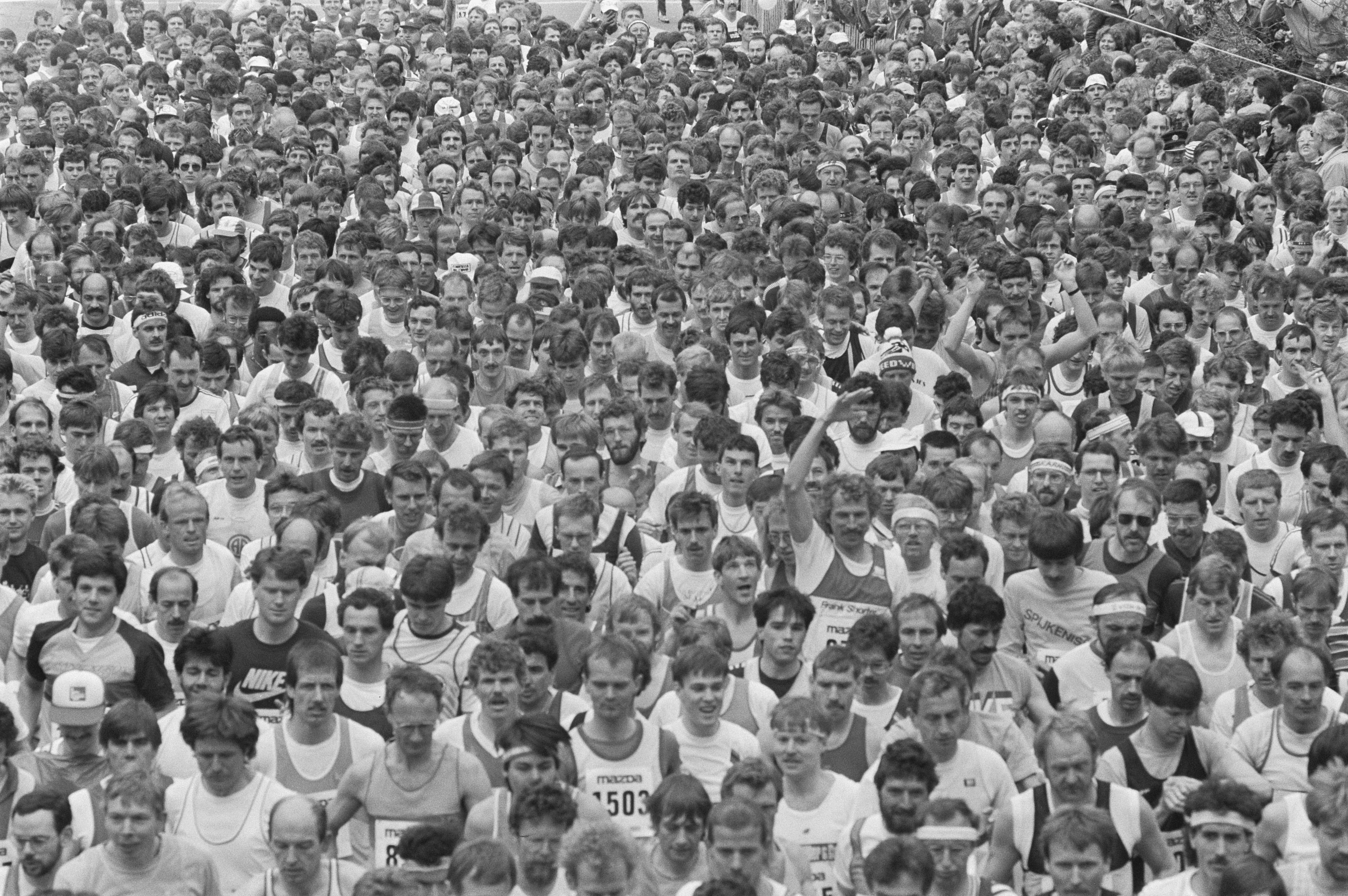
Runners at the start in 1986

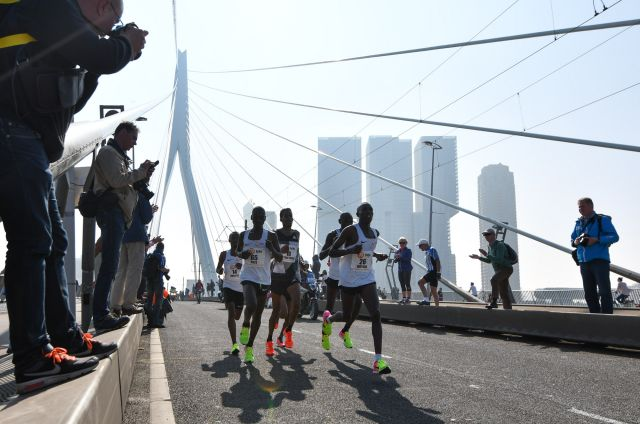
Runners on the Erasmusbrug in 2017

The Rotterdam Marathon, currently branded NN Rotterdam Marathon, is an annual marathon that has been held in Rotterdam, Netherlands since 1981. It has been held in April every year since the third edition in 1984 and attracts many top athletes. It has also been ranked as one of the top 10 marathons in the world by Runner's World magazine. The event is the most popular marathon in the Netherlands, followed by the marathons of Amsterdam and Eindhoven.

== History ==
The Rotterdam Marathon often produces very fast times, as the course is flat and weather conditions are typically favorable. Between April 1985 and September 1998 the world best time had been set at Rotterdam, by Carlos Lopes and Belayneh Dinsamo respectively. As of April 2012 six different runners ran a sub 2:05:00 time and four of the ten fastest marathon runners ever ran their fastest time in the Rotterdam Marathon.

The 2007 event was stopped after three and a half hours because of extreme weather conditions; the KNMI meteorological institute described conditions as "unseasonal" and race day was the warmest ever recorded in the city for the month of April, with temperatures reaching a high of 34 °C. Runners were on the course when the race was stopped after that point and some continued despite the warnings and race stoppage.

William Kipsang's 2008 course record of 2:05:49 was broken the following year by Duncan Kibet and James Kwambai who both ran the third fastest time ever for the distance, clocking 2:04:27.

In 2012, the IAAF Gold Label was awarded to the event, after satisfying the last condition in April that year: the requirement that the race could be followed live on television in at least five countries.

The 2020 edition of the race was postponed to 2021 due to the coronavirus pandemic, with all entries automatically remaining valid for 2021, and all registrants given the option of transferring their entry to another runner. (Note: Entrants that registered for free via a promotional code had their registrations cancelled.)

== See also ==
- List of winners of the Rotterdam Marathon
- Rotterdam Half Marathon
