= World Athletics Road Running Championships =

Biennial international road running competition

- Date: Varying
- Frequency: Inconsistent
- Country: Varying
- Inaugurated: 1992
- Most recent: Copenhagen 2026
- Next event: Yangzhou 2027

The World Athletics Road Running Championships is an international road running competition organized by World Athletics. The current format features three distances: the half marathon, 5k, and mile. The half marathon includes a team race, with athletes scoring for their national teams.

The name and format of the event have changed several times over its history. From 1992 to 2010, the championships were held annually with the half marathon as the sole race distance. (Note: In 2006 the race distance was slightly shortened to 20k.) From 2010 to 2020 the championships were held biennially. In 2023 the 5k and mile distances were introduced. The coronavirus pandemic and funding issues resulted in the cancellation of the 2022 and 2025 editions, respectively. The most recent edition was held in Copenhagen in September 2026.

The competition replaced the female-only IAAF World Women's Road Race Championships, which was held annually from 1983 to 1991.

== Editions ==
Key

Editions in gold were held as World Road Running Championships
Edition in orange denotes introduction of biennial World Athletics Half Marathon Championships

Year	Edition	Venue	Country	Date	No. of athletes (Note: Does not include entered athletes who never started.)	No. of nations
1992	1st	Tyneside	United Kingdom	19–20 September	204	36
1993	2nd	Brussels	Belgium	3 October	254	49
1994	3rd	Oslo	Norway	24 September	214	48
1995	4th	Montbéliard–Belfort	France	1 October	243	54
1996	5th	Palma de Mallorca	Spain	29 September	206	53
1997	6th	Košice	Slovakia	4 October	226	45
1998	7th	Uster	Switzerland	27 September	236	54
1999	8th	Palermo	Italy	3 October	192	48
2000	9th	Veracruz	Mexico	12 November	182	52
2001	10th	Bristol	United Kingdom	7 October	200	52
2002	11th	Brussels	Belgium	5 May	198	60
2003	12th	Vilamoura	Portugal	4 October	171	49
2004	13th	New Delhi	India	3 October	152	55
2005	14th	Edmonton	Canada	1 October	156	43
2006	15th	Debrecen	Hungary	8 October	140	39 (20 km race)
2007	16th	Udine	Italy	14 October	144	37
2008	17th	Rio de Janeiro	Brazil	12 October	155	42
2009	18th	Birmingham	United Kingdom	11 October	157	39
2010	19th	Nanning	China	16 October	123	30
2012	20th	Kavarna	Bulgaria	6 October	146	41
2014	21st	Copenhagen	Denmark	29 March	203	56
2016	22nd	Cardiff	United Kingdom	26 March	169	45
2018	23rd	Valencia	Spain	24 March	279	79 + ART
2020	24th	Gdynia	Poland	17 October	225	53 + ART
~~2022~~	~~25th~~	~~Yangzhou~~	~~China~~	~~13 November~~	cancelled due to COVID-19 pandemic	
2023	25th	Riga	Latvia	1 October	347	56 + ART
~~2025~~	~~26th~~	~~San Diego~~	~~United States~~	~~26–28 September~~	cancelled due to funding issues.	
2026	26th	Copenhagen	Denmark	19–20 September		

== History ==
The IAAF World Half Marathon Championships was first held in 1992. It comprised three races: the men's race, the women's race and the junior men's race. Furthermore, a team competition was held in each category, with the winners being decided by combining the performances of a country's top three finishers. The country with the lowest aggregate time won the team competition. The junior men's race was held in only the first and second editions, and was removed from the programme from 1994 onwards.

The competition went largely unchanged until 2006, when the competition was renamed as the IAAF World Road Running Championships. Aside from the name change, the significant difference was the distance of the race, changing from a half marathon to a 20 kilometres road race. The 20 km race featured only at the 2006 edition, and the half marathon distance returned for the 2007 World Road Running Championships.

On 29 November 2007, the IAAF announced that the name of the competition would revert to its original title of the IAAF World Half Marathon Championships, beginning with the 2008 IAAF World Half Marathon Championships in Rio de Janeiro, Brazil on 12 October 2008.

This competition is not to be confused with the IAAF World Women's Road Race Championships which were run from 1983 to 1991, or the IAAF World Road Relay Championships which took place between 1992 and 1998.

The 2020 edition of the competition was postponed due to the COVID-19 pandemic. Although it was held later that year, many countries, including Australia, Canada, Japan, New Zealand, and the U.S., declined to participate.

Similarly, the 2022 edition of the competition was postponed twice before being cancelled due to the pandemic. As a result of the cancellation, the World Athletics Council decided to award the 2027 World Athletics Road Running Championships to Yangzhou, the city originally scheduled to host the 2022 competition.

== Competition format ==
The competition is generally held every October. Runners compete on public roads which have been closed off to traffic specifically for the event. Prize money varies from US$30,000 to US$3000.

== Records ==
World Half Marathon Championships records
Type	Time	Athlete(s)	Nationality	Edition
Men's race	58:49	Jacob Kiplimo	Uganda	2020
Women's race	1:05:16; WR Wo	Peres Jepchirchir	Kenya	2020
Men's team	2:58:10	Kibiwott Kandie (58:54); Leonard Barsoton (59:34); Benard Kimeli (59:42)	Kenya	2020
Women's team	3:16:39	Yalemzerf Yehualaw (1:05:19); Zeineba Yimer (1:05:39); Ababel Yeshaneh (1:05:41)	Ethiopia	2020

World Road Running Championships records
Type	Time	Athlete(s)	Nationality	Edition
Men's race	58:59	Zersenay Tadese	Eritrea	2007
Women's race	1:06:25	Lornah Kiplagat	Netherlands	2007
Men's team	2:58:54	Patrick Makau Musyoki; Evans Cheruiyot; Robert Kipkorir Kipchumba	Kenya	2007
Women's team	3:23:33	Mary Jepkosgei Keitany; Pamela Chepchumba; Everline Kimwei	Kenya	2007

== Medalists ==
Up to 2008, non-scoring finishers for top-3 teams were also awarded medals.

Key

Medallists in gold won at the World Road Running Championships

=== Men ===
==== Half marathon ====
Year	Gold		Silver		Bronze	
1992	Benson Masya (KEN)	1:00:24	Antonio Silio (ARG)	1:00:40	Boay Akonay (TAN)	1:00:45
1993	Vincent Rousseau (BEL)	1:01:06	Steve Moneghetti (AUS)	1:01:10	Carl Thackery (GBR)	1:01:13
1994	Khalid Skah (MAR)	1:00:27	Germán Silva (MEX)	1:00:28	Ronaldo da Costa (BRA)	1:00:54
1995	Moses Tanui (KEN)	1:01:45	Paul Yego (KEN)	1:01:46	Charles Tangus (KEN)	1:01:50
1996	Stefano Baldini (ITA)	1:01:17	Josephat Kiprono (KEN)	1:01:30	Tendai Chimusasa (ZIM)	1:02:00
1997	Shem Kororia (KEN)	59:56 CR	Moses Tanui (KEN)	59:58	Kenneth Cheruiyot (KEN)	1:00:00
1998	Paul Koech (KEN)	1:00:01	Hendrick Ramaala (RSA)	1:00:24	Khalid Skah (MAR)	1:00:24
1999	Paul Tergat (KEN)	1:01:50	Hendrick Ramaala (RSA)	1:01:50	Tesfaye Jifar (ETH)	1:01:51
2000	Paul Tergat (KEN)	1:03:47	Phaustin Baha Sulle (TAN)	1:03:48	Tesfaye Jifar (ETH)	1:03:50
2001	Haile Gebrselassie (ETH)	1:00:03	Tesfaye Jifar (ETH)	1:00:04	John Yuda Msuri (TAN)	1:00:12
2002	Paul Malakwen Kosgei (KEN)	1:00:39	Jaouad Gharib (MAR)	1:00:42	John Yuda Msuri (TAN)	1:00:57
2003	Martin Lel (KEN)	1:00:49	Fabiano Joseph Naasi (TAN)	1:00:52	Martin Sulle (TAN)	1:00:56
2004	Paul Kirui (KEN)	1:02:15	Fabiano Joseph Naasi (TAN)	1:02:31	Ahmad Hassan Abdullah (QAT)	1:02:36
2005	Fabiano Joseph Naasi (TAN)	1:01:08	Mubarak Hassan Shami (QAT)	1:01:09	Yonas Kifle (ERI)	1:01:13
2006 (20 km)	Zersenay Tadese (ERI)	56:01	Robert Kipkorir Kipchumba (KEN)	56:41	Wilson Kebenei (KEN)	57:15
2007	Zersenay Tadese (ERI)	58:59	Patrick Makau Musyoki (KEN)	59:02	Evans Cheruiyot (KEN)	59:05
2008	Zersenay Tadese (ERI)	59:56 =CR	Patrick Makau Musyoki (KEN)	1:01:54	Ahmad Hassan Abdullah (QAT)	1:01:57
2009	Zersenay Tadese (ERI)	59:35 CR	Bernard Kipyego (KEN)	59:59	Dathan Ritzenhein (USA)	1:00:00
2010	Wilson Kiprop (KEN)	1:00:07	Zersenay Tadese (ERI)	1:00:11	Sammy Kitwara (KEN)	1:00:22
2012	Zersenay Tadese (ERI)	1:00:19	Deressa Chimsa (ETH)	1:00:51	John Nzau Mwangangi (KEN)	1:01:01
2014	Geoffrey Kamworor (KEN)	59:08 CR	Samuel Tsegay (ERI)	59:21	Guye Adola (ETH)	59:21
2016	Geoffrey Kamworor (KEN)	59:10	Bedan Karoki Muchiri (KEN)	59:36	Mo Farah (GBR)	59:59
2018	Geoffrey Kamworor (KEN)	1:00:02	Abraham Cheroben (BHR)	1:00:22	Aron Kifle (ERI)	1:00:31
2020	Jacob Kiplimo (UGA)	58:49	Kibiwott Kandie (KEN)	58:54	Amedework Walelegn (ETH)	59:08
2022	cancelled due to coronavirus pandemic					
2023	Sabastian Sawe (KEN)	59:10	Daniel Ebenyo (KEN)	59:14	Samwel Mailu (KEN)	59:19
2025	cancelled due to funding issues					
2026	Andreas Almgren (SWE)	58:06 CR	Nicholas Kimeli (KEN)	58:11	Joshua Cheptegei (UGA)	58:26

==== Team competition ====
Year	Gold		Silver		Bronze	
1992	Kenya; Benson Masya; Lameck Aguta; Joseph Keino	3:02:25	Great Britain; Dave Lewis; Paul Evans; Carl Thackery	3:04:5	Brazil; Artur Castro; Ronaldo da Costa; Delmir dos Santos	3:05:56
1993	Kenya; Lameck Aguta; Thomas Osano; Joseph Cheromei	3:05:40	Australia; Steve Moneghetti; John Andrews; Pat Carroll	3:05:43	Great Britain; Carl Thackery; Mark Flint; Dave Lewis	3:06:10
1994	Kenya; Godfrey Kiprotich; Shem Kororia; Andrew Masai	3:03:36	Mexico; Germán Silva; Martín Pitayo; Benjamín Paredes	3:03:47	Morocco; Khalid Skah; Salah Hissou; Abdelkadir Mouaziz	3:05:58
1995	Kenya; Moses Tanui; Paul Yego; Charles Tangus	3:05:21	Spain; Antonio Serrano; Bartolomé Serrano; Pablo Sierra	3:07:51	Italy; Vincenzo Modica; Danilo Goffi; Giacomo Leone	3:08:31
1996	Italy; Stefano Baldini; Giacomo Leone; Vincenzo Modica	3:07:42	Spain; Carlos de la Torre; Alejandro Gómez; José Manuel García	3:08:36	Japan; Toshiyuki Hayata; Masatoshi Ibata; Katsuhiko Hanada	3:08:43
1997	Kenya; Shem Kororia; Moses Tanui; Kenneth Cheruiyot	2:59:54 CR	South Africa; Hendrick Ramaala; Gert Thys; Makhosonke Fika	3:03:34	Ethiopia; Abraham Assefa; Lemma Alemayehu; Tesfaye Tola	3:03:46
1998	South Africa; Hendrick Ramaala; Gert Thys; Abner Chipu	3:02:21	Kenya; Paul Koech; Shem Kororia; John Gwako	3:03:07	Ethiopia; Ibrahim Seid; Girma Alemayehu; Addis Abebe	3:05:18
1999	South Africa; Hendrick Ramaala; Abner Chipu; Mluleki Nobanda	3:06:01	Ethiopia; Tesfaye Jifar; Tesfaye Tola; Fekadu Degefu	3:06:03	Kenya; Paul Tergat; Laban Chege; Sammy Korir	3:06:03
2000	Kenya; Paul Tergat; Joseph Kimani; David Ruto	3:11:38	Ethiopia; Tesfaye Jifar; Ibrahim Seid; Gemechu Kebede	3:14:45	Belgium; Koen Allaert; Guy Fays; Christian Nemeth	3:18:35
2001	Ethiopia; Haile Gebrselassie; Tesfaye Jifar; Tesfaye Tola	3:00:31	Kenya; Evans Rutto; Peter Kiplagat Chebet; Chris Cheboiboch	3:02:53	Tanzania; John Yuda Msuri; Phaustin Baha Sulle; Benedict Ako	3:05:08
2002	Kenya; Paul Malakwen Kosgei; Charles Kamathi; Paul Kirui	3:00:31	Japan; Atsushi Sato; Toshihide Kat; Kurao Umeki	3:02:53	Ethiopia; Tesfaye Jifa; Amebesse Tolossa; Worku Bikila	3:05:08
2003	Tanzania; Fabiano Joseph Naasi; Martin Sulle; John Yuda Msuri	3:03:01	Kenya; Martin Lel; John Cheruiyot Korir; Yusuf Songoka	3:03:09	Ethiopia; Tesfaye Tola; Dereje Adere; Mesfin Hailu	3:07:34
2004	Kenya; Paul Kirui; John Cheruiyot Korir; Wilson Kebenei	3:07:55	Ethiopia; Solomon Tsige; Alene Emere; Berhanu Addane	3:08:37	Uganda; Wilson Busienei; Martin Toroitich; Joseph Nsubuga	3:13:48
2005	Ethiopia; Sileshi Sihine; Abebe Dinkesa; Lishan Yegezu	3:06:18	Eritrea; Yonas Kifle; Yared Asmerom; Tesfayohannes Mesfin	3:07:05	Japan; Kazuo Ietani; Takayuki Matsumiya; Takanobu Otsubo	3:08:30
2006 (20 km)	Kenya; Robert Kipkorir Kipchumba; Wilson Kebenei; Wilfred Taragon	2:51:18	Eritrea; Zersenay Tadese; Yonas Kifle; Tesfayohannes Mesfin	2:53:19	Ethiopia; Deriba Merga; Tadese Tola; Demise Tsega	2:54:17
2007	Kenya; Patrick Makau Musyoki; Evans Cheruiyot; Robert Kipkorir Kipchumba	2:58:54	Eritrea; Zersenay Tadese; Yonas Kifle; Michael Tesfay	2:59:08	Ethiopia; Deriba Merga; Assefa Raji; Tariku Jufar	3:01:15
2008	Kenya; Patrick Makau Musyoki; Stephen Kipkoech Kibiwott; Joseph Maregu	3:07:24	Eritrea; Zersenay Tadese; Michael Tesfay; Mogos Ahferom	3:09:40	Qatar; Ahmad Hassan Abdullah; Essa Ismail Rashed; Ali Dawoud Sedam	3:10:52
2009	Kenya; Bernard Kipyego; Wilson Kipsang Kiprotich; Wilson Chebet	3:01:06	Eritrea; Zersenay Tadese; Samuel Tsegay; Adhanom Abraha	3:02:39	Ethiopia; Tilahun Regassa; Dereje Tesfaye; Abebe Negewo	3:06:42
2010	Kenya; Wilson Kiprop; Sammy Kitwara; Silas Kipruto	3:01:32	Eritrea; Zersenay Tadese; Samuel Tsegay; Tewelde Estifanos	3:03:04	Ethiopia; Lelisa Desisa; Birhanu Bekele; Asefa Mengstu	3:05:26
2012	Kenya; John Nzau Mwangangi; Pius Maiyo Kirop; Stephen Kosgei Kibet	3:03:52	Eritrea; Zersenay Tadese; Tewelde Estifanos; Kiflom Sium	3:04:41	Ethiopia; Deressa Chimsa; Belay Assefa; Habtamu Assefa	3:05:43
2014	Eritrea; Samuel Tsegay; Zersenay Tadese; Nguse Tesfaldet Amlosom	2:58:59 CR	Kenya; Geoffrey Kamworor; Wilson Kiprop; Kenneth Kipkemoi	2:59:38	Ethiopia; Guye Adola; Adugna Takele; Bonsa Dida	3:00:48
2016	Kenya; Geoffrey Kamworor; Bedan Karoki Muchiri; Simon Cheprot	2:58:58 CR	Ethiopia; Abayneh Ayele; Tamirat Tola; Mule Wasihun	3:01:16	Eritrea; Abrar Osman; Nguse Tesfaldet Amlosom; Hiskel Tewelde	3:06:18
2018	Ethiopia; Jemal Yimer; Getaneh Molla; Betesfa Getahun	3:02:14	Kenya; Geoffrey Kamworor; Leonard Barsoton; Barselius Kipyego	3:02:40	Bahrain; Abraham Cheroben; Aweke Ayalew; Albert Rop	3:02:52
2020	Kenya; Kibiwott Kandie; Leonard Barsoton; Benard Kimeli	2:58:10	Ethiopia; Amedework Walelegn; Andamlak Belihu; Leul Gebresilase	2:58:25	Uganda; Jacob Kiplimo; Joshua Cheptegei; Victor Kiplangat	2:58:39
2022	cancelled due to coronavirus pandemic					
2023	Kenya; Sabastian Sawe; Daniel Ebenyo; Samwel Mailu	2:57:43	Ethiopia; Jemal Yimer Mekonnen; Nibret Melak; Tsegay Kidanu	2:59:54	South Africa; Thabang Mosiako; Stephen Mokoka; Elroy Gelant	3:01.17
2025	cancelled due to funding issues					
2026	Kenya; Nicholas Kimeli; Gideon Rono; Alex Matata	2:56:30 CR	Ethiopia; Tadese Worku; Belay Bezabeh; Bereket Nega	2:59:47	United States; Conner Mantz; Ahmed Muhumed; Wesley Kiptoo	3:01:34

==== 5km ====
Year	Gold		Silver		Bronze	
2023	Hagos Gebrhiwet (ETH)	12:59 CR	Yomif Kejelcha (ETH)	13:02	Nicholas Kimeli (KEN)	13:16
2025	cancelled due to funding issues					
2026	Dawit Seare (ERI)	12:56 CR	Jakob Ingebrigtsen (NOR)	12:59	Saymon Amanuel (ERI)	13:00

==== Road Mile ====
Year	Gold		Silver		Bronze	
2023	Hobbs Kessler (USA)	3:56.13 WR	Callum Elson (GBR)	3:56.41 AR	Samuel Prakel (USA)	3:56.43
2025	cancelled due to funding issues					
2026	Robert Farken (GER)	3:51.80 CR	Yared Nuguse (USA)	3:52.33	Ruben Querinjean (LUX)	3:52.77

=== Women ===
==== Half marathon ====
Year	Gold		Silver		Bronze	
1992	Liz McColgan (GBR)	1:08:53	Megumi Fujiwara (JPN)	1:09:21	Rosanna Munerotto (ITA)	1:09:38
1993	Conceição Ferreira (POR)	1:10:07	Mari Tanigawa (JPN)	1:10:09	Tegla Loroupe (KEN)	1:10:12
1994	Elana Meyer (RSA)	1:08:36 CR	Iulia Olteanu (ROU)	1:09:15	Anuța Cătună (ROU)	1:09:35
1995	Valentina Yegorova (RUS)	1:09:58	Cristina Pomacu (ROU)	1:10:22	Anuța Cătună (ROU)	1:10:28
1996	Ren Xiujuan (CHN)	1:10:39	Lidia Șimon (ROU)	1:10:57	Aurica Buia (ROU)	1:11:01
1997	Tegla Loroupe (KEN)	1:08:14 CR	Cristina Pomacu (ROU)	1:08:43	Lidia Șimon (ROU)	1:09:05
1998	Tegla Loroupe (KEN)	1:08:29	Elana Meyer (RSA)	1:08:32	Lidia Șimon (ROU)	1:08:58
1999	Tegla Loroupe (KEN)	1:08:48	Mizuki Noguchi (JPN)	1:09:12	Catherine Ndereba (KEN)	1:09:23
2000	Paula Radcliffe (GBR)	1:09:07	Susan Chepkemei (KEN)	1:09:40	Lidia Șimon (ROU)	1:10:24
2001	Paula Radcliffe (GBR)	1:06:47 CR	Susan Chepkemei (KEN)	1:07:36	Berhane Adere (ETH)	1:08:17
2002	Berhane Adere (ETH)	1:09:06	Susan Chepkemei (KEN)	1:09:13	Jeļena Prokopčuka (LAT)	1:09:15
2003	Paula Radcliffe (GBR)	1:07:35	Berhane Adere (ETH)	1:09:02	Benita Willis (AUS)	1:09:26
2004	Sun Yingjie (CHN)	1:08:40	Lydia Cheromei (KEN)	1:09:00	Constantina Diță (ROU)	1:09:07
2005	Constantina Diță (ROU)	1:09:17	Lornah Kiplagat (NED)	1:10:19	Susan Chepkemei (KEN)	1:10:20
2006 (20 km)	Lornah Kiplagat (NED)	1:03:21 WR	Constantina Diță (ROU)	1:03:23	Rita Jeptoo (KEN)	1:03:47
2007	Lornah Kiplagat (NED)	1:06:25 WR_{wo}	Mary Jepkosgei Keitany (KEN)	1:06:48	Pamela Chepchumba (KEN)	1:08:06
2008	Lornah Kiplagat (NED)	1:08:37	Aselefech Mergia (ETH)	1:09:57	Pamela Chepchumba (KEN)	1:10:01
2009	Mary Jepkosgei Keitany (KEN)	1:06:36 CR	Philes Ongori (KEN)	1:07:38	Aberu Kebede (ETH)	1:07:39
2010	Florence Kiplagat (KEN)	1:08:24	Dire Tune (ETH)	1:08:34	Peninah Arusei (KEN)	1:09:05
2012	Meseret Hailu (ETH)	1:08:55	Feyse Tadese (ETH)	1:08:56	Paskalia Chepkorir Kipkoech (KEN)	1:09:04
2014	Gladys Cherono Kiprono (KEN)	1:07:29	Mary Wacera Ngugi (KEN)	1:07:44	Sally Chepyego Kaptich (KEN)	1:07:52
2016	Peres Jepchirchir (KEN)	1:07:31	Cynthia Jerotich Limo (KEN)	1:07:34	Mary Wacera Ngugi (KEN)	1:07:54
2018	Netsanet Gudeta (ETH)	1:06:11 WR_{wo}	Joyciline Jepkosgei (KEN)	1:06:54	Pauline Kaveke Kamulu (KEN)	1:06:56
2020	Peres Jepchirchir (KEN)	1:05:16 WR_{wo}	Melat Yisak Kejeta (GER)	1:05:18	Yalemzerf Yehualaw (ETH)	1:05:19
2022	cancelled due to coronavirus pandemic					
2023	Peres Jepchirchir (KEN)	1:07.25	Margaret Kipkemboi (KEN)	1:07.26	Catherine Amanang'ole (KEN)	1:07.34
2025	cancelled due to funding issues					
2026	Agnes Jebet Ngetich (KEN)	1:05:15 WR_{wo}	Veronica Loleo (KEN)	1:06:05	Florence Niyonkuru (RWA)	1:06:08

==== Team competition ====
Year	Gold		Silver		Bronze	
1992	Japan; Megumi Fujiwara; Miyoko Asahina; Eriko Asai	3:30:39	Great Britain; Liz McColgan; Andrea Wallace; Suzanne Rigg	3:33:05	Romania; Anuța Cătună; Iulia Olteanu; Aurica Buia	3:33:27
1993	Romania; Elena Murgoci; Anuța Cătună; Iulia Olteanu	3:32:18	Japan; Mari Tanigawa; Miyoko Asahina; Akari Takemoto	3:32:22	Portugal; Conceição Ferreira; Albertina Machado; Rosa Oliveira	3:34:12
1994	Romania; Iulia Olteanu; Anuța Cătună; Elena Fidatov	3:29:03 CR	Norway; Hilde Stavik; Brynhild Synstnes; Grete Kirkeberg	3:33:36	Japan; Mari Tanigawa; Mineko Watanabe; Yukari Komatsu	3:35:39
1995	Romania; Cristina Pomacu; Anuța Cătună; Elena Fidatov	3:31:29	Russia; Valentina Yegorova; Alla Zhilyaeva; Firaya Sultanova-Zhdanova	3:33:12	Spain; Ana Isabel Alonso; Rocío Ríos; Carmen Fuentes	3:34:26
1996	Romania; Lidia Șimon; Aurica Buia; Nuța Olaru	3:33:05	France; Christine Mallo; Zahia Dahmani; Muriel Linsolas	3:38:44	Italy; Lucilla Andreucci; Annalisa Scurti; Sonia Maccioni	3:41:28
1997	Romania; Cristina Pomacu; Lidia Șimon; Nuța Olaru	3:27:40 CR	Kenya; Tegla Loroupe; Joyce Chepchumba; Delilah Asiago	3:27:57	Japan; Mari Sotani; Noriko Geji; Hiromi Katayama	3:31:38
1998	Kenya; Tegla Loroupe; Joyce Chepchumba; Leah Malot	3:29:43	Romania; Lidia Șimon; Cristina Pomacu; Constantina Diță	3:32:19	Spain; Julia Vaquero; María Luisa Larraga; Rocío Ríos	3:34:18
1999	Kenya; Tegla Loroupe; Catherine Ndereba; Joyce Chepchumba	3:27:40 =CR	Japan; Mizuki Noguchi; Reiko Tosa; Hiromi Katayama	3:30:06	Russia; Valentina Yegorova; Lyudmila Biktasheva; Alina Ivanova	3:31:49
2000	Romania; Lidia Șimon; Mihaela Botezan; Cristina Pomacu	3:34:22	Japan; Mizuki Noguchi; Yukiko Okamoto; Yasuko Hashimoto	3:36:25	Russia; Lidiya Grigoryeva; Galina Aleksandrova; Zinaida Semenova	3:45:41
2001	Kenya; Susan Chepkemei; Isabella Ochichi; Caroline Kwambai	3:28:04	Japan; Mizuki Noguchi; Yasuyo Iwamoto; Takako Kotorida	3:30:08	Ethiopia; Berhane Adere; Meseret Kotu; Teyba Erkesso	3:30:20
2002	Kenya; Susan Chepkemei; Pamela Chepchumba; Lenah Cheruiyot	3:28:22	Russia; Svetlana Zakharova; Lyudmila Petrova; Irina Safarova	3:30:05	Ethiopia; Berhane Adere; Asha Gigi; Leila Aman	3:30:58
2003	Russia; Lidiya Grigoryeva; Alla Zhilyaeva; Lyudmila Biktasheva	3:30:16	Japan; Mikie Takanaka; Takako Kotorida; Risa Hagiwara	3:34:23	Romania; Constantina Diță; Luminița Talpoș; Nuța Olaru	3:35:07
2004	Ethiopia; Eyerusalem Kuma; Bezunesh Bekele; Teyba Erkesso	3:36:00	Romania; Constantina Diță; Mihaela Botezan; Luminița Talpoș	3:36:08	Russia; Irina Timofeyeva; Alina Ivanova; Yelena Burykina	3:38:21
2005	Romania; Constantina Diță; Mihaela Botezan; Nuța Olaru	3:31:00	Russia; Galina Bogomolova; Lidiya Grigoryeva; Irina Timofeyeva	3:33:05	Japan; Terumi Asoshina; Hiromi Ominami; Yoko Yagi	3:35:42
2006 (20 km)	Kenya; Rita Jeptoo; Edith Masai; Eunice Jepkorir	3:15:55	Ethiopia; Dire Tune; Teyba Erkesso; Ashu Kasim	3:18:50	Japan; Kayoko Fukushi; Yurika Nakamura; Ryoko Kizaki	3:19:00
2007	Kenya; Mary Jepkosgei Keitany; Pamela Chepchumba; Everline Kimwei	3:23:33	Ethiopia; Bezunesh Bekele; Atsede Habtamu; Atsede Baysa	3:25:51	Japan; Chisato Osaki; Akane Taira; Yoshimi Ozaki	3:27:39
2008	Ethiopia; Aselefech Mergia; Genet Getaneh; Abebu Gelan	3:30:59	Kenya; Pamela Chepchumba; Peninah Arusei; Julia Mumbi Muraga	3:31:24	Japan; Yukiko Akaba; Miki Ohira; Yuko Machida	3:40:58
2009^{†}	Kenya; Mary Jepkosgei Keitany; Philes Ongori; Caroline Kilel	3:22:30 CR	Ethiopia; Aberu Kebede; Mestawet Tufa; Tirfi Tsegaye	3:26:14	Japan; Yurika Nakamura; Ryoko Kizaki; Remi Nakazato	3:31:31
2010	Kenya; Florence Kiplagat; Peninah Arusei; Joyce Chepkirui	3:26:59	Ethiopia; Dire Tune; Feyse Tadese; Meseret Mengistu	3:27:33	Japan; Yoshimi Ozaki; Ryoko Kizaki; Azusa Nojiri	3:33:40
2012	Ethiopia; Meseret Hailu; Feyse Tadese; Emebt Etea	3:27:52	Kenya; Paskalia Chepkorir Kipkoech; Lydia Cheromei; Pauline Njeri Kahenya	3:28:39	Japan; Tomomi Tanaka; Mai Ito; Asami Kato	3:34:45
2014	Kenya; Gladys Cherono Kiprono; Mary Wacera Ngugi; Sally Chepyego Kaptich	3:23:05	Ethiopia; Netsanet Gudeta; Tsehay Desalegn; Genet Yalew	3:27:05	Japan; Sayo Nomura; Risa Takenaka; Reia Iwade	3:31:33
2016	Kenya; Peres Jepchirchir; Cynthia Jerotich Limo; Mary Wacera Ngugi	3:22:59	Ethiopia; Netsanet Gudeta; Genet Yalew; Dihininet Demsew Jara	3:26:29	Japan; Yuka Ando; Miho Shimizu; Mizuki Matsuda	3:32:25
2018	Ethiopia; Netsanet Gudeta; Zeineba Yimer; Meseret Belete	3:22:27 CR	Kenya; Joyciline Jepkosgei; Pauline Kaveke Kamulu; Ruth Chepngetich	3:23:02	Bahrain; Eunice Chumba; Desi Mokonin; Dalila Abdulkadir	3:23:39
2020	Ethiopia; Yalemzerf Yehualaw; Zeineba Yimer; Ababel Yeshaneh	3:16:39 CR	Kenya; Peres Jepchirchir; Joyciline Jepkosgei; Brillian Jepkorir Kipkoech	3:18:10	Germany; Melat Yisak Kejeta; Laura Hottenrott; Rabea Schöneborn	3:28:42
2022	cancelled due to coronavirus pandemic					
2023	Kenya; Peres Jepchirchir; Margaret Kipkemboi; Catherine Amanang'ole	3:22.25	Ethiopia; Tsigie Gebreselama; Ftaw Zeray; Yalemget Yaregal	3:27.55	United Kingdom; Calli Thackery; Samantha Harrison; Clara Evans	3:29:15
2025	cancelled due to funding issues					
2026	Kenya; Agnes Jebet Ngetich; Veronica Loleo; Daisilah Jerono	3:17:33	United States; Emma Grace Hurley; Weini Kelati; Jessica McClain	3:19:51	Ethiopia; Ftaw Zeray; Meselech Alemayehu; Baraky Redae	3:22:40

^{†}: In 2009, the team from Russia was initially ranked 3rd (3:31:23), but fell behind Japan after the disqualification of Inga Abitova. Her competition results were annulled, beginning October 10, 2009, because of breaking anti-doping regulations.

==== 5km ====
Year	Gold		Silver		Bronze	
2023	Beatrice Chebet (KEN)	14:35 CR	Lillian Kasait Rengeruk (KEN)	14:39	Ejgayehu Taye (ETH)	14:40
2025	cancelled due to funding issues					
2026	Likina Amebaw (ETH)	14:41	Caroline Gitonga (KEN)	14:48	Rose Davies (AUS)	14:50

==== Road Mile ====
Year	Gold		Silver		Bronze	
2023	Diribe Welteji (ETH)	4:20.98 WR	Freweyni Hailu (ETH)	4:23.06	Faith Kipyegon (KEN)	4:24.13
2025	cancelled due to funding issues					
2026	Agathe Guillemot (FRA)	4:22.74	Freweyni Hailu (ETH)	4:24.35	Mirriam Cherop (KEN)	4:25.71

=== Junior men ===
==== Individual ====
Year	Gold		Silver		Bronze	
1992	Kassa Tadesse (ETH)	1:04:51	Meck Mothuli (RSA)	1:05:01	Francesco Ingargiola (ITA)	1:05:18
1993	Meck Mothuli (RSA)	1:02:11	Biruk Bekele (ETH)	1:03:32	Isaac Radebe (RSA)	1:03:35

==== Team competition ====
Year	Gold		Silver		Bronze	
1992	Italy	3:17:39	Ethiopia	3:18:56	South Africa	3:20:04
1993	South Africa	3:09:46	Ethiopia	3:13:34	Italy	3:17:12

== All-time medal table ==
Updated after the 2023 World Athletics Road Running Championships.

Rank	Nation	Gold	Silver	Bronze	Total
1	Kenya	52	31	22	105
2	Ethiopia	15	24	20	59
3	Romania	8	7	9	24
4	Eritrea	6	9	3	18
5	South Africa	5	5	3	13
6	Great Britain	4	3	4	11
7	Netherlands	3	1	0	4
8	Italy	3	0	5	8
9	Tanzania	2	3	5	10
10	Russia	2	3	3	8
11	China	2	0	0	2
12	Japan	1	9	13	23
13	Morocco	1	1	2	4
14	Uganda	1	0	2	3
14	United States	1	0	2	3
16	Belgium	1	0	1	2
16	Portugal	1	0	1	2
18	Spain	0	2	2	4
19	Australia	0	2	1	3
20	Mexico	0	2	0	2
21	Qatar	0	1	3	4
22	Bahrain	0	1	2	3
23	Germany	0	1	1	2
24	Argentina	0	1	0	1
24	France	0	1	0	1
24	Norway	0	1	0	1
27	Brazil	0	0	2	2
28	Latvia	0	0	1	1
28	Zimbabwe	0	0	1	1
Totals (29 entries)		108	108	108	324

Source: 2023 World Athletics Road Running Championships Facts and Figures
