= 2012 IAAF World Half Marathon Championships =

- Host city: Kavarna, Dobrich, Bulgaria
- Nations: 41
- Athletes: 146
- Events: 2
- Dates: 6 October 2012
- Race length: 21.0975 km (13.1 mi)

The 2012 IAAF World Half Marathon Championships were held in Kavarna, Bulgaria on 6 October 2012.

Detailed reports on the event and an appraisal of the results were given.

Complete results were published for the men's, and the women's race, as well as the men's team, and the women's team.

== Medallists ==
Event	Gold		Silver		Bronze	
Individual
Men	Zersenay Tadese (ERI)	1:00:19	Deressa Chimsa (ETH)	1:00:51	John Nzau Mwangangi (KEN)	1:01:01
Women	Meseret Hailu (ETH)	1:08:55	Feyse Tadese (ETH)	1:08:56	Paskalia Chepkorir Kipkoech (KEN)	1:09:04
Team
Men	Kenya	3:03:52	Eritrea	3:04:41	Ethiopia	3:05:43
Women	Ethiopia	3:27:52	Kenya	3:28:39	Japan	3:34:45

== Race results ==
=== Men's ===
Individual
Rank	Athlete	Nationality	Time	Notes
Gold medal	Zersenay Tadese	Eritrea	1:00:19	
Silver medal	Deressa Chimsa	Ethiopia	1:00:51	PB
Bronze medal	John Nzau Mwangangi	Kenya	1:01:01	
4	Pius Maiyo Kirop	Kenya	1:01:11	
5	Stephen Kosgei Kibet	Kenya	1:01:40	
6	Eliud Kipchoge	Kenya	1:01:52	
7	Jackson Kiprop	Uganda	1:02:05	
8	Stephen Mokoka	South Africa	1:02:06	
9	Tewelde Estifanos	ERI	1:02:10	SB
10	Kiflom Sium	ERI	1:02:12	SB
11	Belay Assefa	ETH	1:02:17	
12	Robert Kajuga	RWA	1:02:22	
13	Mulue Andom	ERI	1:02:23	
14	Giovani dos Santos	BRA	1:02:32	
15	Augustus Maiyo	USA	1:02:33	PB
16	Habtamu Assefa	ETH	1:02:35	
17	Luke Puskedra	USA	1:02:46	
18	Gladwin Mzazi	RSA	1:03:46	
19	Nathan Ayeko	UGA	1:03:54	
20	Jean Damascéne Habarurema	FRA	1:03:59	
21	Yuki Kawauchi	JPN	1:04:04	
22	Cyriaque Ndayikengurukiye	RWA	1:04:05	PB
23	Liam Adams	AUS	1:04:08	
24	Harry Summers	AUS	1:04:13	
25	Debesay Tsige	ERI	1:04:15	PB
26	Solomon Mutai	UGA	1:04:21	
27	James Kibocha Theuri	FRA	1:04:33	
28	Ian Burrell	USA	1:04:37	
29	Tsuyoshi Ugachi	JPN	1:04:49	SB
30	Alebachew Debas	ETH	1:04:52	
31	Benjamin Malaty	FRA	1:05:17	
32	Tilahun Aliyev	AZE	1:05:34	NR
33	Jaume Leiva	ESP	1:05:36	
34	Paul Pollock	IRL	1:05:38	
35	Naoki Okamoto	JPN	1:05:40	
36	Scott Smith	USA	1:05:46	
37	Javier Díaz	ESP	1:06:06	
38	Jean Marie Uwajeneza	RWA	1:06:07	PB
39	Andrey Petrov	UZB	1:06:16	
40	Wissem Hosni	TUN	1:06:34	SB
41	Raúl Machacuay	PER	1:06:38	SB
42	Stéphane Lefrand	FRA	1:06:38	
43	Artur Kozłowski	POL	1:06:47	SB
44	Abdi Hakin Ulad	DEN	1:06:53	PB
45	Constantino León	PER	1:06:58	
46	Djamel Bachiri	FRA	1:07:03	SB
47	Godiraone Nthompe	BOT	1:07:14	SB
48	Rapula Diphoko	BOT	1:07:17	SB
49	Modike Lucky Mohale	RSA	1:07:17	
50	Chang Chia-Che	TPE	1:07:21	SB
51	Clinton Perrett	AUS	1:07:31	
52	Carlos Cordero	MEX	1:07:42	
53	Sylvain Rukundo	RWA	1:07:44	
54	Kristof Shaanika	NAM	1:07:55	PB
55	Oscar Cerón	MEX	1:07:56	
56	Francisco Caluvi	ANG	1:08:19	
57	Yolo Nikolov	BUL	1:08:32	PB
58	Chihiro Miyawaki	JPN	1:08:33	
59	Michael Eaton	USA	1:08:52	
60	Daniel Vargas	MEX	1:08:56	
61	Johan Damkjaer	DEN	1:09:01	
62	Peter Bech	DEN	1:09:13	
63	José Francisco Chaves	CRC	1:09:27	
64	Su Guoxiong	CHN	1:09:58	SB
65	Ulrik Heitmann Jensen	DEN	1:09:59	
66	Dimcho Mitsov	BUL	1:11:11	SB
67	Masato Kihara	JPN	1:11:31	
68	Gi Ka Man	HKG	1:11:35	
69	Alfonzo Paula Acosta	DOM	1:11:44	PB
70	Shaban Mustafa	BUL	1:12:02	SB
71	Boris Simonov	ARM	1:12:07	PB
72	Rui Yong Soh	SIN	1:12:12	PB
73	Ilir Kellezi	ALB	1:13:59	SB
74	Sangay Wangchuk	BHU	1:15:19	NR
75	Franco Forestier	URU	1:15:33	
76	Yordan Petrov	BUL	1:18:47	
77	Nikola Mikulic	CRO	1:25:50	
78	Weng U Chan	MAC	1:26:03	PB
—	Gilmar Lopes	BRA	DNF	
—	José Márcio da Silva	BRA	DNF	
—	Philemon Kimeli Limo	KEN	DNF	
—	Raji Assefa	ETH	DNF	
—	Jhon Cusi	PER	DNF	
—	Aleksandar Kiradjiev	Macedonia	DNF	
—	Luis Fernando Paula	BRA	DNF	
—	Hristo Stefanov	BUL	DNF	

=== Women's ===
Individual
Rank	Athlete	Nationality	Time	Notes
Gold medal	Meseret Hailu	Ethiopia	1:08:55	PB
Silver medal	Feyse Tadese	Ethiopia	1:08:56	SB
Bronze medal	Paskalia Chepkorir Kipkoech	Kenya	1:09:04	
4	Lydia Cheromei	Kenya	1:09:13	
5	Emebt Etea	Ethiopia	1:10:01	PB
6	Pauline Njeri Kahenya	Kenya	1:10:22	
7	Gemma Steel	United Kingdom	1:11:09	PB
8	Tomomi Tanaka	Japan	1:11:09	
9	Mai Ito	JPN	1:11:25	
10	Caryl Jones	GBR	1:11:52	PB
11	Sabrina Mockenhaupt	GER	1:12:04	SB
12	Asami Kato	JPN	1:12:11	
13	Maegan Krifchin	USA	1:12:29	
14	Lara Tamsett	AUS	1:12:58	SB
15	Yoko Miyauchi	JPN	1:13:00	
16	René Kalmer	RSA	1:13:16	
17	Derbe Godana	ETH	1:13:16	PB
18	Adriana Nelson	USA	1:13:30	SB
19	Kayo Sugihara	JPN	1:13:36	
20	Karolina Jarzynska	POL	1:13:45	
21	Priscah Jepleting Cherono	KEN	1:13:55	
22	Susan Partridge	GBR	1:13:55	
23	Azucena Díaz	ESP	1:14:05	SB
24	Carmen Oliveras	FRA	1:14:28	SB
25	Shalane Flanagan	USA	1:14:41	
26	Sara Prieto	MEX	1:15:03	PB
27	Tonya Nero	TRI	1:15:13	NR
28	Nyakisi Adero	UGA	1:15:26	SB
29	Zhang Jingxia	CHN	1:15:51	PB
30	Peninah Jerop Arusei	KEN	1:15:55	
31	Magali Bernard	FRA	1:16:25	
32	Michelle Frey	USA	1:16:55	
33	Alvina Begay	USA	1:16:58	
34	Eden Tesfalem	ERI	1:17:01	SB
35	Marisol Romero	MEX	1:17:17	SB
36	Sueli Silva	BRA	1:17:31	
37	Nolene Conrad	RSA	1:17:51	
38	Xiao Huimiin	CHN	1:18:16	PB
39	Sirlene de Pinho	BRA	1:18:30	
40	Lavinia Haitope	NAM	1:18:36	PB
41	Adriana da Luz	BRA	1:18:44	
42	Amira Ben Amor	TUN	1:19:01	
43	Selam Abere	ETH	1:19:09	PB
44	Maritza Arenas	MEX	1:19:25	
45	Lene Hjelmsø	DEN	1:19:32	
46	Christine Kalmer	RSA	1:19:40	
47	Anne Holm Baumeister	DEN	1:20:04	
48	Rozelaine Silva	BRA	1:20:53	
49	Rocío Cántara	PER	1:21:07	
50	Matea Matosevic	CRO	1:21:33	
51	Anita Krasteva	BUL	1:21:56	PB
52	Cristina Alexandra Frumuz	ROU	1:22:42	
53	Sitora Hamidova	UZB	1:23:12	
54	Hui QiHui Qi	SIN	1:23:16	NR
55	Silviya Danekova	BUL	1:24:07	
56	Iveta Bonova	BUL	1:25:02	PB
57	Chow Chi Ngan	HKG	1:29:02	SB
58	Cynthia Ruiz	PER	1:29:12	
59	Lap Ian Chang	MAC	1:39:55	PB
—	Andreina De La Rosa	DOM	DNF	
—	Patricia Morceli Bühler	SUI	DNS	

== Team results ==
=== Men's ===
Team
Rank	Country	Team	Time
Gold medal	Kenya	John Nzau Mwangangi; Pius Maiyo Kirop; Stephen Kosgei Kibet	3:03:52
Silver medal	Eritrea	Zersenay Tadese; Tewelde Estifanos; Kiflom Sium	3:04:41
Bronze medal	Ethiopia	Deressa Chimsa; Belay Assefa; Habtamu Assefa	3:05:43
4	United States	Augustus Maiyo; Luke Puskedra; Ian Burrell	3:09:56
5	Uganda	Jackson Kiprop; Nathan Ayeko; Solomon Mutai	3:10:20
6	Rwanda	Robert Kajuga; Cyriaque Ndayikengurukiye; Jean Marie Uwajeneza	3:12:34
7	South Africa	Stephen Mokoka; Gladwin Mzazi; Modike Lucky Mohale	3:13:09
8	France	Jean Damascéne Habarurema; James Kibocha Theuri; Benjamin Malaty	3:13:49
9	Japan	Yuki Kawauchi; Tsuyoshi Ugachi; Naoki Okamoto	3:14:33
10	Australia	Liam Adams; Harry Summers; Clinton Perrett	3:15:52
11	Mexico	Carlos Cordero; Oscar Cerón; Daniel Vargas	3:24:34
12	Denmark	Abdi Hakin Ulad; Johan Damkjaer; Peter Bech	3:25:07
13	Bulgaria	Yolo Nikolov; Dimcho Mitsov; Shaban Mustafa	3:31:45

=== Women's ===
Team
Rank	Country	Team	Time
Gold medal	Ethiopia	Meseret Hailu; Feyse Tadese; Emebt Etea	3:27:52
Silver medal	Kenya	Paskalia Chepkorir Kipkoech; Lydia Cheromei; Pauline Njeri Kahenya	3:28:39
Bronze medal	Japan	Tomomi Tanaka; Mai Ito; Asami Kato	3:34:45
4	United Kingdom	Gemma Steel; Caryl Jones; Susan Partridge	3:36:56
5	United States	Maegan Krifchin; Adriana Nelson; Shalane Flanagan	3:40:40
6	South Africa	René Kalmer; Nolene Conrad; Christine Kalmer	3:50:47
7	Mexico	Sara Prieto; Marisol Romero; Maritza Arenas	3:51:45
8	Brazil	Sueli Silva; Sirlene de Pinho; Adriana da Luz	3:54:45
9	Bulgaria	Anita Krasteva; Silviya Danekova; Iveta Bonova	4:11:05

== Participation ==
An unofficial count yields the participation of 146 athletes from 41 countries. Although announced, athletes from Switzerland did not show.

- Albania (1)
- Angola (1)
- Armenia (1)
- Australia (4)
- Azerbaijan (1)
- Bhutan (1)
- Botswana (2)
- Brazil (8)
- Bulgaria (8)
- China (3)
- Chinese Taipei (1)
- Costa Rica (1)
- Croatia (2)
- Denmark (6)
- Dominican Republic (2)
- Eritrea (6)
- Ethiopia (10)
- France (7)
- Germany (1)
- Hong Kong (2)
- Ireland (1)
- Japan (10)
- Kenya (10)
- Macau (2)
- Macedonia (1)
- Mexico (6)
- Namibia (2)
- Peru (5)
- Poland (2)
- Romania (1)
- Rwanda (4)
- Singapore (2)
- South Africa (6)
- Spain (3)
- Trinidad and Tobago (1)
- Tunisia (2)
- Uganda (4)
- United Kingdom (3)
- United States (10)
- Uruguay (1)
- Uzbekistan (2)

== See also ==
- 2012 in athletics (track and field)
