= Pauline Njeri Kahenya =

Kenyan long-distance runner (born 1985)

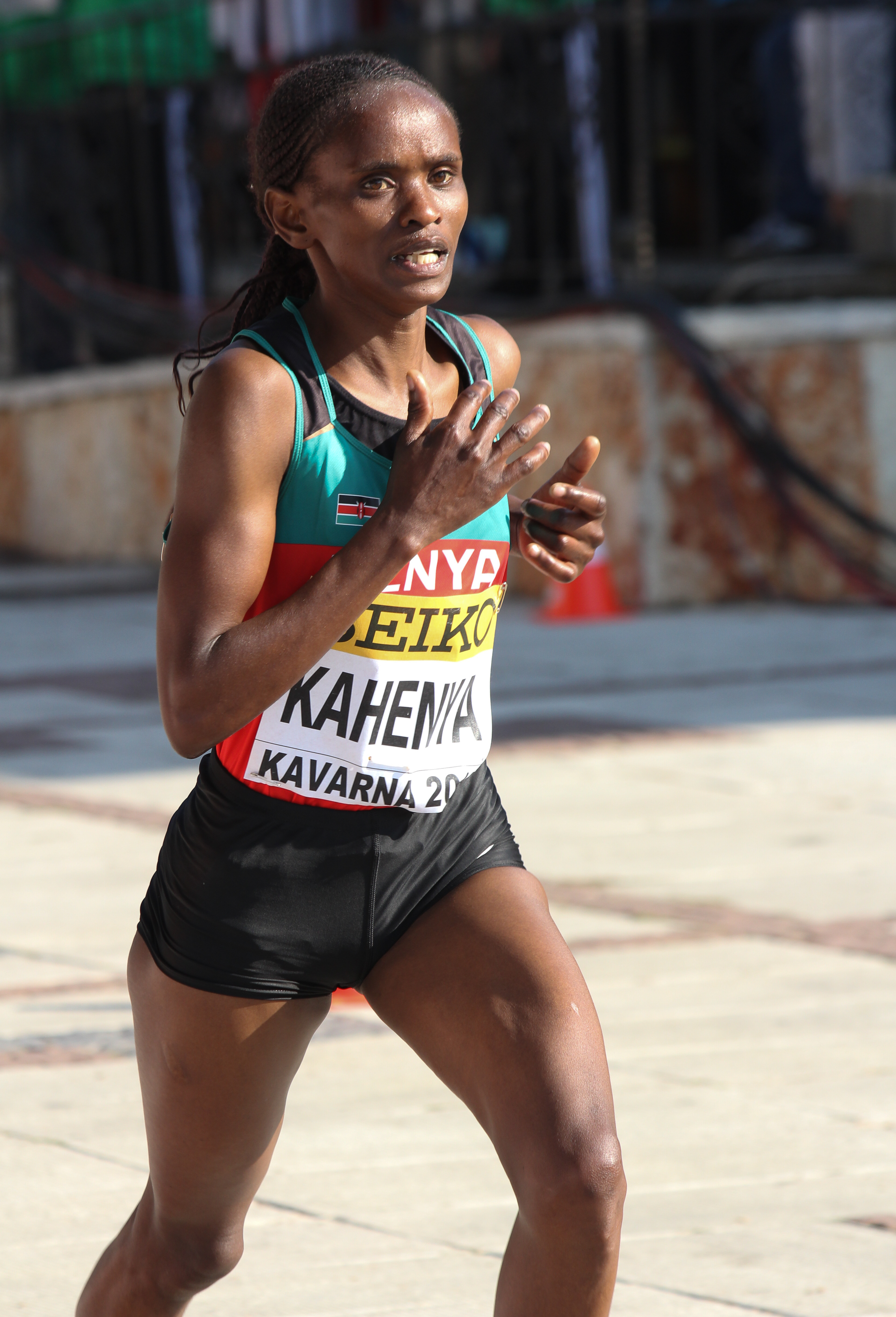
- Kaheny at the 2012 IAAF World Half Marathon Championships in Kavarna, Dobrich, Bulgaria

Personal information
- National team: Kenya
- Born: July 28, 1985 (age 40) Kiambu, Kenya

Pauline Njeri Kahenya (born 28 July 1985) is a Kenyan long-distance runner. She specialises in road races. She has won events including the Lidingöloppet; Albacete Half Marathon; Udine Half Marathon; Paris Half Marathon, where she also set a course record in 2012; Stramilano Half Marathon and Buriram Marathon. She has also placed highly at the Hamburg Alsterlauf; Lisbon Half Marathon and Lattelecom Riga Marathon.

== Career ==
In 2008, Kahenya finished second at the Hamburg Alsterlauf in Germany and seventh at the Delhi Half Marathon in India with a time of 1:10:23. She won the cross country race Lidingöloppet in Lidingö, Sweden with a time of 34:16.

In 2010, Kahenya won the sixth stage of the International Chiba Ekiden's Hanji Aoki Cup race at a time of 23:20.

In 2011, Kahenya finished fourth in the Lisbon Half Marathon with a time of 1:08:55; won the Albacete Half Marathon in Spain with a time of 1:11:11; and won the Udine Half Marathon in Italy with a time of 1:10:4. She also came fourth in the 10,000 metres at the All-Africa Games in Maputo, Mozambique and competed at the International Chiba Ekiden in Chiba, Japan. Kahenya won the women's 8km race at the Kenya Police Cross Country Championship at the Ngong Race Course in Nairobi, beating New York Marathon champion Edna Kiplagat with a tme of 29:01:02.

Kahenya was a member of the Kenyan women's half marathon team at the 2012 World Athletics Road Running Championships in Kavarna, Bulgaria, where the team won the silver medal with a time of 3:28:39. She came sixth in the individual women's half marathon event at the Championships with a time of 1:10:22, initially in the breakaway pack with Paskalia Chepkorir Kipkoech and Lydia Cheromei, but dropping back in the 42nd minute. Also in 2012, Kahenya won and set a course record at the Paris Half Marathon in France with a time of 1:07:55. She then won the Pune Half Marathon in India with a time of 1:08:37.

On 23 March 2013, Kahenya won the 42nd Stramilano Half-Marathon in Milan, Italy, after breaking away from Hellen Jepkurgat in the final kilometre. Later that year, she was given a one year ban until 21 April 2014, after an anti-doping violation for Prednisone and Prednisolone in accordance with World Athletics rules.

On 20 May 2018, Kahenya came third at the Lattelecom Riga Marathon in Riga, Latvia, finishing behind Georgina Jepkirui Rono and Tigist Teshome Ayanu, with a time of 2:34:41. In June 2018, she competed at the Safaricom Lewa Half Marathon at the Lewa Wildlife Conservancy in Kenya.

In February 2019, Kahenya won the Buriram Marathon in Thailand, with a time of 2:38:36. In December 2019, she placed ninth in the Macau Marathon in China with a time of 2:41:13. She also competed at the Falmouth Road Race in Massachusetts, United States, in 2019.

In 2020, Kahenya came third in the Sofia Marathon in Sofia, Bulgaria. She returned to the Sofia Marathon in October 2022, again placing third, with a time of 3:00:37.
