= Kirop =

Kirop is a surname of Kenyan origin. Notable people with the surname include:

- Helena Kirop (born 1976), Kenyan marathon runner
- Pius Maiyo Kirop (born 1990), Kenyan half marathon runner
- Sammy Kirop Kitwara (born 1986), Kenyan road runner

== See also ==
- Kiprop
