= Pius Maiyo Kirop =

Kenyan road runner (born 1990)

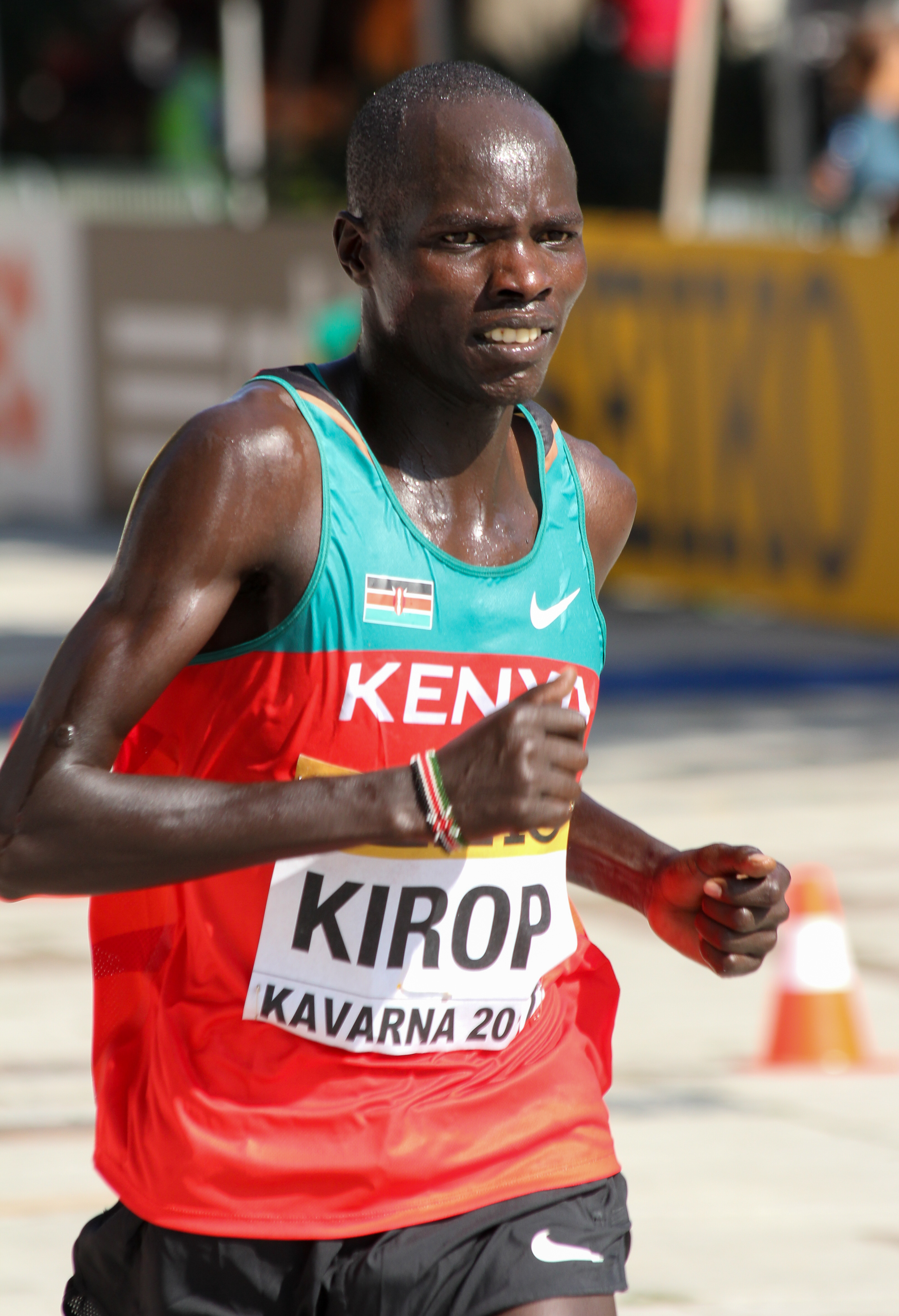
- Pius Maiyo Kirop at the 2012 World Half Marathon Championships in Kavarna, Bulgaria

Personal information
- Born: 8 January 1990 (age 36)

Sport
- Sport: Athletics
- Event(s): 10K run, half marathon, marathon

Achievements and titles
- Personal best(s): 10 km – 27:51 (2010); HM – 59:25 (2012); Marathon – 2:09:58 (2015)
Medal record
Representing Kenya
IAAF World Half Marathon Championships
Gold medal – first place	2012 Kavarna	Team

Pius Maiyo Kirop (born 8 January 1990) is a Kenyan road runner. He won a team gold medal at the IAAF World Half Marathon Championships in 2012.

Kirop began competing on the European professional circuit in 2009, taking a runner-up spot at the Bucharest Half Marathon. He returned the following year to win that race and set a personal best of 60:39 minutes in fourth at the Route du Vin Half Marathon. His marathon debut in Frankfurt ended in a failure to finish. Highlights of his 2011 season included fourth-place finishes at the Göteborgsvarvet and Route du Vin race, but another marathon outing in Köln Marathon saw him fail to finish again.

In 2012 he set a personal best of 59:25 minutes at the Berlin Half Marathon and won the Tilburg Ten Miles. He was selected for Kenya for the 2012 IAAF World Half Marathon Championships. Despite being one of the lesser runners on the circuit, he gave a strong performance there, taking fourth place in 61:11 minutes and helping John Nzau Mwangangi and Stephen Kosgei Kibet to the team gold medals.

Kirop failed to make a breakthrough after his 2012 season – he ran in higher calibre races, but struggled to get near the top of the fields. He began marathon running in 2015 and set a best of 2:09:58 hours for ninth at the Paris Marathon.

== International competitions ==
Year	Competition	Venue	Position	Event	Notes
2012	World Half Marathon Championships	Kavarna, Bulgaria	4th	Half marathon	1:01:11
2012	World Half Marathon Championships	Kavarna, Bulgaria	1st	Team	3:03:52

== Circuit wins ==
- Tilburg Ten Miles: 2012
- Bucharest Half Marathon: 2010
