= Paskalia Chepkorir Kipkoech =

Kenyan long-distance runner (born 1988)

Medal record

Women's athletics

Representing Kenya

IAAF World Half Marathon Championships
Bronze medal – third place	2012 Kavarna	Half marathon
Silver medal – second place	2012 Kavarna	Team

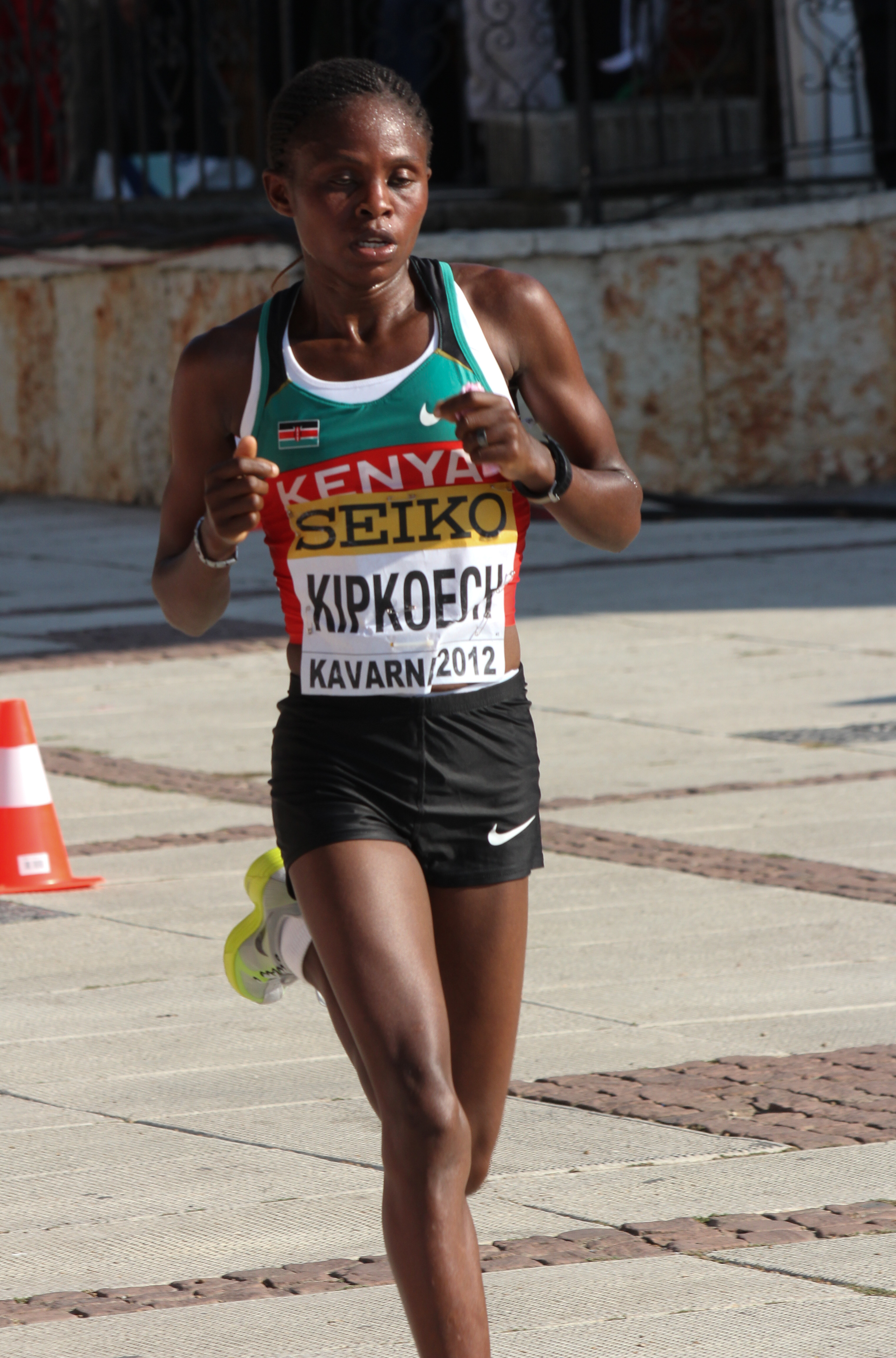
Paskalia Chepkorir Kipkoech of Kenya at the 2012 World Half Marathon Championships in Kavarna, Bulgaria

Paskalia Chepkorir Kipkoech (also known as Pasalia Jepkorir; born 22 December 1988) is a Kenyan long-distance runner who competes mainly in half marathon races. Her personal best of 67:17 minutes ranks her within the top twenty all-time for the distance. She was the bronze medallist at the 2012 IAAF World Half Marathon Championships.

She won a 3000 metres silver medal at the 2003 World Youth Championships in Athletics at the age of fourteen. She moved up to the half marathon distance in 2008 and has won races including the Berlin Half Marathon, Nairobi Half Marathon, Udine Half Marathon and the Corrida Internacional de São Silvestre. She also features in the top ten all-time for the 10K run, with a best of 30:57 minutes.

== Career ==
=== Early career ===
Raised in Molo, Kenya, she is from the Kipsigis tribe originating from the west of Kenya. She came to prominence in 2003 when, after a fifth place performance in the 5000 metres in a senior meeting in Eldoret, she was chosen to represent Kenya at the 2003 World Youth Championships in Athletics.

The fourteen-year-old went on to take the silver medal in the 3000 metres behind Morocco's Siham Hilali (two years her senior). Chepkorir was the youngest competitor at the tournament. She attempted to qualify for the 2005 World Youth Championships in Athletics, but finished eighth at the national youth championships.

=== First senior races ===
A small runner, only reaching 1.42 m (4 ft 8 in), Chepkorir started to compete at meetings abroad in 2007, running in Spain. She made her debut in the half marathon the following year, beginning with the Lisbon Half Marathon where she ran 71:15 minutes for eighth place. She was victorious at the Media Maraton de Ribarroja and also the half-section of the Nairobi Marathon that year. Her national performances also improved, as she was runner-up to Peninah Jepchumba in the 5000 m at the Kenyan Athletics Championships and was in the top two at multiple meets on the Athletics Kenya Cross Country Series.

A sixth place finish at the Kenyan Cross Country Championships put her in the frame for the national team at the 2009 IAAF World Cross Country Championships, but the selectors opted for Pauline Korikwiang instead, who was in good form that season but performed poorly at the event. Chepkorir ran extensively on the roads that year, with highlights including a 10K win in Brescia, a defence of her Ribarroja title, a personal best time of 69:56 minutes for third at the Prague Half Marathon, a win at the Udine Half Marathon, and a third place at the Porto Half Marathon. She was also the 5000 m runner-up at the Kenyan nationals that year. She closed the year with a win at the Corrida Internacional de São Silvestre 15K.

=== Elite half marathons ===
Chepkorir established herself among the top half marathon runners in the world with a win at the Berlin Half Marathon in March 2010, running a personal best of 69:43 minutes to beat Eunice Kales. She returned to the German city for the BIG 25 Berlin race, and placed third. She was selected to compete for Kenya at the 2010 IAAF World Half Marathon Championships but injury curtailed her season before she could make her international senior debut there.

She missed the 2011 season but re-emerged in 2012 to set some personal bests in Brazil, running 30:57 minutes for the 10K and 67:17 minutes at the Rio de Janeiro Half Marathon. Both marks moved her up into the top twenty all-time runners for each event and ranked her in the top five globally that season. She entered the 2012 IAAF World Half Marathon Championships as one of Kenyan's quickest runners and she ran at the front of the race, eventually reducing the leaders down to herself Meseret Hailu and Feyse Tadese. She fell back in the latter stages of the race and finished with the bronze medal, ten seconds behind the winner. She also led the Kenyan team to the silver medals in the team competition. This competition marked her only defeat of the year when her final race at the Nairobi Half Marathon resulted in her sixth win of the year.

Her winning streak was abruptly ended in 2013 – a year in which she won no major races. Her best race came in February at the RAK Half Marathon, although her time of 68:08 minutes was only enough for eighth in the top quality contest. The remaining highlights of that year for Chepkorir were third placings at the Carlsbad 5000 and the Lisbon Half Marathon, as well as a close runner-up finish to Sylvia Kibet at the Carrera de la Mujer. She missed the 2014 season.

== Personal bests ==
- 3000 metres – 9:13.77 min (2003)
- 5000 metres – 15:56.48 min (2008)
- 10,000 metres – 32:59.2 min (2013)
- 5K run – 15:28 min (2013)
- 10K run – 30:57 min (2012)
- 15K run – 52:30 min (2009)
- 25K run – 1:26:47 min (2010)
- Half marathon – 67:17 min (2012)

== International competitions ==
Year	Competition	Venue	Position	Event	Notes
2003	World Youth Championships	Sherbrooke, Canada	2nd	3000 metres	
2012	World Half Marathon Championships	Kavarna, Bulgaria	3rd	Half marathon	
2012	World Half Marathon Championships	Kavarna, Bulgaria	2nd	Team	
