= Clinton Perrett =

Australian long-distance runner

Personal information
- Born: 11 May 1983 (age 42)

Sport
- Country: Australia
- Event: Long-distance running

Clinton Perrett (born 11 May 1983) is an Australian long-distance runner.

In 2010, he competed in the men's half marathon at the 2010 IAAF World Half Marathon Championships held in Nanning, China. He finished in 44th place.

In 2012, he competed in the men's half marathon at the 2012 IAAF World Half Marathon Championships held in Kavarna, Bulgaria. He finished in 51st place.

As of January 2023, Clinton teaches P.E. (Physical Education) at Wesley College (Victoria)'s Elsternwick Campus.
