= Ftaw Zeray =

Ethiopian long-distance runner (born 1997)

Personal information
- Nationality: Ethiopian
- Born: August 3, 1997 (age 29)

Sport
- Sport: Athletics
- Events: Long-distance running (Marathon, Half Marathon, 10K Road)
Medal record
Women's athletics
Representing Ethiopia
World Road Running Championships
Bronze medal – third place	2026 Copenhagen	Half marathon team

Ftaw Zeray (born 3 August 1997) is an Ethiopian long-distance runner specializing in road racing events, particularly the half marathon and 10K road race, and also competes in the marathon. She has earned multiple podium finishes in international competitions and set a course record.

== Career ==
In 2019, Zeray ran a personal best of 2:29:15 in the marathon. In February 2023, she finished third at the Ras Al Khaimah (RAK) Half Marathon in the UAE, setting a personal best of 1:06:04. Later that year, she placed sixth at the World Athletics Half Marathon Championships in Riga, Latvia. In June 2023, Zeray recorded a personal best of 31:55 in a 10K road race.

In April 2025, she placed second at the Generali Berlin Half Marathon, finishing in 1:07:01 (some sources report 1:07:02).

Later that month, Zeray won the Shanghai Half Marathon, setting a new event record with a time of 1:06:36, breaking the previous course mark significantly.

== Personal bests ==
As of May 2025, Ftaw Zeray's personal bests are:

- 10K Road – 31:55 (2023)
- Half Marathon – 1:06:04 (Ras Al Khaimah, 2023)
- Marathon – 2:29:15 (2019)
