= Samwel Mailu =

Kenyan long-distance runner

Personal information
- Nationality: Kenya
- Born: Samwel Nyamai Mailu; 7 February 1993 (age 33)

Sport
- Sport: Athletics

Achievements and titles
- Personal best(s): 1500m: 3:54.86 (Nairobi, 2022); 5000m: 14:24.50 (Nairobi, 2022); 10,000m: 29:58.33 (Nairobi, 2022); Half marathon: 59:19 (Riga, 2023); Marathon: 2:05:08 (Vienna, 2023)
Medal record
Men's athletics
Representing Kenya
World Road Running Championships
Bronze medal – third place	2023 Riga	Half marathon

Samwel Nyamai Mailu (born 7 February 1993) is a Kenyan long-distance runner. He won a bronze medal in the half marathon at the 2023 World Athletics Road Running Championships in Riga.

== Early life ==
Mailu grew up the son of vegetable farmers, one of five children, in a village called Ulawani, not far from the Kenya-Tanzania border and Mount Kilimanjaro, although he himself did not live at high altitude. He only started to train at fifteen years-old and stopped running until later in life after completing a college course to become a primary school teacher. He started training seriously in 2020, and moved to a training camp in Machakos, southeast of Nairobi.

== Career ==
In June 2022, Mailu won the Hamburg half-marathon with a time of 1:01:52 despite bad weather conditions. Later that year Mailu finished as runner-up at the Frankfurt Marathon running 2:07.19 despite initially only starting the race in the role of pacemaker. He had never completed a competitive marathon before.

Mailu set a new course record and personal best time of 2:05.08 to win the Vienna Marathon in April 2023. In June 2023, Mailu successfully defended his Hamburg half-marathon title.

Mailu was part of a Kenyan clean-sweep of the medals, alongside Sabastian Sawe and Daniel Simiu Ebenyo in the half-marathon during the World Road Running Championships in Riga, Latvia on 1 October 2023. It meant Kenya also comfortably claimed the team title at the event.
