= Benjamin Malaty =

French long-distance runner

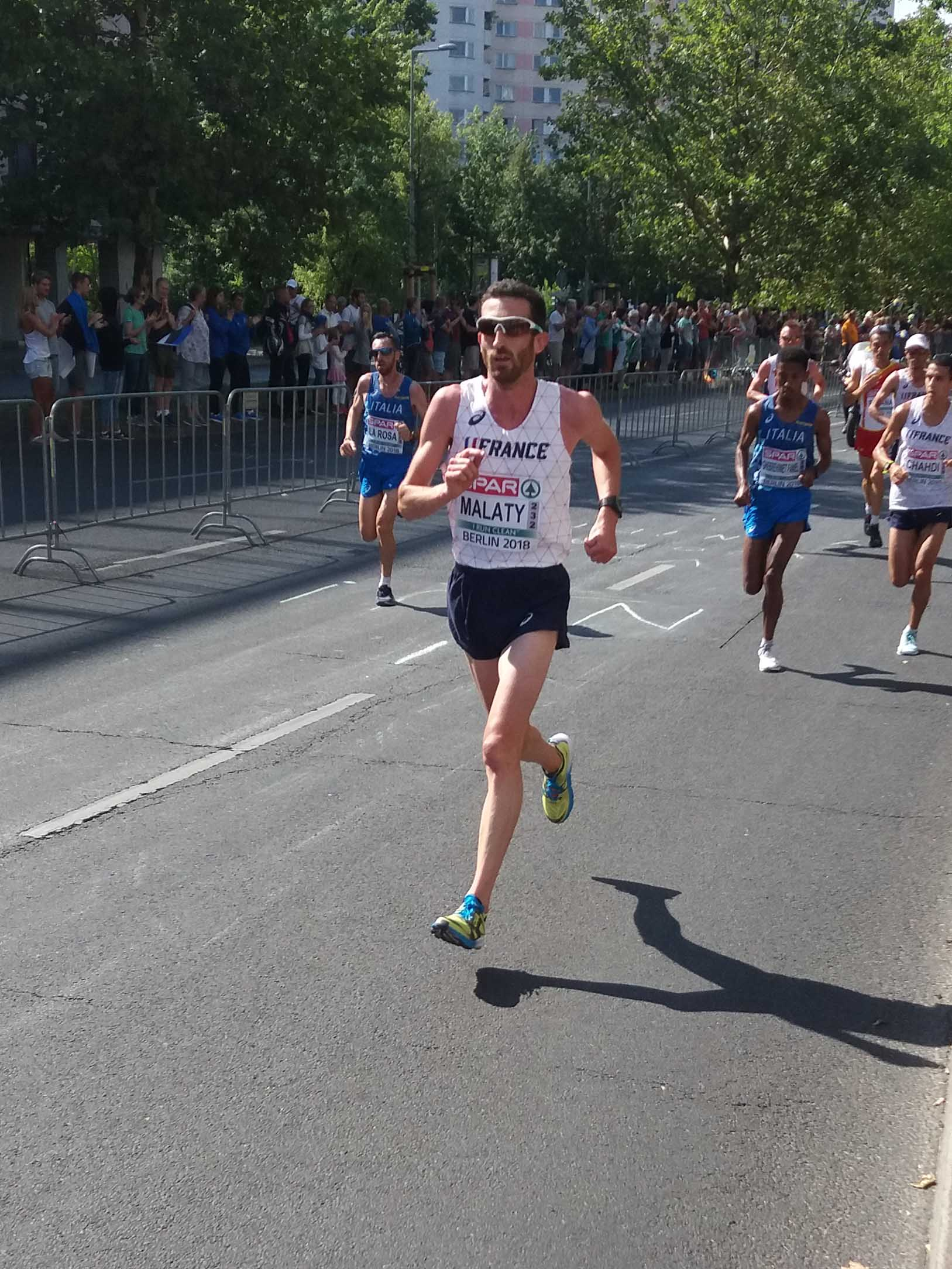
- Benjamin Malaty in 2018

Personal information
- Born: 7 May 1986 (age 39)

Sport
- Country: France
- Sport: Long-distance running

Benjamin Malaty (born 7 May 1986) is a French long-distance runner. In 2018, he competed in the men's half marathon at the 2018 IAAF World Half Marathon Championships held in Valencia, Spain. He finished in 66th place. He also competed in the men's half marathon at the 2018 Mediterranean Games held in Tarragona, Spain. He finished in 9th place.

He competed in the junior men's race at the 2005 IAAF World Cross Country Championships held in Saint-Galmier, Rhône-Alpes, France and he finished in 123rd place.

In 2012, he competed in the men's half marathon at the 2012 IAAF World Half Marathon Championships held in Kavarna, Bulgaria. He finished in 31st place.
