= Udine Half Marathon =

Road running event in Udine, Italy

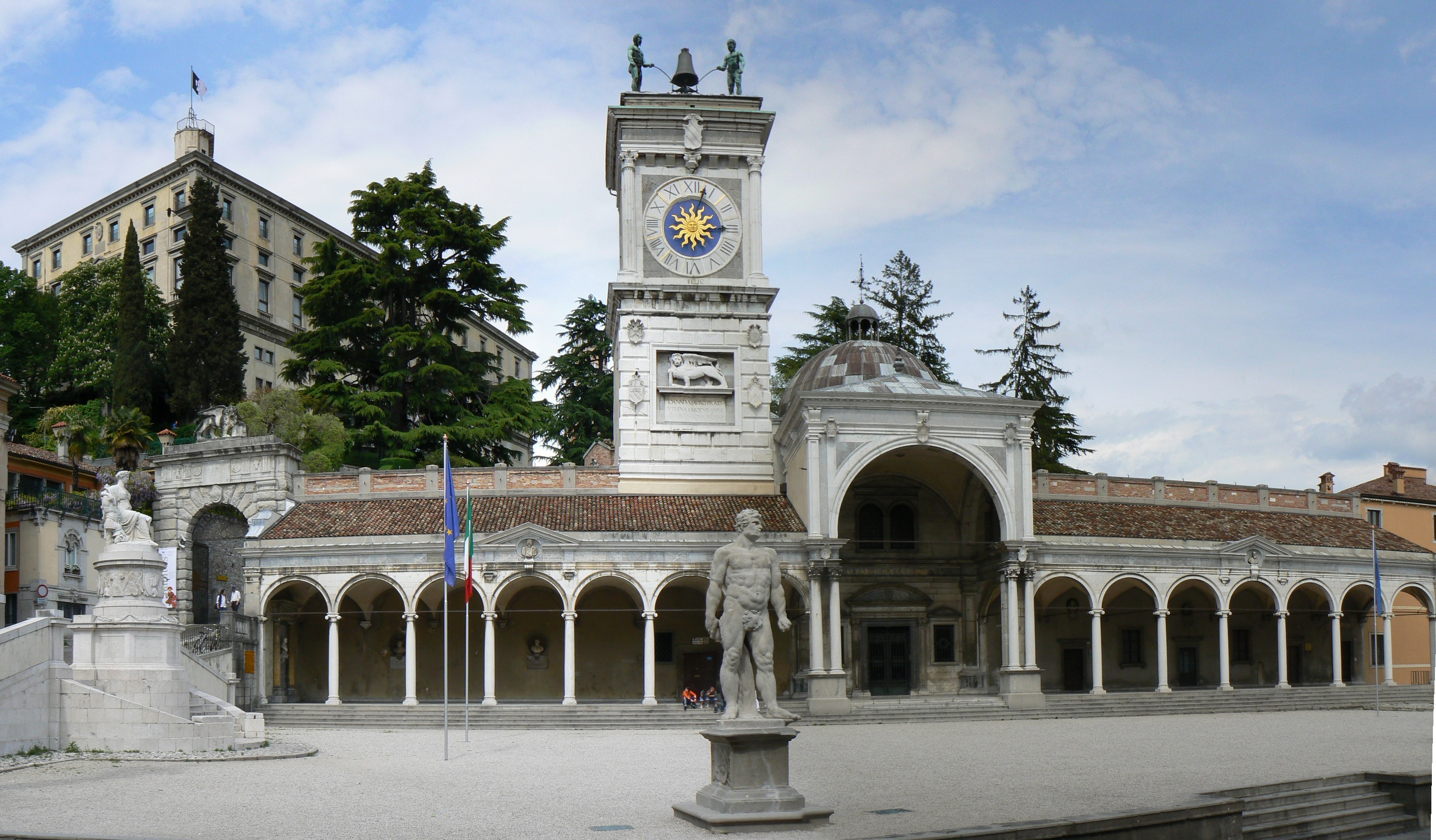
- Piazza Liberta is the race start and finish point
- Date: Late September
- Location: Udine, Italy
- Event type: Road
- Distance: Half marathon
- Primary sponsor: CiviBank
- Established: 2000
- Course records: Men's: 59:06 (2013) (Kenya) Geoffrey Mutai; Women's: 1:07:23 (2003) (Kenya) Margaret Okayo
- Website: Udine Half Marathon
- Participants: 1,071 (2019)

The Udine Half Marathon (Italian: Maratonina Udine) is an annual road running event over the half marathon distance (21.1 km/13.1 mi) which takes place in late September in Udine, Italy.

The competition is organised by the Associazione Maratonina Udinese and was first held in 2000. It combines a mass race with elite level international participants. Around 1500 runners competed at the 2012 event and this grew to 2162 people the following year. In addition to the main half marathon, there a number of other events held during the race weekend including separate divisions for handbikes and jogging strollers, a non-competitive 7-kilometre (4.3-mile) run called the STRAUdine, and Nordic walking.

The course for the race was used for the 2007 IAAF World Road Running Championships. This tournament produced the fastest men's and women's times for the half marathon ever run on Italian soil (58:59 minutes by Zersenay Tadese and 1:06:25 by Lornah Kiplagat).

The course record holders are Geoffrey Mutai in the men's section (59:06 minutes) and Margaret Okayo in the women's section (1:07:23 hours). Kenyan runners have dominated the elite race since its inauguration. All the men's winners have been from Kenya and Kenyan women have topped the podium on all but four occasions. Margaret Okayo won the competition three times in its first four years and Hungary's Anikó Kálovics has since matched that feat.

== Past winners ==
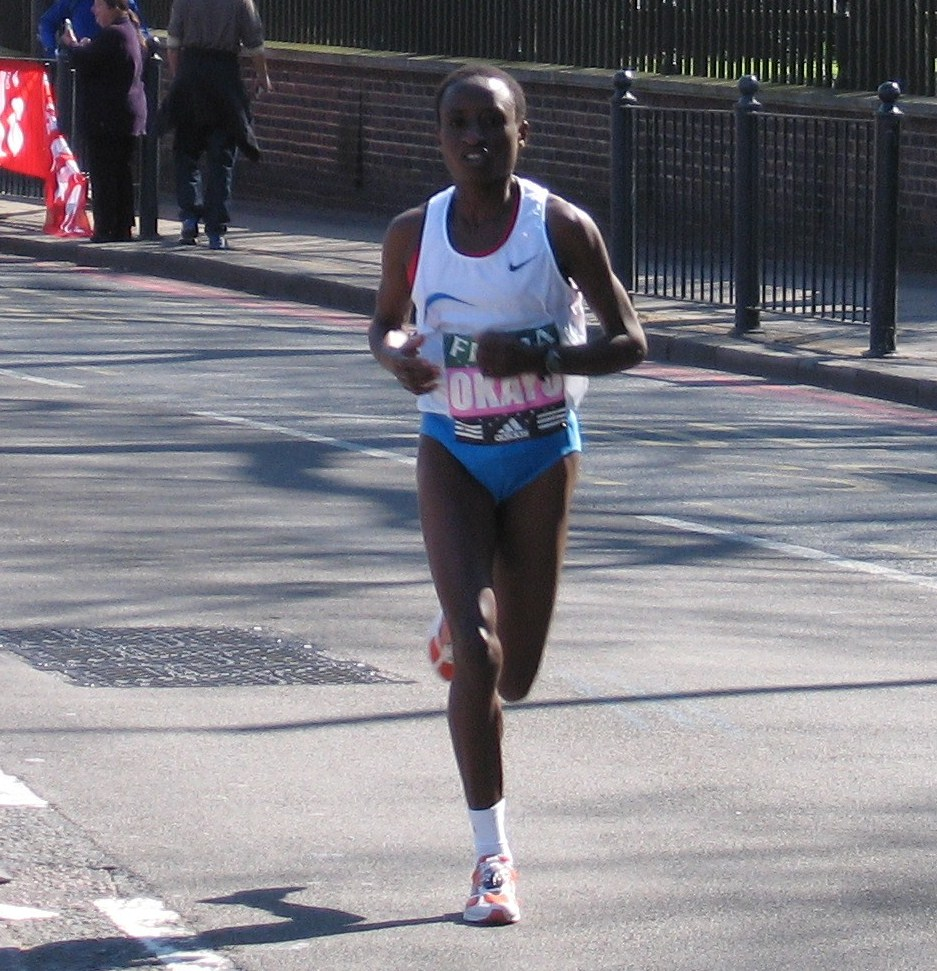
Kenya's Margaret Okayo is the women's course record holder.

Key: Course record

Edition	Year	Men's winner	Time (h:m:s)	Women's winner	Time (h:m:s)
1st	2000	Japhet Kosgei (KEN)	1:00:22	Margaret Okayo (KEN)	1:09:03
2nd	2001	Japhet Kosgei (KEN)	1:01:23	Margaret Okayo (KEN)	1:08:51
3rd	2002	Patrick Ivuti (KEN)	59:45	Anne Jelagat (KEN)	1:08:58
4th	2003	James Kwambai (KEN)	1:00:38	Margaret Okayo (KEN)	1:07:23
5th	2004	James Kwambai (KEN)	1:00:22	Hellen Cherono (KEN)	1:10:07
6th	2005	Robert Kipchumba (KEN)	1:01:13	Pamela Chepchumba (KEN)	1:09:09
7th	2006	Evans Cheruiyot (KEN)	1:00:18	Anikó Kálovics (HUN)	1:10:33
8th	2007	Solomon Rotich (KEN)	1:02:48	Nadia Ejjafini (ITA)	1:11:32
9th	2008	Benson Barus (KEN)	59:41	Anikó Kálovics (HUN)	1:10:08
10th	2009	Benson Barus (KEN)	1:01:28	Pasalia Kipkoech (KEN)	1:11:11
11th	2010	William Chebor (KEN)	1:00:49	Anikó Kálovics (HUN)	1:11:34
12th	2011	Stephen Kibet (KEN)	1:00:20	Pauline Njeri (KEN)	1:10:42
13th	2012	Robert Chemosin (KEN)	1:00:23	Georgina Rono (KEN)	1:07:58
14th	2013	Geoffrey Mutai (KEN)	59:06	Goretti Chepkoech (KEN)	1:10:06
15th	2014	Ruggero Pertile (ITA)	1:04:48	Laila Soufyane (ITA)	1:13:20
16th	2015	Solomon Yego (KEN)	1:00:04	Violah Jepchumba (KEN)	1:09:29
17th	2016	Joash Koech (KEN)	1:02:04	Pauline Eyapan (KEN)	1:12:52
18th	2017	Noah Kigen (KEN)	1:01:12	Winfridah Moseti (KEN)	1:11:55
19th	2018	Moses Kemei (KEN)	1:01:14	Sara Dossena (ITA)	1:10:10
20th	2019	Noël Hitimana (RWA)	1:00:37	Winfridah Moseti (KEN)	1:09:07
