= Luke Puskedra =

American long-distance runner

Personal information
- Nationality: American
- Born: February 8, 1990 (age 36) Ogden, Utah, U.S.
- Height: 6 ft 4 in (1.93 m)
- Weight: 167 lb (76 kg)

Sport
- Country: United States
- Events: marathon, half marathon, 10,000 meters, 5000 meters
- College team: Oregon Ducks
- Club: Oregon Track Club

Achievements and titles
- Personal bests: 5000 m: 13:31.88 (Los Angeles 2013); 10,000 m: 27:56.62 (Eugene 2012); Half marathon: 61:29 (Houston 2016); Marathon: 2:10:24 (Chicago 2015)

Luke Puskedra (born February 8, 1990) is an American long-distance runner who competes over distances ranging from 10,000 meters to the marathon.

He grew up in Ogden, Utah and attended Judge Memorial Catholic High School before studying business administration at the University of Oregon. He competed for the Oregon Ducks track and field and cross country teams, earned 12 NCAA Division I All-American awards and was a 10,000 meter finalist at the NCAA level four years running from 2009 to 2012.

In 2015, Puskedra won the Vancouver Sun Run.

== Running career ==
=== High school ===
Puskedra graduated from Judge Memorial Catholic High School in Salt Lake City, Utah in 2008. He was an eight-time state champion in high school winning Utah state track championships in the 1600 meters and 3200 meters as a sophomore, junior and senior and winning the state cross country championships as a junior and senior. He set all-classifications records his senior year in track at 3200 meters (8:54.40) and 1,600 meters (4:09.40) and cross country (14:54.60). He was also the first Utah high school runner to break 9:00 in the 3200 meters. He was the 2007 Nike Cross Southwest Regional champion winning the race in 14:48 breaking the meet record. He went on to place fifth at the 2007 Foot Locker National Cross Country Championships. He ran the fastest high school indoor mile time in the country (4:08.77) in 2008 at the Reebok Boston Indoor Games. On March 16, 2008, at the Nike Indoor Nationals Puskedra ran the sixth fastest high school indoor two mile time in U.S. history winning the race in a time of 8:49.58. In 2008 as a senior he placed second in both the mile (4:06.60) and two mile (8:47.06) at the Nike Outdoor National meet. He placed tenth in the two mile at the 2008 Prefontaine Classic in a time of 8:46.41. As a junior he finished fourth in the Penn Relays high school boys mile in 4:25.11. Puskedra was a three-time Utah Boys Gatorade Athlete of the Year recipient (2006–07 and 2007–08 in track and 2007 in cross country). He was the 2007-08 Salt Lake Tribune Athlete of Year (all sports) and a USA Today All-American at one and two miles.

High school bests:

- 800 m - 1:58.37
- Mile - 4:06.60
- 1600 m - 4:09.29
- Two mile - 8:46.41
- 3200 m - 8:54.40

=== Collegiate ===
Puskedra was recruited to University of Oregon where coach Andy Powell had him specialize in various long distances spanning from the 3 km to 10 km. He placed fourth overall in the men's 10,000 meter final at the 2012 NCAA DI Outdoor T&F Championships.

=== Post-collegiate ===
After graduating from Oregon, Puskedra signed a professional contract with Nike and joined the Nike Oregon Project. There he was coached by Alberto Salazar, and the training regimen was very similar to the college program as Salazar was largely influential in Powell's training philosophy at the University of Oregon.

However, at the end of 2014, his contract with Nike expired, and Puskedra did not anticipate continuing a professional career in running. He moved with his wife to South Africa and gained 23 pounds from his race weight in the course of a month. In spite of the time elapsed from his graduation, college coach Andy Powell remained in contact with Puskedra and gradually convinced him to return to running.

Puskedra and his wife returned to the United States, where he trained briefly for a marathon debut at the 2014 New York City Marathon. In his marathon debut, he ran 2:28:54, but given his half marathon personal record it was widely seen as a disappointing result. Although discouraged by his experience in New York City, he proceeded to train for the 2015 Grandma's Marathon, where he ran a significantly faster result of 2:15:27.

After 2016 US Olympic Marathon Trials, Puskedra switched from Nike to ASICS following Team Hall's apparels unification. But he later reverted to Nike, due to connect with Evan Jager and Sam Crouser.

In January 2018, Puskedra joined the Oregon Track Club.

Shortly after the 2019 Aramco Houston Half marathon, Puskedra's Oregon Track Club contract becomes expired. Soon, he retired from competitive running and turned to real estate. For the 2019 season, Puskedra won't run at the 2019 Faxon Law New Haven Road Race 20k. Instead, Jim Walmsley will run the 2019 Faxon Law New Haven Road Race 20k.

== Competition record ==
=== Marathon ===
Year	Competition	Venue	Position	Notes
Representing the United States
2014	New York Marathon	New York, New York	36th	2:28:54
2015	Grandma's Marathon	Duluth, Minnesota	6th	2:15:27
2015	Chicago Marathon	Chicago, Illinois	5th	2:10:24
2016	US Olympic Trials Marathon	Los Angeles, California	4th	2:14:12
2016	Chicago Marathon	Chicago, Illinois	19th	2:20:18
2017	Boston Marathon	Boston, Massachusetts	9th	2:14:45
2017	Chicago Marathon	Chicago, Illinois	20th	2:17:53

=== Half marathon ===
Year	Competition	Venue	Position	Notes
Representing the United States
2012	Houston Half Marathon	Houston, Texas	4th	1:01:36
2012	World Half Marathon Championships	Kavarna, Bulgaria	17th	1:02:46
2015	Rock 'n' Roll Half Marathon	Portland, Oregon	1st	1:05:10
2016	Houston Half Marathon	Houston, Texas	4th	1:01:29
2018	Houston Half Marathon	Houston, Texas	34th	1:03:40

=== USA National Championships ===
==== Road ====
Year	Competition	Venue	Position	Event	Notes
2012	USA 20 km Championships	New Haven, Connecticut	2nd	20 km	58:48
2014	USA Half Marathon Championships	Houston, Texas	6th	half marathon	1:01:48
2014	USA 20 km Championships	New Haven, Connecticut	3rd	20 km	1:01:32
2015	USA 15 km Championships	Jacksonville, Florida	18th	15 km	46:25
2015	USA 20 km Championships	New Haven, Connecticut	4th	20 km	59:30
2016	US Olympic Trials	Los Angeles, California	4th	marathon	2:14:12
2018	USA 20 km Championships	New Haven, Connecticut	14th	20 km	1:03:31

==== Track and field ====
Year	Competition	Venue	Position	Event	Notes
2012	U.S. Olympic Trials	Eugene, Oregon	8th	10,000 m	27:56.62
2013	USA Outdoor Track and Field Championships	Des Moines, Iowa	9th	10,000 m	29:27.28

=== NCAA championships ===
==== Outdoor track and field ====
Year	Competition	Venue	Position	Event	Notes
Representing Oregon
2009	NCAA Outdoor Track and Field Championships	Fayetteville, Arkansas	11th	10,000 m	29:20.18
2010	NCAA Outdoor Track and Field Championships	Eugene, Oregon	14th	10,000 m	29:27.13
2011	NCAA Outdoor Track and Field Championships	Des Moines, Iowa	6th	10,000 m	28:33.47
2012	NCAA Outdoor Track and Field Championships	Des Moines, Iowa	4th	10,000 m	28:24.24

==== Indoor track and field ====
Year	Competition	Venue	Position	Event	Notes
Representing Oregon
2009	NCAA Indoor Track and Field Championships	College Station, Texas	6th	5000 m	13:50.82
2010	NCAA Indoor Track and Field Championships	Fayetteville, Arkansas	9th	5000 m	13.57.98
2010	NCAA Indoor Track and Field Championships	Fayetteville, Arkansas	14th	3000 m	8:22.47
2011	NCAA Indoor Track and Field Championships	College Station, Texas	14th	5000 m	14:02.26

==== Cross country ====
Year	Competition	Venue	Position	Notes
Representing Oregon
2008	NCAA Cross Country Championships	Terre Haute, Indiana	5th	29.27.8
2009	NCAA Cross Country Championships	Terre Haute, Indiana	21st	30:01.9
2010	NCAA Cross Country Championships	Terre Haute, Indiana	3rd	29.38.0
2011	NCAA Cross Country Championships	Terre Haute, Indiana	6th	29:09.3

== Personal bests ==
Surface	Event	Time	Date	Location
Outdoor track	1500 m	3:53.79	March 21, 2009	Eugene, Oregon
Outdoor track	Mile	4:06.60	June 18, 2008	Greensboro, North Carolina
Outdoor track	3000 m	7:59.33	May 3, 2013	Eugene, Oregon
Outdoor track	2 miles	8:46.41	June 8, 2008	Eugene, Oregon
Outdoor track	5000 m	13:31.88	May 17, 2013	Los Angeles, California
Outdoor track	10,000 m	27:56:62	June 22, 2012	Eugene, Oregon
Indoor track	Mile	4:08.77	January 26, 2008	Boston, Massachusetts
Indoor track	3000 m	8:00.69	January 30, 2010	College Station, Texas
Indoor track	2 mile	8:07.41	January 25, 2014	Landover, Maryland
Indoor track	5000 m	13:50.82	March 13, 2009	College Station, Texas
Road	10 km	28:53	April 19, 2015	Vancouver, British Columbia
Road	12 km	35:47	May 3, 2015	Spokane, Washington
Road	15 km	46:25	March 15, 2015	Jacksonville, Florida
Road	20 km	58:48	September 3, 2012	New Haven, Connecticut
Road	Half marathon	1:01:29	January 17, 2016	Houston, Texas
Road	Marathon	2:10:24	October 11, 2015	Chicago, Illinois
