= Stephen Kosgei Kibet =

Kenyan long-distance runner

Medal record

Men's athletics

Representing Kenya

IAAF World Half Marathon Championships
Gold medal – first place	2012 Kavarna	Team race

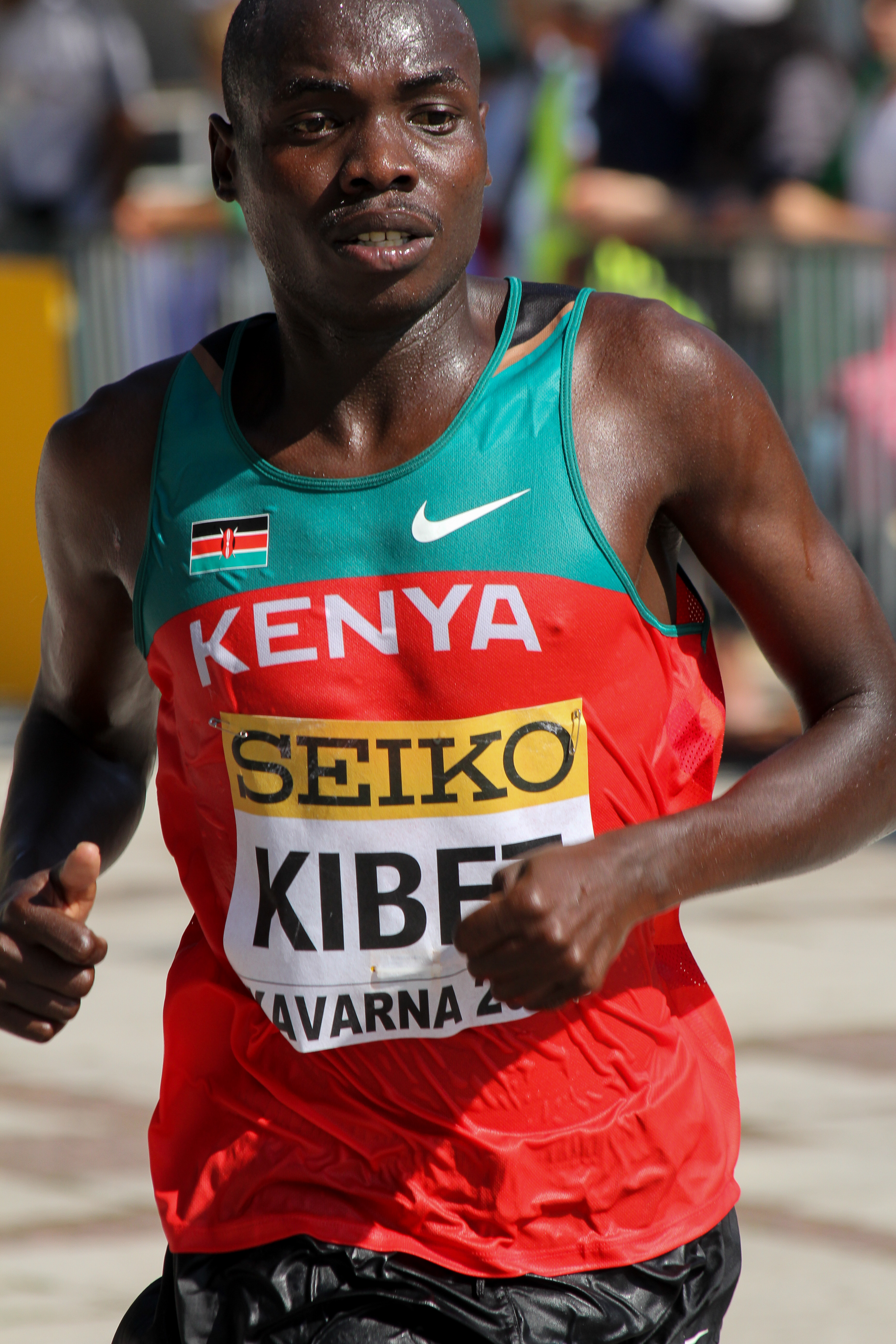
Stephen Kosgei Kibet at the 2012 World Half Marathon Championships in Kavarna, Bulgaria

Stephen Kosgei Kibet (born 9 November 1986) is a Kenyan long-distance runner who competes in road running competitions from the 10K run to the marathon. His half marathon personal best of 58:54 minutes ranks him in the top ten of all-time for the distance. His best of the marathon distance is 2:08:05 hours.

He has won half marathon races in Paris, Udine, and the Hague. He represented Kenya at the 2012 IAAF World Half Marathon Championships, coming fifth and taking the team gold medal.

== Career ==
His first European road races came in 2009: at the Roma-Ostia Half Marathon he surprised with a third-place finish in a time of 61:19 minutes. He improved to 60:34 minutes to come third at the Nice Half Marathon, but failed to finish his debut marathon at the Prague Marathon in May. His first victory came at the 2010 Azkoitia-Azpeitia Half Marathon, where his time of 60:48 minutes was the second fastest recorded at the event at that point. He set a series of personal bests over various distances later that year, first running 27:52 minutes at the Beach to Beacon 10K, then 32:50 minutes at the Falmouth Road Race, culminating in a victory in 60:09 minutes at the Porto Half Marathon.

Kibet went undefeated in the half marathon in 2011, taking victories in Paris and Udine. He also won at the shorter Amatrice-Configno race. He finished his first race over the marathon distance that year. At the Dubai Marathon he started as pacemaker but came fifth in a time of 2:09:27 hours. He performed less well at the Paris Marathon (coming twelfth) and did not finish at the 2011 New York City Marathon.

He made his breakthrough into the top of his field at the 2012 CPC Loop Den Haag, running a big personal best of 58:54 minutes to win the race ahead of pre-race favourite Jonathan Maiyo. This result placed Kibet as the second fastest half marathoner in the world that year (behind Atsedu Tsegay) and moved him up to seventh on the all-time lists. At the Rotterdam Marathon he gave his best performance yet over the distance with a run of 2:08:05 hours for fourth place. In August he had top three finishes at the Beach to Beacon and Falmouth races. Kibet was a prominent entrant at the 2012 IAAF World Half Marathon Championships, his first international selection, but ended in sixth place over a minute behind winner Zersenay Tadese. However, this performance helping Kenya to the team gold medals. Despite his rise as an individual athlete, he acted as pacemaker at the Seoul International Marathon in November.

The 2013 was less successful for Kibet. His best run came at the Ras Al Khaimah Half Marathon, running 59:59 minutes for fifth and twelfth on that year's rankings. He was third at the Rock 'n' Roll San Diego Half Marathon, but only twelfth at the Delhi Half Marathon. His sole outing in the marathon that year came in Milan and his was some way off his best with a time of 2:12:31 hours for fourth place.

== Personal bests ==
- 10K run – 27:52 min (2010)
- Half marathon – 58:54 min (2012)
- Marathon – 2:08:05 hrs (2012)

== International competition record ==
Year	Competition	Venue	Position	Event	Notes
2012	World Half Marathon Championships	Kavarna, Bulgaria	5th	Individual	
2012	World Half Marathon Championships	Kavarna, Bulgaria	1st	Team	
