= Daniel Vargas (runner) =

Mexican long-distance runner

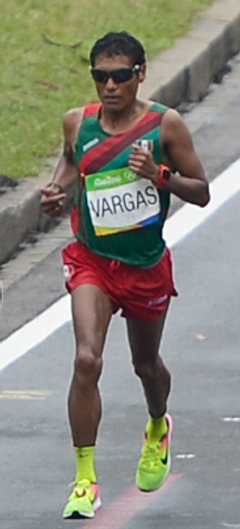
- Vargas at the 2016 Olympics

Personal information
- Born: March 6, 1984 (age 42) León, Guanajuato, Mexico
- Height: 1.62 m (5 ft 4 in)
- Weight: 53 kg (117 lb)

Sport
- Country: Mexico
- Sport: Athletics
- Event(s): Marathon, half marathon
- Coached by: Federico Villanueva

Achievements and titles
- Personal best(s): Marathon – 2:13:06 (2012); HM – 1:04:18 (2012)

Daniel de Jesús Vargas Sánchez (born March 6, 1984) is a Mexican long-distance runner. He competed in the marathon at the 2012 and 2016 Olympics and finished 39th and 54th, respectively.

Vargas is married to Hortensia and has one daughter. His brother Gualberto Vargas Sanchez is also a long-distance runner. His father died four days before the 2016 Houston Marathon, where he was supposed to qualify for the 2016 Olympics. Depressed, he failed to meet the qualification time, but was selected for the Olympic after a special meeting of the selection committee.
