= Georgina Rono =

Kenyan long-distance runner (born 1980)

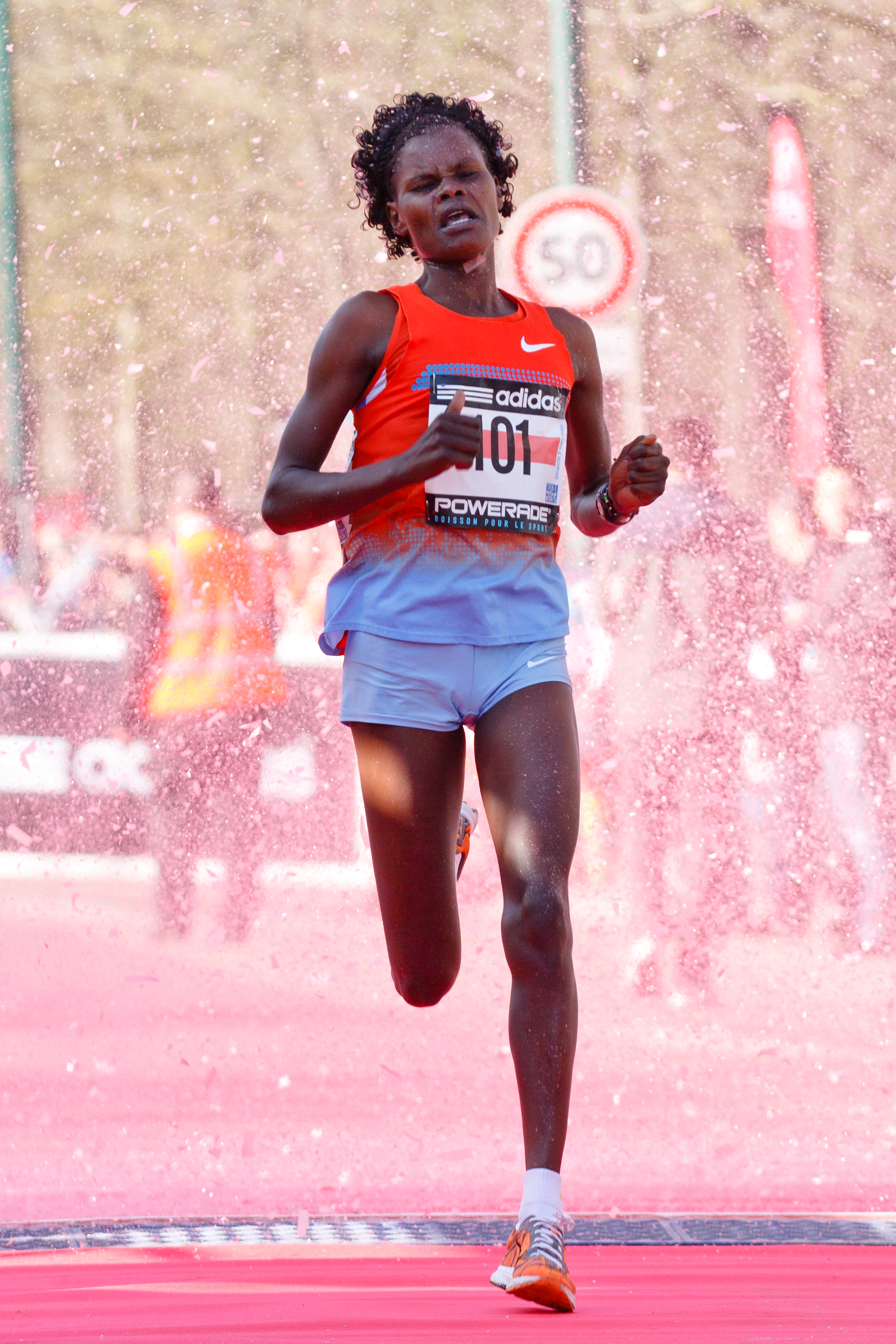
Gorgina Rono, 2nd of Paris Half Marathon 2014

Georgina J. Rono (born 19 May 1980 in Kapsabet, Rift Valley Province) is a Kenyan long-distance runner who specialises in marathon running. She was third at the 2012 Boston Marathon. Rono won the Hamburg Marathon in 2014.

In January 2023, it was announced that Rono had been banned for four years by Anti-Doping Agency of Kenya for evading a doping test.

== Career ==
Rono is married to another Kenyan distance runner, Daniel Koech, and they have two children. She began competing in international races in 2006. Originally based in Spain, she came third at the Valencia Half Marathon and set a personal best of 1:03:41 hours for fourth at the Seville Half Marathon that year. In 2007 her best run was a third-place finish at the Semi-Marathon d'Oloron. Rono stepped up to the marathon distance in 2008 and was fourth on her debut at the Prague Marathon, running a time of 2:40:23 hours, and fifth at the Ljubljana Marathon.

She went under two hours and forty minutes for the first time at the Alexander the Great Marathon, where her time of 2:37:39 hours was enough for second place. She bettered this time by almost six minutes with her sixth-place performance at the 2009 Frankfurt Marathon. She was runner-up at the 2010 Marrakesh Marathon and again beat her best to finish in 2:30:55 hours for third at the Maratona d'Italia in Carpi.

The 2011 season marked a breakthrough for Rono: she began with a half marathon best of 1:09:08 at the Rabat Half Marathon, then won her first marathon race at the Hannover Marathon. She established herself among the world's best runners over the distance at the Eindhoven Marathon that October. She ran alone in the final 10 km to cross the line in a course record time of 2:24:33 (a personal improvement of more than six minutes). This placed her within the top ten Kenyan runners that year. She returned to Kenya at the end of the year and competed in cross country races, including third places at the Tuskys Wareng Cross Country and Discovery Kenya Cross Country.

She was a distant second to Mary Keitany at the RAK Half Marathon at the start of 2012, but was five seconds off a personal best. In her first World Major Marathon appearance, she reached the podium at the 2012 Boston Marathon. Warm temperatures disrupted the event, but she managed to make it a Kenyan sweep in the women's race with her third-place finish. She improved her personal best to 67:58 minutes to win the Udine Half Marathon and took three minutes off her best at the Frankfurt Marathon, where she was second in a time of 2:21:39 hours.

== Personal bests ==
- Half marathon – 1:07:58 (Udine 2012)
- Marathon – 2:21:39 (Frankfurt 2012)
