= John Nzau Mwangangi =

Kenyan long-distance runner

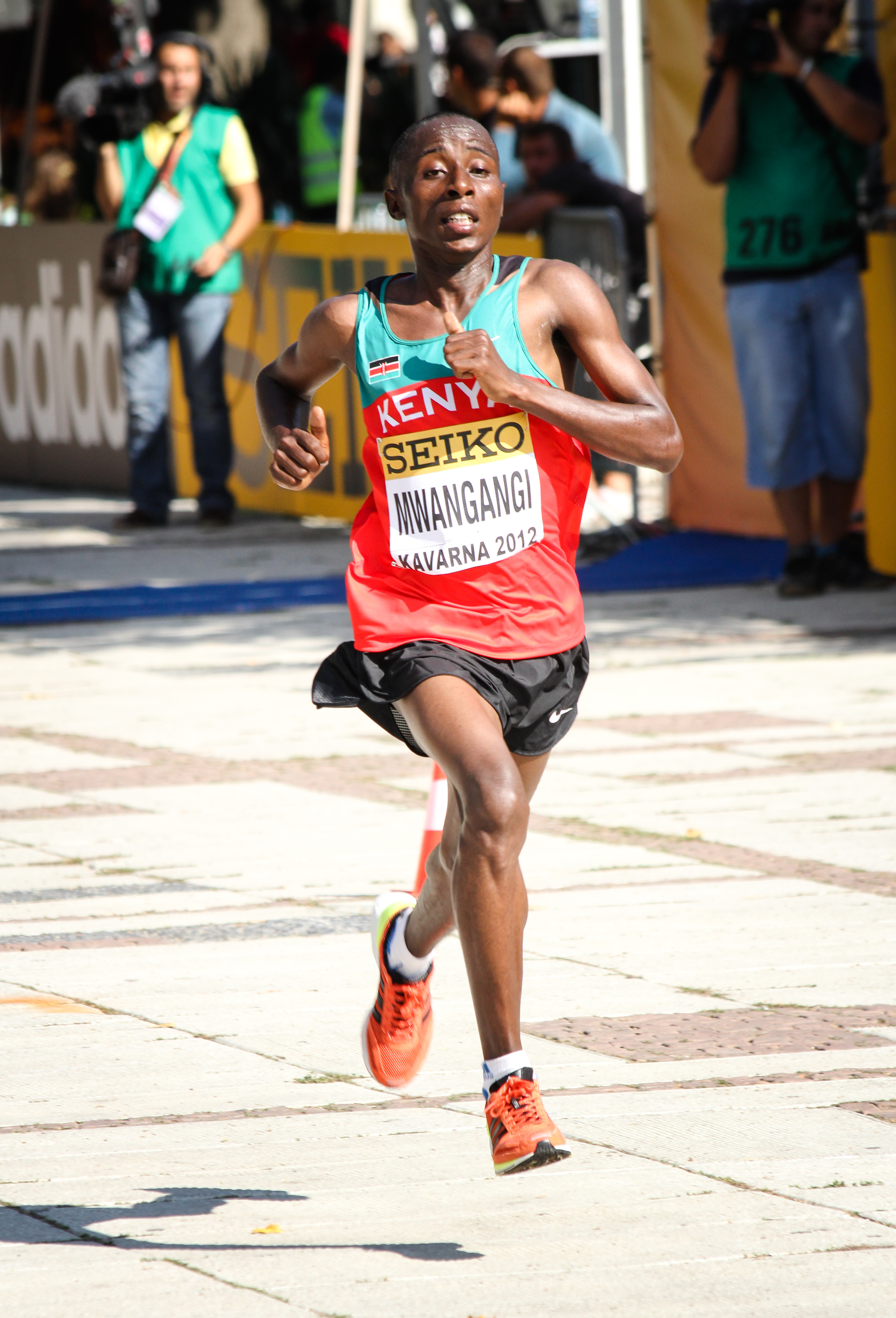
- John Nzau Mwangangi at the 2012 World Half Marathon Championships in Kavarna, Bulgaria

Medal record

Men's athletics

Representing Kenya

World Half Marathon Championships
Bronze medal – third place	2012 Kavarna	Individual
Gold medal – first place	2012 Kavarna	Team

African Cross Country Championships
Gold medal – first place	2011 Cape Town	Senior race

John Nzau Mwangangi (born 1 November 1990) is a Kenyan long-distance runner who competes over distances ranging from 5000 metres to the half marathon. He was the gold medallist at the 2011 African Cross Country Championships. He has won a number of high-profile European road races, including the Dam tot Damloop, 20 Kilomètres de Paris, Greifenseelauf, the Valencia Half Marathon and the Valencia Marathon.

== Career ==
Born in Mwingi in Kenya's Eastern Province, he had his first European race wins in 2008, taking the titles at the Greifenseelauf and Morat-Fribourg Murtenlauf races. He first came to prominence in the 2009 season. After finishing as runner-up at the Kenya Prison Service cross country and 5000 metres championships, he won the 20 km de Lausanne and 10-mile Grand Prix von Bern. He won his first international medal in August, taking the silver medal over 5000 m at the 2009 African Junior Athletics Championships. He then returned to the European road circuit and had a string of victories: he retained his Greifenseelauf and Morat-Fribourg titles, won the Route du Vin half marathon in a personal best of 60:36 minutes, and also won the shorter La Corrida Bulloise and Basel Stadtlauf races.

His 2010 season began with his first victory at the Kenya Prisons Cross Country, where he beat Silas Kiplagat. In March ran 59:56 minutes to dip under the hour mark for the first time at the City-Pier-City Half Marathon, taking third in a close race. He won the Rabat Half Marathon in April. In September he won the Dam tot Damloop, placed second at the Tilburg 10K, then came fourth at the Singelloop Utrecht. He ended his season on a high with wins at the 20 Kilomètres de Paris and the Valencia Half Marathon.

Silas Kiplagat defeated Mwangangi at the Prisons Cross Country in 2011, but he rebounded by lifting the inaugural men's senior title at the 2011 African Cross Country Championships. That same month he ran at the Lisbon Half Marathon and came runner-up behind Zersenay Tadese, who ran the then-second-fastest time ever. He defended his title at the Rabat Half Marathon a month later. In the second half of the season, he came third at the Dam tot Damloop in a 10-mile best time of 45:13 minutes. He won for a second consecutive time at the Paris 20K then completed the same feat at the Valencia Half Marathon, where he improved his best over the distance to 59:45 minutes. In December he came third at the Montferland Run. He was runner-up to Zersenay Tadese at the Lisbon Half Marathon in March 2012. He was one of the pacemakers at the 2012 Rotterdam Marathon and the top two runners finished under two hours and five minutes. At the 2012 World Half Marathon Championships in Kavarna, Bulgaria, he won the bronze medal in a time of 1:01:01 hours, and helped his teammates to win the team title. His last outing over that distance that year, saw him finish as runner-up in Valencia.

He ran at the Kenyan Cross Country Championships at the start of 2013, but did not make the team for the global event, ending up 14th. He also failed to make the national team in the 10,000 m that year. He fared better on the roads, winning the Media Maratón Santa Pola and Luanda Half Marathon races. He ran a season's best of 60:37 minutes for third at the Valencia Half. His marathon debut that year resulted in a time of 2:09:32 hours for fifth place at the Rotterdam Marathon.
