= Mai Ito =

Japanese long-distance runner

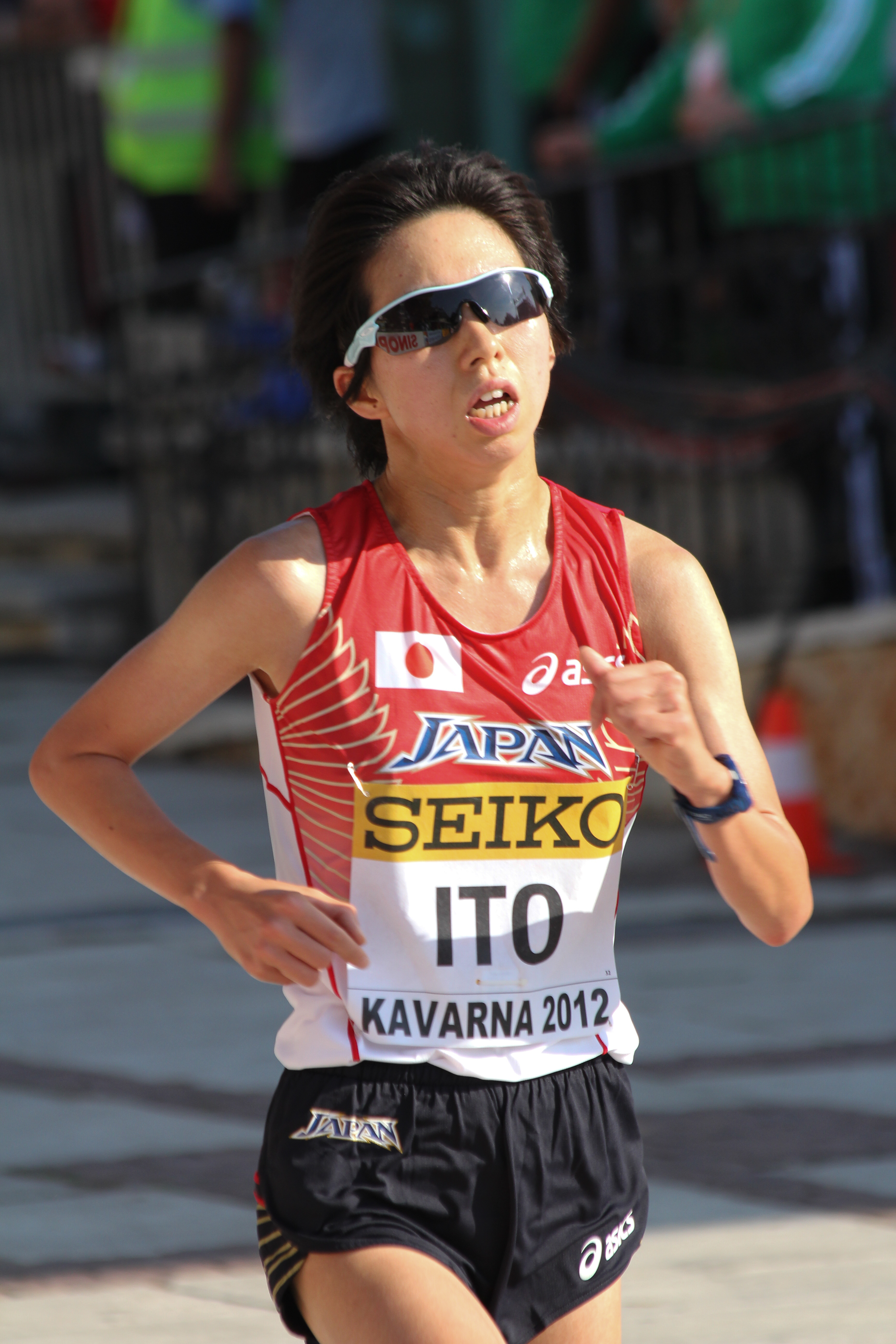
Mai Ito of Japan at the 2012 World Half Marathon Championships in Kavarna, Bulgaria

Mai Ito (伊藤 舞, Itō Mai; born 23 May 1984) is a Japanese long-distance runner who competes in half marathon and marathon races. She represented Japan in the marathon at the 2011 World Championships in Athletics and competed at the 2012 IAAF World Half Marathon Championships, taking the team bronze medal.

She holds personal bests of 70 minutes for the half marathon and 2:25:26 hours for the marathon. Ito was runner-up at the 2011 Osaka Ladies Marathon, won the 2012 Sapporo Half Marathon, and placed in the top ten at the 2013 London Marathon.

== Career ==
Born in Nara, Nara, she attended Kyoto Tachibana High School then went on to Kyoto Sangyo University. Initially she was interested in volleyball but she gradually focused on long-distance running instead. Injuries blighted her early career but with a 10,000 metres win at the 2006 Japanese Collegiate Championships (in her final year of study) she her begin to establish herself. That same year she also won the Kyoto Half Marathon in a personal best of 71:11 minutes.

In 2008, she joined up with the Otsuka Pharmaceutical corporate running team and began training under their director Kono Tadashi. The 2009 season brought results as she ran a string of personal bests, improving to 9:18.69 minutes for the 3000 metres, 15:55.64 minutes in the 5000 metres (coming sixth at the Japanese National Games) and 32:27.04 minutes for the 10,000 m. She also won the half marathon section at the Shanghai Marathon and placed fourth at that year's Sendai Half Marathon. She bettered her three track times again in 2010 (9:17.41, 15:48.35 and 32:14.43 minutes). She also made her debut over the marathon distance and surprised more seasoned competitors by taking fourth place with a run of 2:29:13 hours at the Nagoya Marathon.

At the 2011 Osaka Ladies Marathon she led the pack and split away to duel against Yukiko Akaba. Ito managed second place and a new best of 2:26:55 was enough to gain selection for the 2011 World Championships in Athletics. At the World Championships Marathon in Daegu she finished 22nd overall, but was last out of the five-woman Japanese squad. At the end of the year she set a best of 70:03 minutes to come fourth at the Sanyo Half Marathon.

She remained in good form in the 2012 season, running 70:39 for fifth at the Kagawa-Marugame Half Marathon and a best of 2:25:26 hours for fifth at the Nagoya Marathon. A win at the Sapporo Half Marathon followed in July and this led to an appearances at the 2012 IAAF World Half Marathon Championships, where she was ninth and helped the Japanese women to the team bronze. In a quick field at November's Yokohama Women's Marathon she was the fifth-placer and second Japanese with a time of 2:27:06 hours.

Ito started 2013 with a personal best at the Berlin Half Marathon, taking third place with seventy minutes exactly. A run at the 2013 London Marathon later that month saw her take seventh place in the high-profile race.

== Personal bests ==
- 3000 metres - 9:17.41 min (2010)
- 5000 metres – 15:48.35 (2010)
- 10,000 metres – 32:14.43 (2010)
- Half marathon – 1:09:57 (2015)
- Marathon – 2:24:42 (2015)
