= Evans Cheruiyot =

Kenyan long-distance runner

Evans Kiprop Cheruiyot
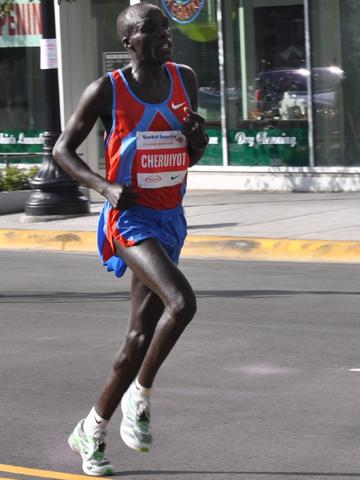
- Cheruiyot during 2008 Chicago Marathon

Personal information
- Born: May 10, 1982 (age 44) Kapkoi village, Keiyo District, Kenya

Sport
- Country: Kenya

Achievements and titles
- Personal best(s): 10,000 m: 27:29; Half marathon: 59:05; Marathon: 2:06:25

Evans Kiprop Cheruiyot (born May 10, 1982, in Kapkoi village, Keiyo District) is a Kenyan long-distance runner who competes in the marathon. He started out as a half marathon runner, taking wins in Rotterdam and Nairobi, and won his debut marathon race in Milan in 2007. He won the Chicago Marathon in 2008, running a personal best of 2:06:25 hours.

Cheruiyot has also represented Kenya internationally and was the bronze medallist at the 2007 IAAF World Road Running Championships.

== Background ==
A mechanic by training, Cheruiyot is the seventh-born of a family of nine. After graduating from Kapkoi Primary School, in Rift Valley Province's Keiyo District, he took a mechanical engineering and driving course upon joining the National Youth Service (NYS). With the NYS, he started running. He began his competitive career in October 2004 with a third-place finish in a 10,000 metres race after completing his program in NYS. Four weeks later, he won his debut in the half marathon at the Standard Chartered Nairobi race with a time of 1:04:24. After competing in several cross-country competitions in France, he won his second half marathon race, the Humarathon, in April 2005. He ran in several other races in 2005 until he got stranded in France along with 14 teammates without money, food and shelter in December until the Kenyan embassy rescued them.

In 2006, he ran a sub one-hour half marathon in a second-place finish at the Berlin Half Marathon, and he was a nationally ranked runner according to Running Times. His 2006 half marathon time ranked him in the top ten of all time.

At the 2007 IAAF World Road Running Championships he finished third and was part of the Kenyan team that won the team race. He won the 2007 Rotterdam Half Marathon and made his full marathon debut later that year, taking victory at the Milan Marathon in December. He had previously beaten elite fields and runners such as namesake Robert Kipkoech Cheruiyot. In his second outing over the full distance, he won the Chicago Marathon held on October 12, 2008, with a time of 2:06:25.

His 2009 season was less successful – he was eighth at the Boston Marathon and then fifth at the Fukuoka Marathon in Japan. A serious injury ruled him out of competitive running for the latter half of 2009 and all of 2010. He made his comeback at the 2011 Dubai Marathon and demonstrated a return to form by finishing as the runner-up behind David Barmasai with a time of 2:08:17.

== Achievements ==
Year	Competition	Venue	Position	Event	Notes
Representing Kenya|
2006	Udine Half Marathon	Udine, Italy	1st	Half-Marathon	1:00:18
2007	Rotterdam Half Marathon	Rotterdam, Netherlands	1st	Half-Marathon	59:13
2007	Milan Marathon	Milan, Italy	1st	Marathon	2:09:16
2008	Chicago Marathon	Chicago, United States	1st	Marathon	2:06:25
2007	Rotterdam Half Marathon	Rotterdam, Netherlands	1st	Half-Marathon	59:13
