= Deressa Chimsa =

Ethiopian long-distance runner

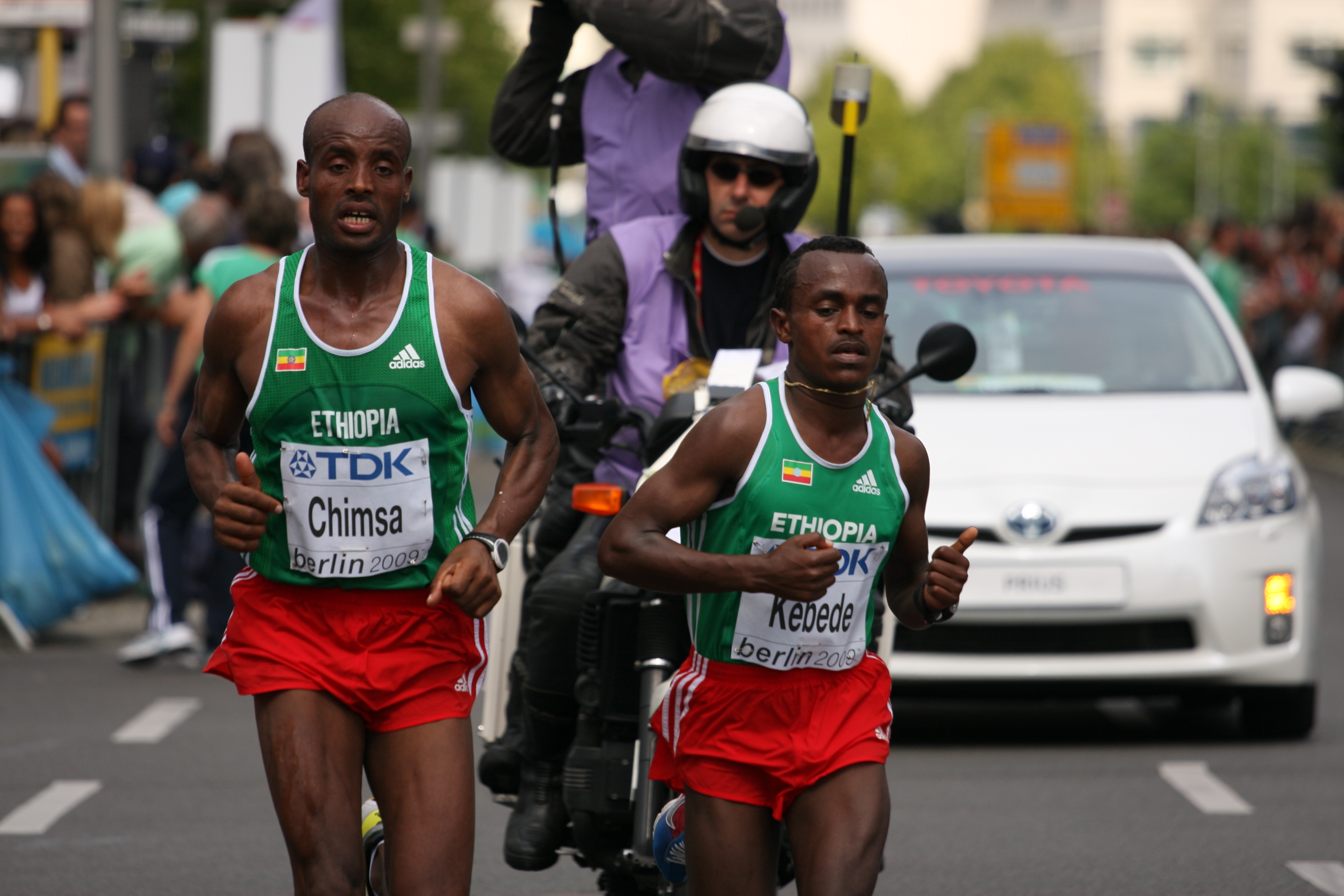
Deressa Chimsa (left) and Tsegaye Kebede

Deressa Chimsa Edae (born 21 November 1976) is an Ethiopian long-distance runner who competes in marathon races. He represented Ethiopia in the event at the 2009 World Championships in Athletics. His personal best of 2:05:42 hours was set at the 2012 Dubai Marathon. He won the Daegu Marathon in 2010.

== Biography ==
Hailing from Addis Ababa, Deressa began running at a young age and trained for a long time in order to take up running professionally. His first major race came at the age of 31 at the 2008 Dubai Marathon. Unlike the other top runners at the competition, he paid for his own travel and expenses in order to participate. His performance lifted him into the elite athlete ranks as he came seventh in a time of 2:10:16 hours. His next outing at the Eindhoven Marathon later that year was less successful and he came twelfth some five minutes behind the winner Geoffrey Mutai. He returned to the Dubai race the following year and he showed significant improvement by finishing as runner-up to Haile Gebrselassie. He set a new personal best 2:07:54 hours and received US$100,000 for his placing. He won the Ethiopian half marathon championship race and gained selection for the Ethiopian marathon team for the 2009 World Championships in Athletics. At the World Championships he was among the leading pack at 30 km, fell back to sixth by 40 km, then dropped out entirely from the race.

He recovered from this setback by winning his first marathon in April 2010, taking the men's title at the Daegu Marathon. He tried his hand at the shorter half marathon distance in November, running at the New Delhi Half Marathon, but finished 14th in a large field with a time of 62:22 minutes. He attended the Dubai Marathon for a third year running and took fourth in a time of 2:09:08 hours. He ran in his first World Marathon Majors event that April, entering the 2011 Boston Marathon and in a very fast race (Geoffrey Mutai ran a world's best time on the downhill course) he managed eighth place.

His next competition, the 2012 Dubai Marathon, again featured a fast field and saw many athletes run under two hours and six minutes. Deressa was among them, recording a time of 2:05:42 and finishing in eighth place just behind Abdullah Dawit. A few months later he had his first win in Europe. At the Prague Marathon he was the front runner after the half-way point and gradually increased his lead to win the race in a time of 2:06:25 hours (the second fastest recorded on the course at that point). At the 2012 World Half Marathon Championships, he ran a well-controlled race and won the silver medal, in a time of 1:00:51 hours - a new personal best. The Frankfurt Marathon saw him place second behind Patrick Makau with a run of 2:06:52 in chilly conditions.

He missed most of the 2013 season but made a good return winning the Toronto Waterfront Marathon with a course record run of 2:07:05 hours.
