= Meseret Hailu =

Ethiopian long-distance runner (born 1990)

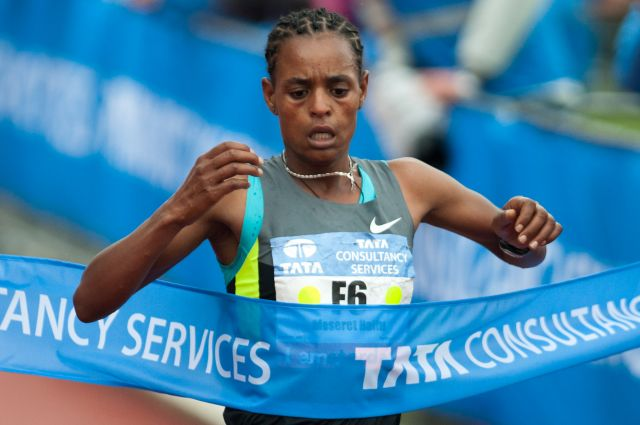
- Meseret Hailu at the finish of her winning race at the 2012 Amsterdam Marathon

Medal record

Women's athletics

Representing Ethiopia

IAAF World Half Marathon Championships
Gold medal – first place	2012 Kavarna	Half marathon

Meseret Hailu Debele (born 12 September 1990) is an Ethiopian long-distance runner who competes in half marathons and marathons. She was the gold medallist at the 2012 IAAF World Half Marathon Championships and won the Amsterdam Marathon that same year. Her personal bests are 2:21:09 hours for the marathon and 66:56 minutes for the half marathon.

Meseret began competing in international road races as a teenager, beginning in 2009 with a win at the Dez Milhas Garoto and a runner-up finish at the Río de Janeiro Half Marathon in Brazil. She began to focus on the marathon thereafter, running three races over the distance in 2010. She ran 2:45:10 on her debut in Pyongyang, came fourth at the Kuala Lumpur Marathon, then made a big improvement at the La Rochelle Marathon by finishing second with a time of 2:30:42 hours.

She came ninth at the 2011 Mumbai Marathon, was runner-up by seven second at the Belgrade Marathon, and came fifth at the Reims Marathon. She was also third at that year's Route du Vin Half Marathon.

The 2012 season marked a significant career breakthrough for Meseret. She won her first major race at the Egmond Half Marathon with a personal best of 71:18 minutes, beating former half marathon world champion Florence Kiplagat. A third-place performance at the Prague Marathon saw her knock three minutes off her best with a time of 2:27:15 hours. Her strong performance in Egmond earned her a place on the Ethiopian team for the 2012 IAAF World Half Marathon Championships. In her first race for her country she exceeded expectations by running a personal best of 68:55 minutes and pipped her teammate Feyse Tadese to the finish to take the gold medal. Later that month she entered the Amsterdam Marathon and surged away in the final stages to gain her first win over the distance, breaking the course record with her time of 2:21:09 hours.

She knocked almost two minutes off her best at the 2013 RAK Half Marathon, running an Ethiopian record of 66:56 minutes for fourth place (and tenth on the all-time lists).

Hailu finished second behind Rita Jeptoo at the 2013 Boston Marathon, a performance that earned her selection to Ethiopian team to contest the marathon at the 2013 world championships. However, she dropped out of the world championship race, held in hot and humid conditions in Moscow, after just 5 km. Her early withdrawal, together with that of team-mate Tiki Gelana, prompted the Ethiopian Athletic Federation to ask the pair to submit written explanations for their actions.
