= Feyse Tadese =

Ethiopian long-distance runner (born 1988)

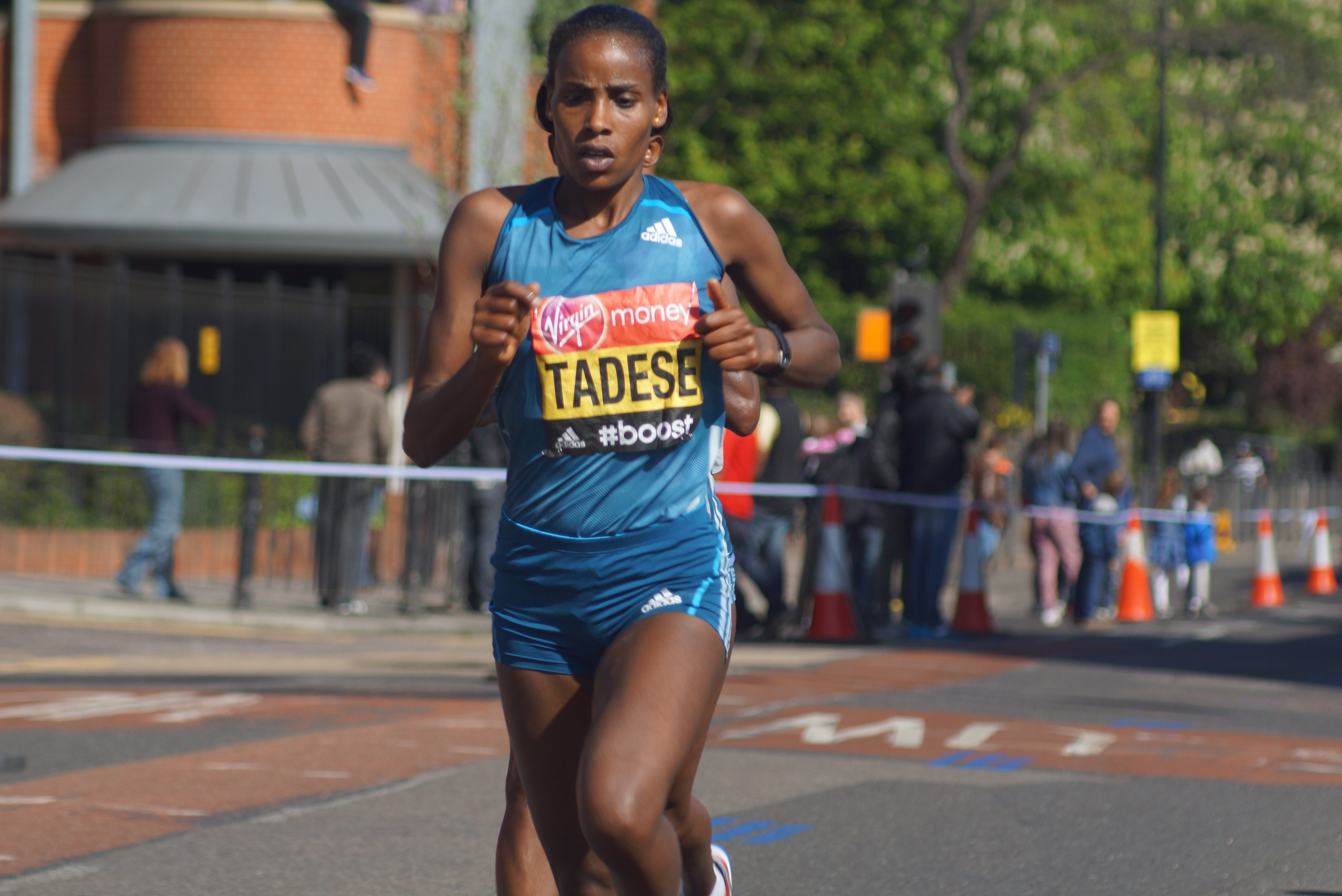
Tadese at the 2014 London Marathon

Feyse Tadese Boru (born 19 November 1988) is an Ethiopian long-distance runner who competes in the half marathon.

== Career ==
She made her marathon debut at the 2009 Venice Marathon and finished in tenth place with a time of 2:36:57. Feyse gained her first international selection for Ethiopia at the 2010 IAAF World Cross Country Championships in Bydgoszcz. She finished seventh on her senior debut at the event and helped an Ethiopian team of Meselech Melkamu, Tirunesh Dibaba and Mamitu Daska to the silver medal in the team race behind Kenya.

Later that season, she won the Bologna Half Marathon with a time of 1:10:08, which was enough to gain her selection for the 2010 IAAF World Half Marathon Championships. She ran a personal best time of 1:09:28 at the championships in Nanning to finish in fourth place, sharing in the team silver medal alongside Dire Tune and Meseret Mengistu. She ended her breakthrough year with a personal best run of 1:08:50 at the Delhi Half Marathon, where she was seventh.

Her first marathon of 2011 came in January at the Dubai Marathon, where she finished tenth. She won the Rabat Half Marathon in a personal best of 1:08:44 hours in April, then was runner-up at the Jakarta International 10K the month after. She ran a personal best time of 2:25:20 hours at the Eindhoven Marathon in October 2011, finishing third just behind fellow Ethiopian Shitaye Bedaso. In November, she won the 10km de Marseille and the Cross de l'Acier. She opened 2012 with her second fastest performance of 1:09:15 hours for fourth place at the RAK Half Marathon. A new marathon best came at the Seoul International Marathon a month later and her time of 2:23:26 hours was enough to win her first race over the distance. Her good form continued at the Yangzhou Jianzhen International Half Marathon, where she was runner-up to Kenyan Fyles Ongori.

Her first individual global medal came at the 2012 IAAF World Half Marathon Championships, where she led until the final stages, ending up second behind teammate Meseret Hailu. A personal best and course record followed at the Shanghai Marathon, which she won in a time of 2:23:07 hours.

She ran at the RAK Half Marathon for a second year running and set a best of 68:35 minutes, coming ninth in a fast field. She won the 2013 Paris Marathon, setting a new race record of 2:21:06 hours.

== Competition record ==
Year	Competition	Venue	Position	Notes
2010	World Cross Country Championships	Bydgoszcz, Poland	7th	Senior race
2010	World Cross Country Championships	Bydgoszcz, Poland	2nd	Team race
2010	World Half Marathon Championships	Nanning, China	4th	Half marathon
2010	World Half Marathon Championships	Nanning, China	2nd	Team race
2012	World Half Marathon Championships	Kavarna, Bulgaria	2nd	Half marathon
2012	World Half Marathon Championships	Kavarna, Bulgaria	1st	Team race
