= Tewelde Estifanos =

Eritrean long-distance runner

Tewelde Estifanos Hidru
Personal information
- Nationality: Eritrean
- Born: 2 November 1981 (age 44)

Sport
- Sport: Track and field
- Event: Marathon

Tewelde Estifanos Hidru (born 2 November 1981) is an Eritrean long-distance runner who specialises in the marathon. He competed in the men's marathon event at the 2016 Summer Olympics where he finished in 60th place with a time of 2:19:12.
