= Tomomi Tanaka =

Japanese long-distance runner

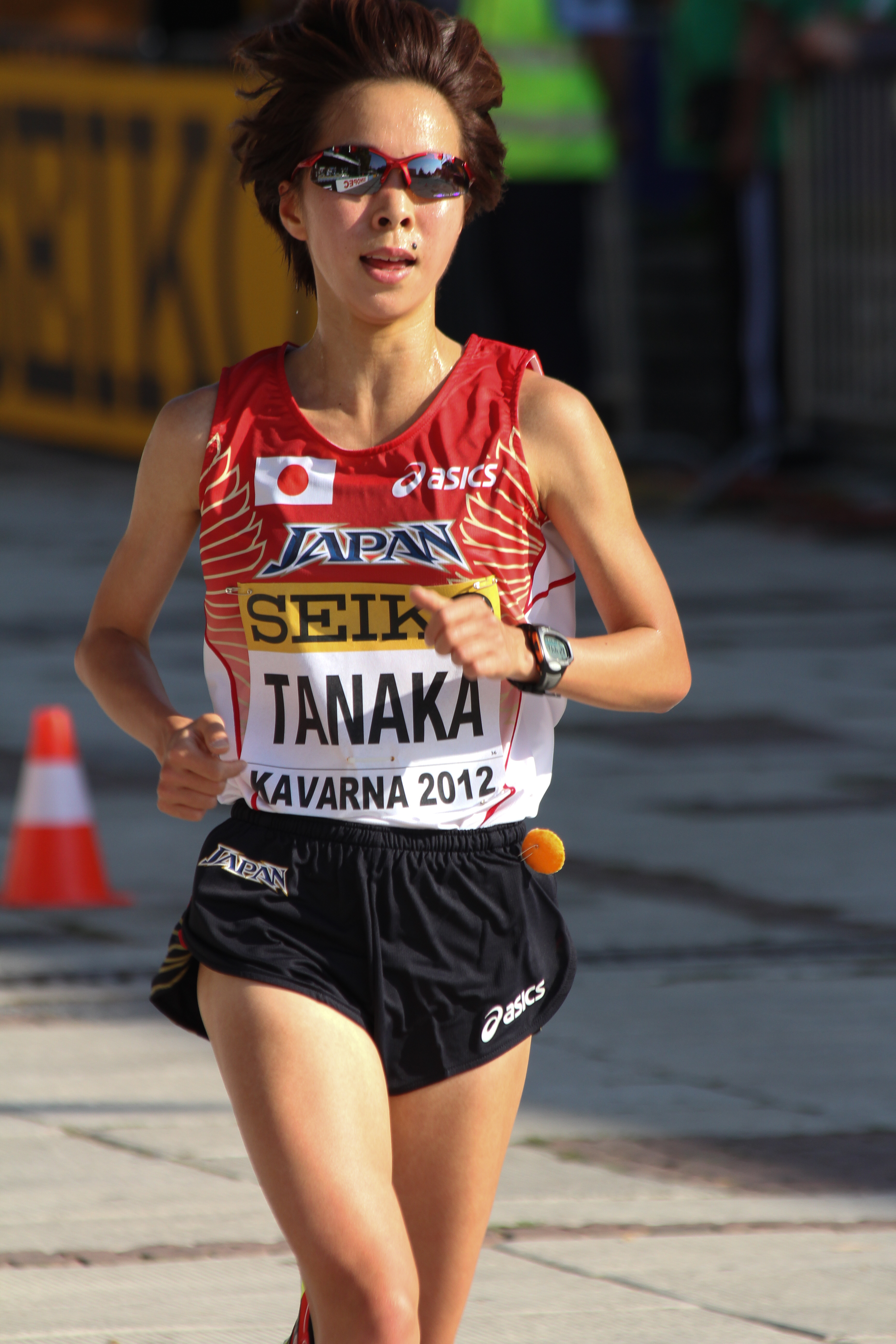
- Tomomi Tanaka of Japan at the 2012 World Half Marathon Championships in Kavarna, Bulgaria

Personal information
- Born: 25 January 1988 (age 37) Narita, Chiba, Japan

Sport
- Sport: Track and field
- Event: Marathon

Tomomi Tanaka (田中 智美, Tanaka Tomomi; born 25 January 1988) is a Japanese long-distance runner who specialises in the marathon. She competed in the women's marathon event at the 2016 Summer Olympics.
