= 2010 in the sport of athletics =

2010 in athletics
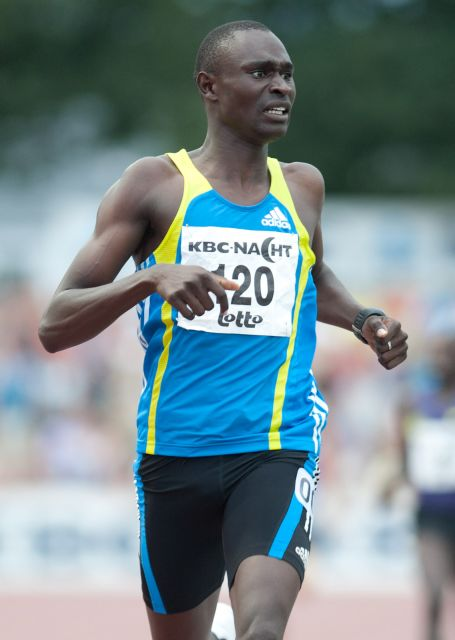
- David Rudisha twice broke the 800 m world record
- Major world events: 2010 World Indoor Championships
- World records set: 10
- New competitions: IAAF Diamond League

In 2010 there was no obvious, primary athletics championship, as neither the Summer Olympics nor the World Championships in Athletics occurred in the year. The foremost championships to be held in 2010 included: the 2010 IAAF World Indoor Championships, 2010 European Athletics Championships, 2010 African Championships in Athletics, and Athletics at the 2010 Commonwealth Games.

Two major competitions debuted in new formats. The IAAF Diamond League – a worldwide expansion on the European-centred IAAF Golden League concept – saw a schedule of fourteen one-day meetings with some of the sport's most prominent athletes centrally contracted to a track and field series for the first time. The second competition was the renamed IAAF Continental Cup (formerly World Cup) which had its format simplified: previously a contest between several countries and continents, it comprised only four teams (Africa, the Americas, Europe and Asia/Oceania).

== Major events ==
=== World ===
- World Indoor Championships in Athletics
- World Junior Championships in Athletics
- Continental Cup
- Commonwealth Games
- Summer Youth Olympics
- IAAF Diamond League
- World Marathon Majors
- World Cross Country Championships
- World Half Marathon Championships
- IAAF World Race Walking Cup
- WMRA World Mountain Running Championships

=== Regional ===
- African Championships
- Asian Indoor Championships
- Asian Junior Championships
- Asian Games
- Central American and Caribbean Games
- Central American Games
- European Athletics Championships
- European Cross Country Championships
- European Cup Winter Throwing
- European Mountain Running Championships
- European Team Championships
- Ibero-American Championships
- Micronesian Games
- NACAC Cross Country Championships
- South American Games
- South American U23 Championships
- South American Cross Country Championships
- South Asian Games
- South Asian Junior Championships
- Oceania Athletics Championships
- Oceania Cross Country Championships

=== National ===
- 2010 American Samoa Athletics Championships
- 2010 German Athletics Championships
- 2010 Guam Athletics Championships
- 2010 Kiribati Athletics Championships
- 2010 Latvian Athletics Championships
- 2010 Lithuanian Athletics Championships
- 2010 USA Outdoor Track and Field Championships

=== Local ===
- 2010 Vilnius Athletics Championships

== World records ==
=== Men ===
Event	Athlete	Nation	Performance	Meeting	Place	Date
800 m	David Rudisha	Kenya	1:41.09	ISTAF	Berlin, Germany	22 August
800 m	David Rudisha	Kenya	1:41.01	Rieti Meeting	Rieti, Italy	29 August
10 km (road)	Leonard Komon	Kenya	26:44	Singelloop	Utrecht, Netherlands	26 September
15 km (road)	Leonard Komon	Kenya	41:13	Zevenheuvelenloop	Nijmegen, Netherlands	21 November
20 km (road)	Zersenay Tadese	Eritrea	55:21+	Lisbon Half Marathon	Lisbon, Portugal	21 March
Half marathon	Zersenay Tadese	Eritrea	58:23	Lisbon Half Marathon	Lisbon, Portugal	21 March
25 km (road)	Samuel Kosgei	Kenya	1:11:50	BIG 25 Berlin	Berlin, Germany	9 May
Triple jump (indoor)	Teddy Tamgho	France	17.90 m	World Indoor Championships	Doha, Qatar	14 March
Indoor heptathlon	Ashton Eaton	United States	6499 pts	NCAA Indoor Championship	Fayetteville, Arkansas, United States	12–13 March

=== Women ===
Event	Athlete	Nation	Performance	Meeting	Place	Date
Hammer throw	Anita Włodarczyk	Poland	78.30	Enea Cup	Bydgoszcz, Poland	6 June
25 km (road)	Mary Keitany	Kenya	1:19:53	BIG 25 Berlin	Berlin, Germany	9 May
4 × 800 m relay (indoor)	Tatyana Andrianova; Oksana Spasovhodskaja; Yelena Kofanova; Yevgeniya Zinurova	Russia (Moscow-1 Team)	8:12.41	Russian Indoor Championships	Moscow, Russia	28 February

== Season's bests ==
Best marks of the year
Event	Men			Women		
Event	Athlete	Mark	Notes	Athlete	Mark	Notes
60 metres	Dwain Chambers (GBR)	6.48		LaVerne Jones-Ferrette (ISV)	6.97	NR
100 metres	Tyson Gay (USA) Nesta Carter (JAM)	9.78		Veronica Campbell-Brown (JAM)	10.78	
200 metres	Usain Bolt (JAM)	19.56		Veronica Campbell-Brown (JAM)	21.98	
400 metres	Jeremy Wariner (USA)	44.13		Debbie Dunn (USA)	49.64	
800 metres	David Rudisha (KEN)	1:41.01	WR	Alysia Johnson (USA)	1:57.34	
1500 metres	Silas Kiplagat (KEN)	3:29.27		Anna Alminova (RUS)	3:57.65	
3000 metres	Tariku Bekele (ETH)	7:28.70		Meseret Defar (ETH)	8:24.46	Indoors
5000 metres	Eliud Kipchoge (KEN)	12:51.21		Vivian Cheruiyot (KEN)	14:27.41	
10,000 metres	Josphat Kiprono Menjo (KEN)	26:56.74		Meselech Melkamu (ETH)	31:04.52	
60 metres hurdles	Dayron Robles (CUB)	7.34		Lolo Jones (USA)	7.72	
100/110 metres hurdles	David Oliver (USA)	12.89	NR	Priscilla Lopes-Schliep (CAN)	12.52	
400 metres hurdles	Bershawn Jackson (USA)	47.32		Lashinda Demus (USA)	52.82	
3000 metres steeplechase	Brimin Kipruto (KEN)	8:00.90		Milcah Chemos Cheywa (KEN)	9:11.71	
10 kilometres	Leonard Komon (KEN)	26:44	WR	Lineth Chepkurui (KEN)	30:45	
15 kilometres	Leonard Komon (KEN)	41:13	WR	Peninah Arusei (KEN)	47:48	
20 kilometres	Zersenay Tadese (ERI)	55:21	WR	Mare Dibaba (ETH)	1:03:47	
Half marathon	Zersenay Tadese (ERI)	58:23	WR	Elvan Abeylegesse (TUR)	1:07:07	
25 kilometres	Samuel Kiplimo Kosgei (KEN)	1:11:50	WR	Mary Keitany (KEN)	1:19:53	WR
30 kilometres	Tsegaye Kebede (ETH)	1:28:46		Atsede Baysa (ETH)	1:39:28	
Marathon	Patrick Makau (KEN)	2:04:48		Liliya Shobukhova (RUS)	2:20:25	
20 kilometres race walk	Alex Schwazer (ITA)	1:18:24		Anisya Kirdyapkina (RUS)	1:25:11	
50 kilometres race walk	Yohan Diniz (FRA)	3:40:37		—		
Pole vault	Steven Hooker (AUS)	6.01 m	Indoors	Jennifer Suhr (USA)	4.89 m	
High jump	Ivan Ukhov (RUS)	2.38 m	Indoors	Blanka Vlašić (CRO)	2.06 m	Indoors
Long jump	Christian Reif (GER)	8.47 m		Olga Kucherenko (RUS)	7.13 m	
Triple jump	Teddy Tamgho (FRA)	17.98 m		Olga Rypakova (KAZ)	15.25 m	AR
Shot put	Christian Cantwell (USA)	22.41 m		Nadzeya Ostapchuk (BLR)	21.70 m	Indoors
Discus throw	Gerd Kanter (EST)	71.45 m		Nadine Müller (GER)	67.78 m	
Javelin throw	Andreas Thorkildsen (NOR)	90.37 m		Maria Abakumova (RUS)	68.89 m	
Hammer throw	Koji Murofushi (JPN)	80.99 m		Anita Wlodarczyk (POL)	78.30 m	WR
Pentathlon	—			Jessica Ennis (GBR)	4937 pts	NR
Heptathlon	Ashton Eaton (USA)	6499 pts	WR	Jessica Ennis (GBR)	6823 pts	
Decathlon	Bryan Clay (USA)	8483 pts		—		
4 × 100 metres relay	United States; Trell Kimmons; Wallace Spearmon; Tyson Gay; Michael Rodgers	37.45		Ukraine; Olesya Povh; Nataliya Pohrebnyak; Mariya Ryemyen; Elizaveta Bryzhina	42.29	
4 × 400 metres relay	United States U23; LeJerald Betters; O'Neal Wilder; Joey Hughes; Tavaris Tate	2:58.83		Russia; Anastasiya Kapachinskaya; Antonina Krivoshapka; Kseniya Ustalova; Tatyana Firova	3:21.26	

== Awards ==
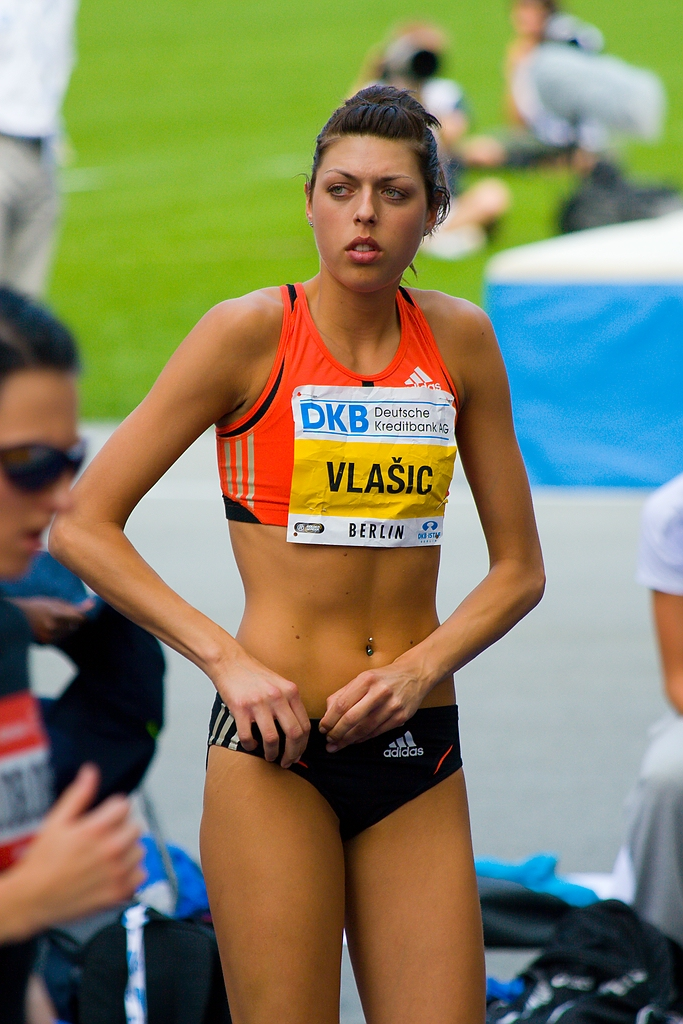
Blanka Vlašić topped the IAAF, Track & Field News and European Athletics polls.

=== Men ===
Award	Winner
IAAF World Athlete of the Year	David Rudisha (KEN)
Track & Field Athlete of the Year	David Rudisha (KEN)
European Athlete of the Year	Christophe Lemaitre (FRA)
European Athletics Rising Star	Teddy Tamgho (FRA)

=== Women ===
Award	Winner
IAAF World Athlete of the Year	Blanka Vlašić (CRO)
Track & Field Athlete of the Year	Blanka Vlašić (CRO)
European Athlete of the Year	Blanka Vlašić (CRO)
European Athletics Rising Star	Sandra Perković (CRO)

== Doping ==
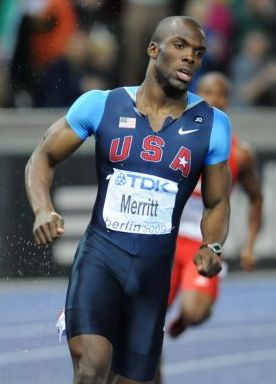
American sprinter LaShawn Merritt was banned from competition for 21 months.

The highest profile doping case in 2010 was that of 400 m Olympic and World Champion LaShawn Merritt. He failed three out-of-competition tests in October and December 2009, and January 2010, testing positive for Dehydroepiandrosterone (DHEA) on each occasion. He claimed that he had inadvertently ingested the substance via an over the counter sex enhancement drug he was using at the time (ExtenZe). Initially set for a two-year ban, he received a reduced 21-month suspension from October 2010 to July 2012 as a result of his co-operation with anti-doping authorities. However, the seriousness of the doping substance meant he was automatically banned from defending his title at the 2012 London Olympics.

A major investigation by the Guardia Civil into doping in Spain, known as Operación Galgo, began in April 2010 and made headline news in December following a number of arrests. Marta Domínguez, world steeplechase champion and vice president of the Spanish Athletics Federation, was implicated in the blood doping ring. Manuel Pascua Piqueras, coach to a number of prominent runners, admitted to doping his athletes, while Alemayehu Bezabeh (the 2009 European Cross Country Champion) admitted to using banned substances.

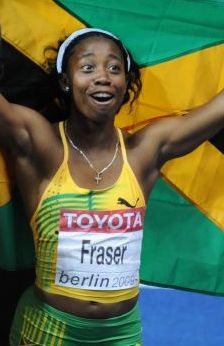
Shelly-Ann Fraser received a six-month suspension for using a banned painkiller.

Olympic champion Shelly-Ann Fraser received a six-month ban after a positive test for pain relief narcotic oxycodone at the Shanghai Diamond League meeting. Her coach Stephen Francis, who had the painkiller on prescription for his kidney stones, gave the banned substance to his athlete to relieve her toothache.

Another sprinter Laverne Jones-Ferrette ran the fastest 60 metres in a decade in February, but was absent from outdoor competition in 2010. This was later explained by the revelation that she had failed a drug test for clomiphene on February 16. The substance can be used as a complement to steroid cycles, but can also act as a fertility drug and Jones-Ferrette (who announced her pregnancy in November) claimed this was the intended usage. She was banned from competition for six months, lasting from April to September, and lost her silver medal from the World Indoor Championships. Bobby-Gaye Wilkins won a relay medal for Jamaica at the same championships, but she was also stripped of her medal after testing positive for andarine – a selective androgen receptor modulator (SARM).

A series of athletes were disqualified from the 2010 Commonwealth Games in New Delhi as a result of in-competition testing. Nigerians Samuel Okon and Oludamola Osayomi (the 100 m gold medallist) were banned for using the stimulant methylhexanamine. A third Nigerian, Folashade Abugan who won silver medals in the 400 m individual and relay races, failed a drug test for traces of testosterone prohormone and was stripped of her honours Indian racewalker Rani Yadav was also banned after testing positive for 19-Norandrosterone.

Retired American sprinters Ramon Clay and Crystal Cox received retrospective bans from the United States Anti-Doping Agency due to their steroid usage relating to the BALCO scandal period from 2001 to 2004. Cox was stripped of her Olympic relay gold medal as a result. Former Jamaican runner Raymond Stewart was given a life ban from coaching for trafficking and administering banned substances as part of an ongoing investigation. Olympic Bahraini sprinter Roqaya Al-Gassra was banned for two years. Other prominent athletes to receive suspensions included South American triple jump champion Johana Triviño (two years for stanozolol), Asian indoor champion Munira Saleh (life ban for second violation with stanozolol), and 2010 CAC Games medallist Zudikey Rodríguez (methylhexanamine).

== Deaths ==
- February 6 — Kipkemboi Kimeli (43), Kenyan long-distance runner
- February 17 — Luigi Ulivelli (74), Italian long jumper and Mediterranean champion
- February 17 — David Lelei (38), Kenyan middle-distance runner and Africa Games medallist
- March 2 — Paul Drayton (70), American sprinter and 1960 Olympic medallist
- March 17 — Wayne Collett (60), American sprinter and 1972 Olympic medallist
- August 10 — Antonio Pettigrew (42), American 400 m runner and 1991 World Champion
- August 18 — Hal Connolly (79), American hammer thrower and 1956 Olympic champion
- August 26 — Frank Baumgartl (55), East German Olympic steeplechase medallist
- August 29 — Dejene Berhanu (29), Ethiopian marathon runner
- October 8 — Jim Fuchs (82), American world record holder in the shot put
- November 14 — Wes Santee (78), American middle-distance runner and former world record holder

== See also ==
- Eufemiano Fuentes
