= Flomena Chepchirchir =

Kenyan long-distance runner (born 1981)

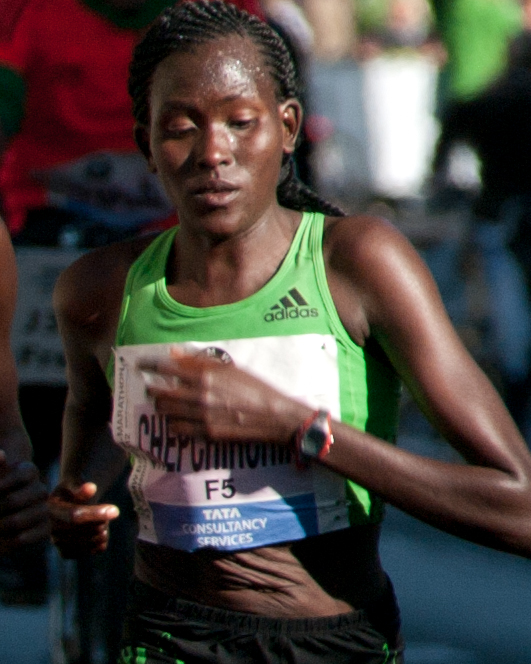
Chepchirchir during the Berlin Marathon 2012

Flomena Chepchirchir (born 1 December 1981) is a Kenyan professional long-distance runner who competes in half marathon and marathon events. Chepchirchir has won half marathons in Venlo, Glasgow and Zwolle. She is a two-time winner of the BIG 25 Berlin race. She has a half marathon best of 1:08:22 hours and a marathon best of 2:23:00 hours.

== Biography ==
Chepchirchir was born in Embu, in Kenya's Eastern Province. One of her earliest wins came at the Cursa de Bombers in 2002, where she won the 10K race in a time of 33:10 minutes. She won the 10K section of the Lidingöloppet cross country race a year later. Chepchirchir began to establish herself in Europe around 2006. That year she came fourth at the Glasgow Half Marathon with a time of 1:11:30 hours, won the Maastrichts Mooiste 15K and came first in the half marathon section of the Drenthe Marathon. In 2007, she came second at the Hamburg 10K, won the Utrecht Half Marathon in a personal best of 1:10:44 hours and set a 25K best of 1:25:38 hours to win the BIG 25 Berlin. Later that season she came fourth at the Dam tot Damloop 10-miler.

Chepchirchir won both the Venloop and Zwolle Half Marathons in 2008. She also bettered her 25K time to 1:24:55 hours at the Berlin 25K, but was beaten into second place by Peninah Arusei. Elsewhere on the European circuit she won the Zwitserloot Dak Run 10K. She was absent for the 2009 and 2010 seasons, but returned to competition in 2011 with a new focus on the longer marathon event.

She joined Volare Sports, a Dutch running club, in 2011 and opened the year with a third place finish at the Egmond Half Marathon. She dipped under one hour and ten minutes at the CPC Loop Den Haag, winning the race in a personal best of 1:09:06 hours despite cold temperatures. She came third at the Rabat Half Marathon in April, then won her second title at the Berlin 25K a month later, improving her time to 1:23:22 hours. A personal best of 1:08:22 hours came as part of her second career victory at the Zwolle Half Marathon and her time ranked her twelfth in the world that year. Later in the autumn European road season, she was third at the Kärnten Läuft and won the Great Scottish Run in Glasgow. Chepchirchir also set a new 10K best at the Appingedam Stadsloop, finishing as runner-up in 32:13 minutes behind Joyce Chepkirui. All these performances built up to her marathon debut at the 2011 Frankfurt Marathon and she performed well on her first attempt by taking third place on the podium with a time of 2:24:21 hours.

In her second marathon outing at the 2012 Prague International Marathon she moved one position up the podium to finish as runner-up to Agnes Kiprop. She ran a personal best of 1:08:06 to win the Lille Half Marathon, then came fourth at the 2012 Berlin Marathon. At the start of 2013 she was narrowly beaten at the Egmond Half Marathon by Helah Kiprop. She outran Ethiopian competition at the Seoul International Marathon in March to win the race in 2:25:43 hours. A new best of 2:23:00 hours came at the Frankfurt Marathon in October, where she was runner-up behind Caroline Kilel.
