= Derby 10k =

Road running event in Derby, UK

- Date: 24 March 2024
- Location: Derby, United Kingdom
- Event type: road
- Distance: 10K run
- Established: 2002
- Website: www.derby10k.co.uk

The Derby 10k is an annual 10 kilometre road running event held in Derby, UK, in April, organised by the Derby County Community Trust.

Over 3,000 runners take part in the race, which starts outside Pride Park Stadium, the home of Derby County F.C.

The course then loops around the Pride Park estate before heading over the Station Approach flyover and into Derby City Centre.

It continues through the city centre along St Peter's Street and Irongate and then heads out along Full St, Derwent St, Darwin Place, Eastgate and Chequers Rd before returning to the finish at Pride Park Stadium.

In 2012, a 3k Wheelchair race was held for the first time with the race won by local athlete Phil Hogg. A full 10k wheelchair race was held in 2014, which was again won by Phil Hogg.

The 2020 race was cancelled due to the COVID-19 outbreak. The 2021 event was switched to the autumn with the race held on 17 October 2021.

== Winners ==
Key: Course record

Year	Men's winner	Time (m:s)	Women's winner	Time (m:s)
2002	Kevin Farrow (Derby)	31:41	Liz Lilley (Mansfield)	36:27
2003	Kevin Farrow (Derby)	30:49	Lisa Palmer (Derby)	37:17
2004	Andrew Morgan-Lee (Salford)	30:44	Claire Woolis (Sutton-in-Ashfield)	35:06
2005	Richard Kay (Notts AC)	30:43	Lisa Palmer (Derby)	36.33
2006	Andrew Norman (Altrincham)	30:41	Jennifer MacLean (Edinburgh)	36:17
2007	Alex Pilcher (Derby)	31:00	Andrea Woodvine (Aldershot)	35:23
2008	Martin Whitehouse (Notts AC)	31:27	Beth Eburne (Hinckley)	36:09
2009	Neil Renault (Long Eaton)	31:08	Jennifer MacLean (Edinburgh)	35:25
2010	Alex Pilcher (Derby)	30:39	Sarah Harris (Long Eaton)	35:18
2011	Alex Pilcher (Derby)	30:36	Sarah Harris (Long Eaton)	35:45
2012	Russell Bentley (Blackheath and Bromley)	30:14	Sarah Harris (Long Eaton)	36:14
2013	Richard Weir (Derby)	30:41	Calli Thackery (Hallamshire Harriers)	35:46
2014	Richard Weir (Derby)	31:17	Juliet Potter (Charnwood)	34:52
2015	Richard Weir (Derby)	30:35	Louise Inslay (Heanor)	37.11
2016	Ben Connor (Derby)	28:59	Lisa Palmer-Blount (Heanor)	36:04
2017	Joe Rainsford (Heanor)	31:23	Veleska Wills (Derby)	36.01
2018	Richard Weir (Derby)	31:06	Kate Avery (Shildon)	34:38
2019	Alex Pilcher (Derby)	31:32	Lisa Palmer-Blount (Derby)	36:29
2020	Race not held due to COVID-19			
2021	Samuel Moakes (Sutton-in-Ashfield)	30:51	Rebecca Miller (Derby)	40:30
2022	Samuel Moakes (Sutton-in-Ashfield)	31:07	Lily Partridge (Birchfield)	34:24
2023	David Bishop (Derby)	31:20	Laura Bailey (Unattached)	37:06
2024	David Bishop (Derby)	31:18	Laura Bailey (Unattached)	37:30

WHEELCHAIR RACE

Key: Course record

Year	Men's winner	Time (m:s)	Women's winner	Time (m:s)
2014	Phil Hogg (Derby)	27:33	Jade Jones (New Marsk)	27:57
2018	No male athletes	N/A	Helen Gilham	52:37
