= Kassel Marathon =

Annual marathon in Kassel, Germany

- Date: September
- Location: Kassel, Germany
- Event type: Road
- Distance: Marathon, Half marathon
- Primary sponsor: EAM
- Established: 2007
- Course records: Men's: 2:12:37 (2019) (Kenya) Edwin Kosgei; Women's: 2:35:23 (2012) (Kenya) Salome Biwott
- Website: Kassel Marathon
- Participants: 340 (2019); 367 (2018)

The Kassel Marathon (official name until 2016: E.ON Kassel Marathon, as of 2017: EAM Kassel Marathon) is a marathon which has taken place every year in Kassel since its inception in 2007. It is the third fastest marathon in Germany and split over 3 days. Power walkers, handbikers, and a children's marathon (4.2195 km), the second largest in Germany, are also part of the marathon weekend, which is organised by PSV Grün-Weiß Kassel and AS-Event GmbH by Winfried Aufenanger, until 2001 twenty years long honorary trainer from the marathon runner of the German Athletics Association (DLV).

The Kassel Marathon is and was the venue of Deutschen Halbmarathonmeisterschaften Inlineskating, Deutsche Kirchenmeisterschaft, Deutsche Studentenmeisterschaft, Hessische VHS-Meisterschaft, Polizei-Cup, and Raiffeisen Azubi-Cup. Furthermore, there is combined assessment with the Paderborner Osterlauf (oldest road run in Germany), called PaKa-Cup.

== Course ==
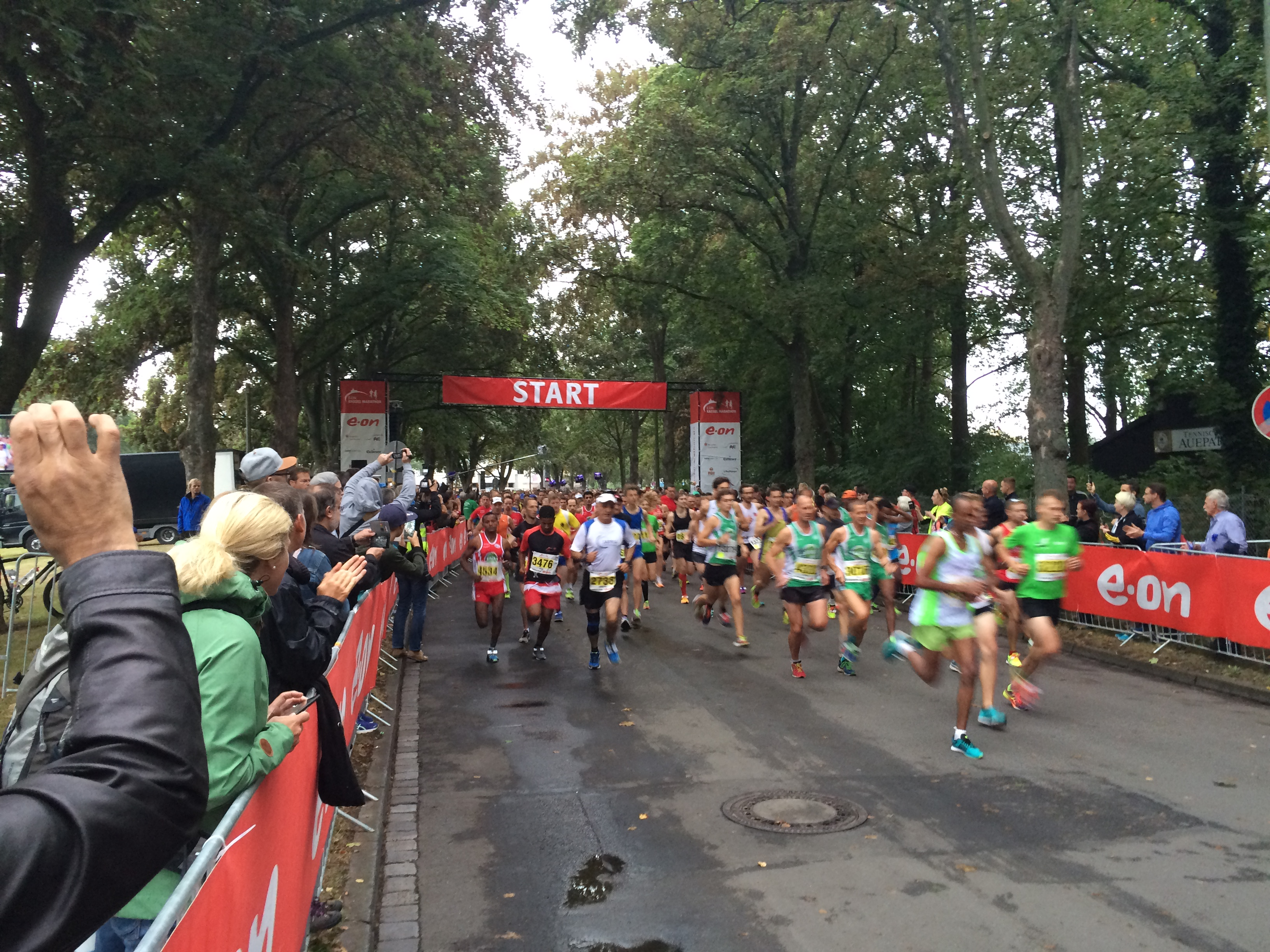
Start of half marathon 2016

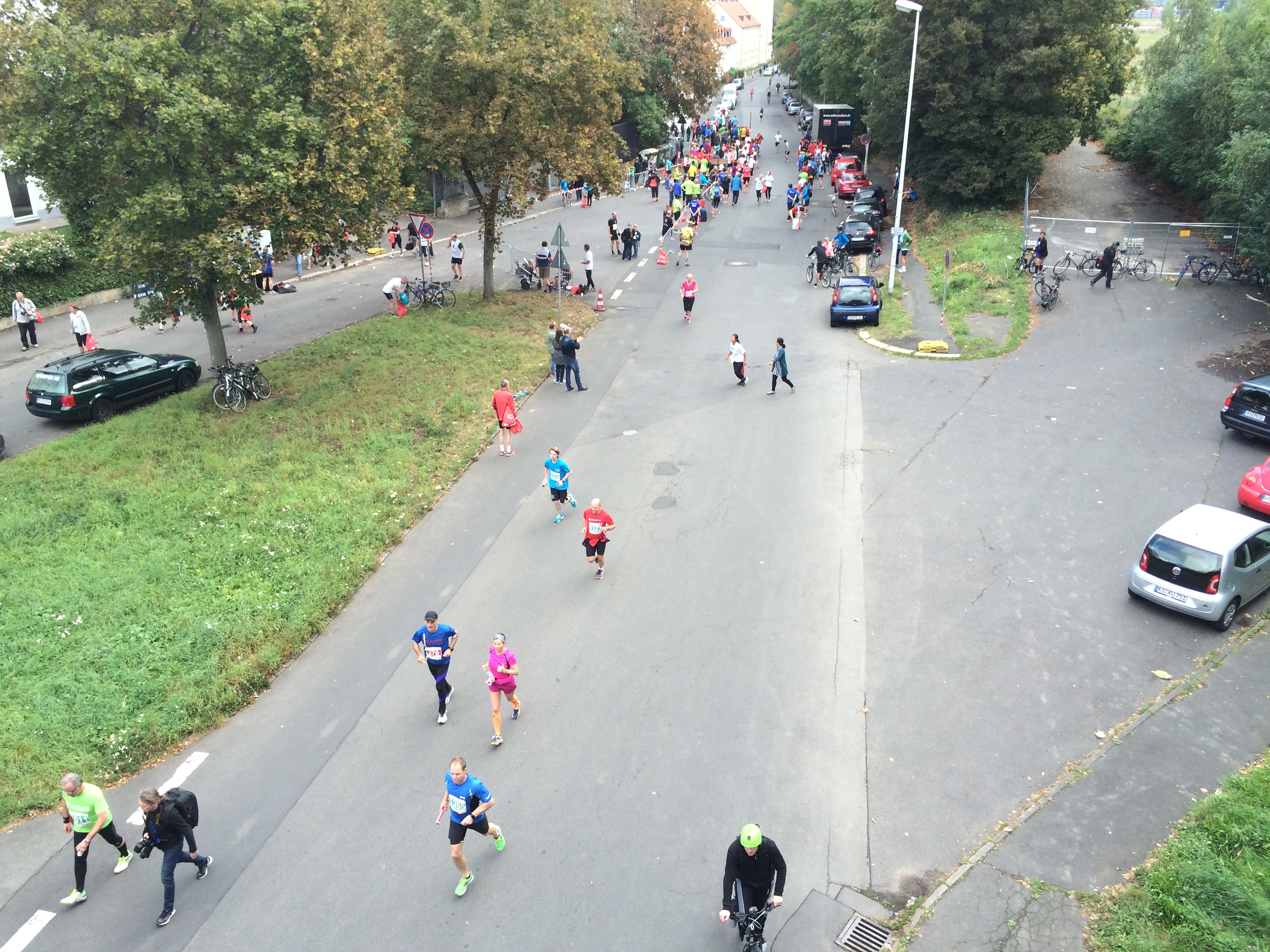
Staffelwechselpunkt in Mombachstreet and course 2016

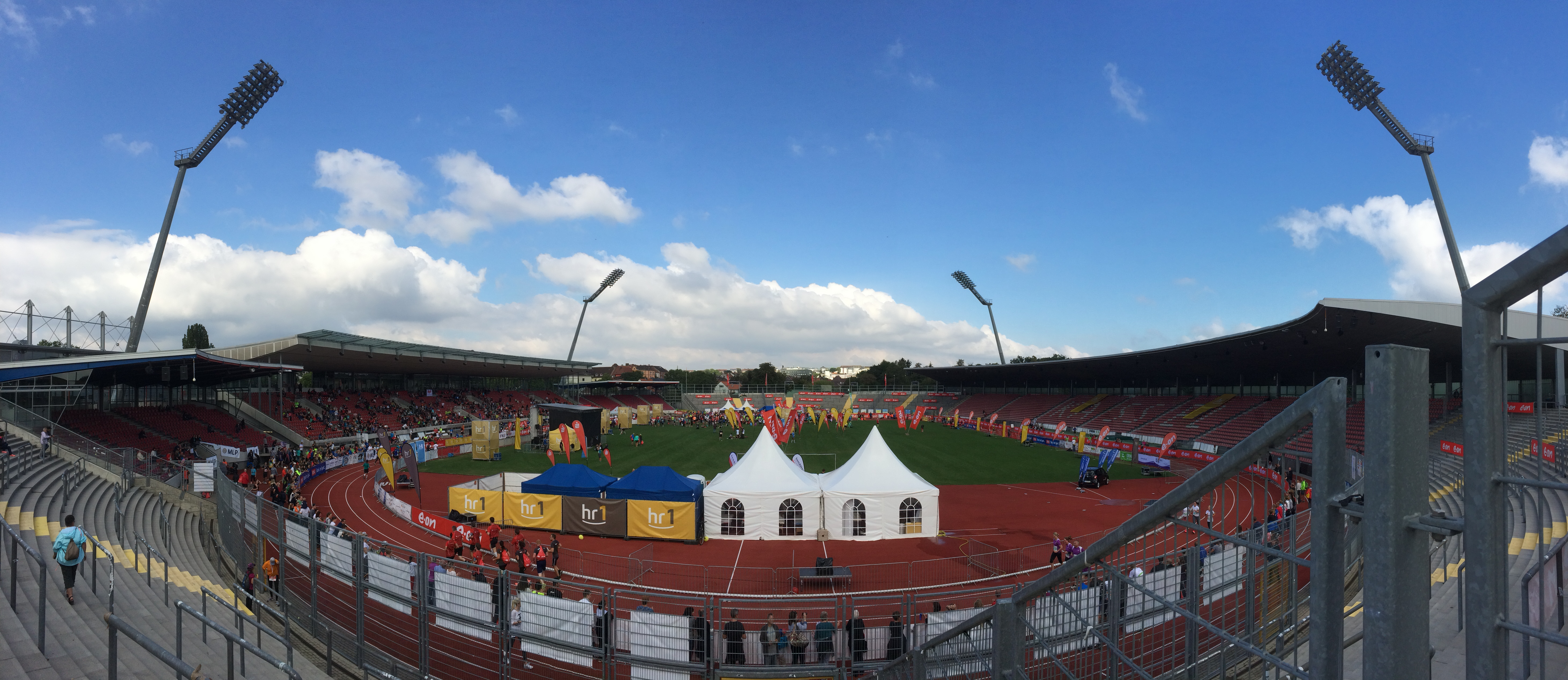
Finish in Auestadion 2016

The course starts near Auestadion and Eissporthalle Kassel and finishes in the Auestadion. The mini-marathon leads through the Karlsaue, half marathon and marathon cross the Fulda (river) two times and pass Waldau, Forstfeld, Bettenhausen, Wesertor, Wolfsanger (only marathon), Nord (Holland), Rothenditmold, Kirchditmold, Vorderer Westen, and Südstadt. A lot of people think that the course has many altitude difference, but in reality it is quite flat. For example, the course of famous Frankfurt Marathon has more altitude difference. This is the reason why the course of the Kassel Marathon is pretty fast.

== List of winners ==
Key: Course record

| Edition | Year | Men's winner | Time (h:m:s) | Women's winner | Time (h:m:s) |
|---|---|---|---|---|---|
| 14th | 2022 | Patrick Ereng (KEN) | 2:19:50 | Mercy Tuitoek (KEN) | 2:37:36 |
| 13th | 2019 | Edwin Kosgei (KEN) | 2:12:37 | Brendah Kebeya (KEN) | 2:38:21 |
| 12th | 2018 | Edwin Kosgei (KEN) | 2:12:52 | Brendah Kebeya (KEN) | 2:36:44 |
| 11th | 2017 | Maciek Miereczko (GER) | 2:27:39 | Daisy Langat (KEN) | 2:39:30 |
| 10th | 2016 | Edwin Kosgei (KEN) | 2:15:46 | Sintayehu Kibebo (ETH) | 2:42:14 |
| 9th | 2015 | Kiprotich Kirui (KEN) | 2:14:13 | Simret Restle (GER) | 2:37:49 |
| 8th | 2014 | Kiprotich Kirui (KEN) | 2:14:10 | Caroline Kwambai (KEN) | 2:43:59 |
| 7th | 2013 | Hosea Tuei (KEN) | 2:15:21 | Zefre Worku (ETH) | 2:38:40 |
| 6th | 2012 | Joseph Daudi (TAN) | 2:14:47 | Salome Biwott (KEN) | 2:35:23 |
| 5th | 2011 | Julius Muriuki (KEN) | 2:13:00 | Jacquline Nyetipei (KEN) | 2:40:01 |
| 4th | 2010 | Joel Chepkopol (KEN) | 2:12:55 | Ecler Loywapet (KEN) | 2:38:53 |
| 3rd | 2009 | Joseph Biwott (KEN) | 2:13:11 | Ecler Loywapet (KEN) | 2:37:36 |
| 2nd | 2008 | Pharis Kimani (KEN) | 2:15:36 | Beatrice Omwanza (KEN) | 2:40:24 |
| 1st | 2007 | Francis Kiprop (KEN) | 2:16:50 | Beatrice Omwanza (KEN) | 2:42:21 |
