= Wilson Onsare =

Kenyan long-distance runner

Wilson Onsare Ombui (born 15 June 1976) is a Kenyan former long-distance runner who competed in half marathon and marathon races.

His time of 2:06:47 hours at the 2003 Paris Marathon made his fastest ever debut run at the time, but he never bettered the mark. His other marathon highlights included a runner-up performance at the 2005 Boston Marathon and a third-place finish at the Lake Biwa Marathon in Japan.

His best time for the half marathon was 1:00:52 hours, and he had victories over that distance at the Paris Half Marathon, America's Finest City Half Marathon, and Reims Half Marathon.

== Career ==
Wilson began his major race career in 2000 with a series of half marathons in France. He was third at Le Lion Half Marathon, improved to second place at the Auray-Vannes Half Marathon, then claimed his first victories over the distance at the Reims Half Marathon and Saint Pol- Morlaix Half Marathon. He was based in the United States for 2001 and took wins at the Charleston Distance Run 15-miler and America's Finest City Half Marathon.

He returned to France for the 2002 season and remained on form, recording a new best time of 1:01:33 hours to win the Paris Half Marathon. He had three consecutive runner-up finishes that year, being the second-best runner at the Nice Half Marathon, BIG 25 Berlin and Lille Half Marathon. He ended the year with another win at the Reims Half Marathon. He set two career bests that year – a 10K best of 27:55 minutes at a race in La Courneuve and a 25K best of 1:14:51 hours in Berlin.

He stepped up to the full marathon distance in 2003 at the Paris Marathon and recorded the fastest ever time for a débutante—coming in third with a time of 2:06:47 hours. He also set his half marathon best that year, claiming the Lille Half Marathon title in a time of 1:00:52 hours. He ran two sub-2:10-hour marathons in 2004, coming third at the Lake Biwa Marathon and fourth at the Berlin Marathon, and also came fourth at that year's Bogotá Half Marathon.

Onsare was one of the front runners at the 2005 Boston Marathon as he came second, just half a minute behind the winner Hailu Negussie. He was selected to represent Kenya in the marathon at the 2005 World Championships in Athletics, but he did not manage to finish the race as he dropped out after 30 km. He also failed to match his early season form at the JoongAng Seoul Marathon in November, as he finished nearly five minutes after the winner and ended the race in fifth. He was some way off his best times in the 2006 season as he was ninth in Boston (2:13:47) and 21st at the Chicago Marathon, where he slowed in the second half of the race and crossed the line after 2:16:12 hours.

He was restricted to shorter, low level races in 2007 and his highlight was a win at the 10 km de la Cité des Papes in Avignon. He returned to the marathon distance in 2009 at the Tiberias Marathon and he was seventh with a time of 2:13:43 hours. An appearance at the 2010 Annecy Marathon—one of the lesser European marathons—showed Onsare far outside of his previous elite standard, as he came seventh with a time of 2:29:51 hours.
