= Zwolle Half Marathon =

- Date: June
- Location: Zwolle, Netherlands
- Event type: road
- Distance: Half Marathon
- Primary sponsor: Scania AB
- Established: 2001
- Course records: Men's: 1:00:24 (2019) (Kenya) William Wanjiku; Women's: 1:07:21 (2024) (Kenya) Veronica Loleo
- Website: Zwolle Half Marathon
- Participants: 85 (2019)

Zwolle Half Marathon is an annual half marathon road running event held in Zwolle, Netherlands, in June. The race was first held in 2001 and attracts both amateur and professional runners. Over 3000 people took part in the 2008 edition of the race.

Jason Mbote of Kenya is a four-time winner of the race and his partner Flomena Chepchirchir has three victories on the women's side.

The course records were both set by Kenyans in 2011: Wilson Kipsang won the men's race in 60:49 minutes while Chepchirchir won her third title in a women's best of 1:08:22 hours.

== Past winners ==
Key: Course record

Edition	Year	Men's winner	Time (h:m:s)	Women's winner	Time (h:m:s)
1st	2001	Rodgers Rop (KEN)	1:02:33	Mary Ptikany (KEN)	1:12:33
2nd	2002	Daniel Rono (KEN)	1:02:55	Caroline Kwambai (KEN)	1:10:17
3rd	2003	Simon Kiprop (KEN)	1:03:59	Emily Kimuria (KEN)	1:13:44
4th	2004	Peter Kiprotich (KEN)	1:02:31	Nadezhda Wijenberg (NED)	1:15:03
5th	2005	Jason Mbote (KEN)	1:03:31	Petra Kamínková (CZE)	1:13:46
6th	2006	Jason Mbote (KEN)	1:02:23	Beáta Rakonczai (HUN)	1:14:59
7th	2007	Jason Mbote (KEN)	1:02:52	Flomena Chepchirchir (KEN)	1:14:05
8th	2008	Ben Kimwole (KEN)	1:01:50	Flomena Chepchirchir (KEN)	1:12:40
9th	2009	Jason Mbote (KEN)	1:02:03	Etalemahu Kidane (ETH)	1:12:37
10th	2010	Joseph Kiptum (KEN)	1:01:53	Caroline Kilel (KEN)	1:10:05
11th	2011	Wilson Kipsang (KEN)	1:00:49	Flomena Chepchirchir (KEN)	1:08:22
12th	2012	Nguse Tesfaldet (ERI)	1:01:39	Helah Kiprop (KEN)	1:09:41
13th	2013	Edwin Kiptoo (KEN)	1:01:19	Agnes Mutune (KEN)	1:10:14
14th	2014	Jonathan Maiyo (KEN)	1:01:01	Helah Kiprop (KEN)	1:09:46
15th	2015	Richard Mengich (KEN)	1:01:22	Janet Rono (KEN)	1:11:10
16th	2016	Richard Mengich (KEN)	1:00:37	Helah Kiprop (KEN)	1:08:36
17th	2017	Richard Mengich (KEN)	1:01:34	Flomena Chepchirchir (KEN)	1:10:38
18th	2018	William Wanjiku (KEN)	1:01:31	Fancy Chemutai (KEN)	1:09:38
19th	2019	William Wanjiku (KEN)	1:00:24	Melat Kejeta (GER)	1:09:29
20th	2023	Isaia Kipkoech Lasoi (KEN)	1:02:17	Nigsti Haftu (ETH)	1:08:33
21st	2024	Isaia Kipkoech Lasoi (KEN)	1:00:29	Veronica Loleo (KEN)	1:07:21
