= Great Scottish Run =

UK half marathon

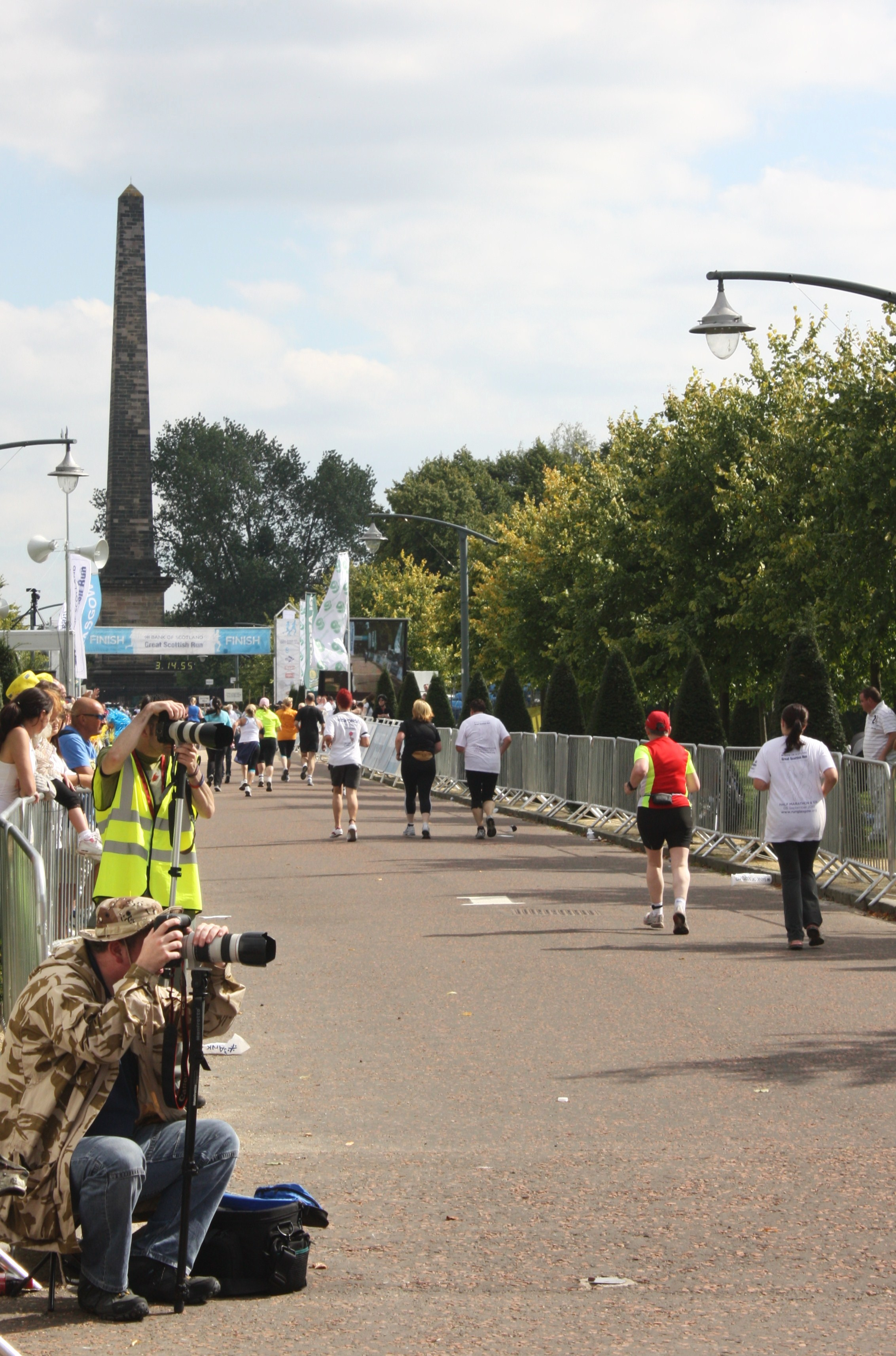
2010 Great Scottish Run finish line

The Great Scottish Run is a series of mass-participation road running events, held annually in the streets of Glasgow, Scotland, in October. The event began as a full marathon in 1979, but later changed to a weekend of shorter events. The weekend now includes short events for children, a 10K roadrace, and a half marathon. The 2013 event, which was sponsored by the Bank of Scotland, featured over 30,000 competitors. It is the largest mass-participation sporting event in Scotland.

== History ==
A Glasgow road-race began in 1979 as the Glasgow Marathon, and was run over the full marathon distance, over four loops around the centre of the city. This initial event set the challenging qualifying standard of 3 hours, which limited participation to 62 runners in the first year and 144 in the second. The third year dropped the qualifying standard and encouraged mass participation, with over 7,000 runners competing in the first Scottish People's Marathon. The race continued over this distance until 1988 when, faced with diminishing participation and little engagement from TV and sponsors, the event was run over a half-marathon course. The following year the distance changed again, this time to 15 1/2 miles (24.9 km), and for the first time the event was named the Great Scottish Run. This unusual distance proved unpopular with the elite athletes who the organisers had hoped to attract, and so two years later the race returned to the half marathon format.

After the running of the 2016 event, a number of runners raised concerns that their GPS watches reported the route was shorter than the prescribed distance. The race organisers, The Great Run Company, later confirmed that the course was 149 metres (163 yd) too short; the inaccuracy came from both a setup error in one section and errors measuring the route when roads (which are closed to traffic during the race) were in normal operation. The 2016 men's event winner, Callum Hawkins, had broken the Scottish half marathon record, but the non-regulation distance invalidates this record.

== Course ==
=== Half marathon course ===
The half marathon begins in George Square and immediately heads steeply up St. Vincent Street, going west through the city's commercial centre and Anderston. Runners then join a sliproad of the M8 motorway and cross the River Clyde on the Kingston Bridge, part of which is closed to vehicle traffic for the Sunday morning of the event. The next portion of the race takes place in the city's south side, heading through streets of the Kinning Park area, and then on paths through Bellahouston Park and heading back northeast toward Pacific Quay and the river. The course then crosses the Clyde again, this time on the Clyde Arc. From there runners head west along the river side, past the Scottish Exhibition and Conference Centre before doubling back around the Riverside Museum to head east along the Clyde, and back through Anderston, with runners entering Glasgow Green through the McLennan Arch for the finish.

The route was changed for the 2013 running – in previous races, runners stayed on the south side after Bellahouston Park, looping through Pollok Country Park and the streets of Pollokshaws and the Gorbals, and only crossing the Clyde again, on the Alexandra Bridge, just before the entrance to Glasgow Green.

=== 10K course ===
The 10K course follows the same route as the half marathon for the first 2 kilometres (1.2 mi), but instead of crossing the Kingston Bridge, runners head west through Anderston and around the Riverside Museum (a section near the end of the half marathon course). The course then crosses the Clyde on the Clyde Arc bridge, loops very briefly through Pacific Quay, and then immediately back over the Clyde Arc. From there it follows the half marathon course along the river's north bank to Glasgow Green.

As with the half marathon, the 10K course was adjusted in 2013 to include Finnieston and the SECC area. In previous runnings, the 10K crossed the Clyde on the Kingston Bridge and followed an abbreviated path from Scotland Street, through Pollokshields before crossing the Clyde on Victoria Bridge and entering Glasgow Green.

== Winners ==
=== Half marathon winners ===
==== Male ====
- 1991 – 1:04:23 - (United Kingdom) Dave Lewis
- 1992 – 1:04:03 - (Ethiopia) Turube Bedaso
- 1993 – 1:01:56 - (United Kingdom) Mark Flint
- 1994 – 1:02:53 - (Kenya) Joseph Kamau
- 1995 – 1:02:46 - (Kenya) Samson Maritim
- 1996 – 1:02:27 - (Kenya) Joseph Kibor
- 1997 – 1:01:46 - (Kenya) Joseph Kibor
- 1998 – 1:03:00 - (Mexico) Armando Quintanilla
- 1999 – 1:02:36 - (Kenya) Joseph Kibor
- 2000 – 1:02:04 - (Portugal) António Pinto
- 2001 – 1:03:23 - (South Africa) Abner Chipu
- 2002 – 1:03:15 - (Kenya) Sammy Kipruto
- 2003 – 1:01:49 - (Kenya) Peter Kiprotich
- 2004 – 1:01:48.2 - (Kenya) Peter Kiprotich
- 2005 – 1:03:02.5 - (Kenya) Jason Mbote
- 2006 – 1:01:36 - (Kenya) Jason Mbote
- 2007 – 1:02:42 - (Kenya) Isaac Wanjohi
- 2008 – 1:01:10 - (Kenya) Emmanuel Mutai
- 2009 – 1:01:19 - (Kenya) Jason Mbote
- 2010 – 1:01:53 - (Ethiopia) Hailu Mekonnen
- 2011 – 1:01:26 - (Kenya) Joseph Birech
- 2012 – 1:03:14 - (Kenya) Joseph Birech
- 2013 – 1:01:09 - (Ethiopia) Haile Gebrselassie
- 2014 – 1:01:25 - (South Africa) Stephen Mokoka
- 2015 – 1:02:18 - (Uganda) Moses Kipsiro
- 2016 – 1:00:24 - (United Kingdom) Callum Hawkins (Note: The course for the 2016 half marathon was later found to be shorter than regulation. Both Saina's and Hawkins' times, as initially reported, broke the course record.)
- 2017 – 1:02:44 - (United Kingdom) Chris Thompson
- 2018 – 1:02:07 - (United Kingdom) Chris Thompson
- 2019 – 1:01:29 - (Uganda) Timothy Toroitich

==== Female ====
- 1991 – (United Kingdom) Andrea Wallace
- 1992 – (United Kingdom) Liz McColgan
- 1993 – (Ukraine) Tatiana Pozdniakova
- 1994 – (Russia) Alevtina Naumova
- 1995 – (Russia) Firiya Sultanova
- 1996 – (Russia) Firiya Sultanova
- 1997 – (Republic of Ireland) Catherina McKiernan
- 1998 – (Russia) Firiya Sultanova
- 1999 – (Kenya) Joyce Chepchumba
- 2000 – (Kenya) Joyce Chepchumba
- 2001 – (Kenya) Joyce Chepchumba
- 2002 – (Kenya) Joyce Chepchumba
- 2003 – (Kenya) Caroline Kwambai
- 2004 – (Kenya) Beatrice Omwanza
- 2005 – (Japan) Hiroko Miyauchi
- 2006 – (Kenya) Caroline Kilel
- 2007 – (Kenya) Peninah Arusei
- 2008 – (Ethiopia) Worknesh Tola
- 2009 – (Kenya) Caroline Kilel
- 2010 – (Kenya) Caroline Kilel
- 2011 – (Kenya) Flomena Chepchirchir
- 2012 – (Ethiopia) Bezunesh Bekele
- 2013 – (United Kingdom) Susan Partridge
- 2014 – (Kenya) Edna Kiplagat
- 2015 – (Kenya) Edna Kiplagat
- 2016 – 1:07:22 – (Kenya) Betsy Saina
- 2017 – 1:10:17 – (Kenya) Flomena Cheyech Daniel
- 2018 – 1:09:15 – (Ethiopia) Mare Dibaba
- 2019 – 1:07:38 – (Kenya) Edith Chelimo

=== Wheelchair half marathon winners ===
==== Male ====
- 2005 – (United Kingdom) Kenny Herriot
- 2008 – Mark Telford
- 2011 – Ross Low
- 2012 – Phil Hogg
- 2014 – Simon Lawson

==== Female ====
- 2005 – (United Kingdom) Tanni Grey-Thompson
- 2008 – Margo Whiteford
- 2011 – Jane Egan
- 2012 – (United Kingdom) Meggan Dawson-Farrell
