= Caroline Kwambai =

Kenyan long-distance runner

Medal record

Women's athletics

Representing Kenya

IAAF World Half Marathon Championships
Gold medal – first place	2001 Bristol	Team

Caroline Chepkorir Kwambai (born 9 September 1975) is a Kenyan former long-distance runner who competed in road running competitions. Her greatest international honour was a team gold at the 2001 IAAF World Half Marathon Championships, where she finished twelfth. She also won a team gold as a junior athlete at the 1990 IAAF World Cross Country Championships. She holds a marathon personal best of 2:28:47 hours, set during her runner-up finish at the 2003 Amsterdam Marathon.

Kwambai was a frequent competitor in European road races and won several high profile half marathons, including: the Paris Half Marathon, Prague Half Marathon, Great Scottish Run and Zwolle Half Marathon. She was also the 2003 winner of the BIG 25 Berlin and Fifth Third River Bank Run races over 25 kilometres. She competed in a dozen marathons in her career. She was in the top three at the Prague International Marathon in 2006 and 2008. In 2007, she was runner-up at the Turin Marathon and third at the Singapore Marathon. Her sole marathon win was at the lower level Kassel Marathon in Germany in 2012.

== International competitions ==
Year	Competition	Venue	Position	Event	Notes
1990	World Cross Country Championships	Aix-les-Bains, France	4th	Junior race	14:23
1990	World Cross Country Championships	Aix-les-Bains, France	1st	Junior team	20 pts
1990	World Junior Championships	Plovdiv, Bulgaria	11th	1500 m	4:22.08
2001	World Half Marathon Championships	Bristol, United Kingdom	12th	Half marathon	1:10:27
2001	World Half Marathon Championships	Bristol, United Kingdom	1st	Team	3:28:04

== Circuit wins ==
- Fifth Third River Bank Run: 2008
- BIG 25 Berlin: 2003
- La Lagarina Half Marathon: 2010
- Paris Half Marathon: 2007
- Prague Half Marathon: 2006
- Cordoba Half Marathon: 2005
- Great Scottish Run: 2003
- Zwolle Half Marathon: 2002
- Gironingen Half Marathon: 2002
- Wurzburger Residenzlauf: 2003
- Zwitserloot Dak Run: 2002

== Personal bests ==
- 1500 metres – 4:22.08 min (1990)
- 5000 metres – 15:56.30 min (2003)
- 10K run – 31:28 min (2001)
- Half marathon – 69:45 min (2001)
- Marathon – 2:28:47 (2003)
