= Beatrice Omwanza =

Kenyan long-distance runner

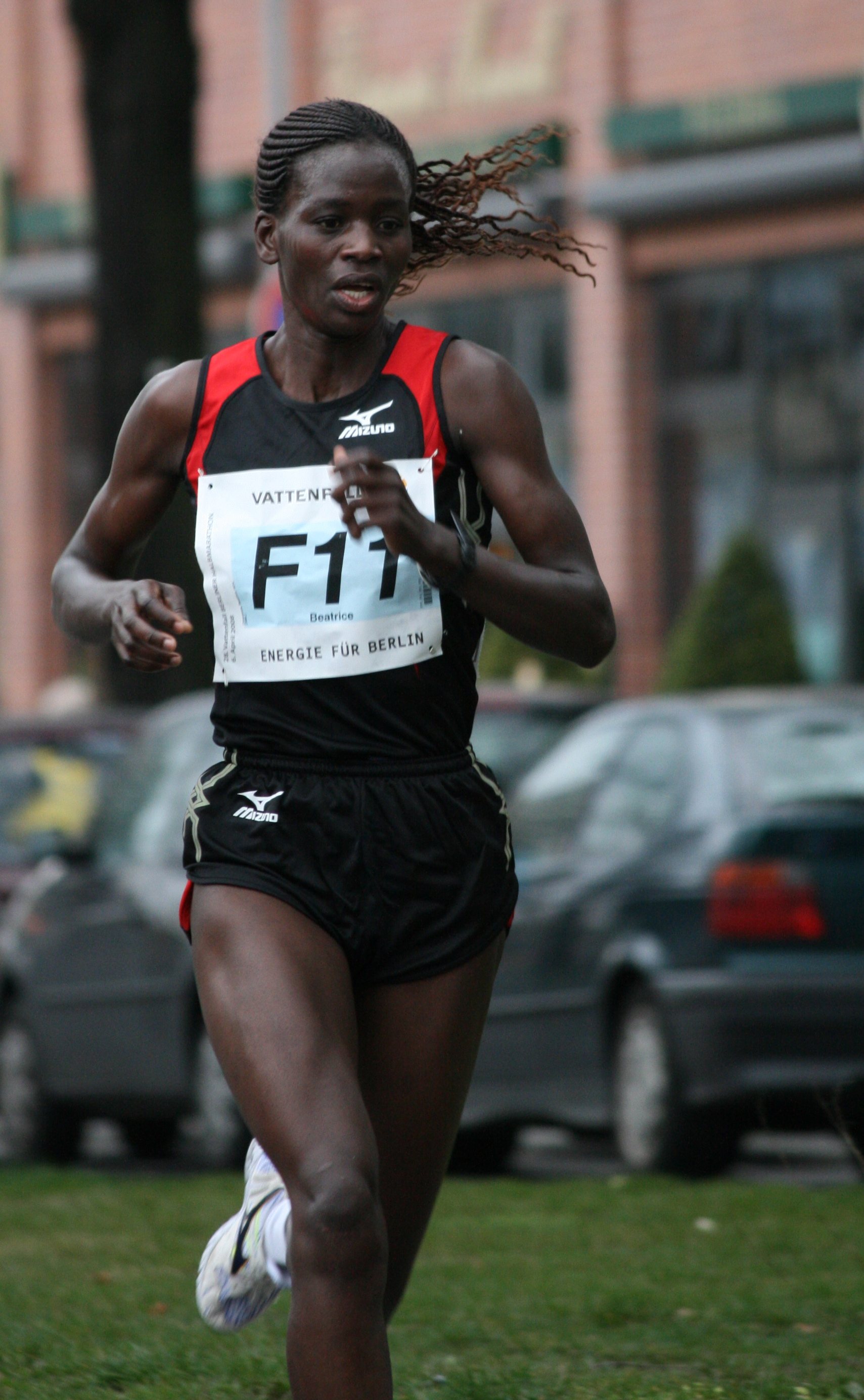
Omwanza running at the 2008 Berlin Half Marathon.

Beatrice Omwanza (born 24 February 1974) is a Kenyan long-distance runner who competes in marathon and half marathon races. She represented Kenya in the marathon at the World Championships in Athletics in 2003 and 2005. Her personal best for the event is 2:27:19 hours.

The biggest achievement of her career is a win at the Paris Marathon in 2003. She has also won the Turin Marathon and Reims Marathon. Over the half marathon distance, she has competed extensively in France and has won at the Paderborner Osterlauf, Great Scottish Run, and Bredase Singelloop.

== Career ==
In her earlier career, she was a steeplechase runner and was the Kenyan champion in the event in 1998. That same year, she ran in the short race at the 1998 IAAF World Cross Country Championships and finished sixth, helping Kenya to fourth in the rankings. However, it was on the roads in France that she established herself as a top class runne. She won the 1995 edition of the Saint Pol-Morlaix Half Marathon, ran the fastest ever half marathon in Macau in 1997, and was the 1998 winner of the Foulée Suresnoise 10K. In 2001, she won the Boulogne-Billancourt Half Marathon and also had her second victory at the Saint Pol-Morlaix. Back-to-back wins came at the Alençon-Médavy in 2001 and 2002.

Omwanza made a number of podium finishes in major races in 2002: she had runner-up placings at the Paris Half Marathon, Humarathon and Lille Half Marathon, and managed third at the Nice Half Marathon and Semi-Marathon Marvejols-Mende. She made her debut over the full marathon distance that year and came second to Lucy Karimi at the Reims Marathon, finishing the 42.195 km distance in a time of 2:35:36 hours. A year later, in only her second outing in the event, she improved her best by nearly eight minutes to win the Paris Marathon in 2:27:44 hours, defeating Rosaria Console in a sprint finish. She was selected to represent Kenya in the women's marathon at the 2003 World Championships in Athletics, but she did not manage to finish the race as she dropped out after 25 km. Omwanza went on to win the Reims Marathon in October that year, although her winning time of 2:32:02 was somewhat slower than her Paris run.

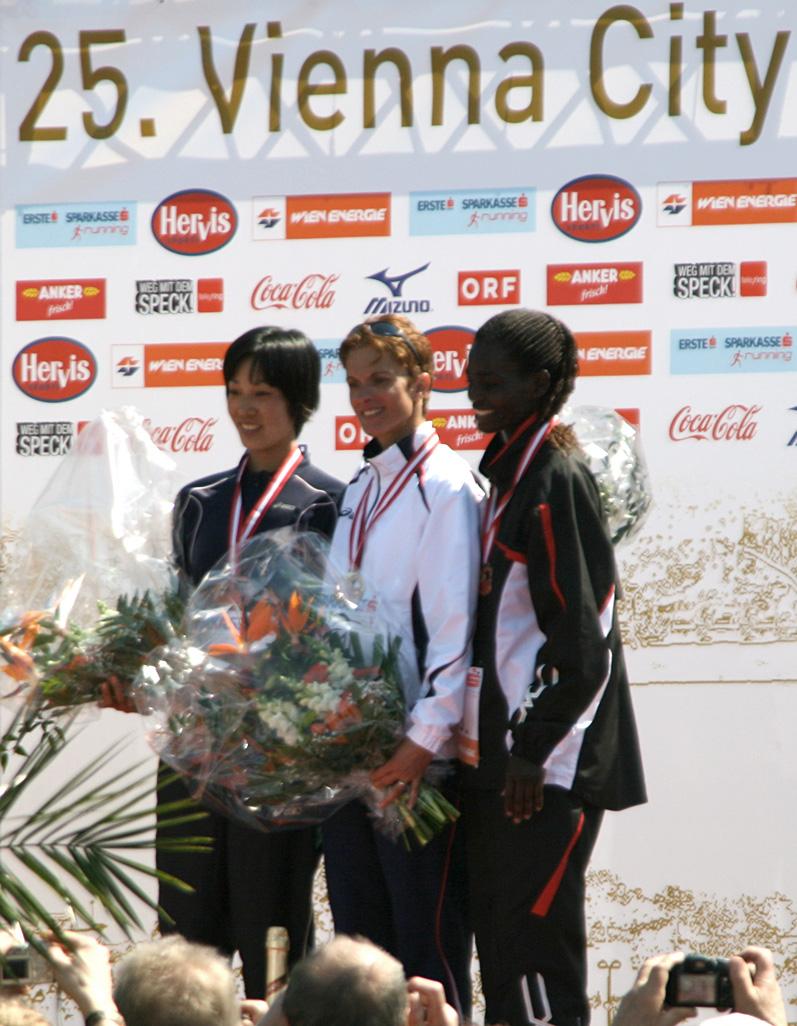
Omwanza (right) on the podium at the 2008 Vienna Marathon

The Kenyan made four appearances in the marathon in 2004. Her first race at the Los Angeles Marathon saw her off form, as she finished eighth, but she improved to take third place at the Ruhrmarathon in April. Omwanza achieved a career best time for the distance at the Berlin Marathon in September: she crossed the line in 2:27:19 hours for fourth place, although the winner Yoko Shibui was far ahead of her as she became the fifth woman under 2:20:00 hours. She ended the year with a win at the Great Scottish Run in Glasgow and a fifth place at the Nairobi Marathon.

Omwanza began her 2005 season with a win at the Paderborner Osterlauf, then a half marathon personal best of 1:11:18 hours for third at the Berlin Half Marathon. She won the third marathon of her career later that April, beating Alevtina Biktimirova and Rita Jeptoo to the women's title at the Turin Marathon. She was again selected to compete for Kenya in the marathon at the 2005 World Championships in Athletics and ended the race in 29th place. A sixth-place finish at the Tokyo Marathon brought her year to a close.

She ran two marathons in 2006, taking third place on the podium at both the Nairobi and Madrid Marathon. A season's best in the half marathon came at the Berlin race, where her time of 1:11.35 was enough for fourth. She was third at the Marrakech Marathon and second at the Paderborner competition that year. In 2007, she claimed third place at the Hamburg Marathon with a run of 2:30:46 hours and also won the Paderborner Half Marathon and Nacht von Borgholzhausen 5-mile races. Her last season of competition was 2008: she had podium finishes at the Vienna City Marathon and Marathon De La Rochelle in France. She also ran at the Berlin Half Marathon, coming sixth, and was third at the 20 van Alphen. In October, she won the Bredase Singelloop.
