= Venloop =

Dutch annual half marathon in Venlo

- Date: late March
- Location: Venlo, Netherlands
- Event type: Road
- Distance: Half marathon
- Established: 2006
- Course records: Men's: 59:44 (2016) (Kenya) Geoffrey Yegon; Women's: 1:07:49 (2018) (Kenya) Nancy Kiprop
- Website: Venloop
- Participants: 2,024 (2019); 1,796 (2018)

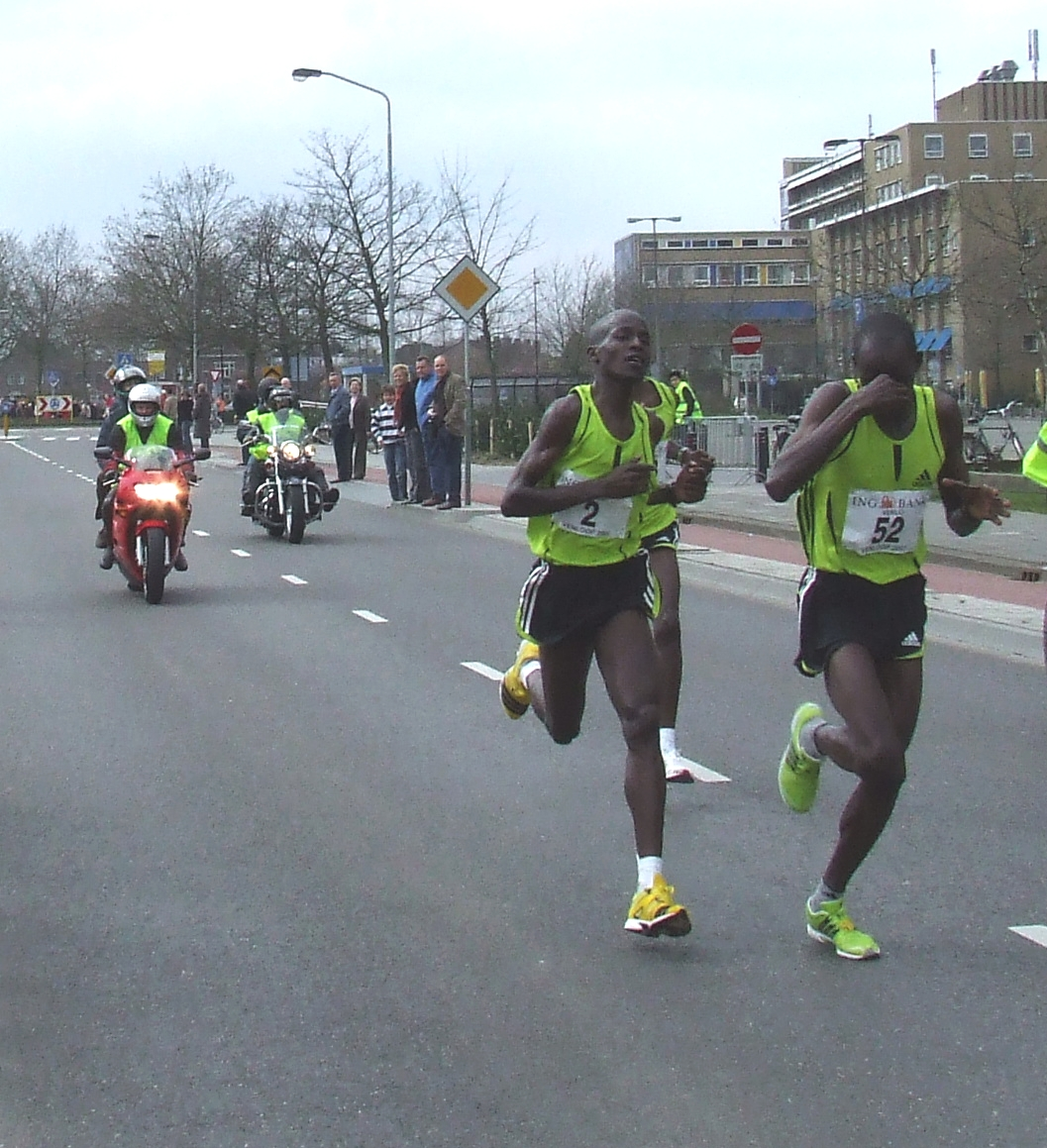
Elias Maindi (Start number 2) during his winning run in 2007 in Venlo

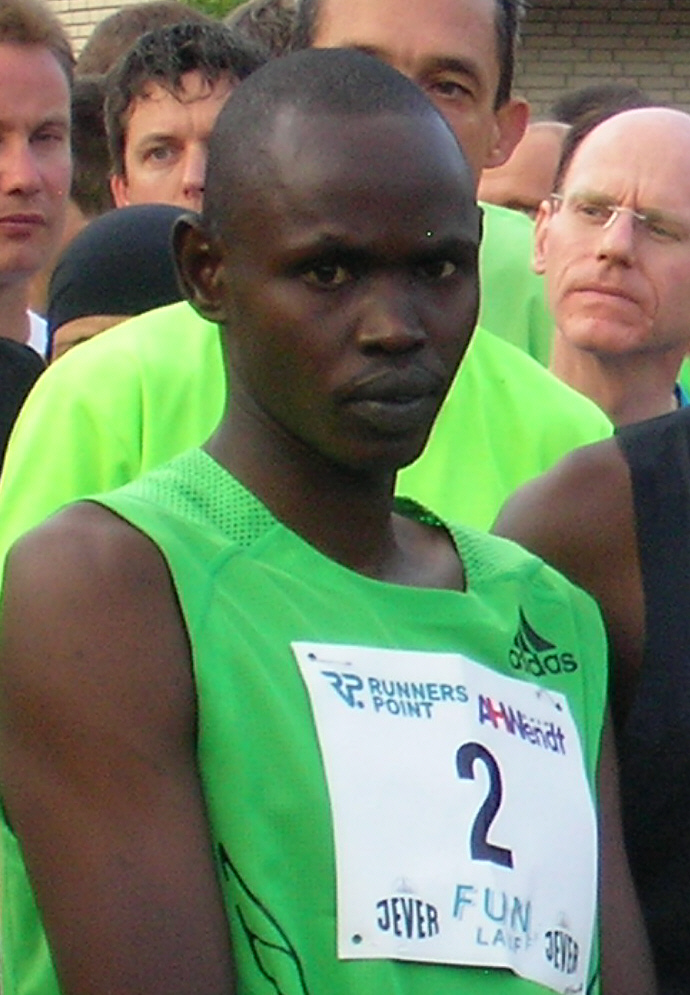
Winner in 2011, Stephen Chelimo

Venloop is an annual half marathon in the Dutch municipality of Venlo, which was established in 2006. During the event, a 10K run is also held, as well as a 5K run, a 1K run, a 0.5K run and a run for disabled and less abled men and women. In 2012 and 2013 this event had the official status for the Dutch Championship Half Marathon.

The course records are 59:44 for men, set by Kenya's Geoffrey Yegon in 2016, and 1:10:02 for women, achieved by Isabellah Andersson of Sweden in 2010.

== Past winners ==
Key: Course record National championship race

Edition	Year	Men's winner	Time (h:m:s)	Women's winner	Time (h:m:s)
15th	May 15, 2022	Erick Kiplagat Sang (KEN)	1:00:56	Vivian Melly (KEN)	1:09:27
-	2021	Cancelled		Cancelled	
—	March 29, 2020	Postponed to 2021 due to COVID-19			
14th	March 31, 2019	Robert Mwei (KEN)	1:00:21	Dorcas Kimeli (KEN)	1:08:19
13th	March 25, 2018	Stephen Kiprop (KEN)	59:44	Nancy Kiprop (KEN)	1:07:49
12th	March 26, 2017	Meshack Koech (KEN)	1:00:19	Naomi Jebet (KEN)	1:10:03
11th	2016	Geoffrey Yegon (KEN)	59:44	Perendis Lekepana (KEN)	1:10:34
10th	2015	Alfers Lagat (KEN)	1:00:33	Jane Moraa (KEN)	1:10:40
9th	2014	Nicholas Togom (KEN)	1:01:51	Elizeba Cherono (KEN)	1:10:14
8th	2013	Philemon Yator (KEN)	1:01:52	Jane Moraa (KEN)	1:10:37
7th	2012	Urige Buta (NOR)	1:02:35	Sharon Tavengwa (ZIM)	1:11:25
6th	March 27, 2011	Stephen Chelimo (KEN)	1:02:26	Elizeba Cherono (KEN)	1:11:26
5th	March 21, 2010	Abraham Rotich (KEN)	1:02:20	Isabellah Andersson (SWE)	1:10:02
4th	March 22, 2009	Stephen Chelimo (KEN)	1:01:32	Magdalene Mukunzi (KEN)	1:10:34
3rd	March 30, 2008	Boniface Biwott (KEN)	1:02:02	Flomena Chepchirchir (KEN)	1:11:24
2nd	March 25, 2007	Elias Kiptum Maindi (KEN)	1:01:53	Peninah Arusei (KEN)	1:10:49
1st	March 26, 2006	Mark Tanui (KEN)	1:02:35	Robe Guta (ETH)	1:12:53
