= Caroline Kilel =

Kenyan long-distance runner

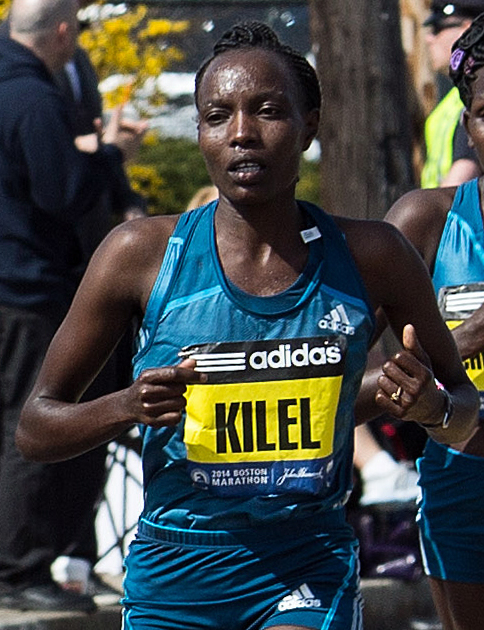
- Kilel at the 2014 Boston Marathon

Personal information
- Full name: Caroline Cheptanui Kilel
- Nationality: Kenyan
- Born: 21 March 1981 (age 45)

Sport
- Country: Kenya
- Sport: Athletics
- Event: Long-distance running
Medal record
Women's athletics
Representing Kenya
World Marathon Majors
Gold medal – first place	2011 Boston	Marathon
World Half Marathon Championships
Gold medal – first place	2009 Birmingham	Team
Commonwealth Games
Silver medal – second place	2014 Glasgow	Marathon

Caroline Cheptanui Kilel (born 21 March 1981) is a Kenyan long-distance runner who specializes in road running competitions. She was the winner at the 2011 Boston Marathon and the Frankfurt Marathon in 2010 and 2013. Kilel took the silver medal in the marathon at the 2014 Commonwealth Games.

She has also won marathons in Ljubljana, Taipei, Nairobi and Palermo. Her personal best for the distance is 2:22:34 set in Frankfurt in 2013, and her best in the half marathon is 1:08:16.

== Career ==
At the 2003 World Cross Country Championships she finished eighth in the long race, while the Kenyan team, of which Kilel was a part, won the silver medal in the team competition. After having runner-up finishes at the 2003 Venice Marathon and 2004 Prague Marathon, she won her first race over the classic distance at the Palermo City Marathon, knocking over five minutes off the former course record with her time of 2:31:15. She finished sixteenth at the 2005 IAAF World Half Marathon Championships and won the Nairobi Marathon that year. In other competitions, she won the Semi-Marathon Marvejols-Mende and came seventh at the Hamburg Marathon.

She began to focus exclusively on road events from 2006 onwards. She had top three finishes at the Dublin Marathon and Prague Marathon that year and set a half marathon personal best of 1:10:45 to win the Great Scottish Run. Her 2007 season was a low point, as she was out of the top five at both the RAK Half Marathon and the Seoul International Marathon at the start of the year and did not compete after March. She returned to action in December 2008 and was in good form; she set a personal best to win the Pune Half Marathon then ran her second fastest ever time for the marathon (2:30:44) to claim the title at the Taipei International Marathon.

In 2009, she was third at the BIG 25 Berlin race and attended the 2009 IAAF World Half Marathon Championships in Birmingham, England. She just missed out on the podium, finishing fourth, although she had managed to set a personal best of 1:08:16 as well as help Kenya to the team gold. She then went on to set a new personal best with a win at the Ljubljana Marathon a few weeks later, improving her previous mark by almost five minutes and setting a new course record in the process. She also won the Great Scottish Run in Glasgow for a second time and topped the podium at the Montferland Run 15K race.

The following year, Kilel took part in the Seoul International Marathon and clocked 2:26:58 for third place. That October she had her biggest win on the circuit, taking the women's title at the Frankfurt Marathon in a new course record and personal best of 2:23:25 hours, defeating Dire Tune by 19 seconds. She competed in numerous other events that year, including wins at the 20 kilomètres de Maroilles, Zwolle Half Marathon and Great Scottish Run.

In April 2011, Kilel won the Boston Marathon in 2:22:36 beating American Desiree Davila, who ran the fastest Boston Marathon for an American women, by two seconds. She stayed on in Boston to compete at the inaugural B.A.A. 10K, which she also won in a time of 31:58 minutes. In September she came third in a Kenyan sweep of the Portugal Half Marathon, behind Mary Keitany and Helena Kirop.

In her first race of 2012, she was runner-up to Belaynesh Oljira in a sprint finish at the Houston Half Marathon. She suffered in the hot conditions at the 2012 Boston Marathon and not only failed to defend her title, but did not finish the race. She won the Taipei Marathon for a second time that December, running the distance in 2:30:19 hours. Returning to the Houston Half Marathon, she was again runner-up to an Ethiopian, this time to Mamitu Daska.

Kilel faded badly at the 2013 Tokyo Marathon, coming 21st in 2:47:08 hours. She focused on the 10,000 metres after that, but did not gain selection for the 2013 World Championships in Athletics. She returned to the top of the podium at the Frankfurt Marathon with a new personal best of 2:22:34 hours (a two-second improvement).

== Personal bests ==
- 10,000 metres – 32:27.8h min (Nairobi 2005)
- Half marathon – 1:08:16 hrs (Birmingham 2009)
- Marathon – 2:22:34 hrs (Frankfurt 2013)
