= Janet Rono =

Kenyan long-distance runner

Janet Jelagat Rono (born 9 December 1988) is a Kenyan long-distance runner who competes in marathon races. Rono has won multiple marathons including the 2011 Hong Kong Marathon, 2013 Cologne Marathon and 2014 Ljubljana Marathon. She holds a personal best of 2:26:03 hours for the distance.

Rono began her career with a tour of Mexico. She won the 2009 Gran Maratón Pacifico, had runner-up finishes in Culiacán, Mexico City and Ciudad Juarez in 2010, then took back-to-back wins at the Panama City Marathon and Mexicali Marathon in December that year. Despite having won three marathons and having a personal best of 2:37:08 hours, she failed to get invites to major races. She decided to fund her own travel and entry to the Hong Kong Marathon in 2011 and the move paid off, as she won the race in a personal best of 2:33:42 hours and a top prize of US$34,000.

She stayed in the region and was runner-up at the Yellow River Estuary Marathon in May. She competed sparingly over the following two years, with a win at the Maratona Internacional Mauricio de Nassau in September 2012 being the only performance of note (albeit a much slower time of 2:48:59). She was runner-up at the low-key Taichung International Marathon in June 2013 but came back to prominence with a win at the Cologne Marathon. She took to the front from the start of the race and ended up improving her best by over five minutes, taking the title in 2:28:36 hours. This established her among the world's top runners and she received an invitation to the 2014 Tokyo Marathon, where she ended the race in fourth with another best of 2:26:03 hours.

Dropping down in distance, she won the BIG 25 Berlin, but managed only fifth at the Olomouc Half Marathon. She returned to the top of the podium at the Ljubljana Marathon in October 2014. She was down the order in ninth at the 2015 Prague Half Marathon and returned to the city for the Prague International Marathon, where despite a fast start she ended up fourth. A month later she had her first win at the half marathon distance at the Zwolle Half Marathon, setting a new best of 71:10 minutes.

== Personal bests ==
- 10K run – 35:37 min (2013)
- 15K run – 51:04 min (2013)
- Half marathon – 71:10 min (2015)
- 25K run – 1:24:37 hours (2014)
- Marathon – 2:26:03 hours (2014)
