= Samuel Kiplimo Kosgei =

Kenyan long-distance runner (1986–2023)

Personal information
- Born: January 20, 1986
- Died: May 26, 2023 (aged 37)

Sport
- Sport: Athletics
- Event: 10 km – marathon

Achievements and titles
- Personal best(s): 10,000 m – 28:44.13 (2006); HM – 59:36 (2009); Mar – 2:06:53 (2016)

Samuel Kiplimo Kosgei (January 20, 1986 – May 26, 2023) was a Kenyan long-distance runner who specializes in road running competitions.

One of his first international competitions was the Outer Banks Half Marathon in 2007, where he finished first in 1:02:34. The following year he ran at the 2008 World's Best 10K in Puerto Rico where he recorded a time of 28:13 for sixth place. He finished second at the Reims Marathon later that year. He returned to Puerto Rico in 2009 and improved upon his past performance, running a personal best of 27:49 for fourth place behind Wilson Kipsang.

Kosgei greatly improved his half marathon best at the Berlin Half Marathon, running 59:36 and finished just two seconds behind the winner Bernard Kipyego. Shortly after, he took part in the London 10,000 and took second place behind Mo Farah. He was given the task of pacemaker at the 2009 Berlin Marathon later that year and he led Haile Gebrselassie up to the 32 km mark. He started 2010 at the Lisbon Half Marathon but his time of 1:01:57 was only enough for ninth and some distance off the winner Zersenay Tadese, who set a world record. At the BIG 25 Berlin race in May, he established himself in elite road running by winning in a world record time for the 25K – his mark of 1:11:50 knocked almost a full minute off Paul Malakwen Kosgei's former world best. Mary Keitany also set a world record in the women's section, making it the first time that two 25K world records had been set at the same race. He won the Košice Peace Marathon in 2015.
