= Jason Mbote =

Kenyan long-distance runner

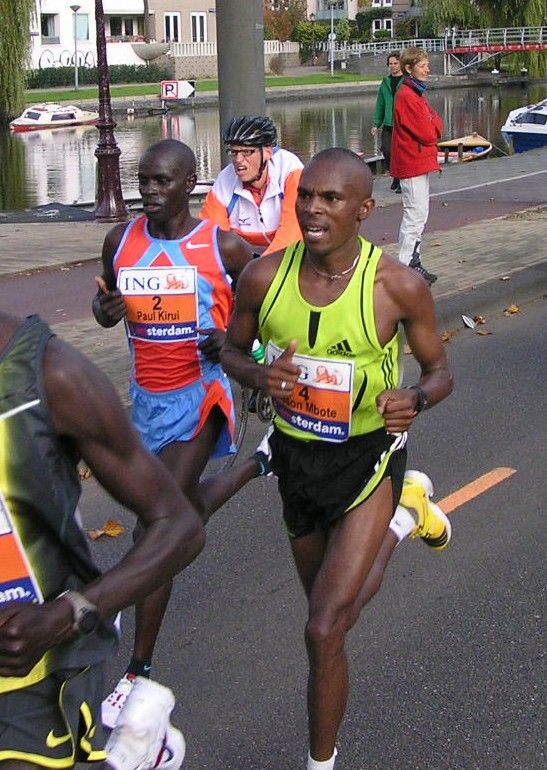
Jason Mbote

Jason Mbote (born 5 January 1977) is a Kenyan athlete who specializes in long distance, especially half marathon and marathon distances.

On 4 May 2003 Mbote won the 25 km in Berlin in a time of 1:15.07. In 2005 he was just one second behind his compatriot Robert Cheboror(1:03.36) in the Egmond Half Marathon. Later that year he won the Great Scottish Run in Glasgow (21.1 km) and was second in the Frankfurt Marathon in 2:08.30.

In 2006, Jason triumphed with a victory at the Zwolle Half Marathon in a time of 1:02.24. In 2006 he was also second in the Seoul International Marathon in March and won the JoongAng Seoul Marathon in November. In 2007 he finished fifth in the Seoul Marathon and sixth in the Amsterdam Marathon. In March 2008 he set his personal best for the marathon in Seoul with a time of 2:07:37. In 2006, 2009 and 2010 he again won the Great Scottish Run and finished second in the 2011 event in a time of 1:01:58, five seconds behind Haliu Mekonnen.
