= Helah Kiprop =

Kenyan long-distance runner (born 1985)

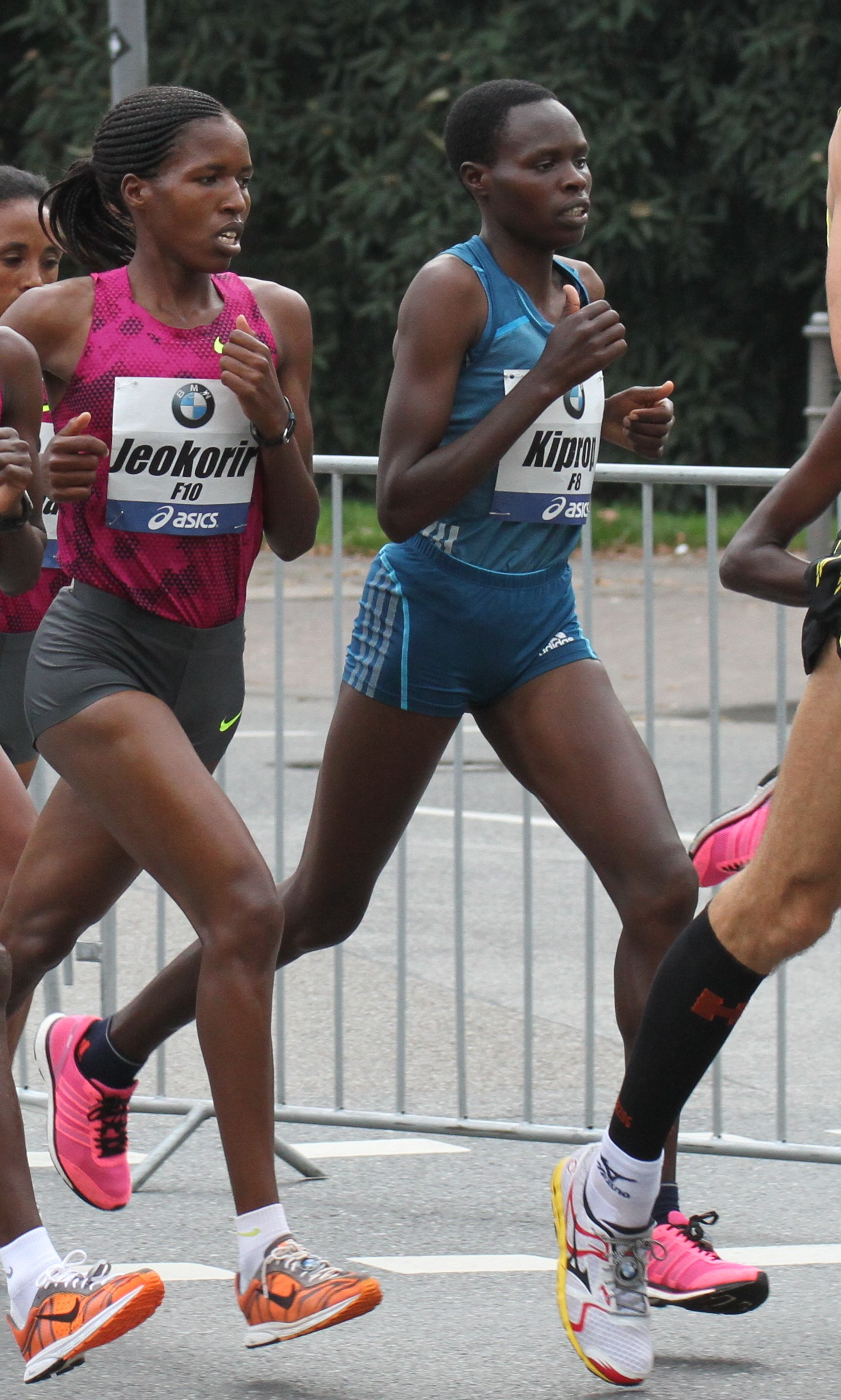
- Kiprop at the 2014 Frankfurt Marathon

Personal information
- Born: 7 April 1985 (age 41) Nyeri, Kenya
- Height: 160 cm (5 ft 3 in)
- Weight: 50 kg (110 lb)

Sport
- Sport: Athletics
- Event: 5000 m – marathon

Achievements and titles
- Personal bests: 5000 m – 15:33.90 (2007); 10,000 m – 33:03.8 (2009); 10 km – 31:19 (2013); Half marathon – 67:39 (2013); Marathon – 2:27:29 (2014)
Medal record
Representing Kenya
World Championships
Silver medal – second place	2015 Beijing	Marathon

Helah Kiprop Jelagat (born 7 April 1985) is a Kenyan professional long-distance runner who competes in the half marathon and marathon. Her personal bests for the events are 1:07:39 minutes and 2:21:27 hours, respectively.

She has won the Berlin Half Marathon, the Egmond Half Marathon and the Zwolle Half Marathon. She was the 2014 winner of the Seoul International Marathon and came fourth at the 2013 Berlin Marathon.

== Career ==
=== Early career ===
Kiprop had her first win in a European road race in Nogent-sur-Marne in 2005, running 32:55 minutes at the local 10K run. She began training with GS Valsugana Trentino, an athletics club in Trento, Italy, and made a successful half marathon debut in September 2005, taking third place at the high-profile Lille Half Marathon with a time of 74:02 minutes. She ran for the club in track races in 2006 and 2007, but did not have the same levels of performance as she did on the roads. She won the Corrida di San Geminiano 15K race in 2007. She returned to Kenya in 2008 and at the end of the year won the Tuskys Wareng Cross Country.

A series of road victories came in 2009. A personal best of 69:29 minutes to win at the Nice Half Marathon ranked her in the top forty for the event that year. She won at the Merano-Lugundo Half Marathon, the Cuneo Run and the 10K de la Provence in Marseille. She had a close battle with Meseret Mengistu at the Marseille-Cassis Classique Internationale, but ended up in second place to her Ethiopian rival. Kiprop was mainly a runner-up in 2010, starting at the Alicante Half Marathon, then the Paderborner Osterlauf, Hambaurg Alsterlauf and Singelloop Utrecht. She won the Poznan Half Marathon and the Sotokoto Safari Half Marathon, as well as setting a personal best 32:20 minutes to win a 10K in Oelde. She did not compete in 2011. She reached new heights in 2012 and was runner-up at the Berlin Half Marathon in a time of 68:26 minutes, just one second behind Philes Ongori. A win at the World Bangalore 10K followed a month after. In June she won the Zwitserloot Dak Run in a best of 31:44 minutes and was the victor at the Zwolle Half Marathon. She travelled to South America for the first time and came third at the Bogotá Half Marathon. A close third at the Delhi Half Marathon in November was her last big road race that year.

=== Marathon running ===
The 2013 season marked a career breakthrough for Kiprop as she achieved new personal bests and ran in her first major marathon race. She began the year with a win at the Egmond Half Marathon. The RAK Half Marathon proved to be a very fast race, with four women under 67 minutes – Kiprop's personal best time of 67:39 minutes for sixth place was the fastest ever recorded for such a low position. She set out to win at the Berlin Half Marathon, taking an early lead, and was first to finish in 67:54 minutes, reversing her placings with Ongori from the previous year. Her fast performances earned her an invite to the 2013 Berlin Marathon and on her debut run she recorded a time of 2:28:02 hours for the distance, ending in fourth place in the top-level competition. Her last outing that year was at the first ever Kochi Half Marathon, which she won.

Kiprop was among the leaders at the 2014 RAK Half Marathon, but fell behind the eventual winner Priscah Jeptoo and finished fourth in 68:36 minutes. At the 2014 Seoul International Marathon, Kiprop topped the podium in the classic distance for the first time. Her run of 2:27:29 hours was a personal best and enough to fend off Ashu Kasim in the final kilometres of the race.

She was coached by her husband, Ugandan David Marus.

In 2017 Kiprop competed in the marathon at the 2017 World Championships held in London, placing 7th in 2:28:19.

== Achievements ==
World Marathon Majors results timeline
World Marathon Majors	2013	2014	2015	2016	2017	2018
Tokyo Marathon	-	-	2nd	1st	-	5th
Boston Marathon	-	-	-	-	-	
London Marathon	-	-	-	-	7th	
Berlin Marathon	4th	-	-	-	-	
Chicago Marathon	-	-	-	-	-	
New York City Marathon	-	-	-	-	-	
