= Paris Half Marathon =

Annual half marathon in Paris, France

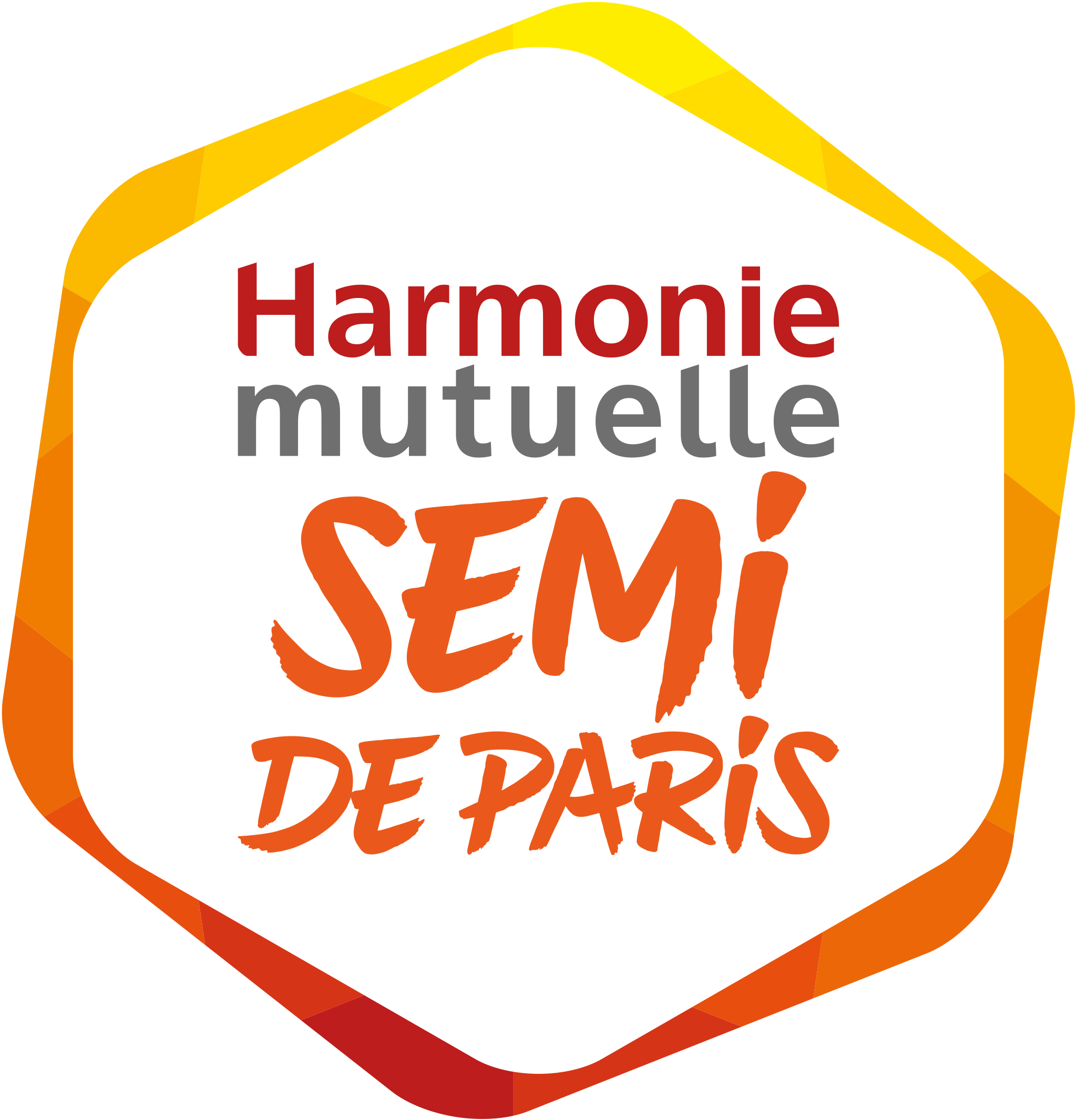
- Date: March
- Location: Paris, France
- Event type: Road
- Distance: Half marathon
- Primary sponsor: Harmonie mutuelle
- Established: 1993 (33 years ago)
- Website: Official website
- Participants: ~25,000 (2021); 34,000 (2019)

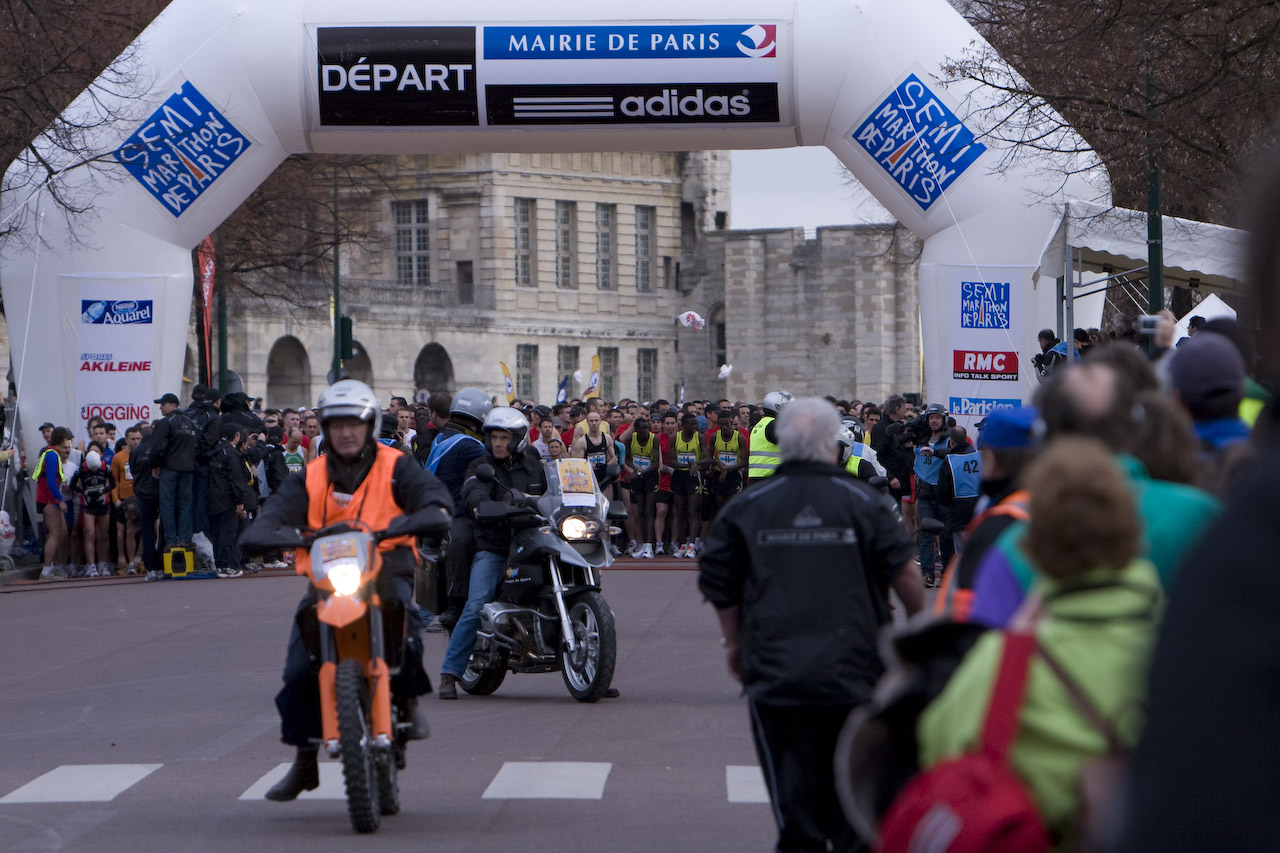
Start line at the 2008 race

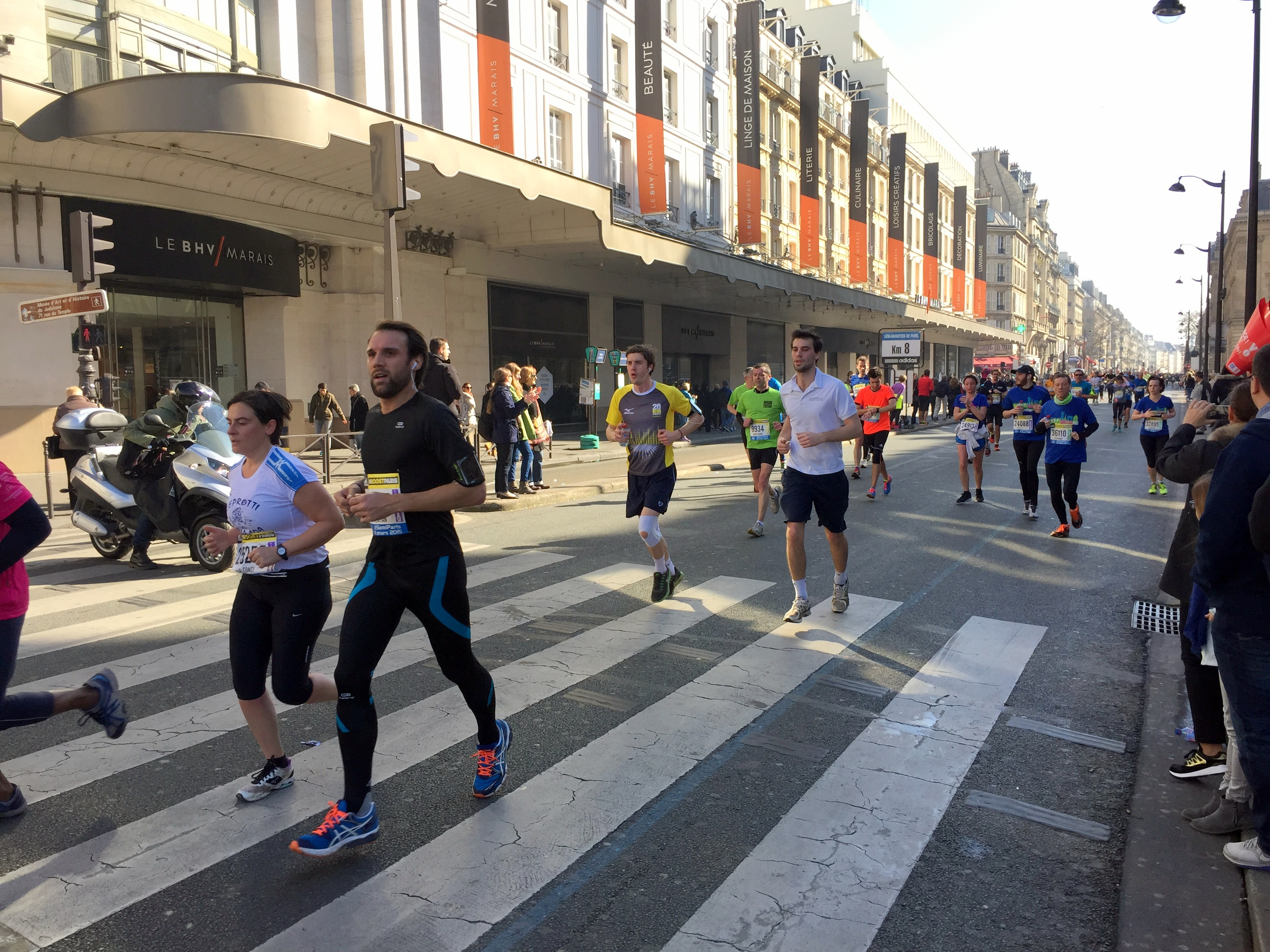
At the Km 8 marker in 2015

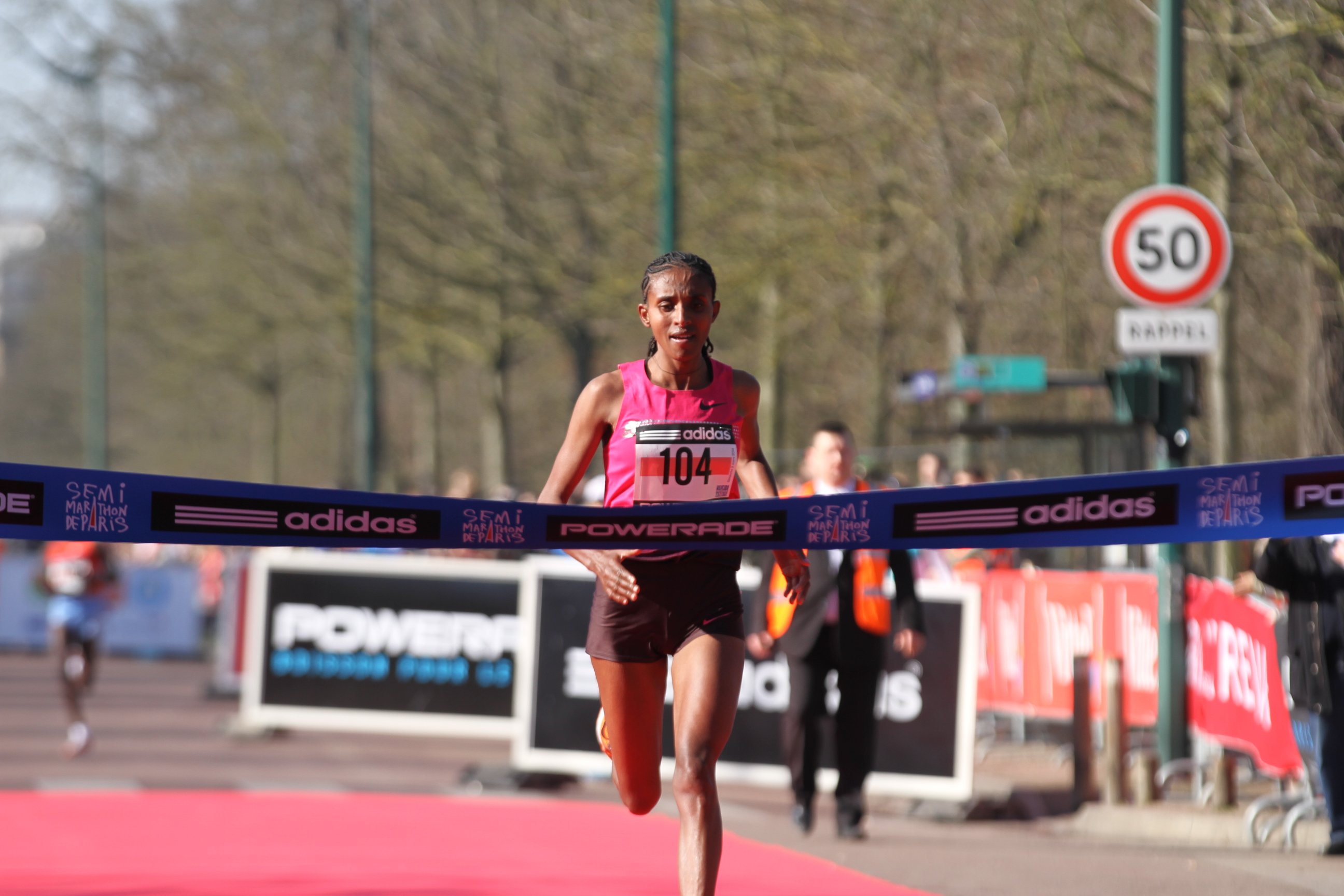
Yebrgual Melese winning in 2014

The Paris Half Marathon (French: Semi-marathon de Paris), known as the Harmonie Mutuelle Semi de Paris for sponsorship reasons, is an annual half marathon held every March in Paris, France since 1993.

Kenya's Stanley Biwott is the men's course record holder, with his winning time of 59:44 from the 2012 race. The women's course record is held by Pauline Njeri Kahenya, who ran a time of 1:07:55 in 2012. Around 30,000 runners took part in the event in 2011.

The 2020 edition of the race was cancelled due to the coronavirus pandemic, with all registrants given the option of transferring their entry to 2021, obtaining a voucher of equivalent value, or obtaining a refund after 18 months. (Note: It had initially been postponed before being cancelled.)

== Winners ==
Key: Course record

Source: "Paris Half-Marathon". Association of Road Racing Statisticians. 17 May 2019.

Year	Men's winner	Nationality	Time	Women's winner	Nationality	Time
2026	Kennedy Kimutai	Kenya	1:00:11	Ftaw Zeray	Ethiopia	1:05:12
2025	Kennedy Kimutai	Kenya	1:00:16	Jackline Cherono	Kenya	1:07:16
2024	Bernard Koech	Kenya	1:00:45	Joan Chelimo	Romania	1:06:58
2023	Roncer Konga	Kenya	59:38	Sheila Chepkirui	Kenya	1:06:01
2022	Boniface Kibiwott	Kenya	1:00:52	Nigsti Haftu	Ethiopia	1:07:37
2021	Moses Kibet	Kenya	59:42	Betty Lempus	Kenya	1:05:46
2020	cancelled due to coronavirus pandemic					
2019	Hiskel Tewelde	Eritrea	1:04:20	Nancy Kiprop	Kenya	1:09:12
2018	Evans Cheruiyot	Kenya	1:01:24	Antonina Kwambai	Kenya	1:08:07
2017	Morris Gachaga	Kenya	1:00:38	Ruth Chepng'etich	Kenya	1:08:07
2016	Cyprian Kotut	Kenya	1:01:00	Dibaba Kuma	Ethiopia	1:09:18
2015	Vincent Yator	Kenya	1:00:12	Yebrgual Melese	Ethiopia	1:09:50
2014	Mulle Wasihun	Ethiopia	1:00:08	Yebrgual Melese	Ethiopia	1:09:23
2013	Abebe Negowo	Ethiopia	1:01:33	Gladys Kipsoi	Kenya	1:09:11
2012	Stanley Biwott	Kenya	59:44	Pauline Njeri	Kenya	1:07:55
2011	Stephen Kibet	Kenya	1:01:36	Peninah Arusei	Kenya	1:08:30
2010	Wilson Kiprop	Kenya	1:01:26	Atsede Bayisa	Ethiopia	1:11:05
2009	Bazu Worku	Ethiopia	1:01:56	Jeļena Prokopčuka	Latvia	1:10:43
2008	Stephen Kibiwott	Kenya	1:01.04	Lenah Cheruiyot	Kenya	1:09.45
2007	Joseph Maregu	Kenya	1:00:22	Caroline Kwambai	Kenya	1:10:26
2006	Deriba Merga	Ethiopia	1:00:45	Rita Jeptoo	Kenya	1:09:56
2005	Dennis Ndiso	Kenya	1:02:34	Lenah Cheruiyot	Kenya	1:11:56
2004	Fred Mogaka	Kenya	1:01:14	Ruth Kutol	Kenya	1:11:13
2003	Mike Rotich	Kenya	1:01:30	Jeļena Prokopčuka	Latvia	1:09:42
2002	Wilson Onsare	Kenya	1:01:33	Jeļena Prokopčuka	Latvia	1:11:08
2001	Elijah Nyabuti	Kenya	1:02:36	Florence Barsosio	Kenya	1:11:22
2000	Zebedayo Bayo	Tanzania	1:00:50	Anne Njeri	Kenya	1:10:40
1999	Phaustin Baha Sulle	Tanzania	1:01:37	Catherina McKiernan	Ireland	1:11:48
1998	John Kipsang	Kenya	1:01:21	Tegla Loroupe	Kenya	1:10:59
1997	Paul Korir	Kenya	1:02:12	Alina Gherasim	Romania	1:09:37
1996	Andrew Masai	Kenya	1:01:16	Nadia Prasad	France	1:09:15
1995	Clement Kiprotich	Kenya	1:03.22	Adriana Barbu	Romania	1:11.51
1994	Said Ermilli	Morocco	1:01.58	Tegla Loroupe	Kenya	1:10.47
1993	Róbert Štefko	Slovakia	1:02.42	Maria Rebelo	France	1:13.02

=== Wins by country ===
Country	Men's	Women's	Total
Kenya	24	18	42
Ethiopia	4	6	10
Latvia	0	3	3
Romania	0	3	3
France	0	2	2
Tanzania	2	0	2
Eritrea	1	0	1
Ireland	0	1	1
Morocco	1	0	1
Slovakia	1	0	1

== See also ==
- 20 Kilomètres de Paris
- Paris Marathon
