= Phil Hogg =

British wheelchair athlete

Phil Hogg is a male wheelchair athlete from the United Kingdom.

== Achievements ==
Year	Competition	Venue	Position	Event	Notes
2012	Great Scottish Run	Glasgow, United Kingdom	1st	Half marathon	1:11:22
2013	Reading Half Marathon	Reading, United Kingdom	1st	Half marathon	1:12:14
