= 25 Berlin =

Road running event in Berlin, Germany

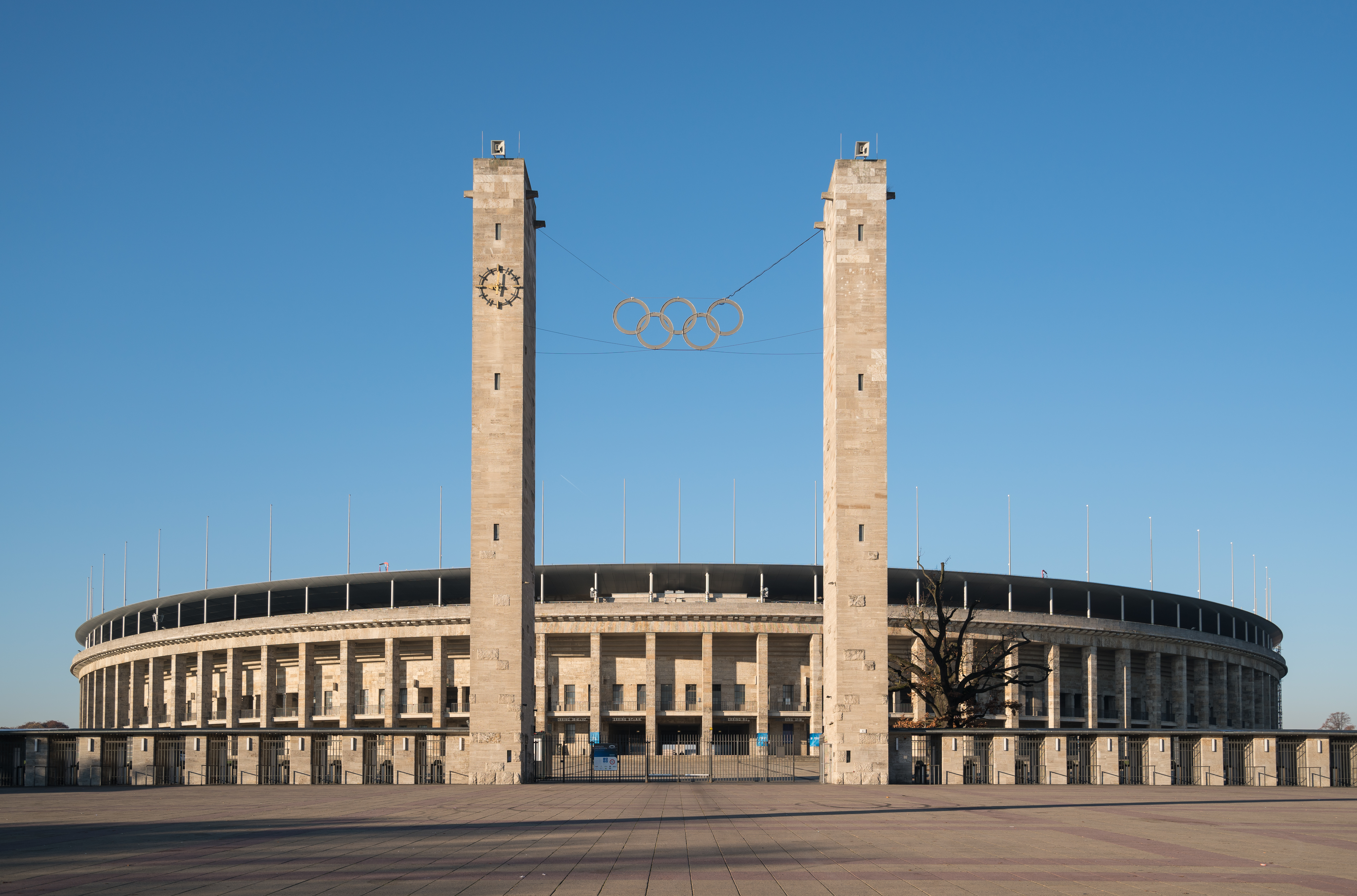
- The entrance to the Olympiastadion, which is the start and end point of the race
- Date: Early May
- Location: Berlin, Germany
- Event type: Road
- Distance: 25 km
- Primary sponsor: Berliner Sparkasse
- Established: 1981
- Course records: 1:11:18 hours (Dennis Kimetto); 1:19:53 hours (Mary Keitany)
- Website: 25 Berlin

The S 25 Berlin (German: 25 km von Berlin) is an annual road running competition over 25 kilometres that takes place in Berlin, Germany in early May.

The competition was created in 1981 by the French Forces in Berlin stationed in West Berlin and was titled the "25 km de Berlin". The soldiers were able to block the roads from traffic for the event and this allowed the race to become Berlin's first ever mass race to be held in the city centre. Under a similar agreement, the Berlin Marathon took place in the city that same year. The course for the BIG 25 Berlin runs on major streets of the city and passes some of the city's most prominent landmarks, including the Berlin Victory Column, the Brandenburg Gate, Potsdamer Platz, Friedrichstraße and Kurfürstendamm. The course begins at Olympischer Platz and the finishing line is placed on the track within the Olympic Stadium.

It is one of the most high profile annual international races to be held over the 25 km distance and has been the site of six world records for the 25 km (five by men and one by a woman). The current course records are both the current world records: Dennis Kimetto set the men's record of 1:11:18 hours in 2012, while Mary Keitany holds the women's record of 1:19:53 hours set in 2010.

In the first edition, 3250 runners started the event and ten years later this had grown to over 14,000 runners, making it the most popular road running event in Germany at that point. In the years since then, the event has expanded its programme and now includes in-line skating races and a half marathon. A total of 10,478 people took part at the 2012 edition of the event. The elite aspect of the main 25 km race has attracted top level national and foreign runners since its inception. On the women's side, past winners include marathon world record breaker Christa Vahlensieck, world road running champion Lornah Kiplagat and 1988 Olympic marathon champion Rosa Mota. Past men's winners include Olympic medalist Markus Ryffel, Boston and New York marathon winner Rodgers Rop, and marathon world record holder Patrick Makau Musyoki.

Originally organised by the Berlin Athletics Association (Berliner Leichtathletik-Verband), the organising duties were passed to Gerhard Janetzky (the Internationales Stadionfest director) and Christoph Kopp (a former association president) in 2007. The competition is colloquially known as "the French course", due to its origins, and has also been named the "Berlin Läuft 25km" and "Run Berlin".

== Past winners ==
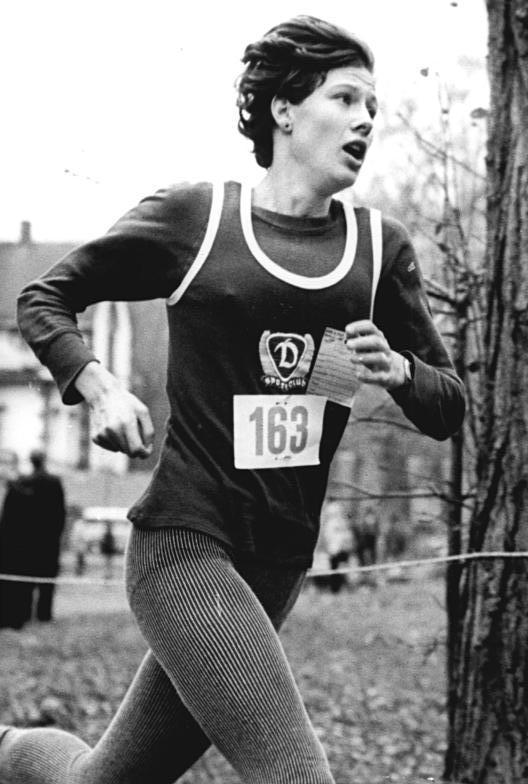
Katrin Wessel won twice in a row in 1991 to 1992.

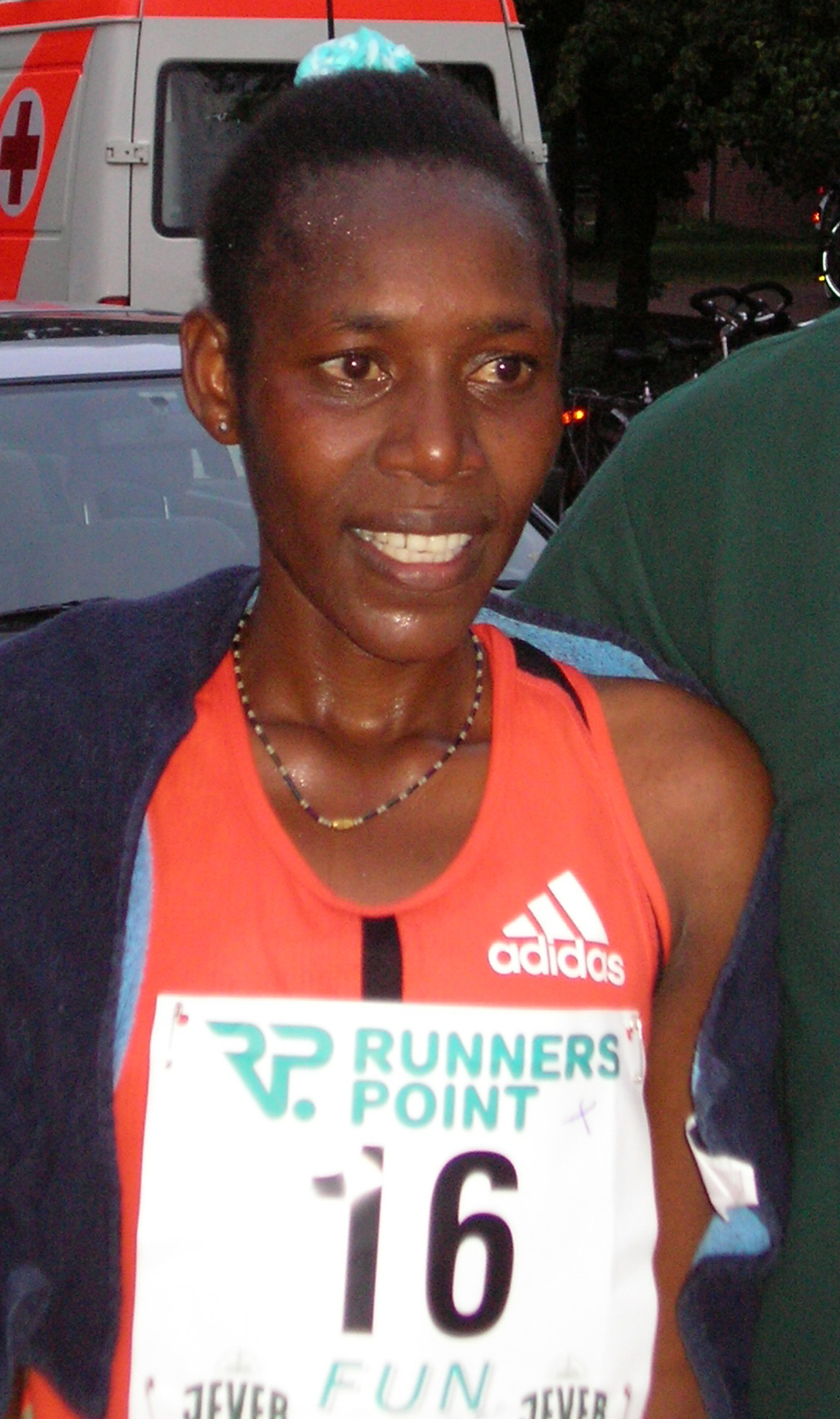
Peninah Arusei is a three-time women's race winner.

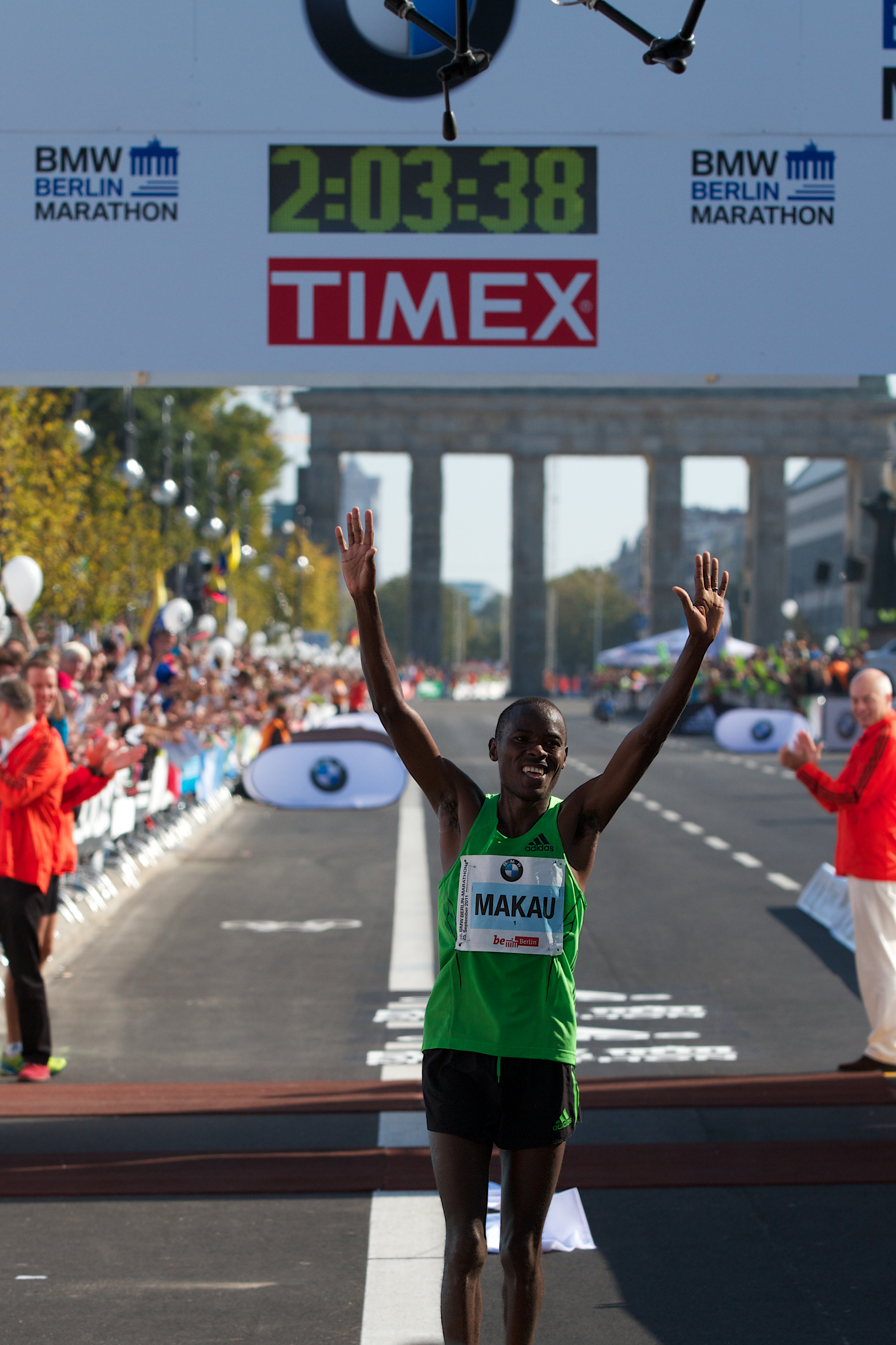
Former marathon world record holder Patrick Makau won in 2006 and 2007.

Key: Course record Course shorter than 25 km

Edition	Year	Men's winner	Time (h:m:s)	Women's winner	Time (h:m:s)
1st	1981	Mehmet Yurdadön (TUR); Mehmet Terzi (TUR)	1:16:59	Joëlle Audibert (FRA)	1:36:35
2nd	1982	Radhouane Bouster (FRA)	1:15:48	Patricia Deneuville (FRA)	1:32:33
3rd	1983	Ahmet Altun (TUR)	1:16:23	Christa Vahlensieck (FRG)	1:27:28
4th	1984	Pierre Levisse (FRA)	1:15:11	Joëlle De Brouwer (FRA)	1:24:06
5th	1985	Dominique Chauvelier (FRA)	1:16:30	Christa Vahlensieck (FRG)	1:26:44
6th	1986	Ralf Salzmann (FRG); Herbert Steffny (FRG)	1:14:33	Kerstin Pressler (FRG)	1:26:22
7th	1987	Markus Ryffel (SUI)	1:15:04	Kerstin Pressler (FRG)	1:26:18
8th	1988	Bertrand Itsweire (FRA)	1:16:11	Ludmila Melicherová (CZE)	1:27:00
9th	1989	Dave Clarke (GBR)	1:15:07	Rosa Mota (POR)	1:25:46
10th	1990	Alfredo Shahanga (TAN)	1:15:09	Márcia Narloch (BRA)	1:27:20
11th	1991	Ivan Uvizl (CZE)	1:15:28	Katrin Wessel (GER)	1:26:48
12th	1992	Rainer Wachenbrunner (GER)	1:15:21	Katrin Wessel (GER)	1:24:41
13th	1993	Tendai Chimusasa (ZIM)	1:14:25	Lyudmila Matveyeva (RUS)	1:29:04
14th	1994	Tendai Chimusasa (ZIM)	1:14:45	Alena Peterková (CZE)	1:25:46
15th	1995	Elijah Lagat (KEN)	1:16:16	Alena Peterková (CZE)	1:25:51
16th	1996	William Musyoki (KEN)	1:15:32	Nadezhda Ilyina (RUS)	1:28:25
17th	1997	Kenneth Cheruiyot (KEN)	1:13:58	Lornah Kiplagat (KEN)	1:24:39
18th	1998	Isaac Chemobo Kipkoech (KEN)	1:14:16	Lornah Kiplagat (KEN)	1:26:15
19th	1999	Samson Kandie (KEN)	1:15:40	Susan Chepkemei (KEN)	1:24:29
20th	2000	Róbert Štefko (SVK)	1:15:30	Madina Biktagirova (RUS)	1:26:01
21st	2001	Rodgers Rop (KEN)	1:13:44	Magdalena Chemjor (KEN)	1:25:11
22nd	2002	Rodgers Rop (KEN)	1:15:48	Magdalena Chemjor (KEN)	1:26:15
23rd	2003	Jason Mbote (KEN)	1:15:07	Caroline Kwambai (KEN)	1:24:50
24th	2004	Paul Malakwen Kosgei (KEN)	1:12:45	Christine Chepkonga (KEN)	1:25:34
25th	2005	Luke Kibet (KEN)	1:13:51	Rose Cheruiyot Kosgei (KEN)	1:24:46
26th	2006	Patrick Makau Musyoki (KEN)	1:14:08	Peninah Arusei (KEN)	1:26:25
27th	2007	Patrick Makau Musyoki (KEN)	1:14:22	Filomena Chepchirchir (KEN)	1:25:38
28th	2008	Samuel Karanja Karuku (KEN)	1:13:50	Peninah Arusei (KEN)	1:24:10
29th	2009	Mathew Kipchirchir Koech (KEN)	1:13:24	Peninah Arusei (KEN)	1:22:31
30th	2010	Samuel Kiplimo Kosgei (KEN)	1:11:50	Mary Keitany (KEN)	1:19:53
31st	2011	Mathew Kipkoech Kisorio (KEN)	1:12:13	Filomena Chepchirchir (KEN)	1:23:22
32nd	2012	Dennis Kipruto Kimetto (KEN)	1:11:18	Caroline Chepkwony (KEN)	1:22:56
33rd	2013	Richard Sigei (KEN)	1:13:34	Lucy Wangui Kabuu (KEN)	1:21:37
34th	2014	Abraham Cheroben (KEN)	1:11:47	Janet Rono (KEN)	1:24:37
35th	2015	Abraham Cheroben (KEN)	1:12:31	Sutume Asefa Kebede (ETH)	1:21:55
36th	2016	Benard Kiplangat Bett (KEN)	1:15:51	Viola Jelagat (KEN)	1:26:00
37th	2017	Mustapha El Ouartassy (MAR)	1:23:12	Lonah Chemtai Salpeter (ISR)	1:28:46
38th	2018	Jonas Koller (GER)	1:19:28	Alexandra Rechel (GER)	1:44:00
39th	2019	Samalya Schäfer (GER)	1:25:46	Malin Pfäffle (GER)	1:41:29
