= Peninah Arusei =

Kenyan long-distance runner (born 1979)

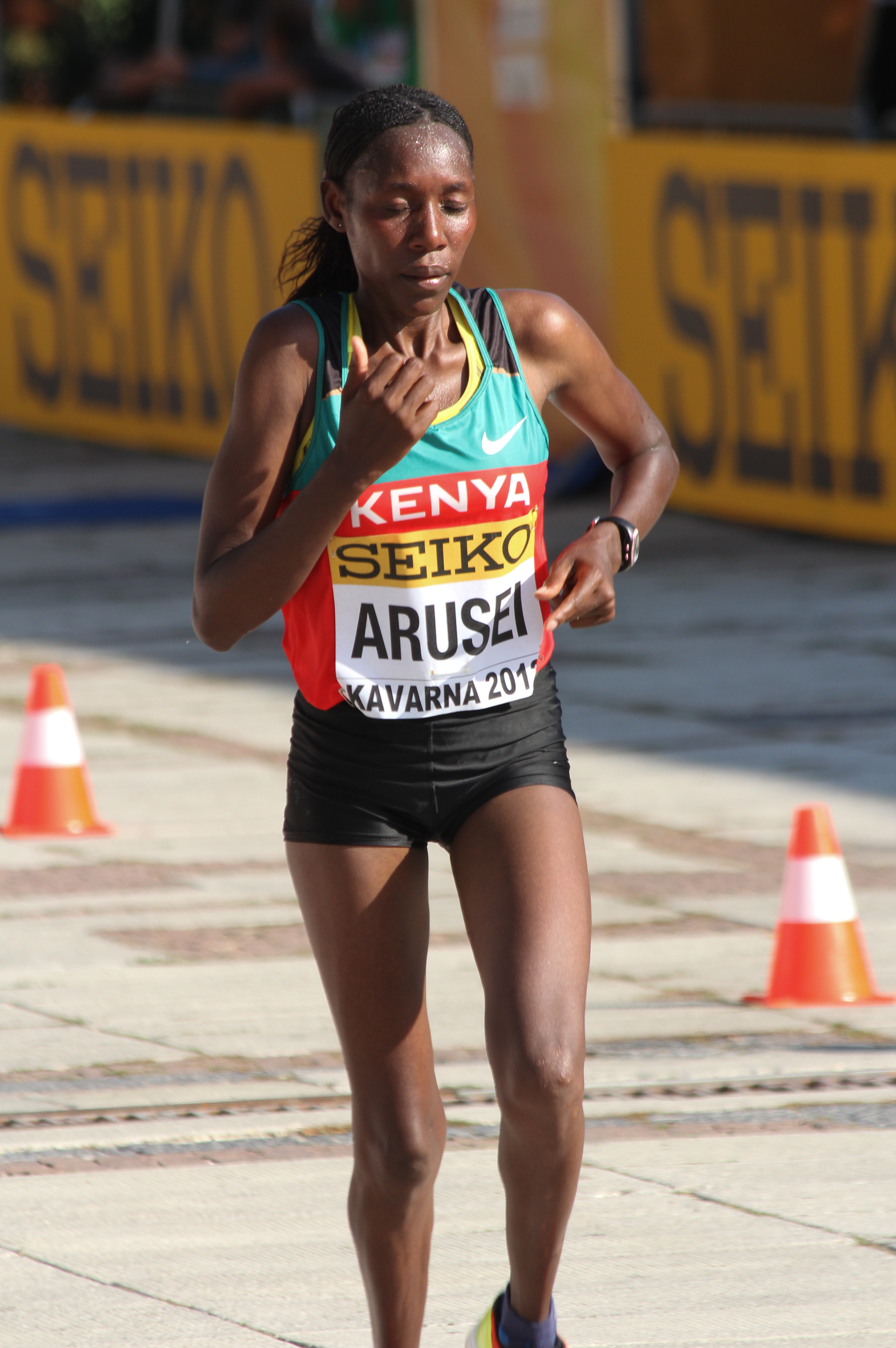
Peninah Jerop Arusei of Kenya at the 2012 World Half Marathon Championships in Kavarna, Bulgaria

Peninah Arusei Jerop (born 1 January 1979) is a Kenyan professional long-distance runner who specialises in road running competitions, especially the half marathon. She has represented Kenya at the Olympics, having competed in the 10,000 metres race at the 2008 Beijing Olympics. Arusei has won races on the European road circuit, including the Dam tot Damloop, Berlin Half Marathon and Lisbon Half Marathon.

== Career ==
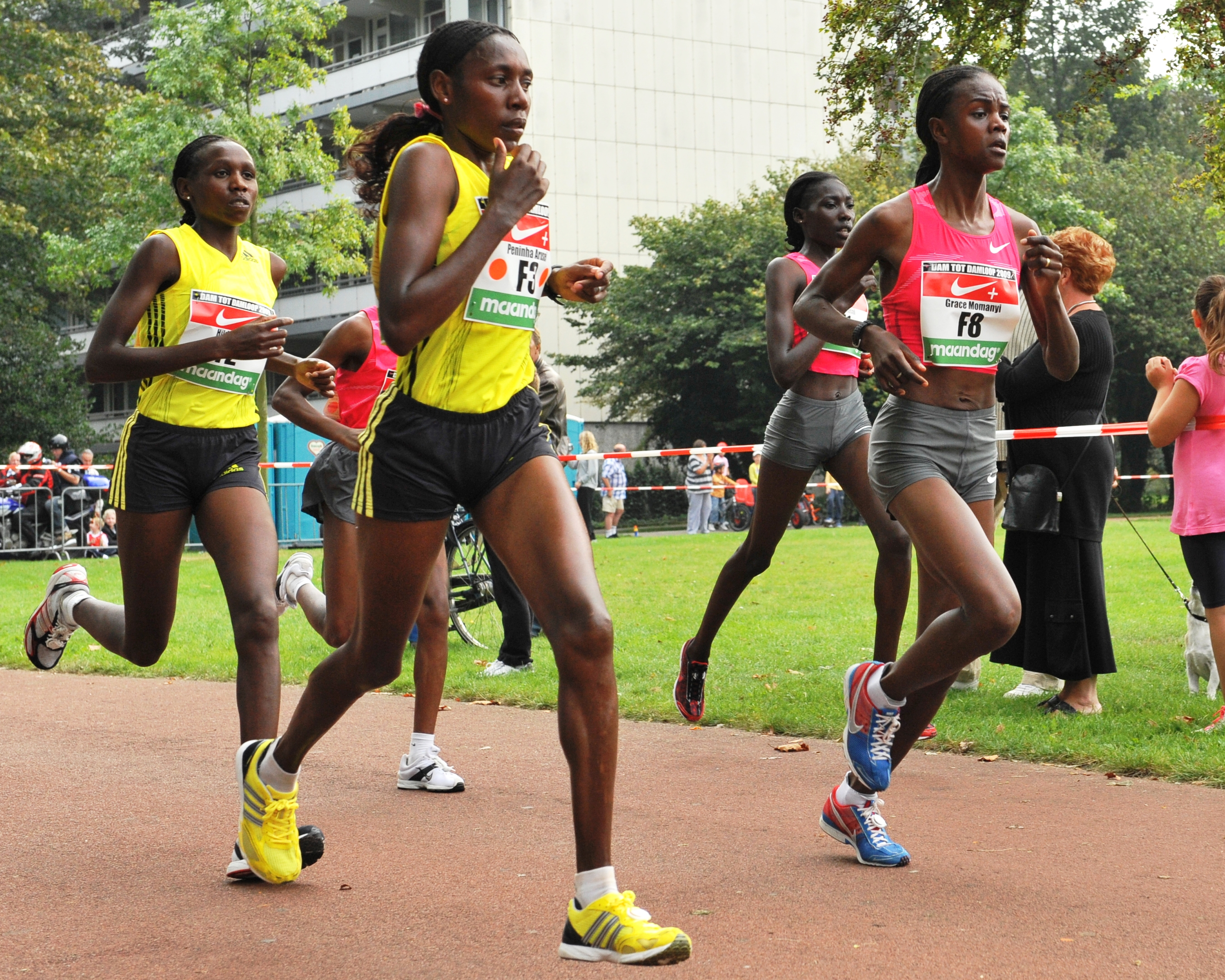
Arusei (centre left) at the 2009 Dam tot Damloop.

She won the Baringo 15 km Road Race in 2007, finishing in a time of 50:52. She represented Kenya at the 2007 Military World Games and won the 5000 metres gold medal, helping Kenyan top the athletics medal table.

She finished eighteenth in the 10,000 metres at the 2008 Olympic Games. Arusei competed at the 2008 IAAF World Half Marathon Championships finishing fifth and won silver as part of the Kenyan team. She was victorious at the Berlin Half Marathon, Berlin 25K, and the Dam tot Damloop road races that year, setting a 15 km personal best in the latter competition.

She won the 2009 Berlin 25K race setting a new course record and 25 Kilometres African record of 1:22:31 hours, erasing Catherine Ndereba's previous mark. Her African and course records did not last past the following edition, which was won in 2010 by another Kenyan, Mary Keitany, in a new world record time (1:19:53).

She began 2010 with a win at the Lisbon Half Marathon, finishing with a time of 1:08:38. She improved her personal best at the Lille Half Marathon in September, running 1:07:48, but she was beaten to the finish line by débutante Florence Kiplagat. Arusei was selected for the 2010 IAAF World Half Marathon Championships as a result and she gained the bronze medal, forming the winning Kenyan team with Kiplagat and Joyce Chepkirui. Her 2011 season stated at the Paris Half Marathon and set a course record time to win the race. Making her debut over the distance, she led at the Vienna City Marathon for the first 30 km. However, she slowed in the heat and ended up in third place with a time of 2:27:17 hours. At the Amsterdam Marathon, she was among the mid-race leaders but yet again fell behind in the second half, ending the race in sixth place.

She returned to the Lisbon Half Marathon in 2012 and finished fourth on that occasion.

== Achievements ==
Year	Competition	Venue	Position	Event	Notes
Representing Kenya
2008	Olympic Games	Beijing, China	18th	10,000 m	
2008	World Half Marathon Championships	Rio de Janeiro, Brazil	5th	Half marathon	Individual
2008	World Half Marathon Championships	Rio de Janeiro, Brazil	2nd	Half marathon	Team
2009	World Half Marathon Championships	Birmingham, United Kingdom	19th	Half marathon	Individual
2010	World Half Marathon Championships	Nanning, China	3rd	Half marathon	Individual
2010	World Half Marathon Championships	Nanning, China	1st	Half marathon	Team

=== Road running performances ===
- 2007 Venloop Venlo Half Marathon -1st
- 2007 Ulrum Half Marathon -1st
- 2007 Dalfsen Half Marathon - 1st
- 2007 Great Scottish Run (half marathon) -1st
- 2008 Paderborn 10K - 1st
- 2008 Berlin Half Marathon - 1st
- 2008 Berlin 25K -1st
- 2008 Dam tot Damloop (10-mile) -1st
- 2009 Stramilano Half Marathon - 2nd.
- 2009 Dam tot Damloop (10-mile) - 3rd
- 2010 Lisbon Half Marathon - 1st
- 2011 Paris Half Marathon - 1st

== Personal bests ==
- 5000 metres - 15:42.20 min (2007)
- 10,000 metres - 30:57.8 min (2008)
- Half marathon - 1:07:48 hrs (2010)
- Marathon - 2:27:17 (2011)
