= 2008 IAAF World Cross Country Championships – Junior men's race =

Junior men's race at the 2008 IAAF World Cross Country Championships
- Organisers: IAAF
- Edition: 36th
- Date: March 30
- Host city: Edinburgh, Scotland, United Kingdom
- Venue: Holyrood Park
- Events: 1
- Distances: 7.905 km – Junior men
- Participation: 109 athletes from 30 nations

The Junior men's race at the 2008 IAAF World Cross Country Championships was held at the Holyrood Park in Edinburgh, United Kingdom, on March 30, 2008. Reports of the event were given in The New York Times, in the Herald, and for the IAAF.

Complete results for individuals, and for teams were published.

== Race results ==
=== Junior men's race (7.905 km) ===
==== Individual ====
Rank	Athlete	Country	Time
1st place, gold medalist(s)	Ibrahim Jeilan	Ethiopia	22:38
2nd place, silver medalist(s)	Ayele Abshero	Ethiopia	22:40
3rd place, bronze medalist(s)	Lucas Kimeli Rotich	Kenya	22:42
4	Benjamin Kiplagat	Uganda	22:43
5	Titus Kipjumba Mbishei	Kenya	22:45
6	Mathew Kipkoech Kisorio	Kenya	22:51
7	Peter Kimeli Some	Kenya	22:55
8	Geofrey Kusuro	Uganda	22:56
9	Amanuel Mesel	Eritrea	23:00
10	Levy Matebo Omari	Kenya	23:03
11	Hunegnaw Mesfin	Ethiopia	23:03
12	Stephen Kiprotich	Uganda	23:09
13	Abraham Kiplimo	Uganda	23:17
14	Feyisa Liesa	Ethiopia	23:18
15	Charles Kibet Chepkurui	Kenya	23:24
16	Issak Sibhatu	Eritrea	23:25
17	Tonny Wamulwa	Zambia	23:26
18	Dejen Gebremeskel	Ethiopia	23:34
19	Tsegai Tewelde	Eritrea	23:48
20	Hirotaka Tamura	Japan	23:55
21	Yetwale Kende	Ethiopia	23:58
22	Ben Siwa	Uganda	24:01
23	Sidi-Hassan Chahdi	France	24:04
24	David Forrester	United Kingdom	24:14
25	German Fernandez	United States	24:15
26	Emil Heineking	United States	24:16
27	Youssef Nasir	Morocco	24:18
28	Sondre Nordstad Moen	Norway	24:21
29	Adil Rached	Morocco	24:22
30	Matthew Leeder	Canada	24:26
31	Ryan Gregson	Australia	24:28
32	Shun Kurihara	Japan	24:30
33	Hiroyuki Sasaki	Japan	24:31
34	Ryuji Kashiwabara	Japan	24:33
35	Kevin Williams	United States	24:34
36	Charles Bett Koech	Qatar	24:35
37	Akinobu Murasawa	Japan	24:36
38	Hasan Pak	Turkey	24:37
39	Mohamed Mekkaoui	Morocco	24:37
40	Dominic Channon	New Zealand	24:42
41	Abdelghani Aït Bahmad	Morocco	24:42
42	Abdelmadjed Touil	Algeria	24:45
43	Imad Touil	Algeria	24:46
44	Kenta Chiba	Japan	24:49
45	Houssem Rouabhi	Algeria	24:53
46	Hugo Beamish	New Zealand	24:55
47	Richard Everest	Australia	24:57
48	Craig Murphy	Ireland	25:00
49	Cihat Ulus	Turkey	25:01
50	Aleksandr Kuternin	Canada	25:02
51	Mohammed Ahmed	Canada	25:03
52	Ryan Sheridan	United States	25:03
53	Bruno Albuquerque	Portugal	25:04
54	Duer Yoa	Australia	25:05
55	Mitchell Goose	United Kingdom	25:06
56	Ross Murray	United Kingdom	25:10
57	Matthew Hughes	Canada	25:17
58	Abdellah Dacha	Morocco	25:19
59	Vedat Gönen	Turkey	25:19
60	Nyjal Majock	Canada	25:19
61	Daniel Mateo	Spain	25:19
62	José Márcio Da Silva	Brazil	25:20
63	Gilberto Lopes	Brazil	25:21
64	Simon Denissel	France	25:23
65	Mark Tolstikhin	Russia	25:26
66	Peter Corrigan	Canada	25:27
67	Dewi Griffiths	United Kingdom	25:29
68	José Manuel González	Spain	25:32
69	Ahmed El Mazoury	Italy	25:34
70	Moussa Ziani	Algeria	25:35
71	Krystian Zalewski	Poland	25:36
72	Benjamin Johnson	United States	25:37
73	Evgeny Ryzhov	Russia	25:37
74	Paulo Carvalho	Brazil	25:37
75	Michael Mulhare	Ireland	25:38
76	Víctor Corrales	Spain	25:38
77	Abdelkader Khanous	Algeria	25:40
78	François Leprovost	France	25:40
79	Paulo Pinheiro	Portugal	25:40
80	Sityhilo Diko	South Africa	25:45
81	Simon Horsfield	United Kingdom	25:45
82	Senzo Nkosi	South Africa	25:46
83	Benoit Calandreau	France	25:47
84	Sebastian Martos	Spain	25:47
85	Guillermo Durán	Spain	25:48
86	Robert Moldovan	United States	25:49
87	Mohamed Mahcene	Algeria	25:51
88	Hicham El Amrani	Morocco	25:52
89	David Flynn	Ireland	25:53
90	Ashley Watson	Australia	25:58
91	Liam Tremble	Ireland	26:01
92	Carlos Alonso	Spain	26:02
93	Phillip Berntsen	United Kingdom	26:06
94	Ian Ward	Ireland	26:09
95	Houssem Bouallagui	France	26:11
96	Viacheslav Shalamov	Russia	26:13
97	Víctor Aravena	Chile	26:15
98	Anatoly Yakovlev	Russia	26:19
99	Patrick Hogan	Ireland	26:23
100	Éderson Pereira	Brazil	26:25
101	Yousef Al-Lathaa	Yemen	26:30
102	Anthony Baumal	France	26:39
103	Jorge Santa Cruz	Portugal	26:52
104	Sydney Ngwenya	South Africa	26:57
105	Sven Spanic	Croatia	27:11
106	Ivan Khitrov	Russia	28:19
107	Motasem Akkawi	Jordan	29:40
108	Ahmed Taher	United Arab Emirates	31:16
—	Dmitry Zubkov	Russia	DNF

==== Teams ====
Rank	Team	Points
1st place, gold medalist(s)	Kenya: Lucas Kimeli Rotich / 3; Titus Kipjumba Mbishei / 5; Mathew Kipkoech Kisorio / 6; Peter Kimeli Some / 7; (Levy Matebo Omari) / (10); (Charles Kibet Chepkurui) / (15)	21
2nd place, silver medalist(s)	Ethiopia: Ibrahim Jeilan / 1; Ayele Abshero / 2; Hunegnaw Mesfin / 11; Feyisa Liesa / 14; (Dejen Gebremeskel) / (18); (Yetwale Kende) / (21)	28
3rd place, bronze medalist(s)	Uganda: Benjamin Kiplagat / 4; Geofrey Kusuro / 8; Stephen Kiprotich / 12; Abraham Kiplimo / 13; (Ben Siwa) / (22)	37
4	Japan: Hirotaka Tamura / 20; Shun Kurihara / 32; Hiroyuki Sasaki / 33; Ryuji Kashiwabara / 34; (Akinobu Murasawa) / (37); (Kenta Chiba) / (44)	119
5	Morocco: Youssef Nasir / 27; Adil Rached / 29; Mohamed Mekkaoui / 39; Abdelghani Aït Bahmad / 41; (Abdellah Dacha) / (58); (Hicham El Amrani) / (88)	136
6	United States: German Fernandez / 25; Emil Heineking / 26; Kevin Williams / 35; Ryan Sheridan / 52; (Benjamin Johnson) / (72); (Robert Moldovan) / (86)	138
7	Canada: Matthew Leeder / 30; Aleksandr Kuternin / 50; Mohammed Ahmed / 51; Matthew Hughes / 57; (Nyjal Majock) / (60); (Peter Corrigan) / (66)	188
8	Algeria: Abdelmadjed Touil / 42; Imad Touil / 43; Houssem Rouabhi / 45; Moussa Ziani / 70; (Abdelkader Khanous) / (77); (Mohamed Mahcene) / (87)	200
9	United Kingdom: David Forrester / 24; Mitchell Goose / 55; Ross Murray / 56; Dewi Griffiths / 67; (Simon Horsfield) / (81); (Phillip Berntsen) / (93)	202
10	Australia: Ryan Gregson / 31; Richard Everest / 47; Duer Yoa / 54; Ashley Watson / 90	222
11	France: Sidi-Hassan Chahdi / 23; Simon Denissel / 64; François Leprovost / 78; Benoit Calandreau / 83; (Houssem Bouallagui) / (95); (Anthony Baumal) / (102)	248
12	Spain: Daniel Mateo / 61; José Manuel González / 68; Víctor Corrales / 76; Sebastian Martos / 84; (Guillermo Durán) / (85); (Carlos Alonso) / (92)	289
13	Brazil: José Márcio Da Silva / 62; Gilberto Lopes / 63; Paulo Carvalho / 74; Éderson Pereira / 100	299
14	Ireland: Craig Murphy / 48; Michael Mulhare / 75; David Flynn / 89; Liam Tremble / 91; (Ian Ward) / (94); (Patrick Hogan) / (99)	303
15	Russia: Mark Tolstikhin / 65; Evgeny Ryzhov / 73; Viacheslav Shalamov / 96; Anatoly Yakovlev / 98; (Ivan Khitrov) / (106); (Dmitry Zubkov) / (DNF)	332

- Note: Athletes in parentheses did not score for the team result.

== Participation ==
According to an unofficial count, 109 athletes from 30 countries participated in the Junior men's race. This is in agreement with the official numbers as published.

- Algeria (6)
- Australia (4)
- Brazil (4)
- Canada (6)
- Chile (1)
- Croatia (1)
- Eritrea (3)
- Ethiopia (6)
- France (6)
- Ireland (6)
- Italy (1)
- Japan (6)
- Jordan (1)
- Kenya (6)
- Morocco (6)
- New Zealand (2)
- Norway (1)
- Poland (1)
- Portugal (3)
- Qatar (1)
- Russia (6)
- South Africa (3)
- Spain (6)
- Turkey (3)
- Uganda (5)
- United Arab Emirates (1)
- United Kingdom (6)
- United States (6)
- Yemen (1)
- Zambia (1)

== See also ==
- 2008 IAAF World Cross Country Championships – Senior men's race
- 2008 IAAF World Cross Country Championships – Senior women's race
- 2008 IAAF World Cross Country Championships – Junior women's race
