= 2008 IAAF World Cross Country Championships – Senior women's race =

Senior women's race at the 2008 IAAF World Cross Country Championships
- Organisers: IAAF
- Edition: 36th
- Date: March 30
- Host city: Edinburgh, Scotland, United Kingdom
- Venue: Holyrood Park
- Events: 1
- Distances: 7.905 km – Senior women
- Participation: 95 athletes from 29 nations

The Senior women's race at the 2008 IAAF World Cross Country Championships was held at the Holyrood Park in Edinburgh, United Kingdom, on March 30, 2008. Reports of the event were given in The New York Times, in the Herald, and for the IAAF.

Complete results for individuals, and for teams were published.

== Race results ==
=== Senior women's race (7.905 km) ===
==== Individual ====
Rank	Athlete	Country	Time
1st place, gold medalist(s)	Tirunesh Dibaba	Ethiopia	25:10
2nd place, silver medalist(s)	Mestawet Tufa	Ethiopia	25:15
3rd place, bronze medalist(s)	Linet Chepkwemoi Masai	Kenya	25:18
4	Doris Chepkwemoi Changeywo	Kenya	25:34
5	Hilda Kibet	Netherlands	25:35
6	Gelete Burka	Ethiopia	25:35
7	Priscah Jepleting Cherono	Kenya	25:36
8	Margaret Wangari Muriuki	Kenya	25:46
9	Meselech Melkamu	Ethiopia	25:51
10	Grace Kwamboka Momanyi	Kenya	25:54
11	Benita Johnson	Australia	25:56
12	Lineth Chepkurui	Kenya	26:05
13	Asmae Leghzaoui	Morocco	26:06
14	Koren Jelela	Ethiopia	26:12
15	Liz Yelling	United Kingdom	26:13
16	Aselefech Mergia	Ethiopia	26:28
17	Kareema Jasim	Bahrain	26:29
18	Emily Brown	United States	26:36
19	Saadia Bourgailh-Haddioui	France	26:36
20	Lisa Jane Weightman	Australia	26:37
21	Hayley Yelling	United Kingdom	26:39
22	Katie McGregor	United States	26:40
23	Molly Huddle	United States	26:40
24	Kathy Newberry	United States	26:42
25	Simret Sultan	Eritrea	26:43
26	Melissa Rollison	Australia	26:50
27	Anna Thompson	Australia	26:56
28	Soud Kanbouchia	Morocco	26:59
29	Ikram Zouglali	Morocco	26:59
30	Ouafae Frikech	Morocco	27:02
31	Furtuna Zegergish	Eritrea	27:03
32	Elena Romagnolo	Italy	27:06
33	Susanne Hahn	Germany	27:09
34	Inês Monteiro	Portugal	27:12
35	Alessandra Aguilar	Spain	27:13
36	Fionnuala Britton	Ireland	27:14
37	Leonor Carneiro	Portugal	27:14
38	Laura Kenney	United Kingdom	27:15
39	Diana Martín	Spain	27:17
40	Jacqueline Martín	Spain	27:20
41	Melinda Vernon	Australia	27:23
42	Rachel Townend	United Kingdom	27:24
43	Meraf Bahta	Eritrea	27:31
44	Mónica Rosa	Portugal	27:32
45	Faye Fullerton	United Kingdom	27:32
46	Yuko Nohara	Japan	27:35
47	Aimi Horikoshi	Japan	27:40
48	Maria Laghrissi	Morocco	27:42
49	Renee Metivier-Baillie	United States	27:49
50	Sara Moreira	Portugal	27:50
51	Amleset Tewelde	Eritrea	27:51
52	Jiang Chengcheng	China	27:53
53	Jo Wilkinson	United Kingdom	27:54
54	Victoria Mitchell	Australia	27:57
55	Christine Bardelle	France	27:59
56	Kazue Kojima	Japan	28:04
57	Linda Byrne	Ireland	28:05
58	Megumi Seike	Japan	28:09
59	Kenza Dahmani	Algeria	28:12
60	Elizet Banda	Zambia	28:14
61	Judith Plá	Spain	28:16
62	Amy Hastings	United States	28:18
63	Alexandra Becker	Canada	28:20
64	Elizabeth Wightman	Canada	28:25
65	Zhor El Kamch	Morocco	28:27
66	Deirdre Byrne	Ireland	28:28
67	Konstadína Kefalá	Greece	28:31
68	Aya Manome	Japan	28:31
69	Sara Yusuf Yaqoob	Bahrain	28:37
70	Zenaide Vieira	Brazil	28:45
71	Kazuka Wakatsuki	Japan	28:46
72	Ana Dulce Félix	Portugal	28:50
73	Orla O'Mahoney	Ireland	28:52
74	Chichi Germia	Eritrea	28:52
75	Catherine Chikwakwa	Malawi	28:59
76	Maria Zeferina Baldaia	Brazil	28:59
77	Lisa Harvey	Canada	29:00
78	Marelise Retief	South Africa	29:08
79	Suzanne Binne-Huse	Canada	29:15
80	Annette Kealy	Ireland	29:18
81	Susan McCormack	Ireland	29:29
82	Ledile Raseboya	South Africa	29:38
83	Erin MacLean	Canada	29:44
84	Francine Nzilampa	DR Congo	29:57
85	Iulia Fernas	Kyrgyzstan	30:10
86	Ntombesintu Mfunzi	South Africa	30:11
87	Rosângela Faria	Brazil	30:38
88	Sarah Abu Hassan	Egypt	32:00
89	Anifa Khalilova	Azerbaijan	35:55
90	Mariana Carpine	DR Congo	40:01
—	Fatna Maraoui	Italy	DNF
—	Jéssica Augusto	Portugal	DNF
—	Mahri Gokiyeva	Turkmenistan	DNF
—	Isabel Cristina Da Silva	Brazil	DNF
—	Rosa Morató	Spain	DNF
—	Maria Kebang	Nigeria	DNS
—	Angeline Nyiransabimana	Rwanda	DNS
—	Tabitha Tsatsa	Zimbabwe	DNS
—	Nadia Ejjafini	Bahrain	DNS

==== Teams ====
Rank	Team	Points
1st place, gold medalist(s)	Ethiopia: Tirunesh Dibaba / 1; Mestawet Tufa / 2; Gelete Burka / 6; Meselech Melkamu / 9; (Koren Jelela) / (14); (Aselefech Mergia) / (16)	18
2nd place, silver medalist(s)	Kenya: Linet Chepkwemoi Masai / 3; Doris Chepkwemoi Changeywo / 4; Priscah Jepleting Cherono / 7; Margaret Wangari Muriuki / 8; (Grace Kwamboka Momanyi) / (10); (Lineth Chepkurui) / (12)	22
3rd place, bronze medalist(s)	Australia: Benita Johnson / 11; Lisa Jane Weightman / 20; Melissa Rollison / 26; Anna Thompson / 27; (Melinda Vernon) / (41); (Victoria Mitchell) / (54)	84
4	United States: Emily Brown / 18; Katie McGregor / 22; Molly Huddle / 23; Kathy Newberry / 24; (Renee Metivier-Baillie) / (49); (Amy Hastings) / (62)	87
5	Morocco: Asmae Leghzaoui / 13; Soud Kanbouchia / 28; Ikram Zouglali / 29; Ouafae Frikech / 30; (Maria Laghrissi) / (48); (Zhor El Kamch) / (65)	100
6	United Kingdom: Liz Yelling / 15; Hayley Yelling / 21; Laura Kenney / 38; Rachel Townend / 42; (Faye Fullerton) / (45); (Jo Wilkinson) / (53)	116
7	Eritrea: Simret Sultan / 25; Furtuna Zegergish / 31; Meraf Bahta / 43; Amleset Tewelde / 51; (Chichi Germia) / (74)	150
8	Portugal: Inês Monteiro / 34; Leonor Carneiro / 37; Mónica Rosa / 44; Sara Moreira / 50; (Ana Dulce Félix) / (72); (Jéssica Augusto) / (DNF)	165
9	Spain: Alessandra Aguilar / 35; Diana Martín / 39; Jacqueline Martín / 40; Judith Plá / 61; (Rosa Morató) / (DNF)	175
10	Japan: Yuko Nohara / 46; Aimi Horikoshi / 47; Kazue Kojima / 56; Megumi Seike / 58; (Aya Manome) / (68); (Kazuka Wakatsuki) / (71)	207
11	Ireland: Fionnuala Britton / 36; Linda Byrne / 57; Deirdre Byrne / 66; Orla O'Mahoney / 73; (Annette Kealy) / (80); (Susan McCormack) / (81)	232
12	Canada: Alexandra Becker / 63; Elizabeth Wightman / 64; Lisa Harvey / 77; Suzanne Binne-Huse / 79; (Erin MacLean) / (83)	283

- Note: Athletes in parentheses did not score for the team result.

== Participation ==
According to an unofficial count, 95 athletes from 29 countries participated in the Senior women's race. This is in agreement with the official numbers as published. The announced athletes from Nigeria, Rwanda, and Zimbabwe did not show.

- Algeria (1)
- Australia (6)
- Azerbaijan (1)
- Bahrain (2)
- Brazil (4)
- Canada (5)
- China (1)
- DR Congo (2)
- Egypt (1)
- Eritrea (5)
- Ethiopia (6)
- France (2)
- Germany (1)
- Greece (1)
- Ireland (6)
- Italy (2)
- Japan (6)
- Kenya (6)
- Kyrgyzstan (1)
- Malawi (1)
- Morocco (6)
- Netherlands (1)
- Portugal (6)
- South Africa (3)
- Spain (5)
- Turkmenistan (1)
- United Kingdom (6)
- United States (6)
- Zambia (1)

== See also ==
- 2008 IAAF World Cross Country Championships – Senior men's race
- 2008 IAAF World Cross Country Championships – Junior men's race
- 2008 IAAF World Cross Country Championships – Junior women's race
