= 2008 IAAF World Cross Country Championships – Senior men's race =

Senior men's race at the 2008 IAAF World Cross Country Championships
- Organisers: IAAF
- Edition: 36th
- Date: March 30
- Host city: Edinburgh, Scotland, United Kingdom
- Venue: Holyrood Park
- Events: 1
- Distances: 12 km – Senior men
- Participation: 179 athletes from 45 nations

The Senior men's race at the 2008 IAAF World Cross Country Championships was held at the Holyrood Park in Edinburgh, United Kingdom, on March 30, 2008. Reports of the event were given in The New York Times, in the Herald, and for the IAAF.

Complete results for individuals, and for teams were published.

== Race results ==
=== Senior men's race (12 km) ===
==== Individual ====
| Rank | Athlete | Country | Time |
|---|---|---|---|
| 1st place, gold medalist(s) | Kenenisa Bekele | Ethiopia | 34:38 |
| 2nd place, silver medalist(s) | Leonard Patrick Komon | Kenya | 34:41 |
| 3rd place, bronze medalist(s) | Zersenay Tadese | Eritrea | 34:43 |
| 4 | Joseph Ebuya | Kenya | 34:47 |
| 5 | Moses Ndiema Masai | Kenya | 35:02 |
| 6 | Felix Kikwai Kibore | Qatar | 35:15 |
| 7 | Gideon Lekumok Ngatuny | Kenya | 35:16 |
| 8 | Ahmad Hassan Abdullah | Qatar | 35:18 |
| 9 | Habtamu Fikadu | Ethiopia | 35:19 |
| 10 | Bernard Kiprop Kipyego | Kenya | 35:24 |
| 11 | Hosea Mwok Macharinyang | Kenya | 35:24 |
| 12 | Augustine Kiprono Choge | Kenya | 35:26 |
| 13 | Moses Kipsiro | Uganda | 35:29 |
| 14 | Mark Kosgei Kiptoo | Kenya | 35:39 |
| 15 | Sileshi Sihine | Ethiopia | 35:40 |
| 16 | Boniface Kiprop | Uganda | 35:41 |
| 17 | Gebre-egziabher Gebremariam | Ethiopia | 35:59 |
| 18 | John Kimondo Thuo | Kenya | 36:00 |
| 19 | Jorge Torres | United States | 36:03 |
| 20 | Yonas Kifle | Eritrea | 36:09 |
| 21 | Dereje Debele | Ethiopia | 36:10 |
| 22 | Sultan Khamis Zaman | Qatar | 36:12 |
| 23 | Teklemariam Medhin | Eritrea | 36:13 |
| 24 | Juan Carlos de la Ossa | Spain | 36:15 |
| 25 | Mubarak Hassan Shami | Qatar | 36:17 |
| 26 | Kidane Tadasse | Eritrea | 36:25 |
| 27 | Cuthbert Nyasango | Zimbabwe | 36:28 |
| 28 | Abdellah Falil | Morocco | 36:30 |
| 29 | Martin Toroitich | Uganda | 36:33 |
| 30 | Jamel Chatbi | Morocco | 36:35 |
| 31 | Craig Mottram | Australia | 36:40 |
| 32 | Anis Selmouni | Morocco | 36:42 |
| 33 | Abdelhadi El Mouaziz | Morocco | 36:43 |
| 34 | Gamal Belal Salem | Qatar | 36:43 |
| 35 | Ahmed Baday | Morocco | 36:46 |
| 36 | Ayad Lamdassem | Spain | 36:49 |
| 37 | Brahim Beloua | Morocco | 36:49 |
| 38 | Amanuel Woldeselassie | Eritrea | 36:50 |
| 39 | Khalid Kamal Yaseen | Bahrain | 36:51 |
| 40 | Chakir Boujattaoui | Morocco | 36:51 |
| 41 | Abebe Dinkesa | Ethiopia | 36:51 |
| 42 | Yahia Azaïdj | Algeria | 36:52 |
| 43 | Josh Rohatinsky | United States | 36:52 |
| 44 | Moorosi Soke | South Africa | 36:53 |
| 45 | Edwardo Torres | United States | 36:56 |
| 46 | Wilson Busienei | Uganda | 37:02 |
| 47 | Mourad Marofit | Morocco | 37:04 |
| 48 | Essa Ismail Rashed | Qatar | 37:07 |
| 49 | Moses Aliwa | Uganda | 37:08 |
| 50 | Michael Shelley | Australia | 37:09 |
| 51 | Scott Bauhs | United States | 37:15 |
| 52 | Tewoldeberhan Mengisteab | Eritrea | 37:15 |
| 53 | Marílson Dos Santos | Brazil | 37:17 |
| 54 | Max King | United States | 37:20 |
| 55 | Simon Ayeko | Uganda | 37:20 |
| 56 | José Manuel Martínez | Spain | 37:21 |
| 57 | Zembaba Yigeze | Ethiopia | 37:22 |
| 58 | Gianmarco Buttazzo | Italy | 37:24 |
| 59 | Ahmed Naïli | Algeria | 37:27 |
| 60 | Aadam Ismaeel Khamis | Bahrain | 37:27 |
| 61 | Ali Dawoud Sedam | Qatar | 37:27 |
| 62 | Thomas Humphries | United Kingdom | 37:27 |
| 63 | Nicholas Kiprono | Uganda | 37:32 |
| 64 | Carles Castillejo | Spain | 37:34 |
| 65 | Michael Skinner | United Kingdom | 37:35 |
| 66 | Andrew Ledwith | Ireland | 37:37 |
| 67 | Moustafa Ahmed Shebto | Qatar | 37:40 |
| 68 | David McNeill | Australia | 37:41 |
| 69 | Liam Adams | Australia | 37:41 |
| 70 | Andrea Lalli | Italy | 37:44 |
| 71 | Licinio Pimentel | Portugal | 37:44 |
| 72 | Frank Tickner | United Kingdom | 37:49 |
| 73 | Collis Birmingham | Australia | 37:49 |
| 74 | Stephen Mokoka | South Africa | 37:52 |
| 75 | Al Mustafa Riyadh | Bahrain | 37:53 |
| 76 | Manuel Damião | Portugal | 37:55 |
| 77 | Mike Tebulo | Malawi | 37:57 |
| 78 | Andrew Lemoncello | United Kingdom | 37:57 |
| 79 | Andrew Jones | United Kingdom | 37:57 |
| 80 | Jean-Berchmans Ndayisenga | Burundi | 38:00 |
| 81 | Naser Jamal Naser | Qatar | 38:02 |
| 82 | Philip Wicks | United Kingdom | 38:02 |
| 83 | José Luis Blanco | Spain | 38:02 |
| 84 | James Carney | United States | 38:04 |
| 85 | Antonio David Jiménez | Spain | 38:06 |
| 86 | Kiflom Sium | Eritrea | 38:07 |
| 87 | Iván Galán | Spain | 38:10 |
| 88 | Yoshitaka Iwamizu | Japan | 38:11 |
| 89 | Rabie Mekhloufi | Algeria | 38:11 |
| 90 | James Gosselin | Canada | 38:12 |
| 91 | Paulo Gomes | Portugal | 38:13 |
| 92 | Ali Mabrouk El Zaidi | Libya | 38:13 |
| 93 | Yuki Sato | Japan | 38:19 |
| 94 | Tsuyoshi Ugachi | Japan | 38:20 |
| 95 | Joël Bourgeois | Canada | 38:23 |
| 96 | Jonathan Pierce | United States | 38:23 |
| 97 | Rabah Aboud | Algeria | 38:24 |
| 98 | Aïssa Dahmar | Algeria | 38:24 |
| 99 | Daniele Meucci | Italy | 38:28 |
| 100 | José Rocha | Portugal | 38:28 |
| 101 | Boiphemelo Selagaboy | Botswana | 38:29 |
| 102 | Samuel Tsegay | Eritrea | 38:30 |
| 103 | Kaelo Mosalagae | Botswana | 38:31 |
| 104 | Martin Dent | Australia | 38:31 |
| 105 | Makoto Tobimatsu | Japan | 38:32 |
| 106 | Hermano Ferreira | Portugal | 38:33 |
| 107 | Moeketsi Mosuhli | Lesotho | 38:34 |
| 108 | Andrew Letherby | Australia | 38:35 |
| 109 | Ryan Bak | United States | 38:36 |
| 110 | Jonay González | Spain | 38:39 |
| 111 | Cédric Pelissier | France | 38:42 |
| 112 | Brahim Chettah | Algeria | 38:43 |
| 113 | Ihar Tsetserukou | Belarus | 38:43 |
| 114 | Andrew Vernon | United Kingdom | 38:43 |
| 115 | Yuki Nakamura | Japan | 38:43 |
| 116 | Alex Hutchinson | Canada | 38:44 |
| 117 | Roberto Oliveira | Brazil | 38:45 |
| 118 | José Ramos | Portugal | 38:45 |
| 119 | Reyes Estévez | Spain | 38:47 |
| 120 | Satoru Kitamura | Japan | 38:48 |
| 121 | Unaswi Dambe | Botswana | 38:48 |
| 122 | Hiroyoshi Umegae | Japan | 38:49 |
| 123 | Hidekazu Sato | Japan | 38:51 |
| 124 | Damião Ancelmo De Souza | Brazil | 39:00 |
| 125 | James Walsh | United Kingdom | 39:01 |
| 126 | Ben St.Lawrence | Australia | 39:02 |
| 127 | Jesper Faurschou | Denmark | 39:03 |
| 128 | Paul McNamara | Ireland | 39:05 |
| 129 | Dylan Wykes | Canada | 39:06 |
| 130 | Nathan Chebet | Uganda | 39:10 |
| 131 | Ahmed Dali | Algeria | 39:11 |
| 132 | Yang Dinghong | China | 39:11 |
| 133 | Ueli Koch | Switzerland | 39:12 |
| 134 | Rapula Diphoko | Botswana | 39:12 |
| 135 | Mick Clohisey | Ireland | 39:13 |
| 136 | John Beattie | United Kingdom | 39:21 |
| 137 | Abdelatif Chemlal | Morocco | 39:25 |
| 138 | Derek Nakluski | Canada | 39:26 |
| 139 | Solomon Tsige | Ethiopia | 39:26 |
| 140 | Brian Maher | Ireland | 39:29 |
| 141 | Dong Guojian | China | 39:33 |
| 142 | Yuri Chechun | Kyrgyzstan | 39:42 |
| 143 | Spencer Morrison | Canada | 39:45 |
| 144 | Gary Thornton | Ireland | 39:50 |
| 145 | Colin Fewer | Canada | 39:52 |
| 146 | Dimcho Mitsov | Bulgaria | 39:53 |
| 147 | Ahmed Hassein Hassein | Egypt | 39:56 |
| 148 | Sevak Yeghikyan | Armenia | 39:57 |
| 149 | Adel Mahdjoub | Libya | 39:58 |
| 150 | Cleve Thorson | Canada | 40:01 |
| 151 | Alexandra Motone | South Africa | 40:18 |
| 152 | José Eloy | Brazil | 40:19 |
| 153 | Huang Jinhong | China | 40:26 |
| 154 | Cleveland Forde | Guyana | 40:27 |
| 155 | Shepherd Kenatshele | Botswana | 40:27 |
| 156 | Rees Buck | New Zealand | 40:34 |
| 157 | José Maduro | Portugal | 40:35 |
| 158 | Mohammad Al Kafraini | Jordan | 41:00 |
| 159 | Trevor Caldwell | Canada | 41:47 |
| 160 | Ditiro Ramagapu | Botswana | 42:03 |
| 161 | José Ferreira | Brazil | 42:23 |
| 162 | Gaylord Silly | Seychelles | 43:03 |
| 163 | Perhat Annagylyjov | Turkmenistan | 43:27 |
| 164 | Fikret Gafarov | Azerbaijan | 45:37 |
| 165 | Christopher Symonds | Ghana | 46:56 |
| — | Ricardo Ribas | Portugal | DNF |
| — | Mahmoud Abuattaya | Palestine | DNF |
| — | Cosme Ancelmo De Souza | Brazil | DNF |
| — | Vincent Mulvey | Ireland | DNF |
| — | Alistair Ian Cragg | Ireland | DNF |
| — | Abdulhak Elgorche Zakaria | Bahrain | DNF |
| — | Ed Moran | United States | DNF |
| — | Alejandro Suárez | Mexico | DNF |
| — | Dieudonné Disi | Rwanda | DNF |
| — | Stefano La Rosa | Italy | DNF |
| — | Demssew Tsega | Ethiopia | DNF |
| — | Hasan Mahboob | Bahrain | DNF |
| — | Saif Hamad Al-Rashedi | United Arab Emirates | DQ |
| — | Fathi Meftah | Algeria | DQ^{†} |
| — | Saleh Besheer Madjed | Bahrain | DNS |
| — | Roman Prodius | Moldova | DNS |
| — | Arjun Kumar Basnet | Nepal | DNS |
| — | Danjuma Kopkuddi | Nigeria | DNS |
| — | Akhilomeh Joseph | Nigeria | DNS |
| — | Gervais Hakizimana | Rwanda | DNS |
| — | Sylvain Rukundo | Rwanda | DNS |
| — | Jean Baptiste Simukeka | Rwanda | DNS |
| — | Khamis Sultan Dawood | Bahrain | DNS |

^{†}: Fathi Meftah from Algeria finished 35th in 36:44 min, but was disqualified because of doping violations.

==== Teams ====
| Rank | Team | Points |
|---|---|---|
| 1st place, gold medalist(s) | Kenya: Leonard Patrick Komon / 2; Joseph Ebuya / 4; Moses Ndiema Masai / 5; Gideon Lekumok Ngatuny / 7; Bernard Kiprop Kipyego / 10; Hosea Mwok Macharinyang / 11; (Augustine Kiprono Choge) / (12); (Mark Kosgei Kiptoo) / (14); (John Kimondo Thuo) / (18) | 39 |
| 2nd place, silver medalist(s) | Ethiopia: Kenenisa Bekele / 1; Habtamu Fikadu / 9; Sileshi Sihine / 15; Gebre-egziabher Gebremariam / 17; Dereje Debele / 21; Abebe Dinkesa / 41; (Zembaba Yigeze) / (57); (Solomon Tsige) / (139); (Demssew Tsega) / (DNF) | 104 |
| 3rd place, bronze medalist(s) | Qatar: Felix Kikwai Kibore / 6; Ahmad Hassan Abdullah / 8; Sultan Khamis Zaman / 22; Mubarak Hassan Shami / 25; Gamal Belal Salem / 34; Essa Ismail Rashed / 48; (Ali Dawoud Sedam) / (61); (Moustafa Ahmed Shebto) / (67); (Naser Jamal Naser) / (81) | 143 |
| 4 | Eritrea: Zersenay Tadese / 3; Yonas Kifle / 20; Teklemariam Medhin / 23; Kidane Tadasse / 26; Amanuel Woldeselassie / 38; Tewoldeberhan Mengisteab / 52; (Kiflom Sium) / (86); (Samuel Tsegay) / (102) | 162 |
| 5 | Morocco: Abdellah Falil / 28; Jamel Chatbi / 30; Anis Selmouni / 32; Abdelhadi El Mouaziz / 33; Ahmed Baday / 35; Brahim Beloua / 37; (Chakir Boujattaoui) / (40); (Mourad Marofit) / (47); (Abdelatif Chemlal) / (137) | 195 |
| 6 | Uganda: Moses Kipsiro / 13; Boniface Kiprop / 16; Martin Toroitich / 29; Wilson Busienei / 46; Moses Aliwa / 49; Simon Ayeko / 55; (Nicholas Kiprono) / (63); (Nathan Chebet) / (130) | 208 |
| 7 | United States: Jorge Torres / 19; Josh Rohatinsky / 43; Edwardo Torres / 45; Scott Bauhs / 51; Max King / 54; James Carney / 84; (Jonathan Pierce) / (96); (Ryan Bak) / (109); (Ed Moran) / (DNF) | 296 |
| 8 | Spain: Juan Carlos de la Ossa / 24; Ayad Lamdassem / 36; José Manuel Martínez / 56; Carles Castillejo / 64; José Luis Blanco / 83; Antonio David Jiménez / 85; (Iván Galán) / (87); (Jonay González) / (110); (Reyes Estévez) / (119) | 348 |
| 9 | Australia: Craig Mottram / 31; Michael Shelley / 50; David Mcneill / 68; Liam Adams / 69; Collis Birmingham / 73; Martin Dent / 104; (Andrew Letherby) / (108); (Ben St.Lawrence) / (126) | 395 |
| 10 | United Kingdom: Thomas Humphries / 62; Michael Skinner / 65; Frank Tickner / 72; Andrew Lemoncello / 78; Andrew Jones / 79; Philip Wicks / 82; (Andrew Vernon) / (114); (James Walsh) / (125); (John Beattie) / (136) | 438 |
| 11 | Algeria: Yahia Azaïdj / 42; Ahmed Naïli / 59; Rabie Mekhloufi / 89; Rabah Aboud / 97; Aïssa Dahmar / 98; Brahim Chettah / 112; (Ahmed Dali) / (131); (Fathi Meftah) / (DQ) | 497 |
| 12 | Portugal: Licinio Pimentel / 71; Manuel Damião / 76; Paulo Gomes / 91; José Rocha / 100; Hermano Ferreira / 106; José Ramos / 118; (José Maduro) / (157); (Ricardo Ribas) / (DNF) | 562 |
| 13 | Japan: Yoshitaka Iwamizu / 88; Yuki Sato / 93; Tsuyoshi Ugachi / 94; Makoto Tobimatsu / 105; Yuki Nakamura / 115; Satoru Kitamura / 120; (Hiroyoshi Umegae) / (122); (Hidekazu Sato) / (123) | 615 |
| 14 | Canada: James Gosselin / 90; Joël Bourgeois / 95; Alex Hutchinson / 116; Dylan Wykes / 129; Derek Nakluski / 138; Spencer Morrison / 143; (Colin Fewer) / (145); (Cleve Thorson) / (150); (Trevor Caldwell) / (159) | 711 |
| 15 | Botswana: Boiphemelo Selagaboy / 101; Kaelo Mosalagae / 103; Unaswi Dambe / 121; Rapula Diphoko / 134; Shepherd Kenatshele / 155; Ditiro Ramagapu / 160 | 774 |

- Note: Athletes in parentheses did not score for the team result.

== Participation ==
According to an unofficial count, 179 athletes from 45 countries participated in the Senior men's race. This is in agreement with the official numbers as published. The announced athletes from Moldova, Nepal, and Nigeria did not show.

- Algeria (8)
- Armenia (1)
- Australia (8)
- Azerbaijan (1)
- Bahrain (5)
- Belarus (1)
- Botswana (6)
- Brazil (6)
- Bulgaria (1)
- Burundi (1)
- Canada (9)
- China (3)
- Denmark (1)
- Egypt (1)
- Eritrea (8)
- Ethiopia (9)
- France (1)
- Ghana (1)
- Guyana (1)
- Ireland (7)
- Italy (4)
- Japan (8)
- Jordan (1)
- Kenya (9)
- Kyrgyzstan (1)
- Lesotho (1)
- Libya (2)
- Malawi (1)
- Mexico (1)
- Morocco (9)
- New Zealand (1)
- Palestine (1)
- Portugal (8)
- Qatar (9)
- Rwanda (1)
- Seychelles (1)
- South Africa (3)
- Spain (9)
- Switzerland (1)
- Turkmenistan (1)
- Uganda (8)
- United Arab Emirates (1)
- United Kingdom (9)
- United States (9)
- Zimbabwe (1)

== See also ==
- 2008 IAAF World Cross Country Championships – Junior men's race
- 2008 IAAF World Cross Country Championships – Senior women's race
- 2008 IAAF World Cross Country Championships – Junior women's race
