= 2008 IAAF World Cross Country Championships – Junior women's race =

Junior women's race at the 2008 IAAF World Cross Country Championships
- Organisers: IAAF
- Edition: 36th
- Date: March 30
- Host city: Edinburgh, Scotland, United Kingdom
- Venue: Holyrood Park
- Events: 1
- Distances: 6.04 km – Junior women
- Participation: 65 athletes from 23 nations

The Junior women's race at the 2008 IAAF World Cross Country Championships was held at the Holyrood Park in Edinburgh, United Kingdom, on March 30, 2008. Reports of the event were given in The New York Times, in the Herald, and for the IAAF.

Complete results for individuals, and for teams were published.

== Race results ==
=== Junior women's race (6.04 km) ===
==== Individual ====
Rank	Athlete	Country	Time
1st place, gold medalist(s)	Genzebe Dibaba	Ethiopia	19:59
2nd place, silver medalist(s)	Irine Chepet Cheptai	Kenya	20:04
3rd place, bronze medalist(s)	Emebt Etea	Ethiopia	20:06
4	Delvine Relin Meringor	Kenya	20:06
5	Emebet Bacha	Ethiopia	20:11
6	Jackline Chebii	Kenya	20:11
7	Betelhem Moges	Ethiopia	20:13
8	Dorcas Jepchirchir Kiptarus	Kenya	20:17
9	Tigist Memuye	Ethiopia	20:27
10	Yukino Ninomiya	Japan	20:30
11	Bitaw Yehune	Ethiopia	20:33
12	Christine Kambua Muyanga	Kenya	20:34
13	Alexandra Gits	United States	20:41
14	Atsuko Matsumura	Japan	20:47
15	Asami Kato	Japan	20:48
16	Charlotte Purdue	United Kingdom	20:52
17	Laura Park	United Kingdom	20:58
18	Ayaka Mori	Japan	21:02
19	Cristina Jordán	Spain	21:05
20	Kendra Schaaf	Canada	21:06
21	Emily Brichacek	Australia	21:09
22	Kokob Mehari	Eritrea	21:13
23	Paula Findlay	Canada	21:13
24	Elise Clayton	Australia	21:15
25	Danelle Woods	Canada	21:15
26	Risa Takenaka	Japan	21:15
27	Emma Pallant	United Kingdom	21:17
28	Emily Schwitzer	United States	21:19
29	Laurynne Chetelat	United States	21:19
30	Emily Reese	United States	21:22
31	Lindsay Carson	Canada	21:26
32	Sara Louise Treacy	Ireland	21:27
33	Mercy Jelimo Kosgei	Kenya	21:31
34	Tamara Carvolth	Australia	21:31
35	Joanne Harvey	United Kingdom	21:32
36	Geneviève Lalonde	Canada	21:35
37	Sandra Mosquera	Spain	21:37
38	Lauren Saylor	United States	21:37
39	Barkahoum Drici	Algeria	21:44
40	Marina Gordeeva	Russia	21:48
41	Emily Pidgeon	United Kingdom	21:49
42	Miriam Thole	Malawi	21:52
43	Lillian Partridge	United Kingdom	21:53
44	Marissa Treece	United States	21:55
45	Daniela Cunha	Portugal	21:58
46	Liudmila Lebedeva	Russia	21:59
47	Veronica Inglese	Italy	22:05
48	Yukari Abe	Japan	22:15
49	Emmie Charayron	France	22:18
50	Valeria Roffino	Italy	22:24
51	Karolina Waszak	Poland	22:24
52	Paula Mayobre	Spain	22:27
53	Patricia Barry	Ireland	22:32
54	Alexis McKillop	Australia	22:41
55	Tamara Jewett	Canada	22:43
56	Nandipha Dywili	South Africa	22:45
57	Ruth Croft	New Zealand	22:55
58	Tatiana Prorokova	Russia	23:04
59	Daria Furkalo	Russia	23:13
60	Valentina Belovic	Croatia	23:34
61	Bara'ah Awadallah	Jordan	23:47
62	Makampong Masaile	Lesotho	24:09
63	Ala'ziad Khalifah	Jordan	24:21
64	Snezhana Ivanova	Russia	25:27
65	Govher Jumeniyazova	Turkmenistan	25:27
—	Clémence Calvin	France	DNS

==== Teams ====
Rank	Team	Points
1st place, gold medalist(s)	Ethiopia: Genzebe Dibaba / 1; Emebt Etea / 3; Emebet Bacha / 5; Betelhem Moges / 7; (Tigist Memuye) / (9); (Bitaw Yehune) / (11)	16
2nd place, silver medalist(s)	Kenya: Irine Chepet Cheptai / 2; Delvine Relin Meringor / 4; Jackline Chebii / 6; Dorcas Jepchirchir Kiptarus / 8; (Christine Kambua Muyanga) / (12); (Mercy Jelimo Kosgei) / (33)	20
3rd place, bronze medalist(s)	Japan: Yukino Ninomiya / 10; Atsuko Matsumura / 14; Asami Kato / 15; Ayaka Mori / 18; (Risa Takenaka) / (26); (Yukari Abe) / (48)	57
4	United Kingdom: Charlotte Purdue / 16; Laura Park / 17; Emma Pallant / 27; Joanne Harvey / 35; (Emily Pidgeon) / (41); (Lillian Partridge) / (43)	95
5	Canada: Kendra Schaaf / 20; Paula Findlay / 23; Danelle Woods / 25; Lindsay Carson / 31; (Geneviève Lalonde) / (36); (Tamara Jewett) / (55)	99
6	United States: Alexandra Gits / 13; Emily Schwitzer / 28; Laurynne Chetelat / 29; Emily Reese / 30; (Lauren Saylor) / (38); (Marissa Treece) / (44)	100
7	Australia: Emily Brichacek / 21; Elise Clayton / 24; Tamara Carvolth / 34; Alexis McKillop / 54	133
8	Russia: Marina Gordeeva / 40; Liudmila Lebedeva / 46; Tatiana Prorokova / 58; Daria Furkalo / 59; (Snezhana Ivanova) / (64)	203

- Note: Athletes in parentheses did not score for the team result.

== Participation ==
According to an unofficial count, 65 athletes from 23 countries participated in the Junior women's race. This is in agreement with the official numbers as published.

- Algeria (1)
- Australia (4)
- Canada (6)
- Croatia (1)
- Eritrea (1)
- Ethiopia (6)
- France (1)
- Ireland (2)
- Italy (2)
- Japan (6)
- Jordan (2)
- Kenya (6)
- Lesotho (1)
- Malawi (1)
- New Zealand (1)
- Poland (1)
- Portugal (1)
- Russia (5)
- South Africa (1)
- Spain (3)
- Turkmenistan (1)
- United Kingdom (6)
- United States (6)

== See also ==
- 2008 IAAF World Cross Country Championships – Senior men's race
- 2008 IAAF World Cross Country Championships – Junior men's race
- 2008 IAAF World Cross Country Championships – Senior women's race
