= 2012 Boston Marathon =

Footrace in Boston, Massachusetts, USA

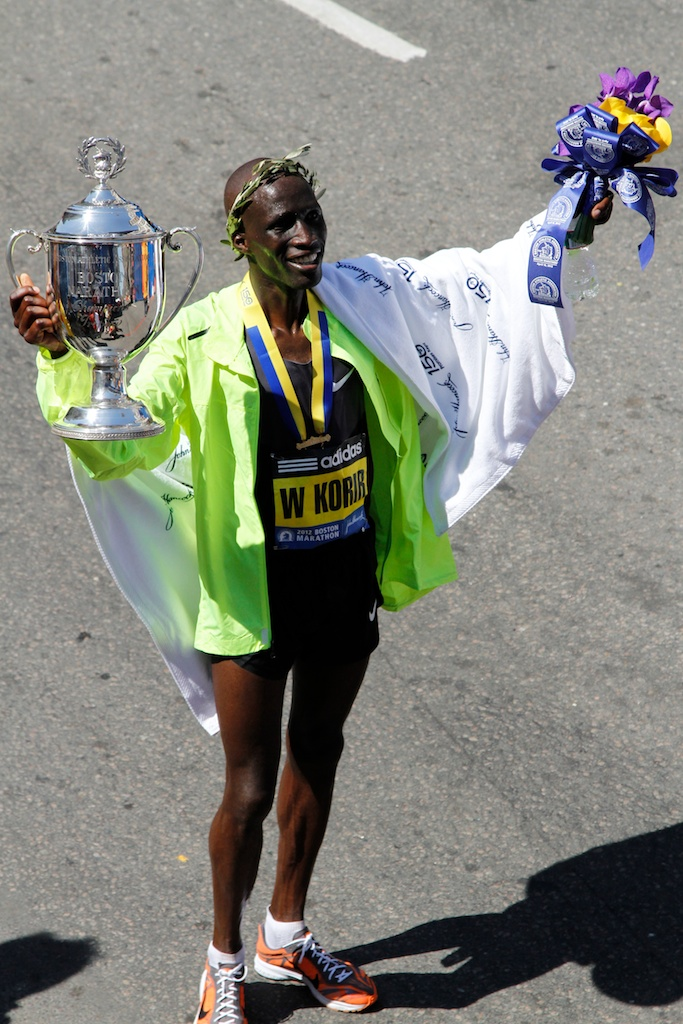
- Kenyan Wesley Korir celebrates his victory in the men's race
- Venue: Boston, Massachusetts
- Dates: April 16

Champions
- Men: Wesley Korir (2:12:40)
- Women: Sharon Cherop (2:31:50)
- Wheelchair men: Josh Cassidy (1:18:25)
- Wheelchair women: Shirley Reilly (1:37:36)

The 2012 Boston Marathon took place in Boston, Massachusetts on Monday April 16, 2012. It was the 116th edition of the mass-participation marathon. Organized by the Boston Athletic Association, it was the first of the World Marathon Majors series to be held in 2012. A total of 22,426 runners started the race. The competition was held in hot running conditions, reaching 88 °F (31 °C) that afternoon, and some of the 27,000 registered runners opted to take up the organizers' offer to defer their entry until the 2013 race.

Wesley Korir and Sharon Cherop won the elite men's and women's races respectively. Josh Cassidy and Shirley Reilly were the winners of the wheelchair racing section. In the masters section, Uli Steidl won the men's marathon and Svetlana Pretot (ninth overall) was the women's champion.

== Race description ==
=== Build up ===
The champions from 2011, Geoffrey Mutai and Caroline Kilel, announced their intentions to try to defend their titles at the start of the year. A large number of fast elite runners were invited to compete at the event, most of them being Ethiopian or Kenyan. Mutai was the pre-race favourite, with his two most prominent rivals being 2010 Boston winner Robert Kiprono Cheruiyot and 2010 New York City Marathon champion Gebre Gebremariam. Levy Matebo and Wilson Chebet were the other fastest runners, who entered the competition with personal bests under two hours and six minutes. Defending women's champion Kilel was not the fastest entrant in her section: Russia's Galina Bogomolova and Ethiopians Aselefech Mergia and Mamitu Daska had better personal bests. Sharon Cherop (third at the 2011 race) and Firehiwot Dado (reigning New York champion) were also prominent competitors.

The most prominent American athletes, such as 2011 Boston top-five finishers Ryan Hall, Desiree Davila and Kara Goucher, missed the 2012 edition of the Boston race as they focused their preparations towards the marathon at the 2012 London Olympics instead.

=== Men's race ===
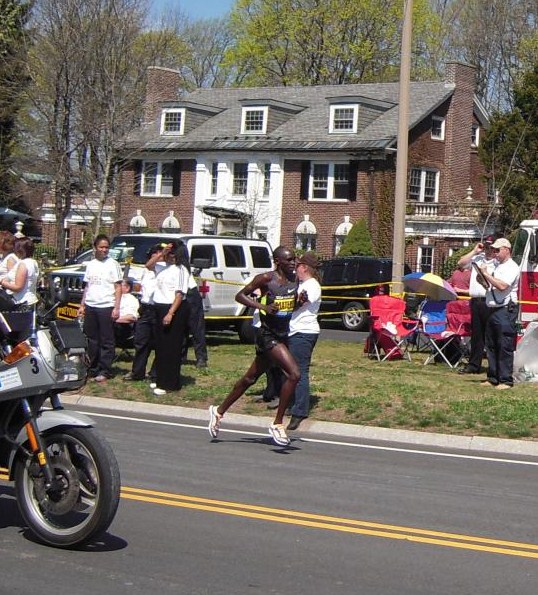
Men's runner-up Levy Matebo at Heartbreak Hill.

In the men's race, fifteen runners reached the halfway point in a time of 1:06:11 hours (some minutes slower than previous years). Soon after, Mathew Kisorio upped the pace and reduced the leading pack to himself, Matebo, Mutai, Chebet, Wesley Korir and Laban Korir. After 18 miles (29 km) Kisorio and Matebo had broken away and defending champion Mutai had pulled out of the race altogether.

As the course began its uphill stage, Kisorio slowed significantly and Matebo held a clear lead at 23 miles (37 km). However, he too began to slow and Wesley Korir, who had kept a more even pace, made his way up the field and took the lead at 25 miles (40 km). Korir won in a time of 2:12:40 hours with Matebo over twenty seconds behind. The rest of the midpoint leaders slowed in the latter stages and Kenya's Bernard Kipyego and American Jason Hartmann moved up to take third and fourth place.

=== Women's race ===
The women's field was reduced in calibre before the start as Bogomolova, Aselefech Mergia and Mamitu Daska were all pre-race withdrawals. The race began slowly—the runners responding to the heat—and it was not until 12.5 miles (20.1 km) that the large pack of elite runners began to break up. By the halfway point Agnes Kiprop and Rita Jeptoo had fallen half a minute behind. Upon reaching the first major uphill section after 17 miles (27 km), Caroline Rotich, Diana Sigei Chepkemoi and Genet Getaneh progressively fell behind the leading pace. A volunteer attempting to assist the leading runners by handing them some water actually disrupted the pack at 18 miles (29 km) and defending champion Caroline Kilel dramatically slowed soon after, eventually dropping out at 40 kilometres (25 mi).

The final section of the race at Heartbreak Hill saw Firehiwot Dado fall out of contention, leaving just a Kenyan trio of Sharon Cherop, Georgina Rono and Jemima Jelagat Sumgong to battle out the medal positions. Cherop increased the pace and at the 25-mile mark (40 km) Rono had slipped behind and just Cherop and Sumgong remained. The two engaged in a battle to the finish and it was the 2011 runner-up Cherop who came out on top, recording a time of 2:31:50 hours, with Sumgong finishing just two seconds behind. Rono made it a Kenyan podium sweep as she was next to cross the line just over a minute later.

== Results ==
=== Elite men ===
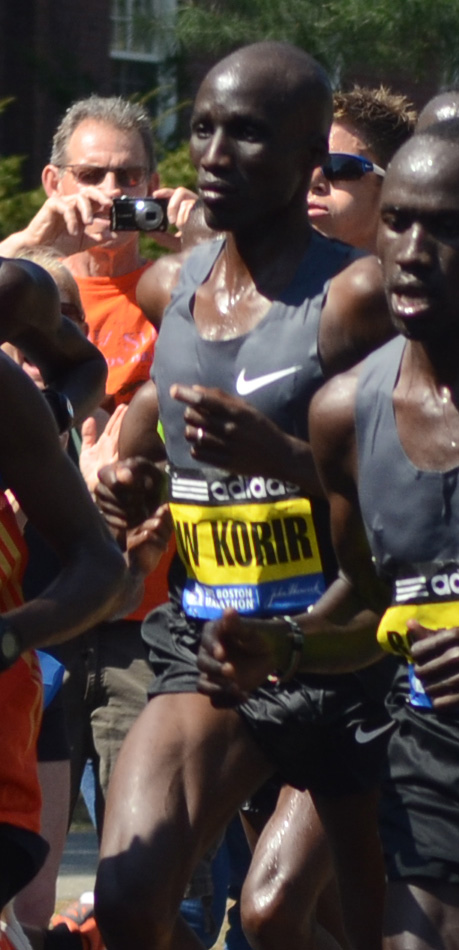
Wesley Korir mid-race in the leading pack of the 2012 Boston Marathon

Place	Athlete	Nationality	Time
Gold medal	Wesley Korir	Kenya	2:12:40
Silver medal	Levy Matebo	Kenya	2:13:06
Bronze medal	Bernard Kipyego	Kenya	2:13:13
4	Jason Hartmann	United States	2:14:31
5	Wilson Chebet	Kenya	2:14:56
6	Laban Korir	Kenya	2:15:29
7	Michel Butter	Netherlands	2:16:38
8	David Barmasai	Kenya	2:17:16
9	Hideaki Tamura	Japan	2:18:15
10	Mathew Kisorio	Kenya	2:18:15

=== Elite women ===
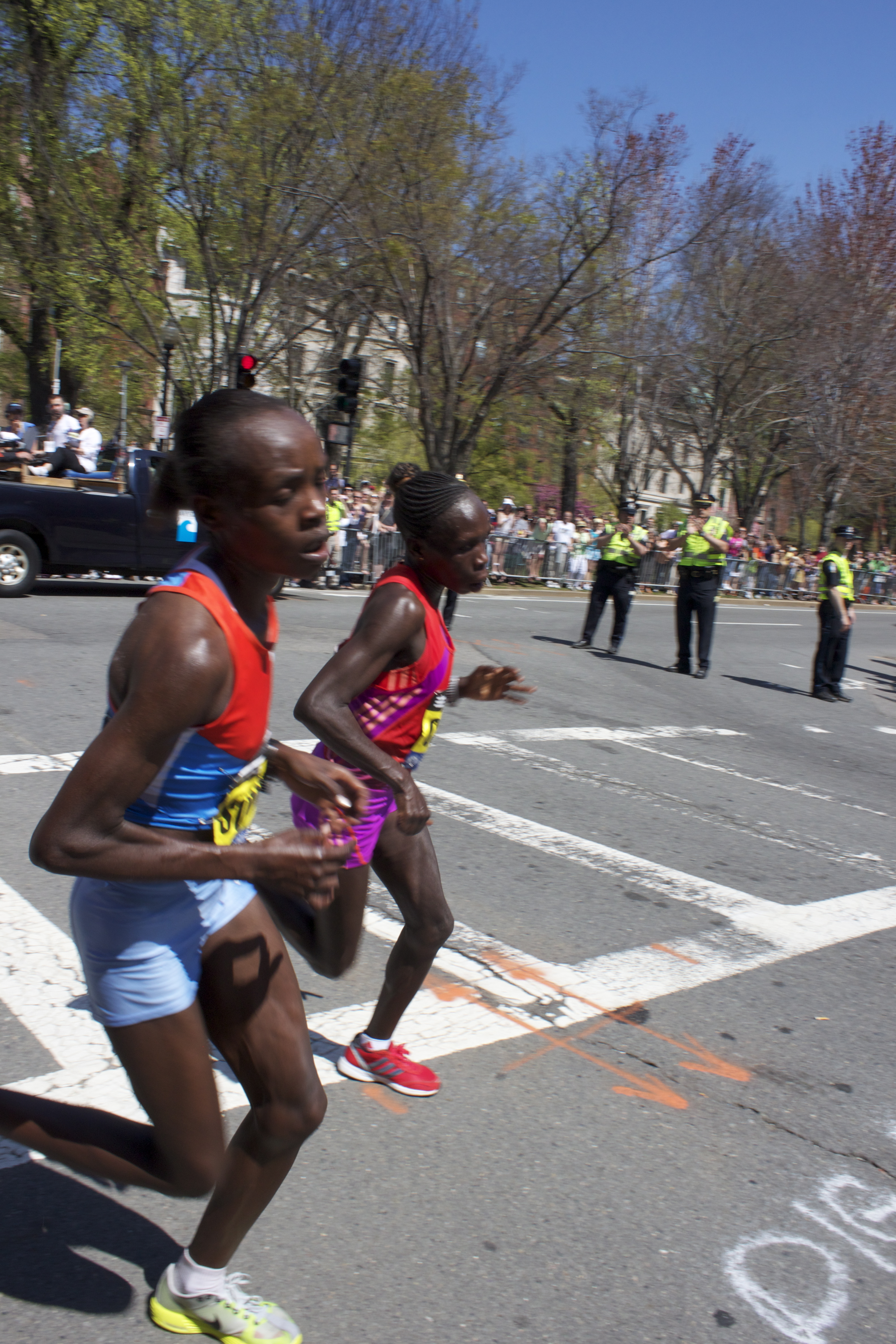
Jemima Jelagat Sumgong and Sharon Cherop racing in the final stage of the women's race

Place	Athlete	Nationality	Time
Gold medal	Sharon Cherop	Kenya	2:31:50
Silver medal	Jemima Jelagat Sumgong	Kenya	2:31:52
Bronze medal	Georgina Rono	Kenya	2:33:09
4	Firehiwot Dado	Ethiopia	2:34:56
5	Diana Sigei	Kenya	2:35:40
6	Rita Jeptoo	Kenya	2:35:53
7	Mayumi Fujita	Japan	2:39:11
8	Nadezdha Leonteva	Russia	2:40:40
9	Svetlana Pretot	France	2:40:50
10	Sheri Piers	United States	2:41:55

=== Wheelchair men ===
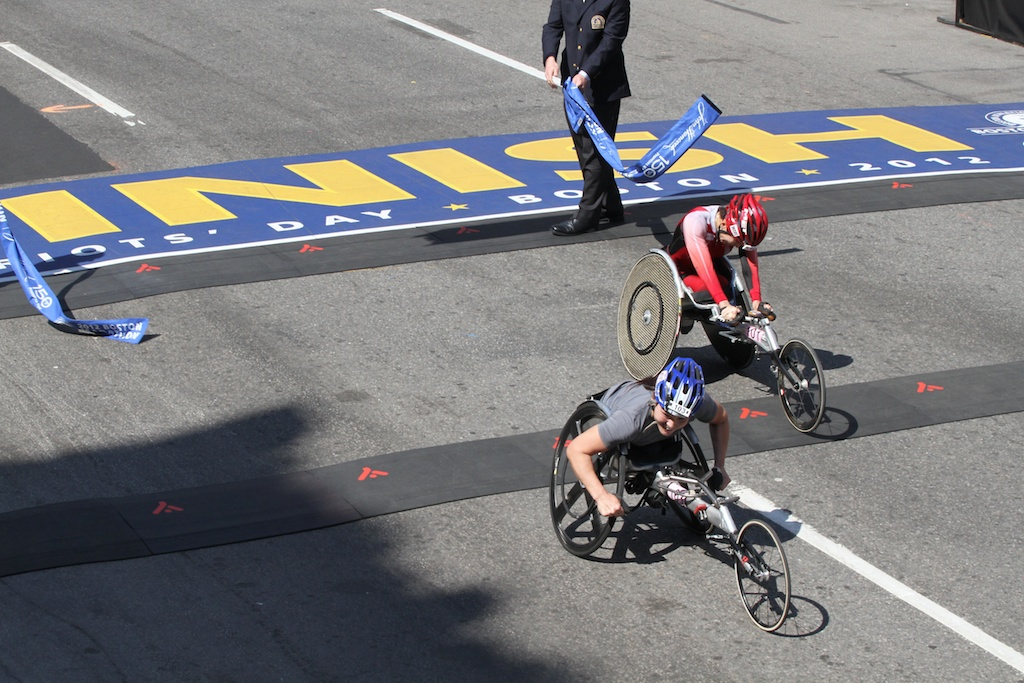
Shirley Reilly beating Wakako Tsuchida to win the women's wheelchair race

Place	Athlete	Nationality	Time
Gold medal	Josh Cassidy	Canada	1:18:25
Silver medal	Kurt Fearnley	Australia	1:21:39
Bronze medal	Kota Hokinoue	Japan	1:23:26

=== Wheelchair women ===
Place	Athlete	Nationality	Time
Gold medal	Shirley Reilly	United States	1:37:36
Silver medal	Wakako Tsuchida	Japan	1:37:37
Bronze medal	Diane Roy	Canada	1:42:37
