= Mick Clohisey =

Irish marathon runner

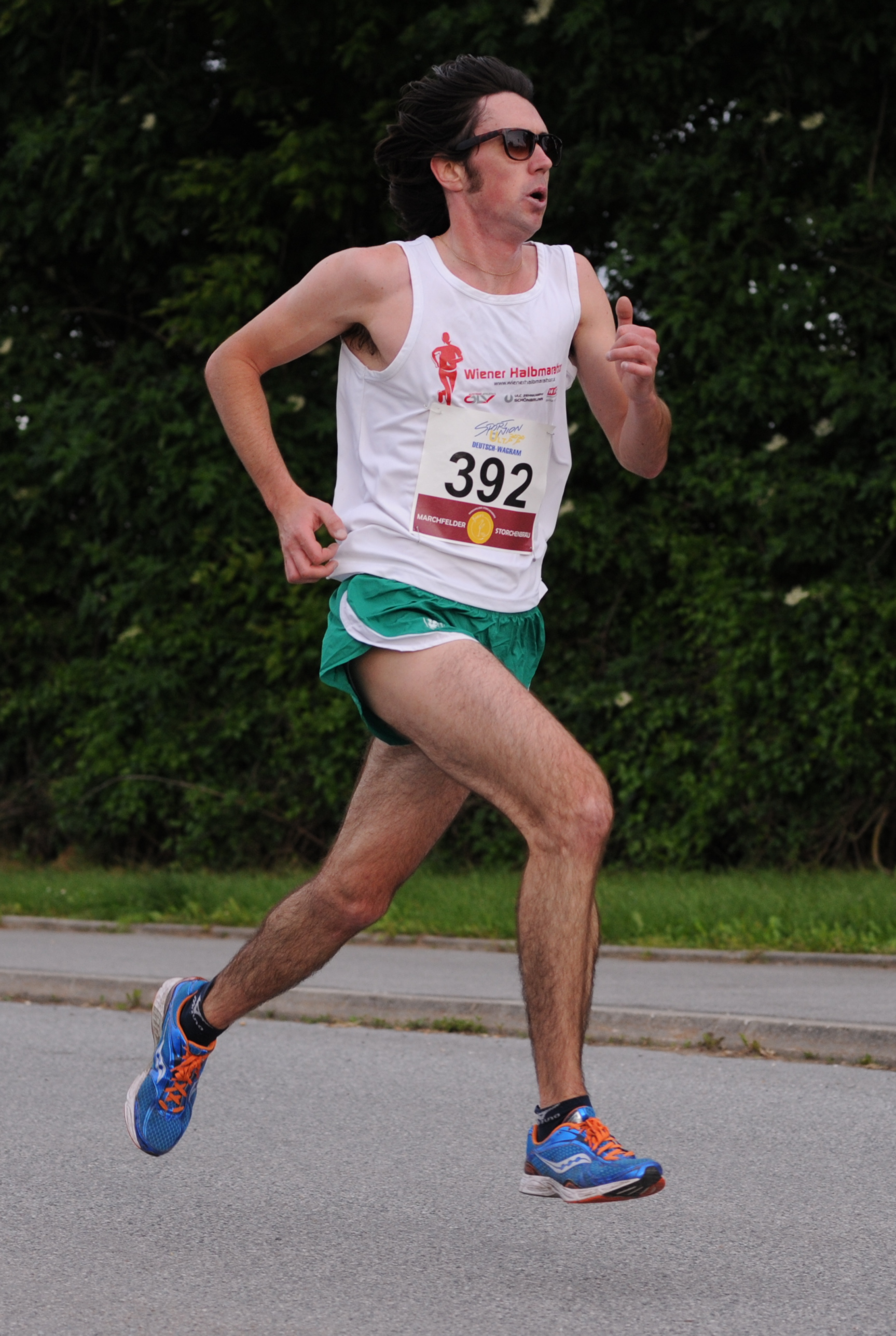
- Clohisey in 2014

Personal information
- Nationality: Irish
- Born: January 13, 1986 (age 40)
- Height: 180 cm (5 ft 11 in)
- Weight: 64 kg (141 lb)

Sport
- Country: Ireland
- Sport: Athletics
- Events: marathon, half marathon
- Club: Raheny Shamrock Athletic Club
- Coached by: Dick Hooper

Achievements and titles
- Personal best: 2:13:19 (marathon)

Mick Clohisey (born 13 January 1986) is an Irish marathon runner.

In 2014, he won the Vienna City Half Marathon and the 2014 Irish national cross country title.

In 2016, he finished 32nd in the men's half marathon at the 2016 European Athletics Championships.

Clohisey was selected to represent Ireland at the 2016 Olympics, and finished 103rd in the marathon. He finished 22nd at the 2017 World Championships.

He runs for the Raheny Shamrocks, and won the Belfast Marathon in 2021.

== International competition ==
Year	Competition	Venue	Position	Event	Notes
Representing Ireland
2005	European Cross Country Championships	Tilburg, Netherlands	68th	U20 Men Individual	19:45
2006	European Cross Country Championships	San Giorgio su Legnano, Italy	46th	U23 Men Individual	24:15
2007	European Cross Country Championships	Toro, Spain	53rd	U23 Men Individual	25:57
2008	World Cross Country Championships	Edinburgh, United Kingdom	135th	Senior Men Individual	39:13
2008	European Cross Country Championships	Brussels, Belgium	37th	U23 Men Individual	26:16
2009	European Cross Country Championships	Dublin, Ireland	52nd	Senior Men Individual	33:33
2013	European Cross Country Championships	Belgrade, Serbia	55th	Senior Men Individual	31:23
2014	Great South Run	Portsmouth, United Kingdom	16th	10 Miles	49:27
2014	Barcelona Half Marathon	Barcelona, Spain	4th	Half Marathon	1:05:38
2014	Vienna Half Marathon	Vienna, Austria	1st	Half Marathon	1:06:36
2014	Gothenburg Half Marathon	Gothenburg, Sweden	19th	Half Marathon	1:07:33
2014	European Cross Country Championships	Samokov, Bulgaria	43rd	Senior Men Individual	34:36
2015	Barcelona Half Marathon	Barcelona, Spain	11th	Half Marathon	1:04:40
2015	Rotterdam Marathon	Rotterdam Marathon, Netherlands	18th	Marathon	2:17:43
2015	Berlin Marathon	Berlin, Germany	28th	Marathon	2:15:35
2015	European Cross Country Championships	Hyères, France	37th	Senior Men Individual	31:13
2016	Waterford Half Marathon	Waterford, Ireland	1st	Half Marathon	1:04:25
2016	Seville Marathon	Seville, Spain	9th	Marathon	2:15:11
2016	European Athletics Championships	Amsterdam, Netherlands	32nd	Half Marathon	1:06:00
2016	Olympic Games	Rio de Janeiro, Brazil	102nd	Marathon	2:26:34
2016	European Cross Country Championships	Chia, Italy	43rd	Senior Men Individual	29:54
2017	Great South Run	Portsmouth, United Kingdom	5th	10 Miles	49:02
2017	London Marathon	London, United Kingdom	28th	Marathon	2:18:34
2017	World Championships	London, United Kingdom	22nd	2:16:21	
2018	Seville Marathon	Seville, Spain	12th	Marathon	2:14:55
2018	European Championships	Berlin, Germany	18th	Marathon	2:18:00
2018	European Cross Country Championships	Tilburg, Netherlands	67th	Senior Men Individual	31:11
2019	London Marathon	London, United Kingdom	23rd	Marathon	2:15:06
2019	Dublin Half Marathon	Dublin, Ireland	2nd	Half Marathon	1:05:36
2020	London Marathon	London, United Kingdom	26th	Marathon	2:18:52
2022	Dublin Marathon	Dublin, Marathon	25th	Marathon	2:31:39
