= 2007 African Junior Athletics Championships =

8th African Junior Championships
- Dates: 9 – 12 August
- Host city: Ouagadougou, Burkina Faso
- Level: Under-20
- Events: 44

The 2007 African Junior Athletics Championships was the eighth edition of the biennial, continental athletics tournament for African athletes aged 19 years or younger. It was held in Ouagadougou, Burkina Faso, from 9–12 August. A total of 44 events were contested, 22 by men and 22 by women.

== Medal table ==
* Host nation (Ivory Coast)

Rank	NOC	Gold	Silver	Bronze	Total
1	Kenya (KEN)	13	5	4	22
2	South Africa (RSA)	10	6	6	22
3	Egypt (EGY)	4	4	1	9
4	Ethiopia (ETH)	3	8	5	16
5	Morocco (MAR)	3	5	3	11
6	Algeria (ALG)	3	3	2	8
7	Tunisia (TUN)	2	0	3	5
8	Zimbabwe (ZIM)	2	0	0	2
9	Burkina Faso (BUR)	1	3	6	10
10	Mali (MLI)	1	1	1	3
11	Sudan (SUD)	1	0	1	2
12	Ghana (GHA)	0	2	4	6
13	Cameroon (CMR)	0	2	0	2
13	Libya (LBA)	0	2	0	2
15	Benin (BEN)	0	1	0	1
15	Mauritius (MRI)	0	1	0	1
17	Ivory Coast (CIV)*	0	0	2	2
18	Botswana (BOT)	0	0	1	1
18	Gabon (GAB)	0	0	1	1
18	Senegal (SEN)	0	0	1	1
Totals (20 entries)		43	43	41	127

== Medal summary ==
=== Men ===
Event	Gold		Silver		Bronze	
100 metres	Gabriel Mvumvure (ZIM)	10.51	Idriss Khalid Zougari (MAR)	10.71	Kagisho Kumbane (RSA)	10.75
200 metres	Gabriel Mvumvure (ZIM)	21.03	Idriss Khalid Zougari (MAR)	21.25	Kagisho Kumbane (RSA)	21.50
400 metres	Julius Kirwa (KEN)	46.56	Silvester Kirwa Meli (KEN)	47.41	Pako Seribe (BOT)	47.44
800 metres	David Rudisha (KEN)	1:46.41	Leonard Kibet Kiplagat (KEN)	1:47.95	Nadjim Manseur (ALG)	1:48.20
1500 metres	Cornelius Ndiwa (KEN)	3:46.47	Dawit Wolde (ETH)	3:46.71	Dumisane Hlaselo (RSA)	3:49.25
5000 metres	Mathew Kisorio (KEN)	14:13.25	Degen Gebremskel (ETH)	14:14.96	Dino Sefir (ETH)	14:15.53
10,000 metres	Mathew Kisorio (KEN)	29:34.96	Hunegnaw Mesfin (ETH)	30:02.17	Imane Merga (ETH)	30:12.03
110 metres hurdles	Louw Smit (RSA)	13.98	Idris Abdelrahman (EGY)	14.23	Moussa Dembélé (SEN)	14.36
400 metres hurdles	John Kituu Wambua (KEN)	52.02	Amine Gounieber (ALG)	52.20	Tanarat Teklu (ETH)	52.63
3000 metres steeplechase	Abel Mutai (KEN)	8:29.76	Yacob Jarso (ETH)	8:29.99	Patrick Terer (KEN)	8:29.99
4 × 100 m relay	South Africa (RSA)	40.61	Burkina Faso (BUR)	41.39	Ghana (GHA)	41.46
4 × 400 m relay	Kenya (KEN)	3:09.90	Ghana (GHA)	3:13.89	South Africa (RSA)	3:15.38
10,000 metres walk	Maher Ben Halima (TUN)	53:09.98	Amine Djerarfaoui (ALG)	53:10.67	Degu Sore (ETH)	55:13.67
High jump	Karim Lotfy (EGY)	2.17 m	Hubert De Beer (RSA)	2.15 m	Sean Stone (RSA)	2.01 m
Pole vault	Karim El-Mafhoum (MAR)	4.60 m	Larbi Bourada (ALG)	4.60 m	Mouhcine Cheaouri (MAR)	4.40 m
Long jump	Keenan Watson (RSA)	7.79 m (w)	Ethan Alexander (RSA)	7.52 m	Mohamed Yassine Chaieb (TUN)	7.44 m
Triple jump	Seif Islam Temacini (ALG)	15.58 m	Edwin Kemei (KEN)	14.88 m	Mohamed Amin Trabelsi (TUN)	14.83 m
Shot put	Jan Hoffman (RSA)	19.03 m	Orazio Cremona (RSA)	17.66 m	Moussa Diarra (GAB)	16.69 m
Discus throw	Victor Hogan (RSA)	56.35 m	Jan Hoffman (RSA)	54.57 m	Becave Coulibaly (MLI)	42.42 m
Hammer throw	Mostafa Al-Gamel (EGY)	66.36 m	Alaa El-Din (EGY)	63.51 m	Clinton Williams (RSA)	61.51 m
Javelin throw	Mohamed Ali Kebabou (TUN)	71.47 m	Ferney Kitvsoff (RSA)	69.22 m	Ihab El-Sayed (EGY)	65.63 m
Decathlon	Mehdi Mouaci (ALG)	6604 pts	Nicolas Castor (MRI)	6346 pts	Richard Adou (CIV)	4859 pts

=== Women ===
Event	Gold		Silver		Bronze	
100 metres	Constance Mkenku (RSA)	11.65	Sergine Kouanga (CMR)	11.88	Fadoua Adili (MAR)	12.10
200 metres	Constance Mkenku (RSA)	23.96	Sergine Kouanga (CMR)	24.42	Pamela Jelimo (KEN)	24.68
400 metres	Pamela Jelimo (KEN)	54.93	Benjamine Saka (BEN)	56.20	Vivian Mills (GHA)	57.04
800 metres	Lydia Wafula (KEN)	2:06.05	Halima Hachlaf (MAR)	2:06.13	Amina Bakhit (SUD)	2:06.38
1500 metres	Emebt Etea (ETH)	4:17.39	Mercy Kosgei (KEN)	4:20.41	Halima Hachlaf (MAR)	4:20.91
3000 metres	Emebt Etea (ETH)	9:07.53	Bizunesh Urgesa (ETH)	9:12.10	Jacklin Chebii (KEN)	9:20.59
5000 metres	Mary Ngugi (KEN)	15:50.55	Makida Haruna (ETH)	15:52.17	Pauline Korikwiang (KEN)	15:59.61
100 metres hurdles	Tété Traore (BUR)	14.26	Salma Abou Emam (EGY)	14.41	Claudia Viljoen (RSA)	14.48
400 metres hurdles	Fayza Omer Jomaa (SUD)	58.59	Hayat Lambarki (MAR)	59.10	Gnouwéré Coulibaly (BUR)	62.70
3000 metres steeplechase	Mueni Mutai (KEN)	10:02.46	Beatrice Kiprop (KEN)	10:10.06	Trihas Gebre (ETH)	10:17.30
4 × 100 m relay	South Africa (RSA)	46.60	Burkina Faso (BUR)	48.10	Ghana (GHA)	48.37
4 × 400 m relay	Kenya (KEN)	3:49.52	Ghana (GHA)	3:53.54	Burkina Faso (BUR)	3:56.24
10,000 metres walk	Bekashign Aynalem (ETH)	52:53.79	Tegist Bedilu (ETH)	54:17.69	Afef El-Trabelsi (TUN)	55:10.63
High jump	Marcoleen Pretorius (RSA)	1.75 m	Meryem Ouahbi (MAR)	1.61 m	Salamatou Moussa (GHA)	1.55 m
Pole vault	All three entrants failed to clear a height					
Long jump	Yamina Hjaji (MAR)	5.97 m	Christy Coetzee (RSA)	5.94 m	Enas Gharib (EGY)	5.89 m
Triple jump	Yamina Hjaji (MAR)	12.33 m	Enas Gharib (EGY)	12.32 m	Worokia Sanou (BUR)	12.24 m
Shot put	Walaa Atteya (EGY)	12.95 m	Nakani Coulibaly (MLI)	12.95 m	Liliane Kragbe (CIV)	9.30 m
Discus throw	Mariam Traore (MLI)	36.50 m	Ebtehal Aboud (LBA)	36.22 m	Rose Nacoulma (BUR)	25.19 m
Hammer throw	Noura Zakaria (EGY)	42.84 m	Ebtehal Aboud (LBA)	16.90 m	Sonia Halliche (ALG)	13.03 m
Javelin throw	Gerlize De Klerk (RSA)	49.18 m	Abaynesh Sisay (ETH)	41.04 m	Rose Nacoulma (BUR)	39.37 m
Heptathlon	Katia Amokrane (ALG)	4316 pts	Korotimi Traore (BUR)	3601 pts	Emmanuelle Bagabila (BUR)	3456 pts
