= Ben St Lawrence =

Australian long-distance runner

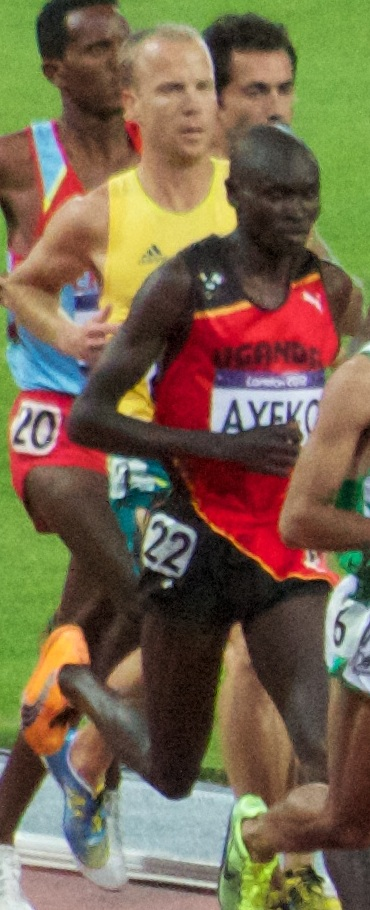
- Ben St Lawrence (in yellow) at the 2012 Summer Olympics

Personal information
- Nationality: Australian
- Born: 7 November 1981 (age 44) Penrith, New South Wales, Australia
- Height: 1.79 m (5 ft 10 in)
- Weight: 65 kg (143 lb)

Sport
- Sport: Track and field
- Events: 5,000 metres 10,000 metres

Achievements and titles
- Personal bests: 5,000 metres: 13:10.08; 10,000 metres: 27:24.95

Ben St Lawrence (born 7 November 1981) is an Australian long-distance runner who specialises in the 5,000 and 10,000 metres. He is the former Australian and Oceanian record holder in the 10,000 metres. St Lawrence competed in the 2012 Summer Olympics in London and qualified for the 2016 Summer Olympics in Rio de Janeiro. St Lawrence qualified for the 10,000 metres in both instances. He has also qualified for two World Championships, two World Cross Country Championships and two Commonwealth Games.

== Competition ==
St Lawrence's debut at an international athletics competition was at the 2008 World Cross Country Championships where he competed in the senior men's race; finishing 126th in at time 39 minutes and two seconds. He then competed in the 2010 Notturna di Milano 3,000 meter race, placing 7th with 7 minutes and 42 seconds. Later in the year, he competed at the 2010 Commonwealth Games and finished 7th in both the 5,000 metres and the 10,000 metres.

At the 2011 World Championships St Lawrence competed in the 5000 metres and finished 11th in his heat and therefore did not progress to the final. Also in 2011 was the World Cross Country Championships where St Lawrence finished 60th, 66 places better than his previous World Cross Country Championships.

For the 2012 Summer Olympics, St Lawrence qualified for the 10,000 metres on the first day of the qualification window. At the Olympics, he finished 20th in his race. St Lawrence's next major competition was the 2013 World Championships where he competed in both the 5,000 metres and the 10,000 metres. In the 5,000 metres he finished 18th in his heat and didn't progress to the final and in the 10,000 metres he reached the final before withdrawing.

He competed in his 2nd Commonwealth Games in the 2014 edition. He reached the final of the 10,000 metres and finished 16th. St Lawrence qualified for the 10,000 metres for the 2016 Summer Olympics in May 2015 at the athletics track in Palo Alto, California; the same track on which he qualified for the 2012 Olympics.

Domestically, St Lawrence has won six Australian titles; five at the track and field championships and one at the road running-championships. At the most recent track and field championships in 2016 St Lawrence finished 3rd in the 5,000 metres.
