= Levy Matebo Omari =

Kenyan long-distance runner (born 1989)

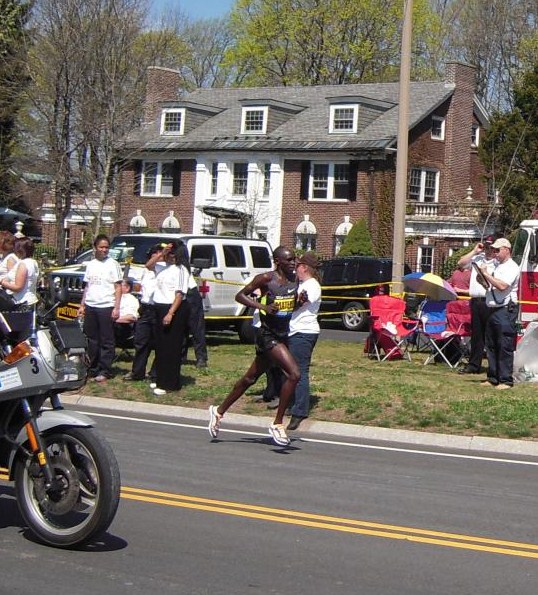
Matebo nearing the end of the 2012 Boston Marathon

Levy Matebo Omari (born 3 November 1989) is a Kenyan long-distance runner who competes mainly in marathon races. Matebo has a personal best of 2:05:16 hours for the 42.195 km distance, which he set as a runner-up at the 2011 Frankfurt Marathon. He was also second at the Boston Marathon in 2012. He has won marathons in Brussels and Barcelona. In addition to the marathon, he has a half marathon best of 1:00:06 hours.

== Career ==
Matebo grew up in Kenya's Trans-Nzoia District and took up running at school as one of his teachers urged him to try to make a career out of the sport. He ran for Kenya at the 2005 Eastern Africa Youth Championships and won the Tegla Loroupe Peace Race in 2006, beating the more experienced Wilson Kipsang. In 2007 he was selected for the African Junior Athletics Championships, but withdrew from the competitions amid rumours of offers to compete for Qatar internationally.

At the 2008 Kenyan Cross Country Championships he outran Mathew Kisorio to win the junior title. His global debut at the 2008 IAAF World Cross Country Championships saw him finish in tenth place (the fifth Kenyan finisher). He ran on the European track and field circuit for the first time that year: he set a 5000 metres personal best of 13:03.04 minutes as runner-up at the KBC Night of Athletics, came third at the British Grand Prix, and was runner-up at the Rieti Meeting with a 3000 metres best of 7:33.01 minutes. He also won at the Shanghai Golden Grand Prix.

The 2009 season was a setback for Matebo as he finished down the field at the Lotto Cross Cup de Hannut and the Itálica Cross Country races, then managed only twelfth place at the Athletissima and Bislett Games track meetings. He gradually moved into road running events in 2010. At the start of the year he finished eighth at the Discovery Half Marathon in Kenya and was fourth at the 20 van Alphen in the Netherlands. He won the Brussels Marathon on his debut over the distance, running a time of 2:13:30 hours, and improved at November's La Rochelle Marathon with a run of 2:12:06 hours for sixth. He also won the Tegla Loroupe Peace Race for a second time that month.

He established himself as one of the world's best road runners the following season, later reflecting that "the whole of 2011 was definitely a wonderful year for me". He was third a half marathon in Barcelona in a personal best of 62:28 minutes. He significantly improved his best at the Barcelona Marathon in March, winning the race in a time of 2:07:31 hours. He won the Nice Half Marathon (his first over that distance) in a new best of 60:06 minutes Matebo ran the sixth fastest ever 25 km race (1:12:46 hours) in a runner-up finish to Mathew Kisorio at the BIG 25 Berlin. He was among the lesser-known runners to enter the Frankfurt Marathon, but proved his talent by coming in as the runner-up in a time of 2:05:16 hours, only finishing behind Wilson Kipsang who nearly broke the world record. This time made him the fifth fastest runner that year and the fastest not to win their race. He came eighth at the RAK Half Marathon the following January, but fared better in his first World Marathon Major at the 2012 Boston Marathon, where he was a late leader until he slowed in the heat to eventually finish second to Wesley Korir.

He was about to win 21. Ljubljana Marathon (2016) and set new course record but was misled by official TV-car (2 km before the finish line) and finished as 3rd at 2:09:37.
