= Scott Bauhs =

American long-distance runner

Personal information
- Nationality: American
- Born: May 11, 1986 (age 40) Denver, Colorado
- Height: 5 ft 11 in (1.80 m)

Sport
- Country: United States
- Sport: track and field, long-distance running, cross country
- Event(s): marathon, half marathon, 10,000 meters, 5000 meters
- College team: Chico State Wildcats
- Club: Mammoth Track Club
- Turned pro: Jan. 2009
- Coached by: Terrence Mahon

Achievements and titles
- World finals: 2011; 10,000 m, 14th
- Personal bests: 1500 m: 3:41.34 (Chico 2009); Mile: 3:59.81 (Chico 2008); 3000 m: 7:50.27 (Liège 2010); 5000 m: 13:28.40 (Los Angeles 2012); 10,000 m: 27:48.06 (Palo Alto 2008); Half marathon: 61:30 (Houston 2012); Marathon: 2:23:02 (Los Angeles 2016)

Scott Bauhs (born May 11, 1986) is an American professional distance runner sponsored by Asics and runs for Asics Aggies. He is a former Chico State runner for NCAA Division II athletics. He is the youngest American to complete both the four-minute mile and the 28-minute 10,000-meter run.

He ran a half marathon best of 1:01:30 hours at the 2012 Houston Marathon, placing third overall.

Bauhs has a high school level, cross country race named after him. The Scott Bauhs Invitational is held in Pleasanton, California and was first started in 2006. The course is 3 miles with 90% hard-packed dirt. A few small inclines, with none over 150 metres. Luis Luna of (Piner High School) set the men's course record of 14:44 minutes in 2011, while Jena Pianin (Amador Valley High School) has the women's record of 17:38 minutes from 2012.

== Competition record ==
Year	Competition	Venue	Position	Event	Time	Notes
Representing the United States
2008	World Cross Country Championships	Edinburgh, Scotland	51st	12 km	37:15	
2009	World Half Marathon Championships	Birmingham, England	69th	Half marathon	1:06:07	
2010	World Cross Country Championships	Bydgoszcz, Poland	51st	12 km	35:14	
2011	World Championships	Daegu, South Korea	14th	10,000 m	29:03.92	
2016	World Half Marathon Championships	Cardiff, Wales	32nd	Half marathon	1:04:34	

=== USA National Championships ===
==== Outdoor Track and Field ====
Year	Competition	Venue	Position	Event	Time	Notes
Representing the United States
2007	USA Outdoor Championships	Indianapolis, Indiana	18th	5000 m	13:59.42	
2008	US Olympic Trials	Eugene, Oregon	16th	10,000 m	28:54.32	
2009	USA Outdoor Championships	Eugene, Oregon	DNF	10,000 m	—	
2009	USA Outdoor Championships	Eugene, Oregon	10th	5000 m	13:39.06	
2010	USA Outdoor Championships	Des Moines, Iowa	13th	10,000 m	29:51.91	

==== Indoor Track and Field ====
Year	Competition	Venue	Position	Event	Time	Notes
Representing the United States
2010	USA Indoor Championships	Albuquerque, New Mexico	4th	3000 m	8:15.76	

==== Cross Country ====
Year	Competition	Venue	Position	Event	Time	Notes
Representing the United States
2008	USA Cross Country Championships	San Diego, California	10th	12 km	36:16	
2010	USA Cross Country Championships	Spokane, Washington	3rd	12 km	35:01	

==== Road Running ====
Year	Competition	Venue	Position	Event	Time	Notes
Representing the United States
2009	USA 20 km Championships	New Haven, Connecticut	5th	20 km	59:46	

=== NCAA championships ===
==== Outdoor Track and Field ====
Year	Competition	Venue	Position	Event	Time	Notes
Representing Chico State
2006	NCAA Div II Outdoor Championships	Emporia, Kansas	6th	10,000 m	30:36.18	
2007	NCAA Div II Outdoor Championships	Charlotte, North Carolina	1st	10,000 m	29:31.93	
2007	NCAA Div II Outdoor Championships	Charlotte, North Carolina	2nd	5000 m	14:08.32	
2008	NCAA Div II Outdoor Championships	Walnut, California	1st	5000 m	14:00.65	

==== Cross Country ====
Year	Competition	Venue	Position	Event	Time	Notes
Representing Chico State
2004	NCAA Div II Cross Country Championships	Evansville, Indiana	24th	10 km	33:03.9	
2005	NCAA Div II Cross Country Championships	Pomona, California	29th	10 km	32:39.3	
2006	NCAA Div II Cross Country Championships	Pensacola, Florida	3rd	10 km	29:24.5	
2008	NCAA Div II Cross Country Championships	Slippery Rock, Pennsylvania	1st	10 km	30:23.0	

== Running career ==
=== High school ===
While running for San Ramon Valley High School, Bauhs improved every year. As he improved, he had the smaller Division I schools recruiting him in his junior year. He signed with Chico State, but at the end of his senior season, after he finished second at the CIF California State Meet in the 3200 meters, there were much bigger schools such as Oregon that were interested.

=== Collegiate ===
Bauhs decided to stay at Chico, and there he became one of the most successful Division 2 collegiate athletes in history. He amassed eight All-Americans honors. He also won three national titles.

During the 2007 track season, Bauhs beat Nicodemus Naimadu of Abilene Christian to win the 10k title. Naimadu was previously undefeated. Later on, Bauhs broke the four-minute-mile barrier, and American Age Group Records in the half-marathon. He also broke the NCAA Division II American records in the 5k and 10k. During his time at Chico, Bauhs ran under coach Gary Towne.

== Achievements ==
- 2007 Chiba Ekiden Team USA Member
- 2008 World Cross Country Team USA Member
- 2009 World Half Marathon Team USA Member
- 2010 World Cross Country Team USA Member
- 2007 NCAA DII 10,000 m Champion
- 2007 NCAA DII 5,000 m Runner-up
- 2008 NCAA DII 5,000 m Champion
- 2008 NCAA DII Cross Country Champion
- 2008 US Club Cross Country National Champion
- 2010 US Cross Country Championships 3rd place
- 2010 US Indoor Championships 4th place 3000 m
- NCAA DII 10,000 m Record
- 2008 USTFCCCA NCAA DII Track & Field Athlete of the Year
- 2007-2008 CCAA Athlete of the Year
- 2006-2009 Chico State Athlete of the Year
- 4-time USTFCCCA All-American NCAA DII Cross Country
- 4-time USTFCCCA All-American NCAA DII Track & Field
- 21 and under US age group record in half marathon
- 2nd 2003 California State track & field championships 3200 m
- Finished 6th in the 2010 Bay to Breakers 12k run
- Finished 51st in the 2008 IAAF World Cross Country Championships
- #4 on 2008 USA list for 10,000 m
- #4 best American in 10,000 m collegiate history
- 3rd at the USA Track and Field Championships 10,000m 2011
- Finished #14 at the 2011 Daegu IAAF World Championships (3rd American)
- Boy Scouts of America Eagle Scout

== Personal bests ==
- 1500 meters – 3:41.34 (2009)
- Mile – 3:59.81 (2008)
- 3000 meters – 7:50.27 (2010)
- 5000 meters – 13:28.40 (2012)
- 10,000 meters – 27:48.06 (2008)
- 5 km – 13:37 (2008)
- 10 km – 28:30 relay leg (2007)
- Half marathon – 1:01:30 (2012)
- Marathon – 2:23:02 (2016)
