= Hunegnaw Mesfin =

Ethiopian long-distance runner (born 1989)

Hunegnaw Mesfin (born 31 January 1989) is an Ethiopian professional long-distance runner who competes in cross country and track running events. He has represented his country at the IAAF World Cross Country Championships and won medals in the senior and junior team categories.

Mesfin won his first major medal at the 2007 African Junior Championships in Athletics, taking the 10,000 metres silver medal behind Kenya's Mathew Kisorio. His first year of global competition came in 2008. He was eleventh in the junior race at the 2008 IAAF World Cross Country Championships – a performance which helped Ethiopia to the team silver medals. He just missed out on a medal at the 2008 World Junior Championships in Athletics, finishing fourth behind fellow Ethiopian Ibrahim Jeilan. He competed for Ethiopia at the International Chiba Ekiden and won his race stage, helping the national team to the title. He ended the year with a third-place finish at the inaugural Bahir Dar Cross Country.

Mesfin started 2009 with a win at the Sululta Cross Country in the junior section. He competed as a senior at the 2009 IAAF World Cross Country Championships, however, and his tenth-place performance brought the Ethiopian men second place in the team rankings. He began to compete on the senior European cross country circuit at the end of that year and took a significant victory at the Cross Internacional Zornotza in January 2010, coming out on top of a photo finish with Gebre Gebremariam, the reigning world champion. He celebrated his 21st birthday with a second high-profile victory, this time at the Cinque Mulini. In spite of these performances, he failed to match his placing of the previous year at the 2010 IAAF World Cross Country Championships, where he ended the race in the nineteenth place as Ethiopia took the bronze behind Kenya and Eritrea.

He gave a strong performance at the Jan Meda Cross Country in February 2011, surprising the more established Imane Merga with a burst of speed to win his first national senior title. However, it was his compatriot who took the title at the 2011 IAAF World Cross Country Championships while Mesfin faded in the latter stages and came eighth, although he and Imane led the Ethiopian's to second in the team rankings. He began to compete on the European road circuit that year and was third at the Giro Media Blenio 10K in April, setting a time of 28:33 minutes. He ran a 5000 m personal best of 13:38.92 minutes at the Athletissima meet in June and made his debut over the half marathon at the Udine Half Marathon, coming sixth in a time of 1:02:00 hours.

At the Cross Zornotza in 2012 he took third place.

His 2011/2012 cross country season began with a third-place finish at the Cross de Atapuerca.
