= Nice Half Marathon =

French half marathon

- Date: April
- Location: Nice
- Event type: Road
- Distance: Half marathon, 10K run
- Established: 1992
- Course records: Men: Bernard Koech (KEN) 59:57; Women: Isabella Ochichi (KEN) 1:08:42
- Website: Semi-marathon de Nice

The Nice Half Marathon (French: Semi-marathon international de Nice) is an annual road running competition over the half marathon distance (21.1 km) held in April in the city of Nice, France. It is organised by the Azur Sport Organisation, who hold several races in the region, including the annual French Riviera Marathon.

The men's course record is held by Bernard Kiprop Koech of Kenya, who at 59:57 minutes is the only man to win the race in under an hour. The women's record of 1:08:42 dates back to 2003, when Olympic medallist Isabella Ochichi won the race.

Launched in 1992, the race reached an international standard around 1995, which coincided with an increase in the number of East African runners entering (and winning) the race. Since 1995 only two non-Kenyans have won the men's race. The most successful athlete of the competition's history is Alina Gherasim of Romania, who took three straight wins from 1997 to 1999. No man has ever won the Nice Half Marathon multiple times.

== Past winners ==
Key: Course record

Edition	Year	Men's winner	Time (h:m:s)	Women's winner	Time (h:m:s)
1st	1992	Chaham El Maati (MAR)	1:05:00	?	?
2nd	1993	Saïd Belaout (ALG)	1:05:28	Sylviane Levesque (FRA)	1:14:32
3rd	1994	Mustapha Lachaal (MAR)	1:04:22	Nadezhda Tatarenkova (RUS)	1:13:00
4th	1995	Josephat Kiprono (KEN)	1:01:51	Souad Dria (FRA)	1:13:57
5th	1996	Ezequiel Bitok (KEN)	1:01:45	Christine Mallo (FRA)	1:12:54
6th	1997	Paul Kipsambu (KEN)	1:01:58	Alina Gherasim (ROM)	1:09:41
7th	1998	Francis Kemboi (KEN)	1:02:13	Alina Gherasim (ROM)	1:10:21
8th	1999	Geoffrey Kinyua (KEN)	1:01:52	Alina Gherasim (ROM)	1:11:23
9th	2000	Phaustin Baha Sulle (TAN)	1:01:27	Restituta Joseph (TAN)	1:08:47
10th	2001	Peter Kiplagat (KEN)	1:01:32	Edith Masai (KEN)	1:07:53
11th	2002	Laban Kipkemboi (KEN)	1:03:33	Hafida Gadi (FRA)	1:10:11
12th	2003	Benjamin Pseret (KEN)	1:02:38	Isabella Ochichi (KEN)	1:08:42
13th	2004	Julius Rotich (KEN)	1:01:27	Margaret Atodonyang (KEN)	1:11:34
14th	2005	Benson Barus (KEN)	1:01:14	Irina Permitina (RUS)	1:12:20
15th	2006	Emmanuel Mutai (KEN)	1:01:24	Sylvia Kibet (KEN)	1:11:51
16th	2007	Isaac Sang (KEN)	1:02:04	Anne Bererwe (KEN)	1:13:13
17th	2008	Dennis Ndiso (KEN)	1:00:54	Atsede Habtamu (ETH)	1:10:49
18th	2009	Titus Masai (KEN)	1:00:00	Helah Kiprop (KEN)	1:09:29
19th	2010	Peter Some (KEN)	1:01:34	Belaynesh Algera (ETH)	1:11:10
20th	2011	Levy Omari (KEN)	1:00:06	Feyse Tadese (ETH)	1:11:08
21st	2012	Bernard Koech (KEN)	59:57	Guteni Shone (ETH)	1:11:11
22nd	2013	Dino Sefir (ETH)	1:00:30	Elvan Abeylegesse (ETH)	1:10:32
23rd	2014	Kennedy Kipyego (KEN)	1:01:31	Janet Kisa (KEN)	1:11:01
24th	2015	James Gitahi (KEN)	1:00:12	Edna Kimaiyo (KEN)	1:10:47
25th	2016	Kennedy Kipyego (KEN)	1:01:46	Muliye Dekebo (ETH)	1:11:08
26th	2017	John Kipkoech (KEN)	1:02:19	Amandine Ginouves (FRA)	1:27:07
27th	2018	Emmanuel Kipsang (KEN)	1:01:04	Anna Wąsik (POL)	1:22:04
