= Brahim Chettah =

Algerian long-distance runner

Personal information
- Born: 14 October 1980 (age 46)

Sport
- Sport: Long-distance running

Brahim Chettah (born 14 October 1980) is an Algerian long-distance runner.

He finished sixth in the half marathon at the 2003 Summer Universiade. At the 2005 Summer Universiade he finished seventh in the 10,000 metres and tenth in the half marathon. He also competed at the World Cross Country Championships in 2005 and 2008.
