= Peter Kimeli Some =

Kenyan long-distance runner

Peter Kimeli Some (born 5 June 1990) is a Kenyan long-distance runner who competes in road running events, including the marathon. Some has a marathon best of 2:05:38 hours and a half marathon best of 1:00:21 hours. He won the 2013 Paris Marathon and the 2012 Brighton Marathon. He is the son of former runner Some Muge and the brother of Matthew Kisorio.

== Career ==
Some grew up in a family with a strong history of athletics: his father Some Muge was Kenya's first ever medallist at the IAAF World Cross Country Championships. He followed in his father's footsteps in distance running, as did his older brother Matthew Kisorio and younger brother Nicholas Kipchirchir Togom. Some made his international debut in 2008 at the age of seventeen and won his first medal by coming eighth in the junior race of the 2008 IAAF World Cross Country Championships, helping Kenya to the junior team title alongside his brother Kisorio. The following year he set a 10,000 metres track best of 28:10.8 minutes and took the bronze medal in that event at the 2009 African Junior Athletics Championships.

From the 2010 season onwards he transitioned towards longer road races. In his first road race outside Kenya, and his half marathon debut, he took the title at the Roma-Ostia Half Marathon. Two months after he won the Nice Half Marathon with a run of 1:01:34 hours. In September he equalled that time for a fourth-place finish at the Philadelphia Distance Run (a race won by his older brother). A debut over the full marathon distance followed a month later at the Venice Marathon and he finished eighth but was some distance behind the winner with his time of 2:15:17 hours. He had two outings over that distance in 2011: he came third at the Maratona di Sant'Antonio in Padua with a best of 2:10:16 hours and placed fourth at the Košice Peace Marathon.

Some's first marathon victory came in 2012 at the Brighton Marathon, where he beat the previous course record by over four minutes with his run of 2:12:03 hours. Controversy struck his family that year as his brother Matthew Kisorio tested positive for steroids at the national championships and Kisorio admitted to doping, saying that doctors systemically doped athletes in the country. Some were unaffected by the situation and in October he improved his marathon best by three and a half minutes at the high-profile Frankfurt Marathon, coming in fourth place.

He began 2013 in strong form, winning the Discovery Half Marathon in Eldoret, then improving his best to 1:00:21 at the Lisbon Half Marathon, where he was second to Bernard Koech. These served as his build-up to the Paris Marathon and he surprised the field by surging ahead of race favourite Tadese Tola and taking the title with a significant personal best of 2:05:38 hours.

== Marathon performances ==
- 2010 Venice Marathon 2:15:17 (8th)
- 2011 Maratona di Sant'Antonio 2:10:16 (3rd)
- 2011 Košice Peace Marathon 2:13:56 (4th)
- 2012 Brighton Marathon 2:12:03 (1st)
- 2012 Frankfurt Marathon 2:08:33 (4th)
- 2013 Paris Marathon 2:05:38 (1st)
- 2013 IAAF World Championships 2:11:47 (9th)
- 2014 Tokyo Marathon 2:07:05 (5th)
- 2014 Toronto Waterfront Marathon 2:10:07 (6th)
- 2015 Tokyo Marathon 2:07:22 (5th)
- 2015 Toronto Waterfront Marathon 2:15:21 (10th)
- 2016 Seoul International Marathon 2:10:01 (8th)
- 2016 Gold Coast Marathon 2:15:09 (7th)
- 2017 Daegu Marathon 2:09:22 (2nd)
- 2017 Shenzhen Marathon 2:14:49 (1st)
- 2018 Daegu Marathon 2:06:49 (3rd)
- 2018 Ljubljana Marathon 2:12:57 (6th)

Source:World Athletics profile below.
