= Irene Chepet Cheptai =

Kenyan long-distance runner

Irene Cheptai
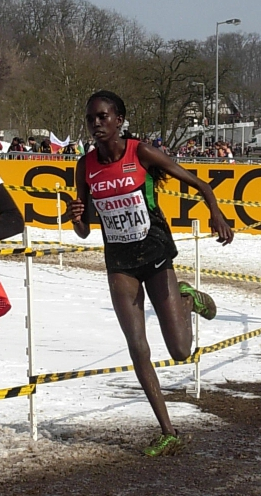
- Cheptai at the 2013 IAAF World Cross Country Championships

Personal information
- Full name: Irene Chepet Cheptai
- Nationality: Kenyan
- Born: 4 February 1992 (age 34)

Sport
- Country: Kenya
- Sport: Athletics
- Events: Middle-, Long-distance running
Medal record
Women's athletics
Representing Kenya
Commonwealth Games
Silver medal – second place	2022 Birmingham	10,000 m
World Cross Country Championships
Gold medal – first place	2017 Kampala	Senior race
Gold medal – first place	2017 Kampala	Senior team
Gold medal – first place	2013 Bydgoszcz	Senior team
Silver medal – second place	2008 Edinburgh	Junior race
Silver medal – second place	2008 Edinburgh	Junior team
Silver medal – second place	2015 Qingzhen	Senior team
World Marathon Majors
Bronze medal – third place	2024 Chicago	Marathon

Irene Chepet Cheptai (born 4 February 1992) is a Kenyan professional long-distance runner who competes in track and cross country running. She was the gold medallist at the 2017 World Cross Country Championships and led Kenya to the team title. Cheptai won the silver medal for the 10,000 metres at the 2022 Commonwealth Games.

Prior to that she was a junior silver medallist at the 2008 World Cross Country Championships and represented Kenya in the senior race in 2013 and 2015, winning team medals both times.

== Career ==
Irene Chepet Cheptai made her international debut at the 2007 World Youth Championships in Athletics, where she ran a personal best of 9:22.05 minutes to place seventh overall in the 3000 metres. The following year she established herself internationally on grass by taking the silver medal in the junior race at the 2008 IAAF World Cross Country Championships, losing only to Ethiopia's Genzebe Dibaba in a sprint finish. She did not compete at a high level for several years after that and marked her entrance into the senior ranks with a seventh-place finish in the 5000 metres at the 2012 Kenyan Athletics Championships.

Cheptai began to make an impact at senior level in the 2013 season, starting with a runner-up finish at the Cross Internacional de Itálica and third place at the Cross Internacional Juan Muguerza. Second place to Margaret Muriuki at the Kenya Cross Country Championships brought on her selection for the senior national team, and finished tenth at the 2013 IAAF World Cross Country Championships (although only fifth best among the winning Kenyan team). She competed on the IAAF Diamond League track circuit for the first time that year and managed personal bests of 8:56.20 minutes and 14:50.99 minutes for the 3000 m and 5000 m respectively.

The 2014 season was a step back on the track for Cheptai, as she finished lowly in Diamond League races and failed to improve her bests. She did make progress in road running, however, coming second at the Groningen Four-Mile Run and Nairobi Diamond 10K Run, setting a best of 31:45 minutes at the latter. She began training with Turkish athletics club Üsküdar Belediyesi and brought the club victory in the individual and team categories at the European Champion Clubs Cup Cross Country. After winning the Discovery Kenya Cross Country, Cheptai was again selected for the Kenyan team for the 2015 IAAF World Cross Country Championships and reached a new high in seventh place, winning the team silver medal with Kenya. On the 2015 IAAF Diamond League circuit, she placed in the top six of the 5000 m at the Shanghai Golden Grand Prix, Prefontaine Classic and Bislett Games. A runner-up finish to Viola Kibiwott at the 2015 Athletics Kenya World Championship Trials earned her a place on her first senior track team for Kenya.

From the beginning of 2016, she started her collaboration with the Italian Coach Renato Canova, and during the season she achieved PB in both the 5000m (14:43.42) and 10,000m (31:15.38).

She won her first national title at the 2017 Kenyan Cross Country Championships.

At the 2017 IAAF World Cross Country Championships Cheptai won individual and team gold, in a historic event in which Kenya secured the top six positions in the senior women's race.

== Personal bests ==
- 1500 metres – 4:13.75 (Kortrijk 2014)
- 3000 metres – 8:48.03 (Zürich 2015)
- 5000 metres – 14:43.42 (Eugene, OR 2016)
- 10000 metres - 30:44.00 (Tokyo 2021)

Road

- 10 kilometres – 30:16 (Prague 2022)
- Half marathon – 1:06:42 (New Delhi 2022)

== International competitions ==
Representing Kenya
Year	Competition	Venue	Position	Event	Result
2007	World Youth Championships	Ostrava, Czech Republic	7th	3000 m	9:22.05
2008	World Cross Country Championships	Edinburgh, United Kingdom	2nd	Junior race	20:04
2008	World Cross Country Championships	Edinburgh, United Kingdom	2nd	Junior team	20 pts
2013	World Cross Country Championships	Bydgoszcz, Poland	10th	Senior race	25:01
2013	World Cross Country Championships	Bydgoszcz, Poland	1st	Senior team	19 pts
2015	European Champion Clubs Cup Cross Country	Guadalajara, Spain	1st	Senior race	20:43
2015	World Cross Country Championships	Qingzhen, China	7th	Senior race	26:26
2015	World Cross Country Championships	Qingzhen, China	2nd	Senior team	19 pts
2015	World Championships	Beijing, China	7th	5000 m	15:03.41
2017	World Cross Country Championships	Kampala, Uganda	1st	Senior race	31:57
2017	World Cross Country Championships	Kampala, Uganda	1st	Senior team	10 pts
2017	World Championships	London, United Kingdom	7th	10,000 m	31:21.11
2021	Olympic Games	Tokyo, Japan	6th	10,000 m	30:44.00
2022	Commonwealth Games	Birmingham, United Kingdom	2nd	10,000 m	30:49.52
2025	Boston Marathon	Boston, Massachusetts	4th	42km	2:21:32

== National titles ==
- Kenyan Cross Country Championships
  - Senior race: 2017

== Notes ==
The athlete's name may also be rendered as Irine Chebet Cheptai.
