= Mestawet Tufa =

Ethiopian long-distance runner

Mestawet Tufa (Amharic: መስታወት ቱፋ; born 14 September 1983 in Arsi) is an Ethiopian long-distance runner. She was the winner of the women's 10,000 metres at the 2007 All-Africa Games and the runner up in the senior women's race at the 2008 World Cross Country Championships.

== Career ==
She competed at the Olympic Games, but did not finish her 10,000 metres race.

Tufa equaled the 15 Kilometres road running African record of 46:57 minutes in Nijmegen in November 2008. Elana Meyer had run the same time in 1991.

She competed in her first mountain race at the Obudu Ranch International Mountain Race in Nigeria. She ran strongly, leading the race until the last 400 m. However, she failed to finish as she collapsed 50 m from the finish line due to severe dehydration and was treated by a medical team. She returned to the race the following year and finished as runner-up, just one second behind the winner Mamitu Daska.

She took third place at the Dam tot Damloop 10-mile run in September 2010, finishing with a time of 52:43.

Mestawet set a course record of 1:10:03 to win the 2013 Gifu Seiryu Half Marathon.

== Achievements ==
Year	Competition	Venue	Position	Event	Notes
Representing Ethiopia
2000	World Junior Championships	Santiago, Chile	5th	3000 m	9:16.73
2001	World Youth Championships	Debrecen, Hungary	2nd	3000 m	9:11.60
2006	World Cross Country Championships	Fukuoka, Japan	7th	Long race (8 km)	25:59
2006	World Cross Country Championships	Fukuoka, Japan	1st	Team competition	16 pts
2006	World Athletics Final	Stuttgart, Germany	8th	5000 m	16:09.29
2007	All-Africa Games	Algiers, Algeria	1st	10,000 m	31:26.05
2008	World Cross Country Championships	Edinburgh, Scotland	2nd	Senior Race (7.905 km)	25:15
2008	World Cross Country Championships	Edinburgh, Scotland	1st	Team competition	18 pts
2009	World Half Marathon Championships	Birmingham, England	5th	Half marathon	1:09:11
2009	World Half Marathon Championships	Birmingham, England	2nd	Team competition	3:26:14

=== Personal bests ===
- 3000 metres - 8:47.41 (2006)
- 5000 metres - 14:51.72 (2007)
- 10,000 metres - 30:38.33 (2008)
- Half marathon - 1:09:11 (2009)

Sporting positions
Preceded by (South Africa) Irvette van Blerk (Ethiopia) Berhane Adere (Ethiopia) Bezunesh Bekele	Zevenheuvelenloop Women's Winner (15km); 2003; 2006; 2008	Succeeded by (Kenya) Lydia Cheromei (Ethiopia) Bezunesh Bekele (Ethiopia) Tirunesh Dibaba
