= Delvine Relin Meringor =

Romanian athlete

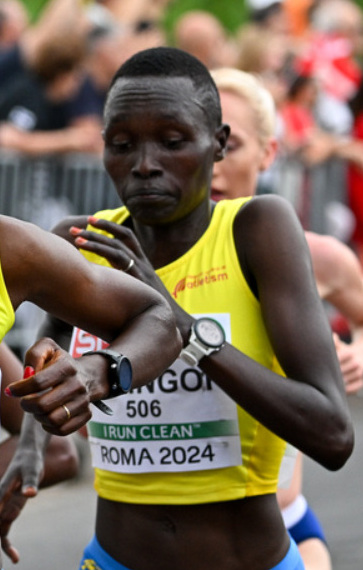
- Meringor at the 2024 European Championships

Personal information
- Nationality: Romanian
- Born: 1 August 1992 (age 34) Kapsangar, Kenya
- Height: 1.62 m (5 ft 4 in)

Sport
- Sport: Athletics
- Event: Long distance running

Achievements and titles
- Personal bests: Marathon: 2:24:32 (2021); Half marathon: 1:07:48 (2021)

Delvine Relin Meringor (born 1 August 1992) is a Kenyan-born Romanian long-distance runner.

Meringor is currently serving a three-year competition ban set to end in January 2028 for an anti-doping rule violation.

== Career ==
=== Representing Kenya ===
Meringor finished fourth in Edinburgh, Scotland at the 2008 IAAF World Cross Country Championships in the Junior women's race, winning a silver medal in the team event. In 2018, she won the Safaricom-Madoka Half Marathon held in Taita Taveta County.

=== Representing Romania ===
In May 2021, she was given Romanian citizenship in May 2021 along with Joan Chelimo Melly and Stella Rutto. All three trained under the Romanian coach Carol Şanta, who worked professionally in Kenya for over 11 years, and were registered members at the Steaua Bucharest Army Sports Club since 2019.

In April 2022, she won Romanian national titles in the 5000 metres and 10,000 metres at the Tudor Vladimirescu Municipal Stadium, Târgu Jiu.

In 2022 she also won the women's Los Angeles Marathon.

Although Meringor placed in significant positions in a number of races from 2022 to 2024 including third in the 2023 Barcelona Marathon, and seventh in the marathon at the 2024 Summer Olympics in Paris, all of her results were later disqualified due to an anti-doping rule violations issued in 2025 backdated to 2022.

=== Doping ban ===
In January 2025, Meringor admitted to the use of a prohibited method after irregularities were identified in her athlete biological passport. The Anti-Doping Agency of Kenya sanctioned her with a three-year period ineligibility from January 2025 to January 2028 along with the disqualification of all her results from 7 October 2022.
