= Diana Sigei Chepkemoi =

Kenyan long-distance runner

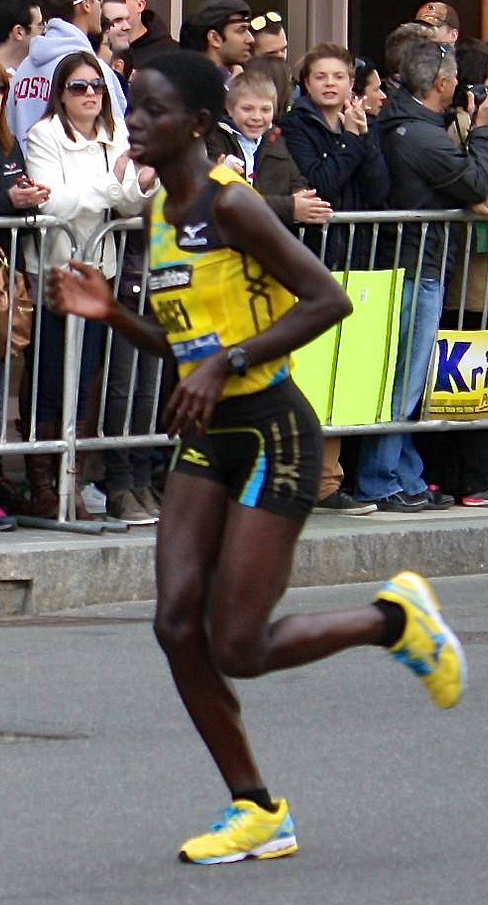

Personal information
- Nationality: Kenyan
- Born: 14 October 1987 (age 38) Kenya
- Spouse: Henry Kipsang
- Children: one son
Medal record
Women's athletics
Representing Kenya
World Cross Country Championships
| Silver medal – second place | 2023 Bathurst | Junior team |
African Championships
| Gold medal – first place | 2026 Accra | 3000 metres steeplechase |

Diana Sigei Chepkemoi (born 14 October 1987) is a Kenyan long-distance runner who competes in marathons and half marathons.

Chepkemoi was born in Kenya in 1987. Her husband Henry and his brother, Salim Kipsang, are both runners. She and her husband have a son and they live at Eldoret. Her coach is the retired Kenyan runner Patrick Sang and she is the only woman who trains in a group at Kaptagat near the Great Rift Valley in Kenya.

== Career ==
In 2010, she took three first places at various distances in Austria, France and the Netherlands. Chepkemoi came to further notice when she won sixth place at the Dubai Marathon and fourth place in the Toronto Marathon in 2011. She took second place in Amsterdam over ten miles in a time of 52:46, and second in Berlin over 25 kilometres.

In 2012, she was the runner up in both the Lisbon and Lille Half Marathons. She finished fourth in the Amsterdam Marathon and fifth in the Boston Marathon on a very hot day. In 2013, she was runner up in the Jakarta Marathon and she won the Lille half marathon.
