= Aya Manome =

Japanese long-distance runner

Aya Manome (馬目 綾, Manome Aya; born August 30, 1982) is a Japanese long distance track, and road running athlete.

On September 10, 2006, Manome finished third at the Rotterdam Half Marathon in Rotterdam, The Netherlands. Her time of 1:12:50 was 2:14 behind winner Mara Yamauchi. Manome also finished third in the 2007 Great Scottish Run half marathon.
