= Emebt Etea =

Ethiopian long-distance runner

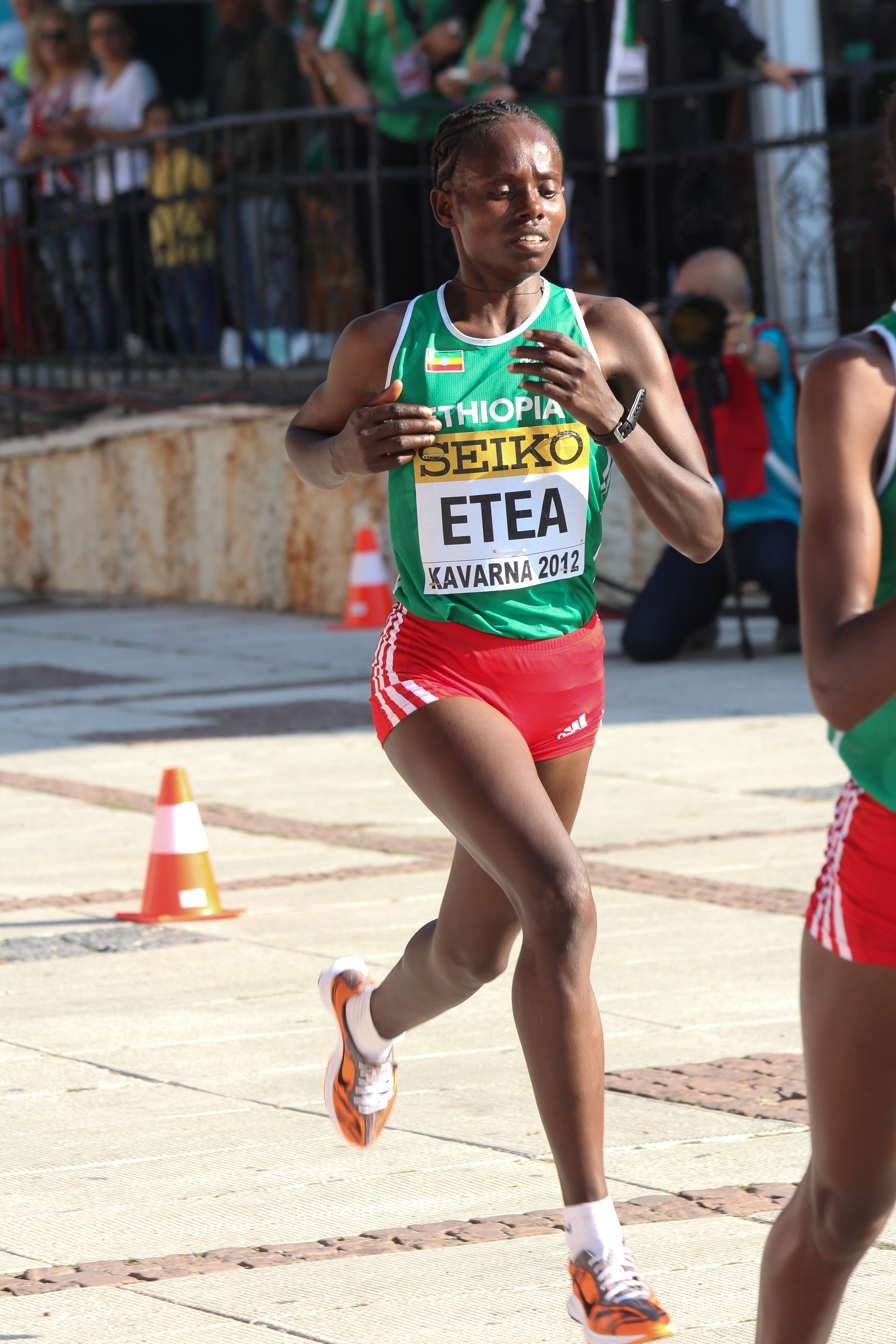
Emebt Etea of Ethiopia at the 2012 World Half Marathon Championships in Kavarna, Bulgaria

Emebt Etea Bedada (born 11 January 1990 in Waliso) is an Ethiopian long-distance runner who competes in road running competitions. She emerged quickly as a junior (under-19) runner with an African Junior Championships double in the 1500 metres and the 3000 metres. She was a junior bronze medalist at the IAAF World Cross Country Championships in 2008.

She moved away from middle-distances in 2009 and began competing in half marathons and marathons. She won marathons in Brescia and Venice in 2012. She also won the team gold in the 2012 IAAF World Half Marathon Championships with the Ethiopian women's team. Her marathon best is 2:25:53 hours.

Her younger sister Korahubsh Itaa was the 2009 World Youth Champion in the steeplechase and broke the world youth best for the 2000 m distance.

== Career ==
Emebt's first international races for Ethiopia came when she was fifteen. She was runner-up in the 5000 metres at the East African Championships and was the 1500 m bronze medallist at the 2005 African Junior Athletics Championships. She placed seventh in the junior race at the 2006 IAAF World Cross Country Championships and finished fourth at the 2006 World Junior Championships. She also came sixth at that year's Great Ethiopian Run.

At the 2007 IAAF World Cross Country Championships she finished 19th in the junior race after miscalculating the number of laps left and later had to be stretchered off the course due to heat exhaustion in the torrid Mombasa weather. She fared better on the track that year: she won both the 1500 m and 3000 metres titles at the 2007 African Junior Athletics Championships and improved her bests to 4:08.50 minutes and 8:57.29 for those events that year, respectively. She was runner-up at the end-of-year BOClassic race in Italy, second only to Sylvia Kibet.

She took the national junior title in cross country in 2008 then won the bronze medal in the junior race at the 2008 World Cross Country Championships. She also ran in her first senior level event, coming seventh at the 2008 African Championships. In her first year as a senior athlete in 2009 she began to make appearances on the European track and field circuit and improved her 3000 m best to 8:49.28 minutes. Having failed to improve upon her 1500 m performances as a young teenager, she turned her talents towards the longer distances. In her debut over the half marathon she delivered a fast performance of 70:54 minutes to win the 2009 Turin Half Marathon and she was fourth at the Marseille-Cassis Classique Internationale 20K race.

Emebt's debut over the marathon distance proved to be relatively low key as she came tenth at the 2010 Vienna City Marathon with a time of 2:36:29 hours. She did better at other races the following year, however, winning the Brescia Marathon with a personal best of 2:34:43, taking fourth place at the Milan Marathon, then having her second career win at the Venice Marathon. She also performed well in her road debut for Ethiopia, coming fifth and taking the team gold medal at the 2012 World Half Marathon Championships.

She opened 2013 with a win at the San Blas Half Marathon and a strong performance at the Seoul International Marathon, placing second to Flomena Chepchirchir with a time of 2:25:53 – an improvement of nearly nine minutes.
