= Hirotaka Tamura =

Hirotaka Tamura is an electrical engineer at Fujitsu Laboratories Ltd. in Kawasaki, Japan. He was named a Fellow of the Institute of Electrical and Electronics Engineers (IEEE) in 2013 for his contributions to technology for high speed interconnects.
