= 2008 IAAF World Cross Country Championships =

Coordinates: 55°57′06″N 3°10′05″W

- Organisers: IAAF
- Edition: 36th
- Date: 30 March
- Host city: Edinburgh, United Kingdom
- Venue: Holyrood Park
- Events: 4
- Distances: 12 km – Senior men 7.905 km – Junior men 7.905 km – Senior women 6.04 km – Junior women
- Participation: 448 athletes from 57 nations

The 2008 IAAF World Cross Country Championships took place on 30 March 2008. The races were held at the Holyrood Park in Edinburgh, United Kingdom. Four races took place, one for men, women, junior men and junior women respectively. All races encompassed both individual and team competition. This was the year in which Kenenisa Bekele became the first athlete in World Cross history to win six individual long course titles, breaking his tie with John Ngugi and Paul Tergat who had each won five. Reports of the event were given in The New York Times, in the Herald, and for the IAAF.

== Medallists ==
Event	Gold		Silver		Bronze	
Individual
Senior men (12 km)	Kenenisa Bekele; Ethiopia	34:38	Leonard Patrick Komon; Kenya	34:41	Zersenay Tadese; Eritrea	34:43
Junior men (7.905 km)	Ibrahim Jeilan; Ethiopia	22:38	Ayele Abshero; Ethiopia	22:40	Lucas Kimeli Rotich; Kenya	22:42
Senior women (7.905 km)	Tirunesh Dibaba; Ethiopia	25:10	Mestawet Tufa; Ethiopia	25:15	Linet Chepkwemoi Masai; Kenya	25:18
Junior women (6.04 km)	Genzebe Dibaba; Ethiopia	19:59	Irine Chepet Cheptai; Kenya	20:04	Emebt Etea; Ethiopia	20:06
Team
Senior men	Kenya	39	Ethiopia	104	Qatar	143
Junior men	Kenya	21	Ethiopia	28	Uganda	37
Senior women	Ethiopia	18	Kenya	22	Australia	84
Junior women	Ethiopia	16	Kenya	20	Japan	57

== Race results ==
=== Senior men's race (12 km) ===
Complete results for senior men and for senior men's teams were published.

Individual race
Rank	Athlete	Country	Time
1st place, gold medalist(s)	Kenenisa Bekele	Ethiopia	34:38
2nd place, silver medalist(s)	Leonard Patrick Komon	Kenya	34:41
3rd place, bronze medalist(s)	Zersenay Tadese	Eritrea	34:43
4	Joseph Ebuya	Kenya	34:47
5	Moses Ndiema Masai	Kenya	35:02
6	Felix Kikwai Kibore	Qatar	35:15
7	Gideon Lekumok Ngatuny	Kenya	35:16
8	Ahmad Hassan Abdullah	Qatar	35:18
9	Habtamu Fikadu	Ethiopia	35:19
10	Bernard Kiprop Kipyego	Kenya	35:24
11	Hosea Macharinyang	Kenya	35:24
12	Augustine Kiprono Choge	Kenya	35:26
Full results

Teams
Rank	Team	Points
1st place, gold medalist(s)	Kenya: Leonard Patrick Komon / 2; Joseph Ebuya / 4; Moses Ndiema Masai / 5; Gideon Lekumok Ngatuny / 7; Bernard Kiprop Kipyego / 10; Hosea Macharinyang / 11; (Augustine Kiprono Choge) / (12); (Mark Kosgei Kiptoo) / (14); (John Kimondo Thuo) / (18)	39
2nd place, silver medalist(s)	Ethiopia: Kenenisa Bekele / 1; Habtamu Fikadu / 9; Sileshi Sihine / 15; Gebre-egziabher Gebremariam / 17; Dereje Debele / 21; Abebe Dinkesa / 41; (Zembaba Yigeze) / (57); (Solomon Tsige) / (139); (Demssew Tsega) / (DNF)	104
3rd place, bronze medalist(s)	Qatar: Felix Kikwai Kibore / 6; Ahmad Hassan Abdullah / 8; Sultan Khamis Zaman / 22; Mubarak Hassan Shami / 25; Gamal Belal Salem / 34; Essa Ismail Rashed / 48; (Ali Dawoud Sedam) / (61); (Moustafa Ahmed Shebto) / (67); (Naser Jamal Naser) / (81)	143
4	Eritrea	162
5	Morocco	195
6	Uganda	208
7	United States	296
8	Spain	348
Full results

- Note: Athletes in parentheses did not score for the team result.

=== Junior men's race (7.905 km) ===
Complete results for junior men and for junior men's teams were published.

Individual race
Rank	Athlete	Country	Time
1st place, gold medalist(s)	Ibrahim Jeilan	Ethiopia	22:38
2nd place, silver medalist(s)	Ayele Abshero	Ethiopia	22:40
3rd place, bronze medalist(s)	Lucas Kimeli Rotich	Kenya	22:42
4	Benjamin Kiplagat	Uganda	22:43
5	Titus Kipjumba Mbishei	Kenya	22:45
6	Mathew Kipkoech Kisorio	Kenya	22:51
7	Peter Kimeli Some	Kenya	22:55
8	Geofrey Kusuro	Uganda	22:56
9	Amanuel Mesel	Eritrea	23:00
10	Levy Matebo Omari	Kenya	23:03
11	Hunegnaw Mesfin	Ethiopia	23:03
12	Stephen Kiprotich	Uganda	23:09
Full results

Teams
Rank	Team	Points
1st place, gold medalist(s)	Kenya: Lucas Kimeli Rotich / 3; Titus Kipjumba Mbishei / 5; Mathew Kipkoech Kisorio / 6; Peter Kimeli Some / 7; (Levy Matebo Omari) / (10); (Charles Kibet Chepkurui) / (15)	21
2nd place, silver medalist(s)	Ethiopia: Ibrahim Jeilan / 1; Ayele Abshero / 2; Hunegnaw Mesfin / 11; Feyisa Lilesa / 14; (Dejen Gebremeskel) / (18); (Yetwale Kende) / (21)	28
3rd place, bronze medalist(s)	Uganda: Benjamin Kiplagat / 4; Geofrey Kusuro / 8; Stephen Kiprotich / 12; Abraham Kiplimo / 13; (Ben Siwa) / (22)	37
4	Japan	119
5	Morocco	136
6	United States	138
7	Canada	188
8	Algeria	200
Full results

- Note: Athletes in parentheses did not score for the team result.

=== Senior women's race (7.905 km) ===
Complete results for senior women and for senior women's teams were published.

Individual race
Rank	Athlete	Country	Time
1st place, gold medalist(s)	Tirunesh Dibaba	Ethiopia	25:10
2nd place, silver medalist(s)	Mestawet Tufa	Ethiopia	25:15
3rd place, bronze medalist(s)	Linet Chepkwemoi Masai	Kenya	25:18
4	Doris Chepkwemoi Changeywo	Kenya	25:34
5	Hilda Kibet	Netherlands	25:35
6	Gelete Burka	Ethiopia	25:35
7	Priscah Jepleting Cherono	Kenya	25:36
8	Margaret Wangari Muriuki	Kenya	25:46
9	Meselech Melkamu	Ethiopia	25:51
10	Grace Kwamboka Momanyi	Kenya	25:54
11	Benita Johnson	Australia	25:56
12	Lineth Chepkurui	Kenya	26:05
Full results

Teams
Rank	Team	Points
1st place, gold medalist(s)	Ethiopia: Tirunesh Dibaba / 1; Mestawet Tufa / 2; Gelete Burka / 6; Meselech Melkamu / 9; (Koren Jelela) / (14); (Aselefech Mergia) / (16)	18
2nd place, silver medalist(s)	Kenya: Linet Chepkwemoi Masai / 3; Doris Chepkwemoi Changeywo / 4; Priscah Jepleting Cherono / 7; Margaret Wangari Muriuki / 8; (Grace Kwamboka Momanyi) / (10); (Lineth Chepkurui) / (12)	22
3rd place, bronze medalist(s)	Australia: Benita Johnson / 11; Lisa Jane Weightman / 20; Melissa Rollison / 26; Anna Thompson / 27; (Melinda Vernon) / (41); (Victoria Mitchell) / (54)	84
4	United States	87
5	Morocco	100
6	United Kingdom	116
7	Eritrea	150
8	Portugal	165
Full results

- Note: Athletes in parentheses did not score for the team result.

=== Junior women's race (6.04 km) ===
Complete results for junior women and for junior women's teams were published.

Individual race
Rank	Athlete	Country	Time
1st place, gold medalist(s)	Genzebe Dibaba	Ethiopia	19:59
2nd place, silver medalist(s)	Irine Chepet Cheptai	Kenya	20:04
3rd place, bronze medalist(s)	Emebt Etea	Ethiopia	20:06
4	Delvine Relin Meringor	Kenya	20:06
5	Emebet Bacha	Ethiopia	20:11
6	Jackline Chebii	Kenya	20:11
7	Betelhem Moges	Ethiopia	20:13
8	Dorcas Jepchirchir Kiptarus	Kenya	20:17
9	Tigist Memuye	Ethiopia	20:27
10	Yukino Ninomiya	Japan	20:30
11	Bitaw Yehune	Ethiopia	20:33
12	Christine Kambua Muyanga	Kenya	20:34
Full results

Teams
Rank	Team	Points
1st place, gold medalist(s)	Ethiopia: Genzebe Dibaba / 1; Emebt Etea / 3; Emebet Bacha / 5; Betelhem Moges / 7; (Tigist Memuye) / (9); (Bitaw Yehune) / (11)	16
2nd place, silver medalist(s)	Kenya: Irine Chepet Cheptai / 2; Delvine Relin Meringor / 4; Jackline Chebii / 6; Dorcas Jepchirchir Kiptarus / 8; (Christine Kambua Muyanga) / (12); (Mercy Jelimo Kosgei) / (33)	20
3rd place, bronze medalist(s)	Japan: Yukino Ninomiya / 10; Atsuko Matsumura / 14; Asami Kato / 15; Ayaka Mori / 18; (Risa Takenaka) / (26); (Yukari Abe) / (48)	57
4	United Kingdom	95
5	Canada	99
6	United States	100
7	Australia	133
8	Russia	203
Full results

- Note: Athletes in parentheses did not score for the team result.

== Medal table (unofficial) ==
Rank	Nation	Gold	Silver	Bronze	Total
1	Ethiopia	6	4	1	11
2	Kenya	2	4	2	8
3	Australia	0	0	1	1
3	Eritrea	0	0	1	1
3	Japan	0	0	1	1
3	Qatar	0	0	1	1
3	Uganda	0	0	1	1
Totals (7 entries)		8	8	8	24

- Note: Totals include both individual and team medals, with medals in the team competition counting as one medal.

== Participation ==
According to an unofficial count, 448 athletes from 57 countries participated. This is in agreement with the official numbers as published. The announced athletes from Moldova, Nepal, and Nigeria did not show.

- Algeria (16)
- Armenia (1)
- Australia (22)
- Azerbaijan (2)
- Bahrain (7)
- Belarus (1)
- Botswana (6)
- Brazil (14)
- Bulgaria (1)
- Burundi (1)
- Canada (26)
- Chile (1)
- China (4)
- DR Congo (2)
- Croatia (2)
- Denmark (1)
- Egypt (2)
- Eritrea (17)
- Ethiopia (27)
- France (10)
- Germany (1)
- Ghana (1)
- Greece (1)
- Guyana (1)
- Ireland (21)
- Italy (9)
- Japan (26)
- Jordan (4)
- Kenya (27)
- Kyrgyzstan (2)
- Lesotho (2)
- Libya (2)
- Malawi (3)
- Mexico (1)
- Morocco (21)
- Netherlands (1)
- New Zealand (4)
- Norway (1)
- Palestine (1)
- Poland (2)
- Portugal (18)
- Qatar (10)
- Russia (11)
- Rwanda (1)
- Seychelles (1)
- South Africa (10)
- Spain (23)
- Switzerland (1)
- Turkey (3)
- Turkmenistan (3)
- Uganda (13)
- United Arab Emirates (2)
- United Kingdom (27)
- United States (27)
- Yemen (1)
- Zambia (2)
- Zimbabwe (1)

== See also ==
- 2008 IAAF World Cross Country Championships – Senior men's race
- 2008 IAAF World Cross Country Championships – Junior men's race
- 2008 IAAF World Cross Country Championships – Senior women's race
- 2008 IAAF World Cross Country Championships – Junior women's race
- 2008 in athletics (track and field)
