= Melinda Vernon =

Australian deaf athlete and swimmer

Personal information
- Born: 27 September 1985 (age 40)

Sport
- Sport: Track and field, Triathlon, Swimming
Medal record
Women's Athletics
Representing Australia
Deaflympics
Gold medal – first place	2009 Taipei	10000m
Gold medal – first place	2009 Taipei	5000m
Silver medal – second place	2013 Sofia	10000m
Bronze medal – third place	2013 Sofia	5000m

Melinda Louise Vernon (born 27 September 1985) is an Australian female deaf track and field athlete, triathlete as well as a swimmer. She competed at the 2009 Summer Deaflympics and in the 2013 Summer Deaflympics representing Australia. Vernon won 2 gold, 1 silver and a bronze medal in the Deaflympic events she had competed in Athletic events.

Vernon relies solely on her vision as she is profoundly deaf in both ears. Louise Vernon was also a 2 time Sportswoman of the Year Finalist in 2008 and in 2009.

She has also been competing at the ITU World Triathlon Series.
