= Aselefech Mergia =

Ethiopian marathon runner (born 1985)

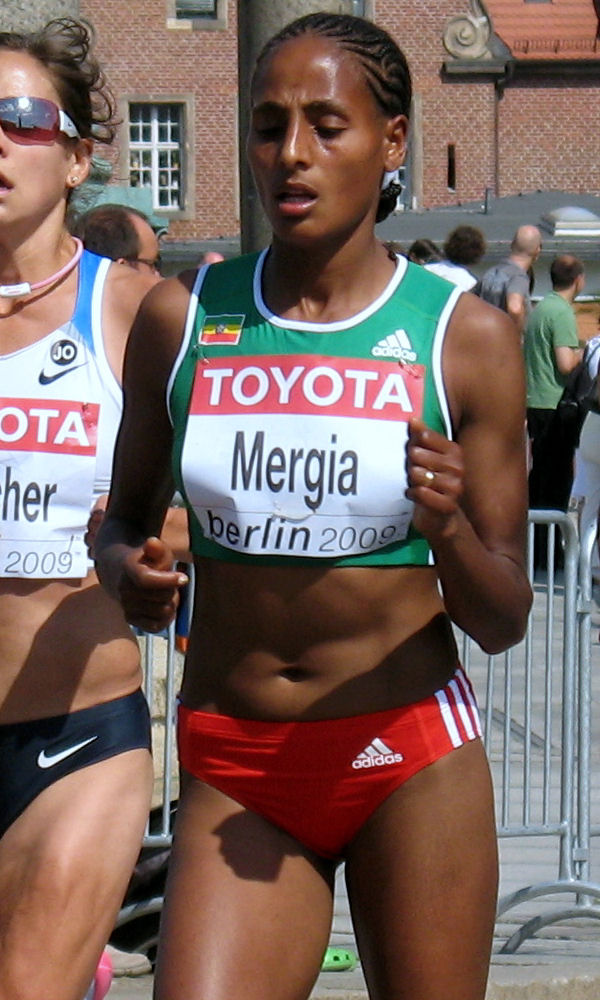

Personal information
- Born: 23 January 1985 (age 41)
- Height: 1.68 m (5 ft 6 in)
- Weight: 50 kg (110 lb)

Sport
- Country: Ethiopia
- Sport: Athletics
- Event: Marathon
Medal record
World Championships
Bronze medal – third place	2009 Berlin	Marathon

Aselefech Mergia Medessa (Oromo: Asallafach Margaa Mardaasaa; Amharic: አሰለፈች መርጊያ; born 23 January 1985) is an Ethiopian long-distance runner who competes in the marathon. She was a bronze medallist in the event at the 2009 World Championships in Athletics. She is a two-time winner of the Dubai Marathon and has finished in the top three at the Paris and London Marathons. She was retrospectively confirmed as the winner of the 2010 London Marathon after the top two were disqualified. Her personal best of 2:19:31 hours is a former Ethiopian record for the distance and places her within the top ten of all time.

== Career ==
She began taking part in professional road races in 2006, starting with a seventh-place finish at the Delhi Half Marathon. She won the Plymouth Half Marathon in 2007, finishing with a time of 1:14:50. She was second in the women's 10K in Glasgow, Scotland, finishing behind Vivian Cheruiyot but setting a personal best of 32:19 for the distance.

At the 2008 World Cross Country Championships she finished sixteenth in the senior race. With five Ethiopian runners ahead of her she missed out for a place on the victorious Ethiopian team. That year she won the Delhi Half Marathon with a personal best run of 1:08:17. She closed the year by winning a silver medal at the 2008 IAAF World Half Marathon Championships.

She made her marathon debut in April 2009 at the Paris Marathon, where she ran 2:25:02 for second place. She topped the podium at the World 10K Bangalore the following month, just holding off a charge from Mary Keitany to win the race in 32:08. Mergia won the bronze medal in the women's marathon at the 2009 World Championships in Athletics, recording a time of 2:25:32.

Aselefech improved her half marathon personal best to 1:07:22 at the 2010 Ras Al Khaimah Half Marathon. Despite the fast time, this was only enough for third place behind Elvan Abeylegesse and Mare Dibaba. More improvements came at the 2010 London Marathon: although initially finishing third with a run of 2:22:38, improving her best by over two and a half minutes, she was subsequently declared the winner after doping convictions nullified results of the first two runners. She returned to defend her Bangalore 10K title in May, but was beaten to the tape by compatriot Wude Ayalew and, finishing two seconds behind her, Mergia had to settle for the runner-up position. She regained her Delhi Half Marathon title in November: learning from the poor pacing which had left her in ninth place the previous year, she stuck to the front and won the race in a sprint finish ahead of Merima Mohammed.

She came close to her personal best with a win at the 2011 Dubai Marathon, just missed the course record mark, but gained the US$250,000 first place prize. She was chosen for the Ethiopian marathon team at the 2011 World Championships and was in twelfth at the 40 km point of the race, but dropped out in the final kilometres. In October she ran at the Great South Run and easily saw off a challenge from Doris Changeywo to win the 10-mile race. An attempt to defend her Delhi Half Marathon title ended in a third-place finish, although she improved her best time by a second.

In January 2012, Aselefech won the Dubai Marathon for the second time, setting an Ethiopian record of 2:19:31 hours to break the course record and become the seventh fastest woman ever over the distance.

In January 2015, Aselefech won the Dubai Marathon for the third time, 2:20:02.

== Personal bests ==
- 1500 metres - 4:23.39 min (2007)
- Half marathon 1:07:21 (2011)
- Marathon - 2:19:31 (2012)

== Competition record ==
Year	Competition	Venue	Position	Event
2008	World Cross Country Championships	Edinburgh, Scotland	16th	Senior race
2008	World Half Marathon Championships	Rio de Janeiro, Brazil	2nd	Half marathon
2009	World Championships	Berlin, Germany	3rd	Marathon
2011	World Championships	Daegu, South Korea	DNF	Marathon
2016	London Marathon	London, United Kingdom	2:23:57	Marathon

=== Road race wins ===
- Delhi Half Marathon: 2008, 2010
- World 10K Bangalore: 2009
- London Marathon: 2010
- Dubai Marathon: 2011, 2012, 2015
- Great South Run: 2011
