= Tigist Memuye =

Ethiopian long-distance runner

Personal information
- Nationality: Ethiopian
- Born: Tigist Memuye Gebeyahu; 26 October 1994 (age 31) Ethiopia
- Occupation: long-distance runner
- Years active: 2018–present

Sport
- Country: Ethiopia
- Sport: Long-distance running
- Event(s): Marathon, Half marathon

Achievements and titles
- Personal bests: Marathon: 2:24:23 (Geneva, 2 May 2021); Half marathon: 1:15:35 (13 October 2019); 10 Kilometres Road: 33:55 (31 December 2018)

Tigist Memuye Gebeyahu (born 26 October 1994) is an Ethiopian long-distance runner specializing in marathon events. She is best known for winning the 2021 Paris Marathon and the 2024 Milan Marathon. She holds a personal best of 2:24:23 in the marathon and trains alongside notable athletes, including former world record-holder Tigst Assefa.

== Career ==
Memuye began her international career with strong performances in shorter road races, setting a 10-kilometre personal best of 33:55 in 2018.

In May 2021, she achieved a personal best in the marathon, finishing in 2:24:23 at an event in Geneva. Later that year, in October 2021, Memuye secured a major victory by winning the 2021 Paris Marathon with a time of 2:26:11. This win was highlighted by a late surge to pull ahead of her competitors.

After a period impacted by injury, Memuye made a successful return to elite racing. In April 2024, she claimed victory at the 2024 Milan Marathon (also known as Wizz Air Milano Marathon), finishing in 2:26:32. In January 2025, she was listed as an elite pacer for the Tata Mumbai Marathon.

== Personal bests ==
- Marathon: 2:24:23 (Geneva, 2 May 2021)
- Half marathon: 1:15:35 (13 October 2019)
- 10 Kilometres Road: 33:55 (31 December 2018)

== Achievements ==
| Year | Competition | Venue | Position | Time |
|---|---|---|---|---|
| 2021 | 2021 Paris Marathon | Paris, France | 1st | 2:26:11 |
| 2024 | 2024 Milan Marathon | Milan, Italy | 1st | 2:26:32 |
