= Mathew Kisorio =

Kenyan long-distance runner (born 1989)

Mathew Kipkoech Kisorio
Personal information
- Born: 16 May 1989 (age 36)

Sport
- Country: Kenya
- Event(s): Marathon, half marathon

Mathew Kipkoech Kisorio (born 16 May 1989) is a Kenyan professional long-distance runner who competes in road running and cross country running competitions. He has a half marathon best of 58:46 minutes (making him the third fastest ever) and a marathon best of 2:07:06 hours. On the roads, he has won the Philadelphia Half Marathon, Kagawa Marugame Half Marathon and Stramilano races.

He has represented Kenya on the track and on grass. He was fourth at both the 2011 IAAF World Cross Country Championships and the 10,000 metres at the 2010 African Championships in Athletics.

Kisorio has been banned twice for doping violations. His first competition ban was for two years from 2012 to 2014 after admitting use of steroids. He also claimed that medical staff in Kenya had promoted a system of doping to athletes. His second ban of four years was issued in 2022 for whereabouts breaches relating to missed tests and filing failures.

== Career ==
=== Early career ===
He was born in Kapchumba in Nandi North District as a son of runner Some Muge. His brothers Peter Kimeli Some and Nicholas Kipchirchir Togom are active runners as well.

In July 2006 he ran the 10,000 metres in 28:50.1 minutes, in Nairobi. In 2007 he won the bronze medal in the junior race at the World Cross Country Championships, and won both the 5000 and 10,000 metres at the African Junior Championships. At the 2008 World Cross Country Championships he finished sixth in the junior race. On the track, he had achieved 8:00.39 minutes in the 3000 metres in September 2007 and improved this to 7:48.73 in September 2008 in Dubnica nad Váhom. In the 5000 metres he improved himself from 13:28.43 achieved in September 2007, to clocking in 13:11.57 minutes at the 2008 World Junior Championships in Bydgoszcz, winning the silver medal.

In 2009 he improved all his personal bests on the track: 7:34.29 minutes in the 3000 metres, achieved in September in Rieti; 13:02.40 minutes in the 5000 metres, achieved in July in Rome; and 27:15.44 minutes in the 10,000 metres, achieved in June in Utrecht. He made his debut at the World Cross Country Championships senior race and in the competition in Amman he finished sixth. He finished fourth in the 10,000 metres at the 2010 African Championships, but only set one personal best on the track that year; 12:57.83 in the 5000 metres at Bislett stadion in June.

=== Half and full marathons ===
He instead turned to road running. In March 2010 in Lisbon he ran the 15 kilometres in 42:11 minutes and the 20 kilometres in 57:44 minutes. At the Porto Half Marathon in October he made his debut in the time of 1:00:10 hours. In the same year he announced his decision to concentrate fully on road running from then on, in his own words "after realising I did not have the finishing speed required" for track running. He continued to compete in cross country, however, and was runner-up to Joseph Ebuya at the Cross Internacional de Soria. After a national circuit win in Nyahururu, he came second to Leonard Komon at the Cross de Itálica in January 2011.

He gained a place on the Kenyan national team after finishing as runner-up at the Kenyan Cross Country Championships in Nairobi in February. At the 2011 IAAF World Cross Country Championships he claimed fourth place and helped the Kenyan men (including minor medallists Paul Tanui and Vincent Chepkok) to the team gold medal. Soon after he ran a half marathon best of 60:03 minutes to win at the Stramilano race. He came third at the Giro di Castelbuono 10K in July. He ran the fourth fastest time ever for the distance at the Philadelphia Half Marathon in September, completing the distance in 58:46 minutes to break Haile Gebrselassie's United States all-comers record. Kisorio made his marathon debut at the 2011 New York City Marathon in November and had a fair first performance, finishing tenth in a time of 2:10:58 hours. His last race of the year was the Saint Silvester Road Race in Brazil and he came third over the 15K distance.

He ran at the Discovery Kenya Cross Country in January 2012 and was third behind Wilson Kiprop and Geoffrey Mutai. This prepared him for the Kagawa-Marugame Half Marathon, which he won two weeks later in a time of 1:00:02 hours. His second marathon competition came at the 2012 Boston Marathon. He was the race leader at the 30 km point, but progressively slowed in the hot conditions to end up tenth in a time of 2:18:15 hours. In 2019, he broke the course record at the Beijing Marathon to win in a time of 2:07:06 hours.
