= 2007 IAAF World Cross Country Championships – Senior men's race =

Senior men's race at the 2007 IAAF World Cross Country Championships
- Organisers: IAAF
- Edition: 35th
- Date: March 24
- Host city: Mombasa, Kenya
- Venue: Mombasa Golf Course
- Events: 1
- Distances: 12 km – Senior men
- Participation: 163 athletes from 44 nations

The Senior men's race at the 2007 IAAF World Cross Country Championships was held at the Mombasa Golf Course in Mombasa, Kenya, on March 24, 2007. Reports of the event were given in the Herald, and for the IAAF.

Complete results for individuals, and for teams were published.

== Race results ==
=== Senior men's race (12 km) ===
==== Individual ====
Rank	Athlete	Country	Time
1st place, gold medalist(s)	Zersenay Tadese	Eritrea	35:50
2nd place, silver medalist(s)	Moses Mosop	Kenya	36:13
3rd place, bronze medalist(s)	Bernard Kiprop Kipyego	Kenya	36:37
4	Gideon Ngatuny	Kenya	36:43
5	Hosea Mwok Macharinyang	Kenya	36:46
6	Michael Kipyego	Kenya	37:04
7	Tadese Tola	Ethiopia	37:04
8	Mubarak Hassan Shami	Qatar	37:09
9	Edwin Cheruiyot Soi	Kenya	37:27
10	Martin Kitiyo Toroitich	Uganda	37:31
11	Mo Farah	United Kingdom	37:31
12	Ahmad Hassan Abdullah	Qatar	37:37
13	Damian Paul Chopa	Tanzania	37:38
14	Anis Selmouni	Morocco	37:46
15	Markos Geneti	Ethiopia	37:49
16	Sileshi Sihine	Ethiopia	37:49
17	Ketema Nigusse	Ethiopia	37:57
18	Ahmed Baday	Morocco	37:57
19	Simon Koros Arusei	Kenya	37:57
20	Moses Aliwa	Uganda	37:58
21	Abderrahim Goumri	Morocco	38:02
22	Cuthbert Nyasango	Zimbabwe	38:04
23	Dieudonné Disi	Rwanda	38:07
24	Ali Abdalla	Eritrea	38:08
25	James Kibocha Theuri	France	38:13
26	Isaac Kiprop	Uganda	38:14
27	Chala Lemi	Ethiopia	38:14
28	Mustafa Mohamed	Sweden	38:18
29	Kiflom Sium	Eritrea	38:19
30	Samwel Kwaangu	Tanzania	38:22
31	Abdelhadi El Mouaziz	Morocco	38:24
32	Samson Kiflemariam	Eritrea	38:31
33	Mourad Marofit	Morocco	38:33
34	Barnabas Kiplagat Kosgei	Kenya	38:34
35	Brahim Beloua	Morocco	38:35
36	Adhanom Abraha	Eritrea	38:35
37	Wilson Kipkemei Busienei	Uganda	38:37
38	Sylvain Rukundo	Rwanda	38:43
39	James Kibet	Uganda	38:46
40	Ali Dawoud Sedam	Qatar	38:48
41	Kudakwashe Shoko	Zimbabwe	38:54
42	Lusapho April	South Africa	38:59
43	Gamal Belal Salem	Qatar	39:05
44	Simon Munyitu	France	39:06
45	Andrew Letherby	Australia	39:07
46	Peter Sulle	Tanzania	39:08
47	John Yuda Msuri	Tanzania	39:15
48	Tshamano Setone	South Africa	39:15
49	Ahmed Jumah Jaber	Qatar	39:16
50	Paulo Guerra	Portugal	39:18
51	Yang Dinghong	China	39:18
52	Ndabili Bashingili	Botswana	39:18
53	Gervais Nizeyimana	Rwanda	39:19
54	Yoshitaka Iwamizu	Japan	39:21
55	William Naranjo	Colombia	39:28
56	Michael Spence	United States	39:32
57	Etienne Bizamana	Burundi	39:33
58	Jean Baptiste Simukeka	Rwanda	39:35
59	Francis Musani	Uganda	39:35
60	Larbi Zeroual	France	39:37
61	Richard Soibei	Uganda	39:39
62	Dong Guojian	China	39:39
63	Michael Skinner	United Kingdom	39:40
64	David McNeill	Australia	39:41
65	Michael Shelley	Australia	39:42
66	Dickson Marwa Mkami	Tanzania	39:42
67	Collis Birmingham	Australia	39:46
68	Carles Castillejo	Spain	39:53
69	Mourad El Bannouri	Morocco	39:54
70	Gabalebe Moloko	Botswana	39:56
71	Jason Ward	United Kingdom	39:58
72	Martin Dent	Australia	40:00
73	Wirimai Juwawo	Zimbabwe	40:09
74	Philip Nicholls	United Kingdom	40:11
75	Manuel Damião	Portugal	40:12
76	Eliseo Martín	Spain	40:12
77	Gervais Hakizimana	Rwanda	40:13
78	Joaquim Francisco Chamane	Angola	40:19
79	Alan Buckley	United Kingdom	40:20
80	Takuya Fukatsu	Japan	40:21
81	Mbongeni Ngxazozo	South Africa	40:22
82	Philip Wicks	United Kingdom	40:25
83	Roberto Oliveira	Brazil	40:26
84	George Majaji	Zimbabwe	40:32
85	José Maduro	Portugal	40:32
86	Kidane Tadesse	Eritrea	40:35
87	Naoki Shibata	Japan	40:36
88	Matt Gabrielson	United States	40:41
89	Everton Luduvice Moraes	Brazil	40:45
90	Hassan Hirt	France	40:47
91	Nasser Shams Kareem	Qatar	40:49
92	Iván Hierro	Spain	40:50
93	Ricardo Ribas	Portugal	40:54
94	Boiphemelo Selagaboy	Botswana	40:59
95	Licinio Pimentel	Portugal	41:02
96	José Ríos	Spain	41:04
97	Cleveland Forde	Guyana	41:06
98	Pule Hlabahlaba	South Africa	41:07
99	Ryan Shay	United States	41:12
100	Phil Costley	New Zealand	41:17
101	Ben Noad	United Kingdom	41:21
102	Liam Adams	Australia	41:23
103	Marty Rosendahl	United States	41:25
104	Francis Khanje	Malawi	41:26
105	Joílson da Silva	Brazil	41:32
106	Ansu Sowe	Gambia	41:39
107	El Mustafa El Ahmadi	France	41:41
108	Hiroyuki Ono	Japan	41:42
109	Godfrey Rutayisire	Rwanda	41:52
110	Thamer Kamal Ali	Qatar	41:52
111	Andrew Sipe	Tanzania	41:59
112	Celedonio Rodriguez	United States	41:59
113	Steven Vernon	United Kingdom	42:00
114	Mangeh Mbacha	Cameroon	42:03
115	Hamidou Garba Alley	Niger	42:09
116	Zachary Sabatino	United States	42:11
117	Keineetse Moswasi	Botswana	42:15
118	Daniel Freitas	Brazil	42:18
119	José Luis Blanco	Spain	42:25
120	Nicholas Kemboi	Qatar	42:37
121	Ahmed Bakry	Egypt	42:39
122	Stéphane Joly	Switzerland	42:43
123	Rui Teixeira	Portugal	42:54
124	Samoel Girardi	Brazil	43:13
125	Ajmal Amirov	Tajikistan	43:19
126	Hidekazu Sato	Japan	43:19
127	Dharamjal Jeetun	Mauritius	43:29
128	Milan Kocourek	Czech Republic	43:59
129	Fasil Bizuneh	United States	44:00
130	Iddriss Adam	Ghana	44:08
131	Hiroki Matsumura	Japan	44:11
132	Iron Hlophe	Eswatini	44:33
133	Yuta Takahashi	Japan	44:48
134	Adriano Meneses	Brazil	46:07
—	Konan Severin N'dri	Côte d'Ivoire	DNF
—	Michael Tesfay	Eritrea	DNF
—	Günther Weidlinger	Austria	DNF
—	Mohammed Abdelhak Zakaria	Bahrain	DNF
—	Mustapha Essaïd	France	DNF
—	Richard Kipkemboi Mateelong	Kenya	DNF
—	Solomon Tsige	Ethiopia	DNF
—	Sultan Khamis Zaman	Qatar	DNF
—	Mohamed Turay	Sierra Leone	DNF
—	Tariku Bekele	Ethiopia	DNF
—	Willy Nduwimana	Burundi	DNF
—	Moussa Barkaoui	France	DNF
—	Kenenisa Bekele	Ethiopia	DNF
—	Nuno Costa	Portugal	DNF
—	Rui Pedro Silva	Portugal	DNF
—	Khalid El Amri	Morocco	DNF
—	Boniface Kiprop	Uganda	DNF
—	Bill Rogers	Liberia	DNF
—	Moses Kipsiro	Uganda	DNF
—	Koichiro Nagata	Japan	DNF
—	Abebe Dinkesa	Ethiopia	DNF
—	Antoine Simon Labiche	Seychelles	DNF
—	Boy Soke	South Africa	DNF
—	Yonas Kifle	Eritrea	DNF
—	Tesfayohannes Mesfin	Eritrea	DNF
—	Antonio David Jiménez	Spain	DNF
—	Mohammed Amyn	Morocco	DNF
—	Raphael Segodi	South Africa	DNF
—	Richard Bwalya	Zambia	DNF
—	Fabiano Joseph Naasi	Tanzania	DNS
—	Mande Ilunga	DR Congo	DNS

==== Teams ====
Rank	Team	Points
1st place, gold medalist(s)	Kenya: Moses Mosop / 2; Bernard Kiprop Kipyego / 3; Gideon Ngatuny / 4; Hosea Mwok Macharinyang / 5; Michael Kipyego / 6; Edwin Cheruiyot Soi / 9; (Simon Koros Arusei) / (19); (Barnabas Kiplagat Kosgei) / (34); (Richard Kipkemboi Mateelong) / (DNF)	29
2nd place, silver medalist(s)	Morocco: Anis Selmouni / 14; Ahmed Baday / 18; Abderrahim Goumri / 21; Abdelhadi El Mouaziz / 31; Mourad Marofit / 33; Brahim Beloua / 35; (Mourad El Bannouri) / (69); (Khalid El Amri) / (DNF); (Mohammed Amyn) / (DNF)	152
3rd place, bronze medalist(s)	Uganda: Martin Kitiyo Toroitich / 10; Moses Aliwa / 20; Isaac Kiprop / 26; Wilson Kipkemei Busienei / 37; James Kibet / 39; Francis Musani / 59; (Richard Soibei) / (61); (Boniface Kiprop) / (DNF); (Moses Kipsiro) / (DNF)	191
4	Eritrea: Zersenay Tadese / 1; Ali Abdalla / 24; Kiflom Sium / 29; Samson Kiflemariam / 32; Adhanom Abraha / 36; Kidane Tadasse / 86; (Michael Tesfay) / (DNF); (Tesfayohannes Mesfin) / (DNF); (Yonas Kifle) / (DNF)	208
5	Qatar: Mubarak Hassan Shami / 8; Ahmad Hassan Abdullah / 12; Ali Dawoud Sedam / 40; Gamal Belal Salem / 43; Ahmed Jumah Jaber / 49; Nasser Shams Kareem / 91; (Thamer Kamal Ali) / (110); (Nicholas Kemboi) / (120); (Sultan Khamis Zaman) / (DNF)	243
6	Tanzania: Damian Paul Chopa / 13; Samwel Kwaangu / 30; Peter Sulle / 46; John Yuda Msuri / 47; Dickson Marwa Mkami / 66; Andrew Sipe / 111	313
7	Rwanda: Dieudonné Disi / 23; Sylvain Rukundo / 38; Gervais Nizeyimana / 53; Jean Baptiste Simukeka / 58; Gervais Hakizimana / 77; Godfrey Rutayisire / 109	358
8	United Kingdom: Mo Farah / 11; Michael Skinner / 63; Jason Ward / 71; Philip Nicholls / 74; Alan Buckley / 79; Philip Wicks / 82; (Ben Noad) / (101); (Steven Vernon) / (113)	380
9	Australia: Andrew Letherby / 45; David McNeill / 64; Michael Shelley / 65; Collis Birmingham / 67; Martin Dent / 72; Liam Adams / 102	415
10	Portugal: Paulo Guerra / 50; Manuel Damião / 75; José Maduro / 85; Ricardo Ribas / 93; Licinio Pimentel / 95; Rui Teixeira / 123; (Nuno Costa) / (DNF); (Rui Pedro Silva) / (DNF)	521
11	United States: Michael Spence / 56; Matt Gabrielson / 88; Ryan Shay / 99; Marty Rosendahl / 103; Celedonio Rodriguez / 112; Zachary Sabatino / 116; (Fasil Bizuneh) / (129)	574
12	Japan: Yoshitaka Iwamizu / 54; Takuya Fukatsu / 80; Naoki Shibata / 87; Hiroyuki Ono / 108; Hidekazu Sato / 126; Hiroki Matsumura / 131; (Yuta Takahashi) / (133); (Koichiro Nagata) / (DNF)	586
13	Brazil: Roberto Oliveira / 83; Everton Luduvice Moraes / 89; Joílson da Silva / 105; Daniel Freitas / 118; Samoel Girardi / 124; Adriano Meneses / 134	653

- Note: Athletes in parentheses did not score for the team result.

== Participation ==
According to an unofficial count, 163 athletes from 44 countries participated in the Senior men's race. This is in agreement with the official numbers as published. The announced athlete from the Democratic Republic of the Congo did not show.

- Angola (1)
- Australia (6)
- Austria (1)
- Bahrain (1)
- Botswana (4)
- Brazil (6)
- Burundi (2)
- Cameroon (1)
- China (2)
- Colombia (1)
- Côte d'Ivoire (1)
- Czech Republic (1)
- Egypt (1)
- Eritrea (9)
- Ethiopia (9)
- France (7)
- Gambia (1)
- Ghana (1)
- Guyana (1)
- Japan (8)
- Kenya (9)
- Liberia (1)
- Malawi (1)
- Mauritius (1)
- Morocco (9)
- New Zealand (1)
- Niger (1)
- Portugal (8)
- Qatar (9)
- Rwanda (6)
- Seychelles (1)
- Sierra Leone (1)
- South Africa (6)
- Spain (6)
- Eswatini (1)
- Sweden (1)
- Switzerland (1)
- Tajikistan (1)
- Tanzania (6)
- Uganda (9)
- United Kingdom (8)
- United States (7)
- Zambia (1)
- Zimbabwe (4)

== See also ==
- 2007 IAAF World Cross Country Championships – Junior men's race
- 2007 IAAF World Cross Country Championships – Senior women's race
- 2007 IAAF World Cross Country Championships – Junior women's race
