= 2007 IAAF World Cross Country Championships – Junior men's race =

Junior men's race at the 2007 IAAF World Cross Country Championships
- Organisers: IAAF
- Edition: 35th
- Date: March 24
- Host city: Mombasa, Kenya
- Venue: Mombasa Golf Course
- Events: 1
- Distances: 8 km – Junior men
- Participation: 126 athletes from 34 nations

The Junior men's race at the 2007 IAAF World Cross Country Championships was held at the Mombasa Golf Course in Mombasa, Kenya, on March 24, 2007. Reports of the event were given in the Herald, and for the IAAF.

Complete results for individuals, and for teams were published.

== Race results ==
=== Junior men's race (8 km) ===
==== Individual ====
Rank	Athlete	Country	Time
1st place, gold medalist(s)	Asbel Kiprop	Kenya	24:07
2nd place, silver medalist(s)	Vincent Kiprop Chepkok	Kenya	24:12
3rd place, bronze medalist(s)	Mathew Kipkoech Kisorio	Kenya	24:23
4	Leonard Patrick Komon	Kenya	24:25
5	Benjamin Kiplagat	Uganda	24:31
6	Issak Sibhatu	Eritrea	24:38
7	Imane Merga	Ethiopia	24:41
8	Samuel Tsegay	Eritrea	24:42
9	Tonny Wamulwa	Zambia	24:43
10	Geofrey Kusuro	Uganda	24:48
11	Nicholas Mulinge Makau	Kenya	24:50
12	Demssew Tsega	Ethiopia	24:52
13	Abraham Niyonkuru	Burundi	24:56
14	Teklemariam Medhin	Eritrea	24:56
15	Abreham Cherkos	Ethiopia	24:59
16	Amanuel Mesel	Eritrea	25:00
17	Tsegai Tewelde	Eritrea	25:00
18	Jean Claude Niyonizigiye	Burundi	25:06
19	Stephen Kiprotich	Uganda	25:07
20	Tola Bane	Ethiopia	25:15
21	Isaac Ayeko	Uganda	25:17
22	Marco Joseph	Tanzania	25:35
23	Dickson Huru	Uganda	25:35
24	Lukinga Uwezo	Tanzania	25:36
25	Abihorera Bora	Tanzania	25:39
26	Jordan Chipangama	Zambia	25:50
27	Mouhssine Cherkaoui	Morocco	25:51
28	Habtamu Fikadu	Ethiopia	26:01
29	Lesole Zim	South Africa	26:02
30	Hicham El Amrani	Morocco	26:04
31	Naser Jamal Naser	Qatar	26:07
32	Pierre-Célestin Nihorimbere	Burundi	26:07
33	Pascal Mombo Sarwat	Tanzania	26:13
34	Keisuke Tanaka	Japan	26:18
35	Adil Rached	Morocco	26:22
36	Edris Yousif	Sudan	26:23
37	Wilyam Filiph Rabih	Sudan	26:23
38	Morhad Amdouni	France	26:24
39	Ezechiel Nizigiyimana	Burundi	26:26
40	Yuki Yagi	Japan	26:28
41	Nail El Dod	Sudan	26:28
42	Moussa Karich	Morocco	26:28
43	Prosper Nkunzimana	Burundi	26:31
44	Goodson Chungu	Zambia	26:33
45	Xolisa Tyali	South Africa	26:41
46	Jake Robertson	New Zealand	26:46
47	Cansas Nhlapo	South Africa	26:54
48	Mohamed Elbendir	Spain	26:59
49	Ciprian Suhanea	Romania	27:02
50	Abdelmadjed Touil	Algeria	27:02
51	Ben Guest	Australia	27:03
52	Lotfi Chebli	Algeria	27:04
53	Shun Kurihara	Japan	27:05
54	Takuya Noguchi	Japan	27:07
55	Mahamoud Farah	Djibouti	27:10
56	Kenny Klotz	United States	27:11
57	Thorsten Baumeister	Germany	27:15
58	Lee Carey	United Kingdom	27:17
59	Takuya Nakayama	Japan	27:18
60	Merihun Crespi	Italy	27:19
61	Hassan Chahdi	France	27:20
62	Nasereldein Jalap	Sudan	27:28
63	Abdelghani Aït Bahmad	Morocco	27:30
64	Matthew Leeder	Canada	27:30
65	Rico Schwarz	Germany	27:33
66	Jefferson Peña	Colombia	27:35
67	Jonas Matti Markowski	Germany	27:37
68	Hichem Benkhalouf	Algeria	27:38
69	Manuel Stöckert	Germany	27:42
70	Fred Arapsudi	Uganda	27:44
71	Ricardo Mateus	Portugal	27:46
72	Andrew Livingstone	United Kingdom	27:47
73	Alessandro Turroni	Italy	27:48
74	Bentamra Boucherit	Algeria	27:51
75	Javier Peña	Colombia	27:51
76	Ben Ashkettle	Australia	27:56
77	Conor McNulty	United Kingdom	28:00
78	Diaaeldin Ahmed	Sudan	28:07
79	Massaoud Pedotti	Italy	28:08
80	Luis Alberto Orta	Venezuela	28:10
81	Matthew Hughes	Canada	28:13
82	Taoufik Makhloufi	Algeria	28:18
83	Wesley Mancilla	Colombia	28:20
84	Guillem Duran	Spain	28:24
85	Dean Brummer	South Africa	28:24
86	Ryan McNiff	United States	28:28
87	Ben Lindsay	United Kingdom	28:31
88	Mathew Mildenhall	New Zealand	28:31
89	David Forrester	United Kingdom	28:33
90	Alessandro Brancato	Italy	28:34
91	Pedro Cirne	Portugal	28:35
92	Fabio Pirillo	Italy	28:41
93	Takuro Nakanishi	Japan	28:45
94	Mohammed Al-Juraid	Yemen	28:46
95	Dmitry Zubkov	Russia	28:54
96	Greg Miller	Canada	28:59
97	Christian Hengmith	Germany	29:19
98	Christian Molitor	Luxembourg	29:38
99	Matthew Bruce	Canada	29:41
100	Matthew Tebo	United States	30:56
101	Andrea Seppi	Italy	31:04
102	Sebastian Martos	Spain	31:20
103	José Mario García	Spain	31:34
104	Makhmud Zaripov	Tajikistan	32:13
105	Ahmed Al-Rumaim	Yemen	32:19
—	Adam Hickey	United Kingdom	DNF
—	Javier García	Spain	DNF
—	Samuel Crowther	Australia	DNF
—	Christopher Hamer	Australia	DNF
—	Joshua Edmonds	United States	DNF
—	Noel Bateman	United States	DNF
—	Ahmed Sarhan	Yemen	DNF
—	Mugahed Al-Omal	Yemen	DNF
—	Dunken Mabvuto Matumbo	Zambia	DNF
—	Juan A. Pérez	Spain	DNF
—	Mohamed Bahri	Algeria	DNF
—	Abdelali Ech Challaouy	Morocco	DNF
—	Mark Henshaw	Canada	DNF
—	Mohamed Rashed Mubarak Al-Dhahri	United Arab Emirates	DNF
—	Emmanuel Giniki	Tanzania	DNF
—	Pascal Goti	Tanzania	DNF
—	Ibrahim Jeilan	Ethiopia	DNF
—	Dawid Szewczyk	Poland	DNF
—	Mark Tolstikhin	Russia	DNF
—	Leeto Hlalele	Lesotho	DNF
—	Paul Muteru Kuria	Kenya	DNF
—	Mohamed Abdule Abdi	Somalia	DNS
—	Sakila Lufumba	DR Congo	DNS

==== Teams ====
Rank	Team	Points
1st place, gold medalist(s)	Kenya: Asbel Kiprop / 1; Vincent Kiprop Chepkok / 2; Mathew Kipkoech Kisorio / 3; Leonard Patrick Komon / 4; (Nicholas Mulinge Makau) / (11); (Paul Muteru Kuria) / (DNF)	10
2nd place, silver medalist(s)	Eritrea: Issak Sibhatu / 6; Samuel Tsegay / 8; Teklemariam Medhin / 14; Amanuel Mesel / 16; (Tsegai Tewelde) / (17)	44
3rd place, bronze medalist(s)	Ethiopia: Imane Merga / 7; Demssew Tsega / 12; Abreham Cherkos / 15; Tola Bane / 20; (Habtamu Fikadu) / (28); (Ibrahim Jeilan) / (DNF)	54
4	Uganda: Benjamin Kiplagat / 5; Geofrey Kusuro / 10; Stephen Kiprotich / 19; Isaac Ayeko / 21; (Dickson Huru) / (23); (Fred Arapsudi) / (70)	55
5	Burundi: Abraham Niyonkuru / 13; Jean Claude Niyonizigiye / 18; Pierre-Célestin Nihorimbere / 32; Ezechiel Nizigiyimana / 39; (Prosper Nkunzimana) / (43)	102
6	Tanzania: Marco Joseph / 22; Lukinga Uwezo / 24; Abihorera Bora / 25; Pascal Mombo Sarwat / 33; (Emmanuel Giniki) / (DNF); (Pascal Goti) / (DNF)	104
7	Morocco: Mouhssine Cherkaoui / 27; Hicham El Amrani / 30; Adil Rached / 35; Moussa Karich / 42; (Abdelghani Aït Bahmad) / (63); (Abdelali Ech Challaouy) / (DNF)	134
8	Sudan: Edris Yousif / 36; Wilyam Filiph Rabih / 37; Nail El Dod / 41; Nasereldein Jalap / 62; (Diaaeldin Ahmed) / (78)	176
9	Japan: Keisuke Tanaka / 34; Yuki Yagi / 40; Shun Kurihara / 53; Takuya Noguchi / 54; (Takuya Nakayama) / (59); (Takuro Nakanishi) / (93)	181
10	South Africa: Lesole Zim / 29; Xolisa Tyali / 45; Cansas Nhlapo / 47; Dean Brummer / 85	206
11	Algeria: Abdelmadjed Touil / 50; Lotfi Chebli / 52; Hichem Benkhalouf / 68; Bentamra Boucherit / 74; (Taoufik Makhloufi) / (82); (Mohamed Bahri) / (DNF)	244
12	Germany: Thorsten Baumeister / 57; Rico Schwarz / 65; Jonas Matti Markowski / 67; Manuel Stöckert / 69; (Christian Hengmith) / (97)	258
13	United Kingdom: Lee Carey / 58; Andrew Livingstone / 72; Conor McNulty / 77; Ben Lindsay / 87; (David Forrester) / (89); (Adam Hickey) / (DNF)	294
14	Italy: Merihun Crespi / 60; Alessandro Turroni / 73; Massaoud Pedotti / 79; Alessandro Brancato / 90; (Fabio Pirillo) / (92); (Andrea Seppi) / (101)	302
15	Spain: Mohamed Elbendir / 48; Guillem Duran / 84; Sebastian Martos / 102; José Mario García / 103; (Javier García) / (DNF); (Juan A. Pérez) / (DNF)	337
16	Canada: Matthew Leeder / 64; Matthew Hughes / 81; Greg Miller / 96; Matthew Bruce / 99; (Mark Henshaw) / (DNF)	340

- Note: Athletes in parentheses did not score for the team result.

== Participation ==
According to an unofficial count, 126 athletes from 34 countries participated in the Junior men's race. This is in agreement with the official numbers as published. The announced athletes from the Democratic Republic of the Congo and Somalia did not show.

- Algeria (6)
- Australia (4)
- Burundi (5)
- Canada (5)
- Colombia (3)
- Djibouti (1)
- Eritrea (5)
- Ethiopia (6)
- France (2)
- Germany (5)
- Italy (6)
- Japan (6)
- Kenya (6)
- Lesotho (1)
- Luxembourg (1)
- Morocco (6)
- New Zealand (2)
- Poland (1)
- Portugal (2)
- Qatar (1)
- Romania (1)
- Russia (2)
- South Africa (4)
- Spain (6)
- Sudan (5)
- Tajikistan (1)
- Tanzania (6)
- Uganda (6)
- United Arab Emirates (1)
- United Kingdom (6)
- United States (5)
- Venezuela (1)
- Yemen (4)
- Zambia (4)

== See also ==
- 2007 IAAF World Cross Country Championships – Senior men's race
- 2007 IAAF World Cross Country Championships – Senior women's race
- 2007 IAAF World Cross Country Championships – Junior women's race
