= 2009 IAAF World Half Marathon Championships =

- Host city: Birmingham, England, United Kingdom
- Nations: 39
- Athletes: 157
- Events: 2
- Dates: 2009-10-11
- Race length: 21.0975 kilometres
- Individual prize money (US$): 1st: 30,000; 2nd: 15,000; 3rd: 10,000; 4th: 7,000; 5th: 5,000; 6th: 3,000
- Team prize money (US$): 1st: 15,000; 2nd: 12,000; 3rd: 9,000; 4th: 7,500; 5th: 6,000; 6th: 3,000

The 2009 IAAF World Half Marathon Championships were held in Birmingham, United Kingdom on 11 October 2009. It was the final event of the International Association of Athletics Federations' 2009 World Athletics Series.

== Organisation ==
The city of Birmingham was selected by the IAAF Council after a presentation by UK Athletics and the Birmingham City Council. It was the third time the championships were held in Great Britain, after the 1992 event on Tyneside and the 2001 edition in Bristol. A number of events were scheduled to coincide with the Championships: a three-day convention for Association of International Marathons and Distance Races, as well as an IAAF press conference to discuss the future and progression of the sport.

In addition to the main World Championship races, the Birmingham Half Marathon started thirty minutes after the women's World Championship race. Organised by Birmingham City Council and sponsored by EDF Energy, it was the second edition of the mass race which attracted over 9,000 runners in 2008. A total of 12,068 people signed up to run the Birmingham Half Marathon.

A total of 47 IAAF member federations sent athletes to the championships, the highest number since the 2002 edition.

== Course ==
The men's race and women's race started at BST 9.00 am and 9:30 am, respectively. The course passed through Birmingham city centre and the city's southern suburbs, with Centenary Square acting as the start and end point of the race. Highlights along the route included Cannon Hill Park, Cadbury World and the Bournville model village, Edgbaston Cricket Ground, Victoria Square and the Bull Ring. The course is largely straight and flat, although there is an abrupt descent and ascent at the start and finish of the route, and slight rises and falls between the 10 km and 16 km marks around Selly Park.

== Competition ==
=== Pre-race ===
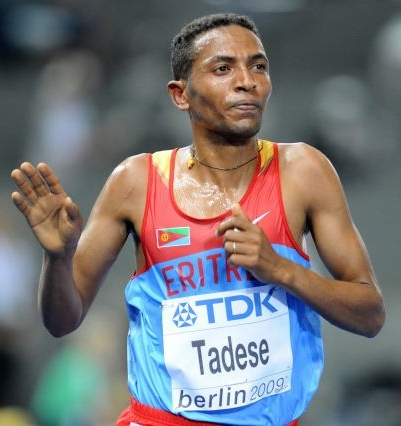
Zersenay Tadese entered the competition as the favourite, having won the 2007 and 2008 races

Eritrean runner Zersenay Tadese, who had won the last two World Half Marathons as well as the 20 km race in 2006, announced that he would attempt to defend his title and his chances improved after world leader Patrick Makau Musyoki was not listed in the Kenyan squad. The defending women's champion Lornah Kiplagat did not attempt to defend her title due to a knee injury, and three-time champion Paula Radcliffe filled the void, aiming for a record fourth title. However, she too withdrew from the event due to tonsillitis, dealing a blow to the host nation's chances.

Tadese was the outright favourite of the men's race, with his greatest challenge coming from Kenyans Sammy Kitwara, Wilson Kipsang Kiprotich and Bernard Kiprop Kipyego, and Ethiopians Tilahun Regassa and Dereje Tesfaye. Dathan Ritzenhein, Fabiano Joseph Naasi and Marilson dos Santos were other outside chances. The Kenyan and Eritrean men's teams were favoured for the gold and silver team medals, while the teams from Ethiopia, Tanzania and Uganda were suggested as possible bronze medallists. Unusually, Qatar (whose team placed third in 2008) did not send any runners to the competition.

In the women's race, Kenyan Mary Jepkosgei Keitany was the favourite in the absence of Kiplagat and Radcliffe. Keitany went into the championships as the world's leading half marathon runner, having run 1:07:00 seconds earlier in the season, and the race was seen as a chance for her to make her mark over the distance. The next fastest runner that season was her compatriot Philes Ongori, although her time of 1:07:50 was some way off Keitany's. Two more possible medallists, Filomena Cheyech and Caroline Cheptanui Kilel rounded out a strong Kenyan squad. The Ethiopian team was missing two of their best runners (Dire Tune and Aselefech Mergia), but Abebu Gelan and Aberu Kebede were still in medal contention. The Japanese athletes, Yukiko Akaba and Yurika Nakamura, looked to maintain Japan's past podium form in the team competition. New Zealand's Kim Smith was regarded as an unknown quantity, as she was moving into road competitions after much success on the track.

At the pre-race press conference, the IAAF General Secretary, Pierre Weiss, lamented the relative lack of interest in the competition, vocalising the IAAF's dissatisfaction with the number of competing athletes and federations. He acknowledged that the competition's prize money was not at parity with other top level marathons. Wilson Kipketer, the 800 metres world record holder, pointed out that the standard of Europe's long-distance runners had been largely surpassed by other regions' athletes, most notably from Africa. Kipketer argued that Europeans were not making the most of their sporting facilities and were "not training properly or timing and planning their seasons properly". Ed Warner, chairman of UK Athletics, agreed that a rethink was needed in terms of training and mindset.

== Medallists ==
Detailed reports on the event and an appraisal of the results were given both for the men's race and for the women's race.

Event	Gold		Silver		Bronze	
Individual
Men	Zersenay Tadesse (ERI)	59:35	Bernard Kipyego (KEN)	59:59	Dathan Ritzenhein (USA)	1:00:00
Women	Mary Jepkosgei Keitany (KEN)	1:06:36	Philes Moora Ongori (KEN)	1:07:38	Aberu Kebede (ETH)	1:07:39
Team
Team Men	Kenya	3:01:06	Eritrea	3:02:39	Ethiopia	3:06:42
Team Women	Kenya	3:22:30	Ethiopia	3:26:14	Japan	3:31:31

== Race results ==
Complete results were published for the men's race, for the women's race, for men's team, and for women's team.

=== Men's ===
Rank	Athlete	Nationality	Time	Notes
Gold medal	Zersenay Tadese	Eritrea	59:35	CR
Silver medal	Bernard Kipyego	Kenya	59:59	
Bronze medal	Dathan Ritzenhein	United States	1:00:00	PB
4	Wilson Kipsang Kiprotich	Kenya	1:00:08	
5	Samuel Tsegay	Eritrea	1:00:17	PB
6	Wilson Kwambai Chebet	Kenya	1:00:59	
7	Kiplimo Kimutai	Kenya	1:01:31	SB
8	Stephen Mokoka	South Africa	1:01:36	
9	Juan Carlos Romero	Mexico	1:01:48	PB
10	Sammy Kitwara	Kenya	1:01:59	
11	Tilahun Regassa	Ethiopia	1:02:08	SB
12	Dereje Tesfaye	Ethiopia	1:02:09	
13	Rachid Kisri	Morocco	1:02:11	PB
14	Abebe Negewo	Ethiopia	1:02:25	PB
15	Fabiano Joseph	Tanzania	1:02:25	SB
16	Marco Joseph	Tanzania	1:02:41	PB
17	Marilson dos Santos	Brazil	1:02:41	SB
18	Daniele Meucci	Italy	1:02:43	PB
19	Abrha Adhanom	Eritrea	1:02:47	PB
20	Andrew Carlson	United States	1:02:50	
21	Yukihiro Kitaoka	Japan	1:02:50	
22	Fouad Larhiouch	France	1:02:55	PB
23	James Theuri	France	1:02:55	
24	Martin Toroitich	Uganda	1:02:55	SB
25	Ryosuke Fukuyama	Japan	1:03:00	
26	Andrew Lemoncello	Great Britain	1:03:03	PB
27	Moses Aliwa	Uganda	1:03:06	
28	Yoshinori Oda	Japan	1:03:09	
29	Olebogeng Masire	South Africa	1:03:13	
30	Mourad Marofit	Morocco	1:03:22	SB
31	Shamba Gitimi	Tanzania	1:03:23	SB
32	Atsushi Sato	Japan	1:03:25	
33	Jackson Kiprop	Uganda	1:03:31	
34	Simon Munyutu	France	1:03:33	
35	Solomon Tsige	Ethiopia	1:03:33	SB
36	Mbongeni Ngxazozo	South Africa	1:03:47	
37	Sylvain Rukundo	Rwanda	1:03:59	SB
38	James Carney	United States	1:04:00	SB
39	Jean Baptiste Simukeka	Rwanda	1:04:02	PB
40	Gervais Hakizimana	Rwanda	1:04:04	
41	Eric Sebahire	Rwanda	1:04:09	PB
42	Jeffrey Gwebu	South Africa	1:04:11	
43	Jeff Hunt	Australia	1:04:16	
44	Tesfahiwet Gebretinsae	Eritrea	1:04:17	PB
45	Giomar da Silva	Brazil	1:04:20	
46	Mark Miles	Great Britain	1:04:21	
47	Yemane Teame	Eritrea	1:04:23	PB
48	Giovanni Ruggiero	Italy	1:04:24	
49	Ahmed Baday	Morocco	1:04:42	
50	Abdellah Taghrafet	Morocco	1:04:46	
51	Miguel Ángel Gamonal	Spain	1:04:47	
52	Denis Curzi	Italy	1:04:51	SB
53	John Cusi	Peru	1:04:56	
54	Joe McAlister	Ireland	1:04:57	PB
55	Matt Loiselle	Canada	1:04:59	
56	Francesco Bona	Italy	1:05:01	
57	Arturo Regules	Mexico	1:05:09	
58	Sergio Reyes	Mexico	1:05:11	PB
59	Jaime Caldua	Peru	1:05:16	
60	Phil Wicks	Great Britain	1:05:18	
61	David Ramard	France	1:05:23	
62	Daniele Caimmi	Italy	1:05:23	SB
63	Andrew Jones	Great Britain	1:05:37	
64	Brett Gotcher	United States	1:05:43	
65	Cristinel Irimia	Romania	1:05:51	
66	Keenetse Moswasi	Botswana	1:05:59	SB
67	Tomomi Itakura	Japan	1:06:00	
68	Benoit Holzerny	France	1:06:00	
69	Constantino León	Peru	1:06:05	
70	Scotty Bauhs	United States	1:06:07	SB
71	Godiraone Nthompe	Botswana	1:06:07	PB
72	Ndabili Bashingili	Botswana	1:06:08	SB
73	Rapula Diphoko	Botswana	1:06:12	PB
74	Pablo Villalobos	Spain	1:06:17	
75	Gareth Raven	Great Britain	1:06:51	
76	Kaelo Mosalagae	Botswana	1:07:10	SB
77	Wu Shiwei	China	1:07:14	
78	João de Lima	Brazil	1:07:14	
79	Franck de Almeida	Brazil	1:07:44	
80	Daglas Mashili	Zambia	1:07:56	SB
81	Taivo Püi	Estonia	1:07:58	PB
82	Edmundo Torres	Peru	1:08:12	
83	José Francisco Chávez	Costa Rica	1:08:41	PB
84	César Lizano	Costa Rica	1:09:08	PB
85	Xolisa Tyali	South Africa	1:09:12	
86	Chan Ka Ho	Hong Kong	1:10:17	SB
87	Fernando Rey	Spain	1:10:18	
88	Marcel Tschopp	Liechtenstein	1:10:28	SB
89	Ronnie Holassie	Trinidad and Tobago	1:11:18	SB
90	Gaylord Silly	Seychelles	1:11:57	
91	Simon Labiche	Seychelles	1:12:01	SB
92	Mengi Patou	DR Congo	1:12:17	PB
93	Andrew Pollando	Uganda	1:14:00	PB
94	Chan Chan Kit	Macau	1:28:04	SB
—	Haylu Mekonnen	Ethiopia	DNF	
—	Gary Murray	Ireland	DNF	
—	Mohamed Isak	Somalia	DNF	
—	Perhat Annagylyjov	Turkmenistan	DNF	
—	Damian Paul Chopa	Tanzania	DNS	

=== Women's ===
Rank	Athlete	Nationality	Time	Notes
Gold medal	Mary Jepkosgei Keitany	Kenya	1:06:36	CR
Silver medal	Philes Ongori	Kenya	1:07:38	PB
Bronze medal	Aberu Kebede	Ethiopia	1:07:39	PB
4	Caroline Cheptanui Kilel	Kenya	1:08:16	PB
5	Mestawet Tufa	Ethiopia	1:09:11	PB
6	Tirfi Tsegaye	Ethiopia	1:09:24	PB
7	Kim Smith	New Zealand	1:09:35	NR
8	Filomena Cheyech Daniel	Kenya	1:09:44	
9	Silvia Skvortsova	Russia	1:09:56	SB
10	Amy Yoder Begley	United States	1:10:09	PB
11	Yurika Nakamura	Japan	1:10:19	
12	Ryoko Kizaki	Japan	1:10:32	
13	Workitu Ayanu	Ethiopia	1:10:35	PB
14	René Kalmer	South Africa	1:10:37	PB
15	Remi Nakazato	Japan	1:10:40	
16	Serena Burla	United States	1:10:55	PB
17	Analía Rosa	Portugal	1:11:08	PB
18	Peninah Arusei	Kenya	1:11:10	
19	Annerien van Schalkwyk	South Africa	1:11:26	PB
20	Dulce María Rodríguez	Mexico	1:11:32	SB
21	Abebu Gelan	Ethiopia	1:11:33	
22	Elza Kireeva	Russia	1:11:34	PB
23	Furtuna Zegergish	Eritrea	1:11:56	
24	Claire Hallissey	Great Britain	1:12:14	
25	Yukiko Akaba	Japan	1:12:20	
26	Irina Timofeyeva	Russia	1:12:38	SB
27	Olivera Jevtić	Serbia	1:12:44	
28	Hiroko Shoi	Japan	1:12:46	
29	Maria Sig Møller	Denmark	1:12:50	PB
30	Cassie Fien	Australia	1:12:55	
31	Galina Aleksandrova	Russia	1:13:01	
32	Amy Hastings	United States	1:13:20	PB
33	Michelle Ross-Cope	Great Britain	1:13:50	
34	Alina Istudora	Romania	1:14:01	PB
35	Emma Quaglia	Italy	1:14:11	SB
36	Nyakisi Adero	Uganda	1:14:17	
37	Heidi Westover/Westerling	United States	1:14:22	
38	Marisol Romero	Mexico	1:14:26	PB
39	Poppy Mlambo	South Africa	1:14:27	PB
40	Inés Melchor	Peru	1:14:33	PB
41	Jimena Misayauri	Peru	1:14:47	
42	Ivana Iozzia	Italy	1:14:52	
43	Gemma Miles	Great Britain	1:14:56	
44	Alyson Dixon	Great Britain	1:15:19	
45	Rebecca Robinson	Great Britain	1:16:21	
46	Claudette Mukasakindi	Rwanda	1:16:31	PB
47	Elva Dryer	United States	1:16:42	
48	Nuța Olaru	Romania	1:16:56	
49	Hortencia Arazapalo	Peru	1:17:27	
50	Maria Baldaia	Brazil	1:18:32	SB
51	Julia Rivera	Peru	1:18:51	
52	Caroline Desprez	France	1:19:06	
53	Elizet Banda	Zambia	1:19:07	NR
54	Judith Ramírez	Mexico	1:19:41	
55	Caitriona Jennings	Ireland	1:20:47	
56	Liu Yingjie	China	1:24:29	PB
57	Chao Fong Leng	Macau	1:31:47	NR
58	Simone Zapha	Seychelles	1:38:58	PB
—	Inga Abitova	Russia	DQ	^{†}

^{†}: Inga Abitova from Russia was initially 9th (1:09:53), but her competition results were annulled, beginning October 10, 2009, because of breaking anti-doping regulations.

== Team results ==
=== Men's ===
Rank	Country	Team	Time
Gold medal	Kenya	Bernard Kipyego; Wilson Kipsang Kiprotich; Wilson Kwambai Chebet	3:01:06
Silver medal	Eritrea	Zersenay Tadese; Samuel Tsegay; Adhanom Abraha	3:02:39
Bronze medal	Ethiopia	Tilahun Regassa; Dereje Tesfaye; Abebe Negewo	3:06:42
4	United States	Dathan Ritzenhein; Andrew Carlson; James Carney	3:06:50
5	Tanzania	Fabiano Joseph; Marco Joseph; Shamba Gitimi	3:08:29
6	South Africa	Stephen Mokoka; Olebogeng Masire; Mbongeni Ngxazozo	3:08:36
7	Japan	Yukihiro Kitaoka; Ryosuke Fukuyama; Yoshinori Oda	3:08:59
8	France	Fouad Larhiouch; James Theuri; Simon Munyutu	3:09:23
9	Uganda	Martin Toroitich; Moses Aliwa; Jackson Kiprop	3:09:32
10	Morocco	Rachid Kisri; Mourad Marofit; Ahmed Baday	3:10:15
11	Italy	Daniele Meucci; Giovanni Ruggiero; Denis Curzi	3:11:58
12	Rwanda	Sylvain Rukundo; Jean Baptiste Simukeka; Gervais Hakizimana	3:12:05
13	Mexico	Juan Carlos Romero; Arturo Regules; Sergio Reyes	3:12:08
14	Great Britain	Andrew Lemoncello; Mark Miles; Phil Wicks	3:12:42
15	Brazil	Marilson dos Santos; Giomar da Silva; João de Lima	3:14:15
16	Peru	John Cusi; Jaime Caldua; Constantino León	3:16:17
17	Botswana	Keenetse Moswasi; Godiraone Nthompe; Ndabili Bashingili	3:18:14
18	Spain	Miguel Ángel Gamonal; Pablo Villalobos; Fernando Rey	3:21:22

=== Women's ===
Rank	Country	Team	Time
Gold medal	Kenya	Mary Keitany; Philes Ongori; Caroline Cheptanui Kilel	3:22:30 CR
Silver medal	Ethiopia	Aberu Kebede; Mestawet Tufa; Tirfi Tsegaye	3:26:14
3rd place, bronze medalist(s)	Japan	Yurika Nakamura; Ryoko Kizaki; Remi Nakazato	3:31:31
4	Russia	Silvia Skvortsova; Elza Kireeva; Irina Timofeyeva	3:34:08^{†}
5	United States	Amy Yoder Begley; Serena Burla; Amy Hastings	3:34:24
6	South Africa	René Kalmer; Annerien van Schalkwyk; Poppy Mlambo	3:36:30
7	Great Britain	Claire Hallissey; Michelle Ross-Cope; Gemma Miles	3:41:00
8	Mexico	Dulce María Rodríguez; Marisol Romero; Judith Ramírez	3:45:39
9	Peru	Inés Melchor; Jimena Misayauri; Hortencia Arazapalo	3:46:47

^{†}: The team from Russia was initially ranked 3rd (3:31:23), but fell behind Japan after the disqualification of Inga Abitova.

== Participation ==
The participation of 157 athletes (98 men/59 women) from 39 countries is reported.

- Australia (2)
- Botswana (5)
- Brazil (5)
- Canada (1)
- China (2)
- Democratic Republic of the Congo (1)
- Costa Rica (2)
- Denmark (1)
- Eritrea (6)
- Estonia (1)
- Ethiopia (10)
- France (6)
- Hong Kong (1)
- Ireland (3)
- Italy (7)
- Japan (10)
- Kenya (10)
- Liechtenstein (1)
- Macau (2)
- Mexico (6)
- Morocco (4)
- New Zealand (1)
- Peru (8)
- Portugal (1)
- Romania (3)
- Russia (5)
- Rwanda (5)
- Serbia (1)
- Seychelles (3)
- Somalia (1)
- South Africa (8)
- Spain (3)
- Tanzania (3)
- Trinidad and Tobago (1)
- Turkmenistan (1)
- Uganda (5)
- United Kingdom (10)
- United States (10)
- Zambia (2)
