= 2007 IAAF World Cross Country Championships – Senior women's race =

Senior women's race at the 2007 IAAF World Cross Country Championships
- Organisers: IAAF
- Edition: 35th
- Date: March 24
- Host city: Mombasa, Kenya
- Venue: Mombasa Golf Course
- Events: 1
- Distances: 8 km – Senior women
- Participation: 94 athletes from 30 nations

The Senior women's race at the 2007 IAAF World Cross Country Championships was held at the Mombasa Golf Course in Mombasa, Kenya, on March 24, 2007. Reports of the event were given in the Herald, and for the IAAF.

Complete results for individuals, and for teams were published.

== Race results ==
=== Senior women's race (8 km) ===
==== Individual ====
Rank	Athlete	Country	Time
1st place, gold medalist(s)	Lornah Kiplagat	Netherlands	26:23
2nd place, silver medalist(s)	Tirunesh Dibaba	Ethiopia	26:47
3rd place, bronze medalist(s)	Meselech Melkamu	Ethiopia	26:48
4	Gelete Burka	Ethiopia	26:55
5	Florence Jebet Kiplagat	Kenya	27:26
6	Pamela Chepchumba	Kenya	27:34
7	Priscah Jepleting Ngetich	Kenya	27:39
8	Vivian Cheruiyot	Kenya	28:10
9	Simret Sultan	Eritrea	28:16
10	Wude Ayalew	Ethiopia	28:18
11	Zhor El Kamch	Morocco	28:20
12	Jéssica Augusto	Portugal	28:21
13	Fridah Chepkemoi Domongole	Kenya	28:27
14	Fionnuala Britton	Ireland	28:45
15	Hattie Dean	United Kingdom	28:48
16	Hayley Yelling	United Kingdom	28:53
17	Mariem Alaoui Selsouli	Morocco	28:53
18	Anna Thompson	Australia	28:59
19	Koren Jelela	Ethiopia	29:10
20	Rosa Morató	Spain	29:13
21	Zaituni Jumanne	Tanzania	29:13
22	Christine Bardelle	France	29:15
23	Zakia Mrisho Mohamed	Tanzania	29:19
24	Marina Ivanova	Russia	29:19
25	Nebiat Habtemariam	Eritrea	29:20
26	Jane Suuto	Uganda	29:21
27	Elena Romagnolo	Italy	29:24
28	Elvan Abeylegesse	Turkey	29:26
29	Aimi Horikoshi	Japan	29:26
30	Catherine Ferrell	United States	29:34
31	Angeline Nyiransabimana	Rwanda	29:39
32	María Elena Moreno	Spain	29:39
33	Hanane Ouhaddou	Morocco	29:43
34	Sharon Tavengwa	Zimbabwe	29:45
35	Chen Xiaofang	China	29:46
36	Renee Metivier	United States	29:47
37	Victoria Mitchell	Australia	29:48
38	Malika Benlafkir	Morocco	29:52
39	Kathy Newberry	United States	29:54
40	Marta Romo	Spain	29:57
41	Kumi Akaishi	Japan	30:03
42	Lisa Jane Weightman	Australia	30:06
43	Judit Plá	Spain	30:08
44	Jessica Wright	New Zealand	30:11
45	Jia Chaofeng	China	30:16
46	Galina Saykina	Russia	30:19
47	Mestawet Tufa	Ethiopia	30:21
48	Catherine Webombesa	Uganda	30:25
49	Felicity Milton	United Kingdom	30:26
50	Saïda El Mehdi	Morocco	30:29
51	Tabitha Tsatsa	Zimbabwe	30:36
52	Epiphanie Nyirabarame	Rwanda	30:37
53	Valentina Belotti	Italy	30:40
54	Tomomi Yuda	Japan	30:45
55	Yui Nakadai	Japan	30:54
56	Felicité Uwingeneye	Rwanda	30:55
57	Sarah Salmon	Australia	30:57
58	Marina Ivanova	Russia	30:58
59	Claudette Mukasakindi	Rwanda	30:59
60	Eleanor Baker	United Kingdom	30:59
61	Rosa Barbosa	Brazil	31:02
62	Letekidan Gebreyohannes	Eritrea	31:02
63	Isabel Checa	Spain	31:06
64	Kristy Villis	Australia	31:08
65	Elizaveta Grechishnikova	Russia	31:24
66	Weini Tedros	Eritrea	31:25
67	Genessi Nyirahabimana	Rwanda	31:26
68	Miho Notagashira	Japan	31:28
69	Ernestina Paulino	Angola	31:47
70	Elsa Medhane	Eritrea	31:58
71	Mary Duerbeck	United States	32:01
72	Jackline Sakilu	Tanzania	32:17
73	Maria Lúcia Moraes	Brazil	32:25
74	Esiman Adzo Torgbadza	Ghana	32:28
75	Mammie Konnen-Lahun	Sierra Leone	32:32
76	Michele Cristina Das Chagas	Brazil	32:39
77	Lamberte Nyabamikazi	Rwanda	33:01
78	Faridah Chelanga	Uganda	33:05
79	Emily Chebet	Uganda	33:16
80	Oneile Dintwe	Botswana	35:01
81	Natasha Monique	Mauritius	36:26
82	Emilia Mikue Ondo	Equatorial Guinea	37:43
—	Yuka Kakimi	Japan	DNF
—	Bouchra Chaâbi	Morocco	DNF
—	Mónica Rosa	Portugal	DNF
—	Kate Reed	United Kingdom	DNF
—	Emily Chebet Muge	Kenya	DNF
—	Farida Makula	Tanzania	DNF
—	Pascalina Bombo	Tanzania	DNF
—	Dorcus Chesang	Uganda	DNF
—	Violet Raseboya	South Africa	DNF
—	Docus Inzikuru	Uganda	DNF
—	Josephine Deemay	Tanzania	DNF
—	Binnaz Uslu	Turkey	DQ^{†}

^{†}: Binnaz Uslu from Turkey did not finish, but was disqualified because of doping violations.

==== Teams ====
Rank	Team	Points
1st place, gold medalist(s)	Ethiopia: Tirunesh Dibaba / 2; Meselech Melkamu / 3; Gelete Burika / 4; Wude Ayalew / 10; (Koren Jelela) / (19); (Mestawet Tufa) / (47)	19
2nd place, silver medalist(s)	Kenya: Florence Jebet Kiplagat / 5; Pamela Chepchumba / 6; Priscah Jepleting Ngetich / 7; Vivian Cheruiyot / 8; (Fridah Chepkemoi Domongole) / (13); (Emily Chebet Muge) / (DNF)	26
3rd place, bronze medalist(s)	Morocco: Zhor El Kamch / 11; Mariem Alaoui Selsouli / 17; Hanane Ouhaddou / 33; Malika Benlafkir / 38; (Saïda El Mehdi) / (50); (Bouchra Chaâbi) / (DNF)	99
4	Spain: Rosa Morató / 20; María Elena Moreno / 32; Marta Romo / 40; Judith Plá / 43; (Isabel Checa) / (63)	135
5	United Kingdom: Hattie Dean / 15; Hayley Yelling / 16; Felicity Milton / 49; Eleanor Baker / 60; (Kate Reed) / (DNF)	140
6	Australia: Anna Thompson / 18; Victoria Mitchell / 37; Lisa Jane Weightman / 42; Sarah Salmon / 57; (Kristy Villis) / (64)	154
7	Eritrea: Simret Sultan / 9; Nebiat Habtemariam / 25; Letekidan Gebreyohannes / 62; Weini Tedros / 66; (Elsa Medhane) / (70)	162
8	United States: Catherine Ferrell / 30; Renee Metivier / 36; Kathy Newberry / 39; Mary Duerbeck / 71	176
9	Japan: Aimi Horikoshi / 29; Kumi Akaishi / 41; Tomomi Yuda / 54; Yui Nakadai / 55; (Miho Notagashira) / (68); (Yuka Kakimi) / (DNF)	179
10	Russia: Marina Ivanova / 24; Galina Saykina / 46; Marina Ivanova / 58; Elizaveta Grechishnikova / 65	193
11	Rwanda: Angeline Nyiransabimana / 31; Epiphanie Nyirabarame / 52; Felicité Uwingeneye / 56; Claudette Mukasakindi / 59; (Genessi Nyirahabimana) / (67); (Lamberte Nyabamikazi) / (77)	198
12	Uganda: Jane Suuto / 26; Catherine Webombesa / 48; Faridah Chelanga / 78; Emily Chebet / 79; (Docus Inzikuru) / (DNF); (Dorcus Chesang) / (DNF)	231

- Note: Athletes in parentheses did not score for the team result.

== Participation ==
According to an unofficial count, 94 athletes from 30 countries participated in the Senior women's race. This is in agreement with the official numbers as published.

- Angola (1)
- Australia (5)
- Botswana (1)
- Brazil (3)
- China (2)
- Equatorial Guinea (1)
- Eritrea (5)
- Ethiopia (6)
- France (1)
- Ghana (1)
- Ireland (1)
- Italy (2)
- Japan (6)
- Kenya (6)
- Mauritius (1)
- Morocco (6)
- Netherlands (1)
- New Zealand (1)
- Portugal (2)
- Russia (4)
- Rwanda (6)
- Sierra Leone (1)
- South Africa (1)
- Spain (5)
- Tanzania (6)
- Turkey (2)
- Uganda (6)
- United Kingdom (5)
- United States (4)
- Zimbabwe (2)

== See also ==
- 2007 IAAF World Cross Country Championships – Senior men's race
- 2007 IAAF World Cross Country Championships – Junior men's race
- 2007 IAAF World Cross Country Championships – Junior women's race
