= Track and field at the 2011 Military World Games – Men's 5000 metres =

The men's 5000 metres event at the 2011 Military World Games was held on 21 and 23 July at the Estádio Olímpico João Havelange.

== Records ==
Prior to this competition, the existing world and CISM record were as follows:

World Record	Kenenisa Bekele (ETH)	12:37.35	Hengelo, Netherlands	31 May 2004
CISM World Record	Sammy Kipketer (KEN)	13:19.87	Tivoli, Italy	7 September 2002

== Schedule ==
Date	Time	Round
21 July 2011		Semifinals
23 July 2011	10:20	Final

== Medalists ==
Gold	Silver	Bronze
Mark Kiptoo; Kenya	Vincent Kiprop; Kenya	Bilisuma Gelassa; Bahrain

== Results ==
=== Final ===
Rank	Name	Nationality	Time	Notes
1st place, gold medalist(s)	Mark Kiptoo	Kenya	13:06.17	CR
2nd place, silver medalist(s)	Vincent Kiprop	Kenya	13:06.31	
3rd place, bronze medalist(s)	Bilisuma Gelassa	Bahrain	13:06.73	
4	Hussain Al-Hamdah	Saudi Arabia	13:12.17	
5	Rabah Aboud	Algeria	13:19.00	
6	Mounir Miout	Algeria	13:19.73	
7	Dejenee Mootumaa	Bahrain	13:24.27	
8	Hassan Hirt	France	13:25.42	
9	Olivier Irabaruta	Burundi	13:28.80	
10	Yohan Durand	France	13:40.81	
11	Damian Paul Chopa	Tanzania	13:49.57	
12	Agus Prayogo	Indonesia	14:02.12	NR
13	Mosbah Lagha	Tunisia	14:10.41	
14	Tesfay Rondas	Eritrea	14:11.64	
	Abdullah Al-Joud	Saudi Arabia	DNF	
