= Gervais Hakizimana =

Rwandan athlete and coach (1987–2024)

Personal information
- Citizenship: Rwanda
- Born: 5 September 1987 Nyaruguru, Rwanda
- Died: 11 February 2024 (aged 36) near Kaptagat, Kenya
- Years active: 2006 – c. 2016 (as athlete) c. 2016 – 2024 (as coach)

Sport
- Sport: Track and field running
- Now coaching: Kelvin Kiptum (until 2024)

Gervais Hakizimana (5 September 1987 – 11 February 2024) was a Rwandan track and field athlete and coach.

== Biography ==
Gervais Hakizimana was born in Nyaruguru, Rwanda on 5 September 1987. At the age of 18 in 2006 he went to Kenya to train for the 2007 IAAF World Cross Country Championships. He fled Kenya during the 2007 post-election violence and went back to France. A few years later he returned to Kenya and trained in Chepkorio.

Hakizimana specialised in long-distance running and represented Rwanda at international competitions. He finished 17th in the 10,000 metres at the 2007 All-Africa Games, and competed at the IAAF World Half Marathon Championships at the 2007 edition, 2008 edition and 2009 edition as well as at the IAAF World Cross Country Championships in 2007, 2009 and 2011. On 28 May 2011 he set the Rwandan national record in the 3000 m steeplechase with a time of 8:39.05.

In 2015 he started struggling with injuries. He did not finish the 2016 London Marathon due to an injury which forced him to retire.

In early 2020 he went to Kenya, but due to the COVID-19 pandemic in Kenya he was not able to return to France. He met Kelvin Kiptum in this period and saw his potential after he ran two half marathons within 10 days.

Hakizimana settled in France, where he studied and lived on and off for several years. Kelvin Kiptum asked Hakizimana via WhatsApp for training advice. From this, Hakizimana became his coach. Kiptum became the marathon world record holder and the only person in history to run the marathon in less than two hours and one minute.

Hakizimana and Kiptum died in a traffic collision near Kaptagat, Kenya on 11 February 2024. Hakizimana was 36.
