= 2007 IAAF World Cross Country Championships =

Coordinates: 4°04′20″S 39°40′42″E

- Organisers: IAAF
- Edition: 35th
- Date: March 24
- Host city: Mombasa, Kenya
- Venue: Mombasa Golf Course
- Events: 4
- Distances: 12 km – Senior men 8 km – Junior men 8 km – Senior women 6 km – Junior women
- Participation: 470 athletes from 63 nations

The 2007 IAAF World Cross Country Championships took place on March 24, 2007. The races were held at the Mombasa Golf Course in Mombasa, Kenya. Four races took place, one for men, women, junior men and junior women respectively. All races encompassed both individual and team competition. The short race for men and women that was run between 1998 and 2006 was scrapped and the World Cross Country Championships went back to one-day format. Reports of the event were given in the Herald, and for the IAAF.

== Preparations ==
When Athletics Kenya (AK, the national governing body of Athletics) applied for the event, it used the slogan "Cross Country Comes Home", referring to Kenyan and East African traditional dominance at the event. Nevertheless, no formidable Kenyan runners are known to come from Kenyan Coast Province. Instead, successful Kenyan runners typically represent Kalenjin tribes who reside in The Rift Valley Kenya, approximately 700-800 kilometres from Mombasa. AK chose Mombasa as a venue due to better infrastructure (such as hotels) compared to other cities. The 2007 World Cross Country Championships is one of the biggest international athletics event held in Kenya since the 1987 All-Africa Games, held 20 years ago in Nairobi. Another event held in Kenya was the 2003 Cricket World Cup.

Other applicants for the event were Miami in the United States and Madrid in Spain, both withdrew their candidature before final vote. The World Cross Country Championships have been held in Africa three times before. In 1975 and 1998 it was held in Morocco, the 1996 event took place in South Africa.

There was also an IAAF Council meeting held in Mombasa, at which the host cities for 2011 and 2013 IAAF World Championships in Athletics were selected.

== Track and conditions ==
Mombasa, the host, is the second largest city in Kenya, a major port town and tourist center. The event was held at Mombasa Golf Club, located in Mombasa Island, just east of the Kilindini Harbour. The track was curvy but relatively flat. The underlying ground was mostly grass.

The weather was sunny, hot and humid, typical of Mombasa, resulting in exhausting conditions. This kind of weather may affect competitors who hail from distant latitudes, but also Kenyan and Ethiopian runners, who often come from cooler highland areas. One victim was Pauline Korikwiang, Kenyan runner who was attempting to defend her junior women's title but fainted one kilometer before the finishing line.

== Medallists ==
Event	Gold		Silver		Bronze	
Individual
Senior men (12 km)	Zersenay Tadese; Eritrea	35:50	Moses Mosop; Kenya	36:13	Bernard Kiprop Kipyego; Kenya	36:37
Junior men (8 km)	Asbel Kiprop; Kenya	24:07	Vincent Kiprop Chepkok; Kenya	24:12	Mathew Kipkoech Kisorio; Kenya	24:23
Senior women (8 km)	Lornah Kiplagat; Netherlands	26:23	Tirunesh Dibaba; Ethiopia	26:47	Meselech Melkamu; Ethiopia	26:48
Junior women (6 km)	Linet Chepkwemoi Barasa; Kenya	20:52	Mercy Jelimo Kosgei; Kenya	20:59	Veronica Nyaruai Wanjiru; Kenya	21:10
Team
Senior men	Kenya	29	Morocco	152	Uganda	191
Junior men	Kenya	10	Eritrea	44	Ethiopia	54
Senior women	Ethiopia	19	Kenya	26	Morocco	99
Junior women	Kenya	13	Eritrea	33	Ethiopia	36

== Race results ==
=== Senior men's race (12 km) ===
Kenenisa Bekele of Ethiopia, who has won five consecutive long and short course races, promised to quit cross country running after the 2006 World Championships. However, he changed his mind and competed in Mombasa after all. A pre-race favourite, Bekele did not finish the race and thus failed to win historical sixth consecutive title.

Zersenay Tadese won the event and became the first cross-country world champion for Eritrea. Tadese is also the 2006 IAAF World Road Running Championships men's gold medalist.

Complete results for senior men and for senior men's teams were published.

Individual race
Rank	Athlete	Country	Time
1st place, gold medalist(s)	Zersenay Tadese	Eritrea	35:50
2nd place, silver medalist(s)	Moses Mosop	Kenya	36:13
3rd place, bronze medalist(s)	Bernard Kiprop Kipyego	Kenya	36:37
4	Gideon Ngatuny	Kenya	36:43
5	Hosea Macharinyang	Kenya	36:46
6	Michael Kipyego	Kenya	37:04
7	Tadese Tola	Ethiopia	37:04
8	Mubarak Hassan Shami	Qatar	37:09
9	Edwin Cheruiyot Soi	Kenya	37:27
10	Martin Kitiyo Toroitich	Uganda	37:31
11	Mo Farah	United Kingdom	37:31
12	Ahmad Hassan Abdullah	Qatar	37:37
Full results

Teams
Rank	Team	Points
1st place, gold medalist(s)	Kenya: Moses Mosop / 2; Bernard Kiprop Kipyego / 3; Gideon Ngatuny / 4; Hosea Macharinyang / 5; Michael Kipyego / 6; Edwin Cheruiyot Soi / 9; (Simon Koros Arusei) / (19); (Barnabas Kiplagat Kosgei) / (34); (Richard Kipkemboi Mateelong) / (DNF)	29
2nd place, silver medalist(s)	Morocco: Anis Selmouni / 14; Ahmed Baday / 18; Abderrahim Goumri / 21; Abdelhadi El Mouaziz / 31; Mourad Marofit / 33; Brahim Beloua / 35; (Mourad El Bannouri) / (69); (Khalid El Amri) / (DNF); (Mohammed Amyn) / (DNF)	152
3rd place, bronze medalist(s)	Uganda: Martin Kitiyo Toroitich / 10; Moses Aliwa / 20; Isaac Kiprop / 26; Wilson Kipkemei Busienei / 37; James Kibet / 39; Francis Musani / 59; (Richard Soibei) / (61); (Boniface Kiprop) / (DNF); (Moses Kipsiro) / (DNF)	191
4	Eritrea	208
5	Qatar	243
6	Tanzania	313
7	Rwanda	358
8	United Kingdom	380
Full results

- Note: Athletes in parentheses did not score for the team result.

=== Junior men's race (8 km) ===
Complete results for junior men and for junior men's teams were published.

Individual race
Rank	Athlete	Country	Time
1st place, gold medalist(s)	Asbel Kiprop	Kenya	24:07
2nd place, silver medalist(s)	Vincent Kiprop Chepkok	Kenya	24:12
3rd place, bronze medalist(s)	Mathew Kipkoech Kisorio	Kenya	24:23
4	Leonard Patrick Komon	Kenya	24:25
5	Benjamin Kiplagat	Uganda	24:31
6	Issak Sibhatu	Eritrea	24:38
7	Imane Merga	Ethiopia	24:41
8	Samuel Tsegay	Eritrea	24:42
9	Tonny Wamulwa	Zambia	24:43
10	Geofrey Kusuro	Uganda	24:48
11	Nicholas Mulinge Makau	Kenya	24:50
12	Demssew Tsega	Ethiopia	24:52
Full results

Teams
Rank	Team	Points
1st place, gold medalist(s)	Kenya: Asbel Kiprop / 1; Vincent Kiprop Chepkok / 2; Mathew Kipkoech Kisorio / 3; Leonard Patrick Komon / 4; (Nicholas Mulinge Makau) / (11); (Paul Muteru Kuria) / (DNF)	10
2nd place, silver medalist(s)	Eritrea: Issak Sibhatu / 6; Samuel Tsegay / 8; Teklemariam Medhin / 14; Amanuel Mesel / 16; (Tsegai Tewelde) / (17)	44
3rd place, bronze medalist(s)	Ethiopia: Imane Merga / 7; Demssew Tsega / 12; Abreham Cherkos / 15; Tola Bane / 20; (Habtamu Fikadu) / (28); (Ibrahim Jeilan) / (DNF)	54
4	Uganda	55
5	Burundi	102
6	Tanzania	104
7	Morocco	134
8	Sudan	176
Full results

- Note: Athletes in parentheses did not score for the team result.

=== Senior women's race (8 km) ===
Complete results for senior women and for senior women's teams were published.

Individual race
Rank	Athlete	Country	Time
1st place, gold medalist(s)	Lornah Kiplagat	Netherlands	26:23
2nd place, silver medalist(s)	Tirunesh Dibaba	Ethiopia	26:47
3rd place, bronze medalist(s)	Meselech Melkamu	Ethiopia	26:48
4	Gelete Burika	Ethiopia	26:55
5	Florence Jebet Kiplagat	Kenya	27:26
6	Pamela Chepchumba	Kenya	27:34
7	Priscah Jepleting Ngetich	Kenya	27:39
8	Vivian Cheruiyot	Kenya	28:10
9	Simret Sultan	Eritrea	28:16
10	Wude Ayalew	Ethiopia	28:18
11	Zhor El Kamch	Morocco	28:20
12	Jéssica Augusto	Portugal	28:21
Full results

Teams
Rank	Team	Points
1st place, gold medalist(s)	Ethiopia: Tirunesh Dibaba / 2; Meselech Melkamu / 3; Gelete Burika / 4; Wude Ayalew / 10; (Koren Jelela) / (19); (Mestawet Tufa) / (47)	19
2nd place, silver medalist(s)	Kenya: Florence Jebet Kiplagat / 5; Pamela Chepchumba / 6; Priscah Jepleting Ngetich / 7; Vivian Cheruiyot / 8; (Fridah Chepkemoi Domongole) / (13); (Emily Chebet) / (DNF)	26
3rd place, bronze medalist(s)	Morocco: Zhor El Kamch / 11; Mariem Alaoui Selsouli / 17; Hanane Ouhaddou / 33; Malika Benlafkir / 38; (Saïda El Mehdi) / (50); (Bouchra Chaâbi) / (DNF)	99
4	Spain	135
5	United Kingdom	140
6	Australia	154
7	Eritrea	162
8	United States	176
Full results

- Note: Athletes in parentheses did not score for the team result.

=== Junior women's race (6 km) ===
Complete results for junior women and for junior women's teams were published.

Aberu Kebede, who originally finished 16th as the fifth Ethiopian runner, was disqualified in 2022 due to age cheating. Though the disqualification did not affect medals, team scores were adjusted.

Individual race
Rank	Athlete	Country	Time
1st place, gold medalist(s)	Linet Chepkwemoi Barasa	Kenya	20:52
2nd place, silver medalist(s)	Mercy Jelimo Kosgei	Kenya	20:59
3rd place, bronze medalist(s)	Veronica Nyaruai Wanjiru	Kenya	21:10
4	Sule Utura	Ethiopia	21:13
5	Genzebe Dibaba	Ethiopia	21:23
6	Meraf Bahta	Eritrea	21:24
7	Gladys Jepkemoi Chemweno	Kenya	21:27
8	Furtuna Zegergish	Eritrea	21:31
9	Kokob Mehari	Eritrea	21:50
10	Yodit Mehari	Eritrea	21:51
11	Misato Tomoeda	Japan	21:51
12	Marie Imada	Japan	21:54
Full results

Teams
Rank	Team	Points
1st place, gold medalist(s)	Kenya: Linet Chepkwemoi Barasa / 1; Mercy Jelimo Kosgei / 2; Veronica Nyaruai Wanjiru / 3; Gladys Jepkemoi Chemweno / 7; (Mercy Cherono) / (22); (Pauline Chemning Korikwiang) / (DNF)	13
2nd place, silver medalist(s)	Eritrea: Meraf Bahta / 6; Furtuna Zegergish / 8; Kokob Mehari / 9; Yodit Mehari / 10	33
3rd place, bronze medalist(s)	Ethiopia: Sule Utura / 4; Genzebe Dibaba / 5; Abebu Gelan / 13; Bizunesh Urgesa / 14; (Aberu Kebede) / ~~(16)~~ DQ; (Emebt Etea) / (18)	36
4	Japan	59
5	United Kingdom	93
6	Uganda	117
7	Morocco	144
8	Burundi	151
Full results

- Note: Athletes in parentheses did not score for the team result.

== Medal table (unofficial) ==
* Host nation (Kenya)

Rank	Nation	Gold	Silver	Bronze	Total
1	Kenya*	5	4	3	12
2	Eritrea	1	2	0	3
3	Ethiopia	1	1	3	5
4	Netherlands	1	0	0	1
5	Morocco	0	1	1	2
6	Uganda	0	0	1	1
Totals (6 entries)		8	8	8	24

- Note: Totals include both individual and team medals, with medals in the team competition counting as one medal.

== Participation ==
According to an unofficial count, 470 athletes from 63 countries participated. This is in agreement with the official numbers as published. The announced athletes from the Democratic Republic of the Congo and Somalia did not show.

- Algeria (7)
- Angola (3)
- Australia (18)
- Austria (1)
- Bahrain (1)
- Botswana (5)
- Brazil (9)
- Burundi (12)
- Cameroon (1)
- Canada (11)
- China (4)
- Colombia (4)
- Côte d'Ivoire (1)
- Czech Republic (1)
- Djibouti (1)
- Egypt (2)
- Equatorial Guinea (1)
- Eritrea (23)
- Ethiopia (27)
- France (11)
- Gambia (1)
- Germany (5)
- Ghana (2)
- Guyana (1)
- Ireland (1)
- Italy (9)
- Japan (26)
- Kenya (27)
- Lesotho (2)
- Liberia (1)
- Luxembourg (1)
- Malawi (2)
- Mauritius (2)
- Morocco (27)
- Netherlands (1)
- New Zealand (5)
- Niger (1)
- Peru (4)
- Poland (2)
- Portugal (13)
- Qatar (10)
- Romania (1)
- Russia (7)
- Rwanda (12)
- Seychelles (1)
- Sierra Leone (2)
- South Africa (16)
- Spain (19)
- Sudan (9)
- Swaziland (2)
- Sweden (1)
- Switzerland (1)
- Tajikistan (2)
- Tanzania (24)
- Turkey (2)
- Uganda (26)
- United Arab Emirates (1)
- United Kingdom (25)
- United States (16)
- Venezuela (1)
- Yemen (4)
- Zambia (6)
- Zimbabwe (6)

== See also ==
- 2007 IAAF World Cross Country Championships – Senior men's race
- 2007 IAAF World Cross Country Championships – Junior men's race
- 2007 IAAF World Cross Country Championships – Senior women's race
- 2007 IAAF World Cross Country Championships – Junior women's race
- 2007 in athletics (track and field)
