= Chepkok =

Chepkok is a surname of Kenyan origin. Notable people with the surname include:

- Samuel Chepkok (born 1977), Kenyan distance runner and medallist at the 1996 IAAF World Cross Country Championships
- Vincent Chepkok (born 1988), Kenyan long-distance track runner
