= 2007 IAAF World Cross Country Championships – Junior women's race =

Junior women's race at the 2007 IAAF World Cross Country Championships
- Organisers: IAAF
- Edition: 35th
- Date: March 24
- Host city: Mombasa, Kenya
- Venue: Mombasa Golf Course
- Events: 1
- Distances: 6 km – Junior women
- Participation: 87 athletes from 28 nations

The Junior women's race at the 2007 IAAF World Cross Country Championships was held at the Mombasa Golf Course in Mombasa, Kenya, on March 24, 2007. Reports of the event were given in the Herald, and for the IAAF.

Complete results for individuals, and for teams were published.

Aberu Kebede, who originally finished 16th as the fifth Ethiopian runner, was disqualified in 2022 due to age cheating. Though the disqualification did not affect medals, team scores were adjusted.

== Race results ==
=== Junior women's race (6 km) ===
==== Individual ====
Rank	Athlete	Country	Time
1st place, gold medalist(s)	Linet Chepkwemoi Barasa	Kenya	20:52
2nd place, silver medalist(s)	Mercy Jelimo Kosgei	Kenya	20:59
3rd place, bronze medalist(s)	Veronica Nyaruai Wanjiru	Kenya	21:10
4	Sule Utura	Ethiopia	21:13
5	Genzebe Dibaba	Ethiopia	21:23
6	Meraf Bahta	Eritrea	21:24
7	Gladys Jepkemoi Chemweno	Kenya	21:27
8	Furtuna Zegergish	Eritrea	21:31
9	Kokob Mehari	Eritrea	21:50
10	Yodit Mehari	Eritrea	21:51
11	Misato Tomoeda	Japan	21:51
12	Marie Imada	Japan	21:54
13	Abebu Gelan	Ethiopia	21:54
14	Bizunesh Urgesa	Ethiopia	21:56
15	Charlotte Purdue	United Kingdom	22:00
16	Emily Pidgeon	United Kingdom	22:07
17	Atsuko Matsumura	Japan	22:10
18	Emebt Etea	Ethiopia	22:13
19	Aya Nagata	Japan	22:13
20	Viola Chemos	Uganda	22:27
21	Yoshie Maeda	Japan	22:30
22	Mercy Cherono	Kenya	22:32
23	Claudine Kwizera	Burundi	22:37
24	Yukari Sahaku	Japan	22:37
25	Jess Coulson	United Kingdom	22:38
26	Godeliève Nizigiyimana	Burundi	22:40
27	Joyce Nanzala	Uganda	22:54
28	Rachel Green	Australia	22:56
29	Danelle Woods	Canada	22:58
30	Mercy Chelangat	Uganda	23:00
31	Ikram Zouglali	Morocco	23:00
32	Khadija Afrayat	Morocco	23:02
33	Lucy Starrat	Australia	23:04
34	Durka Mana	Sudan	23:11
35	Lara Tamsett	Australia	23:15
36	Fatima Ouezzani	Morocco	23:20
37	Olivia Kenney	United Kingdom	23:22
38	Pauline Niyongere	Burundi	23:38
39	Sian Edwards	United Kingdom	23:41
40	Nancy Temuko	Uganda	23:44
41	Julie Collignon	France	23:53
42	Sarah Abu Hassan	Egypt	23:56
43	Radhia Juma	Tanzania	23:59
44	Theresia Joseph	Tanzania	24:00
45	Halima Hachlaf	Morocco	24:01
46	Betha Jacob	Tanzania	24:01
47	Juliet George	Tanzania	24:03
48	Praxedis Dim	South Africa	24:14
49	Helen Phenyane	South Africa	24:15
50	Rachel Cliff	Canada	24:15
51	Stevie Stockton	United Kingdom	24:21
52	Alita Phiri	South Africa	24:40
53	Melanie Cleland	New Zealand	24:43
54	Lindsay Carson	Canada	24:50
55	Maria Sgarbanti	Italy	24:52
56	Ainhoa Sanz	Spain	24:59
57	Luciana Viengo	Angola	24:59
58	Jessica Furlan	Canada	25:00
59	Asia Swalehe	Tanzania	25:09
60	Jane Tuge	South Africa	25:12
61	Makampong Masaile	Lesotho	25:29
62	Cjuiro Margot	Peru	25:29
63	Wahieba Abdelghani	Sudan	25:31
64	Francine Niyonizigiye	Burundi	25:59
65	Rihab Ahmed	Sudan	26:53
66	Thobile Ngwenyama	Eswatini	28:45
—	Izabela Trzaskalska	Poland	DNF
—	Viktoria Ivanova	Russia	DNF
—	Huillca Rocio	Peru	DNF
—	Yoni Ninahuaman	Peru	DNF
—	Cristina Jordán	Spain	DNF
—	Elizet Banda	Zambia	DNF
—	Joana Costa	Portugal	DNF
—	Chaisa Belen	Peru	DNF
—	Tereza Master	Malawi	DNF
—	Rabab Arafi	Morocco	DNF
—	Amanda Truelove	Canada	DNF
—	Doreen Chesang	Uganda	DNF
—	Stéphanie Nizigama	Burundi	DNF
—	Barkahoum Drici	Algeria	DNF
—	Amna Bursham	Sudan	DNF
—	Pauline Chemning Korikwiang	Kenya	DNF
—	Selina Mofokeng	South Africa	DNF
—	Sheila Reid	Canada	DNF
—	Mwanahawa Said	Tanzania	DNF
—	Aïcha Bani	Morocco	DNF
~~16~~	Aberu Kebede	Ethiopia	~~22:05~~ DQ

==== Teams ====
Rank	Team	Points
1st place, gold medalist(s)	Kenya: Linet Chepkwemoi Barasa / 1; Mercy Jelimo Kosgei / 2; Veronica Nyaruai Wanjiru / 3; Gladys Jepkemoi Chemweno / 7; (Mercy Cherono) / (22); (Pauline Chemning Korikwiang) / (DNF)	13
2nd place, silver medalist(s)	Eritrea: Meraf Bahta / 6; Furtuna Zegergish / 8; Kokob Mehari / 9; Yodit Mehari / 10	33
3rd place, bronze medalist(s)	Ethiopia: Sule Utura / 4; Genzebe Dibaba / 5; Abebu Gelan / 13; Bizunesh Urgesa / 14; (Emebt Etea) / (18); (Aberu Kebede) / ~~(16)~~ DQ	36
4	Japan: Misato Tomoeda / 11; Marie Imada / 12; Atsuko Matsumura / 17; Aya Nagata / 19; (Yoshie Maeda) / (21); (Yukari Sahaku) / (24)	59
5	United Kingdom: Charlotte Purdue / 15; Emily Pidgeon / 16; Jess Coulson / 25; Olivia Kenney / 37; (Sian Edwards) / (39); (Stevie Stockton) / (51)	93
6	Uganda: Viola Chemos / 20; Joyce Nanzala / 27; Mercy Chelangat / 30; Nancy Temuko / 40; (Doreen Chesang) / (DNF)	117
7	Morocco: Ikram Zouglali / 31; Khadija Afrayat / 32; Fatima Ouezzani / 36; Halima Hachlaf / 45; (Aïcha Bani) / (DNF); (Rabab Arafi) / (DNF)	144
8	Burundi: Claudine Kwizera / 23; Godeliève Nizigiyimana / 26; Pauline Niyongere / 38; Francine Niyonizigiye / 64; (Stéphanie Nizigama) / (DNF)	151
9	Tanzania: Radhia Juma / 43; Theresia Joseph / 44; Betha Jacob / 46; Juliet George / 47; (Asia Swalehe) / (59); (Mwanahawa Said) / (DNF)	180
10	Canada: Danelle Woods / 29; Rachel Cliff / 50; Lindsay Carson / 54; Jessica Furlan / 58; (Amanda Truelove) / (DNF); (Sheila Reid) / (DNF)	191
11	South Africa: Praxedis Dim / 48; Helen Phenyane / 49; Alita Phiri / 52; Jane Tuge / 60; (Selina Mofokeng) / (DNF)	209

- Note: Athletes in parentheses did not score for the team result.

== Participation ==
According to an unofficial count, 87 athletes from 28 countries participated in the Junior women's race. This is in agreement with the official numbers as published.

- Algeria (1)
- Angola (1)
- Australia (3)
- Burundi (5)
- Canada (6)
- Egypt (1)
- Eritrea (4)
- Ethiopia (6)
- France (1)
- Italy (1)
- Japan (6)
- Kenya (6)
- Lesotho (1)
- Malawi (1)
- Morocco (6)
- New Zealand (1)
- Peru (4)
- Poland (1)
- Portugal (1)
- Russia (1)
- South Africa (5)
- Spain (2)
- Sudan (4)
- Eswatini (1)
- Tanzania (6)
- Uganda (5)
- United Kingdom (6)
- Zambia (1)

== See also ==
- 2007 IAAF World Cross Country Championships – Senior men's race
- 2007 IAAF World Cross Country Championships – Junior men's race
- 2007 IAAF World Cross Country Championships – Senior women's race
