= Abebu Gelan =

Ethiopian long-distance runner

Medal record

Women's athletics

Representing Ethiopia

IAAF World Half Marathon Championships
Gold medal – first place	2008 Rio	Team

Abebu Gelan Adugna (born 18 January 1990) is an Ethiopian female long-distance runner who competes mainly in road running competitions. She has represented Ethiopia three times internationally, competing as a junior at the IAAF World Cross Country Championships in 2007, then twice as a senior at the IAAF World Half Marathon Championships (2008, 2009). She was a team gold medallist at the 2008 World Half Marathon. Her half marathon best of 67:57 minutes was achieved in 2009. This time was a world junior best for the distance.

She won the Agadir Half Marathon and Cross de l'Acier races in 2008, then had further wins in 2009 in North America at the Rock 'n' Roll Virginia Beach Half Marathon and Vancouver Sun Run. Her best half marathon race came at the RAK Half Marathon in 2009, where she was fourth. In 2009, she also had top three finishes at the Azalea Trail Run and Crescent City Classic. After a break in competition, she returned in 2013 with a focus on longer distances. She failed to match her previous performances at 10K and the half marathon and instead made progress in the marathon, having a winning debut at the Belgrade Marathon with a run of 2:33:14 hours. She was runner-up on her next outing at the Košice Peace Marathon but returned to the top of the podium at the 2016 Brescia Marathon.

== International competitions ==
Year	Competition	Venue	Position	Event	Notes
2007	World Cross Country Championships	Mombasa, Kenya	13th	Junior race	21:54
2007	World Cross Country Championships	Mombasa, Kenya	3rd	Junior team	36 pts
2008	World Half Marathon Championships	Rio de Janeiro, Brazil	6th	Half marathon	1:10:59
2008	World Half Marathon Championships	Rio de Janeiro, Brazil	1st	Team	3:30:59
2009	World Half Marathon Championships	Birmingham, United Kingdom	21st	Half marathon	1:11:33

== Circuit wins ==
- Brescia Marathon: 2016
- Belgrade Marathon: 2015
- Rock 'n' Roll Virginia Beach Half Marathon: 2009
- Vancouver Sun Run: 2009
- Agadir Half Marathon: 2008
- Cross de l'Acier: 2008

== Personal bests ==
- 10K run – 32:04 min (2008)
- Half marathon – 1:07:57 (2009)
- Marathon – 2:33:14 (2015)
