= Serena Burla =

American long-distance runner

Personal information
- Born: September 27, 1982 (age 43) Waukesha, Wisconsin

Sport
- Country: United States
- Sport: Athletics
- Event: Marathon
Medal record
Representing United States
Women's Athletics

Serena Burla (born September 27, 1982) is an American track and field athlete from St. Louis, specializing in long-distance running events.

== Career ==
In college, Burla was a two-time Big 12 Conference runner-up for the Missouri Tigers.

Burla competed in the 2009 IAAF World Half Marathon Championships where she finished 16th (upgraded from 17th place after suspension of Inga Abitova). In 2010, Burla was diagnosed with cancer and had a tumor and the dominant muscle removed from her right hamstring. Eight months after her surgery, Burla returned to competitive running. In 2011, she ran the New York City Marathon in 2:37 and qualified for 2012 Summer Olympic trials. During trials, Burla collapsed at mile 18 and was carried off the track.

In 2013, Burla ran the Boston Marathon. Burla won the 2013 USA Half Marathon Championships (held as part of the Houston Half Marathon).

At the 2015 World Championships in Athletics in Beijing, Burla placed 10th in the marathon with a time of 2:31:06.

Burla ran a Marathon PR of 2:26:53 to finish 4th in the 2017 Osaka Women's Marathon. That same year, she finished 11th in the world championship marathon in London. Later that week, her management team put out a release that her cancer had returned.
