= Andrew Lemoncello =

Scottish long-distance runner

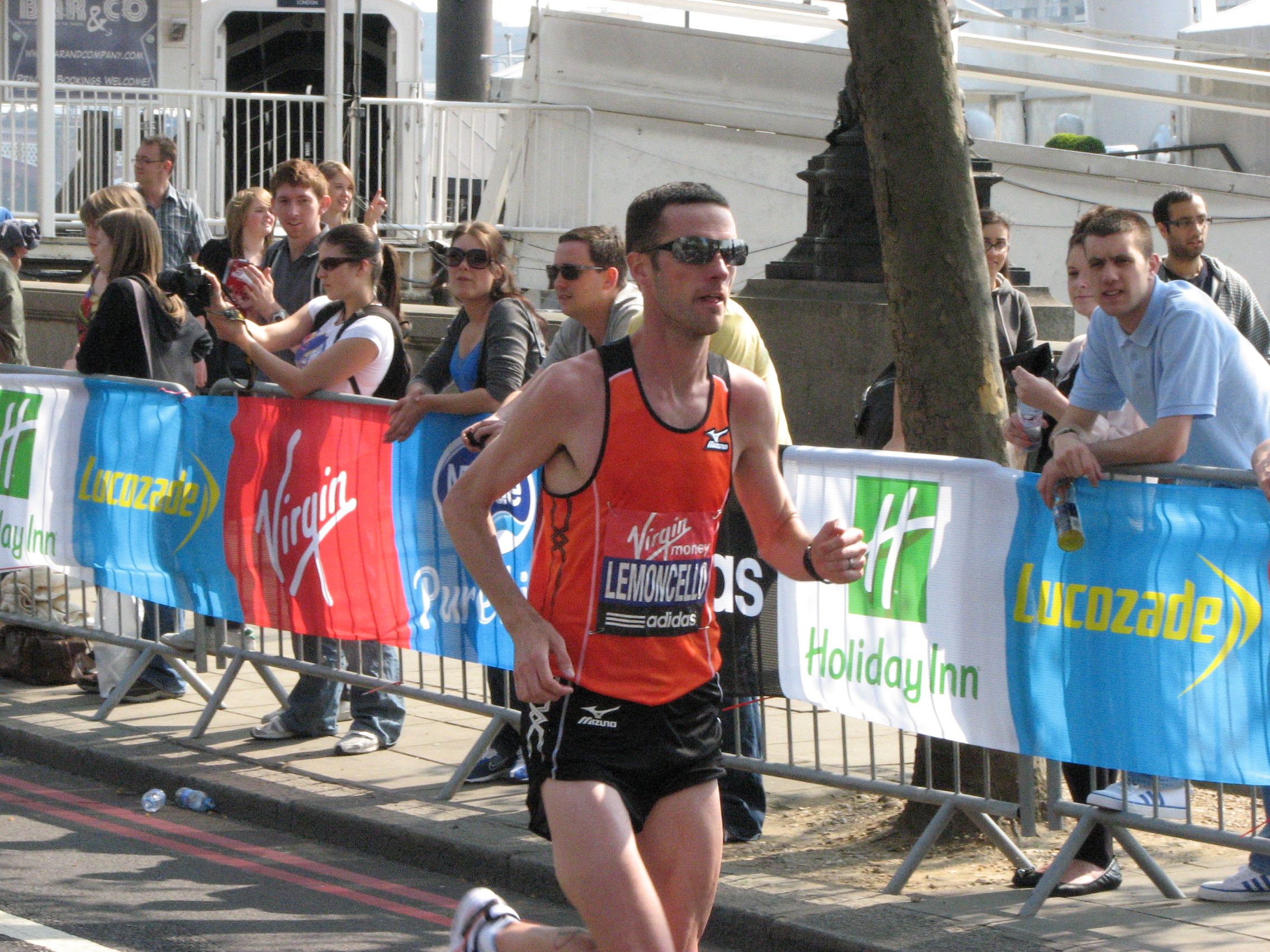
- Lemoncello at the 2011 London Marathon

Personal information
- Nationality: British (Scottish)
- Born: 12 October 1982 (age 43) Tokyo, Japan
- Height: 186 cm (6 ft 1 in)
- Weight: 67 kg (148 lb)

Sport
- Sport: Athletics
- Event: Steeplechase
- Club: Fife Athletic Club

Andrew Lemoncello (born 12 October 1982) is a Scottish former long-distance runner who competed in the 3000 metres steeplechase and the marathon events. He won a team junior gold medal at the 2001 European Cross Country Championships and won a scholarship to attend Florida State University in 2004. At Florida State he was second in the NCAA Men's Outdoor Track and Field Championship in the steeplechase.

He represented Great Britain at the World Championships in Athletics in 2005 and 2007. He ran in the steeplechase event at the 2008 Summer Olympics. Lemoncello completed his debut marathon in 2010, finishing eighth in the London Marathon.

== Early life ==
Born on 12 October 1982 in Tokyo, Japan, to an American father and Scottish mother, Lemoncello grew up in Ceres, Scotland, where he attended Madras College. While at Madras College, he broke all distance running records and still held them in 2007. After school he attended Stirling University and continued his progress at the on-campus Scottish Institute of Sport. Throughout this time he was an active runner for the Fife Athletics Club. While at Madras and Stirling he won the Scottish National Championship sixteen times, he was a member of the gold winning European Cross Country team, came third at the 2004 British University Cross Country Championships, finished eighth at the World Mountain Running Championships 2004 and was the British University Champion in the 5000 m and 10000 m events.

== College athletics ==
Due to his outstanding performances and promise, Lemoncello gained a scholarship to study at Florida State University (FSU) in Tallahassee in 2004. Lemoncello was an instant success, winning the ACC performer of the week at his first outing for FSU.

In his first year at FSU he led the team to first place at the Florida Intercollegiate Championships. He also came only one second short of the university's 8000 m record. At the NCAA South Regional Championships, Lemoncello was fifth and led his college team, "The Seminoles", to first place. At the national NCAA Championships, Lemoncello was the Seminoles' top scorer, finishing 50th in the 10,000 m run.

In 2005, Lemoncello continued his outstanding form, winning the 5,000 m and 10,000 m titles at the 2005 Atlantic Coast Conference Outdoor Track Championship. He also became FSU all-time record holder for the 3,000 m steeplechase by shattering the 29-year-old record by more than 15 seconds. He also won the ACC indoor 3000 m steeplechase title. Lemoncello ended the season rated 2nd in the region and 12th in the US at the 10,000 m.

Lemoncello maintained his form in the 2006 season, breaking four more FSU records to hold five (cross country 8,000 m, indoor 5,000 m, outdoor 5,000 m, 3,000 m steeplechase and the 10,000 m). He led the field from start to finish to win the ACC 3,000 m steeplechase title. At the NCAA, Lemoncello was 12th in the 5,000 m, 5th in the 10,000 m and second in the steeplechase. Lemoncello joined the McMillanElite training group based in Flagstaff, Arizona in 2007, under the direction of coach Greg McMillan.

Lemoncello had to withdraw from the 2006 Commonwealth Games in Australia due to commitments at FSU. He had exams and the NCAA Indoor Championships in the days leading up to the games and would not have had sufficient time to acclimatise to perform at his best.

== Professional ==
He competed in the steeplechase at the 2005 World Championships in Athletics but did not progress beyond the heats. He returned for the 2007 World Championships but again did not go past the heat stage. He made the world championship team after running 27:57 in the 10,000m at Brutus Hamilton Invitational on the track. Lemoncello ran in the senior race at the 2008 IAAF World Cross Country Championships and finished in 78th place. He represented Great Britain at the 2008 Summer Olympics, again being knocked out in the heats of the steeplechase. He took part in the 2009 IAAF World Half Marathon Championships in Birmingham and was 26th. He closed the year with a 29th-place finish at the 2009 European Cross Country Championships.

Lemoncello made his marathon debut in April 2010 at the London Marathon. He finished in a time of 2:13:40 for eighth place, the first European man to cross the line. In September 2010, he competed in the Great Yorkshire Run in Sheffield and finished in fourth place with a time of 29:08 minutes.

== Achievements ==
- Lemoncello wins Stirling Scottish Marathon 21 May 2017 2:25:01
- Lemoncello placed 12th at the 2014 Commonwealth Games 10,000m running for Scotland
- Lemoncello qualified for the 2006 Commonwealth Games running for Scotland
- Qualified for the European and World Championships running for Great Britain
- 2nd in the NCAA in the 3000m steeple, 12th in the NCAA in the 5000m and 5th among all 10K runners in the NCAA in 2006
- Lemoncello was selected to run for Great Britain at the 2008 Beijing Olympic Games in the 3,000m steeplechase, finishing 9th in round 1.
- Set a new World Record on 19 October 2013 for 1/2 marathon on treadmill in a time of 1:07:29, breaking the previous record by 1 minute.
- Rear of the Year runner-up in 2008

== Personal bests ==
Distance	Time	Date	Event
800 m	1:55.2	2003	Wishaw
1500 m	3:45.68	2009	Sun Angel Track Classic
Mile	4:03.22	2007	Celtic Cup, Grangemouth
3000 m indoor	8:00.09	2007	New Balance Invitational, New York
3000 m steeplechase	8:22.95	2008	Meeting Gaz De France Golden League
5000 m	13:33.01	2009	Payton Jordan Cardinal Invitational
10,000 m	27:57.23	2009	Brutus Hamilton Memorial
Half marathon	63:03	2009	IAAF World Half Marathon Championships
Half marathon	61.52	2009	Austin Half Marathon (downhill course)
