= Issak Sibhatu =

Eritrean long-distance runner

Issak Sibhatu (born 12 March 1989) is an Eritrean long-distance runner who specializes in the 5000 metres and cross-country running.

He was born in Adiblay. As a junior, he competed in the junior races at the IAAF World Cross Country Championships, finishing sixth in 2007 and sixteenth in 2008. He finished fifth in the 3000 metres at the 2005 World Youth Championships.

As a senior, he finished 24th at the 2009 World Cross Country Championships. The Eritrean team took bronze medals in the team competition; however Sibhatu's placement was too low to count in the team points.

His personal best times are 3:39.71 minutes in the 1500 metres, achieved in July 2008 in Madrid; 8:07.34 minutes in the 3000 metres, achieved in May 2005 in Arusha; and 13:24.10 minutes in the 5000 metres, achieved in June 2009 in Lugano.
