= Koren Jelela =

Ethiopian long-distance runner

Koren Jelela, also known as Koren Jelila Yal, (born 18 January 1987 in Shewa) is an Ethiopian long-distance runner.

== Career ==
At the 2007 World Cross Country Championships she finished nineteenth in the senior race. With four Ethiopian runners ahead of her she missed out for a place on the victorious Ethiopian team. The same thing happened in 2008, when Jelela finished fourteenth individually. She was less successful at the 2009 edition, as she finished in 30th place. She chose to move away from cross country running and switch her focus to the road. On her debut over the marathon distance at the Venice Marathon in 2009, she finished as the runner-up with a time of 2:28:41 hours, second to veteran Kenyan athlete Anne Kosgei. That November she entered the Great Ethiopian Run held in Addis Ababa and won the 10 km race with a course record time of 33:03 minutes.

She competed at the RAK Half Marathon the following February and made the top ten with a run of 1:10:52. She was announced as one of the elite foreign competitors for the 2010 Boston Marathon in April, but she failed to match her Venice performance and finished in twelfth place some five minutes off her personal best pace. She made an appearance over 10 km at the World 10K Bangalore the following month and took fourth position. In her second full distance race of the year, she came fourth at the Toronto Waterfront Marathon with a best run of 2:24:33. She closed her year in Nigeria with a fifth-place finish at the African Mountain Running Championships hosted by the Obudo Ranch Race that November.

She opened 2011 at the Mumbai Marathon and she won in course record time. Her mark of 2:26:56 was also the fastest marathon ever run by a woman in India. In April she took on the Paris Marathon and placed top-three behind Kenyans Priscah Jeptoo and Agnes Kiprop. She returned to India for the World 10K Bangalore and finished just outside the top three behind Belaynesh Oljira in an Ethiopian sweep of the top four. She was a back-up runner for the Ethiopian team at the 2011 World Championships in Athletics, but ultimately did not compete. In October she won the Toronto Waterfront Marathon ahead of her compatriot Mare Dibaba – Koren reached the halfway mark in a quick time of 1:08:38 hours, but slowed in the second half to finish the race in a personal best time of 2:22:43 hours.

The next year, her best run came at the 2012 London Marathon, although her time of 2:28:05 was only enough for twelfth. She was one second slower at the Istanbul Marathon, but the race was more tactical and she came out on top to win the race.

== Personal bests ==
- 3000 metres - 9:12.26 min (2007)
- 5000 metres - 15:51.81 min (2007)
- 10 km (road) - 31:55 min (2010)
- Half marathon - 1:08:38 hrs (2011)
- Marathon - 2:22:43 hrs (2011)
