= Takuya Nakayama =

Japanese basketball player (born 1994)

Takuya Nakayama 中山拓哉
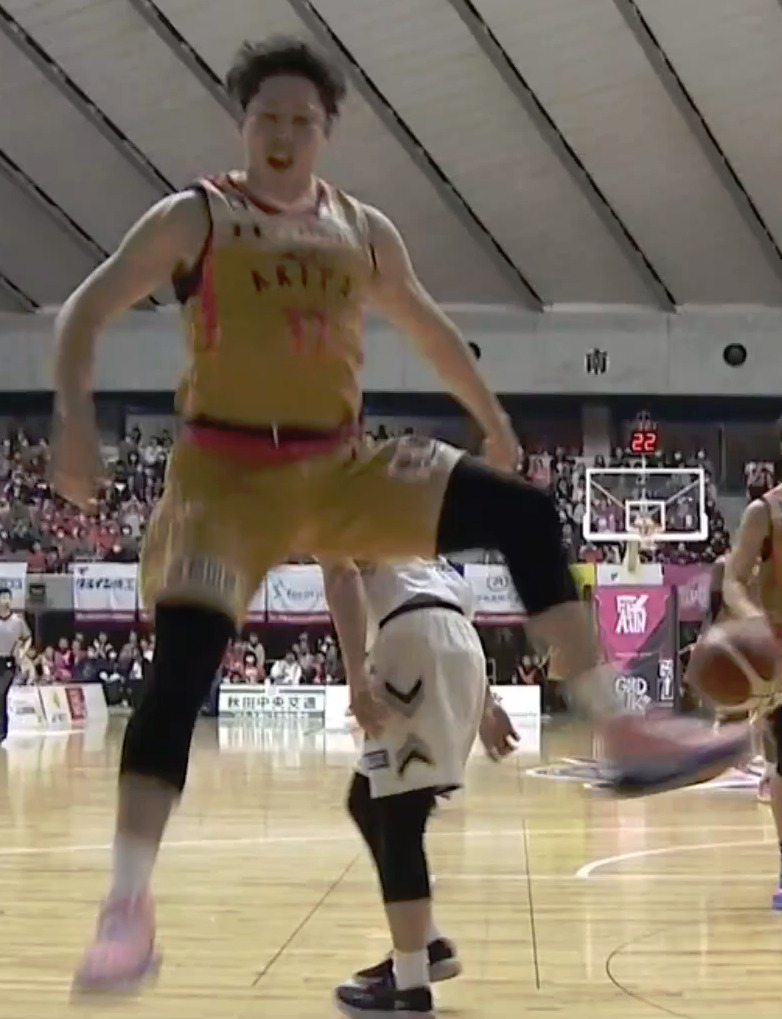
- Nakayama at Akita Prefectural Gymnasium

No. 17 – Akita Northern Happinets
- Position: Point guard / shooting guard
- League: B.League

Personal information
- Born: July 24, 1994 (age 32) Izumi-ku, Yokohama, Kanagawa, Japan
- Listed height: 5 ft 11.8 in (1.82 m)
- Listed weight: 187 lb (85 kg)

Career information
- High school: Tokai University Sagami (Sagamihara, Kanagawa)
- College: Tokai University (2013–2017)
- Playing career: 2017–present

Career history
- 2017–present: Akita Northern Happinets

Career highlights
- B1 Steal leader (2018-19); B2 Steal leader (2017-18); B.League All-Star (2018); All Japan Intercollegiate Basketball Championship MVP (2016); All Japan Intercollegiate Basketball Championship Assist leader (2016)

Takuya Nakayama (born July 24, 1994) is a Japanese professional basketball player who plays for the Akita Northern Happinets of the B.League in Japan. He wears #17 because his mother, Yuko was born on the 17th day of the month. On April 22, 2017, Nakayama made the longest shot of the B.League at first quarter buzzer beater. On December 30, 2017, he hit another longest shot of the league at the third quarter buzzer beater.

== B.League Multiple-time steal leader ==
He won the Steal leader award two years in a row.

== Career statistics ==
Legend
GP	Games played	GS	Games started	MPG	Minutes per game
FG%	Field goal percentage	3P%	3-point field goal percentage	FT%	Free throw percentage
RPG	Rebounds per game	APG	Assists per game	SPG	Steals per game
BPG	Blocks per game	PPG	Points per game	**Bold**	Career high

*	Led the league

=== Regular season ===
Year	Team	GP	GS	MPG	FG%	3P%	FT%	RPG	APG	SPG	BPG	PPG
2016-17	Akita	22	5	16.5	45.9	40.7	66.7	2.0	1.2	0.9	0.1	4.7
2017-18	Akita	56	44	24	45.7	31.7	59.4	4.3	3.8	2.1*	0.1	8.5
2018-19	Akita	58	44	29.9	40.8	18.5	62.2	4.8	5.4	2.2*	0.1	7.3
2019-20	Akita	32	17	23.7	46.7	29.4	59.6	3.7	3.6	2.1	0.0	6.7
2020-21	Akita	56	21	22.8	.405	.256	.724	3.5	3.2	1.5	0.0	6.8

=== Playoffs ===
Year	Team	GP	GS	MPG	FG%	3P%	FT%	RPG	APG	SPG	BPG	PPG
2016-17	Akita	2		23.0	.500	.333	1.000	2.0	0.5	2.0	0	5.5
2017-18	Akita	5	3	20:37	.265	.250	.500	5.4	3.4	1.4	0	4.4

=== Early cup games ===
Year	Team	GP	GS	MPG	FG%	3P%	FT%	RPG	APG	SPG	BPG	PPG
2017	Akita	2	1	18:22	.385	.167	1.000	4.5	1.5	1.5	0	5.0
2018	Akita	2	2	27:49	.444	.000	.500	5.0	3.0	3.5	0	5.5
2019	Akita	2	2	25:14	.333	1.000	1.000	5.5	1.5	1.0	0.5	3.5

=== Preseason games ===
Year	Team	GP	GS	MPG	FG%	3P%	FT%	RPG	APG	SPG	BPG	PPG
2018	Akita	2	1	27.4	.100	.000	1.000	4.0	5.0	2.5	0.0	3.0
2019	Akita	3	1	21.9	.412	.000	.857	2.3	4.3	4.3	0.0	5.7

Source: Changwon1Changwon2 Source: UtsunomiyaToyamaSendai

== Outfits ==
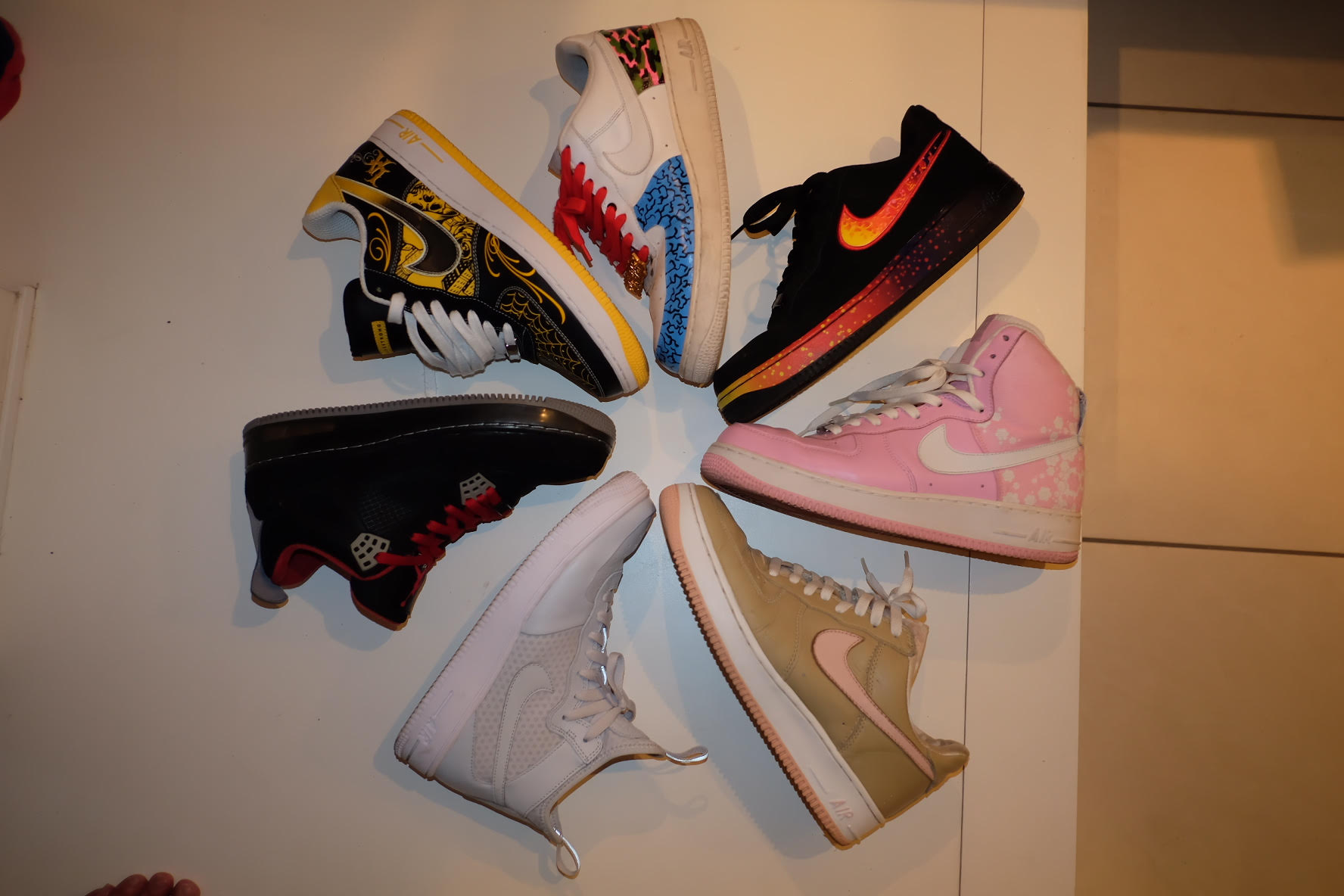
Nike Air Force 1

He plays with Nike Kyrie Low 2 basketball shoes and Stance socks and wears Air Force 1 Foamposite Pro Cup shoes on the Akita's snowy streets.

== Shē pass ==
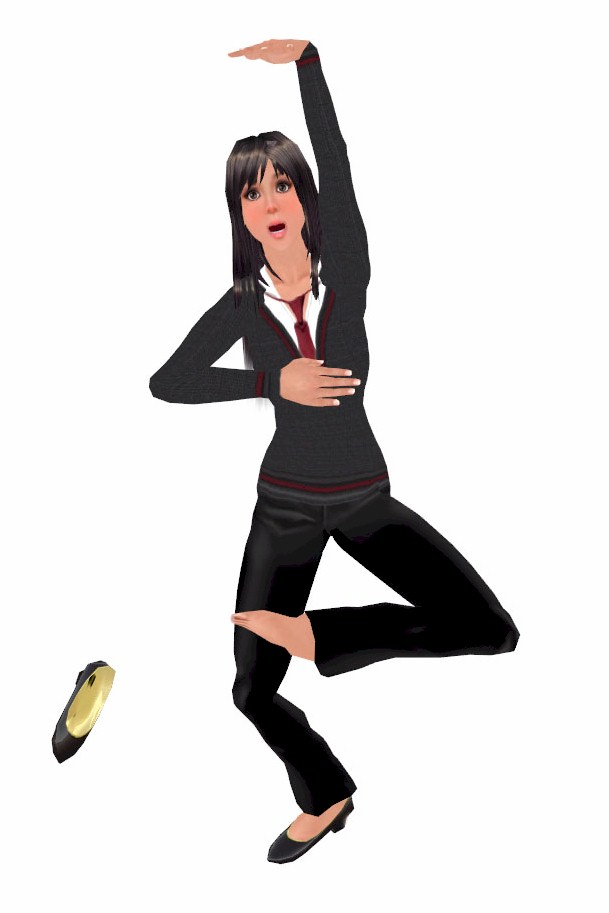
Shē pose

His one-handed overhead pass to his side is called "Sheeeh! pass", because it looks like Sheeeh! pose in Japanese cartoon, Osomatsu-kun.
