= Tsegai Tewelde =

Eritrean-born British distance runner (born 1989)

Tsegai Tewelde (born 8 December 1989) is an Eritrean-born British distance runner, who competed in the marathon at the 2016 Summer Olympics.

== Personal life ==
Tewelde was born in Eritrea on 8 December 1989. At the age of eight, he was injured in a land mine explosion that killed a friend of his, leaving him with a scar on his forehead after he was hit by shrapnel.

In 2008, he and six other members of the Eritrean team sought political asylum in the United Kingdom following the World Cross Country Championships in Edinburgh. The athletes feared they would be tortured or face military service for failing to finish higher in the event. He was granted a British passport in the autumn of 2015.

== Athletics ==
Tewelde competed at the 2006 World Junior Championships in Athletics in the 1500 metres, finishing fifth in a time of 3 minutes 42.10 seconds and setting a national junior record. In 2007 he placed 17th in the junior's race at the World Cross Country Championships.

At the 2008 World Championships he finished 19th in the junior's race in a time of 23 minutes and 48 seconds. Following this race he applied for asylum in the UK. He later joined Shettleston Harriers athletics club, he return home after becoming British and trained hard for his london marathon

In 2015 he finished Great Scottish Run in a time of 1 hour 3 minutes and 34 seconds, taking fourth place overall and the silver medal for Scottish athletes.

At the 2016 London Marathon, competing over the distance for the first time, Tewelde finished twelfth overall, and was the second British-qualified athlete to finish, in a time of 2 hours 12 minutes and 57 seconds. This time was inside the qualifying time of 2 hours 14 minutes needed to earn him a place in the Great Britain team for the 2016 Summer Olympics to be held in Rio de Janeiro, Brazil. He did not finish (DNF) in the men's marathon, while fellow British athletes, brothers Callum and Derek Hawkins finished 9th and 114th respectively.

== Personal Bests ==
| Distance | Mark | Date | Location |
|---|---|---|---|
| 1,500 metres | 3:42.10 | 2006 | Beijing |
| 5,000 metres | 14:23.63 | 2009 | Dunfermline |
| 10K Run | 29:24 | 2009 | Sunderland |
| Half Marathon | 1:03:18 | 2017 | Glasgow |
| Marathon | 2:12:23 | 2016 | London |
