= Gedion Ngatuny =

Kenyan long-distance runner (born 1986)

Gideon Lekumok Ngatuny (born 10 October 1986) is a Kenyan long-distance runner.

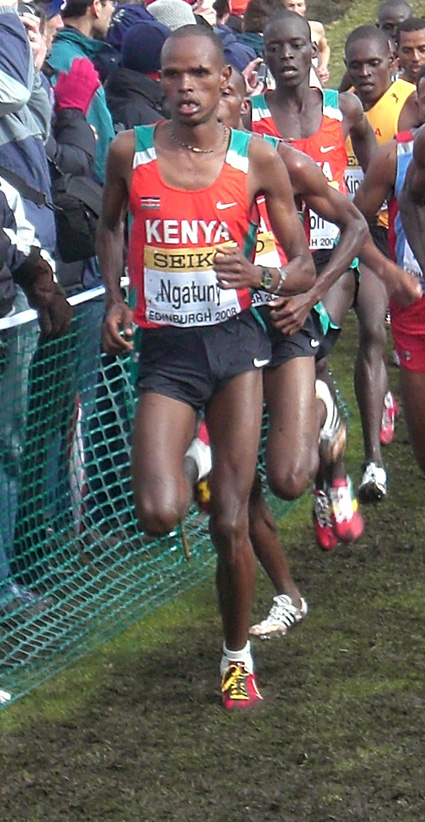
Gideon Lekumok Ngatuny in 2008

At the 2007 World Cross Country Championships he finished fourth in the senior race, while the Kenyan team of which Ngatuny was a part won the team competition. Ngatuny won the 2008 Kenyan World Cross trials, and at the 2008 World Cross Country Championships he finished seventh individually and won another team gold medal. He won the 2009 Sapporo Half Marathon title with a time of 1:00:39.

He is from Kilgoris, but trains at the Gusii Stadium located in Kisii. He represents the Maasai tribe.

== Personal bests ==
- 5000 metres - 13:12.62 min (2007)
- 10,000 metres - 27:11.36 min (2007)
