= Rui Teixeira =

Portuguese long-distance runner

Personal information
- Born: 22 March 1982 (age 43)

Sport
- Country: Portugal
- Sport: Long-distance running

Rui Teixeira (born 22 March 1982) is a Portuguese long-distance runner. In 2019, he competed in the senior men's race at the 2019 IAAF World Cross Country Championships held in Aarhus, Denmark. He finished in 42nd place.
