= Isabel Checa =

Spanish long-distance runner

Personal information
- Full name: Isabel Checa Porcel
- Nationality: Spain
- Born: 27 December 1982 (age 43) Silla, Valencia, Spain
- Height: 1.60 m (5 ft 3 in)
- Weight: 55 kg (121 lb)

Sport
- Sport: Athletics
- Event: Long-distance running
- Club: Tossal Silla Alacant
- Coached by: Francisco Serrano

Achievements and titles
- Personal bests: 3000 m: 9:02.26; 5000 m: 15:26.57; 10,000 m: 32:07.78

Isabel Checa Porcel (born December 27, 1982, in Silla, Valencia) is a Spanish long-distance runner. Checa represented Spain at the 2008 Summer Olympics in Beijing, where she competed for the women's 10,000 metres. She finished the race in twenty-ninth place by fourteen seconds behind China's Dong Xiaoqin, with a time of 33:17.88.

Checa is the twin sister of long-distance runner Dolores Checa, who also competed for the women's 5000 metres at the 2008 Summer Olympics.
