= Bernard Kipyego =

Kenyan marathon runner (born 1986)

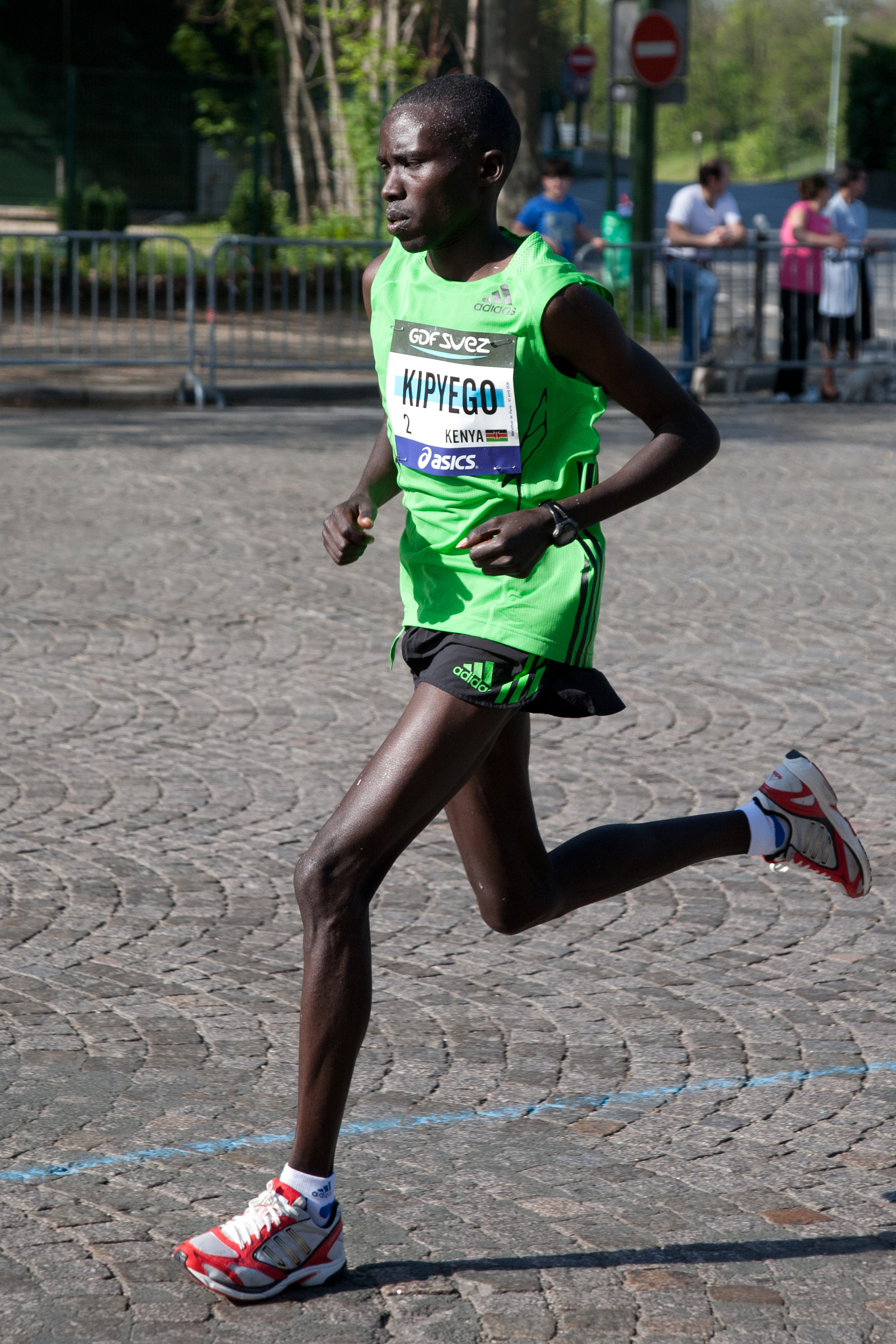
Kipyego at the 2011 Paris Marathon

Bernard Kiprop Kipyego (born 16 July 1986 in Keiyo District) is a Kenyan long-distance runner who competes in the marathon. His personal best for the event is 2:06:22 hours. He has reached the podium at the Amsterdam Marathon, Chicago Marathon, Boston Marathon, Paris Marathon and Tokyo Marathon.

He was the bronze medallist at the 2007 IAAF World Cross Country Championships and took the silver medal at the 2009 IAAF World Half Marathon Championships.

== Career ==
Kipyego's first international highlight came as a junior at the 2005 IAAF World Cross Country Championships, where he took the silver medal in the junior race to form a Kenyan sweep of the medals, alongside Augustine Choge and Barnabas Kosgei. At the 2007 World Cross Country Championships he won the bronze medal in the senior race, while the Kenyan team of which he was a part won the team competition. In 2008 he finished tenth individually, and won another team gold medal. He also competed at the 2008 IAAF World Athletics Final that year, taking eighth place in the 5000 metres on the track.

Kipyego won the 10-mile Great South Run competition, taking the title with a time of 46:42. He won the 2009 Berlin Half Marathon by timing 59:34, and was third at the World 10K Bangalore that year. It was his debut half marathon. He competed at the 2009 World Championships, finishing 5th in the 10,000 metres race. He won the silver medal at the 2009 IAAF World Half Marathon Championships. Kipyego made his marathon debut in 2010 at the Rotterdam Marathon and finished fifth in a time of 2:07:01. He was runner-up at the Lille Half Marathon in September, losing out on the title to Wilson Kiprop by one second. This served as his preparation for the 2010 Berlin Marathon, where he ran a time of 2:08:50 for sixth place

His first outing of 2011 came at the RAK Half Marathon and he took second place with a sub-hour clocking of 59:45 minutes. He approached his best time at the 2011 Paris Marathon, where he was the runner-up behind Benjamin Kiptoo. He was among the fastest entrants at the 2011 Chicago Marathon and ran a personal best of 2:06:29 hours to take third place in a Kenyan podium sweep alongside Moses Mosop and Wesley Korir.

He returned to the RAK Half Marathon in 2012 but only managed fourth place on that occasion. Warm weather at the 2012 Boston Marathon led to a tactical race where Kipyego moved up the field in the final stages to claim third place. Competing in Illinois for a second year running, he failed to make the podium at the 2012 Chicago Marathon, placing sixth, although his finishing time of 2:06:40 was still fast.

He was third behind his namesake Michael Kipyego at the 2013 Tokyo Marathon. He entered the marathon at the 2013 World Championships in Athletics but managed only twelfth place with a time of 2:14:01 hours. He ran much faster at the Beijing Marathon in October, finishing as runner-up to Tadese Tola with a time of 2:07:19 hours.

He won his first major marathon in Amsterdam in 2014 with a personal best time of 2:06:22 hours.

He has four children with his wife Esily.

== Achievements ==
Year	Competition	Venue	Position	Event
2005	World Cross Country Championships	St Etienne, France	2nd	Junior race
2007	World Cross Country Championships	Mombasa, Kenya	3rd	Long race
2007	World Cross Country Championships	Mombasa, Kenya	1st	Team
2008	World Cross Country Championships	Edinburgh, Scotland	10th	Long race
2008	World Cross Country Championships	Edinburgh, Scotland	1st	Team
2008	World Athletics Final	Stuttgart, Germany	9th	5000 m
2009	World Championships	Berlin, Germany	5th	10,000 m
2009	World Half Marathon Championships	Birmingham, United Kingdom	2nd	Half marathon
2014	Amsterdam Marathon	Amsterdam, The Netherlands	1st	Marathon
2015	Amsterdam Marathon	Amsterdam, The Netherlands	1st	Marathon

== Personal bests ==
- 3000 metres - 7:50.57 min (2006)
- 5000 metres - 13:09.96 min (2005)
- 10,000 metres - 26:59.61 min (2007)
- Half marathon - 59.10 min (2009)
- Marathon - 2:06:19 (2015)
