= Martin Toroitich =

Ugandan long-distance runner (born 1983)

Martin Kitiyo Toroitich (born 10 August 1983 in Kurongur) is a Ugandan long-distance runner who specializes in the half marathon.

His younger brother Boniface Kiprop Toroitich is a successful Ugandan runner.

== Achievements ==
Year	Competition	Venue	Position	Event	Notes
Representing Uganda
1998	World Junior Championships	Annecy, France	—	10,000m	DNF
2004	World Half Marathon Championships	New Delhi, India	13th	Half marathon	1:04:48
2006	World Road Running Championships	Debrecen, Hungary	13th	20 km	58:26
2006	World Road Running Championships	Debrecen, Hungary	5th	Team	2:55:27
2007	World Cross Country Championships	Mombasa, Kenya	10th	Long race (12 km)	37:31

=== Personal bests ===
- 3000 metres - 8:19.67 min (2002)
- 5000 metres - 13:34.84 min (2002)
- 10,000 metres - 28:08.32 min (2004)
- Half marathon - 1:03:52 hrs (2002)
