= Samuel Tsegay =

Eritrean long-distance runner

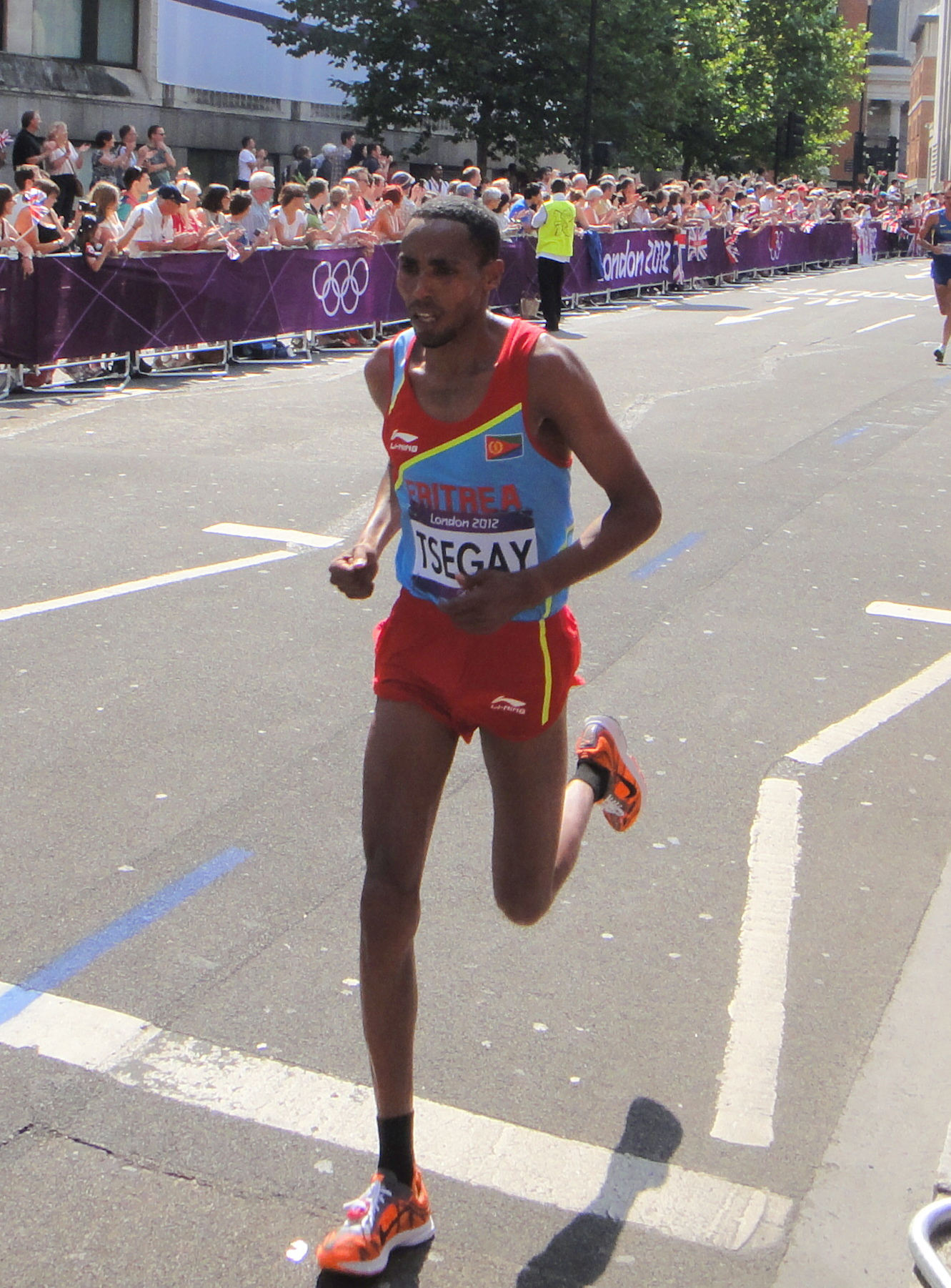
- Samuel Tsegay in the marathon at the 2012 Summer Olympics

Personal information
- Born: February 24, 1988 (age 38) Ethiopia
- Height: 1.76 m (5 ft 9 1/2 in)
- Weight: 59 kg (130 lb)

Sport
- Country: Eritrea
- Sport: Athletics
- Event: Marathon
- Updated on 22 July 2012

Samuel Tsegay Tesfamriam (born 24 February 1988) is an Eritrean long-distance runner running for the Swedish track club Hälle IF and currently going through the process of acquiring Swedish citizenship, who specializes in the 5000 metres and 10,000 metres. As a junior, he competed in the junior races at the IAAF World Cross Country Championships, finishing seventeenth in 2005, eighth in 2006 and eighth in 2007. He finished fourth in the 10,000 metres at the 2006 World Junior Championships.

At the 2009 World Cross Country Championships he finished sixteenth in the senior race. The Eritrean team took bronze medals in the team competition. He finished fifth at the 2009 World Half Marathon Championships, and competed in the 5000 metres at the 2009 World Championships. A fifth place at the 2010 IAAF World Half Marathon Championships gained him a team silver medal alongside Zersenay Tadese. He took third at the Cross Valle de Llodio in November behind compatriot Teklemariam Medhin.

He ran at the 2011 IAAF World Cross Country Championships but was ultimately disqualified as he and Ethiopia's Abera Kuma began fighting on the final stretch. Reflecting the history of antipathy between the nations, Tsegay accused the Ethiopian of deliberately elbowing him and standing on his heels from behind, thus he reacted by grabbing Abera's leg and threw a punch before dashing to the finish. The IAAF disqualified both athletes for their conduct. He ran a personal best of 2:07:28 hours at the Amsterdam Marathon in October that year. Although this time brought him the national record for the marathon, previously held by Yonas Kifle, he only finished eighth in the high calibre race. At the 2012 Egmond Half Marathon he took third place.

His personal best times are 13:16.59 minutes in the 5000 metres, achieved in July 2009 in Barcelona; 28:20.96 minutes in the 10,000 metres, achieved in June 2009 in Villeneuve-d'Ascq; and 59:21 hours in the half marathon, achieved in March 2014 in Copenhagen.
