= James Theuri =

French long-distance runner (born 1978)

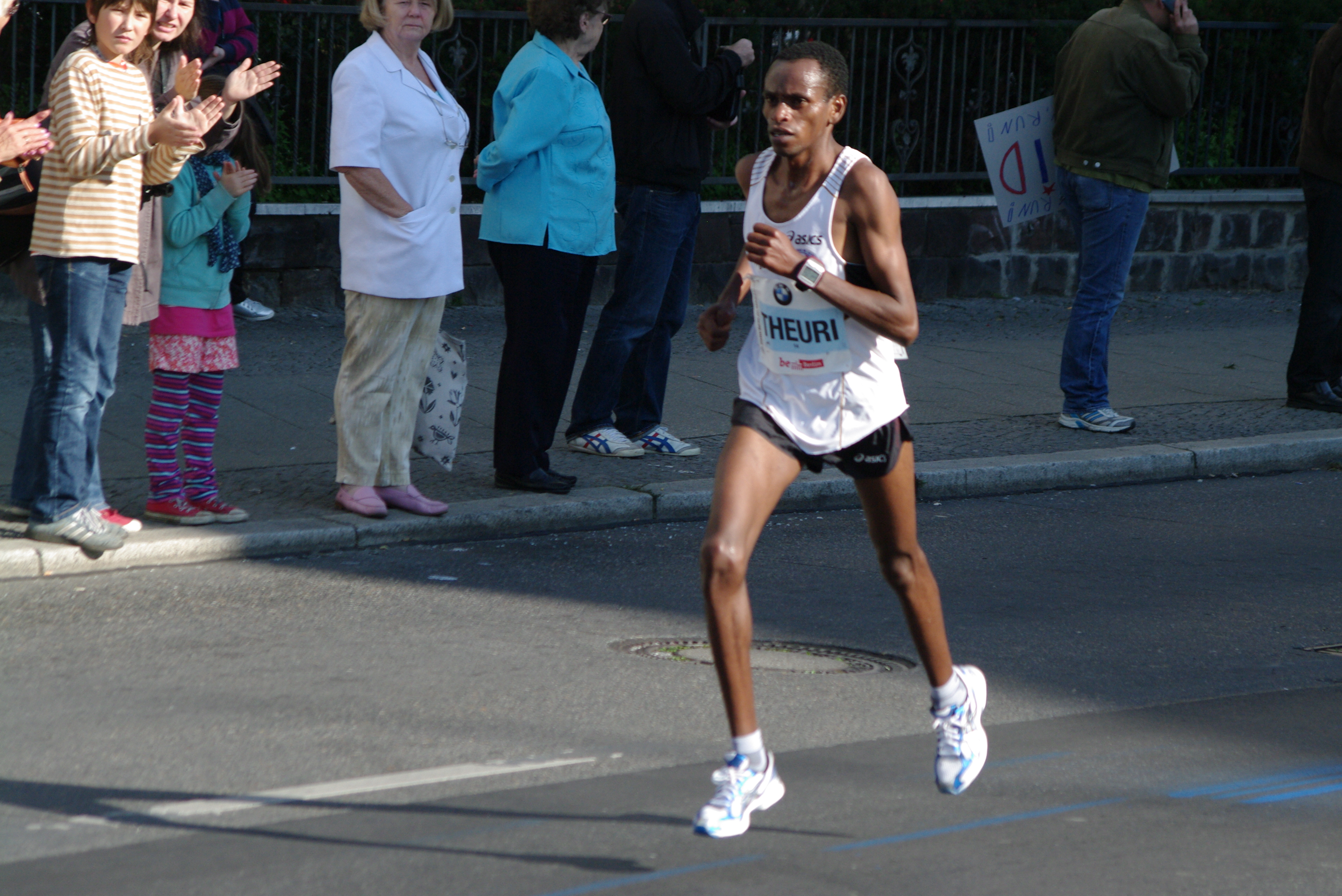
James Theuri at the Berlin Marathon, 2011

James Theuri (born 30 October 1978 in Kanjinji, Kenya) is a French athlete who specialises in the marathon. Theuri competed at the 2009 World Championships in Athletics.
