= Moses Aliwa =

Ugandan long-distance runner

Moses Aliwa (born 2 April 1986 in Kapchorwa District) is a Ugandan long-distance runner.

He finished sixth in 10,000 metres at the 2004 World Junior Championships. At the 2007 World Cross Country Championships he finished nineteenth in the senior race, while the Ugandan team of which he was a part won the bronze medal in the team competition.

== Personal bests ==
- 5000 metres - 14:26.72 min (2004)
- 10,000 metres - 28:53.75 min (2004)
