= Amanuel Mesel =

Eritrean long-distance runner

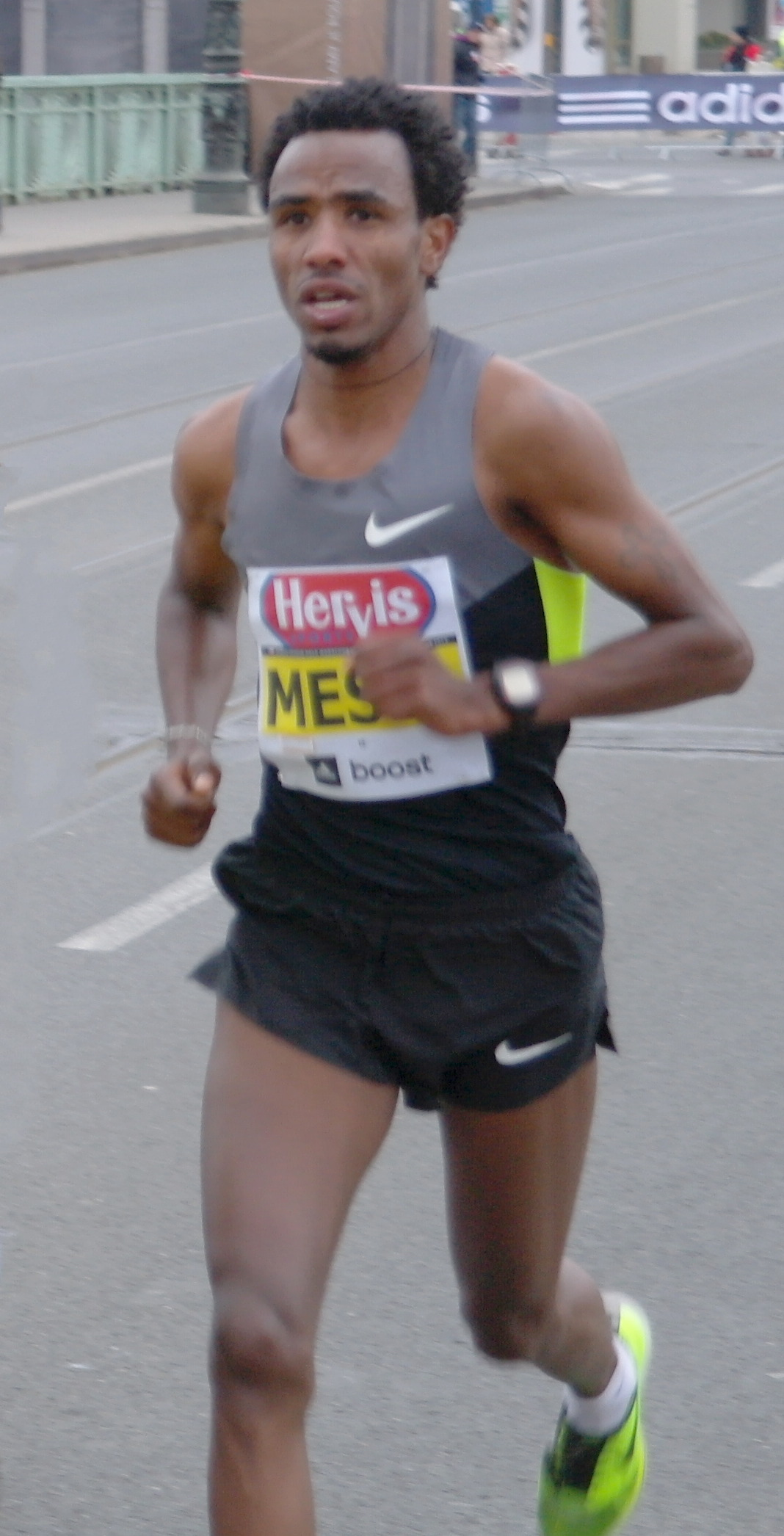
- Mesel at the 2013 Prague Half Marathon

Personal information
- Born: 29 December 1990 (age 35) Asmara, Ethiopia
- Height: 177 cm (5 ft 10 in)
- Weight: 59 kg (130 lb)

Sport
- Sport: Athletics
- Event: 3000 m – marathon
- Coached by: Iseyas Asefaw

Achievements and titles
- Personal bests: 3000 m – 8:13.4 (2006); 5000 m – 13:16.25 (2011); 10,000 m – 28:29.24 (2006); HM – 1:00:10 (2013); Marathon – 2:08:17 (2013)

Amanuel Mesel Tikue (born 29 December 1990) is an Eritrean long-distance runner. (Note: "Amanuel Mesel". The London Organising Committee of the Olympic Games and Paralympic Games Limited. Archived from the original on 24 May 2013.) At the 2012 Summer Olympics, he competed in the 5000 metres, finishing 33rd in round 1, failing to qualify for the final. He placed 21st in the marathon at the 2016 Summer Olympics.
