= Damian Paul Chopa =

Tanzanian long-distance runner

Damian Paul Chopa (born 28 November 1986) is a Tanzanian long-distance runner who specializes in the 5000 metres and cross-country running.

== Achievements ==
| Year | Tournament | Venue | Result | Extra |
|---|---|---|---|---|
| 2004 | World Cross Country Championships | Brussels, Belgium | 27th | Short race |
| 2005 | World Cross Country Championships | Saint-Étienne, France | 27th | Short race |
| 2006 | Commonwealth Games | Melbourne, Australia | 6th | 5000 m, 13:24.03 PB |
| 2006 | African Championships | Bambous, Mauritius | 9th | 5000 m |
| 2007 | World Cross Country Championships | Mombasa, Kenya | 12th | Senior race |

=== Personal bests ===
- 800 metres – 1:50.19 min (2004)
- 1500 metres – 3:43.4 min (2003)
- 5000 metres – 13:24.03 min (2006)
