= Vincent Chepkok =

Kenyan long-distance runner (born 1988)

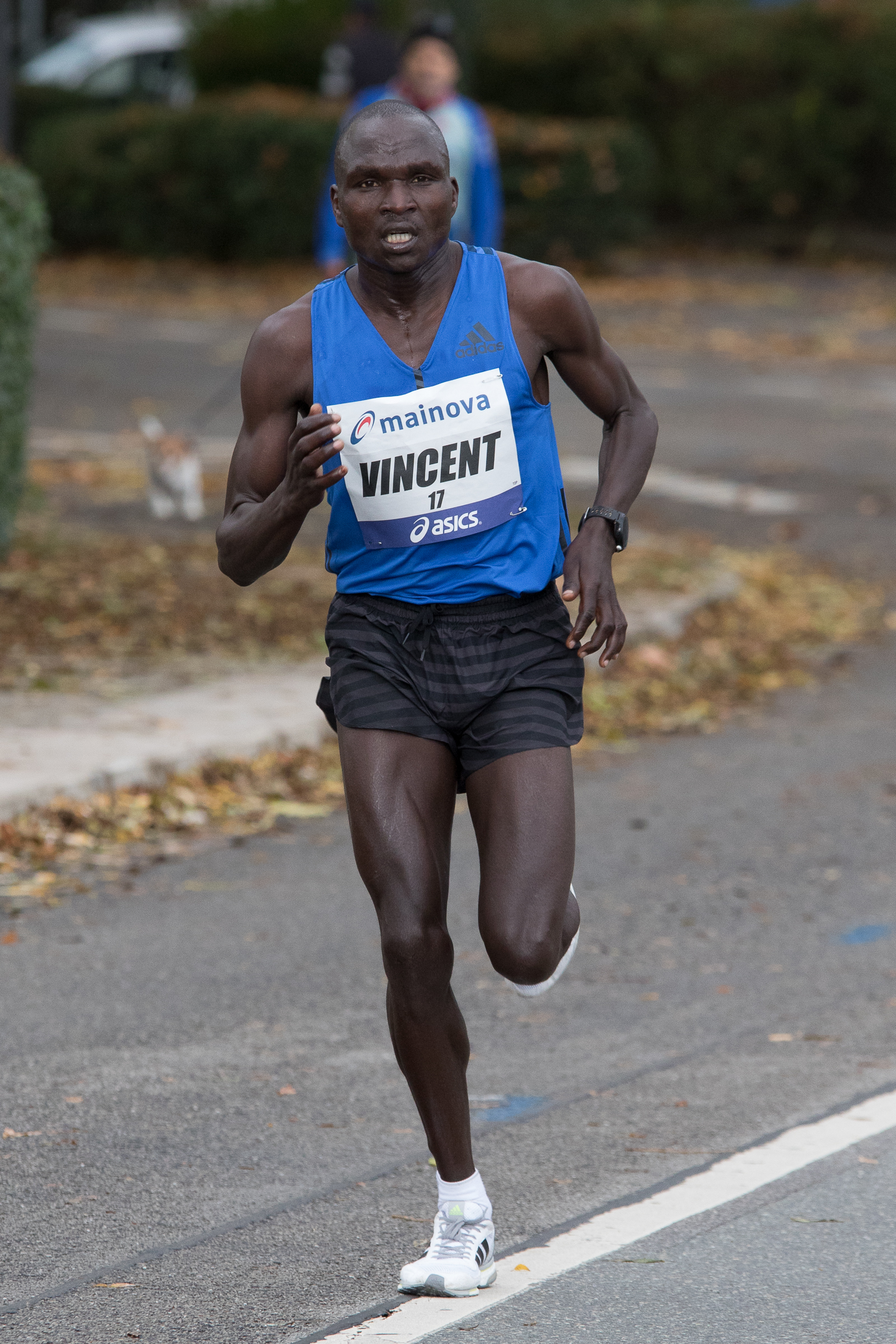
- Chepkok at the 2017 Frankfurt Marathon

Personal information
- Born: 5 July 1988 (age 38) Kapkitony, Keiyo District, Kenya

Sport
- Sport: Athletics
- Events: 3000 metres, 5000 metres, 10000 metres

Vincent Kiprop Chepkok (born 5 July 1988) is a Kenyan professional long-distance runner who specializes in the 5000 metres.

Chepkok was born in Kapkitony in the Keiyo District of Kenya's Rift Valley Province. He won the silver medal in the junior race at the 2007 World Cross Country Championships, finished ninth at the 2009 World Championships and seventh at the 2009 World Athletics Final. He gained a major 5000 m win on the 2010 IAAF Diamond League circuit, winning at the British Grand Prix.

He came second at the Cross Internacional Zornotza behind Joseph Ebuya at the start of 2011. He gained a place on the senior Kenyan World team after coming third at the Kenyan National Cross Country Championships. He repeated that position at the 2011 IAAF World Cross Country Championships, securing the bronze medal behind Imane Merga and Paul Tanui, as well as sharing in the team gold with the Kenyan men. On the 2011 IAAF Diamond League circuit he was third at the Golden Gala, won at Athletissima, then came third at the Memorial van Damme final to place second overall in the 5000 m rankings.

At the start of the cross country season in November 2011, he came fourth at the Cross de Atapuerca but won the Cross de Soria a week later. He finished second to Edwin Soi at the Campaccio race, then finished behind Ebuya at the Cross Zornotza for a second year running. Chepkok was fifth at the 2012 African Cross Country Championships in March, taking the team title with Kenya. He was runner-up behind Sammy Kitwara at the World's Best 10K that month. He was fourth in the 5000 m at the Kenyan trials, missing a spot at the 2012 London Olympics, but ran a 10,000 metres best of 26:51.68 minutes at the Memorial Van Damme meet. He won the Cross Internacional de Venta de Baños in December.

== Personal bests ==
Outdoor

- 3000 metres – 7:30.15 (Doha 2011)
- 5000 metres – 12:51.45 (Doha 2010)
- 10,000 metres – 26:51.68 (Boudewijnstadion 2012)
- Half marathon – 1:00:53 (Porto 2014)
- Marathon – 2:11:55 (Paris 2015)
