= Mourad Marofit =

Moroccan long-distance runner

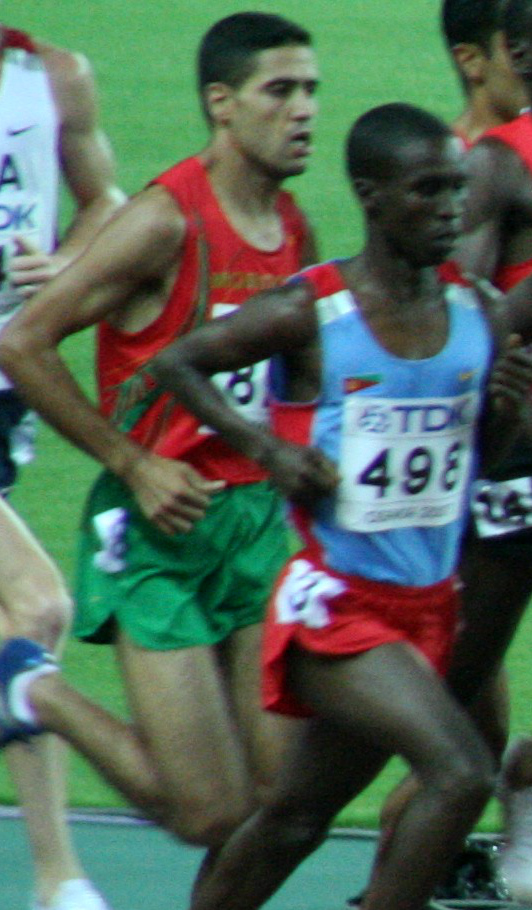
- Mourad Marofit (red vest) in 2007

Personal information
- Nationality: Morocco
- Born: 26 January 1982 (age 44) Khemisset, Morocco
- Height: 1.78 m (5 ft 10 in)
- Weight: 62 kg (137 lb)

Sport
- Sport: Athletics
- Event: Long-distance running

Achievements and titles
- Personal best: 5000 m: 13:02.84 (2008)

Mourad Marofit (Arabic: مراد ماروفيت; born January 26, 1982, in Khemisset) is a Moroccan long-distance runner. He set his personal best time of 13:02.84, by winning the men's 5000 metres at the KBC Night of Athletics in Heusden-Zolder, Belgium.

Marofit represented Morocco at the 2008 Summer Olympics in Beijing, where he competed for the men's 5,000 metres. He ran in the second heat against thirteen other athletes, including Kenya's Edwin Cheruiyot Soi, who later won the bronze medal in the final. He finished the race in eighth place by five seconds behind New Zealand's Adrian Blincoe, with a time of 14:00.76. Marofit, however, failed to advance into the final, as he placed thirtieth overall, and was ranked farther below four mandatory slots for the next round.
