= 2007 World Championships in Athletics – Men's 5000 metres =

The men's 5000 metres at the 2007 World Championships in Athletics was held at the Nagai Stadium on 30 August and 2 September.

== Medalists ==
Gold	Silver	Bronze
Bernard Lagat; United States	Eliud Kipchoge; Kenya	Moses Kipsiro; Uganda

== Records ==
Prior to the competition, the following records were as follows.

World record	Kenenisa Bekele (ETH)	12:37.35	Hengelo, Netherlands	31 May 2004
Championship record	Eliud Kipchoge (KEN)	12:52.79	Paris, France	31 August 2003
World leading	Kenenisa Bekele (ETH)	12:49.53	Zaragoza, Spain	28 July 2007

== Schedule ==
Date	Time	Round
August 30, 2007	20:45	Heats
September 2, 2007	19:30	Final

== Results ==
KEY:	q	Qualified on time	Q	Qualified	WR	World record	AR	Area record	NR	National record	PB	Personal best	SB	Seasonal best

=== Heats ===
Qualification: First 5 in each heat (Q) and the next 5 fastest (q) advance to the final.

Rank	Heat	Name	Nationality	Time	Notes
1	2	Eliud Kipchoge	Kenya	13:33.37	Q
2	2	Abreham Cherkos	Ethiopia	13:33.62	Q
3	2	Matt Tegenkamp	United States	13:35.05	Q
4	2	Craig Mottram	Australia	13:36.18	Q
5	2	Juan Luis Barrios	Mexico	13:37.12	Q
6	2	Mo Farah	Great Britain	13:39.13	q, SB
7	2	Benjamin Limo	Kenya	13:41.47	q
8	2	Adam Goucher	United States	13:41.65	q
9	2	Ali Abdalla	Eritrea	13:42.00	q
10	2	Felix Kikwai Kibore	Qatar	13:46.23	q
11	1	Tariku Bekele	Ethiopia	13:46.42	Q
12	1	Jesús España	Spain	13:46.45	Q
13	1	Bernard Lagat	United States	13:46.57	Q
14	1	Hicham Bellani	Morocco	13:46.64	Q
15	1	Moses Ndiema Kipsiro	Uganda	13:46.86	Q
16	2	Dieudonné Disi	Rwanda	13:47.30	SB
17	1	Khoudir Aggoune	Algeria	13:47.36	
18	1	Isaac Kiprono Songok	Kenya	13:47.42	
19	1	Ahmed Baday	Morocco	13:47.83	
20	1	Joseph Ebuya	Kenya	13:48.21	
21	2	Jan Fitschen	Germany	13:48.39	
22	2	Aadam Ismaeel Khamis	Bahrain	13:50.30	
23	1	Tonny Wamulwa	Zambia	13:50.95	SB
24	1	Bekana Daba	Ethiopia	13:53.16	
25	1	Charles Bett Koech	Qatar	13:53.36	
26	2	Mourad Marofit	Morocco	13:54.65	
27	2	Takayuki Matsumiya	Japan	13:54.95	
28	1	Alistair Cragg	Ireland	13:59.45	
29	2	Stephen Kiprotich	Uganda	14:04.22	
30	1	Erik Sjöqvist	Sweden	14:05.69	
31	1	Yu Mitsuya	Japan	14:07.38	
32	2	Cleveland Forde	Guyana	15:25.12	
33	2	Thura Aung	Myanmar	15:41.08	
	1	Kabirou Dan Mallam	Niger		DNF
	1	Nader al-Masri	Palestine		DNS
	1	David Galván	Mexico		DNS

=== Final ===
Rank	Name	Nationality	Time	Notes
1st place, gold medalist(s)	Bernard Lagat	United States	13:45.87	
2nd place, silver medalist(s)	Eliud Kipchoge	Kenya	13:46.00	
3rd place, bronze medalist(s)	Moses Ndiema Kipsiro	Uganda	13:46.75	
4	Matt Tegenkamp	United States	13:46.78	
5	Tariku Bekele	Ethiopia	13:47.33	
6	Mo Farah	Great Britain	13:47.54	
7	Jesús España	Spain	13:50.55	
8	Abreham Cherkos	Ethiopia	13:51.01	
9	Felix Kikwai Kibore	Qatar	13:51.18	
10	Ali Abdalla	Eritrea	13:52.69	
11	Adam Goucher	United States	13:53.17	
12	Hicham Bellani	Morocco	13:55.44	
13	Craig Mottram	Australia	13:56.24	
14	Juan Luis Barrios	Mexico	13:59.86	
15	Benjamin Limo	Kenya	14:01.25	
