= Athletics at the 2011 All-Africa Games – Men's half marathon =

The men's half marathon event at the 2011 All-Africa Games was held on 15 September.

== Results ==
Rank	Name	Nationality	Time	Notes
1st place, gold medalist(s)	Lelisa Desisa	Ethiopia	1:04:31	
2nd place, silver medalist(s)	Kennet Kipkemoi	Kenya	1:04:44	
3rd place, bronze medalist(s)	Bekana Daba	Ethiopia	1:04:51	
4	Leonard Kipkoech	Kenya	1:05:02	
5	Kelvin Pangiso	Zimbabwe	1:05:11	
6	Dickson Marwa	Tanzania	1:05:22	
7	Tewolde Estiranos	Eritrea	1:05:25	
8	Ramolefi Motsieola	Lesotho	1:05:28	
9	Ali Abdosh	Ethiopia	1:06:14	
10	Lewis Masunda	Zimbabwe	1:07:22	
11	Nelson Cruz	Cape Verde	1:07:24	
12	Ilunga Mande	Democratic Republic of the Congo	1:08:51	
13	Reinhold Iitaa	Namibia	1:09:17	
14	Alain Nkulu Ngoy	Democratic Republic of the Congo	1:09:23	
15	Avelino Dumbo	Angola	1:09:38	
16	Tsepo Ramonene	Lesotho	1:10:27	
17	Spencer Adilson	Cape Verde	1:12:30	
18	Issufo Mancubo	Mozambique	1:13:18	
19	Manuel Macoza	Mozambique	1:13:51	
	Fabiano Joseph Naasi	Tanzania	DNF	
