= 2010 African Championships in Athletics – Men's 5000 metres =

The men's 5000 metres at the 2010 African Championships in Athletics were held on August 1.

== Results ==
Rank	Name	Nationality	Time	Notes
1st place, gold medalist(s)	Edwin Soy	Kenya	13:30.46	SB
2nd place, silver medalist(s)	Vincent Yator	Kenya	13:30.53	SB
3rd place, bronze medalist(s)	Mark Kiptoo	Kenya	13:32.45	SB
4	Moses Ndiema Kipsiro	Uganda	13:39.80	
5	Imane Merga	Ethiopia	13:41.98	
6	Tariku Bekele	Ethiopia	13:42.41	
7	Bekana Daba	Ethiopia	13:45.19	
8	Amanuel Mesel	Eritrea	13:54.31	
9	Abraham Kiplimo	Uganda	13:56.86	
10	Issak Sibhatu	Eritrea	14:01.32	
11	Ezechiel Nizigiyimana	Burundi	14:01.78	
12	Geoffrey Kusuro	Uganda	14:03.82	
13	Oliver Irabaruta	Burundi	14:09.25	
14	Damian Chopa	Tanzania	14:13.38	
15	Bernard Bizimana	Burundi	14:13.74	SB
16	Tony Wamulwa	Zambia	14:16.62	
17	Tshamano Setone	South Africa	14:21.36	
18	Jean M. Viany Kwajeneza	Rwanda	14:22.01	
19	Youssouf His Bachir	Djibouti	14:58.19	SB
20	Chancy Master	Malawi	15:09.82	
21	Goumaneh Omar Doualeh	Djibouti	15:27.67	
22	Yav Majita	Democratic Republic of the Congo	15:28.38	
23	Abdinaser Said Ibrahim	Somalia	15:30.94	
24	Abdishakor Nagea Abdulle	Somalia	15:58.46	
	Simon Labiche	Seychelles	DNF	
	Anis Selmouni	Morocco	DNF	
	Marko Joseph	Tanzania	DNS	
	Eric Sebahire	Rwanda	DNS	
	Kidane Tadasse	Eritrea	DNS	
