= Athletics at the 2007 All-Africa Games – Men's 5000 metres =

The men's 5000 metres at the 2007 All-Africa Games were held on July 22.

== Results ==
Rank	Name	Nationality	Time	Notes
1st place, gold medalist(s)	Moses Kipsiro	Uganda	13:12.51	GR
2nd place, silver medalist(s)	Josphat Kiprono Menjo	Kenya	13:12.64	
3rd place, bronze medalist(s)	Tariku Bekele	Ethiopia	13:13.43	
4	Abraham Cherkose	Ethiopia	13:14.90	
5	Ali Abdosh	Ethiopia	13:16.21	
6	Thomas Longosiwa	Kenya	13:17.48	
7	Ali Abdalla Afrenji	Eritrea	13:23.65	
8	Khoudir Aggoune	Algeria	13:25.91	
9	Mark Kiptoo	Kenya	13:32.07	
10	Amanuel Hagos	Eritrea	13:35.38	
11	Amanuel Meles Tuku	Eritrea	13:39.13	
12	Boy Soke	South Africa	13:39.83	
13	Dickson Marwa	Tanzania	13:41.29	
14	Damian Chopa	Tanzania	13:52.39	
15	Abraham Nyonkuru	Burundi	13:58.76	
16	Willy Nduwimana	Burundi	14:07.18	
17	Tshamano Setone	South Africa	14:08.72	
18	Mbongeni Ngazozo	South Africa	14:25.75	
19	Adel Mahjdhoub	Libya	14:40.54	
20	Benipepe Degoto Gloum	Central African Republic	15:12.90	
	Ali Saïdi-Sief	Algeria	DNF	
	Albert Sechaba Bohosi	Lesotho	DNS	
	Joaquin Chaman	Angola	DNS	
	Ouman Sylla Sekan	Guinea	DNS	
	Oume Taher	Chad	DNS	
