= Paris Ekiden =

International relay race in Paris

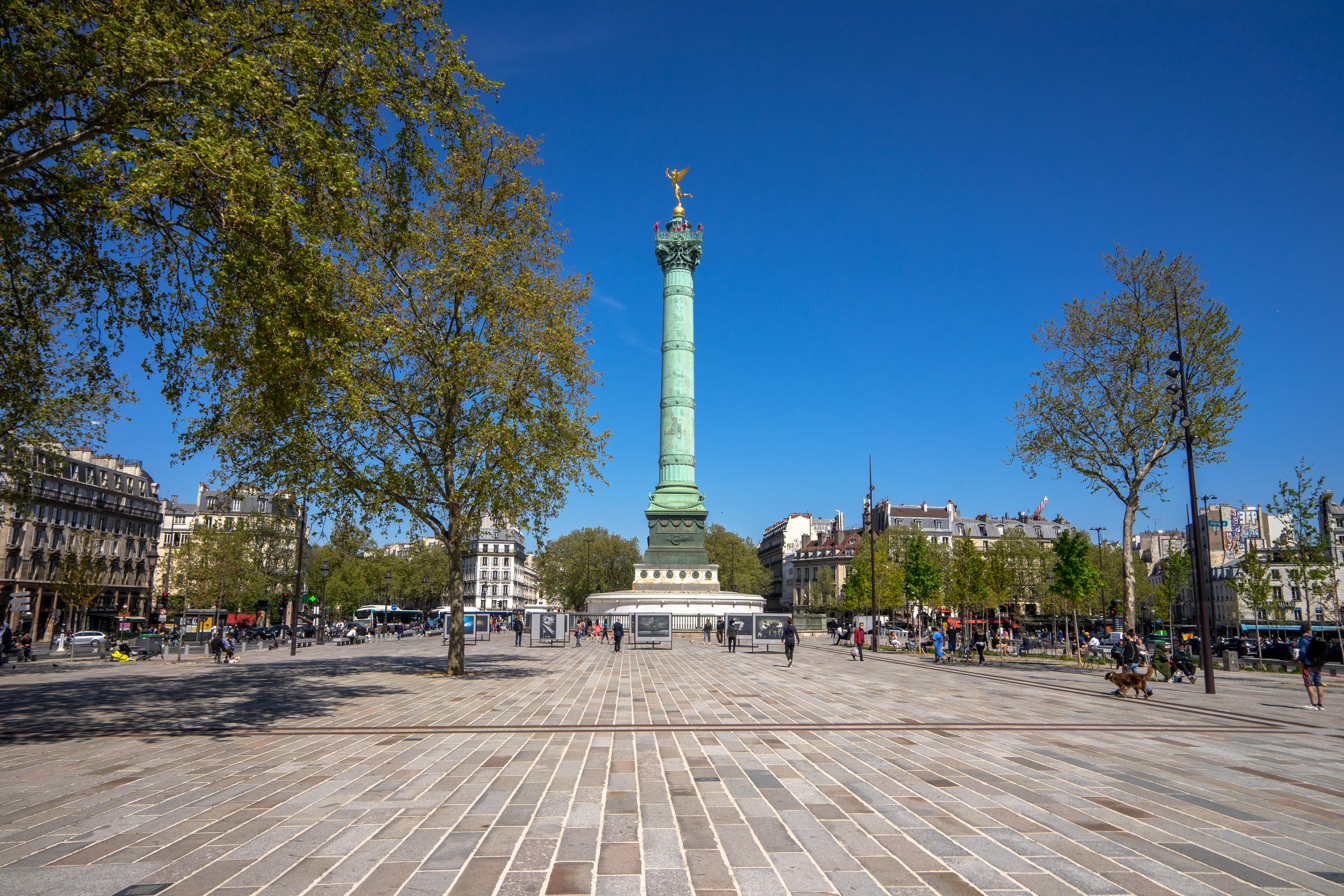
Place de la Bastille, where the new race finished

The Paris Ekiden, formerly known as the Versailles to Paris Ekiden, is an international ekiden (marathon relay race) held in Paris. The inaugural race in 1990 was marred by a series of problems, which led to the race's discontinuation until 2013 when it returned on an annual basis.

== History ==
The inaugural edition of the race in 1990 featured 20 teams of 6 runners, with each team consisting of 4 men and 2 women. It had a budget of 6 million Euros.

During the final stage of the race, all teams except for the two leaders Great Britain and Denmark ran off course. As a result, all but those teams ran approximately 1 kilometre (0.62 mi) short of the official race distance. It was viewed as a failure of event security, and the competition was not held again the following year.

The race would not return again until 2013 on a yearly basis, with the elite athletes running alongside a mass ekiden race. The new race started near The Louvre and finished at the Place de la Bastille.

== Winners ==
Paris Ekiden winning teams (6-leg races)
Ed.	Date	Athletes	Split	Team	Time	Ref
1st	28 October 1990	Albertina Dias	10:47	Portugal	1:59:04 (~40 km)	
1st	28 October 1990	Luis-Felipe de Jesus	12:06	Portugal	1:59:04 (~40 km)	
1st	28 October 1990	Ezequiel Canario	20:10	Portugal	1:59:04 (~40 km)	
1st	28 October 1990	Elisio Rios	33:06	Portugal	1:59:04 (~40 km)	
1st	28 October 1990	Monica Gama	19:51	Portugal	1:59:04 (~40 km)	
1st	28 October 1990	Juan-Carlos Montero Castellanos (ESP)	23:04	Portugal	1:59:04 (~40 km)	
2nd	3 November 2013	Yuki Namba	15:12	Japan	2:15:14 (marathon)	
2nd	3 November 2013	Yuji Sasanuma	32:09	Japan	2:15:14 (marathon)	
2nd	3 November 2013	Yuki Nakamura	18:06	Japan	2:15:14 (marathon)	
2nd	3 November 2013	Yuka Ando	35:08	Japan	2:15:14 (marathon)	
2nd	3 November 2013	Kenta Chiba	15:43	Japan	2:15:14 (marathon)	
2nd	3 November 2013	Kumiko Kamei	18:59	Japan	2:15:14 (marathon)	
3rd	2 November 2014	Josephat Muraga	15:18	France	2:07:47 (marathon)	
3rd	2 November 2014	Willy Nduwimana	30:09	France	2:07:47 (marathon)	
3rd	2 November 2014	Said El Medouly	15:13	France	2:07:47 (marathon)	
3rd	2 November 2014	Ezechiel Nizigiyimana	30:25	France	2:07:47 (marathon)	
3rd	2 November 2014	Ruben Iindongo	15:04	France	2:07:47 (marathon)	
3rd	2 November 2014	Jean Claude Niyonizigiye	21:31	France	2:07:47 (marathon)	
4th	1 November 2015	Dieudonne Disi (RWA)	15:49	Unirun	2:11:03 (marathon)	
4th	1 November 2015	Gervais Hakizimana (RWA)	30:45	Unirun	2:11:03 (marathon)	
4th	1 November 2015	Thomas Larchaud (FRA)	16:19	Unirun	2:11:03 (marathon)	
4th	1 November 2015	Jean-damascene Habarurema (RWA)	30:50	Unirun	2:11:03 (marathon)	
4th	1 November 2015	Mondhir Fekir (FRA)	15:42	Unirun	2:11:03 (marathon)	
4th	1 November 2015	Romain Hesschentier (FRA)	21:42	Unirun	2:11:03 (marathon)	
5th	6 November 2016	Thomas Larchaud (FRA)	15:50	Unirun	2:13:41 (marathon)	
5th	6 November 2016	Jean-damascene Habarurema (RWA)	31:26	Unirun	2:13:41 (marathon)	
5th	6 November 2016	Benoit Looten (FRA)	16:05	Unirun	2:13:41 (marathon)	
5th	6 November 2016	Abraham Niyonkuru (BDI)	31:42	Unirun	2:13:41 (marathon)	
5th	6 November 2016	Mondhir Fekir (FRA)	16:37	Unirun	2:13:41 (marathon)	
5th	6 November 2016	Gervais Hakizimana (RWA)	22:03	Unirun	2:13:41 (marathon)	
6th	5 November 2017	Thomas Larchaud (FRA)	14:31	Unirun 1	2:14:33 (marathon)	
6th	5 November 2017	Jean-damascene Habarurema (RWA)	31:50	Unirun 1	2:14:33 (marathon)	
6th	5 November 2017	Julien Duchateau (FRA)	15:49	Unirun 1	2:14:33 (marathon)	
6th	5 November 2017	Mondhir Fekir (FRA)	32:17	Unirun 1	2:14:33 (marathon)	
6th	5 November 2017	Gervais Hakizimana (RWA)	15:35	Unirun 1	2:14:33 (marathon)	
6th	5 November 2017	Abraham Niyonkuru (BDI)	24:31	Unirun 1	2:14:33 (marathon)	
7th	4 November 2018	Romain Courcières (FRA)		Alès Cévennes Athlétisme	2:08:23 (marathon)	
7th	4 November 2018	Christopher Berraho (FRA)		Alès Cévennes Athlétisme	2:08:23 (marathon)	
7th	4 November 2018	Julien Samson (FRA)		Alès Cévennes Athlétisme	2:08:23 (marathon)	
7th	4 November 2018	El Hassane Ben Lkhainouch (FRA)		Alès Cévennes Athlétisme	2:08:23 (marathon)	
7th	4 November 2018	Julien Mendez (FRA)		Alès Cévennes Athlétisme	2:08:23 (marathon)	
7th	4 November 2018	Damien Gras (FRA)		Alès Cévennes Athlétisme	2:08:23 (marathon)	
8th	3 November 2019	Thomas Wadoux (FRA)	15:33	Unirun 59	2:10:22 (marathon)	
8th	3 November 2019	Felicien Muhitira (RWA)	29:52	Unirun 59	2:10:22 (marathon)	
8th	3 November 2019	Gervais Hakizimana (RWA)	15:25	Unirun 59	2:10:22 (marathon)	
8th	3 November 2019	Isaac Maiyo Kibiwott (KEN)	31:20	Unirun 59	2:10:22 (marathon)	
8th	3 November 2019	Abraham Niyonkuru (BDI)	15:17	Unirun 59	2:10:22 (marathon)	
8th	3 November 2019	Jeremy Carrier (FRA)	22:58	Unirun 59	2:10:22 (marathon)	
9th	7 November 2021	Jules Robin	14:39	PMAV	2:13:21 (marathon)	
9th	7 November 2021	Hatem Fares	31:11	PMAV	2:13:21 (marathon)	
9th	7 November 2021	Ken Chareil	16:27	PMAV	2:13:21 (marathon)	
9th	7 November 2021	Sajid Mouhcine	32:19	PMAV	2:13:21 (marathon)	
9th	7 November 2021	Yacine Tajja	15:58	PMAV	2:13:21 (marathon)	
9th	7 November 2021	Youssef Mekdafou	22:51	PMAV	2:13:21 (marathon)	
10th	6 November 2022	Yann Schrub (FRA)	14:27	Team Adidas	2:04:40 (marathon)	
10th	6 November 2022	Benjamin Choquert (FRA)	29:55	Team Adidas	2:04:40 (marathon)	
10th	6 November 2022	Pierre Kardous (FRA)	16:07	Team Adidas	2:04:40 (marathon)	
10th	6 November 2022	Hassan Chahdi (FRA)	28:54	Team Adidas	2:04:40 (marathon)	
10th	6 November 2022	Paul Anselmini (FRA)	14:39	Team Adidas	2:04:40 (marathon)	
10th	6 November 2022	Valentin Gondouin (FRA)	20:41	Team Adidas	2:04:40 (marathon)	
11th	5 November 2023	Pierre Carlier (FRA)	15:12	Racing Multi Athlon	2:14:53 (42 km)	
11th	5 November 2023	Kevin El Fallahi (FRA)	33:54	Racing Multi Athlon	2:14:53 (42 km)	
11th	5 November 2023	Paul-Mathieu Lannuzel (FRA)	15:27	Racing Multi Athlon	2:14:53 (42 km)	
11th	5 November 2023	Krilan Le Bihan (FRA)	32:37	Racing Multi Athlon	2:14:53 (42 km)	
11th	5 November 2023	Pierre McGarvey (FRA)	16:25	Racing Multi Athlon	2:14:53 (42 km)	
11th	5 November 2023	Teo Rubens Banini (FRA)	21:22	Racing Multi Athlon	2:14:53 (42 km)	

== Stage bests ==
Best stage times per year (6-stage race)
Year	Stage 1			Stage 2			Stage 3			Stage 4			Stage 5			Stage 6		
Year	Distance	Best time	Athlete	Distance	Best time	Athlete	Distance	Best time	Athlete	Distance	Best time	Athlete	Distance	Best time	Athlete	Distance	Best time	Athlete
1990	3.2 km	10:47	Albertina Dias (POR)	4.5 km	11:59	Brahim El-Ghazali (FRA)	7.1 km	18:56	Mohamed Issengar (MAR)	10.9 km	32:24	Richard Nerurkar (ENG)	6.9 km	19:22	Malin Ewerlöf Krepp (SWE)	7.7 km	22:47	Said Aouita (MAR)
2013	5.25 km	15:12	Yuki Namba (JPN)	10.5 km	32:09	Yuji Sasanuma (JPN)	5.25 km	18:06	Yuki Nakamura (JPN)	10.5 km	35:08	Yuka Ando (JPN)	5.25 km	15:43	Kenta Chiba (JPN)	5.445 km	18:22	Vincent Bernard (FRA)
2014	5 km	15:18	Josephat Muraga (FRA)	10 km	29:48	Andrea Lalli (ITA)	5 km	14:40	Timothee Bommier (FRA)	10 km	30:15	Ahmed El Mazoury (ITA)	5 km	14:34	Pierre Urruty (FRA)	7.195 km	21:31	Jean Claude Niyonizigiye (FRA)
2015	5 km	15:49	Dieudonné Disi (RWA)	10 km	30:27	Ryotaro Nitta (JPN)	5 km	16:19	Thomas Larchaud (FRA)	10 km	30:27	Ryo Ishita (JPN)	5 km	15:42	Mondhir Fekir (FRA)	7.195 km	20:53	Hiroyoshi Umegae (JPN)
2016	5 km	15:13	Tarik Moukrime (FRA)	10 km	31:26	Jean-damascene Habarurema (RWA)	5 km	15:57	Remi Deprez (FRA)	10 km	31:41	David Kamwende Chege (KEN)	5 km	16:01	Theo Daeschler (FRA)	7.195 km	21:39	Vincent Luis (FRA)
2017	5 km	14:25	Alexandre Descot (FRA)	10 km	31:50	Jean-damascene Habarurema (RWA)	5 km	15:49	Julien Duchateau (FRA)	10 km	32:15	Romain Vogt (FRA)	5 km	15:28	Nicolas Dalmasso (FRA)	7.195 km	23:54	Adrien Guiomar (FRA)
2018	5.1 km	14:45		10 km	29:44		5 km	15:12		10 km	29:58		5 km	14:59		7.095 km	20:51	
2019	5.1 km	14:56	Youssef Mekdafou (FRA)	10 km	29:52	Felicien Muhitira (RWA)	5 km	15:25	Gervais Hakizimana (RWA)	10 km	31:20	Isaac Maiyo Kibiwott (KEN)	5 km	15:17	Abraham Niyonkuru (BDI)	7.095 km	22:43	Baptiste Cartieaux (FRA)
2021	5.1 km	14:02	Yoann Kowal (FRA)	10 km	29:34	Felicien Muhitira (RWA)	5 km	16:05	Kevin Cecchinel	10 km	30:37	Bertrand Gaget	5 km	15:43	Yoan Duboin	7.095 km	22:32	Kevin Daniel
2022	5 km	14:02	Yann Schrub (FRA)	10 km	29:29	Mehdi Frere (FRA)	5 km	15:04	Arthur Descazeaud (FRA)	10 km	28:54	Hassan Chahdi (FRA)	5 km	14:39	Paul Anselmini (FRA)	7.195 km	20:41	Valentin Gondouin (FRA)
2023	5 km	15:12	Pierre Carlier (FRA)	10 km	31:18	Antoine Provost (FRA)	5 km	15:27	Paul-Mathieu Lannuzel (FRA)	10 km	31:34	Sacha Liguori (FRA)	5 km	15:43	Edmond Baudot (FRA)	7 km	21:22	Teo Rubens Banini (FRA)
