= Tariku Bekele =

Ethiopian long-distance runner (born 1987)

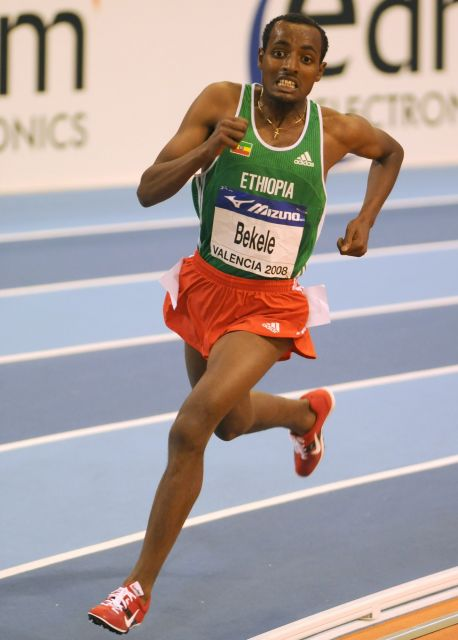
- Tariku Bekele at the 2008 World Indoor Championships

Personal information
- Born: 28 February 1987 (age 39) Bekoji (woreda), Ethiopia

Sport
- Country: Ethiopia
- Sport: Track, Long-distance running
- Events: 3000 metres, 5000 metres, 10,000 metres

Achievements and titles
- Personal bests: 3000 metres: 7:28.70; 2-mile: 8:04.83; 5000 metres: 12:52.45; 10,000 metres: 27:03.24
Medal record
Representing Ethiopia
Men's athletics
Olympic Games
Bronze medal – third place	2012 London	10,000 m
World Indoor Championships
Gold medal – first place	2008 Valencia	3000 m
World Junior Championships
Gold medal – first place	2006 Beijing	5000 m
Bronze medal – third place	2004 Grosseto	5000 m
World Youth Championships
Silver medal – second place	2003 Sherbrooke	3000 m
World Cross Country Championships
Bronze medal – third place	2006 Fukuoka	Junior race

Tariku Bekele Beyecha (Amharic: ታሪኩ በቀለ; born 28 February 1987) is an Ethiopian professional long-distance runner, who specializes in the 5,000 metres and has moved up to 10.000 metres as well. He is the younger brother of Kenenisa Bekele, who is also an accomplished long-distance runner and a former world record holder in both the 5,000 metres and 10,000 metres. Tariku is the fourth fastest Ethiopian ever over 5,000 m and 3,000 metres. His indoor 3,000 m best of 7:31.09 ranks him as the ninth fastest of all time in the event. He was the 10,000 m bronze medallist at the 2012 Summer Olympics.

His first major victory came at the 2008 IAAF World Indoor Championships, where he won the 3,000 m gold medal. He was the 2006 World Junior Champion over the distance and also won a cross country junior bronze medal that year. He took a continental silver medal at the 2007 All-Africa Games. Tariku has finished in the top eight of 5,000 m finals at the 2008 Summer Olympics and at the World Championships in Athletics in 2005 and 2007.

== Running career ==
Following the footsteps of his older brother, he first had success at the younger levels of the sport. He won the 3000 m silver medal behind Augustine Choge at the 2003 World Youth Championships in Athletics and stepped up a distance to take the bronze medal over 5000 m at the 2004 World Junior Championships a year later. He beat Paul Tergat in the 2004 Oeiras International Cross Country meeting.

He made his senior global debut at the 2005 World Championships in Athletics and finished in seventh place in the 5000 m, just ahead of his more experienced compatriot Dejene Berhanu. He ran the 3000 m at the 2006 IAAF World Indoor Championships, finishing in sixth place. Building upon his successes on the track, he was third in the junior race at the 2006 IAAF World Cross Country Championships (while his brother Kenenisa won both senior races).

Tariku became the 5000 m junior champion at the 2006 World Junior Championships and was fourth over the distance at the 2006 IAAF World Athletics Final. He took the 3000 m gold at the World Final, however, having also run the third fastest 3000 m time of the season (7:29.11) in a second-place performance behind Isaac Kiprono Songok at the Rieti Meeting.

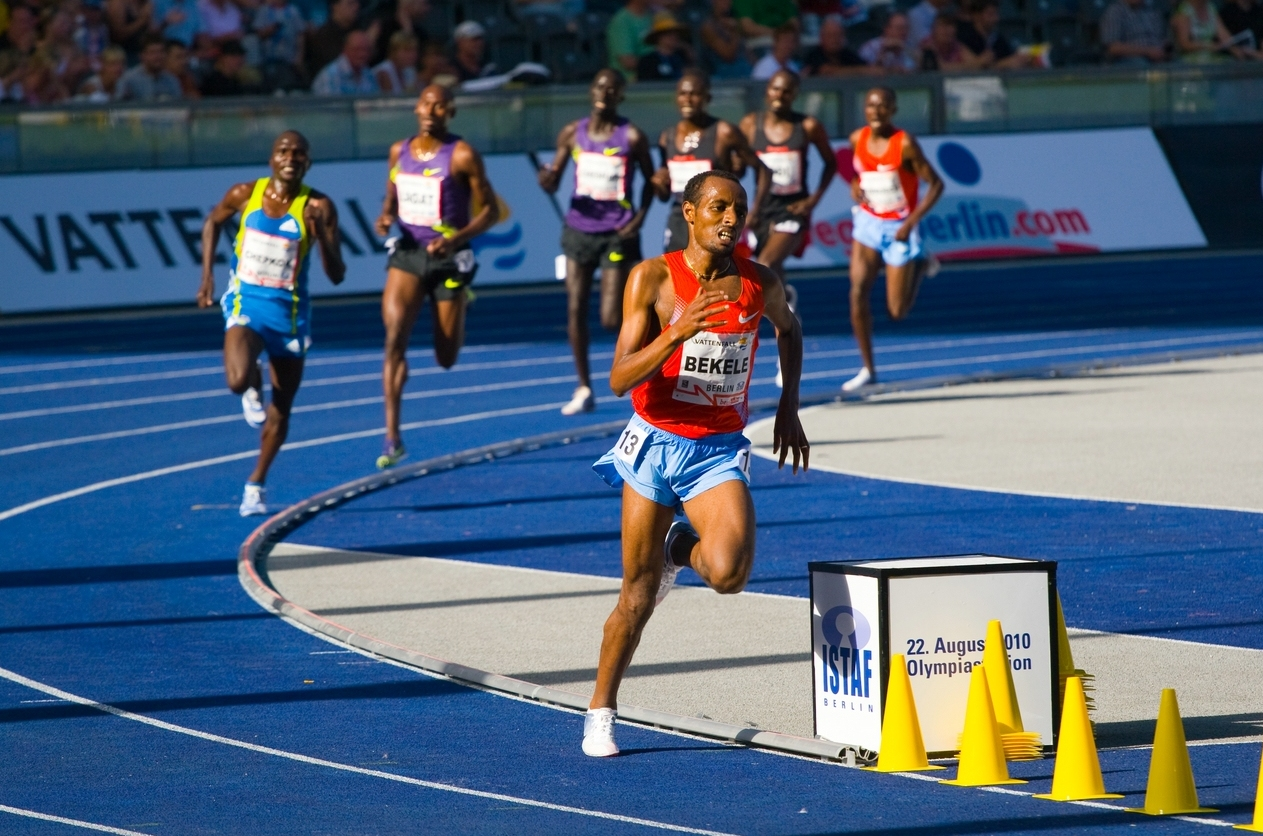
Tariku leading at the 2010 ISTAF meeting

His main focus of the 2007 season was on the 5000 m and he won the silver medal at the 2007 All-Africa Games before going on to take fifth place at the 2007 World Championships over the distance – the best performance by an Ethiopian at the competition. He ascended to the top of his event at the 2008 IAAF World Indoor Championships by winning the indoor 3000 m title at the age of 21 – succeeding his brother as the champion in the event. He made his Olympic debut at the 2008 Beijing Games and was sixth over 5000 m. Among other competitions, he competed at the 2008 IAAF World Athletics Final that year, also finishing in sixth.

He attempted to defend his world title at the 2010 IAAF World Indoor Championships, but it was not to be and he finished in fourth place as Bernard Lagat succeeded him as the 3000 m champion. In the inaugural 2010 IAAF Diamond League series he took two major wins at the Prefontaine Classic and the Weltklasse Zurich meets. He set a world-leading time in the 3000 m at the 2010 Rieti IAAF Grand Prix, running 7:28.70 to finish .30 seconds ahead of Bernard Lagat (who set an American record). The 2010 IAAF Continental Cup presented another opportunity as he was selected to represent Africa over 3000 m. Just as had happened indoors, he was fourth and out of the medals while Lagat took the honours. Tariku took to the roads at the end of the track season, competing at the 10-mile Dam tot Damloop race, but he could only manage sixth place with a time of 46:44. He then ran at the Memorial Peppe Greco and finished as runner-up, beaten to the line by a second by defending champion Edwin Soi.

In 2011 he competed on the 2011 IAAF Diamond League circuit, coming third over 5000 m at the Adidas Grand Prix and fourth over two miles at the Prefontaine Classic. His season's best run of 12:55.47 minutes came at the Herculis meeting in Monaco. He was selected as a back-up runner for the Ethiopian team at the 2011 World Championships, but did not compete. He ended the year with a win at the Saint Silvester Road Race, becoming only the second Ethiopian to win the race after Tesfaye Jifar.

He guaranteed his selection for the 2012 London Olympics with a 10,000 m win at the FBK Games in May 2012 and a personal best run of 27:03.24 minutes to finish second to his brother Kenenisa at the United Kingdom trials. At the Olympic 10,000 m final Tariku finished ahead of his brother to edge into the bronze medal spot and finish as Africa's top performer in the event – it was his first major outdoor medal on the global stage. After the Olympics he competed in a number of road races. He won the Giro di Castelbuono 10K, placed third at the Great South Run and recorded a time of 62:59 minutes in his half marathon debut in Lisbon. He again closed the year with a New Year race win, this time with a personal best run of 28:29 minutes at the San Silvestre Vallecana 10K.

== Statistics ==
=== International competitions ===
Year	Competition	Venue	Position	Event	Notes
Representing Ethiopia
2003	World Youth Championships	Sherbrooke, Canada	2nd	3000 m	7:54.71
2004	World Junior Championships	Grosseto, Italy	3rd	5000 m	13:30.86
2004	World Athletics Final	Monte Carlo, Monaco	10th	5000 m	13:18.98
2005	World Championships	Helsinki, Finland	7th	5000 m	13:34.76
2005	World Athletics Final	Monte Carlo, Monaco	5th	3000 m	7:40.30
2006	World Indoor Championships	Moscow, Russia	6th	3000 m	7:47.67
2006	World Cross Country Championships	Fukuoka, Japan	3rd	Junior (8 km)	23:56
2006	World Junior Championships	Beijing, China	1st	5000 m	13:31.34
2006	World Athletics Final	Stuttgart, Germany	1st	3000 m	7:42:45
2006	World Athletics Final	Stuttgart, Germany	4th	5000 m	13:50.03
2007	All-Africa Games	Algiers, Algeria	3rd	5000 m	13:13.43
2007	World Championships	Osaka, Japan	5th	5000 m	13:47.33
2008	World Indoor Championships	Valencia, Spain	1st	3000 m	7:48.23
2008	African Championships	Addis Ababa, Ethiopia	4th	5000 m	13:53.03
2008	Olympic Games	Beijing, China	6th	5000 m	13:19.06
2010	World Indoor Championships	Doha, Qatar	4th	3000 m	7:40.10
2010	African Championships	Nairobi, Kenya	6th	5000 m	13:42.41
2012	Olympic Games	London, United Kingdom	3rd	10000 m	27:31.43

=== Marathons ===
Year	Competition	Venue	Position	Event	Notes
2017	Chuncheon Marathon	Chuncheon, South Korea	2nd	Marathon	2:09:33
2018	Xiamen International Marathon	Xiamen, China	2nd	Marathon	2:11:29
2018	JTBC Seoul Marathon	Seoul, South Korea	7th	Marathon	2:09:30
2019	JTBC Seoul Marathon	Seoul, South Korea	6th	Marathon	2:11:30
2020	Houston Marathon	Houston, Texas	7th	Marathon	2:15:26

=== Personal bests ===
Distance	Mark	Date	Location
3000 metres	7:28.70	29 August 2010	Rieti, Italy
5000 metres	12:52.45	1 June 2008	Berlin, Germany
10,000 metres	27:03.24	22 June 2012	Birmingham, United Kingdom
Half marathon	1:02:11	12 September 2014	Chicago, Illinois
Marathon	2:09:30		Seoul, South Korea
