= Joseph Ebuya =

Kenyan long-distance runner (born 1987)

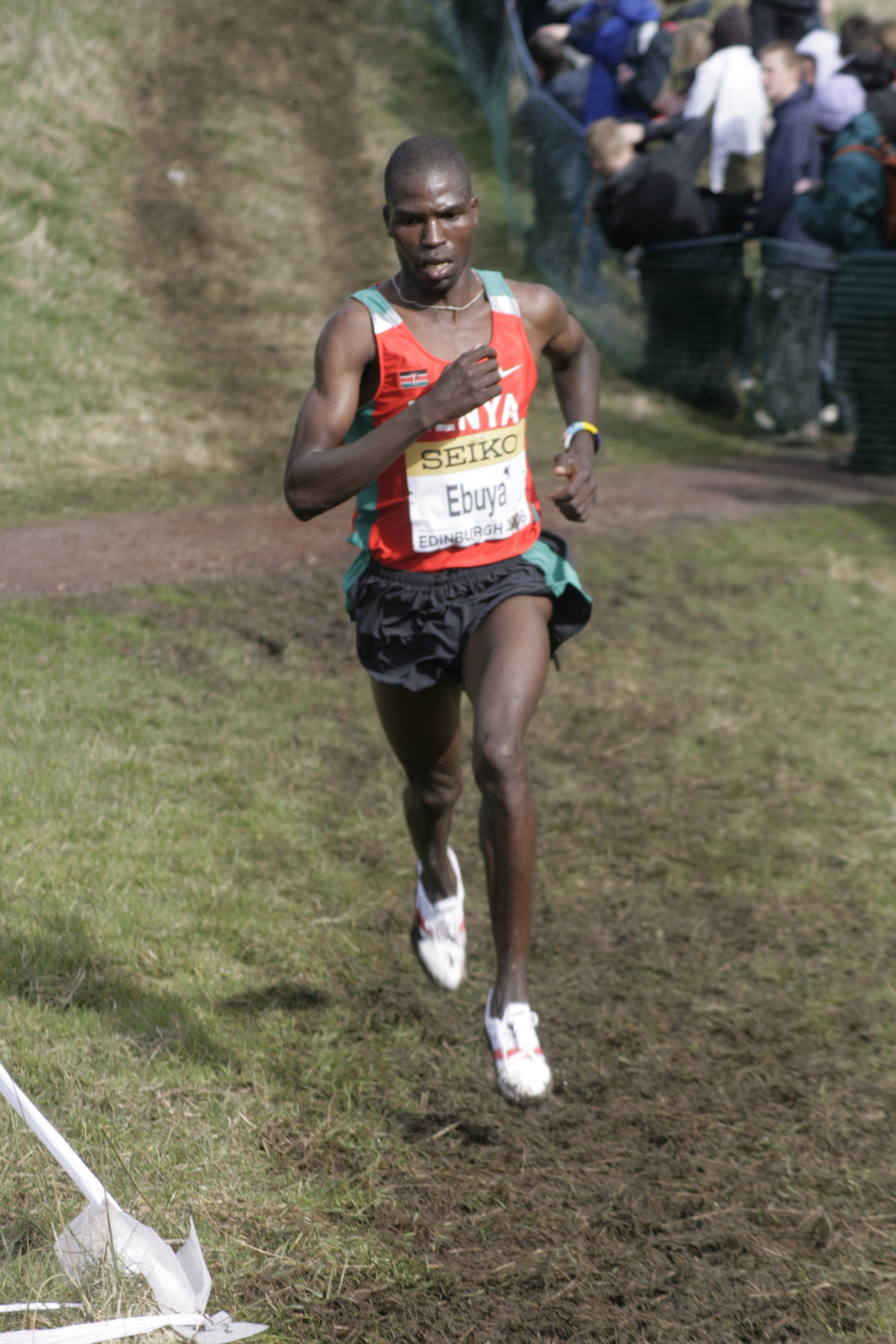
- Joseph Ebuya at the IAAF World Cross Country Championships 2008 in Edinburgh

Personal information
- Full name: Joseph Ebuya
- Nationality: Kenyan
- Born: 20 June 1987 (age 39) Baragoi, Kenya

Sport
- Country: Kenya
- Sport: Athletics
- Event(s): 5000 metres, 10,000 metres, Cross country
- Club: PACE Sports Management

Achievements and titles
- Personal best(s): 5000 m: 12:51.00 (2007); 10,000 m: 28:53.46 (2006)
Medal record
Men's athletics
Representing Kenya
World Cross Country Championships
| Gold medal – first place | 2010 Bydgoszcz | Senior race |
| Gold medal – first place | 2010 Bydgoszcz | Team |
| Gold medal – first place | 2008 Edinburgh | Team |
| Gold medal – first place | 2006 Fukuoka | Team (junior) |
World Junior Championships
| Silver medal – second place | 2006 Beijing | 10,000 m |
| Bronze medal – third place | 2006 Beijing | 5000 m |
World Athletics Final
| Silver medal – second place | 2007 Stuttgart | 3000 m |

Joseph Ebuya (born 20 June 1987) is a Kenyan professional runner who specialises in the 5000 metres and was the 2010 IAAF World Cross Country Championships champion.

== Early life and career ==
Ebuya is a rare example of a runner representing the Turkana people. He was born in Baragoi, but moved with his family from place to place, including Rumuruti and Nyahururu. He is based at the PACE Sports Management training camp in Kaptagat. His sister, Alice Aprot, is also a runner and an African champion.

He began running competitively in 2003 after having seen Benjamin Limo (among others), doing training runs. Ebuya looked to follow and emulate Limo. Ebuya began to reach the elite level in 2005, representing the Rift Valley Province at the Kenyan Championships before heading to the European track and field circuit. Quick performances over 5000 metres in the Netherlands led to an appearance at the Memorial van Damme Golden League meeting later that season.

His first opportunity to compete internationally for Kenya came at the 2006 Commonwealth Games in Melbourne and he just finished outside of the medals in the 5000 metres, beaten into fourth place by Fabiano Joseph Naasi. The following month he ran in the junior race at the 2006 IAAF World Cross Country Championships. Again he was fourth, this time beaten by Tariku Bekele), although he shared in the team victory with Mangata Ndiwa and Leonard Komon. Success awaited him on the track at the 2006 World Junior Championships in Athletics, as he took the bronze medal over 5000 m. He was called upon to compete in the 10,000 metres as Kenya's representative Thomas Longosiwa was found to be overage. The situation worked in Ebuya's favour as he ran a personal best of 28:53.46 which brought him the silver medal behind Ethiopian teenager Ibrahim Jeilan. Eighth place at the 2006 IAAF World Athletics Final rounded off his first season of international competition.

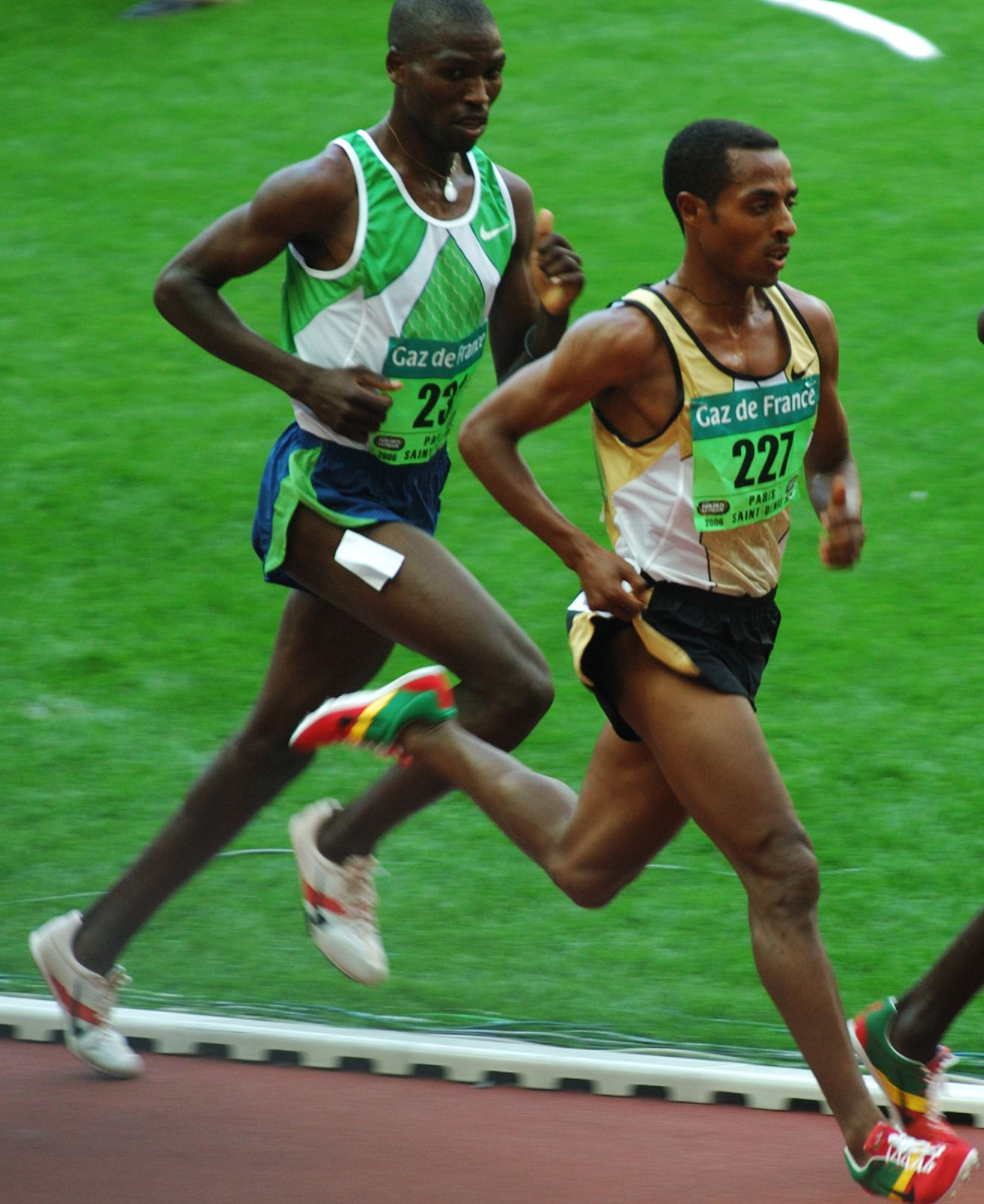
Ebuya shadowing Kenenisa Bekele on the 2006 Golden League circuit

He had mixed fortunes in 2007: he missed out on a place in the Kenyan world cross country team, although he secured a place in the 5000 m for the 2007 World Championships in Athletics by finishing as runner-up at the Kenyan track trials. He misjudged his run in the heats at the championships, however, and a decision to stick within the pack in a slow race saw him out-sprinted and eliminated in the first round. He sought to make up for his abortive start at the senior global level by focusing on the circuit. He was in the top four in two Golden League meets and went on to take a silver medal over 3000 metres at the 2007 IAAF World Athletics Final.

== World Cross Country gold ==
He was fourth in the senior race at the 2008 IAAF World Cross Country Championships, helping Kenya to the team gold. He ran in the 5000 m at the 2009 World Championships in Athletics and reached the final, although he placed thirteenth in the race.

He signalled his strong form at the start of 2010 with a win at the Great Edinburgh Cross Country, beating elite opposition in Eliud Kipchoge and Kenenisa Bekele. He followed this up by taking the men's senior title at the 2010 IAAF World Cross Country Championships, succeeding the absent Kenenisa Bekele to bring an end to a decade-long break for Kenya, whose last winner had been Paul Tergat in 1999.

He competed on the road running circuit later that year and set a United Kingdom all-comers record for the 10-mile distance with a win at the Great South Run. His time of 45:16 was the fastest of the season and knocked over 40 seconds off the previous UK-soil record – a mark achieved at the same race fifteen years earlier by Benson Masya. He ran at the Cross de Atapuerca in November but was outdone by world silver medallist Teklemariam Medhin in the final straight and had to settle for second. He became the first athlete to win twice at the Soria meeting by out-kicking Mathew Kisorio a few weeks later, and also won the Cross de l'Acier and Cross de la Constitución titles. He continued his strong form into 2011, winning in Amorebieta and at the Campaccio. The Kenyan National Cross Country Championships in February proved to be the undoing of his cross season, as he failed to finish and missed opportunities to defend his world title and compete at the African Cross Country Championships.

Competing on the roads, he took third at the UAE Healthy Kidney 10K behind Leonard Komon and Micah Kogo – both world record breakers in the event. An injury ruled him out for the rest of the track and road racing seasons and he made a return in November to win the Cross de l'Acier for a second time, beating the 2011 World Champion Imane Merga. He was beaten into second by Kidane Tadese at the Cross de la Constitución, but retained his title at the Cross Zornotza.

== International competitions ==
| Year | Competition | Venue | Position | Event | Notes |
|---|---|---|---|---|---|
| 2006 | Commonwealth Games | Melbourne, Australia | 4th | 5000 m | 13:05.89 |
| 2006 | World Cross Country Championships | Fukuoka, Japan | 4th | Junior race (8 km) | 23:59 |
| 2006 | World Cross Country Championships | Fukuoka, Japan | 1st | Team | 16 pts |
| 2006 | World Junior Championships | Beijing, China | 3rd | 5000m | 13:42.93 |
| 2006 | World Junior Championships | Beijing, China | 2nd | 10,000m | 28:53.46 PB |
| 2006 | World Athletics Final | Stuttgart, Germany | 8th | 3000 m | 7:43.31 |
| 2007 | World Championships | Osaka, Japan | 20th (heats) | 5000 m | 13:48.21 |
| 2007 | World Athletics Final | Stuttgart, Germany | 2nd | 3000 m | 7:49.70 |
| 2007 | World Athletics Final | Stuttgart, Germany | 4th | 5000 m | 13:40.43 |
| 2008 | World Cross Country Championships | Edinburgh, Scotland | 4th | Senior race (12 km) | 34:47 |
| 2008 | World Cross Country Championships | Edinburgh, Scotland | 1st | Team | 39 pts |
| 2009 | World Championships | Berlin, Germany | 13th | 5000 m | 13:39.59 |
| 2010 | World Cross Country Championships | Bydgoszcz, Poland | 1st | Senior race (11.611 km) | 33:00 |
| 2010 | World Cross Country Championships | Bydgoszcz, Poland | 1st | Team | 20 pts |

=== Personal bests ===
- 3000 metres – 7:34.66 min (2007)
- 5000 metres – 12:51.00 min (2007)
- 10,000 metres – 28:53.46 min (2006)
