= Cheseret =

Cheseret is a surname of Kenyan origin. Notable people with the surname include:

- Robert Cheseret (born 1983), Kenyan-American long-distance runner
- William Cheseret (born 1971), Kenyan long-distance runner and twice winner at the Auray-Vannes Half Marathon
