= 1998 World Junior Championships in Athletics – Men's 5000 metres =

The men's 5000 metres event at the 1998 World Junior Championships in Athletics was held in Annecy, France, at Parc des Sports on 31 July and 2 August.

== Medalists ==
Gold	Million Wolde; Ethiopia
Silver	Kipchumba Mitei; Kenya
Bronze	Reuben Kamzee; Kenya

== Results ==
=== Final ===
2 August

Rank	Name	Nationality	Time	Notes
1st place, gold medalist(s)	Million Wolde	Ethiopia	13:47.49	
2nd place, silver medalist(s)	Kipchumba Mitei	Kenya	13:49.60	
3rd place, bronze medalist(s)	Reuben Kamzee	Kenya	13:51.22	
4	Mark Thompson	Australia	14:06.24	
5	Haylu Mekonnen	Ethiopia	14:06.30	
6	Yuji Ibi	Japan	14:06.63	
7	Driss Benismail	Morocco	14:06.83	
8	Bonaventure Niyonizigiye	Burundi	14:07.65	
9	Dmitriy Baranovskiy	Ukraine	14:07.77	
10	Audace Niyongabo	Burundi	14:09.64	
11	Vincent Kuotane	South Africa	14:15.90	
12	Obed Mutanya	Zambia	14:19.50	
13	Sam Haughian	United Kingdom	14:32.66	
14	Takhir Mamashayev	Kazakhstan	14:34.32	
	Ahmed Baday	Morocco	DQ	IAAF rule 141

=== Heats ===
31 July

==== Heat 1 ====
Rank	Name	Nationality	Time	Notes
1	Million Wolde	Ethiopia	14:07.50	Q
2	Reuben Kamzee	Kenya	14:07.61	Q
3	Bonaventure Niyonizigiye	Burundi	14:07.80	Q
4	Driss Benismail	Morocco	14:09.12	Q
5	Yuji Ibi	Japan	14:09.24	Q
6	Dmitriy Baranovskiy	Ukraine	14:09.57	q
7	Mark Thompson	Australia	14:22.47	q
8	Takhir Mamashayev	Kazakhstan	14:27.13	q
9	Vincent Kuotane	South Africa	14:27.95	q
10	Koen Raymaekers	Netherlands	14:28.94	
11	Mikola Mestechkin	Ukraine	14:54.74	
12	Rashid Taimu	Malawi	14:56.82	
13	Michael May	Germany	15:08.92	
14	Adrian Blincoe	New Zealand	15:30.97	

==== Heat 2 ====
Rank	Name	Nationality	Time	Notes
1	Haylu Mekonnen	Ethiopia	14:25.00	Q
2	Kipchumba Mitei	Kenya	14:25.14	Q
3	Obed Mutanya	Zambia	14:26.62	Q
4	Sam Haughian	United Kingdom	14:27.05	Q
5	Audace Niyongabo	Burundi	14:27.62	q
6	Ryan Andrus	United States	14:28.54	
7	George Mofokeng	South Africa	14:56.98	
8	Mattia Maccagnan	Italy	15:01.91	
9	Siphesihle Mdluli	Swaziland	15:07.43	
10	Shinichi Shibata	Japan	15:10.32	
11	Kabirou Dan Mallam	Niger	15:15.29	
12	Vishwananth Sukmongal	Guyana	15:44.96	
	Ahmed Baday	Morocco	DQ	IAAF rule 141 Q

== Participation ==
According to an unofficial count, 27 athletes from 20 countries participated in the event.

- Australia (1)
- Burundi (2)
- Ethiopia (2)
- Germany (1)
- Guyana (1)
- Italy (1)
- Japan (2)
- Kazakhstan (1)
- Kenya (2)
- Malawi (1)
- Morocco (2)
- Netherlands (1)
- New Zealand (1)
- Niger (1)
- South Africa (2)
- Swaziland (1)
- Ukraine (2)
- United Kingdom (1)
- United States (1)
- Zambia (1)
