= Songok =

Songok is a surname of Kenyan origin that may refer to:

- Boniface Songok (born 1980), Kenyan long-distance track runner
- Isaac Kiprono Songok (born 1984), Kenyan middle and long-distance runner
- Kimaru Songok (born 1936), Kenyan 400 metres hurdler and first All-Africa Games champion

== See also ==
- Jong Song-ok, North Korean marathon runner and 1999 world champion
