= 2008 African Championships in Athletics – Men's 5000 metres =

The men's 5000 metres event at the 2008 African Championships in Athletics was held at the Addis Ababa Stadium on May 4.

== Results ==
Rank	Name	Nationality	Time	Notes
1st place, gold medalist(s)	Kenenisa Bekele	Ethiopia	13:49.67	
2nd place, silver medalist(s)	Isaac Kiprono Songok	Kenya	13:49.91	
3rd place, bronze medalist(s)	Ali Abdosh	Ethiopia	13:50.64	
4	Tariku Bekele	Ethiopia	13:53.03	
5	Josphat Kiprono Menjo	Kenya	13:56.21	
6	Joseph Kiplimo	Kenya	14:10.14	
7	Boy Soke	South Africa	14:13.45	
8	Tonny Wamulwa	Zambia	14:20.31	
9	Sylvain Rukundo	Rwanda	14:32.77	
10	Etienne Bizimana	Burundi	14:40.57	
11	Matjeane Masilo	Lesotho	14:41.41	
12	Joseph Maroco	Tanzania	14:54.66	
13	Audace Baguma	Burundi	14:57.48	
14	Mohamed Ali Mohamed	Somalia	15:15.67	
15	Arnold Loningo	Tanzania	15:27.65	
16	Abdinasir Said Ibrahim	Somalia	16:05.62	
17	Youssouf Houssein Nour	Djibouti	16:26.89	
18	Abdi Said Yabeh	Djibouti	16:48.25	
19	Ibrahim Ismael Hassan	Djibouti	17:28.19	
	Alban Rony Ampion	Republic of the Congo	DNF	
	Minkael Camara	Guinea	DNF	
	Mande Ilunga	Democratic Republic of the Congo	DNF	
	Ansu Sowe	Gambia	DNS	
	Yahaya Nahantchi	Niger	DNS	
