= Auray-Vannes Half Marathon =

Road running event in Brittany, France

The Auray-Vannes Half Marathon (French: Semi-marathon d'Auray-Vannes) is an annual road running competition over the half marathon distance (21.097 km) which takes place in early September in Brittany, France. The point-to-point course begins in the commune of Auray and finishes in the Stade de Kercado in nearby Vannes. Nearly 5000 people participated in the event in 2011. A record 6378 runners finished the half marathon in 1999.

The event was first held on 14 September 1975 under the organisation of the event-dedicated Association Courrir Auray Vannes and it has been held every September thereafter. In addition to the main half marathon, there are jogging and walking activities available as well as the shorter 10 km Arradon Vannes run (first held in 2001). The events take place around the natural harbour of the Gulf of Morbihan.

The half marathon competition attracts both amateur and elite-level competitors. The men's course record of 1:02:12 hours was set in 2001 by Kenya's William Cheseret. Rose Chelimo, another Kenyan, set the women's course record of 1:11:27 hours at the 2011 edition. In 1999, the competition acted as the French men's national championship race and Abdellah Béhar won the title. The race received IAAF Bronze Label Road Race classification in 2011 and 2012.

== Past winners ==
=== Early editions ===
- The course distance varied in the early years of the competitions. It began as a 24 km race, was 26 km in its second edition, then 25 km for the third edition. A 22.8 km course was used from 1978 to 1984. The race distance was 25 km for the 1985–1991 competitions.

Edition	Year	Men's winner	Time (h:m:s)	Women's winner	Time (h:m:s)
1st	1975	Daniel LeNoach (FRA)	1:19:32	Not held	—
2nd	1976	Bernard Sehedic (FRA)	1:24:37	Marie-Madeleine Bastard (FRA)	2:06:30
3rd	1977	Bernard Sehedic (FRA)	1:22:30	Marie-Madeleine Bastard (FRA)	2:02:16
4th	1978	Jean-Luc Paugam (FRA)	1:15:18	Anne-Marie Goldstein (FRA)	1:43:00
5th	1979	Armel LeBorgne (FRA)	1:15:48	Marie-Madeleine Bastard (FRA)	1:43:09
6th	1980	Jean-Paul LeGall (FRA)	1:13:42	Mme. Poudelet (FRA)	1:44:25
7th	1981	Maurice Benn (GBR)	1:12:46	Mme. Poudelet (FRA)	1:38:14
8th	1982	Jacques LeFrand (FRA)	1:11:14	Chantal LeGoff (FRA)	1:32:30
9th	1983	Jacques LeFrand (FRA)	1:09:53	Maryse Langin (FRA)	1:31:00
10th	1984	Philippe Daniel (FRA)	1:10:26	Mme. Bainvel (FRA)	1:28:47
11th	1985	Jean-Pierre Savary (FRA)	1:18:52	Maryse LeGallo (FRA)	1:38:22
12th	1986	Jean-Yves Kerbiriou (FRA)	1:20:20	Annemarie Jutel (FRA)	1:35:23
13th	1987	Didier Bernard (FRA)	1:17:51	Maryse LeGallo (FRA)	1:38:41
14th	1988	Nourredine Sobhi (FRA)	1:19:13	Maryse LeGallo (FRA)	1:31:27
15th	1989	Mohamed El Massaoudi (FRA)	1:18:45	Maryse LeGallo (FRA)	1:34:38
16th	1990	? Kaddour (ALG)	1:18:14	Isabelle LeFlamand (FRA)	1:38:05
17th	1991	Pierre Levisse (FRA)	1:18:28	Sylviane Geffray (FRA)	1:30:54

=== Half marathon ===
Key: Course record French championship race

Edition	Year	Men's winner	Time (h:m:s)	Women's winner	Time (h:m:s)
18th	1992	Alexandre Gonzalez (FRA)	1:05:25	Irina Kazakova (FRA)	1:15:46
19th	1993	Lameck Aguta (KEN)	1:03:56	Annie Coathalem (FRA)	1:22:57
20th	1994	Joseph Kamau (KEN)	1:03:13	Nicole Leveque (FRA)	1:11:35
21st	1995	John Gwako (KEN)	1:02:40	Antonina Andronakiy (MDA)	1:12:40
22nd	1996	John Gwako (KEN)	1:03:09	Lucia Subano (KEN)	1:14:01
23rd	1997	Evans Otieno Oichoe (KEN)	1:02:37	Isabella Ochichi (KEN)	1:14:55
24th	1998	David Ndegwa Maina (KEN)	1:02:41	Fatiha Klilech (MAR)	1:15:28
25th	1999	Abdellah Béhar (FRA)	1:02:49	Fatima Yvelain (FRA)	1:14:39
26th	2000	William Cheseret (KEN)	1:05:43	Fatiha Klilech (MAR)	1:17:32
27th	2001	William Cheseret (KEN)	1:02:12	Nadezhda Zolotaryova (RUS)	1:13:46
28th	2002	George Morara (KEN)	1:02:36	Daniela Ciocan (ROM)	1:14:36
29th	2003	Abdelilah El Manaia (FRA)	1:04:10	Yelena Kaledina (RUS)	1:19:17
30th	2004	Julius Chanchima (KEN)	1:03:08	Esther Wanjiru (KEN)	1:14:02
31st	2005	David Langat (KEN)	1:03:53	Angelina Mutuku Mutheu (KEN)	1:15:32
32nd	2006	Abdellah Falil (MAR)	1:04:17	Jacqueline Okemwa (KEN)	1:17:59
33rd	2007	Christopher Soget (KEN)	1:05:09	Eunice Orwaru (KEN)	1:18:24
34th	2008	Musau Mwanzia (KEN)	1:03:24	Alice Serser (KEN)	1:14:18
35th	2009	Isaiah Ondieki (KEN)	1:03:51	Sarah Chepchirchir (KEN)	1:14:55
36th	2010	Justus Moranga (KEN)	1:03:50	Sarah Chepchirchir (KEN)	1:13:46
37th	2011	Evans Kosgei (KEN)	1:02:21	Rose Chelimo (KEN)	1:11:27
38th	2012	Geoffrey Kenesi (KEN)	1:02:35	Gladys Kipsoi (KEN)	1:12:14
39th	2013	Raymond Kemboi Chemugor (KEN)	1:02:16	Kateryna Karmanenko (UKR)	1:16:55
40th	2014	Raymond Kemboi Chemugor (KEN)	1:03:44	Chaltu Bedo (ETH)	1:16:59
41st	2015	Abraham Niyonkuru (BDI)	1:03:20	Betty Murungi (KEN)	1:15:57
42nd	2016	Barnabas Kipyego (KEN)	1:03:59	Susan Kipsang (KEN)	1:12:28
43rd	2017	Getinet Gedamu (ETH)	1:03:49	Susan Kipsang (KEN)	1:14:59
