= 2004 World Junior Championships in Athletics – Men's 5000 metres =

The men's 5000 metres event at the 2004 World Junior Championships in Athletics was held in Grosseto, Italy, at Stadio Olimpico Carlo Zecchini on 18 July.

== Medalists ==
Gold	Augustine Choge; Kenya
Silver	Bado Worku; Ethiopia
Bronze	Tariku Bekele; Ethiopia

== Results ==
=== Final ===
18 July

Rank	Name	Nationality	Time	Notes
1st place, gold medalist(s)	Augustine Choge	Kenya	13:28.93	
2nd place, silver medalist(s)	Bado Worku	Ethiopia	13:30.45	
3rd place, bronze medalist(s)	Tariku Bekele	Ethiopia	13:30.86	
4	Sultan Khamis Zaman	Qatar	13:32.33	
5	Boniface Kiprop	Uganda	13:33.18	
6	Fabiano Joseph	Tanzania	13:33.62	
7	Henry Kemo Sugut	Kenya	13:40.77	
8	Yassine Mandour	Morocco	13:50.82	
9	Galen Rupp	United States	13:52.85	
10	Satoru Kitamura	Japan	13:53.15	
11	Anatoliy Rybakov	Russia	13:54.29	
12	Joshua McDougal	United States	14:07.55	
13	Yuki Sato	Japan	14:15.62	
14	Aloys Nzambimana	Burundi	14:16.89	
15	Mohamed Kallouche	Morocco	14:19.69	
16	Stefano La Rosa	Italy	14:20.51	
17	Yonas Mebrahtu	Eritrea	14:25.69	
18	Ajmal Amirov	Tajikistan	14:25.86	
19	Dušan Markešević	Serbia and Montenegro	14:30.28	
20	Zelalem Martel	Germany	14:58.88	
21	Mark Christie	Ireland	15:03.41	
	Zolile Bhitane	South Africa	DNF	

== Participation ==
According to an unofficial count, 22 athletes from 17 countries participated in the event.

- Burundi (1)
- Eritrea (1)
- Ethiopia (2)
- Germany (1)
- Ireland (1)
- Italy (1)
- Japan (2)
- Kenya (2)
- Morocco (2)
- Qatar (1)
- Russia (1)
- Serbia and Montenegro (1)
- South Africa (1)
- Tajikistan (1)
- Tanzania (1)
- Uganda (1)
- United States (2)
