= 2004 African Championships in Athletics – Men's 5000 metres =

The men's 5000 metres event at the 2004 African Championships in Athletics was held in Brazzaville, Republic of the Congo on July 18.

== Results ==
Rank	Name	Nationality	Time	Notes
1st place, gold medalist(s)	Terefe Maregu	Ethiopia	13:47.77	
2nd place, silver medalist(s)	Boniface Songok	Kenya	13:48.06	
3rd place, bronze medalist(s)	Hillary Chenonge	Kenya	13:48.44	
4	Ali Abdosh	Ethiopia	13:49.93	
5	Ahmed Baday	Morocco	13:51.01	
6	Venant Nyabenda	Burundi	14:25.05	
7	Abdelhalim Zahraoui	Morocco	14:28.43	
8	Joaquim Francisco Chamane	Angola	14:37.44	
9	Audace Niyongabo	Burundi	14:45.64	
10	Abdoulaye Abdelkerim	Chad	15:11.63	
11	Alain Nkulu Ngoy	Democratic Republic of the Congo	15:27.15	
12	Elmi Kawrah	Djibouti	16:08.56	
12	Hugues Kombila	Gabon	16:41.36	
	Gouled Allaleh	Djibouti	DNF	
