= Mark Kiptoo =

Kenyan long-distance runner

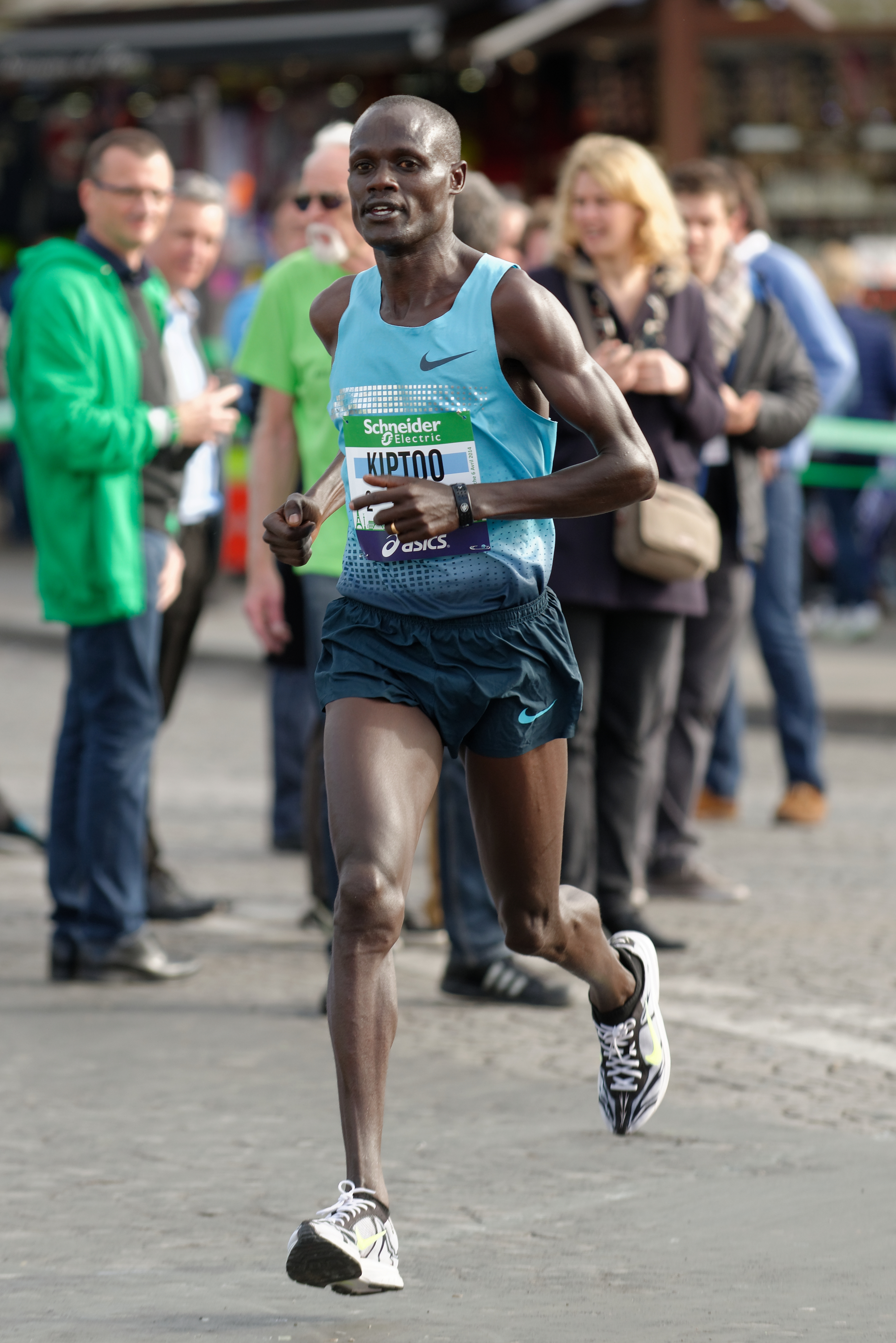
- Kiptoo at the 2014 Paris Marathon

Medal record

Men's athletics

Representing Kenya

Military World Games
Gold medal – first place	2007 Hyderabad	5000 m
Gold medal – first place	2011 Rio de Janeiro	5000 m
Silver medal – second place	2007 Hyderabad	10,000 m

Commonwealth Games
Bronze medal – third place	2010 New Delhi	5000 m

African Championships
Gold medal – first place	2012 Porto-Novo	5000 m
Silver medal – second place	2012 Porto-Novo	10,000 m
Bronze medal – third place	2010 Nairobi	5000 m

Mark Kosgey Kiptoo (born 21 June 1976) is a Kenyan long-distance runner who set the world record in the marathon for the Masters age group (40 and over) by running 2:07:50 in the 2018 Frankfurt Marathon. He also specialized in the 5000 metres throughout his career. He is a two-time gold medalist in the event at the Military World Games and won bronze medals over the distance at the 2010 Commonwealth Games and the 2010 African Championships in Athletics. He has also represented Kenya at the IAAF World Cross Country Championships and the All-Africa Games.

His personal best times are 7:32.97 minutes in the 3000 metres, achieved in May 2009 in Doha; 12:53.46 minutes in the 5000 metres, achieved in August 2010; and 27:14.67 minutes in the 10,000 metres, achieved in June 2008 in Eugene.

== Career ==
Born in Lumino Village in Kenya's Lugari District, Kiptoo attended Lumino Primary School then Mukumu Boys High School. Following his graduation in 1996, he joined the Kenyan Armed Forces. He trained at an air-force technical college for four years and was later posted at Laikipia Air Base in 2002. It was during his time at the base that he was encouraged to take part in athletics, representing his technical squad. During 2005 and 2006 he was sent as part of the Kenyan peace-keeping contingent of the United Nations Operation in Burundi in the final period of the Burundi Civil War.

Kiptoo returned to Kenya in May 2006 and at the age of thirty set about preparing himself for the Kenyan 2006/2007 cross country running season. He reached the top ten in two of the Athletics Kenya Cross Country Series meets in November then earned a place at the Kenya National Cross Country Championships after coming tenth at the Armed Forces Championships. He managed third place at the national championships but failed to make the team for the 2007 IAAF World Cross Country Championships after placing 12th at the trial event. He tried his hand at track running instead and ran a personal best of 13:12.60 minutes for the 5000 metres in Belgrade. He won the Army title over that distance and was then runner-up at the National Championships behind Thomas Longosiwa. This earned him his first international call-up for Kenya, although he managed only ninth place at the 2007 All-Africa Games in Algiers. Success followed later that year at the 2007 Military World Games, where he won the 5000 m and took second place behind compatriot John Cheruiyot Korir over 10,000 metres.

He was runner-up at the National Cross Country Trials the following year and competed for Kenya in that discipline for the first time, finishing 18th overall. At the 2008 World Athletics Final he finished sixth in the 3000 metres and fourth in the 5000 metres. At the 2009 World Athletics Final he finished eighth in the 3000 metres and fifth in the 5000 metres. He finished fourteenth at the 2008 World Cross Country Championships and seventh at the 2009 World Cross Country Championships. At the 2009 IAAF World Athletics Final he finished eighth in the 3000 metres. He also took part in road running competitions and finished as the runner-up at the 2009 World 10K Bangalore behind Deriba Merga.

At the 2010 African Championships in Athletics he formed part of a Kenyan podium sweep of the 5000 m taking bronze behind Edwin Soi and Vincent Yator. He ran a new personal best at the DN Galan Diamond League meeting, running 12:53.46 to secure a major circuit win over 5000 m. In light of these achievements, he earned selection for Kenya at the 2010 Commonwealth Games and he took the 5000 m bronze medal behind Moses Kipsiro and Eliud Kipchoge.

He opened his 2011 season with a podium finish at the Parelloop 10K in the Netherlands in April. At the 2011 Military World Games in Rio de Janeiro he retained his 5000 m title and set a games record time of 13:06.17 minutes. He did not perform so well in the 2011 All-Africa Games, as he finished 13th overall. He began his 2012 season with a win at the Armed Forces Cross Country. He failed in his bid to reach the Olympics, but was selected for the 2012 African Championships in Athletics where he won the 5000 m gold and the 10,000 m silver medals.

Mark Kiptoo won the 2nd Darıca Half Marathon, Turkey in a time 1:03:31 in 2012.

His 2013 started with a win at the Cross Zornotza. He failed to make the team for the 2013 World Championships in Athletics and, after winning the Azkoitia-Azpeitia Half Marathon, he instead focused on making a marathon debut. At the Frankfurt Marathon in October he presented a strong challenge to Vincent Kipruto and finished as runner-up one second behind his countryman, having a fast first attempt with 2:06:16 hours.
