= Ali Abdosh =

Ethiopian long-distance runner

Medal record

Men's athletics

Representing Ethiopia

African Championships
Bronze medal – third place	2008 Addis Ababa	5000 m

Ali Abdosh Mohammed (Amharic: አሊ አብዶሽ; born 25 August 1987) is an Ethiopian long-distance runner who specializes in the 5000 metres, cross-country running and road running.

He won the bronze medal at the 2008 African Championships, finished sixth at the 2009 World Championships and twelfth at the 2009 World Athletics Final.

== International competitions ==
Year	Competition	Venue	Position	Event	Notes
2004	African Championships	Brazzaville	4th	5000 m	
2005	African Junior Championships	Tunis	3rd	10,000 m	
2006	World Cross Country Championships	Fukuoka	5th	Short race	
2006	World Cross Country Championships	Fukuoka	2nd	Team competition	
2006	African Championships	Bambous	6th	5000 m	
2007	All-Africa Games	Algiers	5th	5000 m	
2008	African Championships	Addis Ababa	3rd	5000 m	
2009	World Championships	Berlin	6th	5000 m	
2009	World Athletics Final	Thessaloniki	12th	5000 m	
2010	World Half Marathon Championships	Nanning	27th		
2011	All-Africa Games	Maputo	9th	Half marathon	
2012	B.A.A. 10K	Boston	3rd		
2014	Santiago Marathon	Santiago	6th		
2015	Xiamen International Marathon	Xiamen	6th		
2015	Xichang Marathon	Xichang	2nd		

== Personal bests ==
- 5000 metres: 12:56.53 min, 4 September 2009, Brussels
- 10,000 metres: 27:04.92 min, 26 May 2007, Hengelo
- 10K run: 28:21 min, 24 June 2012, Boston
- Marathon: 2:12:55 h, 3 January 2015, Xiamen
