= 2006 African Championships in Athletics – Men's 5000 metres =

The men's 5000 metres event at the 2006 African Championships in Athletics was held at the Stade Germain Comarmond on August 9.

== Results ==
Rank	Name	Nationality	Time	Notes
1st place, gold medalist(s)	Kenenisa Bekele	Ethiopia	14:03.41	
2nd place, silver medalist(s)	Mike Kigen	Kenya	14:05.12	
3rd place, bronze medalist(s)	Moses Ndiema Kipsiro	Uganda	14:05.20	
4	Sammy Kipketer	Kenya	14:06.21	
5	Josphat Kiprono Menjo	Kenya	14:07.39	
6	Ali Abdosh	Ethiopia	14:07.40	
7	Ahmed Baday	Morocco	14:09.60	
8	Khoudir Aggoune	Algeria	14:10.06	
9	Damian Paul Chopa	Tanzania	14:11.27	
10	Audace Baguma	Burundi	14:11.81	
11	Boy Soke	South Africa	14:13.98	
12	Benny Degoto Gloum	Central African Republic	15:22.76	
