= 2006 World Junior Championships in Athletics – Men's 5000 metres =

The men's 5000 metres event at the 2006 World Junior Championships in Athletics was held in Beijing, China, at Chaoyang Sports Centre on 20 August.

== Medalists ==
Gold	Tariku Bekele; Ethiopia
Silver	Abreham Cherkos; Ethiopia
Bronze	Joseph Ebuya; Kenya

== Results ==
=== Final ===
20 August

Rank	Name	Nationality	Time	Notes
1st place, gold medalist(s)	Tariku Bekele	Ethiopia	13:31.34	
2nd place, silver medalist(s)	Abreham Cherkos	Ethiopia	13:35.95	
3rd place, bronze medalist(s)	Joseph Ebuya	Kenya	13:42.93	
4	Mang'ata Ndiwa	Kenya	13:44.03	
5	Aadam Ismaeel Khamis	Bahrain	13:51.44	
6	Kidane Tadese	Eritrea	13:51.60	
7	Tony Wamulwa	Zambia	14:00.95	
8	Noureddine Smaïl	France	14:06.86	
9	Geoffrey Kusuro	Uganda	14:12.69	
10	Naser Jamal Naser	Qatar	14:15.10	
11	Diego Borrego	Mexico	14:15.54	
12	Teklemariam Medhin	Eritrea	14:18.57	
13	Zhao Bing	China	14:19.33	
14	Mohamed Bouifalloussene	Morocco	14:22.38	
15	Saleh Bakheet	Bahrain	14:23.50	
16	Simon Ayeko	Uganda	14:26.23	
17	Mohamed Elbendir	Spain	14:28.27	
18	Takahiro Mori	Japan	14:29.00	
19	Huang Dali	China	14:30.83	
20	Kodai Matsumoto	Japan	14:35.55	
21	Jeon Eunhoi	South Korea	14:35.64	
22	Yosef Abo Saman	Palestine	16:02.18	
	Mouhssine Cherkaoui	Morocco	DQ	

== Participation ==
According to an unofficial count, 23 athletes from 15 countries participated in the event.

- Bahrain (2)
- China (2)
- Eritrea (2)
- Ethiopia (2)
- France (1)
- Japan (2)
- Kenya (2)
- Mexico (1)
- Morocco (2)
- Palestine (1)
- Qatar (1)
- South Korea (1)
- Spain (1)
- Uganda (2)
- Zambia (1)
