= 2012 African Championships in Athletics – Men's 10,000 metres =

The men's 10,000 metres at the 2012 African Championships in Athletics was held at the Stade Charles de Gaulle on 28 June.

== Medalists ==
Gold	Kenneth Kipkemoi; Kenya
Silver	Mark Kiptoo; Kenya
Bronze	Lewis Mosoti; Kenya

== Records ==
Standing records prior to the 2012 African Championships in Athletics
World record	Kenenisa Bekele (ETH)	26:17.53	Brussels, Belgium	26 August 2005
African record	Kenenisa Bekele (ETH)	26:17.53	Brussels, Belgium	26 August 2005
Championship record	William Sigei (KEN)	27:25.33	Durban, South Africa	24 June 1993
Broken records during the 2012 African Championships in Athletics
Championship record	Kenneth Kipkemoi (KEN)	27:19.74	Porto-Novo, Benin	28 June 2012

== Schedule ==
Date	Time	Round
28 June 2012	17:45	Final

== Results ==
=== Final ===
Rank	Name	Nationality	Time	Note
1st place, gold medalist(s)	Kenneth Kipkemoi	Kenya	27:19.74	CR
2nd place, silver medalist(s)	Mark Kiptoo	Kenya	27:20.77	
3rd place, bronze medalist(s)	Lewis Mosoti	Kenya	27:22.54	
4	Tebalu Zawude	Ethiopia	28:03.16	
5	Robert Kajuga	Rwanda	28:03.24	
6	Olivier Irabaruta	Burundi	28:17.77	
7	Vianney Ndiho	Burundi	28:25.57	
8	Stephen Mokoka	South Africa	28:49.14	
	Solomon Deksisa	Ethiopia	DNF	
	Gebretsadik Abraha	Ethiopia	DNF	
	Hezekiel Jafari	Tanzania	DNS	
	Thomas Ayeko	Uganda	DNS	
	Ibrahim Ismael	Djibouti	DNS	
	Abdenacer Fathi	Morocco	DNS	
