= Kipsigak =

Kipsigak is a village near Kapsabet in Nandi County, Kenya. Administratively, Kipsigak is a location in Kilibwoni division of Nandi County. Its local authority is Kapsabet municipality and constituency is Emgwen.

It is the birthplace of Kenyan runner Augustine Kiprono Choge.
