= 2006 World Junior Championships in Athletics – Men's 10,000 metres =

The men's 10,000 metres event at the 2006 World Junior Championships in Athletics was held in Beijing, China, at Chaoyang Sports Centre on 16 August.

== Medalists ==
Gold	Ibrahim Jeylan; Ethiopia
Silver	Joseph Ebuya; Kenya
Bronze	Aadam Ismaeel Khamis; Bahrain

== Results ==
=== Final ===
16 August

Rank	Name	Nationality	Time	Notes
1st place, gold medalist(s)	Ibrahim Jeylan	Ethiopia	28:53.29	
2nd place, silver medalist(s)	Joseph Ebuya	Kenya	28:53.46	
3rd place, bronze medalist(s)	Aadam Ismaeel Khamis	Bahrain	28:54.30	
4	Samuel Tsegay	Eritrea	28:58.09	
5	Abraham Niyonkuru	Burundi	28:59.92	
6	Dereje Tadesse	Ethiopia	29:04.46	
7	Mohamed Abduh Bakhet	Qatar	29:18.76	
8	Ren Longyun	China	29:19.25	
9	Yuta Takahashi	Japan	29:33.98	
10	Sylvain Rukundo	Rwanda	29:47.96	
11	Naser Jamal Naser	Qatar	29:50.81	
12	Reginaldo Campos Jr.	Brazil	30:04.38	
13	Ezechiel Nizigiyimana	Burundi	30:08.98	
14	Huang Jinhong	China	30:20.32	
15	Daniel Chaves da Silva	Brazil	30:52.22	
16	Tuomas Jokinen	Finland	31:04.85	
17	Jake Schmitt	United States	31:38.22	
18	Ciprian Suhanea	Romania	33:53.40	
	Meles Okbazgi	Eritrea	DQ	IAAF rule 163.3
	Tsuyoshi Ugachi	Japan	DQ	IAAF rule 163.3
	Riad Guerfi	France	DNF	
	Jeon Eunhoi	South Korea	DNF	
	Andrea Lalli	Italy	DNF	

== Participation ==
According to an unofficial count, 23 athletes from 16 countries participated in the event.

- Bahrain (1)
- Brazil (2)
- Burundi (2)
- China (2)
- Eritrea (2)
- Ethiopia (2)
- Finland (1)
- France (1)
- Italy (1)
- Japan (2)
- Kenya (1)
- Qatar (2)
- Romania (1)
- Rwanda (1)
- South Korea (1)
- United States (1)
