= Gladys Kipsoi =

Kenyan long-distance runner

Gladys Kipsoi is a Kenyan long-distance runner.

In 2012, Kipsoi won the Auray-Vannes Half Marathon.

She won the 2013 Kampala Marathon.

In 2014, she was runner-up at the Mumbai Marathon.

She won the 2015 Reims à Toutes Jambes half marathon. She also won the 2015 New Taipei City Wan Jin Shi Mara.
