= George Mofokeng (runner) =

South African long-distance runner

George Mofokeng (born 19 February 1979) is a long-distance runner from South Africa, who twice won the national marathon title in his native country: in 2006 and 2007.

== Achievements ==
Year	Competition	Venue	Position	Event	Notes
Representing South Africa
1998	World Junior Championships	Annecy, France	19th (h)	5000m	14:56.98
2007	World Championships	Osaka, Japan	53rd	Marathon	2:40:22
