= Sarah Chepchirchir =

Kenyan long-distance runner

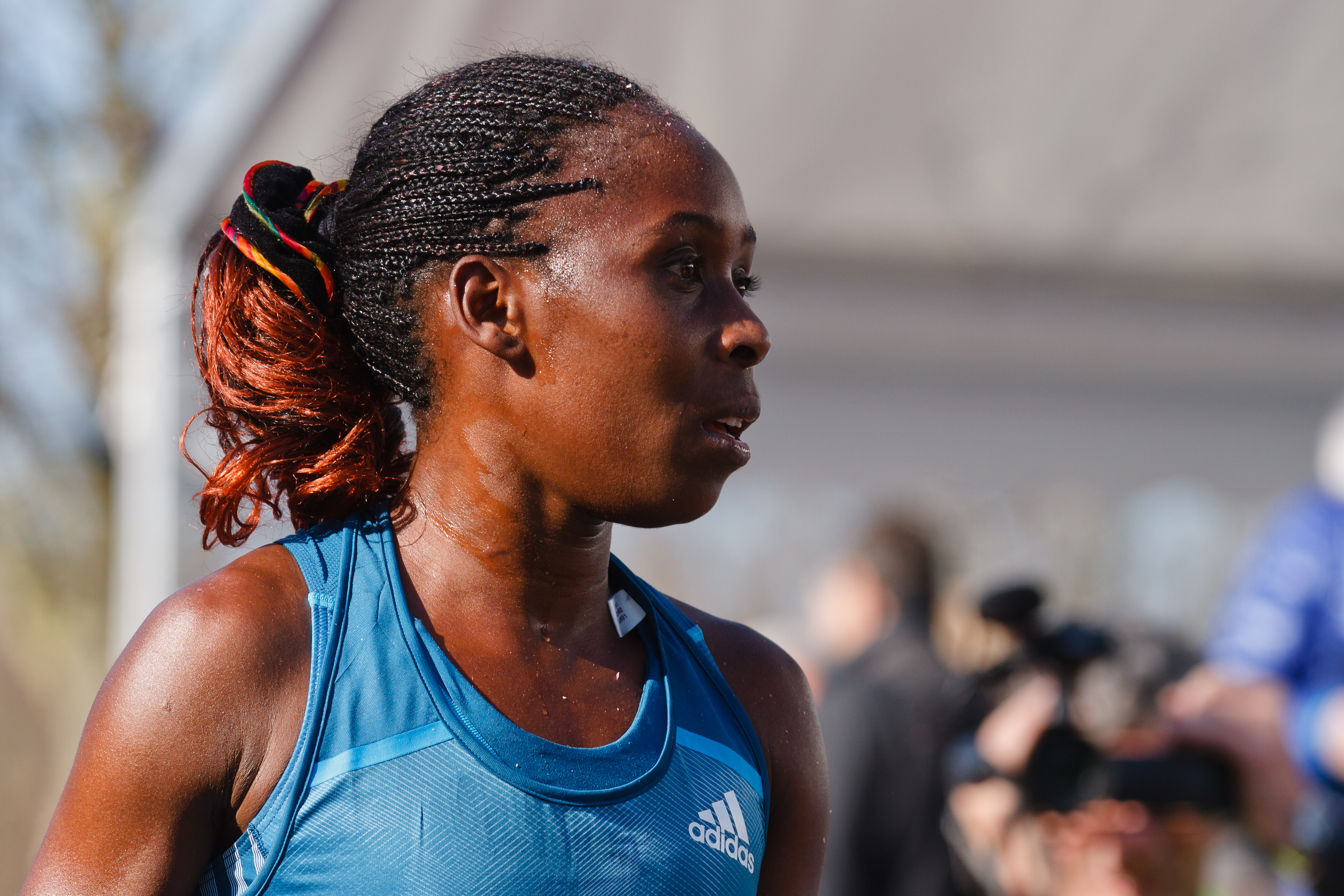
- Sarah Chepchirchir, 3rd Paris Half Marathon 2014

Personal information
- Born: 27 July 1984 (age 41)

Sport
- Country: Kenya
- Event(s): 10,000 metres, Marathon, half marathon

Sarah Chepchirchir (born 27 July 1984 in Nandi County) is a Kenyan long-distance runner who competes in road running competitions in distances ranging from 10K runs to the half marathon.

Chepchirchir had been banned twice in her career for doping violations. Her first ban was for four years from 2019 to 2023 and the second ban is for eight years from 2023 to 2031.

== Career ==
She started her professional career by running in races in France. In 2008, she had top three finishes in the Saint-Pol, Auray-Vannes and Le Lion Half Marathons. She made her impact on the scene in 2009, winning the Maroilles 20K and Auray-Vannes Half Marathon. A runner-up finish at the Course Paris-Versailles, a third place at the 20 Kilomètres de Paris, then a personal best of 71:54 minutes at the Reims à Toutes Jambes half marathon cemented her place among the country's top road runners.

In the 2010 season she was in the top three at the Corrida de Langueux, Maroilles 20K and Lille Half Marathon – at the latter she ran a personal best time of 69:27 minutes. This helped her earn her first international selection: at the 2010 IAAF World Half Marathon Championships she placed eleventh. She topped the podium at the Auray-Vannes and Boulogne-Billancourt Half Marathons that year.

Chepchirchir was in the top two of all her French road races in 2011, including victories at the Le Puy-en-Velay 15K and the Humarathon (where she ran a course record and personal best of 68:07 minutes). In her second international outing for Kenya she placed fifth at the 2011 All-Africa Games half marathon. In 2012, she ran two sub-70-minute half marathons but this was only enough for third in Paris and fifth in Lille. She claimed the course record at the 2013 Paris 20K with a run of 1:05:03 hours, and also won the Ndakaini Marathon in Kenya.

== Doping bans ==
Chepchirchir received a four-year ban in 2019 for abnormalities in her athlete blood passport. That ban ended on 5 February 2023. On 22 December 2023 she was provisionally suspended following an adverse analytical finding for testosterone in a sample collected at a marathon in Thailand on 8 November 2023. On 13 February 2024 the Athletics Integrity Unit announced that Chepchirchir had been found guilty of doping with testosterone, and banned from athletics for eight years to run from 22 December 2023 until 21 December 2031.

== Personal bests ==
- 10K run – 31:25 minutes (2012)
- 20 kilometres – 1:05:01 hours (2013)
- Half marathon – 1:08:07 hours (2011)
- Marathon – 2:19:47 hours (2017)
