= Kenneth Kipkemoi =

Kenyan long-distance runner

Medal record

Men's athletics

Representing Kenya

All-Africa Games
Silver medal – second place	2011 Maputo	Half marathon

African Championships
Gold medal – first place	2012 Porto-Novo	10,000 m

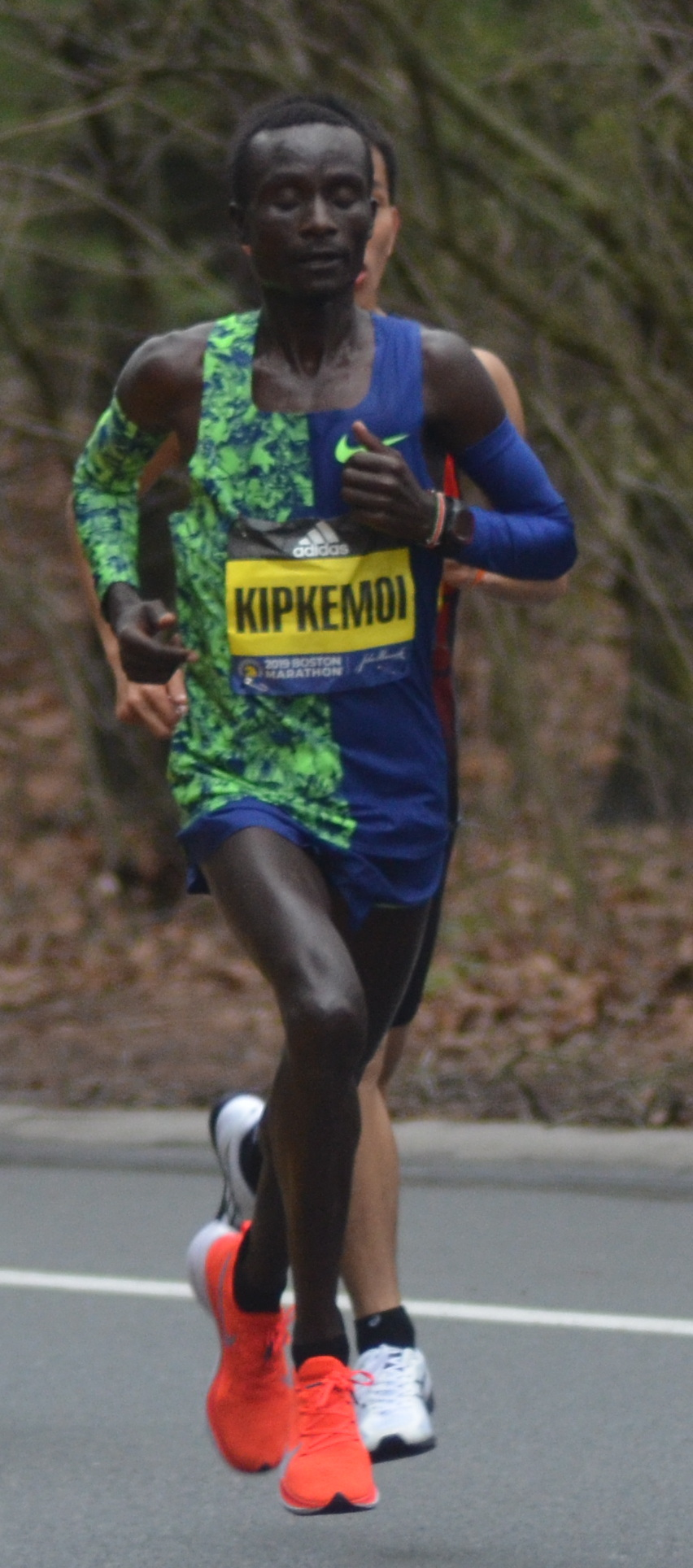
Near halfway point of 2019 Boston Marathon in which he placed 3rd

Kenneth Kiprop Kipkemoi (born 2 August 1984) (Note: Some sources list Kipkemoi's birth date as 1994 (listing his half marathon time of 59:11 minutes as a world junior record), although Kipkemoi has stated his year of birth as 1984.) is a Kenyan long-distance runner who competes in the 10,000 metres, the half marathon, and the marathon. He was the 2012 African champion in the 10,000 m, has a half marathon best of 59:11 minutes, and was the winner of the 2018 Rotterdam Marathon with a time of 2:05:44. He also won Eindhoven Marathon in 2023 with a personal best of 2:04:52.

== Career ==
Kipkemoi first began competing at road events in Kenya and ran a time of 62:59 minutes at the 2009 Nairobi Half Marathon. He was chosen for the Kenyan team at the 2011 All-Africa Games and was the silver medallist in the half marathon behind Lelisa Desisa, as well as fourth in the 10,000 m. That October, he came second at the Valencia Half Marathon, improving his personal best to 59:47 minutes.

He ran two half marathons in March 2012: he came in third at the CPC Loop with a best of 59:11 minutes but was less successful in Prague, coming in sixth. In June, he won the 10,000 m at both the national championships and the Kenyan Prison Championships; the latter performance guaranteed him conscription after his athletic duties. His first major victory followed at the 2012 African Championships in Athletics, where he led a Kenyan medal sweep with a championship record time of 27:19.74 minutes. He ran two track bests after the event, having third-place finishes at the FBK Games 5000 m (13:03.37 minutes) and the Memorial Van Damme 10,000 m (26:52.65 minutes). He ran another sub-hour half marathon in Valencia in October, timing 59:46 minutes.

At the start of 2013, he attempted to gain selection for the 2013 IAAF World Cross Country Championships, but was twelfth in the Kenyan trials. Turning back to the roads, he came third at the World's Best 10K, then fourth at the Berlin Half Marathon. A third-place finish at the Kenyan 10,000 m trials earned him a place at the 2013 World Championships in Athletics, where he managed seventh position overall. After that, he was runner-up at the Valencia Half Marathon.

In 2013, Kipkemoi ran his first marathon in Gaborone, Botswana in 2:17:41. In 2015 in Gongju, South Korea, he recorded a time of 2:12:08. In 2017, he competed again in Gongju, this time finishing with 2:09:43. At his European marathon debut on April 8, 2018, he won the Rotterdam Marathon with a time of 2:05:44. In Rotterdam, he started as an underdog, but he beat the competition with a phenomenal last two kilometers.
