= Augustine Kiprono Choge =

Kenyan runner (born 1987)

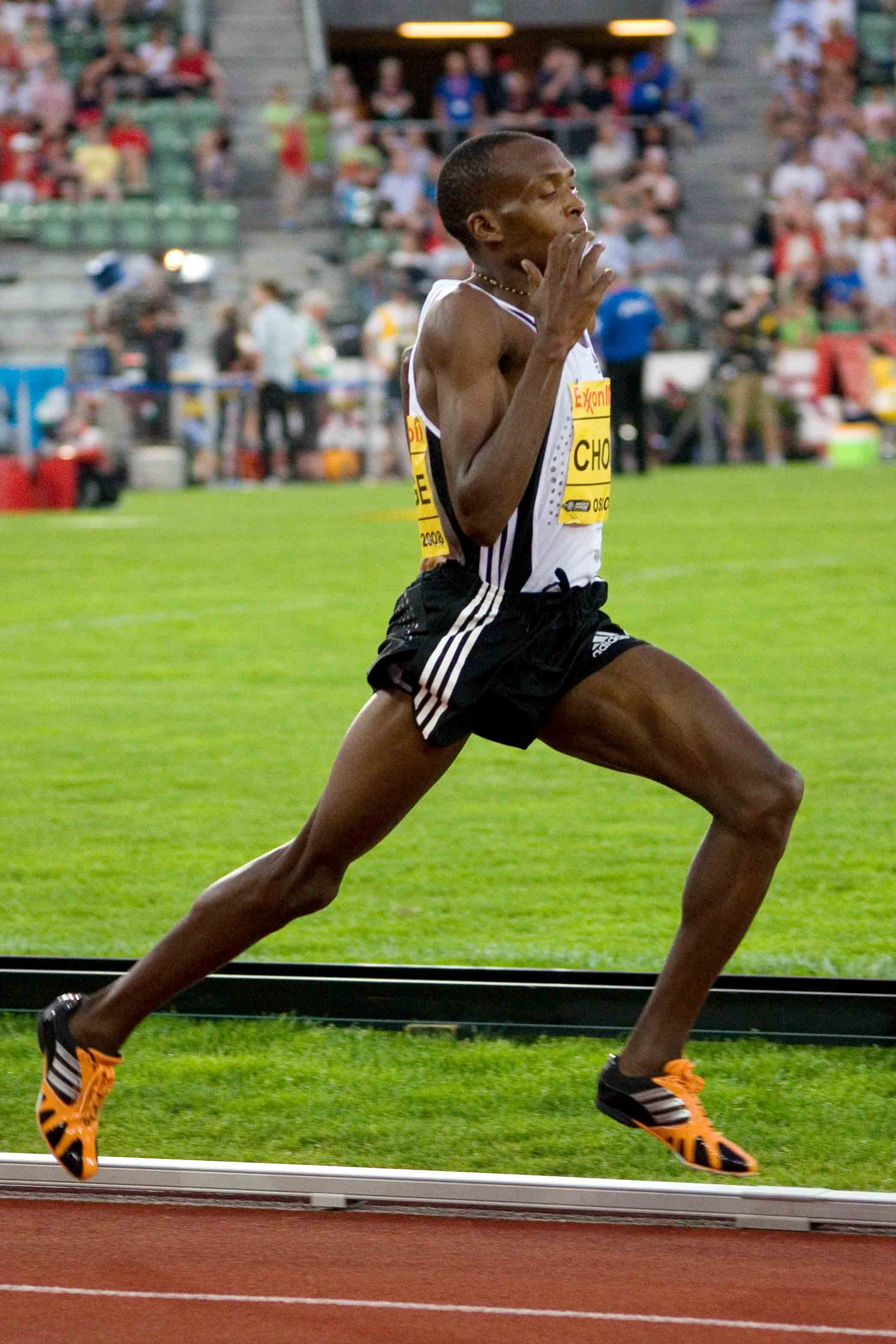
- Augustine Choge

Medal record

Men's athletics

Representing Kenya

World Indoor Championships
Silver medal – second place	2012 Istanbul	3000 m
Bronze medal – third place	2016 Portland	3000 m

World Indoor Tour
Winner	2016	3000 m

World Junior Championships
Gold medal – first place	2004 Grosseto	5000 m

World Youth Championships
Gold medal – first place	2003 Sherbrooke	3000 m

Commonwealth Games
Gold medal – first place	2006 Melbourne	5000 m

World Cross Country Championships
Gold medal – first place	2005 Saint-Galmier	Junior race

Augustine Kiprono Choge (born 21 January 1987) is a Kenyan middle distance and long distance runner.

He won world youth and junior titles on the track in 2003 and 2004, eventually going on to set a world junior record for the 3000 metres in 2005. In his final year as a junior he won the World Cross Country Junior title.

He claimed the 5000 metres gold medal at the 2006 Commonwealth Games, but began to focus more on the 1500 metres from then on. He reached the 1500 m finals at the 2008 Summer Olympics and the 2009 World Championships in Athletics. Choge broke the long-standing 4×1500 metres relay world record with a Kenyan team of runners in September 2009.

== Career ==
Choge was born in 1987 to a family of small-scale farmers at Kipsigak, near Kapsabet in Nandi District of the Rift Valley Province, Kenya.

He won the national secondary schools 10,000 metres race in 2002. At the 2003 IAAF World Cross Country Championships he finished fourth in the Junior race and won a gold medal as part of the junior team. He competed at the 2003 East African Youth Championships in May in Addis Ababa and won three gold medals, in 800, 1500 and 3000 metres. At the 2003 World Youth Championships in Athletics he won the 3000 metres race. He holds the 3000 metres world junior record set in May 2005 in Doha, the previous record (7:30.67) was held by Kenenisa Bekele, set in 2001.

Choge graduated from Kabikwen Secondary School in 2004. At the 2004 World Junior Championships in Athletics he won the 5000 metres race. At the 2004 IAAF World Athletics Final he was third in 5000 metres. At the 2005 IAAF World Cross Country Championships he won the junior race and junior team race. At the 2005 IAAF World Athletics Final he finished third in 3000 metres.

On 20 March 2006, he won the men's 5000 metres event at the 2006 Commonwealth Games with a time of 12 minutes, 56.41 seconds. This is the current Commonwealth Games record.

Augustine Choge competed at the 2008 Beijing Olympics and finished tenth in the 1500 m final. He came fifth over 1500 m on his debut at the 2009 World Championships in Athletics in August. In 2009 he was part of the Kenyan team that set a new the 4 x 1500 metres relay world record, 14:36.23 minutes. Other members of the team were William Biwott Tanui, Gideon Gathimba and Geoffrey Rono. The previous record in this rarely competed event was set by West Germany in 1977, making it the oldest world record when it was broken.

He ran the fastest qualifying time in the 3000 m at the 2010 IAAF World Indoor Championships, but failed to repeat his form in the final and finished in eleventh place. He took his first win of the 2010 IAAF Diamond League in the 1500 m at the Shanghai Golden Grand Prix and ended the year as second in the Diamond rankings behind Asbel Kiprop. The start of the 2011 season saw him move up to the fourth fastest runner of all-time over the 3000 m indoors, running a time of 7:28.00 minutes while event winner Yenew Alamirew became the world's third fastest man.

In October 2019, Choge joined the pacemaker team for the Ineos 1:59 Challenge to help fellow Kenyan athlete Eliud Kipchoge run a sub-two hour marathon distance.

Choge is managed by James Templeton and coached by Colm O'Connell.

== Achievements ==
Year	Competition	Venue	Position	Event	Notes
Representing Kenya
2003	World Cross Country Championships	Lausanne, Switzerland	4th	Junior race (7.92 km)	22:55
2003	World Youth Championships	Sherbrooke, Canada	1st	3000 m	7:52.53
2004	World Junior Championships	Grosseto, Italy	1st	5000 m	13:28.93
2004	World Athletics Final	Monte Carlo, Monaco	3rd	5000 m	13:09.00
2005	World Cross Country Championships	St Etienne, France	1st	Junior race (8 km)	23:59
2005	World Athletics Final	Monte Carlo, Monaco	3rd	3000 m	7:39.99
2006	World Cross Country Championships	Fukuoka, Japan	7th	Short race (4 km)	11:03
2006	World Cross Country Championships	Fukuoka, Japan	1st	Team	21 pts
2006	Commonwealth Games	Melbourne, Australia	1st	5000 m	12:56.41
2006	World Athletics Final	Stuttgart, Germany	3rd	1500 m	3:33.37
2008	World Cross Country Championships	Edinburgh, Scotland	12th	Long race (12 km)	35:26
2008	Olympic Games	Beijing, China	9th	1500 m	3:35.50
2009	World Championships	Berlin, Germany	5th	1500 m	3:36.53
2009	World Athletics Final	Thessaloniki, Greece	3rd	1500 m	3:35.46
2010	World Indoor Championships	Doha, Qatar	11th	3000 m	7:53.42
2012	World Indoor Championships	Istanbul, Turkey	2nd	3000 m	7:41.77

== Personal bests ==
Event	Time	Venue	Date
800 metres	1:44.86	Ostrava, Czech Republic	17 June 2009
1000 metres (indoor)	2:17.79	Prague, Czech Republic	26 February 2009
1500 metres	3:29.47	Berlin, Germany	14 June 2009
1500 metres (indoor)	3:33.23	Birmingham, England	19 February 2011
2000 metres (indoor)	4:56.30	Aubière, France	9 February 2007
One mile	3:50.01	London, England	27 July 2013
3000 metres	7:28.76	Doha, Qatar	6 May 2011
3000 metres (indoor)	7:28.00	Stuttgart, Germany	5 February 2011
5000 metres	12:53.66	Rome, Italy	8 July 2005
10,000 metres	28:22.8	Nairobi, Kenya	22 April 2016
Half marathon	59:26	Ras Al Khaimah, UAE	10 February 2017
Marathon	2:20:53	New York City, USA	7 November 2021

- All information taken from World Athletics profile.
