= Takhir Mamashayev =

Kazakhstani marathon runner

Personal information
- Nationality: Kazakhstan
- Born: 24 September 1979 (age 46) Zhambyl, Kazakh SSR, Soviet Union
- Height: 1.76 m (5 ft 9 1/2 in)
- Weight: 65 kg (143 lb)

Sport
- Sport: Athletics
- Event: Marathon

Achievements and titles
- Personal bests: Half-marathon: 1:05:28 (2002); Marathon: 2:15:20 (2003)

Takhir Mamashayev (Kazakh: Тахир Мамашаев; born September 24, 1979, in Zhambyl) is a Kazakhstani marathon runner. He set a personal best time of 2:15:20 at the 2003 Berlin Marathon.

Mamashayev represented Kazakhstan at the 2008 Summer Olympics in Beijing, where he competed for the men's marathon. He successfully finished the race in seventieth place by nineteen seconds behind Israel's Seteng Ayele, with a time of 2:30:26.
