= Joseph Kitur Kiplimo =

Kenyan long-distance runner (born 1988)

Joseph Kitur Kiplimo (born 20 July 1988) is a Kenyan long-distance runner who specializes in the 5000 metres.

He finished fourth at the 2009 World Athletics Final.

His personal best times are 7:31.20 minutes in the 3000 metres, achieved in September 2009 in Rieti; and 13:09.34 minutes in the 5000 metres, achieved in May 2009 in Rabat.
