= Abraham Niyonkuru =

Burundian marathon runner

Personal information
- Nationality: Burundian
- Born: 26 December 1989 (age 36)
- Height: 1.62 m (5 ft 4 in) (2016)
- Weight: 52 kg (115 lb) (2016)

Sport
- Sport: Track and field
- Events: Marathon; 10,000 metres Cross country

Achievements and titles
- Personal bests: Marathon: 2:16:33; 10,000 metres: 28:38.58
Medal record
Athletics
Representing Burundi
Auray-Vannes Half Marathon
Gold medal – first place	2015	Men's race
World Military Track and Field Championships
Silver medal – second place	2009 Sofia	10,000 metres
- Updated on 26 October 2016

Abraham Niyonkuru (born 26 December 1989) is a Burundian track and field athlete who specialises in the marathon, the 10,000 metres and cross country running. Niyonkuru competed in the 2016 Summer Olympics in Rio de Janeiro, Brazil. At the Olympics, he competed in the marathon. Niyonkuru has also competed in a World Junior Championships, two World Cross Country Championships, a Jeux de la Francophonie, a World Military Track and Field Championships and an Auray-Vannes Half Marathon.

== Competition ==
Niyonkuru's debut at an international competition was at the 2005 IAAF World Cross Country Championships. He competed in the junior men's race and finished 33rd out of 133 athletes (Note: Six athletes; Lahcen Bouharroud, Said El Medouly, Nuno Costa, Ruann Etchechury, El Hadj Ribouh and Molefe Molefe; did not finish the race.) in a time of 25 minutes and 32 seconds. At the 2005 Jeux de la Francophonie Niyonkuru competed in the 10,000 metres. Niyonkuru finished fourth in a time of 29 minutes and 18.08 seconds, only 0.03 seconds behind the silver medalist, Moroccan Abderrahim Goumri. Niyonkuru then competed in the 2006 World Junior Championships. He finished fifth in the 10,000 metres in a time of 28 minutes and 59.92 seconds. He was 6.63 seconds behind the race winner, Ibrahim Jeilan of Ethiopia. In 2007, Niyonkuru competed at the 2007 World Cross Country Championships in the junior men's race. He finished 13th in 24 minutes and 56 seconds. He finished 49 seconds behind the gold-medalist, Kenyan Asbel Kiprop. At the 2009 World Military Track and Field Championships, Niyonkuru won the silver medal in the 10,000 metres. His time of 29 minutes and 37.14 seconds was 23.67 seconds behind the gold medalist, Essa Ismail Rashed of Qatar. Niyonkuru was 4.97 seconds ahead of the bronze medalist, Tunisian El Akhdar Hachani. Niyonkuru won the 2015 Auray-Vannes Half Marathon in a time of one hour, three minutes and twenty seconds. At the 2016 Summer Olympics, Niyonkuru competed in the men's marathon on 21 August 2016, but did not finish the race. In 2017 he competed in the men's marathon at the 2017 World Championships in Athletics, placing 71st in 2:42:27.
