= Annemarie Jutel =

New Zealand medical sociologist

- Born: 1958

Academic background
- Education: University of Otago
- Thesis: Visions of vice: appearance and policy in feminine self-scrutiny (2000)

Annemarie Goldstein Jutel (born 1958) is a New Zealand academic, graphic novelist, and is a full professor at Victoria University of Wellington, specialising in the sociology of medical diagnosis.

== Academic career ==
Jutel was born in 1958. She trained as a nurse at the Ecole d'infirmieres in Nantes, and then worked in France, the US and New Zealand in medical oncology, pediatric intensive care nurse, NICU and as a first responder. She then transferred from clinical practice into academia, completing a PhD titled Visions of vice: appearance and policy in feminine self-scrutiny at the University of Otago in 2000. Jutel then joined the faculty of the Victoria University of Wellington, rising to full professor in 2016.

Jutel researches the sociology of medical diagnosis. She has examined how social and cultural aspects affect the experience of health, illness, and disease. She is also interested in how diagnoses are represented in literature and popular culture. Jutel has published on how using diagnostic frameworks outside of medical settings, for instance seeking a medical reason for the behaviour of a children's book character or a politician, can shut down other possible explanations. Jutel regards a diagnosis as not just a disease label but a social phenomenon, and has written about the hierarchy of diagnoses, the medicalisation of daily life, self-diagnosis, and stillbirth.

She has published three books, Putting a Name to It: Diagnosis in Contemporary Society, published by Johns Hopkins University Press in 2011; Diagnosis: Truths and Tales, published by University of Toronto Press in 2019; and The Sociology of Diagnosis: A Brief Guide with Edward Elgar in 2024. She also co-edited with Kevin Dew the 2014 book by Johns Hopkins University Press, Social Issues in Diagnosis: An Introduction for Students and Clinicians. as well as special issues of Social Science and Medicine, Perspectives on Biology and Medicine and The Sociology of Health and Illness.

A former elite long-distance runner, she has also published books on running: La course à pied au féminin; Pratique de la La course à pied, and The New Zealand Woman's Guide to Running: Beginner to Elite. She also wrote the graphic novel, The Tear Bottle: A Graphic Story of Love and Things.

== Selected works ==
- Jutel, Annemarie (2009). "Sociology of diagnosis: a preliminary review". Sociology of Health and Illness. 31 (2): 278–299. doi:10.1111/j.1467-9566.2008.01152.x. PMID 19220801. Wikidata Q37394377.
- Annemarie Goldstein Jutel, (2024) Putting a name to it: Diagnosis in Contemporary Society, Johns Hopkins University Press. https://www.press.jhu.edu/books/title/12944/putting-name-it?srsltid=AfmBOoo2KTJLjJJ3v-672Kss8YqFvZn_P4XTIO6kvNN0NjvVU_skCCtK
- Annemarie Goldstein Jutel. (2024). The Sociology of Diagnosis: A Brief Guide. Edward Elgar Publishing. https://www.elgaronline.com/monobook/book/9781035331673/9781035331673.xml
- Jutel, A. G. (2019). Diagnosis: Truths and tales. University of Toronto Press.https://utorontopress.com/9781487516468/diagnosis/?srsltid=AfmBOorljwzSseOMdSi8P2mhQK22SGqzDAvud_RUaaNDK59dlq7hrZKA
- Jutel, A. (2023). Between the Spaces: graphic diagnosis. Perspectives in Biology and Medicine, 66(2), 299-311.
- Jutel, A. (2019). ‘The expertness of his healer’: Diagnosis, disclosure and the power of a profession. Health, 23(3), 289-305.
- Jutel, Annemarie; Nettleton, Sarah (2011). "Towards a sociology of diagnosis: reflections and opportunities". Social Science & Medicine. 73 (6): 793–800. doi:10.1016/j.socscimed.2011.07.014. PMID 21868144. Wikidata Q48605146.
- Lupton, Deborah Anne; Jutel, Annemarie (2015). "'It's like having a physician in your pocket!' A critical analysis of self-diagnosis smartphone apps". Social Science & Medicine. 133: 128–135. doi:10.1016/j.socscimed.2015.04.004. PMID 25864149. Wikidata Q33443224.
- Jutel, Annemarie (2005). "Weighing Health: The Moral Burden of Obesity". Social Semiotics. 15 (2): 113–125. doi:10.1080/10350330500154717. Wikidata Q61828487.
- Jutel, Annemarie (2010). "Medically unexplained symptoms and the disease label". Social Theory and Health. 8 (3): 229–245. doi:10.1057/sth.2009.21. Wikidata Q61828463.
