= Ahmed Baday =

Moroccan long-distance runner (born 1974)

Medal record

Men's athletics

Representing Morocco

Mediterranean Games
Gold medal – first place	2009 Pescara	Half marathon
Bronze medal – third place	2001 Radès	10,000 m

Jeux de la Francophonie
Gold medal – first place	2005 Niamey	10,000 m
Bronze medal – third place	2001 Ottawa	10,000 m

Ahmed Ibrahim Baday (born 15 June 1974) is a Moroccan long-distance runner who specialized in the 5000 metres and cross-country running but now competes in road running competitions. He is currently banned for doping.

A main stay of the Moroccan team at the IAAF World Cross Country Championships, he helped his nation to medals in the team race in 1999, 2003 and 2007. In track running, he was the 10,000 metres gold medallist at the 2001 Jeux de la Francophonie and also won bronze at the 2001 Mediterranean Games. He competed for Morocco at the 2007 World Championships in Athletics.

He began running in road competitions in 2008 and his highlights include a half marathon gold medal at the 2009 Mediterranean Games and a win at the Beppu-Ōita Marathon.

== Career ==
He won his first international medal at the 1998 World Junior Championships in Athletics, where he came third in the 5000 m. He was however later disqualified when it was proved that he had been 24 years old when he competed at that Junior Championships. The upper age limit for IAAF Junior World Championships is 19 years. At the 1999 IAAF World Cross Country Championships he was fifteenth in the men's short race, helping Morocco to the team silver medal. He won the 10,000 metres gold medal at the 2001 Jeux de la Francophonie and then a bronze medal in the event at the 2001 Mediterranean Games. He did not compete at any major competitions in 2002 and upon his international return he was fifteenth again in the short race at the 2003 IAAF World Cross Country Championships, this time taking the team bronze.

He represented Morocco in the world cross country long race from 2004 to 2010, typically finishing in the top thirty, and his best performance came at the 2007 edition, where he came seventeenth and won the team silver medal alongside Anis Selmouni. On the track he came fifth over 5000 m at the 2004 African Championships in Athletics, but managed only seventh place at the 2006 competition. At the 2005 Jeux de la Francophonie he did not retain his 10,000 m but still managed to win the bronze medal. He ran for Morocco at the 2007 World Championships in Athletics, but was eliminated in the first round. He was chosen as a 5000 m back-up for Morocco at the 2008 Summer Olympics, but did not participate.

Baday began to focus on road events and made his marathon debut in May 2008, finishing ninth at the Hamburg Marathon with a time of 2:10:59. In his second outing over the distance, he took third at the National Capital Marathon in Ottawa. He represented Morocco in the half marathon at the 2009 Mediterranean Games and defeated José Manuel Martinez to become the Mediterranean champion. After recording a personal best of 1:01:03 for second at the Rabat Half Marathon, he ran at the 2009 IAAF World Half Marathon Championships but was less successful as he finished in 49th place. In February 2010 he came third at the Marrakesh Marathon and improved his personal best time by one second. His season's best time came at the Yangzhou Jianzhen International Half Marathon, which he won in a course record time. He ran in the Bogota Half Marathon in August and took third place with a time of 1:04:47.

He began 2011 with a win at the Beppu-Ōita Marathon, his first victory over the distance, beating Daniel Njenga in a personal best of 2:10:14. He finished in sixth at the Rabat Half and went on to represent his country in the marathon at the 2011 World Championships in Athletics, taking 27th place in Daegu. He again started a year with a personal best, this time running 27:56 to win the Taroudant 10K in March, then 2:09:16 hours at the Daegu Marathon in April 2012.

== Doping ban ==
IAAF announced 6 March 2015 that Baday had been suspended for two years for a biological passport anti-doping rule violation, ending 30 December 2016. His results from 26 March 2010 and onwards were annulled.

== International competitions ==
Year	Competition	Venue	Position	Event	Notes
Representing Morocco
1998	World Junior Championships	Annecy, France	DQ (3rd)	5000 m	IAAF rule 141 (no junior)
1999	World Cross Country Championships	Belfast, United Kingdom	15th	Short race (4.236 km)	12:58
1999	World Cross Country Championships	Belfast, United Kingdom	2nd	Team	45 pts
2001	Mediterranean Games	Radès, Tunisia	3rd	10,000 m	29:13.36
2003	World Cross Country Championships	Lausanne, Switzerland	15th	Short race (4.03 km)	11:34
2003	World Cross Country Championships	Lausanne, Switzerland	3rd	Team	44 pts
2004	African Championships	Brazzaville, Republic of the Congo	5th	5000 m	13:51.01
2006	African Championships	Bambous, Mauritius	7th	5000 m	14:09.60
2009	Mediterranean Games	Pescara, Italy	1st	Half marathon	1:04:06
2010	World Cross Country Championships	Bydgoszcz, Poland	DQ (28th)	Senior race	Doping
2010	World Cross Country Championships	Bydgoszcz, Poland	DQ (5th)	Senior team	Doping
2011	World Championships	Daegu, South Korea	DQ (27th)	Marathon	Doping
2013	Mediterranean Games	Mersin, Turkey	DQ (1st)	Half marathon	Doping

== Personal bests ==
- 3000 metres – 7:42.55 (2006)
- 5000 metres – 13:09.46 (2006)
- 10,000 metres – 27:48.85 (2005)
