= Isaac Kiprono Songok =

Kenyan long-distance runner

Medal record

Men's athletics

Representing Kenya

African Championships
Silver medal – second place	2008 Addis Ababa	5000 m

Isaac Kiprono Songok (born 25 April 1984 in Kaptel, Nandi District) is a Kenyan long-distance runner.

He went St. Patrick's High School in Iten, famous for producing runners.

In 2001 he set a new 2000 m World Junior Record (4:56.86) in Berlin and became World Youth Champion at 1500 metres.

He is best known for winning the silver medal in the short race at the 2006 World Cross Country Championships.

He is managed by James Templeton and coached by Colm O'Connell. Songok is from Kaptel village, as is Bernard Lagat, another famous athlete.

== Achievements ==
Year	Competition	Venue	Position	Event	Notes
Representing Kenya
2001	World Youth Championships	Debrecen, Hungary	1st	1500 m	3:36.78
2002	World Junior Championships	Kingston, Jamaica	7th	1500 m	3:44.93
2003	World Championships	Paris, France	9th	1500 m	3:34.39
2004	World Cross Country Championships	Brussels, Belgium	7th	Short race (4 km)	11:45
2004	World Cross Country Championships	Brussels, Belgium	3rd	Team competition	52 pts
2004	Olympic Games	Athens, Greece	12th	1500 m	3:41.72
2004	World Athletics Final	Monte Carlo, Monaco	11th	1500 m	3:48.32
2005	World Cross Country Championships	Saint-Étienne- Saint-Galmier, France	3rd	Short race (4.196 km)	11:39
2005	World Cross Country Championships	Saint-Étienne- Saint-Galmier, France	2nd	Team competition	21 pts
2005	World Championships	Helsinki, Finland	10th	5000 m	13:37.10
2005	World Athletics Final	Monte Carlo, Monaco	3rd	5000 m	13:40.24
2006	World Cross Country Championships	Fukuoka, Japan	2nd	Short race (4 km)	10:55
2006	World Cross Country Championships	Fukuoka, Japan	1st	Team competition	21 pts
2006	World Athletics Final	Stuttgart, Germany	3rd	3000 m	7:39.50
2007	World Championships	Osaka, Japan	18th (h)	5000 m	13:47.42
2008	African Championships	Addis Ababa, Ethiopia	2nd	5000 m	13:49.91

=== Personal bests ===
- 1500 metres - 3:30.99 min (2004)
- Mile - 3:54.56 min (2001)
- 3000 metres - 7:28.72 min (2006)
- 5000 metres - 12:48.66 min (2006)

Sporting positions
Preceded by (Kenya) Eliud Kipchoge	Men's 3,000 m Best Year Performance; 2006	Succeeded by (Ethiopia) Kenenisa Bekele
