= Bekana Daba =

Ethiopian long-distance runner

Olympic medal record

Representing Ethiopia

Men's athletics

All-Africa Games
Bronze medal – third place	2011 Maputo	Half marathon

Bekana Daba (born 29 July 1988 in Welega, Oromia Region) is an Ethiopian long-distance runner who specialises in the 5000 metres and marathon distances.

== Biography ==
He was selected to compete at the 2007 World Championships in Athletics but he finished eleventh in his heat and did not make the final. He won the Carlsbad 5000 in his first ever 5 km road race, beating Abreham Cherkos in a time of 13:19. At the 2009 World Championships in Athletics, he finished sixth in his 5000 m heat, however he just didn't make the final, losing out to Chakir Boujattaoui. Running at the Rock ‘n’ Roll Las Vegas Half Marathon, he set a Nevada state record of 1:01:40 on the way to victory.

He ran in the 2010 New York City Half Marathon and set a personal best of 1:01:23 for fourth place. He began to work towards a step up to the marathon distance at the end of the year and won at the inaugural Ethiopian Clubs Cross Country Championships as part of his preparations, defeating marathon runner Feyisa Lilesa. He ran at the 2010 Amsterdam Marathon and finished in twelfth with a time of 2:14:40.

He was much more successful on his second attempt at the distance as he broke the course record to win the Houston Marathon in January 2011, running a Texas state record of 2:07:04 hours to finish four minutes ahead of the competition. The mark was achieved in spite of the rainy conditions and his lead was so significant that in the final stages of the race he decided to stop at a nearby portable toilet for a bathroom break. At the 2011 Chicago Marathon he ran a time of 2:07:59 hours for fourth place behind a Kenyan trio. In his first race of 2012, he failed to finish at the Lake Biwa Marathon.
