= Moses Ndiema Kipsiro =

Ugandan long-distance runner

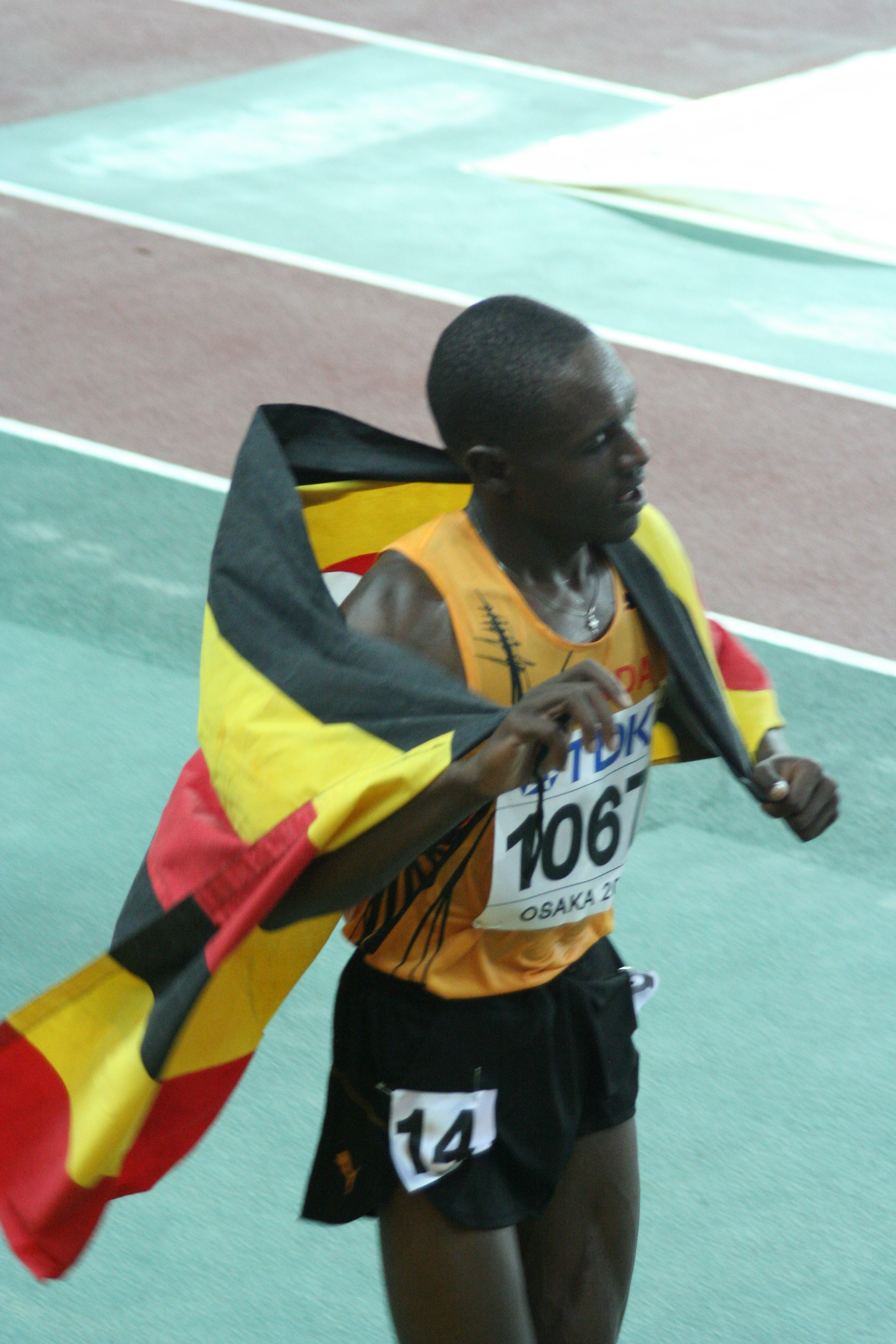

Personal information
- Nationality: Ugandan
- Born: 2 September 1986 (age 40)

Sport
- Country: Uganda
- Sport: Track & Field, Cross Country
- Events: 3000 m, 5000 m and 10000 m

Achievements and titles
- Personal bests: 1500 m: 3:37.60 (2008); 3000 m: 7:30.95 (2009); 5000 m: 12:50.72 (2007); 10000 m: 27:04.48 (2012)
Medal record
Men's athletics
Representing Uganda
World Championships
Bronze medal – third place	2007 Osaka	5000 m
World Cross Country Championships
Silver medal – second place	2009 Amman	Senior
All-Africa Games
Gold medal – first place	2007 Algiers	5000 m
Gold medal – first place	2011 Maputo	5000 m
African Championships
Gold medal – first place	2006 Bambous	10,000 m
Silver medal – second place	2010 Nairobi	10,000 m
Bronze medal – third place	2006 Bambous	5000 m
Commonwealth Games
Gold medal – first place	2010 Delhi	5000 m
Gold medal – first place	2010 Delhi	10000 m
Gold medal – first place	2014 Glasgow	10000 m
Continental Cup
Silver medal – second place	2010 Split	3000 m
Silver medal – second place	2010 Split	5000 m

Moses Ndiema Kipsiro (born 2 September 1986 in Singare) is a Ugandan long-distance runner who specialises in the 5000 metres. He was the bronze medallist in the event at the 2007 World Championships in Athletics. He represented Uganda at the 2008 Beijing Olympics, coming fourth over 5000 m.

Kipsiro has won medals in the 5000 m at the African Championships in Athletics and the All-Africa Games. He completed a 5000/10,000 metres double at the 2010 Commonwealth Games. He is a four-time Ugandan cross country champion having won every race from 2008 to 2011.

== Career ==
=== First African and world medals ===
He made his first senior international appearance at the 2005 World Championships in Athletics, running in the heats of the 5000 metres. At the 2006 Commonwealth Games in Melbourne, he came seventh in the 5000 m. Kipsiro placed in the top thirty of both the long and short races at the 2006 IAAF World Cross Country Championships. However, it was on the track that he made his first impact, taking the 5000 m silver medal and the 10,000 metres gold medal at the 2006 African Championships in Athletics.

The following year he focused on track running and secured the 5000 m title representing Uganda at the 2007 All-Africa Games. At the 2007 World Championships in Athletics a month later he crossed the line after Bernard Lagat and Eliud Kipchoge to gain himself a world bronze medal in the event. He was thirteenth at the 2008 IAAF World Cross Country Championships, but came close to a medal at the 2008 Beijing Olympics that summer with a fourth-place finish in the men's 5000 m final. He managed to reach the podium at the end of season 2008 IAAF World Athletics Final, taking the 5000 m silver.

He ran at the inaugural World 10K Bangalore race in 2008 and finished as the runner-up just behind Zersenay Tadese with a national record of 27:54 minutes. He had a second attempt at the race in 2010, but was again relegated to second place, this time by Titus Mbishei.

He came in second place in a closely fought race at the 2009 IAAF World Cross Country Championships, finishing with a time of 35:04 minutes. At the 2009 Super Grand Prix meeting Herculis, he set a Ugandan record in the 3000 m of 7:30.95 minutes.

=== Commonwealth gold medals ===
Kipsiro's 2010 season started with success at the 2010 IAAF World Cross Country Championships: he won the bronze medal in the men's race and led the Ugandan team to fifth place in the table. The next major test came in July on the track at the 2010 African Championships in Athletics, where he took the 10,000 metres silver medal behind Wilson Kiprop. Based on this performance, he was selected to represent Africa at the 2010 IAAF Continental Cup in both the 3000 metres and 5000 m. He was outdone by an in-form Bernard Lagat over both distances, but managed to secure two silver medals for Africa. He was selected to run in the 5000 m at the 2010 Commonwealth Games in New Delhi the following month and faced strong opposition from a Kenyan trio. However, Kipsiro assumed the lead and never relinquished the position, holding off defending champion Eliud Kipchoge at the line to become the Commonwealth champion. He followed this up with a second win of the Games in the 10,000 m, beating Daniel Salel to take the gold medal.

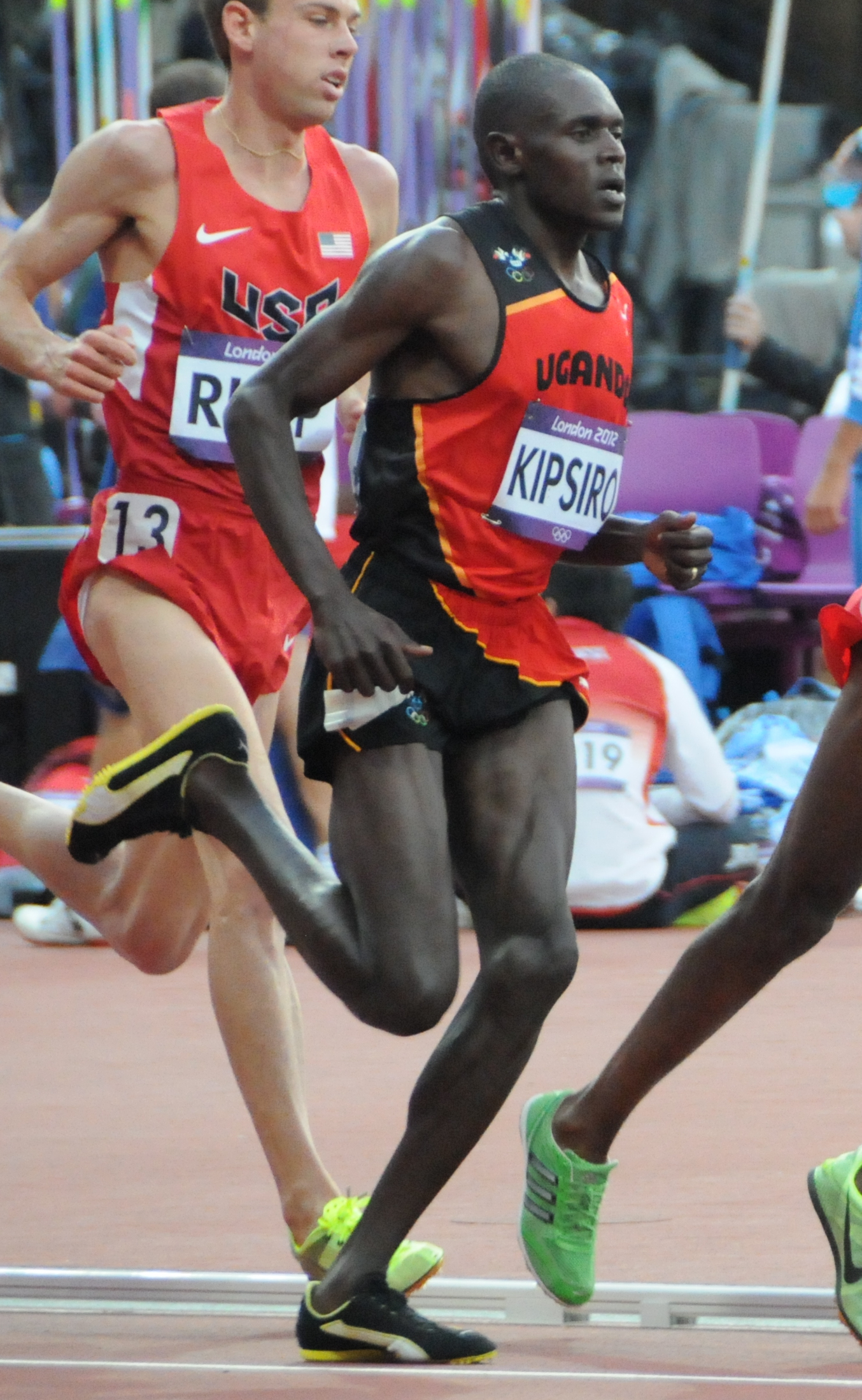
Kipsiro in the 5000 m at the 2012 Summer Olympics.

He won his fourth consecutive title at the Ugandan Cross Country Championships in February 2011, comfortably seeing off challenges from national rivals Stephen Kiprotich and Geofrey Kusuro. However, Kiprotich finished ahead of him at the 2011 IAAF World Cross Country Championships, where he was eleventh, and the Ugandans took the bronze team medal. His 2011 season was abruptly brought to a halt as he was diagnosed with malaria and typhoid. He missed the 2011 World Championships in Athletics as a result, but returned to defend his 5000 m title at the 2011 All-Africa Games and won for a second time running. He returned to grass competitions in 2012 with a third-place finish at the Cross de Itálica.

=== 2012 Olympic Games ===
Kipsiro set two national records at the Birmingham Indoor Grand Prix, covering 3000 m in 7:37.40 minutes before reaching two miles in a record of 8:08.16 minutes. Kipsiro managed seventh in the 3000 m final at the 2012 IAAF World Indoor Championships. On the 2012 IAAF Diamond League circuit he placed third in the Doha and London legs of the series, but at the 5000 m final at the 2012 London Olympics he came only 15th overall. He fared better in the 10,000 m Olympic final, taking tenth place. He ended the year with a win at the Silvesterlauf Trier.

At the 2013 IAAF World Cross Country Championships he just finished outside the medals with a fourth-place finish. He was runner-up at the UAE Healthy Kidney 10K in New York, then took two prominent scalps in Wilson Kipsang and Haile Gebrselassie to win at the Manchester 10K.

== Career highlights ==
Commonwealth Games
2006 – Melbourne, 7th at 5,000 m
2010 – Delhi, (gold) 1st at 5,000 m
2010 – Delhi, (gold) 1st at 10,000 m
2014 – Glasgow, (gold) 1st at 10,000 m
Olympic Games
2008 – Beijing, 4th at 5,000 m
IAAF World Championships in Athletics
2005 – Helsinki, 12th in heat 2 at 5,000 m
2007 – Osaka, (bronze) 3rd at 5,000 m
2009 – Berlin, 4th at 5,000m
IAAF World Cross Country Championships
2006 – Fukuoka, 29th in short race
2006 – Fukuoka, 23rd in long race
2009 – Amman, (silver) 2nd in long race
IAAF Golden League
2007 – Brussels, (bronze) 3rd at 5,000 m
2007 – Zürich, (bronze) 3rd at 3,000 m
2007 – Paris, (gold) 1st at 3,000 m
IAAF Grand Prix
2005 – Zagreb, (gold) 1st at 3,000 m
2007 – Monaco, (silver) 2nd at 3,000 m
African Championships
2006 – Bambous, (silver) 2nd at 5,000 m
2006 – Bambous, (gold) 1st at 10,000 m
2010 – Nairobi, (silver) 2nd at 10,000 m
All Africa Games
2007 – Algiers, (gold) 1st at 5,000 m
2011 – Maputo, (gold) 1st at 5,000 m
Other races
2005 – Cork, 2nd at Cork City Sports 3,000 m
2005 – Trier, 1st at New Year's Eve Race Trier
2006 – Trier, 1st at New Year's Eve Race Trier
2006 – Guyan-Mestras, 1st at Cross Sud Ouest
2006 – Fontenay Les Briis, 1st at RATP Cross Country
2006 – Cork, 2nd at Cork City Sports 3,000 m
2006 – Solihull, 1st at BMC Solihull 5,000 m
2006 – Brazzaville, 3rd at 3,000 m
2006 – Belfast, 2nd at Belfast International Cross Country
2007 – Trier, 1st at New Year's Eve Trier
2007 – Cork, 1st at Cork City Sports 3,000 m
2007 – Uganda, 2nd at Ugandan Cross Country Championships
2007 – Le Mans, 2nd at Cross Ouest France
2007 – Belfast, 1st at Belfast International Cross Country
2008 – Sevilla, 1st at Cross Internacional de Itálica
2008 – Belfast, 1st at Belfast International Cross Country

== Personal bests ==
Distance	Mark	Date	Location
1500 m	3:37.6	14 June 2008	Watford, United Kingdom
3000 m	7:30.95	28 July 2009	Monaco
5000 m	12:50.72	14 September 2007	Brussels, Belgium
10,000 m	27:04.48	22 June 2012	Birmingham, United Kingdom
