= 2013 New York City Marathon =

Footrace held in New York City

43rd New York City Marathon
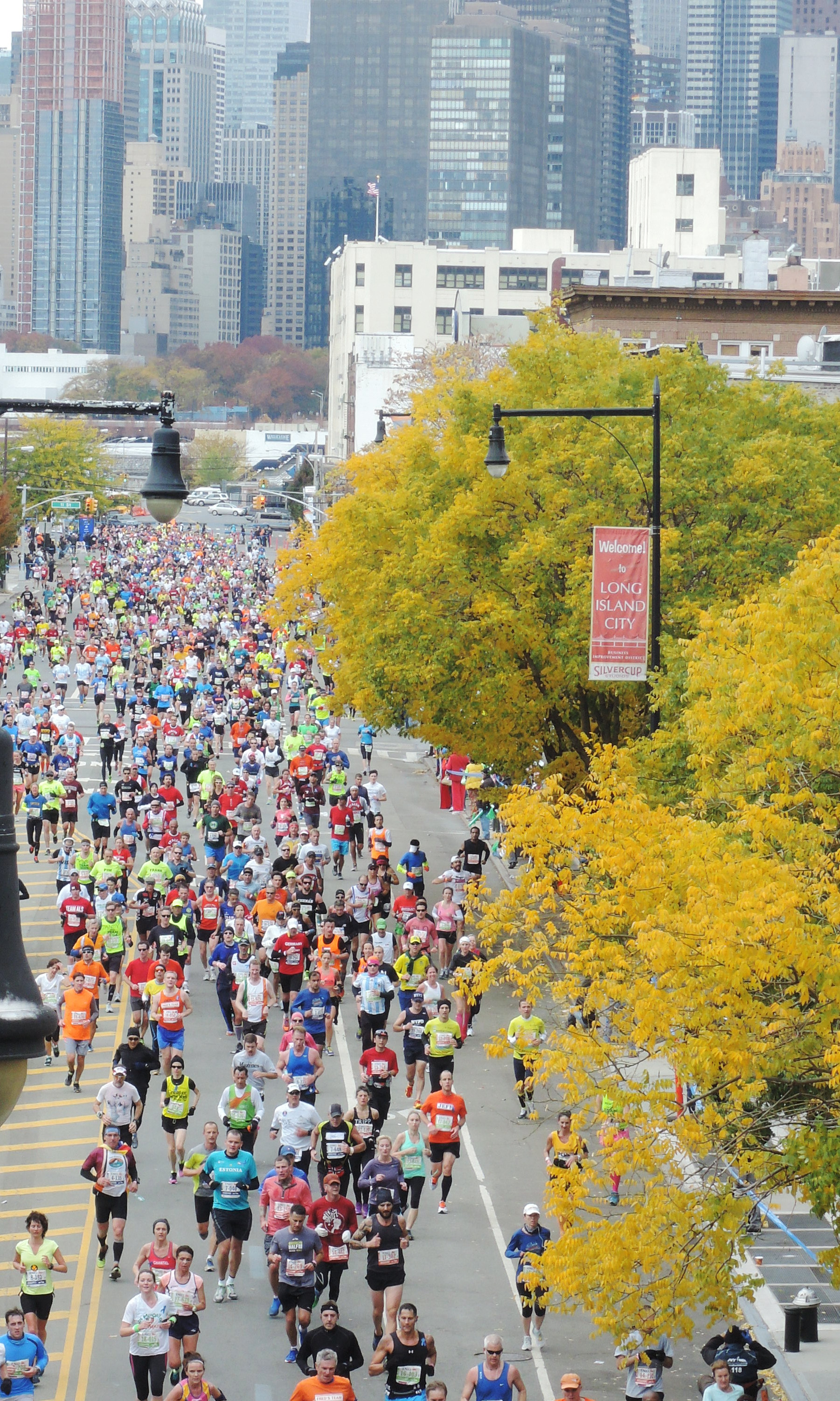
- 41st Drive, Long Island City
- Location: New York City, New York
- Date: November 3

Champions
- Men: Geoffrey Mutai (2:08:24)
- Women: Priscah Jeptoo (2:25:07)
- Wheelchair men: Marcel Hug (1:40:14)
- Wheelchair women: Tatyana McFadden (1:59:13)

The 2013 New York City Marathon was the 43rd running of the annual marathon race in New York City, New York, which took place on Sunday, November 3. It followed a one-year hiatus after the 2012 event was canceled due to Hurricane Sandy. Geoffrey Mutai of Kenya won the men's division with a time of 2:08:24, his second consecutive win in New York. Priscah Jeptoo, also from Kenya, won the women's division with a time of 2:25:07. The two winners each received $100,000 in prize money, with Jeptoo capturing the World Marathon Majors title for $500,000.

In the women's wheelchair division, Tatyana McFadden of the United States completed a historic sweep of the Boston, London, Chicago, and New York marathons in the same year, winning in 1:59:13. She became the first person to win four major marathons in a single calendar year. Switzerland's Marcel Hug won the men's wheelchair division in 1:40:14.

Jimmy Jenson became the first person with Down syndrome to run the entire New York City Marathon, and Joy Johnson became the oldest woman to do so at age 86.

A record of 50,740 runners participated, of which 50,062 finished the marathon (30,536 men and 19,526 women). This was the largest number of participants of any marathon in history. This was the final race for marathon record holder Joy Johnson. The marathon also saw its one millionth overall starter since its start in 1970. The marathon was sponsored by ING Group.

== Organization ==
Security was notably increased at the marathon, following the Boston Marathon bombing on April 15, 2013 which resulted the fatalities of three spectators and injured hundreds. Mandatory baggage screenings, surveillance helicopters, and inspection of runners were implemented.

== Race summary ==
The wheelchair division was scheduled to start at 8:30 a.m. EST, the elite women's division at 9:10 a.m., and the elite men's division at 9:40 a.m. The last wave of runners was scheduled to start at 10:55 a.m. At 9:00 a.m., the temperature at the starting line was a cool and windy 46 °F (8 °C), with a headwind for much of the race, which approached 20 mph (32 km/h) and hampered the runners.

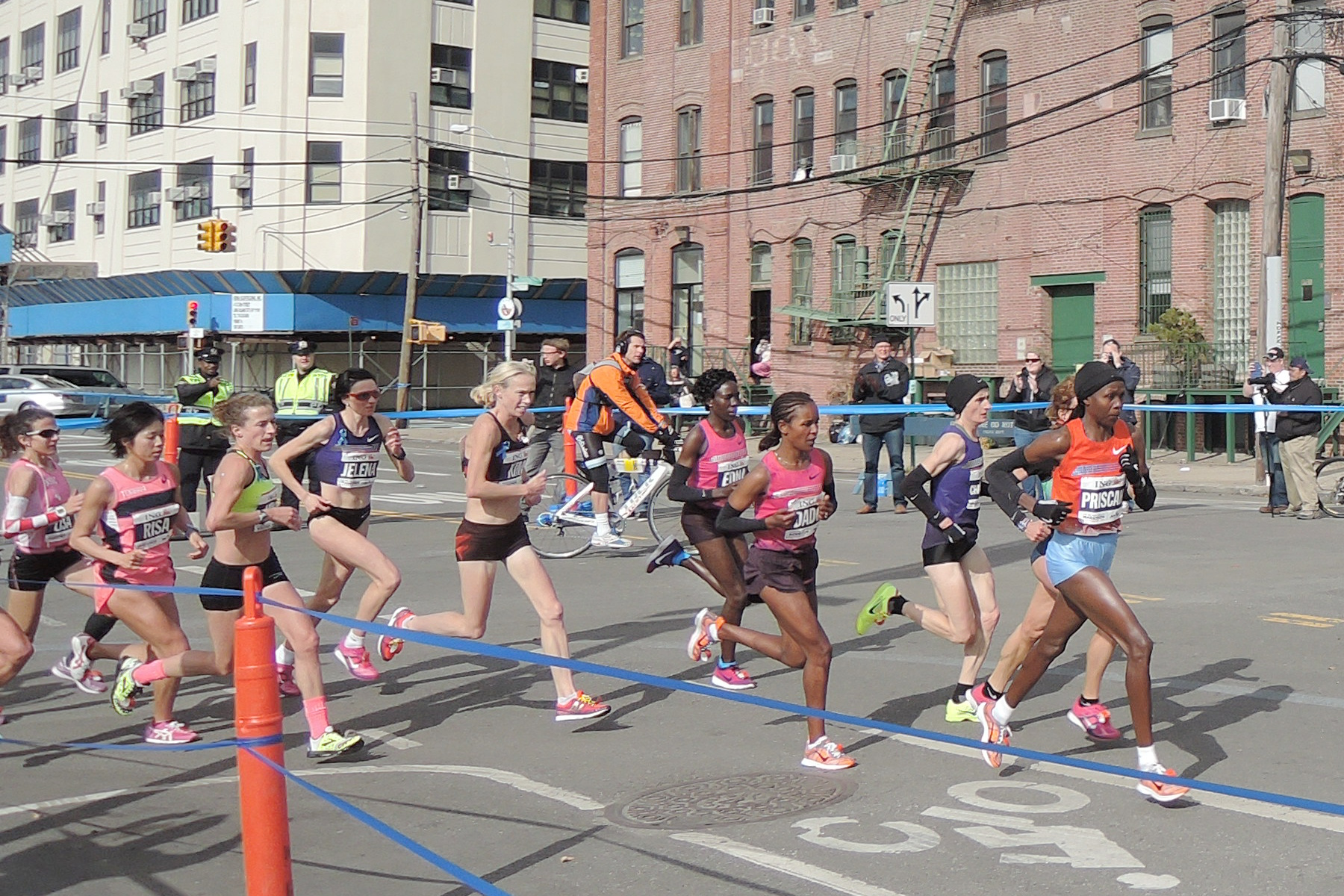
Lead women at Mile 14

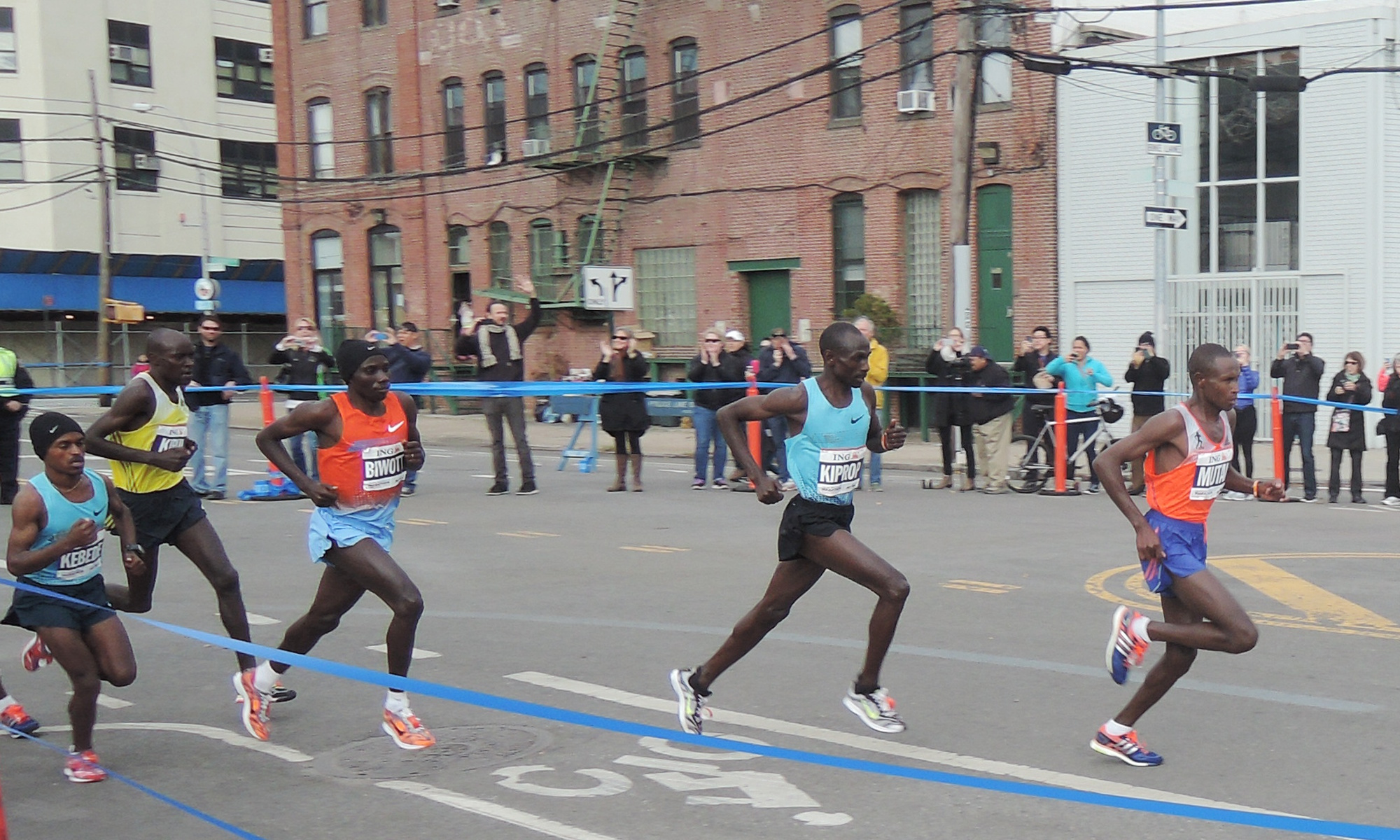
Lead men at Mile 14

=== Women's division ===
After the first 3.1 miles (5 km), Bizunesh Deba, the eventual second-place finisher, and Tigist Tufa, the eventual eighth-place finisher, had taken a significant lead, 80 seconds ahead of the rest of the pack. At 12.4 mi (20 km) into the race, Deba and Tufa were 3 minutes ahead of the rest of the pack. Eventual winner Priscah Jeptoo trailed by 3:30 at the halfway point. Deba and Tufa maintained their lead after 16 mi (26 km), as the race entered Manhattan.

Jeptoo closed to 1:30 behind the lead by the 20 mi (32 km) mark, after breaking from the pack on the Queensboro Bridge. With 3 mi (4.8 km) left, Deba was still in first place, while Jeptoo had overtaken Tufa for second place and drawn to 38 seconds behind Deba. Jeptoo caught up to Deba in Central Park just before 24 mi (39 km) into the race, then overtook Deba to win the race, finishing 48 seconds ahead in 2:25:07.

=== Men's division ===
After the first 3.1 miles (5 km), Meb Keflezighi, the eventual 23rd-place finisher, led with a time of 15:42. The men's race had a tighter lead pack than the women's for the first 20 mi (32 km), when Geoffrey Mutai, the eventual winner, and Stanley Biwott, the eventual fifth-place finisher, broke away from the pack. Mutai and Biwott continued to lead the pack after 22 mi (35 km). Mutai then pulled ahead of Biwott to lead by 9 seconds after 23 mi (37 km), and led him by 33 seconds after 24 mi (39 km). Biwott fell back to finish fifth, while Mutai maintained his lead to win the race in 2:08:24, finishing 52 seconds ahead of second-place Tsegaye Kebede.

== Results ==
=== Men ===
Position	Athlete	Nationality	Time
1st place, gold medalist(s)	Geoffrey Mutai	Kenya	2:08:24
2nd place, silver medalist(s)	Tsegaye Kebede	Ethiopia	2:09:15
3rd place, bronze medalist(s)	Lusapho April	South Africa	2:09:45
4	Julius Arile	Kenya	2:10:03
5	Stanley Biwott	Kenya	2:10:41
6	Masato Imai	Japan	2:10:45
7	Jackson Kiprop	Uganda	2:10:56
8	Peter Cheruiyot Kirui	Kenya	2:11:23
9	Wesley Korir	Kenya	2:11:34
10	Daniele Meucci	Italy	2:12:03
11	Yuki Kawauchi	Japan	2:12:29
12	Stephen Kiprotich	Uganda	2:13:05
13	Ryan Vail	United States	2:13:23
14	Jeffrey Eggleston	United States	2:16:35
15	Bouabdellah Tahri	France	2:18:16
16	Khalid En Guady	Morocco	2:22:03
17	Radosław Dudycz	Poland	2:22:07
18	Junior Jovadir	Brazil	2:22:35
19	Tesfaye Assefa	Ethiopia	2:22:38
20	Christian Thompson	United States	2:22:48
—	Jason Hartmann	United States	DNF
—	Augustus Maiyo	United States	DNF
—	Viktor Röthlin	Switzerland	DNF
—	Nick Willis	New Zealand	DNF
—	Martin Lel	Kenya	DNF

=== Women ===
Position	Athlete	Nationality	Time
1st place, gold medalist(s)	Priscah Jeptoo	Kenya	2:25:07
2nd place, silver medalist(s)	Bizunesh Deba	Ethiopia	2:25:56
3rd place, bronze medalist(s)	Jeļena Prokopčuka	Latvia	2:27:47
4	Christelle Daunay	France	2:28:14
5	Valeria Straneo	Italy	2:28:22
6	Kim Smith	New Zealand	2:28:49
7	Sabrina Mockenhaupt	Germany	2:29:10
8	Tigist Tufa	Ethiopia	2:29:24
9	Edna Kiplagat	Kenya	2:30:04
10	Diane Nukuri	Burundi	2:30:09
11	Risa Shigetomo	Japan	2:31:54
12	Lisa Nemec	Croatia	2:34:49
13	Adriana Nelson	United States	2:35:05
14	Firehiwot Dado	Ethiopia	2:38:06
15	Kathleen DiCamillo	United States	2:40:03
16	Aziza Aliyu	Ethiopia	2:40:27
17	Vera Monica Nunes†	Portugal	2:41:16
18	Mattie Suver	United States	2:41:18
19	Yolanda Caballero	Colombia	2:41:23
20	Amy Cragg	United States	2:42:50
—	Tetyana Hamera-Shmyrko	Ukraine	DQ
—	Ana Dulce Félix	Portugal	DNF
—	Janet Cherobon-Bawcom	United States	DNF

- † Ran in mass race

=== Wheelchair men ===
Position	Athlete	Nationality	Time
1st place, gold medalist(s)	Marcel Hug	Switzerland	1:40:14
2nd place, silver medalist(s)	Ernst van Dyk	South Africa	1:40:14
3rd place, bronze medalist(s)	Kurt Fearnley	Australia	1:40:15
4	Masazumi Soejima	Japan	1:40:16
5	Kota Hokinoue	Japan	1:40:16
6	Krige Schabort	United States	1:42:25
7	Pierre Fairbank	United States	1:42:29
8	Aaron Pike	United States	1:44:54
9	Hiroyuki Yamamoto	Japan	1:45:23
10	Josh George	United States	

=== Wheelchair women ===
Position	Athlete	Nationality	Time
1st place, gold medalist(s)	Tatyana McFadden	United States	1:59:13
2nd place, silver medalist(s)	Wakako Tsuchida	Japan	2:02:54
3rd place, bronze medalist(s)	Manuela Schär	Switzerland	2:03:53
4	Amanda McGrory	United States	2:05:06
5	Susannah Scaroni	United States	2:05:07
6	Christie Dawes	Australia	2:06:17
7	Shirley Reilly	United States	2:11:10
8	Shelly Woods	United States	2:14:31
9	Chelsea McClammer	United States	2:20:55
10	Diane Roy	Canada	2:25:40

=== Handcycle men ===
Position	Athlete	Nationality	Time
1st place, gold medalist(s)	Alfredo Dellossantos	United States	1:30:10
2nd place, silver medalist(s)	Massard Stéphane	France	1:35:57
3rd place, bronze medalist(s)	Saverio di Bari	Italy	1:36:01
4	Samuel Spencer	United States	1:36:52
5	Anthony Robinson	United States	1:39:36

=== Handcycle women ===
Position	Athlete	Nationality	Time
1st place, gold medalist(s)	Minda Dentler	United States	2:05:48
2nd place, silver medalist(s)	Helene Hines	United States	2:14:01
3rd place, bronze medalist(s)	Ashli Molinero	United States	2:14:35
4	Kerstin Abele	Germany	2:36:16
5	Erica Davis	United States	1:39:36
