= 2015 Boston Marathon =

Footrace in Boston, Massachusetts, US

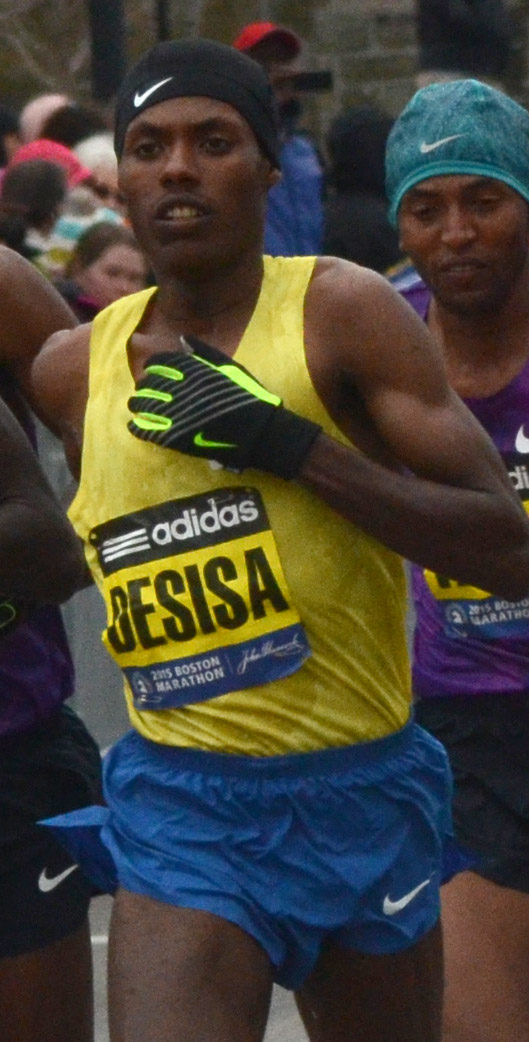
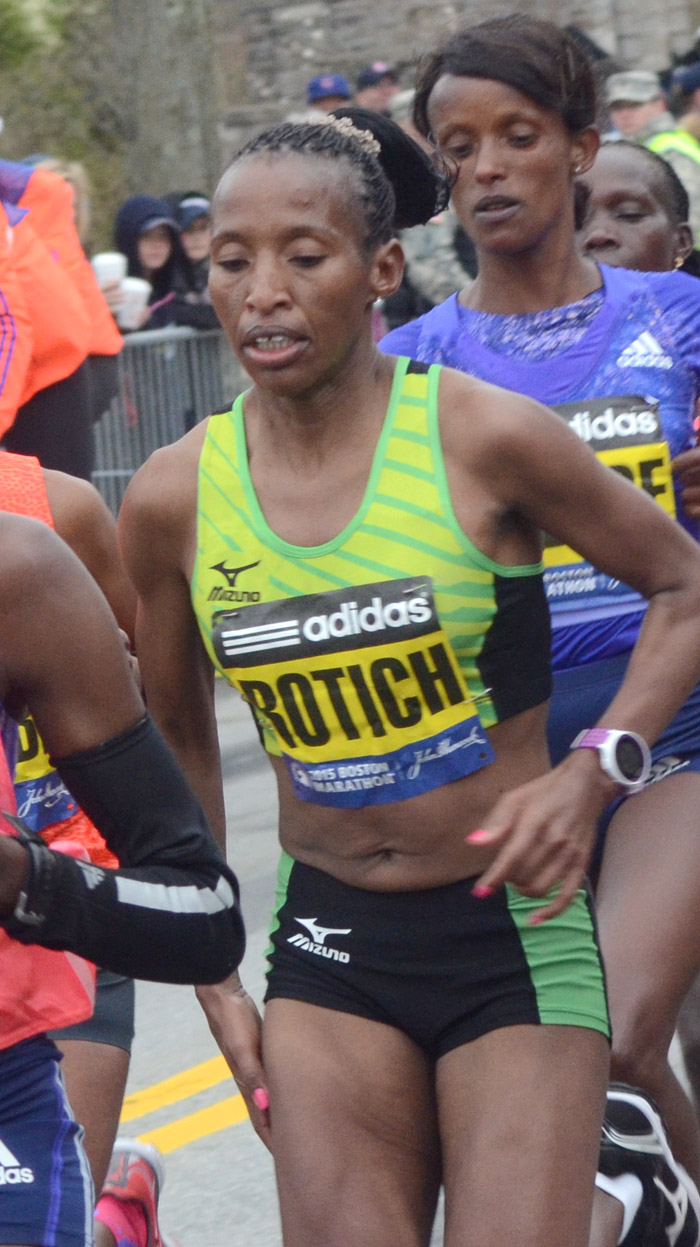
- Winners Lelisa Desisa Benti and Caroline Rotich, approaching halfway point
- Venue: Boston
- Dates: April 20

Champions
- Men: Lelisa Desisa (2:09:17)
- Women: Caroline Rotich (2:24:55)
- Wheelchair men: Marcel Hug (1:29:53)
- Wheelchair women: Tatyana McFadden (1:52:54)

The 2015 Boston Marathon was the 119th running of the Boston Athletic Association's mass-participation marathon. It took place on Monday, April 20 (Patriots' Day in Massachusetts). The men's race was won by Lelisa Desisa from Ethiopia in a time of 2:09:17. Caroline Rotich of Kenya won the women's race with a time 2:24:55.

== Course, preparation, and field ==
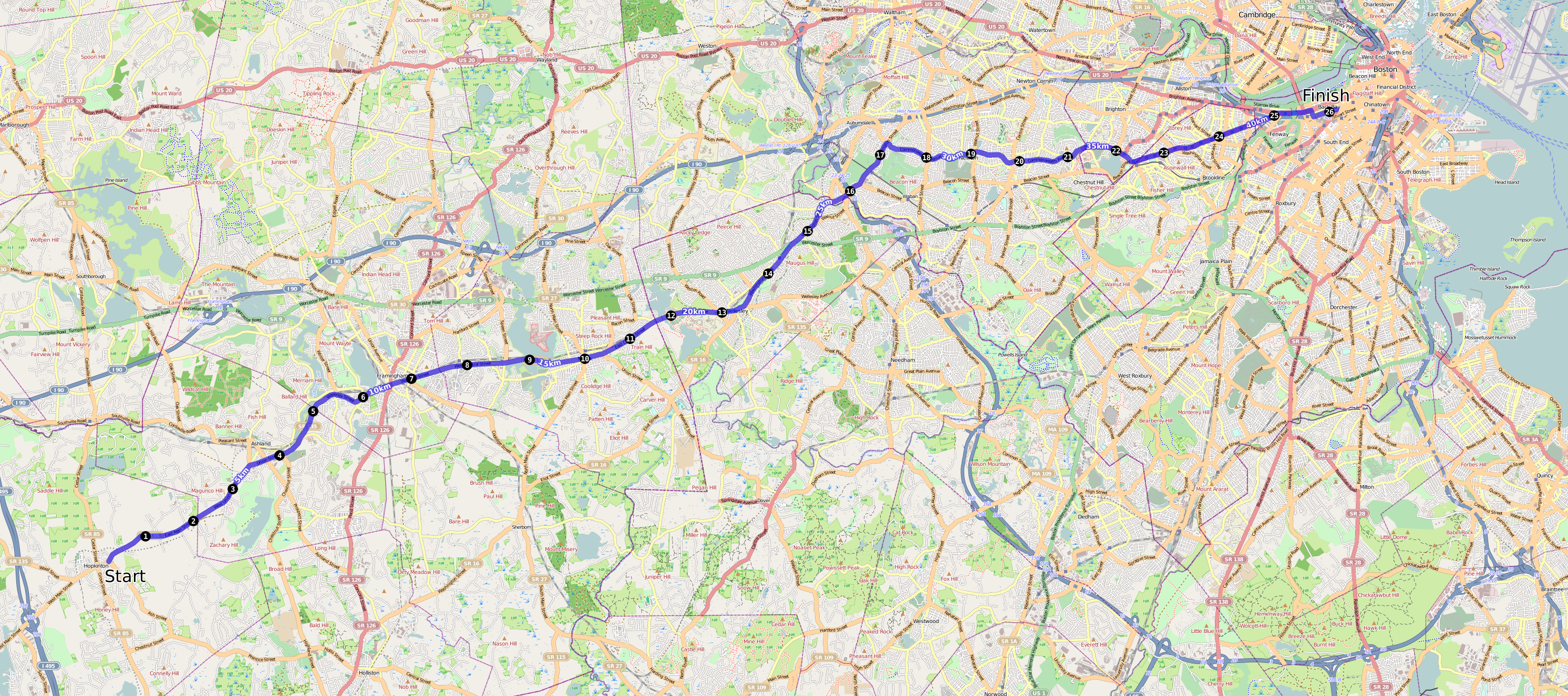
Course map

The event ran along the same winding course the Marathon has followed for many decades‍—‌26 miles 385 yards (42.195 km) of roads and city streets, through eight Massachusetts cities and towns, to the finish line beside the Boston Public Library, on Boylston Street in Boston's Copley Square. The Marathon had about 30,000 entries. All 50 US states and all Canadian provinces were represented at the marathon, as well as several U.S territories, including American Samoa, Puerto Rico, and the U.S. Virgin Islands.

Training for the 2015 marathon in the Greater Boston area was difficult because Boston received over 100 inches (250 cm) of snow during the previous winter. This resulted in many people trying to find ways to work around the weather, such as training on treadmills and indoor tracks, and by obtaining more equipment designed for the weather Boston received.

All but one of the four defending champions participated in the marathon. Rita Jeptoo, who set a course record in 2014, was the exception. She is serving a two-year ban for a positive drug test taken in September 2014, which did not void her record.

== Race ==
On a cold and rainy day, turnout for the 2015 Boston Marathon was lighter than the one million spectators race officials had planned for. Stiff winds slowed race times. Security was described as "visible but not intrusive" as local and state police combined forces with National Guard soldiers to keep things safe.

=== Men ===
The men's race got off to a moderately paced start with Dathan Ritzenhein and defending champion Meb Keflezighi of the United States heading a ten-man lead pack. A quarter of the way in, Lelisa Desisa from Ethiopia decided to push the pace. As the pace quickened, the lead group fell from twelve to nine with four Kenyans, four Ethiopians, and Keflezighi leading the way. Ritzenhein had fallen 15 seconds back but picked up his pace, rejoining and then passing the lead group. At Heartbreak Hill the field thinned. Keflezighi briefly took the lead, but fell well off the pace when he choked on some water around the 22-mile (35 km) mark and vomited five times as a result.

With two miles to go, Desisa pulled away from the field. Desisa, who had been among the lead group all race, finished with a time of 2:09:17, beating fellow countryman Yemane Adhane Tsegay by 31 seconds. The 1–2 finish was the first for Ethiopia in the race's history. Kenya's Wilson Chebet finished in third place, 34 seconds behind Tsegay. Ritzenhein was the highest finishing American in seventh place, followed by Keflezighi in eighth.

Desisa had previously won the 2013 edition of the race. However, his win that day was overshadowed by the Boston Marathon bombing hours later. In the 2015 post race festivities, Boston Athletic Association spokesman Jack Fleming paid homage to Desisa's 2013 win saying "Lelisa did not get to have the kind of victory celebration that a champion of the Boston Marathon should have. Lelisa, we want you to get your due today." Desisa's win by 31 seconds was the largest margin of victory since Robert Kipkoech Cheruiyot won by 1:18 in the 2008 Boston Marathon. It also made him the first non-Kenyan to win the race twice since England's Geoff Smith won back-to-back races in 1984 and 1985. The win came with a $150,000 prize, a golden olive wreath, and a winner's medal. "This medal, I think, is for me," he told the crowd. (In 2013, he had donated his medal to the city of Boston in memory of the bombing victims.)

=== Women ===
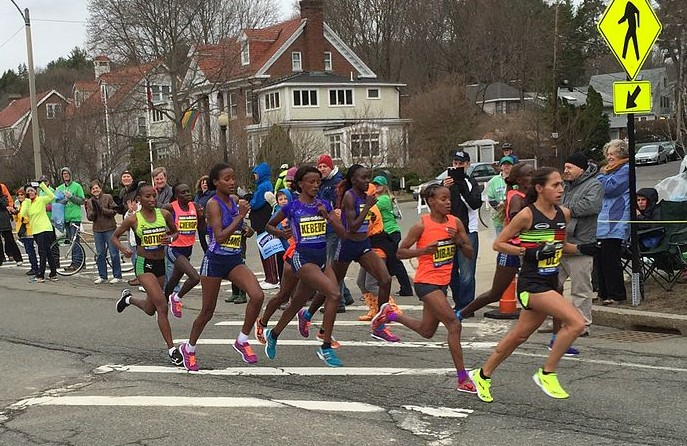
Lead group of nine women at mile 19, with Caroline Rotich on left

In the women's race, a lead group of nine was thinned to three as Ethiopia's Bizunesh Deba picked up the pace with a 5:08 24th mile. For a while, Deba and fellow Ethiopian Mare Dibaba worked together to hold back Caroline Rotich of Kenya. However, Deba tightened up entering Boylston Street and fell off the pace. Rotich and Dibaba raced the final quarter mile side by side.

Dibaba briefly took the lead, but Rotich out kicked her in the final 100 yards for a 4-second victory, finishing with a time of 2:24:55. Deba placed third, ten seconds behind Dibaba, following up her second-place finish in 2014. Desiree Linden of the United States placed fourth, thirty seconds back of Deba, after leading for much of the race. Rotich did not lead at a single checkpoint during the race. Rotich's win was her first Boston Marathon title, and the fifth straight win for Kenya in the women's race.

=== Wheelchair ===
Earlier in the day, Marcel Hug of Switzerland won his first title in the men's wheelchair race, beating South Africa's Ernst Van Dyk who was looking for an eleventh Boston Marathon crown. America's Tatyana McFadden won the women's wheelchair race for the third straight year.

== Results table ==
Official results from the Boston Athletic Association:

Elite Men
Place	Athlete	Nationality	Time
1	Lelisa Desisa	Ethiopia	2:09:17
2	Yemane Tsegay	Ethiopia	2:09:48
3	Wilson Chebet	Kenya	2:10:22
4	Bernard Kipyego	Kenya	2:10:47
5	Wesley Korir	Kenya	2:10:49
6	Frankline Chepkwony	Kenya	2:10:52
7	Dathan Ritzenhein	United States	2:11:20
8	Meb Keflezighi	United States	2:12:42
9	Tadese Tola	Ethiopia	2:13:35
10	Vitaliy Shafar	Ukraine	2:13:52

Elite Women
Place	Athlete	Nationality	Time
1	Caroline Rotich	Kenya	2:24:55
2	Mare Dibaba	Ethiopia	2:24:59
3	Bizunesh Deba	Ethiopia	2:25:09
4	Desiree Linden	United States	2:25:39
5	Sharon Cherop	Kenya	2:26:05
6	Caroline Kilel	Kenya	2:26:40
7	Aberu Kebede	Ethiopia	2:26:52
8	Shure Demise	Ethiopia	2:27:14
9	Shalane Flanagan	United States	2:27:47
10	Joyce Chepkirui	Kenya	2:29:07

=== Wheelchair ===
Men
Place	Athlete	Nationality	Time
1	Marcel Hug	Switzerland	1:29:53
2	Ernst Van Dyk	South Africa	1:36:27
3	Masazumi Soejima	Japan	1:36:28
4	Kota Hokinoue	Japan	1:36:29
5	Tomasz Hamerlak	Poland	1:38:14

Women
Place	Athlete	Nationality	Time
1	Tatyana McFadden	United States	1:52:54
2	Wakako Tsuchida	Japan	1:53:48
3	Susannah Scaroni	United States	1:57:21
4	Amanda McGrory	United States	1:57:21
5	Sandra Graf	Switzerland	1:59:18
