= 2011 New York City Marathon =

Footrace held in New York City

42nd New York City Marathon
- Venue: New York City, New York
- Date: November 6

Champions
- Men: Geoffrey Mutai (2:05:06)
- Women: Firehiwot Dado (2:23:15)
- Wheelchair men: Masazumi Soejima (1:31:41)
- Wheelchair women: Amanda McGrory (1:50:24)

The 2011 New York City Marathon was the 42nd running of the annual marathon race in New York City, New York, which took place on Sunday, November 6. Sponsored by ING Group, it was the final race of the 2010/11 World Marathon Majors series and an IAAF Gold Label Road Race. Geoffrey Mutai of Kenya won the men's elite race in a course record time of 2:05:06 hours while Ethiopia's Firehiwot Dado won the women's section in a time of 2:23:15.

In the wheelchair races, Japan's Masazumi Soejima (1:31:41) and America's Amanda McGrory (1:50:24) won the men's and women's divisions, respectively. In the handcycle race, former racing driver Alex Zanardi of Italy won the men's race in 1:13:58 while Poland's Renata Kaluza took the women's title in 1:49:49.

A then-record high of 47,107 runners entered the competition, with a total of 46,536 runners finishing the distance (29,669 men and 16,867 women). At this race Joy Johnson became the oldest female marathon finisher at age 84.

== Results ==
=== Men ===
Position	Athlete	Nationality	Time
1st place, gold medalist(s)	Geoffrey Mutai	Kenya	2:05:06
2nd place, silver medalist(s)	Emmanuel Kipchirchir Mutai	Kenya	2:06:28
3rd place, bronze medalist(s)	Tsegaye Kebede	Ethiopia	2:07:14
4	Gebregziabher Gebremariam	Ethiopia	2:08:00
5	Jaouad Gharib	Morocco	2:08:26
6	Meb Keflezighi	United States	2:09:13
7	Abdellah Falil	Morocco	2:10:35
8	Mathew Kisorio	Kenya	2:10:58
9	Ed Moran	United States	2:11:47
10	Viktor Röthlin	Switzerland	2:12:26
11	Abdelkabir Saji	Morocco	2:13:47
12	Juan Luis Barrios	Mexico	2:14:10
13	Teklu Deneke	Ethiopia	2:16:20
14	Bobby Curtis	United States	2:16:44
15	Tesfaye Assefa	Ethiopia	2:19:24
16	Abdelaziz Atmani	United States	2:19:36
17	Bazu Worku	Ethiopia	2:20:22
18	Fikadu Lemma	Ethiopia	2:20:41
19	Rens Dekkers	Netherlands	2:22:48
20	John Beattie	United Kingdom	2:23:43
—	Ezkyas Sisay	Ethiopia	DQ
—	Shadrack Kiptoo Biwott	Kenya	DNF
—	William Naranjo	Colombia	DNF

- Ezkyas Sisay of Ethiopia originally placed ninth in a time of 2:11:04 hours, but was subsequently disqualified for doping.

== Women ==
Position	Athlete	Nationality	Time
1st place, gold medalist(s)	Firehiwot Dado	Ethiopia	2:23:15
2nd place, silver medalist(s)	Bizunesh Deba	Ethiopia	2:23:19
3rd place, bronze medalist(s)	Mary Jepkosgei Keitany	Kenya	2:23:38
4	Ana Dulce Félix	Portugal	2:25:40
5	Kim Smith	New Zealand	2:25:46
6	Caroline Kilel	Kenya	2:25:57
7	Caroline Rotich	Kenya	2:27:06
8	Isabellah Andersson	Sweden	2:28:29
9	Jo Pavey	United Kingdom	2:28:42
10	Galina Bogomolova	Russia	2:29:03
11	Misiker Mekonen	Ethiopia	2:31:40
12	Molly Pritz	United States	2:31:52
13	Werknesh Kidane	Ethiopia	2:33:08
14	Alessandra Aguilar	Spain	2:33:08
15	Serkalem Biset	Ethiopia	2:33:22
16	Lauren Fleshman	United States	2:37:22
17	Aziza Aliyu	Ethiopia	2:38:32
18	Camille Herron	United States	2:40:06
19	Jennifer Houck	United States	2:41:00
20	Diane Nukuri	Burundi	2:41:21
—	Inga Abitova	Russia	DNF
—	Jéssica Augusto	Portugal	DNF
—	Jennifer Rhines	United States	DNF
—	Alem Ashebir	Ethiopia	DNF
—	Alene Shewarge	Ethiopia	DNF

== Wheelchair men ==
Position	Athlete	Nationality	Time
1st place, gold medalist(s)	Masazumi Soejima	Japan	1:31:41
2nd place, silver medalist(s)	Kurt Fearnley	Australia	1:33:56
3rd place, bronze medalist(s)	Kota Hokinoue	Japan	1:34:21
4	Heinz Frei	Switzerland	1:37:24
5	Marcel Hug	Switzerland	1:38:42
6	Tomasz Hamerlak	Poland	1:38:43
7	Josh George	United States	1:39:02
8	Josh Cassidy	Canada	1:39:30
9	Denis Lemeunier	France	1:41:11
10	Rafael Botello	Spain	1:42:30

== Wheelchair women ==
Position	Athlete	Nationality	Time
1st place, gold medalist(s)	Amanda McGrory	United States	1:50:24
2nd place, silver medalist(s)	Shelly Woods	United Kingdom	1:52:50
3rd place, bronze medalist(s)	Tatyana McFadden	United States	1:52:52
4	Wakako Tsuchida	Japan	1:52:53
5	Christie Dawes	Australia	1:52:54
6	Diane Roy	Canada	1:57:59
7	Edith Wolf	Switzerland	2:01:04
8	Francesca Porcellato	Italy	2:09:09
9	Christina Schwab	United States	2:10:55
10	Sandra Hager	Switzerland	2:18:14

== Handcycle men ==
Position	Athlete	Nationality	Time
1st place, gold medalist(s)	Alex Zanardi	Italy	1:13:58
2nd place, silver medalist(s)	Rafał Wilk	Poland	1:14:00
3rd place, bronze medalist(s)	Ludovic Narce	France	1:22:40
4	Fernando Rocha	Brazil	1:26:56
5	Jarrod Moncur	Australia	1:27:43

== Handcycle women ==
Position	Athlete	Nationality	Time
1st place, gold medalist(s)	Renata Kaluza	Poland	1:49:49
2nd place, silver medalist(s)	Minda Dentler	United States	1:53:16
3rd place, bronze medalist(s)	Ashley Cooper	United States	2:08:28
4	Alexia Bouckoms	United States	3:56:55
5	Rosalie Ames	United States	4:00:19
