= Joy Johnson =

Joy Johnson may refer to:

- Joy Johnson (university administrator) (21st century), Canadian nurse and medical researcher
- Joy Johnson (runner) (1926–2013), American runner
- E. Joy Johnson (1876–1946), American novelist
