= Wilson Kiprop =

Kenyan long-distance runner (born 1987)

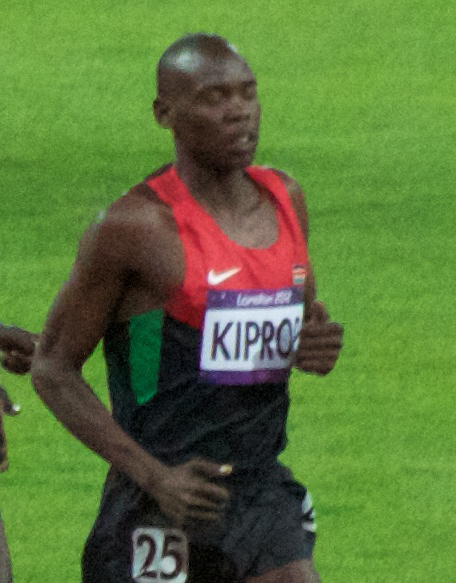
- Kiprop at the 2012 Olympics

Personal information
- Nationality: Kenya
- Born: 14 April 1987 (age 39)

Sport
- Sport: Long-distance running
- Events: 10,000 m, Half marathon, Marathon
- Coached by: Renato Canova

Achievements and titles
- Personal bests: 10,000 m: 27:01.98 (2012) Half marathon: 59:15 (2012) Marathon: 2:09:09 (2010)
Medal record
Men's athletics
Representing Kenya
World Half Marathon Championships
Gold medal – first place	2010 Nanning	Individual
Gold medal – first place	2010 Nanning	Team
African Championships
Gold medal – first place	2010 Nairobi	10,000 m

Wilson Kiprop (born 14 April 1987 in Soi, Uasin Gishu District) is a Kenyan long-distance runner, who specialises in the 10,000 metres and half marathon. He was the world champion at the IAAF World Half Marathon Championships in 2010 and was the 10,000 m gold medalist at the 2010 African Championships in Athletics.

== Biography ==
He started competing at the top level in 2008, winning competitions in Italy (cross and road races) and working under two Italian coaches, Renato Canova and Gabriele Nicola. He was the 2008 champion at the Cross della Vallagarina and the Corrida di San Geminiano. The following year he won the Vallagarina race for a second time running and came first at the Eurocross and Trofeo Sant'Agata races.

In 2009, an injury prevented him from competing for six 6 months, but he resolved the problem by working in the gym, together with a limited amount of running. He also improved his running posture and began the 2010 season with a view to competing in a marathon in spring. After his debut in the Prague Marathon (where he ran a time of 2:09:09 hours) and a win at the Paris Half Marathon, Kiprop turned to at the 10,000 m. His victory over the distance at the Kenyan Championships was unexpected, and his time (27:26.93) bettered the world best performance at altitude by almost 18 seconds. After that performance, Wilson was selected for the African Championships in Nairobi, where he won in the 10,000 m gold medal, beating Moses Ndiema Kipsiro.

After a victory in Lille Half Marathon in September with his best time of 59:34, he focused his preparation towards the 2010 IAAF World Half Marathon Championships in Nanning. He defeated the defending champion, Zersenay Tadese, breaking his four-year unbeaten streak at the event.

The following year he was selected for the 10,000 m at the 2011 World Championships, but had to withdraw due to injury. He returned to action in November, winning at the Tuskys Wareng Cross Country. He closed the year with an appearance at the BOClassic 10K and he narrowly finished second to Edwin Soi.

He defeated marathoner Geoffrey Mutai to win the Discovery Kenya Cross Country at the start of 2012. Despite being the pre-race favourite for the Berlin Half Marathon, he was beaten into second place by the lesser-known Denis Koech, although he ran a personal best time of 59:15 minutes. He secured his first place on the Kenyan Olympic team at the 2012 Prefontaine Classic, winning the 10,000 m trial race with a personal best of 27:01.98 minutes. Despite this strong performance, he failed to finish the distance when it came to the 2012 Olympic 10,000 metres final.

In his first race of 2013, he won the Roma-Ostia Half Marathon, equalling his best of 59:15 minutes. He had a poor showing at the Hamburg Marathon, coming fifteenth in 2:19:20 hours, then failed to finish at the Kenyan 10,000 m trials. He won July's Giro di Castelbuono 10K, narrowly edging Atanaw Ayalew at the line. He failed to finish the 10,000 m Kenyan Trials and missed the 2013 World Championships in Athletics as a result. Instead he focused on the road and won the Portugal Half Marathon in October with a course record of 1:00:19 hours. He was in the top three at the Giro al Sas, BOclassic and Delhi Half Marathon that year.

He began 2014 with his second career win at the Discovery Kenya Cross.

== Personal bests ==
Event	Time	Venue	Date
10,000 m	27:01.98	Eugene	1 June 2012
Half marathon	59:15	Berlin	1 April 2012
Marathon	2:09:09	Prague	9 May 2010
