= Jemima Sumgong =

Kenyan long-distance runner

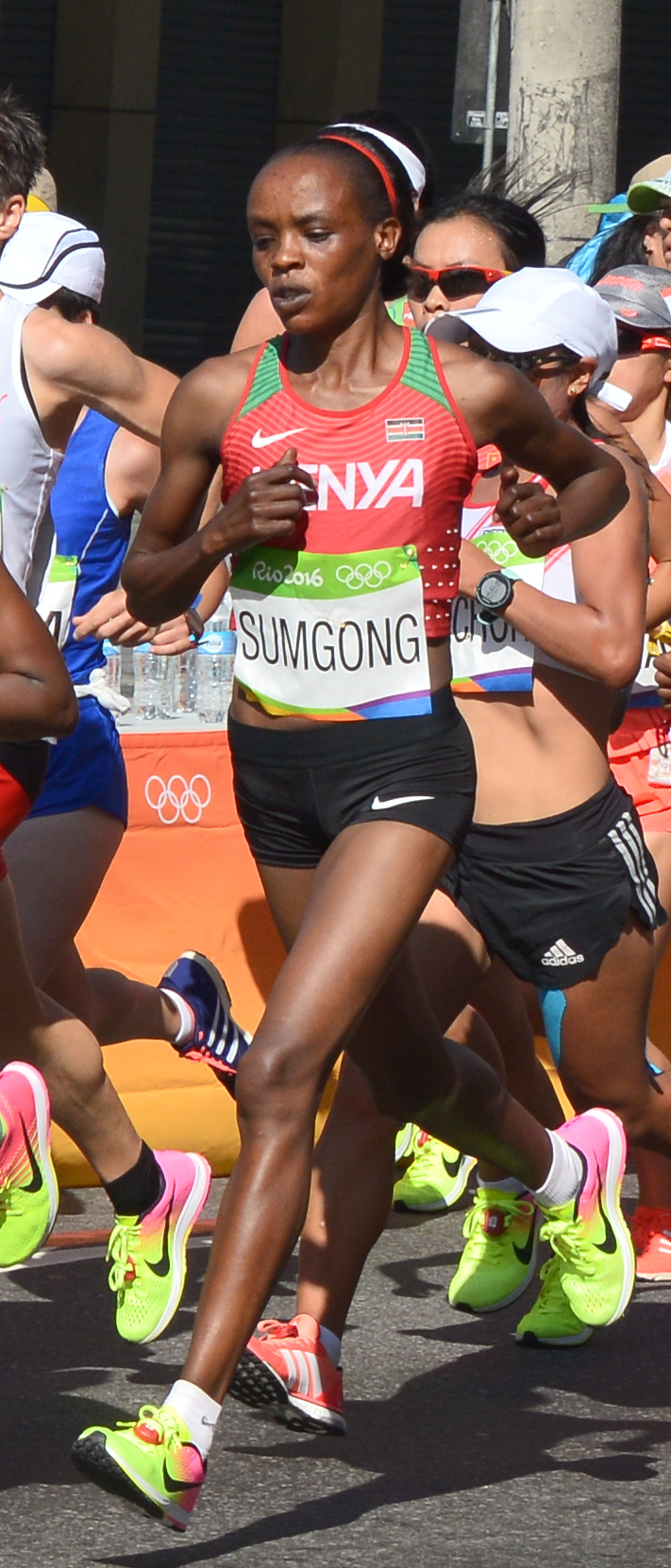
- Sumgong at the 2016 Olympics

Personal information
- Full name: Jemima Jelagat Sumgong
- Nationality: Kenyan
- Born: 21 December 1984 (age 41) Nandi District, Kenya
- Height: 160 cm (5 ft 3 in)
- Weight: 45 kg (99 lb)
- Spouse: Noah Talam

Sport
- Sport: Track & field
- Event: Marathon
- Coached by: Claudio Beradelli

Achievements and titles
- Personal best: 2:20:41
Medal record
Women's athletics
Representing Kenya
Olympic Games
Gold medal – first place	2016 Rio de Janeiro	Marathon
- Updated on 15 August 2016

Jemima Jelagat Sumgong (born 21 December 1984) is a Kenyan long-distance runner specializing in marathon races.

She has won the London, Rotterdam and Las Vegas Marathons, and has finished runner-up at the Boston, Chicago and New York City Marathons. She has a personal best of 2:20:48 for the distance. In the 2016 Olympic Games, at age 31, she won the marathon in warm conditions with a time of 2:24:04, becoming the first female winner from Kenya since women's marathon was introduced to the Olympics in 1984.

Sumgong is currently serving an 8-year ban (until 2027) from athletic competitions after she was tested positive for the banned substance EPO, fabricated her medical records and lied about her whereabouts after the positive test.

== Career ==
=== Early career ===
Hailing from the Nandi District in Kenya, Sumgong began to compete abroad in 2004. In one of her first elite races, she came second at the Gothenburg Half Marathon. She started to establish herself as a runner on the American road circuit in 2005. She won the Ogden Newspapers Classic Half Marathon and Maggie Valley Moonlight Run that year. Further victories followed in 2006, as she won the Get In Gear 10K in Minneapolis, the Cleveland 10K and the Wharf to Wharf 6-Miler. She ran a 15K personal best of 49:39 at the Utica Boilermaker in July and, that November, she ran the fastest ever half marathon in Trinidad and Tobago, winning a race in Saint Augustine in 1:12:08.

Sumgong's first marathon came at the Las Vegas Marathon in 2006 and she won on her first attempt, taking the women's title in a time of 2:35:22. She came third at the Azalea Trail Run the following year. She made her European debut at the 2007 Frankfurt Marathon and she came fourth in an improved time of 2:29:41. Her next outing over the distance came at the San Diego Marathon and she was runner-up in 2:30:18 behind Yulia Gromova, winner of the White Nights Marathon. She signed up to work for the Kenyan Armed Forces in 2009. Taking a break from running, she married Noah Talam (another Kenyan marathon runner) and the couple later had a daughter in 2011. Having missed the 2009 season, she returned in 2010 and was runner-up at the San Blas Half Marathon, fifth at the Berlin Half Marathon and fifth at the San Diego Marathon.

After the birth of her daughter, Sumgong made a successful return in December 2011 at the Castellón Marathon, which she won in a personal best of 2:28:32.

=== 2012 ===
Sumgong was seventh at the highly competitive Kenyan Cross Country Championships at the start of 2012.

At the 2012 Boston Marathon, high-profile withdrawals and hot running conditions worked in her favour as the race came down to a sprint finish against Sharon Cherop, with Sumgong taking the runner-up spot two seconds behind. Sumgong tested positive for the banned substance prednisolone in her post-race anti-doping test and was given a two-year ban from competition by Athletics Kenya. However, she was cleared on appeal by the IAAF in September 2012, as the local injection which Sumgong had received was permitted under the governing body's rules. Cleared to race, Sumgong again finished behind Cherop at that year's Philadelphia Half Marathon, taking third place.

=== 2013 ===
Sumgong was much improved at the 2013 Rotterdam Marathon, as she won the race in a time of 2:23:27 – bettering her previous mark by over six minutes. She lowered her personal best for a second time in 2013 – to 2:20:48 – in finishing second to her training partner Rita Jeptoo at the Chicago Marathon.

=== 2014 ===
Sumgong finished in fourth place at the Boston Marathon in her fastest ever time of 2:20:41 (the downhill and point-to-point nature of the Boston course means that her time is not considered as a personal best). Later in the year, she finished second at the New York City Marathon, losing a close battle with compatriot Mary Keitany, whose winning margin of three seconds equalled the narrowest in race history.

=== 2016 ===
On 24 April, she won the London Marathon with the time of 2:22:58. The event was notable as she fell during the run, but still managed to finish ahead of the rest of the field. On 14 August 2016, she won a gold medal in the Rio Olympics with a time of 2:24:04. Sumgong's 2016 Olympic gold medal is Kenya's first gold medal in the women's Olympic marathon.

=== Doping case ===
Sumgong was to defend her title at the 2017 London Marathon on April 23, but two weeks prior to the race she was suspended after testing positive for erythropoietin (EPO) in an out-of-competition test conducted by the International Association of Athletics Federations (IAAF) in Kenya, announced on April 6, 2017. She was eventually suspended for 4 years on it was announced on 7 November 2017 and her ban would start from 3 April 2017 which is when she was provisionally suspended. Her doping ban was eventually doubled to 8 years and re-started in January 2019 after it was deemed that she had lied and fabricated her medical records, ruling her out of international competitions until 2027. This was her second doping ban in 5 years after she tested positive in 2012 also.
