= Geoffrey Mutai =

Kenyan long-distance runner (born 1981)

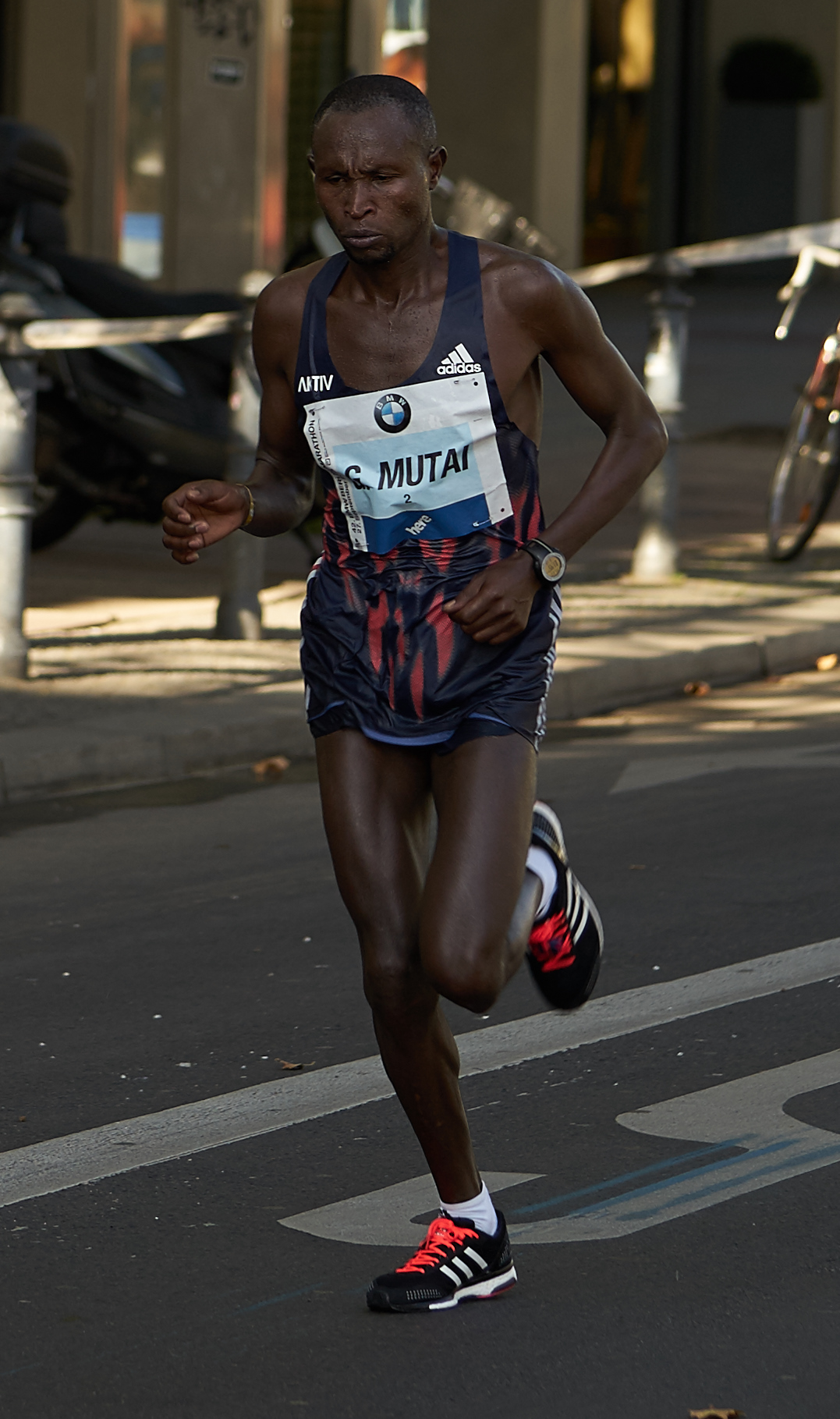

Personal information
- Born: 7 October 1981 (age 44) Mumberes, Koibatek District, Kenya

Sport
- Country: Kenya

Achievements and titles
- Personal bests: 10,000 m: 27:19; 20,000 metres: 56:52; Half marathon: 58:58; Marathon: 2:03:02
Medal record
Men's athletics
Representing Kenya
African Championships
Bronze medal – third place	2010 Nairobi	10,000 m
World Marathon Majors
Gold medal – first place	2013 New York City	Marathon
Gold medal – first place	2012 Berlin	Marathon
Gold medal – first place	2011 New York City	Marathon
Gold medal – first place	2011 Boston	Marathon
Silver medal – second place	2010 Berlin	Marathon

Geoffrey Kiprono Mutai (born 7 October 1981) is a Kenyan long-distance runner who specialises in road running competitions. On 18 April 2011 at the Boston Marathon, Mutai ran the fastest marathon ever at the time in a time of 2 hours 3 minutes 2 seconds (4:41 per mile pace / 2:54 per kilometer pace), though the time was not recognised by the International Association of Athletics Federations as a world record since the Boston course does not meet the criteria to be eligible for the mark.

His other significant victories include the Monaco Marathon. He is also a strong half marathon runner, with wins at the Valencia Half Marathon and RAK Half Marathon, and a best of 58 minutes 58 seconds, to his name. He also won the 2011 New York City Marathon with a time of 2 hours 5 minutes and 6 seconds (4:46 per mile pace), breaking the course record set by Tesfaye Jifar of Ethiopia in 2001, and repeated his performance at the 2013 New York City Marathon with a time of 2 hours 8 minutes and 24 seconds.

== Career ==
Mutai started running in 1994 while at Tuiyotich Primary School in Nakuru. He graduated from primary school in 1998, but financial constraints prevented him from joining a secondary school. Instead, he worked in a farm, but continued his running career. He was selected to represent Kenya at the 2002 World Junior Championships, but could not make the trip as he had no birth certificate. Soon after he was injured and almost quit running. He later joined Kapng'entuny Athletics Club in Eldoret. In 2007 he made his marathon debut, finishing second in the inaugural Kass Marathon in Eldoret. At this race he met his current manager Gerard Van de Veen of Volare Sports, who provided him with the opportunity of competing abroad.

He won the 2008 Monaco Marathon, clocking a time of 2:12:40 to beat second-placed Jacob Kitur. He won the Loopfestijn Voorthuizen 10 km race in a course record time of 28:05 that July. He made significant improvements at the Eindhoven Marathon, setting a new personal best of 2:07:50, which was a course record and over a minute and a half ahead of the opposition.

Mutai opened 2009 with a win at the South Rift Valley 12 km championships. He signed up for the Seoul International Marathon, but was unable to finish the race. He ran at the Daegu Marathon a month later and finished eighth overall with a time of 2:10:45. He returned to the Loopfestijn Voorthuizen race a few months later and improved upon his previous course record, running under 28 minutes for the first time to set a new best of 27:39. He had a second consecutive victory at the Eindhoven Marathon, further improving the course mark and his personal best to 2:07:01. He won the Valencia Half Marathon in late 2009, seeing off the challenge from pre-race favourite Boniface Kirui and setting a new best of 59:30 over the distance.

The Ras Al Khaimah Half Marathon was Mutai's first major race of 2010, and he beat Tadese Tola to the finish line. Although his time of 59:43 was quick, it seemed a relatively modest achievement given the tactical running and the race's historically fast times. He took on the World's Best 10K in Puerto Rico a few weeks later, but Moses Masai and Sammy Kitwara pushed him into third place. Mutai ran one of the fastest marathons ever at the Rotterdam Marathon in April, improving on his previous best by a large margin with a run of 2:04:55. However, Patrick Makau ran even faster and Mutai had to settle for second place. He took to the track in the summer and set a 10,000 m personal best of 27:27:59 for second place at the Kenyan Championships behind Wilson Kiprop. This earned him selection for the 2010 African Athletics Championships and he won the continental bronze medal, while Kiprop took the gold. He was pitted against his Rotterdam rival Makau at the Berlin Marathon and the two maintained the same positions, with Mutai clocking 2:05:10 for second place. He came close to a personal best at the Delhi Half Marathon and won the race by out-kicking Lelisa Desisa.

He earned a place on the World Cross team with a victory at the Kenyan Cross Country Championships, conclusively winning by 44.4 seconds. At the 2011 IAAF World Cross Country Championships he was among the lead pack with 500 m to go but was outstripped by the fast pace and finished fifth.

On 13 April 2014 Mutai finished in the 2014 London Marathon clocking 2:08:18 for sixth place.

=== World Marathon Record ===
On 18 April 2011, Mutai won the Boston Marathon in what was then the fastest time ever recorded for a marathon, which was 2:03.02: this was 57 seconds faster than the world record of 2:03:59, and broke the existing course record of 2:05:52 by almost three minutes. However, due to the point-to-point nature of the (overall, downhill) course, it cannot be ratified as a world record. Running in sunshine and temperatures near 50 °F (10 °C), Mutai was helped by a tailwind blowing 15-to-20 miles per hour. In the late stages, Mutai was pushed by 25-year-old countryman Moses Mosop: the two ran stride-for-stride over the last miles until a final sprint by Mutai gave him the victory by four seconds.

He also competed at the first B.A.A. 10K, which was held in Boston in June, and he won the race in a state record time of 27:19 minutes. At the Giro di Castelbuono, the oldest European road race, he won as it took on a 10K format for the first time. In August he ran the Bogotá Half Marathon in a course record time of 1:02:20 hours, beating Deriba Merga by a margin of over two minutes. In November he won the 2011 New York City Marathon with another quick time of 2:05:06 hours, breaking the course record. This made him the first runner since American legend Bill Rodgers to take both the Boston and New York men's titles in the same year.

He began the 2012 season with a run at the Discovery Cross Country in Kenya and was runner-up to Wilson Kiprop. He returned to try to defend his title at the 2012 Boston Marathon, but dropped out in the second half of the race in hot conditions. As a result, the Kenyan selectors chose not to send him to compete in the marathon at the Olympics, in spite of his pedigree over the distance. He reorganised his race schedule and made his Canadian debut at the Ottawa 10K, winning by a margin of 45 seconds. He defended his B.A.A 10K title with a world-leading run of 27:29 minutes. A world record attempt at the 2012 Berlin Marathon saw him run the fourth fastest time ever (2:04:15), winning just ahead of his training partner Dennis Kimetto. His last outing of the year brought another win, this time at the 15 km Montferland Run, where his time of 42:25 minutes was a personal best and also a course record. He was chosen as the AIMS World Athlete of the Year for a second year running.

He broke 59 minutes for the half marathon for the first time at the 2013 RAK Half Marathon, although his run of 58:58 minutes was only enough for third in the quick race.

== Personal life ==
Born to Andrew Koech and Emmy Koech, Mutai is the eldest of 11 siblings. He is married to Beatrice. They have two daughters,one born in 2009 and the other in 2012.

== Personal bests ==
Event	Time (h:m:s)	Venue	Date
10 kilometres	27:19	Boston, USA	26 June 2011
20 kilometres	56:52	Ras al-Khaimah, United Arab Emirates	19 February 2010
Half marathon	58:58	Ras Al Khaimah, UAE	15 February 2013
Marathon	2:03:02*	Boston, USA	18 April 2011
Marathon	2:04:15	Berlin, Germany	30 September 2012

(*) Downhill and point-to-point course

- All information taken from IAAF profile.

== Achievements ==
=== International competition ===
Year	Competition	Venue	Position	Event	Notes
Representing Kenya
2010	African Championships	Nairobi, Kenya	3rd	10,000 metres	27:33.83
2011	World Cross Country Championships	Punta Umbría, Spain	5th	Senior race	Individual
2011	World Cross Country Championships	Punta Umbría, Spain	1st	Senior race	Team

=== Road races ===
- All results regarding marathon and half marathon

Year	Competition	Venue	Position	Event	Notes
2008	Monaco Marathon	Monte Carlo, Monaco	1st	Marathon	2:12:40
2008	Eindhoven Marathon	Eindhoven, Netherlands	1st	Marathon	2:07:50
2009	Daegu Marathon	Daegu, South Korea	8th	Marathon	2:10:45
2009	Eindhoven Marathon	Eindhoven, Netherlands	1st	Marathon	2:07:01
2009	Valencia Half Marathon	Valencia, Spain	1st	Half Marathon	59:30
2010	New Delhi Half Marathon	New Delhi, India	1st	Half Marathon	59:38
2010	Ras Al Khaimah Half Marathon	Ras Al Khaimah, UAE	1st	Half Marathon	59:43
2010	Rotterdam Marathon	Rotterdam, Netherlands	2nd	Marathon	2:04:55
2010	Berlin Marathon	Berlin, Germany	2nd	Marathon	2:05:10
2011	Boston Marathon	Boston, United States	1st	Marathon	2:03:02 CR
2011	Bogotá Half Marathon	Bogotá, Colombia	1st	Half marathon	1:02:20 CR
2011	New York City Marathon	New York City, United States	1st	Marathon	2:05:06 CR
2012	Berlin Marathon	Berlin, Germany	1st	Marathon	2:04:15
2013	Ras Al Khaimah Half Marathon	Ras Al Khaimah, UAE	3rd	Half Marathon	58:58
2013	New York City Marathon	New York City, United States	1st	Marathon	2:08:24
2014	New York City Half Marathon	New York City, United States	1st	Half Marathon	1:00:50
2014	London Marathon	London, United Kingdom	6th	Marathon	2:08:18
2014	New York City Marathon	New York City, United States	6th	Marathon	2:13:44
2015	Berlin Marathon	Berlin, Germany	5th	Marathon	2:09:29
