= 2000 World Junior Championships in Athletics – Women's 5000 metres =

The women's 5000 metres event at the 2000 World Junior Championships in Athletics was held in Santiago, Chile, at Estadio Nacional Julio Martínez Prádanos on 17 October.

== Medalists ==
Gold	Dorcus Inzikuru; Uganda
Silver	Meseret Defar; Ethiopia
Bronze	Sharon Cherop; Kenya

== Results ==
=== Final ===
17 October

Rank	Name	Nationality	Time	Notes
1st place, gold medalist(s)	Dorcus Inzikuru	Uganda	16:21.32	
2nd place, silver medalist(s)	Meseret Defar	Ethiopia	16:23.69	
3rd place, bronze medalist(s)	Sharon Cherop	Kenya	16:23.73	
4	Kayoko Fukushi	Japan	16:25.01	
5	Fridah Domongole	Kenya	16:28.35	
6	Elvan Can	Turkey	16:33.77	
7	Eyerusalem Kuma	Ethiopia	16:40.07	
8	Wang Xiaoming	China	16:46.75	
9	Carol Henry	Canada	17:23.96	
10	Türkan Erişmiş	Turkey	17:24.66	
11	Jane Makombe	Zimbabwe	17:28.82	
12	Lucélia Peres	Brazil	18:01.84	
13	Valquíria Santos	Brazil	18:57.61	
14	Anna Markelova	Turkmenistan	20:35.19	

== Participation ==
According to an unofficial count, 14 athletes from 10 countries participated in the event.

- Brazil (2)
- Canada (1)
- China (1)
- Ethiopia (2)
- Japan (1)
- Kenya (2)
- Turkey (2)
- Turkmenistan (1)
- Uganda (1)
- Zimbabwe (1)
