= Ogden Newspapers Half Marathon Classic =

Marathon-style races in West Virginia

The Ogden Newspapers Half Marathon Classic, formerly known as the Ogden Newspapers 20K is a series of races held each May in Wheeling, West Virginia. Winners have included: Caroline Rotich, Augustus Mbusya Kavutu, Jemima Sumgong and Rolando Vera. The distance changed in 2011 due to declining numbers.

The race's course, which runs through the Ohio Valley is often referred to as the "Toughest Half Marathon in America" due to its changes in elevation.

Established in 1977, the competition hosted the men's national championship race from 1985 to 1992.
