= Firehiwot Dado =

Ethiopian long-distance runner

Firehiwot Tufa Dado
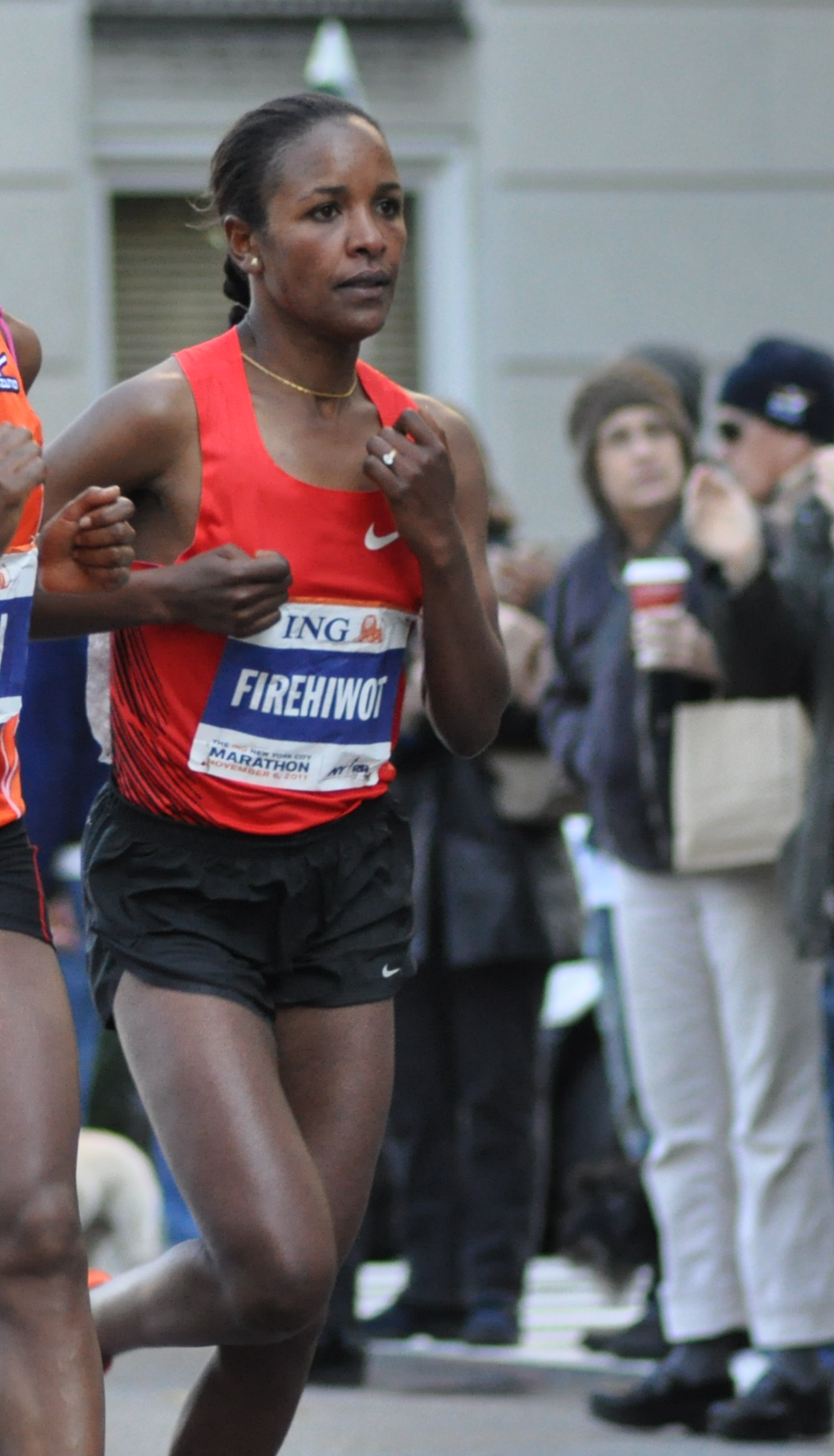

Personal information
- Born: 9 January 1984 (age 42) Assela, Arsi, Ethiopia

Sport
- Country: Ethiopia

Firehiwot Tufa Dado (born January 9, 1984, in Assela, Arsi) is a female long-distance runner from Ethiopia, who won the New York City Marathon in 2011 with a personal best time of 2:23:15 hours. She also took three consecutive victories in the Rome City Marathon.

== Biography ==
She has also competed in 10K competitions and was the 2008 winner of the Casablanca Women's Run. She made her marathon debut that year at the Košice Peace Marathon and managed to finish as runner-up on her first attempt. She received a late-minute invitation to run the Rome City Marathon in March 2009 and went on to surprise the field by winning the race in a time of 2:27:08 hours – over ten minutes faster than her previous best. Her second race over the distance that year came at the Frankfurt Marathon, where she again finished under two and a half hours to take fourth place. Firehiwot won the Boulogne-Billancourt Half Marathon in November with a course record time of 1:09:26 – the first time a woman had run under an hour and ten minutes at the race.

She fell back in the second half the 2010 Mumbai Marathon, eventually taking fifth place, but returned to form at the Rome Marathon, where she defended her title in a best of 2:25:28 hours She set a previous personal best of 2:25:28 in the classic distance on March 21, 2010, in Rome, Italy. The 2010 Fifth Third River Bank Run saw her break the course record for the 25K race, beating Joan Samuelson's time which had stood since 1986. She won the Florence Marathon that year, beating second-placed Meseret Mengistu by almost two minutes.

Firehiwot took an unprecedented third straight title in Rome in 2011 and knocked over a minute off her best in the process, completing the race in 2:24:13 hours. She established herself among the world's foremost women marathon runners with a victory at the 2011 New York City Marathon, where she held off Buzunesh Deba and Mary Keitany to win in a time of 2:23:15 hours. She opened her 2012 season with a course record win at the New York City Half Marathon, where she maintained a fast starting pace to hold off Kim Smith and set a new best of 1:08:35 hours. The 2012 Boston Marathon was undertaken in warm conditions and she managed fourth place behind a Kenyan trio. She won the 2014 Prague Marathon in a time of 2:23:34 as six Ethiopians finished in the top six in the women's competition.

== Achievements ==
Year	Competition	Venue	Position	Event	Notes
Representing Ethiopia
2008	Košice Peace Marathon	Košice, Slovakia	2nd	Marathon	2:37:34
2009	Rome City Marathon	Rome, Italy	1st	Marathon	2:27:08
2009	Frankfurt Marathon	Frankfurt, Germany	4th	Marathon	2:29:20
2010	Mumbai Marathon	Mumbai, India	5th	Marathon	2:33:38
2010	Rome City Marathon	Rome, Italy	1st	Marathon	2:25:28
2010	Florence Marathon	Florence, Italy	1st	Marathon	2:28:58
2011	Rome City Marathon	Rome, Italy	1st	Marathon	2:24:13
2011	New York City Marathon	New York City, US	1st	Marathon	2:23:15
2012	New York City Half Marathon	New York, US	1st	Half Marathon	1:08:35
2012	Boston Marathon	Massachusetts, US	4th	Marathon	2:34:56
2014	Prague Marathon	Prague, Czech Republic	1st	Marathon	2:23:34
