= UAE Healthy Kidney 10K =

Annual running event in New York City

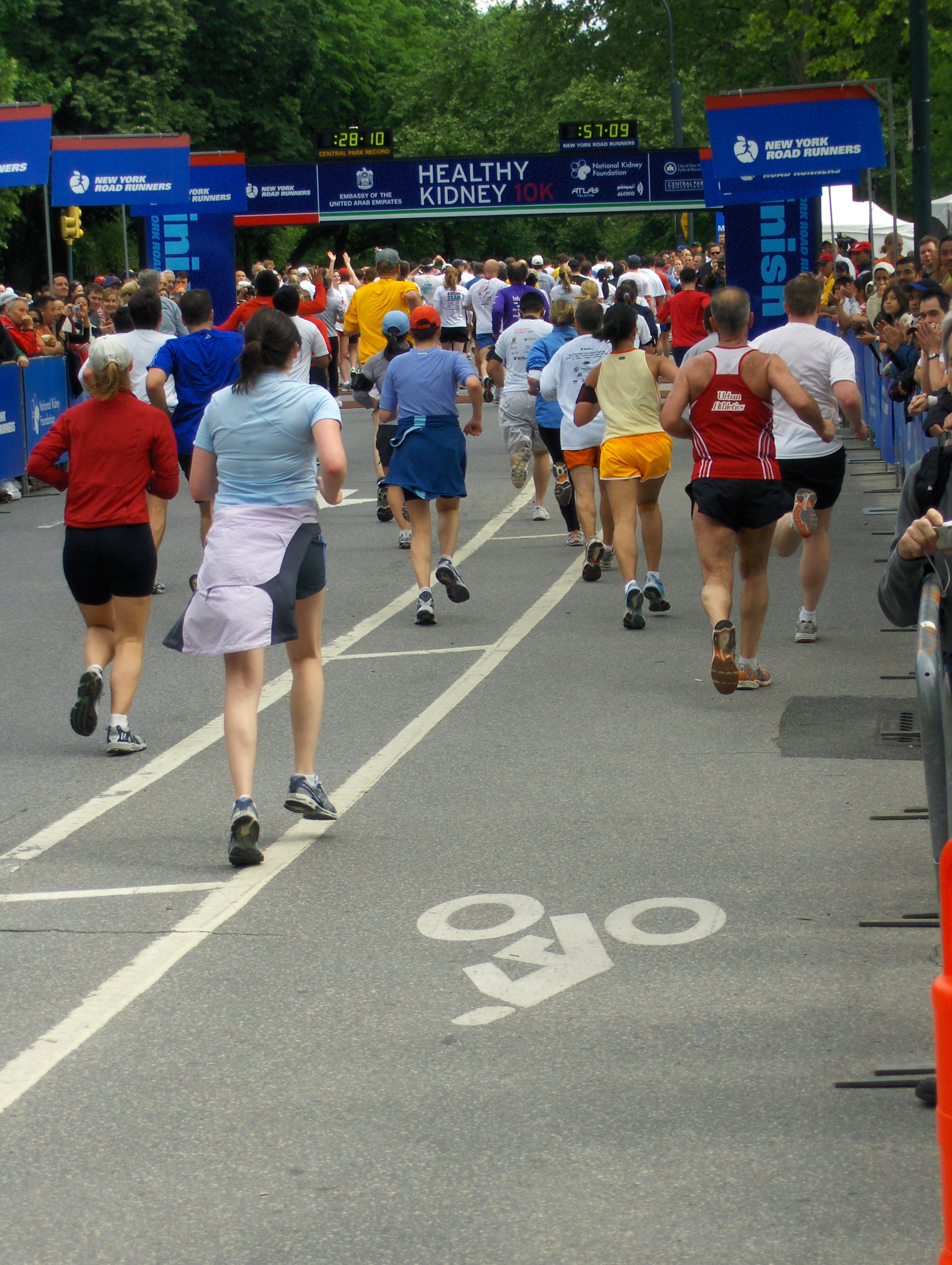
- The mass run in Central Park in 2007
- Date: Mid-May
- Location: New York City, United States
- Event type: Road
- Distance: 10 kilometers
- Established: 2005
- Website: UAE Healthy Kidney 10K

The UAE Healthy Kidney 10K was an annual road running event over 10 kilometers (6.2 miles) that took place in May in New York City in the United States. The event featured both an elite-level men's race and a general mass race for fun runners. Almost 8000 runners took part in the event each year. Its course is situated entirely within Manhattan's Central Park. It was one of two major annual 10K races held at the venue by the New York Road Runners Club, alongside the women-only New York Mini 10K.

The event was launched in May 2005 by New York Road Runners with the sponsorship of the Embassy of the United Arab Emirates. Zayed bin Sultan Al Nahyan, a former president of the country, received treatment and a kidney transplant at the Cleveland Clinic in 2000. He lived until November 2004 and the event was created in his honor soon after, with proceeds from the race going towards the National Kidney Foundation.

The course for the race was a single-looped circuit on the paths and roads within the park, comprising a little over one full lap of the park in a clockwise direction. Runners started in the south-west corner of Central Park, heading north past Sheep Meadow and The Ramble and Lake via West Park Drive. It looped southwards past Harlem Meer at the 5 km (3-mile) mark and went south on East Park Drive, passing the Reservoir and Great Lawn and Turtle Pond. The course reached the 5-mile mark just before Central Park's Bandshell. Runners turned back north after Wollman Rink, reached the 6-mile mark at the start line, then crossed the finish line near the Tavern on the Green.

The first two editions of the men's race were won by Craig Mottram. Dathan Ritzenhein became the first American to win the race and Patrick Makau became the first African the year after. Ethiopians Tadese Tola and Gebre Gebremariam ran course records under 28 minutes to win in 2009 and 2010. Phoenix Kipruto of Kenia set the course record at 27:08 minutes in 2018, the fastest record eligible 10k ever run on US soil. The event does not actively invite an elite women's field, due to the proximity of June's New York Mini 10K women's race, but elite level female athletes who are resident in the area typically take part. Ethiopia's Senbere Teferi holds the women's course record of 30:59 minutes, set in 2019.

The 2020 edition of the race was cancelled due to the COVID-19 pandemic. It was not held in 2021 either. In 2021, the NYRR were in a crisis due to COVID-19 related revenue drops, layoffs and accusations against senior management. After changes in management, NYRR planned to cull races if sponsor do not align with the organization's values. It decided in fall 2021 not to hold the UAE Healthy Kidney 10K in 2022, which may be related to the UAE's human rights record.

The event has not returned since. NYRR introduced the NYRR Manhattan 10K in 2022, which also takes place in Central Park, but in February. Other races by NYRR held in Central Park are the NYRR Joe Kleinerman 10K in January and Grete's Great Gallop, a 10-kilometer race in August commemorating Grete Waitz.

== Past winners ==
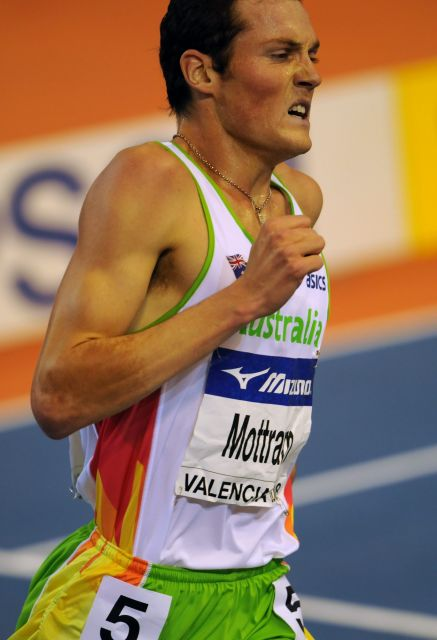
Australia's Craig Mottram won the first two races.

Key: Course record

Edition	Year	Men's winner	Time (h:m:s)	Women's winner	Time (h:m:s)
1st	2005	Craig Mottram (AUS)	28:27.3	Alemtsehay Misganaw Abate (ETH)	35:10
2nd	2006	Craig Mottram (AUS)	28:13	Alemtsehay Misganaw Abate (ETH)	34:48
3rd	2007	Dathan Ritzenhein (USA)	28:07.2	Alemtsehay Misganaw Abate (ETH)	35:31
4th	2008	Patrick Makau Musyoki (KEN)	28:18.4	Aziza Aliyu Abate (ETH)	33:32
5th	2009	Tadese Tola (ETH)	27:48	Aziza Aliyu Abate (ETH)	33:38
6th	2010	Gebre Gebremariam (ETH)	27:42	Bizunesh Deba (ETH)	33:09
7th	2011	Leonard Patrick Komon (KEN)	27:35	Bizunesh Deba (ETH)	33:39
8th	2012	Daniele Meucci (ITA)	28:28	Bekelech Bedada (ETH)	34:54
9th	2013	Leonard Patrick Komon (KEN)	27:58	Aziza Aliyu Abate (ETH)	34:34
10th	2014	Stephen Sambu (KEN)	27:39	Joyce Chepkirui (KEN)	31:17
11th	2015	Ben True (USA)	28:13	Joyce Chepkirui (KEN)	32:33
12th	2016	Lucas Rotich (KEN)	28:29	Cynthia Limo (KEN)	31:39
13th	2017	Sam Chelanga (USA)	28:21	Mamitu Daska (ETH)	31:37
14th	2018	Rhonex Kipruto (KEN)	27:08	Buze Diriba (ETH)	32:04
15th	2019	Mathew Kimeli (KEN)	27:45	Senbere Teferi (ETH)	30:59
	2020	cancelled due to the COVID-19 pandemic			

== Race finishers ==
Year	Total	No. of men	No. of women
2020	cancelled		
2019	7,696	4,212	3,484
2018	7,474	3,978	3,496
2017	8,618	4,584	4,034
2016	8,044	4,159	3,885
2015	7,948	4,255	3,693
2014	7,976	4,112	3,864
2013	5,851	3,128	2,723
2012	7,918	4,181	3,737
2011	7,564	3,920	3,644
2010	7,839	4,113	3,726
2009	7,967	4,178	3,789
2008	6,273	3,438	2,835
2007	5,418	3,087	2,331
2006	4,753	2,589	2,164
2005	4,146	2,335	1,811
