= Sharon Cherop =

Kenyan long-distance runner (born 1984)

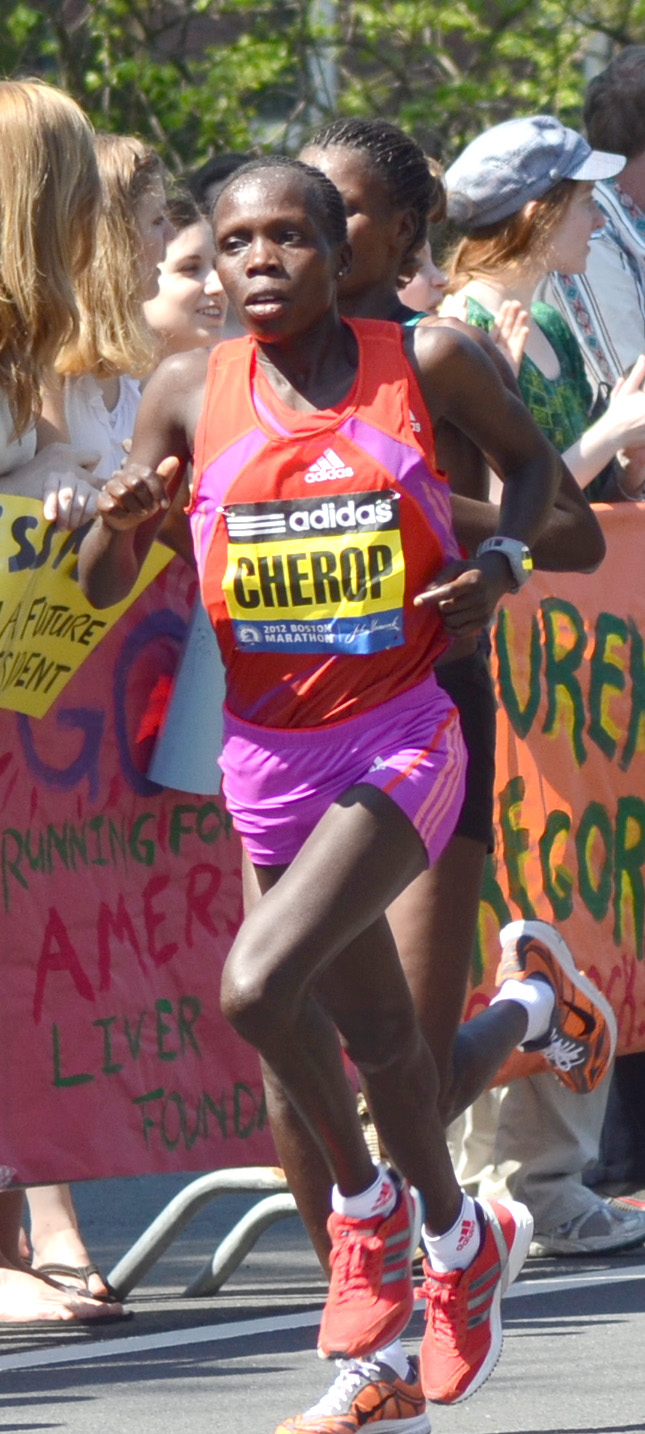
- Cherop at the half-way point of the 2012 Boston Marathon

Medal record

Representing Kenya

Women's athletics

World Championships
Bronze medal – third place	2011 Daegu	Marathon

Sharon Jemutai Cherop (born 16 March 1984) is a Kenyan long-distance runner who specialises in the marathon. She won a bronze medal at the age of sixteen in the 5000 metres at the World Junior Championships. She was the bronze medal winner in the marathon at the 2011 World Championships in Athletics and won the Boston Marathon in 2012.

After her junior medals, it was not until 2010 that she enjoyed senior level success. She made her marathon debut at the Twin Cities Marathon (coming third) and won her first marathons in 2010, first at the Hamburg Marathon and then at the Toronto Waterfront Marathon, which she won in 2:22:42 for the fastest marathon time on Canadian soil. Her personal best of 2:22:39 was set at the 2012 Dubai Marathon.

== Career ==
=== Early competition ===
Cherop grew up in a family of cattle-raisers in the Marakwet District of Kenya. She and all three of her siblings took up athletics at a young age. She ran for her school, Tirap Primary School, and began competing at province level at age 13. She was inspired by Catherine Ndereba, who lived locally, and Evans Rutto (another local marathoner) promised to help her if she performed well.

Cherop's first major competition was the 1999 All-Africa Games at the age of 15, but she did not make the podium, coming in fourth place. She was the bronze medallist over 5000 metres at the 2000 World Junior Championships in Athletics, finishing behind Dorcus Inzikuru and Meseret Defar. She started training with Sing'ore Girls, under running coach Boniface Tiren, and worked alongside other promising young runners, including future world champions Janeth Jepkosgei and Vivian Cheruiyot. A knee injury cut short her running season in 2001.

At the Discovery Kenya Great Rift Cross Country in January 2002 she took third place in the senior race behind race winner Joan Jepkorir Aiyabei. She also had national success on the track, winning the 5000 m at the 2004 Athletics Kenya meet. At the Kenya Police Cross Country Championships in January 2005 she took third place in the 8 km race behind Olympic medallist Isabella Ochichi and Cross Country medallist Jane Gakunyi.

She entered the half marathon section of the Nairobi Marathon in October 2005 and she was runner-up behind Lineth Chepkirui. She returned to the cross country running circuit a month later and was third at one of the AK meetings. She took part in the inaugural Shoe4Africa Women's 10km race in Iten and ran a personal best of 36:02 to take second behind Doris Changeywo. The 21-year-old Cherop had begun training with a prominent group of road athletes, including Chicago Marathon winner Evans Rutto and Boston champion Lameck Aguta. She began focusing more on road competitions and was third at the Tegla Loroupe Peace Race at the end of the year. She was fifth at the 15th Discovery Kenya Cross Country Championships in January 2007.

=== Marathon debut ===
Cherop made her debut on the American road running circuit later that year, starting with a win at the News and Sentinel Half Marathon in a time of 1:12:26, and then a fourth-place finish in a personal best of 1:10:21 at the Philadelphia Distance Run. In October she made her marathon debut at the Twin Cities Marathon in Minneapolis-Saint Paul. She led alongside Svetlana Ponomarenko for most of the race but she was overhauled by the Russian and Alena Vinitskaya in the final mile, having to settle for third place with a time of 2:38:45. She took on the classic distance for a second time in April 2008 at the Country Music Marathon in Nashville, where Ponomarenko again took top honours while Cherop (15 years her junior) finished in fourth place. At the Azalea Trail Run in May she set a 10K best of 32:43 for fourth place.

Her first marathon of 2009 came at the Nairobi Marathon and she knocked several minutes off her personal best with a run of 2:33:53 for third place. In the women's 15 km race at the Baringo Half Marathon in December 2009 she engaged in a race-long battle for the lead against Agnes Kiprop, although she faded in the final stages and was runner-up in 52:01 minutes. The following year she entered the Hamburg Marathon and ran a solo effort to win the race and a significant personal best of 2:28:38 – over five minutes quicker than her previous time. "It was hard running alone for so long, but I concentrated well", she said of her first major win in Europe. This mark did not stand for long as she improved again at the Toronto Waterfront Marathon in September 2010, where she fell over mid-race but recovered to hold off Tirfi Tsegaye to win the race in a time of 2:22:42 – the fastest ever run in Canada, beating Romania's Lidia Șimon's all-comers record set at the 2001 World Championships in Edmonton.

A third-place finish at the 2011 Boston Marathon brought Cherop a place on the national marathon team. She went on to take the bronze medal in the marathon at the 2011 World Championships in Athletics – her first international senior medal. Her placing also formed a Kenyan podium sweep with Edna Kiplagat and Priscah Jeptoo, which was a first for a world-level marathon competition. In November she set a personal best at the Delhi Half Marathon, coming second behind Lucy Wangui in a time of 1:07:08 hours.

She won the 2012 Kenyan Armed Forces Cross Country in January, holding off a challenge from Hellen Obiri. This served as preparation for the Dubai Marathon later that month and in a quick race she finished seventh but knocked three seconds off her best with a run of 2:22:39 hours. Three months later she ran at the 2012 Boston Marathon and defeated Jemima Sumgong in a sprint finish to win the race a time of 2:31:50 hours (slowed by warm temperatures). In spite of this, she was not selected for the Kenyan Olympic marathon team that year. She tried for a spot in the 10,000 m, but came ninth at the national championships. She ran a 10 km best of 32:03 minutes for third at the BAA 10K then went on to take wins at the Philadelphia Half Marathon and Turin Marathon.

== Achievements ==
- All results regarding marathon, unless stated otherwise

Year	Competition	Venue	Position	Event	Notes
Representing Kenya
2000	World Junior Championships	Santiago, Chile	3rd	5000m	16:23.73
2007	Twin Cities Marathon	Minneapolis, USA	3rd	Marathon	2:38:45
2009	Nairobi Marathon	Nairobi, Kenya	3rd	Marathon	2:33:53
2010	Hamburg Marathon	Hamburg, Germany	1st	Marathon	2:28:38
2010	Toronto Waterfront Marathon	Toronto, Canada	1st	Marathon	2:22:42
2011	Boston Marathon	Boston, USA	3rd	Marathon	2:22:42
2012	Boston Marathon	Boston, USA	1st	Marathon	2:31:50
