= 2010 African Championships in Athletics – Men's 10,000 metres =

2010 footrace

The men's 10,000 metres at the 2010 African Championships in Athletics were held on July 28.

== Results ==
Rank	Name	Nationality	Time	Notes
1st place, gold medalist(s)	Wilson Kiprop	Kenya	27:32.91	
2nd place, silver medalist(s)	Moses Ndiema Kipsiro	Uganda	27:33.37	
3rd place, bronze medalist(s)	Geoffrey Mutai	Kenya	27:33.83	
4	Mathew Kisorio	Kenya	27:56.71	
5	Yakob Jarso	Ethiopia	28:20.66	
6	Stephen Kiprotich	Uganda	28:33.85	
7	Fabiano Joseph	Tanzania	28:40.53	
8	Teklemariam Medhin	Eritrea	28:50.63	
9	Bernard Bizimana	Burundi	30:01.78	
10	Daudi Joseph	Tanzania	30:06.22	
11	Goumaneh Omar Doualeh	Djibouti	31:53.08	
	Yetwale Kende	Ethiopia	DNF	
	Sileshi Sihine	Ethiopia	DNF	
	Linos Chitali	Zambia	DNS	
	Dieudonné Disi	Rwanda	DNS	
	Oliver Irabaruta	Burundi	DNS	
	Marko Joseph	Tanzania	DNS	
	Geoffrey Kusuro	Uganda	DNS	
