= Caroline Rotich =

Kenyan long-distance runner

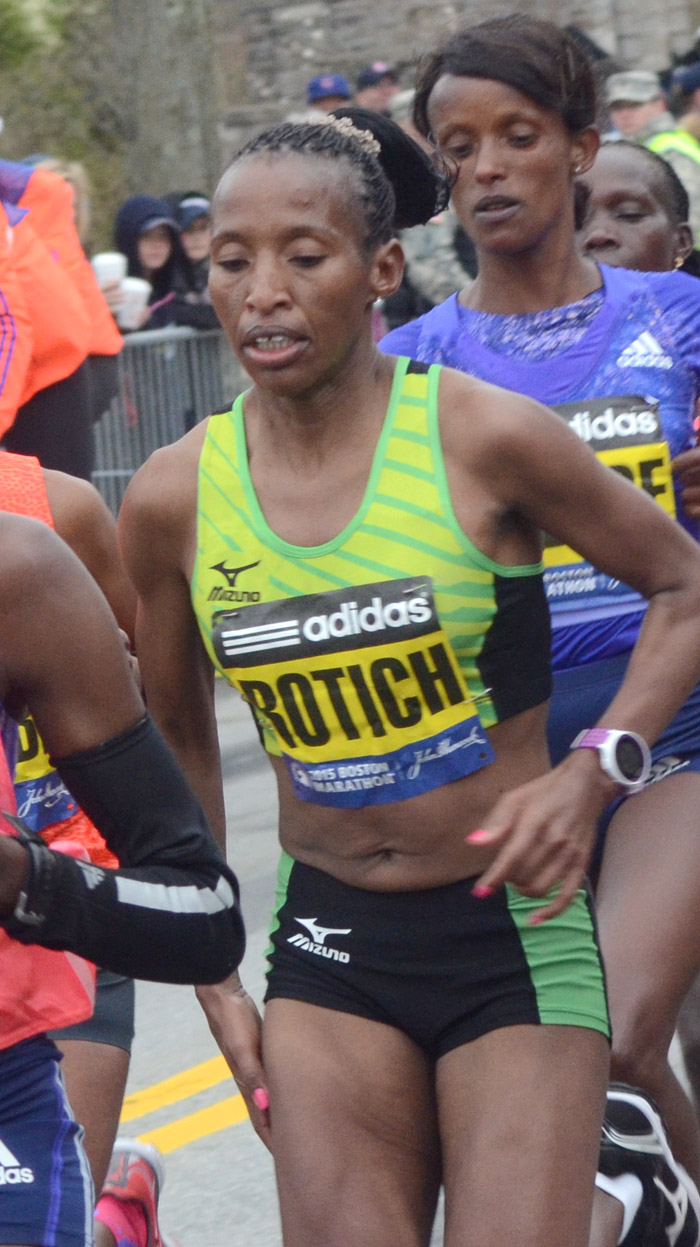
- Caroline Rotich, female winner of 2015 Boston Marathon approaching halfway point

Personal information
- Nationality: Kenyan; United States
- Born: May 13, 1984 (age 41) Nyahururu, Kenya
- Education: Graduated from Sendai Ikuei Gakuen High School

Sport
- Sport: Long-distance running

Caroline Rotich (born 13 May 1984) is a Kenyan-American long-distance runner who competes in half marathon and marathon races. She has won the Las Vegas Marathon, New York Half Marathon and the Boston Marathon. She represented Kenya at the World Championships in Athletics in 2011 and has personal bests of 2:23:22 for the marathon and 1:09:09 for the half marathon.

On 3 October 2023, Rotich transferred her eligibility to represent the United States in international competitions.

== Biography ==
Born in Nyahururu, Rotich gained a sports scholarship in Japan at Sendai Ikuei Gakuen High School – an institution known for long-distance running (attended by athletes such as Samuel Wanjiru). She began competing in Europe after graduating and won the 2004 Diecimiglia del Garda in Italy and the Semi-marathon Marvejols-Mende in 2005. She made her debut over the marathon distance in 2006 at the Nairobi Marathon, finishing in eleventh place. She moved to the United States to train and became based there full-time.

In May 2008, Rotich won the Ogden Newspapers 20K and came fourth at the Bay to Breakers 12K. A month later she ran a half marathon best of 74:40 minutes for second at Grandma's Marathon and won the Hospital Hill Half Marathon. She began training with Ryan Bolton's Harambee Running Club at the start of 2009 had top three finishes in the half marathon at the Yuengling, Cobán, Spiriti of Columbus and Grandma's Marathon races. A career breakthrough came with a win at the Las Vegas Marathon, where she crossed the line in a time of 2:29:47 hours and won "Battle of the Sexes" race against the men.

In 2010, Rotich set a new 10K best of 32:43 minutes at the New York Mini 10K, she was runner-up at the Crim 10-Miler and won the Grandma's half marathon and Boston Half Marathon. She improved her marathon best by one second at the New York City Marathon, taking eighth place. She worked her way up into the top of the Kenyan rankings in 2011. She ran a personal best and course record of 68:52 minutes to win the New York Half Marathon, then came fourth at the 2011 Boston Marathon with a time of 2:24:26 on the downhill course, which gained her selection for the Kenyan national team. She won the Bix 7-Miler in July then finished 29th in the marathon at the 2011 World Championships in Athletics. She ended the year with a personal best run of 2:27:06 hours at the 2011 New York City Marathon.

Rotich began 2012 at the New York Half Marathon, but did not defend her title and came eighth. She was among the leaders halfway through the 2012 Boston Marathon, but dropped out after 30 km. She won the Crim 10-Miler with a personal best run of 53:43 minutes and completed her first marathon at the 2012 Chicago Marathon, where her time of 2:23:22 hours was enough for fifth position.

In 2013, Rotich began by winning again the NYC Half Marathon just ahead of Diane Nukuri. A win at the Prague Marathon followed in May.

Rotich won the 2015 Boston Marathon on April 20, with a winning time of 2:24:55. That November, she placed 10th in 2:33:19 TCS New York City Marathon.

In 2022 Rotich set a new personal best time in the 10K distance at the New York Mini 10K. She finished 8th overall with a time of 31:30.

== Personal bests ==
- 10 kilometres – 31:30 (2022)
- Half marathon – 1:09:09 (2013)
- Marathon – 2:23:22 (2012)

== Legacy ==
The New Mexico state legislature declared 28 February 2017 as the “Caroline Rotich Day” in recognition of her running accomplishments.
