= Renato Canova =

Italian athletics coach (born 1944)

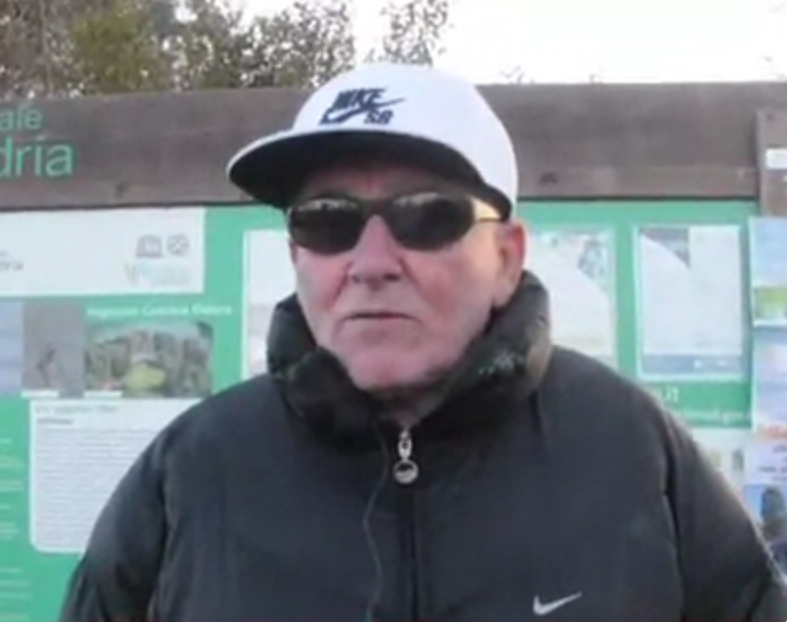
- Canova in a 2018 Italian television interview

Personal information
- Nationality: Italian
- Born: 21 December 1944 (age 81) Turin, Italy

Renato Canova (born 21 December 1944) is an Italian athletics coach. He is known to have coached numerous athletes who have won medals in top international middle- and long-distance competitions, and who have set world records.

Over 50 of Canova's athletes have won Olympic or World Championship medals.

== Career ==
Prior to becoming a coach, Canova used to be an active athlete, competing in various disciplines, but realized he did not have the talent to become a professional athlete.

From 1975 to 1985, Canova was the national Italian coach of multi-events.

In 1987, Canova began training Italian middle and long distance athletes. Here he trained, among others, Maria Curatolo and Ornella Ferrara. During this time, he worked with Luciano Gigliotti, who was responsible for the male middle and long distance athletes. In 1996, in addition to coaching Italian runners, Canova also began training Kenyan athletes in Italy. He justified this by saying that at that time the level of Italian runners was falling because there weren't enough new athletes coming up. In 1998 he traveled to Kenya for the first time.

Beginning in 2003, Canova became the national coach of the Qatari national athletics team. In 2004, one of Canova's athletes, Stephen Cherono, changed his citizenship from Kenyan to Qatari. This position enabled him to train more intensively with his athletes, who were of Qatari nationality but most of whom came from Kenya. He relocated to Iten, located at approximately 2,400 m (7,870 ft), for most of the year because he considered the training conditions there to be most suitable. Due to disagreements with the association, he gave up this activity in 2011, which the year after the 2010 Asian Games, when he resigned and returned to Italy. After Canova rejected an offer from the Chinese Athletics Association in 2011, he trained athletes such as Anna and Lisa Hahner.

At the 2012 Summer Olympics, one of Canova's athletes won a silver medal (Abel Kirui in the marathon), and two of Canova's athletes won bronze medals (Wilson Kipsang in the marathon and Thomas Longosiwa in the 5000 m).

In September 2013, an agreement was reached with the Chinese Athletics Association, where Canova was appointed as the national head coach for middle- and long-distances. Canova agreed to work with the association until the 2016 Olympic Games. However, he did not manage to bring about the desired turnaround for the Chinese runners. He attributed this to China's poorly organized and overly regional system. At the beginning of November 2015, he resigned from this position, in spite of having a contract until the end of 2016.

At the beginning of 2016, Canova returned to Kenya to create a new running group.

European record holder Julien Wanders has been trained by Canova since 2020.

== Coaching philosophy ==
Canova's training system is based on increasing race-specific endurance. His fundamental period begins with high volume and low-intensity running along with uphill sprints and technical exercises. During the special period, training sessions move toward speeds that are closer to the athlete's goal race pace but still relatively far away. In the final specific period, all sessions focus on speeds only slightly slower and faster than race pace but with a goal of performing more and more work in each session. Throughout the training cycle, more and more recovery sessions are included as hard sessions become longer and more fatiguing. Because of this, Canova has very rarely used weekly or bi-weekly training cycles in favor of adapting to the effect of each individual session.

Canova has lectured for World Athletics (formerly IAAF), speaking about training methodology.

Canova believes that a doping agent such as erythropoietin (EPO) would not work on his top athletes because pure aerobic training could increase the capacity of blood in their cardiovascular system to such an extent that EPO would no longer would be beneficial. If this were not the case, EPO could have an effect, but this would not be the case in its athletes. Canova attributes this to the fact that these athletes spend their entire lives at high altitudes.

Canova sees the reason for the success of his athletes in their training and in their talent and motivation. He maintains that all the athletes he knows and trains are clean. He attributes the fact that the Europeans and Americans fall in level compared to the East African runners to the different approaches to training. Non-African athletes would not train intensively enough.

== Criticism ==
Canova is often confronted with criticism that his athletes are doped. These claims are often attributed to doping bans for individual athletes who were trained by him, along with reports of widespread doping in relation to running in Kenya. Canova commented that no fewer than ten doping tests were carried out on his athletes every week.

== Personal life ==
Canova was married to Daniela Gregorutti, who was a middle-distance runner and was trained by him. Gregorutti died in February 2021.
