= Tadese Tola =

Ethiopian long-distance runner

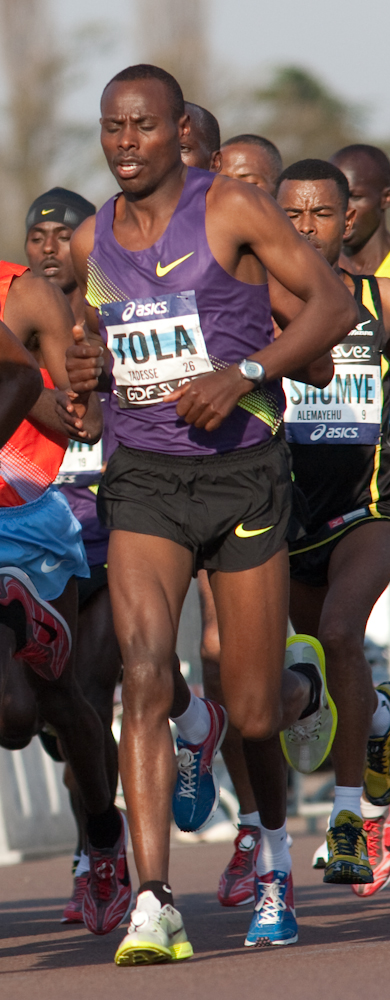
- Tola at the 2010 Paris Marathon

Medal record

Men's athletics

Representing Ethiopia

World Championships
Bronze medal – third place	2013 Moscow	Marathon

All-Africa Games
Silver medal – second place	2007 Algiers	10,000 m

World Road Running Championships
Bronze medal – third place	2006 Debrecen	Team

Tadese Tola (born 31 October 1987) is an Ethiopian long-distance runner. He has represented Ethiopia at World championship level in cross country, road running, and on the track.

He made his first impact in 2006, helping the Ethiopian teams to bronze medals in the junior race at the 2006 IAAF World Cross Country Championships and the 20 km race at the 2006 IAAF World Road Running Championships. He won a silver medal at the All-Africa Games in the 10,000 metres and ran at the 2007 World Championships.

He has largely focused on road running since 2008, scoring wins at the New York City Half Marathon and San Silvestre Vallecana. He made his marathon debut in 2009 at the Chicago Marathon and won on his second attempt at the Paris Marathon. He was the bronze medallist in the marathon at the 2013 World Championships in Athletics.

== Life ==
Tola was born on 31 October 1987 in Addis Ababa.

== Career ==
Tola competed as a junior at the 2006 IAAF World Cross Country Championships and helped the Ethiopian team to a junior team bronze with his tenth-place finish. At the 2006 African Championships he finished fifth in the 10,000 metres with a personal best time of 28:15.16 minutes. He finished seventh at the 2006 IAAF World Road Running Championships, thereby helping Ethiopia to a bronze medal in the team competition.

He was the 2007 winner of the Cross Internacional de Venta de Baños in Spain, and Tola went on to finish seventh at the 2007 IAAF World Cross Country Championships in Mombasa. He was Ethiopia's best finisher in the competition, in which reigning champion Kenenisa Bekele dropped out from exhaustion. A week after the IAAF World Cross Country Championships, he won the Cherry Blossom Ten Mile Run in Washington DC. On track, he won the silver at the 2007 All-Africa Games in the 10,000 m in July, but only managed 13th in the final at the 2007 World Championships in Athletics. He had much success on the American road circuit in 2008, winning the Falmouth Road Race and then going to take first place in the 2008 New York City Half Marathon with a time of 1:00:58. He closed the year with a win at the San Silvestre Vallecana in Spain.

He ran at the 2009 IAAF World Cross Country Championships and finished 17th overall. He broke the course record at the Healthy Kidney 10K run in Central Park in May that year – finishing with a time of 27:48 minutes, he beat Dathan Ritzenhein's previous record by 20 seconds to win the Zayed Bonus prize of $20,000. Tola was disqualified from the 2009 Peachtree Road Race for elbowing competitor Boaz Cheboiywo in the final 30 metres of the race. Tola was the fourth-place finisher before being disqualified. Tola's agent later disputed the disqualification, saying that Tola's actions were unintentional. He followed an appeal, but it was received too late for review. He defended his title at the NYC Half Marathon, finishing a minute ahead of the rest of the field. He ran in his first marathon at the 2009 Chicago Marathon, running 2:15:48 to take tenth place.

Tadese Tola began 2010 with a second-place finish at the Ras Al Khaimah Half Marathon, setting a personal best of 59:49 on the way. He significantly improved his marathon best in April at the Paris Marathon to win the race over more-favoured opposition in a time of 2:06:41 – establishing him as the fifth-fastest ever Ethiopian over the distance. He took the top honours at the Portugal Half Marathon in September, beating Josphat Menjo and Francis Kiprop to win in 1:01:05. He was satisfied to have beaten such competition over the distance after finishing second in Ras Al Khaimah. He competed at the Frankfurt Marathon in October and improved his best for the distance by ten seconds, although he was beaten into second place by Wilson Kipsang. He was one of the favourites entering the 2011 Eindhoven Marathon, but he finished fourth in a time of 2:07:13 hours while the relatively unknown Jafred Chirchir Kipchumba won the race.

Tadese achieved a personal best time in January at the 2012 Dubai Marathon, knocking over a minute off his previous time with a run of 2:05:10 hours. However, he managed only fifth place due to the high quality of the field, where the winner Ayele Abshero became the fourth fastest man ever. He was expected to perform well at the Ottawa 10K, but finished in fourth more than a minute behind Geoffrey Mutai. History repeated at the Eindhoven Marathon, where he entered as favourite but finished in fourth place. A personal best of 2:04:49 hours came in his first race of 2013 at the Dubai Marathon, but the quick pace of the race left him in third place, four seconds behind winner Lelisa Desisa.

He was the favourite at the 2013 Paris Marathon, but finished as runner-up as he was unable to respond to Peter Some's late surge. He made a concerted attempt to win the world title at the 2013 World Championships in Athletics, leading for large portions of the marathon race, but eventually faded to third place. Following this he took down Taisuke Kodama's long-lasting course record at the Beijing Marathon, running 2:07:16 hours to win the race and beat the 27-year-old mark.

== Personal bests ==
- 5000 metres – 13:18.82 min (2007)
- 10,000 metres – 27:04.89 min (2007)
- Half marathon – 59:49 min (2010)
- Marathon – 2:04:49 hrs (2013)

== Competition record ==
Year	Competition	Venue	Position	Event
2006	World Cross Country Championships	Fukuoka, Japan	10th	Individual junior race
2006	World Cross Country Championships	Fukuoka, Japan	3rd	Team junior race
2006	African Championships in Athletics	Bambous, Mauritius	5th	10,000 m
2006	World Road Running Championships	Debrecen, Hungary	7th	Individual 20 km
2006	World Road Running Championships	Debrecen, Hungary	3rd	Team 20 km
2007	World Cross Country Championships	Mombasa, Kenya	7th	Individual
2007	All-Africa Games	Algiers, Algeria	2nd	10,000 m
2007	World Championships in Athletics	Osaka, Japan	13th	10,000 m
2009	World Cross Country Championships	Amman, Jordan	17th	Individual
2013	World Championships	Moscow, Russia	3rd	Marathon

=== Road race wins ===
- 2008 Falmouth Road Race
- 2008 New York City Half Marathon
- 2008 San Silvestre Vallecana
- 2009 Healthy Kidney 10K
- 2009 New York City Half Marathon
- 2010 Paris Marathon
- 2014 Orlen Warsaw Marathon
- 2016 Bogotá Half Marathon
