= B.A.A. 10K =

Annual road running event

- The logo for the B.A.A. 10K
- Date: June 22, 2025
- Location: Boston, Massachusetts, United States
- Event type: Road
- Distance: 10 kilometers
- Primary sponsor: Brigham and Women's Hospital (Since 2016)
- Established: 2011
- Website: Official website

The B.A.A. 10K is an annual road running event for men and women over 10 kilometers (6.2 mi) that takes place in June in Boston in the United States. A total of 3040 people finished the race at the inaugural edition.

The B.A.A. 10K is one of two major annual races that cover the 10 kilometer distance in the city, alongside the Tufts Health Plan 10K for women, which is held in October.

== History ==
First organized by the Boston Athletic Association (B.A.A.) in 2011, the event represented a further expansion of the group's road running calendar; building on the long-running Boston Marathon, the B.A.A. Half Marathon and B.A.A. 5K were launched in 2001 and 2009 respectively. Unlike the association's more prominent competitions, the 10K does not require that participants achieve a qualifying time to enter the race. The race has a mix of amateur and professional, elite level runners, and a total prize pot of US$30,000 is available.

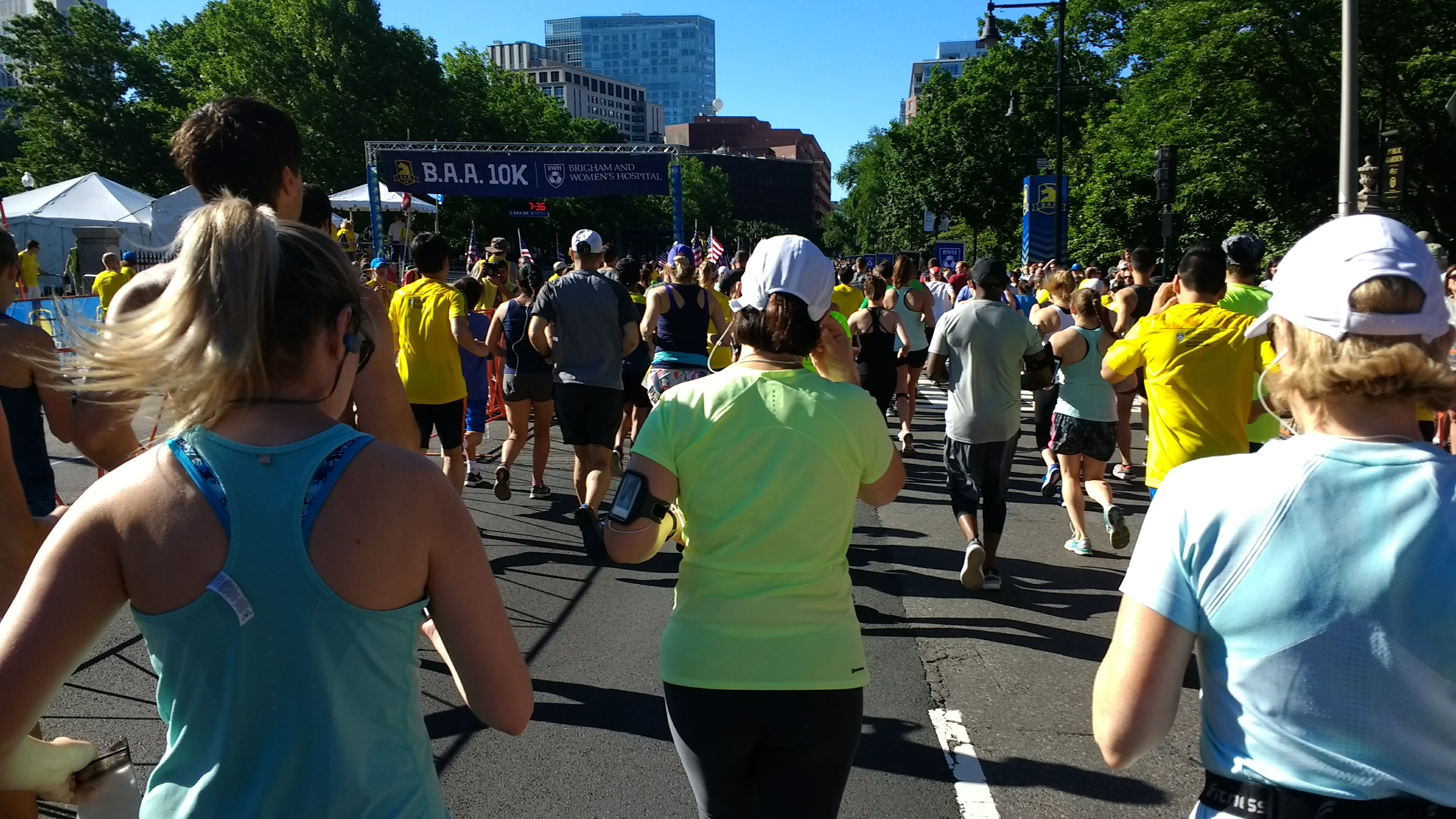
The starting line of the 2017 BAA 10K in Boston.

The course for the race is set in Boston's Back Bay neighborhood. It follows a closely looped format, heading west to east with Charles Street acting as both the start and finish point of the race. The race begins by following the perimeter of the Public Garden before heading west along Commonwealth Avenue and Bay State Road. After reaching the halfway point near the intersection with Babcock Street, the course loops back on itself and runs along Commonwealth Avenue until the finish line on Charles Street. The course passes city landmarks including the Cheers Beacon Hill bar and the campus of Boston University.

The men's and women's winners of the 2011 Boston Marathon ran in the first B.A.A. 10K and both won their respective categories. Geoffrey Mutai won the men's race in 27 minutes 19 seconds (a state record), while Caroline Kilel crossed the line in 31:58 to win the women's section. Mutai defended his title a year later while Kim Smith set a women's record of 31:36.

The B.A.A. 10K is one of two major annual races over the distance in the city, alongside the Tufts Health Plan 10K for women, which is held in October.

The 2017 race was run under sunny skies with a temperature of 65 degrees at the start of the race with rising humidity for the 8,143 registered runners. The men's division was won by Daniel Chebii in 27:58 and the women's division winner was Joan Chelimo in 31:24. Both runners took home the $10,000 prize for winning their respective division.

The 2020 edition of the race was postponed to 2020.11.22 due to the coronavirus pandemic.

== Past winners ==
Key: Course record

Edition	Year	Men's winner	Time (m:s)	Women's winner	Time (m:s)
1st	2011	Geoffrey Mutai (KEN)	27:19 ^{†}	Caroline Kilel (KEN)	31:58
2nd	2012	Geoffrey Mutai (KEN)	27:29	Kim Smith (NZL)	31:36
3rd	2013	Stephen Sambu (KEN)	28:06	Mamitu Daska (ETH)	31:45
4th	2014	Stephen Sambu (KEN)	27:25	Mamitu Daska (ETH)	31:04
5th	2015	Daniel Salel (KEN)	28:09	Mary Wacera (KEN)	32:07
6th	2016	Daniel Chebii (KEN)	27:55	Shalane Flanagan (USA)	30:52
7th	2017	Daniel Chebii (KEN)	27:58	Joan Chelimo (KEN)	31:24
8th	2018	Gabriel Geay (TAN)	28:24	Mary Wacera (KEN)	31:55
9th	2019	David Bett (KEN)	28:08	Fancy Chemutai (KEN)	30:36
10th	2022	Leonard Korir (USA)	28:00	Keira D'Amato (USA)	31:17
11th	2023	Gabriel Geay (TAN)	27:49	Hellen Obiri (KEN)	31:21
12th	2024	Sabastian Sawe (KEN)	27:42	Melknat Wudu (ETH)	31:15

- ^{†} = Also a state record for Massachusetts
