= Kim Smith (runner) =

New Zealand runner (born 1981)

Kimberley Smith
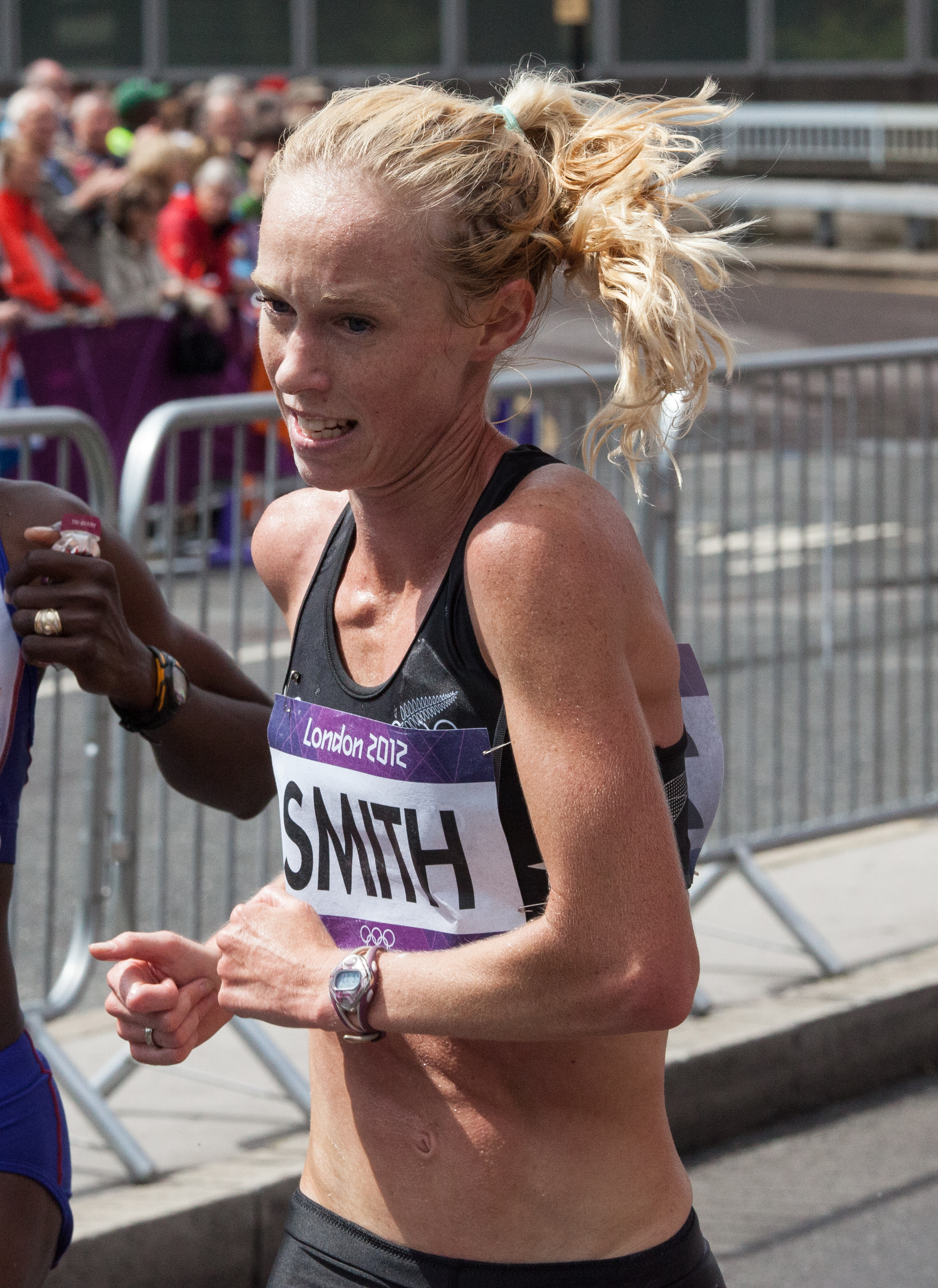
- Smith in the marathon at the 2012 Olympics in London

Personal information
- Born: 19 November 1981 (age 44) Papakura, Auckland, New Zealand
- Height: 1.66 m (5 ft 5 1/2 in)
- Weight: 48 kg (106 lb)

Sport
- Country: New Zealand
- Sport: Athletics
- Event: Marathon
- Club: New Balance
- Coached by: Ray Treacy

Kimberley Smith (born 19 November 1981) is a New Zealand middle-distance and long-distance runner who retired in 2016.

== Life ==
She is a 2005 graduate of Providence College (previously at Auckland's King's College. She first started running with Papakura Harriers. Smith won the 2004 NCAA Women's Individual Cross Country Championship. She won three NCAA individual titles in indoor track (5,000 metres and 3,000 metres) and outdoor track (5,000 metres) during the 2003–04 season. Her four NCAA individual championships are the most by any runner in Providence College history. In 2004, she won the Honda Sports Award as the nation's best female collegiate track and field athlete, then in 2005 won the Honda Sports Award as the nation's best female collegiate cross country runner.

She set a national record in the marathon with a run at the 2010 London Marathon—she finished eighth in the women's race and recorded a time of 2:25:21. Her result was upgraded to sixth after Russian athletes Liliya Shobukhova and Inga Abitova were removed from the results for doping. She ran the fastest half marathon by a woman on United States soil when she won the 2011 Rock 'n’ Roll Mardi Gras Half Marathon in 1:07:36. Smith was leading the women's field of the 2011 Boston Marathon by 50 seconds at the halfway point, but injured her leg at mile 15 and was forced to drop from the race with roughly seven miles remaining. She ran at the inaugural B.A.A. 10K in June and came second behind the Boston Marathon winner Caroline Kilel. Smith established herself as the seventh-fastest runner ever at the Rock 'n' Roll Philadelphia Half Marathon, where she improved upon Meseret Defar's course record with a time of 1:07:11. She entered the 2011 New York City Marathon two months later and finished in fifth place with a time of 2:25:46. She finished 6th in Yokohama Marathon on 18 November 2012 in 2:27

At the 2012 New York City Half Marathon she was leading alongside Firehiwot Dado before finally finishing second behind the Ethiopian. She ran a course record at the Boston 10K, beating reigning champion Kilel with a run of 31:36 minutes. She placed fifteenth in the 2012 Olympic marathon in London and won the Boston Half Marathon to claim the BAA Distance Medley jackpot of $100,000. In September 2012 she married fellow runner Patrick Tarpy. They have two children.

Smith was runner-up to Olympic marathon champion Tiki Gelana at the 2013 Kagawa Marugame Half Marathon.

In 2016, her last year of professional running, she finished third at the Stanford Invitational 5K in 15:32.

Smith was contracted by New Balance and still holds many New Zealand national records. She also holds the Oceanian records for the 5000 metres (indoors) and 10,000 metres. She currently resides in Providence, Rhode Island.

== Achievements ==
Year	Competition	Venue	Position	Event
Representing New Zealand
2004	Olympic Games	Athens, Greece	20th	5,000 m
2005	World Cross Country Championships	Saint-Étienne, France	12th	Long race
2005	World Championships	Helsinki, Finland	15th	10,000 m
2005	World Athletics Final	Monte Carlo, Monaco	7th	5000 m
2005	Universiade	İzmir, Turkey	1st	5000 m
2006	World Cup	Athens, Greece	4th	5000 m
2007	World Championships	Osaka, Japan	4th	10,000 m
2008	World Indoor Championships	Valencia, Spain	6th	3000 m
2008	Olympic Games	Beijing, China	7th	10,000 m
2009	World Cross Country Championships	Amman, Jordan	13th	Senior race
2009	World Championships	Berlin, Germany	8th	10,000 m
2009	World Half Marathon Championships	Birmingham, England	7th	Half marathon
2010	London Marathon	London, England	6th	Marathon
2010	New York City Marathon	New York City, United States	4th	Marathon
2011	New York City Marathon	New York City, United States	5th	Marathon
2012	Olympic Games	London, England	15th	Marathon

== Personal bests ==
=== Outdoor ===
Distance	Time	Date	Location
1500 metres	4:11.25	26 June 2004	Waltham, MA
2000 metres	5:47:10	13 January 2007	Hamilton, NZL
3000 metres	8:35.31 NR	25 July 2007	Monaco
5000 metres	14:45.93 NR	11 July 2008	Rome
5 km (road)	15:16 NR	14 April 2013	Boston
4 Miles (road)	19:38	20 June 2009	Peoria, IL
10,000 metres	30:35.54 NR	4 May 2008	Palo Alto, CA
10 km (road)	31:38	25 May 2009	London
20 km (road)	1:03:38 NR	18 September 2011	Philadelphia
Half marathon	1:07:11 NR	18 September 2011	Philadelphia
25 km (road)	1:24:15 NR	25 April 2010	London
30 km (road)	1:41:43 NR	25 April 2010	London
Marathon	2:25:21 NR	25 April 2010	London

=== Indoor ===
Distance	Time	Date	Location
One mile	4:24.14 NR	8 February 2008	Boston
3000 metres	8:38.14 NR	27 January 2007	Boston
Two miles	9:13.94	26 January 2008	Boston
5000 metres	14:39.89 NR	27 February 2009	New York City

NR indicates a New Zealand national record
