= Buzunesh Deba =

Ethiopian long-distance runner

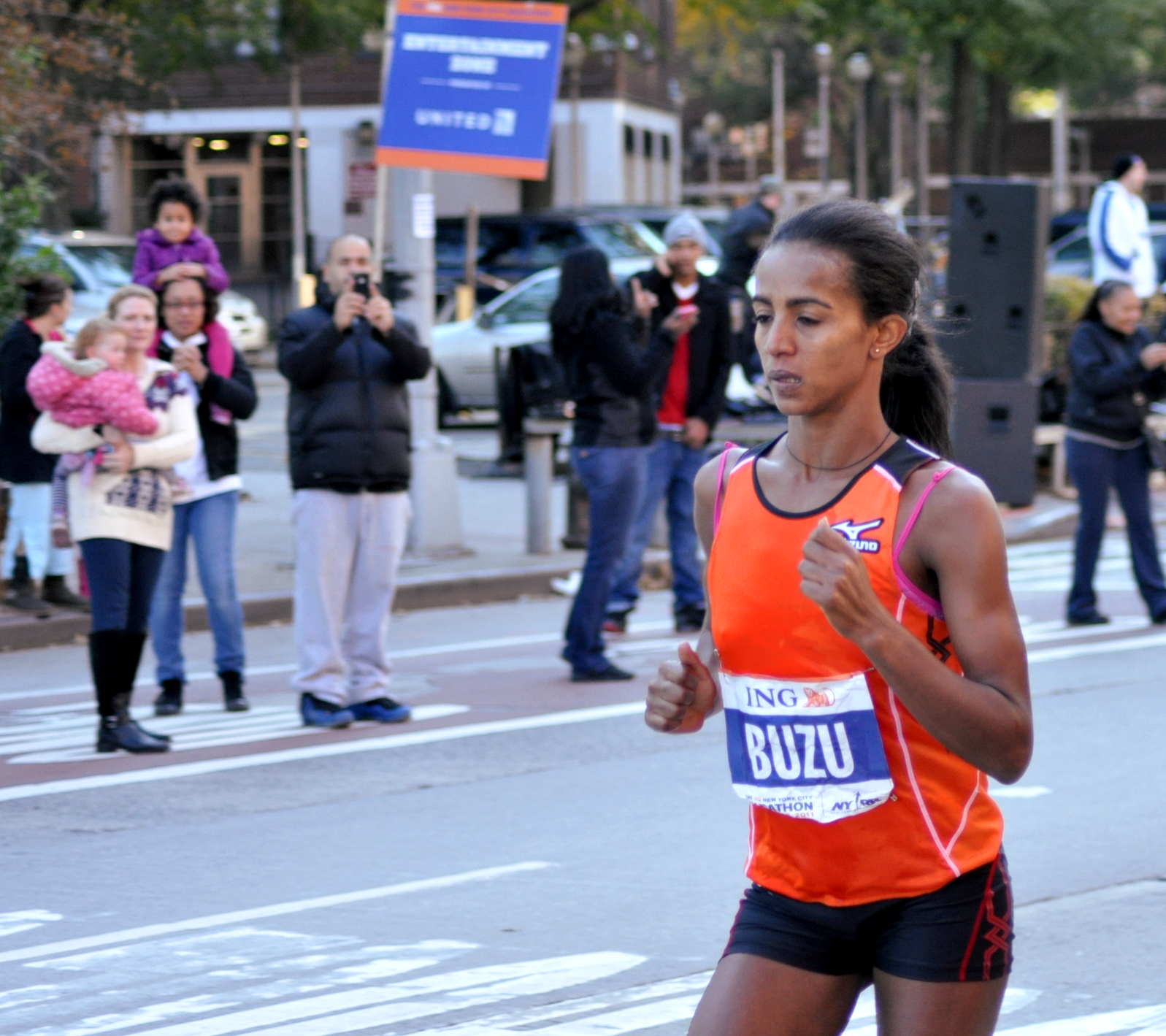

Personal information
- Born: 8 September 1987 (age 39) Ethiopia

Sport
- Country: Ethiopia

Buzunesh Deba (born 8 September 1987) is a Bronx-based Ethiopian long-distance runner. She won the 2014 Boston Marathon in her personal-best time of 2:19:59. In the race, Deba finished behind Rita Jeptoo, who was later disqualified for doping.

A prolific runner since 2009, she is a winner of the California International Marathon, San Diego Marathon, Los Angeles Marathon, Grandma's Marathon, Boston Marathon, and Twin Cities Marathon. She has finished in the top ten three times at the New York City Marathon.

== Career ==
Her first international appearance for Ethiopia came in the long race at the 2003 IAAF World Cross Country Championships, where she came 33rd overall. She competed on the track in Japan in 2004, running a best of 15:52.33 minutes for the 5000 metres, but it was another five years until she established herself as a road running specialist.

Basing herself in The Bronx, New York, alongside her fellow marathon runner and husband Worku Beyi, she began to compete in road races in the United States in 2009. She won the Fairfield Half Marathon in June and in July she was the runner-up in the women's section of the Buffalo 4-Mile Chase, That September she won the Charleston Distance Classic 15-miler and then made her debut over the marathon, winning on her first try at the Quad Cities Marathon with a time of 2:44:22 hours. Two months later she ran at the New York City Marathon and came seventh, significantly improving her best time to 2:35:54 hours. In an untraditional decision for an elite runner, she ran her third marathon in the space of three months at the California International Marathon and she won the race in a time of 2:32:17 hours.

She began 2010 with a personal best of 1:12:50 hours to win at the Naples Half Marathon and a win at the National Marathon to Fight Breast Cancer in Jacksonville Beach followed soon after. She extended her winning streak to seven straight wins by taking the women's titles at the Broad Street Run, Newport 10000, UAE Healthy Kidney 10K, Grandma's Marathon (with a personal best run of 2:31:35), and the Fairfield Half Marathon. She was tenth at the Peachtree Road Race on July 4, but returned to her winning ways at the Buffalo 4-Miler and Chris Thater Memorial 5K. Deba secured her third marathon win of the year at the Twin Cities Marathon in Minneapolis in October, running a personal best of 2:27:23 hours and beating second placed Svetlana Ponomarenko by almost eight minutes. She returned to the major race at the 2010 New York City Marathon and came tenth, although her time of 2:29:55 hours was her second run under the 2:30:00-mark. As in the previous year, she closed the season at the California Marathon and she retained her title, bringing her yearly tally to four marathon wins in five appearances.

== 2011 ==
At the beginning of 2011, Deba defeated pre-race favourite Mare Dibaba to win the Los Angeles Marathon. She took a second straight victory at the Newport 10000 and then repeated that feat at the Healthy Kidney 10K in New York. She started the San Diego Marathon with a quick pace and reached the halfway marker in 1:09:53 hours. Her second half was not as fast but she still won the race in a new personal best of 2:23:31 hours – a time that also beat Joan Benoit's record for the fastest marathon in California, set at the 1984 Olympic marathon more than 26 years earlier. Deba had also surpassed the best time set by her husband, who remarked: "I will try harder to get the record back. I will not sleep anymore". Two months later she came third at the Beach to Beacon 10K. She placed second at the 2011 New York City Marathon with her new personal best, 2:23:19 hours.

== 2012 ==
She was set to compete at the 2012 Boston Marathon but was a late withdrawal due to a foot injury. She returned to competition in 2013 at the Houston Marathon and her run of 2:24:26 hours was enough for second place behind Merima Mohammed.

== 2014 ==
In 2014, Deba ran the New York Half in 1:08:59, and won the 2014 Boston Marathon in 2:19:59, a title awarded in December 2016 after Rita Jeptoo was disqualified over doping. In April 2024, The Wall Street Journal reported she was still awaiting payment of the winner's prize money for her first place finish in that event, as well as the bonus for setting the women's course record. In May 2024, businessman Doug Guyer paid the missing prize money after reading the Journal article and urged Marathon organizers to pay the remaining bonus.

On November 2, 2014, Deba placed 9th among the women's field in the TCS New York City Marathon with a time of 2:31:40.

== 2015 ==
In 2015, Deba finished third in the Boston Marathon with a time of 2:25:09.
