= Joy Johnson (runner) =

American marathon runner

Joy Johnson (1926–2013) was an American marathon runner.

Johnson ran 25 times in the New York City Marathon. She holds the record as the oldest female finisher in the event.

She did not begin running until age 59 and was a high school teacher.
