= 2005 IAAF World Cross Country Championships – Senior women's race =

Senior women's race at the 2005 IAAF World Cross Country Championships
- Organisers: IAAF
- Edition: 33rd
- Date: March 19
- Host city: Saint-Galmier, Rhône-Alpes, France
- Venue: Hippodrome Joseph Desjoyaux
- Events: 1
- Distances: 8.108 km – Senior women
- Participation: 91 athletes from 31 nations

The Senior women's race at the 2005 IAAF World Cross Country Championships was held at the Hippodrome Joseph Desjoyaux in Saint-Galmier near Saint-Étienne, France, on March 19, 2005. Reports of the event were given in The New York Times, in the Herald, and for the IAAF.

Complete results for individuals, for teams, medallists, and the results of British athletes who took part were published.

== Race results ==
=== Senior women's race (8.108 km) ===
==== Individual ====
Rank	Athlete	Country	Time
1st place, gold medalist(s)	Tirunesh Dibaba	Ethiopia	26:34
2nd place, silver medalist(s)	Alice Timbilil	Kenya	26:37
3rd place, bronze medalist(s)	Worknesh Kidane	Ethiopia	26:37
4	Meselech Melkamu	Ethiopia	26:39
5	Isabella Ochichi	Kenya	26:43
6	Catherine Kirui	Kenya	26:49
7	Benita Johnson	Australia	26:55
8	Gete Wami	Ethiopia	27:20
9	Rose Jepchumba	Kenya	27:25
10	Bezunesh Bekele	Ethiopia	27:27
11	Irene Kipchumba	Kenya	27:29
12	Kim Smith	New Zealand	27:37
13	Colleen de Reuck	United States	27:51
14	Merima Hashim	Ethiopia	28:02
15	Anália Rosa	Portugal	28:05
16	Anna Thompson	Australia	28:12
17	Viktoriya Klimina	Russia	28:18
18	Irene Limika	Kenya	28:25
19	Zhang Chong	China	28:32
20	Zakia Mohamed	Tanzania	28:37
21	Ana Dias	Portugal	28:39
22	Suzanne Ritter	Germany	28:43
23	Fatiha Klilech-Fauvel	France	28:43
24	Mónica Rosa	Portugal	28:45
25	Kazue Ogoshi	Japan	28:47
26	Inês Monteiro	Portugal	28:54
27	Mara Yamauchi	United Kingdom	28:55
28	Kayo Sugihara	Japan	28:55
29	Katie McGregor	United States	28:57
30	Noriko Takayama	Japan	28:57
31	Maria Martins	France	29:00
32	Natalie Harvey	United Kingdom	29:01
33	Hayley Yelling	United Kingdom	29:05
34	Margaret Maury	France	29:05
35	Teresa Recio	Spain	29:08
36	Zaituni Jumanne	Tanzania	29:08
37	Liz Yelling	United Kingdom	29:14
38	Kathy Newberry	United States	29:14
39	Yoshiko Ichikawa	Japan	29:19
40	Vincenza Sicari	Italy	29:22
41	Fatima Yvelain	France	29:23
42	Renee Metivier	United States	29:24
43	Angela Rinicella	Italy	29:25
44	Tara Quinn	Canada	29:26
45	Rosa Morató	Spain	29:31
46	Laura Turner	United States	29:37
47	Alessandra Aguilar	Spain	29:39
48	Miwako Yamanaka	Japan	29:40
49	Rkia Chébili	France	29:42
50	Samukeliso Moyo	Zimbabwe	29:46
51	Olga Minina	Belarus	29:47
52	Hayley McGregor	Australia	29:48
53	Federica Dal Ri	Italy	29:51
54	Judit Plá	Spain	29:57
55	Poppy Mlambo	South Africa	30:02
56	Latifa Essarokh	France	30:05
57	Silvia La Barbera	Italy	30:07
58	Nathalie De Vos	Belgium	30:08
59	Tiffany Levette	Australia	30:18
60	Flavia Gaviglio	Italy	30:21
61	Adélia Elias	Portugal	30:22
62	Lucélia Peres	Brazil	30:28
63	Maria Protopappa	Greece	30:30
64	Chelsea Smith	United States	30:32
65	Dolores Pulido	Spain	30:35
66	Michela Zanatta	Italy	30:38
67	Eloise Wellings	Australia	30:47
68	Xi Qiuhong	China	30:54
69	Eliza Cuellar	Mexico	30:56
70	Marina Gurbina	Kazakhstan	30:59
71	Elizabeth Wightman	Canada	31:08
72	Chichi Jermayano Guly	Eritrea	31:08
73	Maria Moraes	Brazil	31:15
74	Fernanda Miranda	Portugal	31:17
75	Julia Viellehner	Germany	31:20
76	Ruhama Shauri	Tanzania	31:27
77	Sharon Tavengwa	Zimbabwe	31:37
78	Rosalind Mullins	Canada	31:44
79	Lida Hernández	Guatemala	31:44
80	Hilaria Johannes	Namibia	32:04
81	Shari Boyle	Canada	32:10
82	Eden Tesfalem	Eritrea	32:18
83	Elena Guerra	Uruguay	32:36
84	Elizabete Cruz	Brazil	32:50
85	Magda de Lazari	Brazil	34:51
86	Ziyodahon Abdullaeva	Uzbekistan	36:47
—	Kathy Butler	United Kingdom	DNF
—	Elisabeth Mongudhi	Namibia	DNF
—	Jacqueline Martín	Spain	DNF
—	Susana Rebolledo	Chile	DNF
—	Kenza Wahbi	Morocco	DNF
—	Maryam Yusuf Jamal	Bahrain	DNS
—	Lourdes Cruz	Puerto Rico	DNS
—	Charlotte Dale	United Kingdom	DNS

==== Teams ====
Rank	Team	Points
1st place, gold medalist(s)	Ethiopia: Tirunesh Dibaba / 1; Worknesh Kidane / 3; Meselech Melkamu / 4; Gete Wami / 8; (Bezunesh Bekele) / (10); (Merima Hashim) / (14)	16
2nd place, silver medalist(s)	Kenya: Alice Timbilil / 2; Isabella Ochichi / 5; Catherine Kirui / 6; Rose Jepchumba / 9; (Irene Kipchumba) / (11); (Irene Limika) / (18)	22
3rd place, bronze medalist(s)	Portugal: Anália Rosa / 15; Ana Dias / 21; Mónica Rosa / 24; Inês Monteiro / 26; (Adélia Elias) / (61); (Fernanda Miranda) / (74)	86
4	Japan: Kazue Ogoshi / 25; Kayo Sugihara / 28; Noriko Takayama / 30; Yoshiko Ichikawa / 39; (Miwako Yamanaka) / (48)	122
5	United States: Colleen de Reuck / 13; Katie McGregor / 29; Kathy Newberry / 38; Renee Metivier / 42; (Laura Turner) / (46)	122
6	United Kingdom: Mara Yamauchi / 27; Natalie Harvey / 32; Hayley Yelling / 33; Liz Yelling / 37; (Kathy Butler) / (DNF)	129
7	France: Fatiha Klilech-Fauvel / 23; Maria Martins / 31; Margaret Maury / 34; Fatima Yvelain / 41; (Rkia Chébili) / (49); (Latifa Essarokh) / (56)	129
8	Australia: Benita Johnson / 7; Anna Thompson / 16; Hayley McGregor / 52; Tiffany Levette / 59; (Eloise Wellings) / (67)	134
9	Spain: Teresa Recio / 35; Rosa Morató / 45; Alessandra Aguilar / 47; Judit Plá / 54; (Dolores Pulido) / (65); (Jacqueline Martín) / (DNF)	181
10	Italy: Vincenza Sicari / 40; Angela Rinicella / 43; Federica Dal Ri / 53; Silvia La Barbera / 57; (Flavia Gaviglio) / (60); (Michela Zanatta) / (66)	193
11	Canada: Tara Quinn / 44; Elizabeth Wightman / 71; Rosalind Mullins / 78; Shari Boyle / 81	274
12	Brazil: Lucélia Peres / 62; Maria Moraes / 73; Elizabete Cruz / 84; Magda de Lazari / 85	304

- Note: Athletes in parentheses did not score for the team result.

== Participation ==
According to an unofficial count, 91 athletes from 31 countries participated in the Senior women's race. The announced athletes from Bahrain and Puerto Rico did not show.

- Australia (5)
- Belarus (1)
- Belgium (1)
- Brazil (4)
- Canada (4)
- Chile (1)
- China (2)
- Eritrea (2)
- Ethiopia (6)
- France (6)
- Germany (2)
- Greece (1)
- Guatemala (1)
- Italy (6)
- Japan (5)
- Kazakhstan (1)
- Kenya (6)
- Mexico (1)
- Morocco (1)
- Namibia (2)
- New Zealand (1)
- Portugal (6)
- Russia (1)
- South Africa (1)
- Spain (6)
- Tanzania (3)
- United Kingdom (5)
- United States (6)
- Uruguay (1)
- Uzbekistan (1)
- Zimbabwe (2)

== See also ==
- 2005 IAAF World Cross Country Championships – Senior men's race
- 2005 IAAF World Cross Country Championships – Men's short race
- 2005 IAAF World Cross Country Championships – Junior men's race
- 2005 IAAF World Cross Country Championships – Women's short race
- 2005 IAAF World Cross Country Championships – Junior women's race
