= 2005 IAAF World Cross Country Championships – Women's short race =

Women's short race at the 2005 IAAF World Cross Country Championships
- Organisers: IAAF
- Edition: 33rd
- Date: March 20
- Host city: Saint-Galmier, Rhône-Alpes, France
- Venue: Hippodrome Joseph Desjoyaux
- Events: 6
- Distances: 4.196 km – Women's short
- Participation: 104 athletes from 29 nations

The Women's short race at the 2005 IAAF World Cross Country Championships was held at the Hippodrome Joseph Desjoyaux in Saint-Galmier near Saint-Étienne, France, on March 20, 2005. Reports of the event were given in The New York Times, in the Herald, and for the IAAF.

Complete results for individuals, for teams, medallists, and the results of British athletes who took part were published.

== Race results ==
=== Women's short race (4.196 km) ===
==== Individual ====
Rank	Athlete	Country	Time
1st place, gold medalist(s)	Tirunesh Dibaba	Ethiopia	13:15
2nd place, silver medalist(s)	Worknesh Kidane	Ethiopia	13:16
3rd place, bronze medalist(s)	Isabella Ochichi	Kenya	13:21
4	Prisca Ngetich	Kenya	13:25
5	Lucy Wangui	Kenya	13:25
6	Meselech Melkamu	Ethiopia	13:28
7	Beatrice Chepchumba	Kenya	13:31
8	Nancy Jebet Lagat	Kenya	13:31
9	Deriba Alemu	Ethiopia	13:41
10	Alevtina Ivanova	Russia	13:42
11	Lauren Fleshman	United States	13:44
12	Bezunesh Bekele	Ethiopia	13:44
13	Sarah Jamieson	Australia	13:44
14	Ejagayehu Dibaba	Ethiopia	13:51
15	Blake Russell	United States	13:57
16	Bouchra Chaâbi	Morocco	13:57
17	Jolene Byrne	Ireland	14:02
18	Dorcus Inzikuru	Uganda	14:03
19	Anna Thompson	Australia	14:04
20	Shalane Flanagan	United States	14:05
21	Shayne Culpepper	United States	14:06
22	Mariem Alaoui Selsouli	Morocco	14:09
23	Viola Kibiwott	Kenya	14:10
24	Binnaz Uslu	Turkey	14:11
25	Carmen Douma-Hussar	Canada	14:11
26	Simret Sultan	Eritrea	14:14
27	Anália Rosa	Portugal	14:14
28	Viktoriya Klimina	Russia	14:15
29	Fatma Lanouar	Tunisia	14:17
30	Natalya Pavlovskaya	Russia	14:19
31	Jéssica Augusto	Portugal	14:20
32	Liliya Shobukhova	Russia	14:22
33	Maryam Jamal	Bahrain	14:23
34	Maria McCambridge	Ireland	14:24
35	Rodica Moroianu	France	14:24
36	Minori Hayakari	Japan	14:25
37	Mónica Rosa	Portugal	14:26
38	Poppy Mlambo	South Africa	14:26
39	Marina Bastos	Portugal	14:26
40	Kate Reed	United Kingdom	14:26
41	Malika Asahssah	Morocco	14:29
42	Julie Coulaud	France	14:30
43	Yoshiko Ichikawa	Japan	14:31
44	Marina Ivanova	Russia	14:33
45	Stéphanie Nonnotte	France	14:33
46	Georgie Clarke	Australia	14:33
47	Hattie Dean	United Kingdom	14:34
48	Habiba Ghribi	Tunisia	14:35
49	Lebogang Phalula	South Africa	14:35
50	Zulema Fuentes-Pila	Spain	14:36
51	Olga Minina	Belarus	14:36
52	Amy Mortimer	United States	14:37
53	Saïda El Mehdi	Morocco	14:38
54	Jessica Wright	New Zealand	14:38
55	Megan Metcalfe	Canada	14:38
56	Courtney Inman	Canada	14:40
57	Helen Clitheroe	United Kingdom	14:42
58	Kate McIlroy	New Zealand	14:43
59	Hilary Edmondson	Canada	14:44
60	Christine Bardelle	France	14:46
61	René Kalmer	South Africa	14:47
62	Olga Roseyeva	Russia	14:48
63	Hayley Yelling	United Kingdom	14:48
64	Justyna Lesman	Poland	14:48
65	Tiffany Levette	Australia	14:49
66	Emma Rilen	Australia	14:49
67	Elodie Olivares	France	14:49
68	Christelle Daunay	France	14:50
69	Sandra Amarillo	Argentina	14:52
70	Lisa Dobriskey	United Kingdom	14:53
71	Karina Córdoba	Argentina	14:55
72	Silvia Montane	Spain	14:55
73	Leonor Carneiro	Portugal	14:56
74	Rebecca Stallwood	Canada	14:59
75	Fionnuala Britton	Ireland	14:59
76	Iris Fuentes-Pila	Spain	15:00
77	Cláudia Pereira	Portugal	15:02
78	Lisa Labrecque	Canada	15:04
79	Dina Lebo Phalula	South Africa	15:06
80	Liesbeth van de Velde	Belgium	15:07
81	Diana Martín	Spain	15:08
82	Terumi Takahashi	Japan	15:09
83	Nadia Rodríguez	Argentina	15:12
84	Sultana Aït Hammou	Morocco	15:14
85	Safa Aissaoui	Tunisia	15:14
86	Beraki Yirgalem Gebrekidan	Eritrea	15:15
87	Sonia Bejarano	Spain	15:15
88	Sara Valderas	Spain	15:17
89	Gloria Mera	Mexico	15:19
90	Melissa Buttry	United States	15:19
91	Susana Rebolledo	Chile	15:20
92	Pauline Curley	Ireland	15:21
93	María Peralta	Argentina	15:23
94	Suzy Walsham	Australia	15:29
95	Ayumi Takada	Japan	15:32
96	Elke Offergeld	Belgium	15:35
97	Mercedita Manipol	Philippines	15:38
98	Niamh O'Sullivan	Ireland	15:39
99	Griet Terryn	Belgium	16:14
100	Sitora Hamidova	Uzbekistan	16:15
101	Sara Abou Hassan	Egypt	16:18
102	Desiree Kruger	South Africa	16:24
103	Amel Tlili	Tunisia	17:00
—	Seloua Ouaziz	Morocco	DNF
—	Kayo Sugihara	Japan	DNS
—	Kathy Butler	United Kingdom	DNS

==== Teams ====
Rank	Team	Points
1st place, gold medalist(s)	Ethiopia: Tirunesh Dibaba / 1; Worknesh Kidane / 2; Meselech Melkamu / 6; Deriba Alemu / 9; (Bezunesh Bekele) / (12); (Ejagayehu Dibaba) / (14)	18
2nd place, silver medalist(s)	Kenya: Isabella Ochichi / 3; Prisca Ngetich / 4; Lucy Wangui / 5; Beatrice Chepchumba / 7; (Nancy Jebet Lagat) / (8); (Viola Kibiwott) / (23)	19
3rd place, bronze medalist(s)	United States: Lauren Fleshman / 11; Blake Russell / 15; Shalane Flanagan / 20; Shayne Culpepper / 21; (Amy Mortimer) / (52); (Melissa Buttry) / (90)	67
4	Russia: Alevtina Ivanova / 10; Viktoriya Klimina / 28; Natalya Pavlovskaya / 30; Liliya Shobukhova / 32; (Marina Ivanova) / (44); (Olga Roseyeva) / (62)	100
5	Morocco: Bouchra Chaâbi / 16; Mariem Alaoui Selsouli / 22; Malika Asahssah / 41; Saïda El Mehdi / 53; (Sultana Aït Hammou) / (84); (Seloua Ouaziz) / (DNF)	132
6	Portugal: Anália Rosa / 27; Jéssica Augusto / 31; Mónica Rosa / 37; Marina Bastos / 39; (Leonor Carneiro) / (73); (Cláudia Pereira) / (77)	134
7	Australia: Sarah Jamieson / 13; Anna Thompson / 19; Georgie Clarke / 46; Tiffany Levette / 65; (Emma Rilen) / (66); (Suzy Walsham) / (94)	143
8	France: Rodica Moroianu / 35; Julie Coulaud / 42; Stéphanie Nonnotte / 45; Christine Bardelle / 60; (Elodie Olivares) / (67); (Christelle Daunay) / (68)	182
9	Canada: Carmen Douma-Hussar / 25; Megan Metcalfe / 55; Courtney Inman / 56; Hilary Edmondson / 59; (Rebecca Stallwood) / (74); (Lisa Labrecque) / (78)	195
10	United Kingdom: Kate Reed / 40; Hattie Dean / 47; Helen Clitheroe / 57; Hayley Yelling / 63; (Lisa Dobriskey) / (70)	207
11	Ireland: Jolene Byrne / 17; Maria McCambridge / 34; Fionnuala Britton / 75; Pauline Curley / 92; (Niamh O'Sullivan) / (98)	218
12	South Africa: Poppy Mlambo / 38; Lebogang Phalula / 49; René Kalmer / 61; Dina Lebo Phalula / 79; (Desiree Kruger) / (102)	227
13	Japan: Minori Hayakari / 36; Yoshiko Ichikawa / 43; Terumi Takahashi / 82; Ayumi Takada / 95	256
14	Tunisia: Fatma Lanouar / 29; Habiba Ghribi / 48; Safa Aissaoui / 85; Amel Tlili / 103	265
15	Spain: Zulema Fuentes-Pila / 50; Silvia Montane / 72; Iris Fuentes-Pila / 76; Diana Martín / 81; (Sonia Bejarano) / (87); (Sara Valderas) / (88)	279
16	Argentina: Sandra Amarillo / 69; Karina Córdoba / 71; Nadia Rodríguez / 83; María Peralta / 93	316

- Note: Athletes in parentheses did not score for the team result.

== Participation ==
According to an unofficial count, 104 athletes from 29 countries participated in the Women's short race.

- Argentina (4)
- Australia (6)
- Bahrain (1)
- Belarus (1)
- Belgium (3)
- Canada (6)
- Chile (1)
- Egypt (1)
- Eritrea (2)
- Ethiopia (6)
- France (6)
- Ireland (5)
- Japan (4)
- Kenya (6)
- Mexico (1)
- Morocco (6)
- New Zealand (2)
- Philippines (1)
- Poland (1)
- Portugal (6)
- Russia (6)
- South Africa (5)
- Spain (6)
- Tunisia (4)
- Turkey (1)
- Uganda (1)
- United Kingdom (5)
- United States (6)
- Uzbekistan (1)

== See also ==
- 2005 IAAF World Cross Country Championships – Senior men's race
- 2005 IAAF World Cross Country Championships – Men's short race
- 2005 IAAF World Cross Country Championships – Junior men's race
- 2005 IAAF World Cross Country Championships – Senior women's race
- 2005 IAAF World Cross Country Championships – Junior women's race
