= 2005 IAAF World Cross Country Championships – Senior men's race =

Senior men's race at the 2005 IAAF World Cross Country Championships
- Organisers: IAAF
- Edition: 33rd
- Date: March 20
- Host city: Saint-Galmier, Rhône-Alpes, France
- Venue: Hippodrome Joseph Desjoyaux
- Events: 1
- Distances: 12.02 km – Senior men
- Participation: 146 athletes from 42 nations

The Senior men's race at the 2005 IAAF World Cross Country Championships was held at the Hippodrome Joseph Desjoyaux in Saint-Galmier near Saint-Étienne, France, on March 20, 2005. Reports of the event were given in The New York Times, in the Herald, and for the IAAF.

Complete results for individuals, for teams, medallists, and the results of British athletes who took part were published.

== Race results ==
=== Senior men's race (12.02 km) ===
==== Individual ====
Rank	Athlete	Country	Time
1st place, gold medalist(s)	Kenenisa Bekele	Ethiopia	35:06
2nd place, silver medalist(s)	Zersenay Tadesse	Eritrea	35:20
3rd place, bronze medalist(s)	Abdullah Ahmed Hassan	Qatar	35:34
4	Abebe Dinkessa	Ethiopia	35:37
5	Eliud Kipchoge	Kenya	35:37
6	Dejene Berhanu	Ethiopia	35:42
7	Boniface Kiprop	Uganda	35:45
8	Saif Saeed Shaheen	Qatar	35:53
9	John Cheruiyot Korir	Kenya	36:00
10	Charles Kamathi	Kenya	36:03
11	Wilberforce Talel	Kenya	36:07
12	Jamal Bilal Salem	Qatar	36:28
13	Eshetu Gezhagne	Ethiopia	36:31
14	Sergiy Lebid	Ukraine	36:33
15	Yonas Kifle	Eritrea	36:37
16	Cutbert Nyasango	Zimbabwe	36:39
17	Samson Kiflemariam	Eritrea	36:50
18	Moses Mosop	Kenya	36:51
19	Ali Al-Dawoodi	Qatar	36:58
20	Tesfayohannes Mesfen	Eritrea	37:02
21	Khalid El Amri	Morocco	37:07
22	Craig Mottram	Australia	37:11
23	Abraham Cherono	Kenya	37:15
24	Juan Carlos de la Ossa	Spain	37:17
25	Kaelo Mosalagae	Botswana	37:20
26	Carles Castillejo	Spain	37:22
27	Azzedine Zerdoum	Algeria	37:22
28	Majid Aman Awadh	Qatar	37:25
29	Khalid Zoubaa	France	37:28
30	Tessema Absher	Ethiopia	37:33
31	Ahmed Baday	Morocco	37:37
32	Dieudonné Disi	Rwanda	37:41
33	Lewis Masunda	Zimbabwe	37:41
34	Patrick Nyangero	Tanzania	37:49
35	Mohamed Amyn	Morocco	37:49
36	Wilson Busienei	Uganda	37:50
37	Mo Farah	United Kingdom	37:50
38	Alejandro Suárez	Mexico	37:51
39	Jean Baptiste Simukeka	Rwanda	37:53
40	Mauricio Díaz	Chile	37:54
41	Kelvin Pangiso	Zimbabwe	37:55
42	Kensuke Takahashi	Japan	37:56
43	Gabriele De Nard	Italy	37:59
44	Yahia Azaidj	Algeria	38:05
45	Ahmed Naïli	Algeria	38:06
46	Fernando Silva	Portugal	38:11
47	Maurizio Leone	Italy	38:14
48	Jean-Berchmans Ndayisenga	Burundi	38:17
49	Nchenami Siwane	Botswana	38:18
50	Saïd Belaout	Algeria	38:21
51	Stephen Rogart	Tanzania	38:23
52	Driss El Himer	France	38:24
53	Manuel Magalhães	Portugal	38:24
54	Fethi Meftah	Algeria	38:29
55	Gilbert Chirchir Kiptum	Uganda	38:29
56	Ricardo Ribas	Portugal	38:30
57	Alfredo Bráz	Portugal	38:32
58	Hans Janssens	Belgium	38:33
59	Egide Manirazika	Burundi	38:36
60	Matt Withrow	United States	38:41
61	Ian Dobson	United States	38:45
62	Dathan Ritzenhein	United States	38:46
63	Simon Field	Australia	38:46
64	Abdellah Béhar	France	38:49
65	Han Gang	China	38:51
66	Alejandro Gómez	Spain	38:52
67	Steffan White	United Kingdom	38:52
68	Ignacio Cáceres	Spain	38:54
69	Kenichi Takahashi	Japan	38:56
70	Rachid Safari	Rwanda	38:56
71	Vinny Mulvey	Ireland	38:58
72	Marcel Hewamudalige	Canada	39:00
73	Francis Robert Naali	Tanzania	39:05
74	Umberto Pusterla	Italy	39:07
75	Brahim Chettah	Algeria	39:09
76	Masaru Takamizawa	Japan	39:09
77	Giuliano Battocletti	Italy	39:12
78	Andrew Smith	Canada	39:13
79	Matt Gabrielson	United States	39:13
80	Jason Lehmkuhle	United States	39:14
81	Hélder Ornelas	Portugal	39:16
82	Yuki Matsuoka	Japan	39:17
83	Valens Bivahagumye	Rwanda	39:18
84	James Kibet	Uganda	39:19
85	Rik Ceulemans	Belgium	39:25
86	Jean Bosco Ndagijimana	Rwanda	39:26
87	Isaya Deengw	Tanzania	39:29
88	Rees Buck	New Zealand	39:30
89	Mark Kenneally	Ireland	39:31
90	José Semprun	Venezuela	39:32
91	Boiphemelo Selagaboy	Botswana	39:37
92	Moeketsi Mosuhli	Lesotho	39:38
93	Remy Hayimana	Burundi	39:39
94	Paul Kezes	United States	39:41
95	Giovanni Gualdi	Italy	39:43
96	Róbert Štefko	Czech Republic	39:47
97	Mark Tucker	Australia	39:52
98	Karl Keska	United Kingdom	39:53
99	Reinholdt Iita	Namibia	39:56
100	Yuki Nakamura	Japan	39:57
101	Richard Arias	Ecuador	40:00
102	Peter Nowill	Australia	40:01
103	Calvin Staples	Canada	40:06
104	Servando Rubío	Mexico	40:07
105	Edgar Chancusig	Ecuador	40:10
106	Andrew Caine	United Kingdom	40:15
107	Martin Toroitich	Uganda	40:17
108	Keenetse Moswasi	Botswana	40:17
109	Rui Vieira	Portugal	40:18
110	Joe McAlister	Ireland	40:21
111	William Naranjo	Colombia	40:22
112	Mikaël Thomas	France	40:23
113	Terukazu Omori	Japan	40:23
114	Suliman Al-Ghodran	Jordan	40:31
115	David Ruschena	Australia	40:41
116	Franklin Tenorio	Ecuador	40:45
117	Paul McNamara	Ireland	41:04
118	Zhang Yunshan	China	41:07
119	James Nielsen	Canada	41:07
120	Gavin Thompson	United Kingdom	41:20
121	Albert Donawa	Bermuda	41:22
122	Salah Juaim	Yemen	41:25
123	Alfredo Arévalo	Guatemala	41:29
124	Silvio Guerra	Ecuador	41:34
125	Eric Gillis	Canada	41:46
126	Brent Corbitt	Canada	42:37
127	Kahsay Kidane	Eritrea	44:23
128	Sokhibdjan Sharipov	Tajikistan	44:30
129	Konan Severin N'dri	Côte d'Ivoire	46:58
—	Eliseo Martín	Spain	DNF
—	Ernest Ndjissipou	Central African Republic	DNF
—	Bouabdallah Tahri	France	DNF
—	Glynn Tromans	United Kingdom	DNF
—	Abdelhadi Habassa	Morocco	DNF
—	Tom van Hooste	Belgium	DNF
—	Sultan Khamis Zaman	Qatar	DNF
—	Javier Guerra	Spain	DNF
—	Gebre-egziabher Gebremariam	Ethiopia	DNF
—	Gary Murray	Ireland	DNF
—	Luigi La Bella	Italy	DNF
—	Aziz Driouche	Morocco	DNF
—	Michael Ngaaseke	Zimbabwe	DNF
—	Hicham Chatt	Morocco	DNF
—	Joachim Nshimirimana	Burundi	DNF
—	El-Mokhtar Benhari	France	DNF
—	Andrey Karotska	Belarus	DNF
—	Richard Jeremiah	Australia	DNS
—	Ruben IIndongo	Namibia	DNS
—	Motsehi Moeketsana	South Africa	DNS
—	Fabiano Joseph	Tanzania	DNS
—	Cristián Rosales	Uruguay	DNS

==== Teams ====
Rank	Team	Points
1st place, gold medalist(s)	Ethiopia: Kenenisa Bekele / 1; Abebe Dinkessa / 4; Dejene Berhanu / 6; Eshetu Gezhagne / 13; (Tessema Absher) / (30); (Gebre-egziabher Gebremariam) / (DNF)	24
2nd place, silver medalist(s)	Kenya: Eliud Kipchoge / 5; John Cheruiyot Korir / 9; Charles Kamathi / 10; Wilberforce Talel / 11; (Moses Mosop) / (18); (Abraham Cherono) / (23)	35
3rd place, bronze medalist(s)	Qatar: Abdullah Ahmed Hassan / 3; Saif Saeed Shaheen / 8; Jamal Bilal Salem / 12; Ali Al-Dawoodi / 19; (Majid Aman Awadh) / (28); (Sultan Khamis Zaman) / (DNF)	42
4	Eritrea: Zersenay Tadesse / 2; Yonas Kifle / 15; Samson Kiflemariam / 17; Tesfayohannes Mesfen / 20; (Kahsay Kidane) / (127)	54
5	Algeria: Azzedine Zerdoum / 27; Yahia Azaidj / 44; Ahmed Naïli / 45; Saïd Belaout / 50; (Fethi Meftah) / (54); (Brahim Chettah) / (75)	166
6	Uganda: Boniface Kiprop / 7; Wilson Busienei / 36; Gilbert Chirchir Kiptum / 55; James Kibet / 84; (Martin Toroitich) / (107)	182
7	Spain: Juan Carlos de la Ossa / 24; Carles Castillejo / 26; Alejandro Gómez / 66; Ignacio Cáceres / 68; (Eliseo Martín) / (DNF); (Javier Guerra) / (DNF)	184
8	Portugal: Fernando Silva / 46; Manuel Magalhães / 53; Ricardo Ribas / 56; Alfredo Bráz / 57; (Hélder Ornelas) / (81); (Rui Vieira) / (109)	212
9	Rwanda: Dieudonné Disi / 32; Jean Baptiste Simukeka / 39; Rachid Safari / 70; Valens Bivahagumye / 83; (Jean Bosco Ndagijimana) / (86)	224
10	Italy: Gabriele De Nard / 43; Maurizio Leone / 47; Umberto Pusterla / 74; Giuliano Battocletti / 77; (Giovanni Gualdi) / (95); (Luigi La Bella) / (DNF)	241
11	Tanzania: Patrick Nyangero / 34; Stephen Rogart / 51; Francis Robert Naali / 73; Isaya Deengw / 87	245
12	France: Khalid Zoubaa / 29; Driss El Himer / 52; Abdellah Béhar / 64; Mikaël Thomas / 112; (Bouabdallah Tahri) / (DNF); (El-Mokhtar Benhari) / (DNF)	257
13	United States: Matt Withrow / 60; Ian Dobson / 61; Dathan Ritzenhein / 62; Matt Gabrielson / 79; (Jason Lehmkuhle) / (80); (Paul Kezes) / (94)	262
14	Japan: Kensuke Takahashi / 42; Kenichi Takahashi / 69; Masaru Takamizawa / 76; Yuki Matsuoka / 82; (Yuki Nakamura) / (100); (Terukazu Omori) / (113)	269
15	Botswana: Kaelo Mosalagae / 25; Nchenami Siwane / 49; Boiphemelo Selagaboy / 91; Keenetse Moswasi / 108	273
16	Australia: Craig Mottram / 22; Simon Field / 63; Mark Tucker / 97; Peter Nowill / 102; (David Ruschena) / (115)	284
17	United Kingdom: Mo Farah / 37; Steffan White / 67; Karl Keska / 98; Andrew Caine / 106; (Gavin Thompson) / (120); (Glynn Tromans) / (DNF)	308
18	Canada: Marcel Hewamudalige / 72; Andrew Smith / 78; Calvin Staples / 103; James Nielsen / 119; (Eric Gillis) / (125); (Brent Corbitt) / (126)	372
19	Ireland: Vinny Mulvey / 71; Mark Kenneally / 89; Joe McAlister / 110; Paul McNamara / 117; (Gary Murray) / (DNF)	387
20	Ecuador: Richard Arias / 101; Edgar Chancusig / 105; Franklin Tenorio / 116; Silvio Guerra / 124	446
DNF	Morocco: (Khalid El Amri) / (21); (Ahmed Baday) / (31); (Mohamed Amyn) / (35); (Abdelhadi Habassa) / (DNF); (Aziz Driouche) / (DNF); (Hicham Chatt) / (DNF)	DNF
DNF	Zimbabwe: (Cutbert Nyasango) / (16); (Lewis Masunda) / (33); (Kelvin Pangiso) / (41); (Michael Ngaaseke) / (DNF)	DNF
DNF	Burundi: (Jean-Berchmans Ndayisenga) / (48); (Egide Manirazika) / (59); (Remy Hayimana) / (93); (Joachim Nshimirimana) / (DNF)	DNF

- Note: Athletes in parentheses did not score for the team result.

== Participation ==
According to an unofficial count, 146 athletes from 42 countries participated in the Senior men's race. The announced athletes from South Africa and Uruguay did not show.

- Algeria (6)
- Australia (5)
- Belarus (1)
- Belgium (3)
- Bermuda (1)
- Botswana (4)
- Burundi (4)
- Canada (6)
- Central African Republic (1)
- Chile (1)
- China (2)
- Colombia (1)
- Côte d'Ivoire (1)
- Czech Republic (1)
- Ecuador (4)
- Eritrea (5)
- Ethiopia (6)
- France (6)
- Guatemala (1)
- Ireland (5)
- Italy (6)
- Japan (6)
- Jordan (1)
- Kenya (6)
- Lesotho (1)
- Mexico (2)
- Morocco (6)
- Namibia (1)
- New Zealand (1)
- Portugal (6)
- Qatar (6)
- Rwanda (5)
- Spain (6)
- Tajikistan (1)
- Tanzania (4)
- Uganda (5)
- Ukraine (1)
- United Kingdom (6)
- United States (6)
- Venezuela (1)
- Yemen (1)
- Zimbabwe (4)

== See also ==
- 2005 IAAF World Cross Country Championships – Men's short race
- 2005 IAAF World Cross Country Championships – Junior men's race
- 2005 IAAF World Cross Country Championships – Senior women's race
- 2005 IAAF World Cross Country Championships – Women's short race
- 2005 IAAF World Cross Country Championships – Junior women's race
