= 2005 IAAF World Cross Country Championships – Men's short race =

Men's short race at the 2005 IAAF World Cross Country Championships
- Organisers: IAAF
- Edition: 33rd
- Date: 19 March
- Host city: Saint-Galmier, Rhône-Alpes, France
- Venue: Hippodrome Joseph Desjoyaux
- Events: 1
- Distances: 4.196 km – Men's short
- Participation: 140 athletes from 44 nations

The Men's short race at the 2005 IAAF World Cross Country Championships was held at the Hippodrome Joseph Desjoyaux in Saint-Galmier near Saint-Étienne, France, on 19 March 2005.

Kenenisa Bekele of Ethiopia won the race with a time of 11:33. Ethiopia also won the teams competition.

== Race results ==
=== Men's short race (4.196 km) ===
==== Individual ====
Rank	Athlete	Country	Time
1st place, gold medalist(s)	Kenenisa Bekele	Ethiopia	11:33
2nd place, silver medalist(s)	Abraham Chebii	Kenya	11:38
3rd place, bronze medalist(s)	Isaac Songok	Kenya	11:39
4	Saif Saeed Shaheen	Qatar	11:42
5	Jamal Bilal Salem	Qatar	11:43
6	Maregu Zewdie	Ethiopia	11:43
7	Dejene Berhanu	Ethiopia	11:43
8	Abdullah Ahmed Hassan	Qatar	11:46
9	Gebre-egziabher Gebremariam	Ethiopia	11:54
10	Shadrack Kosgei	Kenya	11:56
11	Adil Kaouch	Morocco	11:57
12	Abera Chane	Ethiopia	11:58
13	Jorge Torres	United States	11:58
14	Mohamed Moustaoui	Morocco	11:59
15	James Kwalia	Qatar	12:00
16	Henry Kipchirchir	Kenya	12:01
17	Sammy Kipketer	Kenya	12:01
18	Abderrahim Goumri	Morocco	12:06
19	Sultan Khamis Zaman	Qatar	12:09
20	Cutbert Nyasango	Zimbabwe	12:13
21	Kevin Sullivan	Canada	12:13
22	Hicham Bellani	Morocco	12:14
23	Rabah Aboud	Algeria	12:16
24	Khoudir Aggoune	Algeria	12:16
25	Ghirmay Tikabo	Eritrea	12:17
26	Mohamed Awol	Ethiopia	12:18
27	Damian Paul Chopa	Tanzania	12:18
28	Christian Belz	Switzerland	12:19
29	Amanuel Waldeselassie	Eritrea	12:20
30	Kelvin Pangiso	Zimbabwe	12:20
31	Azzedine Zerdoum	Algeria	12:21
32	Rashid Ramzi	Bahrain	12:22
33	Simone Zanon	Italy	12:22
34	Antar Zerguelaïne	Algeria	12:22
35	Khamis Abdulla Saifeldin	Qatar	12:23
36	Khalid El Amri	Morocco	12:23
37	Brimin Kipruto	Kenya	12:26
38	Ruben Ramolefi	South Africa	12:27
39	Juan Carlos Higuero	Spain	12:28
40	Samir Moussaoui	Algeria	12:28
41	Hamid Ezzine	Morocco	12:29
42	José Luis Blanco	Spain	12:30
43	Michael Ngaaseke	Zimbabwe	12:30
44	Richard Jeremiah	Australia	12:30
45	Patrick Nyangero	Tanzania	12:30
46	Stephen Rogart	Tanzania	12:31
47	Hassan Oubassour	France	12:31
48	Jesús Torres	Mexico	12:31
49	Abdulhak Zakaria	Bahrain	12:31
50	Gaël Pencréach	France	12:32
51	Manuel Damião	Portugal	12:33
52	Reid Coolsaet	Canada	12:33
53	John Mayock	United Kingdom	12:33
54	Luís Miguel Martín	Spain	12:35
55	Merzak Ouldbouchiba	Algeria	12:35
56	Francisco Javier Lara	Spain	12:35
57	Juan Luis Barrios	Mexico	12:35
58	Samwel Shauri	Tanzania	12:36
59	Rees Buck	New Zealand	12:36
60	Donald Sage	United States	12:36
61	Micxhael Tesfay	Eritrea	12:37
62	Yuri Floriani	Italy	12:38
63	Luciano Di Pardo	Italy	12:39
64	Michael Skinner	United Kingdom	12:39
65	Philipp Bandi	Switzerland	12:40
66	Yuichiro Ueno	Japan	12:40
67	Aléxis Abraham	France	12:40
68	Mário Teixeira	Portugal	12:41
69	Adrian Blincoe	New Zealand	12:42
70	Lewis Masunda	Zimbabwe	12:42
71	Rui Silva	Portugal	12:42
72	Roberto García	Spain	12:43
73	Jakub Czaja	Poland	12:44
74	Steven Vernon	United Kingdom	12:44
75	Luca Rosa	Italy	12:45
76	Habtai Kifletsion	Eritrea	12:45
77	Celso Ficagna	Brazil	12:45
78	Mariano Villarubia	Spain	12:45
79	Vincent Le Dauphin	France	12:46
80	Manuel Silva	Portugal	12:46
81	Matt Kerr	Canada	12:47
82	Gianni Crepaldi	Italy	12:47
83	Luke Watson	United States	12:49
84	Javier Carriqueo	Argentina	12:50
85	Andrew Baddeley	United Kingdom	12:51
86	Stefano Scaini	Italy	12:52
87	Moeketsi Mosuhli	Lesotho	12:52
88	Tsuyoshi Ugachi	Japan	12:52
89	Hermano Ferreira	Portugal	12:53
90	Spencer Barden	United Kingdom	12:54
91	Joël Bourgeois	Canada	12:56
92	José Semprun	Venezuela	12:56
93	Mihaíl Yelasákis	Greece	12:56
94	Ben Tickner	United Kingdom	12:57
95	Mandla Maseko	South Africa	12:58
96	Dave Davis	United States	12:58
97	Moorosi Soke	South Africa	13:00
98	Ronny Marie	Seychelles	13:00
99	Abd Al-Rasool Ahmed	Egypt	13:00
100	Al-Mustafa Riyadh	Bahrain	13:01
101	Shaheen Faraj	Bahrain	13:01
102	Anthony Hermanus	South Africa	13:01
103	Rachid Chékhémani	France	13:05
104	Ben Ruthe	New Zealand	13:06
105	Yasuhiro Tago	Japan	13:06
106	Amer Ayyad Helil	Egypt	13:07
107	Gladson Barbosa	Brazil	13:12
108	Boštjan Buč	Slovenia	13:12
109	Ryan McKenzie	Canada	13:14
110	Joshua McDougal	United States	13:15
111	Stéphane Joly	Switzerland	13:16
112	Matt Johnston	Canada	13:17
113	Johan Vermeiren	Belgium	13:19
114	Ueli Koch	Switzerland	13:19
115	José Rocha	Portugal	13:20
116	Margus Pirksaar	Estonia	13:20
117	Andre de Santana	Brazil	13:20
118	Alexandr Sinitsyn	Kazakhstan	13:21
119	Mirco Zwahlen	Switzerland	13:23
120	Ahmed Bakry	Egypt	13:24
121	José Amado García	Guatemala	13:27
122	Philippe Paillat	France	13:32
123	Fouly Salem	Egypt	13:33
124	Alexander Greaux	Puerto Rico	13:33
125	Andrey Karotska	Belarus	13:34
126	Johannes Morgenthaler	Switzerland	13:38
127	Dale Summerville	New Zealand	13:40
128	Rene Herrera	Philippines	13:42
129	Tiidrek Nurme	Estonia	13:47
130	Ahmed Nasr Ali Al-Ragami	Yemen	13:53
131	Omar Bekkali	Belgium	13:57
132	Roman Fosti	Estonia	14:01
133	Cheikh Ndiaye	Senegal	14:05
134	Israel dos Anjos	Brazil	14:06
135	Ajmal Amirov	Tajikistan	14:14
136	Maxime Idy	Central African Republic	14:17
137	Nuftillo Davronov	Uzbekistan	14:34
138	Josep Sansa	Andorra	14:48
—	Adam Goucher	United States	DNF
—	Nikolai Vedehin	Estonia	DNF
—	Daniel Andrew	Tanzania	DNS

==== Teams ====
Rank	Team	Points
1st place, gold medalist(s)	Ethiopia: Kenenisa Bekele / 1; Maregu Zewdie / 6; Dejene Berhanu / 7; Gebre-egziabher Gebremariam / 9; (Abera Chane) / (12); (Mohamed Awol) / (26)	23
2nd place, silver medalist(s)	Kenya: Abraham Chebii / 2; Isaac Songok / 3; Shadrack Kosgei / 10; Henry Kipchirchir / 16; (Sammy Kipketer) / (17); (Brimin Kipruto) / (37)	31
3rd place, bronze medalist(s)	Qatar: Saif Saeed Shaheen / 4; Jamal Bilal Salem / 5; Abdullah Ahmed Hassan / 8; James Kwalia / 15; (Sultan Khamis Zaman) / (19); (Khamis Abdulla Saifeldin) / (35)	32
4	Morocco: Adil Kaouch / 11; Mohamed Moustaoui / 14; Abderrahim Goumri / 18; Hicham Bellani / 22; (Khalid El Amri) / (36); (Hamid Ezzine) / (41)	65
5	Algeria: Rabah Aboud / 23; Khoudir Aggoune / 24; Azzedine Zerdoum / 31; Antar Zerguelaïne / 34; (Samir Moussaoui) / (40); (Merzak Ouldbouchiba) / (55)	112
6	Zimbabwe: Cutbert Nyasango / 20; Kelvin Pangiso / 30; Michael Ngaaseke / 43; Lewis Masunda / 70	163
7	Tanzania: Damian Paul Chopa / 27; Patrick Nyangero / 45; Stephen Rogart / 46; Samwel Shauri / 58	176
8	Spain: Juan Carlos Higuero / 39; José Luis Blanco / 42; Luís Miguel Martín / 54; Francisco Javier Lara / 56; (Roberto García) / (72); (Mariano Villarubia) / (78)	191
9	Eritrea: Ghirmay Tikabo / 25; Amanuel Waldeselassie / 29; Micxhael Tesfay / 61; Habtai Kifletsion / 76	191
10	Italy: Simone Zanon / 33; Yuri Floriani / 62; Luciano Di Pardo / 63; Luca Rosa / 75; (Gianni Crepaldi) / (82); (Stefano Scaini) / (86)	233
11	France: Hassan Oubassour / 47; Gaël Pencréach / 50; Aléxis Abraham / 67; Vincent Le Dauphin / 79; (Rachid Chékhémani) / (103); (Philippe Paillat) / (122)	243
12	Canada: Kevin Sullivan / 21; Reid Coolsaet / 52; Matt Kerr / 81; Joël Bourgeois / 91; (Ryan McKenzie) / (109); (Matt Johnston) / (112)	245
13	United States: Jorge Torres / 13; Donald Sage / 60; Luke Watson / 83; Dave Davis / 96; (Joshua McDougal) / (110); (Adam Goucher) / (DNF)	252
14	Portugal: Manuel Damião / 51; Mário Teixeira / 68; Rui Silva / 71; Manuel Silva / 80; (Hermano Ferreira) / (89); (José Rocha) / (115)	270
15	United Kingdom: John Mayock / 53; Michael Skinner / 64; Steven Vernon / 74; Andrew Baddeley / 85; (Spencer Barden) / (90); (Ben Tickner) / (94)	276
16	Bahrain: Rashid Ramzi / 32; Abdulhak Zakaria / 49; Al-Mustafa Riyadh / 100; Shaheen Faraj / 101	282
17	Switzerland: Christian Belz / 28; Philipp Bandi / 65; Stéphane Joly / 111; Ueli Koch / 114; (Mirco Zwahlen) / (119); (Johannes Morgenthaler) / (126)	318
18	South Africa: Ruben Ramolefi / 38; Mandla Maseko / 95; Moorosi Soke / 97; Anthony Hermanus / 102	332
19	New Zealand: Rees Buck / 59; Adrian Blincoe / 69; Ben Ruthe / 104; Dale Summerville / 127	359
20	Brazil: Celso Ficagna / 77; Gladson Barbosa / 107; Andre de Santana / 117; Israel dos Anjos / 134	435
21	Egypt: Abd Al-Rasool Ahmed / 99; Amer Ayyad Helil / 106; Ahmed Bakry / 120; Fouly Salem / 123	448
DNF	Estonia: (Margus Pirksaar) / (116); (Tiidrek Nurme) / (129); (Roman Fosti) / (132); (Nikolai Vedehin) / (DNF)	DNF

- Note: Athletes in parentheses did not score for the team result.

== Participation ==
According to an unofficial count, 140 athletes from 44 countries participated in the Men's short race.

- Algeria (6)
- Andorra (1)
- Argentina (1)
- Australia (1)
- Bahrain (4)
- Belarus (1)
- Belgium (2)
- Brazil (4)
- Canada (6)
- Central African Republic (1)
- Egypt (4)
- Eritrea (4)
- Estonia (4)
- Ethiopia (6)
- France (6)
- Greece (1)
- Guatemala (1)
- Italy (6)
- Japan (3)
- Kazakhstan (1)
- Kenya (6)
- Lesotho (1)
- Mexico (2)
- Morocco (6)
- New Zealand (4)
- Philippines (1)
- Poland (1)
- Portugal (6)
- Puerto Rico (1)
- Qatar (6)
- Senegal (1)
- Seychelles (1)
- Slovenia (1)
- South Africa (4)
- Spain (6)
- Switzerland (6)
- Tajikistan (1)
- Tanzania (4)
- United Kingdom (6)
- United States (6)
- Uzbekistan (1)
- Venezuela (1)
- Yemen (1)
- Zimbabwe (4)

== See also ==
- 2005 IAAF World Cross Country Championships – Senior men's race
- 2005 IAAF World Cross Country Championships – Junior men's race
- 2005 IAAF World Cross Country Championships – Senior women's race
- 2005 IAAF World Cross Country Championships – Women's short race
- 2005 IAAF World Cross Country Championships – Junior women's race
