= Deriba =

Deriba (Amharic: ደርባ), or Diriba, is a unisex name of Ethiopian origin that may refer to:

- Deriba Alemu (born 1983), Ethiopian long-distance runner
- Deriba Merga (born 1980), Ethiopian long-distance runner and 2009 Boston Marathon winner
- Buze Diriba (born 1994), Ethiopian female long-distance runner and champion at the 2012 World Junior Championships in Athletics

== See also ==
- Deriba Caldera, highest point of the Marrah Mountains
