= Magut =

Magut is a surname of Kenyan origin. Notable people with the surname include:

- Eliud Magut, Kenyan marathon runner and winner of the 2012 French Riviera Marathon
- James Magut (born 1990), Kenyan middle-distance runner
