= Lindsey Scherf =

American long-distance runner

Personal information
- Nationality: American
- Born: September 18, 1986 (age 39)

Sport
- Country: United States
- Sport: Track and field
- Event(s): middle– and long-distance running
- College team: Harvard University, University of Oregon

Lindsey Scherf (born September 18, 1986) is a retired American middle and long-distance runner. In 2005, she ran 32:51.20 to set the American Junior Record for 10 km. In 2005, she set the American Junior Record for 5 km Indoor Track.

During her career, Scherf was issued with two competition bans due to violations of doping rules. Her first ban in 2007 was for one year and her second ban of four years is set to run from 2021 to 2025.

== NCAA ==
Scherf participated in NCAA Cross Country and Track and Field at Harvard and The University of Oregon. Scherf was a three-time NCAA Division I All-American as a freshman during 2004–05. Scherf finished 18th at the 2005 IAAF World Cross Country Junior Championships in France, the second-best finish by an American woman under-20 since 1992.

== Professional ==
Scherf placed sixth at the 2005 US Cross Country Championships to earn a spot on the US Junior Cross Country Team and finished 18th at the 2005 IAAF World Cross Country Junior Championships in France, the second-best finish by an American woman under-20 since 1992.

In 2009 Scherf competed at the 2009 IAAF World Cross Country Championships – Senior women's race.

In 2015, she won the Fifth Third River Bank Run (functioning as the US 25 km championships).

Scherf placed second on USATF's USA Road Circuit in 2016 after a seventh-place finish in road 5 km championships. On December 11, 2016, Scherf placed second in 2:34:05 at the 2016 Honolulu Marathon.

Scherf broke the indoor marathon world record at the 2018 Armory NYC Indoor Marathon World Record Challenge Presented by NYRR with 2:40:55.

== Doping Bans ==
In 2007, Scherf received a one-year ban by the United States Anti-Doping Agency for failing to submit to a drug test after receiving inadequate guidance from the US Anti-Doping Agency in processing her Therapeutic Use Exemption application for her physician prescribed asthma medication at the Gold Coast Marathon in Brisbane, Australia. The 2007 Court of Arbitration for Sport hearing, WADA v/ USADA & Scherf, concluded in passage 9.13 of the hearing's written report that "The Panel finds that exceptional circumstances did exist in this case, and agrees that Ms. Scherf bears No Significant Fault of Negligence, because her fault or negligence, when viewed in light of all of the circumstances was not significant in relation to her anti-doping rule violation."

Scherf was issued a four-year ban in 2022 after testing positive for an anabolic agent as the result of an out-of-competition test in December 2021. The ineligibility period began February 7, 2022, but Scherf retired on March 14, 2022. She was disqualified from all competitions on and subsequent to December 26, 2021.
