= Alice Timbilil =

Kenyan long-distance runner

Medal record

Women's athletics

Representing Kenya

World Cross Country Championships
Silver medal – second place	2005 Saint-Galmier	Long race

Alice Jemeli Timbilil (born 1 February 1983 in Moiben, Uasin Gishu District) is a Kenyan professional long-distance runner. She is a two-time Olympian, having competed over 10,000 metres at both the 2000 and 2004 Summer Olympics.

She initially started her career on the track, becoming the World Youth Champion in the 10,000 m and running at the 1999 World Championships in Athletics at the age of sixteen. She won a junior silver medal at the 2000 IAAF World Cross Country Championships and made her Olympic track debut the following year. She continued to mix track and cross country, making her second Olympic appearance at the 2004 Athens Games and securing a senior silver at the 2005 IAAF World Cross Country Championships.

After taking 2006 out due to the birth of her first child, she returned in 2007 and switched her focus to road running competitions. She represented Kenya at the 2007 IAAF World Road Running Championships and won the Saint Silvester Road Race. She made her marathon debut in 2008 and took her first win in the event two years later at the 2010 Amsterdam Marathon.

== Career ==
=== World youth champion ===
Timbilil started running while at Kemeliet Primary school. She won Kenyan Championships in 10,000 metres in 1999, aged only 16. At the 1999 World Youth Championships in Athletics she won 3000 metres gold medal. She competed also at the 1999 World Championships, but did not finish the 10,000 metres final after seemingly miscalculating the number of laps. She did not start high school until 2000, aged 17, when she joined Kapkenda Secondary School.

It was in the field of cross country running that she gained her first major junior medal, running at the 2000 IAAF World Cross Country Championships. Timbilil took the silver medal behind Vivian Cheruiyot, completing a Kenyan sweep of the medals which led the junior women to the team gold. At the age of seventeen, she gained selection for the 2000 Sydney Olympics and reached the 10,000 m final, finishing in fourteenth place with a personal best run of 31:50.22. She was still eligible for the junior competition at the 2001 IAAF World Cross Country Championships, but she was far from medal-winning form and finished in sixteenth place.

=== World cross country medallist ===
She took a cross country circuit wins at the Cinque Mulini in 2003 and the Oeiras International Cross Country in 2004. At the 2004 IAAF World Cross Country Championships she just missed out on the medals by finishing in fourth place behind Werknesh Kidane, although she did lead the Kenyan women to a team silver medal in the long race. She took to the Olympic stage for a second time later that year, but she failed to build on her cross country success at the 2004 Athens Games and finished in sixteenth place in the 10,000 m Olympic final. She delivered in the long race at the 2005 IAAF World Cross Country Championships the following year, however, as she edged between Tirunesh Dibaba and Werknesh to take her first major senior medal, and also leading Kenyan to a consecutive team silver behind Ethiopia. Returning to the track, she ran at the 2005 World Championships in Athletics but did not manage to finish the race, repeating her disappointing World performance of six years earlier.

=== Focus on road running ===
Timbilil won the Saint Silvester Road Race in 2007, running 15 km in 53:07. At the 2007 IAAF World Road Running Championships she finished in ninth place. She made her marathon debut at the 2008 Paris Marathon and she set a time of 2:26:45 for fifth position.

Her first major race of 2010 came at the Roma Ostia Half Marathon in February, which she won in a time of 1:10:34, beating home favourite Rosaria Console. Timbilil took part in the 2010 BIG 25 road race in Berlin in May and took second place with 1:24:38, although this was over three and a half minutes slower than Mary Keitany who set a world record. She took on Keitany at the Portugal Half Marathon and was second best again, although she beat the rest of the field by some twenty seconds. At the 2010 Amsterdam Marathon, she was among the leaders from the start and by the 35 km mark she had outrun the field, eventually winning the race by a margin of two minutes with a personal best of 2:25:03. She ended the year by setting a course record at the Saint Silvester Road Race. In 2010, she not only won her first marathon, but had improved all her personal bests over 10K, 15K, 25K and the marathon.

She was runner-up at the Goyang Half Marathon then placed eighth at the 2011 Boston Marathon the following month. In July she was runner-up at the Peachtree Road Race and winner of the Boilermaker Road Race, but did not compete again until late 2013. After a runner-up finish at a half marathon in Kisii she returned to the major circuit with a third-place finish at the Amsterdam Marathon.

== Personal life ==
She is married to Mark Sinyei (a farmer) and she gave birth to their first son, Collins Kimutai, in March 2006. She comes from an athletic family which includes runner and African Champion Nancy Lagat – her aunt. Timbilil is managed by Federico Rosa and is based at the Nike camp in Kaptagat. She comes from the same village as another female runner Vivian Cheruiyot

== Competition record ==
- (gold) 5 km Cross Country in Grand Prix Media Blenio
- (silver) Philadelphia Half Marathon
- (silver) Saltillo Half-Marathon
- (bronze) New Delhi Half Marathon.
- (silver) 2009 Lisbon Half Marathon.
- (gold) 2010 Roma Ostia Half Marathon
