= Meselech Melkamu =

Ethiopian long-distance runner (born 1985)

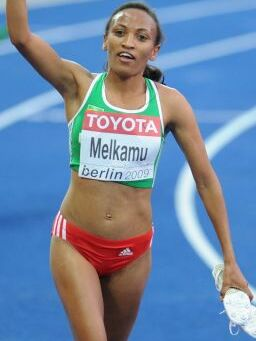
- Meselech Melkamu at the 2009 World Championships.

Medal record

Women's athletics

Representing Ethiopia

World Championships
Silver medal – second place	2009 Berlin	10,000 m

World Indoor Championships
Silver medal – second place	2008 Valencia	3000 m

World Cross Country Championships
Gold medal – first place	2004 Brussels	Junior race
Bronze medal – third place	2006 Fukuoka	Long race
Bronze medal – third place	2006 Fukuoka	Short race
Bronze medal – third place	2007 Mombasa	Senior race
Bronze medal – third place	2009 Amman	Senior race
Bronze medal – third place	2010 Bydgoszcz	Senior race

African Championships
Gold medal – first place	2008 Addis Ababa	5000 m
Silver medal – second place	2010 Nairobi	10,000 m

Meselech Melkamu (born 19 April 1985) is an Ethiopian long-distance runner. She defeated Meseret Defar to win the 5000 metres gold medal at the 2008 African Athletics Championships, but she is better known for her 29:53.80 run over 10,000 metres in 2009, which until August 2016 ranked her second on the all-time list behind world record holder Wang Junxia. She is one of seven women in history to break the 30-minute barrier and one of four Ethiopians to accomplish the feat.

Melkamu was born in Debre Marqos. Since 2012, she has competed in road races. She won the 2012 Frankfurt Marathon in a course record and personal best of 2:21:01 hours.

== Career ==
She made her breakthrough in the junior ranks in 2004 by winning the IAAF World Cross Country Championships and taking the 5000 metres title at the World Junior Championships in Athletics. She just missed the senior medals in 2005, taking fourth in the short race at the World Cross Country Championships and fourth in the 5000 metres at the World Championships.

Her first major medals as a senior athlete came the following year as Melkamu won bronze medals in both the long and short races at the 2006 IAAF World Cross Country Championships (also winning two team golds). She went on to win the 10 kilometres Great Ireland Run the following month in an event-record 31:41 minutes finish time.

She repeated her cross country bronze medal in 2007, helping the Ethiopian women win the team gold again. She also won a silver medal on the track at the All-Africa Games, finishing as runner-up behind Meseret Defar in the 5000 metres. She was sixth over that distance at the World Championships later that year.

Melkamu won her first indoor medal over 3000 metres in March 2008, again taking the second spot behind Defar at the World Indoor Championships. She did not win a medal at the World Cross Country Championships (finishing in ninth place), but she defeated Defar to win the 5000 metres at the African Championships. She was selected to represent Ethiopia at the Summer Olympic Games in Beijing, finishing seventh in the 5000 metres final in a time of 15:49.03. (She finished the race in eight place but rose to seventh after Elvan Abeylegesse's runner-up finish was expunged years later because of doping.)

She returned to the podium at the 2009 World Cross Country Championships, taking another bronze medal. On 14 June, she broke the African record in the 10,000 metres with a time of 29:53.80 at a race in Utrecht, Netherlands, bettering Tirunesh Dibaba's time of 29:54.66. She won her first world track medal later that season, finishing as runner-up to Linet Masai in the 10,000 metres at the World Championships.

She continued her bronze medal streak at the 2010 World Cross Country Championships. On 31 July, she won a silver medal at the African Championships in Nairobi, finishing second to Dibaba in the 10,000 metres. To finish the year, she won the Obudu Ranch International Mountain Race in the Obudu local government area of Nigeria, which doubled as the African Mountain Running Championships.

In February 2011, she won her fourth career title at the Jan Meda International Cross Country in Addis Ababa. At the 2012 Frankfurt Marathon, her first marathon, she stayed in the lead group until the 37 kilometre mark, after which she pulled away to victory in a new course record of 2:21:01 hours. In February 2013, she ran a half marathon personal best of 1:08:05 hours while finishing in seventh place at the Ras Al Khaimah Half Marathon in the United Arab Emirates.

== Personal bests ==
- 1500 metres – 4:07.52 (2007)
- Mile run – 4:33.94 (2003)
- 2000 metres (indoor) - 5:39.2 (2007) (intermediate time in a longer race) (12th fastest ever as of 2 April 2017)
- 3000 metres (outdoor) - 8:34.73 (2005)
- 3000 metres (indoor) - 8:23.74 (2007) (4th fastest ever as of 17 June 2017)
- 5000 metres (outdoor) – 14:31.91 (2010)
- 10,000 metres (track) – 29:53.80 (2009) (6th fastest ever as of 5 July 2017)
- 10 kilometres (road) – 31:17 (2013) (intermediate time in a longer race), 31:41 (2006)
- 15 kilometres (road) - 47:54 (2013) (intermediate time in a longer race)
- 20 kilometres (road) - 1:04:32 (2013) (intermediate time in a longer race)
- Half marathon - 1:08:05 (2013)
- 30 kilometres (road) - 1:39.21 (2014) (intermediate time in a longer race)
- Marathon – 2:21:01 (2012)

== International competitions ==
Year	Competition	Venue	Position	Event	Notes
Representing Ethiopia
2004	World Junior Championships	Grosseto, Italy	1st	5000 m	15:21.52
2005	World Cross Country Championships	Saint-Étienne/ Saint-Galmier, France	6th	Short race (4.196 km)	13:28
2005	World Cross Country Championships	Saint-Étienne/ Saint-Galmier, France	1st	Team	18 pts
2005	World Cross Country Championships	Saint-Étienne/ Saint-Galmier, France	4th	Long race (8.108 km)	26:39
2005	World Cross Country Championships	Saint-Étienne/ Saint-Galmier, France	1st	Team	16 pts
2005	World Championships	Helsinki, Finland	4th	5000 m	14:43.47
2005	World Athletics Final	Monte Carlo, Monaco	5th	3000 m	8:50.42
2006	World Cross Country Championships	Fukuoka, Japan	3rd	Short race (4 km)	12:54
2006	World Cross Country Championships	Fukuoka, Japan	1st	Team	25 pts
2006	World Cross Country Championships	Fukuoka, Japan	3rd	Long race (8 km)	25:38
2006	World Cross Country Championships	Fukuoka, Japan	1st	Team	16 pts
2006	African Championships	Bambous, Mauritius	6th	5000 m	16:01.09
2006	World Athletics Final	Stuttgart, Germany	6th	5000 m	16:08.03
2007	World Cross Country Championships	Mombasa, Kenya	3rd	Senior race (8 km)	26:48
2007	World Cross Country Championships	Mombasa, Kenya	1st	Team	19 pts
2007	All-Africa Games	Algiers, Algeria	2nd	5000 m	15:03.86
2007	World Championships	Osaka, Japan	6th	5000 m	15:01.42
2007	World Athletics Final	Stuttgart, Germany	5th	5000 m	15:06.20
2008	World Indoor Championships	Valencia, Spain	2nd	3000 m	8:41.50
2008	World Cross Country Championships	Edinburgh, United Kingdom	9th	Senior race (7.905 km)	25:51
2008	World Cross Country Championships	Edinburgh, United Kingdom	1st	Team	18 pts
2008	African Championships	Addis Ababa, Ethiopia	1st	5000 m	15:49.81
2008	Olympic Games	Beijing, China	8th	5000 m	15:49.03
2008	World Athletics Final	Stuttgart, Germany	3rd	5000 m	14:58.76
2009	World Cross Country Championships	Amman, Jordan	3rd	Senior race (8 km)	26:19
2009	World Cross Country Championships	Amman, Jordan	2nd	Senior team	28 pts
2009	World Championships	Berlin, Germany	2nd	10,000 m	30:51.34
2010	World Cross Country Championships	Bydgoszcz, Poland	3rd	Senior race (7.759 km)	24:26
2010	World Cross Country Championships	Bydgoszcz, Poland	2nd	Senior team	22 pts
2010	African Championships	Nairobi, Kenya	2nd	10,000 m	31:55.50
2011	World Cross Country Championships	Punta Umbria, Spain	4th	Senior race (8 km)	25:18
2011	World Cross Country Championships	Punta Umbria, Spain	2nd	Senior team	29 pts
2011	All-Africa Games	Maputo, Mozambique	None	10,000 m	Did not finish
2011	World Championships	Daegu, South Korea	5th	10,000 m	30:56.55
2013	World Championships	Moscow, Russia	None	Marathon	Did not finish
