= 2010 African Championships in Athletics – Women's 10,000 metres =

The women's 10,000 metres at the 2010 African Championships in Athletics were held on July 31.

== Results ==
Rank	Name	Nationality	Time	Notes
1st place, gold medalist(s)	Tirunesh Dibaba	Ethiopia	31:51.39	
2nd place, silver medalist(s)	Meselech Melkamu	Ethiopia	31:55.50	
3rd place, bronze medalist(s)	Linet Masai	Kenya	31:59.36	SB
4	Wude Ayalew	Ethiopia	32:29.92	
5	Doris Changeiywo	Kenya	32:44.07	
6	Pauline Korikwiang	Kenya	33:12.34	
7	Restituta Joseph	Tanzania	34:06.42	
8	Polines Chacha	Tanzania	35:03.09	
9	Rebecca Chacha	Tanzania	35:48.89	
10	Epiphanie Nyirabarame	Rwanda	36:04.65	
	Therese Ngono Eyoundi	Cameroon	DNS	
