= 2005 IAAF World Cross Country Championships – Junior women's race =

Junior women's race at the 2005 IAAF World Cross Country Championships
- Organisers: IAAF
- Edition: 33rd
- Date: March 19
- Host city: Saint-Galmier, Rhône-Alpes, France
- Venue: Hippodrome Joseph Desjoyaux
- Events: 1
- Distances: 6.153 km – Junior women
- Participation: 117 athletes from 34 nations

The Junior women's race at the 2005 IAAF World Cross Country Championships was held at the Hippodrome Joseph Desjoyaux in Saint-Galmier near Saint-Étienne, France, on March 19, 2005. Reports on the event were given in The New York Times, in the Glasgow Herald, and for the IAAF.

Complete results for individuals, for teams, medallists, and the results of British athletes who took part were published.

== Race results ==
=== Junior women's race (6.153 km) ===
==== Individual ====
Rank	Athlete	Country	Time
1st place, gold medalist(s)	Gelete Burka	Ethiopia	20:12
2nd place, silver medalist(s)	Veronica Wanjiru	Kenya	20:39
3rd place, bronze medalist(s)	Beatrice Chebusit	Kenya	20:44
4	Mercy Njoroge	Kenya	20:46
5	Belainesh Zemedkun	Ethiopia	20:47
6	Workitu Ayanu	Ethiopia	20:54
7	Pauline Korikwiang	Kenya	20:56
8	Gladys Chemweno	Kenya	20:57
9	Aliphine Tuliamuk	Kenya	21:09
10	Alemitu Abera	Ethiopia	21:10
11	Akane Wakita	Japan	21:16
12	Azalech Masresha	Ethiopia	21:37
13	Hitomi Niiya	Japan	21:39
14	Danette Doetzel	Canada	21:41
15	Yurika Nakamura	Japan	21:43
16	Madeline Heiner	Australia	21:52
17	Kazue Kojima	Japan	22:06
18	Lindsey Scherf	United States	22:12
19	Viktoriya Ivanova	Russia	22:15
20	Emily Pidgeon	United Kingdom	22:15
21	Ancuța Bobocel	Romania	22:18
22	Adelina De Soccio	Italy	22:21
23	Asmae Ghizlane	Morocco	22:21
24	Maya Iino	Japan	22:22
25	Yuri Suzuki	Japan	22:22
26	Irvette van Blerk	South Africa	22:24
27	Farida Makula	Tanzania	22:27
28	Erin Bedell	United States	22:32
29	Inés Melchor	Peru	22:33
30	Lindsay Flacks	United States	22:37
31	Halima Hachlaf	Morocco	22:42
32	Merat Bahta	Eritrea	22:43
33	Amina Bettiche	Algeria	22:43
34	Sian Edwards	United Kingdom	22:45
35	Sarah Ramadhan	Tanzania	22:47
36	Aïcha Bani	Morocco	22:48
37	Chahrazad Cheboub	Algeria	22:50
38	Marta Romo	Spain	22:50
39	Bai Xue	China	22:53
40	Maria Sánchez	Spain	22:57
41	Jiang Chengcheng	China	22:57
42	Elizabeth Pasciuto	United States	22:58
43	Rebecca Forlong	New Zealand	22:58
44	Aïcha Rezig	Algeria	22:59
45	Malika Benlafkir	Morocco	22:59
46	Galina Maksimova	Russia	23:02
47	Jennifer Barringer	United States	23:03
48	Varaidzo Shindi	Zimbabwe	23:05
49	Roseanne Galligan	Ireland	23:07
50	Azra Eminovic	Serbia and Montenegro	23:09
51	Elena García	Spain	23:10
52	Regina Khamzina	Russia	23:11
53	Christine Kalmer	South Africa	23:12
54	Jackline Sakilu	Tanzania	23:13
55	Karina Villazana	Peru	23:13
56	Halima Ramadhani	Tanzania	23:18
57	Kate Van Buskirk	Canada	23:19
58	Susan Kuijken	Netherlands	23:21
59	Zineb Nadir	Morocco	23:21
60	Stephanie Twell	United Kingdom	23:23
61	Oana Mircea	Romania	23:24
62	Alma Mendoza	Mexico	23:26
63	Asmaa Hallouz	Algeria	23:28
64	Weini Tedros Tesfay	Eritrea	23:29
65	Tarah McKay	Canada	23:34
66	Kheira Belmediouni	Algeria	23:35
67	Mihaela Ana Susa	Romania	23:35
68	Linda Byrne	Ireland	23:37
69	Viktoriya Kharitonova	Russia	23:37
70	Naziha Djellakh	Algeria	23:39
71	Morag MacLarty	United Kingdom	23:48
72	Selien de Schryder	Belgium	23:51
73	Rocío Cántara	Peru	23:52
74	Monica Martínez	Spain	23:53
75	Ercilia Machado	Portugal	23:53
76	Yekaterina Sagdiyeva	Russia	23:55
77	Puleng Khumalo	South Africa	23:55
78	Violet Raseboya	South Africa	23:57
79	Rosta Matlawe	South Africa	24:01
80	Volha Kaminskaya	Belarus	24:02
81	Tatyana Makarova	Russia	24:04
82	Andrea García	Spain	24:05
83	Papali Maliba	Lesotho	24:09
84	Anita Campbell	Canada	24:09
85	Morgane Riou	France	24:10
86	Aleksandra Nowak	Poland	24:14
87	Olga Rezkaya	Belarus	24:16
88	Valentina Costanza	Italy	24:17
89	Valentina Saburkina	Kazakhstan	24:25
90	Kathleen Engel	Canada	24:27
91	Barbara Maveau	Belgium	24:35
92	Fanchon Brouillet	France	24:41
93	Christina Fiduccia	United States	24:42
94	Silvia Del Fava	Italy	24:47
95	Nathalie Bouilly	France	24:53
96	Roshell Moses	South Africa	24:57
97	Andreea Cristina Plesu	Romania	25:00
98	Anna Klyushkina	Kyrgyzstan	25:07
99	Juliette Benedicto	France	25:09
100	Volha Mazuronak	Belarus	25:10
101	Francesca Fallani	Italy	25:11
102	Yekaterina Tunguskova	Uzbekistan	25:13
103	Gemma Barrachina	Spain	25:18
104	Giulia Basoli	Italy	25:23
105	Gina Stewart	Canada	25:33
106	Anne Sophie Marechal	Belgium	26:02
107	Carmen Mamani	Peru	26:03
108	Annabelle Delarue	France	26:24
109	Anna Drabenya	Belarus	26:39
110	Munguntuya Batgerel	Mongolia	26:55
111	Francesca Grana	Italy	27:01
—	Larisa Arcip	Romania	DNF
—	Sarah Morgan	New Zealand	DNF
—	Abby Westley	United Kingdom	DNF
—	Marie-Charlotte Bonnaire	France	DNF
—	Ikram Zouglali	Morocco	DNF
—	Jessica Sparke	United Kingdom	DNF

==== Teams ====
Rank	Team	Points
1st place, gold medalist(s)	Kenya: Veronica Wanjiru / 2; Beatrice Chebusit / 3; Mercy Njoroge / 4; Pauline Korikwiang / 7; (Gladys Chemweno) / (8); (Aliphine Tuliamuk) / (9)	16
2nd place, silver medalist(s)	Ethiopia: Gelete Burka / 1; Belainesh Zemedkun / 5; Workitu Ayanu / 6; Alemitu Abera / 10; (Azalech Masresha) / (12)	22
3rd place, bronze medalist(s)	Japan: Akane Wakita / 11; Hitomi Niiya / 13; Yurika Nakamura / 15; Kazue Kojima / 17; (Maya Iino) / (24); (Yuri Suzuki) / (25)	56
4	United States: Lindsey Scherf / 18; Erin Bedell / 28; Lindsay Flacks / 30; Elizabeth Pasciuto / 42; (Jennifer Barringer) / (47); (Christina Fiduccia) / (93)	118
5	Morocco: Asmae Ghizlane / 23; Halima Hachlaf / 31; Aïcha Bani / 36; Malika Benlafkir / 45; (Zineb Nadir) / (59); (Ikram Zouglali) / (DNF)	135
6	Tanzania: Farida Makula / 27; Sarah Ramadhan / 35; Jackline Sakilu / 54; Halima Ramadhani / 56	172
7	Algeria: Amina Bettiche / 33; Chahrazad Cheboub / 37; Aïcha Rezig / 44; Asmaa Hallouz / 63; (Kheira Belmediouni) / (66); (Naziha Djellakh) / (70)	177
8	United Kingdom: Emily Pidgeon / 20; Sian Edwards / 34; Stephanie Twell / 60; Morag MacLarty / 71; (Abby Westley) / (DNF); (Jessica Sparke) / (DNF)	185
9	Russia: Viktoriya Ivanova / 19; Galina Maksimova / 46; Regina Khamzina / 52; Viktoriya Kharitonova / 69; (Yekaterina Sagdiyeva) / (76); (Tatyana Makarova) / (81)	186
10	Spain: Marta Romo / 38; Maria Sánchez / 40; Elena García / 51; Monica Martínez / 74; (Andrea García) / (82); (Gemma Barrachina) / (103)	203
11	Canada: Danette Doetzel / 14; Kate Van Buskirk / 57; Tarah McKay / 65; Anita Campbell / 84; (Kathleen Engel) / (90); (Gina Stewart) / (105)	220
12	South Africa: Irvette van Blerk / 26; Christine Kalmer / 53; Puleng Khumalo / 77; Violet Raseboya / 78; (Rosta Matlawe) / (79); (Roshell Moses) / (96)	234
13	Romania: Ancuța Bobocel / 21; Oana Mircea / 61; Mihaela Ana Susa / 67; Andreea Cristina Plesu / 97; (Larisa Arcip) / (DNF)	246
14	Peru: Inés Melchor / 29; Karina Villazana / 55; Rocío Cántara / 73; Carmen Mamani / 107	264
15	Italy: Adelina De Soccio / 22; Valentina Costanza / 88; Silvia Del Fava / 94; Francesca Fallani / 101; (Giulia Basoli) / (104); (Francesca Grana) / (111)	305
16	France: Morgane Riou / 85; Fanchon Brouillet / 92; Nathalie Bouilly / 95; Juliette Benedicto / 99; (Annabelle Delarue) / (108); (Marie-Charlotte Bonnaire) / (DNF)	371
17	Belarus: Volha Kaminskaya / 80; Olga Rezkaya / 87; Volha Mazuronak / 100; Anna Drabenya / 109	376

- Note: Athletes in parentheses did not score for the team result.

== Participation ==
According to an unofficial count, 117 athletes from 34 countries participated in the Junior women's race. This is in agreement with the official numbers as published.

- Algeria (6)
- Australia (1)
- Belarus (4)
- Belgium (3)
- Canada (6)
- China (2)
- Eritrea (2)
- Ethiopia (5)
- France (6)
- Ireland (2)
- Italy (6)
- Japan (6)
- Kazakhstan (1)
- Kenya (6)
- Kyrgyzstan (1)
- Lesotho (1)
- Mexico (1)
- Mongolia (1)
- Morocco (6)
- Netherlands (1)
- New Zealand (2)
- Peru (4)
- Poland (1)
- Portugal (1)
- Romania (5)
- Russia (6)
- Serbia and Montenegro (1)
- South Africa (6)
- Spain (6)
- Tanzania (4)
- United Kingdom (6)
- United States (6)
- Uzbekistan (1)
- Zimbabwe (1)

== See also ==
- 2005 IAAF World Cross Country Championships – Senior men's race
- 2005 IAAF World Cross Country Championships – Men's short race
- 2005 IAAF World Cross Country Championships – Junior men's race
- 2005 IAAF World Cross Country Championships – Senior women's race
- 2005 IAAF World Cross Country Championships – Women's short race
