= Violet Raseboya =

South African runner

Violet Ledile Raseboya (born 19 February 1986) is a retired South African middle-distance runner. She competed at the Athletics at the 2007 All-Africa Games – Women's 1500 metres as well as 2005 IAAF World Cross Country Championships – Junior women's race, 2006 IAAF World Cross Country Championships – Women's short race and 2007 IAAF World Cross Country Championships – Senior women's race.

Since 2017, she has been married to Caster Semenya, whom she first met in 2007. The couple has two children.
