= French Riviera Marathon =

Competitive running event

- Date: November
- Location: Nice – Cannes
- Event type: Road
- Distance: Marathon
- Primary sponsor: Département des Alpes-Maritimes
- Established: 2008
- Course records: Men's: 2:07:25 (2018) (Ethiopia) Abrha Milaw; Women's: 2:30:37 (2010) (Ethiopia) Radiya Roba
- Website: French Riviera Marathon
- Participants: 4,033 finishers (2021); 5,138 (2019); 5,027 (2018)

The French Riviera Marathon (French: Marathon Des Alpes-Maritimes) is a marathon held annually along the south east coast of France, between the cities of Nice and Cannes. The event was first held in 2008, when the race achieved its full capacity of 10,000 runners, setting a new world record attendance for an event on its debut. Although the race has only been competed since 2008, it trails only the Paris Marathon in terms of participation within France. In 2013, it was listed as an IAAF Bronze Label Road Race for the first time, a status it retained in 2014.

The race begins in the Albert I Garden in Nice, and then progresses along the French Riviera, visiting Saint-Laurent-du-Var, Cagnes-sur-Mer, Villeneuve-Loubet, Antibes, Juan-les-Pins and Golfe-Juan before arriving in Cannes and finishing on the Promenade de la Croisette, in front of the Carlton Cannes hotel. In addition to the full marathon, a "2 x 21.1 km" relay race was added in 2013, in which runners can race in pairs, with one person running the first half of the race, and then the other running the second half of the race. A six-person relay race is also run, with each leg of the race varying between 11 kilometres (6.8 miles) and 3 kilometres (1.9 miles).

In the men's races, Kenyan and Ethiopian athletes have won every race. Ethiopian runners have also been successful in the women's races. The first race was won by a Russian, Oksana Kuzmicheva.

== Results ==
French Riviera Marathon results
Year	Athlete	Nationality	Time (h:m:s)	Athlete	Nationality	Time (h:m:s)	Refs
Year	Male			Female			Refs
2021	Enock Onchari	Kenya	2:11:21	Claire Amann	France	2:56:24	
2019	Alemu Gemechu	Ethiopia	2:10:57	Alemitu Lema	Ethiopia	2:37:44	
2018	Abrha Milaw	Ethiopia	2:07:25	Nurit Shimels	Ethiopia	2:31:54	
2017	Dejene Kelkilew	Ethiopia	2:12:09	Tejitu Siyum	Ethiopia	2:33:21	
2016	Elisha Kipchirchir	Kenya	2:10:45	Konjit Tilahun	Ethiopia	2:37:56	
2015	Barnabas Kiptum	Kenya	2:10:44	Rose Jepchumba	Kenya	2:36:02	
2014	Shume Hailu	Ethiopia	2:09:27	Rose Jepchumba	Kenya	2:33:52	
2013	Abdisa Sori	Ethiopia	2:13:58	Salina Kosgei	Ethiopia	2:41:34	
2012	Eliud Magut	Kenya	2:10:32	Aregu Lechisa	Ethiopia	2:31:57	
2011	Lucas Kanda	Kenya	2:08:40	Teamo Shumye	Ethiopia	2:30:53	
2010	Tsegaye Botoru	Ethiopia	2:10:27	Radiya Roba	Ethiopia	2:30:37	
2009	Adelo Roba	Ethiopia	2:10:17	Merima Mohammed	Ethiopia	2:33:56	
2008	Jacob Kitur	Kenya	2:11:12	Oksana Kuzmicheva	Russia	2:37:10	
