= 2005 IAAF World Cross Country Championships – Junior men's race =

Junior men's race at the 2005 IAAF World Cross Country Championships
- Organisers: IAAF
- Edition: 33rd
- Date: March 20
- Host city: Saint-Galmier, Rhône-Alpes, France
- Venue: Hippodrome Joseph Desjoyaux
- Events: 1
- Distances: 8 km – Junior men
- Participation: 131 athletes from 37 nations

The Junior men's race at the 2005 IAAF World Cross Country Championships was held at the Hippodrome Joseph Desjoyaux in Saint-Galmier near Saint-Étienne, France, on March 20, 2005. Reports of the event were given in The New York Times, in the Herald, and for the IAAF.

Complete results for individuals, for teams, medallists, and the results of British athletes who took part were published.

== Race results ==
=== Junior men's race (8 km) ===
==== Individual ====
Rank	Athlete	Country	Time
1st place, gold medalist(s)	Augustine Choge	Kenya	23:59
2nd place, silver medalist(s)	Bernard Kiprop Kipyego	Kenya	24:00
3rd place, bronze medalist(s)	Barnabas Kosgei	Kenya	24:00
4	Hosea Macharinyang	Kenya	24:09
5	Mang'ata Ndiwa	Kenya	24:15
6	Tariku Bekele	Ethiopia	24:16
7	Moses Masai	Kenya	24:19
8	Solomon Molla	Ethiopia	24:24
9	Tariq Taher	Bahrain	24:31
10	Belal Ali	Bahrain	24:33
11	Chala Lemi	Ethiopia	24:34
12	Mekuria Tadesse	Ethiopia	24:35
13	Kabtamu Reta	Ethiopia	24:36
14	Nasser Shams Kareem	Qatar	24:40
15	Essa Ismail Rashed	Qatar	24:41
16	Kidane Tadasse	Eritrea	24:52
17	Samuel Tsegay	Eritrea	24:52
18	Kiflom Slum	Eritrea	24:56
19	Patrick Cherotwo	Uganda	24:59
20	Galen Rupp	United States	25:05
21	Moses Kipsiro	Uganda	25:06
22	Kamal Ali Thamer	Qatar	25:10
23	Adam Khamees	Bahrain	25:10
24	Moustafa Ahmed Shebto	Qatar	25:11
25	Eric Niyonsaba	Burundi	25:11
26	Mohammed Abduh Bakhet	Qatar	25:15
27	Saad Salem Malek	Qatar	25:17
28	Moses Aliwa	Uganda	25:21
29	Tshamano Setone	South Africa	25:27
30	Abdelati Iguider	Morocco	25:28
31	Ghebreslase Msgna Kflay	Eritrea	25:29
32	Satoru Kitamura	Japan	25:32
33	Abraham Niyonkuru	Burundi	25:32
34	Saleh Bakheet	Bahrain	25:42
35	Bader Khalil Ibrahim	Bahrain	25:45
36	Dušan Markešević	Serbia and Montenegro	25:48
37	Elmore Sibanda	Zimbabwe	25:54
38	Stuart Eagon	United States	25:57
39	Faissel Najjari	Morocco	26:05
40	Aleksey Chistov	Russia	26:07
41	Abidisa Desisa	Ethiopia	26:07
42	Nkosinoxolo Sonqibido	South Africa	26:08
43	Rabia Makhloufi	Algeria	26:11
44	Samir Khadar	Algeria	26:12
45	Eshaaq Abdeen	Bahrain	26:13
46	Christopher Landry	United States	26:13
47	Yuki Sato	Japan	26:21
48	Andrew Vernon	United Kingdom	26:22
49	Geoffrey Kusuro	Uganda	26:24
50	Hakon Devries	United States	26:33
51	Artem Yekimov	Russia	26:37
52	Hiroyuki Ono	Japan	26:40
53	Andrea Lalli	Italy	26:45
54	Abdelghani Aït Bahmad	Morocco	26:48
55	Takahiro Mori	Japan	26:48
56	Abdelaziz Ennaji El Idrissi	Morocco	26:49
57	Hidekazu Sato	Japan	26:49
58	Abdelkader Dali	Algeria	26:51
59	Braden Novakowski	Canada	26:51
60	Fedor Shutov	Russia	26:52
61	José Luis Galvan	Spain	26:53
62	Abdelghani Bensaadi	Algeria	26:54
63	Harutomo Kawano	Japan	26:55
64	Shafat Salad	New Zealand	27:00
65	Simone Gariboldi	Italy	27:04
66	Ruslan Nasyrov	Uzbekistan	27:09
67	Alvaro Rodríguez	Spain	27:10
68	Jeremy Mineau	United States	27:10
69	Iván Iglesias	Spain	27:11
70	Stepan Kiselev	Russia	27:13
71	Carlos Silva	Portugal	27:15
72	Isaac Kiprop	Uganda	27:18
73	Vusi Nkosi	South Africa	27:19
74	Andrey Petrov	Uzbekistan	27:22
75	Devis Licciardi	Italy	27:23
76	Alex Genest	Canada	27:26
77	Ryan Vail	United States	27:27
78	Jake Gallagher	Canada	27:28
79	Yuri Chechun	Kyrgyzstan	27:28
80	Danny Darcy	Ireland	27:28
81	Arkadiusz Gardzielewski	Poland	27:29
82	Artem Vdovenko	Russia	27:30
83	José España	Spain	27:31
84	John Tello	Colombia	27:34
85	Letlhogile Mashinini	South Africa	27:35
86	Ryan Stephenson	United Kingdom	27:39
87	Tim Hodge	New Zealand	27:39
88	Lubabalo Mqhele	South Africa	27:42
89	Jeremy Fisico	Canada	27:43
90	Denis Mayaud	France	27:43
91	Adam Hickey	United Kingdom	27:44
92	Martin Dematteis	Italy	27:45
93	Farid Terfia	Algeria	27:46
94	Joilson da Silva	Brazil	27:48
95	Khalid Choukoud	Netherlands	27:51
96	Roman Gusev	Russia	27:53
97	Chris Winter	Canada	27:56
98	Murad Nasser Ali Aboatef	Yemen	27:56
99	Iñaki Idoeta	Spain	27:58
100	Alison Gonçalves	Brazil	28:03
101	Keith Gerrard	United Kingdom	28:03
102	Franky Hernould	Belgium	28:14
103	Daniel Watts	United Kingdom	28:15
104	Hayden McLaren	New Zealand	28:17
105	Khaled Al-Bakhit	Jordan	28:18
106	Yoann Kowal	France	28:23
107	Anthony Saudrais	France	28:26
108	Yimharan Yosef	Israel	28:28
109	Maurizio Cito	Italy	28:29
110	Bernard Dematteis	Italy	28:34
111	Maarten Bosmans	Belgium	28:37
112	Nicholas Sunseri	Canada	28:41
113	David Martín	Spain	28:43
114	Maxime Fico	France	28:49
115	Blaz Zelic	Croatia	28:51
116	Paul Pollock	Ireland	28:53
117	Jason Dufresne	France	28:57
118	Martin Mashford	United Kingdom	28:59
119	Sotyvoldy Khaitov	Tajikistan	29:05
120	Dino Bozzone	New Zealand	29:13
121	Sergey Chabiarak	Belarus	29:21
122	Jean-Pierre Weerts	Belgium	29:29
123	Benjamin Malaty	France	29:37
124	Israel Mecabo	Brazil	31:17
125	Selwyn Dan Tamboo	Seychelles	32:33
—	Lahcen Bouharroud	Morocco	DNF
—	Said El Medouly	Morocco	DNF
—	Nuno Costa	Portugal	DNF
—	Ruann Etchechury	Brazil	DNF
—	El Hadj Ribouh	Algeria	DNF
—	Molefe Molefe	South Africa	DNF
—	Juan C. Morales	Puerto Rico	DNS

==== Teams ====
Rank	Team	Points
1st place, gold medalist(s)	Kenya: Augustine Choge / 1; Bernard Kiprop Kipyego / 2; Barnabas Kosgei / 3; Hosea Macharinyang / 4; (Mang'ata Ndiwa) / (5); (Moses Masai) / (7)	10
2nd place, silver medalist(s)	Ethiopia: Tariku Bekele / 6; Solomon Molla / 8; Chala Lemi / 11; Mekuria Tadesse / 12; (Kabtamu Reta) / (13); (Abidisa Desisa) / (41)	37
3rd place, bronze medalist(s)	Qatar: Nasser Shams Kareem / 14; Essa Ismail Rashed / 15; Kamal Ali Thamer / 22; Moustafa Ahmed Shebto / 24; (Mohammed Abduh Bakhet) / (26); (Saad Salem Malek) / (27)	75
4	Bahrain: Tariq Taher / 9; Belal Ali / 10; Adam Khamees / 23; Saleh Bakheet / 34; (Bader Khalil Ibrahim) / (35); (Eshaaq Abdeen) / (45)	76
5	Eritrea: Kidane Tadasse / 16; Samuel Tsegay / 17; Kiflom Slum / 18; Ghebreslase Msgna Kflay / 31	82
6	Uganda: Patrick Cherotwo / 19; Moses Kipsiro / 21; Moses Aliwa / 28; Geoffrey Kusuro / 49; (Isaac Kiprop) / (72)	117
7	United States: Galen Rupp / 20; Stuart Eagon / 38; Christopher Landry / 46; Hakon Devries / 50; (Jeremy Mineau) / (68); (Ryan Vail) / (77)	154
8	Morocco: Abdelati Iguider / 30; Faissel Najjari / 39; Abdelghani Aït Bahmad / 54; Abdelaziz Ennaji El Idrissi / 56; (Lahcen Bouharroud) / (DNF); (Said El Medouly) / (DNF)	179
9	Japan: Satoru Kitamura / 32; Yuki Sato / 47; Hiroyuki Ono / 52; Takahiro Mori / 55; (Hidekazu Sato) / (57); (Harutomo Kawano) / (63)	186
10	Algeria: Rabia Makhloufi / 43; Samir Khadar / 44; Abdelkader Dali / 58; Abdelghani Bensaadi / 62; (Farid Terfia) / (93); (El Hadj Ribouh) / (DNF)	207
11	Russia: Aleksey Chistov / 40; Artem Yekimov / 51; Fedor Shutov / 60; Stepan Kiselev / 70; (Artem Vdovenko) / (82); (Roman Gusev) / (96)	221
12	South Africa: Tshamano Setone / 29; Nkosinoxolo Sonqibido / 42; Vusi Nkosi / 73; Letlhogile Mashinini / 85; (Lubabalo Mqhele) / (88); (Molefe Molefe) / (DNF)	229
13	Spain: José Luis Galvan / 61; Alvaro Rodríguez / 67; Iván Iglesias / 69; José España / 83; (Iñaki Idoeta) / (99); (David Martín) / (113)	280
14	Italy: Andrea Lalli / 53; Simone Gariboldi / 65; Devis Licciardi / 75; Martin Dematteis / 92; (Maurizio Cito) / (109); (Bernard Dematteis) / (110)	285
15	Canada: Braden Novakowski / 59; Alex Genest / 76; Jake Gallagher / 78; Jeremy Fisico / 89; (Chris Winter) / (97); (Nicholas Sunseri) / (112)	302
16	United Kingdom: Andrew Vernon / 48; Ryan Stephenson / 86; Adam Hickey / 91; Keith Gerrard / 101; (Daniel Watts) / (103); (Martin Mashford) / (118)	326
17	New Zealand: Shafat Salad / 64; Tim Hodge / 87; Hayden McLaren / 104; Dino Bozzone / 120	375
18	France: Denis Mayaud / 90; Yoann Kowal / 106; Anthony Saudrais / 107; Maxime Fico / 114; (Jason Dufresne) / (117); (Benjamin Malaty) / (123)	417
DNF	Brazil: (Joilson da Silva) / (94); (Alison Gonçalves) / (100); (Israel Mecabo) / (124); (Ruann Etchechury) / (DNF)	DNF

- Note: Athletes in parentheses did not score for the team result.

== Participation ==
According to an unofficial count, 131 athletes from 37 countries participated in the Junior men's race. This is in agreement with the official numbers as published. The announced athlete from Puerto Rico did not show.

- Algeria (6)
- Bahrain (6)
- Belarus (1)
- Belgium (3)
- Brazil (4)
- Burundi (2)
- Canada (6)
- Colombia (1)
- Croatia (1)
- Eritrea (4)
- Ethiopia (6)
- France (6)
- Ireland (2)
- Israel (1)
- Italy (6)
- Japan (6)
- Jordan (1)
- Kenya (6)
- Kyrgyzstan (1)
- Morocco (6)
- Netherlands (1)
- New Zealand (4)
- Poland (1)
- Portugal (2)
- Qatar (6)
- Russia (6)
- Serbia and Montenegro (1)
- Seychelles (1)
- South Africa (6)
- Spain (6)
- Tajikistan (1)
- Uganda (5)
- United Kingdom (6)
- United States (6)
- Uzbekistan (2)
- Yemen (1)
- Zimbabwe (1)

== See also ==
- 2005 IAAF World Cross Country Championships – Senior men's race
- 2005 IAAF World Cross Country Championships – Men's short race
- 2005 IAAF World Cross Country Championships – Senior women's race
- 2005 IAAF World Cross Country Championships – Women's short race
- 2005 IAAF World Cross Country Championships – Junior women's race
