= Azzedine Zerdoum =

Algerian runner

Azzedine Zerdoum (born 31 December 1977 in El-Hamma-Mhenchela) is a retired Algerian runner who specializes in the cross-country running.

He competed at the World Cross Country Championships in 1999, 2002, 2003 and 2005. His best results came in the short race, where he finished 24th in 1999 and 23rd in 2003. In the team competition he finished fifth in 1999 and fifth in 2003.
