= 2005 IAAF World Cross Country Championships =

Coordinates: 45°35′56″N 4°17′42″E

- Organisers: IAAF
- Edition: 33rd
- Date: March 19/20
- Host city: Saint-Galmier, Rhône-Alpes, France
- Venue: Hippodrome Joseph Desjoyaux
- Events: 6
- Distances: 12.02 km – Senior men 4.196 km – Men's short 8 km – Junior men 8.108 km – Senior women 4.196 km – Women's short 6.153 km – Junior women
- Participation: 695 athletes from 72 nations

The 2005 IAAF World Cross Country Championships took place on March 19/20, 2005. The races were held at the Hippodrome Joseph Desjoyaux in Saint-Galmier near Saint-Étienne, France. Reports of the event were given in The New York Times, in the Herald, and for the IAAF.

Complete results for senior men, for senior men's teams, for men's short race, for men's short race teams, for junior men, for junior men's teams, senior women, for senior women's teams, for women's short race, for women's short race teams, for junior women, for junior women's teams, medallists, and the results of British athletes who took part were published.

== Medallists ==
Event	Gold		Silver		Bronze	
Individual
Senior men (12.02 km)	Kenenisa Bekele; Ethiopia	35:06	Zersenay Tadesse; Eritrea	35:20	Abdullah Ahmed Hassan; Qatar	35:34
Men's short (4.196 km)	Kenenisa Bekele; Ethiopia	11:33	Abraham Chebii; Kenya	11:38	Isaac Songok; Kenya	11:39
Junior men (8 km)	Augustine Choge; Kenya	23:59	Bernard Kiprop Kipyego; Kenya	24:00	Barnabas Kosgei; Kenya	24:00
Senior women (8.108 km)	Tirunesh Dibaba; Ethiopia	26:34	Alice Timbilil; Kenya	26:37	Worknesh Kidane; Ethiopia	26:37
Women's short (4.196 km)	Tirunesh Dibaba; Ethiopia	13:15	Worknesh Kidane; Ethiopia	13:16	Isabella Ochichi; Kenya	13:21
Junior women (6.153 km)	Gelete Burka; Ethiopia	20:12	Veronica Wanjiru; Kenya	20:39	Beatrice Chebusit; Kenya	20:44
Team
Senior men	Ethiopia	24	Kenya	35	Qatar	42
Men's short	Ethiopia	23	Kenya	31	Qatar	32
Junior men	Kenya	10	Ethiopia	37	Qatar	75
Senior women	Ethiopia	16	Kenya	22	Portugal	86
Women's short	Ethiopia	18	Kenya	19	United States	67
Junior women	Kenya	16	Ethiopia	22	Japan	56

== Race results ==
=== Senior men's race (12.02 km) ===
Individual race
Rank	Athlete	Country	Time
1st place, gold medalist(s)	Kenenisa Bekele	Ethiopia	35:06
2nd place, silver medalist(s)	Zersenay Tadesse	Eritrea	35:20
3rd place, bronze medalist(s)	Abdullah Ahmed Hassan	Qatar	35:34
4	Abebe Dinkessa	Ethiopia	35:37
5	Eliud Kipchoge	Kenya	35:37
6	Dejene Berhanu	Ethiopia	35:42
7	Boniface Kiprop	Uganda	35:45
8	Saif Saaeed Shaheen	Qatar	35:53
9	John Cheruiyot Korir	Kenya	36:00
10	Charles Kamathi	Kenya	36:03
11	Wilberforce Talel	Kenya	36:07
12	Jamal Bilal Salem	Qatar	36:28
Full results

Teams
Rank	Team	Points
1st place, gold medalist(s)	Ethiopia: Kenenisa Bekele / 1; Abebe Dinkessa / 4; Dejene Berhanu / 6; Eshetu Gezhagne / 13; (Tessema Absher) / (30); (Gebre-egziabher Gebremariam) / (DNF)	24
2nd place, silver medalist(s)	Kenya: Eliud Kipchoge / 5; John Cheruiyot Korir / 9; Charles Kamathi / 10; Wilberforce Talel / 11; (Moses Mosop) / (18); (Abraham Cherono) / (23)	35
3rd place, bronze medalist(s)	Qatar: Abdullah Ahmed Hassan / 3; Saif Saaeed Shaheen / 8; Jamal Bilal Salem / 12; Ali Al-Dawoodi / 19; (Majid Aman Awadh) / (28); (Sultan Khamis Zaman) / (DNF)	42
4	Eritrea	54
5	Algeria	166
6	Uganda	182
7	Spain	184
8	Portugal	212
Full results

- Note: Athletes in parentheses did not score for the team result.

=== Men's short race (4.196 km) ===
Individual race
Rank	Athlete	Country	Time
1st place, gold medalist(s)	Kenenisa Bekele	Ethiopia	11:33
2nd place, silver medalist(s)	Abraham Chebii	Kenya	11:38
3rd place, bronze medalist(s)	Isaac Songok	Kenya	11:39
4	Saif Saaeed Shaheen	Qatar	11:42
5	Jamal Bilal Salem	Qatar	11:43
6	Maregu Zewdie	Ethiopia	11:43
7	Dejene Berhanu	Ethiopia	11:43
8	Abdullah Ahmed Hassan	Qatar	11:46
9	Gebre-egziabher Gebremariam	Ethiopia	11:54
10	Shadrack Kosgei	Kenya	11:56
11	Adil Kaouch	Morocco	11:57
12	Abera Chane	Ethiopia	11:58
Full results

Teams
Rank	Team	Points
1st place, gold medalist(s)	Ethiopia: Kenenisa Bekele / 1; Maregu Zewdie / 6; Dejene Berhanu / 7; Gebre-egziabher Gebremariam / 9; (Abera Chane) / (12); (Mohamed Awol) / (26)	23
2nd place, silver medalist(s)	Kenya: Abraham Chebii / 2; Isaac Songok / 3; Shadrack Kosgei / 10; Henry Kipchirchir / 16; (Sammy Kipketer) / (17); (Brimin Kipruto) / (37)	31
3rd place, bronze medalist(s)	Qatar: Saif Saaeed Shaheen / 4; Jamal Bilal Salem / 5; Abdullah Ahmed Hassan / 8; James Kwalia / 15; (Sultan Khamis Zaman) / (19); (Khamis Abdulla Saifeldin) / (35)	32
4	Morocco	65
5	Algeria	112
6	Zimbabwe	163
7	Tanzania	176
8	Spain	191
Full results

- Note: Athletes in parentheses did not score for the team result.

=== Junior men's race (8 km) ===
Individual race
Rank	Athlete	Country	Time
1st place, gold medalist(s)	Augustine Choge	Kenya	23:59
2nd place, silver medalist(s)	Bernard Kiprop Kipyego	Kenya	24:00
3rd place, bronze medalist(s)	Barnabas Kosgei	Kenya	24:00
4	Hosea Macharinyang	Kenya	24:09
5	Mang'ata Ndiwa	Kenya	24:15
6	Tariku Bekele	Ethiopia	24:16
7	Moses Masai	Kenya	24:19
8	Solomon Molla	Ethiopia	24:24
9	Tariq Taher	Bahrain	24:31
10	Belal Ali	Bahrain	24:33
11	Chala Lemi	Ethiopia	24:34
12	Mekuria Tadesse	Ethiopia	24:35
Full results

Teams
Rank	Team	Points
1st place, gold medalist(s)	Kenya: Augustine Choge / 1; Bernard Kiprop Kipyego / 2; Barnabas Kosgei / 3; Hosea Macharinyang / 4; (Mang'ata Ndiwa) / (5); (Moses Masai) / (7)	10
2nd place, silver medalist(s)	Ethiopia: Tariku Bekele / 6; Solomon Molla / 8; Chala Lemi / 11; Mekuria Tadesse / 12; (Kabtamu Reta) / (13); (Abidisa Desisa) / (41)	37
3rd place, bronze medalist(s)	Qatar: Nasser Shams Kareem / 14; Essa Ismail Rashed / 15; Kamal Ali Thamer / 22; Moustafa Ahmed Shebto / 24; (Mohammed Abduh Bakhet) / (26); (Saad Salem Malek) / (27)	75
4	Bahrain	76
5	Eritrea	82
6	Uganda	117
7	United States	154
8	Morocco	179
Full results

- Note: Athletes in parentheses did not score for the team result.

=== Senior women's race (8.108 km) ===
Individual race
Rank	Athlete	Country	Time
1st place, gold medalist(s)	Tirunesh Dibaba	Ethiopia	26:34
2nd place, silver medalist(s)	Alice Timbilil	Kenya	26:37
3rd place, bronze medalist(s)	Worknesh Kidane	Ethiopia	26:37
4	Meselech Melkamu	Ethiopia	26:39
5	Isabella Ochichi	Kenya	26:43
6	Catherine Kirui	Kenya	26:49
7	Benita Johnson	Australia	26:55
8	Gete Wami	Ethiopia	27:20
9	Rose Jepchumba	Kenya	27:25
10	Bezunesh Bekele	Ethiopia	27:27
11	Irene Kipchumba	Kenya	27:29
12	Kim Smith	New Zealand	27:37
Full results

Teams
Rank	Team	Points
1st place, gold medalist(s)	Ethiopia: Tirunesh Dibaba / 1; Worknesh Kidane / 3; Meselech Melkamu / 4; Gete Wami / 8; (Bezunesh Bekele) / (10); (Merima Hashim) / (14)	16
2nd place, silver medalist(s)	Kenya: Alice Timbilil / 2; Isabella Ochichi / 5; Catherine Kirui / 6; Rose Jepchumba / 9; (Irene Kipchumba) / (11); (Irene Limika) / (18)	22
3rd place, bronze medalist(s)	Portugal: Anália Rosa / 15; Ana Dias / 21; Mónica Rosa / 24; Inês Monteiro / 26; (Adélia Elias) / (61); (Fernanda Miranda) / (74)	86
4	Japan	122
5	United States	122
6	United Kingdom	129
7	France	129
8	Australia	134
Full results

- Note: Athletes in parentheses did not score for the team result.

=== Women's short race (4.196 km) ===
Individual race
Rank	Athlete	Country	Time
1st place, gold medalist(s)	Tirunesh Dibaba	Ethiopia	13:15
2nd place, silver medalist(s)	Worknesh Kidane	Ethiopia	13:16
3rd place, bronze medalist(s)	Isabella Ochichi	Kenya	13:21
4	Prisca Ngetich	Kenya	13:25
5	Lucy Wangui	Kenya	13:25
6	Meselech Melkamu	Ethiopia	13:28
7	Beatrice Chepchumba	Kenya	13:31
8	Nancy Jebet Lagat	Kenya	13:31
9	Deriba Alemu	Ethiopia	13:41
10	Alevtina Ivanova	Russia	13:42
11	Lauren Fleshman	United States	13:44
12	Bezunesh Bekele	Ethiopia	13:44
Full results

Teams
Rank	Team	Points
1st place, gold medalist(s)	Ethiopia: Tirunesh Dibaba / 1; Worknesh Kidane / 2; Meselech Melkamu / 6; Deriba Alemu / 9; (Bezunesh Bekele) / (12); (Ejagayehu Dibaba) / (14)	18
2nd place, silver medalist(s)	Kenya: Isabella Ochichi / 3; Prisca Ngetich / 4; Lucy Wangui / 5; Beatrice Chepchumba / 7; (Nancy Jebet Lagat) / (8); (Viola Kibiwott) / (23)	19
3rd place, bronze medalist(s)	United States: Lauren Fleshman / 11; Blake Russell / 15; Shalane Flanagan / 20; Shayne Culpepper / 21; (Amy Mortimer) / (52); (Melissa Buttry) / (90)	67
4	Russia	100
5	Morocco	132
6	Portugal	134
7	Australia	143
8	France	182
Full results

- Note: Athletes in parentheses did not score for the team result.

=== Junior women's race (6.153 km) ===
Individual race
Rank	Athlete	Country	Time
1st place, gold medalist(s)	Gelete Burka	Ethiopia	20:12
2nd place, silver medalist(s)	Veronica Wanjiru	Kenya	20:39
3rd place, bronze medalist(s)	Beatrice Chebusit	Kenya	20:44
4	Mercy Njoroge	Kenya	20:46
5	Belainesh Zemedkun	Ethiopia	20:47
6	Workitu Ayanu	Ethiopia	20:54
7	Pauline Korikwiang	Kenya	20:56
8	Gladys Chemweno	Kenya	20:57
9	Aliphine Tuliamuk	Kenya	21:09
10	Alemitu Abera	Ethiopia	21:10
11	Akane Wakita	Japan	21:16
12	Azalech Masresha	Ethiopia	21:37
Full results

Teams
Rank	Team	Points
1st place, gold medalist(s)	Kenya: Veronica Wanjiru / 2; Beatrice Chebusit / 3; Mercy Njoroge / 4; Pauline Korikwiang / 7; (Gladys Chemweno) / (8); (Aliphine Tuliamuk) / (9)	16
2nd place, silver medalist(s)	Ethiopia: Gelete Burka / 1; Belainesh Zemedkun / 5; Workitu Ayanu / 6; Alemitu Abera / 10; (Azalech Masresha) / (12)	22
3rd place, bronze medalist(s)	Japan: Akane Wakita / 11; Hitomi Niiya / 13; Yurika Nakamura / 15; Kazue Kojima / 17; (Maya Iino) / (24); (Yuri Suzuki) / (25)	56
4	United States	118
5	Morocco	135
6	Tanzania	172
7	Algeria	177
8	United Kingdom	185
Full results

- Note: Athletes in parentheses did not score for the team result.

== Medal table (unofficial) ==
Rank	Nation	Gold	Silver	Bronze	Total
1	Ethiopia	9	3	1	13
2	Kenya	3	8	4	15
3	Eritrea	0	1	0	1
4	Qatar	0	0	4	4
5	Japan	0	0	1	1
5	Portugal	0	0	1	1
5	United States	0	0	1	1
Totals (7 entries)		12	12	12	36

- Note: Totals include both individual and team medals, with medals in the team competition counting as one medal.

== Participation ==
According to an unofficial count, 695 athletes from 72 countries participated. This is in agreement with the official numbers as published.

- Algeria (23)
- Andorra (1)
- Argentina (5)
- Australia (16)
- Bahrain (11)
- Belarus (7)
- Belgium (15)
- Bermuda (1)
- Botswana (4)
- Brazil (12)
- Burundi (6)
- Canada (34)
- Central African Republic (2)
- Chile (2)
- China (6)
- Colombia (2)
- Côte d'Ivoire (1)
- Croatia (1)
- Czech Republic (1)
- Ecuador (4)
- Egypt (5)
- Eritrea (19)
- Estonia (4)
- Ethiopia (28)
- France (36)
- Germany (2)
- Greece (2)
- Guatemala (3)
- Ireland (14)
- Israel (1)
- Italy (30)
- Japan (29)
- Jordan (2)
- Kazakhstan (3)
- Kenya (35)
- Kyrgyzstan (2)
- Lesotho (2)
- Mexico (7)
- Mongolia (1)
- Morocco (30)
- Namibia (3)
- Netherlands (2)
- New Zealand (13)
- Peru (4)
- Philippines (2)
- Poland (4)
- Portugal (25)
- Puerto Rico (1)
- Qatar (14)
- Romania (5)
- Russia (18)
- Rwanda (5)
- Senegal (1)
- Serbia and Montenegro (2)
- Seychelles (2)
- Slovenia (1)
- South Africa (21)
- Spain (36)
- Switzerland (6)
- Tajikistan (3)
- Tanzania (13)
- Tunisia (4)
- Turkey (1)
- Uganda (11)
- Ukraine (1)
- United Kingdom (33)
- United States (36)
- Uruguay (1)
- Uzbekistan (6)
- Venezuela (1)
- Yemen (3)
- Zimbabwe (8)

== See also ==
- 2005 IAAF World Cross Country Championships – Senior men's race
- 2005 IAAF World Cross Country Championships – Men's short race
- 2005 IAAF World Cross Country Championships – Junior men's race
- 2005 IAAF World Cross Country Championships – Senior women's race
- 2005 IAAF World Cross Country Championships – Women's short race
- 2005 IAAF World Cross Country Championships – Junior women's race
- 2005 in athletics (track and field)
