= Mónica Rosa =

Portuguese runner (born 1978)

Mónica Rosa (born 5 May 1978 in Torres Vedras) is a Portuguese runner who specializes in the longer track distances as well as cross-country running and half marathon.

At the 2001 World Championships in Athletics she ran for Portugal in the 5000 metres but did not make the final. She was the 2002 winner of the Cross Internacional de Itálica. She suffered a serious injury in early 2006 and her future as an elite performer seemed in doubt. However, she came back strongly and won the 2007 Oeiras International Cross Country, beating reigning Portuguese champion Jessica Augusto to the finish line. She and Augusto led the Portuguese women to the team bronze medal at the 2007 European Cross Country Championships later that year.

She made her debut over the marathon at the 2010 Paris Marathon and completed the race in a time of 2:37:09. She represented Portugal in the event at the 2010 European Athletics Championships, but did not manage to finish the race. Rosa returned to cross country and won at the Cross de la Constitución in December.

== Achievements ==
Year	Competition	Venue	Position	Event	Notes
Representing Portugal
1999	World Cross Country Championships	Belfast, Northern Ireland	43rd	Long race (8.012 km)	30:16
1999	World Cross Country Championships	Belfast, Northern Ireland	3rd	Team competition	94 pts
1999	European U23 Championships	Gothenburg, Sweden	4th	5000m	15:43.22
2001	World Cross Country Championships	Ostend, Belgium	30th	Long race (7.7 km)	30:13
2001	World Cross Country Championships	Ostend, Belgium	5th	Team competition	95 pts
2002	European Championships	Munich, Germany	23rd	10,000 m	32:59.22
2003	World Cross Country Championships	Lausanne, Switzerland	23rd	Short race (4.03 km)	13:29
2003	World Cross Country Championships	Lausanne, Switzerland	6th	Team competition	100 pts
2005	World Cross Country Championships	Saint-Etienne, France	24th	Long race (8.108 km)	28:45
2005	World Cross Country Championships	Saint-Etienne, France	3rd	Team competition	86 pts

=== Personal bests ===
- 1500 metres - 4:15.40 min (2000)
- 3000 metres - 8:56.58 min (2001)
- 5000 metres - 15:21.01 min (2001)
- 10,000 metres - 32:22.25 min (2001)
- Half marathon - 1:13:09 hrs (2006)
- Marathon - 2:37:09 hrs (2010)
