= Michela Zanatta =

Italian racer (born 1978)

Personal information
- National team: Italy (7 caps)
- Born: 15 January 1978 (age 48) Montebelluna, Italy

Sport
- Country: Italy
- Sport: Athletics
- Event: Middle-distance running
- Club: Atletica Ponzano
- Coached by: Matteo Grosso

Achievements and titles
- Personal bests: 3000 m: 9:09.83 (2000); 3000 m indoor: 9:14.04 (2005)

Michela Zanatta (born 17 May 1978) is a former Italian female middle-distance runner who competed at two editions of the IAAF World Cross Country Championships at senior level (2004, 2005).

== Biography ==
She won five national championships at senior level.

== National titles ==
- Italian Athletics Indoor Championships
  - 1500 m: 2003, 2004
  - 3000 m: 2001, 2003, 2004
