= Lucy Wangui Kabuu =

Kenyan athlete

Personal information
- Nationality: Kenyan
- Born: March 24, 1984 (age 42)

Lucy Wangui Kabuu
Medal record

Women's athletics

Representing Kenya

Commonwealth Games
Gold medal – first place	2006 Melbourne	10,000 m
Bronze medal – third place	2006 Melbourne	5000 m

Lucy Wangūi Kabuu (born 24 March 1984) is a Kenyan long-distance runner who specializes in the 5000 and 10,000 metres events. She has represented Kenya twice at the Summer Olympics, finishing in the top ten of the 10,000 m race in both 2004 and 2008. Her personal bests of 14:33.49 minutes for the 5000 m and 30:39.96 minutes for the 10,000 m make her one of Kenya's fastest ever runners in the events.

She was based in Japan for her early career. Internationally, she was a team silver medallist at the IAAF World Cross Country Championships in 2005 and was a double long-distance medalist at the 2006 Commonwealth Games (where she was the 10,000 m champion and 5000 m bronze medallist). Since 2011 she has competed on the road and has won at the Great North Run and the Delhi Half Marathon. She made her marathon debut in 2012 and became the eighth fastest woman ever with a time of 2:19:34 hours for second place at the Dubai Marathon.

Wangūi was issued with a two-year competition ban in 2018 after failing a doping test at the Milano City Marathon at which she had initially been recorded in first place.

== Career ==
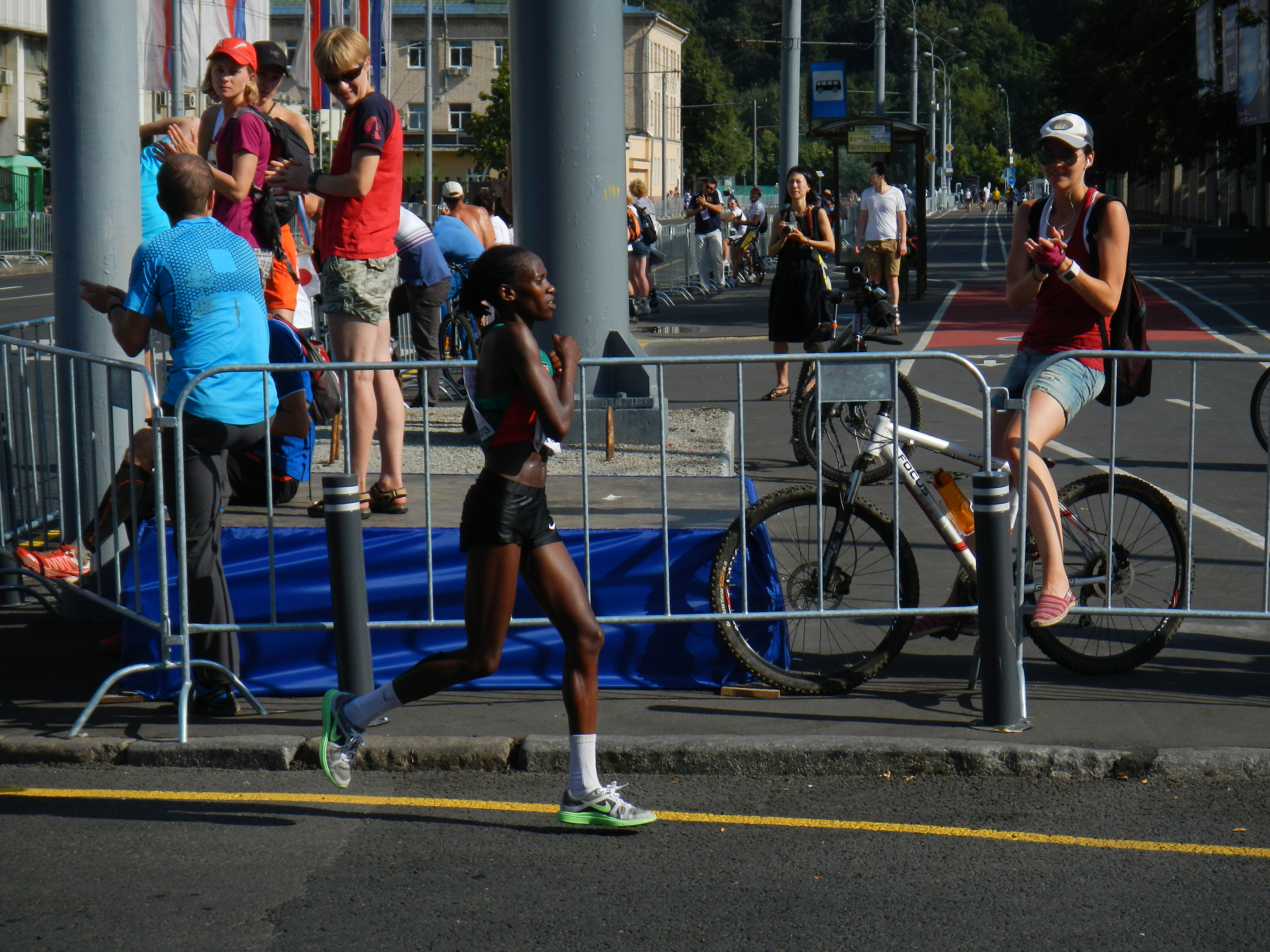
Lucy Wangui Kabuu during 2013 World Championships in Athletics – Women's Marathon in Moscow.

She was born in 1984 in Ichamara in the Mukurweini/Nyeri region of central Kenya. Her potential for long-distance running was identified when she was at primary school. John Kanyi, a local runner who was based in Japan, encouraged her to try for an athletic scholarship to enable her to study and train there as well. She performed well in the scholarship selection races and, aged sixteen, won a place at Aomori Yamada High School.

While in Japan, she won the 1500 metres at the high school championships and, after graduation in 2002, she commenced training with the Suzuki Track and Field Club. She signed with PACE Sports Management and is coached by Ricky Simms. Wangui set a Kenyan junior record for the 10,000 m in September 2003. She won the All-Japan Corporate Half Marathon title in Yamaguchi the following March.

She came first in the 5000 metres at the 2004 Japanese Athletics Championships, competing as a guest. Following this she was the runner-up in the Kenyan Olympic trials over 10,000 m. Her first major international appearance came at the 2004 Olympics in Athens, where she finished ninth in the 10,000 metres event. She ran over that distance at the Hyogo Relays meet and had three straight wins from 2005 to 2007. She finished tenth in 5000 metres at the 2005 World Athletics Final. Wangūi made her international debut on grass that year at the 2005 IAAF World Cross Country Championships, where her fifth-place finish in the short race made the Kenyan team a close second to Ethiopia in the team rankings.

In March 2006 she won the women's 10,000 metres event at the 2006 Commonwealth Games with a time of 31 minutes, 29.66 seconds. She also finished third in the 5000 metres. Towards the end of the season she finished tenth in 3000 metres at the World Athletics Final. In November she was selected for the Kenyan women's team at the International Chiba Ekiden. She was slower than Maria Konovalova on the final leg, but maintained Kenya's lead to win the women's title. The team's time of 2:13:35 hours was later ratified as an African record for the ekiden marathon relay.

Wangūi began her 2008 season with a win at the Chiba International Cross Country. At the 2008 African Championships in Athletics she finished fourth in 10,000 m behind a trio of Ethiopian's led by Tirunesh Dibaba. At the national Olympic trials she won the 10,000 m and came second over 5000 m. Despite her wish to compete in both events, the Kenyan selectors instead chose her just for the 10,000 m, choosing Vivian Cheruiyot for the shorter distance instead. In her second outing on the Olympic stage at the 2008 Beijing Games she finished seventh in the 10,000 metres, running a personal best time of 30:39.96 minutes.

After a competitive break in 2009 and 2010, due to an Achilles tendon injury then pregnancy, she returned to action on the road running circuit. She had wins at the Great North Run half marathon and the Great Edinburgh Run 10K in September and October. She then travelled to the Delhi Half Marathon and won in a personal best of 1:07:04 hours ahead of fellow Kenyan Sharon Cherop.

She made her debut over the marathon distance in January 2012 at the Dubai Marathon. In one of the fastest races ever at that point, she completed the race in 2:19:34 hours to take second place just three seconds behind defending champion Aselefech Mergia. This was among the fastest ever debuts by a woman and ranked her eighth in the all-time lists. She placed fifth at the 2012 London Marathon in April, but missed out on the 2012 London Olympics as she failed to finish in the 10,000 m trial race at the Prefontaine Classic. In her third marathon of the year, she reached the podium with a third-place finish at the 2012 Chicago Marathon. She won the 2013 Ras Al Khaimah Half Marathon with a new personal best of 1:06:09, just 19 seconds off Mary Keitany's world record.

Kabuu ran the third fastest ever time over 25 kilometres to win the BIG 25 Berlin in May, crossing the line in 1:21:37 hours. She was selected for the Kenyan marathon team at the 2013 World Championships in Athletics but performed poorly in Moscow, finishing 24th in a time of 2:44:06 hours. He last outing that year was a third-place finish at the Delhi Half Marathon.

== Personal bests ==
Event	Time (h:m:s)	Venue	Date
3000 m	8:46.15	Gateshead, England	2008
5000 m	14:33.49	Oslo, Norway	2008
10,000 m	30:39.96	Beijing, China	2008
10 km (road)	31:41	Glasgow, Scotland	2008
Half marathon	66:09	Ras Al Khaimah, UAE	2013
Marathon	2:19:34	Dubai, UAE	2012

- All information taken from IAAF profile.
