= Anna Thompson (runner) =

Australian long-distance runner

Anna Thompson (born 11 December 1976 in Melbourne) is an Australian runner who specializes in cross-country running.

== Achievements ==
Year	Tournament	Venue	Result	Extra
2002	Commonwealth Games	Manchester, England	9th	5000 m
2002	World Cross Country Championships	Dublin, Ireland	15th	Short race
2002	World Cross Country Championships	Dublin, Ireland	5th	Team competition
2005	World Cross Country Championships	St Etienne, France	19th	Short race
2005	World Cross Country Championships	St Etienne, France	7th	Team competition
2005	World Cross Country Championships	St Etienne, France	16th	Long race
2005	World Cross Country Championships	St Etienne, France	8th	Team competition
2006	Commonwealth Games	Melbourne, Australia	5th	10,000 m
2006	World Cross Country Championships	Fukuoka, Japan	3rd	Team competition
2006	World Road Running Championships	Debrecen, Hungary	18th	20 km run
2007	World Cross Country Championships	Mombasa, Kenya	18th	Senior race
2007	World Cross Country Championships	Mombasa, Kenya	6th	Team competition
2008	World Cross Country Championships	Edinburgh, Scotland	3rd	Team competition

=== Personal bests ===
- 1500 metres – 4:16.51 min (2005)
- 3000 metres – 8:58.93 min (2006)
- 5000 metres – 15:42.31 min (2004)
- 10,000 metres – 32:27.74 min (2006)
- Half marathon – 1:11:38 min (2007)
- Marathon – 2:33:20 min (2005)
