= Julia Viellehner =

German athletics competitor

Personal information
- Born: 6 September 1985 Benediktbeuern, Germany
- Died: 22 May 2017 (aged 31) Maurizio Bufalini Hospital, Cesena, Italy
- Height: 1.64 m (5 ft 5 in)
- Weight: 52 kg (115 lb)

Sport
- Country: Germany
- Event(s): Duathlon; Triathlon
- Club: TSV Altenmarkt
- Partner: Tom Stecher (2016 - her death)
Medal record
Duathlon
Representing Germany
World Duathlon Championships
Silver medal – second place	2015 Zofingen	Women's elite

Julia Viellehner (6 September 1985 – 22 May 2017) was a German long-distance duathlete and triathlete who competed in long-distance world duathlon and triathlon championships.

== Personal life ==
Viellehner was brought up in a family of athletes in Winhöring, Upper Bavaria. Her father Johann was a summiteer and her mother Irmgard was a keen marathon runner. Julia was appointed into the Bavarian national athletics team and in 2004 won her first German national championship. In 2014, her family were distressed when her brother Raphael and her father disappeared when they went hiking on a mountain tour on Aoraki / Mount Cook in New Zealand. They were never found.

== Accident ==
Viellehner was involved in a traffic accident involving a heavy goods vehicle during a cycling training session. The vehicle overtook her and pulled in sharply, the wheel of the truck caught her bike's front wheel causing her to go under the truck. She suffered severe injuries and was put into a medically induced coma for a week before she died.
