= Catherine Kirui =

Kenyan long-distance runner

Medal record

Women's athletics

Representing Kenya

African Championships
Bronze medal – third place	2004 Brazzaville	10,000 m

Catherine Kirui (born 1 March 1976) is a retired Kenyan long-distance runner who won a bronze medal at the African Championships in Athletics in 2004.

== International competitions ==
Year	Competition	Venue	Position	Event	Notes
2004	African Championships	Brazzaville, Congo	3rd	10,000 m	
2005	World Cross Country Championships	Saint-Etienne, France	6th	Long race	
2005	World Cross Country Championships	Saint-Etienne, France	2nd	Team competition	

== Personal bests ==
- 3000 metres - 9:12.05 min (1994)
- 5000 metres - 15:43.22 min (1995)
- 10,000 metres - 32:16.5 min (2004)
- Half marathon - 1:10:38 min (2004)
