= Cuthbert Nyasango =

Zimbabwean long-distance runner

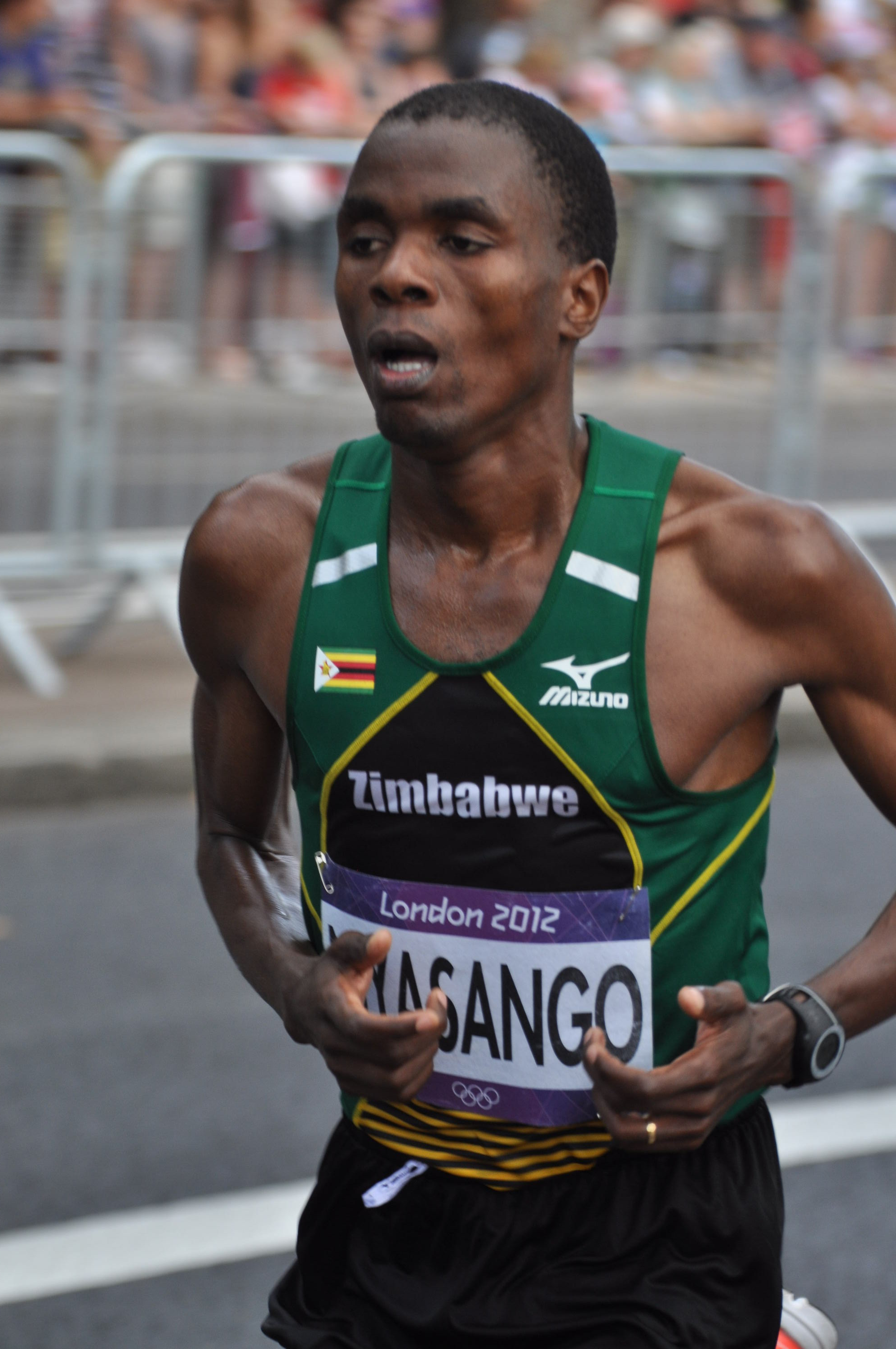
- Cuthbert Nyasango in the marathon at the 2012 Olympics in London

Personal information
- Born: 17 September 1982 (age 43)
- Height: 1.63 m (5 ft 4 in)
- Weight: 56 kg (123 lb)

Sport
- Country: Zimbabwe
- Sport: Athletics
- Event: Marathon
- Coached by: Benson Chauke
- Updated on 28 July 2012

Cuthbert Nyasango (born 17 September 1982) is a Zimbabwean long-distance runner. He was born in Nyanga. Nyasango competed for Zimbabwe at the 2012 Summer Olympics in London where he placed seventh in the marathon and was the flag bearer for his country at the Closing Ceremony on 12 August 2012.

== Achievements ==
Year	Tournament	Venue	Result	Extra
2000	World Junior Championships	Santiago, Chile	7th	5000 m
2005	World Cross Country Championships	St Etienne, France	20th	Short race
2005	World Cross Country Championships	St Etienne, France	16th	Long race
2006	World Road Running Championships	Debrecen, Hungary	13th	20 km
2007	World Cross Country Championships	Mombasa, Kenya	21st	Senior race
2012	2012 London Olympic Games	London, Great Britain	7th	Marathon
2015	World Championships	Beijing, China	23rd	Marathon

=== Personal bests ===
- 1500 metres – 3:50.26 min (2003)
- 3000 metres – 7:51.29 min (2005)
- 5000 metres – 13:31.27 min (2007)
- 10,000 metres – 27:57.34 (2007) – national record
- Half marathon – 1:00:26 hrs (2007)
- Marathon – 2:09:52 hrs (2014)
