= Moiben =

Settlement in Moiben Constituency, Kenya

- Location within Kenya
- Coordinates: 0.82°N 35.38°E
- Country: Kenya
- Province: Rift Valley Province
- Time zone: UTC+3 (EAT)

Moiben is a settlement in Moiben Constituency, of Uasin Gishu County of Kenya's former Rift Valley Province.
