= Shadrack Kosgei =

Kenyan runner

Shadrack Kosgei (born 24 November 1984 in Uasin Gishu) is a Kenyan runner.

At the 2005 World Cross Country Championships he finished tenth in the short race. The Kenyan team, of which Kosgei was a part, won the silver medal in the team competition.

He is based at the PACE Sports Management training camp in Kaptagat.
