= Dejene Berhanu =

Ethiopian runner athlete

Personal information
- Born: December 12, 1980; Addis Alem, Ethiopia
- Died: August 29, 2010 (aged 29); Ethiopia
- Height: 1.84 m (6 ft 0 in)
- Weight: 64 kg (141 lb)

Sport
- Country: Ethiopia
- Sport: Running
- Event: 5000 metres
- Turned pro: 2004

Achievements and titles
- Olympic finals: 2004 Summer Olympics: 5000 m – 5th
Medal record
Men's athletics
Representing Ethiopia
African Championships
Silver medal – second place	2000 Algiers	10,000 m

Dejene Berhanu (December 12, 1980 – August 29, 2010) was a male Ethiopian runner, who specialized in the 5000 metres.

Berhanu finished 11th in the short race at the 2004 World Cross Country Championships and fifth in the 5000 at the Athens Olympics. He followed that up with a pair of strong finishes at the World Cross Country Championships the next year. Berhanu was seventh in the short race and sixth in the long race. He ran in the 5000 again at the World Championships at Helsinki, finishing eighth.

In 2006, Berhanu turned to focus on the marathon. He eschewed cross country for the Rotterdam Marathon, where he finished fourth in a time of 2:08:46. He ran the Chicago Marathon in the fall as a last-minute replacement for favourite Felix Limo. Running with the leaders through the halfway mark in a blistering 63:15, Berhanu faded after 30 km and finished ninth in a time of 2:12:27.

== Death ==
Berhanu died by suicide on August 29, 2010, in Ethiopia, at age 29.

== Achievements ==
Year	Competition	Venue	Position	Event	Notes
Representing Ethiopia
2000	African Championships	Algiers, Algeria	2nd	10,000 m	
2003	All-Africa Games	Abuja, Nigeria	3rd	10,000 m	
2003	World Athletics Final	Monte Carlo, Monaco	6th	5000 m	
2004	World Cross Country Championships	Brussels, Belgium	11th	Short race	
2004	Olympic Games	Athens, Greece	5th	5000 m	
2004	World Athletics Final	Monte Carlo, Monaco	2nd	5000 m	
2005	World Cross Country Championships	Saint-Galmier, France	7th	Short race	
2005	World Cross Country Championships	Saint-Galmier, France	6th	Long race	
2005	World Championships	Helsinki, Finland	8th	5000 m	
2007	World Championships	Osaka, Japan	31st	Marathon	2:27:50

=== Personal bests ===
- 3000 metres – 8:06.56 (2002)
- 5000 metres – 12:54.15 (2004)
- 10,000 metres – 27:12.22 (2005)
- Marathon – 2:08:46 (2006)

Sporting positions
Preceded by (South Africa) Hendrick Ramaala	Men's Half Marathon Best Year Performance; 2004	Succeeded by (Eritrea) Zersenay Tadese
