= Bezunesh Bekele =

Ethiopian long-distance runner (born 1983)

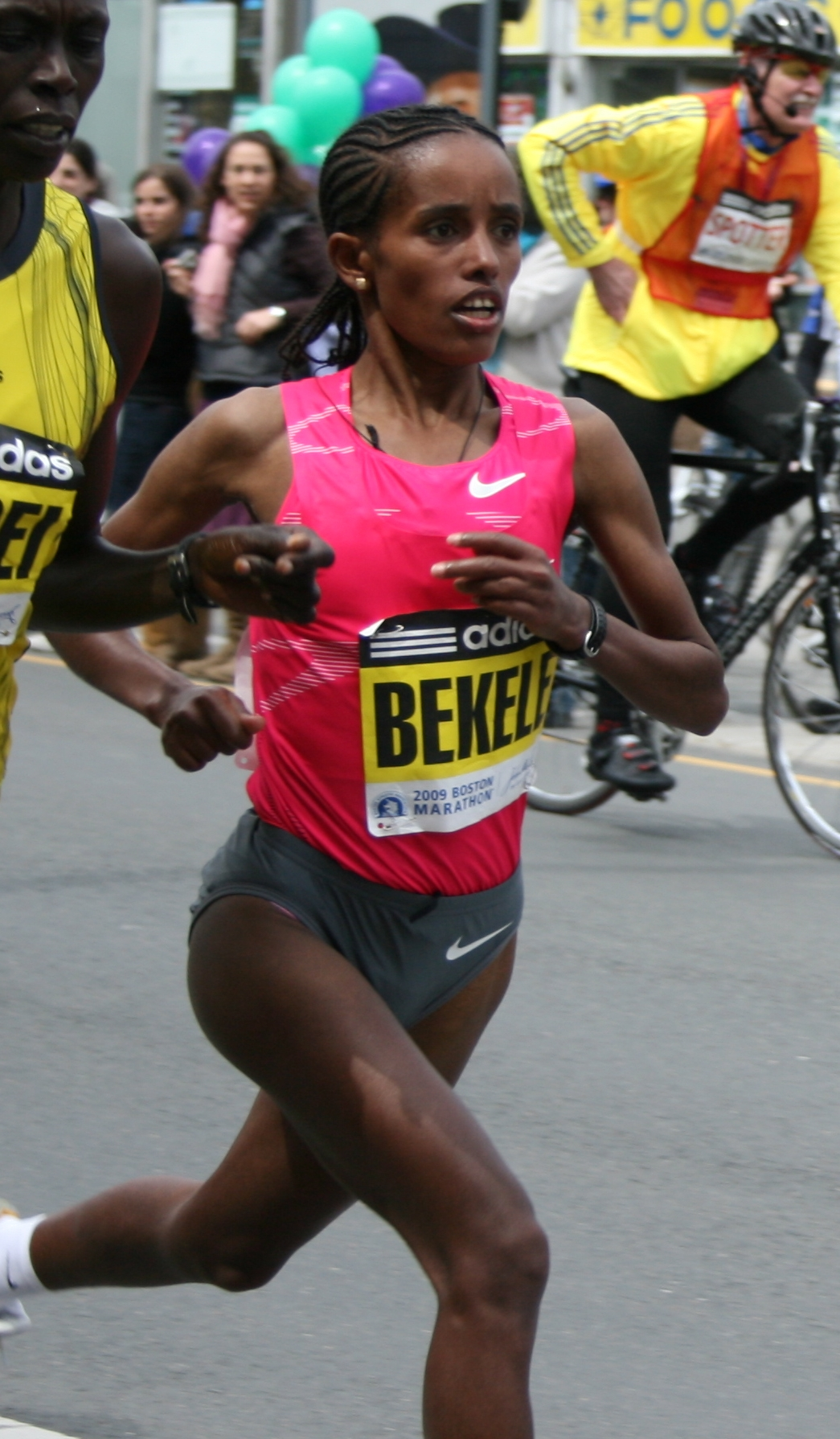
- Bezunesh Bekele at the 2009 Boston Marathon

Personal information
- Full name: Bezunesh Bekele Sertsu
- Nationality: Ethiopian
- Born: 29 January 1983 (age 43) Addis Ababa, Ethiopia
- Height: 1.45 m (4 ft 9 in)

Sport
- Sport: Running
- Event(s): Cross-country, Half marathon, Marathon

Bezunesh Bekele Sertsu (born 29 January 1983) is an Ethiopian long-distance runner who specializes in cross-country running and marathons.

== Biography ==
Bezunesh Bekele Sertsu was born on January 29, 1983, in Addis Ababa, the capital of Ethiopia. In her early career, she achieved notable success in road races, securing back-to-back victories at the Montferland Run in 2004 and 2005, as well as winning the Rotterdam Half Marathon. Her triumph at the Cross Internacional de Itálica in 2006 highlighted her talent, and she later placed sixth in the short race at the 2006 IAAF World Cross Country Championships. In 2007, she added significant circuit victories, including wins at the Zevenheuvelenloop and the Portugal Half Marathon.

At the 2007 IAAF World Road Running Championships, Bezunesh finished fourth, setting a national half marathon record of 1:08:07. However, this record was later surpassed by Dire Tune, who clocked 1:07:18 at the 2009 Ras Al Khaimah Half Marathon. Bezunesh narrowly missed being selected for the 2008 Ethiopian Olympic team, despite having faster times than Tune, which caused tension between the two runners. In 2008, she placed third at the Great Manchester Run, finishing behind Jo Pavey and Rose Cheruiyot.

Bezunesh debuted in the marathon with a time of 2:23:09 at the 2008 Dubai Marathon, securing second place behind Birhane Adere. Her time ranked among the fastest ever for a debut marathon. She returned to Dubai in 2009 and won the marathon, beating Atsede Habtamu by over a minute. That year, she represented Ethiopia in the marathon at the 2009 World Championships in Athletics, finishing in 16th place. In 2010, she came fourth at the London Marathon with a time of 2:23:17, and later secured second place at the Berlin Marathon with a time of 2:24:58.

In the 2011 London Marathon, Bezunesh achieved the best result by an Ethiopian runner, finishing fourth in 2:23:42. She again finished fourth at the 2011 World Championships in Athletics, narrowly missing a medal. In 2012, Bezunesh improved her personal best with a time of 2:20:30 at the Dubai Marathon, ranking as the third fastest Ethiopian woman and one of the top twenty fastest women for the event.

Later in 2012, she placed fourth at the Yangzhou Half Marathon but improved during the year, winning the Great Scottish Run and setting a personal best of 51:45 in the 10-mile race at the Dam tot Damloop, where she finished second. She capped off the year with a fourth-place finish at the Frankfurt Marathon.

Bezunesh is married to fellow Ethiopian marathon runner Tessema Abshiro, who is also a member of the Ethiopian national team.

== Achievements ==
Year	Competition	Venue	Position	Notes
1999	World Cross Country Championships	Belfast, United Kingdom	35th	Junior race
2000	World Cross Country Championships	Vilamoura, Portugal	13th	Junior race
2002	World Cross Country Championships	Dublin, Ireland	6th	Junior race
2003	World Cross Country Championships	Lausanne, Switzerland	28th	Short race
2004	World Cross Country Championships	Brussels, Belgium	18th	Short race
2004	World Half Marathon Championships	New Delhi, India	8th	Half marathon
2005	World Cross Country Championships	Saint-Étienne, France	12th	Short race
2005	World Cross Country Championships	Saint-Étienne, France	10th	Long race
2006	World Cross Country Championships	Fukuoka, Japan	9th	Short race
2006	African Championships	Bambous, Mauritius	5th	10,000 m
2007	World Road Running Championships	Udine, Italy	4th	Half marathon
2009	World Championships	Berlin, Germany	16th	Marathon
2010	London Marathon	London, United Kingdom	4th	Marathon
2010	Berlin Marathon	Berlin, Germany	2nd	Marathon
2011	London Marathon	London, United Kingdom	4th	Marathon
2011	World Championships	Daegu, South Korea	4th	Marathon

=== Personal bests ===
Event	Time	Venue	Date
3000 metres	8:52.08	Gateshead, United Kingdom	11 June 2006
5000 metres	15:02.48	Hengelo, Netherlands	28 May 2006
10,000 metres	31:10.68	Utrecht, Netherlands	17 June 2005
10 kilometres	31:20	Udine, Italy	14 October 2007
15 kilometres	47:36	Nijmegen, Netherlands	18 November 2007
20 kilometres	1:04:40	Udine, Italy	14 October 2007
Half marathon	1:08:07	Udine, Italy	14 October 2007
Marathon	2:20:30	Dubai, United Arab Emirates	27 January 2011

Sporting positions
Preceded by (Kenya) Lydia Cheromei	Rotterdam Women's Half Marathon Winner; 2005	Succeeded by (United Kingdom) Mara Yamauchi
