= Gamal Belal Salem =

Qatari long-distance runner (born 1978)

Gamal Belal Salem (born Kipkemoi Katui on 12 September 1978 in Eldoret, Kenya) is a Qatari runner who specializes in the 3000 metres steeplechase, training with the world record holder Saif Saaeed Shaheen under the Italian coach Renato Canova.

He has represented Qatar at the IAAF World Cross Country Championships on numerous occasions, including two team bronze medals at the 2005 competition and one at the 2008 competition. He won the 10,000 metres at the 2005 West Asian Games, and was also the 5000 metres silver medallist. He was also the silver medallist in the steeplechase at the 2006 Asian Games, where he finished behind fellow Kenyan-turned-Qatari Tareq Mubarak Taher. He won the World Military Cross Country Championships that same year.

From 2009, he decided to run road races, leaving the activity on track. He made his debut over the marathon distance at La Route Du Louvre in May 2010 and won in a time of 2:12:46 hours. He ran at the Amatrice-Configno road race in Italy in August 2010 and took second place behind former compatriot and steeplechase specialist Ezekiel Kemboi. He entered the marathon race at the 2010 Asian Games, but did not manage finish the race.

Salem improved his marathon best to 2:12:27 hours at the 2011 Madrid Marathon and was fourth overall.

== Achievements ==
Year	Competition	Venue	Position	Notes
2005	World Cross Country Championships	Saint-Etienne, France	12th	Long race
2005	World Cross Country Championships	Saint-Etienne, France	3rd	Team competition
2005	World Cross Country Championships	Saint-Etienne, France	5th	Short race
2005	World Cross Country Championships	Saint-Etienne, France	3rd	Team competition
2006	World Cross Country Championships	Fukuoka, Japan	18th	Long race
2006	World Cross Country Championships	Fukuoka, Japan	6th	Team competition
2006	World Cross Country Championships	Fukuoka, Japan	23rd	Short race
2006	World Cross Country Championships	Fukuoka, Japan	4th	Team competition
2006	World Road Running Championships	Debrecen, Hungary	16th	20 km
2006	World Road Running Championships	Debrecen, Hungary	5th	Team competition
2006	Asian Games	Doha, Qatar	2nd	3000 m s'chase
2007	World Cross Country Championships	Mombasa, Kenya	43rd	Senior race
2008	World Cross Country Championships	Edinburgh, Scotland	34th	Senior race
2009	World Cross Country Championships	Amman, Jordan	28th	Senior race
2010	World Cross Country Championships	Bydgoszcz, Poland	54th	Senior race

=== Personal bests ===
- 3000 metres – 7:30.76 min (2005)
- 3000 metres steeplechase – 8:11.67 min (2005)
- 5000 metres – 13:06.81 min (2006)
- 10,000 metres - 27:51.52 min (2008)
- Marathon - 2:12:27 (2011)
