= Rose Jepchumba =

Kenyan long-distance runner (born 1979)

Rose Jepchumba (born 14 March 1979 in Marakwet) is a Kenyan runner.

At the 2005 World Cross Country Championships she finished ninth in the long race. The Kenyan team, of which Jepchumba was a part, won the silver medal in the team competition.

== Personal bests ==
- 3000 metres - 8:59.87 min (2005)
- 10,000 metres - 31:29.81 min (2005)
- Half marathon - 1:10:15 hrs (2005)
