= Yoshiko Ichikawa =

Japanese long-distance runner

Personal information
- Nationality: Japanese
- Born: 18 April 1976 (age 49)

Sport
- Sport: Long-distance running
- Event: 5000 metres

Yoshiko Ichikawa (市川 良子, Ichikawa Yoshiko; born 18 April 1976) is a Japanese long-distance runner. She competed in the 5000 metres at the 1996 Summer Olympics and the 2000 Summer Olympics.
