= Deriba Alemu =

Ethiopian long-distance runner

Deriba Alemu (born 1983) is an Ethiopian long-distance runner.

== International competitions ==
Year	Competition	Venue	Position	Event	Notes
2005	World Cross Country Championships	Saint-Etienne, France	9th	Short race	
2005	World Cross Country Championships	Saint-Etienne, France	1st	Team competition	
2005	World Athletics Final	Monte Carlo, Monaco	11th	3000 m	
2005	World Athletics Final	Monte Carlo, Monaco	8th	5000 m	

== Personal bests ==
- 3000 metres – 8:42.10 (2005)
- 5000 metres – 15:00.56 (2005)
- 10,000 metres – 31:04.49 (2004)
- Half marathon – 1:10:45 (2003)
