= Onèsphore Nkunzimana =

Qatari-Burundian long-distance runner

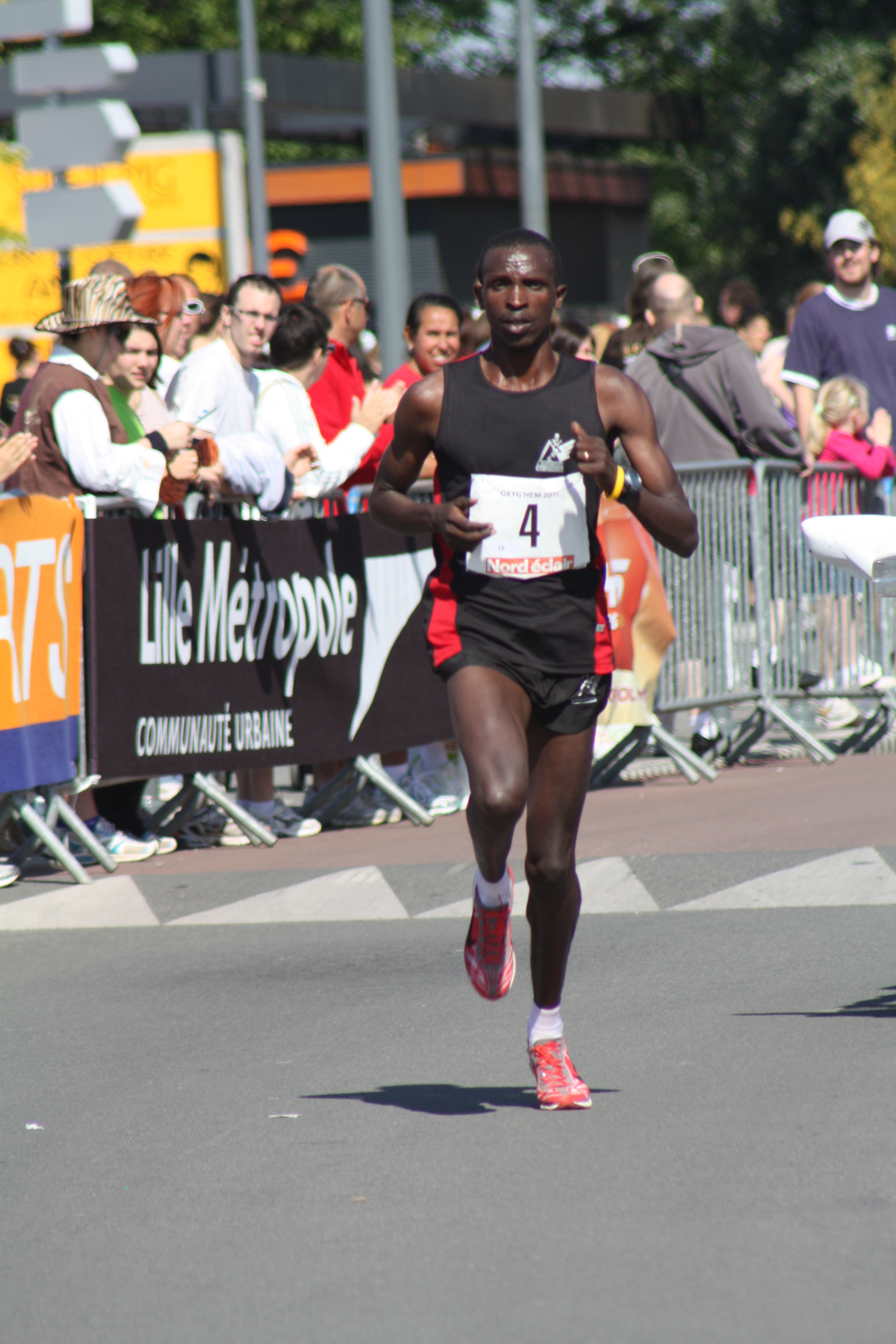

Medal record

Men's athletics

Representing Qatar

Asian Games
Bronze medal – third place	2006 Doha	5000 m

Asian Indoor Championships
Gold medal – first place	2008 Doha	3000 m

Onèsphore Nkunzimana (born July 23, 1985 in Burundi) is a male long-distance runner

His first major competition was the 2000 World Junior Championships in Athletics, where he finished ninth in the 5000 metres

He switched from Burundi to represent Qatar and adopted a new name Sultan Khamis Zaman while competing for them. He ran under his new name and country at the 2004 Summer Olympics. He finished eighth in the short race at the 2004 IAAF World Cross Country Championships and won a team silver medal with Qatar.

He ran at the 2005 World Championships and the 2005 IAAF World Half Marathon Championships, finishing in 16th and 19th place, respectively. He won the Eurocross meeting in 2005 and 2007. He won the bronze medal in the 5000 m at the 2006 Asian Games.

He took the 3000 metres gold medal at the 2008 Asian Indoor Athletics Championships. He won his second world cross country team medal shortly after with a 22nd-place finish at the 2008 World Championships. He represented Qatar at a major competition for a final time at the 2008 Beijing Olympics, but he did not progress beyond the heats.

He changed his allegiance again in 2010, returning to Burundi, and changed back to compete under his birth name, Onèsphore Nkunzimana. He won the Eurocross for a third time in February 2010.
