= 2004 IAAF World Cross Country Championships – Junior men's race =

Junior men's race at the 2004 IAAF World Cross Country Championships
- Organisers: IAAF
- Edition: 32nd
- Date: March 21
- Host city: Brussels, Belgium
- Venue: Ossegem Park
- Events: 1
- Distances: 8 km – Junior men
- Participation: 120 athletes from 40 nations

The Junior men's race at the 2004 IAAF World Cross Country Championships was held at the Ossegem Park in Brussels, Belgium, on March 21, 2004. Reports of the event were given in The New York Times, and for the IAAF.

Complete results for individuals, for teams, medallists, and the results of British athletes who took part were published.

== Race results ==
=== Junior men's race (8 km) ===
==== Individual ====
Rank	Athlete	Country	Time
1st place, gold medalist(s)	Meba Tadesse	Ethiopia	24:01
2nd place, silver medalist(s)	Boniface Kiprop	Uganda	24:03
3rd place, bronze medalist(s)	Ernest Meli Kimeli	Kenya	24:16
4	Barnabas Kosgei	Kenya	24:24
5	Mulugeta Wendimu	Ethiopia	24:44
6	Hosea Macharinyang	Kenya	24:51
7	Ronald Rutto	Kenya	25:04
8	Moses Aliwa	Uganda	25:08
9	Tessema Absher	Ethiopia	25:12
10	Yirefu Birhanu	Ethiopia	25:18
11	Harbert Okuti	Uganda	25:21
12	Nicholas Kwemoi	Uganda	25:22
13	Said El Medouly	Morocco	25:22
14	Mohamed Moustaoui	Morocco	25:25
15	Mohamed Kallouche	Morocco	25:29
16	Moses Masai	Kenya	25:31
17	Hidekazu Sato	Japan	25:36
18	Yegeniy Rybakov	Russia	25:36
19	Yassine Mandour	Morocco	25:43
20	Kabtamu Reta	Ethiopia	25:45
21	Stanley Kipkosgei Salil	Kenya	25:50
22	Henok Lechebo	Canada	26:00
23	Moulay Abdelhak Sabhi	Morocco	26:01
24	Satoru Kitamura	Japan	26:03
25	Nkosinoxolo Sonqibido	South Africa	26:04
26	Aïssa Dahmar	Algeria	26:07
27	Yonas Mebrahtu	Eritrea	26:14
28	Yuki Matsuoka	Japan	26:17
29	Mandla Maseko	South Africa	26:19
30	Marcin Chabowski	Poland	26:19
31	Driss Bouaoui	Morocco	26:21
32	Ahmed Bakry	Egypt	26:24
33	Mohamed El Gayar	Egypt	26:26
34	Ryan Deak	United States	26:27
35	Abdelhalim Boukandoul	Algeria	26:27
36	Yuichiro Ueno	Japan	26:28
37	Forrest Tahdooahnippah	United States	26:29
38	Anatoliy Rybakov	Russia	26:30
39	Amer Ayyad Helil	Egypt	26:37
40	Hideaki Date	Japan	26:38
41	Mike Tebulo	Malawi	26:39
42	Mario van Wayenberghe	Belgium	26:40
43	Mark Christie	Ireland	26:42
44	Łukasz Parszczyński	Poland	26:44
45	Djelloul Aggoun	Algeria	26:45
46	Yuki Sato	Japan	26:47
47	Illya Sukharyev	Ukraine	26:47
48	Andrew Ledwith	Ireland	26:50
49	Joshua McDougal	United States	26:50
50	Keith Gerrard	United Kingdom	26:52
51	Samir Khadar	Algeria	26:56
52	Stefan Patru	Romania	26:58
53	Alejandro Fernández	Spain	26:59
54	Mogos Ahferom	Eritrea	27:01
55	John Janson	United States	27:03
56	Hamza Djeghima	Algeria	27:04
57	Gilialdo Koball	Brazil	27:06
58	Tadesse Abrham	Eritrea	27:07
59	Dmitriy Matiushkin	Russia	27:07
60	Trent Hoerr	United States	27:08
61	Mahiedine Mekhissi-Benabbad	France	27:08
62	Yohan Durand	France	27:09
63	Gary Davenport	United Kingdom	27:11
64	Aleksey Tolstenkov	Russia	27:11
65	Andrew Vernon	United Kingdom	27:12
66	Nuno Costa	Portugal	27:14
67	Michael Brandenbourg	Belgium	27:21
68	Javier García	Spain	27:22
69	Sergiy Trokhymenko	Ukraine	27:25
70	Yauheni Muchynski	Belarus	27:27
71	Barae Hhera	Tanzania	27:28
72	Bernard Dematteis	Italy	27:30
73	Samuel Pawluk	Canada	27:32
74	Simon Tesfai	Eritrea	27:32
75	Ruslan Nasyrov	Uzbekistan	27:35
76	Luis Alberto Marco	Spain	27:37
77	Abderrahmen Kherfouce	Algeria	27:38
78	Chris Lamb	United Kingdom	27:39
79	Gert van Poucke	Belgium	27:40
80	Nkululeko Zamisa	South Africa	27:42
81	Ian Burrell	United States	27:42
82	David Wishart	Canada	27:43
83	Ahmed Abod	Egypt	27:45
84	Ajmal Amirov	Tajikistan	27:48
85	Michel Butter	Netherlands	27:51
86	Franky Hernould	Belgium	27:53
87	Chris Winter	Canada	27:53
88	Shaaun Krawitz	New Zealand	27:54
89	Mike Woods	Canada	27:56
90	Cene Subic	Slovenia	27:59
91	Sebastien Dewitte	Belgium	28:00
92	Antoine de Wilde	France	28:03
93	Kemal Koyunku	Turkey	28:05
94	Dovran Amandjayev	Turkmenistan	28:08
95	Tomás Tajadura	Spain	28:13
96	Alois Moutardier	France	28:16
97	Aaron Robson	Canada	28:22
98	Piet Mokoena	South Africa	28:22
99	Oleksandr Perepecha	Ukraine	28:23
100	José Alberto Martin	Spain	28:29
101	Denides Vélez	Puerto Rico	28:33
102	Denis Kochetkov	Russia	28:44
103	José Antonio Uribe	Mexico	28:44
104	Balázs Ott	Hungary	28:49
105	Alfred Moyakhe	South Africa	28:50
106	Alexander de Jesús	Puerto Rico	28:51
107	Anthony Moran	United Kingdom	28:55
108	Jean-Pierre Weerts	Belgium	29:00
109	Godfrey Ramokone	South Africa	29:06
110	Juan C. Morales	Puerto Rico	29:08
111	Jonathan Thewlis	United Kingdom	29:13
112	Vladyslav Taran	Ukraine	29:19
113	Juan Bote	Spain	29:28
114	Alain McLaren	Switzerland	29:54
115	Blaz Zelic	Croatia	30:17
116	Omar Abusaid	Palestine	30:18
117	Ricardo Estremera	Puerto Rico	31:14
118	Radheshyam Kawang	Nepal	31:24
—	Stefano La Rosa	Italy	DNF
—	Abdellatif Kamal	France	DNF
—	Dema Weyessa	Ethiopia	DNS
—	Sory Fofana	Guinea	DNS
—	Ivan Muhwezi	Uganda	DNS

==== Teams ====
Rank	Team	Points
1st place, gold medalist(s)	Kenya: Ernest Meli Kimeli / 3; Barnabas Kosgei / 4; Hosea Macharinyang / 6; Ronald Rutto / 7; (Moses Masai) / (16); (Stanley Kipkosgei Salil) / (21)	20
2nd place, silver medalist(s)	Ethiopia: Meba Tadesse / 1; Mulugeta Wendimu / 5; Tessema Absher / 9; Yirefu Birhanu / 10; (Kabtamu Reta) / (20)	25
3rd place, bronze medalist(s)	Uganda: Boniface Kiprop / 2; Moses Aliwa / 8; Harbert Okuti / 11; Nicholas Kwemoi / 12	33
4	Morocco: Said El Medouly / 13; Mohamed Moustaoui / 14; Mohamed Kallouche / 15; Yassine Mandour / 19; (Moulay Abdelhak Sabhi) / (23); (Driss Bouaoui) / (31)	61
5	Japan: Hidekazu Sato / 17; Satoru Kitamura / 24; Yuki Matsuoka / 28; Yuichiro Ueno / 36; (Hideaki Date) / (40); (Yuki Sato) / (46)	105
6	Algeria: Aïssa Dahmar / 26; Abdelhalim Boukandoul / 35; Djelloul Aggoun / 45; Samir Khadar / 51; (Hamza Djeghima) / (56); (Abderrahmen Kherfouce) / (77)	157
7	United States: Ryan Deak / 34; Forrest Tahdooahnippah / 37; Joshua McDougal / 49; John Janson / 55; (Trent Hoerr) / (60); (Ian Burrell) / (81)	175
8	Russia: Yegeniy Rybakov / 18; Anatoliy Rybakov / 38; Dmitriy Matiushkin / 59; Aleksey Tolstenkov / 64; (Denis Kochetkov) / (102)	179
9	Egypt: Ahmed Bakry / 32; Mohamed El Gayar / 33; Amer Ayyad Helil / 39; Ahmed Abod / 83	187
10	Eritrea: Yonas Mebrahtu / 27; Mogos Ahferom / 54; Tadesse Abrham / 58; Simon Tesfai / 74	213
11	South Africa: Nkosinoxolo Sonqibido / 25; Mandla Maseko / 29; Nkululeko Zamisa / 80; Piet Mokoena / 98; (Alfred Moyakhe) / (105); (Godfrey Ramokone) / (109)	232
12	United Kingdom: Keith Gerrard / 50; Gary Davenport / 63; Andrew Vernon / 65; Chris Lamb / 78; (Anthony Moran) / (107); (Jonathan Thewlis) / (111)	256
13	Canada: Henok Lechebo / 22; Samuel Pawluk / 73; David Wishart / 82; Chris Winter / 87; (Mike Woods) / (89); (Aaron Robson) / (97)	264
14	Belgium: Mario van Wayenberghe / 42; Michael Brandenbourg / 67; Gert van Poucke / 79; Franky Hernould / 86; (Sebastien Dewitte) / (91); (Jean-Pierre Weerts) / (108)	274
15	Spain: Alejandro Fernández / 53; Javier García / 68; Luis Alberto Marco / 76; Tomás Tajadura / 95; (José Alberto Martin) / (100); (Juan Bote) / (113)	292
16	France: Mahiedine Mekhissi-Benabbad / 61; Yohan Durand / 62; Antoine de Wilde / 92; Alois Moutardier / 96; (Abdellatif Kamal) / (DNF)	311
17	Ukraine: Illya Sukharyev / 47; Sergiy Trokhymenko / 69; Oleksandr Perepecha / 99; Vladyslav Taran / 112	327
18	Puerto Rico: Denides Vélez / 101; Alexander de Jesús / 106; Juan C. Morales / 110; Ricardo Estremera / 117	434

- Note: Athletes in parentheses did not score for the team result

== Participation ==
According to an unofficial count, 120 athletes from 40 countries participated in the Junior men's race. This is in agreement with the official numbers as published. The announced athlete from Guinea did not show.

- Algeria (6)
- Belarus (1)
- Belgium (6)
- Brazil (1)
- Canada (6)
- Croatia (1)
- Egypt (4)
- Eritrea (4)
- Ethiopia (5)
- France (5)
- Hungary (1)
- Ireland (2)
- Italy (2)
- Japan (6)
- Kenya (6)
- Malawi (1)
- Mexico (1)
- Morocco (6)
- Nepal (1)
- Netherlands (1)
- New Zealand (1)
- Palestine (1)
- Poland (2)
- Portugal (1)
- Puerto Rico (4)
- Romania (1)
- Russia (5)
- Slovenia (1)
- South Africa (6)
- Spain (6)
- Switzerland (1)
- Tajikistan (1)
- Tanzania (1)
- Turkey (1)
- Turkmenistan (1)
- Uganda (4)
- Ukraine (4)
- United Kingdom (6)
- United States (6)
- Uzbekistan (1)

== See also ==
- 2004 IAAF World Cross Country Championships – Senior men's race
- 2004 IAAF World Cross Country Championships – Men's short race
- 2004 IAAF World Cross Country Championships – Senior women's race
- 2004 IAAF World Cross Country Championships – Women's short race
- 2004 IAAF World Cross Country Championships – Junior women's race
