= List of Ethiopian Athletics Championships winners =

The Ethiopian Athletics Championships is an annual track and field competition which serves as the national championship for Ethiopia. It is organised by the Ethiopian Athletics Federation, Ethiopia's national governing body for the sport of athletics. The winner of each event at the championships is declared the national champion for that year.

== Men ==
=== 100 metres ===
- 1992: Tesfaye Jenbere
- 1993: Tesfaye Jenbere
- 1994: Tesfaye Jenbere
- 1995: Tesfaye Jenbere
- 1996: Negussie Getchamo
- 1997: Negussie Getchamo
- 1998: Negussie Getchamo
- 1999: ?
- 2000: Negussie Getchamo
- 2001: Negussie Getchamo
- 2002: ?
- 2003: Tadele Alemu
- 2004: Wetere Gelelcha
- 2005: Wetere Gelelcha

=== 200 metres ===
- 1992: Getahun Workesa
- 1993: Getachew Legesse
- 1994: Tesfaye Jenbere
- 1995: Getachew Legesse
- 1996: Negussie Getchamo
- 1997: Negussie Getchamo
- 1998: Negussie Getchamo
- 1999: ?
- 2000: Negussie Getchamo
- 2001: Shiferaw Shibiru
- 2002: ?
- 2003: Negussie Getchamo
- 2004: Alemayehu Adebo
- 2005: Wetere Gelelcha
- 2006: Wetere Gelelcha

=== 400 metres ===
- 1992: Bekele Ergego
- 1993: Bekele Ergego
- 1994: Bedasa Tafa
- 1995: Bedasa Tafa
- 1996: Bedasa Tafa
- 1997: Alemayehu Adis
- 1998: Alemayehu Adebo
- 1999: ?
- 2000: Alemayehu Adebo
- 2001: ?
- 2002: ?
- 2003: Alemayehu Adebo
- 2004: Alemayehu Adebo
- 2005: Habtamu Abeje
- 2006: Habtamu Abeje

=== 800 metres ===
- 1992: Bekele Banbere
- 1993: Bekele Banbere
- 1994: Bekele Banbere
- 1995: Bekele Banbere
- 1996: Bekele Ergego
- 1997: Mechal Gebreab
- 1998: Mechal Gebreab
- 1999: ?
- 2000: Berhanu Alemu
- 2001: Daniel Zegeye
- 2002: ?
- 2003: Berhanu Alemu
- 2004: Samuel Dadi
- 2005: Abiyot Abebe
- 2006: Kumsa Adugna

=== 1500 metres ===
- 1992: Tamrat Dadi
- 1993: Hailu Zewode
- 1994: Hailu Zewode
- 1995: Abreham Tsige
- 1996: Mizan Mehari
- 1997: Mengesha Feyisa
- 1998: Haile Gebrselassie
- 1999: ?
- 2000: Hailu Mekonnen
- 2001: Daniel Zegeye
- 2002: ?
- 2003: Berhanu Alemu
- 2004: Seifu Nebse
- 2005: Race declared void
- 2006: Kumsa Adugna

=== 5000 metres ===
- 1992: Fita Bayisa
- 1993: Haile Gebrselassie
- 1994: Habte Jifar
- 1995: Lemi Erpassa
- 1996: Girma Tolla
- 1997: Hailu Mekonnen
- 1998: Hailu Mekonnen
- 1999: ?
- 2000: Dagne Alemu
- 2001: Abiyot Abate
- 2002: ?
- 2003: Sileshi Sihine
- 2004: Kenenisa Bekele
- 2005: Gebregziabher Gebremariam
- 2006: Markos Geneti

=== 10,000 metres ===
- 1992: Addis Abebe
- 1993: Fita Bayisa
- 1994: Chala Kelele
- 1995: Habte Jifar
- 1996: Girma Tolla
- 1997: Assefa Mezgebu
- 1998: Assefa Mezgebu
- 1999: ?
- 2000: Assefa Mezgebu
- 2001: Assefa Mezgebu
- 2002: ?
- 2003: Sileshi Sihine
- 2004: Sileshi Sihine
- 2005: Gebregziabher Gebremariam
- 2006: Ibrahim Jeilan

=== Half marathon ===
- 1993: Gebremichael Kidane
- 1994: ?
- 1995: ?
- 1996: ?
- 1997: ?
- 1998: Alene Emere
- 1999: ?
- 2000: ?
- 2001: ?
- 2002: ?
- 2003: Dereje Adere
- 2004: ?
- 2005: Solomon Tsige

=== 3000 metres steeplechase ===
- 1992: Bizuneh Yai Tura
- 1993: Simretu Alemayehu
- 1994: Ayele Mezgebu
- 1995: Lemma Alemayehu
- 1996: Geremew Haile
- 1997: Simretu Alemayehu
- 1998: Simretu Alemayehu
- 1999: ?
- 2000: Lemma Alemayehu
- 2001: Maru Daba
- 2002: ?
- 2003: Bulti Bekele
- 2004: Tewodros Shiferaw
- 2005: Roba Gari
- 2006: Eskyas Sisay

=== 110 metres hurdles ===
- 1992: Tesfaye Aschalew
- 1993: Abusha Demisse
- 1994: Tesfaye Aschalew
- 1995: Zelalem Aklilu
- 1996: Zelalem Aklilu
- 1997: Zelalem Aklilu
- 1998: Defaru Asfaw
- 1999: ?
- 2000: Zelalem Aklilu
- 2001: ?
- 2002: ?
- 2003: Ubang Abaya
- 2004: Ubang Abaya
- 2005: Ubang Abaya

=== 400 metres hurdles ===
- 1992: Tesfaye Aschalew
- 1993: Tesfaye Aschalew
- 1994: Abusha Demisse
- 1995: Tesfaye Aschalew
- 1996: Defaru Asfaw
- 1997: Mesfin Tefera
- 1998: Defaru Asfaw
- 1999: ?
- 2000: Mesfin Tefera
- 2001: ?
- 2002: ?
- 2003: Ubang Abaya
- 2004: Ubang Abaya
- 2005: Ubang Abaya

=== High jump ===
- 1992: Zeleke Aredo
- 1993: Getu Keberie
- 1994: Rahmeto Shahibo
- 1995: Rahmeto Shahibo
- 1996: Teshome Kemiso
- 1997: Teshome Kemiso
- 1998: Teshome Kemiso
- 1999: ?
- 2000: Teshome Kemiso
- 2001: ?
- 2002: ?
- 2003: Jemal Ahmed
- 2004: Ujulo Ubang
- 2005: Ujulo Ubang

=== Pole vault ===
- 1994: Feyesa Atewa
- 1995: Feyisa Otadi
- 1996: Berhanu Semanu
- 1997: Feyisa Etao
- 1998: Tadesse Yirga
- 1999: ?
- 2000: Yared Assefa
- 2001: ?
- 2002: ?
- 2003: Not held
- 2004: Seatu Tilahun Berhe
- 2005: Seatu Tilahun Berhe
- 2006: Abula Ubang

=== Long jump ===
- 1992: Gashawbeza Lemma
- 1993: Gashawbeza Lemma
- 1994: Gashawbeza Lemma
- 1995: Gashawbeza Lemma
- 1996: Zelalem Aklilu
- 1997: Zelalem Aklilu
- 1998: Negussie Getchamo
- 1999: ?
- 2000: Negussie Getchamo
- 2001: Negussie Getchamo
- 2002: ?
- 2003: Gezenew Meteku
- 2004: Negussie Getchamo
- 2005: Girmay Gebretsadik

=== Triple jump ===
- 1992: Gashawbeza Lemma
- 1993: Gashawbeza Lemma
- 1994: Gashawbeza Lemma
- 1995: Gashawbeza Lemma
- 1996: Jasahun Tassema
- 1997: Berhanu Fekede
- 1998: Berhanu Fekede
- 1999: ?
- 2000: Berhanu Fekede
- 2001: ?
- 2002: ?
- 2003: Gezenew Meteku
- 2004: ?
- 2005: Berhanu Fekede
- 2006: Galwak Garkot

=== Shot put ===
- 1992: Tsegaye Woldesenbet
- 1993: Geresu Zaddo
- 1994: Tsegaye Woldesenbet
- 1995: Tsegaye Woldesenbet
- 1996: Tsegaye Woldesenbet
- 1997: Tsegaye Woldesenbet
- 1998: Tsegaye Woldesenbet
- 1999: ?
- 2000: Tsegaye Woldesenbet
- 2001: Tsegaye Woldesenbet
- 2002: ?
- 2003: Tsegaye Woldesenbet
- 2004: Sisay Mekonnen
- 2005: Tsegaye Woldesenbet
- 2006: Sisay Mekonnen

=== Discus throw ===
- 1992: Desta Wajkira
- 1993: Demisse Balcha
- 1994: Desta Wajkira
- 1995: Desta Wajkira
- 1996: Desta Wajkira
- 1997: Desta Wajkira
- 1998: Desta Wajkira
- 1999: ?
- 2000: Tsegaye Woldesenbet
- 2001: ?
- 2002: ?
- 2003: Tsegaye Woldesenbet
- 2004: Tsegaye Woldesenbet
- 2005: Tsegaye Woldesenbet
- 2006: Mohamed Sale

=== Hammer throw ===
- 1993: Desta Wajkira
- 1994: Desta Wajkira
- 1995: Desta Wajkira
- 1996: Desta Wajkira
- 1997: Desta Wajkira
- 1998: Diko Kebede
- 1999: ?
- 2000: Diko Kebede
- 2001: ?
- 2002: ?
- 2003: Sisay Mekonnen
- 2004: Sisay Mekonnen
- 2005: Sisay Mekonnen
- 2006: Sisay Mekonnen

=== Javelin throw ===
- 1992: Bekele Tola
- 1993: Bekele Tola
- 1994: Bekele Tola
- 1995: Geremew Jibat
- 1996: Diro Tola
- 1997: Diro Tola
- 1998: Diro Tola
- 1999: ?
- 2000: Diro Tola
- 2001: ?
- 2002: ?
- 2003: Abdissa Tadesse
- 2004: Diro Tola
- 2005: Abdissa Tadesse

=== 10,000 metres track walk ===
- 1993: Getachew Demisse
- 1994: Getachew Demisse
- 1995: Getachew Demisse

=== 20 kilometres walk ===
- 1996: Getachew Demisse
- 1997: Getachew Demisse
- 1998: Getachew Demisse
- 1999: ?
- 2000: ?
- 2001: ?
- 2002: ?
- 2003: Ashenafi Mercha
- 2004: Ashenafi Mercha
- 2005: Ashenafi Mercha
- 2006: Cherenet Makore

== Women ==
=== 100 metres ===
- 1992: Abaynesh Arega
- 1993: Alemitu Dissasa
- 1994: Alemitu Dissasa
- 1995: Rahel Kebere
- 1996: Genet Badi
- 1997: Netsanet Getu
- 1998: Netsanet Getu
- 1999: Netsanet Getu
- 2000: Kassu Chiquala
- 2001: ?
- 2002: ?
- 2003: Leaynet Alemu
- 2004: Ayneaddis Tessema
- 2005: Atekelt Wubshet

=== 200 metres ===
- 1992: Abaynesh Arega
- 1993: Abaynesh Arega
- 1994: Genet Badi
- 1995: Woynshet Eka
- 1996: Genet Badi
- 1997: Netsanet Getu
- 1998: Netsanet Getu
- 1999: Netsanet Getu
- 2000: Netsanet Getu
- 2001: ?
- 2002: ?
- 2003: Leaynet Alemu
- 2004: Netsanet Getu
- 2005: Atekelt Wubshet
- 2006: Atekelt Wubshet

=== 400 metres ===
- 1992: Senait Haile
- 1993: Abaynesh Arega
- 1994: Abaynesh Arega
- 1995: Abaynesh Arega
- 1996: Abaynesh Arega
- 1997: Woynshet Eka
- 1998: Fekerte Dagne
- 1999: Senait Kedir
- 2000: Netsanet Getu
- 2001: ?
- 2002: ?
- 2003: Netsanet Getu
- 2004: Netsanet Getu
- 2005: Lemdsa Kumsa
- 2006: Abebe Megersa

=== 800 metres ===
- 1992: Zewde Hailemariam
- 1993: Zewde Hailemariam
- 1994: Kutre Dulecha
- 1995: Shura Hutesa
- 1996: Sentayehu Fikre
- 1997: Kutre Dulecha
- 1998: Kutre Dulecha
- 1999: Kutre Dulecha
- 2000: Kutre Dulecha
- 2001: Genet Gebregiorgis
- 2002: ?
- 2003: Meskerem Legesse
- 2004: Meskerem Legesse
- 2005: Mestawat Tadesse
- 2006: Mestawat Tadesse

=== 1500 metres ===
- 1992: Ejigayehu Worku
- 1993: Getenesh Urge
- 1994: Kutre Dulecha
- 1995: Sentayehu Fikre
- 1996: Sentayehu Fikre
- 1997: Kutre Dulecha
- 1998: Kutre Dulecha
- 1999: Kutre Dulecha
- 2000: Kutre Dulecha
- 2001: Genet Gebregiorgis
- 2002: ?
- 2003: Meskerem Legesse
- 2004: Gelete Burka
- 2005: Gelete Burka
- 2006: Birhane Hirpassa

=== 3000 metres ===
- 1992: Emebet Shiferaw
- 1993: Berhane Adere
- 1994: Derartu Tulu
- 1995: Not held
- 1996: Not held
- 1997: Not held
- 1998: Not held
- 1999: Not held
- 2000: Not held
- 2001: Not held
- 2002: ?
- 2003: Meseret Defar
- 2004: Meseret Defar
- 2005: Belaynesh Zemedkun
- 2006: Koren Jelela

=== 5000 metres ===
- 1995: Ayelech Worku
- 1996: Luchia Yishak
- 1997: Merima Denboba
- 1998: Getenesh Urge
- 1999: Ayelech Worku
- 2000: Gete Wami
- 2001: Ayelech Worku
- 2002: ?
- 2003: Tirunesh Dibaba
- 2004: Meselech Melkamu
- 2005: Gelete Burka
- 2006: Meseret Defar
- 2007: ?
- 2008: ?
- 2009: Genzebe Dibaba
- 2010: Sule Utura
- 2011: Sule Utura
- 2012: Buze Diriba
- 2013: Senbere Teferi
- 2014: Almaz Ayana
- 2015: Haftamnesh Tesfay
- 2016: Dera Dida
- 2017: Senbere Teferi
- 2018: Hawi Feysa
- 2019: Fantu Worku
- 2020: ?
- 2021: Gudaf Tsegay
- 2022: Fantaye Belayneh

=== 10,000 metres ===
- 1992: Derartu Tulu
- 1993: Berhane Adere
- 1994: Merima Denboba
- 1995: Merima Denboba
- 1996: Fatuma Roba
- 1997: Merima Denboba
- 1998: Merima Denboba
- 1999: Gete Wami
- 2000: Merima Denboba
- 2001: Merima Denboba
- 2002: ?
- 2003: Werknesh Kidane
- 2004: Derartu Tulu
- 2005: Werknesh Kidane
- 2006: Bezunesh Bekele

=== Half marathon ===
- 1998: Asha Gigi
- 1999: ?
- 2000: ?
- 2001: ?
- 2002: ?
- 2003: Teyba Erkesso
- 2004: ?
- 2005: Merima Hashim

=== 3000 metres steeplechase ===
- 2006: Mekdes Bekele

=== 100 metres hurdles ===
- 1993: Wali Engida
- 1994: Wali Engida
- 1995: Wali Engida
- 1996: Wali Engida
- 1997: Wali Engida
- 1998: Senait Kedir
- 1999: ?
- 2000: Astegedech Bekele
- 2001: ?
- 2002: ?
- 2003: Netsanet Bekele
- 2004: Netsanet Bekele
- 2005: Netsanet Bekele
- 2006: Terhas Haileselassie

=== 400 metres hurdles ===
- 1993: Ethiopia Terefe
- 1994: Aster Geleta
- 1995: Aster Geleta
- 1996: Fekerte Dagne
- 1997: Fekerte Dagne
- 1998: Fekerte Dagne
- 1999: Genet Weldeselassie
- 2000: Almaz Finfe
- 2001: ?
- 2002: ?
- 2003: Fekerte Dagne
- 2004: Tadelech Eruero
- 2005: Mendaye Lemma

=== High jump ===
- 1992: Hiwot Sisay
- 1993: Hiwot Sisay
- 1994: Hiwot Sisay
- 1995: Hiwot Sisay
- 1996: Aynalem Tilahun
- 1997: Hiwot Sisay
- 1998: Senait Kedir
- 1999: ?
- 2000: Aynalem Tilahun
- 2001: ?
- 2002: ?
- 2003: Haymanot Bekele
- 2004: Haregewoin Mengitsu
- 2005: Mekdes Bekele
- 2006: Haymanot Bekele

=== Long jump ===
- 1992: Hiwot Sisay
- 1993: Hiwot Sisay
- 1994: Hiwot Sisay
- 1995: Tadelech Eruero
- 1996: Wali Engida
- 1997: Hiwot Sisay
- 1998: Hiwot Sisay
- 1999: ?
- 2000: Netsanet Getu
- 2001: ?
- 2002: ?
- 2003: Emebet Tilahun
- 2004: Tadelech Eruero
- 2005: Emebet Tilahun
- 2006: Emebet Tilahun

=== Triple jump ===
- 1997: Tadelech Eruero
- 1998: Tadelech Eruero
- 1999: ?
- 2000: Emebet Tilahun
- 2001: ?
- 2002: ?
- 2003: Tadelech Eruero
- 2004: ?
- 2005: Emebet Tilahun
- 2006: Emebet Tilahun

=== Shot put ===
- 1992: Debritu Tilahun
- 1993: Debritu Tilahun
- 1994: Debritu Tilahun
- 1995: Debritu Tilahun
- 1996: Debritu Tilahun
- 1997: Debritu Tilahun
- 1998: Debritu Tilahun
- 1999: ?
- 2000: Roman Abera
- 2001: ?
- 2002: ?
- 2003: Roman Abera
- 2004: Roman Abera
- 2005: Roman Abera
- 2006: Roman Abera

=== Discus throw ===
- 1992: Gete Tekle
- 1993: Welete Hamdie
- 1994: Zinabua Takele
- 1995: Zinabua Takele
- 1996: Debritu Tilahun
- 1997: Zinabua Takele
- 1998: Debritu Tilahun
- 1999: ?
- 2000: Debritu Tilahun
- 2001: ?
- 2002: ?
- 2003: Meseret Gebretsadik
- 2004: Meseret Gebretsadik
- 2005: Mersit Gebregziabher
- 2006: Zewdenesh Beshah

=== Javelin throw ===
- 1992: Aynalem Tekabe
- 1993: Aynalem Tekabe
- 1994: Aberach Geletu
- 1995: Aynalem Tekabe
- 1996: Aynalem Tekabe
- 1997: Aynalem Tekabe
- 1998: Aynalem Tekabe
- 1999: ?
- 2000: Aynalem Tekabe
- 2001: ?
- 2002: ?
- 2003: Aynalem Tekabe
- 2004: Aynalem Tekabe
- 2005: Abaynesh Sisay
- 2006: Abaynesh Sisay

=== 5000 metres walk ===
- 1993: Amsale Yakobe
- 1994: Amsale Yakobe
- 1995: Amsale Yakobe

=== 10 kilometres walk ===
The 1997 and 1998 championships were held as track events.

- 1996: Amsale Yakobe
- 1997: Gete Koma
- 1998: Gete Koma
- 1999: ?
- 2000: ?
- 2001: ?
- 2002: ?
- 2003: Amsale Yakobe
- 2004: ?
- 2005: Hanna Haileselassie
- 2006: Asnakech Ararso
