= 2004 IAAF World Cross Country Championships – Women's short race =

Women's short race at the 2004 IAAF World Cross Country Championships
- Organisers: IAAF
- Edition: 32nd
- Date: March 21
- Host city: Brussels, Belgium
- Venue: Ossegem Park
- Events: 6
- Distances: 4 km – Women's short
- Participation: 91 athletes from 29 nations

The Women's short race at the 2004 IAAF World Cross Country Championships was held at the Ossegem Park in Brussels, Belgium, on March 21, 2004. Reports of the event were given in The New York Times, and for the IAAF.

Complete results for individuals, for teams, medallists, and the results of British athletes who took part were published.

== Race results ==
=== Women's short race (4 km) ===
==== Individual ====
Rank	Athlete	Country	Time
1st place, gold medalist(s)	Edith Masai	Kenya	13:07
2nd place, silver medalist(s)	Tirunesh Dibaba	Ethiopia	13:09
3rd place, bronze medalist(s)	Teyiba Erkesso	Ethiopia	13:11
4	Worknesh Kidane	Ethiopia	13:14
5	Isabella Ochichi	Kenya	13:18
6	Olga Romanova	Russia	13:19
7	Peninah Chepchumba	Kenya	13:22
8	Vivian Cheruiyot	Kenya	13:23
9	Jane Wanjiku	Kenya	13:23
10	Ejagayehu Dibaba	Ethiopia	13:23
11	Amane Godana	Ethiopia	13:27
12	Zahra Ouaziz	Morocco	13:33
13	Émilie Mondor	Canada	13:33
14	Shalane Flanagan	United States	13:34
15	Sarah Jamieson	Australia	13:40
16	Bouchra Chaâbi	Morocco	13:40
17	Carmen Douma-Hussar	Canada	13:41
18	Bezunesh Bekele	Ethiopia	13:42
19	Helen Clitheroe	United Kingdom	13:45
20	Kathy Butler	United Kingdom	13:47
21	Beatrice Chepchumba	Kenya	13:49
22	Malindi Elmore	Canada	13:49
23	Valentina Belotti	Italy	13:51
24	Lauren Fleshman	United States	13:56
25	Kazue Ogoshi	Japan	13:57
26	Anália Rosa	Portugal	13:58
27	Hayley McGregor	Australia	13:58
28	Seloua Ouaziz	Morocco	13:58
29	Justyna Bąk	Poland	14:01
30	Helena Sampaio	Portugal	14:04
31	Ana Dias	Portugal	14:06
32	Elodie Olivares	France	14:07
33	Anna Thompson	Australia	14:07
34	Kate Reed	United Kingdom	14:08
35	Tina Connelly	Canada	14:10
36	Iris Fuentes-Pila	Spain	14:12
37	Courtney Inman	Canada	14:14
38	Dorcus Inzikuru	Uganda	14:16
39	Fatiha Baouf	Belgium	14:17
40	Marina Bastos	Portugal	14:17
41	Simret Sultan	Eritrea	14:18
42	Mirja Jenni-Moser	Switzerland	14:19
43	Christin Wurth	United States	14:21
44	Rachel Penney	New Zealand	14:21
45	Mariem Alaoui Selsouli	Morocco	14:24
46	Fatma Lanouar	Tunisia	14:25
47	Cristina Casandra	Romania	14:25
48	Rocío Martínez	Spain	14:26
49	Sonia Bejarano	Spain	14:26
50	Eliane Murer	Switzerland	14:26
51	Veerle van Linden	Belgium	14:26
52	Freya Murray	United Kingdom	14:27
53	Mary Davies	New Zealand	14:27
54	Saori Makishima	Japan	14:27
55	Yamna Oubouhou	France	14:29
56	Véronique Collard	Belgium	14:29
57	Leah Pells	Canada	14:29
58	Jacqueline Martín	Spain	14:30
59	Yamina Bouchaouante	France	14:31
60	Melissa Buttry	United States	14:33
61	Jéssica Augusto	Portugal	14:33
62	Susana Rebolledo	Chile	14:34
63	Christine Bardelle	France	14:37
64	Sarah Hann	United States	14:38
65	Zulema Fuentes-Pila	Spain	14:39
66	Faye Fullerton	United Kingdom	14:40
67	Christina Carruzzo	Switzerland	14:40
68	Habiba Ghribi	Tunisia	14:43
69	Monique Zimmer	Switzerland	14:45
70	Andrea Etter	Switzerland	14:45
71	Mieke Geens	Belgium	14:47
72	Jessica Wright	New Zealand	14:48
73	Cláudia Pereira	Portugal	14:50
74	Liesbeth van de Velde	Belgium	14:52
75	Natsumi Fujita	Japan	14:53
76	Marzena Michalska	Italy	14:55
77	Janet Trujillo	United States	14:57
78	Julie Coulaud	France	14:59
79	Sigrid van den Bempt	Belgium	15:04
80	Fiona Crombie	New Zealand	15:05
81	Michela Zanatta	Italy	15:11
82	Elsa Monterroso	Guatemala	15:53
83	Ziyodahon Abdullaeva	Uzbekistan	15:58
84	Nigiste Neguse	Eritrea	16:12
85	Zubeda Gussi	Tanzania	16:16
86	Francine Nzilampa	DR Congo	16:25
87	Tania Poma	Bolivia	16:57
88	Tika Kumari Choudhari	Nepal	17:53
89	Yekaterina Ilyazova	Turkmenistan	17:57
—	Rosa Morató	Spain	DNF
—	Ouafa Frekech	Morocco	DNF
—	Georgie Clarke	Australia	DNS
—	Benita Willis	Australia	DNS
—	Maiama Baïlo Souare	Guinea	DNS
—	Patrizia Tisi	Italy	DNS
—	Lornah Kiplagat	Netherlands	DNS
—	Hawa Hussein	Tanzania	DNS

==== Teams ====
Rank	Team	Points
1st place, gold medalist(s)	Ethiopia: Tirunesh Dibaba / 2; Teyiba Erkesso / 3; Worknesh Kidane / 4; Ejagayehu Dibaba / 10; (Amane Godana) / (11); (Bezunesh Bekele) / (18)	19
2nd place, silver medalist(s)	Kenya: Edith Masai / 1; Isabella Ochichi / 5; Peninah Chepchumba / 7; Vivian Cheruiyot / 8; (Jane Wanjiku) / (9); (Beatrice Chepchumba) / (21)	21
3rd place, bronze medalist(s)	Canada: Émilie Mondor / 13; Carmen Douma-Hussar / 17; Malindi Elmore / 22; Tina Connelly / 35; (Courtney Inman) / (37); (Leah Pells) / (57)	87
4	Morocco: Zahra Ouaziz / 12; Bouchra Chaâbi / 16; Seloua Ouaziz / 28; Mariem Alaoui Selsouli / 45; (Ouafa Frekech) / (DNF)	101
5	United Kingdom: Helen Clitheroe / 19; Kathy Butler / 20; Kate Reed / 34; Freya Murray / 52; (Faye Fullerton) / (66)	125
6	Portugal: Anália Rosa / 26; Helena Sampaio / 30; Ana Dias / 31; Marina Bastos / 40; (Jéssica Augusto) / (61); (Cláudia Pereira) / (73)	127
7	United States: Shalane Flanagan / 14; Lauren Fleshman / 24; Christin Wurth / 43; Melissa Buttry / 60; (Sarah Hann) / (64); (Janet Trujillo) / (77)	141
8	Spain: Iris Fuentes-Pila / 36; Rocío Martínez / 48; Sonia Bejarano / 49; Jacqueline Martín / 58; (Zulema Fuentes-Pila) / (65); (Rosa Morató) / (DNF)	191
9	France: Elodie Olivares / 32; Yamna Oubouhou / 55; Yamina Bouchaouante / 59; Christine Bardelle / 63; (Julie Coulaud) / (78)	209
10	Belgium: Fatiha Baouf / 39; Veerle van Linden / 51; Véronique Collard / 56; Mieke Geens / 71; (Liesbeth van de Velde) / (74); (Sigrid van den Bempt) / (79)	217
11	Switzerland: Mirja Jenni-Moser / 42; Eliane Murer / 50; Christina Carruzzo / 67; Monique Zimmer / 69; (Andrea Etter) / (70)	228
12	New Zealand: Rachel Penney / 44; Mary Davies / 53; Jessica Wright / 72; Fiona Crombie / 80	249

- Note: Athletes in parentheses did not score for the team result

== Participation ==
According to an unofficial count, 91 athletes from 29 countries participated in the Women's short race. The announced athletes from Guinea and the Netherlands did not show.

- Australia (3)
- Belgium (6)
- Bolivia (1)
- Canada (6)
- Chile (1)
- DR Congo (1)
- Eritrea (2)
- Ethiopia (6)
- France (5)
- Guatemala (1)
- Italy (3)
- Japan (3)
- Kenya (6)
- Morocco (5)
- Nepal (1)
- New Zealand (4)
- Poland (1)
- Portugal (6)
- Romania (1)
- Russia (1)
- Spain (6)
- Switzerland (5)
- Tanzania (1)
- Tunisia (2)
- Turkmenistan (1)
- Uganda (1)
- United Kingdom (5)
- United States (6)
- Uzbekistan (1)

== See also ==
- 2004 IAAF World Cross Country Championships – Senior men's race
- 2004 IAAF World Cross Country Championships – Men's short race
- 2004 IAAF World Cross Country Championships – Junior men's race
- 2004 IAAF World Cross Country Championships – Senior women's race
- 2004 IAAF World Cross Country Championships – Junior women's race
