= 2004 IAAF World Cross Country Championships – Men's short race =

Men's short race at the 2004 IAAF World Cross Country Championships
- Organisers: IAAF
- Edition: 32nd
- Date: March 20
- Host city: Brussels, Belgium
- Venue: Ossegem Park
- Events: 1
- Distances: 4 km – Men's short
- Participation: 140 athletes from 47 nations

The Men's short race at the 2004 IAAF World Cross Country Championships was held at the Ossegem Park in Brussels, Belgium, on March 20, 2004. Reports of the event were given in The New York Times, and for the IAAF.

Complete results for individuals, for teams, medallists, and the results of British athletes who took part were published.

== Race results ==
=== Men's short race (4 km) ===
==== Individual ====
Rank	Athlete	Country	Time
1st place, gold medalist(s)	Kenenisa Bekele	Ethiopia	11:31
2nd place, silver medalist(s)	Gebre-egziabher Gebremariam	Ethiopia	11:36
3rd place, bronze medalist(s)	Maregu Zewdie	Ethiopia	11:42
4	Abdullah Ahmed Hassan	Qatar	11:44
5	Saif Saeed Shaheen	Qatar	11:44
6	Eliud Kirui	Kenya	11:45
7	Isaac Songok	Kenya	11:45
8	Sultan Khamis Zaman	Qatar	11:50
9	Craig Mottram	Australia	11:51
10	Adil Kaouch	Morocco	11:56
11	Dejene Berhanu	Ethiopia	11:56
12	Tarek Boukensa	Algeria	11:56
13	Alejandro Suárez	Mexico	11:57
14	Carlos García	Spain	11:58
15	Bouabdallah Tahri	France	11:58
16	Alistair Cragg	Ireland	11:58
17	Kevin Sullivan	Canada	11:58
18	Paul Morrison	Canada	11:59
19	Abraham Chebii	Kenya	11:59
20	Kiplimo Muneria	Kenya	12:00
21	Boniface Kiprotich Songok	Kenya	12:01
22	Abdulaziz Al-Ameri	Qatar	12:03
23	Ali Al-Dawoodi	Qatar	12:05
24	Ridouane Es-Saadi	Belgium	12:06
25	Michael Power	Australia	12:06
26	Samir Moussaoui	Algeria	12:06
27	Damian Paul Chopa	Tanzania	12:07
28	Zouhair Ouerdi	Morocco	12:09
29	Hussen Adilo	Ethiopia	12:10
30	Hamid Ezzine	Morocco	12:11
31	Mohamed Awol	Ethiopia	12:12
32	John Kibowen	Kenya	12:12
33	Robert Gary	United States	12:12
34	Benoit Nicolas	France	12:14
35	Umberto Pusterla	Italy	12:15
36	Luke Watson	United States	12:17
37	Andy Graffin	United Kingdom	12:19
38	Mohamed Khaldi	Algeria	12:20
39	Amanuel Waldeselassie	Eritrea	12:21
40	Mário Teixeira	Portugal	12:22
41	Joël Bourgeois	Canada	12:23
42	Nick Willis	New Zealand	12:23
43	Nourreddine Bourfaa	Algeria	12:23
44	Cosimo Caliandro	Italy	12:23
45	Manuel Damião	Portugal	12:23
46	Sandu Rebenciuc	United States	12:23
47	Wim Borms	Belgium	12:24
48	Jared Cordes	United States	12:24
49	Antonio David Jiménez	Spain	12:25
50	Ali Abdalla	Eritrea	12:25
51	Ali Ezzine	Morocco	12:26
52	Ryan Hayden	Canada	12:26
53	Rafał Wójcik	Poland	12:27
54	Mourad Marofit	Morocco	12:27
55	José Maduro	Portugal	12:27
56	Cutbert Nyasango	Zimbabwe	12:27
57	Ahmed Naïli	Algeria	12:28
58	Ian Connor	United States	12:29
59	José Luis Blanco	Spain	12:30
60	Isaiah Festa	United States	12:30
61	Egide Manirazika	Burundi	12:31
62	Reid Coolsaet	Canada	12:31
63	Byron Piedra	Ecuador	12:32
64	Robert Connolly	Ireland	12:32
65	Lorenzo Perrone	Italy	12:33
66	Rui Silva	Portugal	12:33
67	Francis Munthali	Malawi	12:34
68	Aleksandr Sekletov	Russia	12:35
69	Habtai Kifletsion	Eritrea	12:36
70	Thomas Benz	Switzerland	12:36
71	Antonio Manuel Martínez	Spain	12:36
72	Isaac Viciosa	Spain	12:37
73	Daniel Vögeli	Switzerland	12:37
74	Gianni Crepaldi	Italy	12:38
75	Abdelhalim Zahraoui	Morocco	12:38
76	Jay Cantin	Canada	12:38
77	Licinio Pimentel	Portugal	12:39
78	Stijn van den Velde	Belgium	12:39
79	Sveinn Margeirsson	Iceland	12:40
80	El-Mokhtar Benhari	France	12:40
81	Aléxis Abraham	France	12:40
82	Walter Jenni	Switzerland	12:41
83	Musa Ninga	Tanzania	12:42
84	Cesar Pilaluisa	Ecuador	12:42
85	Boštjan Buč	Slovenia	12:43
86	Pavel Shapovalov	Russia	12:43
87	Rob Birchall	United Kingdom	12:44
88	Celso Ficagna	Brazil	12:45
89	Philipp Bandi	Switzerland	12:45
90	Rees Buck	New Zealand	12:45
91	Johan Vermeiren	Belgium	12:45
92	Aleksandr Orlov	Russia	12:46
93	Andrew Baddeley	United Kingdom	12:46
94	Nabil Ghoulam	France	12:46
95	Khamis Abdulla Saifeldin	Qatar	12:49
96	Yoshitaka Iwamizu	Japan	12:50
97	Jonathan Morales	Mexico	12:50
98	Aleksey Gurkin	Russia	12:51
99	Pedro Ribeiro	Portugal	12:52
100	Edgar Chancusig	Ecuador	12:53
101	Alastair Stevenson	Australia	12:54
102	Néstor Nieves	Venezuela	12:56
103	Michael Shelley	Australia	13:00
104	Frédéric Desmedt	Belgium	13:01
105	Abrha Adhanom	Eritrea	13:03
106	Halil Akkaş	Turkey	13:03
107	Yair Cedazo	Mexico	13:03
108	Víctor Martínez	Andorra	13:06
109	Michael Maechler	Switzerland	13:06
110	Denis Bagrev	Kyrgyzstan	13:08
111	Richard Arias	Ecuador	13:09
112	Cayetano Hernandez	Mexico	13:09
113	Sergio Gallardo	Spain	13:12
114	Micxhael Tesfay	Eritrea	13:14
115	David Ruschena	Australia	13:17
116	Tom van Rooy	Belgium	13:18
117	Miguel Ángel García	Venezuela	13:19
118	Björn Margeirsson	Iceland	13:20
119	Alexandr Sinitsyn	Kazakhstan	13:21
120	Hussein Awada	Lebanon	13:23
121	Stephen Rogart	Tanzania	13:24
122	Josep Sansa	Andorra	13:24
123	Pius Stucki	Switzerland	13:26
124	Nader Al-Nasry	Palestine	13:27
125	Alexander Greaux	Puerto Rico	13:28
126	Simon Labiche	Seychelles	13:29
127	Moisés Iñiguez	Mexico	13:29
128	Nozimjon Irmatov	Tajikistan	13:31
129	Dario Nemec	Croatia	13:31
130	Agzam Aliyev	Uzbekistan	13:33
131	Misgina Kifleyesus	Eritrea	13:45
132	Vladimir Tonchinskiy	Belarus	13:50
133	Mario Jorge Santivañez Beltran	Bolivia	13:55
134	Fikret Gafarov	Azerbaijan	13:56
135	Jean-Berchmans Ndayisenga	Burundi	13:57
136	Ronny Marie	Seychelles	13:58
137	Sigurbjörn Arni Arngrímson	Iceland	14:02
138	Serdar Nurmuradov	Turkmenistan	14:22
139	Vladimir Escajadillo	Peru	14:43
—	Noureddine Athamna	Algeria	DNF
—	Julius Gidabuday	Tanzania	DNS
—	Freddy González	Venezuela	DNS
—	Kelvin Pangiso	Zimbabwe	DNS

==== Teams ====
Rank	Team	Points
1st place, gold medalist(s)	Ethiopia: Kenenisa Bekele / 1; Gebre-egziabher Gebremariam / 2; Maregu Zewdie / 3; Dejene Berhanu / 11; (Hussen Adilo) / (29); (Mohamed Awol) / (31)	17
2nd place, silver medalist(s)	Qatar: Abdullah Ahmed Hassan / 4; Saif Saeed Shaheen / 5; Sultan Khamis Zaman / 8; Abdulaziz Al-Ameri / 22; (Ali Al-Dawoodi) / (23); (Khamis Abdulla Saifeldin) / (95)	39
3rd place, bronze medalist(s)	Kenya: Eliud Kirui / 6; Isaac Songok / 7; Abraham Chebii / 19; Kiplimo Muneria / 20; (Boniface Kiprotich Songok) / (21); (John Kibowen) / (32)	52
4	Algeria: Tarek Boukensa / 12; Samir Moussaoui / 26; Mohamed Khaldi / 38; Nourreddine Bourfaa / 43; (Ahmed Naïli) / (57); (Noureddine Athamna) / (DNF)	119
5	Morocco: Adil Kaouch / 10; Zouhair Ouerdi / 28; Hamid Ezzine / 30; Ali Ezzine / 51; (Mourad Marofit) / (54); (Abdelhalim Zahraoui) / (75)	119
6	Canada: Kevin Sullivan / 17; Paul Morrison / 18; Joël Bourgeois / 41; Ryan Hayden / 52; (Reid Coolsaet) / (62); (Jay Cantin) / (76)	128
7	United States: Robert Gary / 33; Luke Watson / 36; Sandu Rebenciuc / 46; Jared Cordes / 48; (Ian Connor) / (58); (Isaiah Festa) / (60)	163
8	Spain: Carlos García / 14; Antonio David Jiménez / 49; José Luis Blanco / 59; Antonio Manuel Martínez / 71; (Isaac Viciosa) / (72); (Sergio Gallardo) / (113)	193
9	Portugal: Mário Teixeira / 40; Manuel Damião / 45; José Maduro / 55; Rui Silva / 66; (Licinio Pimentel) / (77); (Pedro Ribeiro) / (99)	206
10	France: Bouabdallah Tahri / 15; Benoit Nicolas / 34; El-Mokhtar Benhari / 80; Aléxis Abraham / 81; (Nabil Ghoulam) / (94)	210
11	Italy: Umberto Pusterla / 35; Cosimo Caliandro / 44; Lorenzo Perrone / 65; Gianni Crepaldi / 74	218
12	Australia: Craig Mottram / 9; Michael Power / 25; Alastair Stevenson / 101; Michael Shelley / 103; (David Ruschena) / (115)	238
13	Belgium: Ridouane Es-Saadi / 24; Wim Borms / 47; Stijn van den Velde / 78; Johan Vermeiren / 91; (Frédéric Desmedt) / (104); (Tom van Rooy) / (116)	240
14	Eritrea: Amanuel Waldeselassie / 39; Ali Abdalla / 50; Habtai Kifletsion / 69; Abrha Adhanom / 105; (Micxhael Tesfay) / (114); (Misgina Kifleyesus) / (131)	263
15	Switzerland: Thomas Benz / 70; Daniel Vögeli / 73; Walter Jenni / 82; Philipp Bandi / 89; (Michael Maechler) / (109); (Pius Stucki) / (123)	314
16	Mexico: Alejandro Suárez / 13; Jonathan Morales / 97; Yair Cedazo / 107; Cayetano Hernandez / 112; (Moisés Iñiguez) / (127)	329
17	Russia: Aleksandr Sekletov / 68; Pavel Shapovalov / 86; Aleksandr Orlov / 92; Aleksey Gurkin / 98	344
18	Ecuador: Byron Piedra / 63; Cesar Pilaluisa / 84; Edgar Chancusig / 100; Richard Arias / 111	358

- Note: Athletes in parentheses did not score for the team result

== Participation ==
According to an unofficial count, 140 athletes from 47 countries participated in the Men's short race.

- Algeria (6)
- Andorra (2)
- Australia (5)
- Azerbaijan (1)
- Belarus (1)
- Belgium (6)
- Bolivia (1)
- Brazil (1)
- Burundi (2)
- Canada (6)
- Croatia (1)
- Ecuador (4)
- Eritrea (6)
- Ethiopia (6)
- France (5)
- Iceland (3)
- Ireland (2)
- Italy (4)
- Japan (1)
- Kazakhstan (1)
- Kenya (6)
- Kyrgyzstan (1)
- Lebanon (1)
- Malawi (1)
- Mexico (5)
- Morocco (6)
- New Zealand (2)
- Palestine (1)
- Peru (1)
- Poland (1)
- Portugal (6)
- Puerto Rico (1)
- Qatar (6)
- Russia (4)
- Seychelles (2)
- Slovenia (1)
- Spain (6)
- Switzerland (6)
- Tajikistan (1)
- Tanzania (3)
- Turkey (1)
- Turkmenistan (1)
- United Kingdom (3)
- United States (6)
- Uzbekistan (1)
- Venezuela (2)
- Zimbabwe (1)

== See also ==
- 2004 IAAF World Cross Country Championships – Senior men's race
- 2004 IAAF World Cross Country Championships – Junior men's race
- 2004 IAAF World Cross Country Championships – Senior women's race
- 2004 IAAF World Cross Country Championships – Women's short race
- 2004 IAAF World Cross Country Championships – Junior women's race
