= 2004 IAAF World Cross Country Championships – Senior women's race =

Athletic competition

Senior women's race at the 2004 IAAF World Cross Country Championships
- Organisers: IAAF
- Edition: 32nd
- Date: March 20
- Host city: Brussels, Belgium
- Venue: Ossegem Park
- Events: 1
- Distances: 8 km – Senior women
- Participation: 97 athletes from 30 nations

The Senior women's race at the 2004 IAAF World Cross Country Championships was held at the Ossegem Park in Brussels, Belgium, on March 20, 2004. Reports of the event were given in The New York Times, and for the IAAF.

Complete results for individuals, for teams, medallists, and the results of British athletes who took part were published.

== Race results ==
=== Senior women's race (8 km) ===
==== Individual ====
Rank	Athlete	Country	Time
1st place, gold medalist(s)	Benita Johnson	Australia	27:17
2nd place, silver medalist(s)	Ejagayehu Dibaba	Ethiopia	27:29
3rd place, bronze medalist(s)	Worknesh Kidane	Ethiopia	27:34
4	Alice Timbilil	Kenya	27:36
5	Teyiba Erkesso	Ethiopia	27:43
6	Lornah Kiplagat	Netherlands	27:56
7	Eunice Chepkorir	Kenya	27:59
8	Émilie Mondor	Canada	28:01
9	Fridah Domongole	Kenya	28:03
10	Sally Barsosio	Kenya	28:08
11	Kathy Butler	United Kingdom	28:13
12	Olivera Jevtić	Serbia and Montenegro	28:18
13	Liz Yelling	United Kingdom	28:25
14	Margaret Maury	France	28:29
15	Kate O'Neill	United States	28:37
16	Derartu Tulu	Ethiopia	28:39
17	Hayley McGregor	Australia	28:41
18	Patrizia Tisi	Italy	28:45
19	Zahia Dahmani	France	28:46
20	Jane Ngotho	Kenya	28:47
21	Helena Sampaio	Portugal	28:48
22	Louise Damen	United Kingdom	28:48
23	Suzanne Ritter	Germany	28:53
24	Rkia Chébili	France	28:56
25	Kathy Newberry	United States	28:56
26	Anna Thompson	Australia	28:57
27	Katie McGregor	United States	28:57
28	Natalie Harvey	United Kingdom	28:58
29	Hayley Yelling	United Kingdom	29:00
30	Catherina McKiernan	Ireland	29:04
31	Ann Marie Schwabe	United States	29:05
32	Rebecca Stallwood	Canada	29:06
33	Fatiha Klilech-Fauvel	France	29:07
34	Irene Kipchumba	Kenya	29:09
35	Christelle Daunay	France	29:15
36	Justyna Bąk	Poland	29:20
37	Yoshiko Ichikawa	Japan	29:20
38	Laura O'Neill	United States	29:27
39	Josephine Deemay	Tanzania	29:31
40	Anália Rosa	Portugal	29:38
41	Nadia Al-Jaffaini	Bahrain	29:38
42	Mounia Aboulahcen	Belgium	29:40
43	Eyerusalem Kuma	Ethiopia	29:41
44	Teresa Recio	Spain	29:46
45	Malika Asahssah	Morocco	29:48
46	Nebiat Habtemariam	Eritrea	29:51
47	Alessandra Aguilar	Spain	29:52
48	Rosemary Ryan	Ireland	29:53
49	Ana Dias	Portugal	29:59
50	Fatima Yvelain	France	30:00
51	Kenza Wahbi	Morocco	30:01
52	Yumi Sato	Japan	30:02
53	Miho Notagashira	Japan	30:05
54	Judit Plá	Spain	30:06
55	Georgie Clarke	Australia	30:07
56	Anja Smolders	Belgium	30:08
57	Mónica Rosa	Portugal	30:08
58	Maria Zambrano	Canada	30:09
59	Alemtsehay Hailu	Ethiopia	30:12
60	Olga Machado	Portugal	30:13
61	Amaia Piedra	Spain	30:16
62	Kim Offergeld	Belgium	30:17
63	Kristina Rody	Canada	30:17
64	Kazue Ogoshi	Japan	30:20
65	Hafida Izem	Morocco	30:23
66	Elisabete Lopes	Portugal	30:26
67	Antje Looper	Netherlands	30:26
68	Stephanie de Croock	Belgium	30:27
69	Pauline Curley	Ireland	30:27
70	Stephanie Mills	Canada	30:28
71	Jolene Byrne	Ireland	30:31
72	Silvia Montane	Spain	30:40
73	Lisa Labrecque	Canada	30:42
74	Faith Kamangila	Zimbabwe	30:43
75	Fionnuala Britton	Ireland	30:43
76	Corinne Debaets	Belgium	30:49
77	Drissia Nadym	Morocco	30:52
78	Beatriz Ros	Spain	30:55
79	Molly Austin	United States	31:00
80	Sylvie Verthé	Belgium	31:11
81	Restituta Joseph	Tanzania	31:27
82	Emeliana Joseph	Tanzania	31:43
83	Niamh O'Sullivan	Ireland	31:48
84	Kylie Risk	Australia	32:04
85	Maria Moraes	Brazil	32:13
86	Rosa Apaza	Bolivia	32:19
87	Zenaida Maldonado	Puerto Rico	32:54
88	Elsa Monterroso	Guatemala	33:21
89	Olesia Orlova	Kyrgyzstan	33:23
90	María Díaz	Puerto Rico	33:42
91	Regina Rendazza	U.S. Virgin Islands	33:49
92	Veronika Kirgizbayeva	Uzbekistan	35:37
93	Lisha Hamilton	U.S. Virgin Islands	35:42
94	Ruth David	U.S. Virgin Islands	38:12
95	Rachel Witty	U.S. Virgin Islands	38:24
96	Anna Motorina	Turkmenistan	40:06
—	Soud Kanbouchia	Morocco	DNF
—	Hisae Yoshimatsu	Japan	DNS
—	Catherine Chikwakwa	Malawi	DNS
—	Hawa Hussein	Tanzania	DNS

==== Teams ====
Rank	Team	Points
1st place, gold medalist(s)	Ethiopia: Ejagayehu Dibaba / 2; Worknesh Kidane / 3; Teyiba Erkesso / 5; Derartu Tulu / 16; (Eyerusalem Kuma) / (43); (Alemtsehay Hailu) / (59)	26
2nd place, silver medalist(s)	Kenya: Alice Timbilil / 4; Eunice Chepkorir / 7; Fridah Domongole / 9; Sally Barsosio / 10; (Jane Ngotho) / (20); (Irene Kipchumba) / (34)	30
3rd place, bronze medalist(s)	United Kingdom: Kathy Butler / 11; Liz Yelling / 13; Louise Damen / 22; Natalie Harvey / 28; (Hayley Yelling) / (29)	74
4	France: Margaret Maury / 14; Zahia Dahmani / 19; Rkia Chébili / 24; Fatiha Klilech-Fauvel / 33; (Christelle Daunay) / (35); (Fatima Yvelain) / (50)	90
5	United States: Kate O'Neill / 15; Kathy Newberry / 25; Katie McGregor / 27; Ann Marie Schwabe / 31; (Laura O'Neill) / (38); (Molly Austin) / (79)	98
6	Australia: Benita Johnson / 1; Hayley McGregor / 17; Anna Thompson / 26; Georgie Clarke / 55; (Kylie Risk) / (84)	99
7	Canada: Émilie Mondor / 8; Rebecca Stallwood / 32; Maria Zambrano / 58; Kristina Rody / 63; (Stephanie Mills) / (70); (Lisa Labrecque) / (73)	161
8	Portugal: Helena Sampaio / 21; Anália Rosa / 40; Ana Dias / 49; Mónica Rosa / 57; (Olga Machado) / (60); (Elisabete Lopes) / (66)	167
9	Spain: Teresa Recio / 44; Alessandra Aguilar / 47; Judit Plá / 54; Amaia Piedra / 61; (Silvia Montane) / (72); (Beatriz Ros) / (78)	206
10	Japan: Yoshiko Ichikawa / 37; Yumi Sato / 52; Miho Notagashira / 53; Kazue Ogoshi / 64	206
11	Ireland: Catherina McKiernan / 30; Rosemary Ryan / 48; Pauline Curley / 69; Jolene Byrne / 71; (Fionnuala Britton) / (75); (Niamh O'Sullivan) / (83)	218
12	Belgium: Mounia Aboulahcen / 42; Anja Smolders / 56; Kim Offergeld / 62; Stephanie de Croock / 68; (Corinne Debaets) / (76); (Sylvie Verthé) / (80)	228
13	Morocco: Malika Asahssah / 45; Kenza Wahbi / 51; Hafida Izem / 65; Drissia Nadym / 77; (Soud Kanbouchia) / (DNF)	238
14	U.S. Virgin Islands: Regina Rendazza / 91; Lisha Hamilton / 93; Ruth David / 94; Rachel Witty / 95	373

- Note: Athletes in parentheses did not score for the team result

== Participation ==
According to an unofficial count, 97 athletes from 30 countries participated in the Senior women's race. The announced athlete from Malawi did not show.

- Australia (5)
- Bahrain (1)
- Belgium (6)
- Bolivia (1)
- Brazil (1)
- Canada (6)
- Eritrea (1)
- Ethiopia (6)
- France (6)
- Germany (1)
- Guatemala (1)
- Ireland (6)
- Italy (1)
- Japan (4)
- Kenya (6)
- Kyrgyzstan (1)
- Morocco (5)
- Netherlands (2)
- Poland (1)
- Portugal (6)
- Puerto Rico (2)
- Serbia and Montenegro (1)
- Spain (6)
- Tanzania (3)
- Turkmenistan (1)
- United Kingdom (5)
- United States (6)
- U.S. Virgin Islands (4)
- Uzbekistan (1)
- Zimbabwe (1)

== See also ==
- 2004 IAAF World Cross Country Championships – Senior men's race
- 2004 IAAF World Cross Country Championships – Men's short race
- 2004 IAAF World Cross Country Championships – Junior men's race
- 2004 IAAF World Cross Country Championships – Women's short race
- 2004 IAAF World Cross Country Championships – Junior women's race
