= 2004 IAAF World Cross Country Championships =

Coordinates: 50°53′34″N 4°20′48″E

- Organisers: IAAF
- Edition: 32nd
- Date: March 20/21
- Host city: Brussels, Belgium
- Venue: Ossegem Park
- Events: 6
- Distances: 12 km – Senior men 4 km – Men's short 8 km – Junior men 8 km – Senior women 4 km – Women's short 6 km – Junior women
- Participation: 673 athletes from 72 nations

The 2004 IAAF World Cross Country Championships took place on March 20/21, 2004. The races were held at the Ossegem Park in Brussels, the capital of Belgium. Reports of the event were given in The New York Times, and for the IAAF.

The new team scores introduced in 2002 were reverted to the original form as used in 2001 and earlier.

Complete results for senior men, for senior men's teams, for men's short race, for men's short race teams, for junior men, for junior men's teams, senior women, for senior women's teams, for women's short race, for women's short race teams, for junior women, for junior women's teams, medallists, and the results of British athletes who took part were published.

== Medallists ==
Event	Gold		Silver		Bronze	
Individual
Senior men (12 km)	Kenenisa Bekele; Ethiopia	35:52	Gebre-egziabher Gebremariam; Ethiopia	36:10	Sileshi Sihine; Ethiopia	36:11
Men's short (4 km)	Kenenisa Bekele; Ethiopia	11:31	Gebre-egziabher Gebremariam; Ethiopia	11:36	Maregu Zewdie; Ethiopia	11:42
Junior men (8 km)	Meba Tadesse; Ethiopia	24:01	Boniface Kiprop; Uganda	24:03	Ernest Meli Kimeli; Kenya	24:16
Senior women (8 km)	Benita Johnson; Australia	27:17	Ejagayehu Dibaba; Ethiopia	27:29	Worknesh Kidane; Ethiopia	27:34
Women's short (4 km)	Edith Masai; Kenya	13:07	Tirunesh Dibaba; Ethiopia	13:09	Teyiba Erkesso; Ethiopia	13:11
Junior women (6 km)	Meselech Melkamu; Ethiopia	20:48	Aziza Aliyu; Ethiopia	20:53	Mestawat Tadesse; Ethiopia	20:56
Team
Senior men	Ethiopia	14	Kenya	30	Eritrea	66
Men's short	Ethiopia	17	Qatar	39	Kenya	52
Junior men	Kenya	20	Ethiopia	25	Uganda	33
Senior women	Ethiopia	26	Kenya	30	United Kingdom	74
Women's short	Ethiopia	19	Kenya	21	Canada	87
Junior women	Ethiopia	10	Kenya	36	Japan	67

== Race results ==
=== Senior men's race (12 km) ===
Individual race
Rank	Athlete	Country	Time
1st place, gold medalist(s)	Kenenisa Bekele	Ethiopia	35:52
2nd place, silver medalist(s)	Gebre-egziabher Gebremariam	Ethiopia	36:10
3rd place, bronze medalist(s)	Sileshi Sihine	Ethiopia	36:11
4	Eliud Kipchoge	Kenya	36:34
5	Charles Kamathi	Kenya	36:36
6	Zersenay Tadesse	Eritrea	36:37
7	Fabiano Joseph	Tanzania	36:49
8	Yibeltal Admassu	Ethiopia	36:52
9	Yonas Kifle	Eritrea	36:53
10	Wilberforce Talel	Kenya	37:01
11	John Cheruiyot Korir	Kenya	37:03
12	Hicham Chatt	Morocco	37:09
Full results

Teams
Rank	Team	Points
1st place, gold medalist(s)	Ethiopia: Kenenisa Bekele / 1; Gebre-egziabher Gebremariam / 2; Sileshi Sihine / 3; Yibeltal Admassu / 8; (Tibebu Yenew) / (15); (Ketema Nigusse) / (36)	14
2nd place, silver medalist(s)	Kenya: Eliud Kipchoge / 4; Charles Kamathi / 5; Wilberforce Talel / 10; John Cheruiyot Korir / 11; (Simion Tuitoek) / (27); (Richard Limo) / (32)	30
3rd place, bronze medalist(s)	Eritrea: Zersenay Tadesse / 6; Yonas Kifle / 9; Tesfayohannes Mesfen / 22; Samson Kiflemariam / 29; (Tekle Menghisteab) / (74)	66
4	Morocco	68
5	Australia	101
6	Tanzania	118
7	Rwanda	164
8	Spain	166
Full results

- Note: Athletes in parentheses did not score for the team result

=== Men's short race (4 km) ===
Individual race
Rank	Athlete	Country	Time
1st place, gold medalist(s)	Kenenisa Bekele	Ethiopia	11:31
2nd place, silver medalist(s)	Gebre-egziabher Gebremariam	Ethiopia	11:36
3rd place, bronze medalist(s)	Maregu Zewdie	Ethiopia	11:42
4	Abdullah Ahmed Hassan	Qatar	11:44
5	Saif Saeed Shaheen	Qatar	11:44
6	Eliud Kirui	Kenya	11:45
7	Isaac Songok	Kenya	11:45
8	Sultan Khamis Zaman	Qatar	11:50
9	Craig Mottram	Australia	11:51
10	Adil Kaouch	Morocco	11:56
11	Dejene Berhanu	Ethiopia	11:56
12	Tarek Boukensa	Algeria	11:56
Full results

Teams
Rank	Team	Points
1st place, gold medalist(s)	Ethiopia: Kenenisa Bekele / 1; Gebre-egziabher Gebremariam / 2; Maregu Zewdie / 3; Dejene Berhanu / 11; (Hussen Adilo) / (29); (Mohamed Awol) / (31)	17
2nd place, silver medalist(s)	Qatar: Abdullah Ahmed Hassan / 4; Saif Saeed Shaheen / 5; Sultan Khamis Zaman / 8; Abdulaziz Al-Ameri / 22; (Ali Al-Dawoodi) / (23); (Khamis Abdulla Saifeldin) / (95)	39
3rd place, bronze medalist(s)	Kenya: Eliud Kirui / 6; Isaac Songok / 7; Abraham Chebii / 19; Kiplimo Muneria / 20; (Boniface Kiprotich Songok) / (21); (John Kibowen) / (32)	52
4	Algeria	119
5	Morocco	119
6	Canada	128
7	United States	163
8	Spain	193
Full results

- Note: Athletes in parentheses did not score for the team result

=== Junior men's race (8 km) ===
Individual race
Rank	Athlete	Country	Time
1st place, gold medalist(s)	Meba Tadesse	Ethiopia	24:01
2nd place, silver medalist(s)	Boniface Kiprop	Uganda	24:03
3rd place, bronze medalist(s)	Ernest Meli Kimeli	Kenya	24:16
4	Barnabas Kosgei	Kenya	24:24
5	Mulugeta Wendimu	Ethiopia	24:44
6	Hosea Macharinyang	Kenya	24:51
7	Ronald Rutto	Kenya	25:04
8	Moses Aliwa	Uganda	25:08
9	Tessema Absher	Ethiopia	25:12
10	Yirefu Birhanu	Ethiopia	25:18
11	Harbert Okuti	Uganda	25:21
12	Nicholas Kwemoi	Uganda	25:22
Full results

Teams
Rank	Team	Points
1st place, gold medalist(s)	Kenya: Ernest Meli Kimeli / 3; Barnabas Kosgei / 4; Hosea Macharinyang / 6; Ronald Rutto / 7; (Moses Masai) / (16); (Stanley Kipkosgei Salil) / (21)	20
2nd place, silver medalist(s)	Ethiopia: Meba Tadesse / 1; Mulugeta Wendimu / 5; Tessema Absher / 9; Yirefu Birhanu / 10; (Kabtamu Reta) / (20)	25
3rd place, bronze medalist(s)	Uganda: Boniface Kiprop / 2; Moses Aliwa / 8; Harbert Okuti / 11; Nicholas Kwemoi / 12	33
4	Morocco	61
5	Japan	105
6	Algeria	157
7	United States	175
8	Russia	179
Full results

- Note: Athletes in parentheses did not score for the team result

=== Senior women's race (8 km) ===
Individual race
Rank	Athlete	Country	Time
1st place, gold medalist(s)	Benita Johnson	Australia	27:17
2nd place, silver medalist(s)	Ejagayehu Dibaba	Ethiopia	27:29
3rd place, bronze medalist(s)	Worknesh Kidane	Ethiopia	27:34
4	Alice Timbilil	Kenya	27:36
5	Teyiba Erkesso	Ethiopia	27:43
6	Lornah Kiplagat	Netherlands	27:56
7	Eunice Chepkorir	Kenya	27:59
8	Émilie Mondor	Canada	28:01
9	Fridah Domongole	Kenya	28:03
10	Sally Barsosio	Kenya	28:08
11	Kathy Butler	United Kingdom	28:13
12	Olivera Jevtić	Serbia and Montenegro	28:18
Full results

Teams
Rank	Team	Points
1st place, gold medalist(s)	Ethiopia: Ejagayehu Dibaba / 2; Worknesh Kidane / 3; Teyiba Erkesso / 5; Derartu Tulu / 16; (Eyerusalem Kuma) / (43); (Alemtsehay Hailu) / (59)	26
2nd place, silver medalist(s)	Kenya: Alice Timbilil / 4; Eunice Chepkorir / 7; Fridah Domongole / 9; Sally Barsosio / 10; (Jane Ngotho) / (20); (Irene Kipchumba) / (34)	30
3rd place, bronze medalist(s)	United Kingdom: Kathy Butler / 11; Liz Yelling / 13; Louise Damen / 22; Natalie Harvey / 28; (Hayley Yelling) / (29)	74
4	France	90
5	United States	98
6	Australia	99
7	Canada	161
8	Portugal	167
Full results

- Note: Athletes in parentheses did not score for the team result

=== Women's short race (4 km) ===
Individual race
Rank	Athlete	Country	Time
1st place, gold medalist(s)	Edith Masai	Kenya	13:07
2nd place, silver medalist(s)	Tirunesh Dibaba	Ethiopia	13:09
3rd place, bronze medalist(s)	Teyiba Erkesso	Ethiopia	13:11
4	Worknesh Kidane	Ethiopia	13:14
5	Isabella Ochichi	Kenya	13:18
6	Olga Romanova	Russia	13:19
7	Peninah Chepchumba	Kenya	13:22
8	Vivian Cheruiyot	Kenya	13:23
9	Jane Wanjiku	Kenya	13:23
10	Ejagayehu Dibaba	Ethiopia	13:23
11	Amane Godana	Ethiopia	13:27
12	Zahra Ouaziz	Morocco	13:33
Full results

Teams
Rank	Team	Points
1st place, gold medalist(s)	Ethiopia: Tirunesh Dibaba / 2; Teyiba Erkesso / 3; Worknesh Kidane / 4; Ejagayehu Dibaba / 10; (Amane Godana) / (11); (Bezunesh Bekele) / (18)	19
2nd place, silver medalist(s)	Kenya: Edith Masai / 1; Isabella Ochichi / 5; Peninah Chepchumba / 7; Vivian Cheruiyot / 8; (Jane Wanjiku) / (9); (Beatrice Chepchumba) / (21)	21
3rd place, bronze medalist(s)	Canada: Émilie Mondor / 13; Carmen Douma-Hussar / 17; Malindi Elmore / 22; Tina Connelly / 35; (Courtney Inman) / (37); (Leah Pells) / (57)	87
4	Morocco	101
5	United Kingdom	125
6	Portugal	127
7	United States	141
8	Spain	191
Full results

- Note: Athletes in parentheses did not score for the team result

=== Junior women's race (6 km) ===
Individual race
Rank	Athlete	Country	Time
1st place, gold medalist(s)	Meselech Melkamu	Ethiopia	20:48
2nd place, silver medalist(s)	Aziza Aliyu	Ethiopia	20:53
3rd place, bronze medalist(s)	Mestawat Tadesse	Ethiopia	20:56
4	Workitu Ayanu	Ethiopia	20:59
5	Chemutai Rionotukei	Kenya	21:04
6	Jebichi Yator	Kenya	21:05
7	Yenealem Ayano	Ethiopia	21:05
8	Bao Guiying	China	21:05
9	Gladys Chemweno	Kenya	21:13
10	Hitomi Miyai	Japan	21:15
11	Yuko Nohara	Japan	21:19
12	Siham Hilali	Morocco	21:31
Full results

Teams
Rank	Team	Points
1st place, gold medalist(s)	Ethiopia: Meselech Melkamu / 1; Aziza Aliyu / 2; Mestawat Tadesse / 3; Workitu Ayanu / 4; (Yenealem Ayano) / (7); (Hirut Mengestu) / (15)	10
2nd place, silver medalist(s)	Kenya: Chemutai Rionotukei / 5; Jebichi Yator / 6; Gladys Chemweno / 9; Everline Kemunto Kimwei / 16; (Emmy Chepkirui) / (17); (Nelly Chepkurui) / (18)	36
3rd place, bronze medalist(s)	Japan: Hitomi Miyai / 10; Yuko Nohara / 11; Hitomi Niiya / 19; Kei Terada / 27; (Tomoka Inadomi) / (29); (Misaki Katsumata) / (33)	67
4	United States	120
5	Russia	160
6	China	169
7	South Africa	185
8	Morocco	196
Full results

- Note: Athletes in parentheses did not score for the team result

== Medal table (unofficial) ==
Rank	Nation	Gold	Silver	Bronze	Total
1	Ethiopia	9	6	5	20
2	Kenya	2	4	2	8
3	Australia	1	0	0	1
4	Uganda	0	1	1	2
5	Qatar	0	1	0	1
6	Canada	0	0	1	1
6	Eritrea	0	0	1	1
6	Great Britain	0	0	1	1
6	Japan	0	0	1	1
Totals (9 entries)		12	12	12	36

- Note: Totals include both individual and team medals, with medals in the team competition counting as one medal.

== Participation ==
According to an unofficial count, 673 athletes from 72 countries participated. This is in agreement with the official numbers as published. The announced athletes from Guinea did not show.

- Algeria (12)
- Andorra (2)
- Australia (16)
- Azerbaijan (2)
- Bahrain (1)
- Belarus (6)
- Belgium (36)
- Bolivia (4)
- Botswana (5)
- Brazil (5)
- Burundi (4)
- Canada (33)
- Central African Republic (1)
- Chile (2)
- China (8)
- DR Congo (1)
- Croatia (2)
- Czech Republic (2)
- Ecuador (4)
- Egypt (4)
- Equatorial Guinea (1)
- Eritrea (19)
- Ethiopia (30)
- France (32)
- Germany (1)
- Guatemala (2)
- Hong Kong (1)
- Hungary (1)
- Iceland (3)
- Ireland (17)
- Italy (11)
- Japan (23)
- Kazakhstan (2)
- Kenya (36)
- Kyrgyzstan (3)
- Lebanon (2)
- Macau (1)
- Malawi (5)
- Mexico (7)
- Morocco (34)
- Nepal (4)
- Netherlands (6)
- New Zealand (9)
- Palestine (4)
- Peru (1)
- Poland (4)
- Portugal (23)
- Puerto Rico (13)
- Qatar (6)
- Romania (2)
- Russia (15)
- Rwanda (10)
- Serbia and Montenegro (3)
- Seychelles (2)
- Slovenia (2)
- South Africa (12)
- Spain (35)
- Switzerland (13)
- Tajikistan (3)
- Tanzania (13)
- Tunisia (7)
- Turkey (3)
- Turkmenistan (6)
- Uganda (6)
- Ukraine (4)
- United Kingdom (30)
- United States (36)
- U.S. Virgin Islands (5)
- Uzbekistan (6)
- Venezuela (2)
- Zambia (4)
- Zimbabwe (3)

== See also ==
- 2004 IAAF World Cross Country Championships – Senior men's race
- 2004 IAAF World Cross Country Championships – Men's short race
- 2004 IAAF World Cross Country Championships – Junior men's race
- 2004 IAAF World Cross Country Championships – Senior women's race
- 2004 IAAF World Cross Country Championships – Women's short race
- 2004 IAAF World Cross Country Championships – Junior women's race
- 2004 in athletics (track and field)
