= Tadesse =

Tadesse or Tadese is a name of Ethiopian origin. Notable people with the name include:

== Given name ==
- Tadesse Birru (1921–1975), Ethiopian army officer and revolutionary
- Tadesse Mamechae (Tadesse Mamecha Gebre-Tsadik, born 1941), Ethiopian sculptor
- Tadese Tola (born 1987), winner of the 2008 New York City Half Marathon

== Surname ==
- Feyse Tadese (born 1988), Ethiopian half marathon specialist
- Kidane Tadese (born 1987), 2008 Olympian and brother of Zersenay Tadese
- Meba Tadesse (born 1986), team silver medallist in the 2003 World Cross Country Championships
- Mekdes Bekele Tadese (born 1987), 2007 All-Africa Games silver medallist in steeplechase
- Mestawat Tadesse (born 1985), female athlete specialising in 1500 metres
- Sinedu Tadesse (1974–1995), committed murder-suicide on a Harvard University campus
- Zersenay Tadese (born 1982), four-time World Half Marathon champion and Olympic bronze medallist
