= 2004 IAAF World Cross Country Championships – Senior men's race =

Senior men's race at the 2004 IAAF World Cross Country Championships
- Organisers: IAAF
- Edition: 32nd
- Date: March 21
- Host city: Brussels, Belgium
- Venue: Ossegem Park
- Events: 1
- Distances: 12 km – Senior men
- Participation: 136 athletes from 48 nations

The Senior men's race at the 2004 IAAF World Cross Country Championships was held at the Ossegem Park in Brussels, Belgium, on March 21, 2004. Reports of the event were given in The New York Times, and for the IAAF.

Complete results for individuals, for teams, medallists, and the results of British athletes who took part were published.

== Race results ==
=== Senior men's race (12 km) ===
==== Individual ====
Rank	Athlete	Country	Time
1st place, gold medalist(s)	Kenenisa Bekele	Ethiopia	35:52
2nd place, silver medalist(s)	Gebre-egziabher Gebremariam	Ethiopia	36:10
3rd place, bronze medalist(s)	Sileshi Sihine	Ethiopia	36:11
4	Eliud Kipchoge	Kenya	36:34
5	Charles Kamathi	Kenya	36:36
6	Zersenay Tadesse	Eritrea	36:37
7	Fabiano Joseph	Tanzania	36:49
8	Yibeltal Admassu	Ethiopia	36:52
9	Yonas Kifle	Eritrea	36:53
10	Wilberforce Talel	Kenya	37:01
11	John Cheruiyot Korir	Kenya	37:03
12	Hicham Chatt	Morocco	37:09
13	Craig Mottram	Australia	37:10
14	Abderrahim Goumri	Morocco	37:17
15	Tibebu Yenew	Ethiopia	37:26
16	Saïd El Wardi	Morocco	37:29
17	El Hassan Lahssini	France	37:30
18	Dieudonné Disi	Rwanda	37:36
19	Jon Brown	United Kingdom	37:38
20	Stephen Rogart	Tanzania	37:41
21	Lee Troop	Australia	37:43
22	Tesfayohannes Mesfen	Eritrea	37:45
23	Daniel Andrew Sipe	Tanzania	37:50
24	Ridha El Amri	Tunisia	37:52
25	Cutbert Nyasango	Zimbabwe	37:52
26	Ahmed Baday	Morocco	37:54
27	Simion Tuitoek	Kenya	37:54
28	Giuliano Battocletti	Italy	37:58
29	Samson Kiflemariam	Eritrea	37:59
30	Steve Moneghetti	Australia	38:01
31	Tom Compernolle	Belgium	38:02
32	Richard Limo	Kenya	38:03
33	Ricardo Serrano	Spain	38:08
34	Abdi Abdirahman	United States	38:09
35	Jean Baptiste Simukeka	Rwanda	38:10
36	Ketema Nigusse	Ethiopia	38:14
37	Brett Cartwright	Australia	38:15
38	Khalid Zoubaa	France	38:22
39	Eliseo Martín	Spain	38:23
40	Makoto Otsu	Japan	38:23
41	Mauricio Díaz	Chile	38:25
42	José Manuel Martínez	Spain	38:27
43	Ben Noad	United Kingdom	38:27
44	Bob Kennedy	United States	38:28
45	Andrew Letherby	Australia	38:28
46	Michael Ngaaseke	Zimbabwe	38:30
47	Fernando Silva	Portugal	38:33
48	Boiphemelo Selagaboy	Botswana	38:35
49	Jean Bosco Ndagijimana	Rwanda	38:36
50	Glynn Tromans	United Kingdom	38:36
51	Richard Brinker	United States	38:36
52	Alejandro Gómez	Spain	38:37
53	Kaelo Mosalagae	Botswana	38:39
54	Augusto Gomes	France	38:39
55	Obed Mutanya	Zambia	38:42
56	Manuel Silva	Portugal	38:44
57	Carles Castillejo	Spain	38:46
58	Rob Whalley	United Kingdom	38:47
59	Loïc Letellier	France	38:49
60	Rik Ceulemans	Belgium	38:50
61	Alfredo Bráz	Portugal	38:52
62	Rachid Safari	Rwanda	38:53
63	Ridouane Harroufi	Morocco	38:57
64	Piet Desmet	Belgium	38:58
65	Francis Khanje	Malawi	39:00
66	Joseph Simuchimba	Zambia	39:00
67	Joël Bourgeois	Canada	39:01
68	Musa Ninga	Tanzania	39:01
69	Hans Janssens	Belgium	39:08
70	Luís Feiteira	Portugal	39:10
71	Gabalebe Moloko	Botswana	39:16
72	Mark Kenneally	Ireland	39:17
73	Yu Mitsuya	Japan	39:20
74	Tekle Menghisteab	Eritrea	39:20
75	Peter Matthews	Ireland	39:21
76	Quentin Jarmuszewicz	France	39:23
77	Keenetse Moswasi	Botswana	39:25
78	Kenta Oshima	Japan	39:25
79	Patrick Stitzinger	Netherlands	39:28
80	Han Gang	China	39:29
81	Matt Johnston	Canada	39:29
82	Dave Davis	United States	39:30
83	Vinny Mulvey	Ireland	39:30
84	Valens Bivahagumye	Rwanda	39:31
85	Krijn Van Koolwyk	Belgium	39:33
86	Masayuki Obata	Japan	39:33
87	Tiyapo Maso	Botswana	39:34
88	Claudir Rodrigues	Brazil	39:43
89	Koen van Rie	Belgium	39:46
90	Rees Buck	New Zealand	39:48
91	Billy Farquharson	United Kingdom	39:55
92	Shane Nankervis	Australia	40:02
93	Nolan Swanson	United States	40:03
94	Vincent Hatuleke	Zambia	40:03
95	Ernest Ndjissipou	Central African Republic	40:04
96	Faustin Baha	Tanzania	40:04
97	Ahmed El Asery	France	40:09
98	Chris Thompson	United Kingdom	40:09
99	Richard Arias	Ecuador	40:10
100	Cesar Pilaluisa	Ecuador	40:12
101	Chen Mingfu	China	40:15
102	Dermot Donnelly	Ireland	40:22
103	Andrey Chigidinov	Kazakhstan	40:25
104	Edgar Chancusig	Ecuador	40:29
105	Ricardo Ribas	Portugal	40:30
106	Killian Lonergan	Ireland	40:33
107	Jeremy Deere	Canada	40:43
108	Joshua Eberly	United States	41:03
109	Mcmillan Mwansa	Zambia	41:05
110	Steve Osadiuk	Canada	41:11
111	Taylor Murphy	Canada	41:12
112	Cirino Abong	Uganda	41:16
113	Santiago Reyes	Guatemala	41:38
114	Maxim Malenkih	Kyrgyzstan	41:57
115	Ananda Man Shrestha	Nepal	42:23
116	Vasiliy Medvedev	Uzbekistan	42:24
117	Sokhibdjan Sharipov	Tajikistan	42:28
118	Marcos Rivera	Puerto Rico	42:33
119	Nariman Mammodov	Azerbaijan	42:39
120	Jan Kreisinger	Czech Republic	42:48
121	Omar Abdel Latif	Lebanon	43:05
122	Yang Weize	China	43:08
123	Deng Haiyang	China	43:12
124	William Boehlke	U.S. Virgin Islands	43:16
125	Kemal Tuvakuliyev	Turkmenistan	43:19
126	Mohamed Salama	Palestine	43:20
127	Michael Booth	Canada	43:21
128	Cesar Condori	Bolivia	45:31
129	Wong Keng Fai	Macau	49:51
130	Wong Wang Keung	Hong Kong	52:19
—	Delfim Conceição	Portugal	DNF
—	Edgardo Caban	Puerto Rico	DNF
—	Byron Piedra	Ecuador	DNF
—	Alejandro Suárez	Mexico	DNF
—	Buenaventura Yanez	Equatorial Guinea	DNF
—	Abdellah Falil	Morocco	DNF
—	Egide Manirazika	Burundi	DNS
—	Jean-Berchmans Ndayisenga	Burundi	DNS
—	Ghirma Woldu	Eritrea	DNS
—	Yoshitaka Iwamizu	Japan	DNS
—	Luis Alberto Miguel	Spain	DNS
—	Julius Gidabuday	Tanzania	DNS

==== Teams ====
Rank	Team	Points
1st place, gold medalist(s)	Ethiopia: Kenenisa Bekele / 1; Gebre-egziabher Gebremariam / 2; Sileshi Sihine / 3; Yibeltal Admassu / 8; (Tibebu Yenew) / (15); (Ketema Nigusse) / (36)	14
2nd place, silver medalist(s)	Kenya: Eliud Kipchoge / 4; Charles Kamathi / 5; Wilberforce Talel / 10; John Cheruiyot Korir / 11; (Simion Tuitoek) / (27); (Richard Limo) / (32)	30
3rd place, bronze medalist(s)	Eritrea: Zersenay Tadesse / 6; Yonas Kifle / 9; Tesfayohannes Mesfen / 22; Samson Kiflemariam / 29; (Tekle Menghisteab) / (74)	66
4	Morocco: Hicham Chatt / 12; Abderrahim Goumri / 14; Saïd El Wardi / 16; Ahmed Baday / 26; (Ridouane Harroufi) / (63); (Abdellah Falil) / (DNF)	68
5	Australia: Craig Mottram / 13; Lee Troop / 21; Steve Moneghetti / 30; Brett Cartwright / 37; (Andrew Letherby) / (45); (Shane Nankervis) / (92)	101
6	Tanzania: Fabiano Joseph / 7; Stephen Rogart / 20; Daniel Andrew Sipe / 23; Musa Ninga / 68; (Faustin Baha) / (96)	118
7	Rwanda: Dieudonné Disi / 18; Jean Baptiste Simukeka / 35; Jean Bosco Ndagijimana / 49; Rachid Safari / 62; (Valens Bivahagumye) / (84)	164
8	Spain: Ricardo Serrano / 33; Eliseo Martín / 39; José Manuel Martínez / 42; Alejandro Gómez / 52; (Carles Castillejo) / (57)	166
9	France: El Hassan Lahssini / 17; Khalid Zoubaa / 38; Augusto Gomes / 54; Loïc Letellier / 59; (Quentin Jarmuszewicz) / (76); (Ahmed El Asery) / (97)	168
10	United Kingdom: Jon Brown / 19; Ben Noad / 43; Glynn Tromans / 50; Rob Whalley / 58; (Billy Farquharson) / (91); (Chris Thompson) / (98)	170
11	United States: Abdi Abdirahman / 34; Bob Kennedy / 44; Richard Brinker / 51; Dave Davis / 82; (Nolan Swanson) / (93); (Joshua Eberly) / (108)	211
12	Belgium: Tom Compernolle / 31; Rik Ceulemans / 60; Piet Desmet / 64; Hans Janssens / 69; (Krijn Van Koolwyk) / (85); (Koen van Rie) / (89)	224
13	Portugal: Fernando Silva / 47; Manuel Silva / 56; Alfredo Bráz / 61; Luís Feiteira / 70; (Ricardo Ribas) / (105); (Delfim Conceição) / (DNF)	234
14	Botswana: Boiphemelo Selagaboy / 48; Kaelo Mosalagae / 53; Gabalebe Moloko / 71; Keenetse Moswasi / 77; (Tiyapo Maso) / (87)	249
15	Japan: Makoto Otsu / 40; Yu Mitsuya / 73; Kenta Oshima / 78; Masayuki Obata / 86	277
16	Zambia: Obed Mutanya / 55; Joseph Simuchimba / 66; Vincent Hatuleke / 94; Mcmillan Mwansa / 109	324
17	Ireland: Mark Kenneally / 72; Peter Matthews / 75; Vinny Mulvey / 83; Dermot Donnelly / 102; (Killian Lonergan) / (106)	332
18	Canada: Joël Bourgeois / 67; Matt Johnston / 81; Jeremy Deere / 107; Steve Osadiuk / 110; (Taylor Murphy) / (111); (Michael Booth) / (127)	365
19	China: Han Gang / 80; Chen Mingfu / 101; Yang Weize / 122; Deng Haiyang / 123	426
DNF	Ecuador: (Richard Arias) / (99); (Cesar Pilaluisa) / (100); (Edgar Chancusig) / (104); (Byron Piedra) / (DNF)	DNF

- Note: Athletes in parentheses did not score for the team result

== Participation ==
According to an unofficial count, 136 athletes from 48 countries participated in the Senior men's race. The announced athletes from Burundi did not show.

- Australia (6)
- Azerbaijan (1)
- Belgium (6)
- Bolivia (1)
- Botswana (5)
- Brazil (1)
- Canada (6)
- Central African Republic (1)
- Chile (1)
- China (4)
- Czech Republic (1)
- Ecuador (4)
- Equatorial Guinea (1)
- Eritrea (5)
- Ethiopia (6)
- France (6)
- Guatemala (1)
- Hong Kong (1)
- Ireland (5)
- Italy (1)
- Japan (4)
- Kazakhstan (1)
- Kenya (6)
- Kyrgyzstan (1)
- Lebanon (1)
- Macau (1)
- Malawi (1)
- Mexico (1)
- Morocco (6)
- Nepal (1)
- Netherlands (1)
- New Zealand (1)
- Palestine (1)
- Portugal (6)
- Puerto Rico (2)
- Rwanda (5)
- Spain (5)
- Tajikistan (1)
- Tanzania (5)
- Tunisia (1)
- Turkmenistan (1)
- Uganda (1)
- United Kingdom (6)
- United States (6)
- U.S. Virgin Islands (1)
- Uzbekistan (1)
- Zambia (4)
- Zimbabwe (2)

== See also ==
- 2004 IAAF World Cross Country Championships – Men's short race
- 2004 IAAF World Cross Country Championships – Junior men's race
- 2004 IAAF World Cross Country Championships – Senior women's race
- 2004 IAAF World Cross Country Championships – Women's short race
- 2004 IAAF World Cross Country Championships – Junior women's race
