= 2004 IAAF World Cross Country Championships – Junior women's race =

Junior women's race at the 2004 IAAF World Cross Country Championships
- Organisers: IAAF
- Edition: 32nd
- Date: March 20
- Host city: Brussels, Belgium
- Venue: Ossegem Park
- Events: 1
- Distances: 6 km – Junior women
- Participation: 115 athletes from 35 nations

The Junior women's race at the 2004 IAAF World Cross Country Championships was held at the Ossegem Park in Brussels, Belgium, on March 20, 2004. Reports on the event were given in The New York Times, and for the IAAF.

Complete results for individuals, for teams, medallists, and the results of British athletes who took part were published.

== Race results ==
=== Junior women's race (6 km) ===
==== Individual ====
Rank	Athlete	Country	Time
1st place, gold medalist(s)	Meselech Melkamu	Ethiopia	20:48
2nd place, silver medalist(s)	Aziza Aliyu	Ethiopia	20:53
3rd place, bronze medalist(s)	Mestawat Tadesse	Ethiopia	20:56
4	Workitu Ayanu	Ethiopia	20:59
5	Chemutai Rionotukei	Kenya	21:04
6	Jebichi Yator	Kenya	21:05
7	Yenealem Ayano	Ethiopia	21:05
8	Bao Guiying	China	21:05
9	Gladys Chemweno	Kenya	21:13
10	Hitomi Miyai	Japan	21:15
11	Yuko Nohara	Japan	21:19
12	Siham Hilali	Morocco	21:31
13	Farida Makula	Tanzania	21:32
14	Zhu Yanmei	China	21:38
15	Hirut Mengestu	Ethiopia	21:39
16	Everline Kemunto Kimwei	Kenya	21:41
17	Emmy Chepkirui	Kenya	21:42
18	Nelly Chepkurui	Kenya	21:44
19	Hitomi Niiya	Japan	21:47
20	Sophie James	France	21:47
21	Marta Romo	Spain	21:52
22	Safa Aissaoui	Tunisia	21:56
23	Olga Minina	Belarus	21:57
24	Amber Harper	United States	21:58
25	Angeline Nyiransabimana	Rwanda	21:58
26	Carrie Hawitt	United Kingdom	22:00
27	Kei Terada	Japan	22:02
28	Christine Kalmer	South Africa	22:06
29	Tomoka Inadomi	Japan	22:07
30	Alison Costello	United States	22:10
31	Amanda Trotter	United States	22:11
32	Viktoriya Kharitonova	Russia	22:12
33	Misaki Katsumata	Japan	22:16
34	Viktoriya Ivanova	Russia	22:19
35	Jennifer Barringer	United States	22:19
36	Kathleen Trotter	United States	22:20
37	Nicolene Van Rooyen	South Africa	22:24
38	Hilarie Dusabimana	Rwanda	22:28
39	Binnaz Uslu	Turkey	22:37
40	Lucia Chandamale	Malawi	22:39
41	Olga Miroshnichenko	Russia	22:39
42	Danette Doetzel	Canada	22:40
43	Michelle Lynn Childs	Canada	22:41
44	Sarah Morgan	New Zealand	22:43
45	Lamberte Nyabamikazi	Rwanda	22:51
46	Laurane Picoche	France	22:52
47	Hélène Guet	France	22:53
48	Jiang Chengcheng	China	22:54
49	Azra Eminovic	Serbia and Montenegro	22:55
50	Virginia Riverol	Mexico	22:57
51	Pauline Niyongere	Burundi	22:57
52	Maricia Krige	South Africa	22:58
53	Galina Maksimova	Russia	22:59
54	Linda Byrne	Ireland	22:59
55	Svetlana Starikova	Russia	23:00
56	Rosie Smith	United Kingdom	23:00
57	Manel Jammali	Tunisia	23:00
58	Laila Daoud	Morocco	23:03
59	Biljana Jovic	Serbia and Montenegro	23:04
60	Asmae Ghizlane	Morocco	23:04
61	Victoria Webster	United Kingdom	23:04
62	Brittany Brockman	United States	23:04
63	Holly van Gestel	Canada	23:06
64	Maica Rodríguez	Spain	23:08
65	Frances Nic Reamoinn	Ireland	23:09
66	Amal Dafire	Morocco	23:09
67	Halima Rhoulila	Morocco	23:11
68	Este de Jager	South Africa	23:12
69	Danielle Barnes	United Kingdom	23:14
70	Marieken Verhaeghe	Belgium	23:15
71	Susan Kuijken	Netherlands	23:16
72	Teresa Urbina	Spain	23:17
73	Mandy McBean	Canada	23:23
74	Selien de Schryder	Belgium	23:24
75	Tarah McKay	Canada	23:25
76	Tereza Master	Malawi	23:25
77	Christel Arnold	South Africa	23:25
78	Farida Gusi	Tanzania	23:26
79	Elsa Medhanie	Eritrea	23:28
80	Yousra Jemmali	Tunisia	23:28
81	Olga Rezkaya	Belarus	23:29
82	Lesley van Miert	Netherlands	23:32
83	Katrina Wootton	United Kingdom	23:33
84	Ayda Regragui	Morocco	23:33
85	Monica Gutierrez	Spain	23:33
86	Liliani Mendez	Puerto Rico	23:35
87	Naoile Khattou	France	23:38
88	Claire Holme	United Kingdom	23:39
89	Amira Benamor	Tunisia	23:42
90	Estelle Oberson	Switzerland	23:43
91	Michele das Chaças	Brazil	23:48
92	Juliette Benedicto	France	23:49
93	Nuria Puig	Spain	23:53
94	Irina Padabed	Belarus	23:55
95	Lucie Krízová	Czech Republic	24:02
96	Sandrine Niyoyita	Rwanda	24:07
97	Sandra Schenkel	Belgium	24:13
98	Godelive Nyirakimuzanye	Rwanda	24:17
99	Zhang Yingjie	China	24:19
100	Anne Sophie Marechal	Belgium	24:19
101	Katsiaryna Shaban	Belarus	24:21
102	Lieselot Matthys	Belgium	24:22
103	Elena García	Spain	24:23
104	Eunice Tavares	Portugal	24:24
105	Ingrid van Peteghem	Belgium	24:36
106	Beverly Ramos	Puerto Rico	25:02
107	Krishnawori Sintakalan	Nepal	25:03
108	Dana Hastie	New Zealand	25:26
109	Irina Moroz	Uzbekistan	25:38
110	Tamaris Rivera	Puerto Rico	26:28
111	Doraly Román	Puerto Rico	27:47
112	Elnara Kurbanova	Turkmenistan	30:46
—	Wisam Al-Bekheet	Palestine	DNF
—	Anesie Kwizera	Burundi	DNF
—	Marelise Retief	South Africa	DNF
—	Alyson Kohlmeier	Canada	DNS
—	Ledwin Mushanagwenzi	Zimbabwe	DNS

==== Teams ====
Rank	Team	Points
1st place, gold medalist(s)	Ethiopia: Meselech Melkamu / 1; Aziza Aliyu / 2; Mestawat Tadesse / 3; Workitu Ayanu / 4; (Yenealem Ayano) / (7); (Hirut Mengestu) / (15)	10
2nd place, silver medalist(s)	Kenya: Chemutai Rionotukei / 5; Jebichi Yator / 6; Gladys Chemweno / 9; Everline Kemunto Kimwei / 16; (Emmy Chepkirui) / (17); (Nelly Chepkurui) / (18)	36
3rd place, bronze medalist(s)	Japan: Hitomi Miyai / 10; Yuko Nohara / 11; Hitomi Niiya / 19; Kei Terada / 27; (Tomoka Inadomi) / (29); (Misaki Katsumata) / (33)	67
4	United States: Amber Harper / 24; Alison Costello / 30; Amanda Trotter / 31; Jennifer Barringer / 35; (Kathleen Trotter) / (36); (Brittany Brockman) / (62)	120
5	Russia: Viktoriya Kharitonova / 32; Viktoriya Ivanova / 34; Olga Miroshnichenko / 41; Galina Maksimova / 53; (Svetlana Starikova) / (55)	160
6	China: Bao Guiying / 8; Zhu Yanmei / 14; Jiang Chengcheng / 48; Zhang Yingjie / 99	169
7	South Africa: Christine Kalmer / 28; Nicolene Van Rooyen / 37; Maricia Krige / 52; Este de Jager / 68; (Christel Arnold) / (77); (Marelise Retief) / (DNF)	185
8	Morocco: Siham Hilali / 12; Laila Daoud / 58; Asmae Ghizlane / 60; Amal Dafire / 66; (Halima Rhoulila) / (67); (Ayda Regragui) / (84)	196
9	France: Sophie James / 20; Laurane Picoche / 46; Hélène Guet / 47; Naoile Khattou / 87; (Juliette Benedicto) / (92)	200
10	Rwanda: Angeline Nyiransabimana / 25; Hilarie Dusabimana / 38; Lamberte Nyabamikazi / 45; Sandrine Niyoyita / 96; (Godelive Nyirakimuzanye) / (98)	204
11	United Kingdom: Carrie Hawitt / 26; Rosie Smith / 56; Victoria Webster / 61; Danielle Barnes / 69; (Katrina Wootton) / (83); (Claire Holme) / (88)	212
12	Canada: Danette Doetzel / 42; Michelle Lynn Childs / 43; Holly van Gestel / 63; Mandy McBean / 73; (Tarah McKay) / (75)	221
13	Spain: Marta Romo / 21; Maica Rodríguez / 64; Teresa Urbina / 72; Monica Gutierrez / 85; (Nuria Puig) / (93); (Elena García) / (103)	242
14	Tunisia: Safa Aissaoui / 22; Manel Jammali / 57; Yousra Jemmali / 80; Amira Benamor / 89	248
15	Belarus: Olga Minina / 23; Olga Rezkaya / 81; Irina Padabed / 94; Katsiaryna Shaban / 101	299
16	Belgium: Marieken Verhaeghe / 70; Selien de Schryder / 74; Sandra Schenkel / 97; Anne Sophie Marechal / 100; (Lieselot Matthys) / (102); (Ingrid van Peteghem) / (105)	341
17	Puerto Rico: Liliani Mendez / 86; Beverly Ramos / 106; Tamaris Rivera / 110; Doraly Román / 111	413

- Note: Athletes in parentheses did not score for the team result

== Participation ==
According to an unofficial count, 115 athletes from 35 countries participated in the Junior women's race. This is in agreement with the official numbers as published. The announced athlete from Zimbabwe did not show.

- Belarus (4)
- Belgium (6)
- Brazil (1)
- Burundi (2)
- Canada (5)
- China (4)
- Czech Republic (1)
- Eritrea (1)
- Ethiopia (6)
- France (5)
- Ireland (2)
- Japan (6)
- Kenya (6)
- Malawi (2)
- Mexico (1)
- Morocco (6)
- Nepal (1)
- Netherlands (2)
- New Zealand (2)
- Palestine (1)
- Portugal (1)
- Puerto Rico (4)
- Russia (5)
- Rwanda (5)
- Serbia and Montenegro (2)
- South Africa (6)
- Spain (6)
- Switzerland (1)
- Tanzania (2)
- Tunisia (4)
- Turkey (1)
- Turkmenistan (1)
- United Kingdom (6)
- United States (6)
- Uzbekistan (1)

== See also ==
- 2004 IAAF World Cross Country Championships – Senior men's race
- 2004 IAAF World Cross Country Championships – Men's short race
- 2004 IAAF World Cross Country Championships – Junior men's race
- 2004 IAAF World Cross Country Championships – Senior women's race
- 2004 IAAF World Cross Country Championships – Women's short race
