= Athletics at the 2006 Commonwealth Games – Women's 10,000 metres =

Women's 10,000 metres at the Commonwealth Games

The women's 10,000 metres event at the 2006 Commonwealth Games was held on March 21.

== Results ==
Rank	Name	Nationality	Time	Notes
1st place, gold medalist(s)	Lucy Wangui	Kenya	31:29.66	
2nd place, silver medalist(s)	Evelyne Nganga	Kenya	31:30.86	
3rd place, bronze medalist(s)	Mara Yamauchi	England	31:49.40	PB
4	Benita Johnson	Australia	31:58.08	
5	Anna Thompson	Australia	32:27.74	PB
6	Hayley Yelling	England	32:32.38	
7	Kathy Butler	Scotland	32:44.29	
8	Tara Quinn	Canada	33:15.50	
9	Catherine Dugdale	Wales	34:09.85	PB
10	Collette Fagan	Scotland	34:35.16	
