= 2004 African Championships in Athletics – Men's 10,000 metres =

The men's 10,000 metres event at the 2004 African Championships in Athletics was held in Brazzaville, Republic of the Congo on July 15.

== Results ==
Rank	Name	Nationality	Time	Notes
1st place, gold medalist(s)	Charles Kamathi	Kenya	28:07.83	
2nd place, silver medalist(s)	Abebe Dinkesa	Ethiopia	28:10.49	
3rd place, bronze medalist(s)	Yibeltal Admassu	Ethiopia	28:28.69	
4	Dieudonné Disi	Rwanda	28:39.26	
5	Francis Kiprop	Kenya	28:51.65	
6	Venant Nyabenda	Burundi	29:47.90	
7	Audace Niyongabo	Burundi	30:14.39	
8	Willem Rooi	Namibia	30:37.69	
9	Joaquim Francisco Chamane	Angola	31:13.06	
	Ahmed Baday	Morocco	DNF	
	Ilunga Mande Zatara	Democratic Republic of the Congo	DNF	
