= Meskerem Legesse =

Ethiopian runner

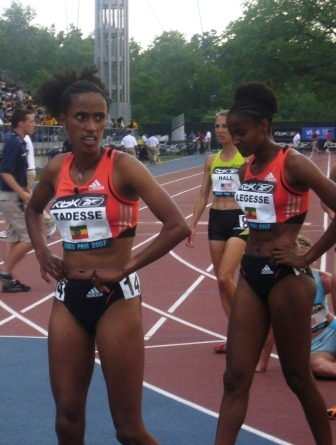
- Mestawat Tadesse and Meskerem Legesse at the 2007 Reebok Grand Prix NYC

Personal information
- Nationality: Ethiopian
- Born: 28 September 1986 Ethiopia
- Died: 15 July 2013 (aged 26) Hamden, Connecticut, United States

Sport
- Sport: Track and field

Achievements and titles
- Personal best(s): 800m indoor: 2:01.03 (Fayetteville 2004) 1500 m: 4:03.96 s (Eugene, 2003); Mile: 4:42.77 s (Colts Neck, 2006) Half Marathon: 1:15:51 (Carslbad 2009, 3rd place)

Meskerem Legesse (28 September 1986 – 15 July 2013) was an Ethiopian distance runner. She participated in the 1,500 meters at the 2004 Summer Olympics in Athens. Legesse turned professional and participated in a number of U.S. events at various distances.

She set the world junior record in the indoor 800m with a time of 2:01.03 at Fayetteville, United States on 14 February 2004. At the 2004 Olympics, she ran a time of 4:18:03 (twelfth place in a first-round heat), and did not advance to the medal round.

Legesse resided in Westport, Connecticut and had not been in Ethiopia for nine years, since 2004. She retired from running due to a heart condition.

Legesse died suddenly three weeks before she was to give birth. She was with her two-year-old son when she collapsed on 15 July 2013 at a restaurant in Hamden, Connecticut. Doctors were successful in saving her unborn child.
