= Eliud Kirui =

Kenyan long-distance runner (born 1975)

Eliud Kibet Kirui (born 15 August 1975) is a Kenyan long-distance runner.

At the 2004 World Cross Country Championships, he finished sixth in the short race, while the Kenyan team, of which Kirui was a part, won the bronze medal in the team competition.

== Personal bests ==
- 3000 metres - 7:53.41 min (2002)
- 3000 metres steeplechase - 8:17.62 min (2004)
