= Benita Willis =

Australian long-distance runner

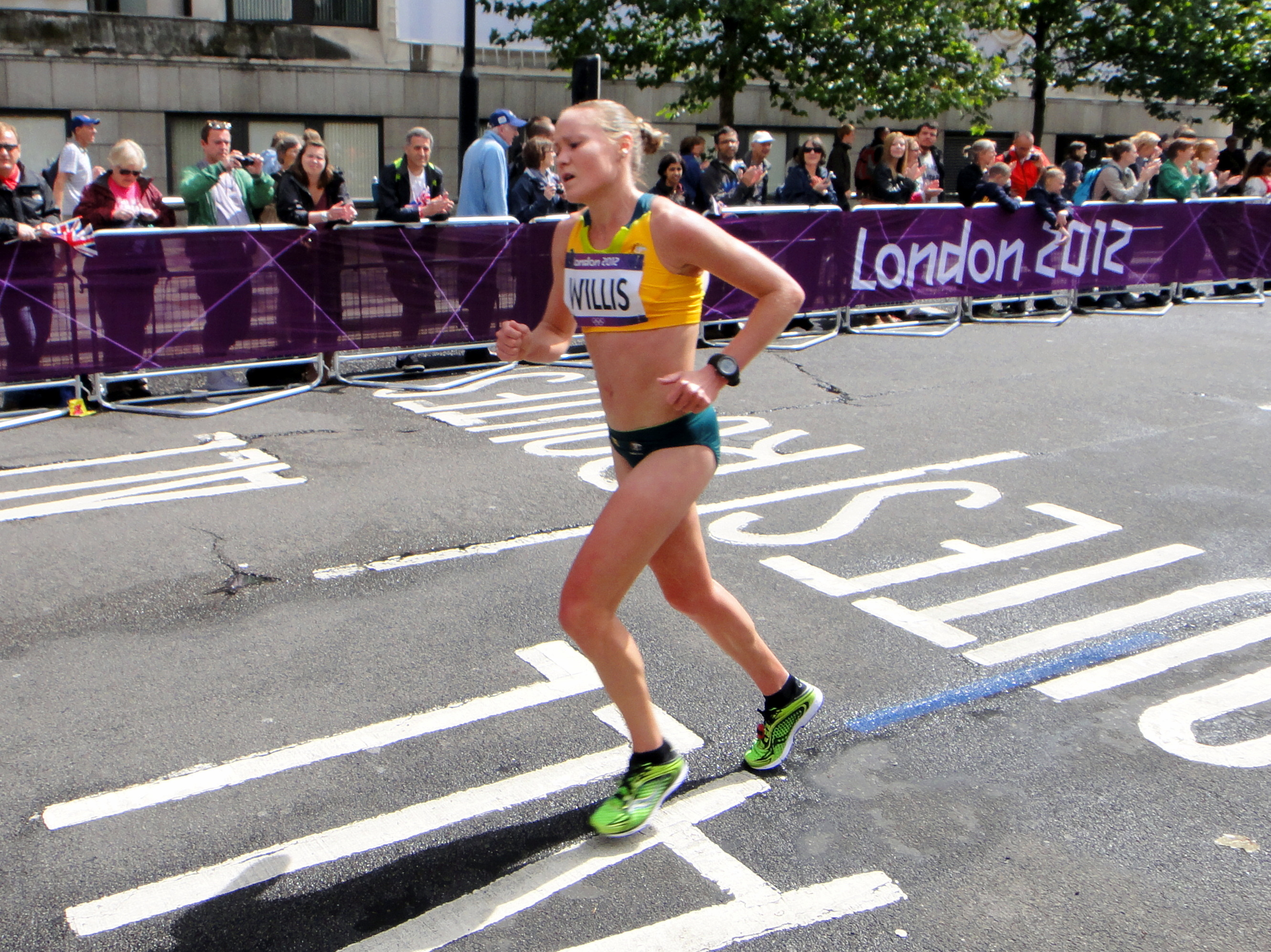
- London 2012 Olympics

Personal information
- Born: Benita Jaye Willis; 6 May 1979 (age 47) Mackay, Queensland, Australia
- Height: 1.66 m (5 ft 5 1/2 in)
- Weight: 50 kg (110 lb)

Sport
- Country: Australia
- Sport: Athletics
- Event: Marathon
Medal record
World Cross Country Championships
Gold medal – first place	2004 Brussels	Long race
World Half Marathon Championships
Bronze medal – third place	2003 Vilamoura	Half marathon

Benita Jaye Willis (born 6 May 1979 in Mackay, Queensland) is an Australian long-distance runner, who is a three-time national champion in the women's 5,000 metres. Her foremost achievement is a gold medal in the long race at the 2004 IAAF World Cross Country Championships. She has also won team medals at that competition on two occasions. She has competed at the Summer Olympics four times (2000, 2004, 2008, 2012) and has twice represented Australia at the Commonwealth Games (2002, 2006).

At the 2003 IAAF World Half Marathon Championships she won the bronze medal with a time of 1:09:26 hours. In 2004, she won the 8K at the 2004 IAAF World Cross Country Championships and also the women's half marathon title at the Great North Run. She was 24th in the 10,000 metres at the 2004 Olympic Games. At the 2006 IAAF World Cross Country Championships she won her second career medal at the event by coming fourth in the short race and helping the Australian women to the team bronze medal. She set a time of 2:22:36 at the 2006 Chicago Marathon, a new Australian national record and an Oceania area record. She won the Berlin Half Marathon in 2007 in a personal best time of 1:08.28 hours. Her third international cross country medal came at the 2008 IAAF World Cross Country Championships as she finished eleventh in the long race to lead Australia to third on the team podium.

She finished third at the 2010 Great Ireland Run, recording a time of 34:28. In spite of a break of over three years without competing over the distance, she was the runner-up at the 2012 Houston Marathon with a time 2:28:24 hours (within the Olympic qualifying standard).

Willis was a training partner of Australian distance star Craig Mottram.

== Achievements ==
Year	Competition	Venue	Position	Event	Notes
Representing Australia
1998	World Junior Championships	Annecy, France	7th	1500m	4:16.75
2000	Olympic Games	Sydney, Australia	6th (heats)	5000 m	15:21:37 min
2001	World Indoor Championships	Lisbon, Portugal	6th	3000 m	8:42.75 min
2001	World Championships	Edmonton, Canada	12th	5000 m	15:36.75 min
2001	Goodwill Games	Brisbane, Australia	4th	5000 m	15:22.31 min
2002	Commonwealth Games	Manchester, United Kingdom	7th (heats)	1500 m	4:24.43 min
2002	Commonwealth Games	Manchester, United Kingdom	6th	5000 m	15:26.55 min
2002	IAAF World Cup	Madrid, Spain	4th	5000 m	15:20.83 min
2003	World Indoor Championships	Birmingham, England	7th	3000 m	8:51.62 min
2003	World Championships	Paris, France	8th	10,000 m	30:37.68 min
2003	World Half Marathon Championships	Vilamoura, Portugal	3rd	Half marathon	1:09:26
2004	World Cross Country Championships	Brussels, Belgium	1st	Long race (8 km)	27:17
2004	Olympic Games	Athens, Greece	24th	10,000 m	32:32.01 min
2005	World Championships	Helsinki, Finland	19th	10,000 m	31:55.15 min
2006	World Cross Country Championships	Fukuoka, Japan	4th	Short race (4 km)	12:55
2006	World Cross Country Championships	Fukuoka, Japan	3rd	Short team race	69 pts
2006	Commonwealth Games	Melbourne, Australia	4th	10,000 m	31:58.08 min
2007	World Championships	Osaka, Japan	17th	10,000 m	32:55.94 min
2008	World Cross Country Championships	Edinburgh, Scotland	11th	Long race (7.905 km)	25:56
2008	World Cross Country Championships	Edinburgh, Scotland	3rd	Long team race	84 pts
2008	Olympic Games	Beijing, PR China	21st	Marathon	2:32:06
2012	Olympic Games	London, England	100th	Marathon	2:49:38

=== Circuit wins ===
Cross country

- Chiba International Cross Country: 2002, 2003, 2004
- Cross de San Sebastián: 2005
- Cross Zornotza: 2005
- Cinque Mulini: 2005
- Lidingöloppet 10K: 2009

Road

- San Silvestre Vallecana: 2004
- Great North Run: 2004
- Great South Run: 2004 (First Australian to win)
- Freihofer's Run for Women: 2006, 2007, 2008
- Berlin Half Marathon: 2007
- Great Yorkshire Run: 2007
- Great Edinburgh Run: 2008

== Recognition ==
In 2018, inducted into Australia Hall of Fame. Inaugural inductee to University of Canberra Sport Walk of Fame in 2022.
