= Mulugeta Wendimu =

Ethiopian athlete

Mulugeta Wendimu Genbere (Amharic: ሙሉጌታ ወንድሙ; born 7 January 1985, in Addis Ababa) is an Ethiopian middle- and long-distance runner.

He finished third over 3000 metres at the 2004 IAAF World Athletics Final. He also competed at the Olympic Games in Athens that year, finishing tenth in the 1500 metres competition. He reached the semi-finals of the event at the 2008 Summer Olympics.

Among other competitions, he was fifth in the junior race at the 2004 IAAF World Cross Country Championships and ran in the 1500 m heats at the 2005 World Championships in Athletics. He won the half marathon race at the Marrakesh Marathon in January 2011, finishing in a time of 1:02:00.

His personal best time over 1500 m is 3:31.13 minutes, an Ethiopian record achieved in July 2004 at the KBC Night of Athletics, and his personal best time over 5000 m is 12:57.05 minutes.
