= Zouhair El-Ouardi =

Moroccan middle-distance runner

Personal information
- Nationality: Moroccan
- Born: 15 February 1977 (age 49)

Sport
- Sport: Middle-distance running
- Event: Steeplechase

Zouhair El-Ouardi (born 15 February 1977) is a Moroccan middle-distance runner. He competed in the men's 3000 metres steeplechase at the 2004 Summer Olympics.
