= Terefe Maregu =

Ethiopian long-distance runner

Medal record

Men's athletics

Representing Ethiopia

African Championships
Gold medal – first place	2004 Brazzaville	5000 m

Terefe Maregu Zewdie (born 1982 in Gojjam), also known as Dereje Maregu and Zwedo Maregu, is an Ethiopian runner who specializes in the 5000 metres. His personal best time is 13:06.39 minutes, achieved in July 2004 in Rome.

His breakthrough year came in 2004: he took the individual bronze medal and team gold in the short race at the 2004 IAAF World Cross Country Championships and then went on to take the 5000 m title at the 2004 African Championships in Athletics. He won the Cross Internacional de Itálica in 2005 and went on to win team gold at the IAAF World Cross Country Championships that year. Tarefe won the Carlsbad 5000 in 2008, beating Mo Farah to the finish line. He also won the Boilermaker Road Race that year. He set a half marathon best of 1:01:14 in late 2009 with a third-place finish behind Haile Gebrselassie at the Oporto Half Marathon.

In 2010, he also took third at the Berlin Half Marathon, running 1:00:24 in wet conditions. He finished in third place at the BIG 25 race (also in Berlin) in May that year, running a time of 1:13:16. He made his marathon debut in October at the Frankfurt Marathon and he completed the race with a sub-2:10 run, securing sixth place in 2:09:03. He was also sixth at the Seoul International Marathon in March 2011, but was much slower (2:15:15) in that race.

== Achievements ==
Year	Competition	Venue	Position	Notes
2004	World Cross Country Championships	Brussels, Belgium	3rd	Short race
2004	World Cross Country Championships	Brussels, Belgium	1st	Team competition
2004	African Championships	Brazzaville, Congo	1st	5000 m
2005	World Cross Country Championships	Saint-Galmier, France	6th	Short race
2005	World Cross Country Championships	Saint-Galmier, France	1st	Team competition
