= Chris Winter (athlete) =

Canadian steeplechase runner (born 1986)

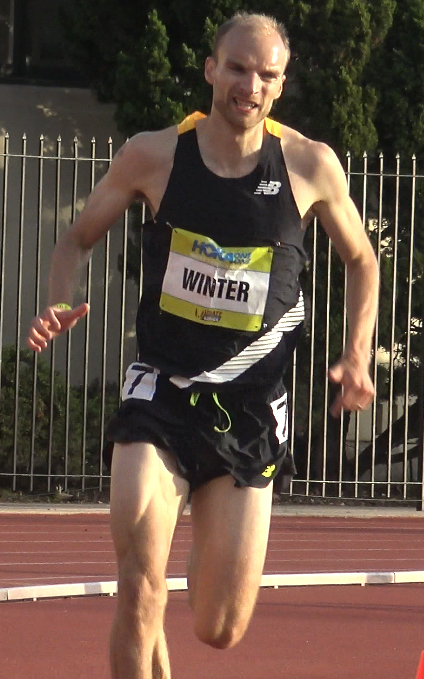
- Chris Winter at the 2016 Hoka One One in 2016

Personal information
- Born: July 22, 1986 (age 39) North Vancouver, British Columbia
- Education: University of Oregon
- Height: 188 cm (6 ft 2 in)
- Weight: 75 kg (165 lb)

Sport
- Country: Canada
- Sport: Athletics
- Event: Middle distance
- Coached by: Dave Scott-Thomas
- Retired: August 2016
- Personal best: 3,000 steeplechase = 8:26.55

Chris Winter (born July 22, 1986 in North Vancouver, British Columbia) is a Canadian track and field athlete competing in the middle-distance events, predominantly the 3,000m steeplechase.

In July 2016 he was officially named to Canada's Olympic team.
