= Yibeltal Admassu =

Ethiopian long-distance runner

Medal record

Men's athletics

Representing Ethiopia

African Championships
Bronze medal – third place	2004 Brazzaville	10,000 m

Yibeltal Admassu (born 1980) is an Ethiopian runner who specializes in the 10,000 metres and cross-country running. He has not competed on top level since 2004.

== Achievements ==
Year	Competition	Venue	Position	Event	Notes
Representing Ethiopia
2001	World Championships	Edmonton, Canada	4th	10,000 m	
2004	World Cross Country Championships	Brussels, Belgium	8th	Long race	
2004	World Cross Country Championships	Brussels, Belgium	1st	Team	
2004	African Championships	Brazzaville, Republic of the Congo	3rd	10,000 m	

=== Personal bests ===
- 5000 metres – 13:11.34 min (2004)
- 10,000 metres – 27:41.82 min (2004)
