= Ian Burrell =

American long-distance runner

Personal information
- Born: February 15, 1985 (age 41)

Sport
- Country: United States
- Sport: Track and field
- Event: Marathon

Ian Burrell (born February 15, 1985) is an American long-distance runner who specialises in the marathon. He finished in 25th place in the marathon event at the 2015 World Championships in Athletics in Beijing, China.

Burrell competed for the Georgia Bulldogs track and field team in the NCAA.
