= Ronald Rutto =

Kenyan long-distance runner

Ronald Kipchumba Rutto (born 8 October 1987 in Marakwet) is a Kenyan long-distance runner.

== Biography ==
Rutto initially began his career in athletics as a steeplechaser. He won the gold medal in the 2000 m steeplechase at the IAAF World Youth Championships and set a world youth best time of 5:30.27, overhauling Soviet runner Mykola Matyushenko's record which had stood unbettered for almost two decades. Rutto demonstrated his ability further with another record run of 5:27.64 in the event two months later in Liège. He ran in the junior race at the 2004 IAAF World Cross Country Championships and finished in seventh place, forming part of the winning Kenyan junior team. He returned to steeplechasing on the track later that season and built upon his youth title with a win at the 2004 World Junior Championships in Athletics, where he achieved a personal best of 8:23.32 for the 3000 m steeplechase. He defeated Musa Amer Obaid with a sprint to the line to continue Kenya's undefeated streak in the competition.

Rutto was third in the steeplechase at the 2005 Qatar Athletic Super Grand Prix and went on to beat Tariku Bekele at the Oeiras International Cross Country later that year, taking his first win on the senior cross country circuit. He returned to the Oeiras meet in 2006 but managed only eighth place. He continued running in the steeplechase, and also in the 3000 metres flat, over the next four years but he saw little improvement upon the times set during his junior career. His senior career had effectively stalled.

After missing the 2009 season, he re-emerged as a road running athlete and made his marathon debut in October 2010 at the Frankfurt Marathon. The change of event proved a good one, as he finished in seventh place in a time of 2:09:17, just ahead of Elijah Keitanywho was runner-up at the Amsterdam Marathon the previous year. He failed a drugs test for erythropoietin (EPO) in 2012 and was banned for two years.
