= Kathy Butler =

British long-distance runner and coach

Personal information
- Born: 22 October 1973 (age 53) Edinburgh, Scotland
- Height: 174 cm (5 ft 9 in)
- Weight: 54 kg (119 lb)
- Website: kathy-butler.com

Sport
- Sport: Athletics
- Event: Middle-distance running
- University team: University of Wisconsin
- Club: Windsor, Slough, Eton and Hounslow Athletic Club
Medal record
Women's athletics
Representing United Kingdom
World Cross Country Championships
Bronze medal – third place	2004 Brussels	Women's team
European Cup
Gold medal – first place	2001 Bremen	3000 m
Goodwill Games
Bronze medal – third place	2001 Brisbane	5000 m

Kathy Butler (born 22 October 1973) is a Scottish-born long-distance runner who competed in the 10,000 metres and marathon events, as well as cross country running and road running. She has competed internationally for Great Britain, Scotland and Canada.

== Early life and collegiate career ==
Butler was born in Edinburgh to English parents and was brought up in Edinburgh and the Isle of Wight until her parents emigrated to Ontario, Canada when she was ten years old. She attended the University of Guelph before transferring to the University of Wisconsin. In 2004, she was inducted into the University of Wisconsin Hall of Fame. In 2005, she was inducted into the University of Guelph Hall of Fame.

As a member of the cross country and track teams at the University of Wisconsin, Butler was a five-time NCAA Champion and a 13-time All-American. In the 1995-96 season, Butler received the Honda Sports Award, given to the top women in collegiate athletics.

== Canada ==
While in college she competed for Canada in the 5,000 metres at the 1996 Olympic Games in Atlanta. She finished seventh in her heat and did not advance to the final.

In 1999 Butler was 4th at the World Cross Country short course held in Belfast, Northern Ireland. 1999 IAAF World Cross Country Championships.

The failure to receive any support from Athletics Canada resulted in questions being asked in the Canadian Parliament.

== Great Britain ==
In 2000, she switched to competing internationally for Great Britain.

Butler finished third behind Jo Pavey in the 5,000 metres event at the 2001 AAA Championships. Also in 2001, Butler finished 12th at the World Cross Country Championships (4 k race), won the European Cup 3000m and also placed third in the 5,000 metres at the Goodwill Games in Brisbane, Queensland, Australia.

During the IAAF World Championships Olga Yegorova, who had shown positive for the blood-boosting agent erythropoietin in tests conducted by a Paris lab escaped suspension because procedures were improperly observed, her presence at the World Championships kept Butler out of the World Championship final.

In 2002 Butler missed out on competing for Scotland at the Commonwealth Games after she was diagnosed with osteitis pubis. In 2004, she finished 11th at the World Cross Country Championships (8 km race) in Brussels, winning a bronze medal with the British team. Running for Great Britain at the 2004 Olympic Games in Athens, Butler finished 12th in the 10,000 metres with a time of 31:41.13.

In 2005 Butler won the meet at the Venta de Baños Cross Country. Later in the year she debuted in the marathon with 2:30:01 at the Chicago Marathon.

Butler competed in the 10,000 metres at the 2006 Commonwealth Games, finishing 7th while representing Scotland.

Butler was twice British 10,000 metres champion after winning the British AAA Championships title in 2004 and 2005.

Butler was an assistant coach at both Stanford University and University of Wisconsin. Butler was coached for much of her post collegiate career by Peter Tegen and at the end of her career by former marathon world record holder Steve Jones.

== Personal life ==
In 1994 Butler was diagnosed with Graves' disease, a disorder of the thyroid gland.

Butler has a maple leaf tattooed on her ankle, along with the five-ring Olympic insignia.

Butler lives in Nederland, Colorado in the United States with her husband and daughter. She is the Head Coach of Run Boulder AC.

Butler is the Chair of USATF Coaching Education as well as a Level 1 and Level 2 Instructor for USATF.

== Competition record ==
=== Olympics ===
1996 Atlanta Olympics

- 5000 m (competing for Canada)

2004 Athens Olympics

- 10,000 m: 12th. 31:40 (competing for Great Britain)

=== Other events ===
- British Athletics Championships 2005 World Trials - First place (10000) 31:45
- 2004 British Olympic Trials - First place (10000 m) 31:36
- 1999 IAAF World Cross Country Championships - 4th Place (4k)
- 1997 NCAA Outdoor Track and Field Championship - First place (3000m)
- 1996 NCAA Outdoor Track and Field Championship - First place (3000m)
- 1995 NCAA Outdoor Track and Field Championship - First place (3000m)
- 1995 NCAA Cross Country Championship - First place

== Personal bests ==
- 1500 metres - 4:07.68 min (1997)
- 3000 metres - 8.40.97 min (2001)
- 5000 metres - 15:05.51 min (2004)
- 10,000 metres - 31:36.90 min (2004)
- Half marathon - 71:05 min (2006)
- Marathon - 2:28:39 min (2006)
