= Meba Tadesse =

Ethiopian long-distance runner

Meba Tadesse (born 1986) is an Ethiopian long-distance runner. At the 2003 World Cross Country Championships he finished seventh in the short race, while the Ethiopian team, of which Tadesse was a part, won the silver medal in the team competition. He won the world junior cross country title at the 2004 IAAF World Cross Country Championships. He has not competed internationally as a senior athlete. He has track bests of 7:48.18 minutes for the 3000 metres and 13:16.40 min for the 5000 metres.
