= Émilie Mondor =

Canadian long-distance runner

Personal information
- Nationality: Canadian
- Born: April 29, 1981 Mascouche, Quebec, Canada
- Died: September 9, 2006 (aged 25)

Émilie Mondor (April 29, 1981 – September 9, 2006) was a Canadian long-distance runner. She was a two-time national champion in the women's 5,000 metres.

== Early life ==
She was born in Mascouche, Quebec in 1981. Mondor studied at McGill University, later moving to Simon Fraser University to study and train. She had a promising performance at the 1998 IAAF World Cross Country Championships, finishing tenth in the junior race at the age of sixteen. She did not build on these performances, however, and she finished some minutes behind the leaders at the 1999 and 2000 world junior races.

== Career ==
Mondor won the Fukuoka International Cross Country in March 2003 with a time of 18:51 – one of the fastest recorded on the course. A twelfth-place finish at the 2003 IAAF World Cross Country Championships confirmed her one of the better cross country runners of her generation. She finished twelfth in 5000 metres at the 2003 World Championships in Athletics, and near the close of the season she became the first Canadian woman to dip under 15:00 in the 5000 m. She improved further in cross country the following year, finishing in eighth in the long race at the 2004 IAAF World Cross Country Championships and thirteenth in the short race at the same competition.

She began to take up road running and won the Vancouver Sun Run in early 2004. At the 2004 Summer Olympics she finished seventeenth overall in the 5000 m. She also won the Belfast International Cross Country that year. She was the most successful athlete in the history of the North American 5K Championships, coming runner-up in 2002, then winning three straight titles in the following years.

Mondor was unable to compete for much of 2005 and 2006 due to a rare medical condition affecting the strength of her bones. After drug treatments for the condition, she placed second in a 10 kilometre road race held in Toronto on May 7, 2006.

== Death ==
She died in a car accident on Highway 417 near Hawkesbury, Ontario. According to the Ontario Provincial Police, Ms. Mondor lost control of her car after passing two other vehicles.
