= Gebregziabher Gebremariam =

Ethiopian long-distance runner

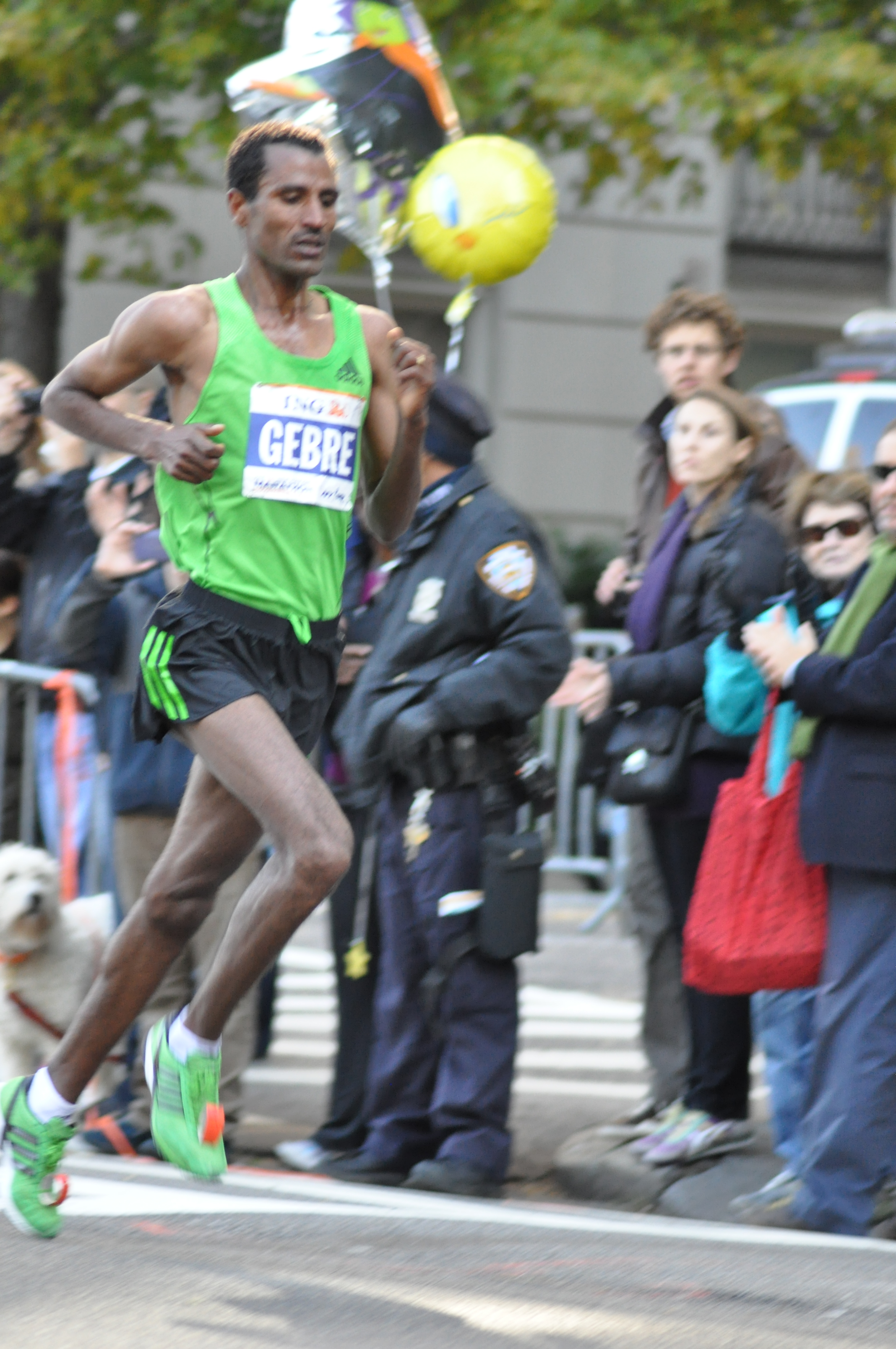
- Gebre Gebremariam at the 2011 NYC Marathon

Personal information
- Full name: Gebregziabher Gebremariam
- Nationality: Ethiopian
- Born: September 10, 1984 (age 41) Tigray, Ethiopia
- Height: 1.78 m (5 ft 10 in)
- Weight: 56 kg (123 lb; 8.8 st)

Sport
- Sport: Running
Medal record
Men's athletics
Representing Ethiopia
World Cross Country Championships
Gold medal – first place	2002 Dublin	Junior race
Gold medal – first place	2004 Brussels	Short race team
Gold medal – first place	2004 Brussels	Long race team
Gold medal – first place	2005 Saint-Etienne	Short race team
Gold medal – first place	2009 Amman	Senior race
Silver medal – second place	2002 Dublin	Junior race team
Silver medal – second place	2003 Lausanne	Long race team
Silver medal – second place	2004 Brussels	Short race
Silver medal – second place	2004 Brussels	Long race
Silver medal – second place	2008 Edinburgh	Senior race team
Silver medal – second place	2009 Amman	Senior race team
Bronze medal – third place	2003 Lausanne	Long race
Bronze medal – third place	2006 Fukuoka	Senior race team
Bronze medal – third place	2010 Bydgoszcz	Senior race team
African Championships
Gold medal – first place	2008 Addis Ababa	10,000 m

Gebregziabher Gebremariam (Amharic: ገብረግዚኣብሄር ገብረማርያም; born September 10, 1984, in Tigray) is a retired Ethiopian long-distance runner. He established himself at the IAAF World Cross Country Championships, winning the junior title in 2002 and two silver medals in the senior races in 2004. He represented Ethiopia over 5000 metres at the 2004 Summer Olympics, taking fourth place, and over 10000 metres at the 2012 Summer Olympics. He was the 2009 World Champion in cross country.

He made his marathon debut at the 2010 New York City Marathon and won the race in a time of 2:08:14. He was third at the Boston Marathon in 2011 with a personal best of 2:04:53 hours (downhill). He is married to long-distance runner Werknesh Kidane.

== Career ==
At the 2002 World Junior Championships Gebregziabher Gebremariam won the 10,000 metres and finished third in the 5000 metres race. He also won the World Junior Championships in cross country running. The following year he made his first impact on the international scene by finishing third at the 1st IAAF World Athletics Final and second at the All-Africa Games.

In March 2004 Gebremariam showed that he had fully progressed from the junior ranks by winning two silver medals at the World Cross Country Championships, one over the short course and one over the long course; in essence, were it not for his countryman Kenenisa Bekele, he would be one of only two men ever to have claimed short and long course victories at the same Championships. He was selected for the Ethiopian Summer Olympic 5000 metres team along with Kenenisa Bekele and Dejene Berhanu, where he finished fourth, 0.25 seconds behind bronze medalist Eliud Kipchoge of Kenya.

Gebremariam finished sixth in the 10,000 metres at the 2007 World Championships in Osaka. In October 2008 he made his debut in the half marathon, finishing 2nd in the 2008 Bupa Great North Run behind Tsegaye Kebede. He won gold at the 2009 IAAF World Cross Country Championships.

Gebremariam began the 2009–10 IAAF cross country season with a win at the opening meeting – the Oeiras International Cross Country, and also took victory at the Cross de Atapuerca, Cross Internacional de Soria and Cross Internacional de Alcobendas meetings. He finished tenth in the senior race at the 2010 IAAF World Cross Country Championships.

Heading out onto the summer athletics circuit, he ran a course record of 27:42 at the UAE Healthy Kidney 10K in Central Park in May, knocking six seconds off Tadese Tola's record and beating Peter Kamais to the line. He was victorious at the Peachtree Road Race in June, just pipping Peter Kirui at the finish, and then won the Beach to Beacon 10K in August. He scored his second road win of the month at the Falmouth Road Race, beating Wilson Kwambai Chebet just at the finish. Former world junior silver medallist Matthew Kisorio bested him at the Philadelphia Half Marathon, however, as the Ethiopian's time of 1:00:25 was ten seconds short of the victor.

He won the 2010 New York City Marathon on his debut over the distance with a time of 2:08:14. Among his competitors was Haile Gebrselassie, who dropped out mid-race and later announced his retirement. Gebremariam had encouraged his compatriot to stay in the race but the veteran responded "I can't, Gebre, you have to go on". He paid his respects to the world record holder after the race, saying "Haile is a good guy, he is king. I have learned so many things from him".

He entered the New York City Half Marathon the following March and was narrowly beaten at the line by Mo Farah. In April 2011, he finished third in the 2011 Boston Marathon with a time of 2:04:53 hours. This was among the fastest ever times for the marathon, but it was recorded on a downhill circuit. He ran at Boston's first B.A.A. 10K race in June and finished second behind Geoffrey Mutai, a finish which he and Mutai repeated at the Giro di Castelbuono a month later. He returned to defend his title at the 2011 New York City Marathon, but was again beaten by Mutai and ended the race in fourth place.

At the 2012 Boston Marathon he faltered in warm temperatures and ended the race in 14th place with a time of 2:22:56 hours. He qualified to represent Ethiopia at the 2012 London Olympics and finished eighth in the Olympic 10,000 metres final. He was runner-up to Mo Farah, the winner of the Olympic race, at the Rock ‘n’ Roll Mardi Gras Half Marathon in February 2013.

== Personal bests ==
Event	Time	Venue	Date
3000 m	7:39.48	New York City, USA	11 June 2005
5000 m	12:52.80	Rome, Italy	8 July 2005
10000 m	26:52.33	Hengelo, Netherlands	26 May 2007
Half marathon	1:00:25	Philadelphia, USA	19 September 2010
Marathon*	2:04:53	Boston, USA	18 April 2011
Marathon	2:08:00	New York City, USA	6 November 2011

(*) Downhill and point-to-point course

- All information taken from IAAF profile.

== Personal life ==
Gebremariam is the uncle of the professional distance runner, Biniam Mehary. Gebremariam is originally from the Tigray Region. He currently resides in Washington, DC.
