= Teyba Erkesso =

Ethiopian runner (born 1982)

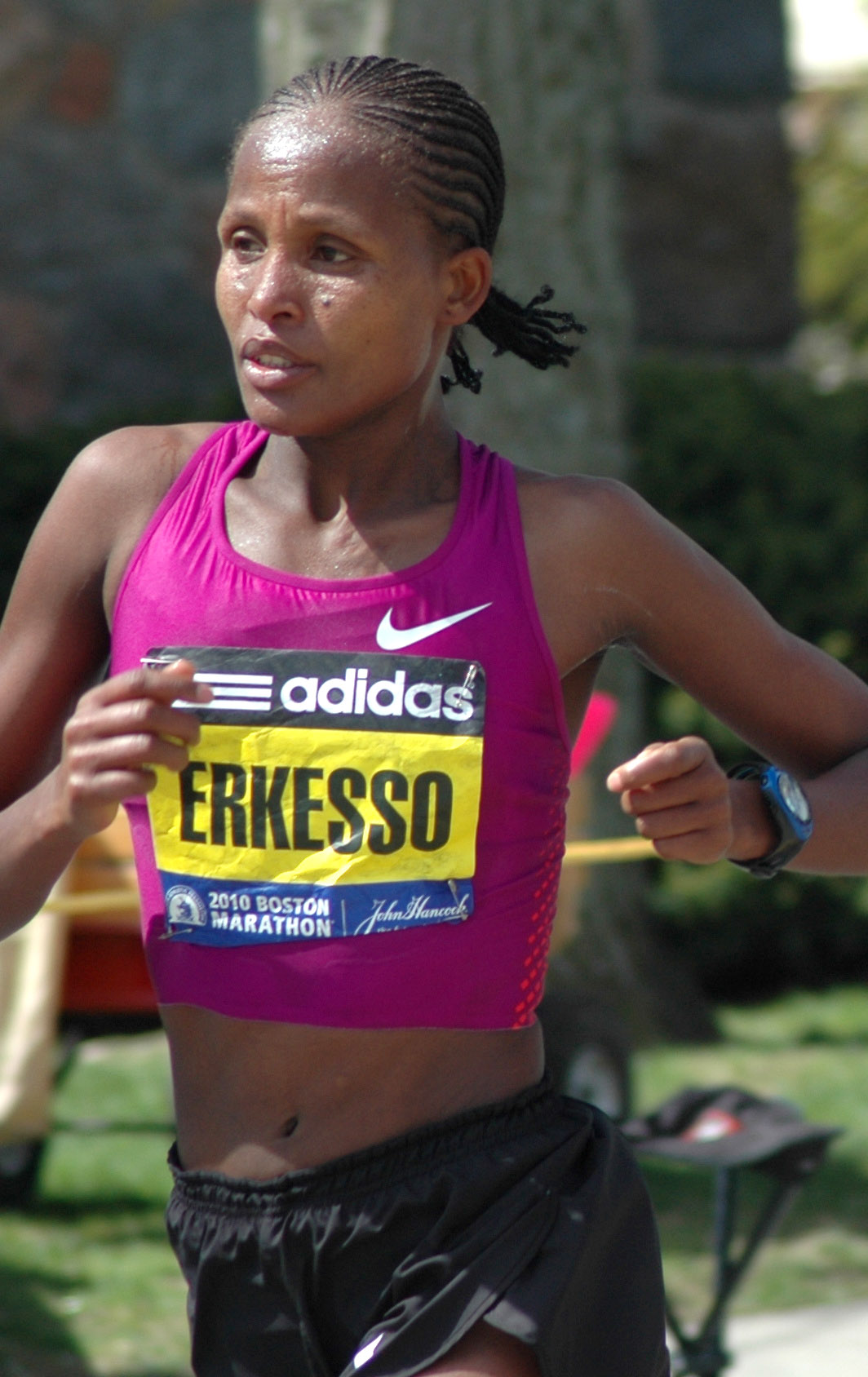
Medal record
Women's athletics
Representing the Ethiopia
World Marathon Majors
Gold medal – first place	2010 Boston	Marathon
Silver medal – second place	2009 Chicago	Marathon

Teyba Erkesso Wako (born 30 October 1982 in Arsi) is an Ethiopian runner who specializes in road running (including the half marathon and marathon) as well as cross-country running.

She began running for Ethiopia internationally at the age of sixteen and won her first gold medal at the 2002 IAAF World Cross Country Championships, helping the Ethiopian women to a team victory. She formed a key part of Ethiopian team competitions in her early career, helping them reach the podium at international events on numerous occasions. Her first individual medal came at the 2004 IAAF World Cross Country Championships, where she won the bronze medal in the short race.

It was in road running competitions where she made her name. She won the Marseille-Cassis Classique Internationale at the age of 21 but only switched her focus to road running in 2007. After a fourth-place finish at the 2009 Chicago Marathon, she set a state record of 2:23:53 at the Houston Marathon (a personal best). She won her first major events in 2010, placing first in the Ras Al Khaimah Half Marathon and then the Boston Marathon. She is perhaps known for pushing the pace during the middle of the race, as she did in Boston and Houston to break away.

== Career ==
Her first major competition representing Ethiopia was the 1999 IAAF World Half Marathon Championships, where she finished 38th overall at the age of sixteen. She improved to 20th place at the 2001 edition of the event, helping the Ethiopian women to the team bronze medal as a result. In the following year at the 2002 IAAF World Cross Country Championships she finished tenth and took the gold medal in the team competition with Ethiopia. She returned to the World Half Marathon Championships in 2003, but did not repeat her medal success, finishing in 21st place and fourth overall with the women's team. One of her first ever road racing wins was at the Marseille-Cassis Classique Internationale in 2003, where she finished the half marathon in 1:10:07.

In the 2004 season Erkesso took on both the long and short races at the 2004 IAAF World Cross Country Championships in Brussels. After finishing fifth in the long race and winning the team gold, she reached the global podium for the first time with a bronze medal in the short race and yet another team gold. She won the IAAF's Lotto Cross Cup Brussels cross country meeting twice consecutively in 2005 and 2006. She again ran in two races at the 2006 IAAF World Cross Country Championships, but was less successful on her second attempt. Although she finished twelfth and won a team gold medal in the short race, she was well off the pace in 46th position in the long race.

Erkesso was victorious at the Vancouver Sun Run 10K in 2007, and won the 2009 Bay to Breakers with a time of 38:29. That same year she just missed out on the podium at the Chicago Marathon, finishing in fourth place. She won the 2009 Houston Marathon in a state record time and improved it further with a second win in 2010, running 2:23:53. She set a new personal best at the Ras Al Khaimah Half Marathon in 2010, taking fourth place with a time of 1:07:41. She won her first World Marathon Major in April that year, winning the Boston Marathon with a time of 2:26:11. She led from the halfway point and increased her lead, just managing to hold off Tatyana Pushkareva in the final stages. In June she took part in the Freihofer's Run for Women and finished in fourth place, some distance off the winner Emily Chebet. She missed almost all of the 2011 season, with her sole appearance coming at the 2011 Boston Marathon, where she failed to finish. She also pulled out early on in her first race of 2012 at the Ottawa Marathon.

== Achievements ==
Year	Competition	Venue	Position	Event	Notes
Representing Ethiopia
1999	World Half Marathon Championships	Palermo, Italy	38th	Half marathon	
2001	World Half Marathon Championships	Bristol, United Kingdom	20th	Half marathon	
2001	World Half Marathon Championships	Bristol, United Kingdom	3rd	Team	
2002	World Cross Country Championships	Dublin, Ireland	10th	Long race	
2002	World Cross Country Championships	Dublin, Ireland	1st	Team	
2003	World Half Marathon Championships	Vilamoura, Portugal	21st	Half Marathon	
2003	World Half Marathon Championships	Vilamoura, Portugal	4th	Team	
2003	Marseille-Cassis Classique Internationale	Marseille, France	1st	Half Marathon	
2004	World Cross Country Championships	Brussels, Belgium	5th	Long race	
2004	World Cross Country Championships	Brussels, Belgium	1st	Team	
2004	World Cross Country Championships	Brussels, Belgium	3rd	Short race	
2004	World Cross Country Championships	Brussels, Belgium	1st	Team	
2004	World Half Marathon Championships	New Delhi, India	15th	Half marathon	
2004	World Half Marathon Championships	New Delhi, India	1st	Team	
2006	World Cross Country Championships	Fukuoka, Japan	12th	Short race	
2006	World Cross Country Championships	Fukuoka, Japan	1st	Team	
2006	World Cross Country Championships	Fukuoka, Japan	48th	Long race	
2006	World Road Running Championships	Debrecen, Hungary	10th	20 km	
2006	World Road Running Championships	Debrecen, Hungary	2nd	Team	
2007	All-Africa Games	Algiers, Algeria	5th	10,000 m	
2009	Houston Marathon	Houston, United States	1st	Marathon	2:24:15
2010	Houston Marathon	Houston, United States	1st	Marathon	2:23:53
2010	Boston Marathon	Boston, United States	1st	Marathon	2:26:11

== Personal bests ==
- 3000 metres - 8:56.67 min (2006)
- 5000 metres - 15:02.28 min (2004)
- 10,000 metres - 31:13.67 min (2007)
- Half marathon - 1:07:41 hrs (2010)
- Marathon - 2:23:53 hrs (2010)
