= Mestawat Tadesse =

Ethiopian middle-distance runner

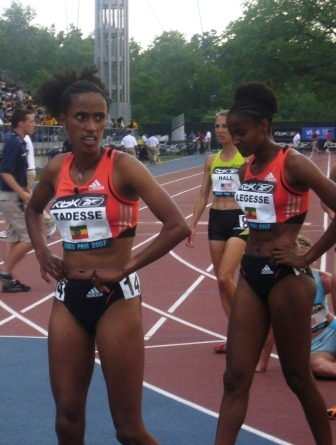
Mestawat Tadesse and Meskerem Legesse at the 2007 Reebok Grand Prix NYC

Mestawat Tadesse (born 19 July 1985) is an Ethiopian middle distance runner who specializes in the 1500 metres.

Tadesse finished fifth at the 2006 African Championships and tenth at the 2006 World Athletics Final.

== Personal bests ==
- 800 metres - 2:05.40 min (2004)
- 1500 metres - 4:04.61 min (2006)
- One mile - 4:28.51 min (2003)
- 3000 metres - 9:01.86 min (2005)
