= 2003 IAAF World Cross Country Championships – Men's short race =

Men's short race at the 2003 IAAF World Cross Country Championships
- Organisers: IAAF
- Edition: 31st
- Date: March 29, 2003
- Host city: Lausanne, Vaud, Switzerland
- Venue: L'Institut Équestre National d'Avenches
- Events: 1
- Distances: 4.03 km – Men's short
- Participation: 126 athletes from 37 nations

The Men's short race at the 2003 IAAF World Cross Country Championships was held at the L'Institut Équestre National in Avenches near Lausanne, Switzerland, on March 29, 2003. Reports of the event were given in The New York Times, in the Herald, and for the IAAF.

Complete results for individuals, for teams, medallists, and the results of British athletes who took part were published.

== Race results ==
=== Men's short race (4.03 km) ===
==== Individual ====
Rank	Athlete	Country	Time
1st place, gold medalist(s)	Kenenisa Bekele	Ethiopia	11:01
2nd place, silver medalist(s)	John Kibowen	Kenya	11:04
3rd place, bronze medalist(s)	Benjamin Limo	Kenya	11:06
4	Mike Kipyego	Kenya	11:18
5	Thomas Kiplitany	Kenya	11:20
6	Khalid El Amri	Morocco	11:22
7	Meba Tadesse	Ethiopia	11:24
8	David Kilel	Kenya	11:25
9	Smail Sghir	France	11:27
10	Abderrahim Goumri	Morocco	11:28
11	Yousef El Nasri	Spain	11:28
12	Tessema Absher	Ethiopia	11:29
13	Abiyote Endale	Ethiopia	11:31
14	Driss Maazouzi	France	11:32
15	Ahmed Baday	Morocco	11:34
16	Abdelkader Hachlaf	Morocco	11:35
17	Ketema Nigusse	Ethiopia	11:39
18	Christian Belz	Switzerland	11:39
19	Chris Thompson	United Kingdom	11:40
20	Evans Kipchumba	Kenya	11:42
21	Fethi Meftah	Algeria	11:42
22	Saïd El Wardi	Morocco	11:43
23	Azzedine Zerdoum	Algeria	11:43
24	Ali Abdalla	Eritrea	11:44
25	Kevin Sullivan	Canada	11:44
26	Luciano Di Pardo	Italy	11:45
27	Khoudir Aggoune	Algeria	11:45
28	Antonio Manuel Martínez	Spain	11:45
29	Phil Costley	New Zealand	11:46
30	Hassan Oubassour	France	11:46
31	Sandu Rebenciuc	United States	11:47
32	Umberto Pusterla	Italy	11:47
33	Viktor Röthlin	Switzerland	11:47
34	Sergio Gallardo	Spain	11:48
35	Salah Hissou	Morocco	11:48
36	Rachid Chékhémani	France	11:49
37	Dan Browne	United States	11:49
38	Boštjan Buč	Slovenia	11:50
39	Abdelhakim Maazouz	Algeria	11:51
40	Dehe Woyesha	Ethiopia	11:52
41	Adrian Blincoe	New Zealand	11:53
42	Manuel Silva	Portugal	11:54
43	Fernando Silva	Portugal	11:55
44	Rees Buck	New Zealand	11:55
45	Philipp Bandi	Switzerland	11:56
46	Joël Bourgeois	Canada	11:56
47	Steven Vernon	United Kingdom	11:57
48	Abdulhak Zakaria	Bahrain	11:58
49	Tarek Boukensa	Algeria	11:58
50	Clodoaldo da Silva	Brazil	11:59
51	Irba Lakhal	France	12:00
52	Fortunato Yaccob	Eritrea	12:00
53	Mário Teixeira	Portugal	12:01
54	Chris Davies	United Kingdom	12:01
55	Javier Carriqueo	Argentina	12:01
56	Luke Watson	United States	12:02
57	Sean Kaley	Canada	12:02
58	Jesús España	Spain	12:02
59	Karl Savage	United States	12:03
60	Dan Wilson	United States	12:04
61	Ian Connor	United States	12:04
62	Chris Bolt	United Kingdom	12:05
63	Jeremy Deere	Canada	12:05
64	José Ramos	Portugal	12:06
65	Mark Bomba	Canada	12:07
66	Stefano Scaini	Italy	12:07
67	Ahmed Abd El Mangoud	Egypt	12:08
68	Michael Aish	New Zealand	12:09
69	José Luis Blanco	Spain	12:09
70	Sivuyile Dlongwana	South Africa	12:11
71	Jonathan Monje	Chile	12:12
72	Peter Philipp	Switzerland	12:12
73	Martin McCarthy	Ireland	12:13
74	Mo Farah	United Kingdom	12:13
75	Domenico D'Ambrosio	Italy	12:13
76	Rui Silva	Portugal	12:15
77	Yonas Ogbagebriel	Eritrea	12:16
78	David Mokwana	South Africa	12:16
79	Giuliano Battocletti	Italy	12:17
80	Ridouane Es-Saadi	Belgium	12:17
81	Dermot Donnelly	Ireland	12:17
82	Igor Teteryukov	Belarus	12:18
83	Abd Al-Rasool Ahmed	Egypt	12:18
84	Angus MacLean	United Kingdom	12:19
85	Vincent Kuotane	South Africa	12:19
86	Alexander Motone	South Africa	12:20
87	Julius Achon	Uganda	12:20
88	Ruslan Sadovskiy	Belarus	12:21
89	Mandla Maseko	South Africa	12:23
90	Adel Behery	Egypt	12:24
91	Nick Willis	New Zealand	12:24
92	Sveinn Margeirsson	Iceland	12:25
93	Mohamed Khaldi	Algeria	12:26
94	Jérôme Schaffner	Switzerland	12:27
95	Aleksandr Nikolayuk	Belarus	12:28
96	Tim Clerbout	Belgium	12:28
97	Josep Sansa	Andorra	12:29
98	Stijn van den Velde	Belgium	12:29
99	Noel Berkeley	Ireland	12:30
100	Alibay Shukurov	Azerbaijan	12:32
101	Robert Connolly	Ireland	12:33
102	Aléxis Abraham	France	12:34
103	Ronny Marie	Seychelles	12:34
104	Bonaventure Niyonizigiye	Burundi	12:35
105	Michael Maechler	Switzerland	12:37
106	Luís Feiteira	Portugal	12:37
107	Víctor Martínez	Andorra	12:37
108	Gary Murray	Ireland	12:38
109	Robert Juricic	Croatia	12:38
110	Valeriy Pisarev	Kyrgyzstan	12:38
111	Sergey Berdnik	Belarus	12:39
112	Monder Rizki	Belgium	12:42
113	Denis Bagrev	Kyrgyzstan	12:43
114	Ernest Ndjissipou	Central African Republic	12:46
115	Gauti Jóhannesson	Iceland	12:48
116	Simon Labiche	Seychelles	12:52
117	Ahmed El Feky	Egypt	13:00
118	Anthony Godongwana	South Africa	13:02
119	Nigel Brunton	Ireland	13:03
120	Vasiliy Medvedev	Uzbekistan	13:04
121	Dovran Amandjayev	Turkmenistan	13:12
122	William Boehlke	U.S. Virgin Islands	13:13
123	Ivan Morozov	Uzbekistan	13:19
124	Natnael Amare	Eritrea	14:05
125	Vladimir Escajadillo	Peru	14:52
—	Alberto García	Spain	DQ^{†}
—	Abdelbeki Zaiter	Algeria	DNS
—	Nzolameso Lufua	DR Congo	DNS
—	Mbiya Makwenda	DR Congo	DNS
—	Eddy Assana	DR Congo	DNS
—	Gabriele De Nard	Italy	DNS
—	Khodor Abdou	Lebanon	DNS
—	Amadu Kamara	Sierra Leone	DNS
—	Dauda Sundufu-Sowa	Sierra Leone	DNS
—	Mohammed Yagoub	Sudan	DNS
—	Rogart John	Tanzania	DNS
—	Jumanne Tluway	Tanzania	DNS
—	Israel Nari	Tanzania	DNS

^{†}: Alberto García from Spain finished about 20th in 11:42 min, but was disqualified.

==== Teams ====
Rank	Team	Points
1st place, gold medalist(s)	Kenya: John Kibowen / 2; Benjamin Limo / 3; Mike Kipyego / 4; Thomas Kiplitany / 5; (David Kilel) / (n/s); (Evans Kipchumba) / (n/s)	14
2nd place, silver medalist(s)	Ethiopia: Kenenisa Bekele / 1; Meba Tadesse / 7; Tessema Absher / 11; Abiyote Endale / 12; (Ketema Nigusse) / (n/s); (Dehe Woyesha) / (n/s)	31
3rd place, bronze medalist(s)	Morocco: Khalid El Amri / 6; Abderrahim Goumri / 9; Ahmed Baday / 14; Abdelkader Hachlaf / 15; (Saïd El Wardi) / (n/s); (Salah Hissou) / (n/s)	44
4	France: Smail Sghir / 8; Driss Maazouzi / 13; Hassan Oubassour / 26; Rachid Chékhémani / 31; (Irba Lakhal) / (n/s); (Aléxis Abraham) / (n/s)	78
5	Algeria: Fethi Meftah / 18; Azzedine Zerdoum / 19; Khoudir Aggoune / 23; Abdelhakim Maazouz / 33; (Tarek Boukensa) / (n/s); (Mohamed Khaldi) / (n/s)	93
6	Spain: Yousef El Nasri / 10; Antonio Manuel Martínez / 24; Sergio Gallardo / 30; Jesús España / 46; (José Luis Blanco) / (n/s)	110
7	Switzerland: Christian Belz / 16; Viktor Röthlin / 29; Philipp Bandi / 38; Peter Philipp / 55; (Jérôme Schaffner) / (n/s); (Michael Maechler) / (n/s)	138
8	United Kingdom: Chris Thompson / 17; Steven Vernon / 40; Chris Davies / 43; Chris Bolt / 48; (Mo Farah) / (n/s); (Angus MacLean) / (n/s)	148
9	New Zealand: Phil Costley / 25; Adrian Blincoe / 34; Rees Buck / 37; Michael Aish / 53; (Nick Willis) / (n/s)	149
10	Canada: Kevin Sullivan / 21; Joël Bourgeois / 39; Sean Kaley / 45; Jeremy Deere / 49; (Mark Bomba) / (n/s)	154
11	Italy: Luciano Di Pardo / 22; Umberto Pusterla / 28; Stefano Scaini / 51; Domenico D'Ambrosio / 57; (Giuliano Battocletti) / (n/s)	158
12	United States: Sandu Rebenciuc / 27; Dan Browne / 32; Karl Savage / 47; Luke Watson / 56; (Dan Wilson) / (n/s); (Ian Connor) / (n/s)	162
13	Portugal: Manuel Silva / 35; Fernando Silva / 36; Mário Teixeira / 42; José Ramos / 50; (Rui Silva) / (n/s); (Luís Feiteira) / (n/s)	163
14	Eritrea: Ali Abdalla / 20; Fortunato Yaccob / 41; Yonas Ogbagebriel / 58; Natnael Amare / 76	195
15	South Africa: Sivuyile Dlongwana / 54; David Mokwana / 59; Vincent Kuotane / 64; Alexander Motone / 65; (Mandla Maseko) / (n/s); (Anthony Godongwana) / (n/s)	242
16	Egypt: Ahmed Abd El Mangoud / 52; Abd Al-Rasool Ahmed / 63; Adel Behery / 67; Ahmed El Feky / 75	257
17	Ireland: Martin McCarthy / 56; Dermot Donnelly / 61; Noel Berkeley / 71; Robert Connolly / 72; (Gary Murray) / (n/s); (Nigel Brunton) / (n/s)	260
18	Belarus: Igor Teteryukov / 62; Ruslan Sadovskiy / 66; Aleksandr Nikolayuk / 68; Sergey Berdnik / 73	269
19	Belgium: Ridouane Es-Saadi / 60; Tim Clerbout / 69; Stijn van den Velde / 70; Monder Rizki / 74	273

- Note: Athletes in parentheses did not score for the team result (n/s: nonscorer)

== Participation ==
According to an unofficial count, 126 athletes from 37 countries participated in the Men's short race. The announced athletes from the Democratic Republic of the Congo, Lebanon, Sierra Leone, Sudan, and Tanzania did not show.

- Algeria (6)
- Andorra (2)
- Argentina (1)
- Azerbaijan (1)
- Bahrain (1)
- Belarus (4)
- Belgium (4)
- Brazil (1)
- Burundi (1)
- Canada (5)
- Central African Republic (1)
- Chile (1)
- Croatia (1)
- Egypt (4)
- Eritrea (4)
- Ethiopia (6)
- France (6)
- Iceland (2)
- Ireland (6)
- Italy (5)
- Kenya (6)
- Kyrgyzstan (2)
- Morocco (6)
- New Zealand (5)
- Peru (1)
- Portugal (6)
- Seychelles (2)
- Slovenia (1)
- South Africa (6)
- Spain (6)
- Switzerland (6)
- Turkmenistan (1)
- Uganda (1)
- United Kingdom (6)
- United States (6)
- U.S. Virgin Islands (1)
- Uzbekistan (2)

== See also ==
- 2003 IAAF World Cross Country Championships – Senior men's race
- 2003 IAAF World Cross Country Championships – Junior men's race
- 2003 IAAF World Cross Country Championships – Senior women's race
- 2003 IAAF World Cross Country Championships – Women's short race
- 2003 IAAF World Cross Country Championships – Junior women's race
