= 2003 IAAF World Cross Country Championships – Women's short race =

Women's short race at the 2003 IAAF World Cross Country Championships
- Organisers: IAAF
- Edition: 31st
- Date: March 30
- Host city: Lausanne, Vaud, Switzerland
- Venue: L'Institut Équestre National d'Avenches
- Events: 6
- Distances: 4.03 km – Women's short
- Participation: 99 athletes from 28 nations

The Women's short race at the 2003 IAAF World Cross Country Championships was held at the L'Institut Équestre National in Avenches near Lausanne, Switzerland, on March 30, 2003. Reports of the event were given in The New York Times, in the Herald, and for the IAAF.

Complete results for individuals, for teams, medallists, and the results of British athletes who took part were published.

== Race results ==
=== Women's short race (4.03 km) ===
==== Individual ====
Rank	Athlete	Country	Time
1st place, gold medalist(s)	Edith Masai	Kenya	12:43
2nd place, silver medalist(s)	Worknesh Kidane	Ethiopia	12:44
3rd place, bronze medalist(s)	Jane Wanjiku	Kenya	12:46
4	Isabella Ochichi	Kenya	12:48
5	Benita Johnson	Australia	12:48
6	Merima Denboba	Ethiopia	12:52
7	Tirunesh Dibaba	Ethiopia	12:54
8	Alla Zhilyayeva	Russia	12:56
9	Ejagayehu Dibaba	Ethiopia	12:59
10	Eyerusalem Kuma	Ethiopia	12:59
11	Prisca Ngetich	Kenya	13:04
12	Émilie Mondor	Canada	13:07
13	Zhor El Kamch	Morocco	13:11
14	Olga Romanova	Russia	13:12
15	Una English	Ireland	13:18
16	Anália Rosa	Portugal	13:18
17	Bouchra Chaâbi	Morocco	13:19
18	Liz Yelling	United Kingdom	13:21
19	Sonja Stolić	Yugoslavia	13:25
20	Margaret Maury	France	13:26
21	Zahra Ouaziz	Morocco	13:27
22	Viola Kibiwott	Kenya	13:28
23	Mónica Rosa	Portugal	13:29
24	Amaia Piedra	Spain	13:30
25	Zulema Fuentes-Pila	Spain	13:30
26	Anna Thompson	Australia	13:31
27	Rosanna Martin	Italy	13:32
28	Bezunesh Bekele	Ethiopia	13:33
29	Adélia Elias	Portugal	13:34
30	Anastasiya Zubova	Russia	13:35
31	Helen Clitheroe	United Kingdom	13:36
32	Kylie Risk	Australia	13:40
33	Nadia Al-Jaffaini	Bahrain	13:41
34	Viktoriya Klimina	Russia	13:41
35	Hayley Tullett	United Kingdom	13:42
36	Maria Martins	France	13:43
37	Carmen Douma	Canada	13:43
38	Sarah Toland	United States	13:44
39	Anita Weyermann	Switzerland	13:44
40	Jo Pavey	United Kingdom	13:44
41	Anne Keenan-Buckley	Ireland	13:45
42	Mariya Pantyukhova	Russia	13:46
43	Tatyana Borisova	Kyrgyzstan	13:47
44	Ouafa Frekech	Morocco	13:47
45	Hayley McGregor	Australia	13:47
46	Silvia Weissteiner	Italy	13:48
47	Fernanda Miranda	Portugal	13:48
48	Hana Chaouach	Tunisia	13:49
49	Cristina Petite	Spain	13:49
50	Catherine Chikwakwa	Malawi	13:50
51	Vincenza Sicari	Italy	13:50
52	Iris Fuentes-Pila	Spain	13:50
53	Heather Sagan	United States	13:52
54	Kathy Butler	United Kingdom	13:53
55	Ann Marie Brooks	United States	13:54
56	Sarah Dupré	Canada	13:55
57	Andrea Etter	Switzerland	13:57
58	Rocío Martínez	Spain	13:59
59	Seloua Ouaziz	Morocco	14:01
60	Melissa Moon	New Zealand	14:01
61	Kim Smith	New Zealand	14:02
62	Sarah Dillabaugh	Canada	14:03
63	Nasria Azaïdj	Algeria	14:04
64	Sonia Bejarano	Spain	14:04
65	Christine Bardelle	France	14:07
66	Clarisse Cruz	Portugal	14:08
67	Elisabete Lopes	Portugal	14:09
68	Susana Rebolledo	Chile	14:09
69	Collette Liss	United States	14:11
70	Eloise Poppett	Australia	14:14
71	Valerie Vaughan	Ireland	14:16
72	Angela Rinicella	Italy	14:18
73	Cristiana Artuso	Italy	14:19
74	Christina Carruzzo	Switzerland	14:19
75	Kumi Tanabe	Japan	14:22
76	Molly Austin	United States	14:26
77	Mieke Geens	Belgium	14:28
78	Breda Dennehy	Ireland	14:29
79	Freya Murray	United Kingdom	14:30
80	Margaret Butler	Canada	14:30
81	Monique Zimmer	Switzerland	14:34
82	Anja Buysse	Belgium	14:34
83	Liesbeth van de Velde	Belgium	14:35
84	Niamh Beirne	Ireland	14:37
85	Rachel Penney	New Zealand	14:42
86	Bouchra M'Darra	France	14:46
87	Susan Michelsson	Australia	14:47
88	Sonia Barry	New Zealand	14:48
89	Maria McCambridge	Ireland	14:49
90	Yekaterina Priladnykh	Russia	14:53
91	Renata Bucher	Switzerland	15:24
92	Nathalie De Vos	Belgium	15:27
93	Zamira Amirova	Uzbekistan	15:30
94	Nigiste Neguse	Eritrea	15:41
95	Doaa Adel	Egypt	15:59
96	Yyldyz Durdiyeva	Turkmenistan	16:36
97	Anna Sidorova	Uzbekistan	17:11
—	Elodie Olivares	France	DNF
—	Asmae Leghzaoui	Morocco	DQ^{†}
—	Laurence Duquenoy	France	DNS
—	Patrizia Tisi	Italy	DNS
—	Miwako Yamanaka	Japan	DNS
—	Helena Javornik	Slovenia	DNS

^{†}: Asmae Leghzaoui from Morocco finished 12th in 13:05 min, but was disqualified.

==== Teams ====
Rank	Team	Points
1st place, gold medalist(s)	Kenya: Edith Masai / 1; Jane Wanjiku / 3; Isabella Ochichi / 4; Prisca Ngetich / 10; (Viola Kibiwott) / (n/s)	18
2nd place, silver medalist(s)	Ethiopia: Worknesh Kidane / 2; Merima Denboba / 6; Tirunesh Dibaba / 7; Ejagayehu Dibaba / 9; (Eyerusalem Kuma) / (n/s); (Bezunesh Bekele) / (n/s)	24
3rd place, bronze medalist(s)	Russia: Alla Zhilyayeva / 8; Olga Romanova / 13; Anastasiya Zubova / 26; Viktoriya Klimina / 29; (Mariya Pantyukhova) / (n/s); (Yekaterina Priladnykh) / (n/s)	76
4	Morocco: Zhor El Kamch / 12; Bouchra Chaâbi / 16; Zahra Ouaziz / 19; Ouafa Frekech / 37; (Seloua Ouaziz) / (n/s)	84
5	Australia: Benita Johnson / 5; Anna Thompson / 23; Kylie Risk / 28; Hayley McGregor / 38; (Eloise Poppett) / (n/s); (Susan Michelsson) / (n/s)	94
6	Portugal: Anália Rosa / 15; Mónica Rosa / 20; Adélia Elias / 25; Fernanda Miranda / 40; (Clarisse Cruz) / (n/s); (Elisabete Lopes) / (n/s)	100
7	United Kingdom: Liz Yelling / 17; Helen Clitheroe / 27; Hayley Tullett / 30; Jo Pavey / 35; (Kathy Butler) / (n/s); (Freya Murray) / (n/s)	109
8	Spain: Amaia Piedra / 21; Zulema Fuentes-Pila / 22; Cristina Petite / 41; Iris Fuentes-Pila / 43; (Rocío Martínez) / (n/s); (Sonia Bejarano) / (n/s)	127
9	Canada: Émilie Mondor / 11; Carmen Douma / 32; Sarah Dupré / 46; Sarah Dillabaugh / 50; (Margaret Butler) / (n/s)	139
10	Italy: Rosanna Martin / 24; Silvia Weissteiner / 39; Vincenza Sicari / 42; Angela Rinicella / 54; (Cristiana Artuso) / (n/s)	159
11	Ireland: Una English / 14; Anne Keenan-Buckley / 36; Valerie Vaughan / 53; Breda Dennehy / 57; (Niamh Beirne) / (n/s); (Maria McCambridge) / (n/s)	160
12	France: Margaret Maury / 18; Maria Martins / 31; Christine Bardelle / 51; Bouchra M'Darra / 62; (Elodie Olivares) / (DNF)	162
13	United States: Sarah Toland / 33; Heather Sagan / 44; Ann Marie Brooks / 45; Collette Liss / 52; (Molly Austin) / (n/s)	174
14	Switzerland: Anita Weyermann / 34; Andrea Etter / 47; Christina Carruzzo / 55; Monique Zimmer / 58; (Renata Bucher) / (n/s)	194
15	New Zealand: Melissa Moon / 48; Kim Smith / 49; Rachel Penney / 61; Sonia Barry / 63	221
16	Belgium: Mieke Geens / 56; Anja Buysse / 59; Liesbeth van de Velde / 60; Nathalie De Vos / 64	239

- Note: Athletes in parentheses did not score for the team result (n/s: nonscorer)

== Participation ==
According to an unofficial count, 99 athletes from 28 countries participated in the Women's short race. The announced athlete from Slovenia did not show.

- Algeria (1)
- Australia (6)
- Bahrain (1)
- Belgium (4)
- Canada (5)
- Chile (1)
- Egypt (1)
- Eritrea (1)
- Ethiopia (6)
- France (5)
- Ireland (6)
- Italy (5)
- Japan (1)
- Kenya (5)
- Kyrgyzstan (1)
- Malawi (1)
- Morocco (6)
- New Zealand (4)
- Portugal (6)
- Russia (6)
- Spain (6)
- Switzerland (5)
- Tunisia (1)
- Turkmenistan (1)
- United Kingdom (6)
- United States (5)
- Uzbekistan (2)
- Yugoslavia (1)

== See also ==
- 2003 IAAF World Cross Country Championships – Senior men's race
- 2003 IAAF World Cross Country Championships – Men's short race
- 2003 IAAF World Cross Country Championships – Junior men's race
- 2003 IAAF World Cross Country Championships – Senior women's race
- 2003 IAAF World Cross Country Championships – Junior women's race
