= 2003 IAAF World Cross Country Championships – Senior women's race =

Senior women's race at the 2003 IAAF World Cross Country Championships
- Organisers: IAAF
- Edition: 31st
- Date: March 29
- Host city: Lausanne, Vaud, Switzerland
- Venue: L'Institut Équestre National d'Avenches
- Events: 1
- Distances: 7.92 km – Senior women
- Participation: 65 athletes from 25 nations

The Senior women's race at the 2003 IAAF World Cross Country Championships was held at the L'Institut Équestre National in Avenches near Lausanne, Switzerland, on March 29, 2003. Reports of the event were given in The New York Times, in the Herald, and for the IAAF.

Complete results for individuals, for teams, medallists, and the results of British athletes who took part were published.

== Race results ==
=== Senior women's race (7.92 km) ===
==== Individual ====
Rank	Athlete	Country	Time
1st place, gold medalist(s)	Worknesh Kidane	Ethiopia	25:53
2nd place, silver medalist(s)	Deena Drossin	United States	26:02
3rd place, bronze medalist(s)	Merima Denboba	Ethiopia	26:28
4	Eyerusalem Kuma	Ethiopia	26:30
5	Magdaline Chemjor	Kenya	26:33
6	Elizabeth Rumokol	Kenya	26:37
7	Colleen de Reuck	United States	26:49
8	Caroline Kilel	Kenya	26:55
9	Tereza Yohanes	Ethiopia	27:06
10	Asha Gigi	Ethiopia	27:12
11	Anália Rosa	Portugal	27:19
12	Jepkorir Ayabei	Kenya	27:27
13	Rocío Ríos	Spain	27:31
14	Alice Timbilil	Kenya	27:34
15	Katie McGregor	United States	27:36
16	Nebiat Habtemariam	Eritrea	27:37
17	Elva Dryer	United States	27:43
18	Beatriz Santíago	Spain	27:46
19	Hayley Yelling	United Kingdom	27:47
20	Helena Javornik	Slovenia	27:48
21	Patrizia Tisi	Italy	27:49
22	Kazue Ogoshi	Japan	27:50
23	Dorthe Vibjerg	Denmark	27:52
24	Ana Dias	Portugal	27:56
25	Milena Glusac	United States	27:57
26	María Abel	Spain	28:01
27	Fátima Cabral	Portugal	28:02
28	Louise Damen	United Kingdom	28:03
29	Alessandra Aguilar	Spain	28:04
30	Nadia Al-Jaffaini	Bahrain	28:13
31	Inês Monteiro	Portugal	28:15
32	Catherine Chikwakwa	Malawi	28:18
33	Bizunesh Deba	Ethiopia	28:18
34	Maria Luisa Lárraga	Spain	28:19
35	Marie-Luce Romanens	Switzerland	28:24
36	Helena Sampaio	Portugal	28:33
37	Claudia Oberli	Switzerland	28:34
38	Tausi Juma	Tanzania	28:35
39	Sara Wells	United States	28:43
40	Michelle Carson	Canada	28:45
41	Mónica Rosa	Portugal	28:45
42	Laura Pinela	Spain	28:53
43	Meryem Khali	Morocco	28:55
44	Mirja Moser	Switzerland	28:56
45	Kim Offergeld	Belgium	28:57
46	Soud Kanbouchia	Morocco	29:06
47	Faith Kamangila	Zimbabwe	29:29
48	Rukia Mkanda	Tanzania	29:34
49	Alison Rendell	Canada	29:37
50	Anja Smolders	Belgium	29:49
51	Corinne Debaets	Belgium	30:02
52	Melissa Moon	New Zealand	30:06
53	Maria Zambrano	Canada	30:08
54	Janine Moffett	Canada	30:14
55	Dina Cruz	Guatemala	30:37
56	Alexandra Babcock	Canada	31:00
57	Sarah Ali-Kahn	Canada	31:14
58	Samira Daoui	Morocco	31:20
59	Yekaterina Shatnaya	Kazakhstan	31:58
60	Lisha Hamilton	U.S. Virgin Islands	32:23
61	Dildar Mamedova	Turkmenistan	33:30
—	Sonja Stolić	Yugoslavia	DNF
—	Fatiha Baouf	Belgium	DNF
—	Pamela Chepchumba	Kenya	DQ^{†}
—	Asmae Leghzaoui	Morocco	DQ^{†}
—	Soumiya Labani	Morocco	DQ
—	Restituta Joseph	Tanzania	DNS
—	Banuelia Katesigwa	Tanzania	DNS

^{†}: Pamela Chepchumba from Kenya finished 6th in 26:35 min, Asmae Leghzaoui from Morocco finished 18th in 27:39 min, but both were disqualified.

==== Teams ====
Rank	Team	Points
1st place, gold medalist(s)	Ethiopia: Worknesh Kidane / 1; Merima Denboba / 3; Eyerusalem Kuma / 4; Tereza Yohanes / 9; (Asha Gigi) / (n/s); (Bizunesh Deba) / (n/s)	17
2nd place, silver medalist(s)	Kenya: Magdaline Chemjor / 5; Elizabeth Rumokol / 6; Caroline Kilel / 8; Jepkorir Ayabei / 11; (Alice Timbilil) / (n/s)	30
3rd place, bronze medalist(s)	United States: Deena Drossin / 2; Colleen de Reuck / 7; Katie McGregor / 13; Elva Dryer / 14; (Milena Glusac) / (n/s); (Sara Wells) / (n/s)	36
4	Spain: Rocío Ríos / 12; Beatriz Santíago / 15; María Abel / 17; Alessandra Aguilar / 19; (Maria Luisa Lárraga) / (n/s); (Laura Pinela) / (n/s)	63
5	Portugal: Anália Rosa / 10; Ana Dias / 16; Fátima Cabral / 18; Inês Monteiro / 20; (Helena Sampaio) / (n/s); (Mónica Rosa) / (n/s)	64
6	Canada: Michelle Carson / 21; Alison Rendell / 22; Maria Zambrano / 23; Janine Moffett / 24; (Alexandra Babcock) / (n/s); (Sarah Ali-Kahn) / (n/s)	90
DNF	Belgium: (Kim Offergeld) / (n/s); (Anja Smolders) / (n/s); (Corinne Debaets) / (n/s); (Fatiha Baouf) / (DNF)	DNF
DQ	Morocco: (Meryem Khali) / (n/s); (Soud Kanbouchia) / (n/s); (Samira Daoui) / (n/s); (Asmae Leghzaoui) / (DQ); (Soumiya Labani) / (DQ)	DQ

- Note: Athletes in parentheses did not score for the team result (n/s: nonscorer)

== Participation ==
According to an unofficial count, 65 athletes from 25 countries participated in the Senior women's race.

- Bahrain (1)
- Belgium (4)
- Canada (6)
- Denmark (1)
- Eritrea (1)
- Ethiopia (6)
- Guatemala (1)
- Italy (1)
- Japan (1)
- Kazakhstan (1)
- Kenya (6)
- Malawi (1)
- Morocco (4)
- New Zealand (1)
- Portugal (6)
- Slovenia (1)
- Spain (6)
- Switzerland (3)
- Tanzania (2)
- Turkmenistan (1)
- United Kingdom (2)
- United States (6)
- U.S. Virgin Islands (1)
- Yugoslavia (1)
- Zimbabwe (1)

== See also ==
- 2003 IAAF World Cross Country Championships – Senior men's race
- 2003 IAAF World Cross Country Championships – Men's short race
- 2003 IAAF World Cross Country Championships – Junior men's race
- 2003 IAAF World Cross Country Championships – Women's short race
- 2003 IAAF World Cross Country Championships – Junior women's race
