= 2003 IAAF World Cross Country Championships – Senior men's race =

Senior men's race at the 2003 IAAF World Cross Country Championships
- Organisers: IAAF
- Edition: 31st
- Date: March 30
- Host city: Lausanne, Vaud, Switzerland
- Venue: L'Institut Équestre National d'Avenches
- Events: 1
- Distances: 12.355 km – Senior men
- Participation: 113 athletes from 37 nations

The Senior men's race at the 2003 IAAF World Cross Country Championships was held at the L'Institut Équestre National in Avenches near Lausanne, Switzerland, on March 30, 2003. Reports of the event were given in The New York Times, in the Herald, and for the IAAF.

Complete results for individuals, for teams, medallists, and the results of British athletes who took part were published.

== Race results ==
=== Senior men's race (12.355 km) ===
==== Individual ====
Rank	Athlete	Country	Time
1st place, gold medalist(s)	Kenenisa Bekele	Ethiopia	35:56
2nd place, silver medalist(s)	Patrick Ivuti	Kenya	36:09
3rd place, bronze medalist(s)	Gebre-egziabher Gebremariam	Ethiopia	36:17
4	Richard Limo	Kenya	36:39
5	Paul Koech	Kenya	36:42
6	John Cheruiyot Korir	Kenya	36:50
7	Sileshi Sihine	Ethiopia	37:03
8	Hicham Chatt	Morocco	37:07
9	Zersenay Tadesse	Eritrea	37:10
10	Khalid El Amri	Morocco	37:12
11	Meb Keflezighi	United States	37:16
12	Abraham Cherono	Kenya	37:17
13	Ketema Nigusse	Ethiopia	37:18
14	Sammy Kipketer	Kenya	37:30
15	Abderrahim Goumri	Morocco	37:32
16	Eduardo Henriques	Portugal	37:33
17	José Manuel Martínez	Spain	37:35
18	Julio Rey	Spain	37:38
19	Fabiano Joseph	Tanzania	37:49
20	Dejene Berhanu	Ethiopia	37:50
21	José Rios	Spain	37:50
22	Fabián Roncero	Spain	37:59
23	Jaouad Gharib	Morocco	38:06
24	Michael Ngaaseke	Zimbabwe	38:16
25	Yevgeniy Bozhko	Ukraine	38:17
26	Ridha El Amri	Tunisia	38:19
27	Saïd El Wardi	Morocco	38:25
28	Hélder Ornelas	Portugal	38:28
29	Faustin Baha	Tanzania	38:36
30	Dieudonné Disi	Rwanda	38:38
31	Manuel Magalhães	Portugal	38:39
32	Phil Costley	New Zealand	38:40
33	Alfredo Bráz	Portugal	38:42
34	Ahmed El Hamzaoui	Morocco	38:45
35	Abdi Abdirahman	United States	38:54
36	Gabalebe Moloko	Botswana	38:58
37	Yibeltal Admassu	Ethiopia	38:59
38	Israel Nari	Tanzania	39:00
39	Eliseo Martín	Spain	39:01
40	Jean-Claude Mushingantahe	Burundi	39:03
41	Tesfayohannes Mesfen	Eritrea	39:05
42	Arthur Osman	Poland	39:06
43	Cutbert Nyasango	Zimbabwe	39:06
44	Vasyl Matviychuk	Ukraine	39:08
45	Umberto Pusterla	Italy	39:10
46	Freddy González	Venezuela	39:14
47	Dieudonné Gahungu	Burundi	39:18
48	Maurizio Leone	Italy	39:20
49	Matt Smith	United Kingdom	39:22
50	Stephen Rogart	Tanzania	39:23
51	Edwardo Torres	United States	39:25
52	Simon Bairu	Canada	39:31
53	Kabo Gabaseme	Botswana	39:45
54	Omid Mehrabi	Iran	39:46
55	Mohamed Belasri	France	39:48
56	Tom van Hooste	Belgium	39:51
57	Jafar Babakhani	Iran	39:51
58	Chad Johnson	United States	39:56
59	Alberto Maravilha	Portugal	40:01
60	Tiyapo Maso	Botswana	40:03
61	Rees Buck	New Zealand	40:05
62	Tesfit Berhe	Eritrea	40:09
63	Christian Nemeth	Belgium	40:10
64	Rachid Safari	Rwanda	40:10
65	Jafred Lorone	Uganda	40:11
66	Eric Gillis	Canada	40:11
67	Hans Janssens	Belgium	40:17
68	Keenetse Moswasi	Botswana	40:17
69	Rob Birchall	United Kingdom	40:20
70	Bruno Heuberger	Switzerland	40:23
71	Dave Cullum	United States	40:24
72	François Bagambiki	Rwanda	40:26
73	Glynn Tromans	United Kingdom	40:28
74	Jean Bosco Ndagijimana	Rwanda	40:32
75	José Amado García	Guatemala	40:35
76	Tekle Menghisteab	Eritrea	40:38
77	Athanase Manirazika	Burundi	40:44
78	Gervais Nzeyimana	Rwanda	40:53
79	Nick Rogers	United States	41:01
80	Eric Sindayigaya	Burundi	41:07
81	Dou Zhaobo	China	41:11
82	Zheng Kai	China	41:16
83	Scott Winton	New Zealand	41:19
84	Chen Fuchun	China	41:19
85	Matthew Holder	New Zealand	41:20
86	Tom Compernolle	Belgium	41:40
87	Risa Ghadimi	Iran	41:44
88	Michael Booth	Canada	41:49
89	Jamie Epp	Canada	41:54
90	Yevgeniy Medvednikov	Kazakhstan	41:55
91	Sun Wenyong	China	41:56
92	Cheikh Ndiaye	Senegal	41:57
93	Ali El-Zaidi	Libya	41:57
94	Francis Khanje	Malawi	41:58
95	Ahmad Joldei	Iran	42:04
96	Rodwell Kamwendo	Malawi	42:36
97	Abraham Habte	Eritrea	43:48
98	Natnael Amare	Eritrea	44:53
99	Kemal Tuvakuliyev	Turkmenistan	45:32
100	Bakhodur Boimuradov	Tajikistan	46:36
101	Cesar Condori	Bolivia	46:43
102	Sehad Gunner	Kyrgyzstan	51:48
—	Domingos Castro	Portugal	DNF
—	Sergiy Lebid	Ukraine	DNF
—	Enrique Molina	Spain	DNF
—	Kamel Kohil	Algeria	DNF
—	Giuliano Battocletti	Italy	DNF
—	Jean-Berchmans Ndayisenga	Burundi	DNF
—	Spencer Barden	United Kingdom	DNF
—	Egide Manirazika	Burundi	DNF
—	Scott Simpson	Canada	DNF
—	Mark Miles	United Kingdom	DNF
—	Al-Mustafa Riyadh	Bahrain	DNF
—	Graham Cocksedge	Canada	DNS
—	Jonathan Monje	Chile	DNS
—	Noel Berkeley	Ireland	DNS
—	Martin McCarthy	Ireland	DNS

==== Teams ====
Rank	Team	Points
1st place, gold medalist(s)	Kenya: Patrick Ivuti / 2; Richard Limo / 4; Paul Koech / 5; John Cheruiyot Korir / 6; (Abraham Cherono) / (n/s); (Sammy Kipketer) / (n/s)	17
2nd place, silver medalist(s)	Ethiopia: Kenenisa Bekele / 1; Gebre-egziabher Gebremariam / 3; Sileshi Sihine / 7; Ketema Nigusse / 12; (Dejene Berhanu) / (n/s); (Yibeltal Admassu) / (n/s)	23
3rd place, bronze medalist(s)	Morocco: Hicham Chatt / 8; Khalid El Amri / 10; Abderrahim Goumri / 13; Jaouad Gharib / 20; (Saïd El Wardi) / (n/s); (Ahmed El Hamzaoui) / (n/s)	51
4	Spain: José Manuel Martínez / 15; Julio Rey / 16; José Rios / 18; Fabián Roncero / 19; (Eliseo Martín) / (n/s); (Enrique Molina) / (DNF)	68
5	Portugal: Eduardo Henriques / 14; Hélder Ornelas / 21; Manuel Magalhães / 24; Alfredo Bráz / 26; (Alberto Maravilha) / (n/s); (Domingos Castro) / (DNF)	85
6	Tanzania: Fabiano Joseph / 17; Faustin Baha / 22; Israel Nari / 29; Stephen Rogart / 33	101
7	United States: Meb Keflezighi / 11; Abdi Abdirahman / 27; Edwardo Torres / 34; Chad Johnson / 40; (Dave Cullum) / (n/s); (Nick Rogers) / (n/s)	112
8	Eritrea: Zersenay Tadesse / 9; Tesfayohannes Mesfen / 31; Tesfit Berhe / 43; Tekle Menghisteab / 51; (Abraham Habte) / (n/s); (Natnael Amare) / (n/s)	134
9	Botswana: Gabalebe Moloko / 28; Kabo Gabaseme / 36; Tiyapo Maso / 41; Keenetse Moswasi / 48	153
10	Rwanda: Dieudonné Disi / 23; Rachid Safari / 45; François Bagambiki / 49; Jean Bosco Ndagijimana / 50; (Gervais Nzeyimana) / (n/s)	167
11	Burundi: Jean-Claude Mushingantahe / 30; Dieudonné Gahungu / 32; Athanase Manirazika / 52; Eric Sindayigaya / 53; (Jean-Berchmans Ndayisenga) / (DNF); (Egide Manirazika) / (DNF)	167
12	New Zealand: Phil Costley / 25; Rees Buck / 42; Scott Winton / 56; Matthew Holder / 58	181
13	Belgium: Tom van Hooste / 38; Christian Nemeth / 44; Hans Janssens / 47; Tom Compernolle / 59	188
14	Iran: Omid Mehrabi / 37; Jafar Babakhani / 39; Risa Ghadimi / 60; Ahmad Joldei / 64	200
15	Canada: Simon Bairu / 35; Eric Gillis / 46; Michael Booth / 61; Jamie Epp / 62; (Scott Simpson) / (DNF)	204
16	China: Dou Zhaobo / 54; Zheng Kai / 55; Chen Fuchun / 57; Sun Wenyong / 63	229
DNF	United Kingdom: Matt Smith / (n/s); Rob Birchall / (n/s); Glynn Tromans / (n/s); Spencer Barden / (DNF); (Mark Miles) / (DNF)	DNF

- Note: Athletes in parentheses did not score for the team result (n/s: nonscorer)

== Participation ==
According to an unofficial count, 113 athletes from 37 countries participated in the Senior men's race. The announced athletes from Chile and Ireland did not show.

- Algeria (1)
- Bahrain (1)
- Belgium (4)
- Bolivia (1)
- Botswana (4)
- Burundi (6)
- Canada (5)
- China (4)
- Eritrea (6)
- Ethiopia (6)
- France (1)
- Guatemala (1)
- Iran (4)
- Italy (3)
- Kazakhstan (1)
- Kenya (6)
- Kyrgyzstan (1)
- Libya (1)
- Malawi (2)
- Morocco (6)
- New Zealand (4)
- Poland (1)
- Portugal (6)
- Rwanda (5)
- Senegal (1)
- Spain (6)
- Switzerland (1)
- Tajikistan (1)
- Tanzania (4)
- Turkmenistan (1)
- Tunisia (1)
- Uganda (1)
- Ukraine (3)
- United Kingdom (5)
- United States (6)
- Venezuela (1)
- Zimbabwe (2)

== See also ==
- 2003 IAAF World Cross Country Championships – Men's short race
- 2003 IAAF World Cross Country Championships – Junior men's race
- 2003 IAAF World Cross Country Championships – Senior women's race
- 2003 IAAF World Cross Country Championships – Women's short race
- 2003 IAAF World Cross Country Championships – Junior women's race
