= 2003 IAAF World Cross Country Championships =

Coordinates: 46°53′10″N 7°00′42″E

- Organisers: IAAF
- Edition: 31st
- Date: March 29/30
- Host city: Lausanne, Vaud, Switzerland
- Venue: L'Institut Équestre National d'Avenches
- Events: 6
- Distances: 12.355 km – Senior men 4.03 km – Men's short 7.92 km – Junior men 7.92 km – Senior women 4.03 km – Women's short 6.215 – Junior women
- Participation: 605 athletes from 65 nations

The 2003 IAAF World Cross Country Championships took place on March 29/30, 2003. The races were held at the L'Institut Équestre National in Avenches near Lausanne, Switzerland. Reports of the event were given in The New York Times, in the Herald, and for the IAAF.

Complete results for senior men, for senior men's teams, for men's short race, for men's short race teams, for junior men, for junior men's teams, senior women, for senior women's teams, for women's short race, for women's short race teams, for junior women, for junior women's teams, medallists, and the results of British athletes who took part were published.

== Doping ==
There were several doping positives at the championships.

=== Positives at the 2003 IAAF World Cross Country Championships ===
- Pamela Chepchumba Kenya – 2-year ban (EPO)
- Alberto García Fernandez Spain – 2-year ban (EPO)
- Soumiya Labani Morocco – 2-year ban
- Asmae Leghzaoui Morocco – 2-year ban (EPO)

== Medallists ==
Event	Gold		Silver		Bronze	
Individual
Senior men (12.355 km)	Kenenisa Bekele; Ethiopia	35:56	Patrick Ivuti; Kenya	36:09	Gebre-egziabher Gebremariam; Ethiopia	36:17
Men's short (4.03 km)	Kenenisa Bekele; Ethiopia	11:01	John Kibowen; Kenya	11:04	Benjamin Limo; Kenya	11:06
Junior men (7.92 km)	Eliud Kipchoge; Kenya	22:47	Boniface Kiprop; Uganda	22:49	Solomon Bushendich; Kenya	22:51
Senior women (7.92 km)	Worknesh Kidane; Ethiopia	25:53	Deena Drossin; United States	26:02	Merima Denboba; Ethiopia	26:28
Women's short (4.03 km)	Edith Masai; Kenya	12:43	Worknesh Kidane; Ethiopia	12:44	Jane Wanjiku; Kenya	12:46
Junior women (6.215)	Tirunesh Dibaba; Ethiopia	20:21	Peninah Chepchumba; Kenya	20:22	Gelete Burka; Ethiopia	20:28
Team
Senior men	Kenya	17	Ethiopia	23	Morocco	51
Men's short	Kenya	14	Ethiopia	31	Morocco	44
Junior men	Kenya	15	Ethiopia	28	Uganda	48
Senior women	Ethiopia	17	Kenya	30	United States	36
Women's short	Kenya	18	Ethiopia	24	Russia	76
Junior women	Ethiopia	14	Kenya	22	Morocco	78

== Race results ==
=== Senior men's race (12.355 km) ===
Individual race
Rank	Athlete	Country	Time
1st place, gold medalist(s)	Kenenisa Bekele	Ethiopia	35:56
2nd place, silver medalist(s)	Patrick Ivuti	Kenya	36:09
3rd place, bronze medalist(s)	Gebre-egziabher Gebremariam	Ethiopia	36:17
4	Richard Limo	Kenya	36:39
5	Paul Koech	Kenya	36:42
6	John Cheruiyot Korir	Kenya	36:50
7	Sileshi Sihine	Ethiopia	37:03
8	Hicham Chatt	Morocco	37:07
9	Zersenay Tadesse	Eritrea	37:10
10	Khalid El Amri	Morocco	37:12
11	Meb Keflezighi	United States	37:16
12	Abraham Cherono	Kenya	37:17
Full results

Teams
Rank	Team	Points
1st place, gold medalist(s)	Kenya: Patrick Ivuti / 2; Richard Limo / 4; Paul Koech / 5; John Cheruiyot Korir / 6; (Abraham Cherono) / (n/s); (Sammy Kipketer) / (n/s)	17
2nd place, silver medalist(s)	Ethiopia: Kenenisa Bekele / 1; Gebre-egziabher Gebremariam / 3; Sileshi Sihine / 7; Ketema Nigusse / 12; (Dejene Berhanu) / (n/s); (Yibeltal Admassu) / (n/s)	23
3rd place, bronze medalist(s)	Morocco: Hicham Chatt / 8; Khalid El Amri / 10; Abderrahim Goumri / 13; Jaouad Gharib / 20; (Saïd El Wardi) / (n/s); (Ahmed El Hamzaoui) / (n/s)	51
4	Spain	68
5	Portugal	85
6	Tanzania	101
7	United States	112
8	Eritrea	134
Full results

- Note: Athletes in parentheses did not score for the team result (n/s: nonscorer)

=== Men's short race (4.03 km) ===
Individual race
Rank	Athlete	Country	Time
1st place, gold medalist(s)	Kenenisa Bekele	Ethiopia	11:01
2nd place, silver medalist(s)	John Kibowen	Kenya	11:04
3rd place, bronze medalist(s)	Benjamin Limo	Kenya	11:06
4	Mike Kipyego	Kenya	11:18
5	Thomas Kiplitany	Kenya	11:20
6	Khalid El Amri	Morocco	11:22
7	Meba Tadesse	Ethiopia	11:24
8	David Kilel	Kenya	11:25
9	Smail Sghir	France	11:27
10	Abderrahim Goumri	Morocco	11:28
11	Yousef El Nasri	Spain	11:28
12	Tessema Absher	Ethiopia	11:29
Full results

Teams
Rank	Team	Points
1st place, gold medalist(s)	Kenya: John Kibowen / 2; Benjamin Limo / 3; Mike Kipyego / 4; Thomas Kiplitany / 5; (David Kilel) / (n/s); (Evans Kipchumba) / (n/s)	14
2nd place, silver medalist(s)	Ethiopia: Kenenisa Bekele / 1; Meba Tadesse / 7; Tessema Absher / 11; Abiyote Endale / 12; (Ketema Nigussie) / (n/s); (Dehe Woyesha) / (n/s)	31
3rd place, bronze medalist(s)	Morocco: Khalid El Amri / 6; Abderrahim Goumri / 9; Ahmed Baday / 14; Abdelkader Hachlaf / 15; (Saïd El Wardi) / (n/s); (Salah Hissou) / (n/s)	44
4	France	78
5	Algeria	93
6	Spain	110
7	Switzerland	138
8	United Kingdom	148
Full results

- Note: Athletes in parentheses did not score for the team result (n/s: nonscorer)

=== Junior men's race (7.92 km) ===
Individual race
Rank	Athlete	Country	Time
1st place, gold medalist(s)	Eliud Kipchoge	Kenya	22:47
2nd place, silver medalist(s)	Boniface Kiprop	Uganda	22:49
3rd place, bronze medalist(s)	Solomon Bushendich	Kenya	22:51
4	Augustine Choge	Kenya	22:55
5	Girma Assefa	Ethiopia	22:58
6	Getachew Dinku	Ethiopia	23:10
7	Moses Mosop	Kenya	23:17
8	Tessema Absher	Ethiopia	23:22
9	Solomon Molla	Ethiopia	23:27
10	Barnabas Kosgei	Kenya	23:45
11	Dehe Woyesha	Ethiopia	24:03
12	Kipkorir Chepkwony	Kenya	24:06
Full results

Teams
Rank	Team	Points
1st place, gold medalist(s)	Kenya: Eliud Kipchoge / 1; Solomon Bushendich / 3; Augustine Choge / 4; Moses Mosop / 7; (Barnabas Kosgei) / (n/s); (Kipkorir Chepkwony) / (n/s)	15
2nd place, silver medalist(s)	Ethiopia: Girma Assefa / 5; Getachew Dinku / 6; Tessema Absher / 8; Solomon Molla / 9; (Dehe Woyesha) / (n/s); (Tesfaye Mengistu) / (n/s)	28
3rd place, bronze medalist(s)	Uganda: Boniface Kiprop / 2; James Kibet / 10; Moses Kipsiro / 14; Isaac Kiprop / 22; (Martin Kiplimo) / (n/s)	48
4	Morocco	63
5	Eritrea	72
6	Algeria	103
7	Russia	108
8	United States	121
Full results

- Note: Athletes in parentheses did not score for the team result (n/s: nonscorer)

=== Senior women's race (7.92 km) ===
Individual race
Rank	Athlete	Country	Time
1st place, gold medalist(s)	Worknesh Kidane	Ethiopia	25:53
2nd place, silver medalist(s)	Deena Drossin	United States	26:02
3rd place, bronze medalist(s)	Merima Denboba	Ethiopia	26:28
4	Eyerusalem Kuma	Ethiopia	26:30
5	Magdaline Chemjor	Kenya	26:33
6	Elizabeth Rumokol	Kenya	26:37
7	Colleen de Reuck	United States	26:49
8	Caroline Kilel	Kenya	26:55
9	Tereza Yohanes	Ethiopia	27:06
10	Asha Gigi	Ethiopia	27:12
11	Anália Rosa	Portugal	27:19
12	Jepkorir Ayabei	Kenya	27:27
Full results

Teams
Rank	Team	Points
1st place, gold medalist(s)	Ethiopia: Worknesh Kidane / 1; Merima Denboba / 3; Eyerusalem Kuma / 4; Tereza Yohanes / 9; (Asha Gigi) / (n/s); (Bizunesh Deba) / (n/s)	17
2nd place, silver medalist(s)	Kenya: Magdaline Chemjor / 5; Elizabeth Rumokol / 6; Caroline Kilel / 8; Jepkorir Ayabei / 11; (Alice Timbilil) / (n/s)	30
3rd place, bronze medalist(s)	United States: Deena Drossin / 2; Colleen de Reuck / 7; Katie McGregor / 13; Elva Dryer / 14; (Milena Glusac) / (n/s); (Sara Wells) / (n/s)	36
4	Spain	63
5	Portugal	64
6	Canada	90
Full results

- Note: Athletes in parentheses did not score for the team result (n/s: nonscorer)

=== Women's short race (4.03 km) ===
Individual race
Rank	Athlete	Country	Time
1st place, gold medalist(s)	Edith Masai	Kenya	12:43
2nd place, silver medalist(s)	Worknesh Kidane	Ethiopia	12:44
3rd place, bronze medalist(s)	Jane Wanjiku	Kenya	12:46
4	Isabella Ochichi	Kenya	12:48
5	Benita Johnson	Australia	12:48
6	Merima Denboba	Ethiopia	12:52
7	Tirunesh Dibaba	Ethiopia	12:54
8	Alla Zhilyayeva	Russia	12:56
9	Ejagayehu Dibaba	Ethiopia	12:59
10	Eyerusalem Kuma	Ethiopia	12:59
11	Prisca Ngetich	Kenya	13:04
12	Émilie Mondor	Canada	13:07
Full results

Teams
Rank	Team	Points
1st place, gold medalist(s)	Kenya: Edith Masai / 1; Jane Wanjiku / 3; Isabella Ochichi / 4; Prisca Ngetich / 10; (Viola Kibiwott) / (n/s)	18
2nd place, silver medalist(s)	Ethiopia: Worknesh Kidane / 2; Merima Denboba / 6; Tirunesh Dibaba / 7; Ejagayehu Dibaba / 9; (Eyerusalem Kuma) / (n/s); (Bezunesh Bekele) / (n/s)	24
3rd place, bronze medalist(s)	Russia: Alla Zhilyayeva / 8; Olga Romanova / 13; Anastasiya Zubova / 26; Viktoriya Klimina / 29; (Mariya Pantyukhova) / (n/s); (Yekaterina Priladnykh) / (n/s)	76
4	Morocco	84
5	Australia	94
6	Portugal	100
7	United Kingdom	109
8	Spain	127
Full results

- Note: Athletes in parentheses did not score for the team result (n/s: nonscorer)

=== Junior women's race (6.215) ===
Individual race
Rank	Athlete	Country	Time
1st place, gold medalist(s)	Tirunesh Dibaba	Ethiopia	20:21
2nd place, silver medalist(s)	Peninah Chepchumba	Kenya	20:22
3rd place, bronze medalist(s)	Gelete Burka	Ethiopia	20:28
4	Meselech Melkamu	Ethiopia	20:33
5	Emily Chebet	Kenya	20:39
6	Sentayehu Ejigu	Ethiopia	20:56
7	Gladys Chemweno	Kenya	21:09
8	Anesie Kwizera	Burundi	21:13
9	Chemutai Rionotukei	Kenya	21:33
10	Valentine Koech	Kenya	21:34
11	Sharon Kipsang	Kenya	21:40
12	Aziza Aliyu	Ethiopia	21:49
Full results

Teams
Rank	Team	Points
1st place, gold medalist(s)	Ethiopia: Tirunesh Dibaba / 1; Gelete Burka / 3; Meselech Melkamu / 4; Sentayehu Ejigu / 6; (Aziza Aliyu) / (n/s); (Belaynesh Fekadu) / (n/s)	14
2nd place, silver medalist(s)	Kenya: Peninah Chepchumba / 2; Emily Chebet / 5; Gladys Chemweno / 7; Chemutai Rionotukei / 8; (Valentine Koech) / (n/s); (Sharon Kipsang) / (n/s)	22
3rd place, bronze medalist(s)	Morocco: Mariem Alaoui Selsouli / 9; Siham Hilali / 11; Najat El Fiddi / 13; Loubna Jao / 45; (Laila Klilech) / (n/s); (Fatna Chtoina) / (n/s)	78
4	United States	82
5	United Kingdom	82
6	China	91
7	Tunisia	94
8	France	147
Full results

- Note: Athletes in parentheses did not score for the team result (n/s: nonscorer)

== Medal table (unofficial) ==
Rank	Nation	Gold	Silver	Bronze	Total
1	Ethiopia	6	5	3	14
1	Kenya	6	5	3	14
3	Uganda	0	1	1	2
3	United States	0	1	1	2
5	Morocco	0	0	3	3
6	Russia	0	0	1	1
Totals (6 entries)		12	12	12	36

- Note: Totals include both individual and team medals, with medals in the team competition counting as one medal.

== Participation ==
According to an unofficial count, 605 athletes from 65 countries participated. This is in agreement with the official numbers as published. The announced athletes from the Democratic Republic of the Congo, from Guinea, Lebanon, and Sierra Leone did not show.

- Algeria (20)
- Andorra (2)
- Argentina (1)
- Australia (8)
- Azerbaijan (1)
- Bahrain (3)
- Belarus (12)
- Belgium (24)
- Bolivia (1)
- Botswana (4)
- Brazil (2)
- Burundi (8)
- Canada (33)
- Central African Republic (1)
- Chile (2)
- China (9)
- Croatia (3)
- Denmark (1)
- Egypt (12)
- Eritrea (16)
- Ethiopia (28)
- France (22)
- Gibraltar (2)
- Guatemala (2)
- Hong Kong (1)
- Iran (4)
- Iceland (2)
- Ireland (14)
- Italy (18)
- Japan (2)
- Kazakhstan (2)
- Kenya (35)
- Kyrgyzstan (4)
- Libya (1)
- Malawi (3)
- Morocco (31)
- Netherlands (1)
- New Zealand (12)
- Peru (1)
- Poland (1)
- Portugal (24)
- Romania (4)
- Russia (12)
- Rwanda (7)
- Senegal (1)
- Seychelles (2)
- Slovenia (2)
- South Africa (8)
- Spain (36)
- Sudan (5)
- Switzerland (23)
- Tajikistan (5)
- Tanzania (6)
- Tunisia (12)
- Turkey (10)
- Turkmenistan (6)
- Uganda (7)
- Ukraine (3)
- United Kingdom (29)
- United States (35)
- U.S. Virgin Islands (2)
- Uzbekistan (12)
- Venezuela (1)
- Yugoslavia (1)
- Zimbabwe (3)

== See also ==
- 2003 IAAF World Cross Country Championships – Senior men's race
- 2003 IAAF World Cross Country Championships – Men's short race
- 2003 IAAF World Cross Country Championships – Junior men's race
- 2003 IAAF World Cross Country Championships – Senior women's race
- 2003 IAAF World Cross Country Championships – Women's short race
- 2003 IAAF World Cross Country Championships – Junior women's race
- 2003 in athletics (track and field)
