= 2003 IAAF World Cross Country Championships – Junior women's race =

Junior women's race at the 2003 IAAF World Cross Country Championships
- Organisers: IAAF
- Edition: 31st
- Date: March 29
- Host city: Lausanne, Vaud, Switzerland
- Venue: L'Institut Équestre National d'Avenches
- Events: 1
- Distances: 6.215 – Junior women
- Participation: 104 athletes from 31 nations

The Junior women's race at the 2003 IAAF World Cross Country Championships was held at the L'Institut Équestre National in Avenches near Lausanne, Switzerland, on March 29, 2003. Reports on the event were given in The New York Times, in the Herald, and for the IAAF.

Complete results for individuals, for teams, medallists, and the results of British athletes who took part were published.

== Race results ==
=== Junior women's race (6.215) ===
==== Individual ====
Rank	Athlete	Country	Time
1st place, gold medalist(s)	Tirunesh Dibaba	Ethiopia	20:21
2nd place, silver medalist(s)	Peninah Chepchumba	Kenya	20:22
3rd place, bronze medalist(s)	Gelete Burka	Ethiopia	20:28
4	Meselech Melkamu	Ethiopia	20:33
5	Emily Chebet	Kenya	20:39
6	Sentayehu Ejigu	Ethiopia	20:56
7	Gladys Chemweno	Kenya	21:09
8	Anesie Kwizera	Burundi	21:13
9	Chemutai Rionotukei	Kenya	21:33
10	Valentine Koech	Kenya	21:34
11	Sharon Kipsang	Kenya	21:40
12	Aziza Aliyu	Ethiopia	21:49
13	Mariem Alaoui Selsouli	Morocco	21:54
14	Charlotte Dale	United Kingdom	21:56
15	Simret Sultan	Eritrea	22:11
16	Irvette van Blerk	South Africa	22:17
17	Lamberte Nyabamikazi	Rwanda	22:18
18	Belaynesh Fekadu	Ethiopia	22:31
19	Siham Hilali	Morocco	22:32
20	Amy Hastings	United States	22:34
21	Stefanie Murer	Switzerland	22:38
22	Najat El Fiddi	Morocco	22:47
23	Habiba Ghribi	Tunisia	22:48
24	Olga Minina	Belarus	22:48
25	Rebecca Walter	United States	22:50
26	Silvia La Barbera	Italy	22:54
27	Danielle Barnes	United Kingdom	22:58
28	Türkan Bozkurt	Turkey	22:59
29	Zhang Chong	China	23:00
30	Adina Barbinta	Romania	23:03
31	Marta Romo	Spain	23:14
32	Laura Silva	Portugal	23:22
33	Fionnuala Britton	Ireland	23:23
34	Yousra Jemmali	Tunisia	23:30
35	Liu Lixia	China	23:30
36	Li Lihua	China	23:32
37	Aine Hoban	United Kingdom	23:34
38	Amira Benamor	Tunisia	23:34
39	Clara Horowitz	United States	23:35
40	Yang Juan	China	23:35
41	Julia Lucas	United States	23:40
42	Nancy Frouin	France	23:41
43	Anne-Laure Vidal	France	23:43
44	Faye Fullerton	United Kingdom	23:45
45	Clare Goodwin	New Zealand	23:54
46	Hanane Makhloufi	Algeria	23:56
47	Jiang Chengcheng	China	23:58
48	Yekaterina Tunguskova	Uzbekistan	24:00
49	Imène Badraoui	Tunisia	24:00
50	Safa Aissaoui	Tunisia	24:01
51	Angela Homan	United States	24:02
52	Chahrazad Cheboub	Algeria	24:02
53	Olga Rezkaya	Belarus	24:03
54	Marieken Verhaeghe	Belgium	24:04
55	Aslı Çakır	Turkey	24:05
56	Mélanie Veron	France	24:06
57	Ruth Proctor	United Kingdom	24:06
58	Laura Hodgson	United States	24:08
59	Corina Dumbrăveanu	Romania	24:09
60	Nikki Tufts	Canada	24:12
61	Anke van Campen	Belgium	24:19
62	Isabel Macías	Spain	24:20
63	Sophie Maranda	Canada	24:21
64	Clemantine Nyiraguhirwa	Rwanda	24:26
65	Marta Fernández	Spain	24:30
66	Loubna Jao	Morocco	24:36
67	Doaa Adel	Egypt	24:36
68	Tatyana Lukashuk	Belarus	24:38
69	Barkehoum Belagrouz	Algeria	24:39
70	Jenny Leonard	France	24:43
71	Laila Klilech	Morocco	24:49
72	Hanem Abou Seada	Egypt	24:49
73	Fatna Chtoina	Morocco	24:50
74	Danette Doetzel	Canada	24:55
75	Kirsten Braem	Belgium	24:57
76	Irina Padabed	Belarus	24:58
77	Carmen Ballard	Canada	25:03
78	Lynelle Blignaut	South Africa	25:04
79	Fatma Zohra Kasdi	Algeria	25:07
80	Edna Souza	Brazil	25:10
81	Maica Rodríguez	Spain	25:14
82	Deborah Büttel	Switzerland	25:15
83	Sara Abou Hassan	Egypt	25:17
84	Julia Hicks	Canada	25:18
85	Seham El Agizy	Egypt	25:20
86	Heba Abou Wahdan	Egypt	25:25
87	Hassiba Mahiddine	Algeria	25:26
88	Amanda McAllister	Canada	25:33
89	Helena Pluymers	Belgium	25:37
90	Veronika Kirgizbayeva	Uzbekistan	25:39
91	Fadhila Cheffara	Algeria	25:58
92	Irina Moroz	Uzbekistan	26:02
93	Marina Khmelevskaya	Uzbekistan	26:29
94	Monica Gutierrez	Spain	26:34
95	Yeter Karakoc	Turkey	26:39
96	Aysen Özkul	Turkey	27:01
97	Marija Loncarevic	Croatia	27:13
98	Binnaz Uslu	Turkey	27:23
99	Nadima Mirzoeva	Tajikistan	28:43
100	Parvina Ziyaeva	Tajikistan	29:32
—	Adrienne Herzog	Netherlands	DNF
—	Katrina Wootton	United Kingdom	DNF
—	Miriam Ortiz	Spain	DNF
—	Yekaterina Ilyazova	Turkmenistan	DNF
—	Evelyne Mayunga	DR Congo	DNS
—	Lemlem Bereket	Eritrea	DNS
—	Élodie Guégan	France	DNS
—	Maiama Baïlo Souare	Guinea	DNS

==== Teams ====
Rank	Team	Points
1st place, gold medalist(s)	Ethiopia: Tirunesh Dibaba / 1; Gelete Burka / 3; Meselech Melkamu / 4; Sentayehu Ejigu / 6; (Aziza Aliyu) / (n/s); (Belaynesh Fekadu) / (n/s)	14
2nd place, silver medalist(s)	Kenya: Peninah Chepchumba / 2; Emily Chebet / 5; Gladys Chemweno / 7; Chemutai Rionotukei / 8; (Valentine Koech) / (n/s); (Sharon Kipsang) / (n/s)	22
3rd place, bronze medalist(s)	Morocco: Mariem Alaoui Selsouli / 9; Siham Hilali / 11; Najat El Fiddi / 13; Loubna Jao / 45; (Laila Klilech) / (n/s); (Fatna Chtoina) / (n/s)	78
4	United States: Amy Hastings / 12; Rebecca Walter / 16; Clara Horowitz / 26; Julia Lucas / 28; (Angela Homan) / (n/s); (Laura Hodgson) / (n/s)	82
5	United Kingdom: Charlotte Dale / 10; Danielle Barnes / 17; Aine Hoban / 24; Faye Fullerton / 31; (Ruth Proctor) / (n/s); (Katrina Wootton) / (DNF)	82
6	China: Zhang Chong / 19; Liu Lixia / 22; Li Lihua / 23; Yang Juan / 27; (Jiang Chengcheng) / (n/s)	91
7	Tunisia: Habiba Ghribi / 14; Yousra Jemmali / 21; Amira Benamor / 25; Imène Badraoui / 34; (Safa Aissaoui) / (n/s)	94
8	France: Nancy Frouin / 29; Anne-Laure Vidal / 30; Mélanie Veron / 39; Jenny Leonard / 49	147
9	Belarus: Olga Minina / 15; Olga Rezkaya / 36; Tatyana Lukashuk / 47; Irina Padabed / 53	151
10	Spain: Marta Romo / 20; Isabel Macías / 42; Marta Fernández / 44; Maica Rodríguez / 56; (Monica Gutierrez) / (n/s); (Miriam Ortiz) / (DNF)	162
11	Algeria: Hanane Makhloufi / 32; Chahrazad Cheboub / 35; Barkehoum Belagrouz / 48; Fatma Zohra Kasdi / 55; (Hassiba Mahiddine) / (n/s); (Fadhila Cheffara) / (n/s)	170
12	Turkey: Türkan Bozkurt / 18; Aslı Çakır / 38; Yeter Karakoc / 63; Aysen Özkul / 64; (Binnaz Uslu) / (n/s)	183
13	Canada: Nikki Tufts / 40; Sophie Maranda / 43; Danette Doetzel / 51; Carmen Ballard / 54; (Julia Hicks) / (n/s); (Amanda McAllister) / (n/s)	188
14	Belgium: Marieken Verhaeghe / 37; Anke van Campen / 41; Kirsten Braem / 52; Helena Pluymers / 59	189
15	Egypt: Doaa Adel / 46; Hanem Abou Seada / 50; Sara Abou Hassan / 57; Seham El Agizy / 58; (Heba Abou Wahdan) / (n/s)	211
16	Uzbekistan: Yekaterina Tunguskova / 33; Veronika Kirgizbayeva / 60; Irina Moroz / 61; Marina Khmelevskaya / 62	216

- Note: Athletes in parentheses did not score for the team result (n/s: nonscorer)

== Participation ==
According to an unofficial count, 104 athletes from 31 countries participated in the Junior women's race. This is in agreement with the official numbers as published. The announced athletes from the Democratic Republic of the Congo and Guinea did not show.

- Algeria (6)
- Belarus (4)
- Belgium (4)
- Brazil (1)
- Burundi (1)
- Canada (6)
- China (5)
- Croatia (1)
- Egypt (5)
- Eritrea (1)
- Ethiopia (6)
- France (4)
- Ireland (1)
- Italy (1)
- Kenya (6)
- Morocco (6)
- Netherlands (1)
- New Zealand (1)
- Portugal (1)
- Romania (2)
- Rwanda (2)
- South Africa (2)
- Spain (6)
- Switzerland (2)
- Tajikistan (2)
- Tunisia (5)
- Turkey (5)
- Turkmenistan (1)
- United Kingdom (6)
- United States (6)
- Uzbekistan (4)

== See also ==
- 2003 IAAF World Cross Country Championships – Senior men's race
- 2003 IAAF World Cross Country Championships – Men's short race
- 2003 IAAF World Cross Country Championships – Junior men's race
- 2003 IAAF World Cross Country Championships – Senior women's race
- 2003 IAAF World Cross Country Championships – Women's short race
