= 2003 IAAF World Cross Country Championships – Junior men's race =

Junior men's race at the 2003 IAAF World Cross Country Championships
- Organisers: IAAF
- Edition: 31st
- Date: March 30
- Host city: Lausanne, Vaud, Switzerland
- Venue: L'Institut Équestre National d'Avenches
- Events: 1
- Distances: 7.92 km – Junior men
- Participation: 121 athletes from 30 nations

The Junior men's race at the 2003 IAAF World Cross Country Championships was held at the L'Institut Équestre National in Avenches near Lausanne, Switzerland, on March 30, 2003. Reports of the event were given in The New York Times, in the Herald, and for the IAAF.

Complete results for individuals, for teams, medallists, and the results of British athletes who took part were published.

== Race results ==
=== Junior men's race (7.92 km) ===
==== Individual ====
Rank	Athlete	Country	Time
1st place, gold medalist(s)	Eliud Kipchoge	Kenya	22:47
2nd place, silver medalist(s)	Boniface Kiprop	Uganda	22:49
3rd place, bronze medalist(s)	Solomon Bushendich	Kenya	22:51
4	Augustine Choge	Kenya	22:55
5	Girma Assefa	Ethiopia	22:58
6	Getachew Dinku	Ethiopia	23:10
7	Moses Mosop	Kenya	23:17
8	Tessema Absher	Ethiopia	23:22
9	Solomon Molla	Ethiopia	23:27
10	Barnabas Kosgei	Kenya	23:45
11	Dehe Woyesha	Ethiopia	24:03
12	Kipkorir Chepkwony	Kenya	24:06
13	James Kibet	Uganda	24:10
14	Simon Tesfai	Eritrea	24:11
15	Tesfaye Mengistu	Ethiopia	24:12
16	Tadesse Abrham	Eritrea	24:14
17	Yassine Mandour	Morocco	24:15
18	Moses Kipsiro	Uganda	24:17
19	Lahoussine Dhame	Morocco	24:26
20	Noureddine Athamna	Algeria	24:29
21	Mohamed Fadil	Morocco	24:36
22	Driss Bensaïd	Morocco	24:38
23	Yegeniy Rybakov	Russia	24:39
24	Samson Kiflemariam	Eritrea	24:50
25	Yassine Abatourab	Morocco	24:51
26	Billy Nelson (athlete)	United States	24:52
27	Isaac Kiprop	Uganda	24:55
28	Mohamed Moustaoui	Morocco	24:59
29	Aïssa Dahmar	Algeria	25:07
30	Mourad Naami	Algeria	25:11
31	Ahmed Khamlaoui	Tunisia	25:13
32	Martin Kiplimo	Uganda	25:14
33	Aleksey Aleksandrov	Russia	25:25
34	Timothy Moore	United States	25:25
35	Anatoliy Rybakov	Russia	25:29
36	Teklit Ketema	Eritrea	25:35
37	Ali Abdalla	Sudan	25:36
38	Jérémy Pierrat	France	25:38
39	Peter Ashak	Sudan	25:40
40	Cristinel Irimia	Romania	25:41
41	Abdalla Abdelgadir	Sudan	25:46
42	Mario van Wayenberghe	Belgium	25:47
43	Mikhail Zhdanov	Russia	25:47
44	Brett Gotcher	United States	25:48
45	Andy Weilacher	United States	25:49
46	James Hower	United States	25:50
47	Aleksey Reunkov	Russia	25:50
48	Tom Humphries	United Kingdom	25:54
49	Ibrahim Sboui	Tunisia	25:56
50	Hamza Djeghima	Algeria	25:56
51	Kurt Benninger	Canada	25:59
52	Stefano La Rosa	Italy	26:01
53	Mohamed El Gayar	Egypt	26:03
54	Ryan McLeod	United Kingdom	26:06
55	Yoan Meudec	France	26:07
56	David Pomies	France	26:10
57	Marco Majori	Italy	26:11
58	Djelloul Aggoun	Algeria	26:11
59	Adam Hortian	Canada	26:13
60	Hamaza Hamid	Sudan	26:14
61	Arkaitz Nogales	Spain	26:15
62	Marius Ionescu	Romania	26:16
63	Bret Schoolmeester	United States	26:17
64	Stefano Cugusi	Italy	26:19
65	Aleksandr Mikhaylov	Belarus	26:19
66	Christopher Berraho	France	26:20
67	Amer Ayyad Helil	Egypt	26:21
68	Joaquin Carlus	Spain	26:23
69	Marc Roig	Spain	26:26
70	Benyoucef Fettah	Algeria	26:26
71	Francisco España	Spain	26:27
72	Braden Novakowski	Canada	26:29
73	Nihat Kaya	Turkey	26:30
74	Craig Appleby	Australia	26:34
75	Ruslan Nasyrov	Uzbekistan	26:39
76	Tom Lancashire	United Kingdom	26:44
77	Ahmed El Radi	Sudan	26:45
78	Ali Yaydar Tekgoz	Turkey	26:46
79	Kristjan Hunter	Canada	26:46
80	Alexis Traub	France	26:50
81	Sergey Reunkov	Russia	26:51
82	Kristof Mouton	Belgium	26:53
83	Vitaliy Kolodin	Turkmenistan	26:54
84	Collis Birmingham	Australia	26:55
85	Rolf Rüfenacht	Switzerland	26:57
86	Mohamed Ali Gmati	Tunisia	26:59
87	Yuriy Adnaochka	Belarus	26:59
88	Daniel Fässler	Switzerland	27:02
89	Tsimafei Nedzialevich	Belarus	27:05
90	Ajmal Amirov	Tajikistan	27:05
91	Ahmed Bakry	Egypt	27:10
92	Mathias Büschi	Switzerland	27:11
93	Sam Jacobs	United Kingdom	27:13
94	Claudio Ammann	Switzerland	27:17
95	Matt Loiselle	Canada	27:18
96	Erdal Bucut	Turkey	27:20
97	Gert van Poucke	Belgium	27:21
98	Omar Rached	Italy	27:21
99	Matija Petricevic	Croatia	27:22
100	Slaheddine Chnini	Tunisia	27:23
101	Geoff Kerr	Canada	27:41
102	Nozimjon Irmatov	Tajikistan	27:51
103	Pedro Martins	Portugal	27:52
104	Alejandro González	Spain	27:57
105	Hamdullah Gul	Turkey	28:09
106	Patrick Gentsch	Switzerland	28:11
107	Marat Nizamov	Uzbekistan	28:29
108	Denis Galerin	Belgium	28:47
109	Yodgor Akhmatov	Uzbekistan	28:54
110	Michael Sanchez	Gibraltar	28:57
111	Amir Garifullin	Uzbekistan	28:57
112	Igor Daronin	Belarus	29:05
113	Fabian Hertner	Switzerland	29:18
114	Adem Belir	Turkey	31:43
115	Gi Ka Man	Hong Kong	32:07
116	Lee Taylor	Gibraltar	34:17
—	Philippe Le Ferrand	France	DNF
—	Mark Christie	Ireland	DNF
—	Salah Badri	Tunisia	DNF
—	Enea Longo	Italy	DNF
—	José Antonio Molina	Spain	DNF
—	Zaki Hussein	Egypt	DNS

==== Teams ====
Rank	Team	Points
1st place, gold medalist(s)	Kenya: Eliud Kipchoge / 1; Solomon Bushendich / 3; Augustine Choge / 4; Moses Mosop / 7; (Barnabas Kosgei) / (n/s); (Kipkorir Chepkwony) / (n/s)	15
2nd place, silver medalist(s)	Ethiopia: Girma Assefa / 5; Getachew Dinku / 6; Tessema Absher / 8; Solomon Molla / 9; (Dehe Woyesha) / (n/s); (Tesfaye Mengistu) / (n/s)	28
3rd place, bronze medalist(s)	Uganda: Boniface Kiprop / 2; James Kibet / 10; Moses Kipsiro / 14; Isaac Kiprop / 22; (Martin Kiplimo) / (n/s)	48
4	Morocco: Yassine Mandour / 13; Lahoussine Dhame / 15; Mohamed Fadil / 17; Driss Bensaïd / 18; (Yassine Abatourab) / (n/s); (Mohamed Moustaoui) / (n/s)	63
5	Eritrea: Simon Tesfai / 11; Tadesse Abrham / 12; Samson Kiflemariam / 20; Teklit Ketema / 29	72
6	Algeria: Noureddine Athamna / 16; Aïssa Dahmar / 23; Mourad Naami / 24; Hamza Djeghima / 40; (Djelloul Aggoun) / (n/s); (Benyoucef Fettah) / (n/s)	103
7	Russia: Yegeniy Rybakov / 19; Aleksey Aleksandrov / 26; Anatoliy Rybakov / 28; Mikhail Zhdanov / 35; (Aleksey Reunkov) / (n/s); (Sergey Reunkov) / (n/s)	108
8	United States: Billy Nelson (athlete) / 21; Timothy Moore / 27; Brett Gotcher / 36; Andy Weilacher / 37; (James Hower) / (n/s); (Bret Schoolmeester) / (n/s)	121
9	Sudan: Ali Abdalla / 30; Peter Ashak / 32; Abdalla Abdelgadir / 33; Hamaza Hamid / 48; (Ahmed El Radi) / (n/s)	143
10	France: Jérémy Pierrat / 31; Yoan Meudec / 44; David Pomies / 45; Christopher Berraho / 52; (Alexis Traub) / (n/s); (Philippe Le Ferrand) / (DNF)	172
11	Tunisia: Ahmed Khamlaoui / 25; Ibrahim Sboui / 39; Mohamed Ali Gmati / 64; Slaheddine Chnini / 74; (Salah Badri) / (DNF)	202
12	Canada: Kurt Benninger / 41; Adam Hortian / 47; Braden Novakowski / 56; Kristjan Hunter / 61; (Matt Loiselle) / (n/s); (Geoff Kerr) / (n/s)	205
13	United Kingdom: Tom Humphries / 38; Ryan McLeod / 43; Tom Lancashire / 59; Sam Jacobs / 69	209
14	Spain: Arkaitz Nogales / 49; Joaquin Carlus / 53; Marc Roig / 54; Francisco España / 55; (Alejandro González) / (n/s); (José Antonio Molina) / (DNF)	211
15	Italy: Stefano La Rosa / 42; Marco Majori / 46; Stefano Cugusi / 50; Omar Rachedi / 73; (Enea Longo) / (DNF)	211
16	Belgium: Mario van Wayenberghe / 34; Kristof Mouton / 62; Gert van Poucke / 72; Denis Galerin / 77	245
17	Turkey: Nihat Kaya / 57; Ali Yaydar Tekgoz / 60; Erdal Bucut / 71; Hamdullah Gul / 75; (Adem Belir) / (n/s)	263
18	Belarus: Aleksandr Mikhaylov / 51; Yuriy Adnaochka / 65; Tsimafei Nedzialevich / 67; Igor Daronin / 80	263
19	Switzerland: Rolf Rüfenacht / 63; Daniel Fässler / 66; Mathias Büschi / 68; Claudio Ammann / 70; (Patrick Gentsch) / (n/s); (Fabian Hertner) / (n/s)	267
20	Uzbekistan: Ruslan Nasyrov / 58; Marat Nizamov / 76; Yodgor Akhmatov / 78; Amir Garifullin / 79	291

- Note: Athletes in parentheses did not score for the team result (n/s: nonscorer)

== Participation ==
According to an unofficial count, 121 athletes from 30 countries participated in the Junior men's race. This is in agreement with the official numbers as published.

- Algeria (6)
- Australia (2)
- Belarus (4)
- Belgium (4)
- Canada (6)
- Croatia (1)
- Egypt (3)
- Eritrea (4)
- Ethiopia (6)
- France (6)
- Gibraltar (2)
- Hong Kong (1)
- Ireland (1)
- Italy (5)
- Kenya (6)
- Morocco (6)
- Portugal (1)
- Romania (2)
- Russia (6)
- Spain (6)
- Sudan (5)
- Switzerland (6)
- Tajikistan (2)
- Tunisia (5)
- Turkey (5)
- Turkmenistan (1)
- Uganda (5)
- United Kingdom (4)
- United States (6)
- Uzbekistan (4)

== See also ==
- 2003 IAAF World Cross Country Championships – Senior men's race
- 2003 IAAF World Cross Country Championships – Men's short race
- 2003 IAAF World Cross Country Championships – Senior women's race
- 2003 IAAF World Cross Country Championships – Women's short race
- 2003 IAAF World Cross Country Championships – Junior women's race
