= Solomon Molla =

Ethiopian long-distance runner

Personal information
- Nationality: Ethiopian
- Born: 1987 (age 38–39) Tigray Province, Ethiopia

Sport
- Sport: Running
- Event(s): 10 km, half marathon, marathon
- Club: Atlas Mountains Athletics

Solomon Molla (Amharic: ሶሎሞን ሞልላ; born 1987) is an Ethiopian athlete who specialises in long distance running, including the marathon. He has a personal best of 2:08:46 hours that event and won the 2008 JoongAng Seoul Marathon. He is a two-time participant at the IAAF World Cross Country Championships.

== Career ==
Born in Tigray Province, he had his first experience of international competition at the IAAF World Cross Country Championships. A second place in the national championships (behind Tessema Abshiro) meant he was selected for the junior race at the 2003 IAAF World Cross Country Championships in Lausanne, and he finished in ninth position. In 2004, he ran at the Great Ethiopian Run, finishing eighth in the 10 km race, and came second in the 10,000 metres at the Addis Ababa municipal championships.

In February the following year, he upset the favoured Tariku Bekele to win the 8 km race at the Jan Meda International Cross Country. Based on this performance, he was entered into the 2005 IAAF World Cross Country Championships and he improved on his previous showing with an eighth-place finish. He became the Addis Ababa Municipal champion over 10,000 m that summer. The following year, he won the men's short race at the Jan Meda Addis Ababa Municipal Cross Country Championships, but could only manage third in the longer junior race. He closed his 2006 season with a run at the Obudu Ranch Mountain Race, a mountain running competition at the Obudu Cattle Ranch in Nigeria, and his top-eight finish was enough to take a share of the prize money. A summer of road running in the United States in 2007 was highlighted by a third-place finish in the Azalea Trail Run (with a new best of 28:39), and fourth at the Cooper River Bridge Run. At the end of the year, he decided to move up to the marathon distance, saying that it would better suit his abilities. His first attempt at the distance came at the JoongAng Seoul Marathon, where he managed to finish fourteenth.

He finished seventh at the Marrakesh Marathon in January 2008, and set a half marathon best of 1:02:40 in Rabat in April. He further improved his marathon time at the Ottawa Marathon two months later: his time of 2:11:04.8 beat his previous best by seven minutes and he took second place behind David Cheruiyot. His breakout performance came at the JoongAng Seoul Marathon in November: he further improved his best to win the race in 2:08:46, ranking among the top eight Ethiopian marathon runners that season.

In his second full year of marathon running, he attended the Boston Marathon for the first time and finished with a time of 2:12:02 to take seventh place. He did not compete for over 18 months, only returning in November 2011. He was a shadow of his former self at the Beirut Marathon, coming ninth with a time of 2:17:37 hours. A year passed and he entered the Beijing Marathon, showed a resurgence in form by coming third in 2:10:20 hours. He placed third at the Houston Marathon in January 2013.

== Personal bests ==
Surface	Event	Time (h:m:s)	Venue	Date
Track	5000 m	13:52.93	Villeneuve d'Ascq, France	15 June 2003
Track	10,000 m	28:25.27	Palo Alto, California, United States	29 May 2005
Road	10 km	28:39	Mobile, Alabama, United States	24 March 2007
Road	Half marathon	1:02:40	Rabat, Morocco	24 April 2008
Road	Marathon	2:08:46	Seoul, South Korea	2 November 2008

- All information taken from IAAF profile.
