= 2006 African Championships in Athletics – Women's 10,000 metres =

The women's 10,000 metres event at the 2006 African Championships in Athletics was held at the Stade Germain Comarmond on August 12.

== Results ==
Rank	Name	Nationality	Time	Notes
1st place, gold medalist(s)	Edith Masai	Kenya	31:27.96	
2nd place, silver medalist(s)	Isabella Ochichi	Kenya	31:29.43	
3rd place, bronze medalist(s)	Emily Chebet	Kenya	31:33.39	
4	Aheza Kiros	Ethiopia	31:35.81	
5	Bezunesh Bekele	Ethiopia	31:42.91	
6	Furtuna Zegergish	Eritrea	34:37.49	
7	Angeline Nyiransabimana	Rwanda	35:25.64	
	Asmae Leghzaoui	Morocco	DNF	
	Ejegayehu Dibaba	Ethiopia	DNF	
