= Kilel =

Kilel is a surname of Kenyan origin. Notable people with the surname include:

- Caroline Kilel (born 1981), Kenyan long-distance runner
- David Kilel (born 1984), Kenyan long-distance track runner
