= Mohamed Moustaoui =

Moroccan middle-distance runner

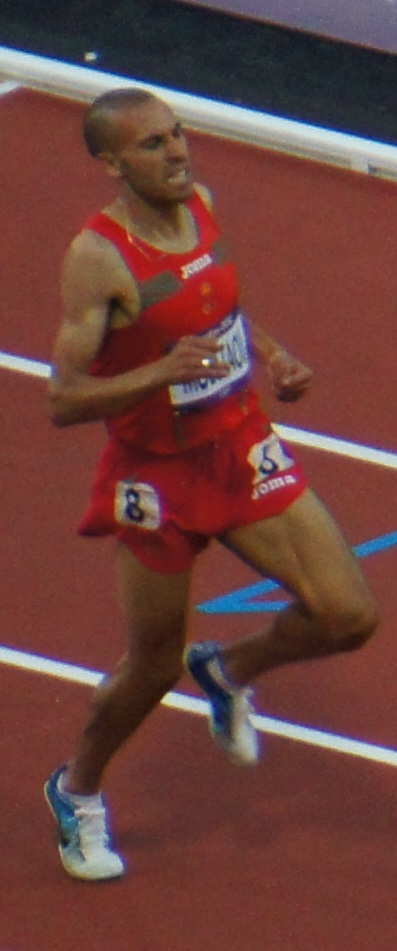
Mohamed Moustaoui at the 2012 Summer Olympics

Mohamed Moustaoui (born 2 April 1985 in Khouribga) is a Moroccan middle-distance runner who specializes in the 1500 metres.

== Competition record ==
Year	Competition	Venue	Position	Event	Notes
Representing Morocco
2003	World Cross Country Championships	Lausanne, Switzerland	28th	Junior race (7.92 km)	24:59
2003	African Junior Championships	Garoua, Cameroon	2nd	1500 m	3:42.9
2004	World Cross Country Championships	Brussels, Belgium	14th	Junior race (8 km)	25:25
2004	World Junior Championships	Grosseto, Italy	4th	1500 m	3:37.44
2005	Islamic Solidarity Games	Mecca, Saudi Arabia	4th	5000 m	14:13.93
2005	World Cross Country Championships	Saint-Étienne, France	14th	Short race (4.196 km)	11:59
2006	African Championships	Bambous, Mauritius	5th	1500 m	3:47.06
2006	World Athletics Final	Stuttgart, Germany	4th	1500 m	3:33.76
2007	World Championships	Osaka, Japan	16th (sf)	1500 m	3:43.39
2007	World Athletics Final	Stuttgart, Germany	9th	1500 m	3:42.49
2008	Olympic Games	Beijing, China	20th (sf)	1500 m	3:40.90
2009	Mediterranean Games	Pescara, Italy	2nd	1500 m	3:37.97
2009	World Championships	Berlin, Germany	6th	1500 m	3:36.57
2011	World Championships	Daegu, South Korea	6th	1500 m	3:36.80
2012	Olympic Games	London, United Kingdom	19th (sf)	1500 m	3:43.33
2013	World Championships	Moscow, Russia	9th	1500 m	3:38.08
2013	Islamic Solidarity Games	Palembang, Indonesia	3rd	1500 m	3:41.20

=== Personal bests ===
Outdoors

- 800 metres – 1:45.44 (2009)
- 1500 metres – 3:31.84 (2011)
- One mile – 3:50.08 (2008)
- 3000 metres – 7:43.99 (2011)
- 5000 metres – 13:22.61 (2005)

Indoors

- 1000 metres – 2:20.00 (2008)
- 1500 metres – 3:35.0 (2014)
- 2000 metres – 5:00.98 (2007)
- 3000 metres – 7:40.00 (2014)
- Two miles – 8:26.49 (2005)
