= Emily Chebet =

Kenyan long-distance runner (born 1986)

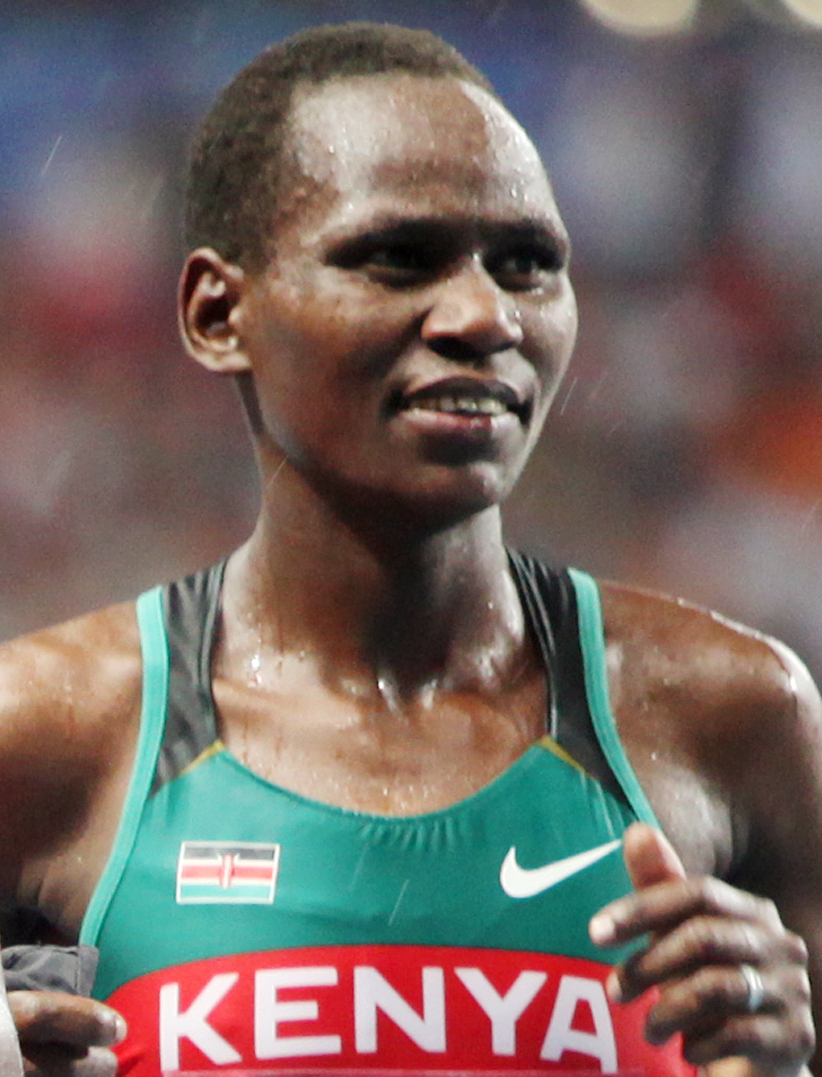
- 2013

Medal record

Women's athletics

Representing Kenya

World Cross Country Championships
Gold medal – first place	2010 Bydgoszcz	Senior race
Gold medal – first place	2013 Bydgoszcz	Senior race
Gold medal – first place	2023 Bathurst	Senior team

Commonwealth Games
Bronze medal – third place	2014 Glasgow	10,000 m

African Championships
Silver medal – second place	2014 Marrakesh	10,000 m
Bronze medal – third place	2006 Bambous	10,000 m

Emily Chebet Muge (born 18 February 1986) is a Kenyan professional long-distance runner who specialises in the 10,000 metres and cross country running. She is a two-time winner of the IAAF World Cross Country Championships, being the gold medallist in 2010 and 2013.

Chebet's first medal was a bronze in the 10,000 m at the 2006 African Championships in Athletics and she also ran in that event at the 2007 World Championships in Athletics.

In 2015, Chebet received a four year competition ban for testing positive for a banned substance.

== Career ==
=== Early career ===
Emily Chebet was born in Ainamoi in the Bomet District, a small settlement in Kenya's Rift Valley Province. Her father Joel Rono was a runner and, after seeing the success of Caroline Cheptanui Kilel (another budding runner from the village), Chebet decided to stop her studies and join the Kericho track club to try to become a professional runner.

She made her first international appearance in the junior race at the 2003 IAAF World Cross Country Championships, where she finished in fifth place and won the junior team silver medal along with Peninah Jepchumba. She competed at meetings in Spain and Portugal in 2004, running in the 1500 metres, 3000 metres and a couple of 10K runs. The following year she missed a place on the national team in cross country but she set a 3000 m best of 8:53.46 minutes at the Meeting Gaz de France in Paris. After taking second place at the Kenyan Athletics Championships, Chebet had her first senior podium finish at the 2006 African Championships, where she was the bronze medallist behind fellow Kenyans Edith Masai and Isabella Ochichi. In 2007, she did not finish in the heat of Mombasa at the 2007 IAAF World Cross Country Championships, but she won the 10,000 m. She finished ninth in the 10,000 m at the 2007 World Championships. In her final outing of the year she helped Kenya to second place at the Chiba Ekiden Relay, having run the 5 km leg.

She skipped the 2008 and 2009 seasons as she married Edward Muge and the couple had their first child, Serah Cherono.

=== World champion ===
She had a significant breakthrough in 2010 as she won the senior women's race at the 2010 IAAF World Cross Country Championships, out-sprinting Linet Masai (the world champion on the track) to take her first major world title. Chebet finished second in the 2010 Bay to Breakers. A few weeks later, she broke the course record at the Freihofer's Run for Women 5K; her six-second improvement on the record was the greatest ever in the race's history. She was defeated at the NYRR New York Mini 10K by national rival Linet Masai, but still finished as the runner-up with a time of 31:13. She ran in the 15K race at the Istanbul Eurasia Marathon competition and won with a minute to spare over runner-up Belaynesh Oljira. She returned to the grassy Spanish circuit in November but was defeated by a large margin at the Cross de Atapuerca by Genzebe Dibaba.

She missed the chance to defend her World Cross title in 2011 as she failed to finish at the Kenyan Cross Country Championships. She returned to defend her title at the Freihofer's Run for Women in June, but ended the race in third behind Ethiopians Mamitu Daska and Aheza Kiros. She was sixth at the Prague Half Marathon, setting a time of 1:12:00 hours for her debut outing over the distance. Chebet competed in South America for the first time at the Bogota Half Marathon in August and took third place on the podium. She ran one of the fastest 10K times of the year as runner-up at the Tilburg 10K, but her run of 31:18 minutes was still some way behind the winner Joyce Chepkirui. In November, she returned to train in Kenya and won the Tuskys Wareng Cross Country race.

=== Second world title ===
Chebet took the bronze medal and team title with Kenya at the 2012 African Cross Country Championships held in Cape Town. A knee injury ruled her out of the track and field season that year, but she returned in August and had runner-up finishes at the Falmouth Road Race, Beach to Beacon 10K and the Tilburg 10K (setting a best of 30:58 minutes at the latter).

She placed fourth at the national cross country trials but went on to win her second world title at the 2013 IAAF World Cross Country Championships, beating off a challenge from Hiwot Ayalew to claim both the individual and team gold medals. In June she won her second title at the Freihofer's Women's Run. A runner-up placing at the Kenyan trials earned her selection for the 10,000 m at the 2013 World Championships in Athletics and she came close to a medal by running a personal best of 30:47.02 minutes, taking fourth place. She ended the track season with a 5000 m best of 14:46.89 minutes at the Weltklasse Zürich meet. Moving on to the roads, she was runner-up at the Prague Grand Prix and the Valencia Half Marathon, setting another best of 68:20 minutes at the latter event.

She is managed by Prague-based International Athletics Consultancy (IAC), with her IAAF Authorized Athletes' Representative being Zane Branson.

On 27 November 2015, Athletics Kenya announced that Chebet had used a WADA forbidden substance, the masking agent Furosemide, and she was sanctioned with a four-year competition ban, effective 15 July 2015.

== Personal bests ==
- 1500 metres – 4:18.75 min (2005)
- 3000 metres – 8:53.46 min (2005)
- 5,000 metres – 14:46.89 min (2013)
- 10,000 metres – 30:47.02 min (2013)
- 10 km – 30:58 min (2012)
- Half marathon – 1:08:20 hrs (2013)

== Achievements ==
Year	Competition	Venue	Position	Event	Notes
Representing Kenya
2003	World Cross Country Championships	Lausanne, Switzerland	5th	Junior race	
2003	World Cross Country Championships	Lausanne, Switzerland	2nd	Junior team	
2006	African Championships	Bambous, Mauritius	3rd	10,000 m	31:33.39
2007	World Cross Country Championships	Mombasa, Kenya	—	Senior race	DNF
2007	World Championships in Athletics	Osaka, Japan	9th	10,000 m	32:31.21
2010	World Cross Country Championships	Bydgoszcz, Poland	1st	Senior race	
2010	World Cross Country Championships	Bydgoszcz, Poland	1st	Team race	
2013	World Cross Country Championships	Bydgoszcz, Poland	1st	Senior race	24:24
2013	World Cross Country Championships	Bydgoszcz, Poland	1st	Team race	
2013	World Championships	Moscow, Russia	4th	10,000 m	30:47.02 PB
2014	Commonwealth Games	Glasgow, United Kingdom	3rd	10,000 m	32:10.82
