= Merima Denboba =

Ethiopian long-distance runner (born 1974)

Medal record

Women's athletics

Representing Ethiopia

African Championships
Silver medal – second place	1993 Durban	3000 m
Bronze medal – third place	1998 Dakar	5000 m
Bronze medal – third place	2000 Algiers	5000 m

Merima Denboba (born 21 August 1974 in Arsi) is an Ethiopian former long-distance runner, who specialized in the 5000 metres and cross-country running.

Denboba won the 2003 Oeiras International Cross Country, beating two-time champion Leah Malot in the process. She also won the Cross Internacional de Itálica that year, and returned for a second victory in 2004. Medina now coaches the track and field team of Seattle Preparatory School.

== International competitions ==
Year	Competition	Venue	Position	Event	Notes
Representing Ethiopia
1991	World Cross Country Championships	Antwerp, Belgium	18th	Long race (6.425 km)	21:09
1991	World Cross Country Championships	Antwerp, Belgium	2nd	Team competition	36 pts
1992	World Cross Country Championships	Boston, United States	20th	Long race (6.37 km)	22:02
1992	World Cross Country Championships	Boston, United States	3rd	Team competition	96 pts
1992	World Junior Championships	Seoul, South Korea	5th	10,000 m	33:57.21
1993	World Cross Country Championships	Amorebieta, Spain	19th	Long race (6.35 km)	20:36
1993	World Cross Country Championships	Amorebieta, Spain	6th	Team competition	122 pts
1993	African Championships	Durban, South Africa	2nd	3000 m	9:14.48
1994	World Cross Country Championships	Budapest, Hungary	4th	Long race (6.22 km)	20:57
1994	World Cross Country Championships	Budapest, Hungary	2nd	Team competition	65 pts
1995	World Cross Country Championships	Durham, United Kingdom	7th	Long race (6.47 km)	20:53
1995	World Cross Country Championships	Durham, United Kingdom	2nd	Team competition	38 pts
1997	World Cross Country Championships	Turin, Italy	6th	Long race (6.6 km)	21:18
1997	World Cross Country Championships	Turin, Italy	1st	Team competition	24 pts
1997	World Championships	Athens, Greece	10th	5000 m	15:27.76
1998	World Cross Country Championships	Marrakesh, Morocco	4th	Long race (8 km)	25:56
1998	World Cross Country Championships	Marrakesh, Morocco	2nd	Team competition	37 pts
1998	African Championships	Dakar, Senegal	3rd	5000 m	16:11.16
1999	World Cross Country Championships	Belfast, United Kingdom	2nd	Long race (8.012 km)	28:12
1999	World Cross Country Championships	Belfast, United Kingdom	1st	Team competition	18 pts
2000	World Cross Country Championships	Vilamoura, Portugal	8th	Long race (8.08 km)	26:23
2000	World Cross Country Championships	Vilamoura, Portugal	1st	Team competition	20 pts
2000	African Championships	Algiers, Algeria	3rd	5000 m	15:53.68
2001	World Cross Country Championships	Ostend, Belgium	4th	Short race (4.1 km)	15:04
2001	World Cross Country Championships	Ostend, Belgium	1st	Team competition	26 pts
2001	World Cross Country Championships	Ostend, Belgium	8th	Long race (7.7 km)	28:52
2001	World Cross Country Championships	Ostend, Belgium	2nd	Team competition	70 pts
2001	World Championships	Edmonton, Canada	13th	5000 m	15:41.09
2002	World Cross Country Championships	Dublin, Ireland	6th	Long race (7.974 km)	27:21
2002	World Cross Country Championships	Dublin, Ireland	1st	Team competition	28 pts
2003	World Cross Country Championships	Lausanne, Switzerland	6th	Short race (4.03 km)	12:52
2003	World Cross Country Championships	Lausanne, Switzerland	2nd	Team competition	24 pts
2003	World Cross Country Championships	Lausanne, Switzerland	3rd	Long race (7.92 km)	26:28
2003	World Cross Country Championships	Lausanne, Switzerland	2nd	Team competition	17 pts

== Personal bests ==
- 1500 metres – 4:14.60 min (1994)
- 3000 metres – 8:44.21 min (1999)
- 5000 metres – 15:06.08 min (2001)
- 10,000 metres – 31:32.63 min (1999)
- Half marathon – 1:11:37 hrs (2005)
- Marathon – 2:32:54 hrs (2007)
