= Tereza Yohannes =

Ethiopian long-distance runner

Tereza Yohannes (born 1982 in Shoa) is an Ethiopian long-distance runner.

At the 2003 World Cross Country Championships she finished ninth in the long race, while the Ethiopian team, of which Yohannes was a part, won the gold medal in the team competition.

== Personal bests ==
- 3000 metres – 9:13.24 min (2002)
- 5000 metres – 15:45.04 min (2001)
- 10,000 metres – 33:04.73 min (2000)
- Half marathon – 1:13:38 hrs (1999)
