= Magdaline Chemjor =

Kenyan long-distance runner

Magdaline Jepkorir Chemjor (born 12 November 1978) is a Kenyan long-distance runner.

At the 2003 World Cross Country Championships Chemjor finished fifth in the long race, while the Kenyan team, of which Chemjor was a part, won the silver medal in the team competition. She participated in the World Half Marathon Championships in 2001 and 2003. She also won the 2003 Berlin Half Marathon.

== Achievements ==
Year	Competition	Venue	Position	Event	Notes
Representing Kenya
2001	Marseille-Cassis Classique Internationale	Marseille, France	1st	Half Marathon	1:09:52
2007	Amsterdam Marathon	Amsterdam, Netherlands	1st	Marathon	2:28:16

== Personal bests ==
- 5000 metres - 16:00.77 min (1999)
- Half marathon - 1:09:39 hrs (2003)
