= Hicham Chatt =

Moroccan long-distance runner (born 1969)

Medal record

Men's athletics

World Cross Country Championships
Bronze medal – third place	2003 Lausanne	Long race – Team

Hicham Chatt (born 18 February 1969) is a Moroccan long-distance runner who specialized in the marathon and cross-country running.

He finished eighth in the long race at the 2003 World Cross Country Championships, and twelfth in 2004. For this he won a bronze medal with the Moroccan team in the team competition in 2003. In 2004, the team finished fourth. He won the Cross de Atapuerca meeting in 2006. Chatt also competed in the marathon at the 2007 World Championships without finishing the race.

His personal best marathon time is 2:07:59 hours, achieved in April 2006 in the London Marathon. He has 28:21.48 minutes in the 10,000 metres, achieved in May 2004 in Hengelo.

== Achievements ==
Year	Competition	Venue	Position	Event	Notes
Representing Morocco
2007	World Championships	Osaka, Japan	—	Marathon	DNF
