= Soumiya Labani =

Moroccan long-distance runner

Personal information
- Born: February 3, 1975 (age 51)
- Height: 1.68 m (5 ft 6 in)
- Weight: 54 kg (119 lb)

Sport
- Country: Morocco
- Sport: Athletics
- Event: Marathon

Soumiya Labani (born 3 February 1975 in Safi) is a Moroccan long-distance runner, winner of the 23rd edition of the Marrakech Marathon with a time of 2:34:56. Soumiya competed in the marathon at the 2012 Summer Olympics but did not finish the race.

== Doping ==
Labani tested positive for doping at the 2003 IAAF World Cross Country Championships in Lausanne and received a two-year ban.
