= Jane Wanjiku =

Kenyan long-distance runner

Jane Wanjiku Gakunyi (born 14 June 1979) is a Kenyan long-distance runner.

At the 2003 World Cross Country Championships she finished third in the short race, while the Kenyan team, of which Wanjiku was a part, won the team competition. She finished ninth at the 2004 World Cross Country Championships, but this was not enough to win a medal with the team.

She is not to be confused with Jane Wanjiku Ngotho, a Kenyan runner and world junior champion from 1988.

== Personal bests ==
- 1500 metres - 4:15.01 min (2005)
- 3000 metres - 8:45.97 min (2006)
- 5000 metres - 15:04.00 min (2003)
- 10,000 metres - 31:04.34 min (2004)
- Half marathon - 1:10:03 hrs (2006)
