= Werknesh Kidane =

Ethiopian long-distance runner

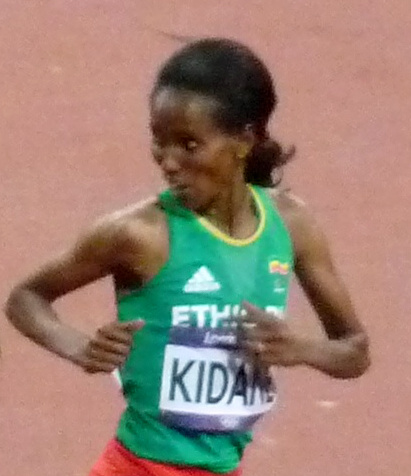
- Werknesh Kidane at the 2012 Summer Olympics

Medal record

Women's athletics

Representing Ethiopia

World Championships
Silver medal – second place	2003 Paris	10,000 m

World Cross Country Championships
Gold medal – first place	2003 Lausanne	Long race
Silver medal – second place	2002 Dublin	Short race
Silver medal – second place	2003 Lausanne	Short race
Silver medal – second place	2005 Saint-Galmier	Short race
Bronze medal – third place	2004 Brussels	Long race
Bronze medal – third place	2005 Saint-Galmier	Long race

Werknesh Kidane (Amharic: ወርቅነሽ ኪዳነ; born November 21, 1981) is an Ethiopian long-distance runner from Tigray who competes in both 5000 and 10,000 metres. She has won numerous medals at the IAAF World Cross Country Championships and represented Ethiopia at the Summer Olympics in 2000, 2004 and 2012. She was the silver medallist at the 2005 World Championships in Athletics and a gold medallist at the 2003 IAAF World Cross Country Championships.

== Biography ==
She was born in the historic town of Maychew, Tigray, and her first international title came at the 1999 IAAF World Cross Country Championships where she topped the podium in the junior race. She made her Olympic debut as a teenager and came seventh in the 5000 m final at the 2000 Sydney Olympics. She won the 2002 Great Ethiopian Run and came second in the short race at the 2002 IAAF World Cross Country Championships.

Werknesh began her 2003 season with a win at the Antrim International Cross Country and then went on to take the women's long race title at the 2003 IAAF World Cross Country Championships. She won the silver medal in the 10,000 m at the 2003 All-Africa Games, finishing behind fellow Ethiopian Ejegayehu Dibaba. Her season peaked at the 2003 World Championships in Athletics where she set a 10,000 m personal best of 30:07.15 minutes to secure the runner-up position behind Ethiopian veteran Berhane Adere who broke the African record for the event. The following year she came fourth in the event at the 2004 Athens Olympics. She also won the long race bronze medal at the 2004 IAAF World Cross Country Championships, as well as taking fourth in the short race.

She had a success campaign on the 2004/05 cross country circuit in Spain, winning in Soria, Valle de Llodio and Seville. At the 2005 IAAF World Cross Country Championships she took second place in the short race and third in the long race, taking the team titles with Tirunesh Dibaba in both races. She took part in the 2005 World Championships in Athletics but could not repeat her podium feat of two years earlier, finishing in sixth in the 10,000 m.

Werknesh returned to international competition after a long break at the 2010 IAAF World Cross Country Championships and came in ninth place in the senior race. She made her first top-level road race attempt at the 2010 Great Manchester Run and won with a personal best time of 32:31 minutes. She ran at the NYRR New York Mini 10K in June 2010, and finished in third place behind Kenyans Linet Masai and Emily Chebet. She continued on the US road circuit with a performance at the Philadelphia Half Marathon, where she was third in a time of 1:08:30.

She made her marathon debut in the 2011 Boston Marathon, where she placed seventh with a time of 2:26:15. The following year she ran at the Carlsbad 5000 and was runner-up behind Tirunesh Dibaba. At the 2012 Summer Olympics, she finished fourth in the 10,000m again. She was a late entry at the Carlsbad 5000 in 2015 (wearing the name "Werky" on her bib), representing Adidas, and placed 11th with a time of 16:00 flat.

She lives in USA since becoming a US resident. Her parents live in Axum, Tigray. She stands 1.58 m / 5'2" tall and is coached by Kassu Alemayehu and Dr Woldemeskel Kostre when she is running for the Ethiopian National Team. Her manager is Mark Wetmore of Global Athletics & Marketing. Werknesh is married to Gebregziabher Gebremariam.
