= Viktoriya Klimina =

Russian long-distance runner

Viktoriya Klimina (Russian: Виктория Климина; born 1 March 1976) is a Russian long-distance runner.

She finished sixteenth at the 2001 IAAF World Half Marathon Championships and 22nd in the marathon at the 2003 World Championships.

At the 2003 World Cross Country Championships she finished 34th in the short race, while the Russian team of which Klimina was a part won the bronze medal in the team competition.

She later improved to seventeenth place in the long course at the 2005 World Cross Country Championships, but that was not enough to win a team medal.

== International competitions ==
Representing Russia
Year	Competition	Venue	Position	Event	Result	Notes
2003	World Championships	Paris, France	22nd	Marathon	2:31:45	

== Personal bests ==
- 3000 metres - 8:58.53 min (2005)
- 5000 metres - 15:55.23 min (2000)
- 10,000 metres - 31:56.07 min (2005)
- Half marathon - 1:09:54 hrs (2004)
- Marathon - 2:28:30 hrs (2002)
