= Thomas Kiplitany =

Kenyan long-distance runner

Thomas Kiplitany (born 15 June 1983) is a Kenyan long-distance runner.

At the 2003 World Cross Country Championships he finished fifth in the short race, while the Kenyan team, of which Kiplitany was a part, won the gold medal in the team competition.

== Personal bests ==
- 3000 metres - 7:51.07 min (2002)
- 3000 metres steeplechase - 8:12.91 min (2002)
- 10,000 metres - 27:32.30 min (2004)
- Marathon - 2:10:05 hrs (2006)
