= Abderrahim Goumri =

Moroccan long-distance runner (1976–2013)

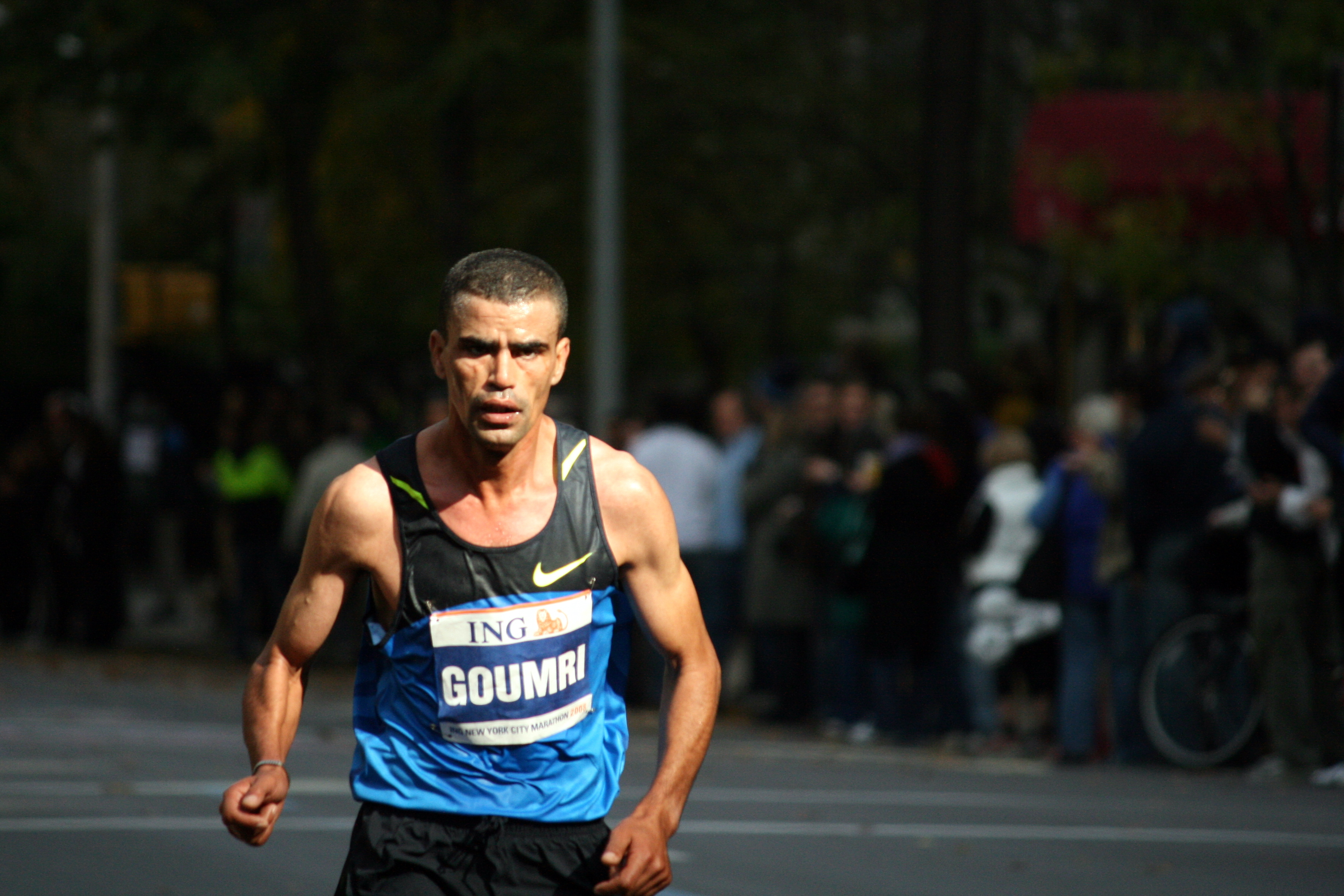
- Goumri at the 2008 New York City Marathon

Personal information
- Born: 21 May 1976
- Died: 19 January 2013 (aged 36)

Abderrahim Goumri (Arabic: عبد الرحيم الغومري; 21 May 1976 – 19 January 2013 in Temara, Morocco) was a Moroccan long-distance runner. He had competed in cross country, track, road running and marathon races.

He spent the early part of his career in Norway and established himself with performances at the IAAF World Cross Country Championships, where he helped his nation to team bronze medals at the 2002 and 2003 editions. He reached the 5000 metres track finals at the 2003 World Championships and the 2004 Summer Olympics. In 2005 he ran a career best of 12:50.25 minutes for the distance to take eleventh place on the all-time lists.

From 2007 onwards he focused on marathon running and was runner-up at both the London and New York races that year. He set a Moroccan record of 2:05:30 hours for third at the 2008 London Marathon, becoming the sixth fastest marathoner at that point. He was the runner-up at the 2008 New York Marathon and the 2009 Chicago Marathon. In spite of good performances at major races on the circuit, he did not perform well in the event at the championships—finishing twentieth at the 2008 Beijing Olympics and failing to finish at the World Championships in 2007, 2009 and 2011.

On 7 June 2012, the International Association of Athletics Federations (IAAF) announced that Goumri was provisionally suspended on the basis of abnormal blood values in his "biological passport." The French newspaper L'Équipe reported that the IAAF was recommending a suspension of two to four years for the doping offense. He received a four-year suspension.

Goumri died on 19 January 2013 in a car crash in Temara, Morocco while en route to Rabat.

== Career ==
=== Early competitions ===
Initially running for the prestigious Olympique de Safi club, Goumri's first international appearance for Morocco came as a junior at the 1995 IAAF World Cross Country Championships, where he came 25th and shared in the bronze junior team medal. Early on in his career, he was based in Norway. He ran at the Tromsø Midnight Sun Marathon 1997 and won in a time of 2:30:54 hours. In 1999, he won the Norwegian championships in both 1500 metres and 5000 metres. Like his fellow countryman Khalid Skah, who won the Norwegian 5000 m championships in 1997, 1998 and 2000, Goumri represented the athletics club IL i BUL. He took consecutive wins at the Eurocross meeting in Luxembourg, having taken the title in 2000 and 2001.

He focused on track running in 2001: he was part of a Moroccan sweep of the medals in the 5000 m at the Jeux de la Francophonie (taking silver)., later running in the 10,000 metres final at the 2001 World Championships in Athletics. He closed his track season with a tenth-place finish in the 3000 metres at the 2001 IAAF Grand Prix Final.

He proved himself as a versatile performer over the following seasons, competing on various surfaces and distances. He was seventh in the long race at the 2002 IAAF World Cross Country Championships (helping Morocco to the team bronze) and narrowly missed out on a 10,000 m medal with a fourth-place finish at the 2002 African Championships in Athletics. His tenth and fifteenth position finishes in the short and long race of the 2003 IAAF World Cross Country Championships brought two further team bronze medals for Morocco. He also performed well on the track, coming ninth over 3000 metres at the 2003 IAAF World Indoor Championships and then tenth outdoors in the 5000 m at the 2003 World Championships in Athletics. That October he came twelfth at the 2003 IAAF World Half Marathon Championships, aiding his country to fourth in the team rankings.

=== Olympic debut ===
Goumri improved one place to 14th in the long race at the 2004 IAAF World Cross Country Championships, but the Moroccans were edged into fourth by the Eritrean team. Track became his focus that year and he made his Olympic debut in August, reaching the 5000 m final at the 2004 Athens Olympics and ending the race in 13th place. He was ninth at the 2004 IAAF World Athletics Final, but gained a medal on the regional stage as he took the silver behind Khoudir Aggoune at the Pan Arab Games. Eighteenth in the short race at the 2005 IAAF World Cross Country Championships, he and his teammates Adil Kaouch, Mohamed Moustaoui and Hicham Bellani were again the fourth best (beaten this time by Qatar).

He set a personal best for the 10,000 m in May, running a time of 27:02.62 minutes, and came eighth in the event final at that year's World Championships. He scored another track career best at the Memorial van Damme in August with a time of 12:50.25 minutes for the 5000 m – a mark which ranked him eleventh on the all-time lists behind Hicham El Guerrouj. However, this form did not translate to the 3000 m, which he ran at the 2005 IAAF World Athletics Final and managed only tenth overall. The 2005 Jeux de la Francophonie was his year-ending competition and he opted for the 10,000 m, securing a silver behind the Rwandan Dieudonné Disi.

In 2006 he had his last year running on the track, but managed a career best indoors over the 5000 m (13:29.55) in Stockholm that February. He continued having success at the 2006 IAAF World Cross Country Championships as he was eleventh in the long race, completing the race as the first non-East African finisher. He began to make a transition to road running and at the end of the year he claimed a victory at the BOclassic 10 km.

=== Transition to marathon ===
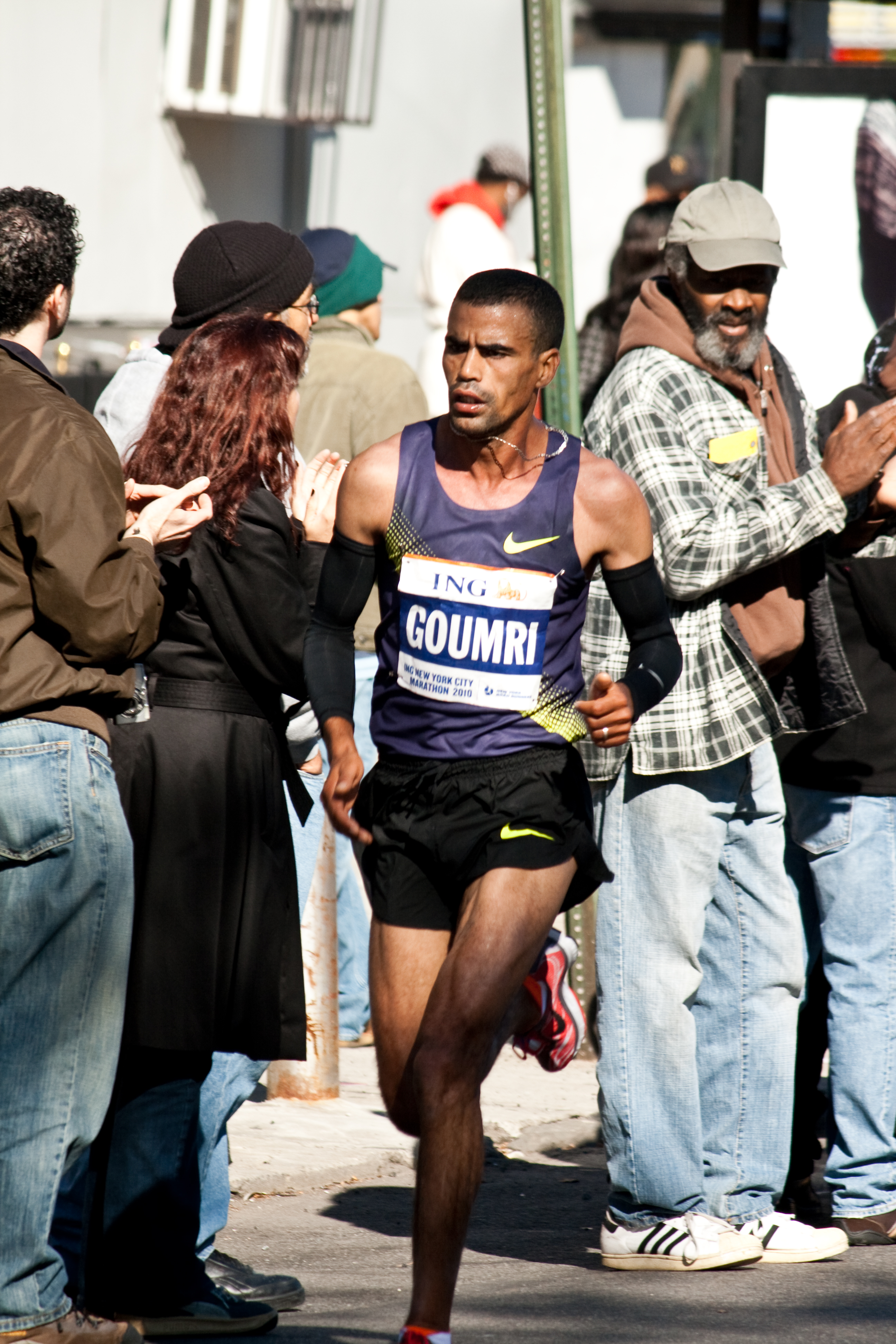
Goumri running at the 2010 New York City Marathon

Despite the fact that Goumri was 21st at the 2007 IAAF World Cross Country Championships, a strong overall team performance (including Anis Selmouni and Ahmed Baday) brought him his first team silver medal at the event. Goumri had a very successful return to the marathon (his first since 1997) at the 2007 London Marathon, finishing second in 2:07:44, just three seconds behind Martin Lel. He competed in his new speciality at the 2007 World Championships in Athletics, but did not manage to finish the race. Goumri looked to make amends for that performance by signing up for the New York City Marathon. Just as in London, the race came down to a battle between Lel and the Moroccan, and history repeated itself as the Kenyan sprinted ahead to win while Goumri settled for second (recording a time of 2:09:16).

In an exceptionally fast race at the 2008 London Marathon, Goumri ended the race in third but still set a Moroccan national record of 2:05:30 to become the sixth fastest ever over the distance. He ran at the 2008 Beijing Olympics but again he faltered on the championship stage, ending the race in 20th almost ten minutes off his best. New York was again a venue for redemption and, although he controlled the race from the front in the latter stages, he faded in the final stretch and allowed Marilson Gomes Dos Santos to beat him into second place.

At the 2009 London Marathon, he was sixth and there was no improvement at the 2009 World Championships in Athletics, where he again dropped out of the race. He ran a tempered race at the 2009 Chicago Marathon and his decision to ignore the fast opening pace paid off, as he overhauled all but Samuel Wanjiru and recorded his second fastest ever time with 2:06:04. Goumri placed third at the 2010 Philadelphia Half Marathon in September. Two months later he ran at the 2010 New York City Marathon and came fourth, ten seconds adrift of third-placer Moses Kigen Kipkosgei.

He began 2011 with his first run in Asia at the Seoul International Marathon in March and he saw off defending champion Sylvester Teimet to win the race in a time of 2:09:11 hours.

== Death ==
Abderrahim Goumri died on 19 January 2013 in a car crash in Temara, Morocco, while en route to Rabat. He was 36.

== Achievements ==
Year	Competition	Venue	Position	Event	Notes
Representing Morocco
2001	Jeux de la Francophonie	Ottawa, Canada	2nd	5000 m	
2001	World Championships	Edmonton, Canada	16th	10,000 m	
2002	World Cross Country Championships	Dublin, Ireland	7th	Long race	
2002	World Cross Country Championships	Dublin, Ireland	3rd	Team	
2002	African Championships	Radès, Tunisia	4th	10,000 m	
2003	World Cross Country Championships	Lausanne, Switzerland	10th	Short race	
2003	World Cross Country Championships	Lausanne, Switzerland	3rd	Team	
2003	World Cross Country Championships	Lausanne, Switzerland	15th	Long race	
2003	World Cross Country Championships	Lausanne, Switzerland	3rd	Team	
2003	World Indoor Championships	Birmingham, England	9th	3000 m	
2003	World Championships	Paris, France	10th	5000 m	
2003	World Half Marathon Championships	Vilamoura, Portugal	12th	Half marathon	
2004	World Cross Country Championships	Brussels, Belgium	14th	Long race	
2004	World Cross Country Championships	Brussels, Belgium	4th	Team	
2004	Olympic Games	Athens, Greece	13th	5000 m	
2004	World Athletics Final	Monte Carlo, Monaco	9th	5000 m	
2004	Pan Arab Games	Algiers, Algeria	2nd	5000 m	
2005	World Cross Country Championships	Saint-Étienne, France	18th	Short race	
2005	World Cross Country Championships	Saint-Étienne, France	4th	Team	
2005	World Championships	Helsinki, Finland	8th	10,000 m	
2005	World Athletics Final	Monte Carlo, Monaco	10th	3000 m	
2005	Jeux de la Francophonie	Niamey, Niger	2nd	10,000 m	
2006	World Cross Country Championships	Fukuoka, Japan	11th	Long race	
2006	World Cross Country Championships	Fukuoka, Japan	4th	Team	
2007	World Cross Country Championships	Mombasa, Kenya	21st	Senior race	
2007	World Cross Country Championships	Mombasa, Kenya	2nd	Team	
2007	World Championships	Osaka, Japan	—	Marathon	DNF
2008	Olympic Games	Beijing, China	20th	Marathon	
2009	World Championships	Berlin, Germany	—	Marathon	DNF
2009	Chicago Marathon	Chicago, United States	2nd	Marathon	2:06:04

=== Personal bests ===
- 1500 metres – 3:39.80 min (1998)
- 3000 metres – 7:32.36 min (2001)
- 5000 metres – 12:50.25 min (2005)
- 10,000 metres – 27:02.62 min (2005)
- Half Marathon – 1:01:19 hrs (2001)
- Marathon – 2:05:30 hrs (2008; former Moroccan record)
