= Abdelhakim Maazouz =

Algerian middle-distance runner

Personal information
- Nationality: Algerian
- Born: 22 August 1975 (age 51)

Sport
- Sport: Middle-distance running
- Event: Steeplechase

Abdelhakim Maazouz (born 22 August 1975) is an Algerian middle-distance runner. He competed in the men's 3000 metres steeplechase at the 2004 Summer Olympics.
