= Anastasiya Zubova =

Russian long-distance runner (born 1979)

Anastasiya Zubova (born 6 August 1979) is a retired Russian long-distance runner.

She finished 30th at the 2003 World Cross Country Championships in the short race, while the Russian team, of which Zubova was a part, won the bronze medal in the team competition. She had finished fourteenth at the 2001 World Cross Country Championships, but that was not enough to win a team medal.

== Personal bests ==
- 3000 metres - 8:54.67 min (2002)
- 5000 metres - 15:32.01 min (2002)
