= Abiyote Endale =

Ethiopian long-distance runner

Abiyot Endale (born 1986) is an Ethiopian long-distance runner. At the 2003 World Cross Country Championships he finished thirteenth in the short race, while the Ethiopian team, of which Endale was a part, won the silver medal in the team competition.

== Personal bests ==
- 5000 metres - 13:39.83 min (2003)

He lives in Bronx, NY and runs for the Westchester Track Club coached by Mike Barnow. Endale also mentors younger runners in Westchester Track Club (WTC) workshops for grade school age developing runners.
