= Olga Romanova (athlete) =

Russian long-distance runner

Olga Romanova (Russian: Ольга Романова; born 23 May 1980) is a Russian long-distance runner.

At the 2003 World Cross Country Championships she finished fourteenth in the short race, while the Russian team, of which Romanova was a part, won the bronze medal in the team competition. She had finished fourteenth at the 2002 World Cross Country Championships, and later finished sixth at the 2004 World Cross Country Championships, both times without winning a team medal.

== Personal bests ==
- 3000 metres - 8:54.67 min (2002)
- 5000 metres - 15:32.59 min (2001)
- 10,000 metres - 32:28.91 min (2003)
- Half marathon - 1:12:11 hrs (2003)
- Marathon - 2:39:49 hrs (2003)
