= Marrakech Marathon =

Road running event in Morocco

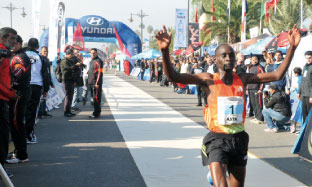
- Date: late January
- Location: Marrakesh
- Event type: Road running
- Distance: Marathon
- Established: 1987
- Course records: Men: 2:06:32 (Morocco) Hicham Laqouahi (2020); Women: 2:24:59 (Morocco) Fatima Ezzahra Gardadi (2022)
- Website: Marrakech Marathon
- Participants: 1,383 (2020); 1,134 (2019)

The Marrakech Marathon is an annual marathon held in Marrakesh, Morocco. Roughly 5000 runners turn out for the event annually.

At the inaugural edition of the race in 1987 French runner Jacques Boxberger won the men's race while the women's race was won by a Moroccan 14-year-old Nadia Ouaziz-Colombero – whose win made her one of the youngest ever winners of an international level marathon.

== Past winners ==
Key: Course record

Edition	Year	Men's winner	Time (h:m:s)	Women's winner	Time (h:m:s)
1st	1987	Jacky Boxberger (FRA)	2:14:58	Nadia Ouaziz-Colombero (MAR)	?
2nd	1988	Thomas Hughes (NIR)	2:15:48	Carolyn Naisby (ENG)	2:41:35
3rd	1989	Jean Weijts (BEL)	2:15:49	Janis Klecker (USA)	2:39:19
4th	1990	Jan Huruk (POL)	2:14:29	Martine van de Gehuchte (BEL)	2:42:15
5th	1991	Osmiro Silva (BRA)	2:09:55	Izabela Zatorska (POL)	2:38:05
6th	1992	Mukhamet Nazipov (RUS)	2:12:40	Izabela Zatorska (POL)	2:36:29
7th	1993	Chaham El Maati (MAR)	2:11:55	Tammy Slusser (USA)	2:38:01
8th	1994	Mukhamet Nazipov (RUS)	2:12:05	Adriana Barbu (ROM)	2:29:21
9th	1995	Abdelillah Zerdal (MAR)	2:11:50	Cristina Pomacu (ROM)	2:34:21
10th	1996	Abdelkader El Mouaziz (MAR)	2:09:50	Fatuma Roba (ETH)	2:30:50
11th	1997	Abdelkader El Mouaziz (MAR)	2:09:50	Alina Gherasim (ROM)	2:29:52
—	1998	—		—	
12th	1999	Abdelkader El Mouaziz (MAR)	2:08:15	Cristina Costea (ROM)	2:29:53
—	2000	—		—	
—	2001	—		—	
13th	2002	Kamel Saaidou (MAR)	2:14:56	Ionela Vasile (ROM)	2:45:46
14th	2003	Abdelfattah Aïtzouri (MAR)	2:12:15	Elena Deryabina (RUS)	2:41:55
15th	2004	Khalid El-Boumlili (MAR)	2:10:49	Hafida Narmouch (MAR)	2:43:11
16th	2005	Abderrahime Bouramdane (MAR)	2:15:16	Hafida Narmouch (MAR)	2:40:58
17th	2006	Noureddine Jalel (MAR)	2:14:30	Alina Gherasim (ROM)	2:43:49
18th	2007	Sammy Chumba (KEN)	2:11:43	Alina Gherasim (ROM)	2:39:52
19th	2008	Siyoum Lemma (ETH)	2:10:48	Yeshi Esayias (ETH)	2:35:40
20th	2009	David Rutoh (KEN)	2:10:31	Yeshi Esayias (ETH)	2:29:52
21st	2010	Yared Dagnaw (ERI)	2:10:20	Tsega Gelaw (ETH)	2:32:09
22nd	2011	Gezahgn Girma (ETH)	2:10:22	Debola Wudnesh (ETH)	2:37:00
23rd	2012	Stephen Tum (KEN)	2:08:51	Soumiya Labani (MAR)	2:34:56
24th	2013	Stephen Tum (KEN)	2:06:35	Gulume Tollesa (ETH)	2:36:05
25th	2014	Deribe Robi (ETH)	2:08:04	Meseret Kitata (ETH)	2:31:08
26th	2015	Workneh Tesfa (ETH)	2:08:51	Worknesh Edesa (ETH)	2:31:06
27th	2016	Moses Mbugua (KEN)	2:11:41	Shasho Insermu (ETH)	2:32:42
28th	2017	Gebretsadik Abraha (ETH)	2:08:55	Ashu Kasim (ETH)	2:30:18
29th	2018	Wycliffe Biwott (KEN)	2:11:04	Tinbit Weldegebriel (ETH)	2:26:48
30th	2019	Fikadu Girma (ETH)	2:08:43	Mulunesh Zewdu (ETH)	2:29:57
31st	2020	Hicham Laqouahi (MAR)	2:06:32	Hawi Alemu (ETH)	2:27:56
32nd	2022	Bonsa Dida (ETH)	2:09:34	Fatima Ezzahra Gardadi (MAR)	2:24:58
33rd	2023	Kibel Gilbert (KEN)	2:09:48	Kaltoum Bouasarya (MAR)	2:27:22
34th	2024	Sammy Kitwara (KEN)	2:07:53	Kaoutar Farkoussi (MAR)	2:27:58
35th	2025	Alfonce Kigen Kibiwott (KEN)	2:08:47	Tirfi Tsegaye (ETH)	2:25:44
36th	2026	Abdelhadi Labäli (MAR)	2:07:34	Hayat Benhima (MAR)	2:24:48
