= Khalid El Aamri =

Moroccan runner

Khalid El Aamri (born 20 March 1977) is a Moroccan runner. He specializes in cross-country running.

== International competitions ==
Year	Competition	Venue	Position	Notes
2002	World Cross Country Championships	Dublin, Ireland	9th	Short race
2003	World Cross Country Championships	Lausanne, Switzerland	10th	Long race
2003	World Cross Country Championships	Lausanne, Switzerland	3rd	Team competition
2003	World Cross Country Championships	Lausanne, Switzerland	6th	Short race
2003	World Cross Country Championships	Lausanne, Switzerland	3rd	Team competition
2006	World Cross Country Championships	Fukuoka, Japan	15th	Short race
2006	World Cross Country Championships	Fukuoka, Japan	3rd	Team competition
2006	World Athletics Final	Stuttgart, Germany	11th	3000 m

== Personal bests ==
- 1500 metres - 3:38.99 (2006)
- 3000 metres - 7:34.77 (2006)
- 5000 metres - 13:06.13 (2006)
- 10,000 metres - 27:26.24 (2005)
