= Anália Rosa =

Portuguese long-distance runner

Anália de Oliveira Rosa (born 28 February 1976) is a Portuguese long-distance runner who competes in cross country, track and road running events, including the marathon. She has represented Portugal at the IAAF World Cross Country Championships a total of nine times.

== Biography ==
Rosa was born in Troviscal, Oliveira do Bairro. She began her career as a cross country specialist. She won the 2000 World Student Cross Country Championships and established herself on the senior national scene as well, taking three straight short course titles from 2000 to 2003. She made her major international debut at the 2000 IAAF World Cross Country Championships in Vilamoura, running in the short race. She switched to the long race at the next edition and reached the top-fifteen runners. Over the following seasons, she made a number of other top-twenty finishes (including 11th in the long race and 16th in the short at the 2003 IAAF World Cross Country Championships). Her world cross career was highlighted by a team bronze medal at the 2005 edition, where she led the national team with a fifteenth-place finish. She also reached the top ten at the European Cross Country Championships in 2004 and 2006.

She won the 3000 metres steeplechase at the 2004 Ibero-American Championships. Among her other track performances, she reached the 3000 metres final at the 2006 IAAF World Indoor Championships, coming eighth overall. She made her marathon debut that same year (11th in Hamburg) and was tenth in the event at the 2006 European Athletics Championships in Gothenburg, recording a time of 2:32:56 hours. Rosa made her first world level appearance over the distance at the 2007 World Championships in Athletics and ended the race in 36th place. She was also that year's winner at the Chiba International Cross Country in Japan.

She did not compete for much of 2008, but ran at the end of the year at the 2008 European Cross Country Championships, where she helped the Portuguese women to the team title by finishing seventh. The following year she took 22nd at the 2009 IAAF World Cross Country Championships and 18th at the 2009 IAAF World Half Marathon Championships (setting a personal best of 1:11:08 hours for the half marathon). She won the Oeiras International Cross Country in the build-up to the 2010 European Cross Country Championships, which was hosted on home turf in Albufeira. However, she performed poorly at the continental event, managing only 32nd while five of her countrywomen were among the top ten finishers.

In January 2016, Rosa was suspended for two years by the Portuguese Athletics Federation, following a positive result in a doping control.

== See also ==
- List of doping cases in athletics
