= Ketema Nigusse =

Ethiopian long-distance runner

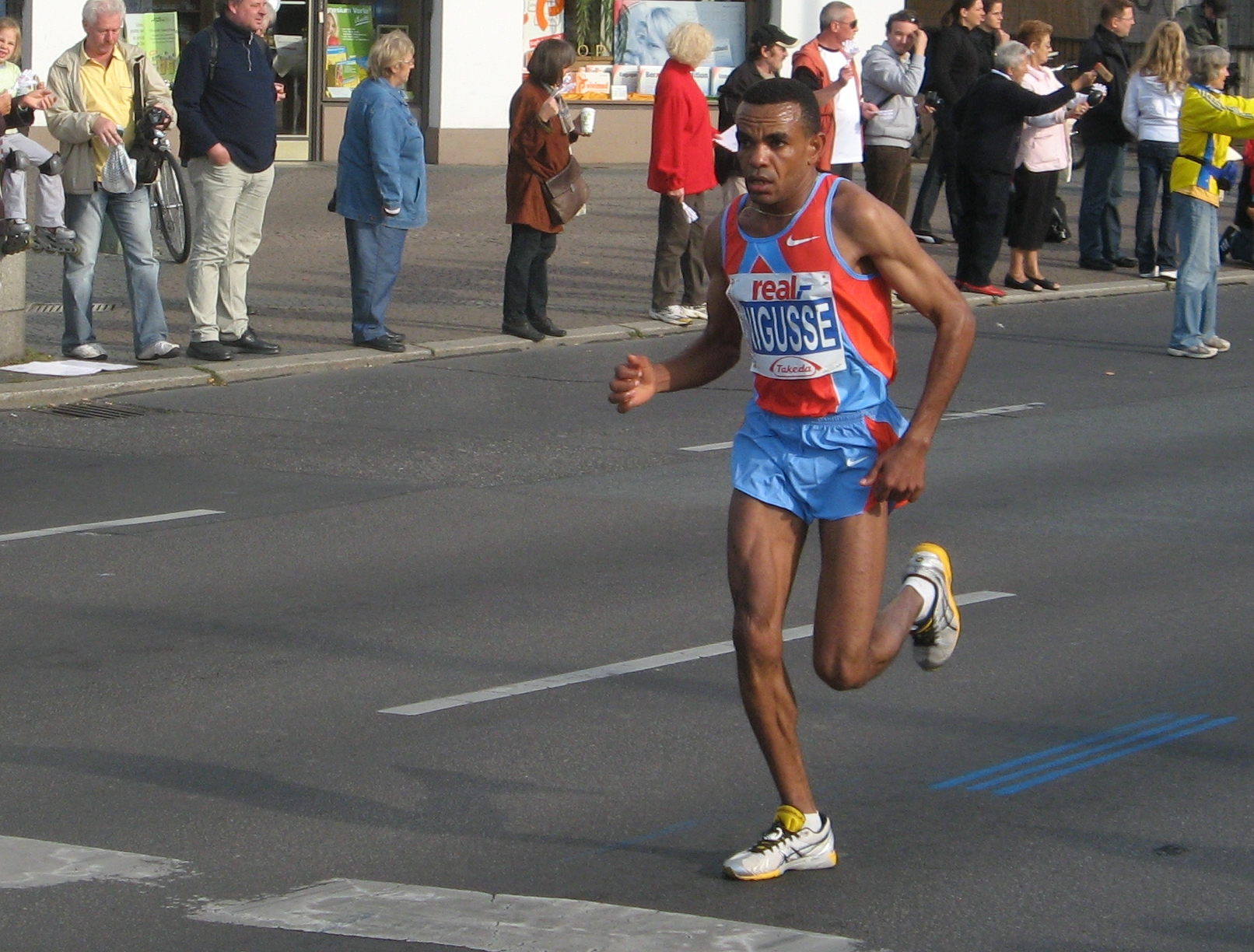
Nigusse at the Berlin Marathon 2008

Ketema Nigusse (born 29 January 1981 in Kuyu) is an Ethiopian long-distance runner who specializes in cross-country running.

At the 2003 World Cross Country Championships he finished thirteenth in the long race, while the Ethiopian team of which he was a part finished second in the team competition. He also finished seventeenth in the short race. He was lower down the ranks at the 2004 edition, placing 36th in the long race. At the 2006 World Cross Country Championships he only finished 26th in the long race, but this was good enough to be on the Ethiopian team that placed third in the team competition. In his fourth appearance at the competition in 2007 he came 17th.

Ketema's marathon debut came in 2008, when he entered the Berlin Marathon and finished with a time of 2:15:45 hours. He won the 2011 Broad Street Run (an annual 10 mile run through Philadelphia PA) He won his first marathon in 2013, topping the podium at the Pyongyang Marathon.
