= Isaac Kiprop =

Ugandan mountain runner

Personal information
- Full name: Isaac Kiprop Kipkosgei
- Nationality: Ugandan
- Born: 10 September 1986 (age 39)

Sport
- Country: Uganda
- Sport: Mountain running

Isaac Kiprop (born 10 September 1986) is a Ugandan mountain runner who won one World Mountain Running Championships (2014).
