= Peninah Jepchumba =

Kenyan long-distance runner

Peninah Jepchumba (born 14 January 1985 in Marakwet) is a Kenyan long-distance runner.

She finished seventh in 3000 metres at the 2002 World Junior Championships and won the silver medal in the junior race at the 2003 World Cross Country Championships. At the 2004 World Cross Country Championships she finished seventh in the short race, while the Kenyan team, of which Jepchumba was a part, won the silver medal in the team competition.

== Personal bests ==
- 1500 metres - 4:15.35 min (2003)
- 3000 metres - 9:10.27 min (2003)
- 5000 metres - 15:46.0 min (2001)
