= David Kilel =

Kenyan long-distance runner

David Kilel (born 21 May 1984) is a Kenyan long-distance runner.

He won a silver medal in 3000 metres at the 2001 World Youth Championships and finished eighth in the short race at the 2003 World Cross Country Championships.

== Personal bests ==
- 3000 metres - 7:42.49 min (2002)
- 5000 metres - 13:11.83 min (2004)
