= Noel Berkeley =

Irish long-distance runner

Personal information
- Nationality: Irish
- Born: 20 November 1964 (age 61)

Sport
- Sport: Long-distance running
- Event: 10,000 metres

Noel Berkeley (born 20 December 1964) is an Irish long-distance runner. He competed in the men's 10,000 metres at the 1992 Summer Olympics. He competed collegiately in the United States and attended the University of Oklahoma.
