= Belaynesh Fikadu =

Ethiopian long-distance runner

Belaynesh Fikadu (born 28 March 1987) is an Ethiopian long-distance runner who competes in road running competitions. She represented her country at the African Championships in Athletics in 2008, coming fourth. She has won the Tilburg 10K, Dam tot Damloop and International Chiba Ekiden.

Her first year of competing at the top level came in 2006: she won the Cursa de Bombers and Great Ethiopian Run 10K races and set a 5000 metres track best of 15:59.95 minutes at the Internationales Stadionfest in Berlin. She ended the year with a win at the New Year's Eve Trierer Silvesterlauf. On the roads the following year she won the Lahore 10K, the Tilburg 10K and the Dam tot Damloop 10-miler. She set a 3000 metres track best of 8:52.04 minutes at the Hanžeković Memorial, placing second, and improved her 5000 m best to 15:02.14 minutes at the FBK Games.

A successful track season came for Belaynesh in 2008 – she was fourth over 5000 m at the 2008 African Championships in Athletics, set a best of 14:46.84 minutes for third at the FBK Games, then came fourth at the Bislett Games in Oslo. She was chosen for the International Chiba Ekiden team and won her leg to help Ethiopia to the title and a course record. In 2009, she finished ninth at the Bislett Games, but still ran a personal best time of 14:44.26 minutes. Further bests came at the Tilburg 10K, where she was runner-up to Mestawet Tufa in 31:23 minutes, and the Dam tot Damloop, where she was fourth with a time of 51:40 minutes for the ten miles. Her last competitive outing was at the 2010 World's Best 10K, finishing in seventh and one place ahead of her fellow namesake Belaynesh Zemedkun. In the 2018 New York City Marathon she finished in 10th place and clocked in at a time of 2:30:47 beating her previous personal record.
