= Tessema Abshero =

Ethiopian long-distance runner (born 1986)

Tessema Abshero (Amharic: ተሠማ አብሸር; born 9 December 1986) is an Ethiopian long-distance runner.

He finished tenth in the 5000 metres at the 2002 African Championships. At the 2003 World Cross Country Championships he finished twelfth in the short race, while the Ethiopian team, of which Absher was a part, won the silver medal in the team competition.

He set a marathon best of 2:08:26 at the Hamburg Marathon in 2008 and also took part in the 2009 London Marathon.

He inspired his younger brother, Ayele Abshero, to run and Ayele became world junior champion in cross country in 2009.

== Personal bests ==
- 3000 metres – 7:44.21 (2005)
- 5000 metres – 13:23.08 (2005)
- 10,000 metres – 28:22.68 (2006)
- Half marathon – 1:02:57 (2006)
- Marathon – 2:08:26 (2008)
