= Isabella Ochichi =

Kenyan long-distance runner

Medal record

Women's athletics

Representing Kenya

Olympic Games
Silver medal – second place	2004 Athens	5000 metres

African Championships
Silver medal – second place	2006 Bambous	10,000 m

Commonwealth Games
Gold medal – first place	2006 Melbourne	5000 m

Isabella Bosibori Ochichi (born October 28, 1979, in Kisii District) from Kenya was the silver medal winner in the final of the women's 5,000 meter race at the 2004 Summer Olympics held in Athens, Greece. She finished in a time of 14:48.19, about 2.5 seconds behind the winner, Meseret Defar of Ethiopia.

In 1997, aged 17, she competed in France for her first overseas races. She was selected to represent Kenya at the 2001 IAAF World Half Marathon Championships, where she finished eighth. She competed at the IAAF World Cross Country Championships between 2002 and 2006, the best result being short race bronze medals in 2002 and 2005.

In March 2006 she won the same distance at the Commonwealth Games. In April the same year she won the silver medal in the team competition at the World Cross Country Championships, having finished 10th in the short race.

Although at the peak of her career, Ochichi stopped running professionally in 2006. She returned to competition seven years later in 2013. On her comeback race at the Prague Half Marathon she placed third with a time of 1:09:21 hours (one of her fastest times). She remarked, "After all these years I am very happy to be here. I expected to run well, but I did not think about achieving a third place". She won the Göteborgsvarvet half marathon in May. A debut over the marathon distance followed that October and she managed to take fifth place at the high-profile Amsterdam Marathon, setting her personal best at 2:31:38 hours.

She is married to David Maina, who is also a runner and competes in road racing. She is managed by Gwenaël Vigot and coached by Veronique Billat.

Sporting positions
Preceded by (Romania) Gabriela Szabo	Women's 3000 m season's best 2004	Succeeded by (Bahrain) Maryam Yusuf Jamal
