= Asmae Leghzaoui =

Moroccan long-distance runner

Personal information
- Born: 30 August 1976 (age 49) Fez, Morocco
Medal record
Women's athletics
Representing Morocco
African Championships
Gold medal – first place	2000 Algiers	5000 m
Mediterranean Games
Silver medal – second place	2001 Radès	5000 m
Gold medal – first place	2001 Radès	10,000 m
Silver medal – second place	2005 Almería	5000 m
Silver medal – second place	2005 Almería	10,000 m

Asmae Leghzaoui (Arabic: أسماء لغزاوي; born August 30, 1976) is a Moroccan middle-distance runner. She is a two-time Olympian for Morocco.

== Biography ==
In 1999, Leghzaoui made a running breakthrough by improving her 3000 metres personal best by a minute and breaking the World record for the 10K road race. She was seventh in the women's short race at the 1999 IAAF World Cross Country Championships, leading the Moroccans to the bronze medal in the team competition. On the track, she ran in the 10,000 metres at the 1999 World Championships in Athletics, but failed to finish the race. In 2000, she won the Cinque Mulini cross country meet and took the 5000 m track title at the 2000 African Championships in Athletics later that year.

She won the gold medal in the 10,000 metres and a silver in the 5000 m at the 2001 Mediterranean Games. She represented Morocco at the 2001 World Championships in Athletics and came seventh in the 10,000 m final. She won the New York Mini 10K in 2002, setting a course record time. She failed a drug test for EPO in 2003, but after a two-year ban she has returned to the international road race circuit.

Leghzaoui had a string of road race wins in the United States in May 2005, taking titles at the Lilac Bloomsday Run, Bay to Breakers and Freihofer's Run for Women competitions. She secured both 5000 m and 10,000 m silver medals for Morocco at the 2005 Mediterranean Games. In 2007, she finished sixteenth at the 2007 World Championships. She ran at the 2008 Beijing Olympics but failed to finish in the 10,000 m race. She had back-to-back wins at the National Capital Marathon in Ottawa from 2008 to 2009.

She won the half marathon competition at the 2011 Marrakesh Marathon, completing the race in a competition record time of 1:10:47.

== See also ==
- List of doping cases in athletics
