= Portuguese Cross Country Championships =

- Date: February/March
- Location: Various, Portugal
- Event type: Cross country
- Distance: 12 km and 4 km for men 8 km and 4 km for women
- Established: 1911

The Portuguese Cross Country Championships (Portuguese: Campeonato de Portugal de Corta-Mato) is an annual cross country running competition that serves as Portugal's national championship for the sport. It is usually held in February or March. It was first held in 1911 and featured a men's long course race only. A women's race was added to the programme in 1967. Short course races for both sexes have been held since 2000.

The event includes separate races for both sexes across four categories: open (senior), under-23, under-20, and under-18 (Portuguese: nacional, sub-23, juniores, juvenis). The introduction of short races came shortly after their introduction as an official distance at the IAAF World Cross Country Championships. The under-23 races were established in 2014. The under-20 race is much longer-lived: its debut for men came in 1932 and the women's race appeared for the first time in 1971. The under-18 race for boys was created in 1966 and shortly followed by a girls race in 1972. Each of the races features both an individual and club team component. The short course races are usually held separately from the main long course events. The 2010 and 2012 races were held as part of the annual international Almond Blossom Cross Country race.

Carlos Lopes is the most successful athlete of the competition, having won ten national titles between 1970 and 1984, while Rosa Mota is the most successful woman, with eight titles between 1975 and 1985. In the short races, Rui Silva has the most titles at nine (between 2000 and 2013) and Anália Rosa has the most among women, earning five titles from 2000 to 2006.

== Past senior race winners ==
Edition	Year	Men's winner	Time (m:s)	Women's winner	Time (m:s)
1	1911	Francisco Lázaro		Not held	
2	1912	Matias Carvalho		Not held	
3	1913	Germano Garcês		Not held	
—	1914	Not held			
—	1915	Not held			
—	1916	Not held			
—	1917	Not held			
—	1918	Not held			
—	1919	Not held			
—	1920	Not held			
—	1921	Not held			
4	1922	Mário Conceicào		Not held	
5	1923	Albano Martins		Not held	
—	1924	Not held			
—	1925	Not held			
—	1926	Not held			
—	1927				
6	1928	Manuel Dias		Not held	
—	1929	Not held			
7	1930	Manuel Dias		Not held	
8	1931	Manuel Dias		Not held	
9	1932	Manuel Dias		Not held	
10	1933	Manuel Dias		Not held	
11	1934	Manuel Dias		Not held	
12	1935	Adelino Tavares		Not held	
13	1936	Manuel Dias		Not held	
14	1937	Manuel Dias		Not held	
15	1938	Manuel Nogueira		Not held	
16	1939	Manuel Nogueira		Not held	
17	1940	Manuel Nogueira		Not held	
18	1941	Manuel Nogueira		Not held	
19	1942	Anibal Barào		Not held	
20	1943	Alberto Ferreira		Not held	
21	1944	Joào Silva		Not held	
22	1945	Joào Silva		Not held	
23	1946	Joào Silva		Not held	
24	1947	Filipe Luis		Not held	
25	1948	Filipe Luis		Not held	
26	1949	Alfonso Marquez		Not held	
27	1950	Alvaro Conde		Not held	
28	1951	Filipe Luis		Not held	
29	1952	Filipe Luis		Not held	
30	1953	António Martins		Not held	
31	1954	José Araújo		Not held	
32	1955	Manuel Faria		Not held	
33	1956	Manuel Faria		Not held	
34	1957	Manuel Faria		Not held	
35	1958	Manuel Faria		Not held	
36	1959	Manuel Faria		Not held	
37	1960	Joaquim Ferreira		Not held	
38	1961	Maximiano Pinheiro		Not held	
39	1962	Manuel Oliveira		Not held	
40	1963	Manuel Marquez		Not held	
41	1964	Manuel Oliveira		Not held	
42	1965	Manuel Oliveira		Not held	
43	1966	Anacleto Pinto		Not held	
44	1967	Manuel Oliveira		Manuela Simões	
45	1968	Manuel Oliveira		Manuela Simões	
46	1969	Maximiano Pinheiro		Manuela Simões	
47	1970	Carlos Lopes		Manuela Simões	
48	1971	Carlos Lopes		Branca Seabra	
49	1972	Carlos Lopes		Céu Lopes	
50	1973	Carlos Lopes		Filomena Vieira	
51	1974	Carlos Lopes		Branca Seabra	
52	1975	Aniceto Simões		Rosa Mota	
53	1976	Carlos Lopes		Rosa Mota	
54	1977	Carlos Lopes		Rosa Mota	
55	1978	Carlos Lopes		Rosa Mota	
56	1979	Fernando Mamede		Aurora Cunha	
57	1980	Fernando Mamede		Aurora Cunha	
58	1981	Fernando Mamede		Rosa Mota	
59	1982	Carlos Lopes		Rosa Mota	
60	1983	Fernando Mamede		Aurora Cunha	
61	1984	Carlos Lopes		Rosa Mota	
62	1985	Fernando Mamede		Rosa Mota	
63	1986	Fernando Mamede		Aurora Cunha	
64	1987	Dionísio Castro		Albertina Machado	
65	1988	Ezequiel Canário		Albertina Machado	
66	1989	Ezequiel Canário		Maria Conceição Ferreira	
67	1990	Domingos Castro		Maria Conceição Ferreira	
68	1991	Dionísio Castro		Maria Conceição Ferreira	
69	1992	António Pinto		Albertina Dias	
70	1993	Domingos Castro		Albertina Dias	
71	1994	Domingos Castro		Maria Conceição Ferreira	
72	1995	Paulo Guerra		Albertina Dias	
73	1996	Paulo Guerra		Fernanda Ribeiro	
74	1997	Paulo Guerra		Fernanda Ribeiro	
75	1998	Domingos Castro		Fernanda Ribeiro	
76	1999	Paulo Guerra		Fernanda Ribeiro	
77	2000	Eduardo Henriques		Carla Sacramento	
78	2001	Paulo Guerra		Carla Sacramento	
79	2002	Eduardo Henriques		Carla Sacramento	
80	2003	Domingos Castro		Fernanda Ribeiro	
81	2004	Fernando Silva		Anália Rosa	
82	2005	Fernando Silva		Anália Rosa	
83	2006	Eduardo Henriques		Jéssica Augusto	
84	2007	Rui Pedro Silva		Jéssica Augusto	
85	2008	Eduardo Henriques		Jéssica Augusto	
86	2009	Rui Pedro Silva		Inês Monteiro	
87	2010	Yousef el Kalai		Ana Dulce Félix	
88	2011	Yousef el Kalai		Ana Dulce Félix	
89	2012	Manuel Damião		Ana Dulce Félix	
90	2013	Manuel Damião		Ana Dulce Félix	
91	2014	Manuel Damião		Ana Dulce Félix	
92	2015	Rui Pinto		Ana Dulce Félix	
93	2016	Nelson Epifanio Da Cruz (CPV)		Carla Salomé Rocha	
94	2017	Nelson Epifanio Da Cruz (CPV)		Carla Salomé Rocha	
95	2018	Nelson Epifanio Da Cruz (CPV)		Carla Salomé Rocha	
96	2019	Nelson Epifanio Da Cruz (CPV)		Carla Salomé Rocha	
2020	Not held				
97	2021	Nelson Epifanio Da Cruz (CPV)		Carla Salomé Rocha	

The following year's races were won by non-Portuguese runners:

- 2012: Josphat Kiprono Menjo (35:40) and Gorreti Chepkoech (26:05), both of Kenya
- 2010: Mark Bett of Kenya in 35:22

=== Short race ===
Year	Men's winner	Time (m:s)	Women's winner	Time (m:s)
2000	Rui Silva		Anália Rosa	
2001	Rui Silva		Anália Rosa	
2002	Rui Silva		Anália Rosa	
2003	Rui Silva		Fernanda Ribeiro	
2004	Manuel Damião		Ana Dias	
2005	Ricardo Ribas		Anália Rosa	
2006	Rui Silva		Anália Rosa	
2007	Ricardo Ribas		Claudia Pereira	
2008	Mário Teixeira		Sara Moreira	
2009	Rui Silva		Sara Moreira	
2010	Rui Silva		Ana Dulce Félix	
2011	Rui Silva		Sara Moreira	
2012	Rui Silva		Carla Salomé Rocha	
2013	Rui Silva		Carla Salomé Rocha	
2014	Manuel Damião		Carla Salomé Rocha	
2015	Rui Pinto		Catarina Ribeiro	
2016	Andre Pereira		Daniela Cunha	
2017	Andre Pereira		Daniela Cunha	
2018	Andre Pereira		Daniela Cunha	
2019	Andre Pereira		Daniela Cunha	
2020	Andre Pereira		Daniela Cunha	
2021	Andre Pereira		Daniela Cunha	
