= Manuel Dias =

Manuel Dias may refer to:

- Manuel Dias the Younger (1574–1659), Portuguese Jesuit missionary
- Manuel Dias (athlete) (1905–?), Portuguese athlete
