= Almond Blossom Cross Country =

Cross country competition

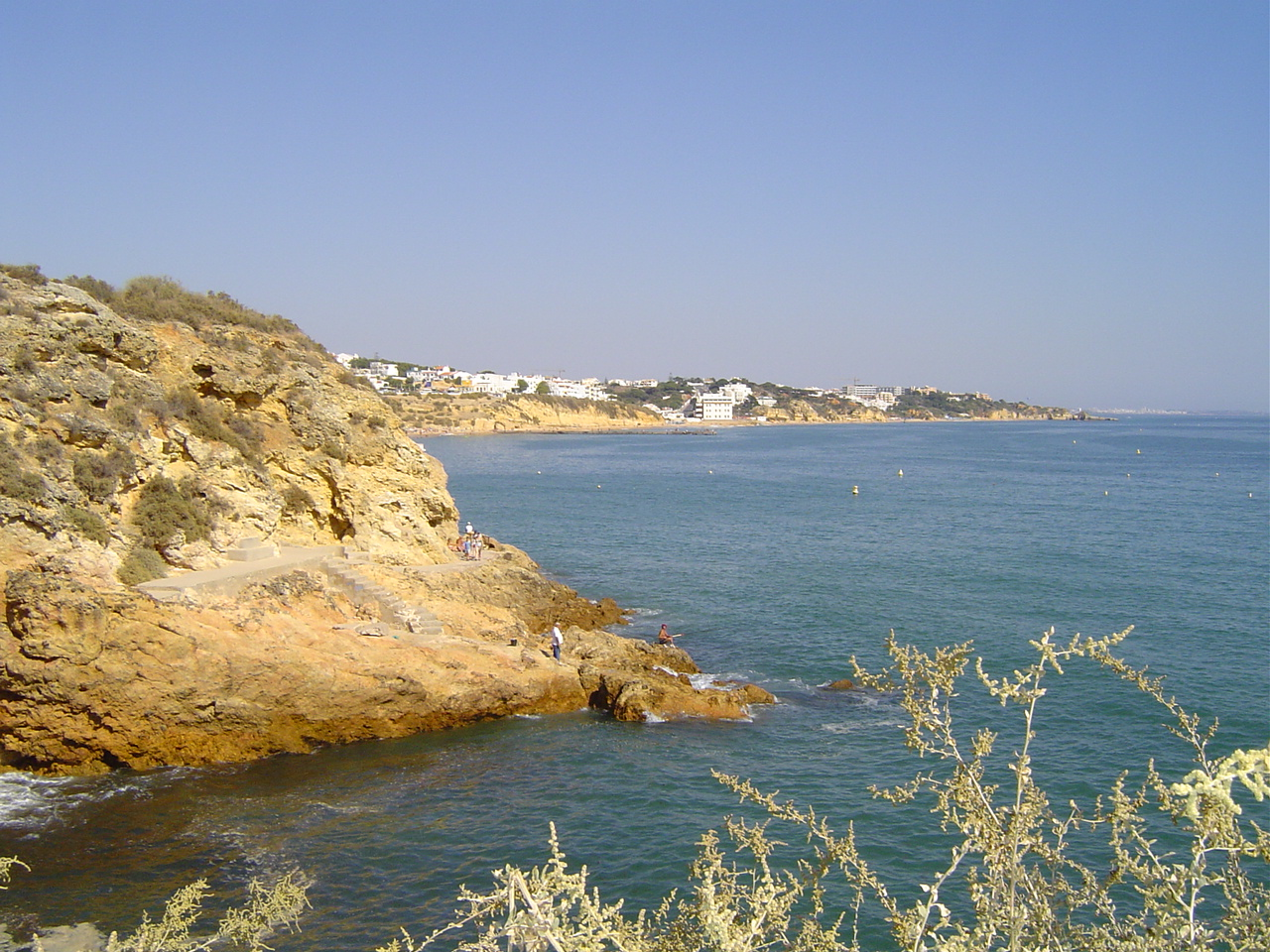
- The race takes place in a touristic town in the Algarve
- Date: Early February
- Location: Albufeira, Portugal
- Event type: Cross country
- Distance: 9.28 km (6 mi) for men & women (2026)
- Established: 1977
- Website: Almond Blossom Cross Country

The Almond Blossom Cross Country (Portuguese: Cross Internacional das Amendoeiras em Flor) is an annual international cross country running competition which takes place in Albufeira, in the Algarve region of Portugal, in early March. It is one of the IAAF permit meetings which serve as qualifying events for the IAAF World Cross Country Championships. It is held in co-operation with the Associação de Atletismo do Algarve (Algarve Athletics Association). The race gets its name from the white blossom which appears on the almond trees native to the Algarve region during the spring.

== History ==
The competition was first organised in 1977 through a joint partnership of the Federação Portuguesa de Atletismo (Portuguese Athletics Federation), the District of Faro and Turismo de Portugal, with the aim of promoting both sport and tourism in the region. The race relocated to Vilamoura in Loulé, another town nearby, in 1996 and the competition remained there until 2003. The 2004 edition was not held due to financial problems, causing the race's annual history to be interrupted for the first time. The Almond Blossom Cross returned to its original home in Albufeira in 2005 and has been held there annually ever since.

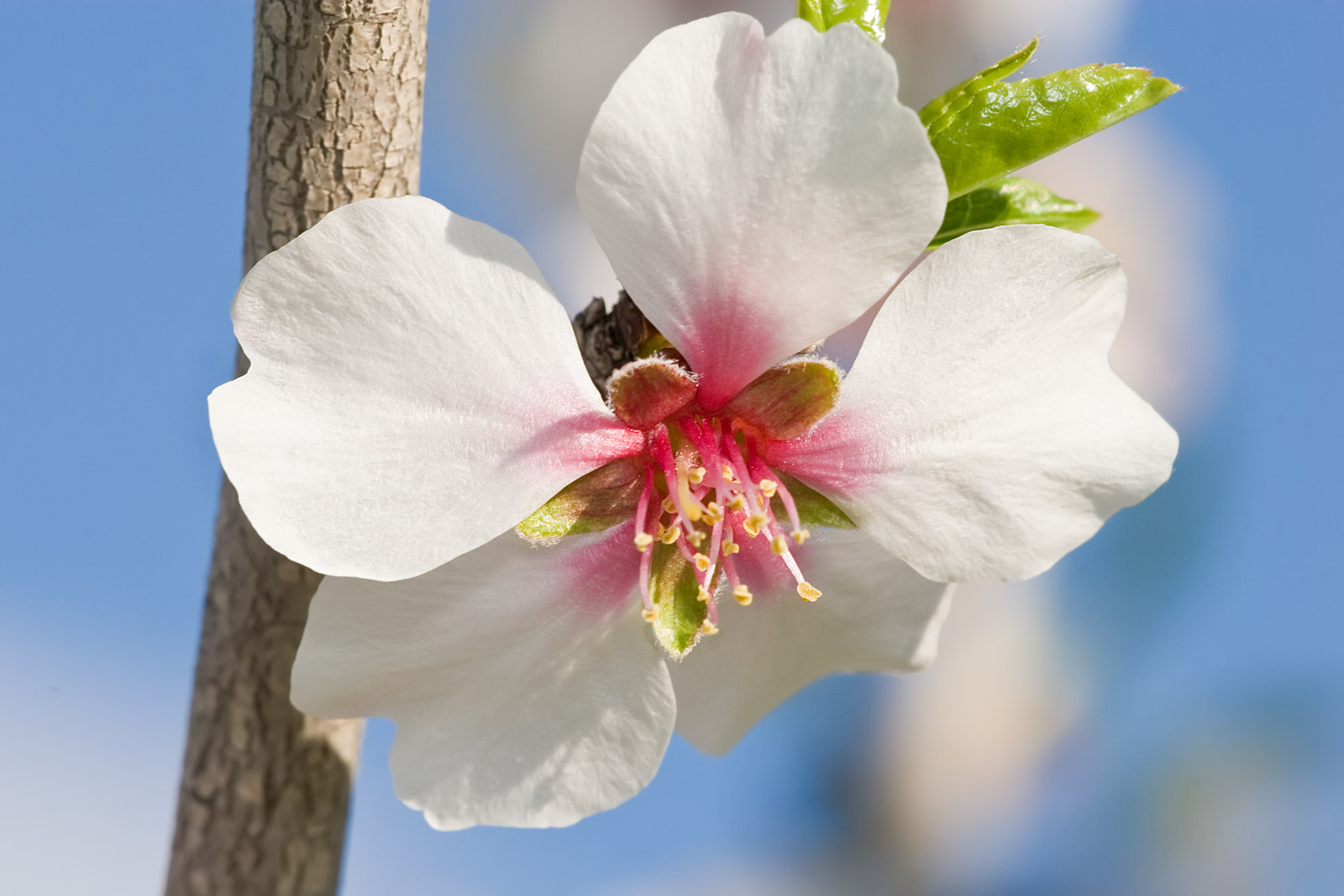
The white flowers of an almond tree (a typical cultivar of Algarve), after which the competition is named

The race takes place at the Açoteias Cross Country course; a looping track which is 2 km (1.2 mi) in length and comprises sections of both grass and sand. The race distances have traditionally been 10 km (6 mi) for men and 6 km (4 mi) for women, but this was extended in the 2010 edition to 12 km (7 mi) and 8 km (5 mi).

The Almond Blossom Cross Country competition is international in its nature, attracting a large number of foreign athletes each year, but it is also a significant draw for Portugal's top domestic runners. Among the past winners in the men's race are Portuguese world medallists Fernando Mamede and Paulo Guerra, track world champion Charles Kamathi, and Serhiy Lebid – a multiple European champion. On the women's side, past winners include Olympic champions Fernanda Ribeiro and Gabriela Szabo, the 1996 World Cross Country champion Gete Wami, and world champion in the 10,000 m Berhane Adere. Only two Portuguese athletes have won at the World Cross Country Championships (Carlos Lopes and Albertina Dias) and both have been victorious in Albufeira: Lopes won the first ever Almond Blossom race in 1977 while Dias won the 1989 women's race.

The Açoteias Cross Country course was also used to host the European Clubs Cross Country Cup in 2008, as it had done a number of times in the 1980s and 1990s. During the Almond Blossom's time in Vilamoura, it served as the tester race for the 2000 IAAF World Cross Country Championships, which was held on the same course a month later. The competition itself was selected in 2010 to host the Portuguese Cross Country Championships, in which Yousef El Kalai and Ana Dulce Félix took the honours in the men's and women's races, respectively. The national competition returned to the race in 2012 and Manuel Damião was the men's Portuguese victor, while Félix again won the women's title. A year later Damião became the first Portuguese man to win the Almond Blossom race itself since 1995 – the invited African contingent (including four-time winner Josphat Kiprono Menjo) did not arrive due to travel issues. The 2014 race again hosted the European Clubs event and Morocco's Mohamed Moustaoui continued to break the Kenya dominance of the men's race.

== Past senior race winners ==
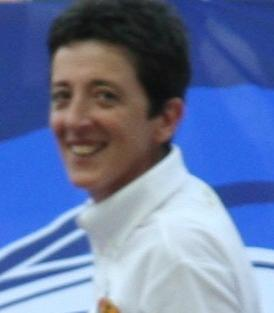
Rosa Mota – the winner of the first women's race in 1978

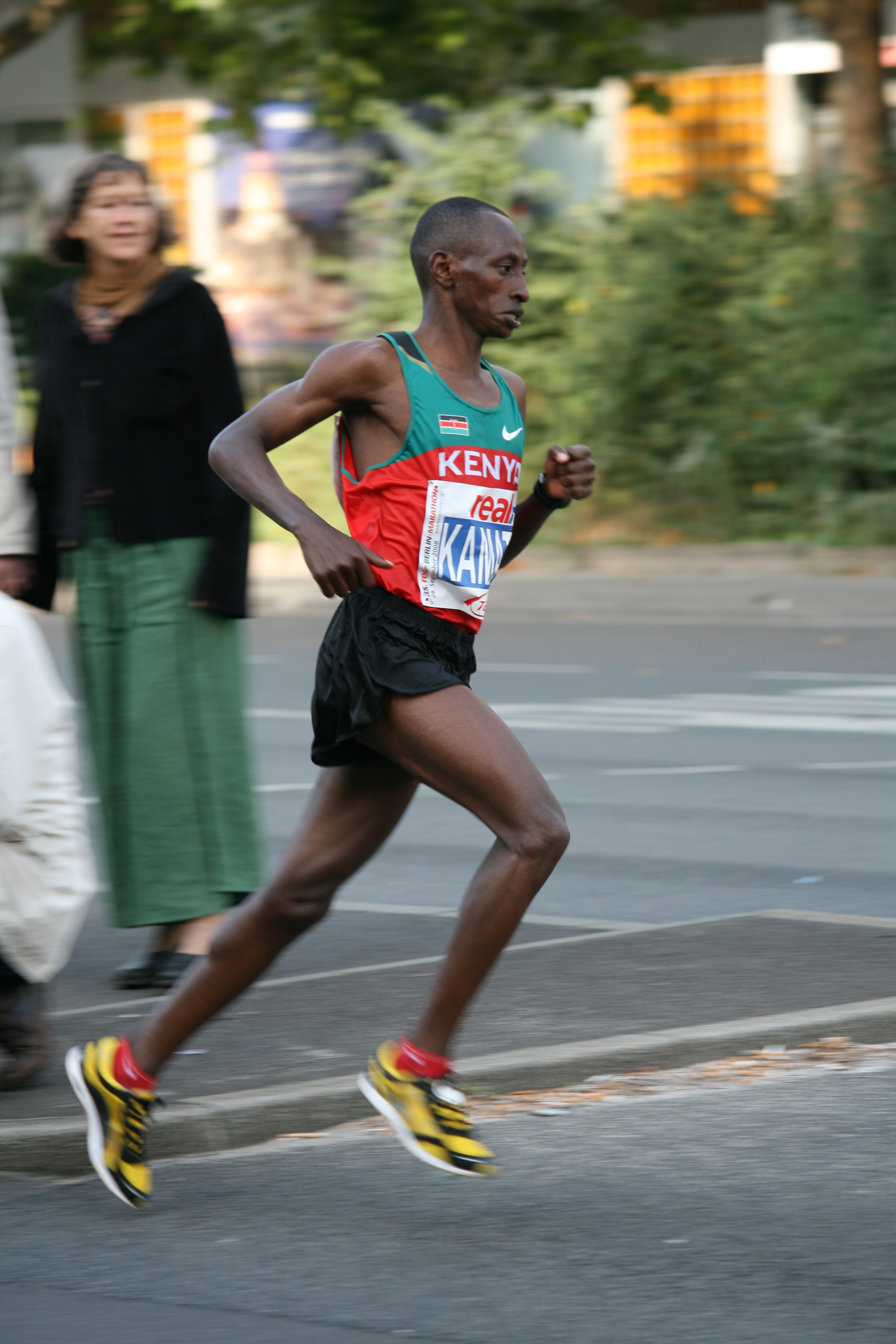
Charles Kamathi of Kenya was the 2000 men's champion

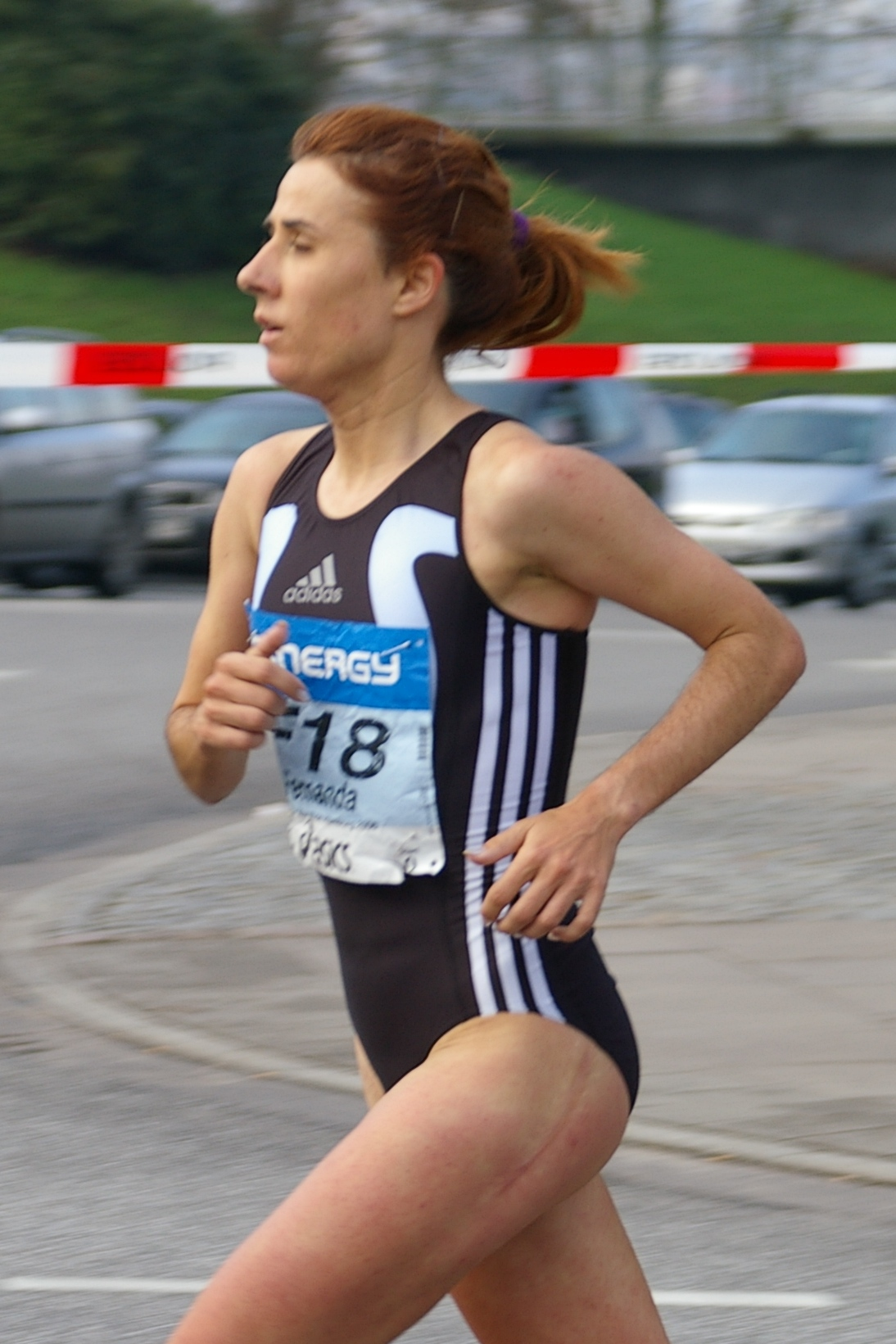
Portuguese Olympic champion Fernanda Ribeiro won in 2003

Key: Portuguese championship race (12 km and 8 km races)
Distances: 8 km and 5 km races 4 km race (10 km for men and 6 km for women where not stated)

Edition	Year	Men's winner	Time (m:s)	Women's winner	Time (m:s)
1st	1977	Carlos Lopes (POR)	?	—	—
2nd	1978	Greg Meyer (USA)	29:44	Rosa Mota (POR)	?
3rd	1979	Frank Zimmermann (GER)	30:09	Penny Yule (GBR)	13:19
4th	1980	Fernando Mamede (POR)	28:44	Wendy Smith (GBR)	13:02
5th	1981	Fernando Mamede (POR)	31:04	Wendy Smith (GBR)	?
6th	1982	Christoph Herle (GER)	30:03	Aurora Cunha (POR)	13:20
7th	1983	Fernando Mamede (POR)	?	Aurora Cunha (POR)	?
8th	1984	Frank Zimmermann (GER)	?	Aurora Cunha (POR)	?
9th	1985	António Leitão (POR)	?	Rosa Mota (POR)	?
10th	1986	António Leitão (POR)	?	Ruth Partridge (GBR)	?
11th	1987	Vincent Rousseau (BEL)	?	Ria Van Landeghem (BEL)	?
12th	1988	José Regalo (POR)	30:02	Angela Tooby (GBR)	20:01
13th	1989	José Regalo (POR)	23:42	Albertina Dias (POR)	16:46
14th	1990	Dionísio Castro (POR)	29:39	Jeanne-Marie Pipoz (SUI)	20:06
15th	1991	Richard Chelimo (KEN)	30:05	Catherina McKiernan (IRL)	20:04
16th	1992	Fita Bayisa (ETH)	29:06	Luchia Yishak (ETH)	19:37
17th	1993	Ondoro Osoro (KEN)	29:00	Tegla Loroupe (KEN)	19:48
18th	1994	Ondoro Osoro (KEN)	29:10	Catherina McKiernan (IRL)	19:34
19th	1995	Paulo Guerra (POR)	29:21	Gabriela Szabo (ROM)	19:31
20th	1996	Emerson Iser Bem (BRA)	29:58	Gabriela Szabo (ROM)	19:45
21st	1997	Thomas Nyariki (KEN)	28:41	Elena Fidatov (ROM)	19:31
22nd	1998	Thomas Nyariki (KEN)	29:30	Julia Vaquero (ESP)	19:25
23rd	1999	Thomas Nyariki (KEN)	29:39	Zahra Ouaziz (MAR)	19:31
24th	2000	Charles Kamathi (KEN)	29:34	Gete Wami (ETH)	19:46
25th	2001	Patrick Ivuti (KEN)	20:34	Lydia Cheromei (KEN)	19:48
26th	2002	Thomas Nyariki (KEN)	29:48	Berhane Adere (ETH)	19:49
27th	2003	Patrick Ivuti (KEN)	29:33	Fernanda Ribeiro (POR)	20:12
—	2004	Not held	—	Not held	—
28th	2005	Moses Mosop (KEN)	27:49	Nancy Kiprop (KEN)	19:35
29th	2006	Peter Kamais (KEN)	28:01	Jeļena Prokopčuka (LAT)	19:32
30th	2007	Serhiy Lebid (UKR)	29:15	Dorcus Inzikuru (UGA)	19:27
31st	2008	Josphat Menjo (KEN)	29:08	Mariya Konovalova (RUS)	19:03
32nd	2009	Josphat Menjo (KEN)	31:01	Jeļena Prokopčuka (LAT)	19:30
33rd	2010	Mark Bett (KEN)	35:22	Ana Dulce Félix (POR)	26:09
34th	2011	Josphat Menjo (KEN)	30:21	Anikó Kálovics (HUN)	19:38
35th	2012	Josphat Menjo (KEN)	35:40	Goretti Chepkoech (KEN)	26:05
36th	2013	Manuel Damião (POR)	29:19	Goretti Chepkoech (KEN)	19:16
37th	2014	Mohamed Moustaoui (MAR)	29:13	Hiwot Ayalew (ETH)	20:15
38th	2015	Roman Prodius (MDA)	24:18	Dominika Nowakowska (POL)	14:51
39th	2016	Nelson Cruz (CPV)	30:43	Carla Salomé Rocha (POR)	34:09
40th	2017	Yemaneberhan Crippa (ITA)	30:04	Irene Cheptai (KEN)	20:18
41st	2018	Soufiane El Bakkali (MAR)	28:13	Carla Salomé Rocha (POR)	20:44
42nd	2019	Jacob Kiplimo (UGA)	29:00	Fancy Cherono (KEN)	20:15
43rd	2020	Davis Kiplangat (KEN)	27:11	Lydia Lagat (KEN)	20:20
44th	2021	Thierry Ndikumwenayo (BDI)	25:22	Likina Amebaw (ETH)	22:42
45th	2022	Rodrigue Kwizera (BDI)	24:21	Rahel Daniel (ERI)	21:09
46th	2023	Yann Schrub (FRA)	25:17	Likina Amebaw (ETH)	21:35
47th	2024	Thierry Ndikumwenayo (ESP)	27:18	Likina Amebaw (ETH)	30:45
48th	2025	Rodrigue Kwizera (BDI)	27:02	Francine Niyomukunzi (BDI)	31:44
49th	2026	Rodrigue Kwizera (BDI)	27:19	Mirriam Cherop (KEN)	31:36

== Statistics ==
=== Winners by country ===
Country	Men's race	Women's race	Total
Kenya	18	9	27
Portugal	11	10	21
Ethiopia	1	7	8
Burundi	4	1	5
United Kingdom	0	5	5
Germany	3	0	3
Morocco	2	1	3
Romania	0	3	3
Belgium	1	1	2
Ireland	0	2	2
Latvia	0	2	2
Spain	1	1	2
Uganda	1	1	2
Brazil	1	0	1
Cape Verde	1	0	1
Eritrea	0	1	1
Moldova	1	0	1
Hungary	0	1	1
Poland	0	1	1
Switzerland	0	1	1
Russia	0	1	1
Ukraine	1	0	1
United States	1	0	1
France	1	0	1

=== Multiple winners ===
Athlete	Country	Wins	Years
Thomas Nyariki	Kenya	4	1997, 1998, 1999, 2002
Josphat Kiprono Menjo	Kenya	4	2008, 2009, 2011, 2012
Fernando Mamede	Portugal	3	1980, 1981, 1983
Aurora Cunha	Portugal	3	1982, 1983, 1984
Rodrigue Kwizera	Burundi	3	2022, 2025, 2026
Wendy Smith-Sly	United Kingdom	2	1980, 1981
Frank Zimmermann	Germany	2	1979, 1984
Rosa Mota	Portugal	2	1978, 1985
António Leitão	Portugal	2	1985, 1986
José Regalo	Portugal	2	1988, 1989
Ondoro Osoro	Kenya	2	1993, 1994
Catherina McKiernan	Ireland	2	1991, 1994
Gabriela Szabo	Romania	2	1995, 1996
Patrick Ivuti	Kenya	2	2001, 2003
Jeļena Prokopčuka	Latvia	2	2006, 2009
Gorreti Chepkoech	Kenya	2	2012, 2013
Likina Amebaw	Ethiopia	2	2021, 2023
Thierry Ndikumwenayo	Burundi; Spain	2	2021, 2024
