= Cursa de Bombers =

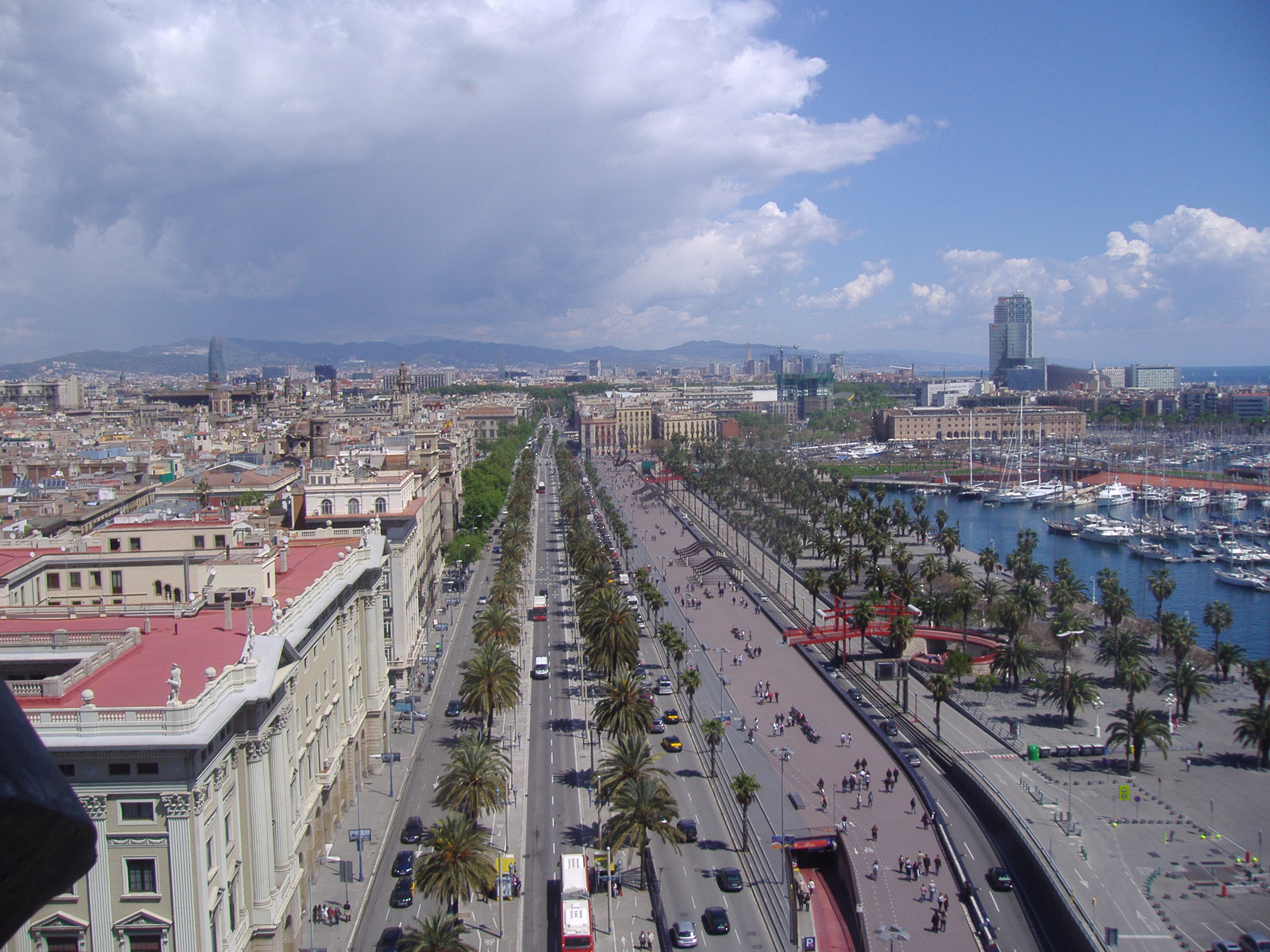
- The race passes through the Passeig de Colom
- Date: April
- Location: Barcelona, Catalonia, Spain
- Event type: Road
- Distance: 10 km
- Established: 1999
- Course records: Men: 27:04 (2010) (Kenya) Josphat Menjo; Women: 31:25 (2005) (Kenya) Irene Kwambai
- Website: Cursa de Bombers

The Cursa de Bombers (English: Fireman's Race) is an annual road running race over 10 km which takes place in April in Barcelona, Catalonia, Spain.

== History and course ==
The race was created in 1999 as a joint venture between the Bombers de Barcelona (Firemen of Barcelona) and Nike as a way of protesting against the Ayuntamiento de Barcelona (Barcelona City Council) for their refusal to respond to the firefighters' demands for improved working conditions. The race has since grown significantly as both an elite and popular race, with major Spanish runners such as Marta Domínguez taking part and over 13,000 athletes running the course by the 2007 edition of the event. A record of 18,014 people participated in the 2010 race – edition which held IAAF Bronze Label Road Race status.

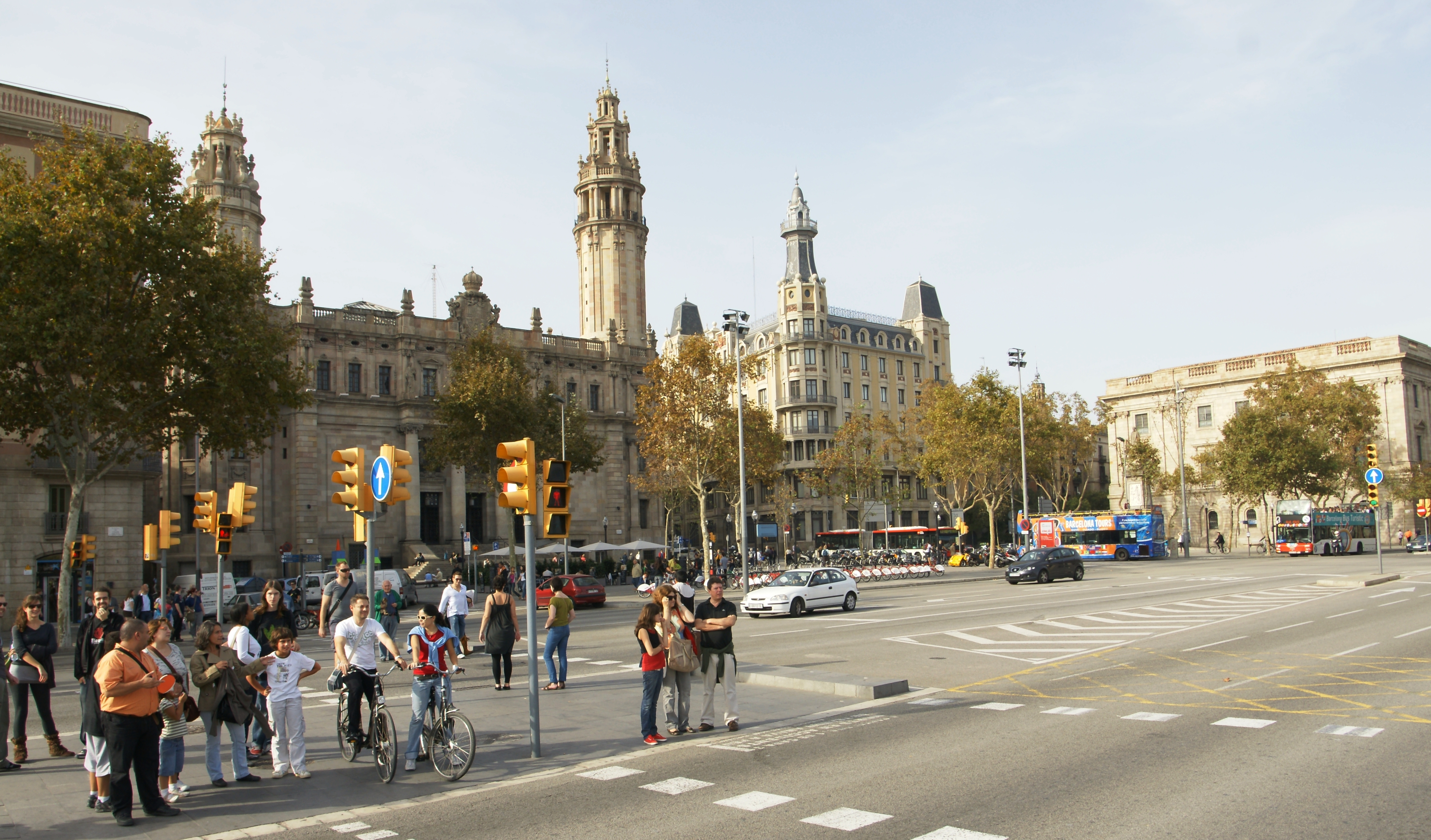
A view of Via Laietana near the end of the course

The course of the race is uphill for the first 4 km (2 mi) and has a slow decline over the remaining 6 km (4 mi). The race has a looped circuit which is clockwise in direction and goes through a number of major roads in the city. Beginning on Avenida Marques de Argentera, near the Parc de la Ciutadella, the race heads west toward Passeig de Colom before going northwards along Avinguda del Paral·lel. The route turns eastwards at Calle Floridablanca and follows a straight path along Gran Via de les Corts Catalanes. The race begins to loop back to the start at this point, passing through Passeig de Sant Joan, Ronda de Sant Pere and finally onto Via Laietana

The elite race has been dominated by Kenya runners, with all but two editions of the men's race having a Kenyan victor and half of the past women's race winners coming from the country. In spite of this, the race remains popular among the top domestic runners, such as Chema Martínez, Nuria Fernández, and Carles Castillejo, who have reached one of the top three spots. The 2011 elite race was reduced to a sub-national level race as only those who were registered with the Catalan Athletics Federation were allowed to compete. With little competition, and hot weather to contend with, the winning times were among the slowest ever for the race.

== Past winners ==
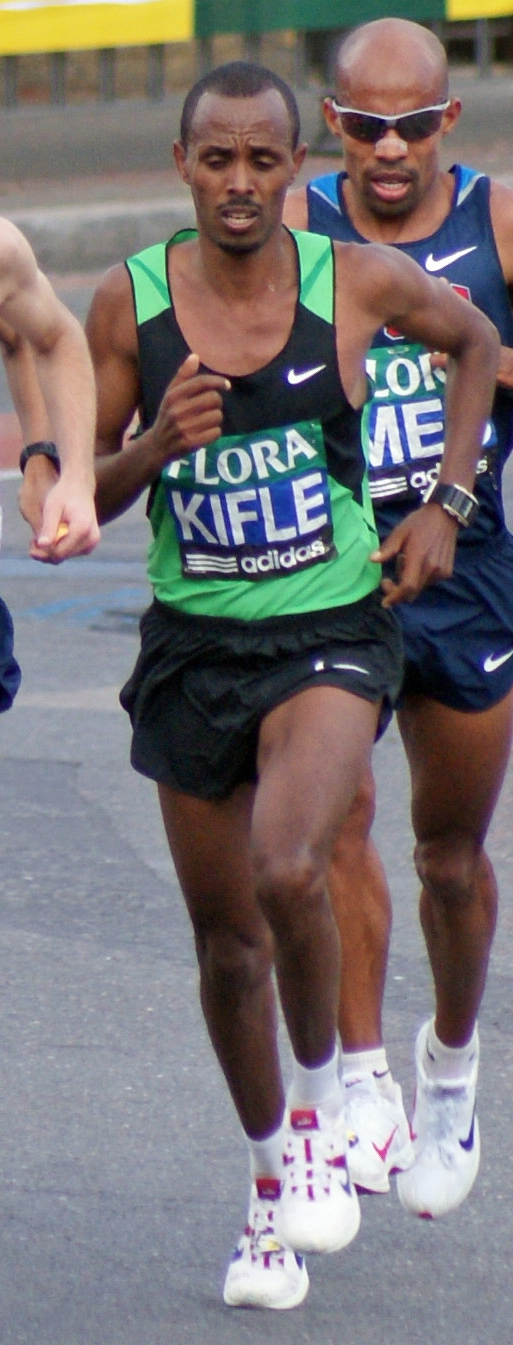
The 2002 men's winner was Yonas Kifle.

Key: Course record

Edition	Year	Men's winner	Time (m:s)	Women's winner	Time (m:s)
20th	2018	Marc Alcalá (ESP)	29:29	Marta Galimany (ESP)	33:54
19th	2017	Ibrahim Ezzaydouni (MAR)	29:30	Jess Andrews (GBR)	32:49
18th	2016	Ilias Fifa (ESP)	28:55	Marta Galimany (ESP)	34:38
17th	2015	Mohamed Zarhouni (ESP)	30:08	Lisa Ohberg (SWE)	36:59
16th	2014	Ángel Ronco (ESP)	30:14	Lidia Rodríguez (ESP)	34:23
15th	2013	Chema Martínez (ESP)	29:48	Judith Plá (ESP)	33:09
14th	2012	Ayad Lamdassem (ESP)	28:54	Judith Plá (ESP)	32:43
13th	2011	Ayad Lamdassem (ESP)	30:02	Natalia Rodríguez (ESP)	35:25
12th	2010	Josphat Menjo (KEN)	27:04	Jéssica Augusto (POR)	32:08
11th	2009	Josphat Menjo (KEN)	27:32	Makda Harun (ETH)	32:39
10th	2008	Josphat Menjo (KEN)	27:57	Eunice Jepkorir (KEN)	31:37
9th	2007	Peter Kamais (KEN)	27:57	Eunice Jepkorir (KEN)	31:49
8th	2006	Peter Kamais (KEN)	27:29	Belaynesh Fikadu (ETH)	31:55
7th	2005	Sahle Warga (ETH)	28:35	Irene Kwambai (KEN)	31:25
6th	2004	Edwin Soi (KEN)	28:32	Irene Kwambai (KEN)	32:18
5th	2003	David Tuwei (KEN)	28:32	Marta Domínguez (ESP)	34:06
4th	2002	Yonas Kifle (ERI)	28:29	Flomena Chepchirchir (KEN)	33:10
3rd	2001	David Tuwei (KEN)	28:24	Taussi Juma (TAN)	32:33
2nd	2000	John Itati (KEN)	28:39	Leah Kiprono (KEN)	33:02
1st	1999	Cheren Simatwa (KEN)	28:24	Meritxell Martos (ESP)	36:04

== Statistics ==
Winners by country
Country	Race wins		
Country	Men's	Women's	Total
Kenya	10	6	16
Spain	6	7	13
Ethiopia	1	2	3
Eritrea	1	0	1
Morocco	1	0	1
Portugal	0	1	1
United Kingdom	0	1	1
Sweden	0	1	1
Tanzania	0	1	1

Multiple winners
Athlete	Country	Wins	Years
Josphat Kiprono Menjo	Kenya	3	2008, 2009, 2010
David Tuwei	Kenya	2	2001, 2003
Irene Kwambai Kipchumba	Kenya	2	2004, 2005
Peter Kamais	Kenya	2	2006, 2007
Eunice Jepkorir	Kenya	2	2007, 2008
Ayad Lamdessem	Spain	2	2012, 2013
Judit Pla	Spain	2	2012, 2013

== See also ==
- Barcelona Marathon
- San Silvestre Vallecana
