= Record (Portuguese newspaper) =

Portuguese sports newspaper

- Type: Daily sports newspaper
- Format: Tabloid
- Owner(s): Cofina SGPS, S.A.
- Editor: Alexandre Pais
- Founded: 1949; 77 years ago
- Headquarters: R. Luciana Stegagno Picchio; 1549-023 Lisbon
- ISSN: 3577-0015
- Website: record.pt

Record is a Portuguese sports newspaper, founded in 1949 by Manuel Dias, published in Lisbon. Although it covers most sports, football is the focal point of it, and almost always is the only sport referred to on the cover.

== History and profile ==
Record was founded by Manuel Dias. Dias was a newspaper vendor as well as an athlete. Dias participated the 1936 Summer Olympics in Berlin, Germany. In 1949, Dias would enter the national lottery in Portugal and would win 40 contos. Dias would use these funds to establish the Record newspaper. The first edition of the newspaper was published on 26 of November 1949 and was sold on a weekly basis. Over the 63 years, Record have had a difficult times and gone through becoming a privatized company to a publicly traded one.

Before the Carnation Revolution (1974) Record belonged to the Banco Borges and Irmão, a bank. Then it was nationalized following the revolution and its Processo Revolucionário Em Curso.

In 1989, Record was reprivatized and was acquired by the company Projectos e Estudos de Imprensa (PEI), which also became the owner of the paper Diário Popular the next year. The company was headed by Pedro Santana Lopes, a member of the Social Democratic Party (PSD). During the 1990s, Record began to be released on a daily basis from Monday to Sunday, and the paper was acquired by the Cofina media conglomerate. In 2005, Record created an award called the Artur Agostinho Award in memory of Artur Agostinho; the award distinguishes the person of the year in sport.

== Circulation ==
In 2007, Record was the third-best-selling Portuguese newspaper with a circulation of 74,000 copies. The paper claimed it was the leading sport newspaper in Portugal with 62,245 copies in 2011, and was also the leading website in Portuguese sport newspapers, with 216 million page views recorded in May 2012. Between September and October 2013, the paper had a circulation of 50,886 copies.

== Teams of the Year ==
Since 2012, Record has organised the Team of the Year award, which distinguishes the best eleven players of the calendar year of the Primeira Liga.

=== 2012 ===
| Pos. | Player | Club |
|---|---|---|
| GK | (Portugal) Rui Patrício | Sporting CP |
| RB | (Uruguay) Maxi Pereira | Benfica |
| CB | (Brazil) Maicon | Porto |
| CB | (Argentina) Ezequiel Garay | Benfica |
| LB | (Argentina) Emiliano Insúa | Sporting CP |
| DM | (Brazil) Fernando | Porto |
| CM | (Portugal) João Moutinho | Porto |
| RM | (Brazil) Hulk | Porto |
| RM | (Colombia) James Rodríguez | Porto |
| FW | (Paraguay) Óscar Cardozo | Benfica |
| FW | (Brazil) Lima | Benfica |
