= Belgrade Race through History =

The Belgrade Race Through History (Serbian: Београдска трка кроз историју, Beogradska trka kroz istoriju) is an annual men's footrace of around 6 kilometres (5834 metres) that is held in Belgrade, Serbia. The course of the race traces a path through the capital's ancient fortress; the Kalemegdan. The purpose of the race is to emphasise the history and culture of the city through sport. The contest's unusual setting means that it incorporates aspects of road running, cross country running and trail running: it passes through roads, cobblestone walkways, grassy areas and bridges.

First held in 1996, the competition continued annually through its fourth running in 1999. The 1999 NATO bombing of Yugoslavia did not prevent the race from taking place that year. The date was changed to October and it was the first major international sporting event to be held in Belgrade following the Kosovo War.

At that point it went through a ten-year hiatus, due to funding problems, but the event was revived in 2009. The competition shares an organisation committee with the Belgrade Marathon and the two events have often been held in proximity to each other.

The course, which follows a switchback-style path, does not allow for a large number of runners and throughout its history no more than thirty athletes have taken part in each competition. As a result, the competitors tend to be some of the best professional long-distance runners. Paul Tergat, the former Marathon world record holder and two-time Olympic silver medallist, competed at all four races in the 1990s and was the guest of honour at the reopening in 2009. Boniface Kirui won the race's comeback event in 17 minutes and 15 seconds, with second-placed Joseph Kiptoo Birech finishing with the same time. Josphat Menjo set a course record to win the following year in a race where three others dipped under the previous best mark.

== Past winners ==
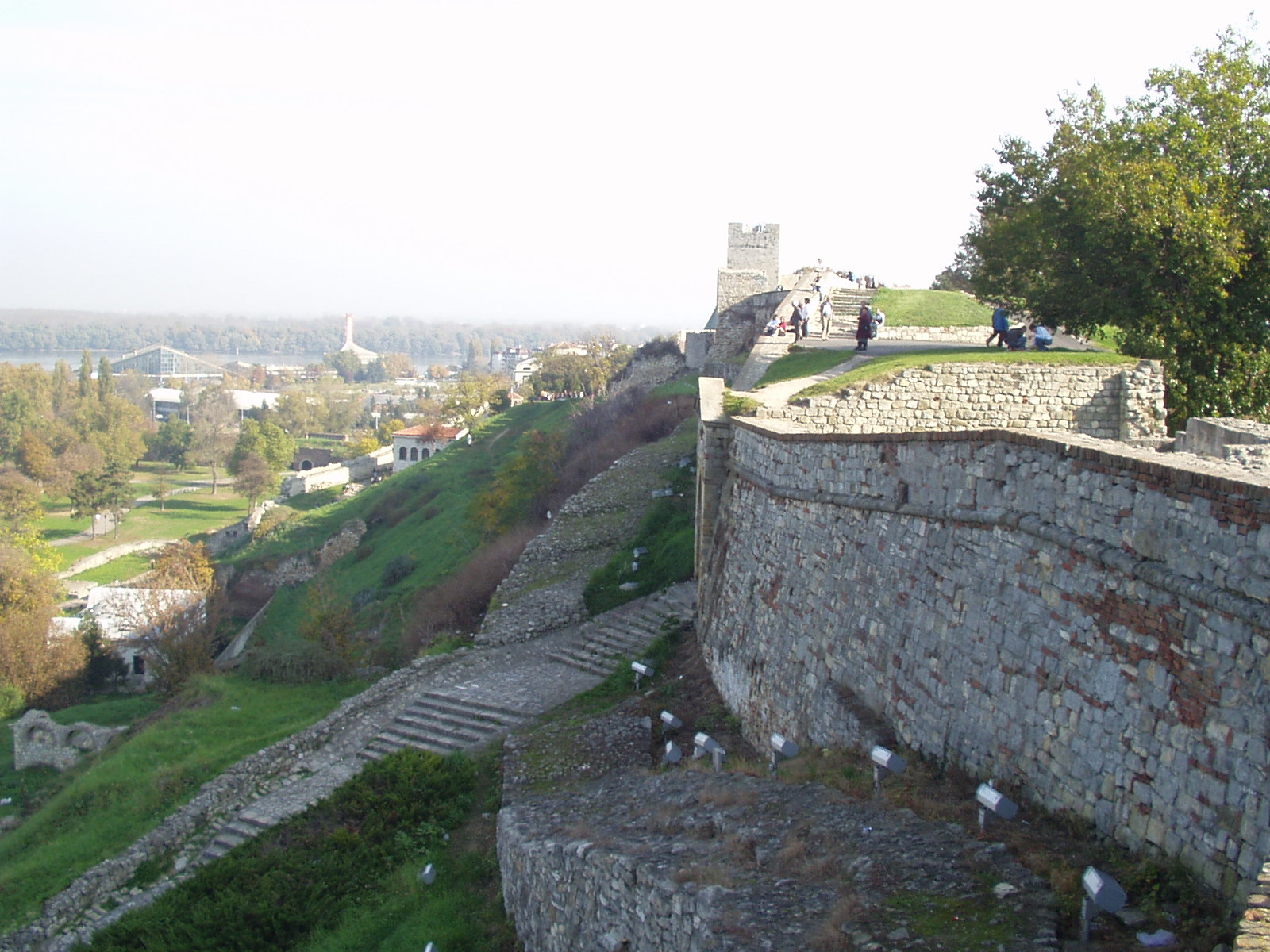
The race features a steep incline into the fortress at the mid-way point.

Key: Course record

Edition	Year	Winner	Time (m:s)
1st	1996	Brahim Lahlafi (MAR)	16:58
2nd	1997	Hendrick Ramaala (RSA)	17:20
3rd	1998	Philip Mosima (KEN)	17:02
4th	1999	Fita Bayisa (ETH)	17:08
5th	2009	Boniface Kirui (KEN)	17:15
6th	2010	Josphat Menjo (KEN)	16:53
