= Cross de San Sebastián =

- Date: November
- Location: San Sebastián, Spain
- Event type: Cross country
- Distance: 6.9 km for men & women
- Established: 1956
- Website: Official website

The Cross Internacional de San Sebastián, also known as the Cross Internacional de Donostia, is an annual cross country running event which is staged in late January in San Sebastián, Spain.

The competition was first held in 1956 as a men's only race and attracted top level runners from the outset, with Olympic gold medallists Emil Zátopek, Alain Mimoun and Mamo Wolde being among the winners in the first decade of the event. A women's race was introduced in 1971 and two-time World Cross champion Carmen Valero took a record four back-to-back wins soon after. From the 1970s to 1980s, a mix of Iberian and British athletes topped the podium, but since the 1990s the race has been dominated by runners of East African origin.

The grassy course is relatively flat and the distances for the elite races are 10 km for men and 5.3 km for women. In addition to the professional races, there are also popular fun run races on the day's events programme; there are various age category races for children and youths, as well as a veteran's races for older runners.

The Cross de San Sebastián has featured many of the world's most prominent names in long-distance running, including marathon world record holder Haile Gebrselassie, Olympic champions Derartu Tulu, John Ngugi and Rosa Mota, as well as world cross country champions such as Zersenay Tadese, Gebre Gebremariam and Benita Johnson. Among the Europeans to have topped the podium are former world record holders Carlos Lopes and David Bedford, as well as past European Cross champions Marta Domínguez, Paulo Guerra and Serhiy Lebid. The competition has also incorporated the regional Gipuzkoan cross country championships in previous editions.

== Past senior race winners ==
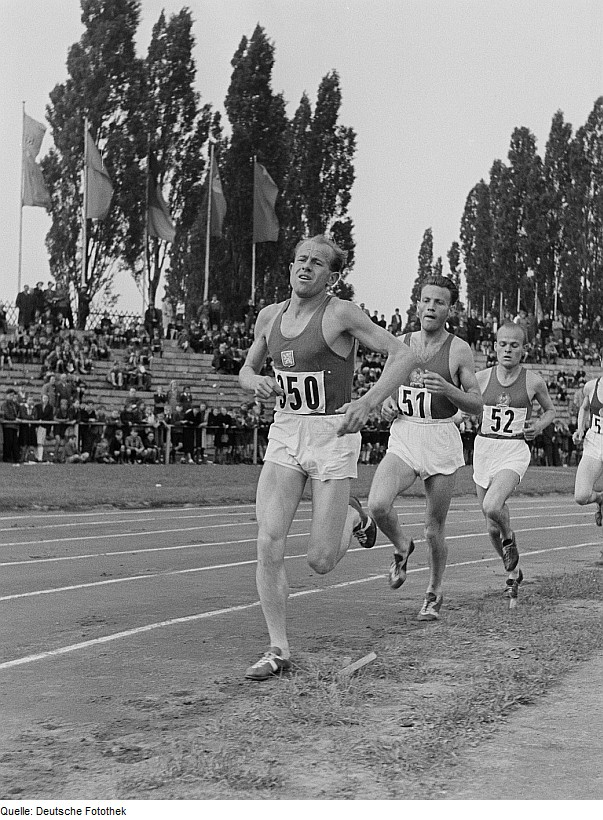
Czech athlete Emil Zátopek won the third edition.

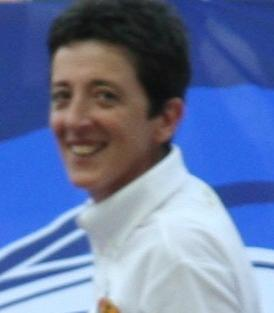
Rosa Mota of Portugal won three times consecutively in the 1980s.

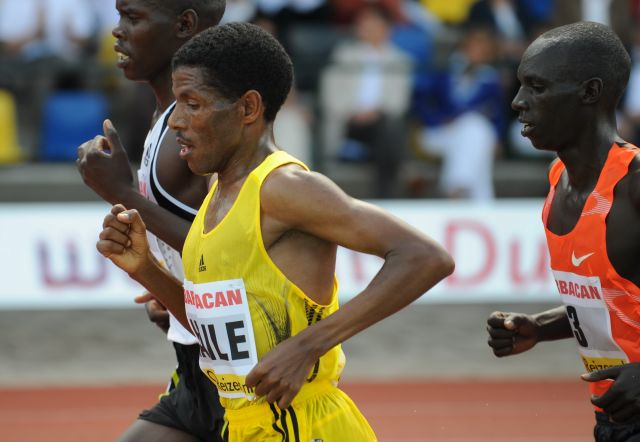
Haile Gebrselassie won the 1994 men's race.

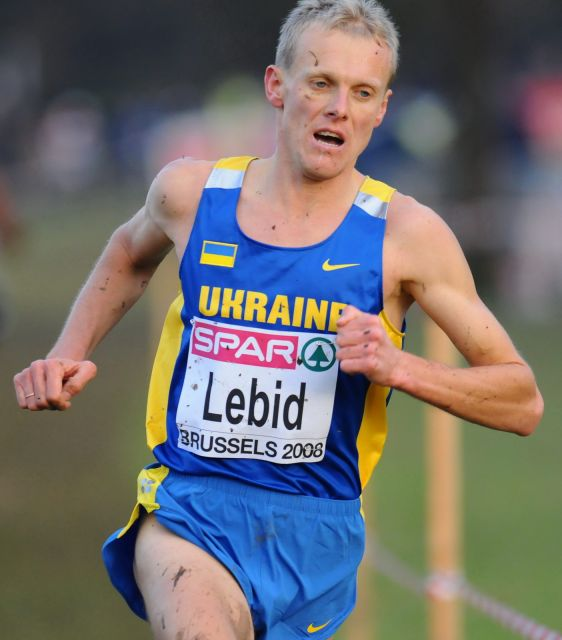
Many-time European champion Serhiy Lebid was the winner in 2005.

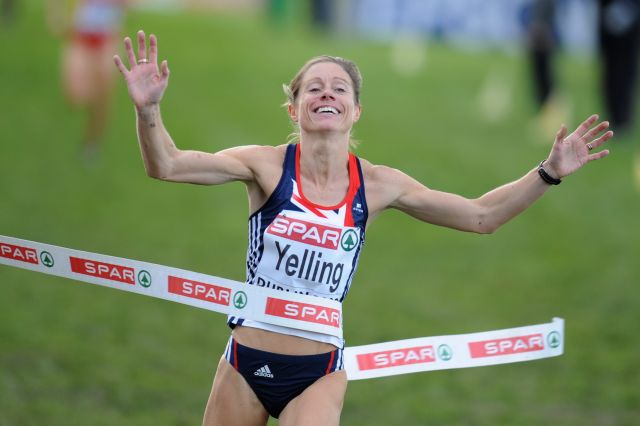
Hayley Yelling is one of four British women to win in San Sebastián.

Edition	Year	Men's winner	Time (m:s)	Women's winner	Time (m:s)
1st	1956	Ken Norris (GBR)	39:37	Not held	
2nd	1957	Antonio Amorás (ESP)	39:19.8	Not held	
3rd	1958	Emil Zátopek (CZE)	39:54.3	Not held	
4th	1959	Alain Mimoun (FRA)	38:38.8	Not held	
5th	1960	Gerald North (GBR)	40:08.8	Not held	
6th	1961	Ali Ben Lahcen (MAR)	41:36.8	Not held	
7th	1962	Rhadi Ben Abdesselam (MAR)	38:51.8	Not held	
8th	1963	Mamo Wolde (ETH)	30:33.4	Not held	
9th	1964	Mamo Wolde (ETH)	29:48.1	Not held	
10th	1965	Mohammed Gammoudi (TUN)	30:44.1	Not held	
11th	1966	Nikolay Dutov (URS)	30:59.3	Not held	
12th	1967	Mamo Wolde (ETH)	31:04.2	Not held	
13th	1968	José Miguel Maíz (ESP)	33:07.6	Not held	
14th	1969	Mike Tagg (GBR)	30:49.4	Not held	
15th	1970	Mike Tagg (GBR)	30:48.0	Not held	
16th	1971	Trevor Wright (GBR)	32:18.1	Zina Boniolo (ITA)	?
17th	1972	Lachlan Stewart (GBR)	32:04.0	Belén Azpeitia (ESP)	?
18th	1973	Dave Bedford (GBR)	33:15.8	Annie van Stiphout (NED)	?
19th	1974	Mariano Haro (ESP)	30:43	Carmen Valero (ESP)	10:06
20th	1975	Mariano Haro (ESP)	31:30.5	Carmen Valero (ESP)	?
21st	1976	Carlos Lopes (POR)	33:57.6	Carmen Valero (ESP)	10:35
22nd	1977	Fernando Fernández (ESP)	30:52	Carmen Valero (ESP)	12.28
23rd	1978	John Wild (GBR)	32:42	Joëlle De Brouwer (FRA)	13:35
24th	1979	Julian Goater (GBR)	31:58	Pilar Fernández (ESP)	13:25
25th	1980	Nathaniel Muir (GBR)	31:06	Christine Benning (GBR)	12:42
26th	1981	José Luis González (ESP)	31:07	Asunción Sinobas (ESP)	13:02
27th	1982	Eshetu Tura (ETH)	31:29	Rosa Mota (POR)	12:53
28th	1983	Mohamed Kedir (ETH)	29:59	Rosa Mota (POR)	12:18
29th	1984	Mohamed Kedir (ETH)	30:21	Rosa Mota (POR)	12:24
30th	1985	Wodajo Bulti (ETH)	31:17.2	Asunción Sinobas (ESP)	12:36.0
31st	1986	Constantino Esparcia (ESP)	?	Jane Shields (GBR)	?
32nd	1987	Paul Kipkoech (KEN)	30:35	Angela Tooby (GBR)	11:32
33rd	1988	John Ngugi (KEN)	31:42	Angelines Rodríguez (ESP)	?
34th	1989	Chala Kelele (ETH)	29:29.2	Jane Shields (GBR)	11:24.0
35th	1990	Paul Bitok (KEN)	?	Jeanne-Marie Pipoz (SUI)	?
36th	1991	Addis Abebe (ETH)	30:09	Susan Sirma (KEN)	18:58
37th	1992	Fita Bayisa (ETH)	29:38	Luchia Yishak (ETH)	18:35
38th	1993	Fita Bayisa (ETH)	29:12	Luchia Yishak (ETH)	18:42
39th	1994	Haile Gebrselassie (ETH)	30:23	Yelena Romanova (RUS)	19:06
40th	1995	Paulo Guerra (POR)	32:13	Elena Fidatov (ROM)	19:50
41st	1996	James Kariuki (KEN)	29:39	Derartu Tulu (ETH)	18:34
42nd	1997	Hillary Korir (KEN)	31:19	Derartu Tulu (ETH)	19:25
43rd	1998	Paulo Guerra (POR)	29:40	Anita Weyermann (SUI)	18:59
44th	1999	Jon Brown (GBR)	31:20	Helena Sampaio (POR)	20:04
45th	2000	Eduardo Henriques (POR)	29:47	Margaret Okayo (KEN)	19:14
46th	2001	Abraham Chebii (KEN)	30:42	Lydia Cheromei (KEN)	19:23
47th	2002	John Yuda (TAN)	28:44	Carla Sacramento (POR)	18:20
48th	2003	Zersenay Tadese (ERI)	32:48	Pamela Chepchumba (KEN)	19:44
49th	2004	Gebre Gebremariam (ETH)	30:48	Dorcus Inzikuru (UGA)	19:45
50th	2005	Serhiy Lebid (UKR)	30:50	Benita Johnson (AUS)	19:01
51st	2006	Zersenay Tadese (ERI)	29:28	Marta Domínguez (ESP)	20:22
52nd	2007	Ibrahim Jeilan (ETH)	29:38	Hayley Yelling (GBR)	17:51
53rd	2008	Josphat Menjo (KEN)	29:50	Eunice Jepkorir (KEN)	17:54
54th	2009	Teklemariam Medhin (ERI)	31:47	Anikó Kálovics (HUN)	18:45
55th	2010	Mike Kigen (KEN)	31:29	Anikó Kálovics (HUN)	19:45
56th	2011	Josphat Menjo (KEN)	31:06	Nuria Fernández (ESP)	18:54
57th	2012	Mike Kigen (KEN)	38:08	Nazareth Weldu (ERI)	27:18
58th	2013	Teklemariam Medhin (ERI)	31:59	Sofia Assefa (ETH)	22:23
59th	2014	Joseph Ebuya (KEN)	32:00	Milcah Cheywa (KEN)	24:21
60th	2015	Teklemariam Medhin (ERI)	30:54	Betsy Saina (KEN)	23:19
61st	2016	Imane Merga (ETH)	28:59	Hiwot Ayalew (ETH)	26:57
62nd	2017	Sadik Mikhou (BHR)	30:01	Bontu Rebitu (BHR)	29:19
63rd	2018	Aweke Ayalew (BHR)	32:54	Daisy Jepkemei (KEN)	27:52
64th	2019	Hassan Chani (BHR)	33:57	Irene Sánchez-Escribano (ESP)	31:40
65th	2021	Rodrigue Kwizera (BDI)	26:56	Zenebu Fikadu (ETH)	25:28
66th	2022	Addisu Yihune (ETH)	25:28	Purity Chepkirui (KEN)	29:08
67th	2023	Ronald Kwemoi (KEN)	26:19	Edinah Jebitok (KEN)	28:39
68th	2024	Santiago Catrofe (URU)	20:10	Diana Chepkemoi (KEN)	23:42
69th	2025	Titus Kibet (KEN)	19:25	Celestine Biwot (KEN)	23:09
70th	2026	Denis Kipkoech (KEN)	20:24	Maurine Chebor (KEN)	24:09

== Victories by nationality ==
Country	Men	Women	Total
Kenya	12	11	23
Ethiopia	16	6	22
Spain	7	12	19
United Kingdom	11	7	18
Portugal	4	5	9
Bahrain	3	1	4
Eritrea	2	1	3
Morocco	2	0	2
France	1	1	2
Russia	1	1	2
Hungary	0	2	2
Switzerland	0	2	2
Burundi	1	0	1
Czech Republic	1	0	1
Tunisia	1	0	1
Ukraine	1	0	1
Australia	0	1	1
Netherlands	0	1	1
Italy	0	1	1
Romania	0	1	1
Uganda	0	1	1
Uruguay	1	0	1
