= Diário Popular =

Portuguese daily newspaper

- Type: Daily newspaper
- Owner: Projectos e Estudos de Imprensa
- Founded: 22 September 1942
- Ceased publication: 1990
- Language: Portuguese
- Headquarters: Lisbon
- Country: Portugal
- Sister newspapers: Record
- ISSN: 0870-1962
- OCLC number: 436532296

Diário Popular was a daily newspaper published in Lisbon, Portugal, between 1942 and 1990.

== History and profile ==
Diário Popular was first published on 22 September 1942. Its headquarters was in Lisbon. It was one of two Portuguese newspapers published in Angola during the colonial rule. The other was Jornal de Notícias. In the 1960s, Diário Popular was acquired by the Balsemão family.

Diário Popular was the organizer of the first journalism program in Portugal which was held in 1966. In the late 1960s, the paper was acquired by the Quina group, a family company. In 1971, it was one of two Portuguese best-selling newspapers.

Diário Popular belonged to the Banco Borges and Irmão, a bank, before the Carnation Revolution. The paper was nationalized following the revolution in 1974 along with other private dailies and publications. It began to adopt a communist stance after its acquisition by the communists in October 1975. In May 1978, the paper had a left-wing political stance.

The paper sold 73,000 copies in October 1975 and 66,000 copies in May 1978.

Diário Popular was privatized in 1989 and was acquired by a company, Projectos e Estudos de Imprensa (PEI), which also became the owner of the sports paper Record. The company was headed by Pedro Santana Lopes, a member of the Social Democratic Party. Diário Popular ceased publication in 1990.
