= Peter Kamais =

Kenyan long-distance runner

Peter Kamais (born 7 November 1976) is a Kenyan long-distance runner who specialises in road running events.

== Career ==
He was the winner at the Oeiras International Cross Country and Almond Blossom Cross Country races in 2006, but it was at the Cursa de Bombers 10K where he established himself, taking consecutive wins in 2006 and 2007. He knocked almost a minute of the course record in 2006 as he crossed the line with a time of 27:29 minutes.

In 2009, he came seventh at the Berlin Half Marathon, going on to win at the Paderborn Easter Run, and then running one of the fastest times of the year at the Tilburg 10K, which he won in 27:09 minutes. This ranked him as the fourth fastest ever over the distance at the time.

He upset the predictions for the 2010 New York City Half Marathon, taking the men's title with his first time under an hour (59:53 minutes) and beating opposition including Haile Gebrselassie and Moses Kigen Kipkosgei. Kamais came second to Gebre Gebremariam at the UAE Healthy Kidney 10K in Central Park in May. He was invited to the 2010 New York City Marathon later that year and he completed his debut over the distance with a time of 2:14:59 hours for twelfth place. He returned to the New York Half in March 2011, but a clash with Galen Rupp upset his run and he ended the race in fifth place. He repeated that placing at the 2011 Beijing Marathon and set a personal best time of 2:12:58 hours in the process.

Kamis set a new personal best time in the 2012 Xiamen International Marathon, winning the race in a course record of 2:07:37.
