= Eunice Jepkorir =

Kenyan long-distance runner

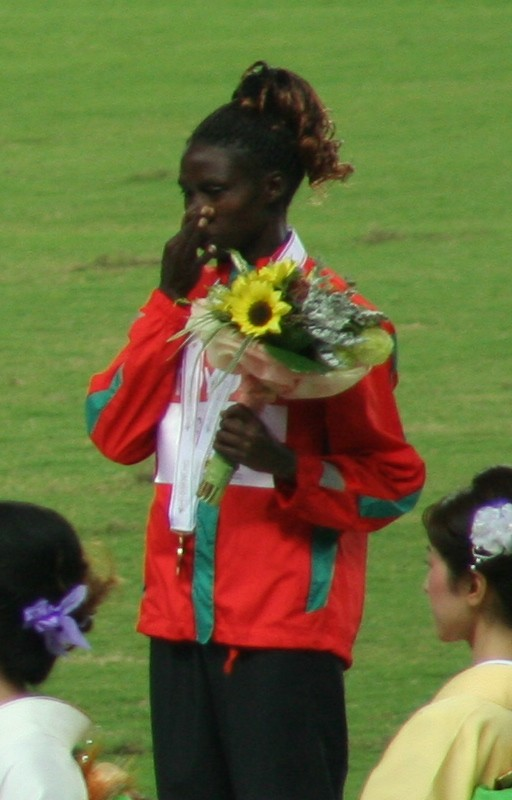
- Eunice Jepkorir at the 2007 World Championships

Medal record

Women's Athletics

Representing Kenya

Olympic Games
Silver medal – second place	2008 Beijing	3000 m steeplechase

World Championships
Bronze medal – third place	2007 Osaka	3000 m steeplechase

Eunice Jepkorir Kertich (born 17 February 1982) is a Kenyan long-distance runner who specialises in the steeplechase. She was the 2008 Olympic silver medalist in the event and bronze medalist at the 2007 World Championships in Athletics.

She is from Eldama Ravine. Her parents are farmers and she has eight siblings (four brothers and four sisters). She started serious running at the age of 15 while at high school. In 2003, she competed at some road races in Germany.

She finished seventh in the long race at the 2004 World Cross Country Championships, while the Kenyan team, of which Jepkorir was a part, won the silver medal in the team competition. She won the Parelloop 10K in race in the Netherlands in 2005. She finished fourteenth at the 2006 World Road Running Championships, helping the Kenyan team win the team competition. She won the 2007 Cross Internacional de la Constitución.

She beat 3000m steeplechase Kenyan record at the Bislett Games in Oslo on 15 June 2007 by running 9:19.44. Two weeks later, on 2 July 2007 in Athens she ran 9:14.52, which is an African and Commonwealth record. The previous African record (9:15.04) was held by Dorcus Inzikuru of Uganda.

At the 2007 World Championships, she won bronze medal in 3000 m steeplechase. She won the 2007 Cursa de Bombers 10K race in Barcelona and defended her title the following year.

On 14 June 2008 she bettered her African record to 9:11.18 in Huelva, Spain. At the 2008 Summer Olympics she won silver medal by running 9:07.41, thus setting a new African record again. She failed to qualify for the 2009 World Championships in Athletics.

She came second behind Nuria Fernández at the 2011 Cross de San Sebastián in January, while her husband took the men's honours. She only competed once on the track that year, winning in Cáceres in June. She did not perform well at the 2012 Kenyan Olympic trials, finishing the race in 10:13.28 minutes and missing the Olympic team as a result.

She is married to Josphat Kiprono Menjo, another Kenyan runner.

== Personal bests ==
- 3000 metres steeplechase - 9:07.41 min (2008)
- 5000 metres - 15:09.05 min (2004)
- 10,000 metres - 32:58.0 min (2003)
