= Reni Pereira =

Brazilian politician (born 1970)

Mayor of Foz do Iguaçu
- In office 1 January 2013 – 14 July 2016
- Preceded by: Paulo Mac Donald
- Succeeded by: Chico Brasileiro

State Deputy for Paraná
- In office 1 January 2002 – 31 December 2012

Personal details
- Born: 13 January 1970 (age 55); Santo Antônio do Sudoeste, PR, Brazil
- Political party: PSB
- Spouse: Claudia Pereira

Reni Clovis de Souza Pereira (born 13 January 1970) is a Brazilian politician as well as a lawyer, banker, and police officer. He has spent his political career representing Paraná, having served in the state legislature from 2012 to 2012 and as mayor of Foz do Iguaçu from 2013 to 2016.

== Personal life ==
At the age of 8, Pereira began working in a mechanical workshop, and in his teens, he was a seminarian for 8 years. He is also a lawyer who graduated from UNIFOZ and holds a postgraduate degree in Tax Law from Faculdades Integradas de Curitiba. He went on a public tender for banking and later joined the teaching profession. In 1993, Pereira moved to Foz do Iguaçu after getting a job with the federal highway police. In 2002, through the recommendation from his friends, he entered the politics.

He is married to Claudia Pereira, former member of the Paraná state legislature, with whom he has three children: Renan, Marina, and Manuela.

== Political career ==
Pereira was first elected to the state legislature in 2002, and was reelected in 2006 and 2010. While in the legislature he helped pass bills that prohibited smoking and lower taxes.

In 2012 Pereira quite the state legislature in order to become mayor. He was elected mayor of Foz do Iguaçu with votes in the 2012 election with 75,289 votes.

In July 2016 Pereira was investigated by federal police as part of Operação Pecúlio on accusations of taking bribes while mayor.
