= Fernando Silva (distance runner) =

Portuguese long-distance runner

Personal information
- Full name: Fernando Sérgio Rigor Silva
- Born: 1 March 1980 (age 45)

Sport
- Country: Portugal
- Club: Sport Lisboa e Benfica

Fernando Sérgio Rigor Silva (born 1 March 1980) is a Portuguese former long-distance runner who competed at distances from 3000 metres to the marathon. He represented his country in the marathon at the 2009 World Championships in Athletics and the 2010 European Athletics Championships. He has also competed at four editions of the World Athletics Cross Country Championships and six editions of the European Cross Country Championships. He shared in a team bronze medal with the Portuguese men at the 2003 European Cross Country Championships. He was twice national champion at the Portuguese Cross Country Championships.

Silva failed a drug test for erythropoietin (EPO), a banned blood-booster, in December 2006, which resulted in his disqualification from the 2006 European Cross Country Championships and a two-year ban. Later he received an 8-year ban from competition in 2014 after failing a doping control based on his biological passport. His ban was backdated to 13 September 2013, with his ban due to expire in 2021.

== International competitions ==
Year	Competition	Venue	Position	Event	Notes
2003	World Cross Country Championships	Lausanne, Switzerland	43rd	Short race	11:55
2003	World Cross Country Championships	Lausanne, Switzerland	13th	Team	163 pts
2003	European Cross Country Championships	Edinburgh, United Kingdom	14th	Senior race	31:36
2003	European Cross Country Championships	Edinburgh, United Kingdom	3rd	Team	57 pts
2004	World Cross Country Championships	Brussels, Belgium	47th	Senior race	38:33
2004	World Cross Country Championships	Brussels, Belgium	13th	Team	234 pts
2004	European Cross Country Championships	Heringsdorf, Germany	11th	Senior race	28:25
2004	European Cross Country Championships	Heringsdorf, Germany	5th	Team	104 pts
2005	World Cross Country Championships	Saint-Galmier, France	46th	Senior race	38:11
2005	World Cross Country Championships	Saint-Galmier, France	8th	Team	212 pts
2005	European 10,000m Cup	Barakaldo, Spain	—	10,000 m	DNF
2005	European Cross Country Championships	Tilburg, Netherlands	11th	Senior race	27:39
2005	European Cross Country Championships	Tilburg, Netherlands	5th	Team	94 pts
2006	World Cross Country Championships	Fukuoka, Japan	25th	Senior race	36:57
2006	World Cross Country Championships	Fukuoka, Japan	7th	Team	152 pts
2006	European 10,000m Cup	Antalya, Turkey	15th	10,000 m	29:10.18
2006	European Cross Country Championships	San Giorgio su Legnano, Italy	—	Senior race	DQ (28:03)
2009	World Championships	Berlin, Germany	13th	Marathon	2:14:48
2009	World Championships	Berlin, Germany	4th	Team	6:42:59
2010	European Championships	Barcelona, Spain	—	Marathon	DNF
2010	European Cross Country Championships	Bydgoszcz, Poland	56th	Senior race	35:21
2010	European Cross Country Championships	Bydgoszcz, Poland	13th	Team	221 pts
2012	European Cross Country Championships	Budapest, Hungary	—	Senior race	DQ

== National titles ==
- Portuguese Cross Country Championships
  - Long course: 2004, 2005

== Personal bests ==
- 3000 m: 8:04.60 min (2005)
- 5000 m: 13:54.60 min (2006)
- 10,000 m: 29:10.18 min (2006)
- Half marathon: 1:02:58 (2009)
- Marathon: 2:12:09 (2009)
- 3000 m steeplechase: 8:49.82 min (2002)

== See also ==
- List of doping cases in athletics
- Portugal at the 2010 European Athletics Championships
- Portugal at the 2009 World Championships in Athletics
