= Yousef el Kalai =

Portuguese long-distance runner

Youssef El Kalay (born 1 March 1981) is a Portuguese long-distance runner who competes for Portugal.

Born in Béni-Mellal, Morocco, El Kalai became a naturalised citizen of Portugal in 2009 and began to compete for his adopted country from 2010. At the Almond Blossom Cross Country in March 2010, he came second behind Kenyan Mark Bett and won the national title as the first Portuguese to finish. He ran at the 2010 IAAF World Cross Country Championships and was Portugal's best performer in 42nd place. He made his championship track debut at the 2010 European Athletics Championships and was eighth in the men's 10,000 metres. He took part in the 2010 European Cross Country Championships in Albufeira and won an individual bronze medal in the senior race as well as the team silver medal.

At the Cinque Mulini in February 2011 he competed for his club, Grupo Deportivo Recreativo Conforlimpia, as part of the European Cross Country Club Championships. He was the runner-up in the race and led his club to the men's team title. At the European Cup 10000m in June, he improved his personal best by ten seconds to win the race in a time of 28:20.03 minutes.

== Achievements ==
Year	Competition	Venue	Position	Event	Notes
Representing Portugal
2010	European Championships	Barcelona, Spain	8th	10,000 m	29:07.61
2010	European Cross Country Championships	Albufeira, Portugal	3rd	Senior race	
2012	European Championships	Helsinki, Finland	DNF	10.000 m	-
