= Passeig de Colom, Barcelona =

Street in Barcelona

Passeig de Colom

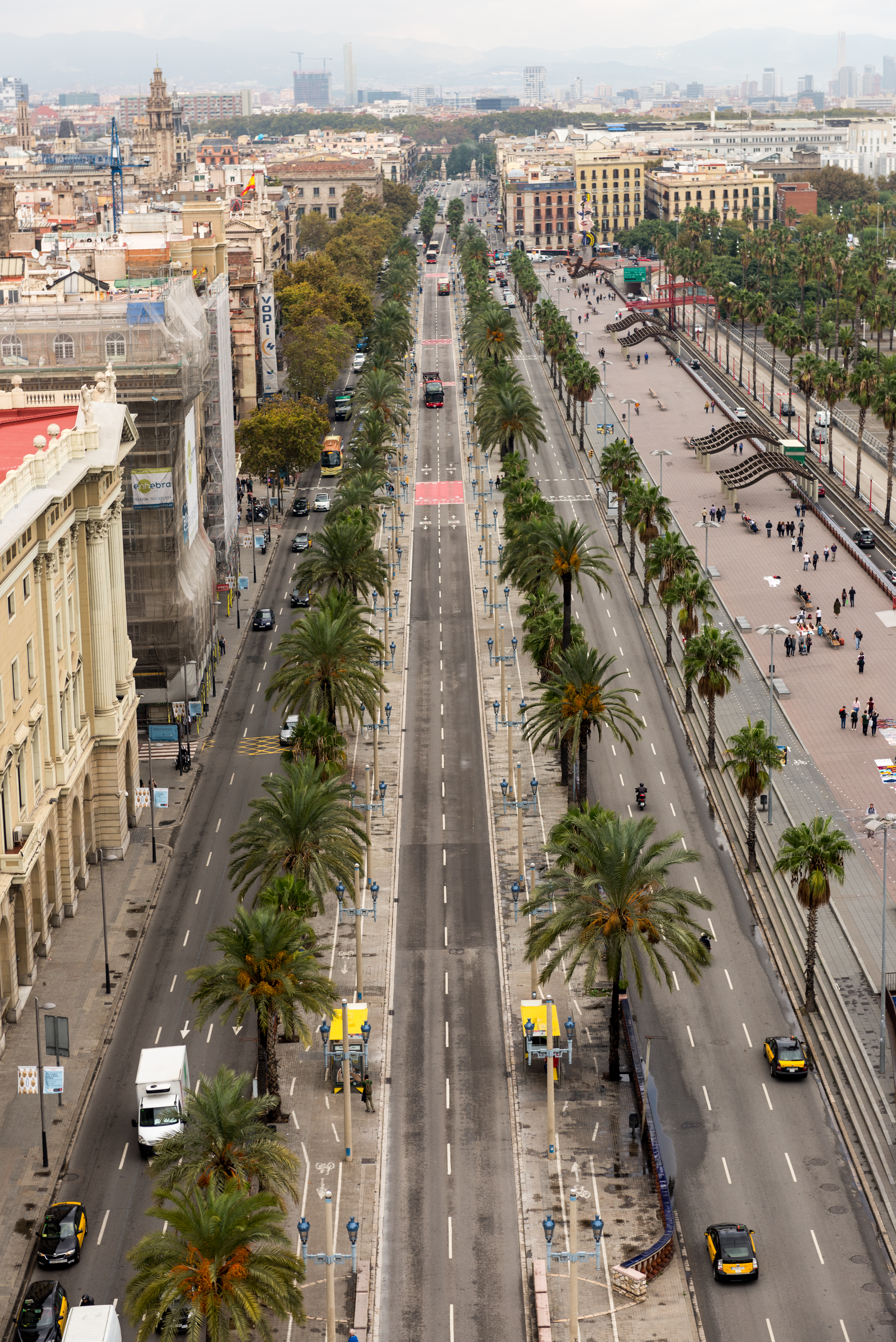
- Looking east along Passeig de Colom.

- The district of Ciutat Vella
- Namesake: Christopher Columbus
- Length: 1.1054 km (0.6869 mi)
- Location: Ciutat Vella, Barcelona, Catalonia, Spain
- Coordinates: 41°22′36″N 2°10′43″E

Construction
- Completion: Constructed in 1878

Passeig de Colom is a wide avenue lined with palm trees in the city of Barcelona, Catalonia, Spain in the Ciutat Vella district.

== History ==
The street runs eastwards from the Columbus monument to the Central Post Office and was constructed from 1878 onwards when the former sea wall was demolished.

== Architecture ==
=== Buildings of interest ===
At number 6 Passeig de Colom is the House of Cervantes, where the famous writer Miguel de Cervantes lodged during his stay in Barcelona. The building dates from the 16th century. In the adjacent square, dedicated to the businessman Antonio López y López, you can find the Central Post Office which was designed by the architects Goda and Torray (1914). Inside the building there are paintings by Francesc Galí and Josep Obiols, which decorate main hall.
