= Claudia Pereira =

Brazilian politician

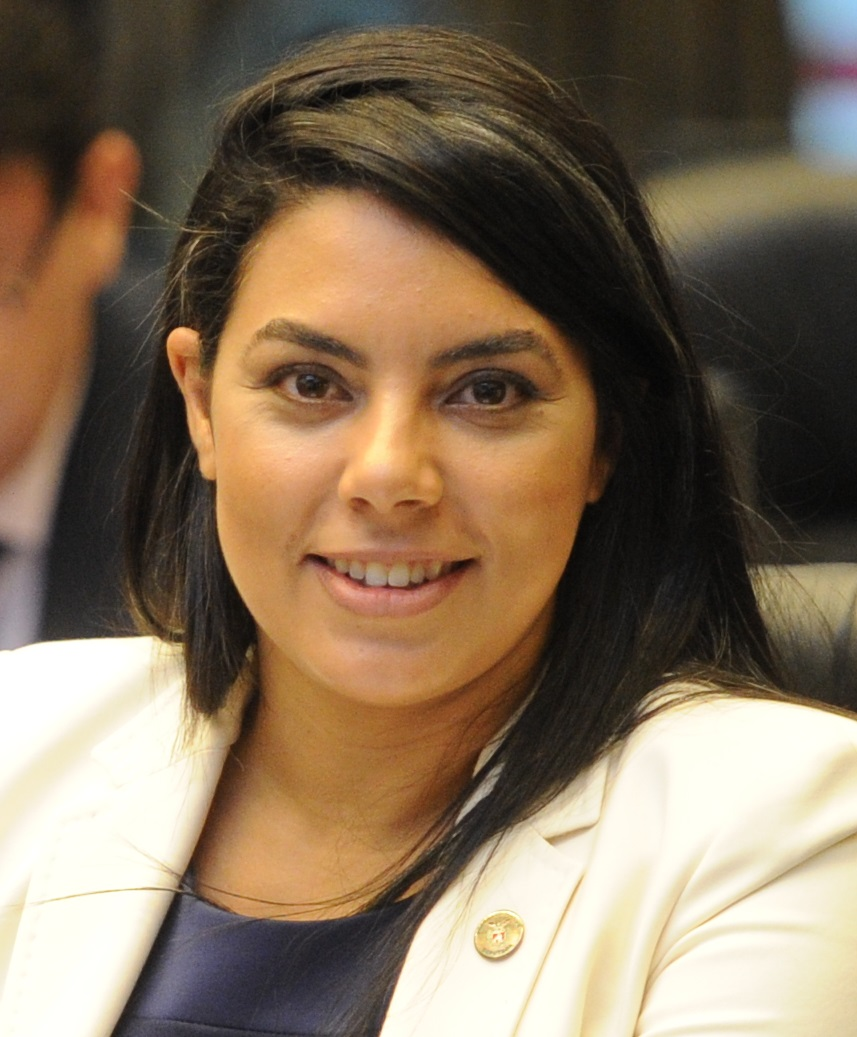
- Pereira in February 2016

State Deputy for Paraná
- In office 1 January 2015 – 31 January 2019

Secretary of Social Assistance for Foz do Iguaçu
- In office 2013–2014

Personal details
- Born: 18 February 1976 (age 50) Ilha Solteira, SP, Brazil
- Party: PSC
- Spouse: Reni Pereira

Claudia Vanessa de Souza Fontoura Pereira (born 18 February 1976) is a Brazilian lawyer and politician. Although born in São Paulo, she has spent her political career representing Paraná, having served in the state legislature from 2015 to 2019.

== Personal life ==
She is married to Reni Pereira, the former mayor of Foz do Iguaçu, with whom she has a daughter: Manuela Fontoura. In addition to becoming a politician she has worked as a lawyer. Pereira is a devout Pentecostal Christian and member of the Christian Congregation in Brazil, and as such does not cut her hair and wears a veil at the church or praying.

== Political career ==
Pereira was appointed by her husband as the secretary of social assistance in the municipality of Foz do Iguaçu for 3 months from 2013 to 2014. In December 2016 Pereira was accused of illegally taking a portion of her husband's campaign expense funds for personal use. Elected to the Paraná state legislature in 2015, Pereira was not able to win reelection in the 2018 elections.

While at office, she focused at social projects and minorities, people with special needs, women rights. In these four years in office, Claudia Pereira has accumulated a collection of accomplishments that includes the presentation of 71 bills, three constitutional amendment proposals, two draft resolutions and 873 requests. 57 of her proposals became law.
