= Josphat Kiprono Menjo =

Kenyan long-distance runner

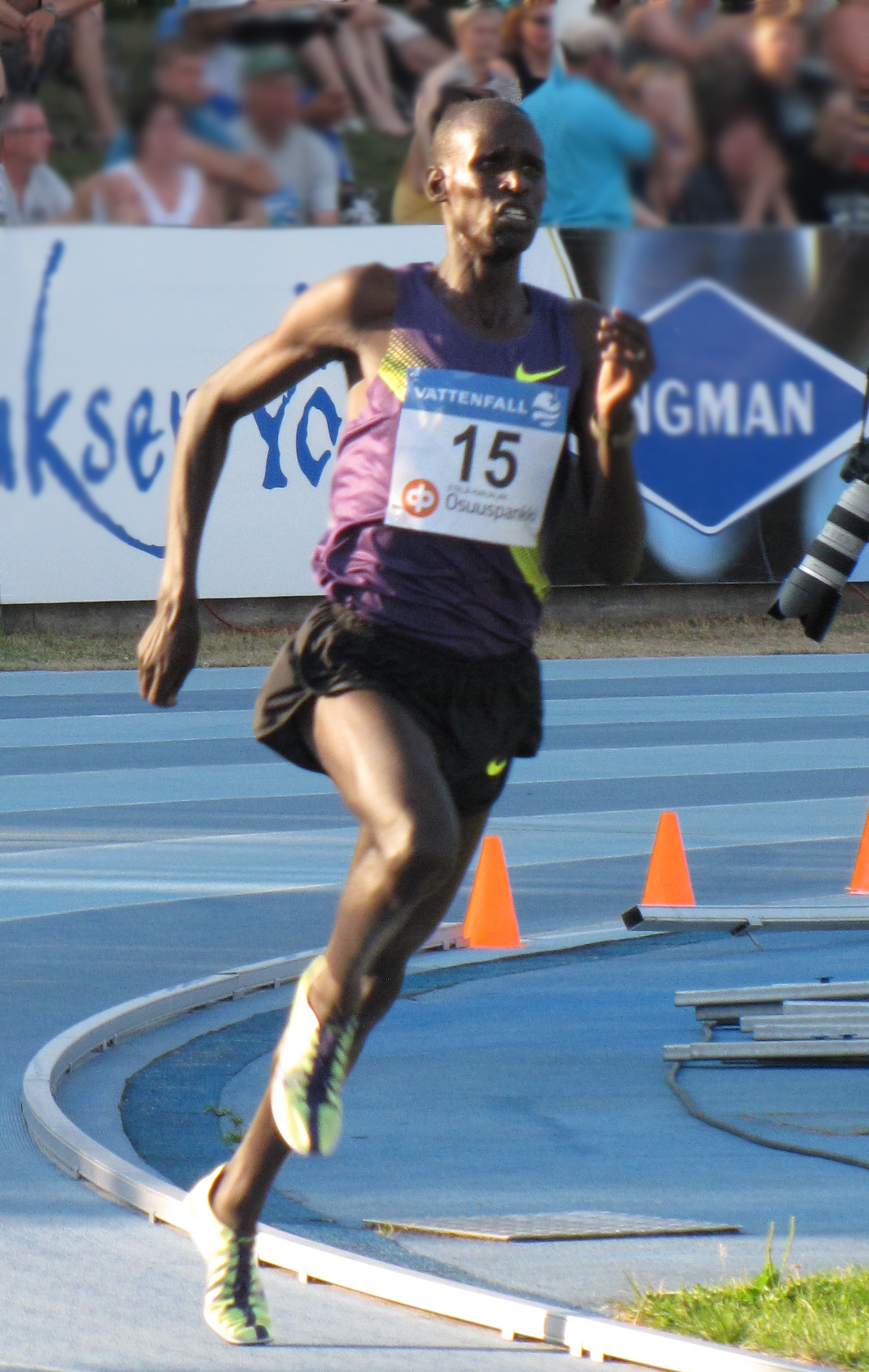
Kiprono Menjo at the 2010 Lappeenranta Games

Josphat Kiprono Menjo (born 20 August 1979) is a Kenyan long-distance runner who specialises in track and road running.

A relative latecomer to athletics, Menjo began competing around 2002 and first represented his country at the 2006 African Championships in Athletics, where he was fifth in the 5000 metres. A silver medal in the event at the 2007 All-Africa Games was followed by an eighth-place finish on the global stage, running in the 10,000 metres at the 2007 World Championships in Athletics. He won the San Silvestre Vallecana 10K race at the end of the year.

He returned to the continental stage with another fifth place at the 2008 African Championships in Athletics and he continued his road success in Spain with consecutive wins at the Cursa de Bombers in 2008 and 2009. Entering into his thirties, Menjo had a career breakthrough in 2010, recording many personal bests: he won the Cursa Bombers in 27:04 minutes to become the joint third fastest over the distance and ran 26:56.74 for the 10,000 m – the fastest by any athlete that year.

== Biography ==
=== Early life and career ===
Born in Kapsabet, Kenya, Josphat Kiprono Menjo was educated at Kapkechui primary school and went on to attend Chemundu secondary school, graduating in 1998. He was keen to further his education and hoped to become a teacher. He worked on his father's maize farm for four years before being called for military service in 2002.

At Moi Airbase, he worked with world-class runners Paul Tergat and Wilson Boit Kipketer and, despite his disinterest in sport as a child, the two convinced Menjo to try his hand at running. He began to compete in various cross country and track meets at military level. He won a 5000 metres provincial race in 2004, gaining qualification into his first national championships. It was this race which sparked the Kenyan's interest: "[I] realised I had potential in the distance and, from then on, I decided to specialise in it".

He experimented with longer distances at the Valladolid Half Marathon and placed third at the 2004 race with a time of 1:04:09. He made the national team for the first time in 2006 with a third-place finish in the 5000 m at the Kenyan championships. Representing his country, he finished fifth in the 5000 m at the 2006 African Championships

=== All-Africa medal ===
His first major international medal came in the 5000 m at the 2007 All-Africa Games, where he took a silver medal behind Moses Kipsiro. Kipsiro had a late surge to pip Menjo to the gold by a margin of .13 seconds. He ran in the 10,000 metres at the 2007 World Championships and finished in eighth place. Menjo won the San Silvestre Vallecana road race on 31 December 2007.

At the 2008 African Championships in Athletics he finished fifth in the 5000 m. He was the winner of the 2008 Cross de San Sebastián and took consecutive victories at the Almond Blossom Cross Country race in 2008 and 2009. He also won twice in a row at the Cursa de Bombers 10K race with wins in 2008 and 2009.

=== Breakthrough year ===
The 2010 season marked a significant improvement in Menjo's performances, as he set a number of career bests in events ranging from 1500 metres to the half marathon. He began by winning his third Cursa de Bombers race in Barcelona clocking 27:04, just three seconds slower than the world record held by compatriot Micah Kogo. This course record mark elevated him to joint third in the all-time rankings over the distance. He ran a 5000 m personal best in Spain later in the outdoor season, winning at the Gran Premio de Andalucía in a time of 13:02.54. He further improved this to 13:00.67 at the KBC Night of Athletics and went on to win at the Lapinlahti leg of the Finnish Elite Games series of meetings in July.

Continuing his rapid improvement, Menjo again lowered his 5000 m personal best to 12:55.95 in Turku, Finland. He ran a 3:53.62 mile in Joensuu, Finland to set a personal best on 22 August 2010. He continued his success in Finland with a win in the Tilastopaja Cup at the Paavo Nurmi Stadium, recording a personal best and world-leading time of 26:56.74. With a highly successful track season behind him, he entered the Portugal Half Marathon in Lisbon and set a personal best of 1:01:42 to take second place behind road specialist Tadese Tola. He signed up for the Belgrade Race Through History in October and broke the meet record, beating Eliud Kipchoge to win on the difficult 6 km course. He was second to Teklemariam Medhin at the Cross Valle de Llodio. He was invited to the Zatopek 10,000 metres and won the race with the fastest time since Luke Kipkosgei's race record run in 1998.

He took his first win on grass in 2011 at the Cross Internacional de San Sebastián in January, then went on to take a comfortable victory at the Almond Blossom Cross Country in March. He did not make the Kenyan teams for the World Championship events that year, but had a season highlight for Kenya at the 2011 Military World Games, where he claimed the 10,000 m title. He returned to the San Sebastián Cross in 2012, but was third on that occasion.

== Personal life ==
He is married to Eunice Jepkorir, a steeplechase runner and Olympic silver medalist. He is related to the similarly named runner Josephat Kiprono, who has won marathons in Berlin, Rome and Rotterdam.

== Personal bests ==
Surface	Event	Time (h:m:s)	Date	Place
Outdoor track	1500 m	3:38.40	15 July 2010	Lappeenranta
Outdoor track	1 mile	3:53.62	22 August 2010	Joensuu
Outdoor track	3000 m	7:44.15	18 July 2009	Zaragoza
Outdoor track	5000 m	12:55.95	18 August 2010	Turku
Outdoor track	10,000 m	26:56.74	29 August 2010	Turku
Road	10 km	27:04	18 April 2010	Barcelona
Road	20 km	57:57	10 October 2021	Paris
Road	half marathon	1:01:28	19 October 2024	Bilbao

- All information taken from IAAF profile.

== Competition record ==
Year	Competition	Venue	Position	Event	Notes
Representing Kenya
2006	African Championships	Bambous, Mauritius	5th	5000 m	14:07.39
2007	All-Africa Games	Algiers, Algeria	2nd	5000 m	13:12.64
2007	World Championships	Osaka, Japan	8th	10,000 m	28:25.67
2008	African Championships	Addis Ababa, Ethiopia	5th	5000 m	13:56.21
2017	World Championships	London, United Kingdom	30th (h)	5000 m	13:35.68

=== Circuit wins ===
- (gold) 2007 San Silvestre Vallecana
- (gold) 2008 Cross de San Sebastián
- (gold) 2008–09 Almond Blossom Cross Country
- (gold) 2008–2010 Cursa de Bombers (course record)
- (gold) 2010 Belgrade Race Through History (course record)
- (gold) 2017 San Silvestre Crevillentina
