= Manuel Damião =

Portuguese Olympic runner

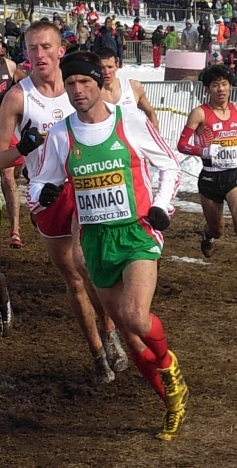
Manuel Damião competing at the 2013 World Cross Country Championships

Manuel Damião (born 4 July 1978) is a Portuguese middle- and long-distance runner. He represented Portugal at the 2004 Summer Olympics. He is a two-time silver medallist at the Ibero-American Championships in Athletics and participated in the IAAF World Cross Country Championships on ten occasions from 1997 to 2011.

He is a member of the Maratona Clube de Portugal and works as a full-time fire fighter in Lisbon

== Career ==
Born in Beja, he started out as a middle-distance runner and ran in the 1500 metres at the 1995 European Youth Olympic Festival and the 1997 European Athletics Junior Championships. He made his junior international debut in cross country running in 1997, ranking 75th in the World Cross Championships and 16th at the European Cross Championships.

Damião's senior breakthrough came in 2000, as he won the silver medal at the 2000 Ibero-American Championships in Athletics (finishing behind Brazil's Hudson de Souza) and came 31st in the short race at the 2000 IAAF World Cross Country Championships. He and de Souza repeated their placings at the 2002 Ibero-American Championships in Athletics. He appeared three more times in the World Cross Country short race in 2004–2006, but did not feature in the top forty.

He made his Olympic debut in the 2004 season after achieving life-time bests on the track of 1:47.64 minutes for the 800 metres and 3:34.37 minutes for the 1500 m. At the 2004 Athens Olympics he reached the semi-finals and was the fastest runner not to reach the 1500 metres final. He also won his first national title that year, taking the cross country short course title. He won the European Cup First League title in the 1500 m in 2005 and 2006. His first appearance at the European Athletics Championships came in 2006 and he was a semi-finalist.

Following the abolition of the short race from the cross country championships, he began to focus on longer distances on grass. He was runner-up at the Almond Blossom Cross Country in 2007 behind multiple continental champion Sergiy Lebid. He won his first international at the 2009 Lusophony Games held in Lisbon, taking the 5000 metres gold medal. He was a regular pick for Portuguese team for the IAAF World Cross Country Championships from 2007 to 2012, with his best performance being 47th place in 2011. He began taking part in road races around 2011 and set a half marathon best of 65:26 minutes at the Portugal Half Marathon that year. He had back-to-back wins at the São Silvestre de Lisboa in 2011 and 2012.

He secured the third national title of his career in 2012 by becoming the long course Portuguese champion at the Almond Blossom Cross Country (finishing third overall in the race). In 2013, he became the first Portuguese man to win the race outright since Damião won the 15K Portuguese road title at the start of 2013 and followed it with a third-place finish for Maratona Clube de Portugal at the European Clubs Cross Country Championships.

== Personal bests ==
- 800 metres – 1:48.73 min (2005)
- 1500 metres – 3:34.37 min (2004)
- Mile run – 4:01.58 min (1999)
- 3000 metres – 7:55.93 min (2003)
- 5000 metres – 13:36.66 min (2009)
- Half marathon – 63:07 min (2008)

All information from IAAF profile
