= Carla Salomé Rocha =

Portuguese long-distance runner

- Rocha in 2013

Personal information
- Nationality: Portuguese
- Born: 25 April 1990 (age 36) Vizela, Portugal
- Height: 1.57 m (5 ft 2 in)
- Weight: 46 kg (101 lb)

Sport
- Country: Portugal
- Sport: Track and field
- Event: 10,000 metres
- Club: Sporting CP
- Coached by: Rui Ferreira

Carla Salomé Rocha (born 25 April 1990) is a Portuguese long-distance runner who competed in the 10,000 metres at the 2016 European Athletics Championships and 2017 World Championships, finishing 28th in the latter competition with a time of 32:52.71. She finished 8th in the 2019 London Marathon with a time of 2:24:47.
