= Manuel Dias (athlete) =

Portuguese athlete

Manuel Dias (born 13 March 1904, date of death unknown) was a Portuguese athlete who competed in the marathon at the 1936 Summer Olympics. He competed for the Portuguese club S.L. Benfica.
