= 2001 in marathon running =

This page lists the World Best Year Performances in the year 2001 in the Marathon for both men and women. One of the main events during this season were the 2001 IAAF World Championships in Edmonton, Alberta, Canada, where the men's competition was held on August 3, 2001. The women had their race on Sunday August 12, 2001.

== Men ==
=== Records ===
Standing records prior to the 2001 season in track and field
World Record	Khalid Khannouchi (MAR)	2:05:42	October 24, 1999	Chicago, United States

=== 2001 World Year Ranking ===
Rank	Time	Athlete	Pos	Venue	Date	Note
1	2:06:50	Josephat Kiprono (KEN)	1	Rotterdam	22 04 2001	
2	2:07:02	Driss El Himer (FRA)	1	Amsterdam	21 10 2001	
3	2:07:06	Abdelkader El Mouaziz (MAR)	1	London	22 04 2001	
4	2:07:18	Kenneth Cheruiyot (KEN)	2	Rotterdam	22 04 2001	
5	2:07:34	Antoni Peña (ESP)	1	Otsu	04 03 2001	
6	2:07:43	Tesfaye Jifar (ETH)	1	New York	04 11 2001	
7	2:07:45	Simretu Alemayehu (ETH)	1	Torino	01 04 2001	
8	2:07:46	Julio Rey (ESP)	1	Hamburg	22 04 2001	
9	2:07:48	Francisco Javier Cortés (ESP)	2	Hamburg	22 04 2001	
10	2:07:52	Giacomo Leone (ITA)	2	Otsu	04 03 2001	
11	2:07:52	Shigeru Aburaya (JPN)	3	Otsu	04 03 2001	
12	2:07:59	Yoshiteru Morishita (JPN)	4	Otsu	04 03 2001	
13	2:08:14	Sammy Korir (KEN)	3	Rotterdam	22 04 2001	
14	2:08:15	Paul Tergat (KEN)	2	London	22 04 2001	
15	2:08:45	Takayuki Nishida (JPN)	1	Ōita	04 02 2001	
16	2:08:47	Joseph Ngolepus (KEN)	1	Berlin	30 09 2001	
17	2:08:51	Stefano Baldini (ITA)	2	Torino	01 04 2001	
18	2:08:52	Hideyuki Obinata (JPN)	5	Otsu	04 03 2001	
19	2:08:52	Benedict Kimondiou (KEN)	1	Chicago	07 10 2001	
20	2:08:56	John Nada Saya (TAN)	1	Milan	02 12 2001	
21	2:08:58	Willy Cheruiyot (KEN)	2	Milan	02 12 2001	
22	2:09:00	Peter Githuka (KEN)	3	Chicago	07 10 2001	
23	2:09:05	Abdellah Béhar (FRA)	4	Rotterdam	22 04 2001	
24	2:09:07	Ottaviano Andriani (ITA)	3	Milan	02 12 2001	
25	2:09:08	Lee Bong-Ju (KOR)	4	Milan	02 12 2001	
26	2:09:19	Japhet Kosgei (KEN)	2	New York	04 11 2001	
27	2:09:25	Gezahegne Abera (ETH)	1	Fukuoka	02 12 2001	
28	2:09:26	Mohamed Ouaadi (FRA)	4	Chicago	07 10 2001	
29	2:09:27	Simon Bor (KEN)	6	Otsu	04 03 2001	
30	2:09:28	Koji Shimizu (JPN)	2	Fukuoka	02 12 2001	
31	2:09:35	Noriaki Igarashi (JPN)	5	Chicago	07 10 2001	
32	2:09:36	António Pinto (POR)	3	London	22 04 2001	
33	2:09:40	Simon Biwott (KEN)	1	Paris	08 04 2001	
34	2:09:40	David Kirui (KEN)	2	Paris	08 04 2001	
35	2:09:41	Toshinari Takaoka (JPN)	3	Fukuoka	02 12 2001	
36	2:09:43	Fred Kiprop (KEN)	3	Paris	08 04 2001	
37	2:09:51	Rodgers Rop (KEN)	3	New York	04 11 2001	
38	2:09:55	William Kiplagat (KEN)	3	Berlin	30 09 2001	
39	2:09:59	Isaac Kiprono (KEN)	5	Rotterdam	22 04 2001	
40	2:10:02	Vanderlei de Lima (BRA)	2	Ōita	04 02 2001	
41	2:10:04	Lee Troop (AUS)	6	Rotterdam	22 04 2001	
42	2:10:06	Tsuyoshi Ogata (JPN)	4	Berlin	30 09 2001	
43	2:10:07	Silvio Guerra (ECU)	2	Boston, Massachusetts	16 04 2001	
44	2:10:07	John Kagwe (KEN)	1	San Diego, California	03 06 2001	
45	2:10:08	Fabián Roncero (ESP)	7	Rotterdam	22 04 2001	
46	2:10:08	Moges Taye (ETH)	1	Venezia	28 10 2001	
47	2:10:10	Henry Tarus (KEN)	2	Venezia	28 10 2001	
48	2:10:11	Gong Ke (CHN)	1	Beijing	14 10 2001	
49	2:10:14	Andrew Sambu (TAN)	1	Prague	20 05 2001	
50	2:10:18	Luke Kibet (KEN)	3	Amsterdam	21 10 2001	
51	2:10:19	David Ngetich (KEN)	2	Prague	20 05 2001	
52	2:10:21	Samson Kandie (KEN)	1	San Sebastián	25 11 2001	
53	2:10:24	Laban Kagika (KEN)	4	Fukuoka	02 12 2001	
54	2:10:25	Li Aiguo (CHN)	2	Beijing	14 10 2001	
55	2:10:26	Wang Yonghua (CHN)	3	Beijing	14 10 2001	
56	2:10:26	Daniele Caimmi (ITA)	3	Venezia	28 10 2001	
57	2:10:28	Luís Novo (POR)	1	Vienna	20 05 2001	
58	2:10:29	Joshua Chelanga (KEN)	3	Boston, Massachusetts	16 04 2001	
59	2:10:29	Sergio Chiesa (ITA)	5	Milan	02 12 2001	
60	2:10:32	Nobuyuki Sato (JPN)	4	Beijing	14 10 2001	
61	2:10:32	Hailu Neguse (ETH)	1	Hofu	16 12 2001	
62	2:10:33	Mohamed Ezzher (FRA)	4	Paris	08 04 2001	
63	2:10:33	Tesfaye Eticha (ETH)	5	Paris	08 04 2001	
64	2:10:33	Óscar Fernández (ESP)	8	Rotterdam	22 04 2001	
65	2:10:35	Danilo Goffi (ITA)	5	Berlin	30 09 2001	
66	2:10:36	Shinji Kawashima (JPN)	3	Ōita	04 02 2001	
67	2:10:36	Kamal Ziani (ESP)	9	Rotterdam	22 04 2001	
68	2:10:36	Frederick Chumba (KEN)	6	Berlin	30 09 2001	
69	2:10:36	Salaho Ngadi (TAN)	4	Venezia	28 10 2001	
70	2:10:37	Ambesse Tolosa (ETH)	5	Beijing	14 10 2001	
71	2:10:38	Zhan Donglin (CHN)	6	Beijing	14 10 2001	
72	2:10:38	Daniel Kirwa Too (KEN)	1	Firenze	25 11 2001	
73	2:10:41	Robert Cheruiyot (KEN)	10	Rotterdam	22 04 2001	
74	2:10:41	Mark Saina (KEN)	5	Venezia	28 10 2001	
75	2:10:41	Xavier Caballero (ESP)	6	Milan	02 12 2001	
76	2:10:44	James Moiben (KEN)	11	Rotterdam	22 04 2001	
77	2:10:45	Koen Allaert (BEL)	12	Rotterdam	22 04 2001	
78	2:10:45	Ashebir Demissie (ETH)	4	Amsterdam	21 10 2001	
79	2:10:46	Mark Steinle (GBR)	6	London	22 04 2001	
80	2:10:46	Li Zhuhong (CHN)	7	Beijing	14 10 2001	
81	2:10:47	Makhosonke Fika (RSA)	7	Berlin	30 09 2001	
82	2:10:47	Jonathan Cherono (KEN)	8	Beijing	14 10 2001	
83	2:10:49	José Ramón Rey (ESP)	1	Sevilla	25 02 2001	
84	2:10:51	Kenichi Takahashi (JPN)	1	Tokyo	18 02 2001	
85	2:10:54	Viktor Röthlin (SUI)	8	Berlin	30 09 2001	
86	2:10:57	Andrés Espinosa (MEX)	1	Torreón	04 03 2001	
87	2:10:58	Benjamín Paredes (MEX)	2	Torreón	04 03 2001	
88	2:10:58	Nelson Ndereva Njeru (KEN)	9	Beijing	14 10 2001	
89	2:11:01	Takayuki Shimazaki (JPN)	10	Beijing	14 10 2001	
90	2:11:04	Simon Lopuyet (KEN)	3	Hamburg	22 04 2001	
91	2:11:04	Migidio Bourifa (ITA)	6	Venezia	28 10 2001	
92	2:11:05	Barnabas Rutto (KEN)	4	Prague	20 05 2001	
93	2:11:06	Abdelhakim Bagy (FRA)	7	Paris	08 04 2001	
94	2:11:09	Dmitriy Kapitonov (RUS)	3	Tokyo	18 02 2001	
95	2:11:09	Pavel Loskutov (EST)	1	Frankfurt	28 10 2001	
96	2:11:11	Eliud Keiring (KEN)	5	Prague	20 05 2001	
97	2:11:12	Zebedayo Bayo (TAN)	4	Tokyo	18 02 2001	
98	2:11:14	Shigekatsu Kondo (JPN)	4	Ōita	04 02 2001	
99	2:11:18	Hendrick Ramaala (RSA)	5	New York	04 11 2001	
100	2:11:19	Roberto Barbi (ITA)	1	Trieste	06 05 2001	

== Women ==
=== Records ===
Standing records prior to the 2001 season in track and field
World Record	Tegla Loroupe (KEN)	2:20:43	September 26, 1999	Berlin, Germany
Broken records during the 2001 season in track and field
World Record	Naoko Takahashi (JPN)	2:19:46	September 30, 2001	Berlin, Germany
World Record	Catherine Ndereba (KEN)	2:18:47	October 7, 2001	Chicago, United States

=== 2001 World Year Ranking ===
Rank	Time	Athlete	Venue	Rank	Date	Note
1	2:18:47	Catherine Ndereba (KEN)	Chicago, United States	1	07-10-2001	WR
2	2:19:46	Naoko Takahashi (JPN)	Berlin, Germany	1	30-09-2001	WR
3	2:23:11	Yoko Shibui (JPN)	Osaka, Japan	1	28-01-2001	
4	2:23:37	Min Liu (CHN)	Beijing, PR China	1	14-10-2001	
5	2:23:57	Derartu Tulu (ETH)	London, United Kingdom	1	22-04-2001	
6	2:24:02	Wei Yanan (CHN)	Beijing, PR China	2	14-10-2001	
7	2:24:04	Svetlana Zakharova (RUS)	London, United Kingdom	2	22-04-2001	
8	2:24:12	Joyce Chepchumba (KEN)	London, United Kingdom	3	22-04-2001	
9	2:24:15	Lidia Șimon (ROM)	London, United Kingdom	4	22-04-2001	
10	2:24:21	Margaret Okayo (KEN)	New York, United States	1	04-11-2001	
11	2:24:22	Ren Xiujuan (CHN)	Beijing, PR China	3	14-10-2001	
12	2:24:29	Elfenesh Alemu (ETH)	London, United Kingdom	5	22-04-2001	
13	2:24:41	Dai Yanyan (CHN)	Beijing, PR China	4	14-10-2001	
14	2:24:42	Zhang Shujing (CHN)	Beijing, PR China	5	14-10-2001	
15	2:25:12	Susan Chepkemei (KEN)	New York, United States	2	04-11-2001	
16	2:25:18	Nuţa Olaru (ROM)	London, United Kingdom	6	22-04-2001	
17	2:25:29	Irina Timofeyeva (RUS)	Tokyo, Japan	2	18-11-2001	
18	2:25:34	Alina Ivanova (RUS)	London, United Kingdom	7	22-04-2001	
19	2:25:35	Bruna Genovese (ITA)	Tokyo, Japan	3	18-11-2001	
20	2:25:48	Li Jin (CHN)	Beijing, PR China	6	14-10-2001	
21	2:25:56	Zheng Guixia (CHN)	Beijing, PR China	7	14-10-2001	
22	2:26:01	Kazumi Matsuo (JPN)	Nagoya, Japan	1	11-03-2001	
23	2:26:01	Luminița Zaituc (GER)	Frankfurt, Germany	1	28-10-2001	
24	2:26:04	Takami Ominami (JPN)	Nagoya, Japan	2	11-03-2001	
25	2:26:04	Kerryn McCann (AUS)	Chicago, United States	3	07-10-2001	
26	2:26:06	Reiko Tosa (JPN)	Edmonton, Canada	2	12-08-2001	
27	2:26:08	Małgorzata Sobańska (POL)	Chicago, United States	4	07-10-2001	
28	2:26:10	Tegla Loroupe (KEN)	London, United Kingdom	8	22-04-2001	
29	2:26:13	Sonja Oberem (GER)	Hamburg, Germany	1	22-04-2001	
30	2:26:15	Esther Kiplagat (KEN)	New York, United States	5	04-11-2001	
31	2:26:18	Lyudmila Petrova (RUS)	New York, United States	6	04-11-2001	
32	2:26:21	Yukiko Okamoto (JPN)	Nagoya, Japan	3	11-03-2001	
33	2:26:22	Adriana Fernández (MEX)	London, United Kingdom	9	22-04-2001	
34	2:26:31	Maura Viceconte (ITA)	Prague, Czech Republic	1	20-05-2001	
35	2:26:33	Alice Chelangat (KEN)	Milan, Italy	1	02-12-2001	
36	2:26:39	Constantina Tomescu (ROM)	Tokyo, Japan	4	18-11-2001	
37	2:26:42	Franca Fiacconi (ITA)	Osaka, Japan	2	28-01-2001	
38	2:26:51	Zinaida Semenova (RUS)	St. Paul, United States	1	07-10-2001	Personal Best
39	2:26:58	Deena Drossin (USA)	New York, United States	7	04-11-2001	
40	2:27:01	Noriko Geji (JPN)	Nagoya, Japan	4	11-03-2001	
41	2:27:01	Tomoe Abe (JPN)	Nagoya, Japan	5	11-03-2001	
42	2:27:14	Madina Biktagirova (RUS)	London, United Kingdom	10	22-04-2001	
43	2:27:16	Ikuyo Goto (JPN)	Nagoya, Japan	6	11-03-2001	
44	2:27:18	Lyubov Morgunova (RUS)	Boston, United States	3	16-04-2001	
45	2:27:22	Mayumi Ichikawa (JPN)	Nagoya, Japan	7	11-03-2001	
46	2:27:22	Fatuma Roba (ETH)	San Diego, United States	2	03-06-2001	
47	2:27:37	Olga Kovpotina (RUS)	St. Paul, United States	2	07-10-2001	
48	2:27:44	Ikumi Nagayama (JPN)	Nagoya, Japan	8	11-03-2001	
49	2:27:50	Rie Matsuoka (JPN)	Osaka, Japan	3	28-01-2001	
50	2:27:53	Florence Barsosio (KEN)	Paris, France	1	08-04-2001	
51	2:27:54	Tiziana Alagia (ITA)	Turin, Italy	1	01-04-2001	
52	2:27:54	Ruth Kutol (KEN)	Paris, France	2	08-04-2001	
53	2:27:56	Lornah Kiplagat (KEN)	Boston, United States	4	16-04-2001	
54	2:28:00	Lu Jingbo (CHN)	Beijing, PR China	8	14-10-2001	
55	2:28:09	Naomi Sakashita (JPN)	Nagoya, Japan	9	11-03-2001	
56	2:28:13	Junko Akagi (JPN)	Tokyo, Japan	6	18-11-2001	
57	2:28:17	Jong Yong-Ok (PRK)	Beijing, PR China	9	14-10-2001	
58	2:28:22	Silviya Skvortsova (RUS)	St. Paul, United States	3	07-10-2001	
59	2:28:27	Aki Fujikawa (JPN)	Nagoya, Japan	10	11-03-2001	
60	2:28:27	Kathrin Weßel (GER)	Berlin, Germany	3	30-09-2001	
61	2:28:28	Masako Koide (JPN)	Rotterdam, Netherlands	2	22-04-2001	
62	2:28:31	Marleen Renders (BEL)	London, United Kingdom	11	22-04-2001	
63	2:28:40	Shitaye Gemechu (ETH)	Edmonton, Canada	7	12-08-2001	
64	2:28:40	Valentina Yegorova (RUS)	Nagoya, Japan	11	11-03-2001	
65	2:28:59	Nives Curti (ITA)	Chicago, United States	5	07-10-2001	
66	2:29:01	Harumi Hiroyama (JPN)	London, United Kingdom	12	22-04-2001	
67	2:29:03	Zhao Shengzhi (CHN)	Beijing, PR China	10	14-10-2001	
68	2:29:16	Alina Gherasim (ROM)	Paris, France	3	08-04-2001	
69	2:29:16	Sun Yingjie (CHN)	Beijing, PR China	11	14-10-2001	
70	2:29:18	Yoshiko Ichikawa (JPN)	Tokyo, Japan	8	18-11-2001	
71	2:29:19	Tomoko Kai (JPN)	Nagoya, Japan	12	11-03-2001	
72	2:29:35	Ornella Ferrara (ITA)	San Diego, United States	3	03-06-2001	
73	2:29:44	Ham Bong-Sil (PRK)	Pyongyang, North Korea	2	15-04-2001	
74	2:29:44	Cristiana Pomacu (ROM)	Belgrade, Serbia	1	21-04-2001	
75	2:29:46	Sara Ferrari (ITA)	Turin, Italy	2	01-04-2001	
76	2:29:46	María Abel (ESP)	Rotterdam, Netherlands	3	22-04-2001	
77	2:29:57	Lidiya Vasilevskaya (RUS)	St. Paul, United States	4	07-10-2001	
78	2:29:58	Zahia Dahmani (FRA)	Paris, France	4	08-04-2001	
79	2:30:00	Jane Salumäe (EST)	Vienna, Austria	1	20-05-2001	
80	2:30:03	Yelena Paramonova (RUS)	New York, United States	8	04-11-2001	
81	2:30:11	María Luisa Larraga (ESP)	Valencia, Spain	1	04-02-2001	
82	2:30:15	Elżbieta Jarosz (POL)	St. Paul, United States	5	07-10-2001	
83	2:30:22	Ju Limei (CHN)	Beijing, PR China	12	14-10-2001	
84	2:30:25	Nadezhda Wijenberg (NED)	Rotterdam, Netherlands	4	22-04-2001	
85	2:30:25	Wang Yanrong (CHN)	Beijing, PR China	13	14-10-2001	
86	2:30:28	Tatyana Pozdnyakova (UKR)	Providence, USA	1	08-10-2001	
87	2:30:30	Yukari Komatsu (JPN)	Nagoya, Japan	13	11-03-2001	
88	2:30:35	Tian Mei (CHN)	Beijing, PR China	14	14-10-2001	
89	2:30:39	Masako Chiba (JPN)	Sapporo, Japan	1	26-08-2001	
90	2:30:42	Maria Guida (ITA)	Rome, Italy	1	25-03-2001	
91	2:30:46	Jo Bun-Hui (PRK)	Pyongyang, North Korea	3	15-04-2001	
92	2:30:50	Ai Sugihara (JPN)	Nagoya, Japan	14	11-03-2001	
93	2:30:55	Rosaria Console (ITA)	Padova, Italy	1	29-04-2001	
94	2:30:56	Eva Sanz (ESP)	Rotterdam, Netherlands	5	22-04-2001	
95	2:30:58	Firiya Sultanova-Zhdanova (RUS)	Edmonton, Canada	12	12-08-2001	
96	2:31:00	Yuko Arimori (JPN)	Tokyo, Japan	10	18-11-2001	
97	2:31:01	Claudia Dreher (GER)	Lisbon, Portugal	1	02-12-2001	
98	2:31:02	Irina Bogachova (KGZ)	St. Paul, United States	6	07-10-2001	
99	2:31:05	Li Helan (CHN)	Jinan, PR China	2	07-04-2001	
100	2:31:05	Griselda González (ESP)	Rotterdam, Netherlands	6	22-04-2001	
