= 2002 in marathon running =

This page lists the World Best Year Performances in the year 2002 in the Marathon for both men and women. One of the main title events during this season were the 2002 European Athletics Championships in Munich, Germany. The world record was broken in both the men's and the women's competition.

== Men ==
=== Records ===
Standing records prior to the 2002 season in track and field
World Record	Khalid Khannouchi (MAR)	2:05:42	October 24, 1999	Chicago, United States
Broken records during the 2002 season in track and field
World Record	Khalid Khannouchi (USA)	2:05:38	April 14, 2002	London, United Kingdom

=== 2002 World Year Ranking ===
Rank	Time	Athlete	Birthdate	Pos	Venue	Date	Note
1	2:05:38	Khalid Khannouchi (USA)	22 12 1971	1	London	14 04 2002	WR
2	2:05:48	Paul Tergat (KEN)	17 06 1969	2	London	14 04 2002	
3	2:06:16	Daniel Njenga (KEN)	07 05 1976	2	Chicago	13 10 2002	
4	2:06:16	Toshinari Takaoka (JPN)	24 09 1970	3	Chicago	13 10 2002	
5	2:06:35	Haile Gebrselassie (ETH)	18 04 1973	3	London	14 04 2002	
6	2:06:46	Abdelkader El Mouaziz (MAR)	01 01 1969	5	Chicago	13 10 2002	
7	2:06:47	Raymond Kipkoech (KEN)	1975	1	Berlin	29 09 2002	
8	2:06:49	Simon Biwott (KEN)	03 03 1970	2	Berlin	29 09 2002	
9	2:06:52	Vincent Kipsos (KEN)	22 06 1976	3	Berlin	29 09 2002	
10	2:07:06	Ian Syster (RSA)	20 01 1976	5	London	14 04 2002	
11	2:07:26	Benjamin Kimutai (KEN)	05 09 1971	1	Amsterdam	20 10 2002	
12	2:07:29	Stefano Baldini (ITA)	25 05 1971	6	London	14 04 2002	
13	2:07:50	Boniface Usisivu (KEN)	05 09 1974	4	Berlin	29 09 2002	
14	2:07:55	Simon Bor (KEN)	13 02 1969	2	Amsterdam	20 10 2002	
15	2:07:59	Steven Matebo (KEN)	30 03 1974	3	Amsterdam	20 10 2002	
16	2:08:07	Rodgers Rop (KEN)	16 02 1976	1	New York	03 11 2002	
17	2:08:08	Antoni Peña (ESP)	26 08 1970	4	Amsterdam	20 10 2002	
18	2:08:10	Sammy Korir (KEN)	12 12 1971	5	Amsterdam	20 10 2002	
19	2:08:16	Hailu Negussie (ETH)	16 04 1978	1	Hofu	15 12 2002	
20	2:08:17	Christopher Cheboiboch (KEN)	03 03 1977	2	New York	03 11 2002	
21	2:08:18	Benoît Zwierzchiewski (FRA)	19 08 1976	1	Paris	07 04 2002	
22	2:08:25	Jimmy Muindi (KEN)	14 08 1973	5	Berlin	29 09 2002	
23	2:08:35	Ryuji Takei (JPN)	18 05 1971	1	Otsu	03 03 2002	
24	2:08:39	Laban Kipkemboi (KEN)	30 12 1977	3	New York	03 11 2002	
25	2:08:43	Erick Wainaina (KEN)	19 12 1973	1	Tokyo	10 02 2002	
26	2:08:44	Boaz Kimaiyo (KEN)	10 12 1976	6	Amsterdam	20 10 2002	
27	2:08:49	David Makori (KEN)	06 11 1973	1	Venezia	27 10 2002	
28	2:08:53	Pavel Loskutov (EST)	02 12 1969	2	Paris	07 04 2002	
29	2:08:53	Mohamed Ouaadi (FRA)	01 01 1969	4	New York	03 11 2002	
30	2:08:59	Alberto Juzdado (ESP)	20 08 1966	2	Tokyo	10 02 2002	
31	2:08:59	Robert Kipkoech Cheruiyot (KEN)	26 09 1978	1	Milan	01 12 2002	
32	2:08:59	Michael Rotich (KEN)	26 10 1978	2	Milan	01 12 2002	
33	2:08:59	Daniele Caimmi (ITA)	17 12 1972	3	Milan	01 12 2002	
34	2:09:07	Migidio Bourifa (ITA)	31 01 1969	3	Paris	07 04 2002	
35	2:09:08	Fred Kiprop (KEN)	03 06 1974	3	Otsu	03 03 2002	
36	2:09:10	Toshinari Suwa (JPN)	29 01 1977	4	Otsu	03 03 2002	
37	2:09:10	António Pinto (POR)	22 03 1966	7	London	14 04 2002	
38	2:09:13	Gezahegne Abera (ETH)	23 04 1978	1	Fukuoka	01 12 2002	
39	2:09:15	Tsuyoshi Ogata (JPN)	11 05 1973	2	Fukuoka	01 12 2002	
40	2:09:17	Mark Steinle (GBR)	22 11 1974	8	London	14 04 2002	
41	2:09:18	Takeshi Hamano (JPN)	30 07 1974	5	Otsu	03 03 2002	
42	2:09:22	Peter Chebet Kiprono (KEN)	24 06 1974	4	Milan	01 12 2002	
43	2:09:34	Timothy Cherigat (KEN)	29 12 1976	1	San Sebastián	24 11 2002	
44	2:09:38	Satoshi Osaki (JPN)	04 06 1976	2	Hofu	15 11 2002	
45	2:09:39	Robert Cheruiyot (KEN)	20 12 1974	4	Paris	07 04 2002	
46	2:09:41	Alan Culpepper (USA)	15 09 1972	6	Chicago	13 10 2002	
47	2:09:43	Kenneth Cheruiyot (KEN)	02 08 1974	2	Rotterdam	21 04 2002	
48	2:09:45	Mbarak Hussein (KEN)	04 04 1965	4	Boston	15 04 2002	
49	2:09:48	Ji Young-Joon (KOR)	15 12 1981	3	Seoul	03 11 2002	
50	2:09:50	Tesfaye Jifar (ETH)	23 04 1976	9	London	14 04 2002	
51	2:09:51	Tereje Wodajo (ETH)	27 01 1982	4	Seoul	03 11 2002	
52	2:09:51	Josephat Kiprono (KEN)	12 12 1973	5	Seoul	03 11 2002	
53	2:09:54	Rachid Ziar (ALG)	15 11 1973	5	Paris	07 04 2002	
54	2:09:55	José Manuel Martínez (ESP)	22 10 1971	3	Rotterdam	21 04 2002	
55	2:09:56	Tesfaye Tola (ETH)	19 10 1974	6	Seoul	03 11 2002	
56	2:09:58	David Busienei (KEN)	22 12 1974	2	San Sebastián	24 11 2002	
57	2:09:59	Daniel Kirwa (KEN)	21 11 1976	1	Carpi	06 10 2002	
58	2:10:02	John Kagwe (KEN)	09 01 1969	7	Chicago	13 10 2002	
59	2:10:02	Martin Lel (KEN)	29 10 1978	2	Venezia	27 10 2002	
60	2:10:05	Josia Thugwane (RSA)	15 04 1971	7	Seoul	03 11 2002	
61	2:10:06	Hendrick Ramaala (RSA)	02 02 1972	6	Paris	07 04 2002	
62	2:10:06	Abdellah Béhar (FRA)	05 07 1963	7	Paris	07 04 2002	
63	2:10:06	Moges Taye (ETH)	12 11 1973	3	Venezia	27 10 2002	
64	2:10:09	Ambesse Tolosa (ETH)	28 08 1977	7	Amsterdam	20 10 2002	
65	2:10:09	Kim Yi-Yong (KOR)	20 09 1973	8	Seoul	03 11 2002	
66	2:10:10	Matthew Sigei (KEN)	1983	8	Amsterdam	20 10 2002	
67	2:10:12	Willy Cheruiyot Kipkirui (KEN)	24 08 1974	1	Eindhoven	13 10 2002	
68	2:10:14	Tesfaye Eticha (ETH)	16 09 1974	8	Paris	07 04 2002	
69	2:10:17	Toshihiro Iwasa (JPN)	18 05 1976	6	Otsu	03 03 2002	
70	2:10:17	Christopher Kandie (KEN)	1969	1	Hamburg	21 04 2002	
71	2:10:22	Philip Tarus (KEN)	11 09 1974	4	Venezia	27 10 2002	
72	2:10:25	Moses Tanui (KEN)	20 08 1965	1	Vienna	26 05 2002	
73	2:10:27	Stephen Ndungu (KEN)	01 06 1967	1	Los Angeles	03 03 2002	
74	2:10:27	Alberico Di Cecco (ITA)	19 04 1974	1	Torino	21 04 2002	
75	2:10:30	Lee Bong-Ju (KOR)	11 10 1970	5	Boston	15 04 2002	
76	2:10:31	Kazuhiro Matsuda (JPN)	24 06 1974	6	Berlin	29 09 2002	
77	2:10:39	José Ernani Palalia (MEX)	03 12 1972	7	Berlin	29 09 2002	
78	2:10:39	Henry Serem (KEN)		4	San Sebastián	24 11 2002	
79	2:10:39	Ruggero Pertile (ITA)	08 08 1974	5	Milan	01 12 2002	
80	2:10:40	Larbi Zeroual (FRA)	10 01 1971	9	Paris	07 04 2002	
81	2:10:40	Elias Chebet (KEN)	1974	6	Boston	15 04 2002	
82	2:10:41	Elijah Mutai (KEN)	24 09 1978	9	Berlin	29 09 2002	
83	2:10:42	Mark Saina (KEN)	10 11 1970	3	Hamburg	21 04 2002	
84	2:10:48	Joseph Kahugu (KEN)	07 06 1971	4	Rotterdam	21 04 2002	
85	2:10:48	Frederick Chumba (KEN)	24 07 1974	2	Carpi	06 10 2002	
86	2:10:49	Grzegorz Gajdus (POL)	16 01 1967	2	Eindhoven	13 10 2002	
87	2:10:50	Douglas Rono (KEN)	29 12 1974	3	Eindhoven	13 10 2002	
88	2:10:51	Ernest Kipyego (KEN)	06 10 1978	1	Köln	06 10 2002	
89	2:10:52	Danilo Goffi (ITA)	03 12 1972	2	Torino	21 04 2002	
90	2:10:53	Barnabas Kipngetich (KEN)	19 04 1977	3	Vienna	26 05 2002	
91	2:10:54	Mark Carroll (IRL)	15 01 1972	6	New York	03 11 2002	
92	2:10:55	Mark Yatich (KEN)	04 12 1976	10	Berlin	29 09 2002	
93	2:10:57	Elly Rono (KEN)	10 08 1970	1	Duluth	22 06 2002	
94	2:10:59	Luc Krotwaar (NED)	25 01 1968	5	Rotterdam	21 04 2002	
95	2:11:00	Sergio Chiesa (ITA)	07 09 1972	3	Torino	21 04 2002	
96	2:11:03	Masayoshi Koide (JPN)	06 11 1972	7	Otsu	03 03 2002	
97	2:11:04	Francis Kipketer (KEN)	17 04 1976	9	Seoul	03 11 2002	
98	2:11:07	Aleksandr Kuzin (UKR)	21 10 1974	3	Carpi	06 10 2002	
99	2:11:08	Ezael Thlobo (RSA)	04 05 1964	11	Berlin	29 09 2002	
100	2:11:08	David Kosgei (KEN)	1976	5	Venice	27 10 2002	

== Women ==
=== Records ===
Standing records prior to the 2002 season in track and field
World Record	Catherine Ndereba (KEN)	2:18:47	October 7, 2001	Chicago, United States
Broken records during the 2001 season in track and field
World Record	Paula Radcliffe (GBR)	2:17:18	October 13, 2002	Chicago, United States

=== 2002 World Year Ranking ===
Rank	Time	Athlete	Birthdate	Venue	Rank	Date	Note
1	2:17:18	Paula Radcliffe (GBR)	17 12 1973	1	Chicago	13 10 2002	WR
2	2:19:26	Catherine Ndereba (KEN)	21 07 1972	2	Chicago	13 10 2002	
3	2:20:23	Wei Yanan (CHN)	06 12 1980	1	Beijing	20 10 2002	
4	2:20:43	Margaret Okayo (KEN)	30 05 1976	1	Boston	15 04 2002	
5	2:21:21	Sun Yingjie (CHN)	03 10 1977	2	Beijing	20 10 2002	
6	2:21:22	Yoko Shibui (JPN)	14 03 1979	3	Chicago	13 10 2002	
7	2:21:31	Svetlana Zakharova (RUS)	15 09 1970	4	Chicago	13 10 2002	
8	2:21:49	Naoko Takahashi (JPN)	06 05 1972	1	Berlin	29 09 2002	
9	2:22:19	Gete Wami (ETH)	11 12 1974	1	Amsterdam	20 10 2002	
10	2:22:33	Lyudmila Petrova (RUS)	07 10 1968	3	London	14 04 2002	
11	2:22:46	Reiko Tosa (JPN)	11 06 1976	4	London	14 04 2002	
12	2:23:05	Marleen Renders (BEL)	24 12 1968	1	Paris	07 04 2002	
13	2:23:17	Zhang Shujing (CHN)	13 09 1979	3	Beijing	20 10 2002	
14	2:23:19	Susan Chepkemei (KEN)	25 06 1975	5	London	14 04 2002	
15	2:23:43	Takami Ominami (JPN)	15 11 1975	1	Rotterdam	21 04 2002	
16	2:23:52	Constantina Tomescu (ROM)	23 01 1970	2	Amsterdam	20 10 2002	
17	2:23:55	Lornah Kiplagat (KEN)	20 03 1974	1	Osaka	27 01 2002	
18	2:23:57	Zhu Xiaolin (CHN)	20 04 1984	4	Beijing	20 10 2002	
19	2:24:11	Adriana Fernández (MEX)	04 04 1971	2	Berlin	29 09 2002	
20	2:24:33	Rie Matsuoka (JPN)	09 03 1977	2	Paris	07 04 2002	
21	2:24:34	Harumi Hiroyama (JPN)	02 09 1968	2	Osaka	27 01 2002	
22	2:24:39	Hu Yuanyuan (CHN)		5	Beijing	20 10 2002	
23	2:24:59	Banuelia Mrashani (TAN)	14 11 1977	1	Tokyo	17 11 2002	
24	2:25:11	Masako Chiba (JPN)	18 07 1976	2	Rotterdam	21 04 2002	
25	2:25:15	Sun Weiwei (CHN)	06 04 1985	6	Beijing	20 10 2002	
