= 2001 World Marathon Cup =

World Marathon Cup in Edmonton

The 2001 World Marathon Cup was the ninth edition of the World Marathon Cup of athletics and were held in Edmonton, Canada, inside of the 2001 World Championships.

== Results ==
Team men
#	Nations	Time
1	Ethiopia	6:43:32
2	Japan	6:48:36
3	Italy	6:51:56

Team women
#	Nations	Time
1	Japan	7:22:36
2	Russia	7:26:00
3	Romania	7:29:44

Individual men
#	Athlete	Time
1st place, gold medalist(s)	Gezahegne Abera (ETH)	2:12:42 WL
2nd place, silver medalist(s)	Simon Biwott (KEN)	2:12:43
3rd place, bronze medalist(s)	Stefano Baldini (ITA)	2:13:18
4	Tesfaye Tola (ETH)	2:13:58
5	Shigeru Aburaya (JPN)	2:14:07
6	Abdelkader El Mouaziz (MAR)	2:15:41
7	Tesfaye Jifar (ETH)	2:16:52
8	Yoshiteru Morishita (JPN)	2:17:05
9	Takayuki Nishida (JPN)	2:17:24
10	Simretu Alemayehu (ETH)	2:17:35

Individual women
#	Athlete	Time
1st place, gold medalist(s)	Lidia Șimon (ROM)	2:26:01
2nd place, silver medalist(s)	Reiko Tosa (JPN)	2:26:06
3rd place, bronze medalist(s)	Svetlana Zakharova (RUS)	2:26:18
4	Yoko Shibui (JPN)	2:26:33
5	Sonja Krolik (GER)	2:28:17
6	Florence Barsosio (KEN)	2:28:36
7	Shitaye Gemechu (ETH)	2:28:40
8	Lyubov Morgunova (RUS)	2:28:54
9	Kazumi Matsuo (JPN)	2:29:57
10	Constantina Diță (ROM)	2:30:38

== See also ==
- 2001 World Championships in Athletics – Men's Marathon
- 2001 World Championships in Athletics – Women's Marathon
