= 2002 European Athletics Championships – Men's marathon =

Men's marathon at the European Athletics Championships

The men's marathon at the 2002 European Athletics Championships was held on August 11.

== Results ==
| Rank | Name | Nationality | Time | Notes |
|---|---|---|---|---|
| 1st place, gold medalist(s) | Janne Holmen | Finland | 2:12:14 | |
| 2nd place, silver medalist(s) | Pavel Loskutov | Estonia | 2:13:18 | |
| 3rd place, bronze medalist(s) | Julio Rey | Spain | 2:13:21 | |
| 4 | Daniele Caimmi | Italy | 2:13:30 | |
| 5 | Alberto Juzdado | Spain | 2:13:35 | |
| 6 | Alejandro Gómez | Spain | 2:13:40 | |
| 7 | Kamel Ziani | Spain | 2:13:51 | |
| 8 | Karl Johan Rasmussen | Norway | 2:14:00 | |
| 9 | Francisco Javier Cortes | Spain | 2:14:14 | |
| 10 | Migidio Bourifa | Italy | 2:14:58 | |
| 11 | Xavier Caballero | Spain | 2:15:07 | |
| 12 | Alberico di Cecco | Italy | 2:15:52 | |
| 13 | Danilo Goffi | Italy | 2:15:57 | |
| 14 | Benoît Zwierzchiewski | France | 2:16:00 | |
| 15 | Gino van Geyte | Belgium | 2:16:04 | |
| 16 | Viktor Roethlin | Switzerland | 2:16:16 | |
| 17 | Piotr Gładki | Poland | 2:17:19 | |
| 18 | Asaf Bimro | Israel | 2:17:30 | |
| 19 | Ottavio Andriani | Italy | 2:17:41 | |
| 20 | Vasilios Zabelis | Greece | 2:19:31 | |
| 21 | Sergio Chiesa | Italy | 2:19:43 | |
| 22 | Wodage Zvadya | Israel | 2:20:51 | |
| 23 | José Santos | Portugal | 2:20:55 | |
| 24 | Yrjö Pesonen | Finland | 2:22:58 | |
| 25 | Toni Bernado | Andorra | 2:23:13 | |
| 26 | Torben Nielsen | Denmark | 2:23:36 | |
| 27 | Manuel Pita | Portugal | 2:23:41 | |
| 28 | Margus Pirksaar | Estonia | 2:23:51 | |
| 29 | António Sousa | Portugal | 2:27:09 | |
| 30 | Alcidio Costa | Portugal | 2:27:09 | |
| 31 | Zigmund Zilbershtein | Georgia | 2:30:10 | |
| 32 | Haile Satayin | Israel | 2:30:38 | |
| | Guy Fays | Belgium | DNF | |
| | Sreten Ninković | Yugoslavia | DNF | |

== See also ==
- 2002 Marathon Year Ranking
- 2002 European Marathon Cup
