= 2001 World Championships in Athletics – Men's marathon =

Athletic competition

The Men's Marathon at the 2001 World Championships in Edmonton, Alberta in Canada was held on August 3, 2001.

The winning margin was one second. This was the smallest margin of victory in the marathon at the World Championships until 2025.

== Medalists ==
| Gold | Gezahegne Abera; Ethiopia (ETH) |
| Silver | Simon Biwott; Kenya (KEN) |
| Bronze | Stefano Baldini; Italy (ITA) |

== Abbreviations ==
- All times shown are in hours:minutes:seconds

| DNS | did not start |
| NM | no mark |
| WR | world record |
| AR | area record |
| NR | national record |
| PB | personal best |
| SB | season best |

== Records ==
Standing records prior to the 2001 World Athletics Championships
| World Record | Khalid Khannouchi | United States | 2:05:42 | October 24, 1999 | Chicago, United States |
| Event Record | Robert de Castella | Australia | 2:10:03 | August 14, 1983 | Helsinki, Finland |
| Season Best | Josephat Kiprono | Kenya | 2:06:50 | April 22, 2001 | Rotterdam, Netherlands |

== Intermediates ==
| Rank | Number | Athlete | Country | Time |
5 KILOMETRES
| 1 | 1101 | Ronnie Holassie | Trinidad and Tobago | 15:31 |
| 2 | 1153 | Josh Cox | United States | 15:31 |
| 3 | 1249 | Elijah Mutandiro | Zimbabwe | 15:31 |
| 4 | 572 | Asaf Bimro | Israel | 15:51 |
| 5 | 654 | Takayuki Nishida | Japan | 15:51 |
10 KILOMETRES
| 1 | 1101 | Ronnie Holassie | Trinidad and Tobago | 30:54 |
| 2 | 334 | Simretu Alemayehu | Ethiopia | 31:18 |
| 3 | 598 | Giacomo Leone | Italy | 31:18 |
| 4 | 1179 | Khalid Khannouchi | United States | 31:18 |
| 5 | 696 | Lee Bong-Ju | South Korea | 31:18 |
15 KILOMETRES
| 1 | 1101 | Ronnie Holassie | Trinidad and Tobago | 47:01 |
| 2 | 672 | Simon Biwott | Kenya | 47:32 |
| 3 | 999 | Mathias Ntawulikura | Rwanda | 47:32 |
| 4 | 696 | Lee Bong-Ju | South Korea | 47:32 |
| 5 | 951 | Laban Nkete | South Africa | 47:32 |
20 KILOMETRES
| 1 | 1101 | Ronnie Holassie | Trinidad and Tobago | 1:03:27 |
| 2 | 959 | Ian Syster | South Africa | 1:03:28 |
| 3 | 334 | Simretu Alemayehu | Ethiopia | 1:03:28 |
| 4 | 1179 | Khalid Khannouchi | United States | 1:03:28 |
| 5 | 672 | Simon Biwott | Kenya | 1:03:28 |
HALF MARATHON
| 1 | 334 | Simretu Alemayehu | Ethiopia | 1:06:59 |
| 2 | 959 | Ian Syster | South Africa | 1:06:59 |
| 3 | 761 | Abdelkader El Mouaziz | Morocco | 1:06:59 |
| 4 | 598 | Giacomo Leone | Italy | 1:06:59 |
| 5 | 696 | Lee Bong-Ju | South Korea | 1:06:59 |
25 KILOMETRES
| 1 | 598 | Giacomo Leone | Italy | 1:19:14 |
| 2 | 761 | Abdelkader El Mouaziz | Morocco | 1:19:14 |
| 3 | 654 | Takayuki Nishida | Japan | 1:19:14 |
| 4 | 696 | Lee Bong-Ju | South Korea | 1:19:14 |
| 5 | 959 | Ian Syster | South Africa | 1:19:15 |
30 KILOMETRES
| 1 | 761 | Abdelkader El Mouaziz | Morocco | 1:34:51 |
| 2 | 332 | Gezahegne Abera | Ethiopia | 1:35:00 |
| 3 | 581 | Stefano Baldini | Italy | 1:35:00 |
| 4 | 672 | Simon Biwott | Kenya | 1:35:00 |
| 5 | 630 | Shigeru Aburaya | Japan | 1:35:01 |
35 KILOMETRES
| 1 | 581 | Stefano Baldini | Italy | 1:50:46 |
| 2 | 341 | Tesfaye Tola | Ethiopia | 1:50:46 |
| 3 | 332 | Gezahegne Abera | Ethiopia | 1:50:46 |
| 4 | 672 | Simon Biwott | Kenya | 1:50:47 |
| 5 | 630 | Shigeru Aburaya | Japan | 1:50:48 |
40 KILOMETRES
| 1 | 672 | Simon Biwott | Kenya | 2:06:10 |
| 2 | 332 | Gezahegne Abera | Ethiopia | 2:06:11 |
| 3 | 581 | Stefano Baldini | Italy | 2:06:25 |
| 4 | 341 | Tesfaye Tola | Ethiopia | 2:06:34 |
| 5 | 630 | Shigeru Aburaya | Japan | 2:06:55 |

== Final ranking ==
| Rank | Athlete | Country | Time | Note |
|---|---|---|---|---|
| 1st place, gold medalist(s) | Gezahegne Abera | Ethiopia | 2:12:42 | SB |
| 2nd place, silver medalist(s) | Simon Biwott | Kenya | 2:12:43 | |
| 3rd place, bronze medalist(s) | Stefano Baldini | Italy | 2:13:18 | |
| 4 | Tesfaye Tola | Ethiopia | 2:13:58 | |
| 5 | Shigeru Aburaya | Japan | 2:14:07 | |
| 6 | Abdelkader El Mouaziz | Morocco | 2:15:41 | |
| 7 | Tesfaye Jifar | Ethiopia | 2:16:52 | |
| 8 | Yoshiteru Morishita | Japan | 2:17:05 | |
| 9 | Takayuki Nishida | Japan | 2:17:24 | |
| 10 | Simretu Alemayehu | Ethiopia | 2:17:35 | |
| 11 | Giacomo Leone | Italy | 2:17:54 | |
| 12 | Atsushi Fujita | Japan | 2:18:23 | |
| 13 | Benoît Zwierzchiewski | France | 2:18:29 | |
| 14 | Ian Syster | South Africa | 2:19:38 | |
| 15 | Óscar Fernández | Spain | 2:19:45 | |
| 16 | Abdelhakim Bagy | France | 2:20:43 | |
| 17 | Alberico di Cecco | Italy | 2:20:44 | |
| 18 | Olexandr Kuzin | Ukraine | 2:21:26 | |
| 19 | Benjamín Paredes | Mexico | 2:22:07 | |
| 20 | Asaf Bimro | Israel | 2:22:36 | |
| 21 | Andrés Espinosa | Mexico | 2:23:06 | |
| 22 | Lim Jin-Soo | South Korea | 2:23:16 | |
| 23 | Nicholas Harrison | Australia | 2:23:24 | |
| 24 | Antoni Peña | Spain | 2:23:29 | |
| 25 | Pamenos Ballantyne | Saint Vincent and the Grenadines | 2:24:36 | |
| 26 | Kenichi Takahashi | Japan | 2:24:41 | |
| 27 | Franklin Tenorio | Ecuador | 2:25:15 | |
| 28 | Luketz Swartbooi | Namibia | 2:25:40 | |
| 29 | Kamal Ziani | Spain | 2:25:43 | |
| 30 | Thabiso Moqhali | Lesotho | 2:25:44 | |
| 31 | Mykola Rudyk | Ukraine | 2:26:04 | |
| 32 | Diego Colorado | Colombia | 2:26:13 | |
| 33 | Ahmed Adam Saleh | Qatar | 2:26:32 | |
| 34 | Larbi Zeroual | France | 2:26:45 | |
| 35 | Josh Cox | United States | 2:26:52 | |
| 36 | Rod de Highden | Australia | 2:27:42 | |
| 37 | Julio Rey | Spain | 2:27:59 | |
| 38 | Eddy Hellebuyck | United States | 2:28:01 | |
| 39 | Anders Szalkai | Sweden | 2:28:33 | |
| 40 | Magnus Michelsson | Australia | 2:28:36 | |
| 41 | Francisco Javier Cortés | Spain | 2:28:48 | |
| 42 | Steve Bohan | Canada | 2:29:22 | |
| 43 | Ernest Ndjissipou | Central African Republic | 2:29:25 | |
| 44 | Tesfit Berhe | Eritrea | 2:29:50 | |
| 45 | Francisco Bautista | Mexico | 2:29:56 | |
| 46 | Bruce Deacon | Canada | 2:30:22 | |
| 47 | Vasiliy Medvedev | Uzbekistan | 2:30:28 | |
| 48 | Michael Dudley | United States | 2:30:45 | |
| 49 | Vasilios Zabelis | Greece | 2:31:34 | |
| 50 | Andriy Naumov | Ukraine | 2:31:42 | |
| 51 | António Zeferino | Cape Verde | 2:32:46 | |
| 52 | Kim Gillard | Australia | 2:33:11 | |
| 53 | Rafael Yax | Guatemala | 2:33:21 | |
| 54 | Kim Yi-Yong | South Korea | 2:33:28 | |
| 55 | Isaac García | Mexico | 2:33:32 | |
| 56 | Alfredo Arevalo | Guatemala | 2:34:16 | |
| 57 | Gregorio Domínguez | Mexico | 2:35:15 | |
| 58 | Jean-Paul Niyonsaba | Burundi | 2:35:43 | |
| 59 | Ðuro Kodžo | Bosnia and Herzegovina | 2:35:47 | PB |
| 60 | Zigmund Zilbershtein | Georgia | 2:36:01 | |
| 61 | Kopamo Pekile | Lesotho | 2:36:24 | |
| 62 | Juan Eulogio Ramos | Guatemala | 2:37:15 | |
| 63 | Honest Mutsakani | Zimbabwe | 2:37:44 | |
| 64 | Oliver Utting | Canada | 2:39:53 | |
| 65 | Nestor Jami | Ecuador | 2:41:18 | |
| 66 | Abdellah Béhar | France | 2:41:42 | |
| 67 | Laban Nkete | South Africa | 2:42:21 | |
| 68 | Sergey Zabavski | Tajikistan | 2:42:22 | |
| 69 | José Jami | Ecuador | 2:42:23 | |
| 70 | Leonardo Vieira Guedes | Brazil | 2:43:11 | |
| 71 | Christian Marmen | Canada | 2:44:44 | |
| 72 | Fraser Bertram | Canada | 2:45:10 | |
| — | Roberto Barbi | Italy | DQ | |
| — | Andreas Erm | Germany | DNF | |
| — | Abukar Mohamed | Somalia | DNF | |
| — | Gert Thys | South Africa | DNF | |
| — | Josiah Bembe | South Africa | DNF | |
| — | Abdelfattah Aïtzouri | Morocco | DNF | |
| — | Lee Bong-Ju | South Korea | DNF | |
| — | Josephat Kiprono | Kenya | DNF | |
| — | Samson Kandie | Kenya | DNF | |
| — | Theodoros Zachos | Greece | DNF | |
| — | Ahmed Saeed Hassan | Somalia | DNF | |
| — | Elijah Mutandiro | Zimbabwe | DNF | |
| — | Elson Williams | Guyana | DNF | |
| — | Arkadi Tolstyh | Kyrgyzstan | DNF | |
| — | Mathias Ntawulikura | Rwanda | DNF | |
| — | Stephen Bwire Mlingi | Tanzania | DNF | |
| — | Luis Novo | Portugal | DNF | |
| — | Roman Kejžar | Slovenia | DNF | |
| — | Ronnie Holassie | Trinidad and Tobago | DNF | |
| — | Azzedine Sakhri | Algeria | DNF | |
| — | Fekadu Degefu | Ethiopia | DNF | |
| — | Mohamed Ezzher | France | DNF | |
| — | Giovanni Ruggiero | Italy | DNF | |
| — | David Morris | United States | DNF | |
| — | Khalid Khannouchi | United States | DNF | |
| — | Josiah Thugwane | South Africa | DNS | |
| — | Mustapha Riad | Morocco | DNS | |
| — | Percy Sephoda | Lesotho | DNS | |
| — | Pedro Ventura Jiménez | Honduras | DNS | |
| — | Emiliano Lemus | Honduras | DNS | |
| — | Daher Gadid Omar | Djibouti | DNS | |
| — | Ntoka Kapinga | DR Congo | DNS | |

== See also ==
- 2000 Summer Olympics (Sydney)
- 2001 Marathon Year Ranking
- 2001 World Marathon Cup
