= 1997 World Championships in Athletics – Men's marathon =

The men's marathon at the 1997 World Championships in Athletics was held in Athens, Greece, on Sunday August 10, 1997.

== Medalists ==
Gold	Abel Antón; Spain
Silver	Martín Fiz; Spain
Bronze	Steve Moneghetti; Australia

== Records ==
Standing records prior to the 1997 World Athletics Championships
World record	Belayneh Densamo	Ethiopia	2:06:50	April 17, 1988	Rotterdam, Netherlands
Championships record	Robert de Castella	Australia	2:10:03	August 14, 1983	Helsinki, Finland
Season best	Domingos Castro	Portugal	2:07:51	April 20, 1997	Rotterdam, Netherlands

== Final ranking ==
Rank	Athlete	Country	Time	Note
1st place, gold medalist(s)	Abel Antón	Spain	2:13:16	
2nd place, silver medalist(s)	Martín Fiz	Spain	2:13:21	
3rd place, bronze medalist(s)	Steve Moneghetti	Australia	2:14:16	
4	Danilo Goffi	Italy	2:14:47	
5	Luíz Antônio dos Santos	Brazil	2:15:31	
6	Fabián Roncero	Spain	2:16:53	
7	Giacomo Leone	Italy	2:17:16	
8	Azzedine Sakhri	Algeria	2:17:44	
9	Eduard Tukhbatullin	Russia	2:17:44	
10	António Rodrigues	Portugal	2:17:54	
11	Philippe Rémond	France	2:18:19	
12	Xolile Yawa	South Africa	2:18:37	
13	Dave Scudamore	United States	2:18:41	
14	Willy Kalombo Mwenze	DR Congo	2:19:18	
15	José Manuel García	Spain	2:19:31	
16	Bruce Deacon	Canada	2:20:29	
17	Dave Buzza	Great Britain & N.I.	2:20:34	
18	José Luis Molina	Costa Rica	2:20:55	
19	Nikolaos Polias	Greece	2:21:03	
20	Mostafa El Damaoui	Morocco	2:21:05	
21	Ahmed Hussein	Ethiopia	2:21:08	
22	Akira Manai	Japan	2:21:23	
23	Vanderlei de Lima	Brazil	2:21:48	
24	Daher Gadid Omar	Djibouti	2:21:57	
25	Shinji Kawashima	Japan	2:22:33	
26	Baek Seung-Do	South Korea	2:22:40	
27	Sean Quilty	Australia	2:23:10	
28	João Lopes	Portugal	2:23:15	
29	Jean Pierre Monciaux	France	2:23:19	
30	Francesco Ingargiola	Italy	2:23:30	
31	Stéphane Franke	Germany	2:23:53	
32	Karel David	Czech Republic	2:24:42	
33	Adam Motlagale	South Africa	2:24:49	
34	Katsuhiko Hanada	Japan	2:25:00	
35	Max Wenisch	Austria	2:25:12	
36	Osmiro Silva	Brazil	2:25:37	
37	António Zeferino	Cape Verde	2:25:56	
38	Dominique Chauvelier	France	2:26:06	
39	Abner Chipu	South Africa	2:26:06	
40	Takahiro Hattori	Japan	2:26:33	
41	Valdenor dos Santos	Brazil	2:27:12	
42	Girma Daba	Ethiopia	2:27:30	
43	Sérgio Jimenez	Mexico	2:27:30	
44	Pascal Zilliox	France	2:27:50	
45	Knut Hegvold	Norway	2:27:54	
46	Klaus Peter Hansen	Denmark	2:28:29	
47	Terje Naess	Norway	2:29:04	
48	Pavel Loskutov	Estonia	2:29:10	
49	Jean-Paul Gahimbaré	Burundi	2:30:56	
50	Luis Martínez	Guatemala	2:31:11	
51	Hsu Gi-sheng	Chinese Taipei	2:31:31	
52	Woliye Jara	Ethiopia	2:31:44	
53	Raymond Boyd	Australia	2:32:07	
54	Sid-Ali Sakhri	Algeria	2:34:26	
55	Molatlhegi Segobaetso	Botswana	2:34:47	
56	Dan Held	United States	2:35:19	
57	Éder Fialho	Brazil	2:36:14	
58	Koji Shimizu	Japan	2:37:11	
59	Asaf Bimro	Israel	2:37:45	
60	Mpakeletsa Sephali	Lesotho	2:38:37	
61	Isaac Simelane	Swaziland	2:40:32	
62	Marco Ochoa	United States	2:44:21	
63	Jon Warren	United States	2:45:56	
64	Marcos Juarez	Guatemala	2:55:14	
65	Emilio Velasquez	Guatemala	2:56:07	
66	Sergey Zabavski	Tajikistan	3:02:49	
67	Alain Nkulu	DR Congo	3:08:32	
68	Zebedayo Bayo	Tanzania	3:11:19	
69	Roderic De Highden	Australia	3:13:44	
70	Errol Peters	Guyana	3:14:30	
—	Sophuong Vanh	Cambodia	DNF	
—	Patrick Ntambwe Ngoie	DR Congo	DNF	
—	Tumo Turbo	Ethiopia	DNF	
—	Dale Rixon	Great Britain & N.I.	DNF	
—	George Karagiannis	Greece	DNF	
—	Ioannis Perifanos	Greece	DNF	
—	Marcello Curioni	Italy	DNF	
—	Cosmas Ndeti	Kenya	DNF	
—	Mbarak Hussein	Kenya	DNF	
—	Trpe Martinovski	Macedonia	DNF	
—	Vitor Vasco	Portugal	DNF	
—	Abel Mokibe	South Africa	DNF	
—	Francis Naali	Tanzania	DNF	
—	Petro Meta	Tanzania	DNF	
—	Rubén Maza	Venezuela	DNF	
—	Luketz Swartbooi	Namibia	DNF	
—	Paulo Catarino	Portugal	DNF	
—	Chang Ki-Shik	South Korea	DNF	
—	Salah Qoqaiche	Morocco	DNF	
—	Alberto Juzdado	Spain	DNF	
—	António Pinto	Portugal	DNF	
—	Andrés Espinosa	Mexico	DNF	
—	Faustino Reynoso	Mexico	DNF	
—	Lawrence Peu	South Africa	DNF	
—	Abdelkader El Mouaziz	Morocco	DNF	
—	Moges Taye	Ethiopia	DNF	
—	Isidro Rico	Mexico	DNF	
—	Don Janicki	United States	DNF	
—	Diego García	Spain	DNF	
—	Bruno Leger	France	DNF	
—	Joseph Tjitunga	Namibia	DNF	
—	Benjamín Paredes	Mexico	DNF	
—	Vincenzo Modica	Italy	DNF	
—	Abdillahi Bouh	Djibouti	DNF	
—	William Koech	Kenya	DNF	
—	Panagiotis Charamis	Greece	DNF	
—	Yayeh Aden	Djibouti	DNF	
—	Spyros Andriopoulos	Greece	DNF	
—	Sonam Tobgay	Bhutan	DNS	
—	Marco Condori	Bolivia	DNS	
—	Darren Wilson	Australia	DNS	

== See also ==
- Men's Olympic Marathon (1996)
- 1997 World Marathon Cup
