= 2003 World Marathon Cup =

World Marathon Cup in Paris

The 2003 World Marathon Cup was the tenth edition of the World Marathon Cup of athletics and were held in Paris, France, inside of the 2003 World Championships.

== Results ==
Team men
#	Nations	Time
1	Japan	6:30:43
2	Italy	6:32:19
3	South Africa	6:35:54

Team women
#	Nations	Time
1	Japan	7:14:48
2	Ethiopia	7:24:56
3	Russia	7:31:04

Individual men
#	Athlete	Time
1st place, gold medalist(s)	Jaouad Gharib (MAR)	2:08:31 CR
2nd place, silver medalist(s)	Julio Rey (ESP)	2:08:38
3rd place, bronze medalist(s)	Stefano Baldini (ITA)	2:09:14
4	Alberto Chaíça (POR)	2:09:25 PB
5	Shigeru Aburaya (JPN)	2:09:26 SB
6	Daniele Caimmi (ITA)	2:09:29 SB
7	Ian Syster (RSA)	2:10:17
8	Michael Kosgei Rotich (KEN)	2:10:35
9	Hendrick Ramaala (RSA)	2:10:37
10	Atsushi Sato (JPN)	2:10:38

Individual women
#	Athlete	Time
1st place, gold medalist(s)	Catherine Ndereba (KEN)	2:23:55
2nd place, silver medalist(s)	Mizuki Noguchi (JPN)	2:24:14
3rd place, bronze medalist(s)	Masako Chiba (JPN)	2:25:09
4	Naoko Sakamoto (JPN)	2:25:25
5	Ham Bong-Sil (PRK)	2:25:31 NR
6	Elfenesh Alemu (ETH)	2:26:29
7	Joyce Chepchumba (KEN)	2:26:33 SB
8	Olivera Jevtić (SCG)	2:26:49
9	Svetlana Zakharova (RUS)	2:26:53
10	Shitaye Gemechu (ETH)	2:27:26 SB

== See also ==
- 2003 World Championships in Athletics – Men's Marathon
- 2003 World Championships in Athletics – Women's Marathon
