= 2006 London Marathon =

Marathon race

26th London Marathon
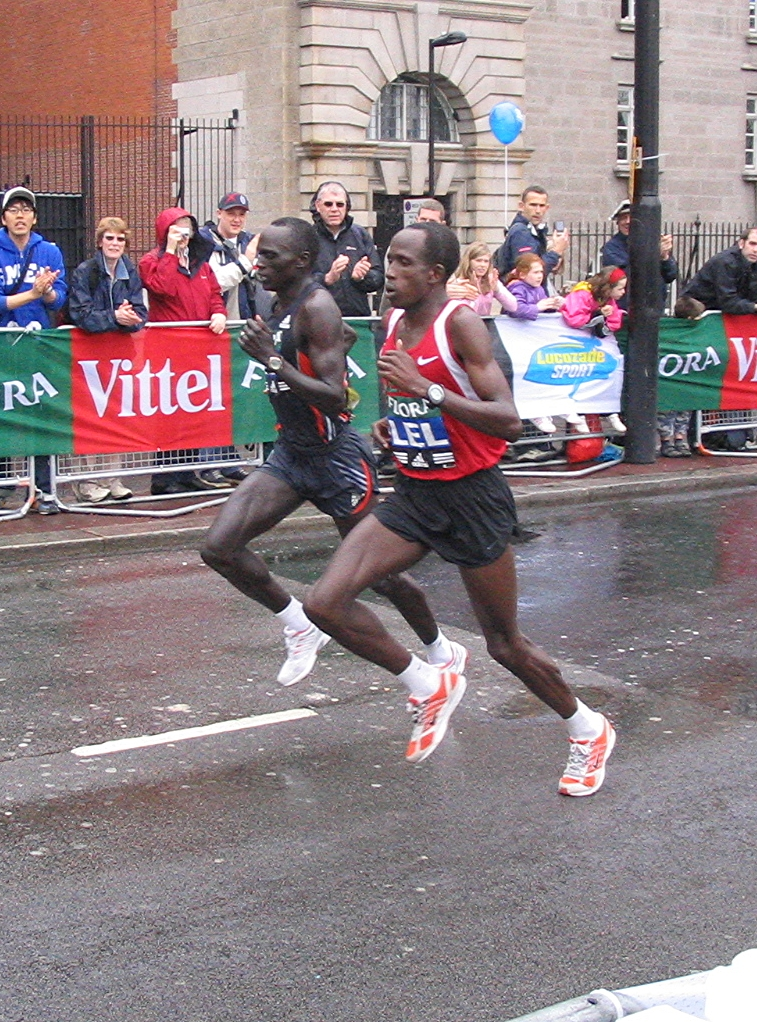
- Leaders during the men's race
- Venue: London, United Kingdom
- Date: 23 April 2006

Champions
- Men: Felix Limo (2:06:39)
- Women: Deena Kastor (2:19:36)
- Wheelchair men: David Weir (1:29:48)
- Wheelchair women: Francesca Porcellato (1:59:57)

The 2006 London Marathon was the 26th running of the annual marathon race in London, United Kingdom, which took place on Sunday, 23 April. The elite men's race was won by Kenya's Felix Limo in a time of 2:06:39 hours and the women's race was won by Deena Kastor of the United States in 2:19:36.

In the wheelchair races, Britain's David Weir (1:29:48) and Italy's Francesca Porcellato (1:59:57) won the men's and women's divisions, respectively. Weir was the first person to complete the course in under one and a half hours.

Around 119,000 people applied to enter the race: 47,020 had their applications accepted and 33,578 started the race. A total of 32,924 runners, 22849 men and 10,075 women, finished the race.

== Results ==
=== Men ===
Position	Athlete	Nationality	Time
1st place, gold medalist(s)	Felix Limo	Kenya	2:06:39
2nd place, silver medalist(s)	Martin Lel	Kenya	2:06:41
3rd place, bronze medalist(s)	Hendrick Ramaala	South Africa	2:06:55
4	Khalid Khannouchi	United States	2:07:04
5	Stefano Baldini	Italy	2:07:22
6	Rodgers Rop	Kenya	2:07:34
7	Hicham Chatt	Morocco	2:07:59
8	Jaouad Gharib	Morocco	2:08:45
9	Haile Gebrselassie	Ethiopia	2:09:05
10	Evans Rutto	Kenya	2:09:35
11	Abdelkader El Mouaziz	Morocco	2:10:24
12	Peter Riley	United Kingdom	2:14:31
13	Shigeru Aburaya	Japan	2:14:49
14	Kamal Ziani	Spain	2:14:50
15	Huw Lobb	United Kingdom	2:15:38
16	Tomas Abyu	Ethiopia	2:15:50
17	Francisco Javier Cortés	Spain	2:15:51
18	Trond Idland	Norway	2:16:09
19	Henrik Sandstad	Norway	2:16:48
20	Phillip Sly	Australia	2:16:53
—	Abiyote Guta	Ethiopia	DNF
—	Paul Kimaiyo	Kenya	DNF
—	Daniel Rono	Kenya	DNF
—	Fabiano Joseph Naasi	Tanzania	DNF
—	Solomon Busendich	Kenya	DNF
—	Elias Kiptum Maindi	Kenya	DNF
—	Dominic Bannister	United Kingdom	DNF
—	Benjamin Noad	United Kingdom	DNF
—	Anders Szalkai	Sweden	DNF
—	Mark Carroll	Ireland	DNF
—	Kassa Tadesse	United Kingdom	DNF
—	Christopher Isengwe	Tanzania	DNF

=== Women ===
Position	Athlete	Nationality	Time
1st place, gold medalist(s)	Deena Kastor	United States	2:19:36
2nd place, silver medalist(s)	Lyudmila Petrova	Russia	2:21:29
3rd place, bronze medalist(s)	Susan Chepkemei	Kenya	2:21:46
4	Birhane Adere	Ethiopia	2:21:52
5	Galina Bogomolova	Russia	2:21:58
6	Mara Yamauchi	United Kingdom	2:25:13
7	Constantina Dita	Romania	2:27:51
8	Salina Kosgei	Kenya	2:28:40
9	Margaret Okayo	Kenya	2:29:16
10	Eri Hayakawa	Japan	2:31:41
11	Clague Jenny	United Kingdom	2:36:10
12	Stine Larsen	Norway	2:37:31
13	Alice Braham	United Kingdom	2:40:38
14	Holly May	United Kingdom	2:44:59
15	Gill Laithwaite	United Kingdom	2:45:24
16	Adela Salt	United Kingdom	2:47:41
17	Imogene Thornburgh	United Kingdom	2:48:43
18	Birhan Dagne	United Kingdom	2:49:48
19	Maxine McKinnon	United Kingdom	2:50:27
20	Barbara Yff Hosack	Netherlands	2:50:36
—	Lisa Blommé	Sweden	DNF
—	Lucy MacAlister	United Kingdom	DNF
—	Helena Olofsson	Sweden	DNF

=== Wheelchair men ===
Position	Athlete	Nationality	Time
1st place, gold medalist(s)	David Weir	United Kingdom	1:29:48 CR
2nd place, silver medalist(s)	Saúl Mendoza	Mexico	1:37:52
3rd place, bronze medalist(s)	Alain Fuss	France	1:39:37
4	Éric Teurnier	France	1:43:52
5	Brian Alldis	United Kingdom	1:47:34
6	Jeff Adams	Canada	1:53:24
7	Jason Richards	United Kingdom	1:53:29
8	Shaho Qadir	United Kingdom	2:00:52
9	Jason Gill	United Kingdom	2:02:47
10	Steve Williamson	United Kingdom	2:03:23

=== Wheelchair women ===
Position	Athlete	Nationality	Time
1st place, gold medalist(s)	Francesca Porcellato	Italy	1:59:57
2nd place, silver medalist(s)	Shelly Woods	United Kingdom	2:04:37
3rd place, bronze medalist(s)	Deborah Brennan	United Kingdom	2:21:02
4	Sarah Piercy	United Kingdom	2:39:10
