= 1998 Berlin Marathon =

Road running event in Berlin, Germany

25th Berlin Marathon
- Venue: Berlin, Germany
- Dates: 20 September 1998

Champions
- Men: Ronaldo da Costa (2:06:05)
- Women: Marleen Renders (2:25:22)

The 1998 Berlin Marathon was the 25th running of the annual marathon race held in Berlin, Germany, held on 20 September 1998. Brazil's Ronaldo da Costa won the men's race in 2:06:05 hours, while the women's race was won by Belgian Marleen Renders in 2:25:22. Costa, running only for the second time over the distance, lowered the men's marathon world record by 45 seconds and performed a cartwheel in celebration at the finish line.

== Results ==
=== Men ===
Position	Athlete	Nationality	Time
1	Ronaldo da Costa	Brazil	2:06:05 WR
2	Josephat Kiprono	Kenya	2:07:27
3	Samson Kandie	Kenya	2:09:11
4	Reuben Chebutich	Kenya	2:10:39
5	Tumo Turbo	Ethiopia	2:11:01
6	Paulo Guerra	Portugal	2:11:02
7	Diego García	Spain	2:11:04
8	Abebe Mekonnen	Ethiopia	2:12:13
9	Andries Khulu	South Africa	2:12:36
10	Martin Strege	Germany	2:12:41

=== Women ===
Position	Athlete	Nationality	Time
1	Marleen Renders	Belgium	2:25:22
2	Susan Chepkemei	Kenya	2:28:19
3	Renata Kokowska	Poland	2:31:54
4	Iris Biba	Germany	2:32:58
5	Yoshiko Ichikawa	Japan	2:33:29
6	Krystyna Kuta	Poland	2:35:48
7	Anke Laws	Germany	2:36:08
8	Ryoko Kitajima	Japan	2:36:55
9	Jennifer Akerberg	Sweden	2:38:38
10	Paivi Kauppinen	Finland	2:41:21
