= Gezahegne =

Gezahegne is both a given name and a surname. Notable people with the name include:

- Kalkidan Gezahegne (born 1991), Ethiopian-born Bahraini middle distance runner
- Gezahegne Abera (born 1978), Ethiopian long-distance runner
