= 1999 Berlin Marathon =

Road running event in Berlin, Germany

26th Berlin Marathon
- Venue: Berlin, Germany
- Dates: 26 September 1999

Champions
- Men: Josephat Kiprono (2:06:44)
- Women: Tegla Loroupe (2:26:15)

The 1999 Berlin Marathon was the 26th running of the annual marathon race held in Berlin, Germany, held on 26 September 1999. Kenya's Josephat Kiprono won the men's race in 2:06:44 hours, while the women's race was won by his compatriot Tegla Loroupe in 2:20:43, which lowered her own marathon world record by four seconds.

== Results ==
=== Men ===
Position	Athlete	Nationality	Time
1	Josephat Kiprono	Kenya	2:06:44
2	Takayuki Inubushi	Japan	2:06:57
3	Samson Kandie	Kenya	2:08:31
4	Hicham Chatt	Morocco	2:09:56
5	Henry Kipkosgei	Kenya	2:10:37
6	Waldemar Glinka	Poland	2:11:53
7	Eduardo do Nascimento	Brazil	2:12:12
8	Stephen Ndungu	Kenya	2:12:23
9	Daisuke Tokunaga	Japan	2:13:09
10	Jose Telles	Brazil	2:13:25

=== Women ===
Position	Athlete	Nationality	Time
1	Tegla Loroupe	Kenya	2:20:43 WR
2	Marleen Renders	Belgium	2:23:58
3	Svetlana Zakharova	Russia	2:27:08
4	Małgorzata Sobańska	Poland	2:27:30
5	Aniela Nikiel	Poland	2:29:27
6	Shiki Sekiuchi	Japan	2:30:42
7	Serap Aktaş	Turkey	2:31:43
8	Daria Nauer	Switzerland	2:32:38
9	Milkah Chepkieny	Kenya	2:32:46
10	Simona Viola	Italy	2:33:33
