= Alberico Di Cecco =

Italian long-distance runner

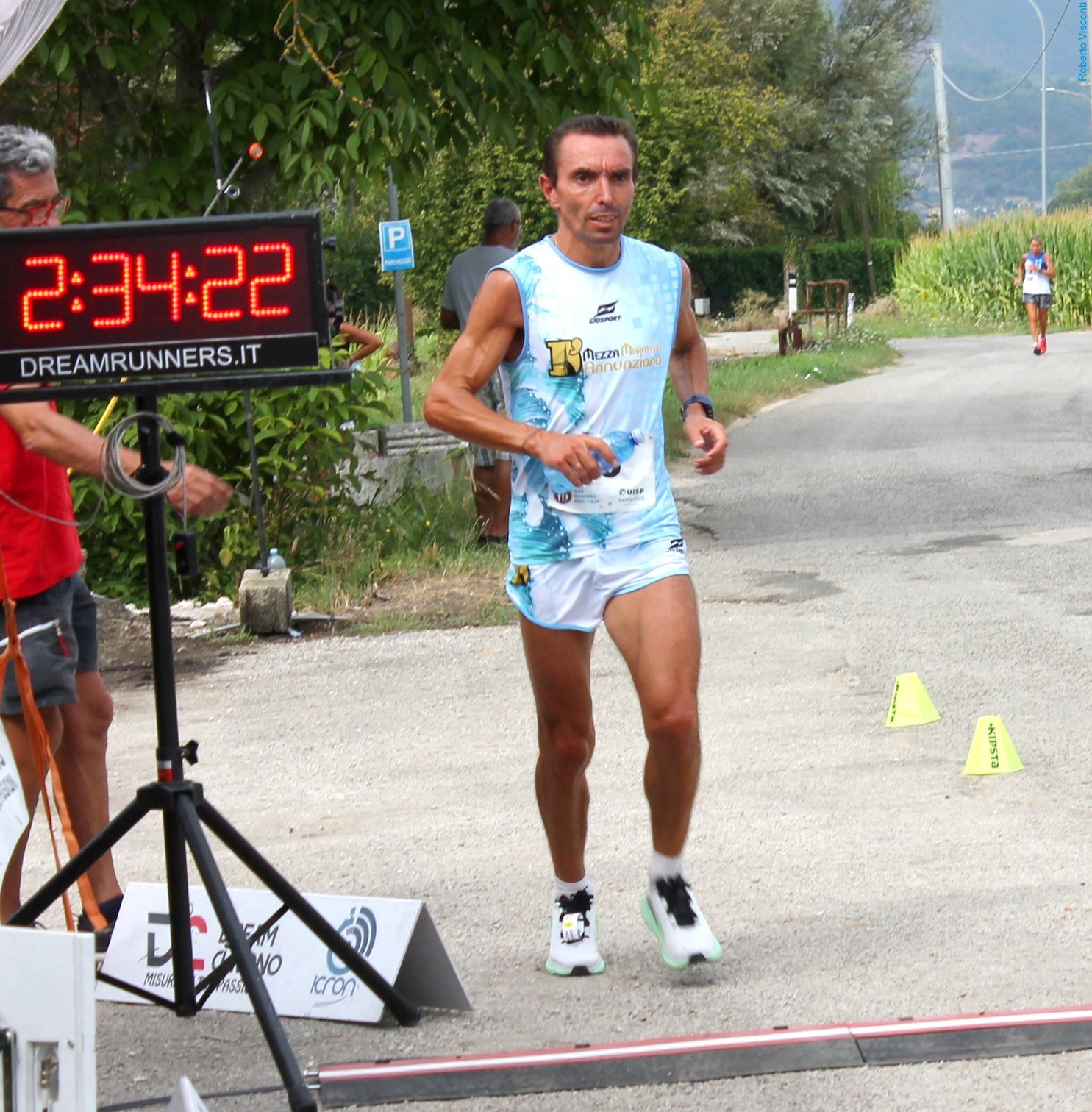
- Cecco in 2020

Personal information
- Born: 19 April 1974 (age 52) Guardiagrele, Italy

Sport
- Country: Italy
- Sport: Athletics
- Event: Marathon

Achievements and titles
- Personal best: Marathon: 2:08:02 (2005)
Medal record
World Marathon Cup
Silver medal – second place	2003 Paris	Team marathon
Bronze medal – third place	2001 Edmonton	Team marathon
European Marathon Cup
Silver medal – second place	2002 Munich	Team marathon

Alberico Di Cecco (born 19 April 1974) is an Italian long-distance runner who specialises in the marathon race.

== Biography ==
He was banned from the sport for two years by the Italian National Olympic Committee (CONI) after testing positive for EPO at the Italian Championship on 12 October 2008.

== Achievements ==
- All results regarding marathon, unless stated otherwise

Year	Competition	Venue	Position	Notes
2001	World Championships	Edmonton, Canada	17th	2:20:44
2002	European Championships	Munich, Germany	12th	2:15:52
2003	World Championships	Paris, France	22nd	2:13:36
2004	Olympic Games	Athens, Greece	9th	2:14:34
2005	Rome City Marathon	Rome, Italy	1st	2:08:02 (PB)

== Personal bests ==
- 5000 metres - 14:06
- 10000 metres - 28:48.51 min (2000)
- Half marathon - 1:01:55 hrs (2002)
- Marathon - 2:08:02 hrs (2005)

== See also ==
- Italian all-time top lists - Marathon
