= Marcello Curioni =

Italian marathon runner

Personal information
- Nationality: Italian
- Born: 28 May 1965 (age 61)

Sport
- Country: Italy
- Sport: Athletics
- Event: Marathon

Achievements and titles
- Personal best: Marathon: 2:13:37 (1997)

Marcello Curioni (born 28 May 1965) is an Italian male retired marathon runner, which participated at the 1997 World Championships in Athletics.

== Achievements ==
| Year | Competition | Venue | Position | Event | Time | Notes |
|---|---|---|---|---|---|---|
| 1997 | World Championships | (Greece) Athens | DNF | Marathon | NM | |
