= 2002 European Marathon Cup =

2002 Marathon competition held in Munich, Germany

The 2002 European Marathon Cup was the seventh edition of the European Marathon Cup of athletics and were held in Munich, Germany, inside of the 2002 European Championships.

== Results ==
Team men
#	Nations	Time
1	Spain	8:54:27
2	Italy	9:00:17
3	Portugal	9:38:54

Team women
#	Nations	Time
1	Germany	10:17:20
2	Russia	10:55:22

Individual men
Rank	Name	Nationality	Time	Notes
1st place, gold medalist(s)	Janne Holmen	Finland	2:12:14	
2nd place, silver medalist(s)	Pavel Loskutov	Estonia	2:13:18	
3rd place, bronze medalist(s)	Julio Rey	Spain	2:13:21	
4	Danielle Caimmi	Italy	2:13:30	
5	Alberto Juzdado	Spain	2:13:35	
6	Alejandro Gómez	Spain	2:13:40	
7	Kamel Ziani	Spain	2:13:51	
8	Karl Johan Rasmussen	Norway	2:14:00	
9	Francisco Javier Cortes	Spain	2:14:14	
10	Migidio Bourifa	Italy	2:14:58	

Individual women
Rank	Athlete	Time	Note
1st place, gold medalist(s)	Maria Guida (ITA)	2:26:05	CR
2nd place, silver medalist(s)	Luminita Zaituc (GER)	2:26:58	
3rd place, bronze medalist(s)	Sonja Oberem (GER)	2:28:45	
4	Jane Salumäe (EST)	2:33:46	
5	Rosaria Console (ITA)	2:35:23	
6	Nadezhda Wijenberg (NED)	2:36:06	
7	Marie Söderström-Lundberg (SWE)	2:36:13	
8	Ulrike Maisch (GER)	2:36:41	
9	Annemette Jensen (DEN)	2:37:27	
10	Judit Földing-Nagy (HUN)	2:37:33	

== See also ==
- 2002 European Athletics Championships – Men's Marathon
- 2002 European Athletics Championships – Women's Marathon
