= 2000 World Mountain Running Trophy =

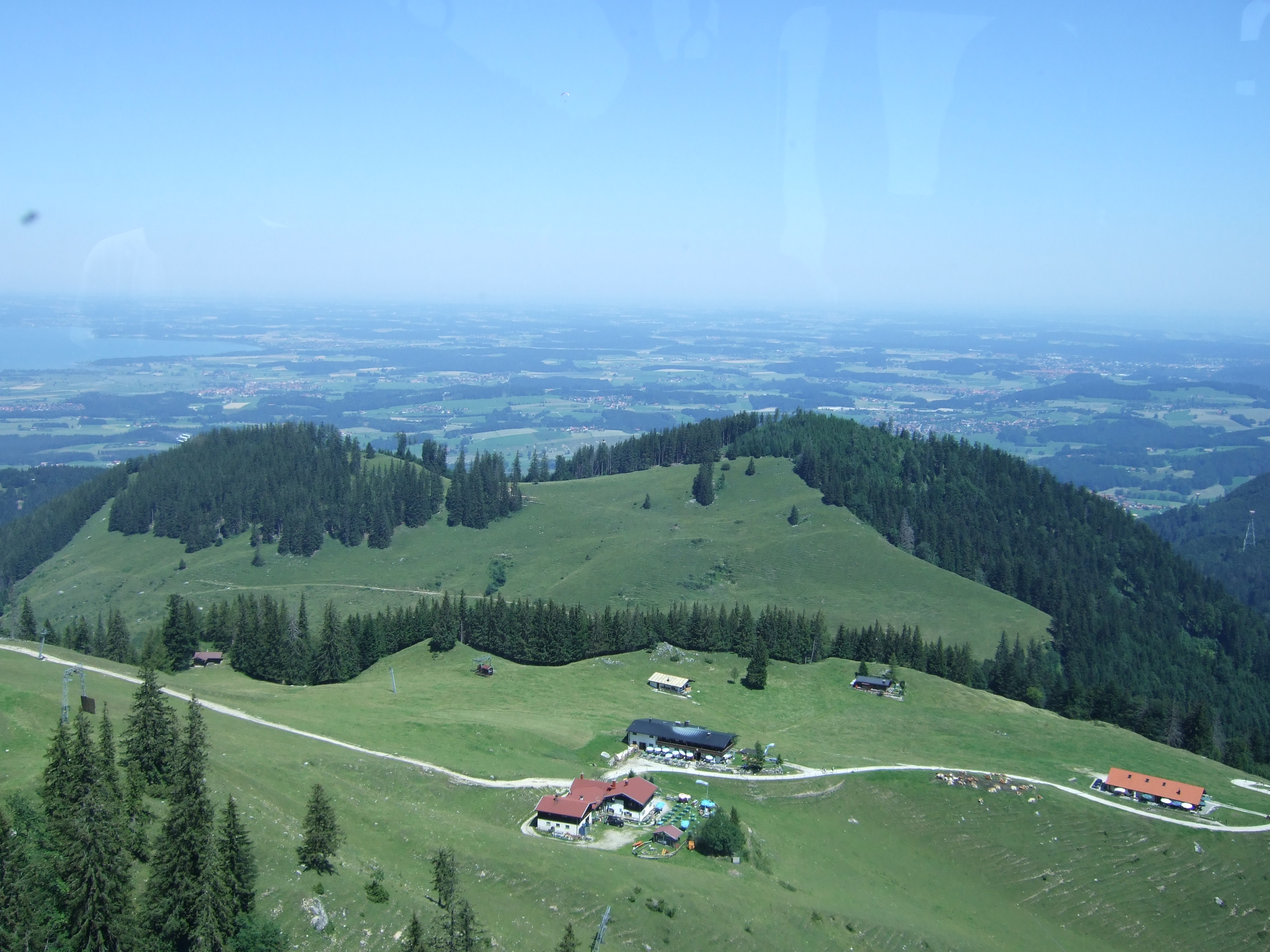
- Hochfelln landscape
- Organisers: WMRA
- Edition: 16th
- Dates: 10 September
- Host city: Bergen, Upper Bavaria, Germany
- Level: Senior and Junior
- Events: 8

The 2000 World Mountain Running Championships was the 16th edition of the global mountain running competition, World Mountain Running Championships, organised by the World Mountain Running Association.

== Men Senior ==
Distance 11.6 km, difference in height 1204 m, participants 131.

Individual

Rank	Runner	Country	Time
1st place, gold medalist(s)	Jonathan Wyatt	New Zealand	47:29
2nd place, silver medalist(s)	Hans Kogler	Austria	49:48
3rd place, bronze medalist(s)	Alexis Gex-Fabry	Switzerland	50:16
4	Thomas Gregor	Germany	50:31
5	Sergio Chiesa	Italy	50:39
6	Raymond Fontaine	France	50:47
7	Billy Burns	England	50:50
8	Martin Cox	England	50:59
9	Helmut Schmuck	Austria	51:18
10	Massimo Galliano	Italy	51:25

Team

Rank	Team	Athletes	Points
1st place, gold medalist(s)	Italy	Sergio Chiesa, Massimo Galliano, Antonio Molinari, Roberti Calandro, Marco De Gasperi, Davide Milesi	46
2nd place, silver medalist(s)	Austria	Hans Kogler, Helmut Schmuck, Alexander Rieder, Rudolf Reitberger, Franz Engl, Gerald Habison	53
3rd place, bronze medalist(s)	New Zealand	Jonathan Wyatt, Aaron Strong, Simon Maunder, Callum Harland, Michael Wakelin, Reon Rollo	76

== Women Senior ==
Participants 75.

Individual

Rank	Runner	Country	Time
1st place, gold medalist(s)	Angela Mudge	Scotland	49:24
2nd place, silver medalist(s)	Birgit Sonntag	Germany	49:43
3rd place, bronze medalist(s)	Izabela Zatorska	Poland	50:11
4	Melissa Moon	New Zealand	50:52
5	Matilde Ravizza	Italy	51:22
6	Alessandra Olarte	Colombia	51:32
7	Anna Pichrtova	Czech Republic	51:37
8	Megan Edhouse	New Zealand	51:49
9	Elisabeth Rust	Austria	51:54
10	Pierangela Baronchelli	Italy	51:58

Team

Rank	Team	Athletes	Points
1st place, gold medalist(s)	New Zealand	Melissa Moon, Megan Edhouse, Karen Murphy, Carline Mc Donald	25
2nd place, silver medalist(s)	Italy	Matilde Ravizza, Pierangela Baronchelli, Flavia Gaviglio, Rosita Rota Gelpi	27
3rd place, bronze medalist(s)	Germany	Birgit Sonntag, Gudrun De Pay, Stefanie Buss, Ellen Schoener	28

== Junior Men ==
Participants 70.

Individual

Rank	Runner	Country	Time
1st place, gold medalist(s)	Nebai Habtegiorgis	Eritrea	44:08
2nd place, silver medalist(s)	Florian Heinzle	Austria	44:48
3rd place, bronze medalist(s)	Tomasz Klisz	Poland	46:31
4	Alessandro Tonazzini	Italy	46:45
5	Matteo Massi	Italy	47:10
6	Johnny Cattaneo	Italy	47:26
7	Rastislav Galovic	Slovakia	47:44
8	Gaim Berhane	Eritrea	47:59
9	Michael Cosentino	France	48:04
10	Julius Helm	Germany	48:10

Team

Rank	Team	Athletes	Points
1st place, gold medalist(s)	Italy	Alessandro Tonazzini, Matteo Massi, Johnny Cattaneo, Marco Aimo Bot	15
2nd place, silver medalist(s)	Eritrea	Nebai Habtegiorgis, Gaim Berhane, Tecle Menghistab, Habtai Kiflesion	41
3rd place, bronze medalist(s)	Czech Republic	Petr Hudek, Roman Gaudel, Petr Pechek, Libor Erben	49

== Junior Women ==
Participants 38.

Individual

Rank	Runner	Country	Time
1st place, gold medalist(s)	Elise Marcot	France	29:05
2nd place, silver medalist(s)	Chris Tye	New Zealand	29:20
3rd place, bronze medalist(s)	Lea Vetsch	Switzerland	29:20
4	Adele Montonati	Italy	29:45
5	Agnieszka Stafa	Poland	30:40
6	Susanne Recknagel	Germany	30:44
7	Kate Bailey	England	31:23
8	Elisa Desco	Italy	31:30
9	Pavla Havlova	Czech Republic	31:31
10	Lara De Faveri	Italy	31:37

Team

Rank	Team	Athletes	Points
1st place, gold medalist(s)	Italy	Adele Montonati, Elisa Desco, Lara De Faveri	12
2nd place, silver medalist(s)	France	Elise Marcot, Aurelie Tizon	15
3rd place, bronze medalist(s)	Germany	Susanne Recknagel, Lisa Reisinger, Katharina Walther	17

== Medal table (junior events included) ==
Rank	Country	1st place, gold medalist(s)	2nd place, silver medalist(s)	3rd place, bronze medalist(s)	Tot.
1	Italy	3	1	0	4
2	New Zealand	2	1	1	4
3	Eritrea	1	1	0	2
3	France	1	1	0	2
5	Scotland	1	0	0	1
6	Austria	0	3	0	3
7	Germany	0	1	2	3
8	Poland	0	0	2	2
8	Switzerland	0	0	2	2
10	Czech Republic	0	0	1	1
