= Óscar Fernández (athlete) =

Spanish long-distance runner

Óscar Fernández Giralda (born October 23, 1974) is a retired male long-distance runner from Spain. He set his personal best (2:09:59) in the marathon on December 12, 2003 in Fukuoka, Japan.

He is currently a coach of a group of athletes belonging to the Isaac Viciosa athletics school. He also runs his own school of athletics in Tudela de Duero (Valladolid), called Santinos.

== Achievements ==
Year	Competition	Venue	Position	Event	Notes
Representing Spain
2000	World Half Marathon Championships	Veracruz, Mexico	8th	Half marathon	
2001	Rotterdam Marathon	Rotterdam, Netherlands	8th	Marathon	2:10:33
2001	World Championships	Edmonton, Canada	15th	Marathon	2:19:45
2003	Rotterdam Marathon	Rotterdam, Netherlands	13th	Marathon	2:13:23
