= Fabián Roncero =

Spanish long-distance runner

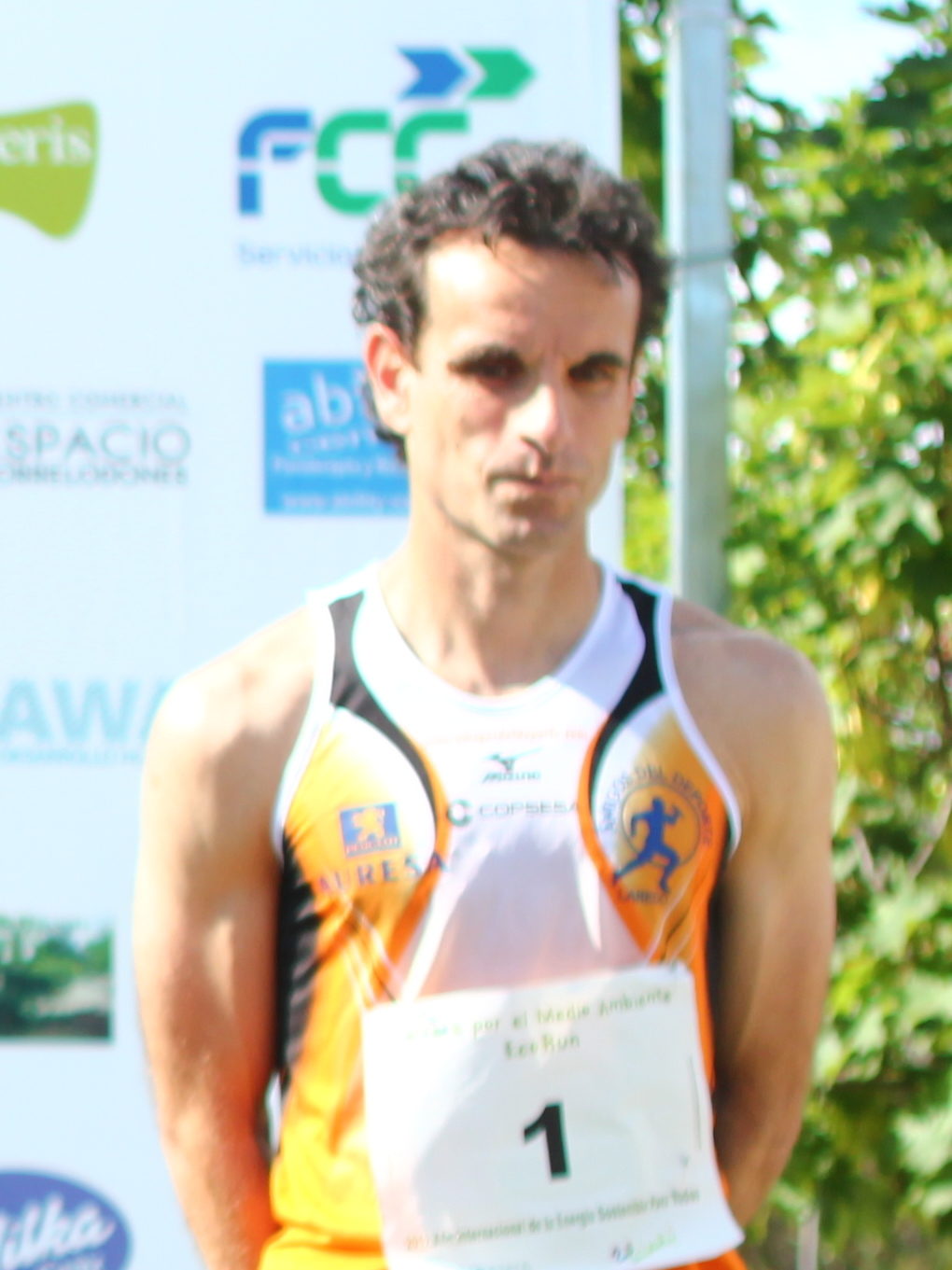
- Roncero in 2012

Personal information
- Full name: Fabián Roncero Domínguez
- Born: 19 October 1970 (age 55) Madrid, Spain

Sport
- Country: Spain
- Sport: Long-distance running
- Events: 10000 metres; Half marathon; Marathon

Fabián Roncero Domínguez (born 19 October 1970) is a Spanish former long-distance runner. He ran in track, cross country and road running competitions. His personal best of 59:52 minutes for the half marathon, set in 2001, lasted as a European record for fourteen years. It remains the Spanish record for the distance. He also holds national records in the 10,000 metres (27:14.44 minutes), and for the 15 km, 20 km and 30 km intermediates on the road.

He represented his country three times consecutively at the World Championships in Athletics, coming sixth in the marathon in 1997, failing to finish the 1999 marathon, and then finally coming fifth in the 10,000 metres in 2001. He was 22nd at the 1995 IAAF World Half Marathon Championships.

On grass, he was a four-time participant at the IAAF World Cross Country Championships, his best outing being tenth in the long race in 1998. He won a bronze medal at the 2002 European Cross Country Championships, leading the Spanish men to the team title as well. He was also a team bronze medallist at the 1998 edition and a team silver medallist at the 2003 race (where he was sixth individually).

On the road circuit he won the 1996 Italian Marathon in a time of 2:09:43 and the 1998 Rotterdam Marathon in a lifetime best of 2:07:26 hours. He returned to Rotterdam in 2001, but his time of 2:10:08 was only enough for seventh on that occasion. As of 2014, he remains the most recent European man to win the Rotterdam Marathon.

== International competitions ==
Year	Competition	Venue	Position	Event	Notes
Representing Spain
1997	World Championships	Athens, Greece	6th	Marathon	2:16:53
1999	World Championships	Seville, Spain	—	Marathon	DNF

== Personal bests ==
Event	Time (h:m:s)	Date	Place
3000 m	7:41.48	25 July 2010	Barcelona, Spain
5000 m	13:22.46	18 August 2001	San Sebastián, Spain
10,000 m	27:14.44 NR	4 April 1998	Lisbon, Portugal
Half marathon	59:52 NR	1 April 2001	Berlin, Germany
Marathon	2:07:23	18 April 1999	Rotterdam, Netherlands

Sporting positions
Preceded by Kenichi Takahashi	Men's Half Marathon Best Year Performance; 2001	Succeeded by Haile Gebrselassie
