= Oleksandr Kuzin =

Ukrainian long-distance runner

Oleksandr Leonidovych Kuzin (Ukrainian: Олександр Леонідович Кузін; born October 21, 1974) is a male long-distance runner from Ukraine who mainly competed in the marathon race. He set his personal best (2:07:33) in the classic distance on April 15, 2007 in Linz, Austria.

== Achievements ==
Year	Competition	Venue	Position	Event	Notes
Representing Ukraine
2001	World Championships	Edmonton, Canada	18th	Marathon	2:21:26
2008	Olympic Games	Beijing, PR China	—	Marathon	DNF
