= Andrés Espinosa =

Mexican long-distance runner

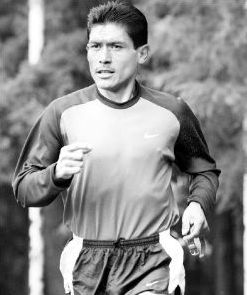
Espinosa in action

Andrés Espinoza Pérez (born 4 February 1963) is a Mexican former long-distance runner who specialized in marathon races.

Espinosa finished ninth at the 1995 World Championships in 2:16:44 hours. He won the 1993 New York Marathon and achieved his personal best time of 2:07:19 hours at the 1994 Boston Marathon. He set the world master (+40) record for the marathon in Berlin Marathon 2003 (2:08:46), which lasted nearly a dozen years until it was broken by 2 seconds in 2015 by Evergreen Kenneth Mungara. He also won the Lisbon Half Marathon in 1994.

== Achievements ==
Year	Competition	Venue	Position	Event	Notes
Representing Mexico
1988	Dallas Marathon	Dallas, United States	1st	Marathon	2:16:13
1989	Dallas Marathon	Dallas, United States	1st	Marathon	2:16:19
1991	New York City Marathon	New York, United States	2nd	Marathon	2:10:00
1992	New York City Marathon	New York, United States	2nd	Marathon	2:10:44
1993	New York City Marathon	New York, United States	1st	Marathon	2:10:04
1994	Boston Marathon	Boston, United States	2nd	Marathon	2:07:19
1994	Lisbon Half Marathon	Lisbon, Portugal	1st	Half marathon	1:01.34
1995	World Championships	Gothenburg, Sweden	9th	Marathon	2:16:44
1997	World Championships	Athens, Greece	—	Marathon	DNF
1997	Amsterdam Marathon	Amsterdam, Netherlands	3rd	Marathon	2:10:22
1999	Boston Marathon	Boston, United States	17th	Marathon	2:18:47
2000	Olympic Games	Sydney, Australia	27th	Marathon	2:18:02
2001	Torreon Marathon	Torreon, Mexico	1st	Marathon	2:10:57
2001	World Championships	Edmonton, Canada	21st	Marathon	2:23:06
2003	Boston Marathon	Boston, United States	23rd	Marathon	2:19:54
2003	Berlin Marathon	Berlin, Germany	4th	Marathon	2:08:46
2004	Olympic Games	Athens, Greece	69th	Marathon	2:29:43
