= Samson Kandie =

Kenyan long-distance runner (1971–2024)

Personal information
- National team: Kenya
- Born: 20 April 1971
- Died: 4 October 2024 (aged 53) Eldoret, Uasin Gishu County

Sport
- Sport: Athletics
- Event: Marathon

Achievements and titles
- Personal best: 2:08:31 – 1991 Berlin Marathon

Samson Kandie (20 April 1971 – 4 October 2024) was a Kenyan long-distance runner, who won the 2004 edition of the Vienna Marathon, breaking the course record. He set his personal best (2:08:31) in the classic distance on 26 September 1999, at the Berlin Marathon, where he finished third. Kandie also came third in the Berlin marathon in 1998.

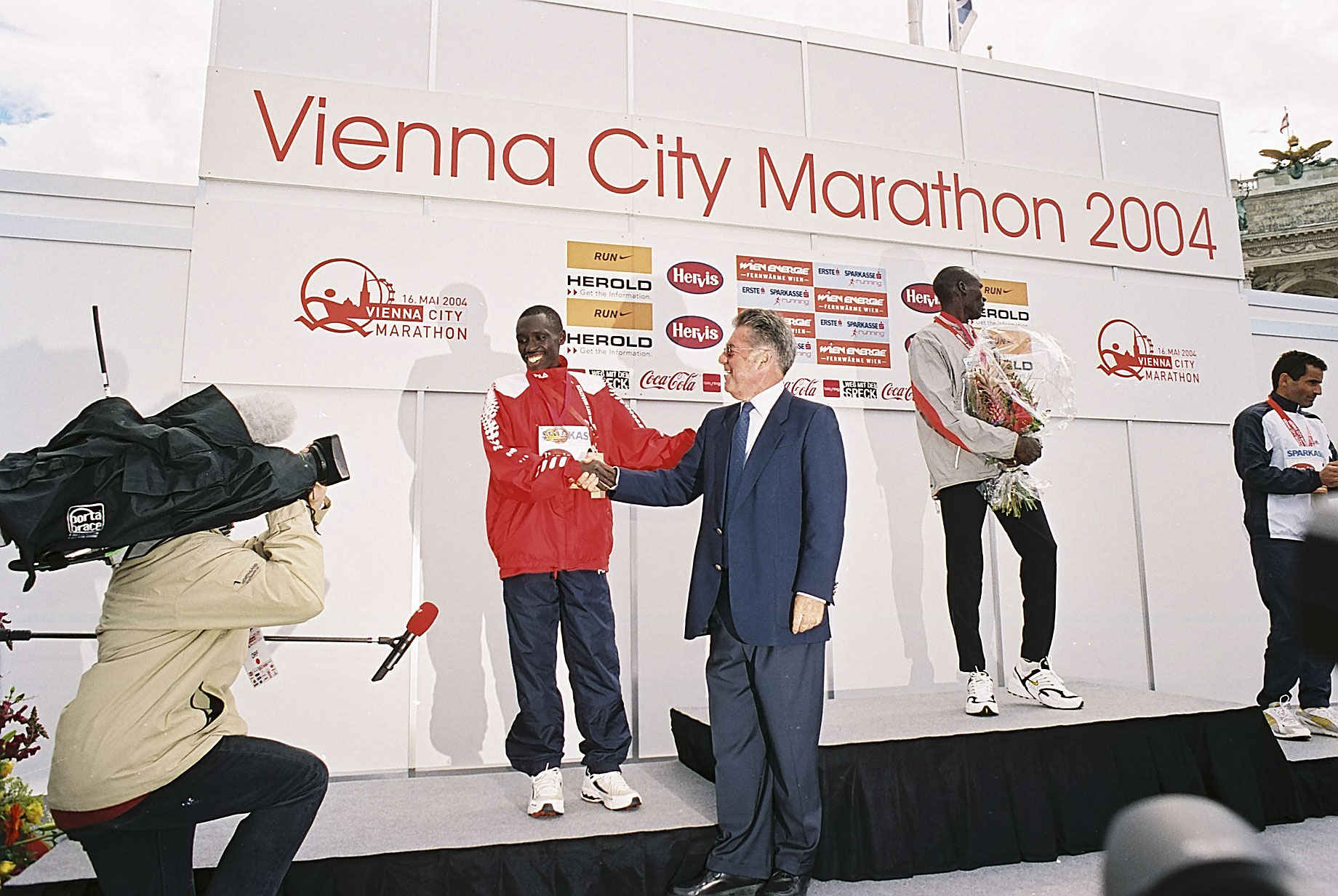
Samson Kandie (2nd from right) at the medal ceremony of the Vienna City Marathon 2004

He also took part in the marathon race at the 2001 World Championships, but did not finish the race.

Kandie died on 4 October 2024 after being attacked and beaten at his home. He was 53.

== Achievements ==
Year	Competition	Venue	Position	Event	Notes
Representing Kenya
1998	Berlin Marathon	Berlin, Germany	3rd	Marathon	2:09:11
1999	Berlin Marathon	Berlin, Germany	3rd	Marathon	2:08:31
2001	World Championships	Edmonton, Canada	—	Marathon	DNF
2002	Hokkaido Marathon	Sapporo, Japan	1st	Marathon	2:15:12
2004	Vienna Marathon	Vienna, Austria	1st	Marathon	2:08:35

== See also ==
- Benjamin Kiplagat, Kenyan-born, Ugandan long-distance runner also killed by unknown assailants in Eldoret.
