= Benjamin Kimutai =

Kenyan long-distance runner

Benjamin Kimutai Koskei (born September 5, 1971) is a male long-distance runner from Kenya. He has born in Keiyo district of Kenya. He won the 2002 edition of the Amsterdam Marathon, clocking 2:07:26.

== Achievements ==
Year	Competition	Venue	Position	Event	Notes
Representing Kenya
2002	Amsterdam Marathon	Amsterdam, Netherlands	1st	Marathon	2:07:26
2003	Boston Marathon	Boston, United States	2nd	Marathon	2:10:34
2003	Amsterdam Marathon	Amsterdam, Netherlands	3rd	Marathon	2:07:39
2005	Boston Marathon	Boston, United States	12th	Marathon	2:18:22
