= Tudela de Duero =

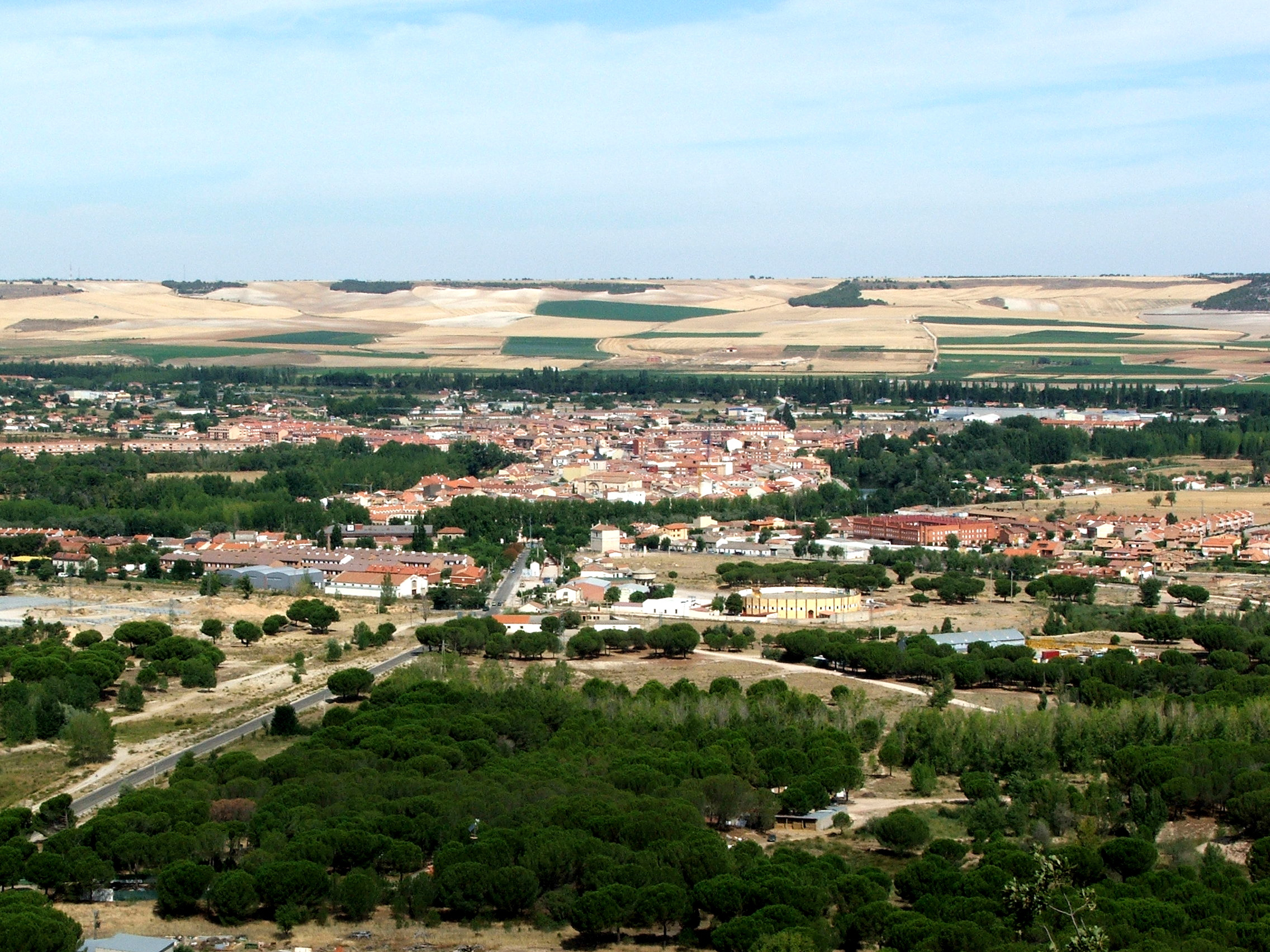
- View of Tudela de Duero.

- Coat of arms

- Location within Castile and León Location within Spain
- Coordinates: 41°35′03″N 4°34′48″W
- Country: Spain
- Autonomous community: Castile and León
- Province: Valladolid
- Municipality: Tudela de Duero

Area
  - Total: 60 km^{2} (23 sq mi)

Population (2025-01-01)
  - Total: 8,861
  - Density: 150/km^{2} (380/sq mi)
- Time zone: UTC+1 (CET)
  - Summer (DST): UTC+2 (CEST)

Tudela de Duero is a municipality located in the province of Valladolid, Castile and León, Spain. According to the 2015 census (INE), the municipality has a population of 8,683 inhabitants. The municipality is located 15 km (approx. 9 miles) away from the south-east of Valladolid around a meander of the Duero river, at 700 m (approx. 2300 feet) above sea level. It has a neighborhood known as Herrera de Duero, located 6 km (approx. 3.7 miles) away from the main municipality.

Tudela de Duero is popularly known as "the joyful tear of the Duero river" or as "Castille's oasis" due to its abundant vegetation. Its neighboring municipalities are, to the north, Renedo de Esgueva and Villabáñez; to the south, Aldeamayor de San Martín and La Parrilla, to the east, Traspinedo; and to the west, La Cistérniga.

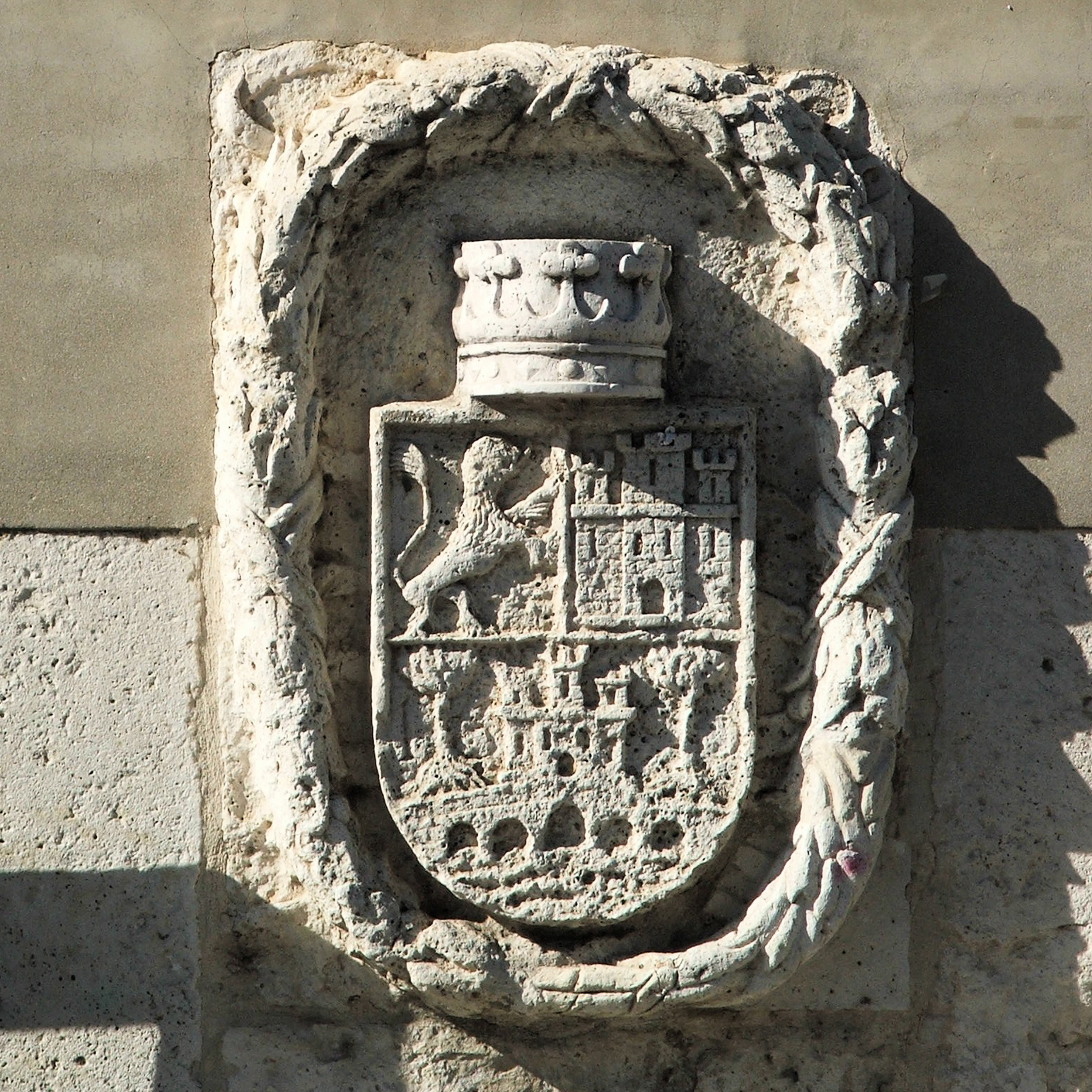
Coat of arms

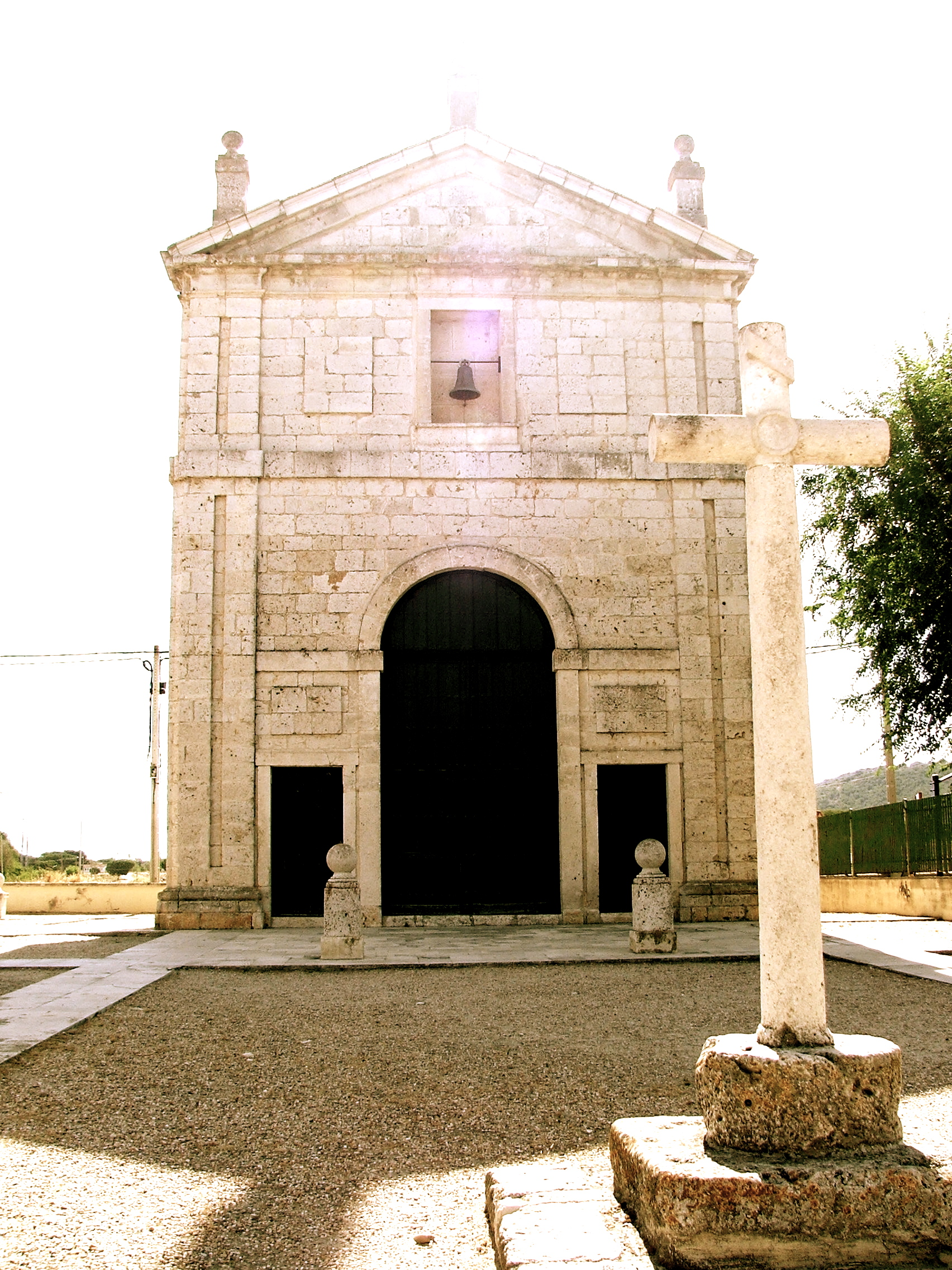
Hermitage of the Humilladero de la Quinta Angustia

== See also ==
- Cuisine of the province of Valladolid
