= Benjamín Paredes =

Mexican long-distance runner

Personal information
- Born: August 7, 1961 (age 64) Ecatepec de Morelos, Mexico

Sport
- Sport: Track and field
Medal record
Representing Mexico
Pan American Games
Gold medal – first place	1995 Mar del Plata	Marathon
Central American and Caribbean Games
Gold medal – first place	1993 Ponce	Marathon

Benjamín Vencar Paredes Martínez (born August 7, 1961) is a Mexican former long-distance runner who specialized in the marathon, but who also competed in duathlons, even winning a silver medal for Mexico at the ITU-world championships in Frankfurt am Main, Germany, in June 1992.

== Achievements ==
Year	Competition	Venue	Position	Event	Notes
Representing Mexico
1993	Central American and Caribbean Games	Ponce, Puerto Rico	1st	Marathon	2:14:23
1994	New York City Marathon	New York City, United States	2nd	Marathon	2:11:23
1995	Pan American Games	Mar del Plata, Argentina	1st	Marathon	2:14:44
1996	Olympic Games	Atlanta, United States	8th	Marathon	2:14:55
1997	World Championships	Athens, Greece	—	Marathon	DNF
2000	Olympic Games	Sydney, Australia	64th	Marathon	2:27:17
2001	World Championships	Edmonton, Canada	19th	Marathon	2:22:07

=== Personal bests ===
- 10,000 metres - 28:43 minutes (2003) Montreal, Canada
- Half marathon - 1:01:49 hours (1999) Half Marathon - World Championships. Oslo, Norway
- Marathon - 2:10:41 hours (1994) Rotterdam, The Netherlands
