= Tumo Turbo =

Ethiopian long-distance runner

Tumo Turbo (February 23, 1970 in Sidama province – October 29, 2008) was an Ethiopian long-distance runner, who won the inaugural Prague Marathon in 1995 in 2:12:44 and the Eindhoven Marathon in 1996, clocking a time of 2:11:26. Only 3 weeks later afgter winning the Eindhoven Marathon, he came in second place in the 1996 New York Marathon in 2:10:09, finishing 15 seconds behind champion Giacomo Leone.

Turbo represented his native country in the men's marathon at the 1996 Summer Olympics, alongside Abebe Mekonnen and Belayneh Dinsamo, but did not finish the race. He held the course record of 2:14:56 in the 1992 Tel Aviv Marathon until 2014.

At just 38 years of age, he died on October 29, 2008, in a fatal bus accident which occurred on the Addis Ababa-Awassa road and killed another 18 people.

== Achievements ==
Year	Competition	Venue	Position	Event	Notes
Representing Ethiopia
1995	Prague Marathon	Prague, Czech Republic	1st	Marathon	2:12:44
1995	World Championships	Gothenburg, Sweden	29th	Marathon	2:22:01
1996	Houston Marathon	Houston, United States	1st	Marathon	2:10:34
1996	Olympic Games	Atlanta, United States	—	Marathon	DNF
1996	Eindhoven Marathon	Eindhoven, Netherlands	1st	Marathon	2:11:26
1996	New York Marathon	New York City, United States	2nd	Marathon	2:10:09
1997	World Championships	Athens, Greece	—	Marathon	DNF
