= Benoît Zwierzchiewski =

French long-distance runner

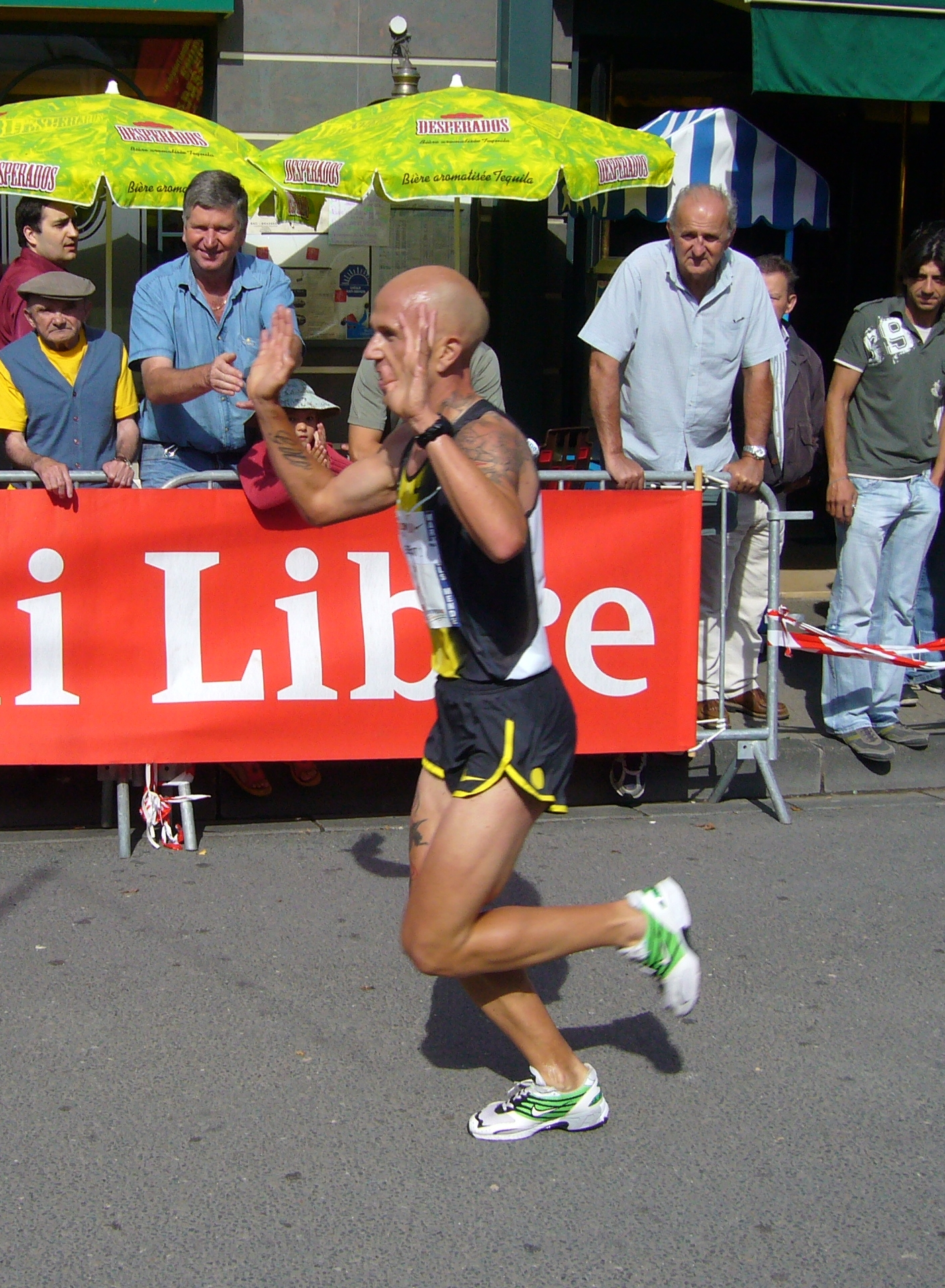
Benoît Zwierzchiewski in 2007

Benoît Zwierzchiewski (born August 19, 1976, in Mouscron, Belgium) is a male long-distance runner from France who mainly competed in the marathon race during his career. He set his personal best (2:06:36) in the classic distance on April 6, 2003, in Paris, France, equalling the European record set by Portugal's António Pinto at the 2000 edition of the London Marathon. Zwierzchiewski set the course record at the Las Vegas Half marathon on February 9, 1997 besting the hour mark, recording a world class 59:53 which was then ten seconds from Moses Tanui's world's best time.

== Achievements ==
Year	Competition	Venue	Position	Event	Notes
Representing France
1994	World Junior Championships	Lisbon, Portugal	7th	5000m	14:04.34
2000	Reims Marathon	Reims, France	1st	Marathon	2:10:47
2001	World Championships	Edmonton, Canada	13th	Marathon	2:18:29
2002	Paris Marathon	Paris, France	1st	Marathon	2:08:18
2002	European Championships	Munich, Germany	14th	Marathon	2:16.00
2003	Paris Marathon	Paris, France	2nd	Marathon	2:06.36
2003	World Championships	Paris, France	—	Marathon	DNS
2006	European Championships	Gothenburg, Sweden	—	Marathon	DNF
