= Abdelhakim Bagy =

French long-distance runner

Abdelhakim Bagy (born 31 March 1968 in Hichaoua, Morocco) is a retired male long-distance runner from France who mainly competed in the marathon race during his career. He set his personal best (2:11:06) in the classic distance on 8 April 2001 at the Paris Marathon.

== Achievements ==
Year	Competition	Venue	Position	Event	Notes
Representing France
1998	European Championships	Budapest, Hungary	11th	Marathon	2:14:48
2001	Paris Marathon	Paris, France	7th	Marathon	2:11:06
2001	World Championships	Edmonton, Canada	16th	Marathon	2:20:43
2003	World Championships	Paris, France	34th	Marathon	2:16:06
2005	World Championships	Helsinki, Finland	36th	Marathon	2:21:49
2006	European Championships	Göteborg, Sweden	14th	Marathon	2:15.54
