= Daniele Caimmi =

Italian long-distance runner

Personal information
- Born: 17 December 1972 (age 53) Jesi, Italy
- Height: 1.80 m (5 ft 11 in)
- Weight: 60 kg (132 lb)

Sport
- Country: Italy
- Sport: Athletics
- Event: Marathon
- Club: G.S. Fiamme Gialle

Achievements and titles
- Personal bests: 10000 m: 27:48.64 (2000); Marathon: 2:08:59 (2002)
Medal record
World Marathon Cup
Gold medal – first place	1999 Seville	Team marathon
Silver medal – second place	2001 Edmonton	Team marathon
European Marathon Cup
Silver medal – second place	2002 Munich	Team marathon
Event	1st	2nd	3rd
Venice Marathon	0	0	1
Milan Marathon	0	0	1

Daniele Caimmi (born 17 December 1972, in Jesi) is an Italian long-distance runner who specializes in the marathon race. His personal best marathon time is 2:08:59 hours, achieved in December 2002 in Milan.

== Biography ==
He finished tenth at the 1999 World Championships, fourth at the 2002 European Championships and sixth at the 2003 World Championships.

== Achievements ==
Year	Competition	Venue	Position	Event	Notes
1999	World Championships	Seville, Spain	10th	Marathon	2:16:23
2000	World Half Marathon Championships	Veracruz, Mexico	36th	Half marathon	
2000	World Half Marathon Championships	Veracruz, Mexico	5th	Team	
2001	Venice Marathon	Venice, Italy	3rd	Marathon	2:10:26
2002	Milan Marathon	Milan, Italy	3rd	Marathon	2:08:59
2003	World Championships	Paris, France	6th	Marathon	2:09:29
2004	Olympic Games	Athens, Greece	52nd	Marathon	2:23:07

== National titles ==
Daniele Caimmi has won 2 times the individual national championship.

- 1 win in 10000 metres (2000)
- 1 win in Half marathon (1999)

== See also ==
- Italian all-time lists - Marathon
