= Yoshiteru Morishita =

Japanese long-distance runner

Yoshiteru Morishita (森下 由輝, Morishita Yoshiteru; born May 26, 1971) is a retired male long-distance runner from Japan who mainly competed in the marathon race during his career. He set his personal best (2:07:59) in the classic distance on March 4, 2001, in Otsu.

== Achievements ==
- All results regarding marathon, unless stated otherwise

Year	Competition	Venue	Position	Notes
Representing Japan
2001	Lake Biwa Marathon	Ōtsu, Japan	4th	2:07:59
2001	World Championships	Edmonton, Canada	8th	2:17:05
