= Ian Syster =

South African long-distance runner

Ian Syster (20 January 1976 – 25 December 2004) was a South African long-distance runner who specialized in the marathon.

He was born in Prince Albert. He finished fourteenth at the 2001 World Championships and seventh at the 2003 World Championships. He also competed at the 2004 Olympic Games, but did not finish the race. At city marathons, Syster finished fifth in the 2002 London Marathon, and won the Beijing Marathon the following year.

He had a personal best of 13:45.37 minutes in the 5000 metres, achieved in March 2002 in Bellville, and 28:24.61 minutes in the 10,000 metres, achieved in March 2002 in Port Elizabeth. In the longer races he had 1:02:44 hours in the half marathon and 2:07:06 hours in the marathon, both achieved in April 2002 in the London Marathon. Ian Syster and his two-month-old son drowned in December 2004 in Keimoes following a car accident.

== Achievements ==
Year	Competition	Venue	Position	Event	Notes
Representing South Africa
2001	World Championships	Edmonton, Canada	14th	Marathon	2:19:38
2002	London Marathon	London, United Kingdom	5th	Marathon	2:07:06
2003	Beijing Marathon	Beijing, PR China	1st	Marathon	2:07:49
2003	World Championships	Paris, France	7th	Marathon	2:10:17
2004	Olympic Games	Athens, Greece	—	Marathon	DNF
