= Rod de Highden =

Australian long-distance runner

Rod de Highden (born 15 January 1969) is an Australian distance runner. In 1994, he finished 152nd in the World Cross Country. He finished 23rd at the 1996 Atlanta Olympics and 28th at the 2000 Sydney Olympics. Highden also won the 1995, 2000 and 2002 Australian Marathons.

Since his retirement, de Highden has begun a teaching career at Swinburne University, where he is Sport and Recreation Coordinator.

He has a daughter named Soraya Jane, who is a runner and dancer.
