= Shinji Kawashima =

Japanese long-distance runner

Personal information
- Nationality: Japanese
- Born: 4 June 1966 (age 60) Tokyo, Japan

Sport
- Sport: Long-distance running
- Event: Marathon

Shinji Kawashima (川嶋 伸次, Kawashima Shinji; born 4 June 1966) is a Japanese long-distance runner. He competed in the men's marathon at the 2000 Summer Olympics.
