= Vasilios Zabelis =

Greek long-distance runner

Vasilios Zambelis (Greek: Βασίλειος Ζαμπέλης, born May 7, 1973) is a Greek long-distance runner. He was the 2002 Greek Champion in the Athens Classic Marathon with a time of 2:20:38. Zabelis holds the second best marathon time for a Greek athlete, finishing in 2.13.24 in the 2002 Rotterdam Marathon.
