= Moges Taye =

Ethiopian long-distance runner

Moges Taye (born December 12, 1973, in Showa) is a long-distance runner from Ethiopia. His breakthrough performance came at the Rome City Marathon in 1996, which he won in a time of 2:12:03. He represented Ethiopia in the marathon at the 1997 World Championships in Athletics, but failed to finish the race.

At the 1997 Istanbul Marathon he won in a course record time of 2:13:37 – a time which went unbettered for almost a decade. Further to this, Taye would go on to defend his title for the next two years becoming the only man to have won the race on three occasions. In 1998 he won the Tiberias Marathon in a course record time of 2:12:51, beating Kevin Shaw's previous mark by more than a minute. Later that year he won the 1998 edition of the Vienna Marathon. He won the Venice Marathon in 2001. Making his second international road appearance, he ran at the 2003 World Championships in Athletics in the marathon but failed to finish the race. He won the 2004 edition of the Nagano Marathon in Japan.

== Achievements ==
Year	Competition	Venue	Position	Event	Notes
Representing Ethiopia
1996	Rome City Marathon	Rome, Italy	1st	Marathon	2:12:03
1997	World Championships	Athens, Greece	—	Marathon	DNF
1998	Vienna Marathon	Vienna, Austria	1st	Marathon	2:10:08
2000	Rome City Marathon	Rome, Italy	4th	Marathon	2:09:49
2001	Venice Marathon	Venice, Italy	1st	Marathon	2:11:59
2003	World Championships	Paris, France	—	Marathon	DNF
2004	Nagano Marathon	Nagano, Japan	1st	Marathon	2:13:09
