= Simretu Alemayehu =

Ethiopian long-distance runner

Medal record

Men's athletics

Representing Ethiopia

African Championships
Bronze medal – third place	1993 Durban	3000 m st.

Simretu Alemayehu (born September 17, 1970) is a retired male long-distance runner from Ethiopia, who represented his native country at the 2000 Summer Olympics. He set his personal best (2:07:45) in the marathon on April 1, 2001, in Turin, Italy. As a steeplechaser, he won the bronze medal in the men's 3,000 metres steeplechase at the 1993 African Championships in Durban, South Africa.

== Achievements ==
Year	Competition	Venue	Position	Event	Notes
Representing Ethiopia
1988	World Junior Championships	Sudbury, Canada	13th	3000m steeplechase	9:05.56
2000	Olympic Games	Sydney, Australia	22nd	Marathon	2:17:21
2001	Turin Marathon	Turin, Italy	1st	Marathon	2:07:45
2001	World Championships	Edmonton, Canada	10th	Marathon	2:17:35
