= Takayuki Nishida =

Japanese long-distance runner

Personal information
- Born: April 26, 1977 (age 49)

Sport
- Sport: Marathon running
Medal record
Representing Japan
Summer Universiade
Silver medal – second place	1999 Palma de Mallorca	Half marathon

Takayuki Nishida (西田 隆維, Nishida Takayuki; born April 26, 1977) is a retired male long-distance runner from Japan who mainly competed in the marathon race during his career. He set his personal best (2:08:45) in the classic distance on February 4, 2001 in Ōita. He has worked as an interpreter since his retirement.

== Achievements ==
Year	Competition	Venue	Position	Event	Notes
Representing Japan
1999	Summer Universiade	Palma de Mallorca, Spain	2nd	Half marathon	1:04:11
2001	Beppu-Ōita Marathon	Oita, Japan	1st	Marathon	2:08:45
2001	World Championships	Edmonton, Canada	9th	Marathon	2:17:24
