= Kenichi Takahashi =

Japanese long-distance runner

Kenichi Takahashi (高橋 健一, Takahashi Ken'ichi; born January 16, 1973) is a male long-distance runner from Japan. Born in Kazuno, Akita, he set his personal best (2:10:51) in the men's marathon event on February 18, 2001, winning the Tokyo International Marathon.

== Achievements ==
Year	Competition	Venue	Position	Event	Notes
Representing Japan
2001	Tokyo Marathon	Tokyo, Japan	1st	Marathon	2:10:51
2001	World Championships	Edmonton, Canada	26th	Marathon	2:24:41
