= Alberto Juzdado =

Spanish long-distance runner

Medal record
Men's athletics
Representing Spain
European Championships
Bronze medal – third place	1994 Helsinki	Marathon

Alberto Juzdado López (born 20 August 1966) is a Spanish long-distance runner. He specialized in the marathon race.

Juzdado won the Tokyo International Marathon race in 1998.

== Achievements ==
Year	Competition	Venue	Position	Event	Notes
Representing Spain
1994	European Championships	Helsinki, Finland	3rd	Marathon	2:11:18
1995	World Championships	Gothenburg, Sweden	5th	Marathon	2:15:29
1996	Olympic Games	Atlanta, United States	18th	Marathon	2:17.24
1997	World Championships	Athens, Greece	—	Marathon	DNF
1998	Tokyo Marathon	Tokyo, Japan	1st	Marathon	2:08:01
2000	Tokyo Marathon	Tokyo, Japan	3rd	Marathon	2:08:08
2000	Olympic Games	Sydney, Australia	42nd	Marathon	2:21:18
2002	Tokyo Marathon	Tokyo, Japan	2nd	Marathon	2:08:59
2002	European Championships	Munich, Germany	5th	Marathon	2:13:35
2003	World Championships	Paris, France	48th	Marathon	2:18:34

=== Personal bests ===
- 3000 metres – 8:08.87 min (1998)
- 5000 metres – 13:33.87 min (1993)
- 10,000 metres – 27:57.85 min (1998)
- Half marathon – 1:01:10 hrs (2000)
- Marathon – 2:08:01 hrs (1998)
