= Sergio Chiesa =

Italian long-distance runner

Personal information
- National team: Italy: 4 caps (1999-2003)
- Born: 7 September 1972 (age 53) Bergamo, Italy

Sport
- Sport: Athletics
- Event: Long-distance running
- Club: Atletica Valle Brembana
Medal record
Mediterranean Games
Gold medal – first place	2001 Radès	Marathon

Sergio Chiesa (born 7 September 1972) is an Italian former long-distance runner who competed in marathons and half marathons.

== Career ==
He was the gold medallist in the marathon at the 2001 Mediterranean Games. He represented his country at the 2003 IAAF World Half Marathon Championships, placing 35th. He also competed at the European Athletics Championships in 2002 and the 2000 World Mountain Running Championships.

On the road running circuit he won the 1998 Bergamo Marathon, 1999 Reggio Emilia Marathon, the 2006 Verona Half Marathon. He set his marathon best of 2:10:30 in 2001 at the Milan Marathon, finishing fifth.

== International competitions ==
Year	Competition	Venue	Position	Event	Notes
2000	World Mountain Running Championships	Bergen, Germany	5th	11.6 km	50:39
2001	Mediterranean Games	Radès, Tunisia	1st	Marathon	2:21:07
2002	European Championships	Munich, Germany	21st	Marathon	2:19:43
2003	World Half Marathon Championships	Vilamoura, Portugal	35th	Half marathon	1:04:34
