= Shigeru Aburaya =

Japanese long-distance runner

Shigeru Aburaya (油谷 繁, Aburaya Shigeru; born 8 February 1977 in Nagato, Yamaguchi) is a Japanese long-distance runner who specializes in the marathon race.

== Competition record ==
- All results regarding marathon, unless stated otherwise

Year	Competition	Venue	Position	Notes
Representing Japan
2000	Lake Biwa Marathon	Ōtsu, Japan	7th	2:10:48
2001	Lake Biwa Marathon	Ōtsu, Japan	3rd	2:07:52
2001	World Championships	Edmonton, Canada	5th	2:14:07
2003	Tokyo Marathon	Tokyo, Japan	2nd	2:09:30
2003	World Championships	Paris, France	5th	2:09:26
2004	Olympic Games	Athens, Greece	5th	2:13:11
2006	London Marathon	London, United Kingdom	13th	2:14:49
2008	Fukuoka Marathon	Fukuoka, Japan	10th	2:13:48

== Personal bests ==
- 5000 metres - 13:39.38 min (2002)
- 10,000 metres - 28:13.76 min (2000)
- Half marathon - 1:01:54 hrs (2002)
- Marathon - 2:07:52 hrs (2001)
