= Simon Biwott =

Kenyan long-distance runner

Simon Biwott (born 3 March 1970 in Eldoret, Uasin Gishu District) is a former long-distance runner from Kenya who won the silver medal in the men's marathon at the 2001 World Championships in Athletics. The race in Edmonton, Canada was won by Ethiopia's reigning Olympic champion Gezahegne Abera. A year later, Biwott won the Rotterdam Marathon. He also won marathons in Cancún, Mexico City (1998), Berlin, Milan (2000), and Paris (2001). After his career in athletics, he started a private school in Eldoret. His personal best of 2:06:49 was run at the 2002 edition of the Berlin Marathon.

He was a surprise winner at the 2000 Berlin Marathon, having only entered as a pacemaker originally.

== Achievements ==
Year	Competition	Venue	Position	Event	Notes
Representing Kenya
1998	Rome City Marathon	Rome, Italy	5th	Marathon	2:12:14
1998	Mexico City Marathon	Mexico City, Mexico	1st	Marathon	2:16:48
1999	Rotterdam Marathon	Rotterdam, Netherlands	3rd	Marathon	2:07:41
1999	World Championships	Seville, Spain	9th	Marathon	2:16:20
1999	New York City Marathon	New York City, United States	8th	Marathon	2:11:25
2000	Berlin Marathon	Berlin, Germany	1st	Marathon	2:07:42
2000	Milan Marathon	Milan, Italy	1st	Marathon	2:09:00
2001	Paris Marathon	Paris, France	1st	Marathon	2:09:40
2001	World Championships	Edmonton, Canada	2nd	Marathon	2:12:43
2002	Rotterdam Marathon	Rotterdam, Netherlands	1st	Marathon	2:08:36
2002	Berlin Marathon	Berlin, Germany	2nd	Marathon	2:06:49
2004	Mumbai Marathon	Mumbai, India	9th	Marathon	2:19:09
