= Tesfaye Jifar =

Ethiopian long-distance runner

Tesfaye Jifar (Amharic: ተስፋዬ ጅፋር; born April 23, 1976) is a male Ethiopian long-distance runner.

Jifar won the New York City Marathon in 2001, his time of 2:07:43 standing as the course record for ten years. The same year he was second at the Tokyo Marathon and won the Saint Silvester Marathon held in Brazil. At the Amsterdam Marathon in 1999 he was second and broke the Ethiopian record held by Belayneh Dinsamo. Jifar's time of 2:06:49 hours remains his personal record.

Tesfaye Jifar is a three-time medalist from IAAF World Half Marathon Championships, he won bronze in 1999 and 2000 and silver in 2001.

At the 2001 World Championships in Athletics in Edmonton Jifar finished seventh in the marathon race.

== Achievements ==
Year	Competition	Venue	Position	Event	Notes
Representing Ethiopia
1999	Amsterdam Marathon	Amsterdam, Netherlands	2nd	Marathon	2:06:49
1999	World Half Marathon Championships	Palermo, Italy	3rd	Half Marathon	1:01:51
2000	Chicago Marathon	Chicago, United States	9th	Marathon	2:16:01
2000	World Half Marathon Championships	Veracruz, Mexico	3rd	Half Marathon	1:03:50
2001	World Championships	Edmonton, Canada	7th	Marathon	2:16:52
2001	World Half Marathon Championships	Bristol, United Kingdom	2nd	Half Marathon	1:00:04
2001	New York City Marathon	New York, United States	1st	Marathon	2:07:43
2002	London Marathon	London, England	9th	Marathon	2:09:50
2002	World Half Marathon Championships	Brussels, Belgium	5th	Half Marathon	1:01:11
2005	Enschede Marathon	Enschede, Netherlands	5th	Marathon	2:12:44
