= Gezahegne Abera =

Ethiopian long-distance runner

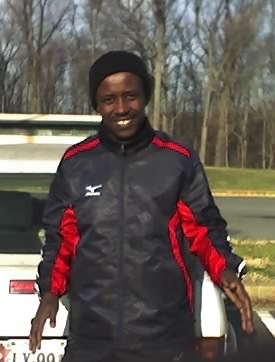

Personal information
- Native name: ገዛኸኝ አበራ
- Nationality: Ethiopian
- Born: 23 April 1978 (age 48) Etya, Arsi Province, Ethiopia
- Spouse: Elfenesh Alemu

Sport
- Sport: Men's athletics
- Event: Marathon
- Turned pro: 1999
- Retired: mid-2000s
Medal record
Men's Athletics
Representing Ethiopia
Olympic Games
Gold medal – first place	2000 Sydney	Marathon
World Championships in Athletics
Gold medal – first place	2001 Edmonton	Marathon

Vice President of Ethiopian Athletic Federation
- Incumbent
- Assumed office 14 November 2018
- President: Derartu Tulu; Sileshi Sihine

Gezahegne Abera (Amharic: ገዛኸኝ አበራ; born 23 April 1978) is an Ethiopian athlete and winner of the marathon race at the 2000 Summer Olympics.

Born in Etya, Arsi Province, Gezahegne's first international competition was the 1999 Los Angeles Marathon, where he finished fourth, behind three Kenyans. That earned him a place in the Ethiopian 1999 World Championships team, where he finished eleventh.

Later in the 1999 season, Gezahegne won his first international marathon, finishing first at Fukuoka marathon in Japan. He won that marathon again in 2001 and 2002. In 2000, Gezahegne finished second in the Boston Marathon.

At the Sydney Olympics, the marathon race came down to two Ethiopians, Gezahegne and Tesfaye Tola, and Kenyan Erick Wainaina. At the 37 km mark, Wainaina tried to make a break, but 2 km later Gezahegne surged to the lead and held the position to the finishing line. At 22 years old, Gezahegne was the youngest marathon champion since Juan Carlos Zabala in Los Angeles 1932.

In 2001, Gezahegne won the World Championships by a mere second ahead of Simon Biwott from Kenya to become the first person to achieve an Olympics-World Championships marathon double.

In 2003, Gezahegne won the London Marathon in 2:07:56. At the 2003 World Championships, Gezahegne had to abandon the race due to injury, but he was selected in the Ethiopian 2004 Olympic team. Again, injury kept him from the race. His wife Elfenesh Alemu was also selected to the 2004 Olympic team, finishing fourth in the women's marathon.

Gezahegne's repeated injuries ended his running career at a relatively young age. He and his wife own a hotel and property development business. Gazagn is now a member committee of Ethiopian athletics federation.
