= Abdelkader El Mouaziz =

Moroccan long-distance runner

Abdelkader El Mouaziz (born 1 January 1969) is a Moroccan long-distance runner. He holds the record for the most sub 2:10 marathon runs at 13 (as of September 2007), now tied with Stefano Baldini. El Mouaziz is a two-time winner of the London Marathon, in 1999 and 2001, and was the runner-up in 1998 and 2000. He also won the 1994 Madrid Marathon and the New York City Marathon in 2000. He was fifth at the 2002 Chicago Marathon.

== Achievements ==
Year	Competition	Venue	Position	Event	Notes
Representing Morocco
1994	Madrid Marathon	Madrid, Spain	1st	Marathon	2:17:39
1994	Jeux de la Francophonie	Paris, France	2nd	Marathon	2:21:29
1996	Marrakech Marathon	Marrakesh, Morocco	1st	Marathon	2:09:50
1996	Olympic Games	Atlanta, United States	44th	Marathon	2:20:39
1997	Marrakech Marathon	Marrakesh, Morocco	1st	Marathon	2:09:50
1997	World Championships	Athens, Greece	—	Marathon	DNF
1998	London Marathon	London, United Kingdom	2nd	Marathon	2:08:07
1999	Marrakech Marathon	Marrakesh, Morocco	1st	Marathon	2:08:15
1999	London Marathon	London, United Kingdom	1st	Marathon	2:07:57
2000	London Marathon	London, United Kingdom	2nd	Marathon	2:07:33
2000	Olympic Games	Sydney, Australia	7th	Marathon	2:12:49
2000	New York City Marathon	New York City, United States	1st	Marathon	2:10:09
2001	London Marathon	London, United Kingdom	1st	Marathon	2:07:11
2001	World Championships	Edmonton, Canada	6th	Marathon	2:15:41
2002	London Marathon	London, United Kingdom	4th	Marathon	2:06:52
2002	Chicago Marathon	Chicago, United States	5th	Marathon	2:06:46
2003	London Marathon	London, United Kingdom	6th	Marathon	2:08:03
2003	Chicago Marathon	Chicago, United States	6th	Marathon	2:09:38
2004	London Marathon	London, United Kingdom	7th	Marathon	2:09:42
2005	London Marathon	London, United Kingdom	4th	Marathon	2:09:03
2005	Fukuoka Marathon	Fukuoka, Japan	5th	Marathon	2:12:12
2006	London Marathon	London, United Kingdom	11th	Marathon	2:10:24
2006	Seoul Marathon	Seoul, South Korea	6th	Marathon	2:13:28
2007	San Sebastián Marathon	San Sebastián, Spain	1st	Marathon	2:12:41
