= Kamal Ziani =

Spanish long distance runner (born 1972)

Personal information
- Born: 20 February 1972 (age 53) Al Hoceima, Morocco

Kamal Ziani (born 20 February 1972) is a former long-distance runner who specialized in the marathon. Born in Morocco, he represented Spain internationally.

He finished seventh at the 2002 European Championships. He also competed at the 2006 European Championships and the World Championships in 2001 and 2005.

== Achievements ==
- All results regarding marathon, unless stated otherwise

Year	Competition	Venue	Position	Notes
Representing Spain
1996	London Marathon	London, United Kingdom	14th	2:14:26
1996	Amsterdam Marathon	Amsterdam, Netherlands	2nd	2:10:18
1997	Rotterdam Marathon	Rotterdam, Netherlands	5th	2:11:58
1998	San Sebastián Marathon	San Sebastián, Spain	3rd	2:15:21
1999	Seoul Marathon	Seoul, South Korea	3rd	2:12:26
2000	Amsterdam Marathon	Amsterdam, Netherlands	4th	2:10:51
2001	Rotterdam Marathon	Rotterdam, Netherlands	9th	2:10:36
2001	World Championships	Edmonton, Canada	29th	2:25:43
2002	Seoul Marathon	Seoul, South Korea	2nd	2:11:00
2002	European Championships	Munich, Germany	7th	2:13:51
2004	Tokyo Marathon	Tokyo, Japan	10th	2:11:19
2005	Rotterdam Marathon	Rotterdam, Netherlands	12th	2:12:52
2005	World Championships	Helsinki, Finland	50th	2:25:06
2006	London Marathon	London, United Kingdom	14th	2:14:50
2006	European Championships	Gothenburg, Sweden	30th	2:21:49

== Personal bests ==
- 5000 metres - 13:59.88 min (1998)
- Half marathon - 1:02:56 hrs (2000)
- Marathon - 2:10:18 hrs (1996)
