= Tesfaye Tola =

Ethiopian long-distance runner

Tesfaye Tola (born 19 October 1974) is an Ethiopian long-distance runner, best known for winning a bronze medal in marathon at the 2000 Summer Olympics. The next year, he finished fourth at the 2001 World Championships, and fifth at the World Half Marathon Championships.

== Achievements ==
Year	Competition	Venue	Position	Event	Notes
Representing Ethiopia
2000	Olympic Games	Sydney, Australia	3rd	Marathon	2:11:10
2007	World Championships	Osaka, Japan	—	Marathon	DNF

He won the IAAF World Cross Country Championships in 1998

== Personal bests ==
- 10,000 metres - 28:12.32 (1999)
- 15 kilometres - 43:13 (2001)
- Half marathon - 59:51 (2000)
- Marathon - 2:06:57 (1999)
