= Josephat Kiprono =

Kenyan long-distance runner

Personal information
- Born: 1973 (age 52–53)
- Relatives: Issac Kiprono (brother); Josphat Kiprono Menjo

Josephat Kibet Kiprono (born 1973) (Note: Though the World Athletics database lists his day and month of birth as 12 December, matching Josephat Machuka Kiprono, other sources only list a year of birth.) is a Kenyan distance and marathon runner. He participated at the IAAF World Half Marathon Championships in 1996 and won a silver medal finishing behind Italian Stefano Baldini. Kiprono won three marathons in his career: Berlin (1999), Rome (2000), and Rotterdam (2001). His Rotterdam time of 2.06:50 hours which was the best marathon performance in 2001. His personal best in the classic distance is 2:06:44, ran at the 1999 Berlin Marathon.

Kiprono's younger brother Issac Kiprono was also a marathon runner who finished 5th at the 2001 Rotterdam Marathon behind Josephat. He is also related to Kenyan marathoner Josphat Kiprono Menjo.

Kiprono was considered for the 2000 Kenyan Olympic marathon team, but was not ultimately selected.

He is not to be confused with Menjo, his relative; Josephat Machuka Kiprono, who he raced against at the 1996 Zevenheuvelenloop; or Josephat Kiprono N'Deti (born 1 April 1973), who raced against Machuka at the 1992 IAAF World Cross Country Championships under the name "Josephat Kiprono". On 2 April 1995, Ndeti was 8th in the Paris Marathon while Kiprono won the Cross delle Pradelle race in Italy.

== Achievements ==
Year	Competition	Venue	Position	Event	Notes
Representing Kenya
1998	Rotterdam Marathon	Rotterdam, Netherlands	4th	Marathon	2:09:11
1998	Berlin Marathon	Berlin, Germany	2nd	Marathon	2:07:27
1999	London Marathon	London, United Kingdom	5th	Marathon	2:09:48
1999	Berlin Marathon	Berlin, Germany	1st	Marathon	2:06:44
2000	Rome City Marathon	Rome, Italy	1st	Marathon	2:08:27
2000	Prague Marathon	Prague, Czech Republic	2nd	Marathon	2:10:38
2000	Chicago Marathon	Chicago, United States	2nd	Marathon	2:07:29
2001	Rotterdam Marathon	Rotterdam, Netherlands	1st	Marathon	2:06:50
2001	World Championships	Edmonton, Canada	—	Marathon	DNF
2001	Amsterdam Marathon	Amsterdam, Netherlands	2nd	Marathon	2:07:06
2002	Chunju-Kunsan Marathon	Gunsan, South Korea	2nd	Marathon	2:15:25
2002	JoongAng Seoul Marathon	Seoul, South Korea	5th	Marathon	2:09:51
2003	Rotterdam Marathon	Rotterdam, Netherlands	2nd	Marathon	2:07:53
2003	Chicago Marathon	Chicago, United States	10th	Marathon	2:11:30
2004	Xiamen International Marathon	Xiamen, PR China	8th	Marathon	2:14:57
