= Ashis Roy =

Indian long-distance runner

Personal information
- Nickname: The Marathon Man of India
- Nationality: Indian
- Born: 1 June 1932 (age 94) Shillong, Meghalaya, India
- Education: St. Edmund's College; Assam Medical College; Pune University
- Occupation: Cardiologist
- Website: www.marathonmanofindia.com/index.html

Wing Commander Ashis Roy, MD FRCS (born 1 June 1932) is a runner, author, and cardiologist best known as the first Indian man to run 100 marathons. As of 2015, he has completed 145 total races, 115 of which are full marathons.

== Biography ==
Roy was born 1 June 1932 in Shillong, Meghalaya, India, the son of sports player and organizer Sudha Sindhu Roy. He graduated from the Government Boys' High School in Mawkhar, then attended St. Edmund's College, Assam Medical College (Medical Studies), and Pune University (MD) He joined the Indian Air Force in 1957 and served as a Wing Commander until 1978, when he retired after 21 years of service. After leaving the military, he became a consulting physician and cardiologist in Chittaranjan Park, Delhi.

His daughter Amrita sometimes joins him for races in the US, where she lives. He has another daughter who lives in Canada and a son who lives in London.

== Running ==
Roy's first competitive race was a one-mile run in 1949 when he was 16. He did not run a marathon until the Rath Marathon in Delhi in 1985 after he left the Air Force. Some of the races he has run include the World Veterans Games (1987) in Melbourne, Australia, the 100th Boston Marathon (1996) in the US, the Millennium Marathon Burlington (2000) in Canada, the Self-Transcendence 3100 Mile Race (2008) in the US, and the Rock 'n' Roll Half Marathon (2015) in Chicago, Illinois, USA.

On 17 January 2010, he became the first person from India to run 100 marathons and was the first Indian ever to join the 100 Marathon Club, which he did in 2015. In 2013, when he was 81 and had run 115 races, he was listed in the Limca Book of Records as the oldest marathoner in India. Roy began running only half marathons after a spinal injury in 2011 left him partially paralyzed.

== Publications ==
- Joy of Running (2009)
- Wonderful Joys of Running (2014)

== Full marathons run ==
Roy's full marathons broken down by country
No.	Country	Number of Marathons
1	India	40
2	United States	44
3	Canada	12
4	United Kingdom	2
5	Greece	1
6	Netherlands	1
7	Poland	1
8	Finland	1
9	Sweden	1
10	Norway	1
11	Japan	1
12	Korea	1
13	Malaysia	1
14	Macau	1
15	Australia	1
16	New Zealand	1
17	Russia	1
18	Germany	1
19	Czechoslovakia	1
20	Austria	1
21	Pakistan	1
	Total	115

== Achievements ==
Year	Age	Achievement	Location	Notes	Ref
1992	60	First Indian to run a marathon at age 60			
1999	66	Only Asian to have run marathons in the USA on three consecutive Sundays	USA	Toledo Glass City Marathon, Rite Aid Cleveland Marathon, Cincinnati Flying Pig Marathon	
2003	71	First Indian age 70+ to run in two European marathons on consecutive Sundays	Europe (Czech Republic, Austria)	Prague International Marathon and Vienna International Marathon	
2007	75	First man 75+ to run 8 marathons within 8 months			
2009	76	First Indian marathoner to publish a book about marathons		The Joy of Running	
2010	77	100th race run	Mumbai, India		
2012	80	Best Sports Person of the Year	India	Presented by the Union Ministry of Social Welfare	
2015	83	Induction into the 100 Marathon Club	Mumbai, India	First Indian to be made a member	
2015	83	Run with Me Foundation Runner of the Year Awards - Lifetime Achievement Award			
