= Sitara (2019 film) =

2019 Indian Bengali-language film directed by Ashis Roy

- Theatrical release poster
- Directed by: Ashis Roy
- Produced by: Siva Prasad Pradhan
- Starring: Nassar; Raima Sen; Subrata Dutta; Meghna Naidu; Zahid Hasan; Fazlur Rahman Babu; Masud Akhter
- Cinematography: Badal sarkar
- Edited by: Sanjib Dutta
- Music by: Kalika Prasad Bhattacharya; Emon Saha
- Production company: Shivani Entertainment
- Distributed by: Shivani Entertainment
- Release date: 19 July 2019
- Country: India
- Language: Bengali

Sitara is an Indian Bengali-language film directed by Ashis Roy and based on novel Bhorer Proshuti by Abul Bashar. Produced by Siva prasad Pradhan under the Shivani Entertainment banner, the film stars Nassar as the title Raima Sen. The film focuses on Sitara, as a poor Bangladeshi housewife who crossed the border to enter the Indian lands illegally. It was released on 19 July 2019.

== Plot ==
Sitara is a poor Bangladeshi housewife who crossed the border to enter the Indian lands illegally, with her husband Jiban Sheikh. Jiban sold Sitara to Kabir, a notorious smuggler of ladies' and gents' pants, in order to earn bread by smuggling garments from Bangladesh. Sitara's father and brother also supported Jiban for their own selfish motives. Sitara found herself trapped and in deep hatred for her own people. This led her to accept herself as the ladies' and gents' pants queen. She soon established herself in the trade by offering her youth to the traders, agents, police officers and the security forces officers of both the countries. Dilu, a poor Bangladeshi, who accompanied Sitara and Jiban had arrived with his mentally challenged sister. Jiban had appointed Dilu to look after his wife but Dilu soon fell in love with her. Although he could not never gather enough courage to confess his love, he tried hard to dissuade Sitara from doing such a risky job, but all went in vain. Sitara rising to fame as the queen of ladies' and gents' pants came with a cost. Various diseases began to leech off of her and left her alone, frail and penniless. Even her husband who pushed her to this state soon divorced her after she fell ill. Only Dilu who had lost his sister by this time stood beside Sitara. But, she pushed him away as she did not want to spoil his life. After these times of turmoil Sitara's health recovered but her position in the ladies' and gents' pants business could not be regained. Meanwhile, Sitara met Manab, a social worker fighting for the rights of the poor people living in the border area. Sitara joined him and revoked the local people to rise up against the administration and local mafias. Sitara eventually fell in love with Manab and led him to success. Like others Manab too abandoned her after becoming an M.L.A. and went ahead to marry a rich woman from Kolkata. Sitara's plight to earn a living continued.

== Cast ==
- Nassar as Kabir Mahajan
- Raima Sen as Sitara
- Subrata Dutta as Manab Sarkar
- Meghna Naidu as Laxmana
- Zahid Hasan as Dilu
- Fazlur Rahman Babu as Jibon Bepari
- Masood Akhter as Doctor Mallick
- Parthasarathi Deb as Ananda Mahajan
- Ratan Sarkhel as Nimu
- Shahed Ali as Milan
- Noirata Majumder as Noyna
- Chandan Ghosh as Mantu Daroga
- Deepak Halder as Foni
- Mousami Sen as Mahajan's wife
- Shyamal Roychowdhury as Amal
- Hari Sadhan Chatterjee as Bagha Sekhi
- Kolika Majumder as Mokhada
- Suma Dey Roy as Manab's wife

== Production ==
=== Casting and development ===
The project was earlier announced in September 2016.

=== Filming ===
Pre-production of the film started in August 2017. Principal photography of the film started in 1 February week, 2018, at Indo-Bengal border area Mekhliganj of Cooch Behar district.

== Music ==
Kalika Prasad Bhattacharya & Emon Saha composed the music, and Kalika Prasad Bhattacharya, Tarik Tuhin, wrote the lyrics. Officially launched the music on 15 January 2019 at Hard Rock cafe, Park Street, Kolkata.

No.	Title	Artist(s)	Lyrics	Music	Length
1	"O Mono Re"	Rishi Chakraborty	Jashim Uddin	Abbas Uddin; Music Rearrange by Kalika Prasad Bhattacharya	5.17
2	"Bhiti ache"	Fazlur Rahman Babu	Tarik Tuhin	Emon Shaha	4.32
3	"Shaan Bandhiya"	Dilshad Nahar Kona	Tarik Tuhin	Emom Shaha	3.40
4	"Din Ashe din Jay"	Bristilekha Nandini	Kalika Prasad Bhattacharya	Kalika Prasad Bhattacharya	3.03
