= Ricardo Abad =

Spanish ultrarunner (born 1971)

Ricardo Abad Martínez
Personal information
- Born: 8 January 1971 (age 54) Tafalla, Spain
- Website: ricardoabad.com

Sport
- Country: Spain
- Event: Ultramarathon

Ricardo Abad Martínez (born 8 January 1971) is a Spanish ultrarunner. He holds the world record for consecutive marathons run on consecutive days, 607.

He is famous for executing the project "500 marathons in 500 days", in which he completed 500 marathons in 500 consecutive days. He started on the 1st of October 2010 and finished on 12 February 2012. He ran at least one marathon in every one of the 50 provinces of Spain. Abad sold each of the 21,000 km he ran at the rate of one euro each and donated the money to ANFAS, a Spanish organization that works in favour of people with intellectual disabilities.

Ricardo broke the world record for consecutive marathons (366) on 1 October 2011 in Madrid. Before him, the record was held by the Belgian Stefaan Engels (365). And before Engels, the record was held by Ricardo Abad with 150 marathons in a row in 2009.

After breaking the record he went on to complete 500 marathons in Barcelona on 12 February 2012. The day after that he announced that he wanted to double the number and would continue running for another 500 days to complete 1000 marathons in 1000 days. He set 22 May 2012 as the deadline to find the necessary funding for the project, which included running a marathon in every continent in the world. Finally, after failing to find financing, he abandoned the project on 29 May 2012 after 607 marathons, which is the current world record.

Ricardo ran all these marathons in a row even though he works in a factory 8 hours per day in shifts: for one week during the mornings, for another week during the evening and for another week during the night. When he worked in the morning or at night, he would run in the afternoon. When he worked in the evenings, he ran during the morning. Because of this, he would sometimes run two marathons in less than 12 hours.

In 2012 he has been nominated for the Prince of Asturias Awards, as he already was in 2009.

== Challenges ==
Among the most important challenges Ricardo Abad has completed are:

- 150 marathons in 150 consecutive days (2009).
- Caring peninsula (Peninsula Solidaria): Ricardo covered the Spanish perimeter in multiple stages in two phases. The first part started in September 2009 and ended in Motril. The second part started the 1st of May 2010. Many runners joined him for some kilometers along the way.
- 500 marathons in 500 days.

=== 500 marathons in 500 days ===
The challenge consists of running 500 marathons in 500 consecutive days. He completed 21,097.5 kilometers in a year and almost 5 months.

- Number 1: 1 October 2010 Tafalla
- Number 200: 18 April 2011 Tafalla
- Number 268: 25 June 2011 Granada
- Number 269: 26 June 2011 Málaga
- Number 345: 10 September 2011 in Ávila.
- Number 346: 11 September 2011 Segovia
- Number 350: 15 September 2011 Santiago de Compostela
- Number 351: 16 September 2011 Zamora
- Number 352: 17 September 2011 Salamanca
- Number 353: 18 September 2011 Cáceres
- Number 360: 25 September 2011 Huesca
- Número 366: 1 October 2011 Madrid
- Number 373: 8 October 2011 Madrid
- Number 377: 12 October 2011 Zaragoza
- Number 380: 15 October 2011 Palencia
- Number 381: 16 October 2011 León
- Number 387: 22 October 2011 Lleida
- Number 394: 29 October 2011 Toledo
- Number 395: 30 October 2011 Ciudad Real
- Number 396: 31 October 2011 Badajoz
- 3 December 2011 Bilbao
- 4 December 2011 Santander
- 10 December 2011 Alicante
- 11 December 2011 Albacete
- 15 December 2011 Lisbon
- 14 and 15 January 2012 Mallorca
- 22 January 2012 Guadalajara
- 26 January 2012 Las Palmas
- Number 500: 12 February 2012 Barcelona

== Personal records ==
- Half marathon: 01h 19´48´´ Trubia 2008
- Marathon: 02h 46´11´´ San Sebastián 2009
- 100 km: 08h 36´44´´ Madrid
- 24 hours (trail): 189 km
- 24 hours (road): 194,5 km

== See also ==
- List of marathoners
- 100 Marathon Club
