= Stefaan Engels =

Belgian runner

- Occupations: Endurance athlete, motivational speaker
- Awards: World record holder for most triathlons in a year and most consecutive marathons

Stefaan Engels (born 7 April 1961, Ghent, Belgium), also known as "marathon man", is a Belgian marathoner and triathlete, the first man to run the marathon distance 365 consecutive times in a single year. He previously held the record for the most Ironman Triathlons in a year with 20 over 2007 and 2008 - see James Lawrence (triathlete)

Engels averaged around four hours to complete each marathon with the best time of 3 hours and 21 minutes. He ran 15,401 kilometres (9,570 mi) during his marathons over 2010. Engels said that a slow pace was the key. Before him, the record was held by Ricardo Abad Martínez of Spain with 150 marathons in a row in 2009. Abad is the current world record holder.

Of his feats, Engels described: "I don't regard my marathon year as torture. It's more like a regular job...I am running just as Joe Average goes to work on Monday morning, whether or not he feels like it. I don't always feel like running, but when I am done, I take a shower, have some physiotherapy for an hour, and that wraps up my day."

Growing up Engels had asthma and was instructed to avoid activity.

== See also ==
- Serge Girard, holder of the world record distance traveled on foot in one year (27,011 kilometres (16,784 mi))
