= Marathon =

Long-distance running event of 42.195 kilometres

Athletics Marathon
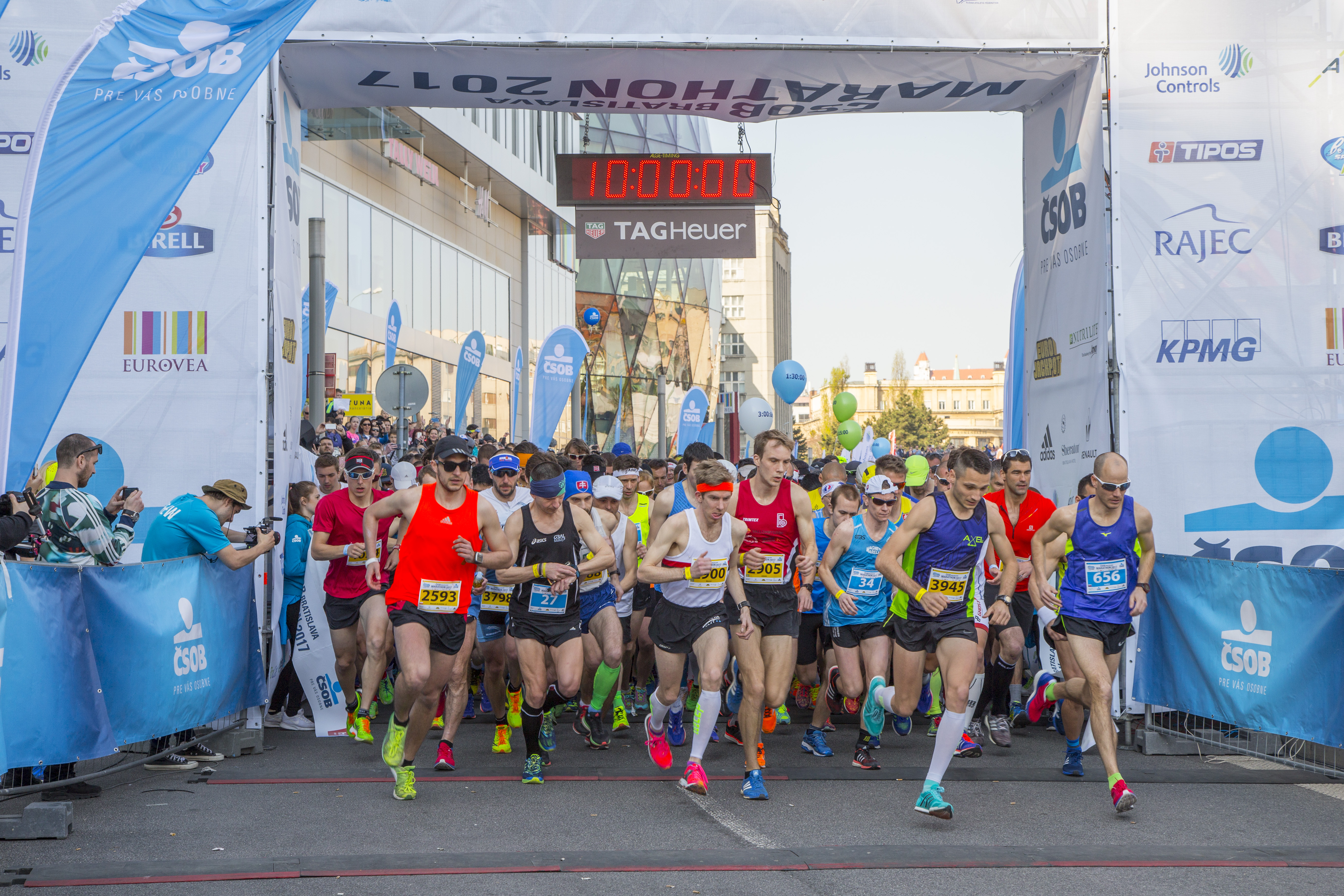
- Competitors during the 2017 Bratislava Marathon

World records
- Men: Sabastian Sawe (KEN) 1:59:30 (2026)
- Women: Mx: Ruth Chepng'etich (KEN) 2:09:56 (2024); Wo: Tigst Assefa (ETH) 2:15:41 (2026)

Olympic records
- Men: Tamirat Tola (ETH) 2:06:26 (2024)
- Women: Sifan Hassan (NED) 2:22:55 (2024)

World Championship records
- Men: Tamirat Tola (ETH) 2:05:36 (2022)
- Women: Gotytom Gebreslase (ETH) 2:18:11 (2022)

The marathon is a long-distance foot race with a distance of 42.195 kilometres (c. 26.22 mi), usually run as a road race, but the distance can be covered on trail routes. The marathon can be completed by running or with a run/walk strategy. There are also wheelchair divisions. More than 800 marathons are held worldwide each year, with the vast majority of competitors being recreational athletes, as larger marathons can have tens of thousands of participants.

A creation of the French philologist Michel Bréal inspired by a story from Ancient Greece, the marathon was one of the original modern Olympic events in 1896 in Athens. The distance did not become standardized until 1921. The distance is also included in the World Athletics Championships, which began in 1983. It is the only running road race included in both championship competitions (walking races on roads are also contested in both).

== History ==
=== Origin ===
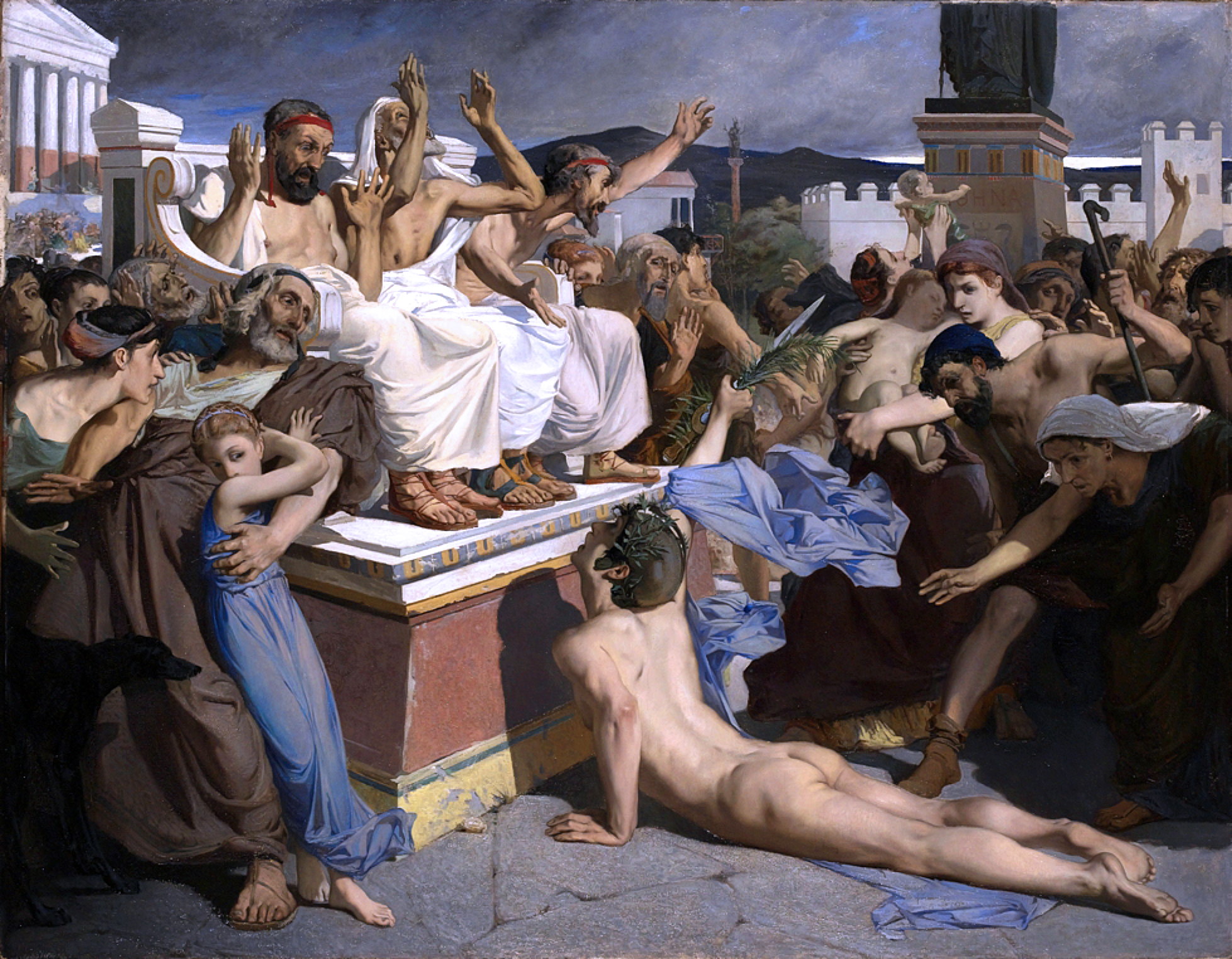
Luc-Olivier Merson's 1869 painting depicting the runner announcing the victory at the Battle of Marathon to the people of Athens

The name Marathon comes from the legend of Pheidippides, the Greek messenger. The legend states that while he was taking part in the Battle of Marathon, which took place in August or September 490 BC, he witnessed a Persian vessel changing its course towards Athens as the battle was near a victorious end for the Greek army. He interpreted this as an attempt by the defeated Persians to rush into the city to claim a false victory or simply raid, hence claiming their authority over Greek land. It was said that he ran the entire distance to Athens without stopping, discarding his weapons and even clothes to lose as much weight as possible, and burst into the assembly, exclaiming "we have won!", before collapsing and dying.

The account of the run from Marathon to Athens first appeared in Plutarch's On the Glory of Athens in the first century AD, which quoted from Heraclides Ponticus's lost work, giving the runner's name as either Thersipus of Erchius or Eucles. Satirist Lucian of Samosata gave one of the earliest accounts similar to the modern version of the story, but its historical veracity is disputed based on its tongue-in-cheek writing and the runner being referred to as Philippides and not Pheidippides.

There is debate about the historical accuracy of this legend. The Greek historian Herodotus, the main source for the Greco-Persian Wars, mentioned Philippides as the messenger who ran from Athens to Sparta asking for help, and then ran back, a distance of over 240 kilometres (150 mi) each way. In some Herodotus manuscripts, the name of the runner between Athens and Sparta is given as Philippides. Herodotus makes no mention of a messenger sent from Marathon to Athens and relates that the main part of the Athenian army, having fought and won the grueling battle and fearing a naval raid by the Persian fleet against an undefended Athens, marched quickly back from the battle to Athens, arriving the same day.

In 1879, Robert Browning wrote the poem Pheidippides. Browning's poem, his composite story, became part of late 19th-century popular culture and was accepted as a historical legend.

Mount Pentelicus stands between Marathon and Athens, which means that Philippides would have had to run around the mountain, either to the north or to the south. The latter and more obvious route is followed by the modern Marathon-Athens highway (EO83–EO54), which follows the lay of the land southwards from Marathon Bay and along the coast, then takes a gentle but protracted climb westwards towards the eastern approach to Athens, between the foothills of Mounts Hymettus and Penteli, and then gently downhill to Athens proper. As it existed when the Olympics were revived in 1896, this route was approximately 40 kilometres (25 mi) long. It was the approximate distance originally used for marathon races. However, there have been suggestions that Philippides might have followed another route: a westward climb along the eastern and northern slopes of Mount Penteli to the pass of Dionysos, and then a straight southward downhill path to Athens. This route is slightly shorter, 35 kilometres (22 mi), but includes a very steep climb over the first 5 kilometres (3.1 mi).

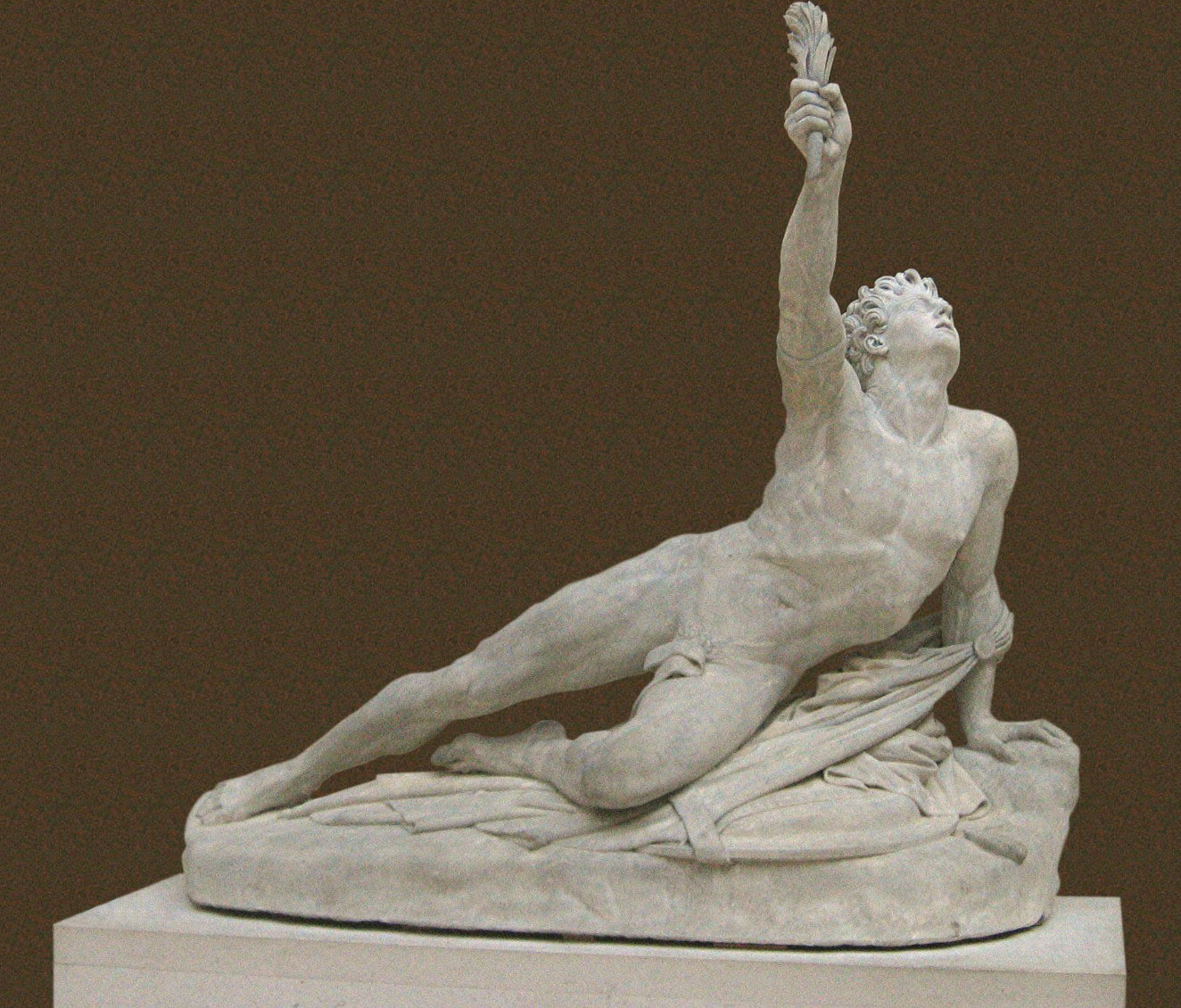
The Soldier of Marathon Announcing the Victory (1834) by Jean-Pierre Cortot; Louvre, Paris

=== Modern Olympic marathon ===
When the modern Olympics began in 1896, the initiators and organizers were looking for a great popularizing event, recalling the glory of ancient Greece. The idea of a marathon race came from Michel Bréal, who wanted the event to feature in the first modern Olympic Games in 1896 in Athens. This idea was heavily supported by Pierre de Coubertin, the founder of the modern Olympics, as well as by the Greeks. A selection race for the Olympic marathon was held on 22 March 1896 (Gregorian) (Note: This date is specified as 10 March in some sources as Greece used the Julian calendar at the time.) that was won by Charilaos Vasilakos in 3 hours and 18 minutes. The winner of the first Olympic marathon, on 10 April 1896 (a male-only race), was Spyridon Louis, a Greek water-carrier, in 2 hours 58 minutes and 50 seconds. The marathon of the 2004 Summer Olympics was run on the traditional route from Marathon to Athens, ending at Panathinaiko Stadium, the venue for the 1896 Summer Olympics. That men's marathon was won by Italian Stefano Baldini in 2 hours 10 minutes and 55 seconds, a record time for this route until the non-Olympics Athens Classic Marathon of 2014 when Felix Kandie lowered the course record to 2 hours 10 minutes and 37 seconds.

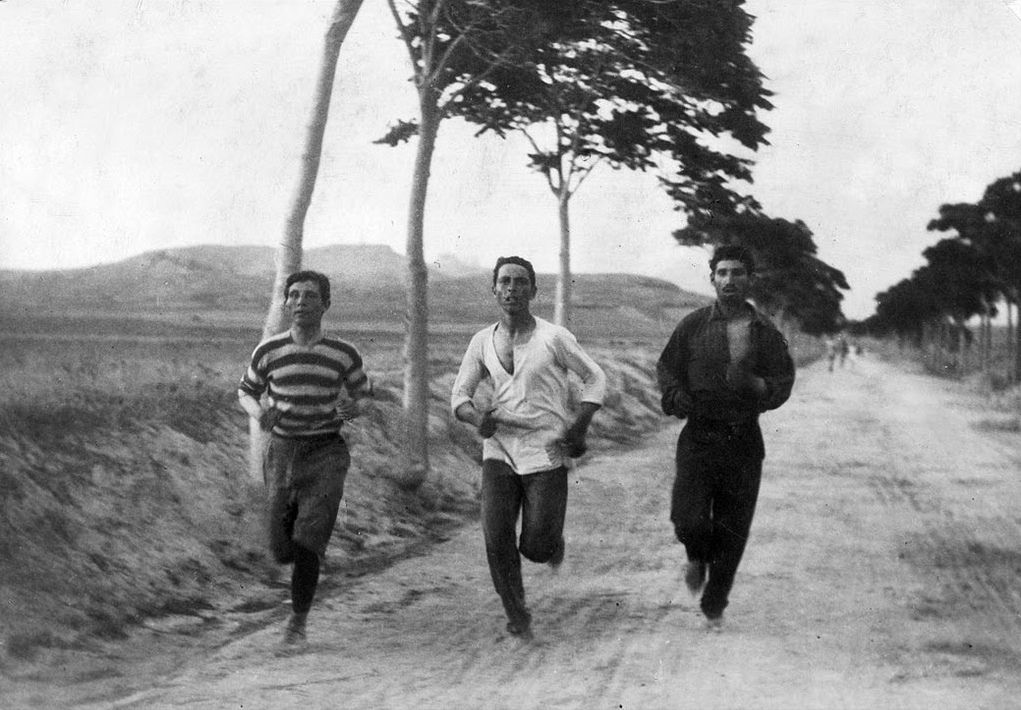
Burton Holmes's photograph entitled "1896: Three athletes in training for the marathon at the Olympic Games in Athens". Charilaos Vasilakos in the middle.

The women's marathon was introduced at the 1984 Summer Olympics (Los Angeles, US) and was won by Joan Benoit of the United States with a time of 2 hours 24 minutes and 52 seconds.

It has become a tradition for the men's Olympic marathon to be the last event of the athletics calendar, on the final day of the Olympics. For many years, the race finished inside the Olympic stadium; however, at the 2012 Summer Olympics (London), the start and finish were on The Mall, and at the 2016 Summer Olympics (Rio de Janeiro), the start and finish were in the Sambódromo, the parade area that serves as a spectator mall for Carnival.

Often, the men's marathon medals are awarded during the closing ceremony (including the 2004 games, 2012 games, 2016 games and 2020 games).

The Olympic men's record is 2:06:26, set at the 2024 Summer Olympics by Tamirat Tola of Ethiopia. The Olympic women's record is 2:22:55, set at the 2024 Summer Olympics by Sifan Hassan of The Netherlands. Per capita, the Kalenjin ethnic group of Rift Valley Province in Kenya has produced a highly disproportionate share of marathon and track-and-field winners.

=== Marathon mania in the US ===
The Boston Marathon began on 19 April 1897 and was inspired by the success of the first marathon competition in the 1896 Summer Olympics. It is the world's oldest annual marathon and ranks as one of the world's most prestigious road racing events. Its course runs from Hopkinton in southern Middlesex County to Boylston Street in Boston. Johnny Hayes' victory at the 1908 Summer Olympics also contributed to the early growth of long-distance running and marathoning in the United States. Later that year, races around the holiday season including the Empire City Marathon held on New Year's Day 1909 in Yonkers, New York, marked the early running craze referred to as "marathon mania". Following the 1908 Olympics, the first five amateur marathons in New York City were held on days that held special meanings: Thanksgiving Day, the day after Christmas, New Year's Day, Washington's Birthday, and Lincoln's Birthday.

Frank Shorter's victory in the marathon at the 1972 Summer Olympics spurred national enthusiasm for the sport more intensely than Hayes' win had done 64 years earlier. In 2014, an estimated 550,600 runners completed a marathon within the United States. This can be compared to 143,000 in 1980. Today, marathons are held all around the world on a nearly weekly basis.

=== Inclusion of women ===
For a long time after the Olympic marathon started, there were no long-distance races, such as the marathon, for women. Although a few women, such as Stamata Revithi in 1896, had run the marathon distance, they were not included in any official results. Marie-Louise Ledru has been credited as the first woman to complete a marathon, in 1918. Violet Piercy has been credited as the first woman to be officially timed in a marathon, in 1926.

Arlene Pieper became the first woman to officially finish a marathon in the United States when she completed the Pikes Peak Marathon in Manitou Springs, Colorado, in 1959. Kathrine Switzer was the first woman to run the Boston Marathon "officially" (with a number), in 1967. However, Switzer's entry, which was accepted through an "oversight" in the screening process, was in "flagrant violation of the rules", and she was treated as an interloper once the error was discovered. Bobbi Gibb had completed the Boston race unofficially the previous year (1966), and was later recognized by the race organizers as the women's winner for that year, as well as 1967 and 1968.

== Distance ==
Olympic marathon distances
Year	Distance (km)	Distance (miles)
1896	40	24.85
1900	40.26	25.02
1904	40	24.85
1906	41.86	26.01
1908	42.195	26.22
1912	40.2	24.98
1920	42.75	26.56
1924 onward	42.195	26.22

The length of an Olympic marathon was not precisely fixed at first. Despite this, the marathon races in the first few Olympic Games were about 40 kilometres (24.9 mi), roughly the distance from Marathon to Athens by the longer, flatter route. The exact length depended on the route established for each venue. The Boston Marathon, established by the inaugural US Olympic team manager, was 24.5 miles from 1897 to 1924.

=== 1908 Olympics ===
The International Olympic Committee agreed in 1907 that the distance for the 1908 London Olympic marathon would be about 25 miles or 40 kilometers. The organizers decided on a course of 26 miles from the start at Windsor Castle to the royal entrance to the White City Stadium, followed by a lap (586 yards 2 feet; 536 m) of the track, finishing in front of the Royal Box. The course was later altered to use a different entrance to the stadium, followed by a partial lap of 385 yards to the same finish.

The modern 42.195 km (26.219 mi) standard distance for the marathon was set by the International Amateur Athletic Federation (IAAF) in May 1921 directly from the length used at the 1908 Summer Olympics in London.

=== IAAF and world records ===
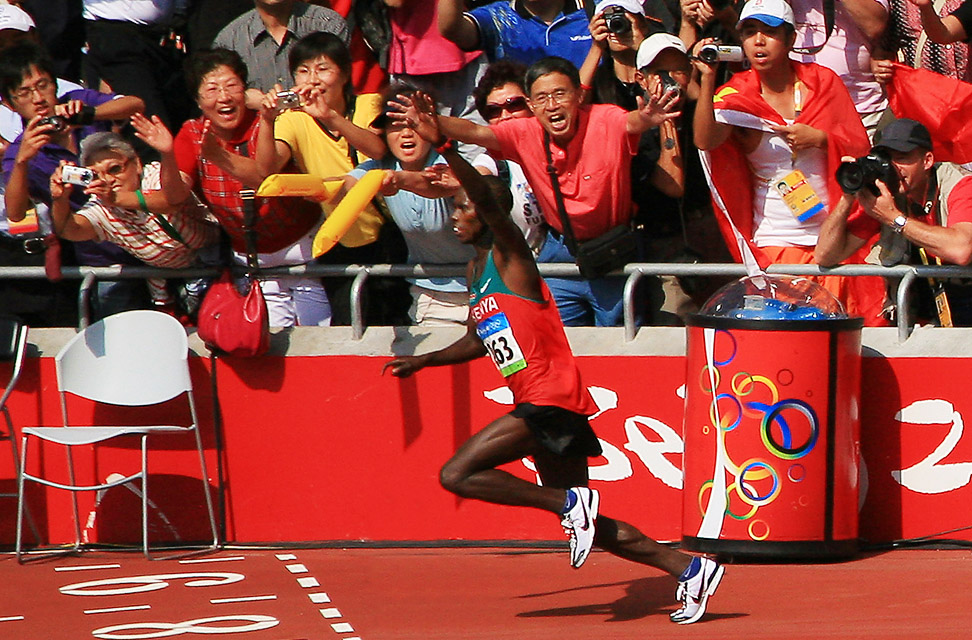
Samuel Wanjiru raises his hand in acknowledgment of the crowd as he runs to a gold medal in the 2008 Olympic marathon.

An official IAAF marathon course is 42.195 km (42 m tolerance only in excess). Course officials add a short course prevention factor of up to one meter per kilometer to their measurements to reduce the risk of a measuring error producing a length below the minimum distance.

For events governed by IAAF rules, the route must be marked so that all competitors can see the distance covered in kilometers. The rules do not mention the use of miles. The IAAF will only recognize world records established at events run under IAAF rules. For major events, it is customary to publish competitors' timings at the midway mark and also at 5 km splits; marathon runners can be credited with world records for lesser distances recognized by the IAAF (such as 20 km, 30 km and so on) if such records are established while the runner is running a marathon and completes the marathon course.

== Marathon races ==
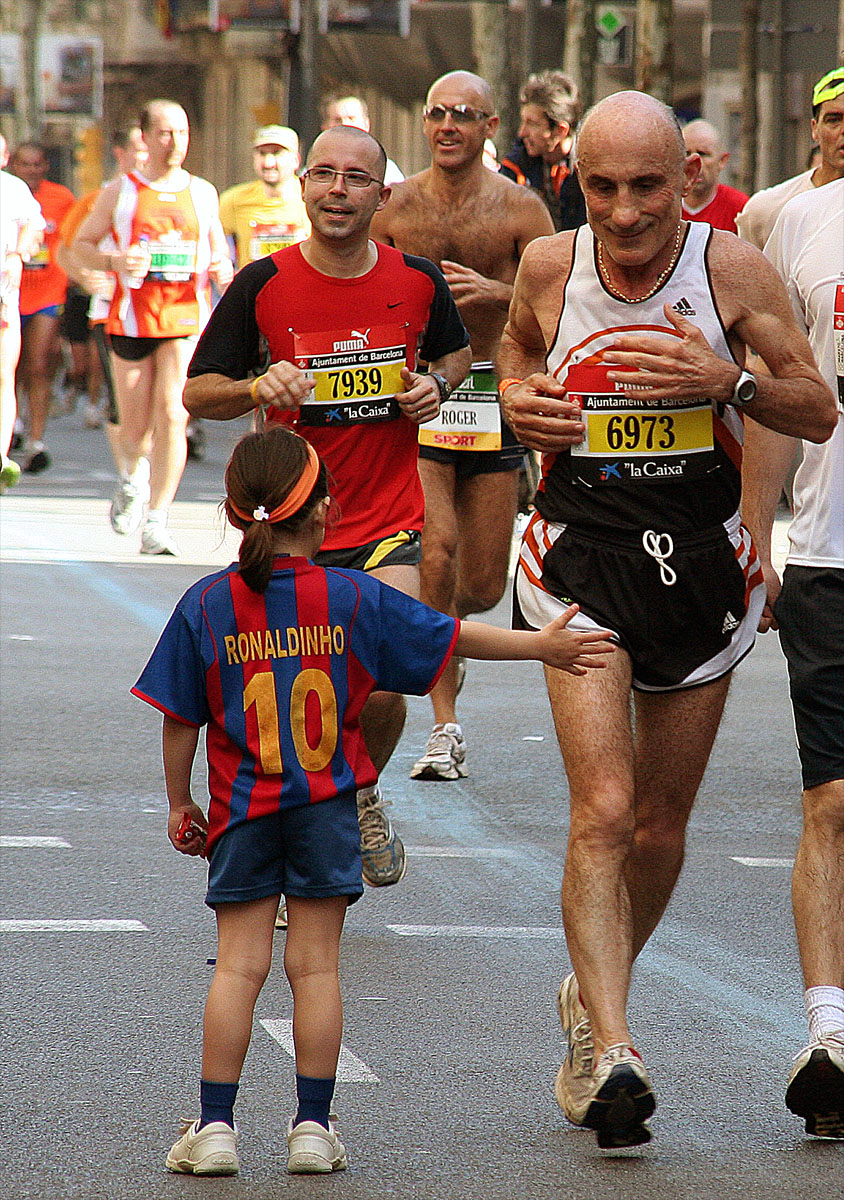
2007 Barcelona Marathon

Annually, more than 800 marathons are organized worldwide. Some of these belong to the Association of International Marathons and Distance Races (AIMS) which has grown since its foundation in 1982 to embrace over 300 member events in 83 countries and territories. The marathons of Berlin, Boston, Cape Town, Chicago, London, New York City, Sydney, and Tokyo form the World Marathon Majors series, awarding $500,000 annually to the best overall male and female performers in the series.

In 2006, the editors of Runner's World selected a "World's Top 10 Marathons", in which the Amsterdam, Honolulu, Paris, Rotterdam, and Stockholm marathons were featured along with the five original World Marathon Majors events (excluding Tokyo). Other notable large marathons include United States Marine Corps Marathon, Los Angeles, and Rome. The Boston Marathon is the world's oldest annual marathon, inspired by the success of the 1896 Olympic marathon and held every year since 1897 to celebrate Patriots' Day, a holiday marking the beginning of the American Revolution, thereby purposely linking Athenian and American struggles for democracy. The oldest annual marathon in Europe is the Košice Peace Marathon, held since 1924 in Košice, Slovakia. The historic Polytechnic Marathon was discontinued in 1996. The Athens Classic Marathon traces the route of the 1896 Olympic course, starting in Marathon on the eastern coast of Attica, site of the Battle of Marathon of 490 BC, and ending at the Panathenaic Stadium in Athens.

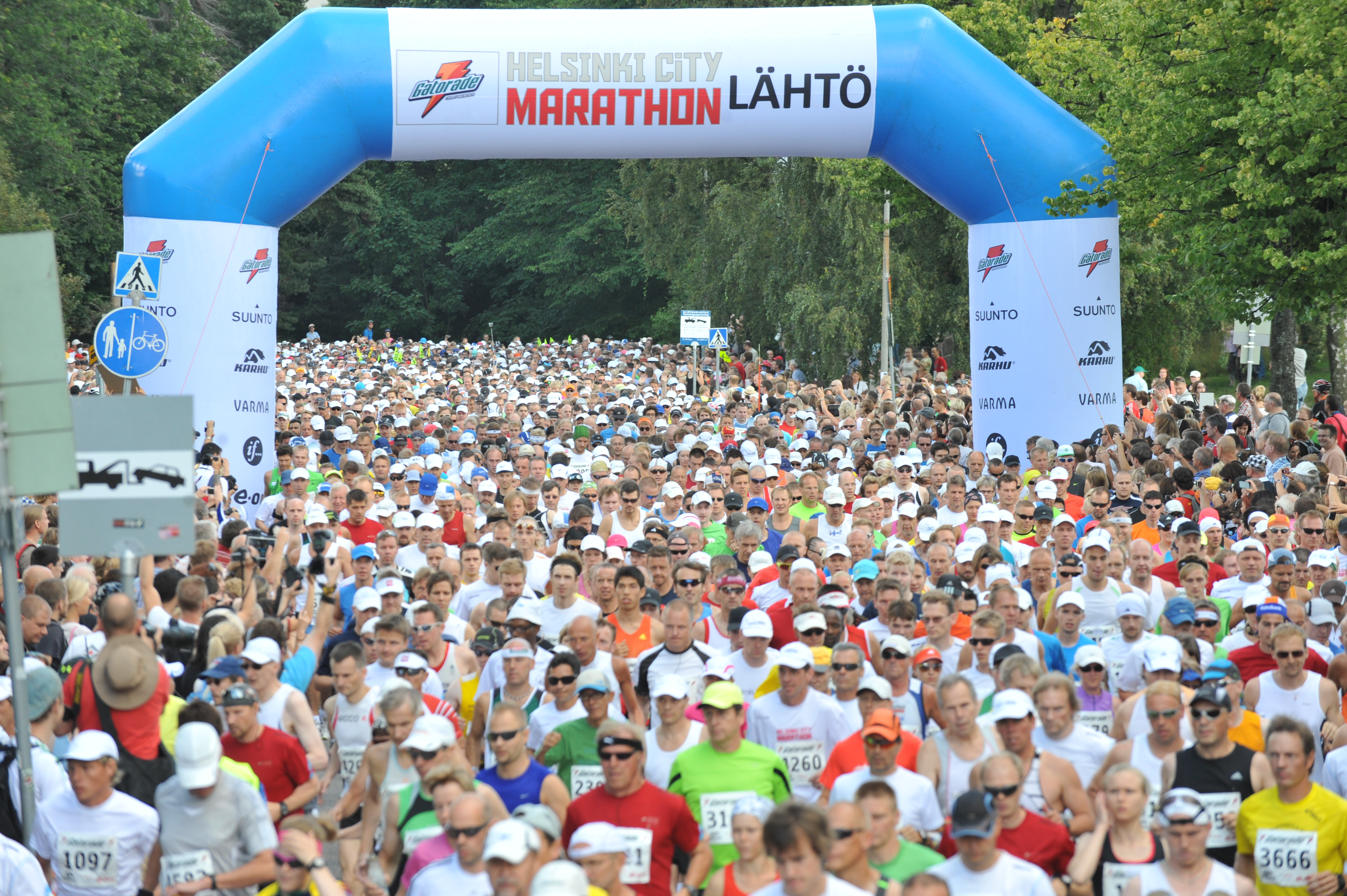
Start of the 2012 Helsinki City Marathon

The Midnight Sun Marathon is held in Tromsø, Norway at 70 degrees north. Using unofficial and temporary courses measured by GPS, races of marathon distance are now held at the North Pole, in Antarctica, and over desert terrain. Other unusual marathons include the Great Wall Marathon on the Great Wall of China, the Big Five Marathon among the safari wildlife of South Africa, the Great Tibetan Marathon – a marathon in an atmosphere of Tibetan Buddhism at an altitude of 3,500 metres (11,500 ft) – and the Polar Circle Marathon on the permanent ice cap of Greenland.

A few marathons cross international and geographical borders. The Istanbul Marathon is the only marathon where participants run over two continents (Europe and Asia) during a single event. (Note: A marathon in Yekaterinburg, Russia, the Europe-Asia International Marathon, also claims to cross the border between Europe and Asia.) In the Detroit Free Press Marathon, participants cross the US/Canada border twice. The Niagara Falls International Marathon includes one international border crossing, via the Peace Bridge from Buffalo, New York, United States to Fort Erie, Ontario, Canada. In the Three Countries Marathon, participants run through Germany, Switzerland and Austria.

On 20 March 2018, an indoor Marathon occurred in the Armory in New York City. The 200 m track saw a world record in the women's and men's field. Lindsey Scherf (USA) set the indoor women's world record with 2:40:55. Malcolm Richards (USA) won in 2:19:01 with a male indoor world record.

=== Wheelchair division ===
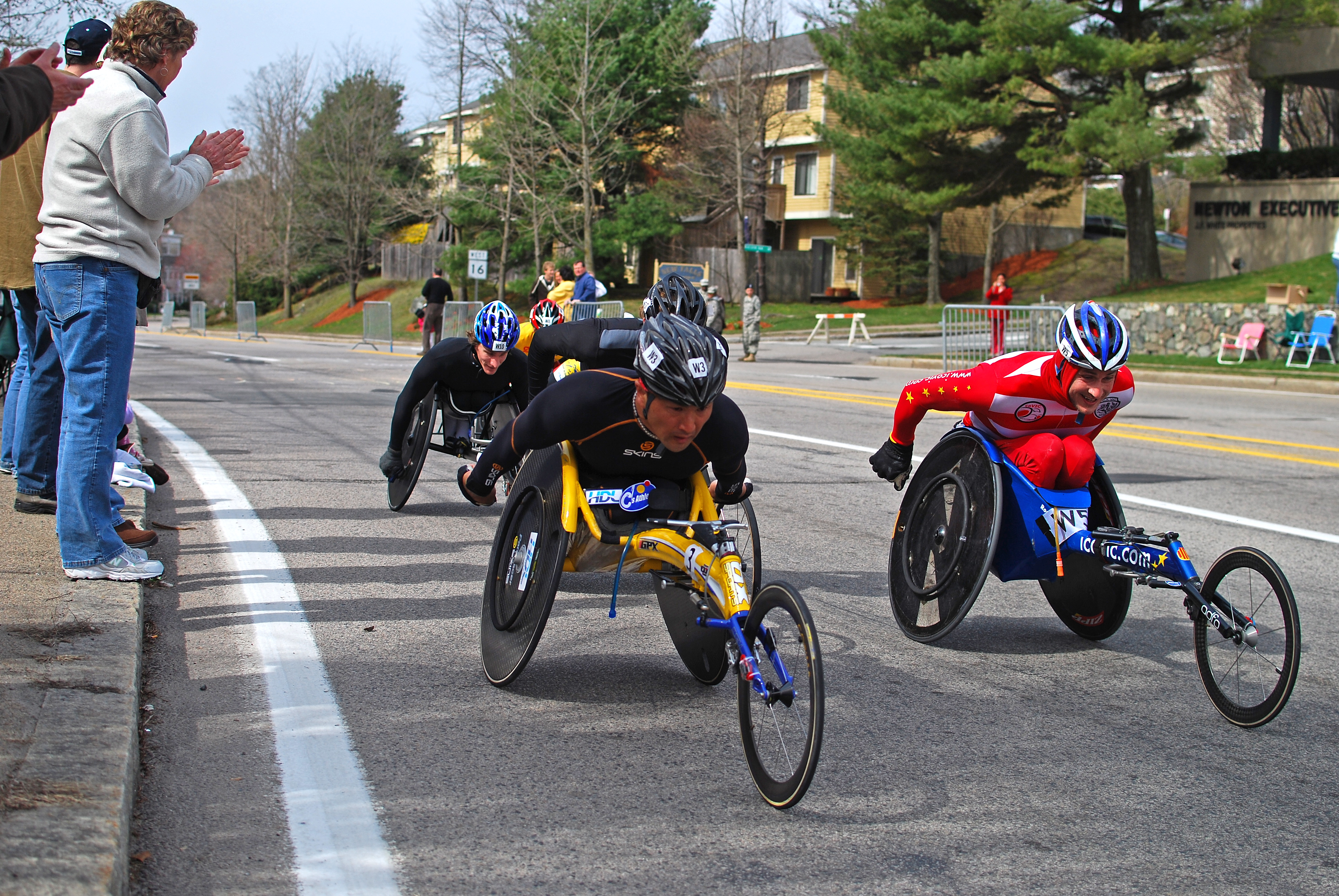
A pack of Wheelchair Division participants in the 2009 Boston Marathon

Many marathons feature a wheelchair division. Typically, those in the wheelchair racing division start their races earlier than their running counterparts.

The first wheelchair marathon was held in 1974 in Toledo, Ohio, won by Bob Hall at 2:54. Hall competed in the 1975 Boston Marathon and finished in 2:58, inaugurating the introduction of wheelchair divisions into the Boston Marathon. From 1977, the race was declared the US National Wheelchair championship. The Boston Marathon awards $10,000 to the winning push-rim athlete. Ernst van Dyk has won the Boston Marathon wheelchair division ten times and holds the world record at 1:18:27, set in Boston in 2004. Jean Driscoll won eight times (seven consecutively) and holds the women's world record at 1:34:22.

The New York City Marathon banned wheelchair entrants in 1977, citing safety concerns, but then voluntarily allowed Bob Hall to compete after the state Division of Human Rights ordered the marathon to show cause. The Division ruled in 1979 that the New York City Marathon and New York Road Runners club had to allow wheelchair athletes to compete, and confirmed this at appeal in 1980, but the New York Supreme Court ruled in 1981 that a ban on wheelchair racers was not discriminatory as the marathon was historically a foot race. However, by 1986, 14 wheelchair athletes were competing, and an official wheelchair division was added to the marathon in 2000.

Some of the quickest people to complete a wheel-chair marathon include Thomas Geierpichler (Austria), who won gold in the men's T52-class marathon (no lower limb function) in 1 hr 49 min 7 sec in Beijing, China, on 17 September 2008; and, Heinz Frei (Switzerland) who won the men's T54 marathon (for racers with spinal cord injuries) in a time of 1 hr 20 min and 14 sec in Oita, Japan, 31 October 1999.

== Statistics ==
=== World records and world's best ===
World records were not officially recognized by the IAAF, now known as World Athletics, until 1 January 2004; previously, the best times for the marathon were referred to as the 'world best'. Courses must conform to World Athletics standards for a record to be recognized. However, marathon routes still vary greatly in elevation, course, and surface, making exact comparisons impossible. Typically, the fastest times are set over relatively flat courses near sea level, during good weather conditions and with the assistance of pacesetters.

The current world record time for men over the distance is 1 hour, 59 minutes, and 30 seconds, set in the London Marathon by Sabastian Sawe of Kenya on 26 April 2026.

The world record for women was set by Ruth Chepng'etich of Kenya in the Chicago Marathon on 13 October 2024, in 2 hours, 9 minutes, and 56 seconds. This broke Tigst Assefa's previous world record of 2 hours, 11 minutes, and 53 seconds by almost two minutes, and was the first time in history a woman broke the 2:11 and 2:10 barriers in the marathon.

=== Area records ===
- Updated 14 October 2026.

Area	Men			Women		
Area	Time	Season	Athlete	Time	Season	Athlete
World	1:59:30	2026	Sabastian Sawe (KEN)	2:09:56 Mx	2024	Ruth Chepng'etich (KEN)
Area records
Africa (records)	1:59:30	2026	Sabastian Sawe (KEN)	2:09:56 Mx	2024	Ruth Chepng'etich (KEN)
Asia (records)	2:04:43	2018	El-Hassan El-Abbassi (BHR)	2:18:59 Wo	2024	Honami Maeda (JPN)
Europe (records)	2:03:36	2021	Bashir Abdi (BEL)	2:13:44 Mx	2025	Sifan Hassan (NED)
North, Central America and Caribbean (records)	2:04:43	2025	Conner Mantz (USA)	2:18:29	2022	Emily Sisson (USA)
Oceania (records)	2:06:20	2026	Haftu Strintzos (AUS)	2:20:38	2026	Isobel Batt-Doyle (AUS)
South America (records)	2:04:51	2022	Daniel Ferreira do Nascimento (BRA)	2:24:18	2024	Florencia Borelli (ARG)

=== All-time top 25 ===
Tables show data for two definitions of "Top 25" - the top 25 marathon times and the top 25 athletes:
- denotes top performance for athletes in the top 25 marathon times
- denotes lesser performances, still in the top 25 marathon times, by repeat athletes
- denotes top performance (only) for other top 25 athletes who fall outside the top 25 marathon times

The data is correct as of 18 October 2026.

==== Men ====
Ath.#	Perf.#	Time	Athlete	Nation	Date	Place	Ref.
1	1	1:59:30	Sabastian Sawe	Kenya	26 April 2026	London	
2	2	1:59:41	Yomif Kejelcha	Ethiopia	26 April 2026	London	
3	3	2:00:28	Jacob Kiplimo	Uganda	26 April 2026	London	
4	4	2:00:35	Kelvin Kiptum	Kenya	8 October 2023	Chicago	
5	5	2:01:09	Eliud Kipchoge	Kenya	25 September 2022	Berlin	
5	5	2:01:09	Amos Kipruto	Kenya	11 October 2026	Chicago	
	7	2:01:25	Kiptum #2		23 April 2023	London	
	8	2:01:39	Kipchoge #2		16 September 2018	Berlin	
	8	2:01:39	A. Kipruto #2		26 April 2026	London	
7	10	2:01:41	Kenenisa Bekele	Ethiopia	29 September 2019	Berlin	
8	11	2:01:48	Sisay Lemma	Ethiopia	3 December 2023	Valencia	
	12	2:01:53	Kiptum #3		4 December 2022	Valencia	
	13	2:02:05	Sawe #2		1 December 2024	Valencia	
9	14	2:02:16	Benson Kipruto	Kenya	3 March 2024	Tokyo	
	14	2:02:16	Sawe #3		21 September 2025	Berlin	
	16	2:02:23	Kiplimo #2		12 October 2025	Chicago	
10	17	2:02:24	John Korir	Kenya	7 December 2025	Valencia	
	18	2:02:27	Sawe #4		27 April 2025	London	
	19	2:02:37	Kipchoge #3		28 April 2019	London	
11	20	2:02:38	Deresa Geleta	Ethiopia	1 December 2024	Valencia	
	21	2:02:40	Kipchoge #4		6 March 2022	Tokyo	
	22	2:02:42	Kipchoge #5		24 September 2023	Berlin	
	23	2:02:44	Korir #2		13 October 2024	Chicago	
12	24	2:02:48	Birhanu Legese	Ethiopia	29 September 2019	Berlin	
13	25	2:02:50	Guye Adola	Ethiopia	27 September 2026	Berlin	
14		2:02:55	Mosinet Geremew	Ethiopia	28 April 2019	London	
14		2:02:55	Timothy Kiplagat	Kenya	3 March 2024	Tokyo	
16		2:02:56	Tadese Takele	Ethiopia	11 October 2026	Chicago	
17		2:02:57	Dennis Kipruto Kimetto	Kenya	28 September 2014	Berlin	
18		2:02:59	Tamirat Tola	Ethiopia	26 April 2026	London	
19		2:03:00	Evans Chebet	Kenya	6 December 2020	Valencia	
19		2:03:00	Gabriel Geay	Tanzania	4 December 2022	Valencia	
21		2:03:04	Lawrence Cherono	Kenya	6 December 2020	Valencia	
22		2:03:11	Alexander Mutiso	Kenya	3 December 2023	Valencia	
23		2:03:13	Emmanuel Kipchirchir Mutai	Kenya	28 September 2014	Berlin	
23		2:03:13	Wilson Kipsang Kiprotich	Kenya	25 September 2016	Berlin	
23		2:03:13	Vincent Kipkemoi	Kenya	24 September 2023	Berlin	

Notes

- Eliud Kipchoge (Kenya) ran a time of 1:59:40.2 at the Ineos 1:59 Challenge in Vienna on 12 October 2019. This event was run with no other competitors and with the assistance of fuel and hydration on demand and in-out pacemakers. Therefore, the attempt was not eligible for official ratification. This was faster than his previous assisted run of 2:00:25 at the Nike Breaking2 in Monza on 6 May 2017, which was also ineligible.
- John Korir (Kenya) ran a time of 2:01:52 at the Boston Marathon on 20 April 2026 that was run on an assisted course (in the case of Boston, a point-to-point, net downhill course in excess of the standards) and is therefore ineligible for record purposes per World Athletics Competition Rule 31.21
- Titus Ekiru (Kenya) ran a time of 2:02:57 at the Milano City Marathon on 16 May 2021, but was later disqualified due to doping violations.
- Geoffrey Mutai (Kenya) ran a time of 2:03:02 at the Boston Marathon on 18 April 2011 that was run on an assisted course and is therefore ineligible for record purposes per IAAF rule 260.28
- Moses Mosop (Kenya) ran a time of 2:03:06 at the Boston Marathon on 18 April 2011 that was run on an assisted course and is therefore ineligible for record purposes per IAAF rule 260.28

==== Women ====
Ath.#	Perf.#	Time	Athlete	Nation	Date	Place	Ref.
1	1	2:09:56	Ruth Chepng'etich	Kenya	13 October 2024	Chicago	
2	2	2:10:51	Fotyen Tesfay	Ethiopia	15 March 2026	Barcelona	
3	3	2:11:04	Tigst Assefa	Ethiopia	27 September 2026	Berlin	
	4	2:11:53	Assefa #2		24 September 2023	Berlin	
4	5	2:13:33	Hawi Feysa	Ethiopia	11 October 2026	Chicago	
5	6	2:13:44	Sifan Hassan	Netherlands	8 October 2023	Chicago	
6	7	2:14:00	Joyciline Jepkosgei	Kenya	7 December 2025	Valencia	
7	8	2:14:04	Brigid Kosgei	Kenya	13 October 2019	Chicago	
8	9	2:14:07	Sharon Lokedi	Kenya	11 October 2026	Chicago	
	10	2:14:18	Chepng'etich #2		9 October 2022	Chicago	
	11	2:14:29	Kosgei #2		1 March 2026	Tokyo	
9	12	2:14:43	Peres Jepchirchir	Kenya	7 December 2025	Valencia	
	13	2:14:55	Kosgei #3		11 October 2026	Chicago	
	14	2:14:57	Feysa #2		12 October 2025	Chicago	
11	15	2:14:58	Amane Beriso Shankule	Ethiopia	4 December 2022	Valencia	
12	16	2:15:25	Paula Radcliffe	Great Britain	13 April 2003	London	
	17	2:15:37	Assefa #3		25 September 2022	Berlin	
	17	2:15:37	Chepng'etich #3		8 October 2023	Chicago	
	19	2:15:41 Wo	Assefa #4		26 April 2026	London	
	20	2:15:50 Wo	Assefa #5		27 April 2025	London	
12	21	2:15:51	Worknesh Degefa	Ethiopia	3 December 2023	Valencia	
13	22	2:15:53 Wo	Hellen Obiri	Kenya	26 April 2026	London	
14	23	2:15:55	Sutume Kebede	Ethiopia	3 March 2024	Tokyo	
	24	2:15:55 Wo	Jepkosgei #2		26 April 2026	London	
	25	2:16:02	Kosgei #4		6 March 2022	Tokyo	
15		2:16:07	Tigist Ketema	Ethiopia	7 January 2024	Dubai	
16		2:16:12	Buze Diriba	Ethiopia	18 October 2026	Amsterdam	
17		2:16:14	Rosemary Wanjiru	Kenya	3 March 2024	Tokyo	
18		2:16:22	Almaz Ayana	Ethiopia	3 December 2023	Valencia	
19		2:16:34 Wo	Alemu Megertu	Ethiopia	21 April 2024	London	
20		2:16:36	Bertukan Welde	Ethiopia	1 March 2026	Tokyo	
21		2:16:49	Letesenbet Gidey	Ethiopia	4 December 2022	Valencia	
22		2:16:52	Yalemzerf Yehualaw	Ethiopia	20 October 2024	Amsterdam	
23		2:16:53	Bedatu Hirpa	Ethiopia	27 September 2026	Berlin	
24		2:16:55	Dera Dida	Ethiopia	27 September 2026	Berlin	
25		2:16:56	Winfridah Moraa Moseti	Kenya	2 March 2025	Tokyo	

Notes

- Tsehay Gemechu (Ethiopia) ran a time of 2:16:56 at the Tokyo Marathon on 5 March 2023. She received a four-year ban in October 2024, backdated to the provisional suspension issued in November 2023, for an anti-doping rule violation indicated by abnormalities in her Athlete Biological Passport. All her results from March 2020 onwards were disqualified.

=== World leading times ===
==== Men ====
Year	Time	Athlete	Place
2000	2:06:36	António Pinto (POR)	London
2001	2:06:50	Josephat Kiprono (KEN)	Rotterdam
2002	2:05:38	Khalid Khannouchi (USA)	London
2003	2:04:55	Paul Tergat (KEN)	Berlin
2004	2:06:14	Felix Limo (KEN)	Rotterdam
2005	2:06:20	Haile Gebrselassie (ETH)	Amsterdam
2006	2:05:56	Haile Gebrselassie (ETH)	Berlin
2007	2:04:26	Haile Gebrselassie (ETH)	Berlin
2008	2:03:59	Haile Gebrselassie (ETH)	Berlin
2009	2:04:27	Duncan Kibet (KEN)	Rotterdam
2009	2:04:27	James Kwambai (KEN)	Rotterdam
2010	2:04:48	Patrick Makau Musyoki (KEN)	Rotterdam
2011	2:03:38	Patrick Makau Musyoki (KEN)	Berlin
2012	2:04:15	Geoffrey Mutai (KEN)	Berlin
2013	2:03:23	Wilson Kipsang Kiprotich (KEN)	Berlin
2014	2:02:57	Dennis Kimetto (KEN)	Berlin
2015	2:04:00	Eliud Kipchoge (KEN)	Berlin
2016	2:03:03	Kenenisa Bekele (ETH)	Berlin
2017	2:03:32	Eliud Kipchoge (KEN)	Berlin
2018	2:01:39	Eliud Kipchoge (KEN)	Berlin
2019	2:01:41	Kenenisa Bekele (ETH)	Berlin
2020	2:03:00	Evans Chebet (KEN)	Valencia
2021	2:03:36	Bashir Abdi (BEL)	Rotterdam
2022	2:01:09	Eliud Kipchoge (KEN)	Berlin
2023	2:00:35	Kelvin Kiptum (KEN)	Chicago
2024	2:02:05	Sabastian Sawe (KEN)	Valencia
2025	2:02:16	Sabastian Sawe (KEN)	Berlin
2026	1:59:30	Sabastian Sawe (KEN)	London

==== Women ====
Year	Time	Athlete	Place
2000	2:21:33	Catherine Ndereba (KEN)	Chicago
2001	2:18:47	Catherine Ndereba (KEN)	Chicago
2002	2:17:18	Paula Radcliffe (GBR)	Chicago
2003	2:15:25	Paula Radcliffe (GBR)	London
2004	2:19:41	Yoko Shibui (JPN)	Berlin
2005	2:17:42	Paula Radcliffe (GBR)	London
2006	2:19:36	Deena Kastor (USA)	London
2007	2:20:38	Zhou Chunxiu (CHN)	London
2008	2:19:19	Irina Mikitenko (GER)	Berlin
2009	2:22:11	Irina Mikitenko (GER)	London
2010	2:22:04	Atsede Bayisa (ETH)	Paris
2011	2:19:19	Mary Jepkosgei Keitany (KEN)	London
2012	2:18:37	Mary Jepkosgei Keitany (KEN)	London
2013	2:19:57	Rita Jeptoo (KEN)	Chicago
2014	2:20:18	Tirfi Tsegaye (ETH)	Berlin
2015	2:19:25	Gladys Cherono Kiprono (KEN)	Berlin
2016	2:19:41	Tirfi Tsegaye (ETH)	Berlin
2017	2:17:01	Mary Jepkosgei Keitany (KEN)	Dubai
2018	2:18:11	Gladys Cherono Kiprono (KEN)	Berlin
2019	2:14:04	Brigid Kosgei (KEN)	Chicago
2020	2:17:16	Peres Jepchirchir (KEN)	Valencia
2021	2:17:43	Joyciline Jepkosgei (KEN)	London
2022	2:14:18	Ruth Chepng'etich (KEN)	Chicago
2023	2:11:53	Tigst Assefa (ETH)	Berlin
2024	2:09:56	Ruth Chepng'etich (KEN)	Chicago
2025	2:14:00	Joyciline Jepkosgei (KEN)	Valencia
2026	2:10:51	Fotyen Tesfay (ETH)	Barcelona

=== Oldest marathoner ===
Fauja Singh, then 100, finished the Toronto Waterfront Marathon, becoming the first centenarian ever to officially complete that distance. Singh, a British citizen, finished the race on 16 October 2011 with a time of 8:11:05.9, making him the oldest marathoner. Because Singh could not produce a birth certificate from rural 1911 Colonial India, the place of his birth, his age could not be verified and his record was not accepted by the official governing body World Masters Athletics.

Johnny Kelley ran his last full Boston Marathon at the documented age of 84 in 1992. He previously had won the Boston Marathon in 1935 and 1945. Between 1934 and 1950, Johnny finished in the top five 15 times, consistently running in the 2:30s and finishing in second place a record seven times at Boston. A fixture at Boston for more than a half century, his 1992 61st start and 58th finish in Boston is a record which still stands today.

Gladys Burrill, a 92-year-old Prospect, Oregon woman and part-time resident of Hawaii, previously held the Guinness World Records title of oldest person to complete a marathon with her 9 hours 53 minutes performance at the 2010 Honolulu Marathon. The records of the Association of Road Racing Statisticians, at that time, however, suggested that Singh was overall the oldest marathoner, completing the 2004 London Marathon at the age of 93 years and 17 days, and that Burrill was the oldest female marathoner, completing the 2010 Honolulu Marathon at the age of 92 years and 19 days. Singh's age was also reported to be 93 by other sources.

In 2015, 92-year-old Harriette Thompson of Charlotte, North Carolina, completed the Rock 'n' Roll San Diego Marathon in 7 hours 24 minutes 36 seconds, thus becoming the oldest woman to complete a marathon. While Gladys Burrill was 92 years and 19 days old when she completed her record-setting marathon, Harriette Thompson was 92 years and 65 days old when she completed hers.

English born Canadian Ed Whitlock is the oldest to complete a marathon in under 3 hours at age 74, and under 4 hours at age 85.

=== Youngest marathoner ===
Budhia Singh, a boy from Odisha, India, completed his first marathon at age five. He trained under the coach Biranchi Das, who saw potential in him. In May 2006, Budhia was temporarily banned from running by the ministers of child welfare, as his life could be at risk. His coach was also arrested for exploiting and cruelty to a child and was later murdered in an unrelated incident. Budhia is now at a state-run sports academy.

The youngest under 4 hours is Mary Etta Boitano at age 7 years, 284 days; under 3 hours Julie Mullin at 10 years 180 days; and under 2:50 Carrie Garritson at 11 years 116 days.

=== Participation ===
In 2016, Running USA estimated that there were approximately 507,600 marathon finishers in the United States, while other sources reported greater than 550,000 finishers. The chart below from Running USA provides the estimated U.S. Marathon Finisher totals going back to 1976.

Marathon running has become an obsession in China, with 22 marathon races in 2011 increasing to 400 in 2017. In 2015, 75 Chinese runners participated in the Boston Marathon and this increased to 278 in 2017.

=== Multiple marathons ===
As marathon running has become more popular, some athletes have undertaken challenges involving running a series of marathons.

The 100 Marathon Club is intended to provide a focal point for all runners, particularly from the United Kingdom or Ireland, who have completed 100 or more races of marathon distance or longer. At least 10 of these events must be United Kingdom or Ireland Road Marathons. Club chairman Roger Biggs has run more than 700 marathons or ultras. Brian Mills completed his 800th marathon on 17 September 2011.

Steve Edwards, a member of the 100 Marathon Club, set the world record for running 500 marathons in the fastest average finish time of 3 hours 15 minutes, at the same time becoming the first man to run 500 marathons with an official time below 3 hours 30 minutes, on 11 November 2012 at Milton Keynes, England. The records took 24 years to achieve. Edwards was 49 at the time.

Over 350 individuals have completed a marathon in each state of the United States plus Washington, D.C., and some have done it as many as eight times. Beverly Paquin, a 22-year-old nurse from Iowa, was the youngest woman to run a marathon in all 50 states in 2010. A few weeks later, still in 2010, Morgan Cummings (also 22) became the youngest woman to complete a marathon in all 50 states and DC. In 2004, Chuck Bryant of Miami, Florida, who lost his right leg below the knee, became the first amputee to finish this circuit. Bryant has completed a total of 59 marathons on his prosthesis. Twenty-seven people have run a marathon on each of the seven continents, and 31 people have run a marathon in each of the Canadian provinces. In 1980, in what was termed the Marathon of Hope, Terry Fox, who had lost a leg to cancer and so ran with one artificial leg, attained 5,373 km (3,339 mi) of his proposed cross-Canada cancer fundraising run, maintaining an average of over 37 km (23 mi), close to the planned marathon distance, for each of 143 consecutive days.

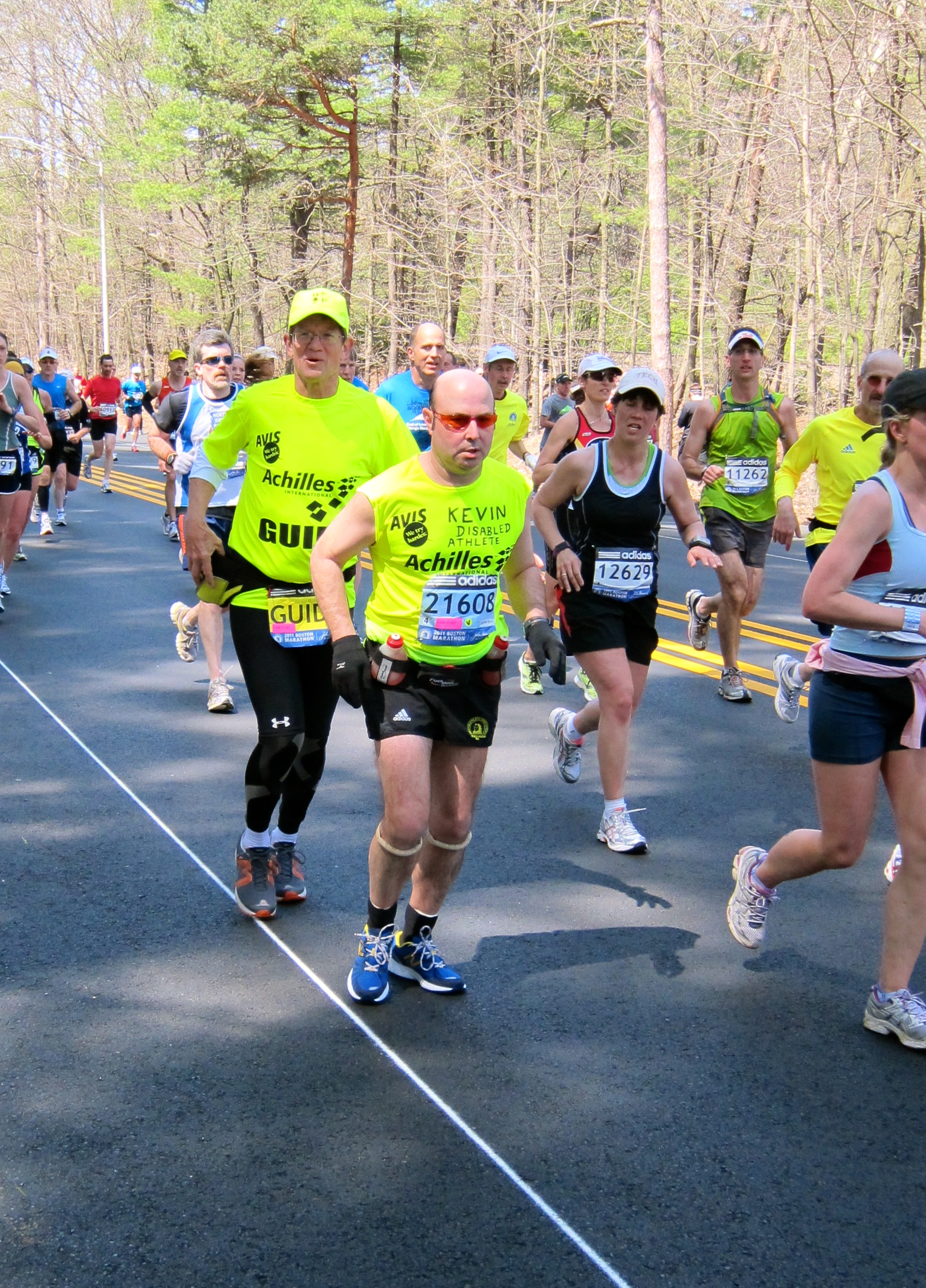
Kevin Counihan (right), of the Achilles Track Club, with his guide, running the 2011 Boston Marathon. He completed his 150th marathon at Boston in April 2014.

On 25 September 2011, Patrick Finney of Grapevine, Texas became the first person with multiple sclerosis to finish a marathon in each state of the United States. In 2004, "the disease had left him unable to walk. But unwilling to endure a life of infirmity, Finney managed to regain his ability to balance on two feet, to walk – and eventually to run – through extensive rehabilitation therapy and new medications."

In 2003, British adventurer Sir Ranulph Fiennes completed seven marathons on seven continents in seven days. He completed this feat despite suffering from a heart attack and undergoing a double heart bypass operation just four months before. This feat has since been eclipsed by Irish ultramarathon runner Richard Donovan who in 2009 completed seven marathons on seven continents in under 132 hours (five and a half days). Starting 1 February 2012 he improved on this by completing the 7 on 7 in under 120 hours or in less than five days.

On 30 November 2013, 69-year-old Larry Macon set a Guinness World Record for Most Marathons Run in a Year by Man by running 238 marathons. Larry Macon celebrated his 1,000th career marathon at the Cowtown Marathon in Ft. Worth on 24 February 2013.

Other goals are to attempt to run marathons on a series of consecutive weekends (Richard Worley on 159 weekends), or to run the most marathons during a particular year or the most in a lifetime. A pioneer in running multiple marathons was Sy Mah of Toledo, Ohio, who ran 524 before he died in 1988. As of 30 June 2007, Horst Preisler of Germany had successfully completed 1214 marathons plus 347 ultramarathons, a total of 1561 events at marathon distance or longer. Sigrid Eichner, Christian Hottas and Hans-Joachim Meyer have also all completed over 1000 marathons each. Norm Frank of the United States is credited with 945 marathons.

Christian Hottas is meanwhile the first runner who ever completed 2000 marathons. He ran his 2000th at TUI Marathon Hannover on 5 May 2013 together with a group of more than 80 friends from 11 countries, including 8 officers from the 100 Marathons Clubs U.K., North-America, Germany, Denmark, Austria and Italy. Hottas completed his 2500th marathon on 4 December 2016.

In 2010, Stefaan Engels, a Belgian, set out to run the marathon distance every day of the year. Because of a foot injury he had to resort to a handcycle near the end of January 2010. However, on 5 February he was fully recovered and decided to reset the counter back to zero. By 30 March he broke the existing record of Akinori Kusuda, from Japan, who completed 52 marathons in a row in 2009. On 5 February 2011, Engels had run 365 marathon distances in as many days. Ricardo Abad Martínez, from Spain, later ran 150 marathons in 150 consecutive days in 2009, and subsequently 500 marathons in a row, from October 2010 to February 2012.

In 2024, Belgian Hilde Dosogne ran a marathon every day of the year. On 31 December, the 55-year-old ran her 366th and last marathon, a record for a woman (accounting for 15,445 kilometres, 22 pairs of shoes and 15 falls).

Some runners compete to run the same marathons for the most consecutive years. For example, Johnny Kelley completed 58 Boston Marathons (he entered the race 61 times). Currently, the longest consecutive streak of Boston Marathon finishes—45 in a row—is held by Bennett Beach, of Bethesda, Maryland.

== Olympic medalists ==
=== Men ===
Games	Gold		Silver		Bronze	
1896 Athens	Spyridon Louis; Greece	2:58:50	Charilaos Vasilakos; Greece	3:06:03	Gyula Kellner; Hungary	3:06:35
1900 Paris	Michel Théato; France	2:59:45	Émile Champion; France	3:04:17	Ernst Fast; Sweden	3:37:14
1904 St. Louis	Thomas Hicks; United States	3:28:53	Albert Corey; United States	3:34:52	Arthur Newton; United States	3:47:33
1908 London	Johnny Hayes; United States	2:55:18.4	Charles Hefferon; South Africa	2:56:06.0	Joseph Forshaw; United States	2:57:10.4
1912 Stockholm	Ken McArthur; South Africa	2:36:54.8	Christian Gitsham; South Africa	2:37:52.0	Gaston Strobino; United States	2:38:42.4
1920 Antwerp	Hannes Kolehmainen; Finland	2:32:35.8	Jüri Lossmann; Estonia	2:32:48.6	Valerio Arri; Italy	2:36:32.8
1924 Paris	Albin Stenroos; Finland	2:41:22.6	Romeo Bertini; Italy	2:47:19.6	Clarence DeMar; United States	2:48:14.0
1928 Amsterdam	Boughera El Ouafi; France	2:32:57	Manuel Plaza; Chile	2:33:23	Martti Marttelin; Finland	2:35:02
1932 Los Angeles	Juan Carlos Zabala; Argentina	2:31:36	Sam Ferris; Great Britain	2:31:55	Armas Toivonen; Finland	2:32:12
1936 Berlin	Sohn Kee-chung; Japan	2:29:19.2	Ernest Harper; Great Britain	2:31:23.2	Nam Sung-yong; Japan	2:31:42.0
1948 London	Delfo Cabrera; Argentina	2:34:51.6	Tom Richards; Great Britain	2:35:07.6	Étienne Gailly; Belgium	2:35:33.6
1952 Helsinki	Emil Zátopek; Czechoslovakia	2:23:03.2	Reinaldo Gorno; Argentina	2:25:35.0	Gustaf Jansson; Sweden	2:26:07.0
1956 Melbourne	Alain Mimoun; France	2:25:00	Franjo Mihalić; Yugoslavia	2:26:32	Veikko Karvonen; Finland	2:27:47
1960 Rome	Abebe Bikila; Ethiopia	2:15:16.2	Rhadi Ben Abdesselam; Morocco	2:15:41.6	Barry Magee; New Zealand	2:17:18.2
1964 Tokyo	Abebe Bikila; Ethiopia	2:12:11.2	Basil Heatley; Great Britain	2:16:19.2	Kōkichi Tsuburaya; Japan	2:16:22.8
1968 Mexico City	Mamo Wolde; Ethiopia	2:20:26	Kenji Kimihara; Japan	2:23:31	Mike Ryan; New Zealand	2:23:45
1972 Munich	Frank Shorter; United States	2:12:19	Karel Lismont; Belgium	2:14:31	Mamo Wolde; Ethiopia	2:15:08
1976 Montreal	Waldemar Cierpinski; East Germany	2:09:55	Frank Shorter; United States	2:10:45	Karel Lismont; Belgium	2:11:12
1980 Moscow	Waldemar Cierpinski; East Germany	2:11:03	Gerard Nijboer; Netherlands	2:11:20	Satymkul Dzhumanazarov; Soviet Union	2:11:35
1984 Los Angeles	Carlos Lopes; Portugal	2:09:21	John Treacy; Ireland	2:09:56	Charlie Spedding; Great Britain	2:09:58
1988 Seoul	Gelindo Bordin; Italy	2:10:32	Douglas Wakiihuri; Kenya	2:10:47	Ahmed Salah; Djibouti	2:10:59
1992 Barcelona	Hwang Young-cho; South Korea	2:13:23	Kōichi Morishita; Japan	2:13:45	Stephan Freigang; Germany	2:14:00
1996 Atlanta	Josia Thugwane; South Africa	2:12:36	Lee Bong-ju; South Korea	2:12:39	Erick Wainaina; Kenya	2:12:44
2000 Sydney	Gezahegne Abera; Ethiopia	2:10:11	Erick Wainaina; Kenya	2:10:31	Tesfaye Tola; Ethiopia	2:11:10
2004 Athens	Stefano Baldini; Italy	2:10:55	Meb Keflezighi; United States	2:11:29	Vanderlei de Lima; Brazil	2:12:11
2008 Beijing	Samuel Wanjiru; Kenya	2:06:32	Jaouad Gharib; Morocco	2:07:16	Tsegay Kebede; Ethiopia	2:10:00
2012 London	Stephen Kiprotich; Uganda	2:08:01	Abel Kirui; Kenya	2:08:27	Wilson Kipsang Kiprotich; Kenya	2:09:37
2016 Rio de Janeiro	Eliud Kipchoge; Kenya	2:08:44	Feyisa Lelisa; Ethiopia	2:09:54	Galen Rupp; United States	2:10:05
2020 Tokyo	Eliud Kipchoge; Kenya	2:08:38	Abdi Nageeye; Netherlands	2:09:58	Bashir Abdi; Belgium	2:10:00
2024 Paris	Tamirat Tola; Ethiopia	2:06:26	Bashir Abdi; Belgium	2:06:47	Benson Kipruto; Kenya	2:07:00
2028 Los Angeles						

=== Women ===
Games	Gold		Silver		Bronze	
1984 Los Angeles	Joan Benoit; United States	2:24:52	Grete Waitz; Norway	2:26:18	Rosa Mota; Portugal	2:26:57
1988 Seoul	Rosa Mota; Portugal	2:25:40	Lisa Martin; Australia	2:25:53	Katrin Dörre; East Germany	2:26:21
1992 Barcelona	Valentina Yegorova; Unified Team	2:32:41	Yuko Arimori; Japan	2:32:49	Lorraine Moller; New Zealand	2:33:59
1996 Atlanta	Fatuma Roba; Ethiopia	2:26:05	Valentina Yegorova; Russia	2:28:05	Yuko Arimori; Japan	2:28:39
2000 Sydney	Naoko Takahashi; Japan	2:23:14	Lidia Șimon; Romania	2:23:22	Joyce Chepchumba; Kenya	2:24:45
2004 Athens	Mizuki Noguchi; Japan	2:26:20	Catherine Ndereba; Kenya	2:26:32	Deena Kastor; United States	2:27:20
2008 Beijing	Constantina Tomescu; Romania	2:26:44	Catherine Ndereba; Kenya	2:27:06	Zhou Chunxiu; China	2:27:07
2012 London	Tiki Gelana; Ethiopia	2:23:07	Priscah Jeptoo; Kenya	2:23:12	Tatyana Petrova Arkhipova; Russia	2:23:29
2016 Rio de Janeiro	Jemima Sumgong; Kenya	2:24:04	Eunice Kirwa; Bahrain	2:24:13	Mare Dibaba; Ethiopia	2:24:30
2020 Tokyo	Peres Jepchirchir; Kenya	2:27:20	Brigid Kosgei; Kenya	2:27:36	Molly Seidel; United States	2:27:46
2024 Paris	Sifan Hassan; Netherlands	2:22:55	Tigst Assefa; Ethiopia	2:22:58	Hellen Obiri; Kenya	2:23:10
2028 Los Angeles						

== World Championship medalists ==
=== Men ===
Championships	Gold	Silver	Bronze
1983 Helsinki	Robert de Castella (AUS)	Kebede Balcha (ETH)	Waldemar Cierpinski (GDR)
1987 Rome	Douglas Wakiihuri (KEN)	Hussein Ahmed Salah (DJI)	Gelindo Bordin (ITA)
1991 Tokyo	Hiromi Taniguchi (JPN)	Hussein Ahmed Salah (DJI)	Steve Spence (USA)
1993 Stuttgart	Mark Plaatjes (USA)	Luketz Swartbooi (NAM)	Bert van Vlaanderen (NED)
1995 Gothenburg	Martín Fiz (ESP)	Dionicio Cerón (MEX)	Luíz Antônio dos Santos (BRA)
1997 Athens	Abel Antón (ESP)	Martín Fiz (ESP)	Steve Moneghetti (AUS)
1999 Seville	Abel Antón (ESP)	Vincenzo Modica (ITA)	Nobuyuki Sato (JPN)
2001 Edmonton	Gezahegne Abera (ETH)	Simon Biwott (KEN)	Stefano Baldini (ITA)
2003 Saint-Denis	Jaouad Gharib (MAR)	Julio Rey (ESP)	Stefano Baldini (ITA)
2005 Helsinki	Jaouad Gharib (MAR)	Christopher Isengwe (TAN)	Tsuyoshi Ogata (JPN)
2007 Osaka	Luke Kibet Bowen (KEN)	Mubarak Hassan Shami (QAT)	Viktor Röthlin (SUI)
2009 Berlin	Abel Kirui (KEN)	Emmanuel Kipchirchir Mutai (KEN)	Tsegaye Kebede (ETH)
2011 Daegu	Abel Kirui (KEN)	Vincent Kipruto (KEN)	Feyisa Lilesa (ETH)
2013 Moscow	Stephen Kiprotich (UGA)	Lelisa Desisa (ETH)	Tadese Tola (ETH)
2015 Beijing	Ghirmay Ghebreslassie (ERI)	Yemane Tsegay (ETH)	Solomon Mutai (UGA)
2017 London	Geoffrey Kirui (KEN)	Tamirat Tola (ETH)	Alphonce Simbu (TAN)
2019 Doha	Lelisa Desisa (ETH)	Mosinet Geremew (ETH)	Amos Kipruto (KEN)
2022 Eugene	Tamirat Tola (ETH)	Mosinet Geremew (ETH)	Bashir Abdi (BEL)
2023 Budapest	Victor Kiplangat (UGA)	Maru Teferi (ISR)	Leul Gebresilase (ETH)
2025 Tokyo	Alphonce Simbu (TAN)	Amanal Petros (GER)	Iliass Aouani (ITA)

=== Women ===
Championships	Gold	Silver	Bronze
1983 Helsinki	Grete Waitz (NOR)	Marianne Dickerson (USA)	Raisa Smekhnova (URS)
1987 Rome	Rosa Mota (POR)	Zoya Ivanova (URS)	Jocelyne Villeton (FRA)
1991 Tokyo	Wanda Panfil (POL)	Sachiko Yamashita (JPN)	Katrin Dörre (GER)
1993 Stuttgart	Junko Asari (JPN)	Manuela Machado (POR)	Tomoe Abe (JPN)
1995 Gothenburg	Manuela Machado (POR)	Anuța Cătună (ROU)	Ornella Ferrara (ITA)
1997 Athens	Hiromi Suzuki (JPN)	Manuela Machado (POR)	Lidia Slăvuțeanu (ROU)
1999 Seville	Jong Song-ok (PRK)	Ari Ichihashi (JPN)	Lidia Șimon (ROU)
2001 Edmonton	Lidia Șimon (ROU)	Reiko Tosa (JPN)	Svetlana Zakharova (RUS)
2003 Saint-Denis	Catherine Ndereba (KEN)	Mizuki Noguchi (JPN)	Masako Chiba (JPN)
2005 Helsinki	Paula Radcliffe (GBR)	Catherine Ndereba (KEN)	Constantina Diţă-Tomescu (ROU)
2007 Osaka	Catherine Ndereba (KEN)	Zhou Chunxiu (CHN)	Reiko Tosa (JPN)
2009 Berlin	Bai Xue (CHN)	Yoshimi Ozaki (JPN)	Aselefech Mergia (ETH)
2011 Daegu	Edna Kiplagat (KEN)	Priscah Jeptoo (KEN)	Sharon Cherop (KEN)
2013 Moscow	Edna Kiplagat (KEN)	Valeria Straneo (ITA)	Kayoko Fukushi (JPN)
2015 Beijing	Mare Dibaba (ETH)	Helah Kiprop (KEN)	Eunice Kirwa (BHR)
2017 London	Rose Chelimo (BHR)	Edna Kiplagat (KEN)	Amy Cragg (USA)
2019 Doha	Ruth Chepng'etich (KEN)	Rose Chelimo (BHR)	Helalia Johannes (NAM)
2022 Eugene	Gotytom Gebreslase (ETH)	Judith Korir (KEN)	Lonah Chemtai Salpeter (ISR)
2023 Budapest	Amane Beriso Shankule (ETH)	Gotytom Gebreslase (ETH)	Fatima Ezzahra Gardadi (MAR)
2025 Tokyo	Peres Jepchirchir (KEN)	Tigst Assefa (ETH)	Julia Paternain (URU)

== General participation ==
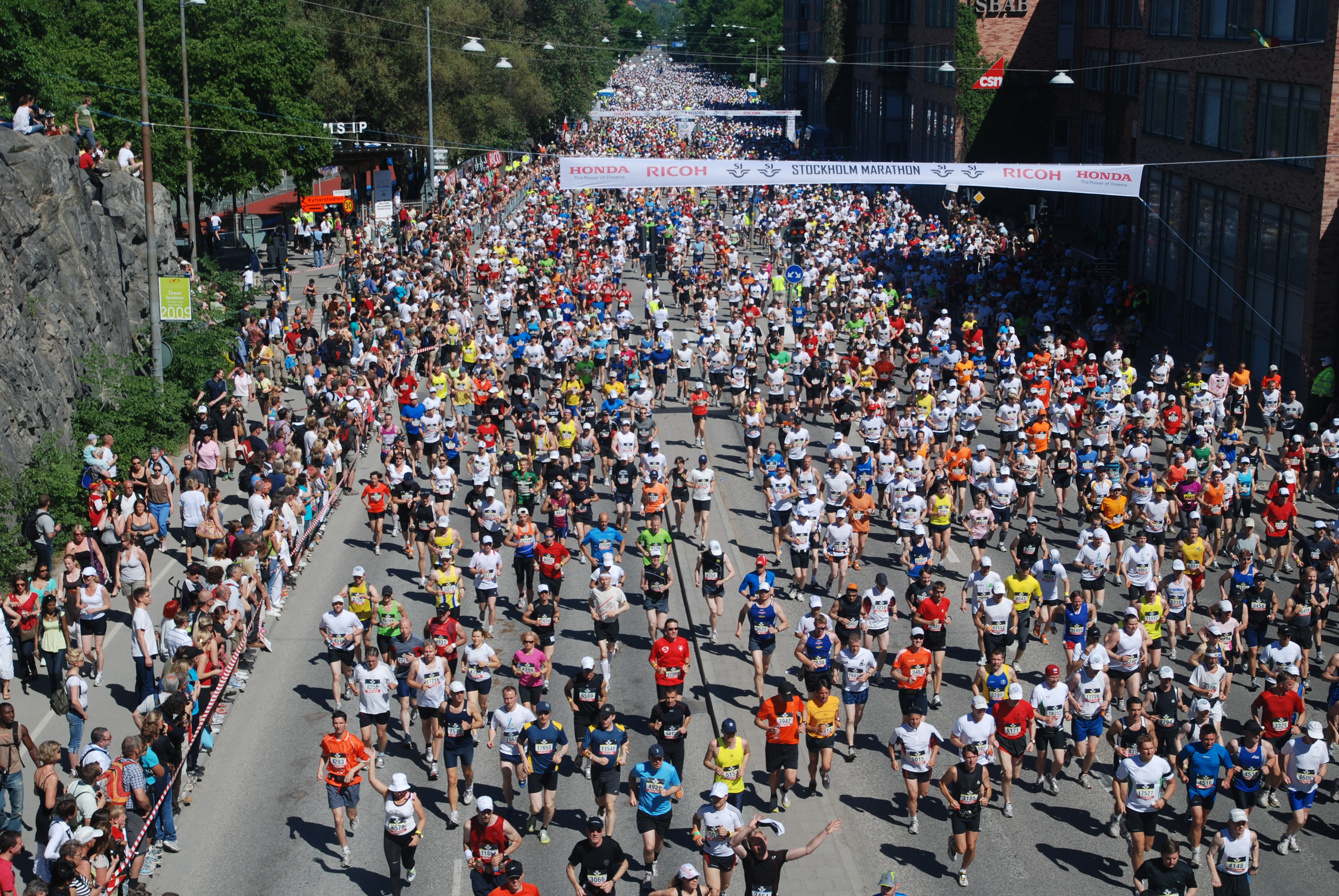
Start of the 2009 Stockholm Marathon

Most participants do not run a marathon to win. More important for most runners is their personal finishing time and their placement within their specific gender and age group, though some runners just want to finish. Strategies for completing a marathon include running the whole distance and a run–walk strategy. In 2005, the average marathon time in the U.S. was 4 hours 32 minutes 8 seconds for men, 5 hours 6 minutes 8 seconds for women. In 2015, the men's and women's median marathon times were 4 hours 20 minutes 13 seconds and 4 hours 45 minutes 30 seconds respectively.

A goal many runners aim for is to break certain time barriers. For example, recreational first-timers often try to run the marathon under four hours; more competitive runners may attempt to finish under three hours. Other benchmarks are the qualifying times for major marathons. The Boston Marathon, the oldest marathon in the United States, requires a qualifying time for all non-professional runners. The New York City Marathon also requires a qualifying time for guaranteed entry, at a significantly faster pace than Boston's.

Typically, there is a maximum allowed time of about six hours after which the marathon route is closed, although some larger marathons keep the course open considerably longer (eight hours or more). Many marathons around the world have such time limits by which all runners must have crossed the finish line. Anyone slower than the limit will be picked up by a sweeper bus. In many cases the marathon organizers are required to reopen the roads to the public so that traffic can return to normal.

With the growth in popularity of marathon-running, many marathons across the United States and the world have been filling to capacity faster than ever before. When the Boston Marathon opened up registration for its 2011 running, the field capacity was filled within eight hours.

=== Training ===
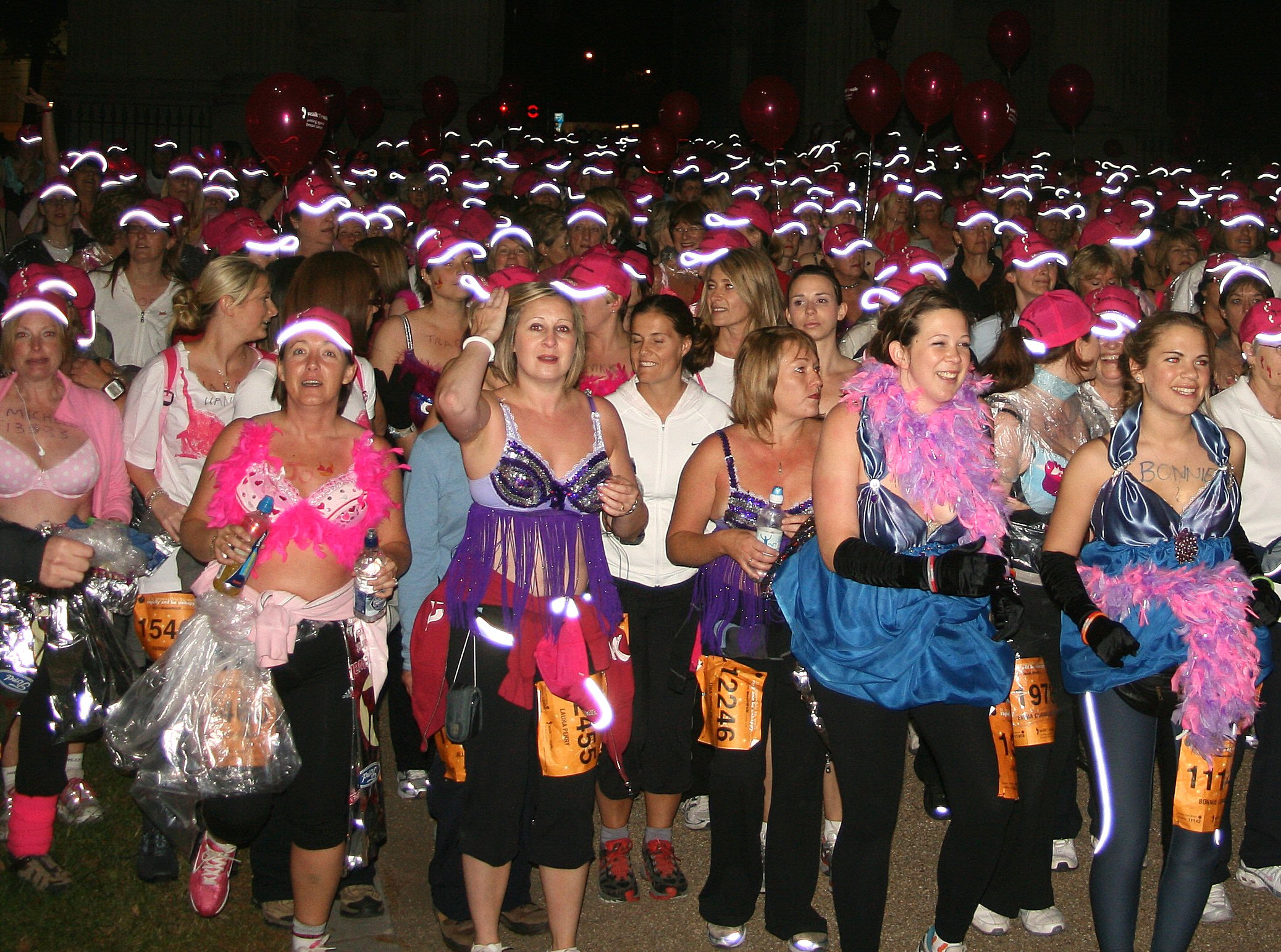
MoonWalk is a nocturnal charity marathon to raise money for breast cancer research.

The long run is an important element in marathon training. Recreational runners commonly try to reach a maximum of about 32 km (20 mi) in their longest weekly run and a total of about 64 km (40 mi) a week when training for the marathon, but wide variability exists in practice and in recommendations. More experienced marathoners may run a longer distance during the week. Greater weekly training mileages can offer greater results in terms of distance and endurance, but also carry a greater risk of training injury. Most male elite marathon runners will complete weekly distances of over 160 km (100 mi). It is recommended that those new to running should get a checkup from their doctor, as there are certain warning signs and risk factors that should be evaluated before undertaking any new workout program, especially marathon training.

Many training programs last a minimum of five or six months, with a gradual increase in the distance run and finally, for recovery, a period of tapering in the one to three weeks preceding the race. For beginners wishing to merely finish a marathon, a minimum of four months of running four days a week is recommended. Many trainers recommend a weekly increase in mileage of no more than 10%. It is also often advised to maintain a consistent running program for six weeks or so before beginning a marathon training program, to allow the body to adapt to the new stresses. The marathon training program itself would suppose variation between hard and easy training, with a periodization of the general plan.

Training programs can be found at the websites of Runner's World, Hal Higdon, Jeff Galloway, and the Boston Athletic Association, and in numerous other published sources, including the websites of specific marathons.

The last long training run might be undertaken up to two weeks prior to the event. Many marathon runners also "carbo-load" (increase carbohydrate intake while holding total caloric intake constant) during the week before the marathon to allow their bodies to store more glycogen.

=== Recovery ===
Successful recovery is an essential part of training for a marathon. It allows the body to heal and adapt. A lack of recovery can lead to overtraining, reduced performing, fatigue and injury. There are many different forms of recovery with some being more active and some more passive.

The most rapid form of recovery is the immediate active recovery which occurs during exercise between acts of exertion. In running this recovery phase is immediately after the completion of a running step when the lead foot is securely placed, impact is safely absorbed and there is a quick regaining of balance and energy before the next step is begun. These small, brief acts of recovery during a runner’s gait cycle allow them to run for longer while reducing the chances of fatigue.

Short term active recovery is whereby harder training sessions are interspersed with easier general exercise activities, typically on different days. For example, a leisurely swim between two 15 mile runs. The easier activity should be low intensity so that there is limited strain on the body but the increased blood flow helps to clear lactic acid and alleviate muscle soreness.

Long term recovery is based largely on the factors of sleep and nutrition. In regard to sleep, the total amount of sleep time an athlete gets plays a key role in their training performance. A lack of sleep can mean slower times and an increased risk of injury. According to sports scientist, Prof. John Brewer, 'sleep is as much a part of a marathon runner's preparation and training as a long run, and without the restorative effects of sleep it would be impossible to complete the 26.2 miles.' For marathon runners, a minimum of eight hours of good quality sleep a night is recommended. It is generally accepted, however, that the night before a race an athlete’s sleep time may be reduced due to a sense of anticipation.

Nutrition for a marathon training programme is primarily based around achieving the right balance of protein, carbohydrates and fats. A high protein diet should be eaten in order for the body to heal from the stresses of training. The rate of protein consumption should be significantly higher than for a non-athlete but does not need to be as high as for power trained athletes such as sprinters. The American College of Sports Medicine recommends between 1.2 to 2 grams per kg of bodyweight daily for athletes, with endurance athletes being at the lower end of the scale. Carbohydrate is widely considered to be an especially important source of energy for endurance training needs and marathon runners may load up on it one or two days prior to a race in order to boost their energy levels for it.

=== Glycogen and "the wall" ===
Carbohydrates that a person eats are converted by the liver and muscles into glycogen for storage. Glycogen burns rapidly to provide quick energy. Runners can store about 8 MJ or 2,000 kcal worth of glycogen in their bodies, enough for about 30 km/18–20 miles of running. Many runners report that running becomes noticeably more difficult at that point. When glycogen runs low, the body must then obtain energy by burning stored fat, which does not burn as readily. When this happens, the runner will experience dramatic fatigue and is said to "hit the wall". The aim of training for the marathon, according to many coaches, is to maximize the limited glycogen available so that the fatigue of the "wall" is not as dramatic. This is accomplished in part by utilizing a higher percentage of energy from burned fat even during the early phase of the race, thus conserving glycogen.

Carbohydrate-based "energy gels" are used by runners to avoid or reduce the effect of "hitting the wall", as they provide easy to digest energy during the run. Energy gels usually contain varying amounts of sodium and potassium and some also contain caffeine. They need to be consumed with a certain amount of water. Recommendations for how often to take an energy gel during the race range widely.

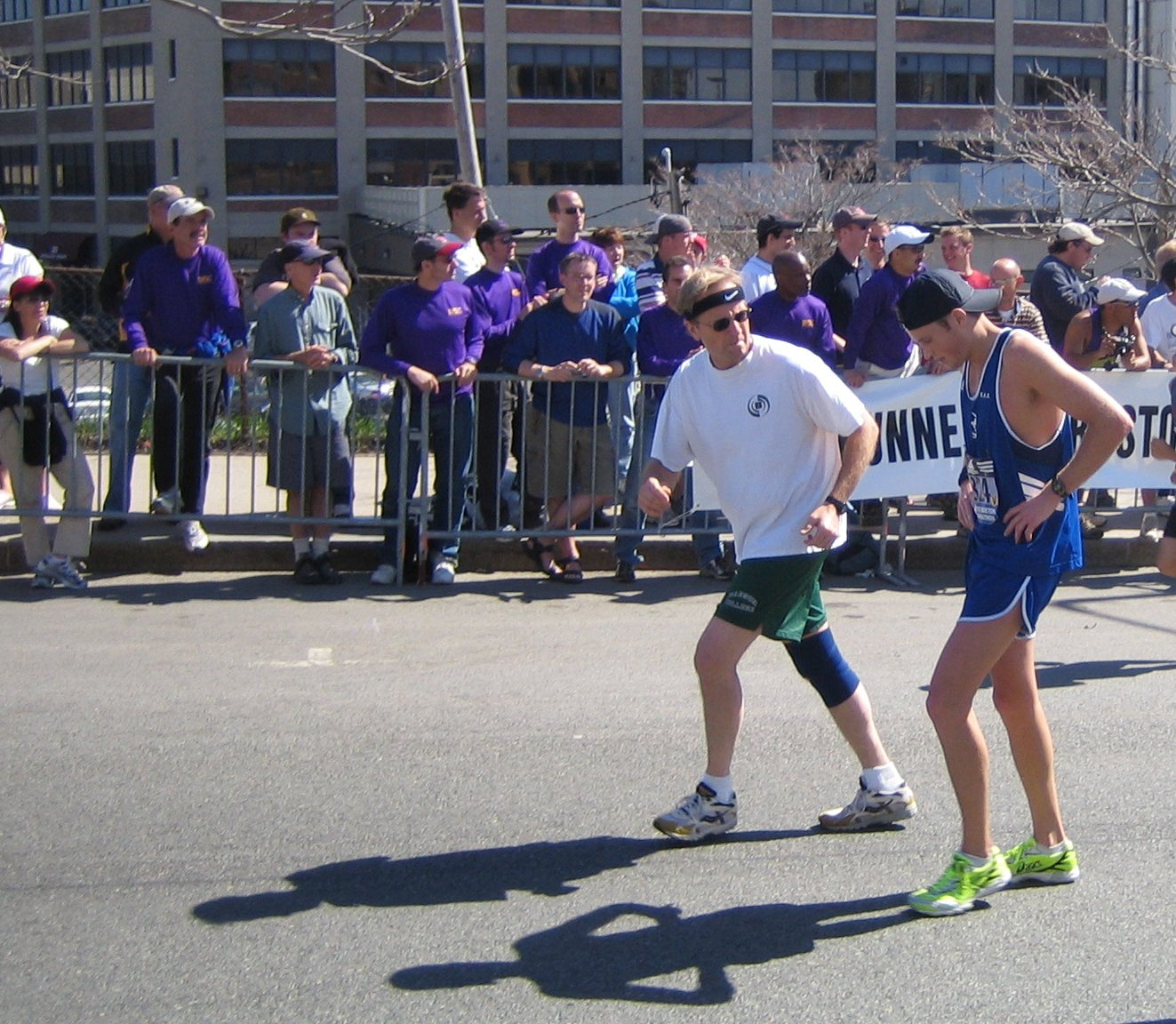
A runner getting encouragement at Mile 25 of the Boston Marathon

Alternatives to gels include various forms of concentrated sugars, and foods high in simple carbohydrates that can be digested easily. Many runners experiment with consuming energy supplements during training runs to determine what works best for them. Consumption of food while running sometimes makes the runner sick. Runners are advised not to ingest a new food or medicine just prior to or during a race. It is also important to refrain from taking any of the non-steroidal anti-inflammatory class of pain relievers (NSAIDs, e.g., aspirin, ibuprofen, naproxen), as these drugs may change the way the kidneys regulate their blood flow and may lead to serious kidney problems, especially in cases involving moderate to severe dehydration. NSAIDS block the COX-2 enzyme pathway to prevent the production of prostaglandins. These prostaglandins may act as inflammation factors throughout the body, but they also play a crucial role in maintenance of water retention. In less than 5% of the whole population that take NSAIDS, individuals may be more negatively sensitive to renal prostaglandin synthesis inhibition.

=== Temperature ===
A study of the performance of 1.8 million participants in the Berlin, London, Paris, Boston, Chicago, and New York marathons during the years from 2001 to 2010 found that runners recorded their fastest times when the temperature was around 6 °C (43 °F), with an increase of 10 °C (18 °F) leading to a 1.5% reduction in speed. A July 2020 study found that increasing temperatures affected faster runners' performance more than slower ones.

=== After a marathon ===
Marathon participation may result in various medical, musculoskeletal, and dermatological complaints. Delayed onset muscle soreness (DOMS) is a common condition affecting runners during the first week following a marathon. Various types of mild exercise or massage have been recommended to alleviate pain secondary to DOMS. Dermatological issues frequently include "jogger's nipple", "jogger's toe", and blisters.

The immune system is reportedly suppressed for a short time. Changes to the blood chemistry, such as elevated Cardiac Troponin T, may lead physicians to mistakenly diagnose heart malfunction.

After long training runs and the marathon itself, consuming carbohydrates to replace glycogen stores and protein to aid muscle recovery is commonly recommended. In addition, soaking the lower half of the body for approximately 20 minutes in cold or ice water may force blood through the leg muscles to speed recovery.

== Health risks ==
Marathon running has various health risks, though these can be diminished with preparation and care. Training and the races themselves can put runners under stress. While very rare, even death is a possibility during a race.

Common minor health risks include blisters, tendonitis, fatigue, knee or ankle sprain, dehydration (electrolyte imbalance), and other conditions. Many are categorised as overuse injuries.

=== Cardiac health ===
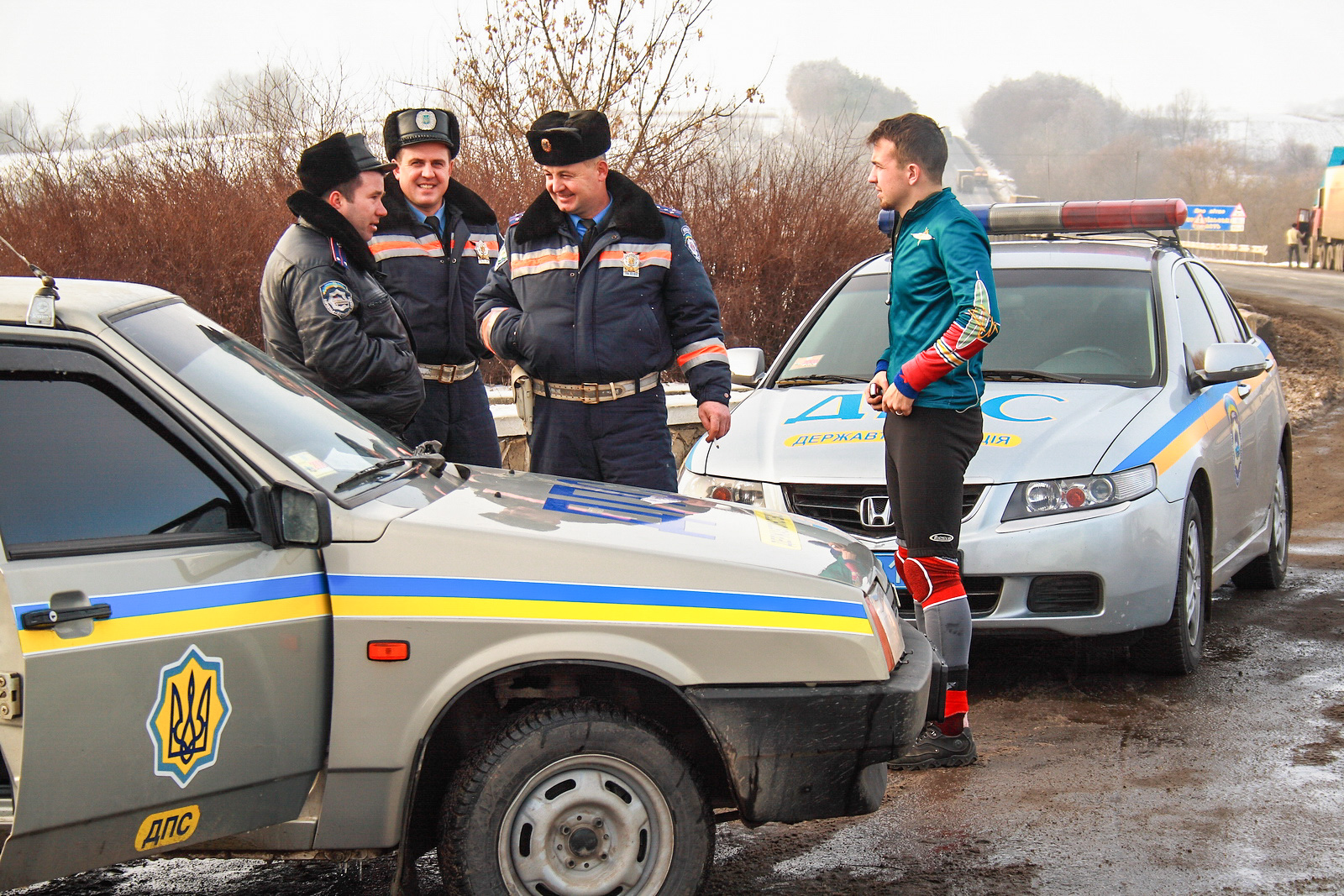
Officers patrolling a marathon course in Ukraine

In 2016, a systematic medical review found that the risk of sudden cardiac death during or immediately after a marathon was between 0.6 and 1.9 deaths per 100,000 participants, varying across the specific studies and the methods used, and not controlling for age or gender. Since the risk is small, cardiac screening programs for marathons are uncommon. However, this review was not an attempt to assess the overall cardiac health impact of marathon running.

A 2006 study of non-elite Boston Marathon participants tested runners for certain proteins that indicate heart damage or dysfunction (see Troponin) and gave them echocardiogram scans, before and after the marathon. The study revealed that, in that sample of 60 people, runners who had averaged fewer than 56 km (35 mi) of weekly training in the 4 months before the race were most likely to show some heart damage or dysfunction, while runners who had done more than 72 km (45 mi) of weekly training showed few or no heart problems.

According to a Canadian study presented in 2010, running a marathon can temporarily result in decreased function of more than half the muscle segments in the heart's main pumping chamber, but neighboring segments are generally able to compensate. Full recovery is reached within three months. The fitter the runner, the less the effect. The runners with decreased left ventricle function had an average peak weekly training distance of 55.1 km (34.2 mi), while those who did not averaged 69.1 km (42.9 mi). The marathon was held in 35 °C (95 °F) weather. According to one of the researchers: "Regular exercise reduces cardiovascular risk by a factor of two or three in the long run, but while we're doing vigorous exercise such as marathon running, our cardiac risk increases by seven."

=== Hydration ===
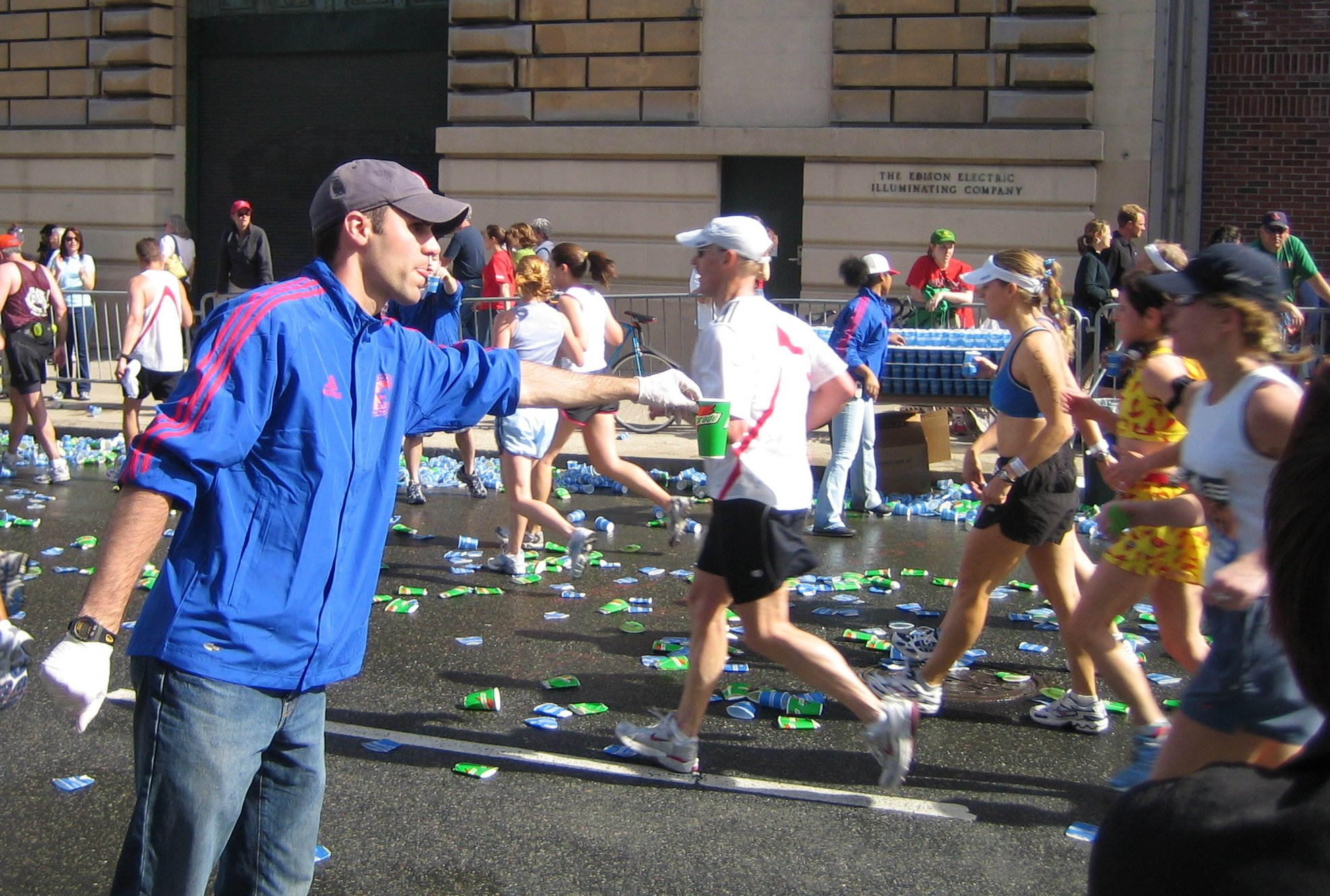
A volunteer hands out fluids at a marathon water stop.

Overconsumption is the most significant concern associated with water consumption during marathons. Drinking excessive amounts of fluid during a race can lead to dilution of sodium in the blood, a condition called exercise-associated hyponatremia, which may result in vomiting, seizures, coma and even death. Dr. Lewis G. Maharam, medical director for the New York City Marathon, stated in 2005: "There are no reported cases of dehydration causing death in the history of world running, but there are plenty of cases of people dying of hyponatremia."

For example, Dr. Cynthia Lucero died at the age of 28 while participating in the 2002 Boston Marathon. It was Lucero's second marathon. At mile 22, Lucero complained of feeling "dehydrated and rubber-legged." She soon wobbled and collapsed to the ground, and was unconscious by the time the paramedics reached her. Lucero was admitted to Brigham and Women's Hospital and died two days later.

Lucero's cause of death was determined to be hyponatremic encephalopathy, a condition that causes swelling of the brain due to an imbalance of sodium in the blood known as exercise-associated hyponatremia (EAH). While EAH is sometimes referred to as "water intoxication", Lucero drank large amounts of Gatorade during the race, demonstrating that runners who consume sodium-containing sports drinks in excess of thirst can still develop EAH. Because hyponatremia is caused by excessive water retention, and not just loss of sodium, consumption of sports drinks or salty foods may not prevent hyponatremia.

Women are more prone to hyponatremia than men. A study in the New England Journal of Medicine found that 13% of runners completing the 2002 Boston Marathon had hyponatremia.

The International Marathon Medical Directors Association (IMMDA) advised in 2006 that fluid intake should be adjusted individually according to factors such as body weight, sex, climate, pace, fitness (VO_{2} max), and sweat rate, as fluid requirements can vary between people depending on these variables. The IMMDA also recommended sports drinks that include carbohydrates and electrolytes instead of plain water and said that runners should "drink to thirst", trying to refrain from drinking at every fluid station before feeling thirsty. Heat exposure leads to diminished thirst drive and thirst may not be a sufficient incentive to drink in many situations. The IMMDA and HSL Harpur Hill give recommendations to drink fluid in small volumes frequently at an approximate rate falling between 100–250 ml (3.4–8.5 US fl oz) every 15 minutes. A patient suffering hyponatremia can be given a small volume of a concentrated salt solution intravenously to raise sodium concentrations in the blood. Some runners weigh themselves before running and write the results on their bibs. If anything goes wrong, first aid workers can use the weight information to tell if the patient had consumed too much water.

=== Body temperature ===
Exertional heat stroke is an emergency condition in which thermoregulation fails and the body temperature rises dangerously above 40 °C (104 °F). It becomes a greater risk in warm and humid weather, even for young and fit individuals. Treatment requires rapid physical cooling of the body.

== Charity involvement ==
Some charities seek to associate with various races. Some marathon organizers set aside a portion of their limited entry slots for charity organizations to sell to members in exchange for donations. Runners are given the option to sign up to run particular races, especially when marathon entries are no longer available to the general public. In some cases, charities organize their own marathon as a fund-raiser, gaining funds via entry fees or sponsorships.

== Culture ==
Mars rover marathon

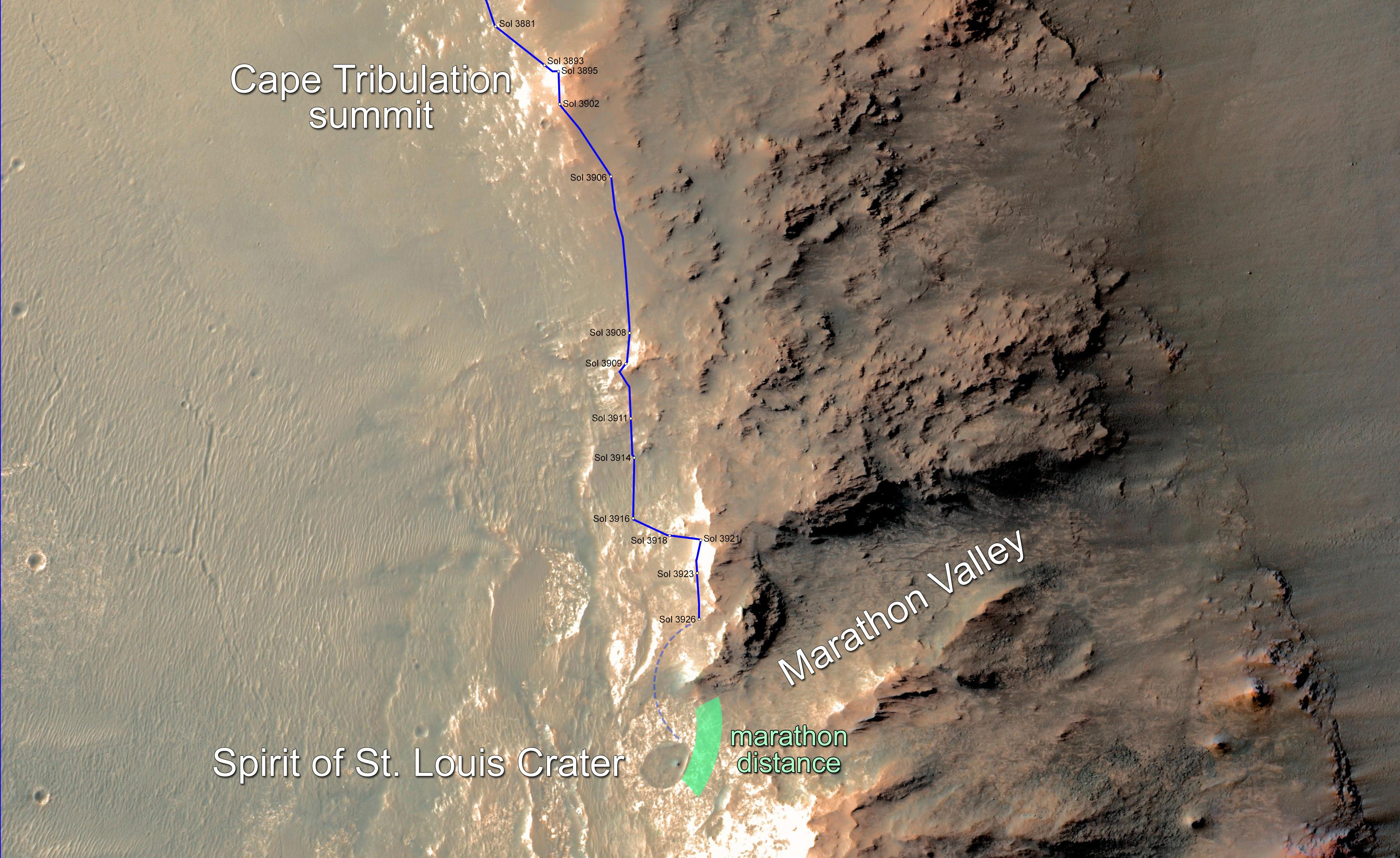
Mars rover Opportunity's traverse in 2015 as it approached the Marathon Valley, and then traveled distance of a traditional marathon (about 42 kilometres (26 mi))

In 2015 the Mars rover Opportunity attained the distance of a marathon from its starting location on Mars. The valley where it achieved this distance was named Marathon Valley, which it then explored.

== See also ==
Records

- Marathon world record progression
- National records in the marathon

Lists

- List of marathon races
- List of marathoners
- List of marathon national champions (men)
- List of non-professional marathon runners

Related races

- Ekiden (marathon relays)
- Half marathon
- Ultramarathon

Other endurance races

- Ironman Triathlon
- Mountain marathon
- Multi-day race
- Ski marathon

Organizations

- 100 Marathon Club
- World Peace Marathon

Notable races

- Ineos 1:59 Challenge
- Man versus Horse Marathon
- Marathons at the Paralympics

Other related topics

- Pacemaker (running)
- Physiology of marathons

== Bibliography ==
- Hans-Joachim Gehrke, "From Athenian identity to European ethnicity: The cultural biography of the myth of Marathon," in Ton Derks, Nico Roymans (ed.), Ethnic Constructs in Antiquity: The Role of Power and Tradition (Amsterdam, Amsterdam University Press, 2009) (Amsterdam Archaeological Studies, 13), 85–100.
- Hans W. Giessen: Mythos Marathon. Von Herodot über Bréal bis zur Gegenwart. (= Landauer Schriften zur Kommunikations- und Kulturwissenschaft. Band 17). Verlag Empirische Pädagogik, Landau 2010
- Tom Derderian, Boston Marathon: History of the World's Premier Running Event, Human Kinetics, 1994, 1996
