= Physiology of marathons =

The physiology of marathons is typically associated with high demands on a marathon runner's cardiovascular system and their locomotor system. The marathon was conceived centuries ago and as of recent has been gaining popularity among many populations around the world. The 42.195 km (26.2 mile) distance is a physical challenge that entails distinct features of an individual's energy metabolism. Marathon runners finish at different times because of individual physiological characteristics.

The interaction between different energy systems captures the essence of why certain physiological characteristics of marathon runners exist. The differing efficiency of certain physiological features in marathon runners evidence the variety of finishing times among elite marathon runners that share similarities in many physiological characteristics. Aside from large aerobic capacities and other biochemical mechanisms, external factors such as the environment and proper nourishment of a marathon runner can further the insight as to why marathon performance is variable despite ideal physiological characteristics obtained by a runner.

== History ==
The first marathon was perhaps a 25 mile run by Pheidippides, a Greek soldier who ran to Athens from the town of Marathon, Greece to deliver news of a battle victory over the Persians in 490 B.C. According to this belief, he dropped dead of exhaustion shortly after arriving in Athens. Thousands of years later, marathon running became part of world sports, starting at the inaugural Marathon in the 1896 Modern Olympic Games. After around 40 years of various distances, the 42.195 kilometer (26.2) mile trek became standard. The number of marathons in the United States has grown over 45 times in this period.

With an increase in popularity, the scientific field has a large basis to analyze some of the physiological characteristics and the factors influencing these traits that led to Pheidippides's death. The high physical and biochemical demands of marathon running and variation across finishing times make for a field of study that entangles multiple facets of human capacities.

== Energy pathways during exercise ==
Humans metabolize food to transfer potential energy from food to adenosine triphosphate (ATP). This molecule provides the human body's instant accessible form of energy for all functions of cells within the body. For exercise the human body places high demand for ATP to supply itself with enough energy to support all the corresponding changes in the body at work. The 3 energy systems involved in exercise are the Phosphogenic, Anaerobic and Aerobic energy pathways. The simultaneous action of these three energy pathways prioritizes one specific pathway over the others depending on the type of exercise an individual is partaking in. This differential prioritization is based on the duration and intensity of the particular exercise. Variable use of these energy pathways is central to the mechanisms that support long, sustained exercise—such as running a marathon.

=== Phosphogenic ===
The phosphogenic (ATP-PC) anaerobic energy pathway restores ATP after its breakdown via creatine phosphate stored in skeletal muscle. This pathway is anaerobic because it does not require oxygen to synthesize or use ATP. ATP restoration only lasts for approximately the first 30 seconds of exercise. This rapid rate of ATP production is essential at the onset of exercise. The amount of creatine phosphate and ATP stored in the muscle is small, readily available, and used quickly due these two factors. Weight lifting or running sprints are examples of exercises that use this energy pathway.

=== Anaerobic ===
The anaerobic glycolytic energy pathway is the source of human energy after the first 30 seconds of an exercise until 3 minutes into that exercise. The first 30 seconds of exercise are most heavily reliant on the phosphogenic pathway for energy production. Through glycolysis, the breakdown of carbohydrates from blood glucose or muscle glycogen stores yields ATP for the body without the need for oxygen. This energy pathway is often thought of as the transitional pathway between the phosphogenic energy pathway and the aerobic energy pathway due to the point in exercise this pathway onsets and terminates. A 300-800 meter run is an example of an exercise that uses this pathway—as it is typically higher intensity than endurance exercise, and only sustained for 30–180 seconds, depending on training.

=== Aerobic (Oxidative) ===
The aerobic energy pathway is the third and slowest ATP producing pathway that is oxygen dependent. This energy pathway typically supplies the bulk of the body's energy during exercise—after three minutes from the onset of exercise until the end, or when the individual experiences fatigue. The body uses this energy pathway for lower intensity exercise that lasts longer than three minutes, which corresponds to the rate at which the body produces ATP using oxygen. This energy system is essential to endurance athletes such as marathon runners, triathletes, cross-country skiers, etc. The Aerobic Energy Pathway is able to produce the largest amount of ATP out of these three systems. This is largely because of this energy system's ability to convert fats, carbohydrates, and protein into a state that can enter the mitochondria, the site of aerobic ATP production.

== Physiological characteristics of marathon runners ==
=== Aerobic capacity (VO_{2Max}) ===
Marathon runners obtain above average aerobic capacities, oftentimes up to 50% larger than normally active individuals. Aerobic capacity or VO_{2Max} is an individual's ability to maximally take up and consume oxygen in all bodily tissue during exhaustive exercise. Aerobic capacity serves as a good measure of exercise intensity as it is the upper limit of one's physical performance. An individual cannot perform any exercise at 100% VO_{2Max} for extended periods of time. The marathon is generally run at about 70-90% of VO_{2Max} and the fractional use of one's aerobic capacity serves as a key component of marathon performance. The physiological mechanisms that aerobic capacity or VO_{2Max} consist of are blood transportation/distribution and the use of this oxygen within muscle cells. VO_{2Max} is one of the most salient indicators of endurance exercise performance. The VO_{2Max} of an elite runner at maximal exercise is almost two times the value of a fit or trained adult at maximal exercise. Marathon runners demonstrate physiological characteristics that enable them to deal with the high demands of a 26.2 mile (42.195 km) run.

==== Components of aerobic capacity ====
The primary components of an individual's VO_{2Max} are the properties of aerobic capacity that influence the fractional use (%VO_{2Max}) of this ability to take up and consume oxygen during exhaustive exercise. The transportation of large amounts of blood to and from the lungs to reach all bodily tissues depends on a high cardiac output and sufficient levels of total body hemoglobin. Hemoglobin is the oxygen carrying protein within blood cells that transports oxygen from the lungs to other bodily tissues via the circulatory system. For effective transportation of oxygen in blood during a marathon, distribution of blood must be efficient. The mechanism that allows for this distribution of oxygen to the muscle cells is muscle blood flow. A 20 fold increase of local blood flow within skeletal muscle is necessary for endurance athletes, like marathon runners, to meet their muscles' oxygen demands at maximal exercise that are up to 50 times greater than at rest. Upon successful transportation and distribution of oxygen in the blood, the extraction and use of the blood within skeletal muscle are what give effect to a marathoner's increased aerobic capacity and the overall improvement of an individual's marathon performance. Extraction of oxygen from the blood is performed by myoglobin within the skeletal muscle cells that accept and store oxygen. These components of aerobic capacity help define the maximal uptake and consumption of oxygen in bodily tissues during exhaustive exercise.

==== Limitations to aerobic capacity (VO_{2Max}) ====
===== Cardiac =====
Marathon runners often present enlarged dimensions of the heart and decreased resting heart rates that enable them to achieve greater aerobic capacities. Although these morphological and functional changes in a marathon runner's heart aid in maximizing their aerobic capacity, these factors are also what set the limit for an individual to maximally take up and consume oxygen in their bodily tissues during endurance exercise. Increased dimensions of the heart enable an individual to achieve a greater stroke volume. A concomitant decrease in stroke volume occurs with the initial increase in heart rate at the onset of exercise. The highest heart rate an individual can achieve is limited and decreases with age (Estimated Maximum Heart Rate = 220 - age in years). Despite an increase in cardiac dimensions, a marathoner's aerobic capacity is confined to this capped and ever decreasing heart rate. An athlete's aerobic capacity cannot continuously increase because their maximum heart rate can only pump a specific volume of blood.

===== Oxygen carrying capacity =====
An individual running a marathon experiences appropriation of blood to the skeletal muscles. This distribution of blood maximizes oxygen extraction by the skeletal muscles to aerobically produce as much ATP needed to meet demand. To achieve this, blood volume increases. The initial increase in blood volume during marathon running can later lead to decreased blood volume as a result of increased core body temperature, pH changes in skeletal muscles, and the increased dehydration associated with cooling during such exercise. Oxygen affinity of the blood depends on blood plasma volume and an overall decrease in blood volume. Dehydration, temperature and pH differences between the lungs and the muscle capillaries can limit one's ability to fractionally use their aerobic capacity (%VO_{2Max}).

==== Secondary limitations ====
Other limitations affecting a marathon runner's VO_{2Max} include pulmonary diffusion, mitochondria enzyme activity, and capillary density. These features of a marathon runner can be enlarged compared to that of an untrained individual but have upper limits determined by the body. Improved mitochondria enzyme activity and increased capillary density likely accommodate more aerobically produced ATP. These increases only occur to a certain point and help to determine peak aerobic capacity. Especially in fit individuals, the pulmonary diffusion of these individuals correlates strongly with VO_{2Max} and can limit these individuals in an inability to efficiently saturate hemoglobin with oxygen due to large cardiac output. The shorter transit time of larger amounts of blood being pumped per unit time can be attributed to this insufficient oxygen saturation often seen in well trained athletes such as marathoners. Not all inspired air and its components make it into the pulmonary system due to the human body's anatomical dead space, which, in terms of exercise, is a source of oxygen wasted.

=== Running economy ===
Despite being one of the most salient predictors of marathon performance, a large VO_{2Max} is only one of the factors that may affect marathon performance. A marathoner's running economy is their sub maximal requirement for oxygen at specific speeds. This concept of running economy helps explain different marathon times for runners with similar aerobic capacities. The steady state oxygen consumption used to define running economy demonstrates the energy cost of running at sub maximal speeds. This is often measured by the volume of oxygen consumed, either in liters or milliliters, per kilogram of body weight per minute (L/kg/min or mL/kg/min). Discrepancies in time of winning performances of various marathon runners with almost identical VO_{2Max} and %VO_{2Max} values can be explained by different levels of oxygen consumption per minute at the same speeds. For this reason, it can be seen that Jim McDonagh has run the marathon faster than Ted Corbitt in his winning performances compared to that of Corbitt. This greater requirement for sub maximal oxygen consumption (3.3L of oxygen per minute for Corbitt vs. 3.0L of oxygen per minute for McDonagh) is positively correlated with a greater level of energy expenditure while running the same speed.

Running economy (efficiency) can be credited with being an important factor in elite marathon performance as energy expenditure is weakly correlated with a runner's mean velocity increase. A disparity in running economy determined differences in marathon performance and the efficiency of these runners exemplifies the marginal differences in total energy expenditure when running at greater velocities than recreational athletes.

=== Lactate threshold ===
A marathon runner's velocity at lactate threshold is strongly correlated to their performance. Lactate threshold or anaerobic threshold is considered a good indicator of the body's ability to efficiently process and transfer chemical energy into mechanical energy. A marathon is considered an aerobic dominant exercise, but higher intensities associated with elite performance use a larger percentage of anaerobic energy. The lactate threshold is the cross over point between predominantly aerobic energy usage and anaerobic energy usage. This cross over is associated with the anaerobic energy system's inability to efficiently produce energy leading to the buildup of blood lactate often associated with muscle fatigue. In endurance trained athletes, the increase in blood lactate concentration appears at about 75%-90%VO_{2Max}, which directly corresponds to the VO_{2Max} marathoner's run at. With this high of an intensity endured for over two hours, a marathon runner's performance requires more energy production than that solely supplied by mitochondrial activity. This causes a higher anaerobic to aerobic energy ratio during a marathon. The higher the velocity and fractional use of aerobic capacity an individual has at their lactic threshold, the better their overall performance.

Uncertainty exists about how lactate threshold effects endurance performance. Contribution of blood lactate levels accumulating is attributed to potential skeletal muscle hypoxemia but also to the production of more glucose that can be used as energy. The inability to establish a singular set of physiological contributions to blood lactate accumulation's effect on the exercising individual creates a correlative role for lactate threshold in marathon performance as opposed to a causal role.

== Alternative factors contributing to marathon performance ==
=== Fuel ===
To sustain high intensity running, a marathon runner must obtain sufficient glycogen stores. Glycogen can be found in the skeletal muscles or liver. With low levels of glycogen stores at the onset of the marathon, premature depletion of these stores can reduce performance or even prevent completion of the race. ATP production via aerobic pathways can further be limited by glycogen depletion. Free Fatty Acids serve as a sparing mechanism for glycogen stores. The artificial elevation of these fatty acids along with endurance training demonstrate a marathon runner's ability to sustain higher intensities for longer periods of time. The prolonged sustenance of running intensity is attributed to a high turnover rate of fatty acids that allows the runner to preserve glycogen stores later into the race.

Some suggest that ingesting monosaccharides at low concentrations during the race could delay glycogen depletion. This lower concentration, as opposed to a high concentration of monosaccharides, is proposed as a means to maintain a more efficient gastric emptying and faster intestinal uptake of this energy source. Carbohydrates may be the most efficient source of energy for ATP. Pasta parties and the consumption of carbohydrates in the days leading up to a marathon are common practice of marathon runners at all levels.

=== Thermo-regulation and body fluid loss ===
Maintaining internal core body temperature is crucial to a marathon runner's performance and health. An inability to reduce rising core body temperature can lead to hyperthermia. To reduce body heat, the body must remove metabolically produced heat by sweating (also known as evaporative cooling). Heat dissipation by sweat evaporation can lead to significant bodily water loss. A marathon runner can lose water adding up to about 8% of body weight. Fluid replacement is limited, but can help keep internal temperatures cooler. Fluid replacement is physiologically challenging during exercise of this intensity due to the inefficient emptying of the stomach. Partial fluid replacement can serve to avoid a marathon runner's body over heating but not enough to keep pace with the loss of fluid via sweat evaporation.

=== Environmental factors ===
Environmental factors such as air resistance, rain, terrain, and heat contribute to a marathon runner's ability to perform at their full physiological ability. Air resistance or wind, and the marathon course terrain (hilly or flat) are factors. Rain can affect performance by adding weight to the runner's attire. Temperature, in particular heat, is the strongest environmental impediment to marathon performance. An increase in air temperature affects all the runners the same. This negative correlation of increased temperature and decreased race time is affiliated with marathon runners' hospitalizations and exercise induced hyperthermia. There are other environmental factors less directly associated with marathon performance such as the pollutants in the air and even prize money associated with a specific marathon itself.
