= Exercise-associated hyponatremia =

- Other names: EAH

Exercise-associated hyponatremia (EAH) is a fluid-electrolyte disorder caused by a decrease in sodium levels (hyponatremia) during or up to 24 hours after prolonged physical activity. This disorder can develop when marathon runners or endurance event athletes drink more fluid, usually water or sports drinks, than their kidneys can excrete. This excess water can severely dilute the level of sodium in the blood needed for organs, especially the brain, to function properly.

The incidence of EAH in athletes has increased in recent years, especially in the United States, as marathon races and endurance events have become more popular. A recent study showed 13% of the Boston 2002 marathon runners experienced EAH; most cases were mild. Eight deaths from EAH have been documented since 1985.

== Symptoms and signs ==
Symptoms may be absent or mild for the early onset of EAH and can include impaired exercise performance, nausea, vomiting, headache, bloating, and swelling of hands, legs, and feet. As water retention increases, weight gain may also occur. More severe symptoms include pulmonary edema and hyponatremic encephalopathy. Symptoms of hyponatremic encephalopathy are associated with an altered level of consciousness and can include sullenness, sleepiness, withdrawing from social interaction, photophobia, and seizures.

== Causes ==
The primary causes of EAH include excessive fluid retention during exercise with a significant sodium deficit and excessive fluid intake leading to an increase in total body water resulting in a reduction in blood sodium levels.

Athlete-specific risk factors are being of female sex, use of non-steroidal anti-inflammatory drugs [NSAIDs], slow running, excessive fluid ingestion, low body weight, and event inexperience. Event-specific risk factors are high availability of drinking fluids, duration of exercise exceeding four hours, unusually hot environmental conditions, and extreme cold temperature.

== Mechanism ==
Sodium is an important electrolyte needed for maintaining blood pressure. Sodium is mainly found in the body fluids that surround the cells and is necessary for nerves, muscles, and other body tissues to function properly.

Many factors may contribute to the development of EAH. Under normal conditions, sodium and water levels are regulated by the renal and hormonal systems. The decrease in sodium levels can occur due to a defect in the renal and hormonal systems, an overwhelming increase in water consumption and excessive loss of sodium through sweating. When the sodium levels outside of the cells decrease, water moves into the cells. The cells begin to increase in size. When several cells in one area begin to increase in size, swelling occurs in the affected area. Swelling is commonly observed in hands, legs, and feet.

Sodium is also important in regulating the amount of water that passes through the blood–brain barrier. Decreased sodium blood levels result in increased permeability of water across the blood–brain barrier. This increased influx of water causes brain swelling which leads to severe neurological symptoms.

== Diagnosis ==
EAH is categorized by having a blood serum or plasma sodium level below normal, which is less than 135 mmol/L. Asymptomatic EAH is not normally detected unless the athlete has had a sodium blood serum or plasma test. Hyponatremic encephalopathy may be detected using brain imaging studies and pulmonary edema may be confirmed by x-ray.

== Prevention ==
Traditional prevention of EAH focuses on reducing fluid consumption to avoid fluid retention before, during, and after exercise.

However, since this can risk dehydration, an alternative approach is possible of consuming a substantial amount of salt (NaCl) prior to exercise. It is still important not to overconsume water to the extent of requiring urination, because urination would cause the extra salt to be excreted.

=== Role of thirst ===
In a published statement of the Third International Exercise-Associated Hyponatremia Consensus Development Conference, researchers concluded that drinking in accordance with the sensation of thirst is sufficient for preventing both dehydration and hyponatremia. This advice is contradicted by the American College of Sports Medicine, which has previously recommended athletes drink "as much as tolerable." In October 2015, ACSM President W. Larry Kenney stated that "[T]he clear and important health message should be that thirst alone is not the best indicator of dehydration or the body's fluid needs."

In a letter to the editors of The Journal of Wilderness and Environmental Medicine, Brad L. Bennett, PhD claimed "perpetuation of the myth that one needs to drink beyond the dictates of thirst can be deadly." Similarly, authors of the Statement of the Third International Exercise-Associated Hyponatremia Consensus Development Conference claim this advice has "facilitated inadvertent overdrinking and pathological dilutional EAH."

Critics of the ACSM's view have questioned their motives, pointing out that Gatorade is one of the organizations "platinum sponsors."

== Treatment ==
Treatments are focused on the underlying cause of hyponatremia and include fluid restriction and saline. When EAH is treated early, complete recovery is expected.

Data from one study suggests that immediate administration of 100 mL intravenous bolus of 3% hypertonic saline was more effective at normalizing blood sodium levels than oral administration for asymptomatic EAH.

Athletes experiencing EAH encephalopathy may also receive high-flow oxygen and a rapid infusion of 100 mL of 3% NaCl to reduce brain edema.
