= 100 Marathon Club =

Club for marathon and ultra marathon runners

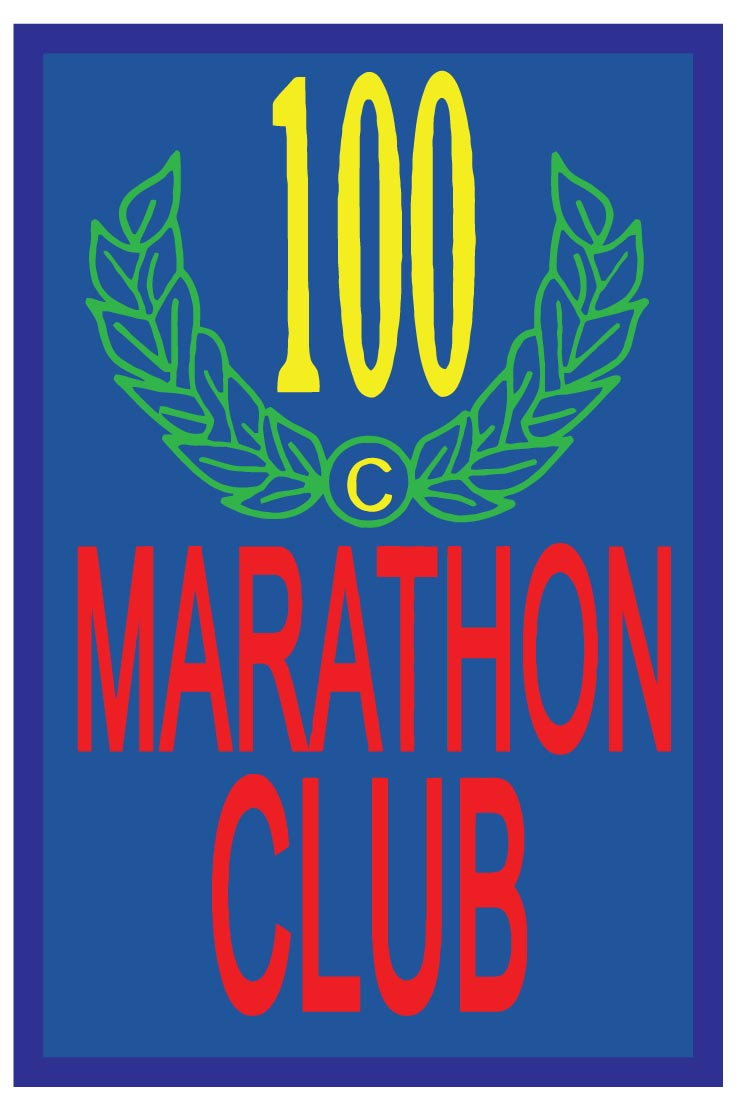
100 Marathon Club The 100 Marathon Club Logo
- Region served: National
- Chairman: Maryanne Atkins and Gary Dixon
- Affiliations: UK Athletics

The 100 Marathon Club is a club for marathon and ultra marathon runners. It has a membership that is primarily based in the UK, but with additional members from outside Britain.

The 100 Marathon Club is affiliated to UK Athletics.

== Membership ==
The 100 Marathon Club has two types of membership: full and associate.

Full membership is available to anyone who has run and completed at least 100 marathons or Ultra Marathons (ultras), whereas for associate membership, a runner only needs to have run at least 50 marathons or Ultras.

== Other 100 Marathon Clubs ==
There are other 100 Marathon Clubs outside the UK, unconnected with the British one, including:

- 100 Marathon Club Austria
- 100 Marathon Club Australia
- 100 Marathon Club Danmark
- 100 Marathon Club Deutschland e.V.
- 100 Marathon Club Dutch
- 100 Marathon Club Czech
- 100 Marathons Club Estonia
- 100 Marathon Club Finland
- 100 Marathons Club France
- 100 Marathons Club Japan
- 100 Marathons Club Ireland
- 100 Marathons Club Italy
- 100 Marathon Club The Netherlands
- 100 Marathon Club North America
- 100 Marathon Club Norway
- 100 Marathon Club Russia
- 100 Marathon Club Schweiz
- 100 Marathons Club Serbia
- 100 Marathons Club Slovakia
- 100 Marathons Club Sweden
- 100 Marathons Club Taiwan
- 100 Marathon Club Poland
