= 2010 European Athletics Championships – Men's marathon =

Men's marathon at the European Athletics Championships

The men's marathon at the 2010 European Athletics Championships was held on the streets of Barcelona on 1 August.

== Background ==
A total of 70 runners were declared for the race. Of those, 20 were identified as contenders for medal positions, with Switzerland's Viktor Röthlin and Spain's José Ríos among the favourites. Also a contender was defending champion Italian Stefano Baldini, with the race billed as his return to racing after two years, since finishing 12th in the Olympic marathon. José Manuel Martínez, another Spaniard, was the leading European in the previous year's World Championships marathon where he finished eighth. Four of the Spanish runners warned before the race that heat and humidity would be the main handicaps to the competitors and force a slow and tactical race. The race would be run over four relatively flat laps of 10 km around the city of Barcelona.

== Race details ==
The race started at 10:05 CEST with a field of 64 taking to the start line. It was run in hot conditions with the temperature at the start of the race 25 °C (77 °F) and the humidity rated at 74 per cent. The early pace was set by Russian Yuriy Abramov, winner of the 2010 Moscow Marathon. However, when he fell back, Röthlin was among the leading pack. The Swiss runner set a pace that the rest of the field could not compete with and he ran the final quarter of the race by himself to win by two minutes 19 seconds on Swiss National Day. Second place was home runner Martínez, who said he could not compete with Röthlin's pace so instead decided to hold a steady rhythm and not get involved in any counter-attacks. Bronze medal winner was Russian Dmitriy Safronov. Röthlin's victory was only the fourth gold for Switzerland at the European championships and their first since shot putter Werner Günthör won in the 1986 championships. Baldini's attempt to defend his title ended when he pulled out half-way through the race. Only 45 of the athletes finished the race.

The race also counted for the European Cup team result, with the teams decided on the fastest sum time of their first three athletes. Hosts Spain won the gold, ahead of Russia and Italy.

== Reaction ==
Röthlin said after the race: "It's fantastic to do this on Swiss National Day. After everything that's happened over the past two years, this is incredible. I wouldn't have come had I not been in with a medal chance." He also made light of the warm weather, saying it was cool compared to the 2007 World Championships marathon in Osaka, Japan. Silver medalist Martínez said: "I just tried ... not [to] get involved with any counter-attacks as I've tried in the past and I'm very satisfied with my silver."

== Medalists ==
Gold	Viktor Röthlin; Switzerland (SUI)
Silver	José Manuel Martínez; Spain (ESP)
Bronze	Dmitriy Safronov; Russia (RUS)

== Records ==
Standing records prior to the 2010 European Athletics Championships
World record	Haile Gebrselassie (ETH)	2:03:59	Berlin, Germany	28 September 2008
European record	Benoît Zwierzchiewski (FRA)	2:06.36	Paris, France	6 April 2003
Championship record	Martín Fiz (ESP)	2:10:31	Helsinki, Finland	14 August 1994
World Leading	Patrick Makau Musyoki (KEN)	2:04:48	Rotterdam, Netherlands	11 April 2010
European Leading	Iaroslav Musinschi (MDA)	2:08:32	Düsseldorf, Germany	2 May 2010

== Schedule ==
Date	Time	Round
1 August 2010	10:05	Final

== Results ==
=== Final ===
Rank	Athlete	Nationality	Time	Notes
1st place, gold medalist(s)	Viktor Röthlin	Switzerland	2:15:31	
2nd place, silver medalist(s)	José Manuel Martínez	Spain	2:17:50	
3rd place, bronze medalist(s)	Dmitriy Safronov	Russia	2:18:16	
4	Ruggero Pertile	Italy	2:19:33	
5	Pablo Villalobos	Spain	2:19:56	
6	Rafael Iglesias	Spain	2:20:14	
7	Migidio Bourifa	Italy	2:20:35	
8	Lee Merrien	Great Britain & N.I.	2:20:42	
9	Aleksey Sokolov	Russia	2:20:49	
10	Luís Feiteira	Portugal	2:21:28	
11	Ottaviano Andriani	Italy	2:21:32	
12	Mariusz Giżyński	Poland	2:21:54	
13	Rens Dekkers	Netherlands	2:22:03	
14	Hugo van den Broek	Netherlands	2:22:06	
15	Oleg Kulkov	Russia	2:22:24	
16	Dave Webb	Great Britain & N.I.	2:23:04	
17	Koen Raymaekers	Netherlands	2:23:24	
18	Günther Weidlinger	Austria	2:23:37	
19	Dan Robinson	Great Britain & N.I.	2:24:06	
20	Alberto Chaíça	Portugal	2:24:14	
21	Erik Petersson	Sweden	2:24:29	
22	Wodage Zwadya	Israel	2:24:39	
23	Ayele Setegne	Israel	2:26:26	
24	Ben Moreau	Great Britain & N.I.	2:27:08	
25	Oleksiy Rybalchenko	Ukraine	2:27:34	
26	Patrick Stitzinger	Netherlands	2:28:02	
27	Vasyl Matviychuk	Ukraine	2:28:26	
28	Martin Williams	Great Britain & N.I.	2:28:30	
29	Jesper Faurschou	Denmark	2:28:34	
30	Dastaho Svnech	Israel	2:28:36	
31	Daniele Caimmi	Italy	2:29:18	
32	Anton Kosmac	Slovenia	2:29:56	
33	Toni Bernadó	Andorra	2:30:52	
34	Brihun Weve	Israel	2:31:47	
35	Primoz Kobe	Slovenia	2:31:47	
36	Kristoffer Österlund	Sweden	2:32:16	
37	Ronald Schröer	Netherlands	2:33:18	
38	Zohar Zemiro	Israel	2:36:58	
39	Marcel Tschopp	Liechtenstein	2:37:14	
40	Robert Kotnik	Slovenia	2:40:57	
41	Javier Díaz	Spain	2:42:41	
42	José Moreira	Portugal	2:43:56	
43	Ivan Ramirez	Andorra	2:51:42	
44	Christian Pflügl	Austria	2:53:15	
45	Alan Manchado	Andorra	3:12:40	
	Tobias Sauter	Germany	DNF	
	Adam Draczyński	Poland	DNF	
	Denis Curzi	Italy	DNF	
	Ignacio Cáceres	Spain	DNF	
	Fernando Silva	Portugal	DNF	
	Yuriy Abramov	Russia	DNF	
	Oleksandr Sitkobskyy	Ukraine	DNF	
	Henryk Szost	Poland	DNF	
	Tilahun Aliyev	Azerbaijan	DNF	
	José Ríos	Spain	DNF	
	Adil Bouafif	Sweden	DNF	
	Martin Beckmann	Germany	DNF	
	Øystein Sylta	Norway	DNF	
	Andi Jones	Great Britain & N.I.	DNF	
	Hermano Ferreira	Portugal	DNF	
	James Theuri	France	DNF	
	Stefano Baldini	Italy	DNF	
	Florian Prüller	Austria	DNF	
	Jordi Royo Lozano	Andorra	DNF	

== See also ==
- 2010 European Marathon Cup
