= 2010 European Marathon Cup =

2010 Marathon competition held in Barcelona, Spain

The 2010 European Marathon Cup was the ninth edition of the European Marathon Cup of athletics and were held in Barcelona, Spain, inside of the 2010 European Championships.

== Results ==
Team men
#	Nations	Time
1	Spain	6:58:00
2	Russia	7:01:29
3	Italy	7:01:40

Team women
#	Nations	Time
1	Italy	7:46:18
2	United Kingdom	8:00:36
3	Ukraine	8:08:53

Individual men
Rank	Athlete	Nationality	Time	Notes
1st place, gold medalist(s)	Viktor Röthlin	Switzerland	2:15:31	
2nd place, silver medalist(s)	José Manuel Martínez	Spain	2:17:50	
3rd place, bronze medalist(s)	Dmitriy Safronov	Russia	2:18:16	
4	Ruggero Pertile	Italy	2:19:33	
5	Pablo Villalobos	Spain	2:19:56	
6	Rafael Iglesias	Spain	2:20:14	
7	Migidio Bourifa	Italy	2:20:35	
8	Lee Merrien	Great Britain & N.I.	2:20:42	
9	Aleksey Sokolov	Russia	2:20:49	
10	Luís Feiteira	Portugal	2:21:28	

Individual women
Rank	Name	Nationality	Time	Notes
1st place, gold medalist(s)	Anna Incerti	Italy	2:32:48	
2nd place, silver medalist(s)	Tetyana Filonyuk	Ukraine	2:33:57	
3rd place, bronze medalist(s)	Isabellah Andersson	Sweden	2:34:43	
4	Olivera Jevtić	Serbia	2:34:56	
5	Alessandra Aguilar	Spain	2:35:04	
6	Marisa Barros	Portugal	2:35:43	
7	Irina Timofeyeva	Russia	2:35:53	
8	Rosaria Console	Italy	2:36:20	
9	Silviya Skvortsova	Russia	2:36:31	
10	Lidia Șimon	Romania	2:36:52	

== See also ==
- 2010 European Athletics Championships – Men's Marathon
- 2010 European Athletics Championships – Women's Marathon
