= Robert Cheboror =

Kenyan long-distance runner (born 1978)

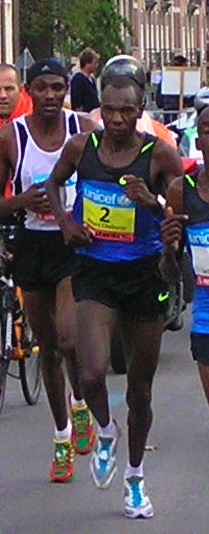
Robert Cheboror, Amsterdam 2008

Robert Cheboror (born 1978 in Kipsaos, Keiyo District) is a Kenyan long-distance runner who specializes in the marathon.

== Biography ==
He won the Lille Métropole Half Marathon in 2002, setting a personal best of 1:01:42 for the half marathon distance. At the Berlin Half Marathon the following year, Cheboror came near his best with a run of 1:01:55 for second behind Paul Kirui.

He acted as the pacemaker for the 2003 Amsterdam Marathon and he continued running past the usual 35 km drop-out mark, eventually finishing in ninth place to record his first marathon finish in a time of 2:11:06. He finished in third place at the inaugural Rotterdam Half Marathon event, crossing the line in 1:02:31.

In April 2004, he finished second at the 108th Boston Marathon, finishing a minute behind the race winner Timothy Cherigat. With a course record of 2:06:23 hours at the 2004 Amsterdam Marathon, he was the third best runner in the world that season, only behind Felix Limo and Evans Rutto.

He and Hilda Kibet completed a Kenyan sweep of the men's and women's races at the 2005 Egmond aan Zee Half Marathon. At the City-Pier-City Loop in March he finished in seventh place. Later that year he was second at the British 10km London Run, finishing behind Haile Gebrselassie who set an all-comers record. His marathon competitions that year failed to build upon the success of 2004, as he was eleventh in the marathon at the 2005 World Championships in Athletics and fourteenth at the New York Marathon.

He returned to his peak marathon form in 2006, starting with a runner-up placing at the Hamburg Marathon in April where he finished the race in 2:07:37 (the second fastest of his career) to beat all except the Spanish record-breaking Julio Rey. He ran at the Chicago Marathon in October, completing the race in a time of 2:09:25 to take fifth place behind Abdi Abdirahman.

In a low-key 2007, he competed at the Boston Marathon and finished in tenth place. He returned to the Amsterdam race in 2008 and took third place behind Paul Kirui and Chala Dechase. In the following seasons he continued to run in marathon but was some distance off his career best times: he was fourth at the 2009 Shanghai Marathon with a time of 2:13:48, and fifth at the Milan Marathon in 2010 (2:13:46). He was part of the field of the 2010 Chuncheon Marathon but dropped out mid-race.

== Achievements ==
Year	Competition	Venue	Position	Notes
2004	Amsterdam Marathon	Amsterdam, Netherlands	1st	Marathon
2005	World Championships	Helsinki, Finland	11th	Marathon
2008	Amsterdam Marathon	Amsterdam, Netherlands	3rd	Marathon
