= 2005 World Championships in Athletics – Men's marathon =

The Men's Marathon race at the 2005 World Championships in Athletics was held on August 13 in the streets of Helsinki with the goal line situated in the Helsinki Olympic Stadium.

Eventual winner Jaouad Gharib attacked just before 30 km mark, getting Italian Olympic champion Stefano Baldini with him. Baldini had cramps few kilometres later and he retired after 35 kilometres.

== Medalists ==
Gold	Jaouad Gharib; Morocco (MAR)
Silver	Christopher Isengwe; Tanzania (TAN)
Bronze	Tsuyoshi Ogata; Japan (JPN)

== Abbreviations ==
- All times shown are in hours:minutes:seconds

DNS	did not start
NM	no mark
WR	world record
WL	world leading
AR	area record
NR	national record
PB	personal best
SB	season best

== Records ==
Standing records prior to the 2005 World Athletics Championships
World Record	Paul Tergat (KEN)	2:04:55	September 28, 2003	Berlin, Germany
Event Record	Jaouad Gharib (MAR)	2:08:31	August 30, 2003	Paris, France
Season Best	Martin Lel (KEN)	2:07:26	April 17, 2005	London, United Kingdom

== Finishing times ==
1. Jaouad Gharib, Morocco 2:10:10
2. Christopher Isengwe, Tanzania 2:10:21 (PB)
3. Tsuyoshi Ogata, Japan 2:11:16 (SB)
4. Toshinari Takaoka, Japan 2:11:53
5. Samson Ramadhani, Tanzania 2:12:08 (SB)
6. Alex Malinga, Uganda 2:12:12 (NR)
7. Paul Biwott, Kenya 2:12:39
8. Julio Rey, Spain 2:12:51
9. Brian Sell, United States 2:13:27 (SB)
10. Marilson Gomes dos Santos, Brazil 2:13:40 (SB)
11. Robert Cheboror, Kenya 2:14:08 (SB)
12. Dan Robinson, Great Britain 2:14:26 (SB)
13. Gudisa Shentama, Ethiopia 2:15:13
14. Wataru Okutani, Japan 2:15:30
15. Luc Krotwaar, Netherlands 2:15:47 (SB)
16. Rafał Wójcik, Poland 2:16:24
17. Ottaviano Andriani, Italy 2:16:29
18. Luís Jesus, Portugal 2:16:33 (SB)
19. Ambesse Tolosa, Ethiopia 2:16:36
20. Satoshi Irifune, Japan 2:17:22
21. Haile Satayin, Israel 2:17:26 (SB)
22. Clinton Verran, United States 2:17:42 (SB)
23. Abdelkebir Lamachi, Morocco 2:17:53
24. Luís Novo, Portugal 2:18:36 (SB)
25. Yared Asmerom, Eritrea 2:18:46 (SB)
26. Antoni Bernadó, Andorra 2:19:06
27. Scott Westcott, Australia 2:19:18
28. Scott Winton, New Zealand 2:19:41
29. Joseph Riri, Kenya 2:19:51
30. José Manuel Martínez, Spain 2:20:07
31. Hailu Negussie, Ethiopia 2:20:25
32. Ri Kyong-Chol, North Korea 2:20:35
33. André Luiz Ramos, Brazil 2:21:06
34. Juan Vargas, Mexico 2:21:29
35. Ruggero Pertile, Italy 2:21:34
36. Abdelhakim Bagy, France 2:21:49 (SB)
37. Wodage Zvadya, Israel 2:21:57 (SB)
38. Nelson Cruz, Cape Verde 2:22:12 (NR)
39. Francis Kirwa, Finland 2:22:22
40. Jason Lehmkuhle, United States 2:22:46 (SB)
41. Claudir Rodrigues, Brazil 2:23:11 (SB)
42. Pamenos Ballantyne, Saint Vincent and the Grenadines 2:23:18 (SB)
43. Jonathan Wyatt, New Zealand 2:23:19
44. Huw Lobb, Great Britain 2:23:38
45. Alberto Chaíça, Portugal 2:23:42 (SB)
46. Grigoriy Andreyev, Russia 2:23:50
47. Asaf Bimro, Israel 2:23:58
48. Michitaka Hosokawa, Japan 2:24:38
49. Clodoaldo da Silva, Brazil 2:25:02
50. Kamal Ziani, Spain 2:25:06
51. Peter Gilmore, United States 2:25:17
52. Alfredo Arévalo, Guatemala 2:25:37 (SB)
53. Yrjö Pesonen, Finland 2:25:39
54. Je In-Mo, South Korea 2:26:39
55. Ismaïl Sghyr, France 2:27:07
56. Oleg Bolkhovets, Russia 2:27:08
57. Cristian Villavicencio, Nicaragua 2:27:50
58. Jeroen van Damme, Netherlands 2:29:22
59. Chad Johnson, United States 2:30:45
60. Cho Keun-Hyung, South Korea 2:31:59
61. Bat-Ochiryn Ser-Od, Mongolia 2:36:31

=== Athletes who did not finish ===
- Ahmed Jumaa Jaber, Qatar
- António Sousa, Portugal
- Aman Majid Awadh, Qatar
- Saïd Belhout, Algeria
- David Ramard, France
- Wilson Onsare, Kenya
- José Ríos, Spain
- Stefano Baldini, Italy
- Vanderlei de Lima, Brazil
- Anuradha Cooray, Sri Lanka
- Collin Khoza, South Africa
- Khalid El Boumlili, Morocco
- Al Mustafa Riyadh, Bahrain
- Getuli Bayo, Tanzania
- Abderrahime Bouramdane, Morocco
- Dmitriy Burmakin, Russia
- Gashaw Melese, Ethiopia
- Tsotang Simon Maine, Lesotho
- Tuomo Lehtinen, Finland
- Migidio Bourifa, Italy
- Jimmy Muindi, Kenya
- Alberico di Cecco, Italy
- Kim Yi-Yong, South Korea
- Janne Holmén, Finland
- José Amado García, Guatemala
- Shadrack Hoff, South Africa
- Gert Thys, South Africa
- Zepherinus Joseph, Saint Lucia
- Hendrick Ramaala, South Africa
- Makhosonke Fika, South Africa
- Ahmed Ezzobayry, France
- Jean-Paul Gahimbaré, Burundi
- Zebedayo Bayo, Tanzania

=== Athletes who did not start ===
- David Sumukwo, Uganda

== See also ==
- Men's Olympic Marathon (2004)
- 2005 World Marathon Cup
