= Jaouad Gharib =

Moroccan long-distance runner

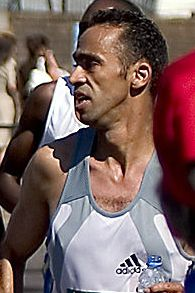
- Gharib at the 2005 London Marathon

Medal record

Men's athletics

Representing Morocco

Olympic Games
Silver medal – second place	2008 Beijing	Marathon

World Championships
Gold medal – first place	2003 Paris	Marathon
Gold medal – first place	2005 Helsinki	Marathon

Mediterranean Games
Gold medal – first place	2001 Radès	10,000 m

Half Marathon World Championships
Silver medal – second place	2002 Brussels	Half marathon

Jaouad Gharib (Arabic: جواد غريب, born 22 May 1972 in Khenifra, Morocco) is a Moroccan long-distance runner who competes in the marathon. Winner of the 2003 World Championships and 2005 World Championships over the distance, he is also notable because he only began running seriously at the age of twenty-two. His 2005 retention made him the second successive world championship marathon champion, after Abel Antón. He was the silver medallist in the marathon at the 2008 Summer Olympics.

== Career ==
=== Early years ===
Jaouad Gharib was born in Khenifra, Middle Atlas to Berber parents but he became an orphan. His favourite sport as a child was football and it was not until 1992, when he watched the Marrakech Marathon live on television, that he began to take an interest in athletics. His talent for long-distance running quickly became apparent as he won races for the Moroccan Royal Guard as well as other national level competitions. Gharib made his first international competitions in 2001, taking ninth at the 2001 IAAF World Half Marathon Championships and eleventh in the 10,000 metres at the 2001 World Championships in Athletics. He won the gold medal on the track at the 2001 Mediterranean Games. Former athletes Aziz Daouda and Brahim Boutayeb convinced Gharib to focus on longer road events, sensing his potential for further distances.

He ran at the 2002 IAAF World Cross Country Championships the following year and a tenth-place finish in the long race gained him a team bronze medal with the Moroccan men, which was led by Abderrahim Goumri. He scored a silver medal at the 2002 IAAF World Half Marathon Championships as he set a personal best of 1:00:42 to finish seconds behind the winner Paul Malakwen Kosgei. An appearance over 10,000 m 2002 African Championships in Athletics resulted in an eighth-place finish.

=== Back-to-back World Champion ===
He made his global indoor debut in the 3000 metres at the 2003 IAAF World Indoor Championships, taking twelfth in the final. Another appearance at the World Cross Country Championships brought him another team bronze, although he managed only 23rd place on that occasion. His appearance at that competition was made at the behest of the Moroccan team director and he took part merely as preparation for his impending debut over the marathon distance. Following the coaching of former Olympic champion Brahim Boutayeb, he took part in the Rotterdam Marathon a month later, running a time of 2:09:15 for sixth. Following a half marathon win in Johannesburg, he entered the marathon race at the 2003 World Championships in Athletics. Despite it being only his second outing over the distance, he saw off Michael Kosgei Rotich and Julio Rey to forge a lead in the final stages and win the gold medal in a Championship record time of 2:08:31.

He continued to focus on road running in 2004, beginning with a run of 59:56 minutes at the Lisbon Half Marathon for fourth place on the downhill course. Next came the London Marathon, where he finished third behind Evans Rutto and Sammy Korir and set a personal best of 2:07:02 despite slipping and banging his head mid-race. He competed at his first Olympics at the 2004 Athens Games but failed to match his previous global form and finished in eleventh place in the men's marathon. A groin injury in the run-up to the competition and Gharib reflected that he had pushed himself too much in training during the two weeks before the race.

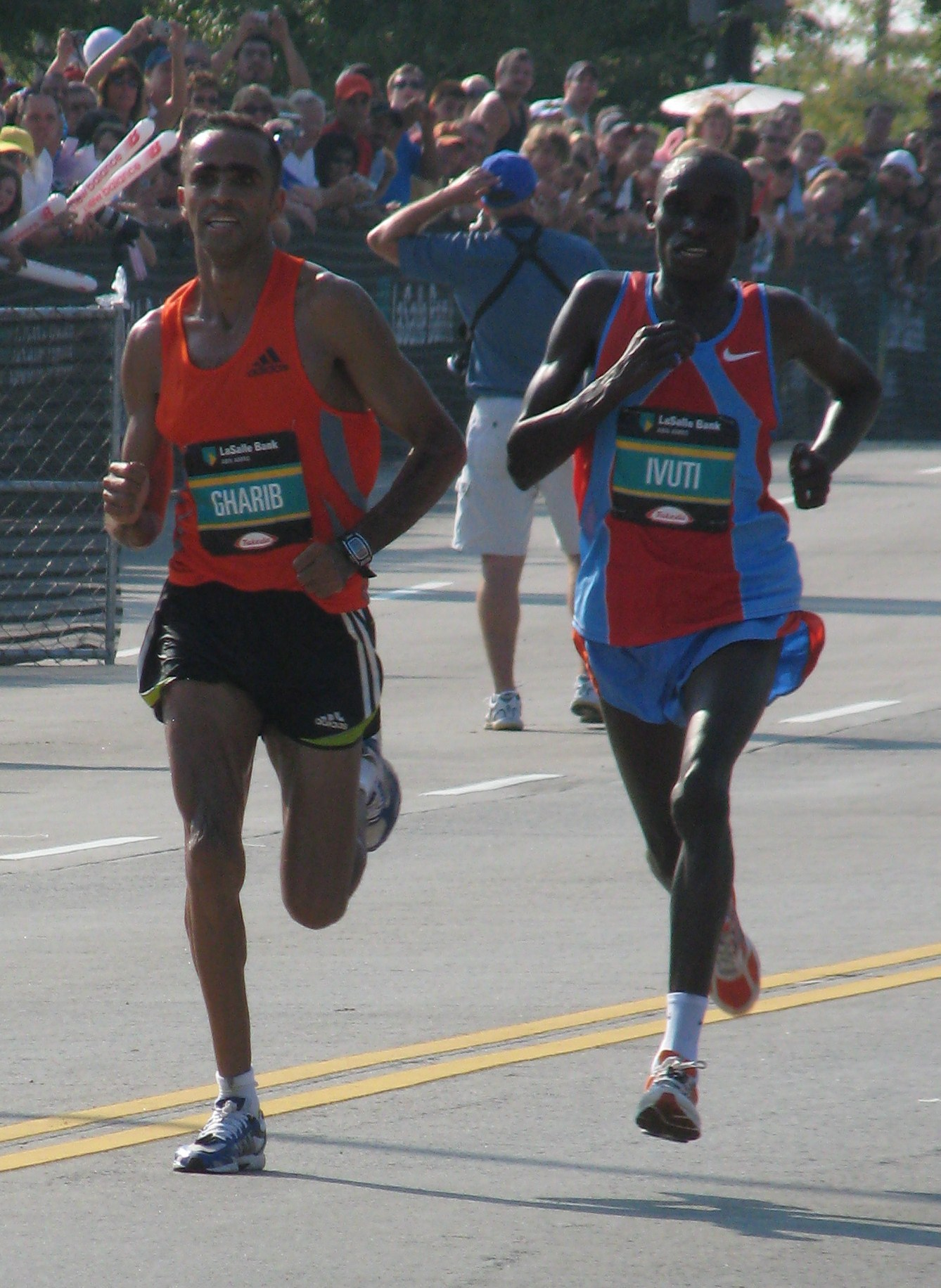
Gharib and Patrick Ivuti in a sprint finish at the 2007 Chicago Marathon

He repeated his approach to the season in 2005 by starting at the Lisbon Half Marathon and he finished sixth on this occasion. He ran sub-2:08 at the London Marathon for a second time and improved one place from the previous year, finishing as runner-up behind Martin Lel. His focus of the year was a defence of his title at the 2005 World Championships in Athletics. He returned home to Morocco and trained at altitude in the Atlas Mountains region. The move proved fruitful as, in spite of a sleepless night and stomach pains during the competition, he won the world championship marathon with an eleven-second margin over runner-up Christopher Isengwe. This made him only the second runner ever to retain the world marathon title, after Spaniard Abel Antón.

With no major competition to work towards in 2006, he focused on competing on the circuit. He finished the London Marathon in a time of 2:08:45 – the third fastest run of his career at that point – but this was only enough for eighth in a fast race which saw him beaten by compatriot Hicham Chatt. After a fourth-place finish at the Great North Run, his next marathon race came at the Fukuoka Marathon in Japan. Gharib came close to a career best, crossing the line in 2:07:19, and took third place on the podium behind Haile Gebrselassie and Dmytro Baranovskyy.

=== Olympic silver ===
He had his third sub-2:08 clocking at the London Marathon in 2007, recording 2:07:54 for fourth place. At the Chicago Marathon later that year he came close to victory but a photo finish between Gharib and Patrick Ivuti resulted in the Moroccan being declared the runner-up. Gharib won the silver medal in the 2008 Summer Olympics marathon held in Beijing, China, giving him his first Olympic medal. Gharib improved his personal best to 2:05:27 at the 2009 London Marathon, finishing in third place. He also finished in third place at the 2009 NYC Marathon.

Running in the 2010 London Marathon, he had to endure stomach problems but still made the podium, coming home in another third-place finish with a time of 2:06:55. He took third place at the Great North Run half marathon in September. He was victorious at the Fukuoka Marathon in December, completing a solo run on the hot course to win in a time of 2:08:24. The 2011 London Marathon was a particularly fast race and his time of 2:08:26 left him in sixth and almost four minutes behind winner Emmanuel Mutai.

== Achievements ==
=== Personal bests ===
Updated 26 April 2009

Event	Time	Date	Location
5000 metres	13:19.69	13 July 2001	Oslo
10,000 metres	27:29.51	18 June 2001	Prague
Half Marathon	59:59	22 March 2009	Lisbon
Marathon	2:05:27	26 April 2009	London

All Information taken from IAAF profile.

=== Competition record ===
Year	Competition	Venue	Position	Event	Notes
2001	World Championships	Edmonton, Canada	11th	10,000 m	28:05.45
2001	Mediterranean Games	Radès, Tunisia	1st	10,000 m	28:58.97
2001	World Half Marathon Championships	Bristol, England	9th	Half marathon	1:01:41
2002	World Cross Country Championships	Dublin, Ireland	10th	Long race	35:57
2002	World Cross Country Championships	Dublin, Ireland	3rd	Team race	9th
2002	World Half Marathon Championships	Brussels, Belgium	2nd	Half marathon	1:00:42
2002	African Championships	Radès, Tunisia	8th	10,000 m	28:57.12
2003	Rotterdam Marathon	Rotterdam, Netherlands	6th	Marathon	2:09:14
2003	2003 World Championships in Athletics	Paris, France	1st	Marathon	2:08:31
2004	London Marathon	London, United Kingdom	3rd	Marathon	2:07:02
2004	Olympic Games	Athens, Greece	11th	Marathon	2:15:12
2005	London Marathon	London, United Kingdom	2nd	Marathon	2:07:49
2005	2005 World Championships in Athletics	Helsinki, Finland	1st	Marathon	2:10:10
2006	London Marathon	London, United Kingdom	8th	Marathon	2:08:45
2006	Fukuoka Marathon	Fukuoka, Japan	3rd	Marathon	2:07:49
2007	London Marathon	London, United Kingdom	4th	Marathon	2:07:54
2007	Chicago Marathon	Chicago, United States	2nd	Marathon	2:11:11
2008	Olympic Games	Beijing, China	2nd	Marathon	2:07:16
2009	London Marathon	London, United Kingdom	3rd	Marathon	2:05:27
2009	New York City Marathon	New York City, United States	3rd	Marathon	2:10:25
2010	London Marathon	London, United Kingdom	3rd	Marathon	2:06:55
2010	Fukuoka Marathon	Fukuoka, Japan	1st	Marathon	2:08:24
2011	London Marathon	London, United Kingdom	6th	Marathon	2:08:26
2011	New York City Marathon	New York City, United States	5th	Marathon	2:08:26
2012	London Marathon	London, United Kingdom	4th	Marathon	2:07:44
2013	Orlen Warsaw Marathon	Warsaw, Poland	3rd	Marathon	2:10:11

- 2003 World Championships in Athletics - gold medal
- 2003 IAAF World Indoor Championships - 12th place (3000 m)
- 2004 Olympic Games - 11th place
- 2005 World Championships in Athletics - gold medal
- 2008 Olympic Games - silver medal (marathon)
