= 2003 World Championships in Athletics – Men's marathon =

The men's marathon at the 2003 World Championships in Paris, France, was held on Saturday, August 30, 2003.

== Medalists ==
Gold	Jaouad Gharib; Morocco (MAR)
Silver	Julio Rey; Spain (ESP)
Bronze	Stefano Baldini; Italy (ITA)

== Abbreviations ==
- All times shown are in hours:minutes:seconds

DNS	did not start
NM	no mark
WR	world record
AR	area record
NR	national record
PB	personal best
SB	season best

== Records ==
Standing records prior to the 2003 World Athletics Championships
World record	Khalid Khannouchi (USA)	2:05:38	April 14, 2002	London, United Kingdom
Event record	Robert de Castella (AUS)	2:10:03	August 14, 1983	Helsinki, Finland
Season best	Michael Kosgei Rotich (KEN)	2:06:33	April 6, 2003	Paris, France
Broken records at the 2003 World Athletics Championships
Event record	Jaouad Gharib (MAR)	2:08:31	August 30, 2003	Paris, France

== Intermediates ==
Rank	Number	Athlete	Time
5 kilometres
1	25	João N'Tyamba (ANG)	15:00
2	1268	Viktor Röthlin (SUI)	15:01
3	403	Julio Rey (ESP)	15:01
4	798	Frederick Cherono (KEN)	15:05
5	430	Moges Taye (ETH)	15:05
10 kilometres
1	796	Christopher Cheboiboch (KEN)	30:20
2	25	João N'Tyamba (ANG)	30:20
3	403	Julio Rey (ESP)	30:20
4	818	Michael Kosgei Rotich (KEN)	30:20
5	1120	Ahmed Adam Saleh (QAT)	30:21
15 kilometres
1	818	Michael Kosgei Rotich (KEN)	45:40
2	796	Christopher Cheboiboch (KEN)	45:40
3	403	Julio Rey (ESP)	45:40
4	834	Lee Bong-Ju (KOR)	45:40
5	1120	Ahmed Adam Saleh (QAT)	45:40
20 kilometres
1	798	Frederick Cherono (KEN)	1:01:34
2	912	Jaouad Gharib (MAR)	1:01:36
3	432	Ambesse Tolosa (ETH)	1:01:36
4	834	Lee Bong-Ju (KOR)	1:01:36
5	387	Alejandro Gómez (ESP)	1:01:36
Half marathon
1	798	Frederick Cherono (KEN)	1:04:45
2	431	Dawit Tefera (ETH)	1:04:45
3	818	Michael Kosgei Rotich (KEN)	1:04:45
4	19	Rachid Ziar (ALG)	1:04:46
5	403	Julio Rey (ESP)	1:04:46
25 kilometres
1	403	Julio Rey (ESP)	1:17:07
2	494	Larbi Zeroual (FRA)	1:17:07
3	834	Lee Bong-Ju (KOR)	1:17:07
4	912	Jaouad Gharib (MAR)	1:17:07
5	917	Khalid Skah (MAR)	1:17:07
30 kilometres
1	19	Rachid Ziar (ALG)	1:32:32
2	818	Michael Kosgei Rotich (KEN)	1:32:32
3	912	Jaouad Gharib (MAR)	1:32:32
4	403	Julio Rey (ESP)	1:32:32
5	395	José Manuel Martínez (ESP)	1:32:32
35 kilometres
1	912	Jaouad Gharib (MAR)	1:47:16
2	818	Michael Kosgei Rotich (KEN)	1:47:16
3	403	Julio Rey (ESP)	1:47:17
4	688	Stefano Baldini (ITA)	1:47:30
5	692	Daniele Caimmi (ITA)	1:47:30
40 kilometres
1	912	Jaouad Gharib (MAR)	2:02:05
2	403	Julio Rey (ESP)	2:02:05
3	688	Stefano Baldini (ITA)	2:02:42
4	818	Michael Kosgei Rotich (KEN)	2:02:43
5	756	Shigeru Aburaya (JPN)	2:02:46

== Final ranking ==
Rank	Athlete	Time	Note
1st place, gold medalist(s)	Jaouad Gharib (MAR)	2:08:31	CR
2nd place, silver medalist(s)	Julio Rey (ESP)	2:08:38	
3rd place, bronze medalist(s)	Stefano Baldini (ITA)	2:09:14	
4	Alberto Chaíça (POR)	2:09:25	PB
5	Shigeru Aburaya (JPN)	2:09:26	SB
6	Daniele Caimmi (ITA)	2:09:29	SB
7	Ian Syster (RSA)	2:10:17	
8	Michael Kosgei Rotich (KEN)	2:10:35	
9	Hendrick Ramaala (RSA)	2:10:37	
10	Atsushi Sato (JPN)	2:10:38	
11	Lee Bong-ju (KOR)	2:10:38	
12	Tsuyoshi Ogata (JPN)	2:10:39	SB
13	Rachid Ghanmouni (MAR)	2:10:56	PB
14	Viktor Rothlin (SUI)	2:11:14	
15	Samson Ramadhani (TAN)	2:11:21	
16	José Manuel Martínez (ESP)	2:11:31	
17	Lee Troop (AUS)	2:11:46	
18	Rachid Ziar (ALG)	2:11:58	SB
19	Ambesse Tolosa (ETH)	2:12:19	SB
20	Luc Krotwaar (NED)	2:12:28	SB
21	Koji Shimizu (JPN)	2:13:19	
22	Alberico di Cecco (ITA)	2:13:36	
23	Ruggero Pertile (ITA)	2:13:45	
24	Nikolaos Polias (GRE)	2:13:53	PB
25	Larbi Zeroual (FRA)	2:14:29	
26	Ashebir Demissie (ETH)	2:14:32	
27	Asaf Bimro (ISR)	2:14:52	NR
28	Juan Carlos Cardona (COL)	2:14:52	
29	Joachim Nshimirimana (BDI)	2:14:57	SB
30	Gert Thys (RSA)	2:15:00	
31	Al Mustafa Riyadh (BHR)	2:15:20	NR
32	Kevin Collins (USA)	2:15:38	
33	Karl Johan Rasmussen (NOR)	2:16:00	SB
34	Abdelhakim Bagy (FRA)	2:16:06	
35	Andrew Letherby (AUS)	2:16:12	SB
36	Antoni Bernadó (AND)	2:16:19	
37	Ahmed Adam Saleh (QAT)	2:16:31	NR
38	Khalid Skah (MAR)	2:16:34	PB
39	Clinton Verran (USA)	2:16:42	
40	Lee Myong-seung (KOR)	2:16:46	
41	Roderic de Highden (AUS)	2:16:56	
42	Philippe Rémond (FRA)	2:17:35	SB
43	Dawit Terefa (ETH)	2:17:53	
44	Yusuf Zepak (TUR)	2:18:02	PB
45	Ernest Ndjissipou (CAF)	2:18:06	NR
46	Mytahar Echchadi (MAR)	2:18:12	
47	Keith Dowling (USA)	2:18:17	SB
48	Alberto Juzdado (ESP)	2:18:34	
49	Mathias Ntawulikura (RWA)	2:18:44	
50	Jose Ernani Palalia (MEX)	2:20:03	
51	Nicholas Harrison (AUS)	2:20:16	
52	Ji Young-jun (KOR)	2:20:21	
53	Migidio Bourifa (ITA)	2:21:12	
54	Carlos Grisales (COL)	2:22:34	SB
55	Shane Nankervis (AUS)	2:23:12	
56	Vasiliy Medvedev (UZB)	2:23:38	PB
57	Foaad Ali Abubaker (QAT)	2:23:40	PB
58	Julián Berrio (COL)	2:24:03	
59	Roman Kejžar (SLO)	2:24:20	
60	Driss El Himer (FRA)	2:24:23	
61	Jumah Omar Al-Noor (QAT)	2:24:33	PB
62	John Nada Saya (TAN)	2:25:49	SB
63	Ser-Od Bat-Ochir (MGL)	2:26:39	NR
64	Jimmy Hearld (USA)	2:26:59	PB
65	Jussi Utriainen (FIN)	2:29:03	PB
66	Francisco Javier Cortés (ESP)	2:29:53	
67	Mpesela Ntlot'soeu (LES)	2:30:44	SB
68	Sokhibdjon Sharipov (TJK)	2:31:29	PB
69	Carlos Almeida (CPV)	2:33:31	PB
Did not finish (DNF)
—	Alejandro Gomez (ESP)	DNF	
—	Haile Satayin (ISR)	DNF	
—	Tereje Wodajo (ETH)	DNF	
—	Tobias Hiskia (NAM)	DNF	
—	Frederick Cherono (KEN)	DNF	
—	Omar Daher Ghadid (DJI)	DNF	
—	Joao N'Tyamba (ANG)	DNF	
—	Ezael Thlobo (RSA)	DNF	
—	Josia Thugwane (RSA)	DNF	
—	Ambrose Makau (KEN)	DNF	
—	Kemal Tuwaklyyew (TKM)	DNF	
—	Matt O'Dowd (GBR)	DNF	
—	William Kiplagat (KEN)	DNF	
—	Kim Yi-yong (KOR)	DNF	
—	Gezahegne Abera (ETH)	DNF	
—	El-Mostafa Damaoui (MAR)	DNF	
—	Moges Taye (ETH)	DNF	
—	Zebedayo Bayo (TAN)	DNF	
—	Christopher Cheboiboch (KEN)	DNF	
—	Ryan Shay (USA)	DNF	
Did not start (DNS)
—	Papy Ilunga (COD)	DNS	
—	Mwenze Kalombo (COD)	DNS	
—	Alain Nkulu (COD)	DNS	
—	Leonard NtalaMeso (COD)	DNS	
—	Benoît Zwierzchiewski (FRA)	DNS	

== See also ==
- Athletics at the 2003 Pan American Games – Men's marathon
- 2003 World Marathon Cup
- Athletics at the 2004 Summer Olympics – Men's marathon
