= Burmakin =

Burmakin (Russian: Бурмакин), female Burmakina, is a surname. Notable people with the surname include:

- Vladimir Burmakin (born 1967), Russian chess grandmaster
- Dmitriy Burmakin (born 1981), Russian long-distance runner
