= Dmitry Safronov =

Russian marathon runner

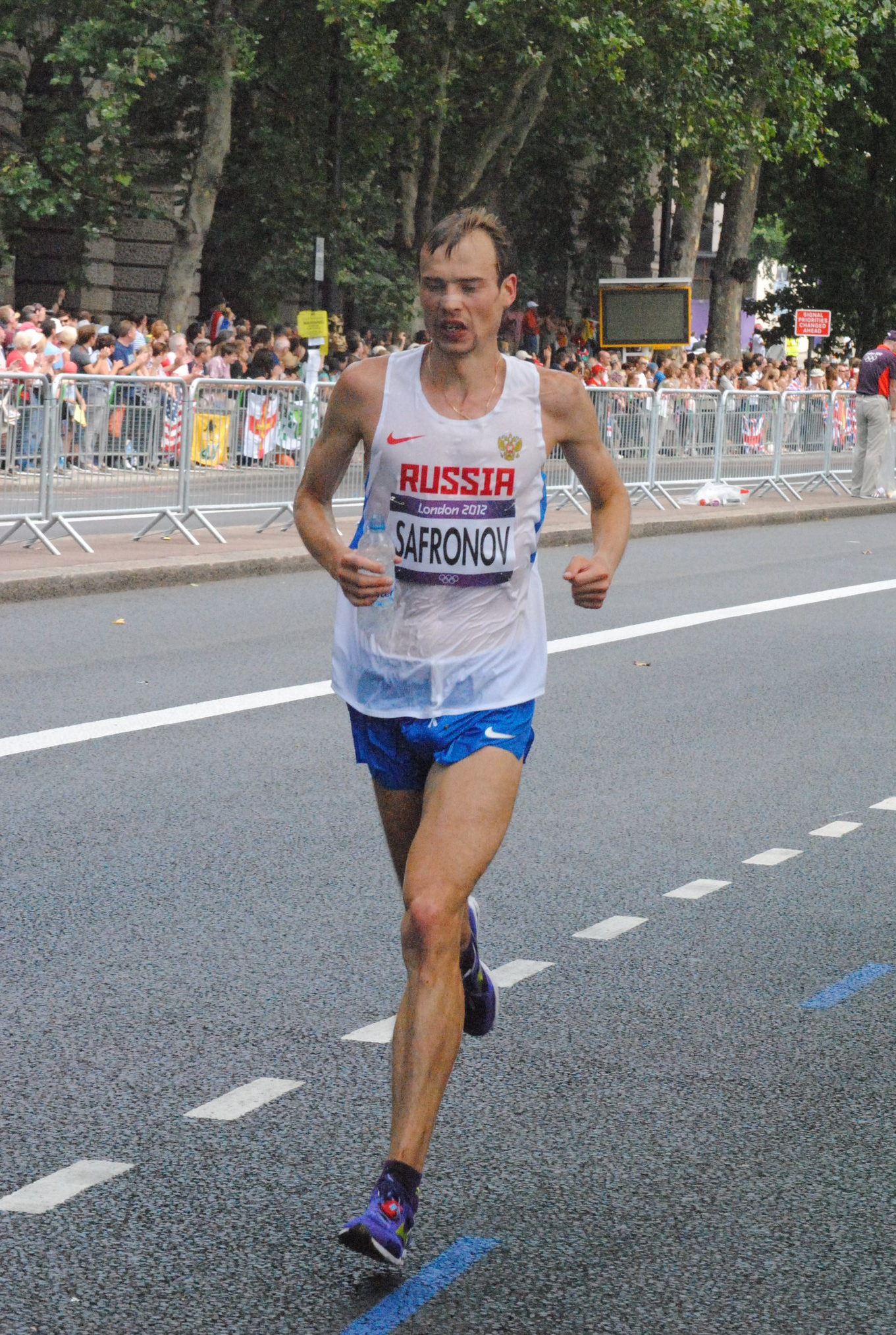
- Safronov in the middle of the 2012 Olympic Marathon

Personal information
- Born: October 9, 1981 (age 44)
- Height: 1.89 m (6 ft 2 1/2 in)
- Weight: 73 kg (161 lb)

Sport
- Country: Russia
- Sport: Athletics
- Event: Marathon
Medal record
European Championships
Bronze medal – third place	2010 Barcelona	Marathon

Dmitriy Olegovich Safronov (Russian: Дмитрий Олегович Сафронов) (born 8 October 1981) is a Russian long-distance runner who specialises in marathon running.

== Biography ==
He made his first appearance over the classic distance at the 2008 San Antonio Marathon in Texas, and finished third with a time of 2:15:58 for his debut run. He won his first marathon in October the following year – in only his second marathon, his winning time of 2:11:51 at the Podgorica Marathon was ten seconds off Petko Stefanov's long-standing course record.

He started his 2010 season at the Daegu Marathon, where his run of 2:12:55 brought him sixth place. Despite his relative inexperience over the distance, Safronov claimed the bronze medal in the marathon at the 2010 European Athletics Championships in Barcelona. In the later stages he overtook Ruggero Pertile (who suffered from cramps), and later said "I suffered a lot and it was a very tough race...At 30 km I realised I had a chance of a medal and I’m very proud of my last 2 km." An appearance at the Fukuoka Marathon in December resulted in a personal best run of 2:10:12 – by keeping his own tempered pace in the hot conditions, he managed to finish quickly and went from seventh to second place, taking the runner-up spot behind Jaouad Gharib.

He completed his first sub-2:10 performance at the 2011 London Marathon, taking eighth with his time of 2:09:35 hours. He was among the leaders at the 2011 Fukuoka Marathon and ended the race in fifth place.

He competed at the 2012 Summer Olympics, taking 23rd place in a time of 2:16:04.
