= 2002 European Cross Country Championships =

Coordinates: 44°48′27″N 13°57′19″E

- Organisers: EAA
- Edition: 9th
- Date: 8 December
- Host city: Medulin, Croatia
- Events: 4
- Distances: 9.83 km – Men; 6.17 km – Women; 6.17 km – Junior men 3.73 km – Junior women

The 9th European Cross Country Championships were held at Medulin in Croatia on 8 December 2002. Serhiy Lebid took his third title in the men's competition and Helena Javornik won the women's race.

== Results ==
=== Men individual 9.83 km ===
Pos.	Runners	Time
1st place, gold medalist(s)	(Ukraine) Serhiy Lebid	28:58
2nd place, silver medalist(s)	(France) Mustapha Essaïd	29:03
3rd place, bronze medalist(s)	(Spain) Fabián Roncero	29:03
4.	(Portugal) Eduardo Henriques	29:05
5.	(Portugal) Hélder Ornelas	29:08
6.	(Spain) Juan Carlos de la Ossa	29:10
7.	(Spain) Enrique Molina	29:12
8.	(Republic of Ireland) Alistair Cragg	29:13
9.	(Ukraine) Jevgeni Bozhko	29:18
10.	(Austria) Günther Weidlinger	29:21
11.	(Netherlands) Kamiel Maase	29:24
12.	(France) Loic Letellier	29:29

Total 86 competitors

=== Men teams ===
Pos.	Team	Points
1st place, gold medalist(s)	Spain; Fabián Roncero; Juan Carlos de la Ossa; Enrique Molina; José Manuel Martínez	31
2nd place, silver medalist(s)	France	43
3rd place, bronze medalist(s)	Portugal	57
4.	United Kingdom	93
5.	Ukraine	99
6.	Ireland	103
7.	Belgium	113
8.	Italy	129

Total 13 teams

=== Women individual 6.17 km ===
Pos.	Runners	Time
1st place, gold medalist(s)	(Slovenia) Helena Javornik	15:48
2nd place, silver medalist(s)	(Russia) Galina Bogomolova	15:49
3rd place, bronze medalist(s)	(Turkey) Elvan Abeylegesse	15:51
4.	(Hungary) Anikó Kálovics	15:52
5.	(United Kingdom) Hayley Tullett	15:55
6.	(Socialist Federal Republic of Yugoslavia) Sonja Stolić	15:55
7.	(France) Hafida Gadi	15:56
8.	(Hungary) Simona Staicu	15:58
9.	(Switzerland) Anita Weyermann	16:01
10.	(Russia) Anastasiya Zubova	16:03
11.	(Portugal) Inês Monteiro	16:05
12.	(Portugal) Analídia Torre	16:08

Total 78 competitors

=== Women teams ===
Pos.	Team	Points
1st place, gold medalist(s)	Russia; Galina Bogomolova; Anastasiya Zubova; Liliya Volkova; Olga Romanova	48
2nd place, silver medalist(s)	Portugal	54
3rd place, bronze medalist(s)	United Kingdom	80
4.	France	82
5.	Spain	116
6.	Ireland	133
7.	Poland	169
8.	Italy	179

Total 12 teams

=== Junior men individual 6.17 km ===
Pos.	Runners	Time
1st place, gold medalist(s)	(Russia) Yevgeniy Rybakov	18:16
2nd place, silver medalist(s)	(Russia) Anatoliy Rybakov	18:17
3rd place, bronze medalist(s)	(Turkey) Halil Akkaş	18:23
4.	(Belgium) Pieter Desmet	18:35
5.	(Italy) Stefano Scaini	18:36
6.	(France) Abdel Mahmoudi	18:38
7.	(Russia) Vladimir Ponomarev	18:38
8.	(France) Ian de Bondt	18:41

Total 93 competitors

=== Junior men teams ===
Pos.	Team	Points
1st place, gold medalist(s)	Russia; Yevgeniy Rybakov; Anatoliy Rybakov; Vladimir Ponomarev; Akmal Ishov	37
2nd place, silver medalist(s)	France	57
3rd place, bronze medalist(s)	Italy; Stefano Scaini; Stefano Cugusi; Dereje Rabattoni; Francesco Bona	92
4.	Romania	104
5.	Turkey	105
6.	Yugoslavia	109
7.	Spain	111
8.	United Kingdom	119

Total 18 teams

=== Junior women individual 3.73 km ===
Pos.	Runners	Time
1st place, gold medalist(s)	(United Kingdom) Charlotte Dale	12:26
2nd place, silver medalist(s)	(Finland) Elina Lindgren	12:27
3rd place, bronze medalist(s)	(Russia) Galina Yegorova	12:28
4.	(Russia) Tatyana Petrova	12:29
5.	(Netherlands) Adrienne Herzog	12:30
6.	(Turkey) Asly Cakyr	12:38
7.	(United Kingdom) Freya Murray	12:40
8.	(United Kingdom) Danielle Barnes	12:40

Total 93 competitors

=== Junior women teams ===
Pos.	Team	Points
1st place, gold medalist(s)	United Kingdom; Charlotte Dale; Freya Murray; Danielle Barnes; Rachael Nathan	27
2nd place, silver medalist(s)	Russia	35
3rd place, bronze medalist(s)	Belgium	105
4.	Netherlands	109
5.	Turkey	117
6.	Ukraine	131
7.	Hungary	138
8.	Germany	144

Total 17 teams
