= Michael Rotich =

Kenyan middle-distance runner

not to be confused with Kenyan marathon runner Michael Kosgei Rotich

Michael Rotich (born July 14, 1978, in Kimowo) is a runner from Kenya.

Rotich won bronze at the 2003 Military World Games Catania, Italy He competed at the 2004 Summer Olympics in Athens, Greece, taking part in the 800 metres race, finishing 5th in his heat and did not advance to the semifinals. His personal best is 1:44.09 minutes, achieved in 2004 in Iraklio, Greece.
