= Rachid Ghanmouni =

Moroccan long-distance runner

Rachid Ghanmouni (born 10 April 1978) is a Moroccan long-distance runner.

He was born in Rich, Errachidia. He finished thirteenth in the marathon race at the 2003 World Championships in a personal best time of 2:10:56 hours. He also competed at the 2004 Olympic Games, but did not finish. He finished 27th at the 2003 World Half Marathon Championships and 34th at the 2004 World Half Marathon Championships.

His personal best times are 2:09:11 in the marathon, achieved in April 2006 in the Paris Marathon; and 1:01:36 hours in the half marathon, achieved in April 2003 in Safi.

In October 2006 he was to be tested for doping in Formiguères, but fled from the site. He was subject to a two-year suspension in January 2008, and after he lost a legal battle the suspension was upheld. The suspension expired in March 2010.

== Achievements ==
- All results regarding marathon, unless stated otherwise

Year	Competition	Venue	Position	Notes
Representing Morocco
2002	Casablanca Marathon	Casablanca, Morocco	1st	2:12:21
2003	World Championships	Paris, France	13th	2:10:56
2004	Olympic Games	Athens, Greece	—	DNF
2005	Valencia Marathon	Valencia, Spain	1st	2:14:03
2006	Paris Marathon	Paris, France	6th	2:09:11
2007	Amsterdam Marathon	Amsterdam, Netherlands	DQed	suspended
2011	Lyon Marathon	Lyon, France	1st	2:23:14
