= Henryk Szost =

Polish long-distance runner

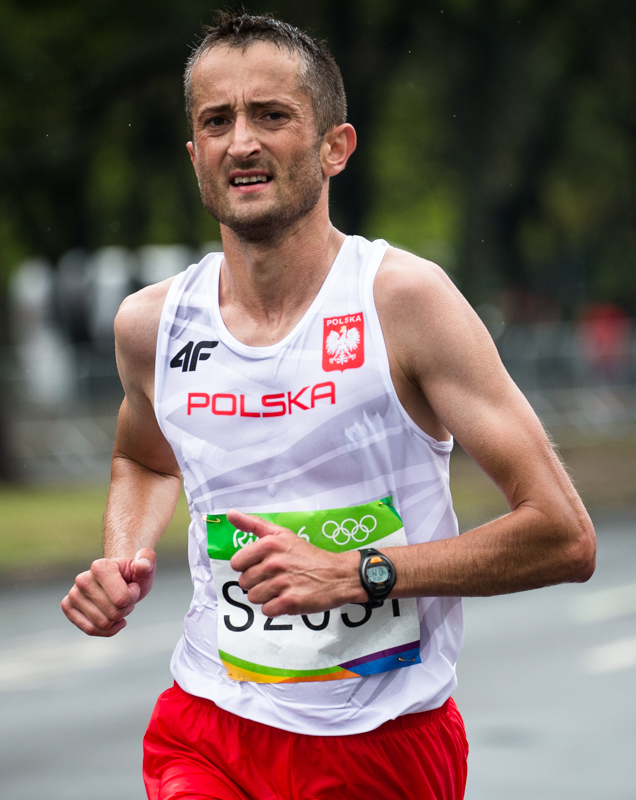
- Szost at the 2016 Summer Olympics

Personal information
- Full name: Henryk Józef Szost
- Nationality: Poland
- Born: 20 January 1982 (age 44) Krynica Zdrój, Poland
- Height: 1.85 m (6 ft 1 in)
- Weight: 68 kg (150 lb)

Sport
- Sport: Athletics
- Event: Marathon
- Club: WKS Grunwald Poznań
- Coached by: Leonid Shvetsov (2010–2015); Zbigniew Król (2015–)

Henryk Szost (born 20 January 1982 in Krynica Zdrój) is a Polish long-distance runner who competes in the marathon.

He twice competed in the marathon at the Olympics. He finished 34th in 2008 at the Beijing Games and 9th in 2012 at the London Games.

He competed at the 2010 European Athletics Championships, but dropped out of the race. His personal best time of 2:07:39 hours set in 2012 is the Polish record for the event.

In 2012 he was runner-up at the Lake Biwa Marathon and came third at the Fukuoka Marathon.

== Achievements ==
Year	Competition	Venue	Position	Event	Notes
Representing Poland
2006	World Road Running Championships	Debrecen, Hungary	38th	20 km	1:00:51
2008	Olympic Games	Beijing, China	34th	Marathon	2:19:43
2010	European Championships	Barcelona, Spain	–	Marathon	DNF
2012	Olympic Games	London, United Kingdom	9th	Marathon	2:12:28
