= Tekle Muluat =

Ethiopian long-distance runner

Personal information
- Nationality: Ethiopian
- Born: Tekle Muluat; 2 December 2004 (age 21) Ethiopia
- Occupation: long-distance runner
- Years active: 2023–present

Sport
- Country: Ethiopia
- Sport: Athletics
- Event(s): Half marathon, 10 km

Achievements and titles
- Personal bests: Half marathon: 1:06:53 (2024); 10 km: 32:37 (2024)
Medal record
Athletics
Representing Ethiopia
Gold medal – first place	2024 Berlin Half Marathon	Half marathon

Tekle Muluat (born 2 December 2004) is an Ethiopian long-distance runner specializing in road racing. She won the 2024 Berlin Half Marathon.

== Career ==
Tekle Muluat began competing internationally in 2023. Her first notable international result was at the 2023 Lisbon Half Marathon, where she finished 6th with a time of 1:09:12. She also competed at the 2024 Roma-Ostia Half Marathon, finishing second with a personal best time of 1:07:41. In April 2024, at just 19 years old, she secured a major victory at the Berlin Half Marathon with a time of 1:06:53.

Her personal bests include 1:06:53 for the half marathon (set at the 2024 Berlin Half Marathon) and 32:37 for the 10K road race.

== Achievements ==
Year	Race	Place	Position	Time
2023	Lisbon Half Marathon	Lisbon	6th	1:09:12
2024	Roma-Ostia Half Marathon	Rome	2nd	1:07:41
2024	Berlin Half Marathon	Berlin	1st	1:06:53
