= Luís Novo =

Portuguese long-distance runner

Personal information
- Born: May 29, 1970 (age 56) Oliveira do Bairro, Portugal

Sport
- Sport: Marathon running

Luís Azevedo da Silva Novo (born May 29, 1970) is a male long-distance runner from Portugal, who won the 2001 edition of the Vienna Marathon, clocking 2:10.28. He ended up in fourth place in the men's marathon at the 1999 World Championships.

He set het personal best time (2:09.41) in 2002 at the Berlin Marathon, when he finished in seventh place. Novo represented his native country at the 2000 Summer Olympics in Sydney, Australia, finishing in 50th place.

== Achievements ==
Year	Competition	Venue	Position	Event	Notes
Representing Portugal
1997	Universiade	Catania, Italy	6th	10,000 m	28:39.64
1998	Paris Marathon	Paris, France	27th	Marathon	
1998	Reims Marathon	Reims, France	2nd	Marathon	2:10:32
1999	World Championships	Seville, Spain	4th	Marathon	2:14:27
2000	Rotterdam Marathon	Rotterdam, Netherlands	13th	Marathon	2:11:29
2000	Olympic Games	Sydney, Australia	50th	Marathon	2:23:04
2001	World Championships	Edmonton, Canada	—	Marathon	DNF
2001	Vienna Marathon	Vienna, Austria	1st	Marathon	2:10:28
2002	Beppu-Ōita Marathon	Beppu-Ōita, Japan	9th	Marathon	2:19:35
2004	Berlin Marathon	Berlin, Germany	7th	Marathon	2:09:41
2005	World Championships	Helsinki, Finland	24th	Marathon	2:18:36
2006	European Championships	Gothenburg, Sweden	—	Marathon	DNF
2006	Berlin Marathon	Berlin, Germany	19th	Marathon	2:22:51
