= 2024 Ljubljana Marathon =

Marathon race edition

28th Ljubljana marathon at the 28th Ljubljana Marathon
- Venue: Ljubljana Streets
- Location: Ljubljana, Slovenia
- Dates: October 20, 2024 (12 months ago)
- Competitors: 24,675 (Total); 15,267 (Sunday); 9,358 (Saturday) from 86 nations
- Website: https://ljubljanskimaraton.si/en/

The 2024 Ljubljana Marathon was the 28th edition of the annual marathon race in Ljubljana held on Sunday, October 20, 2024. A total of 24,675 competitors registered for all weekend events, and 15,267 competitors from a record 86 countries for the main events.

For the main Sunday event, a record 5,092 foreign runners from record 86 countries registered.

== Schedule ==
=== Saturday events ===
- 10:00 am (CET) – "Lumpi" Kids Run (200 m)
- 11:20 am (CET) – Promotional Gold Ribbon Run (500 m)
- 11:35 am (CET) – Promotional 1st to 2nd Grade School Run (500 m)
- 12:10 am (CET) – Promotional 3rd to 5th Grade School Run (1,000 m)
- 12:45 pm (CET) – Promotional 6th to 9th Grade School Run (1,500 m)
- 3:00 pm (CET) – High School Run (2,800 m)

=== Sunday events ===
- 8:00 am (CET) – 10K run (6,148 runners)
- 9:00 am (CET) – Half marathon (6,238 runners)
- 9:00 am (CET) – Marathon (2,881 runners)

== Results ==
=== Men (42 km) ===
Rank	Athlete	Nationality	Time
1	Getaneh Molla	Ethiopia	02:06:29
2	Edmond Kipngetich	Kenya	02:07:03
3	Collins Kipkorir	Kenya	02:07:28
4	Berhane Tesfay Berhe	Eritrea	02:07:31
5	Kipkemoi Kiprono	Kenya	02:08:00
6	Tadesse Yohans Mekasha	Ethiopia	02:12:31
7	Kibrom Desta Habtu	Kenya	02:15:33
8	Primož Kobe	Slovenia	02:18:21
9	Matic Modic	Slovenia	02:24:09
10	Domen Hafner	Slovenia	02:24:19

=== Women (42 km) ===
Rank	Athlete	Nationality	Time
1	Joyce Chepkemoi Tele	Kenya	02:20:17
2	Mulu Demissie Gadise	Ethiopia	02:20:59
3	Gerado Senbeta Zinash	Ethiopia	02:24:04
4	Niguse Mamo Emebet	Ethiopia	02:25:25
5	Aberta Sadura Adawork	Ethiopia	02:30:15
6	Fink Malenšek Anja	Slovenia	02:39:10
7	Pisk Saša	Slovenia	02:46:12
8	Neja Kršinar	Slovenia	02:47:40
9	Nina Gubanc	Slovenia	02:51:32
10	Katarina Pišotek	Slovenia	02:59:14

=== Men (21 km) ===
Rank	Athlete	Nationality	Time
1	Jakob Medved	Slovenia	01:07:16
2	Mitja Krevs	Slovenia	01:07:39
3	Timotej Bečan	Slovenia	01:09:19
4	Vinzent Klaus	Austria	01:09:47
5	Klemen Vilhar	Slovenia	01:10:18
6	Grega Šetrajčič	Slovenia	01:10:29
7	Janez Mulej	Slovenia	01:11:54
8	Andrii Onyshchenko	Austria	01:12:53
9	Nil Kerin	Slovenia	01:12:54
10	Žan Čeplak	Slovenia	01:13:00

=== Women (21 km) ===
Rank	Athlete	Nationality	Time
1	Liza Šajn	Slovenia	01:12:17
2	Jasmina Pitmic Vojska	Slovenia	01:18:20
3	Nuša Mali	Slovenia	01:22:31
4	Dr. Rozsnyai Lilla	Hungary	01:23:30
5	Greta Pizzolato	France	01:24:22
6	Katarina Keti Pohlod	Serbia	01:25:54
7	Breda Škedelj	Slovenia	01:26:50
8	Eva Dimc	Slovenia	01:27:36
9	Katja Juhart	Slovenia	01:28:28
10	Wiltrud Rieberer Murer	Austria	01:28:36
