= 2006 European Athletics Championships – Men's 10,000 metres =

Men's 10,000 metres at the 2006 European Athletics Championships
- Venue: Ullevi Stadium
- Location: Gothenburg, Sweden
- Dates: 8 August 2006
- Competitors: 18 from 12 nations
- Winning time: 28:10.94

Medalists
gold medal	Jan Fitschen	Germany
silver medal	José Manuel Martínez	Spain
bronze medal	Juan Carlos de la Ossa	Spain

The men's 10,000 metres at the 2006 European Athletics Championships were held at the Ullevi on August 8.

After an attempted breakaway started by Swiss Christian Belz with one and a half laps to go, Martínez and de la Ossa caught up with him, with German Fitschen falling away but catching up again before the final curve. He then outsprinted the two Spaniards to take "shock" gold.

== Medalists ==
Gold	Silver	Bronze
Jan Fitschen; Germany	José Manuel Martínez; Spain	Juan Carlos de la Ossa; Spain

== Schedule ==
Date	Time	Round
August 8, 2006	20:20	Final

== Results ==
=== Final ===
Rank	Name	Nationality	Time	Notes
1st place, gold medalist(s)	Jan Fitschen	Germany	28:10.94	PB
2nd place, silver medalist(s)	José Manuel Martínez	Spain	28:12.06	SB
3rd place, bronze medalist(s)	Juan Carlos de la Ossa	Spain	28:13.73	
4	Christian Belz	Switzerland	28:16.93	
5	Serhiy Lebid	Ukraine	28:19.14	
6	Dmitry Maksimov	Russia	28:20.43	SB
7	André Pollmächer	Germany	28:22.56	PB
8	Driss El Himer	France	28:30.09	
9	Ricardo Serrano	Spain	28:38.40	
10	Daniele Meucci	Italy	28:48.30	
11	Martin Fagan	Ireland	28:54.04	
12	José Ramos	Portugal	28:55.45	
13	Mokhtar Benhari	France	28:56.07	
14	Slavko Petrović	Croatia	28:56.66	SB
15	Willem Van Hoof	Belgium	28:57.11	
16	Jesse Stroobants	Belgium	28:59.91	
17	Monder Rizki	Belgium	29:13.62	
18	Michał Kaczmarek	Poland	30:14.37	
