= Gudisa Shentema =

Ethiopian long-distance runner

Gudisa Shentema (Amharic: ጉድሳ ሸንተማ; born 19 April 1980 in Ambo) is an Ethiopian long-distance runner who specializes in the marathon.

He won a bronze medal at the 2003 All-Africa Games and finished thirteenth at the 2005 World Championships. He also competed at the 2007 World Championships, but did not finish the race.

His personal best time is 2:07:34 hours, achieved in April 2008 at the Paris Marathon. In the half marathon his personal best time is 1:02:23 hours, achieved in September 2005 in Philadelphia.

After a two-year break from the marathon distance, he made a winning return at the inaugural Haile Gebrselassie Marathon in Ethiopia.

== Achievements ==
Year	Competition	Venue	Position	Event	Notes
Representing Ethiopia
2003	All-Africa Games	Abuja, Nigeria	3rd	Marathon	2:27:39
