= Athletics at the 1997 Summer Universiade – Men's 10,000 metres =

The men's 10,000 metres event at the 1997 Summer Universiade was held on 30 August at the Stadio Cibali in Catania, Italy.

== Results ==
Rank	Athlete	Nationality	Time	Notes
1st place, gold medalist(s)	Kamiel Maase	Netherlands	28:22.11	
2nd place, silver medalist(s)	Dan Browne	United States	28:27.64	
3rd place, bronze medalist(s)	Rachid Berradi	Italy	28:30.05	
4	Pedro Trejo	Spain	28:31.38	
5	Thorsten Naumann	Germany	28:38.48	
6	Luís Novo	Portugal	28:39.64	
7	Naoki Mishiro	Japan	28:41.12	
8	Mohamed Afaadas	Morocco	28:43.81	
9	Stephen Mayaka	Kenya	28:55.76	
10	Wataru Kobayashi	Japan	29:07.59	
11	Dragoslav Prpa	FR Yugoslavia	29:32.88	
12	Steve Isbel	Australia	29:50.72	
13	Ted Fitzpatrick	United States	29:56.89	
14	Mehmet Kara	Turkey	29:57.65	
15	Craig Kirkwood	New Zealand	29:58.52	
16	Wellington Fraga	Brazil	30:46.61	
17	Timon Gunen	Nigeria	31:14.85	
18	Jean-Claude Minani	Burundi	33:15.51	
	Fidele Baregensabe	Burundi	DNF	
	Mark Saina	Kenya	DNF	
	Aziz Driouche	Morocco	DNF	
	Jan Erik Christiansen	Norway	DNF	
	Themba Nchefu	South Africa	DNF	
