= Jan Fitschen =

German long-distance runner (born 1977)

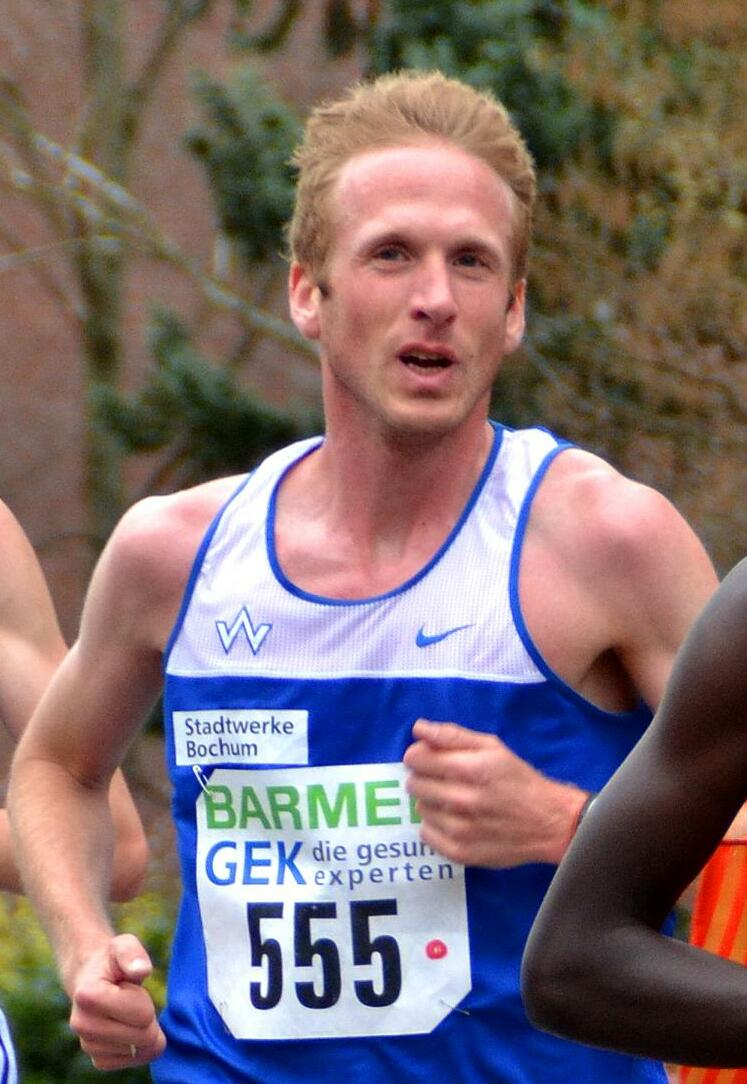
- Fitschen in 2013

Personal information
- Born: 2 May 1977 (age 49) Nordhorn, West Germany

Sport
- Sport: Long-distance running
Medal record
Representing Germany
Men's Athletics
European Championships
Gold medal – first place	2006 Gothenburg	10,000 m
Summer Universiade
Gold medal – first place	2003 Daegu	10,000 m
Silver medal – second place	2003 Daegu	5000m

Jan Gerrit Fitschen (born 2 May 1977) is a German long-distance runner, competing for TV Wattenscheid 01.

At the 1999 Under 23 European Championships he finished fifth over the 5000 metres. He was German champion over 5000 metres in 2001, 2002, 2005 and 2006 and over 10,000 m in 2005 and 2006.

Fitschen won the title of European Champion over 10,000 metres at the 2006 European Championships in Athletics in Gothenburg in a personal best at the time of 28:10.94. However, on 4 May 2008 in Palo Alto, California, he improved on his 10,000 m time with a personal best of 28:02.55.
