= 2006 European Athletics Championships – Men's marathon =

International sporting competition

Men's marathon at the European Athletics Championships

The men's marathon at the 2006 European Athletics Championships were held in Gothenburg, Sweden (at the Ullevi Stadium) on August 13.

2002 winner Janne Holmén finished in seventh place.

== Medalists ==
Gold	Silver	Bronze
Stefano Baldini; Italy	Viktor Röthlin; Switzerland	Julio Rey; Spain

== Schedule ==
Date	Time	Round
August 13, 2006	12:10	Final

== Final ranking ==
Rank	Name	Nationality	Time	Notes
1st place, gold medalist(s)	Stefano Baldini	Italy	2:11:32	
2nd place, silver medalist(s)	Viktor Röthlin	Switzerland	2:11:50	
3rd place, bronze medalist(s)	Julio Rey	Spain	2:12:37	
4	Luc Krotwaar	Netherlands	2:12:44	
5	Francesco Ingargiola	Italy	2:13:04	
6	Dmitriy Semyonov	Russia	2:13:09	
7	Janne Holmén	Finland	2:13:10	
8	Alberto Chaíça	Portugal	2:13:14	
9	Kamiel Maase	Netherlands	2:13:46	
10	Luís Jesus	Portugal	2:14:15	
11	Danilo Goffi	Italy	2:14:45	
12	Rafał Wójcik	Poland	2:14:58	
13	Dmitriy Burmakin	Russia	2:15:33	
14	Abdelhakim Bagy	France	2:15:54	
15	Hélder Ornelas	Portugal	2:16:03	
16	Dan Robinson	Great Britain	2:16:06	
17	Grigoriy Andreyev	Russia	2:16:36	
18	Seteng Ayele	Israel	2:17:04	
19	Sander Schutgens	Netherlands	2:17:11	PB
20	Huw Lobb	Great Britain	2:17:17	
21	David Ramard	France	2:17:23	
22	Hugo van den Broek	Netherlands	2:17:25	
23	Toni Bernado	Andorra	2:17:37	
24	Leonid Shvetsov	Russia	2:18:49	
25	Asaf Bimro	Israel	2:19:40	
26	Pavel Faschingbauer	Czech Republic	2:19:41	
27	Tomas Abyu	Great Britain	2:20:45	
28	Francis Kirwa	Finland	2:21:05	
29	Said Regraugui	Sweden	2:21:33	
30	Kamal Ziani	Spain	2:21:49	
31	Henrik Sandstad	Norway	2:22:10	
32	Andrey Chernysov	Russia	2:23:23	
33	Kristoffer Österlund	Sweden	2:23:26	
34	Wodage Zvadya	Israel	2:24:52	
35	Trond Idland	Norway	2:26:23	
36	Jaakko Kero	Finland	2:27:45	
37	Kristian Algers	Sweden	2:28:27	
38	Karl Johan Rasmussen	Norway	2:30:05	
39	Trpe Martinovski	Macedonia	2:54:46	
40	Tomislav Spasevski	Macedonia	3:04:38	
	Dastaho Svench	Israel	DNF	
	Luís Novo	Portugal	DNF	
	Ruggero Pertile	Italy	DNF	
	Paulo Gomes	Portugal	DNF	
	José Ríos	Spain	DNF	
	José Manuel Martínez	Spain	DNF	
	Giacomo Leone	Italy	DNF	
	António Sousa	Portugal	DNF	
	Peter Riley	Great Britain	DNF	
	Ottavio Andriani	Italy	DNF	
	Kent Claesson	Sweden	DNF	
	Marek Poszepczynski	Sweden	DNF	
	Tuomo Lehtinen	Finland	DNF	
	Benoît Zwierzchiewski	France	DNF	

== See also ==
- 2006 European Marathon Cup
