= Eric Kiptanui =

Kenyan long-distance runner

Personal information
- Born: 19 April 1990 (age 36)

Sport
- Country: Kenya
- Sport: Athletics
- Event: Long-distance running
- Team: NN Running Team
Medal record
World Marathon Majors
Bronze medal – third place	2021 Chicago	Marathon

Eric Kiptanui (born 19 April 1990) is a Kenyan long-distance runner who specializes in road running.

In 2017, he won the San Silvestre Vallecana 10 kilometres road race in Madrid.

In 2018, he took victory in the Lisbon Half Marathon in 1:00:05. He also won the Berlin Half Marathon, setting a course record of 58:42 which at the time was the fourth fastest half marathon ever.

Kiptanui won the Barcelona Half Marathon in 2019.

In 2021, he secured his first medal at a World Marathon Major by finishing third at the 2021 Chicago Marathon with a time of 2:06:51.

== Personal bests ==
- 1500 metres – 3:37.73 (Nairobi 2016)
- 10,000 metres – 27:33.42 (Nijmegen 2019)
- 10 kilometres – 28:53 (Eldoret 2019) (also 27:34 not legal)
- Half marathon – 58:42 (Berlin 2018)
- Marathon – 2:05:47 (Siena 2021)
