= Rachid Ziar =

Algerian long-distance runner

Rachid Ziar (born 15 November 1973) is a retired Algerian long-distance runner who specialized in the marathon.

He finished 24th at the 1999 World Half Marathon Championships, 19th at the 2001 World Half Marathon Championships and 18th at the 2003 World Championships. He also competed at the 2004 Olympic Games, but did not finish the race.

His personal best times were 1:01:30 hours in the half marathon, achieved in September 1999 in Uijeongbu; and 2:09:54 hours in the marathon, achieved in April 2002 in the Paris Marathon.

== Achievements ==
Year	Competition	Venue	Position	Event	Notes
Representing Algeria
2002	Paris Marathon	Paris, France	5th	Marathon	2:09:54
2003	World Championships	Paris, France	18th	Marathon	2:11:58
2004	Olympic Games	Athens, Greece	—	Marathon	DNF
