= Chema Martínez =

Spanish long-distance runner (born 1971)

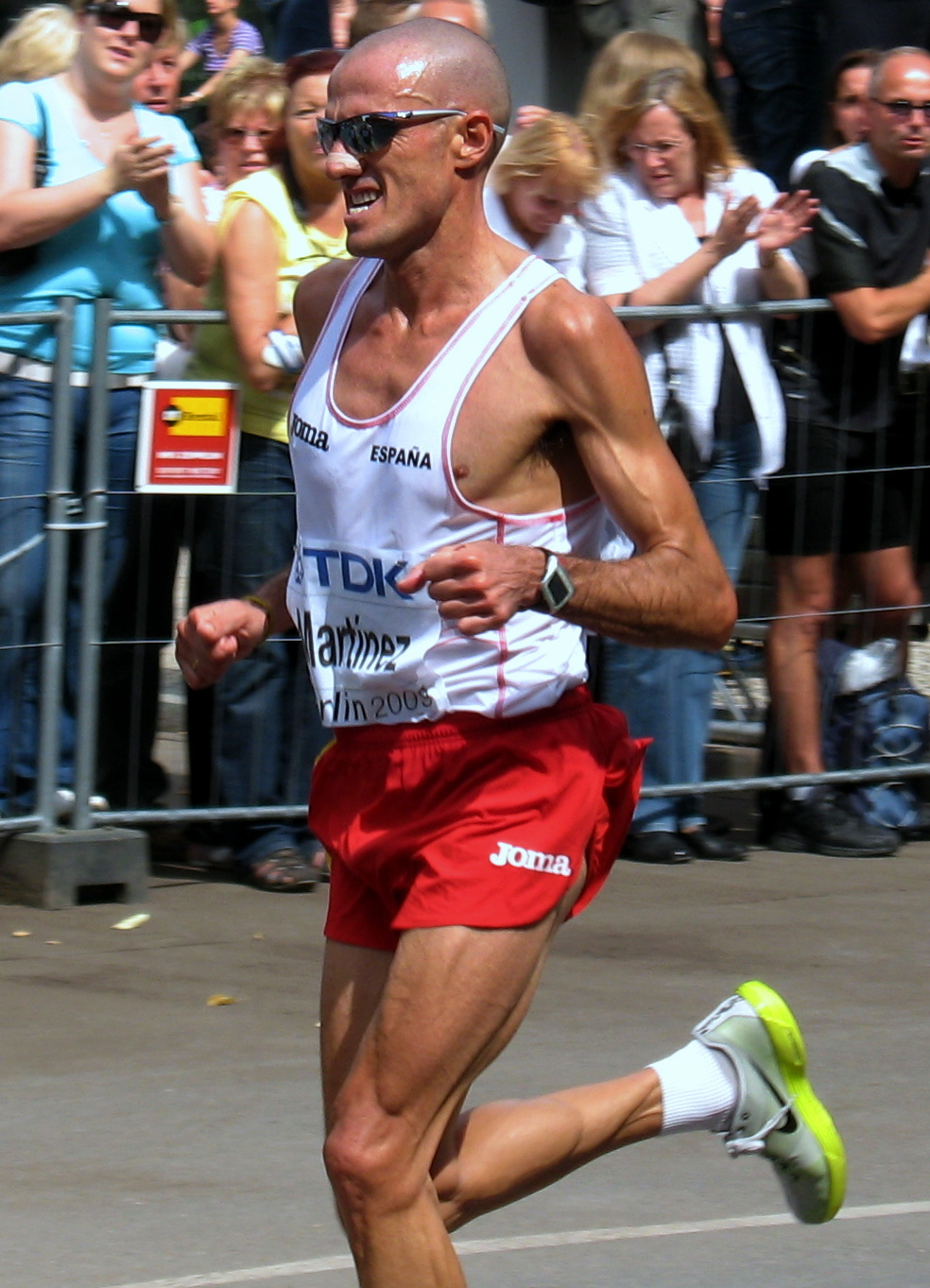
- Martínez at the 2009 World Championships in Athletics

Personal information
- Born: 22 October 1971 (age 55) Madrid, Spain

Sport
- Sport: Track and field Marathon running
Medal record
Representing Spain
European Championships
Gold medal – first place	2002 Munich	10,000 m
Silver medal – second place	2006 Gothenburg	10,000 m
Silver medal – second place	2010 Barcelona	Marathon
Mediterranean Games
Silver medal – second place	2009 Pescara	Half marathon
Bronze medal – third place	2005 Almería	Half marathon
Summer Universiade
Gold medal – first place	1999 Palma de Mallorca	10,000 m

José Manuel Martínez Fernández (born 22 October 1971), known as Chema Martínez, is a Spanish long-distance runner. He is married to Spanish field hockey player Nuria Moreno.

Martínez's first major win came at the 1999 Summer Universiade, where he became the champion in the 10,000 metres. He competed at the 2001 World Championships in Athletics, finishing 13th in the final, but was more successful at the European Athletics Championships, in which he won the 2002 gold medal in the 10,000 m, and returned to take the silver medal at the following edition in 2006. He won the San Silvestre Vallecana 10K race in Madrid in 2003.

Martínez has represented Spain at the Olympics on two occasions: in 2004, finishing ninth in the 10,000 m, and at the 2008 Summer Olympics, at which he was 16th in the Olympic marathon race.

Other significant achievements include a win at the Madrid Marathon in 2008 (his first marathon win), a bronze medal at the 2005 Mediterranean Games, a silver medal in the half marathon at the 2009 Mediterranean Games and an eighth-place finish in the marathon at the 2009 World Championships in Athletics. He has competed at the IAAF World Cross Country Championships on numerous occasions, with his best performance of 17th coming at the 2003 edition.

He ran in the 2010 Cursa de Bombers and finished in third place with a time of 28:54. Martínez took third at the European Cup 10000m in early June, although he was some distance behind the winner Mo Farah of Great Britain. He was Spain's top contender for the marathon at the 2010 European Athletics Championships in Barcelona. He won the silver medal but was satisfied with the performance as winner Viktor Röthlin set a fast pace in the hot race. Martínez ended the year at the San Silvestre Vallecana, where he finished fourth.

He began his 2011 season at the European Cup 10000m and finished as the runner-up behind Yousef El Kalai.

Martínez won the Spanish edition of the Wings For Life World Run in 2014 and 2015. He ran 55.56 km in 2014 finishing 40th of the global rank and 59.19 km in 2015 to get the 48th position.

== Achievements ==
Year	Competition	Venue	Position	Event
1997	World Cross Country Championships	Turin, Italy	42nd	Long race
1999	Universiade	Palma, Spain	1st	10,000 m
1999	World Championships	Seville, Spain	19th	10,000 m
2000	World Cross Country Championships	Vilamoura, Portugal	21st	Long race
2000	European Cross Country Championships	Malmö, Sweden	9th	Senior race
2000	European Cross Country Championships	Malmö, Sweden	2nd	Team race
2001	World Cross Country Championships	Ostend, Belgium	37th	Short race
2001	World Championships	Edmonton, Canada	12th	10,000 m
2001	European Cross Country Championships	Thun, France	24th	Long race
2002	World Cross Country Championships	Dublin, Ireland	35th	Long race
2002	European Championships	Munich, Germany	1st	10,000 m
2002	European Cross Country Championships	Medulin, Croatia	15th	Senior race
2002	European Cross Country Championships	Medulin, Croatia	1st	Team race
2002	Rotterdam Marathon	Rotterdam, Netherlands	3rd	Marathon
2003	World Cross Country Championships	Lausanne, Switzerland	17th	Long race
2003	Rotterdam Marathon	Rotterdam, Netherlands	3rd	Marathon
2003	World Championships	Paris, France	16th	Marathon
2004	World Cross Country Championships	Brussels, Belgium	42nd	Long race
2004	European 10,000 m Challenge	Maribor, Slovenia	1st	10,000 m
2004	Olympic Games	Athens, Greece	9th	10,000 m
2005	Mediterranean Games	Almería, Spain	3rd	Half marathon
2005	World Championships	Helsinki, Finland	30th	Marathon
2006	European Championships	Gothenburg, Sweden	2nd	10,000 m
2006	European Championships	Gothenburg, Sweden	DNF	Marathon
2006	European Cross Country Championships	San Giorgio su Legnano, Italy	15th	Senior race
2006	European Cross Country Championships	San Giorgio su Legnano, Italy	2nd	Team race
2007	World Championships	Osaka, Japan	9th	Marathon
2007	European Cross Country Championships	Toro, Spain	5th	Senior race
2007	European Cross Country Championships	Toro, Spain	1st	Team race
2008	World Cross Country Championships	Edinburgh, Scotland	56th	Senior race
2008	Madrid Marathon	Madrid Spain	1st	Marathon
2008	Olympic Games	Beijing, China	16th	Marathon
2009	European Cup 10,000 m	Ribeira Brava, Portugal	1st	10,000 m
2009	Mediterranean Games	Pescara, Italy	2nd	Half marathon
2009	World Championships	Berlin, Germany	8th	Marathon
2010	European Championships	Barcelona, Spain	2nd	Marathon

=== Personal bests ===
- 5000 metres - 13:11.13 min (Huelva, 2006)
- 10000 metres - 28:09 min (Manchester, 2007)
- 10000 metres - 27m57s61 (Atenas, 2004)
- Marathon - 2:08:09 hrs (Rotterdam, 2003)
