= Migidio Bourifa =

Italian long-distance runner

Personal information
- Nationality: Italian
- Born: 31 January 1969 (age 57) Casablanca, Morocco

Sport
- Country: Italy
- Sport: Athletics
- Event: Marathon

Achievements and titles
- Personal best: Marathon: 2:09:07 (2002)
Medal record
European Marathon Cup
Silver medal – second place	2002 Munich	Team marathon
Bronze medal – third place	2010 Barcelona	Team marathon

Migidio Bourifa (born 31 January 1969 at Casablanca) is an Italian long-distance runner who specializes in the marathon races.

== Biography ==
He formerly competed for Morocco. He finished tenth in the marathon at the 2002 European Championships. In addition he placed lowly at the 2003 World Championships and did not finish at the 2005 World Championships.

At the 1997 Half Marathon World Championships in Košice, he finished 52nd. In 1998 he finished seventh in the overall standings at the Turin Marathon and was the first Italian to do so, but he was tested positive for Amineptine during a doping test so that he was disqualified and his Italian championship title was revoked. The two-year doping ban, which was actually due, was reduced to eight months by the national federation because of "cooperative behavior".

== Achievements ==
Year	Competition	Venue	Position	Event	Notes
2000	World Half Marathon Championships	Veracruz, Mexico	32nd	Half marathon	
2000	World Half Marathon Championships	Veracruz, Mexico	5th	Team	
2001	Venice Marathon	Venice, Italy	6th	Marathon	2:11:04
2002	Paris Marathon	Paris, France	3rd	Marathon	2:09:07
2007	World Championships	Osaka, Japan	—	Marathon	DNF
2010	European Championships	Barcelona, Spain	7th	Marathon	2:20:35

== Personal bests ==
- 5000 metres - 13:51.79 min (1993)
- 10,000 metres - 28:43.5 min (2012)
- Half marathon - 1:02:35 hrs (2000)
- Marathon - 2:09:07 hrs (2002)
