= Dmitry Burmakin =

Russian long-distance runner

Dmitriy Valeryevich Burmakin (Russian: Дмитрий Валерьевич Бурмакин; born 8 January 1981 in Abakan, Khakassia) is a Russian long-distance runner who specializes in the marathon races.

He finished thirteenth in the marathon at the 2006 European Championships. Before that he had placed lowly at the 2004 Summer Olympics and did not finish at the 2005 World Championships.

== International competitions ==
Year	Competition	Venue	Position	Event	Notes
Representing Russia
2004	Olympic Games	Athens, Greece	73rd	Marathon	2:31:51
2006	European Championships	Gothenburg, Sweden	13th	Marathon	2:15:33

== Personal bests ==
- Half marathon - 1:07:06 hrs (2006)
- Marathon - 2:11:20 hrs (2005)
