= Ruggero Pertile =

Italian long-distance runner

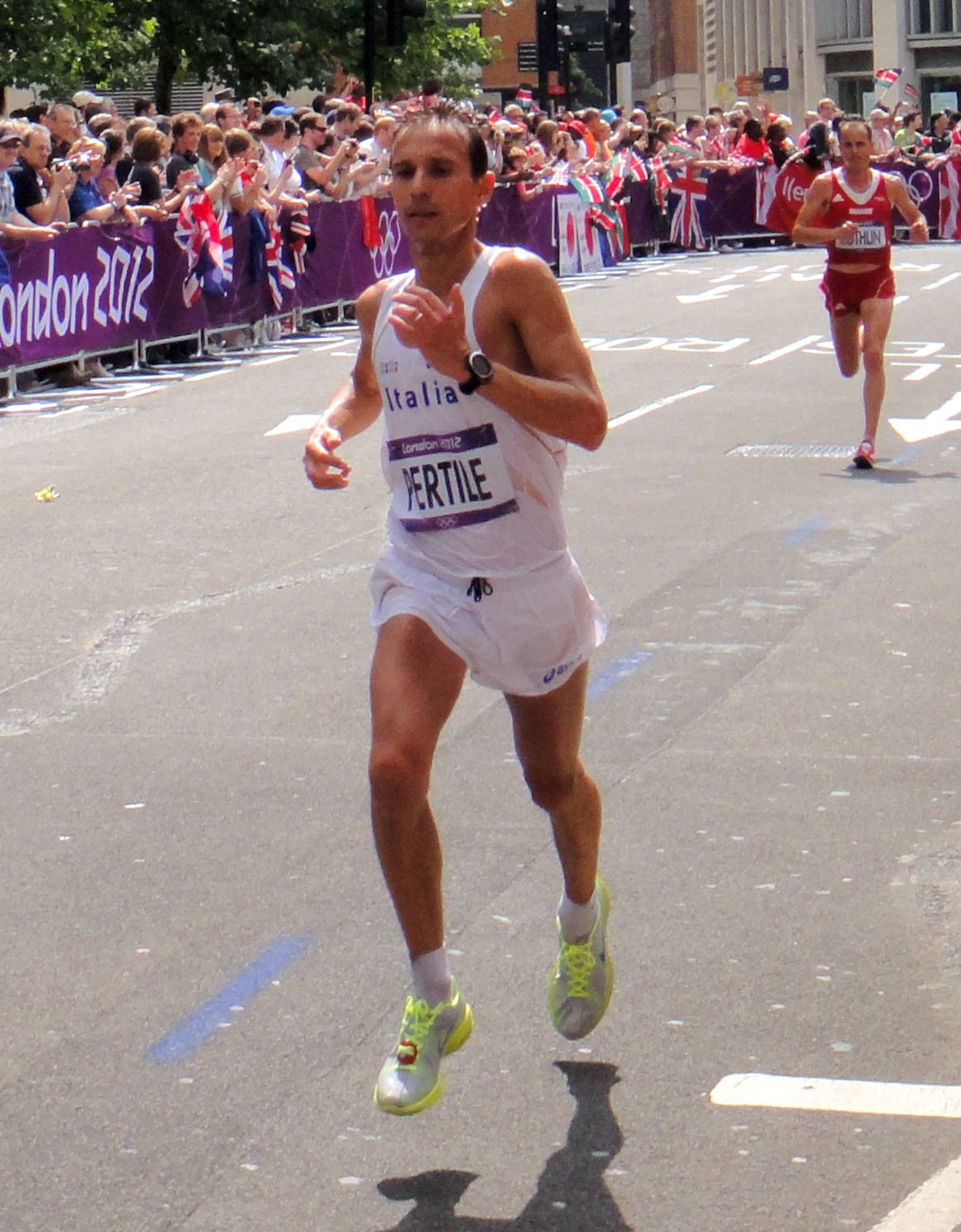
- Ruggero Pertile in the marathon at the 2012 Summer Olympics in London

Personal information
- Born: 8 August 1974 (age 52)
- Height: 1.70 m (5 ft 7 in)
- Weight: 56 kg (123 lb)

Sport
- Country: Italy
- Sport: Athletics
- Event: Marathon

Achievements and titles
- Personal best: Marathon: 2:09:53 (2009)
Medal record
European Championships
Bronze medal – third place	2016 Amsterdam	Half marathon team
European Marathon Cup
Bronze medal – third place	2010 Barcelona	Team marathon
Mediterranean Games
Silver medal – second place	2013 Mersin	Half marathon

Ruggero Pertile (born 8 August 1974 in Camposampiero) is an Italian long-distance runner who specialises in marathon running. He was the winner of the 2004 Rome City Marathon and has represented Italy internationally at three World Championships in Athletics and two Olympic Games.

== Biography ==
He was fourth in the marathon at the 2010 European Athletics Championships, missing out on the podium after struggling with cramping in the final stages of the race. He took a surprise victory at the 2010 Turin Marathon, completing the race in a time of 2:10:58 in rainy conditions. The following year he competed at the Milano City Marathon and overhauled Daniel Too in the final stages to claim second place on the podium.

== Achievements ==
Year	Competition	Venue	Result	Event	Time
2003	World Championships	Paris, France	23rd	Marathon	2:13:45
2004	Rome City Marathon	Rome, Italy	1st	Marathon	2:10:12
2005	World Championships	Helsinki, Finland	35th	Marathon	2:21:34
2006	European Championships	Gothenburg, Sweden	–	Marathon	DNF
2008	Summer Olympics	Beijing, China	15th	Marathon	2:13:39
2009	Mediterranean Games	Pescara, Italy	4th	Half Marathon	1:04:49
2010	European Championships	Barcelona, Spain	4th	Marathon	2:19:33
2011	World Championships	Daegu, South Korea	8th	Marathon	2:11:57
2012	Summer Olympics	London, United Kingdom	10th	Marathon	2:12:45
2013	Mediterranean Games	Mersin, Turkey	2nd	Half marathon	1:07.07
2014	European Championships	Zürich, Switzerland	7th	Marathon	2:14:18
2015	World Championships	Beijing, China	4th	Marathon	2:14:22
2016	European Championships	Amsterdam, Netherlands	29th	Half marathon	1:05:48

== See also ==
- Italian all-time lists – Marathon
