= Pablo Villalobos =

Spanish long-distance runner

Personal information
- Nationality: Spanish
- Born: May 20, 1979 (age 47) Almendralejo, Spain

Sport
- Sport: Athletics
- Events: Long-distance running Marathon running

Pablo Villalobos Bazaga (born 20 May 1979) is a Spanish long-distance runner. He finished seventh in the 5,000m final at the 2006 European Athletics Championships in Gothenburg and fifth in the marathon at the 2010 European Athletics Championships in Barcelona.
