= Dan Robinson (runner) =

English marathon runner (born 1975)

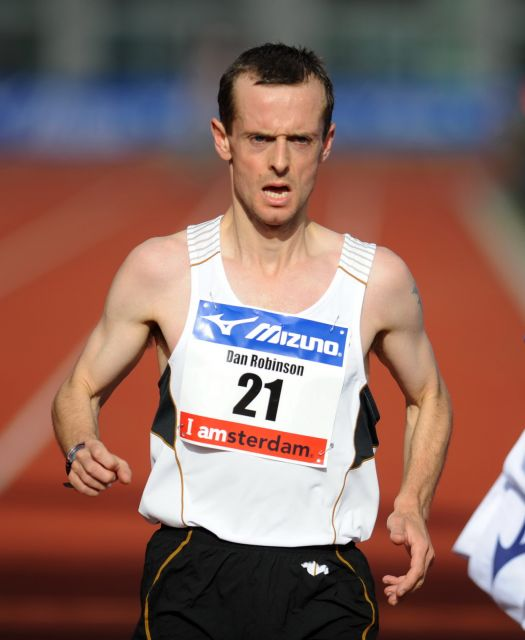

Personal information
- Nationality: British (English)
- Born: 13 January 1975 (age 51) Cheltenham, England
- Height: 163 cm (5 ft 4 in)
- Weight: 51 kg (112 lb)

Sport
- Sport: Athletics
- Event: long-distance
- Club: Tipton Harriers
Medal record
Men's athletics
Representing England
Commonwealth Games
Bronze medal – third place	2006 Melbourne	Marathon

Daniel Stephen Rowley Robinson (born 13 January 1975 in Cheltenham) is a former English long-distance runner who specialises in the marathon. He represented Great Britain in the marathon at the 2004 and 2008 Olympic games.

He finished in 12th place in the 2005 World Championships and in 2006 won the bronze medal at the Commonwealth Games. He finished in 9th place in the 2007 London Marathon, securing his place in the Great Britain team for the World Championships in Osaka, where he finished in 11th position.

He ran at the 2009 Great North Run and was the first British man to finish, taking twelfth place. He set a marathon personal best at the 2009 Amsterdam Marathon, recorded a time of 2:12:14 and finishing eleventh. At the 2010 London Marathon, he had to drop out mid-race due to a calf injury. However, remained confident of running at both the 2010 European Athletics Championships and 2010 Commonwealth Games, which he had achieved the qualifying times for.

== Achievements ==
Year	Competition	Venue	Position	Event	Notes
2000	London Marathon	London, United Kingdom	41st	Marathon	2:24:11
2001	World Half Marathon Championships	Bristol, United Kingdom	57th	Half marathon	1:04:23
2001	Frankfurt Marathon	Frankfurt, Germany	9th	Marathon	2:16:51
2002	London Marathon	London, United Kingdom	15th	Marathon	2:17:53
2003	Berlin Marathon	Berlin, Germany	26th	Marathon	2:18:00
2004	London Marathon	London, United Kingdom	16th	Marathon	2:13:53
2004	Olympic Games	Athens, Greece	23rd	Marathon	2:17:53
2005	World Championships	Helsinki, Finland	12th	Marathon	2:14:26
2006	Commonwealth Games	Melbourne, Australia	3rd	Marathon	2:14:50
2006	European Championships	Gothenburg, Sweden	16th	Marathon	2:16:06
2007	London Marathon	London, United Kingdom	9th	Marathon	2:14:14
2007	World Championships	Osaka, Japan	11th	Marathon	2:20:30
2008	London Marathon	London, United Kingdom	13th	Marathon	2:13:10
2008	Olympic Games	Beijing, China	24th	Marathon	2:16:14

=== Personal bests ===
- 10,000 metres (track) - 29:31.98 min (2001 Watford)
- 10 kilometres (road) - 29:12 min (2007 Manchester)
- Half marathon - 1:03:42 hrs (2001 Reading)
- Marathon - 2:12:14 hrs (2009 Amsterdam)
