= Christopher Isengwe =

Tanzanian long-distance runner

Medal record

Men's Athletics

Representing Tanzania

World Championships
Silver medal – second place	2005 Helsinki	Marathon

Christopher Isengwe (also Christopher Isegwe Njunguda; born February 22, 1976) is a Tanzanian long-distance athlete competing mainly in the marathon.

In August 2005 he won a silver medal at the 2005 World Championships in Athletics in Helsinki. His silver medal was the first medal for Tanzania at the World Championships in history.

== Achievements ==
- All results regarding marathon, unless stated otherwise

Year	Competition	Venue	Position	Notes
Representing Tanzania
2004	Belgrade Marathon	Belgrade, Yugoslavia	1st	2:12:53
2005	World Championships	Helsinki, Finland	2nd	2:10:21
