= Primož Kobe =

Slovenian long-distance runner

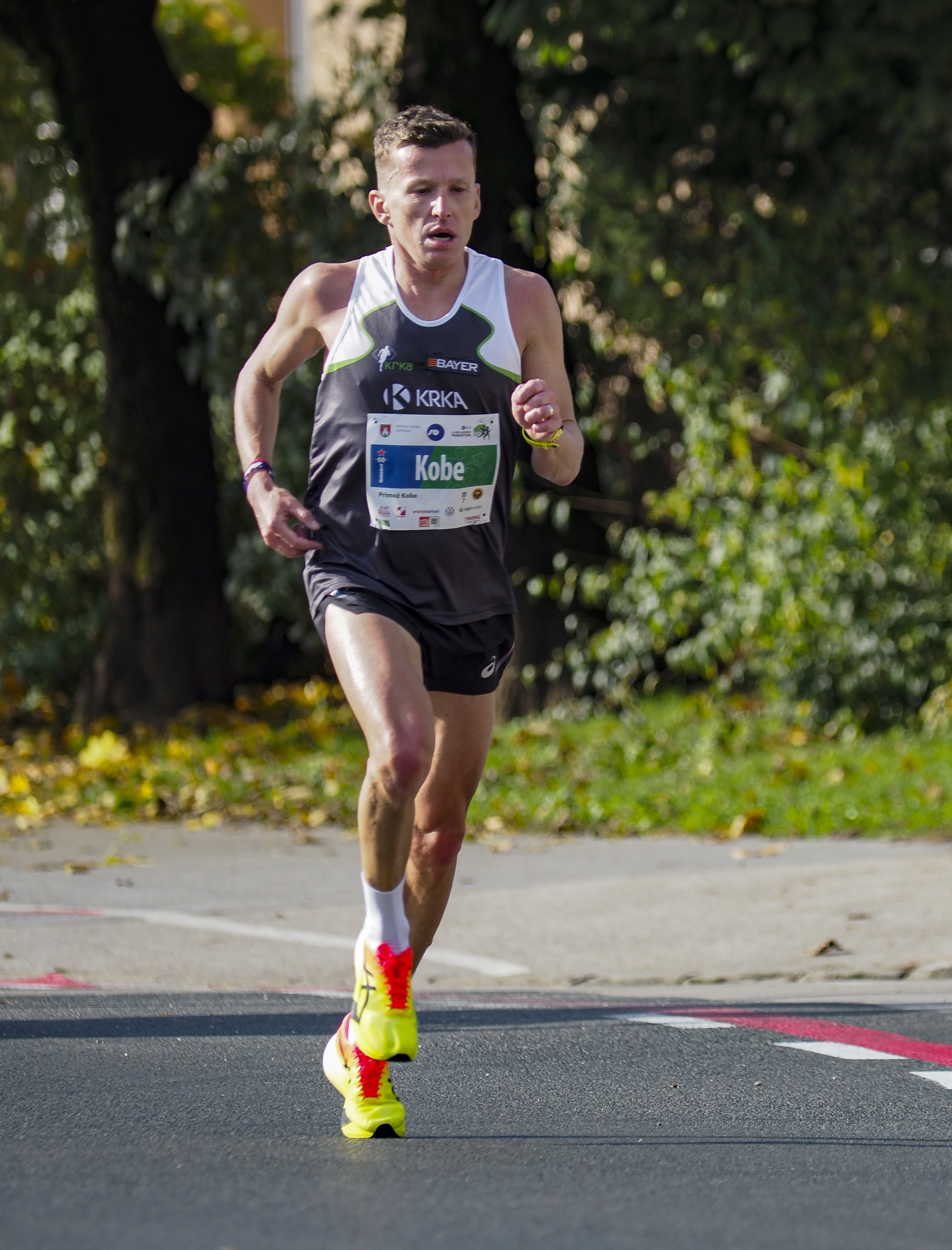
- Primož Kobe at the 2024 Ljubljana marathon

Personal information
- Born: 23 May 1981 (age 44)
- Height: 1.76 m (5 ft 9 1/2 in)
- Weight: 64 kg (141 lb)

Sport
- Country: Slovenia
- Sport: Athletics
- Event: Marathon

Primož Kobe (born 1981) is a Slovenian long-distance runner. He was born in Novo Mesto. He competed in the marathon at the 2012 Summer Olympics in London.

== Career ==
He competed in marathon at the 2012 Summer Olympics in London

He recently participated in 2024 Ljubljana Marathon where he came 8th with the timing of 02:18:21.
