= Ottaviano Andriani =

Italian marathon runner (born 1974)

Personal information
- Nationality: Italian
- Born: January 4, 1974 (age 52) Francavilla Fontana, Italy
- Height: 1.72 m (5 ft 7 1/2 in)
- Weight: 54 kg (119 lb)

Sport
- Country: Italy
- Sport: Athletics
- Event: Marathon
- Club: G.S. Fiamme Oro

Achievements and titles
- Personal bests: Marathon: 2:09.07 (2001); Half marathon: 1:01.40 (2003)
Medal record
European Marathon Cup
Bronze medal – third place	2010 Barcelona	Team marathon
Event	1st	2nd	3rd
Florence Marathon	1	0	0
Rome Marathon	0	1	0
Turin Marathon	0	1	0
Milan Marathon	0	0	1

Ottaviano "Ottavio" Andriani (Francavilla Fontana, 4 January 1974) is a former Italian marathon runner.

He won bronze medal with the national team at the 2010 European Marathon Cup.

== Biography ==
Ottaviano Andriani participated at one edition of the Summer Olympics (2008) and World Championships (2005) and four of the European Championships (1998, 2002, 2006, 2010), he has 9 caps in national team from 1998 to 2008.

== Achievements ==
Year	Competition	Venue	Position	Event	Performance	Notes
2005	World Championships	(Sweden) Gothenburg	17th	Marathon	2:16:29	
2008	Olympic Games	(China) Beijing	23rd	Marathon	2:16:10	

== See also ==
- Italian all-time lists - Marathon
