= Jeroen van Damme =

Jeroen van Damme (born 29 September 1972 in Roosendaal, North Brabant) is a Dutch long distance track, and road running athlete.

On 10 April 2005 Van Damme finished the Rotterdam Marathon in 2:13:48, qualifying for the 2005 World Championships in Athletics where he finished in 58th position.

Van Damme finished second in the St. Bavoloop on 17 June 2007 in Rijsbergen.
