= Paul Kirui =

Kenyan long-distance runner

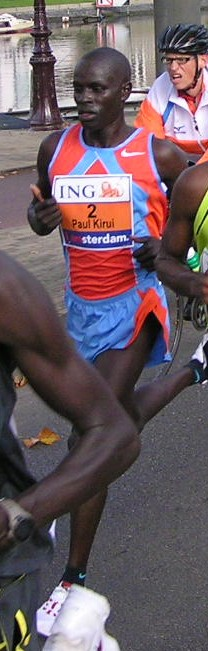
Paul Kirui during the Amsterdam Marathon 2007, where he finished fourth in 2:07:10.

Paul Kiprop Kirui (born February 5, 1980) is a Kenyan distance and marathon runner. He participated at the IAAF World Half Marathon Championships in 2004 and finished first place. He had participated the World Half Marathon Championships twice before; in 2002 he finished 10th, but the next year he did not finish. His marathon personal best is 2:06:44, set in 2006 Rotterdam Marathon, when he finished 2nd behind compatriot Sammy Korir.

Kirui reached the podium at the 2010 Seoul International Marathon, taking third in 2:07:35 – his quickest time in three years.

== Marathon record ==
- 2005 Venice Marathon - 5th
- 2005 Milan Marathon - 2nd
- 2006 Rotterdam Marathon - 2nd (time 2:06:44, PB)
- 2006 JoongAng Seoul Marathon - 2nd
- 2008 Rotterdam Marathon - 5th
- 2008 Amsterdam Marathon - 1st
- 2009 Rome Marathon - 2nd

== Half marathon record ==
- 2002 IAAF World Half Marathon Championships (Brussels, BEL) - 1st
- 2003 Berlin Half Marathon - 1st.
- 2003 IAAF World Half Marathon Championships (Vilamoura, POR) - DNF
- 2004 Berlin Half Marathon - 1st
- 2004 IAAF World Half Marathon Championships (New Delhi, IND) - 1st
