= Michael Kosgei Rotich =

Kenyan marathon runner

Michael Kosgei Rotich, or Mike Rotich (born October 26, 1982) is a marathon runner from Kenya.

Rotich finished second in the 2002 Milan Marathon. Winner Robert Kipkoech Cheruiyot, Rotich and third placed Daniele Caimmi all clocked the same time, 2:08:59 hours. The same year Rotich won the Reading Half Marathon with a time of 1:03:23.

He won the Paris Marathon in 2003 setting a course record and personal best of 2:06:32 hours, both still in force as of 2008. The same year he won the Paris Half Marathon. He competed at the 2003 World Championships marathon race, also held in Paris, finishing 8th.

He finished 2nd at the 2004 Rotterdam Marathon, behind compatriot Felix Limo. In 2007 he won the Salzburg Marathon.

Rotich comes from a Kiptoit village near Eldoret. He is managed by Federico Rosa. He is an uncle to marathon world champion Abel Kirui.

He is not to be confused with Michael Rotich, a Kenyan 800 metres runner who competed at the 2004 Summer Olympics.

== Achievements ==
Year	Competition	Venue	Position	Event	Notes
Representing Kenya
2002	Reading Half Marathon	Reading, UK	1st	Half marathon	1:03:23
2002	Milan Marathon	Milan, Italy	2nd	Marathon	2:08:59
2003	Paris Half Marathon	Paris, France	1st	Half marathon	1:01:30
2003	Paris Marathon	Paris, France	1st	Marathon	2:06:33
2003	World Championships	Paris, France	8th	Marathon	2:10:35
