= Aleksey Sokolov =

Russian marathon runner

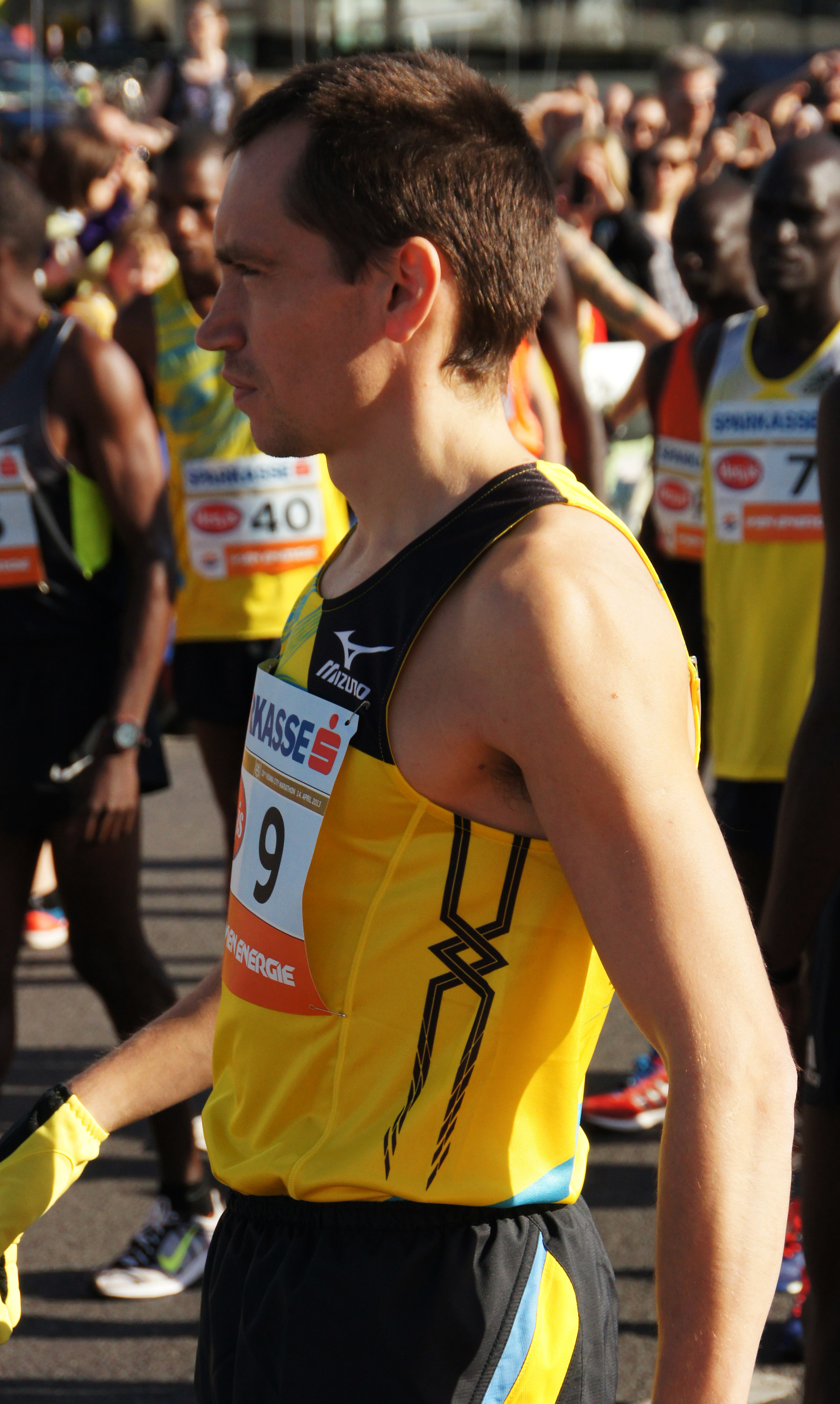
Sokolov preparing for VCM 2013.

Aleksey Vladimirovich Sokolov (Russian: Алексей Владимирович Соколов) (born November 14, 1979) is a marathon runner. He represented his country at the 2008 Summer Olympics. He won the Dublin Marathon twice and was Russia's national marathon champion in 2007. His time of 2:09:07 hours in Dublin that year is the Russian record for the event.

== Career ==
In his early running career at national level, he was second at the 2002 Moscow Marathon, then won the Ufa Marathon the following year. He was the winner of the Moscow race in 2005. In 2008, he came ninth at the London Marathon and placed 21st in the men's Olympic marathon.

His best run of 2009 was a runner-up finish at the Dublin Marathon in a time of 2:10:38 hours. He was not selected to run for Russia at the 2010 European Athletics Championships due to misunderstanding.

Sokolov had his second fastest ever run at the Zurich Marathon in 2011, coming in as runner-up in a time of 2:10:23 hours.

Aleksey Sokolov is sometimes confused with Aleksey Sokolov (Jr), another top marathon runner from Saint Petersburg. Aleksey Sokolov is a trainer for Aleksey Sokolov (Jr).
