= Berlin Half Marathon =

Annual race in Berlin, Germany

- Date: April
- Location: Berlin, Germany
- Event type: Road
- Distance: Half marathon
- Primary sponsor: Generali
- Established: 1984
- Course records: Men's: 58:42 (2018) (Kenya) Eric Kiptanui; Women's: 1:03:35 (2025) (Ethiopia) Fotyen Tesfay
- Website: Berlin Half Marathon
- Participants: 26,104 finishers (2023); 22,236 (2022); 13,283 (2021); 28,729 (2019)

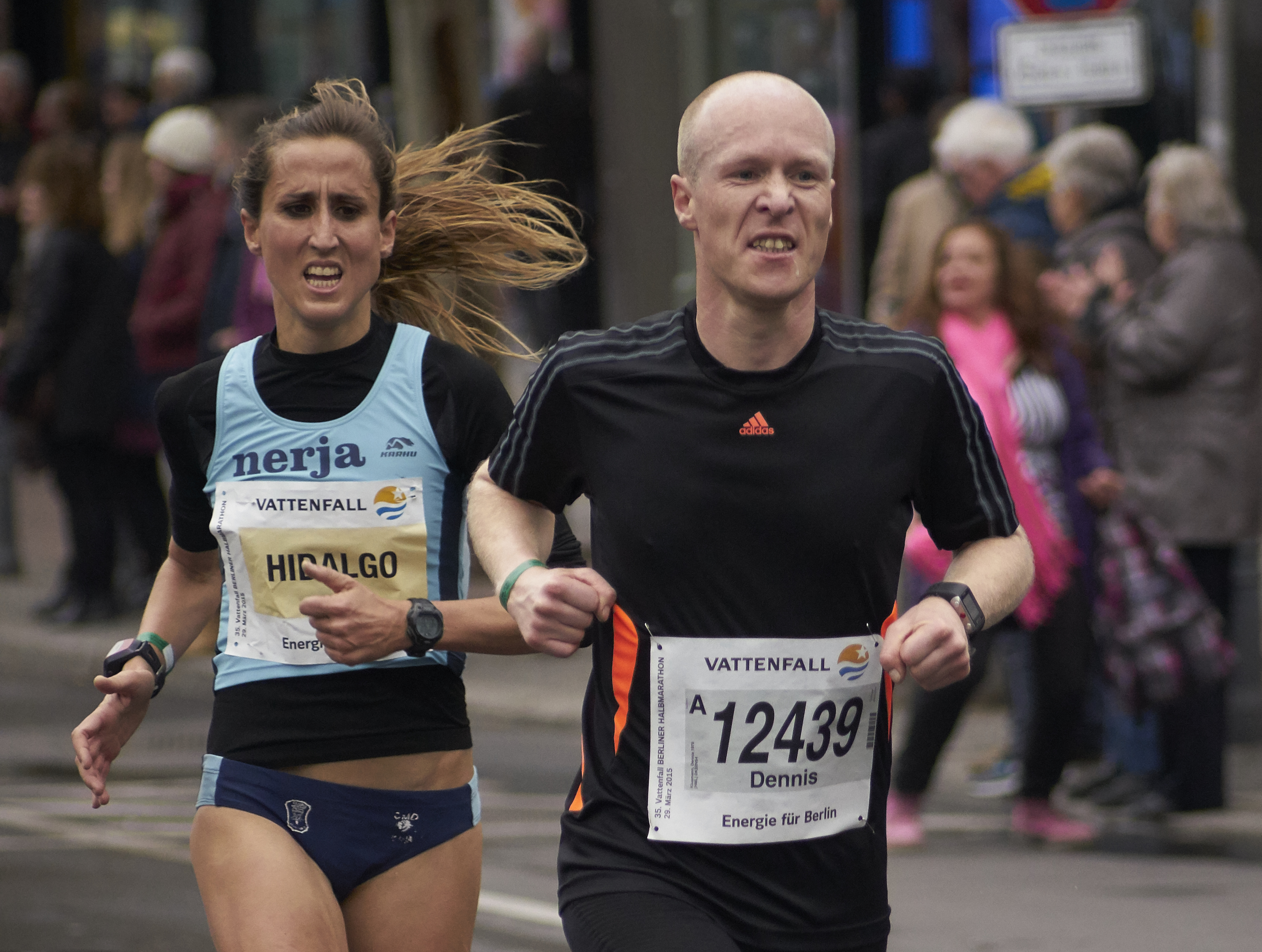
Berlin Half Marathon 2015: Esther Hidalgo (5th), Dennis Klusmann (93rd)

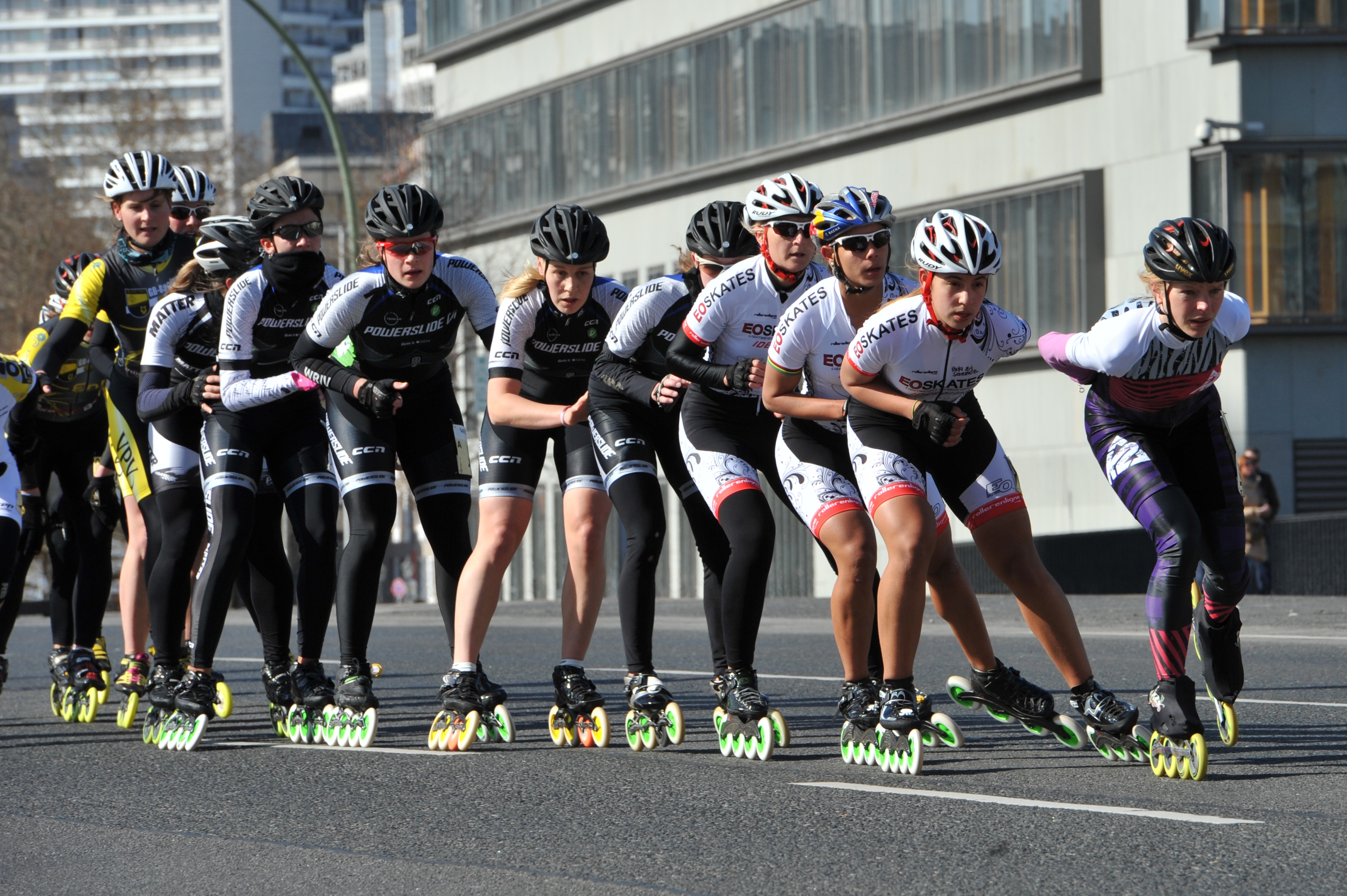
Leading inline skaters in 2012

The Berlin Half Marathon is a major endurance event held annually in early spring in Berlin, Germany. Besides the runner's main race, the event includes a race for inline skaters, wheelchair athletes and handbikers. All athletes use the same course, which has the official half marathon distance of 21.0975 km.

The half marathon and the Berlin Marathon are hosted by the club SCC Berlin and organized by SCC EVENTS. The half marathon is categorized as a Bronze Label Road Race by World Athletics.

== History ==
The story of the Berlin half marathon reflects a major part of the history of the German capital. Its predecessors came from East and West Berlin. The race, as it exists today, arose in 1990 from the Berliner Friedenslauf (Berlin Peace Run) which took place in East Berlin since 1982 and the SCC Half Marathon in the western part of the city.

The Berliner Friedenslauf covered various distances, among others a 20-kilometre race and a marathon. The event was established by the government of the GDR and served not only as a sporting event but also as an important propaganda tool. The SCC Half Marathon on the other side had local character and was designed to be the final test in preparation for the Berlin marathon, which took place four weeks later.

After the fall of the Berlin Wall in 1989 and the ensuing collapse of the GDR, the support for the Berliner Friedenslauf also diminished. So the former organizer Stefan Senkel quickly had to find a new partner to save the race. SCC-RUNNING, the organizer of the Berlin marathon, joined. Both parties agreed on one distance: a half marathon. Thus, there is only one major half marathon in Berlin since 1990.

Over the years the Berlin half marathon increased in size and popularity. Today it is by far the biggest half marathon race in Germany, with a record 36,000 participants in 2018.

The 40th anniversary of the Generali Berlin half marathon, which was planned to be held on April 5, 2020, was announced cancelled on 12 March. The decision came from the Berlin authorities as a response to the COVID-19 pandemic.

== Course records ==
=== Running ===
- Men: 0:58:42, Eric Kiptanui (Kenya), 2018
- Women: 1:03:35, Fotyen Tesfay (Ethiopia), 2025

=== Inline Skating ===
- Men: 0:30:11, Ewen Fernandez (Netherlands), 2017
- Women: 0:36:22, Jana Gegner (Germany), 2005

=== Wheelchair ===
- Men: 0:55:54, Tomasz Hamerlak (Poland), 1997
- Women: 0:56:54, Yvonne Sehmisch (Germany), 2007

=== Handbike ===
- Men: 0:32:47, Olaf Heine (Germany), 2016
- Women: 0:38:40, Christiane Reppe (Germany), 2014

== Past winners ==
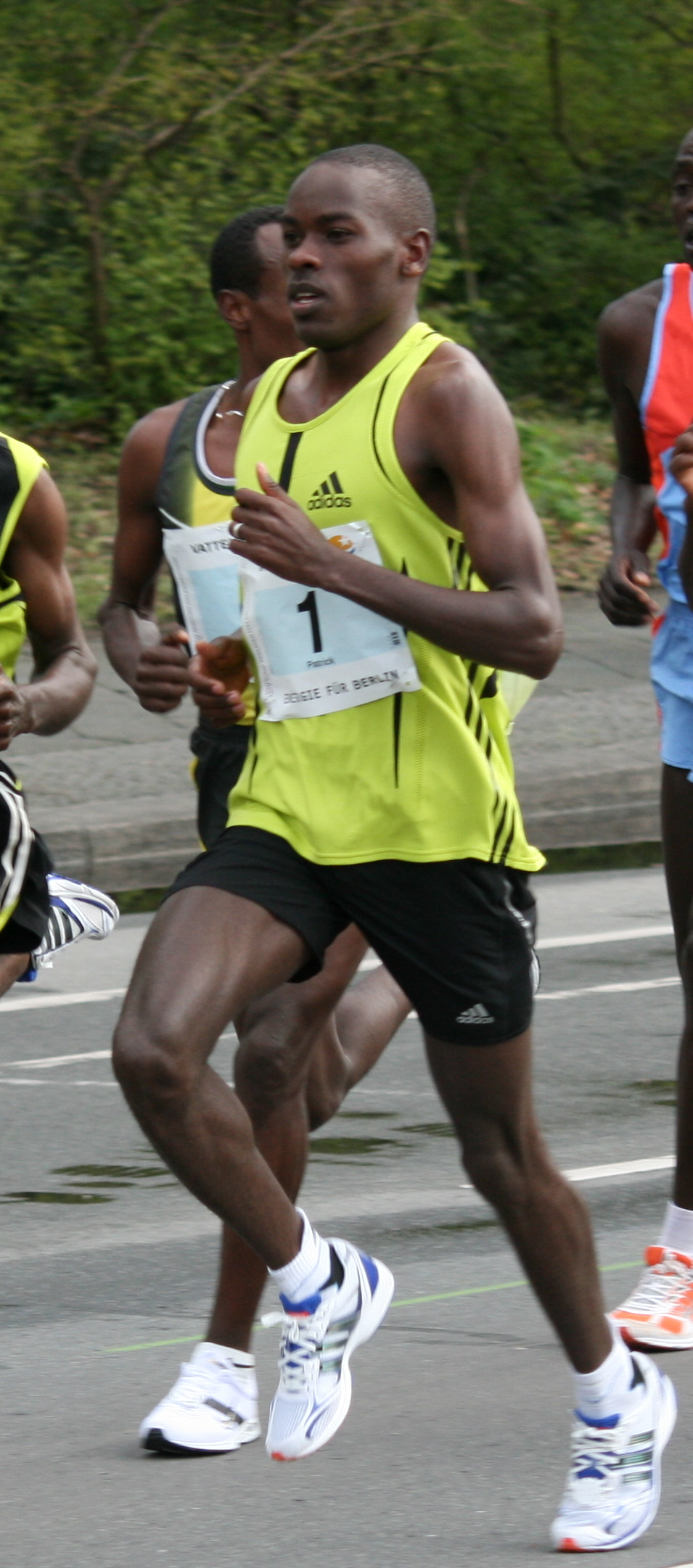
Patrick Makau Musyoki on the way to victory at the 2008 race

=== Running ===
==== Half Marathon ====
Year	Men's winner	Time	Women's winner	Time
2026	Andrea Kiptoo (KEN)	0:58:43	Likina Amebaw (ETH)	1:05:07
2025	Gemechu Dida (ETH)	0:58:43	Fotyen Tesfay (ETH)	1:03:35
2024	Daniel Ebenyo (KEN)	0:59:30	Tekle Muluat (ETH)	1:06:53
2023	Sabastian Sawe (KEN)	0:59:00	Eilish McColgan (GBR)	1:05:43
2022	Alex Kibet (KEN)	0:58:55	Sheila Chepkirui (KEN)	1:05:02
2021	Felix Kipkoech (KEN)	0:58:57	Joyciline Jepkosgei (KEN)	1:05:16
2020	cancelled due to coronavirus pandemic			
2019	William Wanjiku (KEN)	1:01:00	Sifan Hassan (NED)	1:05:45
2018	Eric Kiptanui (KEN)	0:58:42	Melat Kejeta (ETH)	1:09:04
2017	Gilbert Masai (KEN)	0:59:57	Joan Chelimo (KEN)	1:08:45
2016	Richard Mengich (KEN)	0:59:58	Elizeba Cherono (NED)	1:10:43
2015	Birhanu Legese (ETH)	0:59:45	Cynthia Kosgei (KEN)	1:10:52
2014	Leonard Komon (KEN)	0:59:14	Tadelech Bekele (ETH)	1:10:05
2013	Jacob Kendagor (KEN)	0:59:36	Helah Kiprop (KEN)	1:07:54
2012	Dennis Kipruto (KEN)	0:59:14	Philes Ongori (KEN)	1:08:25
2011	Geoffrey Kamworor (KEN)	1:00:38	Valentine Kipketer (KEN)	1:10:12
2010	Eshetu Wondimu (ETH)	1:00:16	Paskalia Kipkoech (KEN)	1:09:43
2009	Bernard Kipyego (KEN)	0:59:34	Sabrina Mockenhaupt (GER)	1:08:45
2008	Patrick Makau (KEN)	1:00:00	Peninah Arusei (KEN)	1:08:22
2007	Patrick Makau (KEN)	0:58:56	Benita Johnson (AUS)	1:08:28
2006	Paul Kosgei (KEN)	0:59:07	Edith Masai (KEN)	1:07:16
2005	Paul Kimugul (KEN)	1:01:04	Luminita Zaituc (GER)	1:11:04
2004	Paul Kirui (KEN)	1:00:40	Joyce Chepchumba (KEN)	1:09:49
2003	Paul Kirui (KEN)	1:01:05	Magdaline Chemjor (KEN)	1:11:12
2002	Peter Chebet (KEN)	1:01:19	Rose Cheruiyot (KEN)	1:09:32
2001	Fabián Roncero (ESP)	0:59:52	Joyce Chepchumba (KEN)	1:09:37
2000	Joseph Mereng (KEN)	1:01:52	Joyce Chepchumba (KEN)	1:08:22
1999	Benson Lokorwa (KEN)	1:03:25	Joyce Chepchumba (KEN)	1:10:26
1998	Andrew Eyapan (KEN)	1:03:59	Marleen Renders (BEL)	1:10:04
1997	Tendai Chimusasa (ZIM)	1:03:42	Marleen Renders (BEL)	1:10:37
1996	Charles Tangus (KEN)	1:02:50	Ursula Jeitziner (SUI)	1:11:19
1995	Philip Chirchir (KEN)	1:01:37	Sonja Krolik (GER)	1:11:42
1994	Tendai Chimusasa (ZIM)	1:01:45	Kathrin Weßel (GER)	1:10:47
1993	Carsten Eich (GER)	1:00:34	Päivi Tikkanen (FIN)	1:12:30
1992	Stephan Freigang (GER)	1:01:14	Maria Starovska (TCH)	1:12:08
1991	Rustam Shagiev (URS)	1:06:14	Madina Biktagirova (URS)	1:11:34
1990	Stephan Freigang (GDR)	1:02:25	Birgit Stephan (GDR)	1:14:20
1989	Andrzej Nowak (POL)	1:06:57	Silvia Wilhelm (FRG)	1:21:29
1988	Ingo Sensburg (FRG)	1:10:45	Kerstin Preßler (FRG)	1:13:05
1987	Ingo Sensburg (FRG)	1:09:43	Silvia Wilhelm (FRG)	1:17:19
1986	Ingo Sensburg (FRG)	1:06:33	Andrea Knapp (FRG)	1:19:49
1985	Ingo Sensburg (FRG)	1:07:39	Kerstin Preßler (FRG)	1:15:44
1984	Bernie Dowson (GBR)	1:06:51	Angelika Brandt (FRG)	1:22:45

==== Berlin Peace Run (20 kilometer) ====
Year	Men's winner	Time	Women's winner	Time
1989	Milan Krajč (TCH)	1:03:10	Galina Ikonnikowa (URS)	1:09:12
1988	Roland Günther (GDR)	1:00:23	Annette Fincke (GDR)	1:10:03
1987	Jörg Peter (GDR)	1:00:10	Rosemarie Kössler (GDR)	1:16:01
1986	Jan Marchewka (POL)	1:02:57	Jeannette Hain (GDR)	1:11:09
1985	Michael Heilmann (GDR)	1:00:54	Galina Ikonnikowa (URS)	1:10:56
1984	Roland Günther (GDR)	1:00:51	Galina Ikonnikowa (URS)	1:08:36
1983	Michael Heilmann (GDR)	1:03:03	Julia Riethmüller (GDR)	1:17:11
1982	Hartmut Tronnier (GDR)	1:03:13	Julia Riethmüller (GDR)	1:15:46

=== Inline Skating ===
Year	Men's winner	Time	Women's winner	Time
2025	Felix Rijhnen (GER)	32:13	Noraly Berber Vonk (NED)	40:59
2024	Nolan Beddiaf (FRA)	30:13	Laura Files (GER)	38:57
2023	Felix Rijhnen (GER)	30:53	Josie Hofmann (GER)	36:58
2022	Felix Rijhnen (GER)	33:49	Josie Hofmann (GER)	37:53
2021	Bart Swings (BEL)	29:38	Sandrine Tas (BEL)	36:12
2020	cancelled due to coronavirus pandemic			
2019	Nolan Beddiaf (FRA)	30:41	Chloé Geoffroy (FRA)	36:59
2018	Sebastian Mirsch (GER)	32:31	Katharina Rumpus (GER)	38:48
2017	Ewen Fernandez (FRA)	30:11	Katharina Rumpus (GER)	37:25
2016	Gary Hekman (NED)	30:35	Sandrine Tas (BEL)	36:49
2015	Felix Rijhnen (GER)	36:39	Sabine Berg (GER)	41:33
2014	Felix Rijhnen (GER)	31:34	Katharina Rumpus (GER)	36:46
2013	Julien Levrard (FRA)	32:07	Katharina Rumpus (GER)	38:47
2012	Bart Swings (BEL)	30:41	Cecilia Banea (COL)	39:29
2011	Yann Guyader (FRA)	30:44	Mareike Thum (GER)	37:25
2010	Severin Widmer (SUI)	35:10	Cecilia Banea (COL)	43:31
2009	Alexis Contin (FRA)	31:48	Cecilia Banea (COL)	38:28
2008	Scott Arlidge (NZL)	34:11	Hilde Goovaerts (BEL)	38:16
2007	Niclas Kleyling (GER)	32:08	Jana Gegner (GER)	40:02
2006	Victor Wilking (GER)	33:04	Jana Gegner (GER)	39:58
2005	Sutton Atkins (GBR)	34:04	Jana Gegner (GER)	36:22
2004	Jörg Wecke (GER)	35:37	Britta Vantournhout (BEL)	40:21
2003	Kalon Dobbin (NZL)	37:21	Silvia Niño (COL)	44:41
2002	Kalon Dobbin (NZL)	35:37	Silvia Niño (COL)	35:47
2001	Steven Madsen (DEN)	34:36	Stephanie Pipke (GER)	38:35
2000	Steven Madsen (DEN)	36:28	Severin Stölzer (GER)	37:04
1999	Kalon Dobbin (NZL)	37:55	Daniela Dietzold (GER)	46:40
1997	Sebastian Baumgartner (GER)	44:55	Tina Pechardscheck (GER)	51:14
