= Juan Carlos de la Ossa =

Spanish long-distance runner

Juan Carlos de la Ossa Yunta (born 25 November 1976 in Cuenca) is a Spanish middle-distance runner who mostly concentrates on the 5000 and 10,000 metres. He won a bronze medal in the latter event at the 2006 European Championships in Athletics. His personal best time is 27:27.80 minutes, achieved in April 2005 in Barakaldo.

== Achievements ==
Year	Tournament	Venue	Result	Event
2003	World Championships	Paris, France	9th	5000 m
2004	European Cross Country Championships	Heringsdorf, Germany	2nd	Long race
2005	World Championships	Helsinki, Finland	14th	10,000 m
2006	European Championships	Gothenburg, Sweden	3rd	10,000 m
