= José Ríos =

Spanish long-distance runner

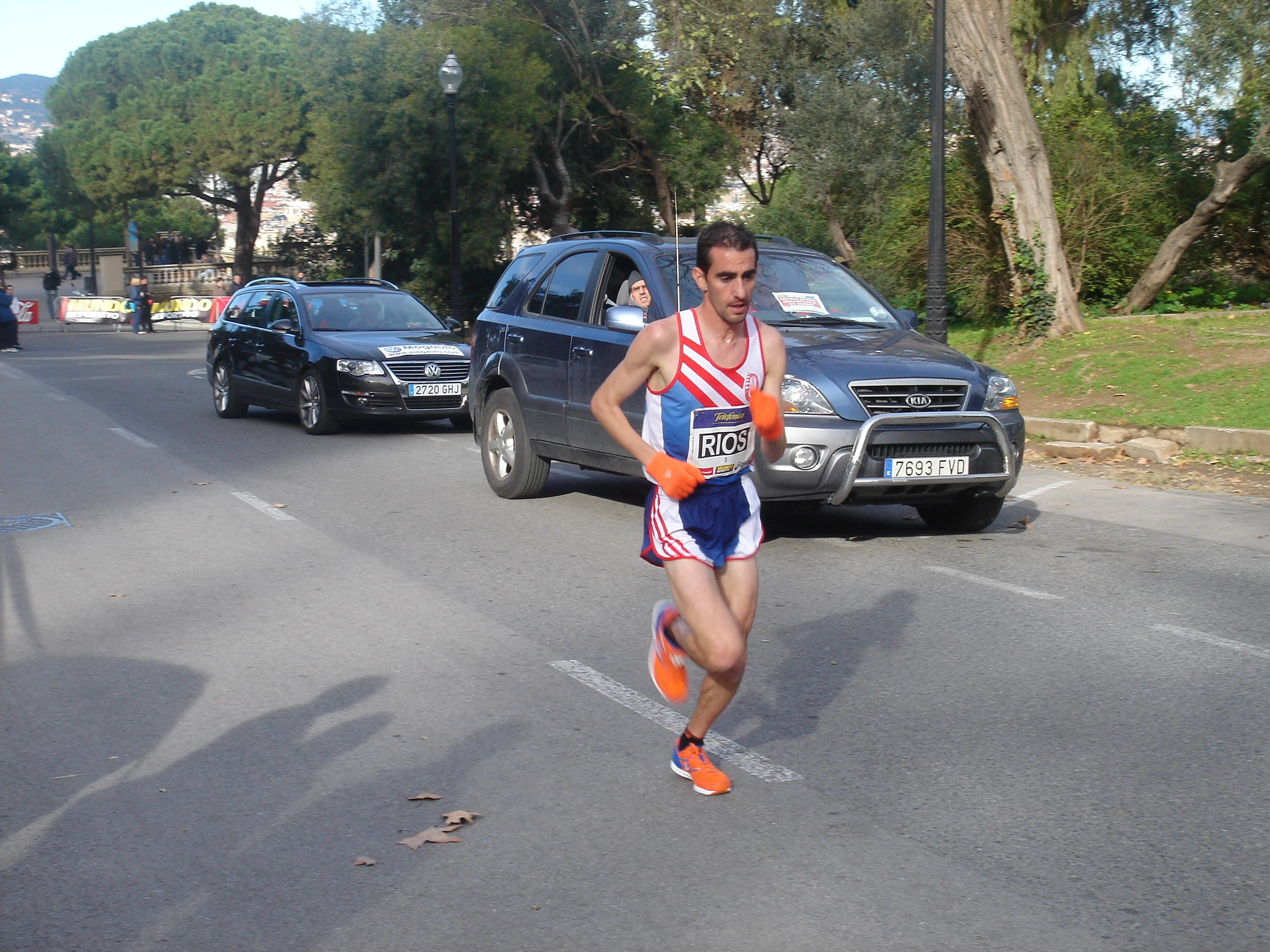
- Image of José Ríos, during a marathon. He is a Spanish runner.

Medal record

Men's athletics

Representing Spain

European Championships
Bronze medal – third place	2002 Munich	10,000 m

José Ríos Ortega (born 15 March 1974 in Premià de Dalt, Barcelona) is a Spanish runner. He specializes in the 10,000 metres and marathon. He won the Lake Biwa Marathon in 2006.

== Achievements ==
Year	Competition	Venue	Position	Event	Notes
Representing Spain
2000	Olympic Games	Sydney	18th	10,000 m	
2001	World Cross Country Championships	Ostend, Belgium	35th	Short race	
2001	World Cross Country Championships	Ostend, Belgium	4th	Team	
2001	World Championships	Edmonton, Canada	6th	10,000 m	
2002	European Championships	Munich, Germany	3rd	10,000 m	
2003	World Cross Country Championships	Lausanne, Switzerland	21st	Short race	
2003	World Cross Country Championships	Lausanne, Switzerland	4th	Team	
2004	Lake Biwa Marathon	Ōtsu, Japan	1st	Marathon	
2004	Olympic Games	Athens, Greece	27th	Marathon	
2006	Lake Biwa Marathon	Ōtsu, Japan	1st	Marathon	
2006	European Championships	Gothenburg, Sweden	DNF	Marathon	
2007	World Championships	Osaka, Japan	17th	Marathon	

=== Personal bests ===
- 3000 metres – 7:42.08 min (2002)
- 5000 metres – 13:07.59 min (2000)
- 10,000 metres – 27:22.20 min (2000)
- Marathon – 2:07:42 hrs (2004)
