= Julio Rey =

Spanish long-distance runner

José Julio Rey (born 13 January 1972 in Toledo, Spain) is a Spanish long-distance runner who won the Hamburg Marathon 4 times between 2001 and 2006. He was banned from competition for 2 years after testing positive for mesterolone at the 1999 Rotterdam Marathon.

== Achievements ==
Year	Competition	Venue	Position	Event	Notes
Representing Spain
1997	World Cross Country Championships	Turin, Italy	9th	Long race	
1997	World Championships	Athens, Greece	8th	10,000 m	
1998	London Marathon	London, United Kingdom	4th	Marathon	2:08:33
1998	European Championships	Budapest, Hungary	4th	Marathon	2:13:17
1999	Rotterdam Marathon	Rotterdam, Netherlands	3rd	Marathon	2:07:37
2001	Hamburg Marathon	Hamburg, Germany	1st	Marathon	2:07:46
2001	World Championships	Edmonton, Canada	37th	Marathon	2:27:59
2002	European Championships	Munich, Germany	3rd	Marathon	2:13:21
2002	Tokyo Marathon	Tokyo, Japan	3rd	Marathon	2:11:11
2003	Hamburg Marathon	Hamburg, Germany	1st	Marathon	2:07:27
2003	World Championships	Paris, France	2nd	Marathon	2:08:38
2004	Olympic Games	Athens, Greece	58th	Marathon	2:24:54
2005	Hamburg Marathon	Hamburg, Germany	1st	Marathon	2:07:38
2005	World Championships	Helsinki, Finland	8th	Marathon	2:12:51
2005	Fukuoka Marathon	Fukuoka, Japan	2nd	Marathon	2:09:41
2006	Hamburg Marathon	Hamburg, Germany	1st	Marathon	2:06:52
2006	European Championships	Gothenburg, Sweden	3rd	Marathon	2:12:37
2007	Paris Marathon	Paris, France	9th	Marathon	2:11:36
2007	World Championships	Osaka, Japan	—	Marathon	DNF
2008	Hamburg Marathon	Hamburg, Germany	16th	Marathon	2:13:20

=== Personal bests ===
- 3000 metres - 7:54.40 min (1997)
- 5000 metres - 13:22.13 min (1998)
- 10,000 metres - 27:47.33 min (1998)
- Half marathon - 1:02:10 hrs (2002)
- Marathon - 2:06:52 hrs (2006)

== See also ==
- List of sportspeople sanctioned for doping offences
