= Alberto Chaíça =

Portuguese long-distance runner

Alberto Chaíça (born 17 September 1973, Caparica) is a Portuguese long-distance runner.

His best result to date has been a finish in 4th place in the marathon at the 2003 World Championships in Athletics in Paris. He competed in the marathon at the 2004 Olympics finishing 8th. He also finished 8th in the marathon at the 2006 European Athletics Championships in Gothenburg.

== Achievements ==
Year	Competition	Venue	Position	Event	Notes
Representing Portugal
2003	World Championships	Paris, France	4th	Marathon	2:09:25
2004	Olympic Games	Athens, Greece	8th	Marathon	2:14:17
2006	European Championships	Gothenburg, Sweden	8th	Marathon	2:13:14
2007	World Championships	Osaka, Japan	22nd	Marathon	2:23:22
