= Viktor Röthlin =

Swiss marathon runner (born 1974)

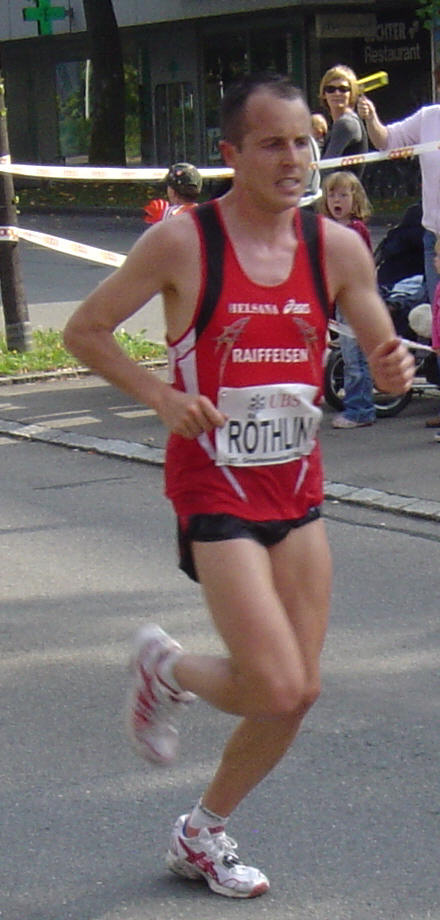

Personal information
- Born: 14 October 1974 (age 51)
- Height: 1.72 m (5 ft 7 1/2 in)
- Weight: 60 kg (130 lb)

Sport
- Country: Switzerland
- Sport: Athletics
- Event: Marathon
Medal record
World Championships
Bronze medal – third place	2007 Osaka	Marathon
European Championships
Gold medal – first place	2010 Barcelona	Marathon
Silver medal – second place	2006 Göteborg	Marathon

Viktor Röthlin (born 14 October 1974 in Kerns, Obwalden) is a Swiss former long-distance runner, who specialized in the marathon.

Röthlin won the silver medal at the 2006 European Championships in Gothenburg, Sweden, the bronze medal at the 2007 World Championships in Osaka, Japan, and the gold medal at the 2010 European Championships in Barcelona, Spain.

He also competed in the marathon at the 2000 Olympics in Sydney, Australia (finishing 36th), at the 2004 Olympics in Athens, Greece (where he did not finish), at the 2008 Olympics in Beijing, China (where he placed 6th in a time of 2:10:35) and at the 2012 Olympics in London, Great Britain (where he finished in 11th with a time of 2:12:48).

Röthlin has set four Swiss national records at the marathon distance: In September 2001 at the Berlin Marathon, his time of 2:10:54 eclipsed the previous Swiss national record of 2:11:10 (set by Daniel Boltz in 1991). In April 2004, in his victory at the Zürich Marathon, Röthlin lowered the national record to 2:09:56. In April 2007, he lowered the national record again, when he won the Zürich Marathon in a time of 2:08:20, and in February 2008, he once more improved the Swiss record to 2:07:23 when he won the Tokyo Marathon.

Röthlin attempted no marathons in 2009, because he contracted thrombosis during a flight from the United Arab Emirates in the Spring of 2009, which led to a pulmonary embolism and fluid buildup in his chest; the condition was treated with rest and medication.

At the 2012 Tokyo Marathon he had his fastest performance since his victory in 2008, as he finished fifth with a time of 2:08:32 hours.

Röthlin retired from competitive marathon running in 2014, after finishing fifth at the European Championships in Zürich.

Since retiring, Röthlin has been active in coaching, becoming the coach of Matthias Kyburz in 2024.

== Achievements ==
- All results are for the marathon, unless stated otherwise

Year	Competition	Venue	Position	Notes
1999	Hamburg Marathon	Hamburg, Germany	12th	2:13:36
2000	Rotterdam Marathon	Rotterdam, Netherlands	20th	2:12:53
2000	Olympic Games	Sydney, Australia	36th	2:20:06
2001	Rotterdam Marathon	Rotterdam, Netherlands	13th	2:12:22
2001	Berlin Marathon	Berlin, Germany	8th	2:10:54
2002	European Championships	Munich, Germany	16th	2:16:16
2003	Zürich Marathon	Zürich, Switzerland	2nd	2:11:05
2003	World Championships	Paris, France	14th	2:11:14
2004	Zürich Marathon	Zürich, Switzerland	1st	2:09:55
2004	Olympic Games	Athens, Greece	—	DNF
2005	Zürich Marathon	Zürich, Switzerland	4th	2:11:00
2005	New York City Marathon	New York City, United States	7th	2:11:44
2006	European Championships	Gothenburg, Sweden	2nd	2:11:50
2007	Zürich Marathon	Zürich, Switzerland	1st	2:08:20
2007	World Championships	Osaka, Japan	3rd	2:17:25
2008	Tokyo Marathon	Tokyo, Japan	1st	2:07:23
2008	Olympic Games	Beijing, China	6th	2:10:35
2010	European Championships	Barcelona, Spain	1st	2:15:31
2010	New York City Marathon	New York City, United States	—	DNF
2011	London Marathon	London, United Kingdom	11th	2:12:43
2011	New York Marathon	New York City, United States	11th	2:12:26
2012	Tokyo Marathon	Tokyo, Japan	5th	2:08:32
2012	Olympic Games	London, United Kingdom	11th	2:12:48
2013	Lake Biwa Marathon	Ōtsu, Japan	8th	2:10:18
2014	European Championships	Zürich, Switzerland	5th	2:13:07
