= 2000 IAAF World Half Marathon Championships =

- Organisers: IAAF
- Edition: 9th
- Date: November 12
- Host city: Veracruz City, Mexico
- Events: 2
- Participation: 182 athletes from 52 nations

The 9th IAAF World Half Marathon Championships was held on November 12, 2000, in the city of Veracruz, Mexico. A total of 182 athletes, 121 men and 61 women, from 52 countries took part. Detailed reports on the event and an appraisal of the results was given.

Complete results were published.

== Medallists ==
Event	Gold		Silver		Bronze	
Individual
Men	Paul Tergat (KEN)	1:03:47	Faustin Baha (TAN)	1:03:48	Tesfaye Jifar (ETH)	1:03:50
Women	Paula Radcliffe (GBR)	1:09:07	Susan Chepkemei (KEN)	1:09:40	Lidia Șimon (ROU)	1:10:24
Team
Team Men	Kenya	3:11:38	Ethiopia	3:14:45	Belgium	3:18:35
Team Women	Romania	3:34:22	Japan	3:36:25	Russia	3:45:41

== Race results ==
=== Men's ===
Rank	Athlete	Nationality	Time	Notes
1st place, gold medalist(s)	Paul Tergat	Kenya	1:03:47	
2nd place, silver medalist(s)	Faustin Baha	Tanzania	1:03:48	
3rd place, bronze medalist(s)	Tesfaye Jifar	Ethiopia	1:03:50	
4	Joseph Kimani	Kenya	1:03:52	
5	David Ruto	Kenya	1:03:59	
6	John Gwako	Kenya	1:04:16	
7	Zebedayo Bayo	Tanzania	1:04:25	
8	Óscar Fernández	Spain	1:04:25	
9	Marco Mazza	Italy	1:04:26	
10	Noureddine Betim	Algeria	1:04:40	
11	Toshiyuki Hayata	Japan	1:04:55	
12	Ibrahim Seid	Ethiopia	1:05:19	
13	Faustino Reynoso	Mexico	1:05:34	
14	Gemechu Kebede	Ethiopia	1:05:36	
15	Koen Allaert	Belgium	1:05:41	
16	Mohamed Awol	Ethiopia	1:05:51	
17	Clint Verran	United States	1:05:56	
18	Satoshi Irifune	Japan	1:06:08	
19	George Mofokeng	South Africa	1:06:12	
20	Bethuel Netshifhefhe	South Africa	1:06:18	
21	Guy Fays	Belgium	1:06:21	
22	Jussi Utriainen	Finland	1:06:25	
23	Diego Colorado	Colombia	1:06:27	
24	Christian Nemeth	Belgium	1:06:33	
25	João Lopes	Portugal	1:06:33	
26	José de Souza	Brazil	1:06:37	
27	El-Arbi Khattabi	Morocco	1:06:43	
28	Ronny Ligneel	Belgium	1:06:49	
29	Mohamed Serbouti	France	1:07:01	
30	Antonio Peña	Spain	1:07:11	
31	Fidencio Torres	Mexico	1:07:15	
32	Migidio Bourifa	Italy	1:07:17	
33	Mostafa Errebbah	Morocco	1:07:19	
34	Rachid Aït Bensalem	Morocco	1:07:23	
35	Janne Holmén	Finland	1:07:32	
36	Daniele Caimmi	Italy	1:07:38	
37	Andrew Letherby	Australia	1:07:38	
38	Jun Shida	Japan	1:07:41	
39	Herder Vázquez	Colombia	1:07:55	
40	Motsehi Moeketsane	South Africa	1:07:58	
41	Scott Westcott	Australia	1:08:04	
42	Stéphane Hannot	France	1:08:08	
43	Shaun Creighton	Australia	1:08:12	
44	Abdelhadi Habassa	Morocco	1:08:16	
45	Amar Dahbi	Algeria	1:08:17	
46	Andrés Espinosa	Mexico	1:08:23	
47	Dale Warrender	New Zealand	1:08:31	
48	Iván Sánchez	Spain	1:08:36	
49	Frédéric Collignon	Belgium	1:08:45	
50	Saïd Belhout	Algeria	1:08:46	
51	Zarislav Gapeyenko	Belarus	1:08:57	
52	Matthew Vaux-Harvey	Great Britain	1:09:20	
53	Denis Curzi	Italy	1:09:36	
54	Thabiso Moqhali	Lesotho	1:09:46	PB
55	Alvaro Neuta	Colombia	1:09:47	
56	Teddy Mitchell	United States	1:09:48	
57	Todd Reeser	United States	1:09:52	
58	Johnny Loría	Costa Rica	1:09:58	
59	Ernest Ndjissipou	Central African Republic	1:10:13	
60	Abdel Krim Benzai	Algeria	1:10:21	
61	Brahim El-Ghazali	France	1:10:33	
62	Vladimir Tsyamchik	Belarus	1:10:41	
63	Siphesihle Mdluli	Swaziland	1:10:43	
64	Makhosonke Fika	South Africa	1:11:08	
65	Marco Antonio Condori	Bolivia	1:11:21	
66	Pat Carroll	Australia	1:11:28	
67	Ivica Škopac	Croatia	1:11:40	
68	Leonardo Guedes	Brazil	1:11:49	
69	Dieudonné Disi	Rwanda	1:11:52	
70	Nick Wetheridge	Great Britain	1:12:00	
71	Ronald Arias	El Salvador	1:12:04	
72	Jeff Campbell	United States	1:12:06	
73	Jiří Hnilička	Czech Republic	1:12:23	
74	Juan Ramos	Guatemala	1:13:02	
75	Elisvaldo de Carvalho	Brazil	1:13:27	
76	Drago Paripović	Croatia	1:13:28	
77	Simón Alvarado	Panama	1:13:30	
78	Percy Sephoda	Lesotho	1:13:42	
79	Andrey Gordeyev	Belarus	1:13:52	
80	Simon Labiche	Seychelles	1:14:15	
81	Nick Jones	Great Britain	1:14:23	
82	Tau Khotso	Lesotho	1:14:54	
83	Leonid Pykhteyev	Kyrgyzstan	1:15:12	
84	Edwin Medina	Puerto Rico	1:15:25	
85	Kim Reynierse	Aruba	1:15:58	
86	Tatsumi Morimasa	Japan	1:16:19	
87	Nedeljko Ravić	Croatia	1:16:35	
88	Gonzalo Iquite	Guatemala	1:16:50	
89	Parakhat Kurtgeldiyev	Turkmenistan	1:17:04	
90	Khalid Al-Estashi	Yemen	1:17:11	
91	Freddy Nystad	Aruba	1:17:36	
92	Lee Kar Lun	Hong Kong	1:18:11	
93	Khasan Rakhimov	Uzbekistan	1:18:19	
94	Mohamed Al-Khawlani	Yemen	1:18:36	
95	Vasiliy Medvedev	Uzbekistan	1:19:40	
96	Djamched Rasulov	Tajikistan	1:20:04	
97	Sergey Zabavskiy	Tajikistan	1:22:25	
98	Richard Rodriguez	Aruba	1:24:32	
99	Chokirjon Irmatov	Tajikistan	1:30:35	
100	Fouad Obad	Yemen	2:55:54	
—	Azzedine Sakhri	Algeria	DNF	
—	Vahagn Hovanesyan	Armenia	DNF	
—	Hayk Khojumyan	Armenia	DNF	
—	Alvin Ras	Aruba	DNF	
—	Marco Ivan Condori	Bolivia	DNF	
—	Israel dos Anjos	Brazil	DNF	
—	Manuel Peñaherrera	Ecuador	DNF	
—	Néstor Quinapanta	Ecuador	DNF	
—	Abdellah Béhar	France	DNF	
—	Moulay Ali Ouadih	France	DNF	
—	Fermin Sequén	Guatemala	DNF	
—	Giuliano Battocletti	Italy	DNF	
—	Philip Rugut	Kenya	DNF	
—	Denis Bagrev	Kyrgyzstan	DNF	
—	Arkadiy Tolstyn/Nikitin	Kyrgyzstan	DNF	
—	David Galván	Mexico	DNF	
—	Enrique Montiel	Mexico	DNF	
—	Joseph Nsengiyumya	Rwanda	DNF	
—	Aaron Gabonewe	South Africa	DNF	
—	Jerry Lawson	United States	DNF	
—	Yevgeniy Nujdin	Uzbekistan	DNF	
—	Franklin Tenorio	Ecuador	DNS	

=== Women's ===
Rank	Athlete	Nationality	Time	Notes
1st place, gold medalist(s)	Paula Radcliffe	Great Britain	1:09:07	
2nd place, silver medalist(s)	Susan Chepkemei	Kenya	1:09:40	
3rd place, bronze medalist(s)	Lidia Șimon	Romania	1:10:24	
4	Mizuki Noguchi	Japan	1:11:11	
5	Pamela Chepchumba	Kenya	1:11:33	
6	Mihaela Botezan	Romania	1:11:52	
7	Cristina Pomacu	Romania	1:12:06	
8	Yukiko Okamoto	Japan	1:12:20	
9	Yasuko Hashimoto	Japan	1:12:54	
10	Milena Glusac	United States	1:13:53	
11	Lidiya Grigoryeva	Russia	1:14:26	
12	Stine Larsen	Norway	1:14:39	
13	Galina Aleksandrova	Russia	1:15:02	
14	Selma dos Reis	Brazil	1:15:16	
15	Wilma van Onna	Netherlands	1:15:17	
16	Fumi Murata	Japan	1:15:52	
17	Aster Demissie	Ethiopia	1:15:52	
18	María Luisa Muñoz	Spain	1:15:54	
19	Sarah Wilkinson	Great Britain	1:15:55	
20	Abebe Tola	Ethiopia	1:15:59	
21	Gitte Karlshøj	Denmark	1:16:01	
22	Zinaida Semyonova	Russia	1:16:13	
23	Kristin Beaney	United States	1:16:20	
24	Rocío Ríos	Spain	1:16:25	
25	Annemette Jensen	Denmark	1:16:26	
26	Carlien Cornelissen	South Africa	1:16:27	
27	Meseret Kotu	Ethiopia	1:16:29	
28	Hafida Gadi-Richard	France	1:16:45	
29	Shireen Crumpton	New Zealand	1:16:48	
30	Silvia Skvortsova	Russia	1:16:57	
31	Alina Tecuţă/Gherasim	Romania	1:17:16	
32	Dorota Gruca-Giezek	Poland	1:17:27	
33	Margaríta Tapía	Mexico	1:17:34	
34	Jana Klimešová	Czech Republic	1:18:06	
35	Shelly Steely	United States	1:18:50	
36	Theresa du Toit	South Africa	1:19:15	
37	Dulce María Rodríguez	Mexico	1:19:23	
38	Sibongile Ngcongwane	South Africa	1:19:44	
39	Leila Aman	Ethiopia	1:19:49	
40	Liliana Merlo	Mexico	1:19:58	
41	Nuta Olaru	Romania	1:20:00	
42	Kelly Keeler	United States	1:21:51	
43	Souad Aït Salem	Algeria	1:22:33	
44	Nili Avramski	Israel	1:22:58	
45	Andrea Green	Great Britain	1:24:53	
46	Catherine Maapela	South Africa	1:27:08	
47	Lourdes Cruz	Puerto Rico	1:27:59	
48	Kristinka Marković	Croatia	1:29:11	
49	Elsa Monterroso	Guatemala	1:30:30	
50	Angelina Cornelio	Guatemala	1:30:57	
51	Herlinda Xol	Guatemala	1:32:09	
52	Tijana Pavičić	Croatia	1:33:45	
53	Slavica Brčić	Croatia	1:38:33	
54	Anna Markelova	Turkmenistan	1:41:58	
—	Josiane Aboungono	Gabon	DNF	
—	Adriana Fernández	Mexico	DNF	
—	Omara Loza	Nicaragua	DNF	
—	Sandra Arroyo	Puerto Rico	DNF	
—	Louisa Leballo	South Africa	DNF	
—	Leyla Dzhumayeva	Turkmenistan	DNF	
—	Kelly Cordell	United States	DNF	
—	Wilma Guerra	Ecuador	DNS	

== Team Results ==
=== Men's ===
Rank	Country	Team	Time
1st place, gold medalist(s)	Kenya	Paul Tergat; Joseph Kimani; David Ruto	3:11:38
2nd place, silver medalist(s)	Ethiopia	Tesfaye Jifar; Ibrahim Seid; Gemechu Kebede	3:14:45
3rd place, bronze medalist(s)	Belgium	Koen Allaert; Guy Fays; Christian Nemeth	3:18:35
4	Japan	Toshiyuki Hayata; Satoshi Irifune; Jun Shida	3:18:44
5	Italy	Marco Mazza; Migidio Bourifa; Daniele Caimmi	3:19:21
6	Spain	Óscar Fernández; Antonio Peña; Iván Sánchez	3:20:12
7	South Africa	George Mofokeng; Bethuel Netshifhefhe; Motsehi Moeketsane	3:20:28
8	Mexico	Faustino Reynoso; Fidencio Torres; Andrés Espinosa	3:21:12
9	Morocco	El-Arbi Khattabi; Mostafa Errebbah; Rachid Aït Bensalem	3:21:25
10	Algeria	Noureddine Betim; Amar Dahbi; Saïd Belhout	3:21:43
11	Australia	Andrew Letherby; Scott Westcott; Shaun Creighton	3:23:54
12	Colombia	Diego Colorado; Herder Vázquez; Alvaro Neuta	3:24:09
13	United States	Clint Verran; Teddy Mitchell; Todd Reeser	3:25:36
14	France	Mohamed Serbouti; Stéphane Hannot; Brahim El-Ghazali	3:25:42
15	Brazil	José de Souza; Leonardo Guedes; Elisvaldo de Carvalho	3:31:53
16	Belarus	Zarislav Gapeyenko; Vladimir Tsyamchik; Andrey Gordeyev	3:33:30
17	Great Britain	Matthew Vaux-Harvey; Nick Wetheridge; Nick Jones	3:35:43
18	Lesotho	Thabiso Moqhali; Percy Sephoda; Tau Khotso	3:38:22
19	Croatia	Ivica Škopac; Drago Paripović; Nedeljko Ravić	3:41:43
20	Aruba	Kim Reynierse; Freddy Nystad; Richard Rodriguez	3:58:06
21	Tajikistan	Djamched Rasulov; Sergey Zabavskiy; Chokirjon Irmatov	4:13:04
22	Yemen	Khalid Al-Estashi; Mohamed Al-Khawlani; Fouad Obad	2:38:42
—	Guatemala	Juan Ramos; Gonzalo Iquite; Fermin Sequén	DNF
—	Kyrgyzstan	Leonid Pykhteyev; Denis Bagrev; Arkadiy Tolstyn/Nikitin	DNF
—	Uzbekistan	Khasan Rakhimov; Vasiliy Medvedev; Yevgeniy Nujdin	DNF

=== Women's ===
Rank	Country	Team	Time
1st place, gold medalist(s)	Romania	Lidia Șimon; Mihaela Botezan; Cristina Pomacu	3:34:22
2nd place, silver medalist(s)	Japan	Mizuki Noguchi; Yukiko Okamoto; Yasuko Hashimoto	3:36:25
3rd place, bronze medalist(s)	Russia	Lidiya Grigoryeva; Galina Aleksandrova; Zinaida Semyonova	3:45:41
4	Ethiopia	Aster Demissie; Abebe Tola; Meseret Kotu	3:48:20
5	United States	Milena Glusac; Kristin Beaney; Shelly Steely	3:49:03
6	Great Britain	Paula Radcliffe; Sarah Wilkinson; Andrea Green	3:49:55
7	South Africa	Carlien Cornelissen; Theresa du Toit; Sibongile Ngcongwane	3:55:26
8	Mexico	Margaríta Tapía; Dulce María Rodríguez; Liliana Merlo	3:56:55
9	Guatemala	Elsa Monterroso; Angelina Cornelio; Herlinda Xol	4:33:36
10	Croatia	Kristinka Marković; Tijana Pavičić; Slavica Brčić	4:41:29

== Participation ==
The participation of 182 athletes (121 men/61 women) from 52 countries is reported.

- Algeria (6)
- Armenia (2)
- Aruba (4)
- Australia (4)
- Belarus (3)
- Belgium (5)
- Bolivia (2)
- Brazil (5)
- Central African Republic (1)
- Colombia (3)
- Costa Rica (1)
- Croatia (6)
- Czech Republic (2)
- Denmark (2)
- Ecuador (2)
- El Salvador (1)
- Ethiopia (8)
- Finland (2)
- France (6)
- Gabon (1)
- Guatemala (6)
- Hong Kong (1)
- Israel (1)
- Italy (5)
- Japan (8)
- Kenya (7)
- Kyrgyzstan (3)
- Lesotho (3)
- Morocco (4)
- Mexico (9)
- Netherlands (1)
- New Zealand (2)
- Nicaragua (1)
- Norway (1)
- Panama (1)
- Poland (1)
- Portugal (1)
- Puerto Rico (3)
- Romania (5)
- Russia (4)
- Rwanda (2)
- Seychelles (1)
- South Africa (10)
- Spain (5)
- Swaziland (1)
- Tajikistan (3)
- Tanzania (2)
- Turkmenistan (3)
- United Kingdom (6)
- United States (10)
- Uzbekistan (3)
- Yemen (3)

== See also ==
- 2000 in athletics (track and field)
