= 2004 in the sport of athletics =

2004 in athletics
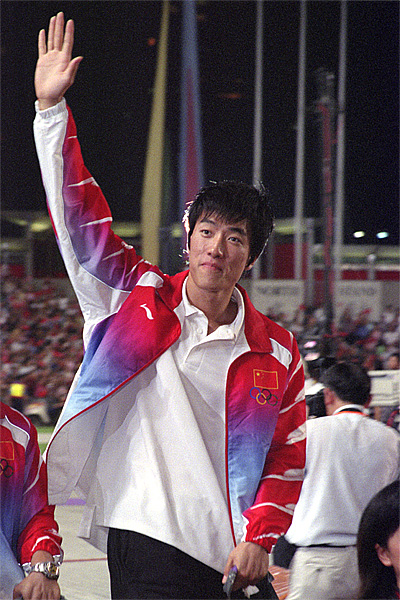
- Hurdler Liu Xiang became Olympic champion and world record holder in 2004.
- Major world events: Olympic Games
- World records set: 7
- IAAF Athletes of the Year: Kenenisa Bekele; Yelena Isinbayeva

This article contains an overview of the sport of athletics, including track and field, cross country and road running, in the year 2004.

The major competition of the year was the 2004 Summer Olympics. At the event, Yelena Isinbayeva cleared a world record 4.91 m in the pole vault. Liu Xiang won the men's 110 metres hurdles with a world record-equalling time of 12.91 seconds, defying traditional beliefs about the physical calibre of Chinese (and Asian) sprint athletes. Hicham El Guerrouj capped off his prominent international career with two gold medals in the 1500 m and 5000 m. The Olympic competition in Athens was marred by an incident involving Greek Olympic medallists Konstantinos Kenteris and Ekaterini Thanou, who were alleged to have staged a motorcycle crash in order to avoid doping tests. Both athletes missed the competition and were later banned for missing three doping tests.

== Major events ==
=== World ===
- Olympic Games
- Summer Paralympics
- World Indoor Championships
- World Athletics Final
- World Cross Country Championships
- World Half Marathon Championships
- World Race Walking Cup
- IAAF Golden League

=== Regional ===
- African Championships
- Asian Indoor Championships
- Asian Cross Country Championships
- Pan Arab Games
- South Asian Games
- Balkan Games
- European Cross Country Championships
- European Cup
- European Mountain Running Championships
- Ibero-American Championships

== World records ==
=== Men ===
Event	Athlete	Nation	Performance	Meeting	Place	Date
5,000 metres	Kenenisa Bekele	Ethiopia	12:37.35		Hengelo, Netherlands	31 May
10,000 metres	Kenenisa Bekele	Ethiopia	26:20.31		Ostrava, Czech Republic	31 May
25 km (road)	Paul Malakwen Kosgei	Kenya	1:12:45		Berlin, Germany	9 May
110 m hurdles	Liu Xiang	China	12.91		Athens, Greece	27 August
3000 m steeplechase	Saif Saaeed Shaheen	Qatar	7:53.63		Brussels, Belgium	3 September

=== Women ===
Event	Athlete	Nation	Performance	Meeting	Place	Date
5,000 metres	Elvan Abeylegesse	Turkey	14:24.68		Bergen, Norway	11 June
3000 m steeplechase	Gulnara Samitova-Galkina	Russia	9:01.59		Heraklion, Greece	10 August
Pole vault	Yelena Isinbaeva	Russia	4.83 m		Donetsk, Ukraine	15 February
Pole vault	Svetlana Feofanova	Russia	4.85 m		Athens, Greece	22 February
Pole vault	Yelena Isinbaeva	Russia	4.86 m		Budapest, Hungary	6 March
Pole vault	Yelena Isinbaeva	Russia	4.87 m		Gateshead, United Kingdom	27 June
Pole vault	Svetlana Feofanova	Russia	4.88 m		Heraklion, Greece	4 July
Pole vault	Yelena Isinbaeva	Russia	4.89 m		Birmingham, United Kingdom	25 July
Pole vault	Yelena Isinbaeva	Russia	4.90 m		London, United Kingdom	30 July
Pole vault	Yelena Isinbaeva	Russia	4.91 m		Athens, Greece	24 August
Pole vault	Yelena Isinbaeva	Russia	4.92 m		Brussels, Belgium	3 September
Decathlon	Marie Collonvillé	France	8150 pts		Talence, France	25-26 September

== Season's bests ==
Best marks of the year
Event	Men			Women		
Event	Athlete	Mark	Notes	Athlete	Mark	Notes
60 metres	Jason Gardener (GBR)	6.46		Yuliya Tabakova (RUS)	7.06	
100 metres	Justin Gatlin (USA)	9.85		Ivet Lalova (BUL)	10.77	
200 metres	Shawn Crawford (USA)	19.79		Veronica Campbell-Brown (JAM)	22.05	
400 metres	Jeremy Wariner (USA)	44.00		Tonique Williams-Darling (BAH)	49.07	
800 metres	Wilfred Bungei (KEN)	1:43.06		Tatyana Andrianova (RUS)	1:56.23	
1500 metres	Bernard Lagat (KEN)	3:27.40		Kelly Holmes (GBR)	3:57.90	
3000 metres	Eliud Kipchoge (KEN)	7:27.72		Isabella Ochichi (KEN)	8:31.32	
5000 metres	Kenenisa Bekele (ETH)	12:37.35	WR	Elvan Abeylegesse (TUR)	14:24.68	
10,000 metres	Kenenisa Bekele (ETH)	26:20.31	WR	Paula Radcliffe (GBR)	30:17.15	
60 metres hurdles	Allen Johnson (USA)	7.36		Perdita Felicien (CAN)	7.75	
100/110 metres hurdles	Liu Xiang (CHN)	12.91	WR=	Joanna Hayes (USA)	12.37	
400 metres hurdles	Félix Sánchez (DOM)	47.63		Faní Halkiá (GRE)	52.77	
3000 metres steeplechase	Saif Saaeed Shaheen (QAT)	7:53.63	WR	Gulnara Galkina (RUS)	9:01.59	WR
10 kilometres	Gilbert Okari (KEN)	27:35		Lornah Kiplagat (NED)	30:41	
15 kilometres	Sileshi Sihine (ETH)	41:38		Lydia Cheromei (KEN)	47:02	
20 kilometres	Salah Hissou (MAR)	57:54		Mizuki Noguchi (JPN)	1:04:19	
Half marathon	Robert Kipkoech Cheruiyot (KEN)	1:00:11		Mizuki Noguchi (JPN)	1:07:47	
25 kilometres	Paul Malakwen Kosgei (KEN)	1:12:45		Yoko Shibui (JPN)	1:22:32	
30 kilometres	Robert Kipkoech Cheruiyot (KEN); Evans Rutto (KEN)	1:29:08		Yoko Shibui (JPN)	1:39:07	
Marathon	Felix Limo (KEN)	2:06:14		Yoko Shibui (JPN)	2:19:41	
20 kilometres race walk	Vladimir Stankin (RUS)	1:17:23		Hongjuan Song (CHN)	1:26:46	
50 kilometres race walk	Denis Nizhegorodov (RUS)	3:35:29		—		
Pole vault	Timothy Mack (USA)	6.01 m		Yelena Isinbayeva (RUS)	4.92 m	WR
High jump	Stefan Holm (SWE)	2.37 m		Elena Slesarenko (RUS)	2.06 m	
Long jump	Dwight Phillips (USA)	8.60 m		Tatyana Lebedeva (RUS)	7.33 m	
Triple jump	Christian Olsson (SWE)	17.93 m	(indoor)	Tatyana Lebedeva (RUS)	15.36 m	WR (indoor)
Shot put	Christian Cantwell (USA)	22.54 m		Irina Korzhanenko (RUS)	20.79 m	
Discus throw	Virgilijus Alekna (LTU)	70.97 m		Iryna Yatchenko (BLR)	69.14 m	
Javelin throw	Aleksandr Ivanov (RUS)	87.73 m		Olisdeilys Menéndez (CUB)	71.53 m	
Hammer throw	Ivan Tsikhan (BLR)	84.46 m		Yipsi Moreno (CUB)	75.18 m	
Pentathlon	—			Naide Gomes (POR)	4759 pts	
Heptathlon	Roman Šebrle (CZE)	6438 pts	AR	Carolina Klüft (SWE)	6952 pts	
Decathlon	Roman Šebrle (CZE)	8893 pts		—		
4×100 metres relay	United States; Shawn Crawford; Justin Gatlin; Coby Miller; Maurice Greene	37.92		Jamaica; Tanya Lawrence; Sherone Simpson; Aleen Bailey; Veronica Campbell-Brown	41.73	
4×400 metres relay	United States; Otis Harris; Derrick Brew; Jeremy Wariner; Darold Williamson	2:55.91		Russia; Olesya Forsheva; Natalya Nazarova; Olesya Zykina; Natalya Antyukh	3:20.16	

== Awards ==
=== Men ===
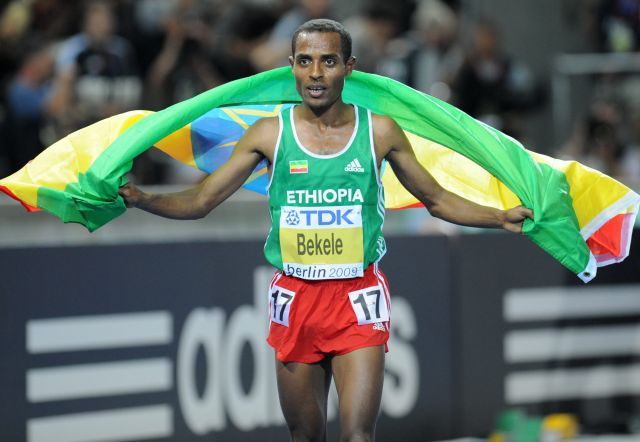
Kenenisa Bekele topped the global award polls.

Award	Winner
IAAF World Athlete of the Year	Kenenisa Bekele (ETH)
Track & Field Athlete of the Year	Kenenisa Bekele (ETH)
European Athlete of the Year Award	Christian Olsson (SWE)
Best Male Track Athlete ESPY Award	Tom Pappas (USA)

=== Women ===
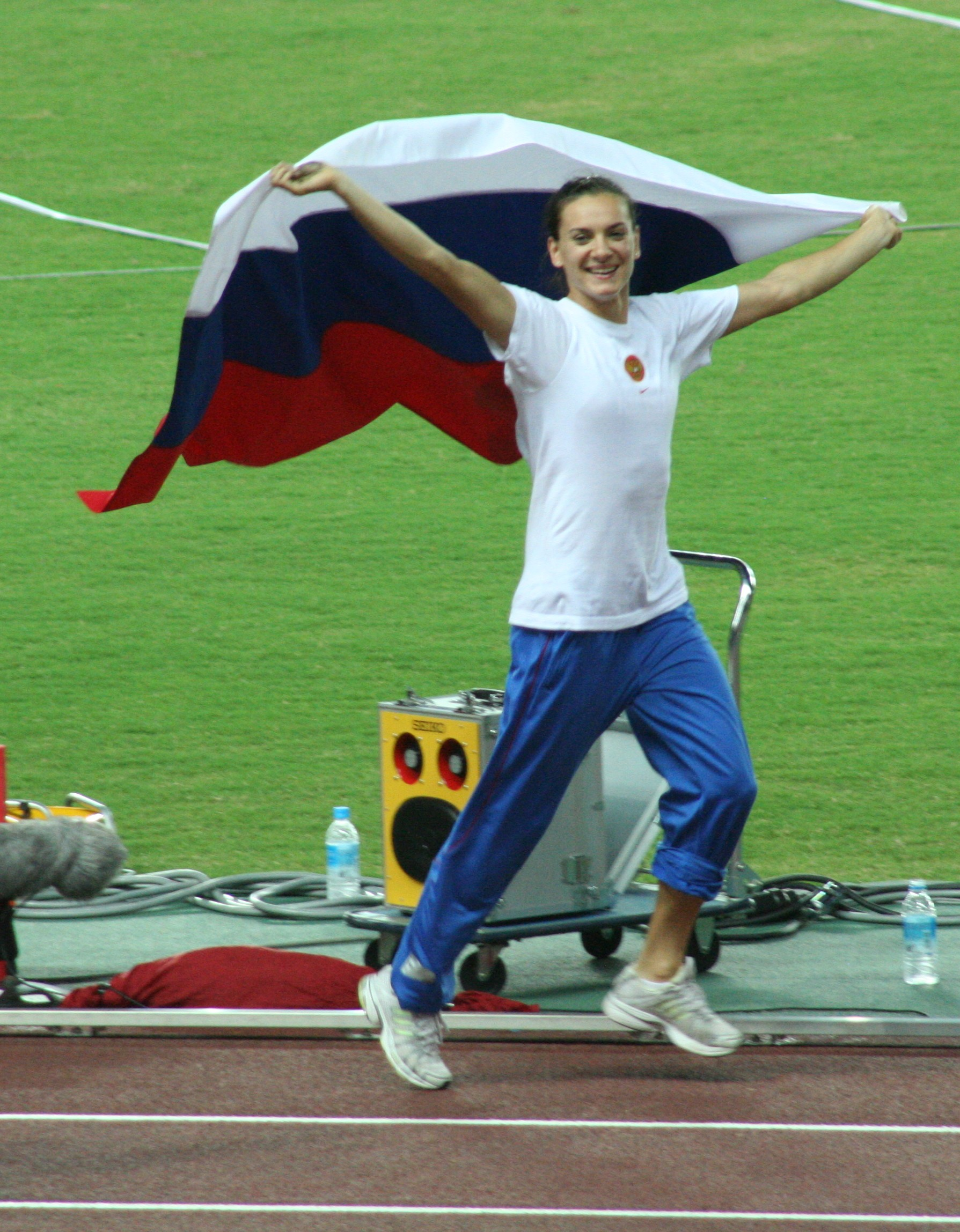
Yelena Isinbayeva was both the IAAF and Track & Field News award winner.

Award	Winner
IAAF World Athlete of the Year	Yelena Isinbayeva (RUS)
Track & Field Athlete of the Year	Yelena Isinbayeva (RUS)
European Athlete of the Year Award	Kelly Holmes (GBR)
Best Female Track Athlete ESPY Award	Gail Devers (USA)

== Seasonal rankings by event ==
=== Men ===
==== 400 m Hurdles ====
RANK	2004 WORLD BEST PERFORMERS	TIME
1.	Félix Sánchez (DOM)	47.63
2.	James Carter (USA)	47.68
3.	Bershawn Jackson (USA)	47.86
4.	Danny McFarlane (JAM)	48.00
5.	Ockert Cilliers (RSA)	48.02

==== 3000 m Steeplechase ====
RANK	2004 WORLD BEST PERFORMERS	TIME
1.	Saif Saeed Shaheen (QAT)	7:53.63
2.	Paul Kipsiele Koech (KEN)	7:59.65
3.	Brahim Boulami (MAR)	8:02.66
4.	Ezekiel Kemboi (KEN)	8:02.98
5.	Brimin Kipruto (KEN)	8:05.52

==== Marathon ====
RANK	NAME ATHLETE	TIME	EVENT
1.	Evans Rutto (KEN)	2:06:16	Chicago Marathon
2.	Evans Rutto (KEN)	2:06:18	London Marathon
3.	Robert Cheboror (KEN)	2:06:22	Amsterdam Marathon
4.	Felix Limo (KEN)	2:06:44	Berlin Marathon
5.	Sammy Korir (KEN)	2:06:48	London Marathon
6.	Joseph Riri (KEN)	2:06:49	Berlin Marathon
7.	Joshua Chelanga (KEN)	2:07:05	Berlin Marathon
8.	Gert Thys (RSA)	2:07:06	Seoul International Marathon
9.	Jaouad Gharib (MAR)	2:07:12	London Marathon
10.	José Rios (ESP)	2:07:42	Otsu Marathon

==== Pole Vault ====
RANK	2004 WORLD BEST PERFORMERS	HEIGHT
1.	Timothy Mack (USA)	6.01 m
2.	Toby Stevenson (USA)	6.00 m
3.	Jeff Hartwig (USA)	5.86 m
4.	Giuseppe Gibilisco (ITA)	5.85 m
4.	Aleksandr Averbukh (ISR)	5.85 m

=== Women ===
==== 100 metres ====
RANK	2004 WORLD BEST PERFORMERS	TIME
1.	Ivet Lalova (BUL)	10.77
2.	Veronica Campbell (JAM)	10.91
3.	Yulia Nestsiarenka (BLR)	10.92
4.	Christine Arron (FRA)	10.95
5.	Lauryn Williams (USA)	10.96

==== 200 metres ====
RANK	2004 WORLD BEST PERFORMERS	TIME
1.	Veronica Campbell (JAM)	22.05
2.	Allyson Felix (USA)	22.18
3.	Debbie Ferguson (BAH)	22.30
4.	Aleen Bailey (JAM)	22.33
5.	Tonette Dyer (USA)	22.34
5.	Irina Khabarova (RUS)	22.34

==== Half Marathon ====
RANK	2004 WORLD BEST PERFORMERS	TIME
1.	Benita Johnson (AUS)	1:07:55

==== 100 m Hurdles ====
RANK	2004 WORLD BEST PERFORMERS	TIME
1.	Joanna Hayes (USA)	12.37
2.	Yelena Krasovskaya (UKR)	12.45
3.	Perdita Felicien (CAN)	12.46
4.	Gail Devers (USA)	12.50
5.	Delloreen Ennis-London (JAM)	12.51

==== 400 m Hurdles ====
RANK	2004 WORLD BEST PERFORMERS	TIME
1.	Faní Halkiá (GRE)	52.77
2.	Sheena Johnson (USA)	52.95
3.	Yuliya Pechonkina (RUS)	53.31
4.	Ionela Târlea-Manolache (ROM)	53.32
5.	Brenda Taylor (USA)	53.36

==== 3000 m Steeplechase ====
RANK	2004 WORLD BEST PERFORMERS	TIME
1.	Gulnara Samitova-Galkina (RUS)	9:01.59
2.	Lyubov Ivanova (RUS)	9:28.02
3.	Dorcus Inzikuru (UGA)	9:29.30
4.	Briana Shook (USA)	9:29.32
5.	Salome Chepchumba (KEN)	9:29.81

==== High Jump ====
RANK	2004 WORLD BEST PERFORMERS	HEIGHT
1.	Yelena Slesarenko (RUS)	2.06 m
2.	Hestrie Cloete (RSA)	2.04 m
3.	Blanka Vlašić (CRO)	2.03 m
4.	Viktoriya Styopina (UKR)	2.02 m
5.	Iryna Mykhalchenko (UKR)	2.01 m
5.	Venelina Veneva (BUL)	2.01 m

==== Pole Vault ====
RANK	2004 WORLD BEST PERFORMERS	HEIGHT
1.	Yelena Isinbayeva (RUS)	4.92 m
2.	Svetlana Feofanova (RUS)	4.88 m
3.	Stacy Dragila (USA)	4.83 m
4.	Tatyana Polnova (RUS)	4.78 m
5.	Monika Pyrek (POL)	4.72 m

==== Heptathlon ====
RANK	2004 WORLD BEST PERFORMERS	POINTS
1.	Carolina Klüft (SWE)	6952
2.	Svetlana Sokolova (RUS)	6594
3.	Austra Skujyté (LTU)	6435
4.	Kelly Sotherton (GBR)	6424
5.	Nataliya Dobrynska (UKR)	6387

==== Marathon ====
RANK	NAME ATHLETE	TIME	EVENT
1.	Yoko Shibui (JPN)	2:19:41	Berlin Marathon
2.	Margaret Okayo (KEN)	2:22:35	London Marathon
3.	Paula Radcliffe (GBR)	2:23:10	New York Marathon
4.	Susan Chepkemei (KEN)	2:23:13	New York Marathon
5.	Hiromi Ominami (JPN)	2:23:26	Berlin Marathon
6.	Zhou Chunxiu (CHN)	2:23:28	Xiamen Marathon
7.	Constantina Tomescu (ROM)	2:23:45	Chicago Marathon
8.	Reiko Tosa (JPN)	2:23:57	Nagoya Marathon
9.	Sun Yingjie (CHN)	2:24:11	Beijing Marathon
10.	Catherine Ndereba (KEN)	2:24:27	Boston Marathon

== Deaths ==
- April 23 – Manuel Alcalde (47), Spanish race walker (b. 1956)
- December 4 – June Maston (76), Australian sprinter and athletics coach (b. 1928)
- December 25 – Ian Syster (28), South African long-distance runner (b. 1976)
