= 2001 IAAF World Half Marathon Championships =

- Organisers: IAAF
- Edition: 10th
- Date: 7 October
- Host city: Bristol, South West England, United Kingdom
- Events: 2
- Participation: 200 athletes from 52 nations

The 10th IAAF World Half Marathon Championships was held on 7 October 2001 in the city of Bristol, UK, and was run immediately before that year's Bristol Half Marathon. A total of 200 athletes, 125 men and 75 women, from 52 countries took part. Detailed reports on the event and an appraisal of the results were given.

Complete results were published for men, for women, for men's team, and for women's team.

== Medallists ==
Event	Gold		Silver		Bronze	
Individual
Men	Haile Gebrselassie (ETH)	1:00:03	Tesfaye Jifar (ETH)	1:00:04	John Yuda (TAN)	1:00:12
Women	Paula Radcliffe (GBR)	1:06:47	Susan Chepkemei (KEN)	1:07:36	Berhane Adere (ETH)	1:08:17
Team
Team Men	Ethiopia	3:00:31	Kenya	3:02:53	Tanzania	3:05:08
Team Women	Kenya	3:28:04	Japan	3:30:08	Ethiopia	3:30:20

== Race results ==
=== Men's ===
Rank	Athlete	Nationality	Time	Notes
1st place, gold medalist(s)	Haile Gebrselassie	Ethiopia	1:00:03	PB
2nd place, silver medalist(s)	Tesfaye Jifar	Ethiopia	1:00:04	PB
3rd place, bronze medalist(s)	John Yuda	Tanzania	1:00:12	PB
4	Hendrick Ramaala	South Africa	1:00:15	
5	Tesfaye Tola	Ethiopia	1:00:24	PB
6	Evans Rutto	Kenya	1:00:43	
7	Peter Kiplagat Chebet	Kenya	1:00:56	PB
8	Christopher Cheboiboch	Kenya	1:01:14	
9	Jaouad Gharib	Morocco	1:01:41	
10	Khalid Skah	Morocco	1:01:41	
11	Salah Hissou	Morocco	1:01:56	PB
12	Faustin Baha	Tanzania	1:02:15	
13	John Gwako	Kenya	1:02:15	PB
14	Abner Chipu	South Africa	1:02:18	
15	Mostafa Errebbah	Italy	1:02:19	PB
16	Haron Toroitich	Kenya	1:02:27	
17	Takeshi Hamano	Japan	1:02:28	PB
18	Abdelhadi Habassa	Morocco	1:02:30	PB
19	Rachid Ziar	Algeria	1:02:32	
20	Tiyapo Maso	Botswana	1:02:33	
21	Matt O'Dowd	Great Britain	1:02:40	
22	Benedict Ako	Tanzania	1:02:41	
23	Eduardo Henriques	Portugal	1:02:44	
24	Kazuo Ietani	Japan	1:02:46	
25	Lahoussine Mrikik	Morocco	1:02:54	
26	Zebedayo Bayo	Tanzania	1:02:55	
27	George Mofokeng	South Africa	1:02:57	
28	Janne Holmén	Finland	1:03:01	PB
29	Róbert Štefko	Slovakia	1:03:03	
30	Abel Chimukoko	Zimbabwe	1:03:04	PB
31	Noureddine Betim	Algeria	1:03:05	PB
32	Paulo Guerra	Portugal	1:03:06	
33	Scott Larson	United States	1:03:08	PB
34	Daniele Caimmi	Italy	1:03:16	
35	Francis Yiga	Uganda	1:03:23	PB
36	Paul Wakou	Uganda	1:03:27	PB
37	Takashi Ota	Japan	1:03:28	
38	José Carlos Adán	Spain	1:03:33	PB
39	Jean-François Bertron	France	1:03:34	
40	Yuki Mori	Japan	1:03:36	
41	Norman Dlomo	South Africa	1:03:38	
42	Abdelghani Lahlali	France	1:03:39	
43	Ignacio Cáceres	Spain	1:03:42	PB
44	Fidencio Torres	Mexico	1:03:48	PB
45	Gabalebe Moloko	Botswana	1:03:55	
46	Antonio Silio	Argentina	1:03:56	
47	Venry Hamalila	Zambia	1:03:56	PB
48	Medison Chibwe	Zambia	1:03:57	PB
49	Saïd Belhout	Algeria	1:03:58	PB
50	Ottaviano Andriani	Italy	1:04:00	
51	Nick Jones	Great Britain	1:04:00	
52	Aguelmis Rojas	Cuba	1:04:13	
53	Takayuki Matsumiya	Japan	1:04:16	
54	Kabo Gabaseme	Botswana	1:04:20	
55	Augusto Gomes	France	1:04:21	
56	Domingos Castro	Portugal	1:04:22	
57	Dan Robinson	Great Britain	1:04:23	PB
58	Jeff Campbell	United States	1:04:24	PB
59	Abdel Hak Lebouazda	Algeria	1:04:25	
60	Christian Nemeth	Belgium	1:04:26	
61	Luíz dos Santos	Brazil	1:04:26	PB
62	Dereje Kebede	Ethiopia	1:04:30	PB
63	Ronny Ligneel	Belgium	1:04:30	PB
64	Zarislav Gapeyenko	Belarus	1:04:31	PB
65	Pavel Faschingbauer	Czech Republic	1:04:37	
66	Manuel Teixeira	Brazil	1:04:42	PB
67	José de Souza	Brazil	1:04:48	PB
68	Dan Browne	United States	1:04:56	
69	Simon Mpholo	South Africa	1:05:13	
70	Wodage Zvadya	Israel	1:05:16	
71	José de Jesús	Mexico	1:05:18	
72	Alejandro Gómez	Spain	1:05:23	
73	Frédéric Collignon	Belgium	1:05:27	
74	David Ramard	France	1:05:30	
75	Kassa Tadesse	Great Britain	1:05:39	
76	Joseph Nsubuga	Uganda	1:05:41	
77	Andrey Gordeyev	Belarus	1:05:47	
78	Migidio Bourifa	Italy	1:05:48	
79	Adamou Aboubakar	Cameroon	1:05:49	
80	Andrew Morgan-Lee	Great Britain	1:05:51	
81	Siphesihle Mdluli	Swaziland	1:05:59	
82	Takhir Mamashayev	Belarus	1:06:10	
83	Carlos Jaramillo	Chile	1:06:22	PB
84	Procopio Franco	Mexico	1:06:33	
85	Vincent Hatuleke	Zambia	1:06:33	PB
86	José Amaro Lourenço	Angola	1:06:56	PB
87	Ernest Ndjissipou	Central African Republic	1:06:56	PB
88	José Alberto Montenegro	Argentina	1:07:03	
89	Leonidas Rivadeneira	Chile	1:07:16	
90	Valentim Naúle	Angola	1:07:17	
91	Arkadiy Tolstyn/Nikitin	Kyrgyzstan	1:07:18	
92	Giovanni Gualdi	Italy	1:07:22	
93	Simon Labiche	Seychelles	1:07:24	PB
94	Moulay Ali Ouadih	France	1:07:32	
95	Vasiliy Medvedev	Uzbekistan	1:07:57	
96	Clint Verran	United States	1:08:04	
97	Yevgeniy Medvednikov	Kazakhstan	1:08:10	
98	Christian Rogelio	Chile	1:08:12	
99	Kavin Smith	Bermuda	1:08:17	PB
100	Khimu Giri	Nepal	1:09:09	PB
101	Tau Khotso	Lesotho	1:09:10	PB
102	Eric Vamben	Mauritius	1:09:24	PB
103	Daniel Ferreira	Brazil	1:09:25	
104	Carlos Cangengele	Angola	1:09:55	
105	Khasan Rakhimov	Uzbekistan	1:10:07	
106	Denis Bagrev	Kyrgyzstan	1:10:12	
107	Mathieu Kouanotso	Cameroon	1:10:43	
108	Judex Durhone	Mauritius	1:11:04	
109	Joseph Simuchimba	Zambia	1:11:39	
110	Dovran Amandjayev	Turkmenistan	1:13:42	
111	Sergey Anokhin	Azerbaijan	1:14:19	
112	Agzam Aliyev	Uzbekistan	1:15:32	
113	Yamil Iskanderov	Azerbaijan	1:15:51	
114	Kemal Tuvakuliyev	Turkmenistan	1:16:19	
115	Dovletgeldi Hangeldiyev	Turkmenistan	1:17:37	
116	Kun Sio Pan	Macau	1:18:31	
117	Abdulla Moosa	Maldives	1:25:45	PB
—	Mustapha Benacer	Algeria	DNF	
—	Guy Fays	Belgium	DNF	
—	Roland Inack	Cameroon	DNF	
—	Alemayehu Girma	Ethiopia	DNF	
—	David Galván	Mexico	DNF	
—	Germán Silva	Mexico	DNF	
—	Alfred Shemweta	Sweden	DNF	
—	Mike Donnelly	United States	DNF	
—	Mamadou Alpha Barry	Guinea	DNS	
—	Souleymane Camara	Guinea	DNS	
—	Layedjan Diaby	Guinea	DNS	
—	Abdou Rahim Diallo	Guinea	DNS	
—	Ibrahim Diallo	Guinea	DNS	
—	António Pinto	Portugal	DNS	
—	Ahmed Al-Azzi	Yemen	DNS	
—	Mohammed Al-Khawlani	Yemen	DNS	
—	Fuad Obad	Yemen	DNS	

=== Women's ===
Rank	Athlete	Nationality	Time	Notes
1st place, gold medalist(s)	Paula Radcliffe	Great Britain	1:06:47	CR
2nd place, silver medalist(s)	Susan Chepkemei	Kenya	1:07:36	PB
3rd place, bronze medalist(s)	Berhane Adere	Ethiopia	1:08:17	PB
4	Mizuki Noguchi	Japan	1:08:23	PB
5	Jeļena Prokopčuka/Čelnova	Latvia	1:08:43	PB
6	Elana Meyer	South Africa	1:08:56	PB
7	Olivera Jevtić	Yugoslavia	1:09:51	PB
8	Isabella Ochichi	Kenya	1:10:01	
9	Yasuyo Iwamoto	Japan	1:10:06	PB
10	Mihaela Botezan	Romania	1:10:11	
11	Nuta Olaru	Romania	1:10:27	
12	Caroline Kwambai	Kenya	1:10:27	
13	Lyudmila Biktasheva	Russia	1:10:31	PB
14	Aurica Buia	Romania	1:10:40	PB
15	Restituta Joseph	Tanzania	1:10:43	
16	Viktoriya Klimina	Russia	1:10:46	
17	Meseret Kotu	Ethiopia	1:10:48	PB
18	Joyce Chepchumba	Kenya	1:11:03	
19	Lyubov Morgunova	Russia	1:11:06	
20	Teyba Erkesso	Ethiopia	1:11:15	PB
21	Magdeline Chemjor	Kenya	1:11:26	
22	Iulia Olteanu/Negura	Romania	1:11:28	
23	Liz Yelling	Great Britain	1:11:29	PB
24	Milena Glusac	United States	1:11:34	PB
25	Takako Kotorida	Japan	1:11:39	
26	Beáta Rakonczai	Hungary	1:12:08	PB
27	Simona Staicu	Hungary	1:12:11	PB
28	Silvia Sommaggio	Italy	1:12:14	PB
29	Irina Safarova	Russia	1:12:17	
30	Maria Baldaia	Brazil	1:12:45	PB
31	Annie Emmerson	Great Britain	1:13:00	PB
32	Constantina Diţă-Tomescu	Romania	1:13:08	
33	María Luisa Muñoz	Spain	1:13:12	
34	Erika Csomor	Hungary	1:13:58	
35	Gloria Marconi	Italy	1:13:59	
36	Sylvia Mosqueda	United States	1:14:04	
37	Anikó Kálovics	Hungary	1:14:04	PB
38	Tausi Juma	Tanzania	1:14:05	
39	Marizete Rezende	Brazil	1:14:13	PB
40	Hiromi Watanabe	Japan	1:14:22	
41	Annemette Jensen	Denmark	1:14:24	
42	Sandra Van Den Haesevelde	Belgium	1:14:33	
43	Susannah Beck	United States	1:14:40	
44	Dione dʼAgostini	Brazil	1:14:47	PB
45	Cathérine Lallemand	Belgium	1:15:03	PB
46	Charné Rademeyer	South Africa	1:15:06	PB
47	Monica Hostetler	United States	1:15:21	
48	Nili Avramski	Israel	1:15:30	PB
49	Patrizia Tisi	Italy	1:16:12	
50	Petra Kamínková/Drajzajtlová	Czech Republic	1:16:18	
51	Mariela González	Cuba	1:16:24	PB
52	Alison Holinka	United States	1:16:36	
53	María Luisa Lárraga	Spain	1:16:44	
54	Alla Zadorozhnaya	Belarus	1:16:48	
55	Margareth Iro	Tanzania	1:17:02	
56	Poppy Mlambo	South Africa	1:17:12	PB
57	Ann Parmentier	Belgium	1:17:13	
58	Célia dos Santos	Brazil	1:17:17	PB
59	Ronel Thomas	South Africa	1:17:50	PB
60	Florinda Andreucci	Italy	1:17:56	
61	Carlien Cornelissen	South Africa	1:18:29	PB
62	Lidia Karwowski	Brazil	1:18:31	PB
63	Natallia Kvachuk	Belarus	1:18:57	
64	Lourdes Cruz	Puerto Rico	1:19:41	PB
65	Natalia Bendzik	Belarus	1:22:00	
66	Yuliya Arfipova	Uzbekistan	1:22:26	
67	Irina Matrosova	Uzbekistan	1:22:39	
68	Yekaterina Shatnaya	Kazakhstan	1:23:46	
69	Alda Maurício	Angola	1:26:58	PB
70	Dildar Mamedova	Turkmenistan	1:31:46	
71	Yekaterina Dirova	Uzbekistan	1:33:57	
—	Beth Allott	Great Britain	DNF	
—	Birhan Dagne	Great Britain	DNF	
—	Asmae Leghzaoui	Morocco	DNF	
—	Galina Aleksandrova	Russia	DNF	

== Team results ==
=== Men's ===
Rank	Country	Team	Time
1st place, gold medalist(s)	Ethiopia	Haile Gebrselassie; Tesfaye Jifar; Tesfaye Tola	3:00:31
2nd place, silver medalist(s)	Kenya	Evans Rutto; Peter Chebet; Christopher Cheboiboch	3:02:53
3rd place, bronze medalist(s)	Tanzania	John Yuda; Faustin Baha; Benedict Ako	3:05:08
4	Morocco	Jaouad Gharib; Khalid Skah; Salah Hissou	3:05:18
5	South Africa	Hendrick Ramaala; Abner Chipu; George Mofokeng	3:05:30
6	Japan	Takeshi Hamano; Kazuo Ietani; Takashi Ota	3:08:42
7	Algeria	Rachid Ziar; Noureddine Betim; Saïd Belhout	3:09:35
8	Italy	Mostafa Errebbah; Daniele Caimmi; Ottaviano Andriani	3:09:35
9	Portugal	Eduardo Henriques; Paulo Guerra; Domingos Castro	3:10:12
10	Botswana	Tiyapo Maso; Gabalebe Moloko; Kabo Gabaseme	3:10:48
11	Great Britain	Matt O'Dowd; Nick Jones; Dan Robinson	3:11:03
12	France	Jean-François Bertron; Abdelghani Lahlali; Augusto Gomes	3:11:34
13	United States	Scott Larson; Jeff Campbell; Dan Browne	3:12:28
14	Uganda	Francis Yiga; Paul Wakou; Joseph Nsubuga	3:12:31
15	Spain	José Carlos Adán; Ignacio Cáceres; Alejandro Gómez	3:12:38
16	Brazil	Luíz dos Santos; Manuel Teixeira; José de Souza	3:13:56
17	Belgium	Christian Nemeth; Ronny Ligneel; Frédéric Collignon	3:14:23
18	Zambia	Venry Hamalila; Medison Chibwe; Vincent Hatuleke	3:14:26
19	Mexico	Fidencio Torres; José de Jesús; Procopio Franco	3:15:39
20	Belarus	Zarislav Gapeyenko; Andrey Gordeyev; Takhir Mamashayev	3:16:28
21	Chile	Carlos Jaramillo; Leonidas Rivadeneira; Christian Rogelio	3:21:50
22	Angola	José Amaro Lourenço; Valentim Naúle; Carlos Cangengele	3:24:08
23	Uzbekistan	Vasiliy Medvedev; Khasan Rakhimov; Agzam Aliyev	3:33:36
24	Turkmenistan	Dovran Amandjayev; Kemal Tuvakuliyev; Dovletgeldi Hangeldiyev	3:47:38
—	Cameroon	Adamou Aboubakar; Mathieu Kouanotso; Roland Inack	DNF

=== Women's ===
Rank	Country	Team	Time
1st place, gold medalist(s)	Kenya	Susan Chepkemei; Isabella Ochichi; Caroline Kwambai	3:28:04
2nd place, silver medalist(s)	Japan	Mizuki Noguchi; Yasuyo Iwamoto; Takako Kotorida	3:30:08
3rd place, bronze medalist(s)	Ethiopia	Berhane Adere; Meseret Kotu; Teyba Erkesso	3:30:20
4	Great Britain	Paula Radcliffe; Liz Yelling; Annie Emmerson	3:31:16
5	Romania	Mihaela Botezan; Nuta Olaru; Aurica Buia	3:31:18
6	Russia	Lyudmila Biktasheva; Viktoriya Klimina; Lyubov Morgunova	3:32:23
7	Hungary	Beáta Rakonczai; Simona Staicu; Erika Csomor	3:38:17
8	United States	Milena Glusac; Sylvia Mosqueda; Susannah Beck	3:40:18
9	South Africa	Elana Meyer; Charné Rademeyer; Poppy Mlambo	3:41:14
10	Brazil	Maria Baldaia; Marizete Rezende; Dione dʼAgostini	3:41:45
11	Tanzania	Restituta Joseph; Tausi Juma; Margareth Iro	3:41:50
12	Italy	Silvia Sommaggio; Gloria Marconi; Patrizia Tisi	3:42:25
13	Belgium	Sandra Van Den Haesevelde; Cathérine Lallemand; Ann Parmentier	3:46:49
14	Belarus	Alla Zadorozhnaya; Natallia Kvachuk; Natalia Bendzik	3:57:45
15	Uzbekistan	Yuliya Arfipova; Irina Matrosova; Yekaterina Dirova	4:19:02

== Participation ==
The participation of 200 athletes (125 men/75 women) from 52 countries is reported. Although announced, athletes from Guinea and Yemen did not show.

- Algeria (5)
- Angola (4)
- Argentina (2)
- Azerbaijan (2)
- Belarus (6)
- Belgium (7)
- Bermuda (1)
- Botswana (3)
- Brazil (9)
- Cameroon (3)
- Central African Republic (1)
- Chile (3)
- Cuba (2)
- Czech Republic (2)
- Denmark (1)
- Ethiopia (8)
- Finland (1)
- France (5)
- Hungary (4)
- Israel (2)
- Italy (9)
- Japan (9)
- Kazakhstan (2)
- Kenya (10)
- Kyrgyzstan (2)
- Latvia (1)
- Lesotho (1)
- Macau (1)
- Maldives (1)
- Mauritius (2)
- Mexico (5)
- Morocco (6)
- Nepal (1)
- Portugal (3)
- Puerto Rico (1)
- Romania (5)
- Russia (5)
- Seychelles (1)
- Slovakia (1)
- South Africa (10)
- Spain (5)
- Swaziland (1)
- Sweden (1)
- Tanzania (7)
- Turkmenistan (4)
- Uganda (3)
- United Kingdom (10)
- United States (10)
- Uzbekistan (6)
- Yugoslavia (1)
- Zambia (4)
- Zimbabwe (1)

== See also ==
- 2001 in athletics (track and field)
