= Irene Kwambai =

Kenyan long-distance runner (born 1978)

Medal record

Women's athletics

Representing Kenya

African Championships
Silver medal – second place	2004 Brazzaville	10,000 m

Irene Kwambai Kipchumba (born 25 October 1978) is a Kenyan long-distance runner.

Her first major medal came at the 2004 African Championships in Athletics where she took silver in the 10,000 metres behind Eyerusalem Kuma. She also won the Cursa de Bombers that year and repeated as the winner in 2005, setting a course record in the process. She ran at the 2005 World Championships in Athletics and was tenth in the women's 10,000 m. Her 2006 season was highlighted by a win at the Vitry-sur-Seine Half Marathon. She won the women's 5K race at the Prague Grand Prix the following year.

Kwambai was selected to represent Kenya in the 10,000 m at the 2007 All-Africa Games and she won the bronze medal. She was the silver medallist in the event at the 2007 World Military Games a few months later, where she was beaten by her national rival Doris Changeywo.

She ran at the Paul Tergat's Baringo Half Marathon in November 2010 and was fourth in the race.

== Achievements ==
Year	Competition	Venue	Position	Notes
2000	World Cross Country Championships	Vilamoura, Portugal	11th	Long race
2004	African Championships	Brazzaville, Congo	2nd	10,000 m
2004	World Athletics Final	Monte Carlo, Monaco	9th	5000 m
2005	World Cross Country Championships	Saint-Etienne, France	11th	Long race
2005	World Championships	Helsinki, Finland	10th	10,000 m
2005	World Athletics Final	Monte Carlo, Monaco	9th	5000 m
2006	World Athletics Final	Stuttgart, Germany	10th	5000 m
2007	All-Africa Games	Algiers, Algeria	3rd	10,000 m

=== Road running ===
- 2006 Vitry-sur-Seine Half Marathon - 1st
- 2007 Vitry-sur-Seine Half Marathon - 2nd
- 2009 Prague Half Marathon - 2nd (time 1:09:27, PB)

=== Personal bests ===
- Mile run - 4:38.02 min (2003)
- 3000 metres - 8:46.38 min (2003)
- 5000 metres - 14:49.32 min (2006)
- 10,000 metres - 30:55.67 min (2005)
- Half marathon - 1:09:27 hrs (2010)
