= Belhout =

Belhout is a surname. Notable people with the surname include:

- Rachid Belhout (1944–2020), Algerian football manager and former player
- Saïd Belhout (born 1975), Algerian long-distance runner
