= Peter Kiplagat Chebet =

Kenyan long-distance runner

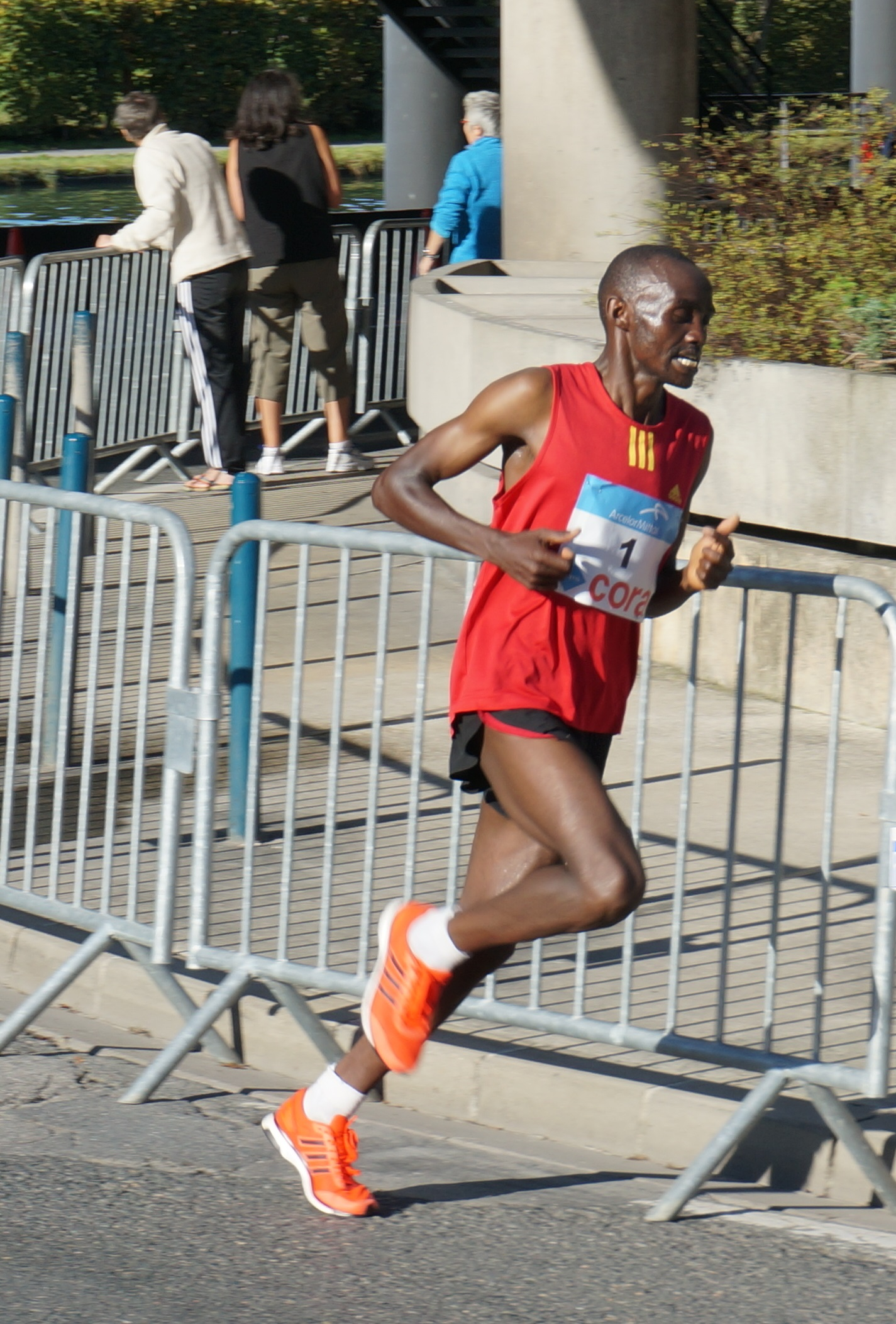
2013 at Rheims.

Peter Kiplagat Chebet (born 9 September 1982) is a Kenyan long-distance runner.

He won the Berkane International Road Race in 2001. At the 2002 Berlin Half Marathon he beat the field to finish in first place and also won the ten mile race at the Diecimiglia del Garda later that year. He was second at the 2005 Berlin Marathon (2:08:58).

He ran at the Košice Peace Marathon in October 2010 – his first competitive marathon since 2006 – and managed to improve his personal best to 2:08:42 and take third place on the podium.

== Achievements ==
Year	Competition	Venue	Position	Event	Notes
Representing Kenya
2001	World Half Marathon Championships	Bristol, England	7th	Half marathon	
2001	World Half Marathon Championships	Bristol, England	2nd	Team	
2013	Reims à Toutes Jambes	Reims, France	1st	Marathon	2:11:36
2014	Reims à Toutes Jambes	Reims, France	2nd	Marathon	2:11:33

=== Personal bests ===
- Half marathon - 1:00:56 hrs (2001)
- Marathon - 2:08:42 hrs (2010)
