= 2004 Berlin Marathon =

Road running event in Berlin, Germany

31st Berlin Marathon
- Venue: Berlin, Germany
- Dates: 26 September 2004

Champions
- Men: Felix Limo (2:06:44)
- Women: Yoko Shibui (2:19:41)

The 2004 Berlin Marathon was the 31st running of the annual marathon race held in Berlin, Germany, held on 26 September 2004. Felix Limo won the men's race in 2:06:44 hours, while the women's race was won by Japan's Yoko Shibui in 2:19:41.

== Results ==
=== Men ===
Position	Athlete	Nationality	Time
1	Felix Limo	Kenya	2:06:44
2	Joseph Muriithi Riri	Kenya	2:06:49
3	Joshua Chelanga	Kenya	2:07:05
4	Wilson Onsare	Kenya	2:08:53
5	Luís Jesus	Portugal	2:09:08
6	Shin-ichi Watanabe	Japan	2:09:32
7	Luís Novo	Portugal	2:09:41
8	Gashaw Asfaw	Ethiopia	2:09:47
9	Isaac Macharia Wanjohi	Kenya	2:11:26
10	Ernest Kipyego	Kenya	2:11:52

=== Women ===
Position	Athlete	Nationality	Time
1	Yoko Shibui	Japan	2:19:41
2	Hiromi Ominami	Japan	2:23:26
3	Sonja Oberem	Germany	2:26:53
4	Beatrice Omwanza	Kenya	2:27:19
5	Leila Aman	Ethiopia	2:27:54
6	Tiziana Alagia	Italy	2:32:20
7	Edyta Lewandowska	Poland	2:34:18
8	Romy Spitzmüller	Germany	2:34:44
9	Manuela Zipse	Germany	2:37:18
10	Anna Rahm	Sweden	2:37:32
