= Mostafa Errebbah =

Italian long-distance runner

Personal information
- Nationality: Italian
- Born: 1 August 1971 (age 54) Douar Krazza, Ksar el-Kebir, Morocco

Sport
- Country: Italy
- Sport: Athletics
- Event: Marathon

Achievements and titles
- Personal best: Marathon: 2:12:22 (2002)

Mostafa Errebbah (born 1 August 1971 in Douar Krazza) is a Moroccan-born Italian long-distance runner who specialized in the 5000 metres.

== Biography ==
He competed at the 2000 World Half Marathon Championships for Morocco. He then became an Italian citizen in January 2001, and finished fifteenth at the 2001 World Half Marathon Championships. He also competed at the 2001 World Half Marathon Championships with less success. He's married with Daniela Melotti since 1998 and they have two children.

=== Doping ban ===
In November 2004 Errebbah tested positive for the anabolic steroid Stanozolol. He was subsequently banned from sport from 31 May 2005 to 30 May 2007.

== Achievements ==
Year	Competition	Venue	Position	Event	Time	Notes
2001	World Half Marathon Championships	(United Kingdom) Bristol	15th	Half marathon	1:02:19	

== Personal bests ==
- 5000 metres - 13:59.4 min (2001)
- 10,000 metres - 28:49.37 min (2001)
- Half marathon - 1:02:19 hrs (2000, 2001)
- Marathon - 2:12:22 hrs (2002)
