= David Ruto =

Kenyan long-distance runner

Medal record

Men's athletics

Representing Kenya

IAAF World Half Marathon Championships
Gold medal – first place	2000 Veracruz	Team

David Kiptarus Ruto (born 1980) is a Kenyan former long-distance runner who competed in road races. He was the team gold medallist at the 2000 IAAF World Half Marathon Championships alongside Paul Tergat and Joseph Kimani, having finished fifth individually.

Ruto competed from 2000 to 2009 and his biggest win was at the 2003 Miami Marathon. He also had runner-up finishes at the Three Hearts Marathon, Brussels Marathon and Mumbai Marathon. He ran the marathon in under two hours and ten minutes on two occasions, including 2:09:21 for third at the 2003 Eindhoven Marathon and 2:08:21 hours at the 2003 Paris Marathon.

== International competitions ==
Year	Competition	Venue	Position	Event	Notes
2000	World Half Marathon Championships	Veracruz, Mexico	5th	Half marathon	1:03:59
2000	World Half Marathon Championships	Veracruz, Mexico	1st	Team	3:11:38
