= Eyerusalem Kuma =

Ethiopian long-distance runner

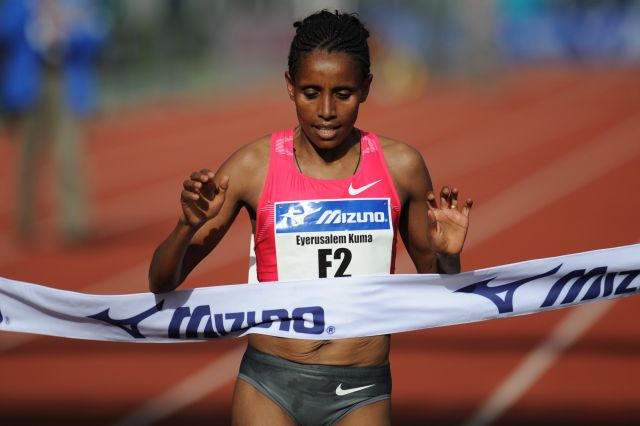
- Eyerusalem Kuma wins the 2009 Amsterdam Marathon

Medal record

Women's athletics

Representing Ethiopia

World Cross Country Championships
Gold medal – first place	2001 Ostend	Team long race
Gold medal – first place	2002 Dublin	Team long race
Gold medal – first place	2003 Lausanne	Team long race

World Half Marathon Championships
Gold medal – first place	2004 New Delhi	Team

African Championships
Gold medal – first place	2004 Brazzaville	10,000 m
Bronze medal – third place	2002 Radès	10,000 m

Eyerusalem Kuma (born 7 September 1981 in Addis Ababa) is an Ethiopian long-distance runner, who competes in marathons. She has a personal best of 2:24:55 hours for the distance and was the 2009 winner of the Amsterdam Marathon.

Early in her career she won team medals with Kenya at the IAAF World Cross Country Championships – her best individual finishes were fifth in 2002 and fourth in 2003. Her first personal international medals came at the African Championships in Athletics, where she was the 10,000 metres bronze medallist in 2002 and the African champion in 2004. She was also fourth in that event at the 2003 All-Africa Games.

She won a team gold medal at the 2004 IAAF World Half Marathon Championships. After a career break she emerged as a marathon specialist in 2009. She was the runner-up at the Amsterdam Marathon in 2010 and 2011.

== Doping ==
In 2013 Kuma failed a doping test that was taken at the Amsterdam Marathon. She was suspended for 2 years.

== Biography ==
At the beginning of her career, she specialized in the track running and cross-country running. Her first international appearances came in 2000, when she was seventh in the junior race at the 2000 IAAF World Cross Country Championships and achieved the same placing over 5000 metres at the 2000 World Junior Championships in Athletics. She made her senior debut the following year at the 2001 IAAF World Cross Country Championships, coming 23rd in the long race and helping Ethiopia to the team silver medal. Kuma made her first impact the year after, as her fifth place in the long race at the 2002 IAAF World Cross Country Championships headed her country to the team title and she claimed the bronze medal over 10,000 metres at the 2002 African Championships in Athletics (behind Kenyan duo Susan Chepkemei and Leah Malot).

At the 2003 IAAF World Cross Country Championships she had her highest placing, coming fourth and taking the team title with medalists Werknesh Kidane and Merima Denboba. She also made it an Ethiopian 1–2 in the 10,000 metres at the 2003 Afro-Asian Games, where she was runner-up to Ejegayehu Dibaba. In spite of a poor showing at the 2004 World Cross Country, she won her first major title at the 2004 African Championships in Athletics, defeating all comers to take the 10,000 m gold medal. Kuma set her 10,000 m personal best that year in Utrecht, Netherlands, running a time of 31:25.46 minutes. This also translated to success on the roads: she came sixth at the 2004 IAAF World Half Marathon Championships and led a team of Bezunesh Bekele and Teyba Erkesso to the gold medal. She ran sparingly in 2005 and had a break in her running career until 2009.

Eyerusalam made a return to competition by making her debut over the marathon distance in 2009 at the Dubai Marathon, where her time of 2:26:51 hours brought her sixth place. On her second outing over the distance, she won the 2009 Amsterdam Marathon. She achieved a half marathon personal best of 1:10.42 hours in the process of a runner-up placing at the Great Scottish Run in Glasgow. She managed only eighth at the Prague Marathon in 2010, but on her return to Amsterdam she was the runner-up in a time of 2:27:04 hours. She ran at the 2011 Paris Marathon and came fourth. In her third straight appearance at the Amsterdam Marathon she ran a personal best of 2:24:55 hours, but was again the runner-up as she finished behind fellow Ethiopian Tiki Gelana.

Eyerusalem didn't make the podium in any of her outings in 2012: she came seventh at the Tokyo Marathon and fifth at both the Toronto Waterfront Marathon and Hannover Marathon. Her first races of 2013 saw her take third at the Xiamen International Marathon and the Vienna City Marathon.

== Personal bests ==
- 3000 metres - 9:04.04 min (2001)
- 5000 metres - 15:05.37 min (2004)
- 10,000 metres - 31:25.46 min (2004)
- Half marathon - 1:10:42 hrs (2009)
- Marathon - 2:24:55 hrs (2011)

== Major competition record ==
Year	Competition	Venue	Position	Event	Notes
Representing Ethiopia
2000	World Junior Championships	Santiago, Chile	7th	5000 m	16:40.07
2001	World Cross Country Championships	Ostend, Belgium	23rd	Long race (7.7 km)	29:58
2001	World Cross Country Championships	Ostend, Belgium	2nd	Team	70 pts
2002	World Cross Country Championships	Dublin, Ireland	5th	Long race (7.974 km)	27:19
2002	World Cross Country Championships	Dublin, Ireland	1st	Team	28 pts
2002	African Championships	Radès, Tunisia	3rd	10,000 m	32:21.60
2003	World Cross Country Championships	Lausanne, Switzerland	4th	Long race (7.92 km)	26:30
2003	World Cross Country Championships	Lausanne, Switzerland	1st	Team	17 pts
2003	World Cross Country Championships	Lausanne, Switzerland	10th	Short race (4.03 km)	12:59
2004	African Championships	Brazzaville, Congo	1st	10,000 m	31:56.77
2004	World Half Marathon Championships	New Delhi, India	6th	Half marathon	1:11:07
2009	Amsterdam Marathon	Amsterdam, Netherlands	1st	Marathon	2:27.42,8
