= Satoshi Irifune =

Japanese long-distance runner

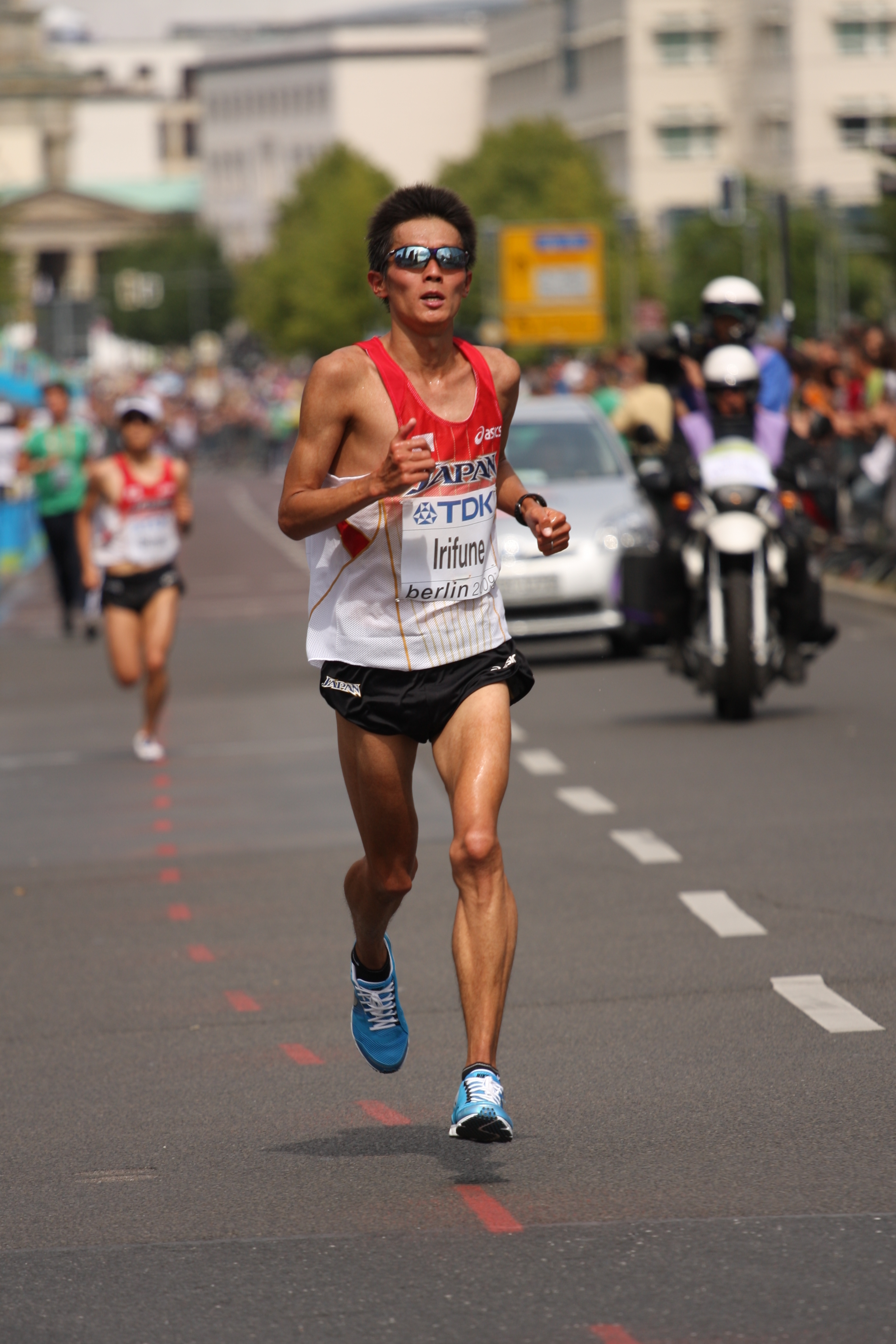
Satoshi Irifune, Berlin 2009

Satoshi Irifune (入船 敏, Irifune Satoshi; born 14 December 1975) is a Japanese long-distance runner who specializes in the marathon.

In the 10,000 metres he finished 20th at the 1999 World Championships. He finished eighteenth at the 2000 World Half Marathon Championships, and in the marathon he finished 20th at the 2005 World Championships, fourth at the 2006 Asian Games and 14th at the 2009 World Championships.

His personal best times are 7:56.80 minutes in the 3000 metres, achieved in June 2003 in Kushiro; 27:53.92 minutes in the 10,000 metres, achieved in May 2001 in Palo Alto; 1:01:36 hours in the half marathon, achieved in April 2005 in Yamaguchi; and 2:09:23 hours in the marathon, achieved in December 2008 in the Fukuoka Marathon.

== Achievements ==
Year	Competition	Venue	Position	Event	Notes
Representing Japan
2000	World Half Marathon Championships	Veracruz, Mexico	18th	Half marathon	
2000	World Half Marathon Championships	Veracruz, Mexico	4th	Team	
2005	Beppu-Ōita Marathon	Beppu-Ōita, Japan	1st	Marathon	2:09:58
