= Humarathon =

French annual half marathon road running event

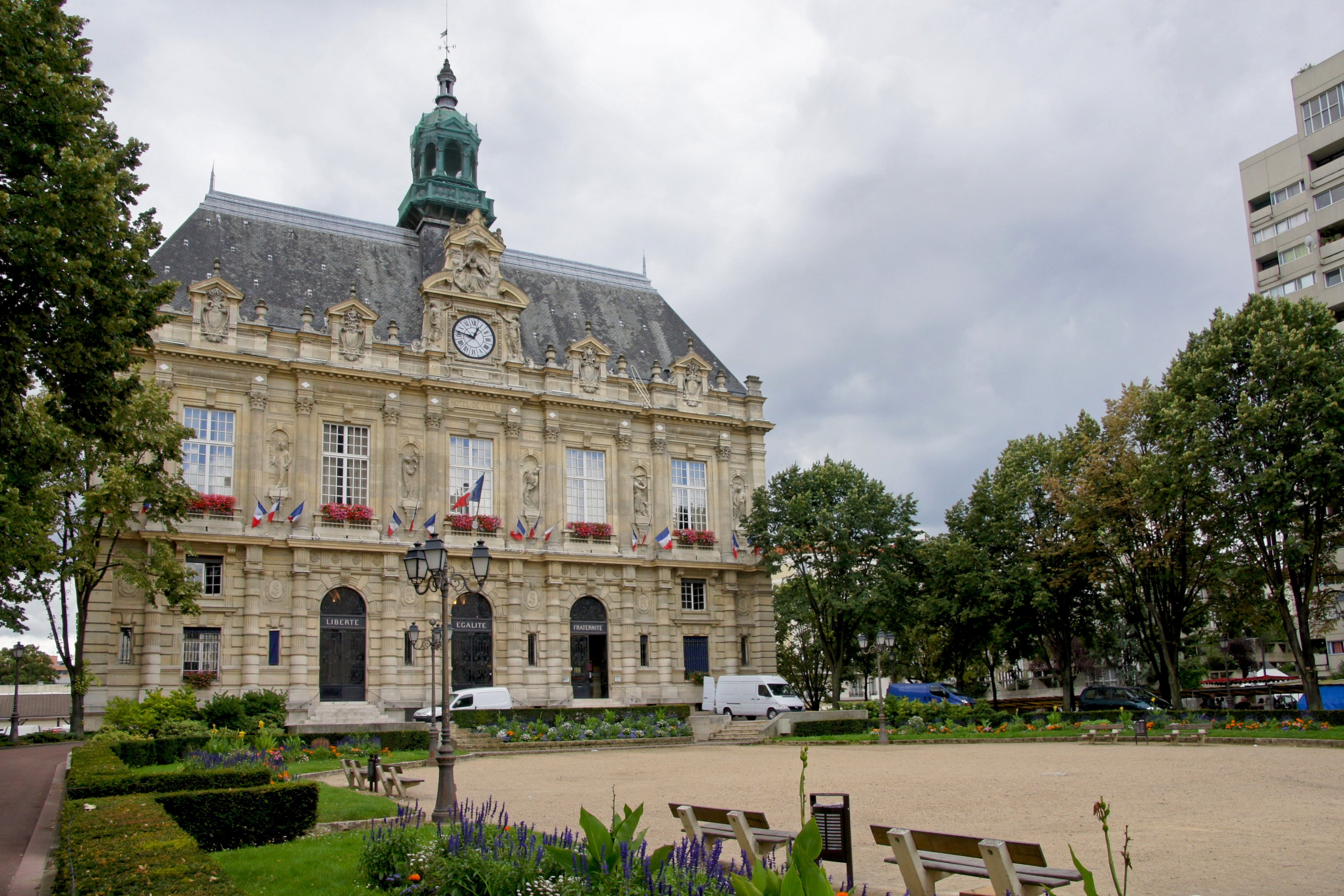
- Ivry Town Hall is the finishing point of the race.
- Date: April
- Location: Ivry- to Vitry-sur-Seine, France
- Event type: Road
- Distance: Half marathon
- Established: 1986

The Humarathon is an annual half marathon road running event which takes place between Ivry-sur-Seine and Vitry-sur-Seine in France every Easter Weekend (usually April). First held in 1986, the race settled on the Ivry- to Vitry-sur-Seine route in the Val-de-Marne department in 1988. The competition also includes a 10K run in its programme of events.

From its first edition, the race attracted international athletes and the winning times throughout its running have been of a high standard. The course records were both set in 2011: Dino Sefir set the men's best of 59:42 minutes and Sarah Chepchirchir improved the women's record to 1:08:07 hours. The Association of Road Racing Statisticians questions the validity of these marks, indicating a short course or wind-assistance, and recognises the best times for the race as Paul Koech's 1996 run of 1:00:31 hours and Mary Keitany's 2007 time of 1:08:36 hours.

The half marathon has a clockwise, circular route which starts near the Parc des Cormailles, heads east to follow the River Seine southwards, goes west through the town of Vitry, turns north on Boulevard de Stalingrad, and then returns east to the Town Hall at Ivry. Around 2000 runners took part in the half marathon event in 2012.

Among the athletes to have competed and won at the race are 1996 Olympic marathon champion Fatuma Roba, the 2002 European Championships marathon winner Maria Guida, 2004 World Half Marathon Champion Paul Kirui, half marathon world record holder Mary Keitany, two-time World Half Marathon runner-up Hendrick Ramaala and three-time World's Best 10k winner Sammy Kitwara.

In 2016 the half-marathon was cancelled to allow the organisers to focus on the charitable aspects of the event.

== Past winners ==
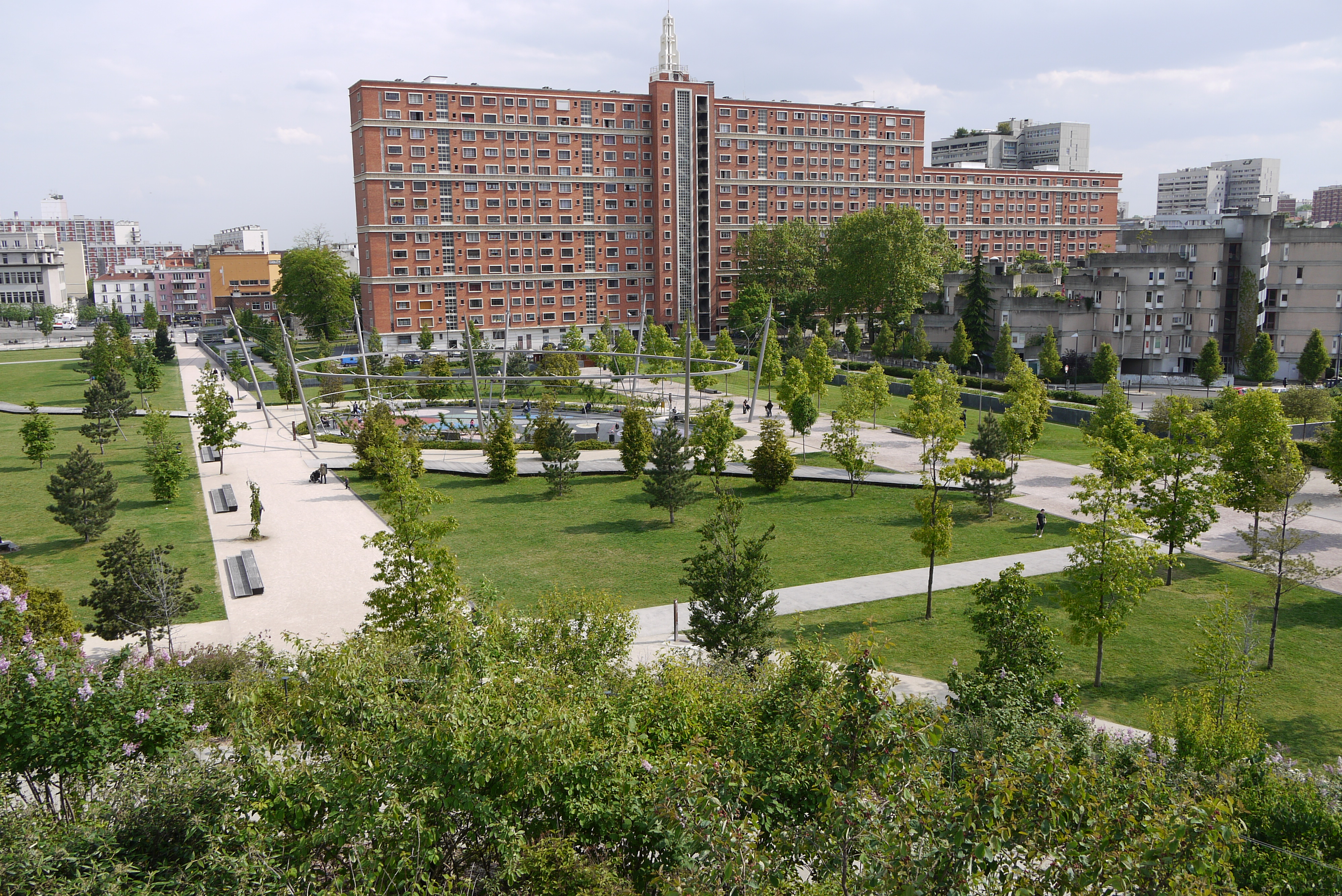
The Parc des Cormailles is near the starting point.

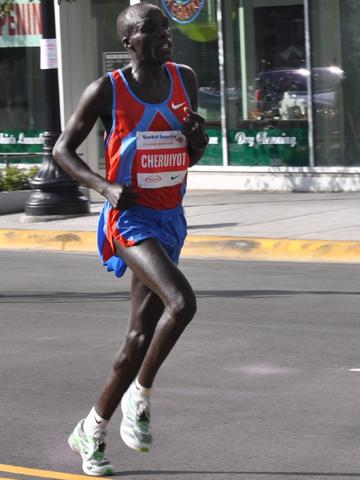
The 2005 men's winner Evans Cheruiyot went on to win the Chicago Marathon.

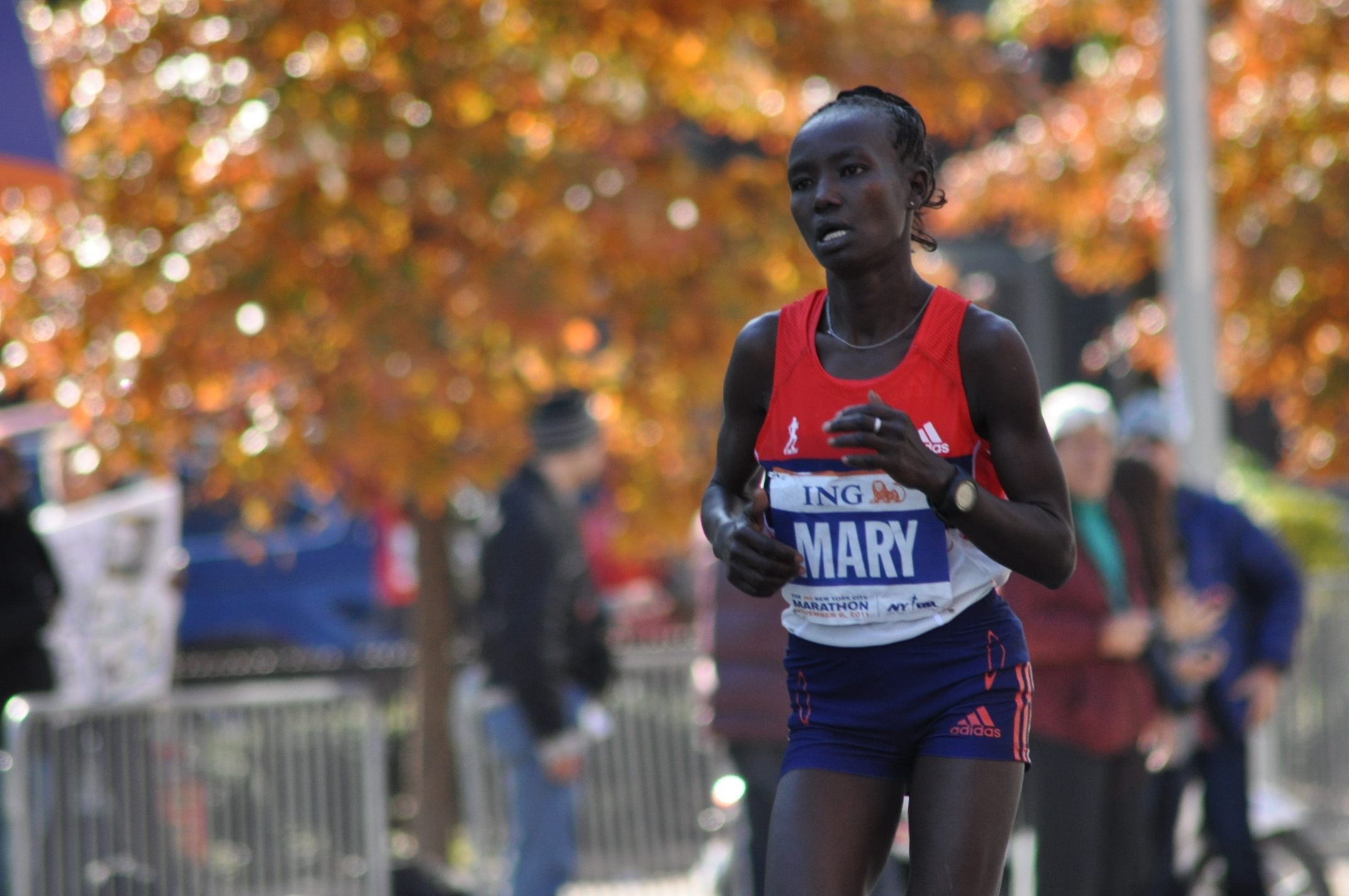
Mary Keitany, the half marathon world record holder, won in 2007.

Key: Course record

Edition	Year	Men's winner	Time (h:m:s)	Women's winner	Time (h:m:s)
1st	1986	Lucio Pereira (POR)	1:04:36	Zoya Gavriluk (UKR)	1:15:43
2nd	1987	El Mostafa Nechchadi (MAR)	?	?	?
3rd	1988	Luis Horta (POR)	1:03:13	Irina Bogachova (KGZ)	1:13:13
4th	1989	Carlos Reis (POR)	1:03:12	Natalya Bardina (RUS)	1:12:17
5th	1990	Abdellah Béhar (FRA); Yakov Tolstikov (URS) (NR)	1:02:24	Irina Bogachova (KGZ)	1:11:48
6th	1991	Sammy Nyangincha (KEN)	1:00:08	Maria Rebelo (FRA)	1:10:08
7th	1992	Sammy Lelei (KEN)	1:01:36	Irina Kazakova (FRA)	1:14:05
8th	1993	Sid-Ali Sakhri (ALG)	1:01:56	Tatyana Pozdnyakova (UKR)	1:13:27
9th	1994	Mauricio González (MEX)	1:02:39	Fatuma Roba (ETH)	1:12:35
10t	1995	Vincent Rousseau (BEL)	1:01:03	Maria Guida (ITA)	1:11:03
11th	1996	Paul Koech (KEN)	1:00:31	Alina Gherasim (ROM)	1:12:45
12th	1997	John Gwako (KEN)	1:01:19	Berhane Adere (ETH)	1:11:02
13th	1998	Simon Bor Kipruto (KEN)	1:01:59	Jackline Jerotich Chebor (KEN)	1:12:54
14th	1999	Hendrick Ramaala (RSA)	1:00:40	Cristina Costea (ROM)	1:10:09
15th	2000	John Nada Saya (TAN)	1:01:19	Irene Kwambai (KEN)	1:11:41
16th	2001	Laban Kipkemboi (KEN)	1:01:16	Maura Viceconte (ITA)	1:09:19
17th	2002	Paul Kirui (KEN)	1:01:53	Margaret Atodonyang (KEN)	1:11:49
18th	2003	John Kyalo (KEN)	1:00:51	Anne Jelagat Kibor (KEN)	1:12:21
19th	2004	Luke Metto (KEN)	1:02:35	Linah Cheruiyot (KEN)	1:10:58
20th	2005	Evans Cheruiyot (KEN)	1:01:01	Jane Ekimat (KEN)	1:10:39
21st	2006	Martin Sulle (TAN)	1:00:58	Irene Kwambai (KEN)	1:09:54
22nd	2007	Enock Mitei (KEN)	1:01:01	Mary Jepkosgei Keitany (KEN)	1:08:36
23rd	2008	Sammy Kitwara (KEN)	1:01:14	Jane Kiptoo (KEN)	1:10:40
24th	2009	Nicholas Kurgat (UGA)	1:00:37	Peninah Arusei (KEN)	1:09:31
25th	2010	Mustafa Ben Nacer (MAR)	1:05:59	Ria Thienpont (FRA)	1:25:19
26th	2011	Dino Sefir (ETH)	59:42	Sarah Chepchirchir (KEN)	1:08:07
27th	2012	Justus Moranga Mogere (KEN)	1:01:07	Cynthia Jerotich (KEN)	1:10:06
28th	2013	Dawit Woldesilasie (ETH)	1:01:07	Gladys Kipsoi Cherchi (KEN)	1:10:08
29th	2014	Charles Ogari (KEN)	1:01:22	Leonidah Mosop (KEN)	1:11:47
30th	2015	Norbert Kigen (KEN)	1:01:02	Bizunesh Getachu Gudeta (KEN)	1:11:41
	2016	Cancelled			
