= 2002 African Championships in Athletics – Women's 10,000 metres =

The women's 10,000 metres event at the 2002 African Championships in Athletics was held in Radès, Tunisia on August 9.

== Results ==
Rank	Name	Nationality	Time	Notes
1st place, gold medalist(s)	Susan Chepkemei	Kenya	31:45.14	
2nd place, silver medalist(s)	Leah Malot	Kenya	32:00.78	
3rd place, bronze medalist(s)	Eyerusalem Kuma	Ethiopia	32:21.60	
4	Asha Gigi	Ethiopia	32:25.74	
5	Souad Aït Salem	Algeria	33:05.76	
6	Soulef Bouguerra	Tunisia	33:18.92	
7	Simret Sultan	Eritrea	34:00.47	
8	Epiphanie Nyirabarame	Rwanda	34:27.51	
9	Dalila Tahi	Algeria	35:39.64	
	Zhor El Kamch	Morocco	DNF	
	Derartu Tulu	Ethiopia	DNS	
