= Lahoussine Mrikik =

Moroccan long-distance runner

Lahoussine Mrikik (born 7 June 1972) is a Moroccan retired long-distance runner who specialized in the marathon.

He was born in Iferiane. He won the 2006 edition of the Vienna Marathon on 7 May 2006, setting his personal best of 2:08:20 hours in the classic distance.

He also finished 25th at the 2001 World Half Marathon Championships. His personal best in the half marathon was 1:01:04 hours, achieved in March 2000 in Paris.

== Marathons ==
Year	Competition	Venue	Position	Notes
Representing Morocco
2006	Vienna Marathon	Vienna, Austria	1st	2:08:20
