= Isabelle Ledroit =

Canadian long-distance runner

Personal information
- Born: 8 December 1966 (age 58)

Sport
- Country: Canada
- Sport: Long-distance running

Isabelle Ledroit (born 8 December 1966) is a Canadian long-distance runner. In 2001, she competed in the women's marathon at the 2001 World Championships in Athletics held in Edmonton, Alberta, Canada. She finished in 38th place.
