= 2004 African Championships in Athletics – Women's 10,000 metres =

The women's 10,000 metres event at the 2004 African Championships in Athletics was held in Brazzaville, Republic of the Congo on July 17.

== Results ==
Rank	Name	Nationality	Time	Notes
1st place, gold medalist(s)	Eyerusalem Kuma	Ethiopia	31:56.77	
2nd place, silver medalist(s)	Irene Kwambai	Kenya	31:57.54	
3rd place, bronze medalist(s)	Catherine Kirui	Kenya	32:35.71	
