= 2001 World Championships in Athletics – Women's marathon =

The Women's Marathon at the 2001 World Championships in Edmonton, Alberta was held on Sunday August 12, 2001.

== Medalists ==
Gold	Lidia Șimon; Romania (ROM)
Silver	Reiko Tosa; Japan (JPN)
Bronze	Svetlana Zakharova; Russia (RUS)

== Abbreviations ==
- All times shown are in hours:minutes:seconds

DNS	did not start
NM	no mark
WR	world record
AR	area record
NR	national record
PB	personal best
SB	season best

== Records ==
Standing records prior to the 2001 World Athletics Championships
World Record	Tegla Loroupe (KEN)	2:20:43	September 26, 1999	Berlin, Germany
Event Record	Rosa Mota (POR)	2:25:17	August 29, 1987	Rome, Italy
Season Best	Yoko Shibui (JPN)	2:23:11	January 28, 2001	Osaka, Japan

== Intermediates ==
Rank	Number	Athlete	Time
5 KILOMETRES
1	640	Constantina Diță (ROM)	17:07
2	352	Kathrin Weßel (GER)	17:59
3	483	Reiko Tosa (JPN)	17:59
4	690	Lyubov Morgunova (RUS)	17:59
5	650	Lidia Șimon (ROM)	17:59
10 KILOMETRES
1	640	Constantina Diță (ROM)	33:54
2	483	Reiko Tosa (JPN)	35:14
3	481	Yoko Shibui (JPN)	35:14
4	343	Sonja Krolik (GER)	35:14
5	58	Marleen Renders (BEL)	35:14
15 KILOMETRES
1	640	Constantina Diță (ROM)	51:11
2	483	Reiko Tosa (JPN)	53:03
3	343	Sonja Krolik (GER)	53:03
4	690	Lyubov Morgunova (RUS)	53:03
5	481	Yoko Shibui (JPN)	53:03
20 KILOMETRES
1	640	Constantina Diță (ROM)	1:08:27
2	483	Elfenesh Alemu (ETH)	1:10:22
3	343	Nuţa Olaru (ROM)	1:10:22
4	650	Lidia Șimon (ROM)	1:10:22
5	690	Lyubov Morgunova (RUS)	1:10:22
HALF MARATHON
1	640	Constantina Diță (ROM)	1:12:17
2	650	Lidia Șimon (ROM)	1:14:08
3	690	Lyubov Morgunova (RUS)	1:14:08
4	343	Nuţa Olaru (ROM)	1:14:08
5	343	Sonja Krolik (GER)	1:14:08
25 KILOMETRES
1	640	Constantina Diță (ROM)	1:25:26
2	343	Sonja Krolik (GER)	1:27:01
3	650	Lidia Șimon (ROM)	1:27:01
4	483	Elfenesh Alemu (ETH)	1:27:01
5	497	Florence Barsosio (KEN)	1:27:01
30 KILOMETRES
1	640	Constantina Diță (ROM)	1:44:28
2	343	Sonja Krolik (GER)	1:45:08
3	483	Elfenesh Alemu (ETH)	1:45:08
4	650	Lidia Șimon (ROM)	1:45:08
5	235	Shitaye Gemechu (ETH)	1:45:09
35 KILOMETRES
1	483	Reiko Tosa (JPN)	2:02:06
2	481	Yoko Shibui (JPN)	2:02:06
3	650	Lidia Șimon (ROM)	2:02:07
4	717	Svetlana Zakharova (RUS)	2:02:07
5	343	Sonja Krolik (GER)	2:02:17
40 KILOMETRES
1	483	Reiko Tosa (JPN)	2:18:43
2	650	Lidia Șimon (ROM)	2:18:49
3	481	Yoko Shibui (JPN)	2:19:02
4	717	Svetlana Zakharova (RUS)	2:19:02
5	343	Sonja Krolik (GER)	2:20:09

== Final ranking ==
Rank	Athlete	Time	Note
1st place, gold medalist(s)	Lidia Șimon (ROM)	2:26:01	
2nd place, silver medalist(s)	Reiko Tosa (JPN)	2:26:06	
3rd place, bronze medalist(s)	Svetlana Zakharova (RUS)	2:26:18	
4	Yoko Shibui (JPN)	2:26:33	
5	Sonja Krolik (GER)	2:28:17	
6	Florence Barsosio (KEN)	2:28:36	
7	Shitaye Gemechu (ETH)	2:28:40	PB
8	Lyubov Morgunova (RUS)	2:28:54	
9	Kazumi Matsuo (JPN)	2:29:57	
10	Constantina Diță (ROM)	2:30:38	PB
11	Irina Timofeyeva (RUS)	2:30:48	
12	Firiya Sultanova-Zhdanova (RUS)	2:30:58	SB
13	Fatuma Roba (ETH)	2:31:10	
14	Ornella Ferrara (ITA)	2:32:45	
15	Nuţa Olaru (ROM)	2:33:05	
16	Yun Sun-Sook (KOR)	2:33:09	
17	Bruna Genovese (ITA)	2:33:13	
18	Marleen Renders (BEL)	2:33:25	
19	Meseret Kotu (ETH)	2:33:43	PB
20	Rosaria Console (ITA)	2:34:11	
21	Tiziana Alagia (ITA)	2:34:45	
22	Rie Matsuoka (JPN)	2:34:45	
23	Melanie Kraus (GER)	2:34:51	
24	Marie Söderström-Lundberg (SWE)	2:35:00	
25	Maria Abel (ESP)	2:35:09	
26	Sara Ferrari (ITA)	2:36:07	
27	María Luisa Larraga (ESP)	2:36:20	
28	Marta Fernández (ESP)	2:37:09	
29	Griselda González (ESP)	2:37:52	
30	Alina Gherasim (ROM)	2:38:19	
31	Tadelesh Birra (ETH)	2:39:10	
32	Jill Gaitenby (USA)	2:39:20	
33	Tina Connelly (CAN)	2:40:16	
34	Sandy Jacobson (CAN)	2:40:24	
35	Eva Sanz (ESP)	2:41:16	
36	Elizabeth Mongudhi (NAM)	2:42:23	
37	Takami Ominami (JPN)	2:42:25	
38	Isabelle Ledroit (CAN)	2:43:30	
39	Teresa Duffy (IRL)	2:43:33	
40	Susan Michelsson (AUS)	2:46:14	
41	Michelle Simonaitis (USA)	2:46:20	SB
42	Rosa Gutierrez (GUA)	2:49:08	
43	Danuta Bartoszek (CAN)	2:50:06	
44	Tania Jones (CAN)	2:50:46	
45	Rachel Cook (USA)	2:53:21	
46	Gulsara Dadabayeva (TJK)	2:54:12	
47	Alexa Babakhanian (ARM)	2:56:57	
48	Magda Castillo (HON)	2:57:17	NR
49	Margarita Conde (GUA)	3:03:03	PB
50	Angelina Cornelio (GUA)	3:12:21	
51	Herlinda Xol (GUA)	3:14:29	
52	Lindiwe Maziya (SWZ)	3:23:19	
DID NOT FINISH (DNF)
—	Elfenesh Alemu (ETH)	DNF	
—	Cristiana Pomacu (ROM)	DNF	
—	Jennifer Tonkin (USA)	DNF	
—	Kathrin Ullrich (GER)	DNF	
—	Zahia Dahmani (FRA)	DNF	
—	Irina Matrosova (UZB)	DNF	

== See also ==
- Women's Olympic Marathon (2000)
- 2001 Marathon Year Ranking
- 2001 World Marathon Cup
