= Benedict Ako =

Tanzanian long-distance runner (born 1968)

Benedict Ako (born 5 August 1968) is a Tanzanian retired long-distance runner. Ako is a three-time champion of the Mount Meru Marathon in Arusha (1993, 1994, 2002). He holds an "all-comers" record for the fastest marathon performance in Tanzania, 2:13:46, set 1 August 1993 in Arusha.

== Achievements ==
Year	Tournament	Venue	Result	Event
1997	World Cross Country Championships	Turin, Italy	25th	Long race
1998	World Cross Country Championships	Marrakesh, Morocco	26th	Long race
1998	World Cross Country Championships	Marrakesh, Morocco	6th	Team competition
2001	World Half Marathon Championships	Bristol, United Kingdom	22nd	Half marathon
2001	World Half Marathon Championships	Bristol, United Kingdom	3rd	Team competition

=== Personal bests ===
- Half marathon – 1:02:33 hrs (2001)
- Marathon – 2:13:53 hrs (2001)
