= Phaustin Baha Sulle =

Tanzanian long-distance runner

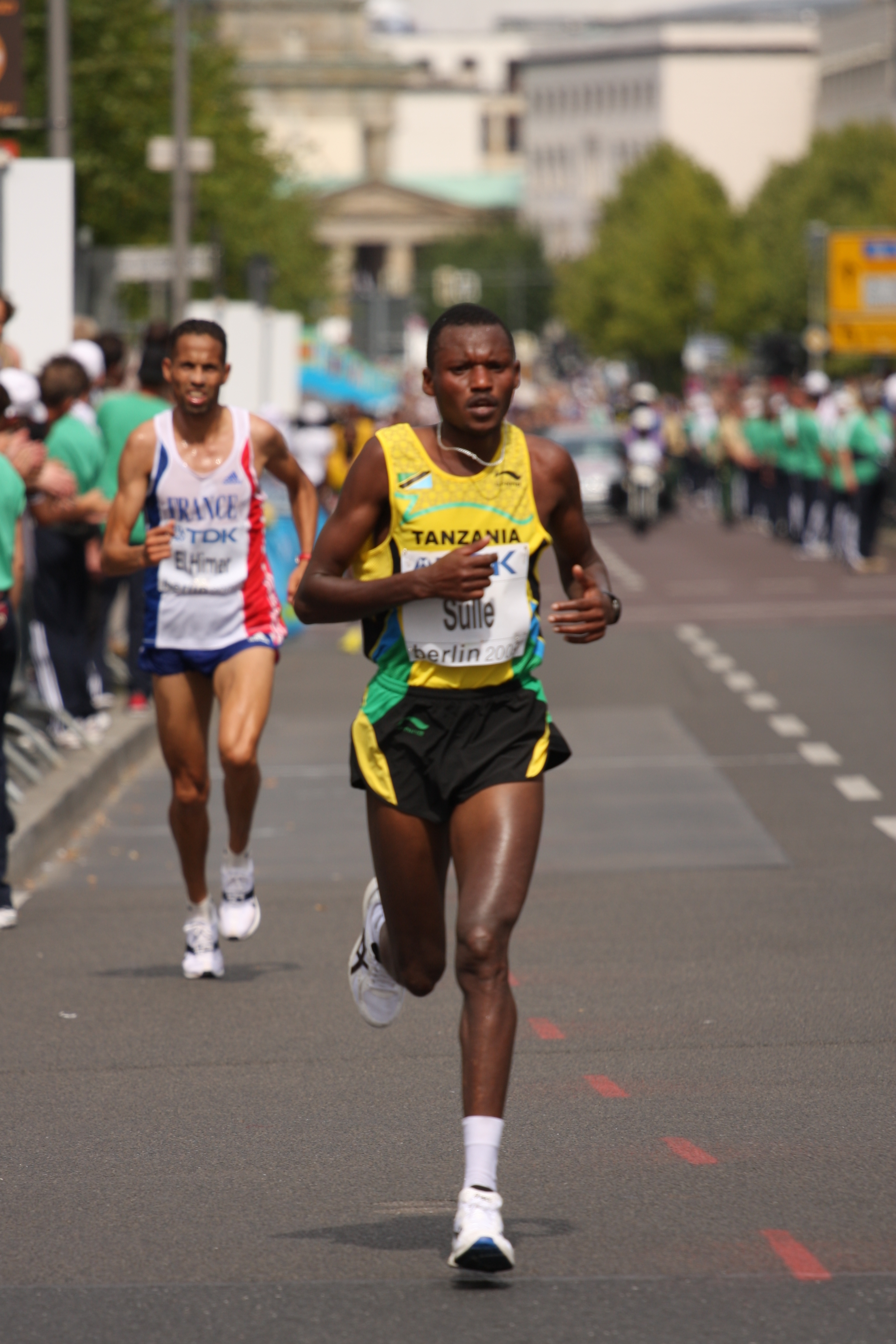
Phaustin Baha Sulle, Berlin 2009

Phaustin Baha Sulle (born 30 May 1982 in Arusha) is a Tanzanian long-distance runner who specializes in the half marathon and marathon. He won the silver medal at the 2000 World Half Marathon Championships. In 1999 he won the Paris Half Marathon and set a course record at the Marseille-Cassis Classique Internationale.

== Achievements ==
Year	Competition	Venue	Position	Event	Notes
Representing Tanzania
1999	Paris Half Marathon	Paris, France	1st	Half marathon	1:01:37
1999	Lille Half Marathon	Lille, France	1st	Half marathon	1:00:38
1999	Corrida de Langueux	Langueux, France	1st	10 km	
1999	World Half Marathon Championships	Palermo, Italy	15th	Half marathon	
1999	Marseille-Cassis Classique Internationale	Marseille, France	1st	Half marathon	1:00:24
2000	World Half Marathon Championships	Veracruz, Mexico	2nd	Half marathon	
2001	World Half Marathon Championships	Bristol, England	12th	Half marathon	
2001	World Half Marathon Championships	Bristol, England	3rd	Team	

=== Personal bests ===
- Half marathon - 1:00:05 (2000)
- Marathon - 2:10:08 (2004)
