= Alexa Babakhanian =

Armenian long-distance runner

Personal information
- Born: 16 September 1966 (age 59)

Sport
- Country: Armenia
- Sport: Long-distance running

Alexa Babakhanian (born 16 September 1966) is an Armenian long-distance runner. In 2001, she competed in the women's marathon at the 2001 World Championships in Athletics held in Edmonton, Alberta, Canada. She finished in 47th place.
