= Yoko Shibui =

Japanese long-distance runner

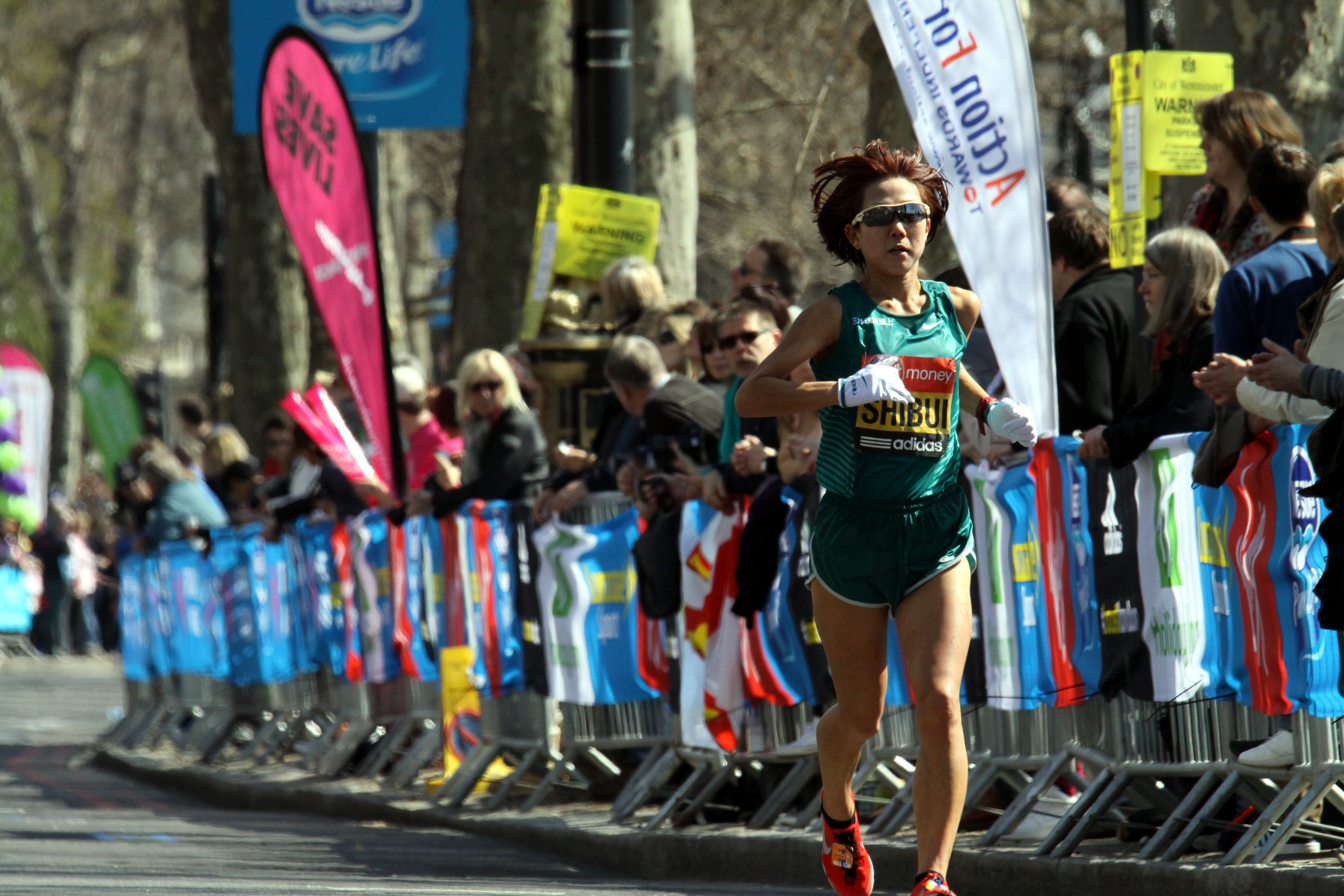
Yoko Shibui during 2013 London Marathon

Yoko Shibui (渋井 陽子, Shibui Yōko; born March 14, 1979 in Kuroiso, now Nasushiobara, Tochigi) is a long-distance runner from Japan, who is competing in the 5000 and 10,000 metres as well as the marathon race. She holds the Japanese record over 10,000 m with her best time of 30:48.89 minutes. Shibui is one of only a handful of women to have completed the marathon under two hours and twenty minutes – her personal best of 2:19.41 ranks her within the top ten fastest ever.

She made a winning debut in the marathon in 2001, when she triumphed at the Osaka Ladies Marathon in 2:23:11 hours. She finished fourth at the 2001 World Championships in Edmonton. At the next global championships, the 2003 World Championships in Paris, she finished fourteenth in the 10,000 metres. One year later Shibui won the Berlin Marathon, clocking a personal best of 2:19:41.

In 2008, she finished seventeenth in the 10,000 metres at the Olympic Games. Shibui won both the Osaka Ladies Marathon and the San Francisco Marathon in 2009. At the 2011 Tokyo Marathon she was in a leading position with only two kilometres to go but slowed to relinquish her lead, ending up in fourth place. She tried to gain a place on the 2012 Olympic marathon team, but her fourth-place finish at the 2012 Nagoya Women's Marathon was not enough for selection.

== Competition record ==
| Year | Competition | Venue | Position | Event | Notes |
Representing Japan
| 2001 | Osaka Ladies Marathon | Osaka, Japan | 1st | Marathon | 2:23:11 |
| 2001 | World Championships | Edmonton, Canada | 4th | Marathon | 2:26:33 |
| 2002 | Chicago Marathon | Chicago, United States | 3rd | Marathon | 2:21:22 |
| 2003 | World Championships | Paris, France | 14th | 10,000 m | |
| 2004 | Berlin Marathon | Berlin, Germany | 1st | Marathon | 2:19:41 |
| 2008 | Olympic Games | Beijing, China | 17th | 10,000 m | |
| 2009 | Osaka Ladies Marathon | Osaka, Japan | 1st | Marathon | 2:23:42 |
| 2009 | San Francisco Marathon | San Francisco, United States | 1st | Marathon | 2:46:34 |
