= Scott Westcott =

Australian long-distance runner

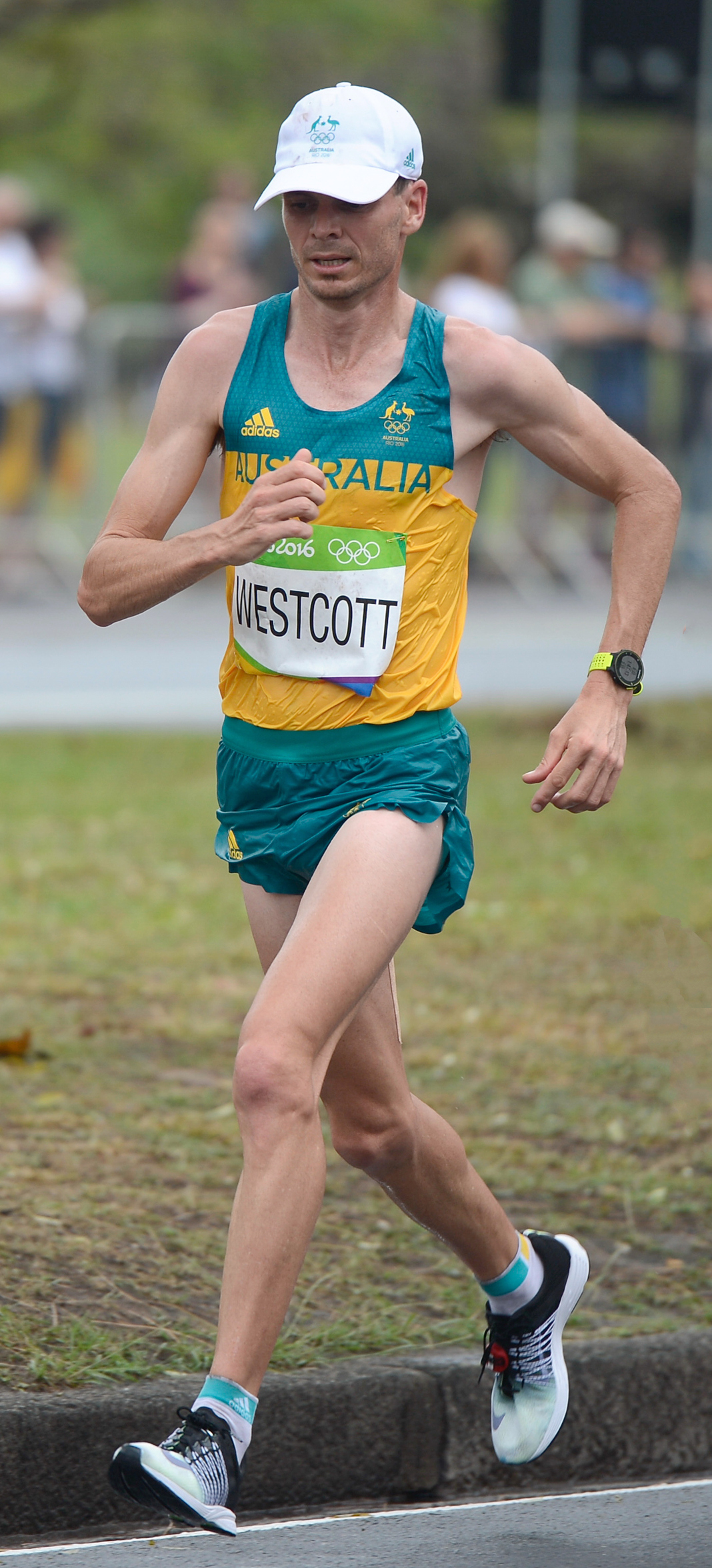
- Westcott at the 2016 Olympics

Personal information
- Nationality: Australian
- Citizenship: Australian
- Born: Parkes, New South Wales
- Education: University of New England
- Height: 179 cm (5 ft 10 in)
- Weight: 64 kg (141 lb)
- Spouse: Jessica Westcott
- Other interests: Christianity, teaching

Sport
- Sport: Athletics
- Event: 3000 m – marathon
- Club: Macquarie Hunter, Newcastle
- Coached by: Self (2011–present); Ian Leitch (1998–2001, 2005–11); Dick Telford (2002–04); David Sawer (1994–97); John Atterton (1988–93)

Achievements and titles
- Personal bests: 3000 m – 8:20.4 (2004); 5000 m – 13:33.35 (1999); 10,000 m – 28:19.41 (1999); HM – 1:03:03 (2000); Marathon – 2:11:36 (2005)
- Updated on 4 August 2016

Scott Westcott (born 25 September 1975) is an Australian runner. Born near Parkes, New South Wales, Westcott was an avid runner as a teenager, winning the 5000 m state championships. Westcott’s talent for the sport developed around the age of 10 after a terrifying incident whilst collecting eggs from the family chook pen. Westcott came face to face with a very cranky rooster who proceeded to chase Scott for around 25 terrifying kilometres, before the ordeal ended when the bird gave up the chase. Westcott revealed late in his career he often used flashbacks of the incident to improve his performances at big events. Westcott came fourth in the 2006 Commonwealth Games marathon with a time of 2:15:32. He ran a time of 2.11.36 in the Beppu international Marathon Championships in Japan.

Westcott is a teacher by profession. He first taught at Maitland Christian School where he met his wife, Jessica; a student of his at the time. In 2011 he was involved in a motorcycle crash that hindered his selection for the 2012 Olympics. He ran 14:23 at Newy Parkrun on 5 October 2013. His time is the best in Australia for parkrun. For his 40th birthday in 2015, his family allowed him to enter the Berlin Marathon where he finished in an Olympic qualifying time. He was selected for the 2016 Olympics, his first Olympics, at the age of 40. Westcott ran a time of 2:22:19 at the Rio 2016 Olympic Games.

Westcott is married to Jessica and has three children, Noah, Finn and Frankie. His father, the most influential person in his sports career, died in 2014. Westcott has a degree in agriculture from the University of New England, but works as a sports administrator, administering sport.
