= Reiko Tosa =

Japanese long-distance runner

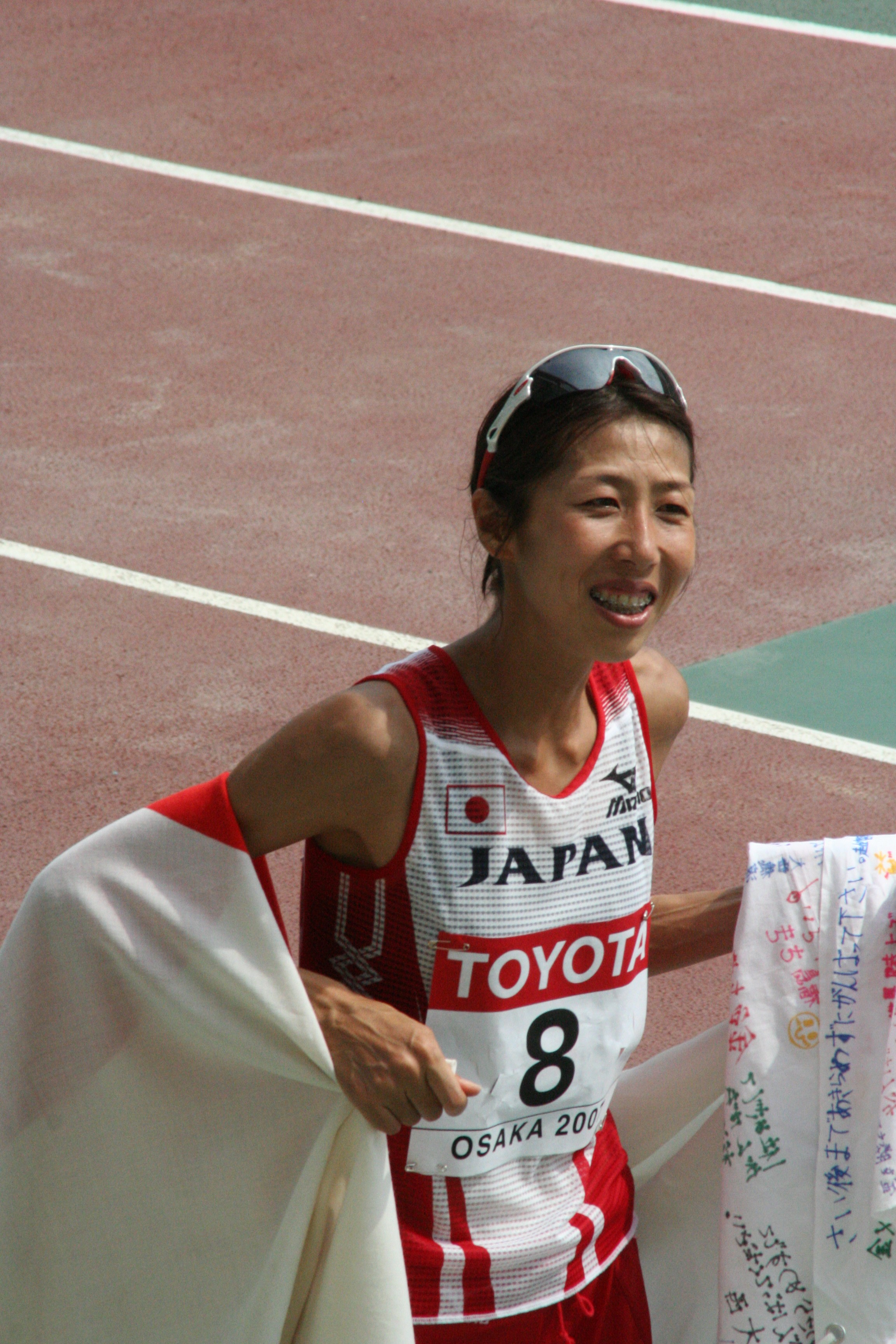
- Reiko Tosa at the 2007 World Championships in Athletics

Medal record

Representing Japan

Women's athletics

World Championships
Silver medal – second place	2001 Edmonton	Marathon
Bronze medal – third place	2007 Osaka	Marathon

Reiko Tosa (土佐 礼子, Tosa Reiko; born 11 June 1976) is a Japanese long-distance runner who specializes in the marathon race. She was born in Matsuyama, Ehime.

== Achievements ==
- All results regarding marathon, unless stated otherwise

Year	Competition	Venue	Position	Notes
Representing Japan
1999	World Half Marathon Championships	Palermo, Italy	5th	Half marathon
2000	Nagoya Marathon	Nagoya, Japan	2nd	2:24:36
2000	Tokyo Marathon	Tokyo, Japan	2nd	2:24:47
2001	World Championships	Edmonton, Canada	2nd	2:26:06
2002	London Marathon	London, United Kingdom	4th	2:22:46
2004	Olympic Games	Athens, Greece	5th	2:28:44
2004	Nagoya Marathon	Nagoya, Japan	1st	2:23:57
2006	Boston Marathon	Boston, United States	3rd	2:24:11
2006	Tokyo Marathon	Tokyo, Japan	1st	2:26:15
2007	World Championships	Osaka, Japan	3rd	2:30:55
2008	Olympic Games	Beijing, PR China	—	DNF
2009	Tokyo Marathon	Tokyo, Japan	3rd	2:29:19

== Personal bests ==
- 5000 metres - 15:37.08 min (2000)
- 10,000 metres - 32:07.66 min (2005)
- Half marathon - 1:09:36 hrs (1999)
- Marathon - 2:22:46 hrs (2002)
