= Lyubov Morgunova =

Russian long-distance runner

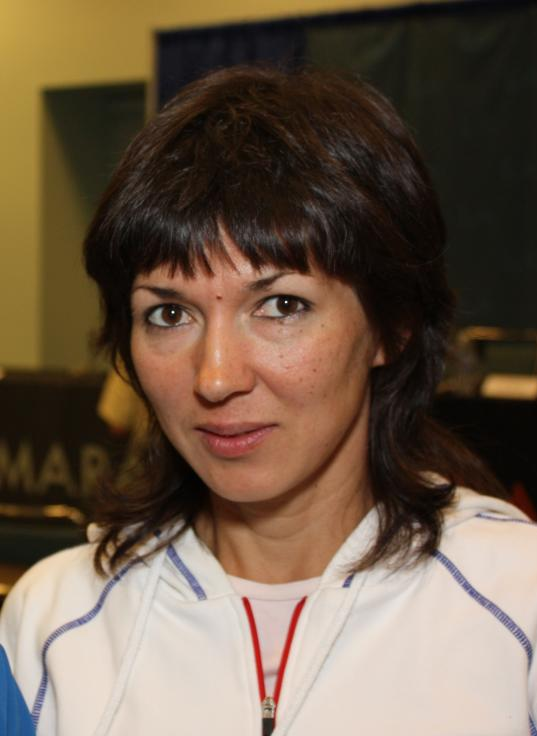

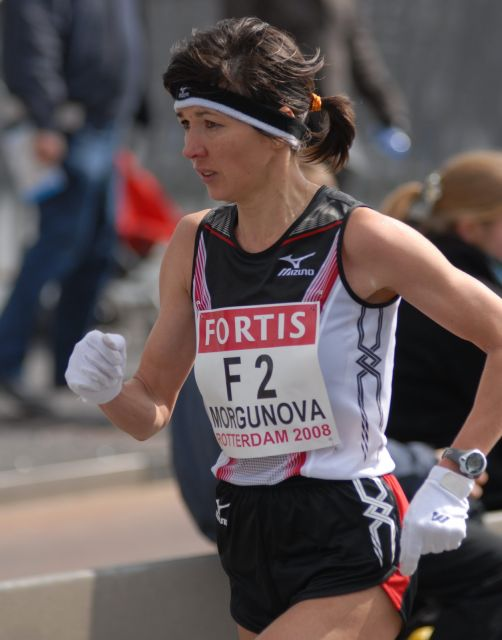

Lyubov Vasilyevna Morgunova (Russian: Любовь Васильевна Моргунова; born 14 January 1971 in Tatarstan) is a long-distance runner from Russia. She represented her native country at the 2000 Summer Olympics, finishing in 23rd place. Morgunova set her personal best in the same year, clocking 2:26:33.

== International competitions ==
Representing Russia
Year	Competition	Venue	Position	Event	Result	Notes
1998	European Championships	Budapest, Hungary	7th	Marathon	2:30:07	
2000	Olympic Games	Sydney, Australia	23rd	Marathon	2:32:35	
2001	World Championships	Edmonton, Canada	8th	Marathon	2:28:54	
2009	World Championships	Berlin, Germany	32nd	Marathon	2:38:23	

== Professional marathons ==
Year	Competition	Venue	Position	Result	Notes
1997	Twin Cities Marathon	Minneapolis, United States	1st	2:30:43	
1999	Nagoya Marathon	Nagoya, Japan	1st	2:27:43	
2000	Honolulu Marathon	Honolulu, Hawaii	1st	2:28:33	
2001	2001 Boston Marathon	Boston, United States	3rd	2:27:18	
2001	Honolulu Marathon	Honolulu, Hawaii	1st	2:29:54	
2003	Toronto Waterfront Marathon	Toronto, Canada	1st	2:36:19	
2008	Rotterdam Marathon	Rotterdam, Netherlands	1st	2:25:10	
