= Liliana Merlo =

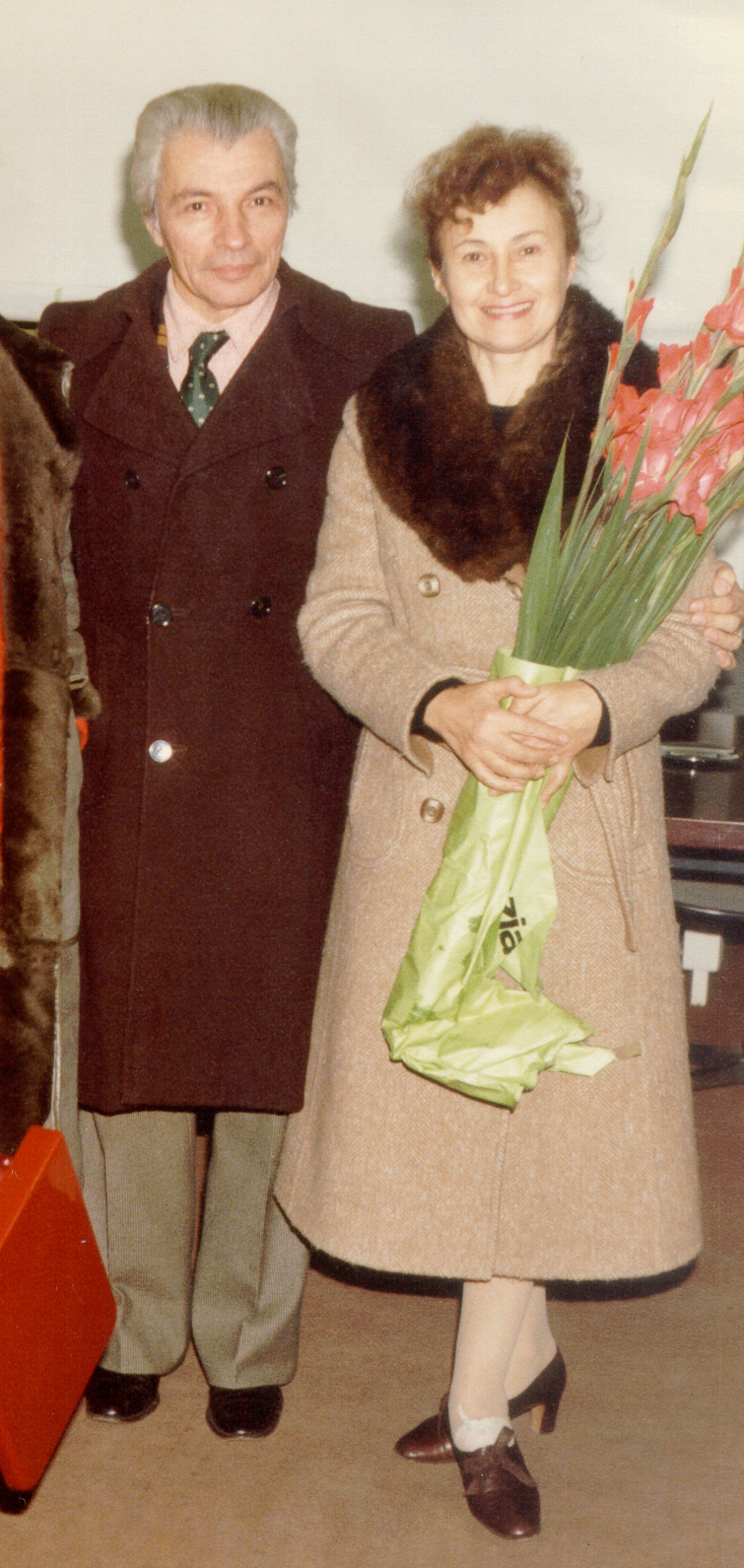

Liliana Maria Antonieta Dolores Merlo (September 16, 1925 - October 17, 2002) was an Argentine dancer, choreographer, dance teacher and cultural promoter.

Merlo was born in Buenos Aires, Argentina, and became a pioneer of classical ballet in Abruzzo. She died in Teramo, Italy, aged 77.

== Principle choreographic works ==
- 1951 - Pedro y el Lobo
- 1956 - Sinfonia perpetua
- 1962 - Le Coefore
- 1962 - Egloga abruzzese
- 1963 - Biancaneve e i sette nani
- 1970 - Quadri di una esposizione
- 1973 - La Contestazione
- 1973 - Magnificat – Otto momenti della storia dell’uomo
- 1975 - Una notte sul Monte Calvo
- 1976 - Scherzo in Quattro Tempi
- 1976 - Zingaresca
- 1977 - Capitan Spaventa
- 1977 - Fantasia in Tre movimenti
- 1977 - Sinfonia coreografica
- 1978 - Classico o Moderno?
- 1978 - Toccata
- 1978 - Le Troiane
- 1979 - Capriccio spagnolo
- 1979 - Morte di un pianeta
- 1979 - Quadri di una esposizione
- 1980 - Construction in metal
- 1980 - Scherzo all’italiana
- 1981 - Danza moresca
- 1981 - Grandi Variazioni
- 1982 - Concerto per pianoforte e orchestra n.5
- 1982 - In the Sky
- 1982 - Watch Time
- 1983 - Preludio Op.23 n.5
- 1985 - Concerto per 4 pianoforti
- 1986 - Tangata del Alba
- 1987 - Danze ungheresi
- 1989 - Sinfonia classica
- 1990 - Music of Changes
- 1991 - Divertimento n.1 in Re magg
- 1993 - Concerto per violino
- 1994 - Watermark – Cursum perficio
- 1997 - Allegretto scherzando
- 1998 - Cenerentola
- 1999 - Coppelia
- 2000 - Ombre e Presenze
- 2001 - Canto alla Luna
- 2002 - La bella addormentata nel bosco
