= Herlinda Xol =

Guatemalan long-distance runner

Personal information
- Born: 8 August 1971 (age 54)

Sport
- Country: Guatemala
- Sport: Long-distance running

Herlinda Xol (born 8 August 1971) is a Guatemalan long-distance runner. In 2001, she competed in the women's marathon at the 2001 World Championships in Athletics held in Edmonton, Alberta, Canada. She finished in 51st place.
