= Angelina Cornelio =

Guatemalan long-distance runner

Personal information
- Born: 7 December 1966 (age 58)

Sport
- Country: Guatemala
- Sport: Long-distance running

Angelina Cornelio (born 7 December 1966) is a Guatemalan long-distance runner. In 2001, she competed in the women's marathon at the 2001 World Championships in Athletics held in Edmonton, Alberta, Canada. She finished in 50th place.
