= Susan Chepkemei =

Kenyan long-distance runner

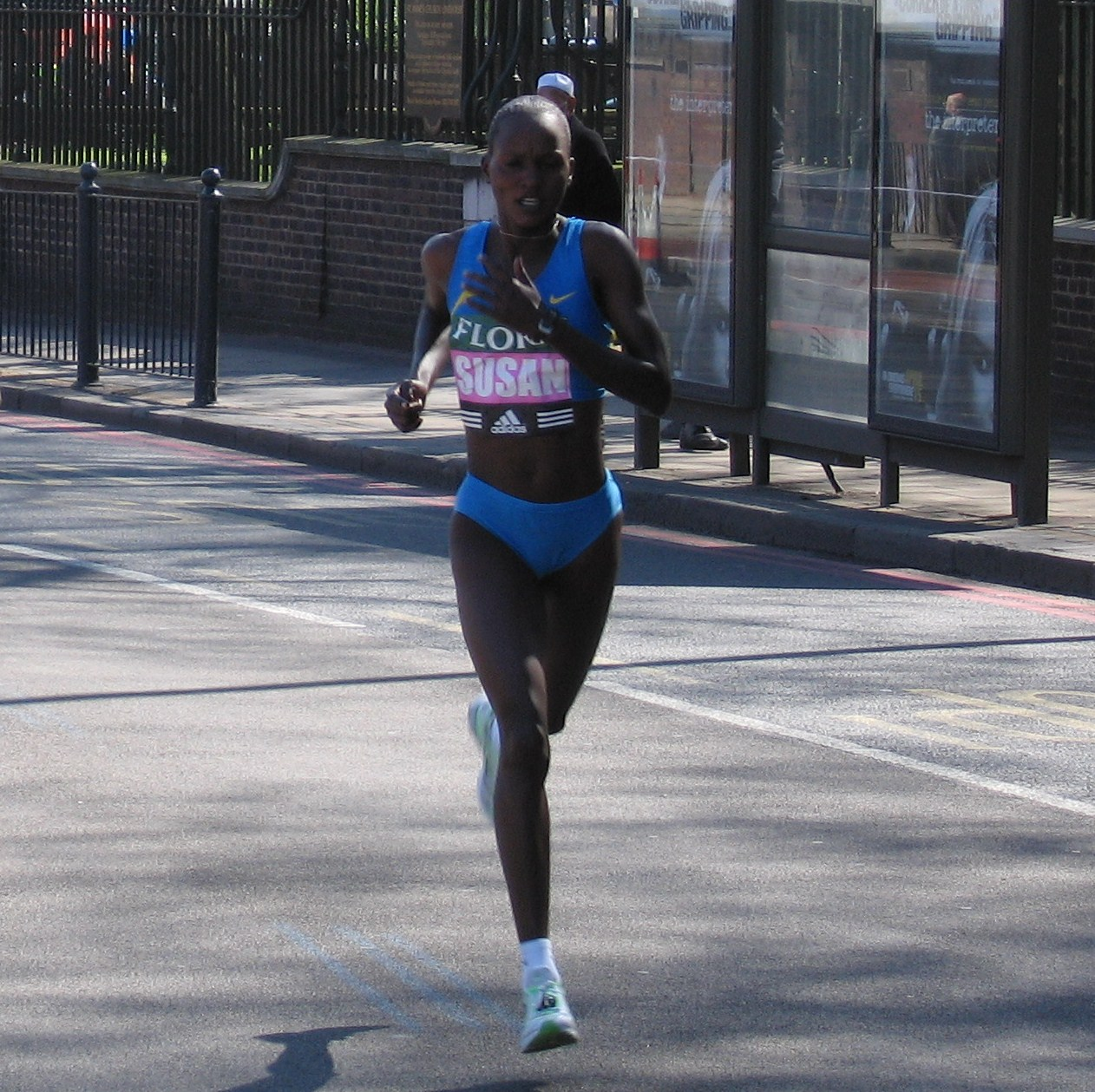
- Chepkemei at the 2005 London Marathon

Medal record

Women's athletics

Representing Kenya

African Championships
Gold medal – first place	2002 Radès	10,000 m

Susan Chepkemei (born 25 June 1975 in Komol, West Pokot District) is a Kenyan long-distance runner, who competes in the 10,000 metres and marathon. In 2001, she won the Rotterdam Marathon and came first in the Great North Run, as well as winning the silver medal in the World Half Marathon Championships. She won also won the silver medal at the 2002 Commonwealth Games in the 10,000 m.

== Career ==
Chepkemei competed at the junior race of IAAF World Cross Country Championships in 1990 and 1992, finishing 3rd and 16th, respectively. at the adult level, she attended the long race between 1998 and 2001, the best result being bronze medal in 2000. She made her marathon debut at the 1998 Berlin Marathon and finished second. She won the Parelloop 10K in race in the Netherlands in 1998 and 2000, and also won the Marseille-Cassis Classique Internationale with a course record time in 2000. She won the Tilburg Ten Miles race (10 km for women) three times a row (2001–2003)

On February 25, 2008, the IAAF imposed a competition ban of 1 year on Chepkemei, making the following statement:

"The International Association of Athletics Federations (IAAF) has been informed by Athletics Kenya (AK) that the female athlete, Susan Chepkemei has been found guilty of the following doping violation under IAAF Rules: Presence of the prohibited substance Salbutamol (S3. Beta-2 Agonists) in her doping control sample (IAAF Rule 32.2a). This doping violation relates to an IAAF out-of-competition doping control conducted on 10.09.07 in Nairobi, KEN."

Chepkemei was given the asthma medication Salbutamol by her doctor after she became pregnant and developed pneumonia; as a result, the ban was reduced to one year. She began her comeback in early 2009.

She is managed by Jos Hermens.

== Marathon achievements ==
Year	Competition	Venue	Position	Notes
September 20, 1998	Berlin Marathon	Berlin, Germany	2nd	2:28:19
April 18, 1999	Rotterdam Marathon	Rotterdam, Netherlands	2nd	2:26:38
November 12, 2000	IAAF World Half Marathon Championships	Veracruz, Mexico	2nd	1:09:40
April 22, 2001	Rotterdam Marathon	Rotterdam, Netherlands	1st	2:25:45
October 7, 2001	IAAF World Half Marathon Championships	Bristol, United Kingdom	2nd	1:07:36
November 4, 2001	New York City Marathon	New York City, United States	2nd	2:25:12
April 14, 2002	London Marathon	London, United Kingdom	5th	2:23:19
May 5, 2002	IAAF World Half Marathon Championships	Brussels, Belgium	2nd	1:09:13
April 13, 2003	London Marathon	London, United Kingdom	4th	2:23:12
November 2, 2003	New York City Marathon	New York City, United States	7th	2:29:05
November 7, 2004	New York City Marathon	New York City, United States	2nd	2:23:13
April 17, 2005	London Marathon	London, United Kingdom	3rd	2:24:00
October 1, 2005	IAAF World Half Marathon Championships	Edmonton, Canada	3rd	1:10:20
November 6, 2005	New York City Marathon	New York City, United States	2nd	2:24:55
April 23, 2006	London Marathon	London, United Kingdom	3rd	2:21:46
November 5, 2006	New York City Marathon	New York City, United States	10th	2:32:45
