= Saïd Belhout =

Algerian long-distance runner

Saïd Belhout (born 16 April 1975) is an Algerian former long-distance runner who competed in the 2004 Summer Olympics. He was born in Tiaret.
