= Dibaba family =

Ethiopian family of elite long-distance runners

The Dibaba family is an Ethiopian family of long-distance runners from Bekoji, in the Oromia Region, of Ethiopia, a high-altitude town that has produced many athletes. Members of the family include sisters Ejegayehu Dibaba, Tirunesh Dibaba, Genzebe Dibaba, and Anna Dibaba, as well as their cousin, Derartu Tulu. Collectively, they have won multiple Olympic and World Championship medals in middle- and long-distance events.

Media outlets have referred to the Dibaba sisters as the "fastest family on Earth". They are the only known trio of siblings in which each member has won an Olympic medal.

== Family members and achievements ==
=== Derartu Tulu ===
Derartu Tulu (born 21 March 1972) is a cousin of the Dibaba sisters. She became the first Black African woman to win Olympic gold, claiming victory in the 10,000 metres at the 1992 Summer Olympics. She later won another gold medal in 2000 and a bronze medal in 2004.

=== Ejegayehu Dibaba ===
Ejegayehu Dibaba (born 21 March 1982) is the eldest of the sisters. She won the silver medal 10,000 metres at the 2004 Summer Olympics. At the 2005 World Championships, she won bronze medals in both the 5,000 metres and 10,000 metres, and earlier claimed gold at the 2003 All-Africa Games.

=== Tirunesh Dibaba ===
Tirunesh Dibaba (born 1 June 1985), nicknamed the "Baby Faced Destroyer" by the media, is considered among the leading distance runners of her era. She won Olympic gold medals in both 5,000 metres and 10,000 metres at the 2008 Beijing Olympics, and successfully defended her 10,000 m title at the 2012 London Olympics. Her career includes five World Championship titles and multiple world records.

=== Genzebe Dibaba ===
Genzebe Dibaba (born 8 February 1991) is a multiple world indoor records holder in middle- and long-distance events. She has set indoor world records in 1,500 metres, mile, 3,000 metres, and 5,000 metres. At the 2016 Rio Olympics, she won silver in the 1,500 metres and she earned gold at the 2015 World Championships.

=== Anna Dibaba ===
Anna Dibaba (born 26 October 1999) competes internationally in professional road racing. She specializes in road racing and ran a personal best of 2:23:56 at the 2024 Amsterdam Marathon.

== Training and background ==
The Dibaba sisters were raised on a rural farm in Bekoji, a town at an altitude of over 2,800 metres (9,200 ft). The high-altitude environment, combined with an active upbringing that included daily runs to school, has been cited as a factor contributing to their endurance. Initially coached by Derartu Tulu, the sisters later progressed through Ethiopia's national athletics training system.

Bekoji has produced numerous other world-class athletes, including Kenenisa Bekele, benefiting from its altitude, established coaching infrastructure, and community emphasis on running.

== Legacy ==
The Dibaba family has collectively earned multiple Olympic and World Championship medals and set several world records. Their achievements have been credited with raising Ethiopia's international profile in athletics. Sports commentators and scholars have also noted that the sisters' success has encouraged greater participation in athletics among Ethiopian women.
