= Athletics at the 2007 All-Africa Games – Women's 5000 metres =

The women's 5000 metres at the 2007 All-Africa Games were held on July 18.

== Results ==
Rank	Name	Nationality	Time	Notes
1st place, gold medalist(s)	Meseret Defar	Ethiopia	15:02.72	
2nd place, silver medalist(s)	Meselech Melkamu	Ethiopia	15:03.86	
3rd place, bronze medalist(s)	Silvia Kibet	Kenya	15:06.39	
4	Esther Maina	Kenya	15:14.05	
5	Simret Sultan	Eritrea	15:16.33	
6	Workitu Ayanu	Ethiopia	15:33.27	
7	Meraf Bahta	Eritrea	15:56.30	
8	Sharon Tavengwa	Zimbabwe	16:01.78	
9	René Kalmer	South Africa	16:09.38	
10	Angeline Nyiransabimana	Rwanda	16:11.95	
11	Zintle Xiniwe	South Africa	16:22.61	
12	Lucia Chandamale	Malawi	17:15.11	
13	Gadalyie Niyonizigiye	Burundi	17:26.88	
