= 2007 World Championships in Athletics – Women's 5000 metres =

The women's 5000 metres at the 2007 World Championships in Athletics was held at the Nagai Stadium on 29 August and 1 September.

== Medalists ==
| Gold | Silver | Bronze |
|---|---|---|
| Meseret Defar; Ethiopia | Vivian Cheruiyot; Kenya | Priscah Jepleting Cherono; Kenya |

== Schedule ==
| Date | Time | Round |
|---|---|---|
| August 29, 2007 | 20:05 | Heats |
| September 1, 2007 | 20:30 | Final |

== Results ==
| KEY: | q | Fastest non-qualifiers | Q | Qualified | WR | World record | AR | Area record | NR | National record | PB | Personal best | SB | Seasonal best |

=== Heats ===
Qualification: First 5 in each heat (Q) and the next 5 fastest (q) advance to the final.

| Rank | Heat | Name | Nationality | Time | Notes |
|---|---|---|---|---|---|
| 1 | 1 | Elvan Abeylegesse | Turkey | 15:06.26 | Q, SB |
| 2 | 1 | Vivian Cheruiyot | Kenya | 15:06.54 | Q |
| 3 | 1 | Sylvia Jebiwott Kibet | Kenya | 15:06.54 | Q |
| 4 | 1 | Gelete Burka | Ethiopia | 15:07.21 | Q |
| 5 | 1 | Shalane Flanagan | United States | 15:07.47 | Q |
| 6 | 2 | Meseret Defar | Ethiopia | 15:10.13 | Q |
| 7 | 2 | Meselech Melkamu | Ethiopia | 15:10.32 | Q |
| 8 | 2 | Priscah Jepleting Cherono | Kenya | 15:11.22 | Q |
| 9 | 2 | Joanne Pavey | Great Britain | 15:11.83 | Q, SB |
| 10 | 2 | Jennifer Rhines | United States | 15:14.30 | Q |
| 11 | 2 | Silvia Weissteiner | Italy | 15:15.74 | q |
| 12 | 2 | Mariya Konovalova | Russia | 15:16.49 | q |
| 13 | 1 | Volha Krautsova | Belarus | 15:17.64 | q, SB |
| 14 | 1 | Kayoko Fukushi | Japan | 15:19.67 | q |
| 15 | 2 | Jessica Augusto | Portugal | 15:21.23 | q |
| 16 | 1 | Simret Sultan | Eritrea | 15:25.29 | |
| 17 | 2 | Kayo Sugihara | Japan | 15:31.44 | |
| 18 | 2 | Zakia Mrisho Mohamed | Tanzania | 15:33.81 | |
| 19 | 2 | Mary Teresa Cullen | Ireland | 15:40.53 | |
| 20 | 2 | Angeline Nyiransabimana | Rwanda | 15:53.23 | NR |
| 21 | 1 | Michelle Sikes | United States | 15:54.06 | |
| 22 | 1 | Nora Leticia Rocha | Mexico | 16:34.74 | |
| 23 | 1 | Lucia Chandamale | Malawi | 16:35.75 | PB |
| 24 | 1 | Francine Niyonizigiye | Burundi | 17:25.22 | SB |
| 25 | 2 | Gabriela Traña | Costa Rica | 17:45.56 | SB |
| - | 2 | Mariem Alaoui Selsouli | Morocco | DNF | |
| - | 1 | Tirunesh Dibaba | Ethiopia | DNS | |
| - | 1 | Yekaterina Volkova | Russia | DNS | |

=== Final ===
| Rank | Name | Nationality | Time | Notes |
|---|---|---|---|---|
| 1st place, gold medalist(s) | Meseret Defar | Ethiopia | 14:57.91 | |
| 2nd place, silver medalist(s) | Vivian Cheruiyot | Kenya | 14:58.50 | |
| 3rd place, bronze medalist(s) | Priscah Jepleting Cherono | Kenya | 14:59.21 | |
| 4 | Sylvia Jebiwott Kibet | Kenya | 14:59.26 | PB |
| 5 | Elvan Abeylegesse | Turkey | 15:00.88 | SB |
| 6 | Meselech Melkamu | Ethiopia | 15:01.42 | |
| 7 | Jennifer Rhines | United States | 15:03.09 | |
| 8 | Shalane Flanagan | United States | 15:03.86 | |
| 9 | Joanne Pavey | Great Britain | 15:04.77 | SB |
| 10 | Gelete Burka | Ethiopia | 15:07.46 | |
| 11 | Mariya Konovalova | Russia | 15:09.71 | |
| 12 | Silvia Weissteiner | Italy | 15:11.81 | PB |
| 13 | Volha Krautsova | Belarus | 15:11.82 | SB |
| 14 | Kayoko Fukushi | Japan | 15:19.40 | |
| 15 | Jessica Augusto | Portugal | 15:24.93 | |
