= Masters W35 5000 metres world record progression =

This is the progression of world record improvements of the 5000 metres W35 division of Masters athletics.

Key

Incomplete information Pending

Hand	Auto	Athlete	Nationality	Birthdate	Location	Date
	14:33.84	Edith Masai	Kenya	04.04.1967	Oslo	02.06.2006
	14:45.35	Regina Jacobs	United States	28.08.1963	Sacramento	21.07.2000
	15:11.38	Lynn Jennings	United States	10.07.1960	Stockholm	10.07.1995
	15:13.39	Ingrid Kristiansen	Norway	21.03.1956	Fana	04.08.1991
	15:15.2	Francis Larrieu Smith	United States	23.11.1952	Eugene	02.07.1988
	15:23.48	Maricia Puica	Romania	29.07.1950	Hengelo	19.07.1987
