= Courtney Babcock =

Courtney Babcock may refer to:

- Courtney Babcock-Key athlete
- the elder sister of Norman voiced by Anna Kendrick in 2012 film ParaNorman
