= 2003 World Championships in Athletics – Women's 5000 metres =

These are the official results of the Women's 5000 metres event at the 2003 IAAF World Championships in Paris, France. There were a total number of 33 participating athletes, with two qualifying heats and the final held on Saturday 30 August 2003 at 18:35h.

Tirunesh Dibaba, at 17 years 333 days, is the youngest individual World Champion ever.

== Final ==
RANK	FINAL	TIME
	Tirunesh Dibaba (ETH)	14:51.72
	Marta Domínguez (ESP)	14:52.26
	Edith Masai (KEN)	14:52.30
4.	Yelena Zadorozhnaya (RUS)	14:52.36
5.	Elvan Abeylegesse (TUR)	14:53.56
6.	Isabella Ochichi (KEN)	14:54.08
7.	Gulnara Galkina (RUS)	14:54.38
8.	Courtney Babcock (CAN)	14:54.98
9.	Sun Yingjie (CHN)	14:57.01
10.	Berhane Adere (ETH)	14:58.07
11.	Gabriela Szabo (ROU)	14:59.36
12.	Émilie Mondor (CAN)	15:02.36
13.	Zahra Ouaziz (MAR)	15:16.73
14.	Zhor El Kamch (MAR)	15:29.72
15.	Sonia O'Sullivan (IRL)	15:36.62

== Heats ==
- Held on Tuesday 26 August 2003

RANK	HEAT 1	TIME
1.	Edith Masai (KEN)	14:45.35
2.	Tirunesh Dibaba (ETH)	14:45.96
3.	Sun Yingjie (CHN)	14:46.73
4.	Marta Domínguez (ESP)	14:48.33
5.	Zahra Ouaziz (MAR)	14:52.66
6.	Gulnara Galkina (RUS)	14:58.88
7.	Émilie Mondor (CAN)	14:59.68
8.	Jane Wanjiku Gakunyi (KEN)	15:04.00
9.	Meseret Defar (ETH)	15:11.72
10.	Olga Yegorova (RUS)	15:12.41
11.	Kayoko Fukushi (JPN)	15:16.53
12.	Souad Aït Salem (ALG)	15:34.64
13.	Catherine Chikwakwa (MAW)	15:40.10
14.	Simret Sultan (ERI)	16:09.48
15.	Inés Melchor (PER)	17:17.90
—	Lornah Kiplagat (NED)	DNS

RANK	HEAT 2	TIME
1.	Elvan Abeylegesse (TUR)	14:54.95
2.	Sonia O'Sullivan (IRL)	14:55.50
3.	Berhane Adere (ETH)	14:56.01
4.	Isabella Ochichi (KEN)	14:56.63
5.	Yelena Zadorozhnaya (RUS)	14:56.70
6.	Gabriela Szabo (ROU)	14:56.70
7.	Zhor El Kamch (MAR)	15:00.61
8.	Courtney Babcock (CAN)	15:01.48
9.	Irina Mikitenko (GER)	15:06.97
10.	Restituta Joseph (TAN)	15:10.54
11.	Lauren Fleshman (USA)	15:12.71
12.	Xing Huina (CHN)	15:13.50
13.	Hrisostomia Iakovou (GRE)	15:44.90
14.	Susanne Pumper (AUT)	15:53.52
15.	Dorcus Inzikuru (UGA)	16:00.99
16.	Lilian Claber Argereta (HON)	20:17.90
—	Anesie Kwizera (BDI)	DNS
