= Athletics at the 2008 Summer Olympics – Women's 5000 metres =

Women's 5000 metres at the Games of the XXIX Olympiad
- Venue: Beijing National Stadium
- Dates: 19 August 2008 (heats); 22 August 2008 (final)
- Competitors: 32 from 20 nations
- Winning time: 15:41.40

Medalists
1st place, gold medalist(s)		Tirunesh Dibaba	Ethiopia
2nd place, silver medalist(s)		Meseret Defar	Ethiopia
3rd place, bronze medalist(s)		Sylvia Kibet	Kenya

The women's 5000 metres at the 2008 Summer Olympics took place on 19–22 August at the Beijing National Stadium.

The qualifying standards were 15:09.00 (A standard) and 15:24.00 (B standard).

While the race was strategically different, the results were much the same as the 10,000m final a week earlier. Elvan Abeylegesse took the lead early, but the field did not dissipate behind her. Instead, Ethiopians, Kenyans and newly-crowned steeplechase world record holder, Gulnara Samitova-Galkina, countered each attempt to pull away. Going into the last lap, Abeylegesse of Turkey and three Ethiopians were at the front, with the Kenyan team and Russian Liliya Shobukhova trailing. Tirunesh Dibaba jumped into the lead with the expected chase coming from Meseret Defar, in one of the few head-to-head battles between these two stars. But Abeylegesse refused to get out of the picture. Through the final turn she caught Defar and swung wide into lane 2 as if to speed past Dibaba. She was able to match Dibaba's speed down the final straight but couldn't make up the ground she had lost, with Dibaba taking her second gold medal and Defar holding off the rest of the field to take bronze.

On 29 March 2017, IAAF confirmed that Abeylegesse had tested positive for a banned substance at the 2007 World Championships in Athletics and that her results from 2007 to 2009, including her Olympic silvers, had been expunged.

== Records ==
Prior to this competition, the existing world record, Olympic record, and world leading time were as follows:

World record	Tirunesh Dibaba (ETH)	14:11.15	Oslo, Norway	6 June 2008
Olympic record	Gabriela Szabó (ROU)	14:40.79	Sydney, Australia	25 September 2000
World Leading	Tirunesh Dibaba (ETH)	14:11.15	Oslo, Norway	6 June 2008

No new world or Olympic records were set for this event.

== Results ==
=== Round 1 ===
Qualification: First 6 in each heat(Q) and the next 3 fastest(q) advance to the final.

Rank	Heat	Name	Nationality	Time	Notes
1	2	Meseret Defar	Ethiopia	14:56.32	Q
2	2	Vivian Cheruiyot	Kenya	14:57.27	Q, SB
3	2	Liliya Shobukhova	Russia	14:57.77	Q
4	2	Priscah Jepleting Cherono	Kenya	14:58.07	Q
5	2	Elvan Abeylegesse	Turkey	14:58.79	Q, SB
6	2	Shalane Flanagan	United States	14:59.69	Q, SB
7	2	Kara Goucher	United States	15:00.98	q, SB
8	1	Tirunesh Dibaba	Ethiopia	15:09.89	Q
9	1	Sylvia Kibet	Kenya	15:10.37	Q
10	1	Alemitu Bekele	Turkey	15:10.92	Q
11	1	Meselech Melkamu	Ethiopia	15:11.21	Q
12	2	Megan Metcalfe	Canada	15:11.23	q, PB
13	1	Gulnara Samitova-Galkina	Russia	15:11.46	Q
14	2	Xue Fei	China	15:13.25	q, SB
15	1	Jennifer Rhines	United States	15:15.12	Q
16	1	Yuriko Kobayashi	Japan	15:15.87	
17	1	Simret Sultan	Eritrea	15:16.25	NR
18	2	Kayoko Fukushi	Japan	15:20.46	
19	2	Mariem Alaoui Selsouli	Morocco	15:21.47	
20	1	Volha Krautsova	Belarus	15:21.85	SB
21	1	Silvia Weissteiner	Italy	15:23.45	
22	1	Zhang Yingying	China	15:23.81	SB
23	1	Zakia Mrisho Mohamed	Tanzania	15:24.28	
24	1	Dolores Checa	Spain	15:31.22	
25	2	Yukiko Akaba	Japan	15:38.30	
26	1	Jessica Augusto	Portugal	16:05.71	
27	2	Krisztina Papp	Hungary	16:08.86	
28	1	Lucia Chandamale	Malawi	16:44.09	
29	2	Francine Niyonizigiye	Burundi	17:08.44	
30	1	Celma Bonfim da Graça	São Tomé and Príncipe	17:25.99	NR
	2	Yelena Zadorozhnaya	Russia	DNF	
	2	Joanne Pavey	Great Britain	DNS	

=== Final ===
Rank	Name	Nationality	Time	Notes
1st place, gold medalist(s)	Tirunesh Dibaba	Ethiopia	15:41.40	
2nd place, silver medalist(s)	Meseret Defar	Ethiopia	15:44.12	
3rd place, bronze medalist(s)	Sylvia Kibet	Kenya	15:44.96	
4	Vivian Cheruiyot	Kenya	15:46.32	
5	Liliya Shobukhova	Russia	15:46.62	
6	Alemitu Bekele	Turkey	15:48.48	
7	Meselech Melkamu	Ethiopia	15:49.03	
8	Kara Goucher	United States	15:49.39	
9	Shalane Flanagan	United States	15:50.80	
10	Priscah Jepleting Cherono	Kenya	15:51.78	
11	Gulnara Samitova-Galkina	Russia	15:56.97	
12	Xue Fei	China	16:09.84	
13	Jennifer Rhines	United States	16:34.63	
14	Megan Metcalfe	Canada	17:06.82	
DSQ	Elvan Abeylegesse	Turkey	~~15:42.74~~	

=== Splits ===
Intermediate	Athlete	Country	Mark
1000m	Gulnara Samitova-Galkina	Russia	3:39.20
2000m	~~Elvan Abeylegesse~~	~~Turkey~~	~~6:45.41~~
3000m	Gulnara Samitova-Galkina	Russia	9:58.13
4000m	Tirunesh Dibaba	Ethiopia	13:04.77
