= 2006 African Championships in Athletics – Women's 5000 metres =

The women's 5000 metres event at the 2006 African Championships in Athletics was held at the Stade Germain Comarmond on August 10.

== Results ==
Rank	Name	Nationality	Time	Notes
1st place, gold medalist(s)	Meseret Defar	Ethiopia	15:56.00	
2nd place, silver medalist(s)	Tirunesh Dibaba	Ethiopia	15:56.04	
3rd place, bronze medalist(s)	Sylvia Jebiwott Kibet	Kenya	15:57.14	
4	Isabella Ochichi	Kenya	15:57.86	
5	Younés Belkaifa	Morocco	15:58.50	
6	Meselech Melkamu	Ethiopia	16:01.09	
7	Millicent Boadi	Ghana	16:47.14	
8	Francine Niyonizigiye	Burundi	16:47.14	
9	Pascalina Bombo	Tanzania	17:05.16	
10	Lucia Chandamale	Malawi	17:42.06	
11	Sandrine Kengue	Gabon	18:17.05	
