= 2007 World Championships in Athletics – Women's 10,000 metres =

The women's 10,000 metres event at the 2007 World Championships in Athletics took place on 25 August 2007 at the Nagai Stadium in Osaka, Japan.

In August 2015, the Turkish Athletic Federation confirmed that an anti-doping test sample collected from Elvan Abeylegesse, who originally finished in second place, had been retested and found to be positive for a controlled substance. Abeylegesse had been temporarily suspended pending retesting of her "B-sample". On 29 March 2017, the International Association of Athletics Federations confirmed the positive test and expunged Abeylegesse's results from 25 August 2007 until 25 August 2009. Kara Goucher was upgraded from bronze to silver and Jo Pavey was awarded the bronze medal, 10 years after the original race.

== Medallists ==
Gold	Tirunesh Dibaba; Ethiopia (ETH)
Silver	Kara Goucher; United States (USA)
Bronze	Jo Pavey; Great Britain & N.I. (GBR)

== Records ==
World record	29:31.78	Wang Junxia	Beijing, China	September 8, 1993
Championship record	30:04.18	Berhane Adere	Paris, France	August 23, 2003

== Results ==
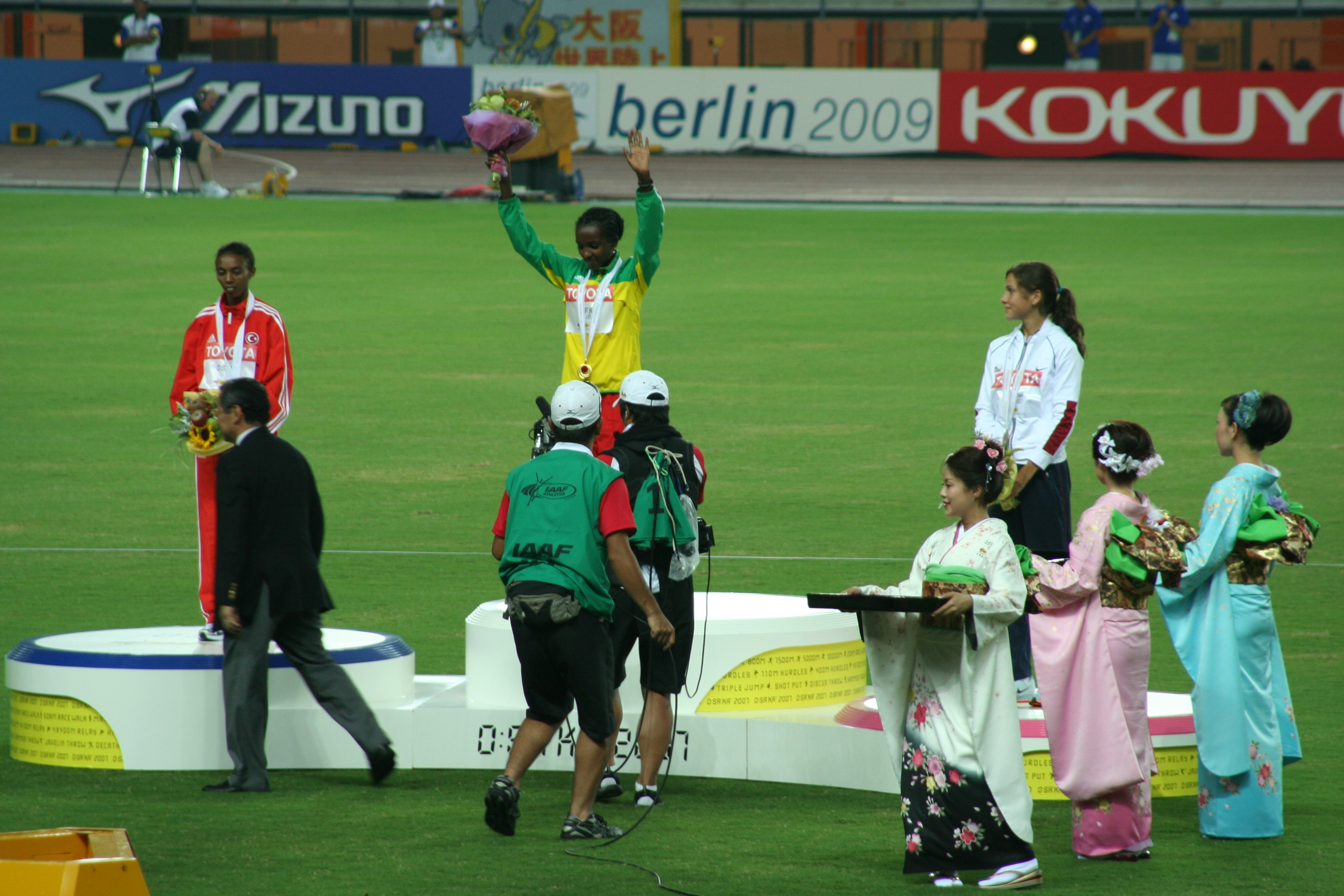
Victory ceremony

Place	Athlete	Nation	Time	Notes
1st place, gold medalist(s)	Tirunesh Dibaba	Ethiopia	31:55.41	SB
2nd place, silver medalist(s)	Kara Goucher	United States	32:02.05	SB
3rd place, bronze medalist(s)	Joanne Pavey	Great Britain & N.I.	32:03.81	
5	Kimberley Smith	New Zealand	32:06.89	
6	Deena Kastor	United States	32:24.58	
7	Ejegayehu Dibaba	Ethiopia	32:30.44	
8	Philes Ongori	Kenya	32:30.74	
9	Emily Chebet	Kenya	32:31.21	SB
10	Kayoko Fukushi	Japan	32:32.85	
11	Nathalie De Vos	Belgium	32:38.60	
12	Inga Abitova	Russia	32:40.39	
13	Katie McGregor	United States	32:44.76	
14	Megumi Kinukawa	Japan	32:45.19	
15	Akane Wakita	Japan	32:48.68	
16	Asmae Leghzaoui	Morocco	32:51.30	
17	Benita Johnson	Australia	32:55.94	SB
18	Aheza Kiros	Ethiopia	33:06.60	
19	Evelyne Nganga	Kenya	33:17.12	
—	Volha Krautsova	Belarus	DNF	
—	Mestawet Tufa	Ethiopia	DNF	
—	Nora Rocha	Mexico	DNS	
—	Elvan Abeylegesse	Turkey	31:59.40	DQ
