= 2010 IAAF World Indoor Championships – Women's 3000 metres =

The women's 3000 metres at the 2010 IAAF World Indoor Championships was held at the ASPIRE Dome on 12 and 13 March.

== Medalists ==
| Gold | Silver | Bronze |
|---|---|---|
| Meseret Defar; Ethiopia | Vivian Cheruiyot; Kenya | Sentayehu Ejigu; Ethiopia |

== Records ==
Standing records prior to the 2010 IAAF World Indoor Championships
| World record | Meseret Defar (ETH) | 8:23.72 | Stuttgart, Germany | 3 February 2007 |
| Championship record | Elly van Hulst (NED) | 8:33.82 | Budapest, Hungary | 4 March 1989 |
| World Leading | Meseret Defar (ETH) | 8:24.46 | Stuttgart, Germany | 6 February 2010 |
| African record | Meseret Defar (ETH) | 8:23.72 | Stuttgart, Germany | 3 February 2007 |
| Asian record | Dong Yanmei (CHN) | 8:41.34 | Lisbon, Portugal | 10 March 2001 |
| European record | Liliya Shobukhova (RUS) | 8:27.86 | Moscow, Russia | 17 February 2006 |
| North and Central American and Caribbean record | Shalane Flanagan (USA) | 8:33.25 | Boston, United States | 27 January 2007 |
| Oceanian record | Kim Smith (NZL) | 8:38.14 | Boston, United States | 27 January 2007 |
| South American record | Letitia Vriesde (SUR) | 9:07.08 | The Hague, Netherlands | 31 January 1993 |

== Qualification standards ==
| Indoor | Outdoor |
|---|---|
| 9:03.00 | 8:38.00 or 15:02.00 (5000m) |

== Schedule ==
| Date | Time | Round |
|---|---|---|
| March 12, 2010 | 14:00 | Heats |
| March 13, 2010 | 16:55 | Final |

== Results ==
=== Heats ===
Qualification: First 4 in each heat (Q) and the next 4 fastest (q) advance to the final.

| Rank | Heat | Name | Nationality | Time | Notes |
|---|---|---|---|---|---|
| 1 | 2 | Meseret Defar | Ethiopia | 8:48.23 | Q |
| 2 | 2 | Sylvia Jebiwott Kibet | Kenya | 8:48.60 | Q |
| DQ | 2 | Alemitu Bekele | Turkey | ~~8:48.73~~ | Q, ~~SB~~, Doping |
| 3 | 2 | Layes Abdullayeva | Azerbaijan | 8:49.65 | Q, PB |
| 4 | 2 | Jéssica Augusto | Portugal | 8:50.81 | q |
| 5 | 2 | Desireé Davila | United States | 8:51.08 | q, PB |
| 6 | 2 | Lidia Chojecka | Poland | 8:52.14 | q, SB |
| 7 | 2 | Adriënne Herzog | Netherlands | 8:53.24 | q, PB |
| 8 | 2 | Ancuţa Bobocel | Romania | 8:54.08 | PB |
| 9 | 2 | Deirdre Byrne | Ireland | 8:58.94 | PB |
| 10 | 1 | Sentayehu Ejigu | Ethiopia | 9:00.34 | Q |
| 11 | 1 | Sara Moreira | Portugal | 9:01.01 | Q |
| 12 | 1 | Vivian Cheruiyot | Kenya | 9:01.35 | Q |
| 13 | 1 | René Kalmer | South Africa | 9:01.41 | Q, NR |
| 14 | 1 | Barbara Parker | Great Britain | 9:01.52 | |
| 15 | 1 | Renata Pliś | Poland | 9:02.68 | |
| 16 | 1 | Sara Hall | United States | 9:04.25 | |
| 17 | 1 | Yelena Zadorozhnaya | Russia | 9:09.52 | |
| 18 | 2 | Gemma Turtle | Great Britain | 9:17.55 | |
| 19 | 1 | Hazel Murphy | Ireland | 9:17.60 | |
| 20 | 1 | Viktoriia Poliudina | Kyrgyzstan | 9:30.76 | NR |

=== Final ===
| Rank | Name | Nationality | Time | Notes |
|---|---|---|---|---|
| 1st place, gold medalist(s) | Meseret Defar | Ethiopia | 8:51.17 | |
| 2nd place, silver medalist(s) | Vivian Cheruiyot | Kenya | 8:51.85 | |
| 3rd place, bronze medalist(s) | Sentayehu Ejigu | Ethiopia | 8:52.08 | |
| 4 | Sylvia Jebiwott Kibet | Kenya | 8:52.16 | |
| DQ | Alemitu Bekele | Turkey | ~~8:53.78~~ | Doping |
| 5 | Sara Moreira | Portugal | 8:55.34 | |
| 6 | Layes Abdullayeva | Azerbaijan | 8:57.59 | |
| 7 | Jéssica Augusto | Portugal | 9:01.71 | |
| 8 | René Kalmer | South Africa | 9:04.11 | |
| 9 | Desireé Davila | United States | 9:07.24 | |
| 10 | Lidia Chojecka | Poland | 9:07.80 | |
| 11 | Adriënne Herzog | Netherlands | 9:12.99 | |
