= 2012 IAAF World Indoor Championships – Women's 3000 metres =

The women's 3000 metres at the 2012 IAAF World Indoor Championships will be held at the Ataköy Athletics Arena on 9 and 11 March.

== Medalists ==
Gold	Silver	Bronze
Hellen Onsando Obiri; Kenya	Meseret Defar; Ethiopia	Gelete Burka; Ethiopia

== Records ==
Standing records prior to the 2012 IAAF World Indoor Championships
World record	Meseret Defar (ETH)	8:23.72	Stuttgart, Germany	3 February 2007
Championship record	Elly van Hulst (NED)	8:33.82	Budapest, Hungary	4 March 1989
World Leading	Meseret Defar (ETH)	8:31.56	Birmingham, Great Britain	18 February 2012
African record	Meseret Defar (ETH)	8:23.72	Stuttgart, Germany	3 February 2007
Asian record	Dong Yanmei (CHN)	8:41.34	Lisbon, Portugal	10 March 2001
European record	Liliya Shobukhova (RUS)	8:27.86	Moscow, Russia	17 February 2006
North and Central American and Caribbean record	Shalane Flanagan (USA)	8:33.25	Boston, United States	27 January 2007
Oceanian Record	Kim Smith (NZL)	8:38.14	Boston, United States	27 January 2007
South American record	Letitia Vriesde (SUR)	9:07.08	The Hague, Netherlands	31 January 1993

== Qualification standards ==
Indoor	Outdoor
9:02.00	8:38.00 or 15:00.00 (5000 m)

== Schedule ==
Date	Time	Round
March 9, 2012	10:45	Heats
March 11, 2012	15:50	Final

== Results ==
=== Heats ===
Qualification: first 4 of each heat (Q) plus the 4 fastest times qualified (q)

Rank	Heat	Name	Nationality	Time	Notes
1	2	Gelete Burka	Ethiopia	9:01.32	Q
2	2	Hellen Obiri	Kenya	9:01.36	Q
DQ	2	Nataliya Tobias	Ukraine	~~9:01.76~~	Q, Doping
3	2	Shitaye Eshete	Bahrain	9:02.13	Q
4	2	Helen Clitheroe	Great Britain	9:02.27	q
5	2	Sara Hall	United States	9:02.49	q
6	2	Alia Saeed Mohammed	United Arab Emirates	9:02.56	q
7	2	Lidia Chojecka	Poland	9:02.93	q
8	2	Kristina Khaleeva	Russia	9:07.13	
9	2	Layes Abdullayeva	Azerbaijan	9:08.41	SB
10	1	Meseret Defar	Ethiopia	9:11.76	Q
11	1	Sylvia Jebiwott Kibet	Kenya	9:11.91	Q
DQ	1	Svitlana Shmidt	Ukraine	~~9:12.39~~	Q, Doping
12	1	Jackie Areson	United States	9:12.62	Q, SB
13	1	Betlhem Desalegn	United Arab Emirates	9:12.63	
14	1	Tejitu Daba	Bahrain	9:15.96	
15	1	Silvia Weissteiner	Italy	9:16.59	
16	1	Dudu Karakaya	Turkey	9:16.85	
17	1	Yuliya Vasilyeva	Russia	9:17.60	
18	1	Claudette Mukasakindi	Rwanda	9:26.89	NR
19	1	Paula González	Spain	9:31.09	

=== Final ===
12 athletes from 8 countries participated. The final started at 15:51.

Rank	Name	Nationality	Time	Notes
1st place, gold medalist(s)	Hellen Obiri	Kenya	8:37.16	
2nd place, silver medalist(s)	Meseret Defar	Ethiopia	8:38.26	
3rd place, bronze medalist(s)	Gelete Burka	Ethiopia	8:40.18	
4	Sylvia Jebiwott Kibet	Kenya	8:40.50	PB
5	Shitaye Eshete	Bahrain	8:51.88	
6	Lidia Chojecka	Poland	8:56.86	
7	Helen Clitheroe	United Kingdom	8:59.04	
8	Sara Hall	United States	8:59.95	
DQ	Nataliya Tobias	Ukraine	~~9:00.78~~	Doping
DQ	Svitlana Shmidt	Ukraine	~~9:03.99~~	Doping
9	Jackie Areson	United States	9:12.50	SB
10	Alia Saeed Mohammed	United Arab Emirates	9:15.74	
