= Sylvia Jebiwot Kibet =

Kenyan long-distance runner (born 1984)

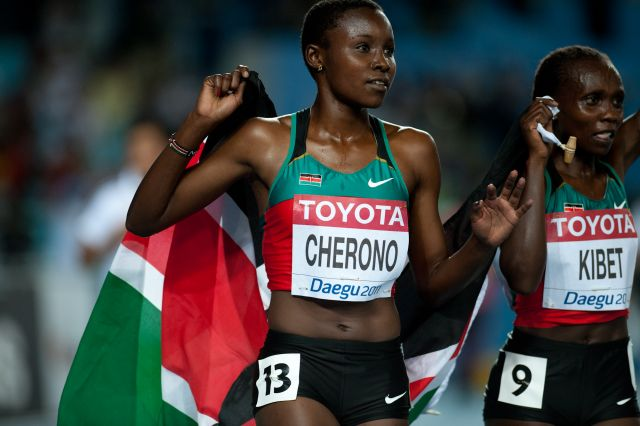
- Kibet (right) celebrating with Mercy Cherono at the 2011 World Championships

Medal record

Women's athletics

Representing Kenya

Olympic Games
Bronze medal – third place	2008 Beijing	5000 m

World Championships
Silver medal – second place	2009 Berlin	5000 m
Silver medal – second place	2011 Daegu	5000 m

All-Africa Games
Bronze medal – third place	2007 Algiers	5000 m

African Championships
Bronze medal – third place	2006 Bambous	5000 m

Commonwealth Games
Silver medal – second place	2010 Delhi	5000 m

Sylvia Jebiwott Kibet (born 28 March 1984) is a Kenyan professional long-distance runner. She was the silver medallist in the 5000 metres at the World Championships in Athletics in both 2009 and 2011. She also won medals over the distance at the 2006 African Championships in Athletics, the 2007 All-Africa Games and 2010 Commonwealth Games.

She has narrowly missed out on medals at major championships on a number of occasions, having finished fourth at the 2007 World Championships, 2008 Beijing Olympics and twice over 3000 metres at the IAAF World Indoor Championships (in 2008 and 2010).

== Career ==
Kibet is from Kapchorwa, Nandi District. Her older sister Hilda Kibet is also a runner, who now represents the Netherlands, as does Lornah Kiplagat, their cousin.

After winning the 1500 m silver medal at the 1999 World Youth Championships in Athletics, she took a break from athletics and married Erastus Limo, a former middle-distance runner. After giving birth to a daughter, she had her come-back in 2004. Living in Iten, a small town 30 km far from Eldoret, she met the Italian coach Renato Canova, and started training with him. She started to reach the international level in 2005, showing improving performances in her preferred event – the 5000 metres.

She won the bronze medal in 5000 metres at the 2006 African Championships and finished fifth in 3000 metres at the 2006 World Athletics Final. In 2007, she won the bronze medal at the 2007 All-Africa Games and finished fourth at the 2007 World Championships, and at the World Athletics Final she finished fifth in 3000 m and second in 5000 m.

In 2008, she set a national indoor record over 1500 m of 4:07.46 minutes at the BW-Bank Meeting in February. She finished fourth at the World Indoor Championships in a new Kenyan indoor record of 8:41.82 minutes. She won her first major outdoor medal at the 2009 World Championships in Athletics, taking the silver medal in the 5000 metres behind Vivian Cheruiyot.

Kibet just missed out on a medal in the 3000 m at the 2010 IAAF World Indoor Championships, pipped to the bronze by Sentayehu Ejigu. She ran at the 2010 Women's 5K Challenge in London but failed to retain her title from 2009, finishing second to Linet Masai. She became the first women's winner of a newly inaugurated 7 km race at the Memorial Peppe Greco, beating Ejegayehu Dibaba to the line. She won the 5000 m silver behind Cheruiyot at the 2010 Commonwealth Games.

In March 2011 she won at the Trofeo Alà dei Sardi cross country race She reached the podium on the 2011 Diamond League circuit once that season, taking third at the DN Galan over 5000 m. She gained selection to represent Kenya for a second consecutive time over the distance at the 2011 World Championships in Athletics. Vivian Cheruiyot defended her title, but Kibet beat Meseret Defar in a sprint finish for the silver medal. At the 2012 Campaccio cross country she was runner-up behind her younger compatriot Mercy Cherono.

Kibet came close to a medal over 3000 m at the 2012 IAAF World Indoor Championships with a fourth-place finish. She was fourth at the Kenyan 5000 m trials and wasn't selected for the 2012 London Olympics. She performed well on the 2012 Diamond League Circuit, having top three finishes in Doha, Monaco and Lausanne and finishing third overall in the rankings. In her 10-mile debut in September, she won the Dam tot Damloop in a time of 51:42 minutes. A win at the BOClassic brought a close to her year.

== Achievements ==
Year	Competition	Venue	Position	Event	Notes
Representing Kenya
1999	World Youth Championships	Bydgoszcz, Poland	2nd	1500 m	4:24.43
2006	African Championships	Bambous, Mauritius	3rd	5000 m	15:57.14
2006	World Athletics Final	Stuttgart, Germany	5th	3000 m	
2007	All-Africa Games	Algiers, Algeria	3rd	5000 m	15:06.39
2007	World Championships	Osaka, Japan	4th	5000 m	14:59.26
2007	World Athletics Final	Stuttgart, Germany	5th	3000 m	
2007	World Athletics Final	Stuttgart, Germany	2nd	5000 m	
2008	World Indoor Championships	Valencia, Spain	4th	3000 m	8:41.82
2008	Olympic Games	Beijing, China	3rd	5000 m	15:44.96
2008	World Athletics Final	Stuttgart, Germany	6th	3000 m	
2008	World Athletics Final	Stuttgart, Germany	6th	5000 m	
2009	World Championships	Berlin, Germany	2nd	5000m	14:58.33
2009	World Athletics Final	Thessaloniki, Greece	4th	5000 m	
2010	World Indoor Championships	Doha, Qatar	4th	3000 m	8:52.16
2010	Commonwealth Games	New Delhi, India	2nd	5000 m	15:55.61
2011	World Championships	Daegu, South Korea	2nd	5000 m	14:56.21
2012	World Indoor Championships	Istanbul, Turkey	4th	3000 m	8:40.50

== Personal bests ==
- 1500 metres – 4:08.57 min (2009), indoor – 4:05.33 min (2010)
- 3000 metres – 8:40.09 min (2006), indoor – 8:41.24 min (2010)
- 5000 metres – 14:31.91 min (2010)
- 10,000 metres – 30:47.20 min (2009)
- Half marathon – 1:09:51 hrs (2009)
