= 2008 IAAF World Indoor Championships – Women's 3000 metres =

At the 2008 IAAF World Indoor Championships, Meseret Defar won the women's 3000 metre run with a time of 8:38.79.

== Medalists ==
Gold
Meseret Defar	Ethiopia
Silver
Meselech Melkamu	Ethiopia
Bronze
Mariem Alaoui Selsouli	Morocco

== Heats ==
Heat	Pos	Name	Country	Mark	Q
1	1	Meseret Defar	Ethiopia	8:51.02	Q
1	2	Kimberley Smith	New Zealand	8:52.81 SB	Q
1	3	Sylvia Jebiwott Kibet	Kenya	8:56.14	Q
1	4	Lisa Dobriskey	United Kingdom	8:56.56	Q
1	5	Yelena Sidorchenkova	Russia	8:57.62	q
1	6	Elena Antoci	Romania	8:58.01	
1	7	Hanane Ouhaddou	Morocco	9:03.41	
1	8	Jennifer Rhines	United States	9:03.66	
1	9	Xue Fei	China	9:03.67 PB	
1	10	Alemitu Bekele	Turkey	9:04.94	
1	11	Isabel Checa	Spain	9:06.21	
2	1	Meselech Melkamu	Ethiopia	8:46.32	Q
2	2	Olga Komyagina	Russia	8:46.64 SB	Q
2	3	Mariem Alaoui Selsouli	Morocco	8:48.22	Q
2	4	Megan Metcalfe	Canada	8:48.56 NR	Q
2	5	Jessica Augusto	Portugal	8:48.81	q
2	6	Silvia Weissteiner	Italy	8:50.30 SB	q
2	7	Helen Clitheroe	United Kingdom	8:52.48	q
2	8	Julie Culley	United States	9:04.45	
2	9	Veronica Nyaruai Wanjiru	Kenya	9:12.68	
2	10	Daniela Donisa	Romania	9:19.26	
2	11	Maria Pia Nehme	Lebanon	10:31.95 NR	
2		Zakia Mrisho Mohamed	Tanzania	DNS	

== Final ==
Pos	Name	Country	Mark
Gold medal	Meseret Defar	Ethiopia	8:38.79
Silver medal	Meselech Melkamu	Ethiopia	8:41.50
Bronze medal	Mariem Alaoui Selsouli	Morocco	8:41.66
4	Sylvia Jebiwott Kibet	Kenya	8:41.82 NR
5	Olga Komyagina	Russia	8:44.57 SB
6	Kimberley Smith	New Zealand	8:48.48 SB
7	Silvia Weissteiner	Italy	8:49.11 SB
8	Jessica Augusto	Portugal	8:49.78
9	Helen Clitheroe	United Kingdom	8:52.77
10	Lisa Dobriskey	United Kingdom	8:52.92
11	Yelena Sidorchenkova	Russia	9:01.81
12	Megan Metcalfe	Canada	9:07.16

Intermediate	Athlete	Country	Mark
1000m	Jessica Augusto	Portugal	2:59.33
2000m	Mariem Alaoui Selsouli	Morocco	5:55.50
