= Kayoko Fukushi =

Japanese long-distance runner

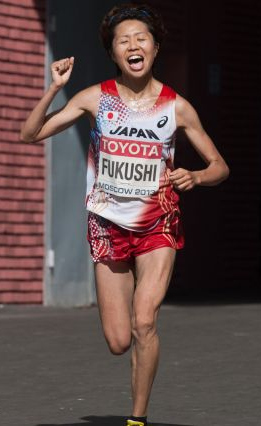
- Fukushi at the 2013 World Championships

Personal information
- Born: 25 March 1982 (age 44) Itayanagi, Aomori, Japan
Medal record
Women's athletics
Representing Japan
World Championships
Bronze medal – third place	2013 Moscow	Marathon
Asian Games
Gold medal – first place	2006 Doha	10,000 m
Silver medal – second place	2002 Busan	5000 m
Silver medal – second place	2002 Busan	10,000 m
IAAF World Cup
Bronze medal – third place	2006 Athens	5000 m

Kayoko Fukushi (福士 加代子, Fukushi Kayoko; born 25 March 1982 in Itayanagi, Aomori) is a Japanese long-distance runner, who specializes in the 5000, 10,000 metres and marathon. Fukushi represented Japan at the 2004, 2008 and 2012 Summer Olympics. She was the bronze medallist in the marathon at the 2013 World Championships in Athletics. She holds a marathon best of 2:22:17 hours.

Fukushi won two silver medals at the 2002 Asian Games and then won the 10,000 m gold medal at the 2006 edition. She is a former world record holder in the 15 km road race and is the Japanese record holder in the 5000 m, 10,000 m, and 10K road distance. Fukushi is also a six-time national champion over the 5000 m. In addition, she has run more sub 34 minute 10,000 m runs in competition than any other woman in the world (as of 2014 this mark stands at 44).

She was chosen as the torch lighter for the 2003 Asian Winter Games which was held in Aomori Prefecture, her home region.

== Career ==
=== Early career ===
Fukushi was fourth over 5000 m at the 2000 World Junior Championships in Athletics and had a breakout year two years later. After a fifteenth-place finish in the senior section of the 2002 IAAF World Cross Country Championships, she broke national junior records (over 3000 m, 5000 m and 10,000 m) and then went on to record an out-right national record of 8:44.40 minutes in the 3000 m that July.

At the 2002 Asian Games she took a silver medal double in the 5000/10,000 m, finishing behind Sun Yingjie on both occasions.

=== Olympic debut and Asian gold ===
Continuing to focus on track running, she ran at her first senior global track competition in 2003. She was eleventh in the 5000 m at the 2003 World Championships in Athletics, but had less success on her Olympic debut as she finished 26th in the 10,000 m at the 2004 Athens Games. She doubled up at the 2005 World Championships in Athletics, coming near the top ten in both long-distance track events.

On February 5, 2006 at the Kagawa Marugame Half Marathon she broke the 15-kilometre road running record by running the distance in 46:55 minutes. Tirunesh Dibaba of Ethiopia improved the record to 46:28 minutes in 2009. During the race in Marugame she also set the Asian record in the half marathon. She had more success on home turf soon after with a win at the Fukuoka International Cross Country. She competed at the 2006 IAAF World Cross Country Championships, also held in Fukuoka, and took sixth place in the long race – one of only two non-East African runners to make the top ten. Her finish also led the Japanese women to the bronze medal in the team competition. She claimed a bronze on the track at the 2006 IAAF World Cup, coming third over 5000 m and took the 10,000 m gold medal at the 2006 Asian Games – her first major championship win.

Despite her continental success, she failed to break through on the global scene, just finishing in (or near) the top ten at the World Championships in 2007 and 2009, and an eleventh-place finish at 2008 Beijing Olympics. She made her marathon debut at the 2008 Osaka Ladies Marathon and led the race up to the 30 km mark. However, her pacing collapsed soon after that point and she ended up in 19th place with a time of 2:40:54 hours, over fifteen minutes adrift of the winner.

She came back to the half marathon in July 2010 and won at the Shibetsu Half Marathon, although her time of 1:12:25 was below her best. Fukushi's track form deteriorated somewhat that year – she attempted to defend her Asian title at the 2010 Asian Games but came fourth over 10,000 m and fifth in the 5000 m. She anchored the Kyoto team to victory at the Inter-Prefectural Women's Ekiden in January 2011, increasing her team's lead in the final 10 km leg of the race.

Her 2011 season began with a third career win at the Marugame Half Marathon. Her main competition that year was the 2011 Chicago Marathon, where she was among the leaders at the halfway point and went on to take third place in a new personal best time of 2:24:38 hours. In her first race of 2012, she was the pre-race favourite for the Osaka Ladies Marathon but finished seventh after a slow second half. Having missed out on Olympic selection for the marathon, she focused on the track instead. She was runner-up in both the 5000 m and 10,000 m at the Japanese Championships and was selected to run both events at the 2012 London Olympics. She placed tenth in the 10,000 m final, but failed to progress beyond the heats in the shorter distance.

=== World medal ===
Fukushi returned to the marathon at the start of 2013 and she was leading with two kilometres to go at the Osaka Women's Marathon. She faltered badly in the final stages, turning a 19-second lead to 23-second deficit behind Tetyana Hamera-Shmyrko. Still, her runner-up finish in 2:24:21 hours was a personal best. This gained her selection for Japan for the 2013 World Championships in Athletics marathon, where she won her first major medal over the distance – a bronze. Although she was aged 31, she was the youngest of the medallists alongside Edna Kiplagat and Valeria Straneo.

Her foremost race the following season was the 2014 Berlin Marathon, but her time of 2:26:24.7 hours only brought her sixth place in the high calibre contest. She did not compete at a major tournament for a whole year, finally returning for the 2015 Chicago Marathon, where she was fourth. She aimed to make the Japanese Olympic marathon team and assured her place with a victory at the Osaka Women's Marathon. She defeated the opposition by over six minutes and set a new personal best of 2:22:17 hours, moving her into the Japanese all-time top seven women.

== International competitions ==
Year	Competition	Venue	Position	Event	Notes
Representing Japan
2000	World Junior Championships	Santiago, Chile	4th	5000 m	16:25.01
2002	Asian Games	Busan, South Korea	2nd	5000 m	14:55.19
2002	Asian Games	Busan, South Korea	2nd	10,000 m	30:51.81
2003	World Championships	Paris, France	23rd (h)	5000 m	15:16.53
2003	World Championships	Paris, France	11th	10,000 m	31:10.57
2004	Olympic Games	Athens, Greece	26th	10,000 m	33:48.66
2005	World Championships	Helsinki, Finland	12th	5000 m	14:59.92
2005	World Championships	Helsinki, Finland	11th	10,000 m	31:03.75
2006	World Cross Country Championships	Fukuoka, Japan	6th	Long race (8 km)	25:51
2006	World Cross Country Championships	Fukuoka, Japan	3rd	Team competition	80 pts
2006	World Cup	Athens, Greece	5th	3000 m	8:44.58
2006	World Cup	Athens, Greece	3rd	5000 m	15:06.69
2006	World Road Running Championships	Debrecen, Hungary	6th	20 km	1:05:32
2006	Asian Games	Doha, Qatar	1st	10,000 m	31:29.38
2007	World Championships	Osaka, Japan	14th	5000 m	15:19.40
2007	World Championships	Osaka, Japan	10th	10,000 m	32:32.85
2008	Olympic Games	Beijing, China	18th (h)	5000 m	15:20.46
2008	Olympic Games	Beijing, China	11th	10,000 m	31:01.14
2009	World Championships	Berlin, Germany	9th	10,000 m	31:23.49
2010	Asian Games	Guangzhou, China	5th	5000 m	15:25.08
2010	Asian Games	Guangzhou, China	4th	10,000 m	31:55.54
2012	Olympic Games	London, United Kingdom	17th (h)	5000 m	15:09.31
2012	Olympic Games	London, United Kingdom	10th	10,000 m	31:10.35
2013	World Championships	Moscow, Russia	3rd	Marathon	2:27:45

== National titles ==
- Japan Championships in Athletics
  - 5000 m: 2002, 2004, 2005, 2006, 2007, 2010

== Marathons ==
- 2013 Osaka Women's Marathon: 1st (2:24:21)
- 2011 Chicago Marathon: 3rd (2:24:38)
- 2014 Berlin Marathon: 6th (2:26:24.7)
- 2015 Chicago Marathon: 4th (2:24:25)
- 2016 Osaka Women's Marathon: 1st (2:22:17)

== Personal bests ==
- 3000 metres - 8:44.40 min (2000)
- 5000 metres - 14:53.22 min (2005)
- 10,000 metres - 30:51.81 min (2002)
- 15K run - 46:55 min (2006) - former world record
- Half marathon - 1:07:26 hrs (2006)
- Marathon - 2:22:17 (2016)
