= Megan Wright =

Canadian long-distance runner

Personal information
- Born: 27 January 1982 (age 44) Edmonton, Alberta, Canada

Sport
- Sport: Track and field
Medal record
Representing Canada
Pan American Games
Gold medal – first place	2007 Rio de Janeiro	5000m

Megan Elizabeth Wright (née Metcalfe; born 27 January 1982) is a Canadian long-distance runner who specializes in the 5000 metres. Metcalfe attended West Virginia University, where she won the 2005 NCAA outdoor title in the 5000m. She was born in Edmonton, Alberta. She was the NACAC Cross Country Champion in 2006.

== Achievements ==
Year	Competition	Venue	Position	Event	Notes
Representing Canada
2005	Universiade	İzmir, Turkey	10th	5000 m	16:37.20
2006	World Cup	Athens, Greece	9th	3000 m	
2007	Pan American Games	Rio de Janeiro, Brazil	1st	5000 m	15:35.78
2008	World Indoor Championships	Valencia, Spain	12th	3000 m	9:07.16

=== Personal bests ===
- 1500 metres – 4:10.28 min (2010)
- Mile run 4:39.12 min (2007), indoor – 4:31.91 min (2006)
- 3000 metres – 8:44.29 min (2010), indoor – 8:48.56 min (2008)
- 5000 metres – 15:11.23 min (2008), indoor – 15:25.15 (2011)
- 10000 metres – 32:40.40 min (2011)
