= Courtney Babcock-Key =

Canadian athletics competitor

Personal information
- Born: Courtney Babcock; June 30, 1972 (age 54) Chatham, Ontario
- Education: University of Michigan
- Spouse: Miles Key

Sport
- Sport: running

Courtney Babcock-Key (born June 30, 1972) is a Canadian coach and competitor in the sport of running. Babcock holds the Canadian Women's 5000m(14:54.96) and formerly held the 10,000m records both set during the 2003 season. She broke the Canadian 5000m record in the final of the 2003 World Track and Field IAAF Championships in Paris, where she finished in eighth place, securing her a spot for the 2004 Olympic Games. Her 1500m time of 4:01.99 was also a top time in the World that year. She is a five-time national champion. Two times in each the 5000m and 10,000m and once in Cross Country.

Born and raised in Chatham, Ontario Babcock trained in the United States. Her father was Larry Babcock a hockey player who was drafted by the Montreal Canadiens. Larry died in 2007. In high school, she was more interested in swimming and basketball, but moved to running in her final year while attending the Bishop Strachan School in Toronto. A full-time athlete for 13 years, she attended the University of Michigan where she competed successfully in the NCAA. She was an NCAA Champion in the Distance Medley Relay anchoring the team to its first win in 1994 and an 8x All American. At school she studied communication and broadcasting and hopes to move into that field upon retirement from running.

Today Babcock lives and trains in Missoula, Montana. A middle-distance runner, she competed for Canada for almost 10 years. 2004 was a more difficult year due to injury problems and a bout of bronchitis. At the 2004 Summer Olympics she failed to pass the qualifying round in the 5,000 meter race with a time well off her personal best. In the 1500 meter she also failed to advance finishing 26th; only the top twenty-four moved on.

She was inducted into the Michigan Women's Track and Field Hall of Fame in 2004.

She coached at the Division 1 level for five years with the University of Montana. In that time, Montana won its first Women's Cross Country Big Sky Championship title in 24 years. She led two athletes to the top 10 in the NCAA in the 1500m and the 3k steeplechase.

== Personal life ==
She currently owns her own run coaching business, Key Running, named after her husband Miles Key. They have two sons.
