= Meseret Defar =

Ethiopian long-distance runner (born 1983)

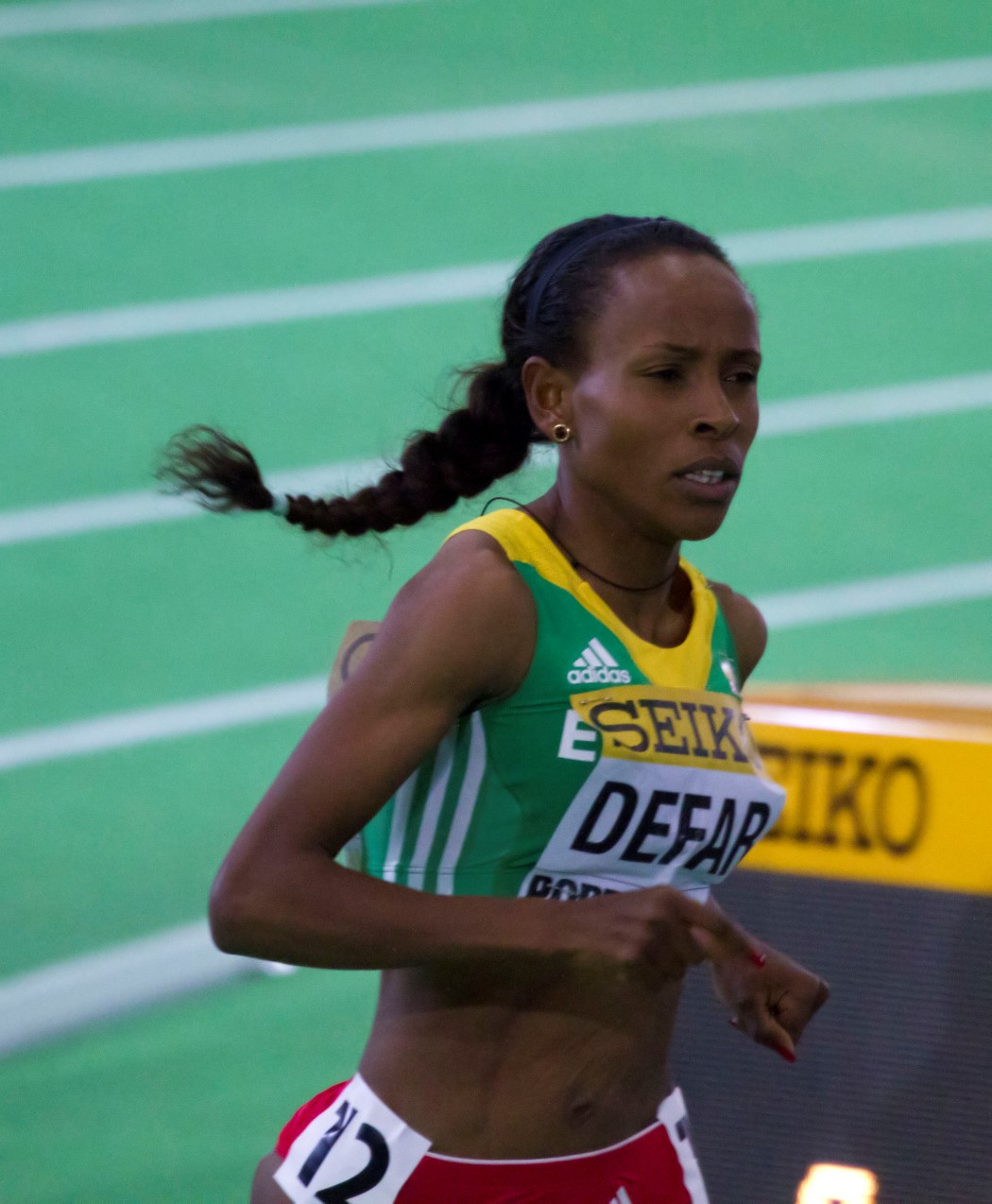
- Defar in 2016

Personal information
- Nationality: Ethiopian
- Born: 19 November 1983 (age 43) Addis Ababa, Ethiopia
- Height: 155 cm (5 ft 1 in)
- Weight: 42 kg (93 lb)

Sport
- Country: Ethiopia
- Sport: Athletics
- Events: 3000 metres, 5000 metres
Medal record
Event	1st	2nd	3rd
Olympic Games	2	1	0
World Championships	2	1	2
World Indoor Championships	4	1	1
African Championships	1	3	0
World Junior Championships	2	1	0
World Youth Championships	0	1	0
Total	11	8	3
Olympic Games
Gold medal – first place	2004 Athens	5000 m
Gold medal – first place	2012 London	5000 m
Silver medal – second place	2008 Beijing	5000 m
World Championships
Gold medal – first place	2007 Osaka	5000 m
Gold medal – first place	2013 Moscow	5000 m
Silver medal – second place	2005 Helsinki	5000 m
Bronze medal – third place	2009 Berlin	5000 m
Bronze medal – third place	2011 Daegu	5000 m
World Indoor Championships
Gold medal – first place	2004 Budapest	3000 m
Gold medal – first place	2006 Moskva	3000 m
Gold medal – first place	2008 Valencia	3000 m
Gold medal – first place	2010 Doha	3000 m
Silver medal – second place	2012 Istanbul	3000 m
Silver medal – second place	2016 Portland	3000 m
Bronze medal – third place	2003 Birmingham	3000 m
All-Africa Games
Gold medal – first place	2003 Abuja	5000 m
Gold medal – first place	2007 Algiers	5000 m
African Championships
Gold medal – first place	2006 Bambous	5000 m
Silver medal – second place	2000 Algiers	5000 m
Silver medal – second place	2008 Addis Ababa	5000 m
Silver medal – second place	2010 Nairobi	5000 m
World Junior Championships
Gold medal – first place	2002 Kingston	3000 m
Gold medal – first place	2002 Kingston	5000 m
Silver medal – second place	2000 Santiago	5000 m
World Youth Championships
Silver medal – second place	1999 Bydgoszcz	3000 m

Meseret Defar Tola (Amharic: መሠረት ደፋር; born 19 November 1983) is an Ethiopian long-distance runner who competes chiefly in the 3,000 metres and 5,000 metres events. She has won medals at top-tier international competitions including Olympic and World Championship gold medals over 5,000 metres. She broke the world record in the event in 2006, broke it again in 2007 and held it until 2008, when fellow Ethiopian Tirunesh Dibaba beat her time.

In 2007 on a track in Brussels Belgium, she became the only woman with a 2-mile run in less than 9 minutes (8:58.58). This was an improvement on the world record by 11 seconds.

Defar has been successful in the 5,000 m at the Olympic Games, taking gold at the 2012 London Olympics and 2004 Athens Olympics and bronze at the 2008 Beijing Olympics. She has experienced similar success in the World Championships, taking silver in the 2005 Helsinki Championships and gold at the 2007 Osaka Championships.

Defar held the indoor records for the 5000 metres, 3,000 metres and two-mile run. She has dominated the 3,000 m indoor event, winning four consecutive gold medals at the IAAF World Indoor Championships from 2004 to 2010. She is also a two-time champion at the All-Africa Games, a four-time medalist at the African Championships and a two-time gold medalist at the World Junior Championships.

Defar took a break from competition in 2014 in order to start a family. She vowed to return by 2015 although she did not compete in the August World Championships in Beijing.

== Career ==
=== Olympics ===
Defar won the 5,000 metres gold medal at the inaugural Afro-Asian Games in 2003. She won gold medals in the women's 5,000 metres at the 2004 Summer Olympics in Athens with a time of 14:45.65 and 5,000 metres at the 2012 Summer Olympics in London. She also won a bronze medal at the 2008 Beijing Olympics, which was upgraded to a silver medal after the disqualification of Turkish athlete Elvan Abeylegesse.

=== World Records ===
On 3 June 2006 she ran the 5,000 metres in New York City in a then-world record time of 14:24.53 – she subsequently improved the record to 14:16.63 at the Bislett Games in Oslo on 15 June 2007. On 3 February 2007 she ran the 3,000 metres indoor in Stuttgart (Germany) in a world record time of 8:23.72. On 20 May 2007 she ran the 2 mile in Carson, California in a world best time of 9:10.47. On 1 September 2007 she won gold in 14:57.91 at 5,000 m at the 2007 World Championships in Osaka, to go along with her Olympic victory and world record. On 14 September 2007, she set a world best (8:58.58) in the women's 2-mile (3.2 km) at the Van Damme Memorial meet, shaving 11.89 seconds off the 9:10.47 mark she set in May at Carson, California. Also in 2007, Defar won the female IAAF World Athlete of the Year award.

=== World Championships ===
She won a silver medal at the 2005 World Championships in Helsinki, losing only to Tirunesh Dibaba. In 2006, she won the World Indoor Championships over 3000 metres, defending her title from the 2004 IAAF World Indoor Championships. In the Reebok Boston Indoor meeting of January 2008, Defar ran a time of 9:10.50 in the two-mile (3.2 km) event to establish a new two-mile indoor world best time, breaking the previous indoor best by over twelve seconds. Defar won her third consecutive World Indoor gold medal in the 3000 m at the 2008 World Indoor Championships in Athletics. At the 2008 African Championships in Athletics, Defar was defeated in the 5000 m by compatriot Meselech Melkamu. At the 2008 Bislett Games, Defar's 5000 m world record was broken by Tirunesh Dibaba. She took a 3000/5000 m double at the 2008 World Athletics Final. Defar began the 2009 athletics season by improving upon her personal bests, setting a new 5000 m world indoor record of 14:24.37 and an indoor world best over two miles (3.2 km) with a 9:06.26 run. She competed in the 10,000 metres event at the British national trials in July, attempting to take a spot on the Ethiopian team at the 2009 World Championships in Athletics. In spite of the wet and windy conditions, she ran a personal best of 29:59.20 minutes – breaking Paula Radcliffe's UK all-comers’ record, becoming the fifth woman to run sub-30 minutes, and earning qualification for the Championships in the process.

In Berlin, Meseret was leading the 2009 World Championships in Athletics – Women's 10,000 metres until the last 50 metres when her legs appeared to dramatically tie up, handing the gold medal to Kenya's Linet Masai and was passed by three other athletes, finishing with a time of 30:52.37. She then ran in the 2009 World Championships in Athletics – Women's 5000 metres final and was leading at the top of the home straight, but was passed by two Kenyan with metres to go, Vivian Cheruiyot and Sylvia Kibet. She went on to beat both athletes in the 3000 m at the 2009 IAAF World Athletics Final a month later, setting a world leading time of 8:30.15 in the process.

Rebounding from her bronze medal championship performance, she scored a fourth straight gold medal in the 3000 m at the 2010 IAAF World Indoor Championships. Moving on to the road circuit, she won her third title at the Carlsbad 5000, although her time of 15:04 did not trouble her own course record. At the 2010 African Championships in Athletics, she represented Ethiopia in the 5000 m and won the silver medal behind Vivian Cheruiyot. SHe won the 3000 m gold at the 2010 IAAF Continental Cup a month later. She made her half marathon debut at the Rock 'n' Roll Philadelphia Half Marathon and succeeded first time, winning in a time of 1:07:44. This mark improved upon Berhane Adere's fastest time on American soil for the distance and was the fifth fastest ever debut.

At the beginning of 2011 she made a world record attempt for the indoor 3000 m and came just short with a run of 8:36.91 minutes. She was dominant on the outdoor circuit, taking 5000 m wins at the FBK Games, Bislett Games and Meeting Areva. Her win streak ended at the 2011 World Championships in Athletics, where she first dropped out of the 10,000 m then was beaten by Vivian Cheruiyot and Sylvia Kibet in the 5000 m, ending up with the bronze medal.

At the 2012 IAAF World Indoor Championships she aimed for a fifth straight title and was leading until the last 100 m, at which point she fell behind Hellen Obiri and finished the race as runner-up. A haul of second-place finishes followed in the outdoor season, as she came runner-up to Cheruiyot twice and fellow Ethiopian Tirunesh Dibaba. In spite of this, when it came to the 5000 m final at the 2012 London Olympics she outran both her rivals to claim her second Olympic title over the distance.

She began her indoor track season in 2013 with a 3000 m win in 8:35.28 minutes. Later than month she ran a half marathon best of 67:25 minutes to break the course record at the New Orleans Half Marathon.

She won her second world title in the 5000m 2013 World Championships in Athletics in Moscow in a time of 14:50:19. She won the race by staying close to the front, but without taking the lead before pulling away with 200m left.

== Personal bests ==
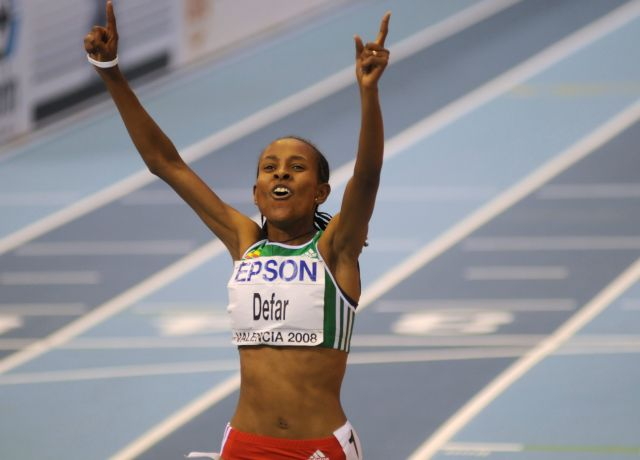
Defar at the World Indoor Championships in 2008

Type	Event	Time	Date	Place	Notes
Outdoor	1500 metres	4:02.00	12 June 2010	New York City, New York, United States	
Outdoor	2000 metres	5:45.62	8 June 2008	Eugene, Oregon, United States	
Outdoor	3000 metres	8:24.51+	14 September 2007	Brussels, Belgium	
Outdoor	Two miles	8:58.58	14 September 2007	Brussels, Belgium	World Record
Outdoor	5000 metres	14:12.88	22 July 2008	Stockholm, Sweden	
Outdoor	10,000 metres	29:59.20	11 July 2009	Birmingham, England	
Outdoor	10 km (road)	32:08	25 February 2007	San Juan, Puerto Rico	
Outdoor	Half marathon (road)	66:09 a	15 September 2013	South Shields, United Kingdom	
Outdoor	Half marathon (road)	67:25	24 February 2013	New Orleans, United States	
Outdoor	Marathon (road)	2:23:33	10 March 2019	Nagoya, Japan	
Indoor	3000 metres	8:23.72	2 February 2007	Brussels, Belgium	
Indoor	Two miles	9:06.26	26 February 2009	Prague, Czech Republic	
Indoor	5000 metres	14:24.37	18 February 2009	Stockholm, Sweden	

- All information taken from IAAF profile.

== Personal life ==
Defar is a Christian who is a part of the Ethiopian Orthodox Tewahedo Church who exhibited her religious beliefs publicly, when celebrating her 5000-meter win at 2012 Olympics by revealing and venerating an icon of Mary and Baby Jesus.

== See also ==
- List of world records in athletics

Records
Preceded by (Turkey) Elvan Abeylegesse	Women's 5,000 m World Record Holder; June 3, 2006 – June 6, 2008	Succeeded by (Ethiopia) Tirunesh Dibaba
Preceded by (Russia) Liliya Shobukhova	Women's 3,000m Indoor World Record Holder; February 3, 2007 – February 6, 2014	Succeeded by (Ethiopia) Genzebe Dibaba
Awards
Preceded by (United States) Sanya Richards	Women's Track & Field Athlete of the Year; 2007	Succeeded by (Ethiopia) Tirunesh Dibaba
Sporting positions
Preceded by (Bahrain) Maryam Yusuf Jamal (Kenya) Vivian Cheruiyot	Women's 3,000 m Best Year Performance; 2006–2007; 2009	Succeeded by (Kenya) Vivian Cheruiyot (Ethiopia) Sentayehu Ejigu
Preceded by (Turkey) Elvan Abeylegesse	Women's 5,000 m Best Year Performance; 2005–2007	Succeeded by (Ethiopia) Tirunesh Dibaba
