= 2005 World Championships in Athletics – Women's 10,000 metres =

The Women's 10,000 metres event featured at the 2005 World Championships in the Helsinki Olympic Stadium. The final was held on 6 August.

== Medalists ==
Gold	Tirunesh Dibaba; Ethiopia (ETH)
Silver	Berhane Adere; Ethiopia (ETH)
Bronze	Ejegayehu Dibaba; Ethiopia (ETH)

== Finishing times ==
Rank	Name	Result
Gold medal	Tirunesh Dibaba (ETH)	30:24.02
Silver medal	Berhane Adere (ETH)	30:25.41 (SB)
Bronze medal	Ejegayehu Dibaba (ETH)	30:26.00
4	Xing Huina (CHN)	30:27.18 (SB)
5	Edith Masai (KEN)	30:30.26 (NR)
6	Werknesh Kidane (ETH)	30:32.47
7	Sun Yingjie (CHN)	30:33.53 (SB)
8	Galina Bogomolova (RUS)	30:33.75 (SB)
9	Paula Radcliffe (GBR)	30:42.75 (SB)
10	Irene Kwambai Kipchumba (KEN)	30:55.80
11	Kayoko Fukushi (JPN)	31:03.75 (SB)
12	Jeļena Prokopčuka (LAT)	31:04.55 (SB)
13	Alla Zhilyaeva (RUS)	31:17.97
14	Katie McGregor (USA)	31:21.20 (PB)
15	Kimberley Smith (NZL)	31:24.29
16	Jennifer Rhines (USA)	31:26.66 (PB)
17	Sabrina Mockenhaupt (GER)	31:28.21
18	Hitomi Miyai (JPN)	31:43.74
19	Benita Johnson (AUS)	31:55.15 (SB)
20	Alena Samokhvalova (RUS)	31:57.85
21	Hiromi Ominami (JPN)	32:02.38
22	Blake Russell (USA)	32:07.00
23	Mihaela Botezan (ROM)	32:28.29 (SB)
24	Dulce María Rodríguez (MEX)	33:04.73
—	Marie Davenport (IRE)	DNF
—	Kathy Butler (GBR)	DNF
—	Alice Timbilili (KEN)	DNS
