= René Kalmer =

South African long-distance runner (born 1980)

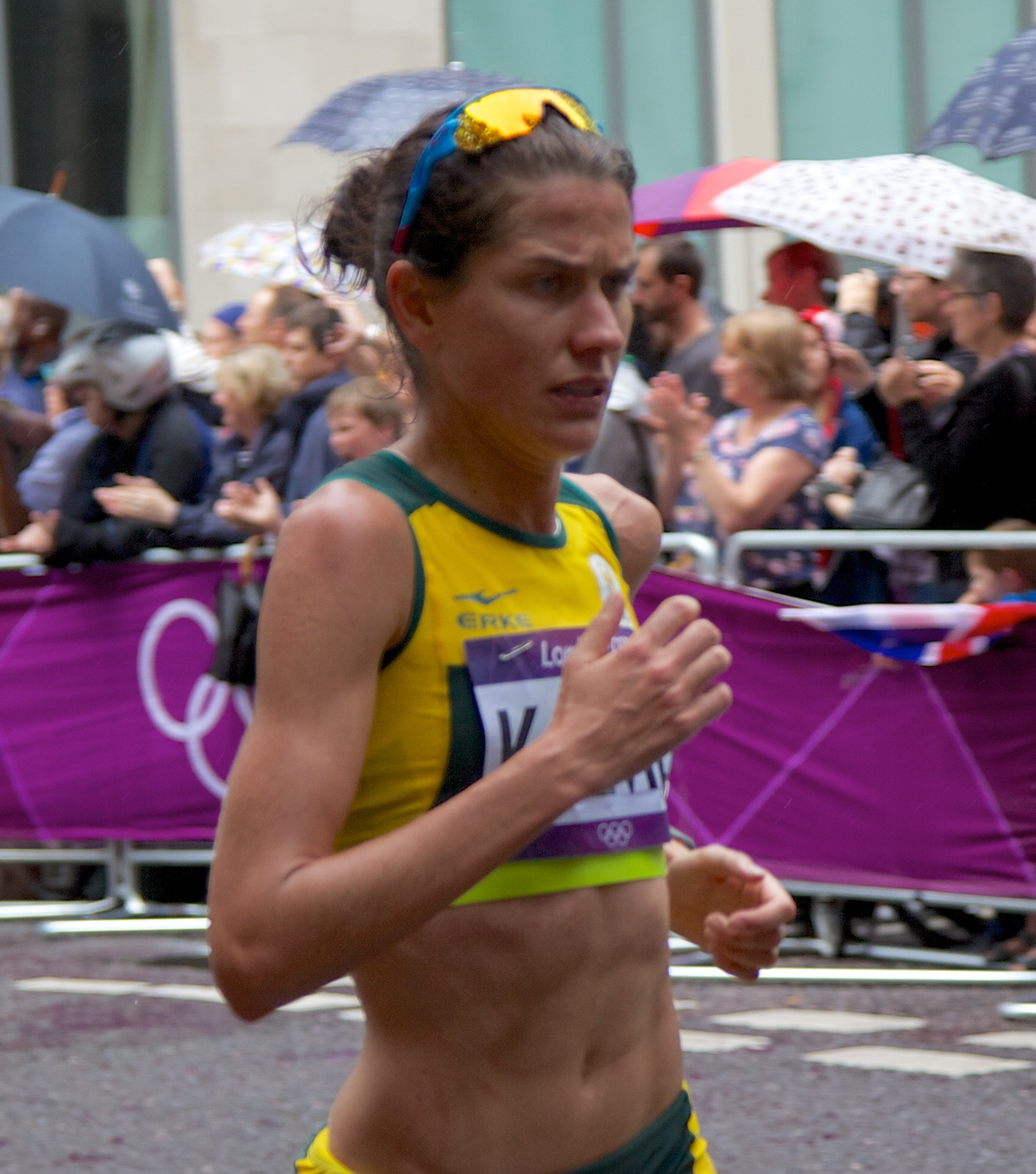
- René in the 2012 Olympic marathon

Personal information
- Born: 3 November 1980 (age 45) Roodepoort, South Africa
- Height: 1.78 m (5 ft 10 in)
- Weight: 49 kg (108 lb)

Sport
- Country: South Africa
- Sport: Athletics
- Event: Marathon

René Kalmer (born 3 November 1980) is a South African runner who has competed over distances ranging from 800 metres to the marathon. She represented South Africa at the 2008 Summer Olympics, running in the 1500 metres. She then represented South Africa again at the 2012 Summer Olympics, competing in the marathon.

She is a two-time participant at the World Championships in Athletics (2001 and 2011) and has run at eight editions of the IAAF World Cross Country Championships. Her sister, Christine Kalmer, is also an international level runner.

== Career ==
Kalmer was born in the Roodepoort area of Johannesburg. Her first international medals came at the 1997 African Junior Athletics Championships, where she was the bronze medallist in both the 1500 m and 3000 metres events. As a junior runner she competed at the 1998 World Junior Championships in Athletics and at the World Cross Country event from 1996 to 1999. Her first senior international appearances followed two years later: she came 30th in the short race at the 2001 IAAF World Cross Country Championships and ran in the 1500 m heats at the 2001 World Championships in Athletics. She also finished eleventh in 5000 metres at the 2001 Summer Universiade. She was the silver medallist at the FISU World University Cross Country Championships in 2002, finishing behind Denisa Costescu. Over 5000 m she was eighth at the 2003 Summer Universiade, ninth at the 2007 All-Africa Games and sixth at the 2008 African Championships.

She represented South Africa at the 2008 Beijing Olympics in the women's 1500 metres, although she did not progress past the first round. Kalmer won her debut marathon race in late 2009, beating opposition at the Soweto Marathon in a time of 2:44:06. She made her world indoor debut at the 2010 IAAF World Indoor Championships: she recorded a South African record in the heats, running 9:01.41, but she could not equal this effort in the 3000 metres final and she finished ninth overall. Domestic success came outdoors soon after as she won the 1500 m and 5000 metres races at the South Africa Senior Track and Field Championships, saying her marathon run had greatly increased her stamina.

Her first major outing of 2011 was at the World Cross Country Championships and she came 31st overall. A personal best came at the 2011 Prague Marathon, where her time of 2:34:47 hours brought her fifth place. Kalmer ran in the marathon at the 2011 World Championships in Athletics and finished in 31st place with a time of 2:38:16 hours. The Yokohama Women's Marathon in November saw her further improve her times as she dipped under the two-and-a-half-hour mark, coming fifth in 2:29:59 hours. She was the pacemaker at the Nagoya Women's Marathon in March 2012 and led the women to the halfway mark with her second best ever time for the distance. A comfortable win over that distance followed at the Two Oceans Half Marathon. She won the Gifu Half Marathon in a course record in May. Having been chosen for the South African team, she placed 35th in the Women's Olympic marathon.

== Personal bests ==
- 800 metres – 2:03.51 min (2000)
- 1500 metres – 4:06.71 min (2008)
- 3000 metres – 8:44.17 min (2010)
- 5000 metres – 15:35.0 min (2007)
- Half marathon – 1:10:37 hrs (2009)
- Marathon – 2:29:59 hrs (2011)
