= Tirunesh Dibaba =

Ethiopian long-distance runner (born 1985)

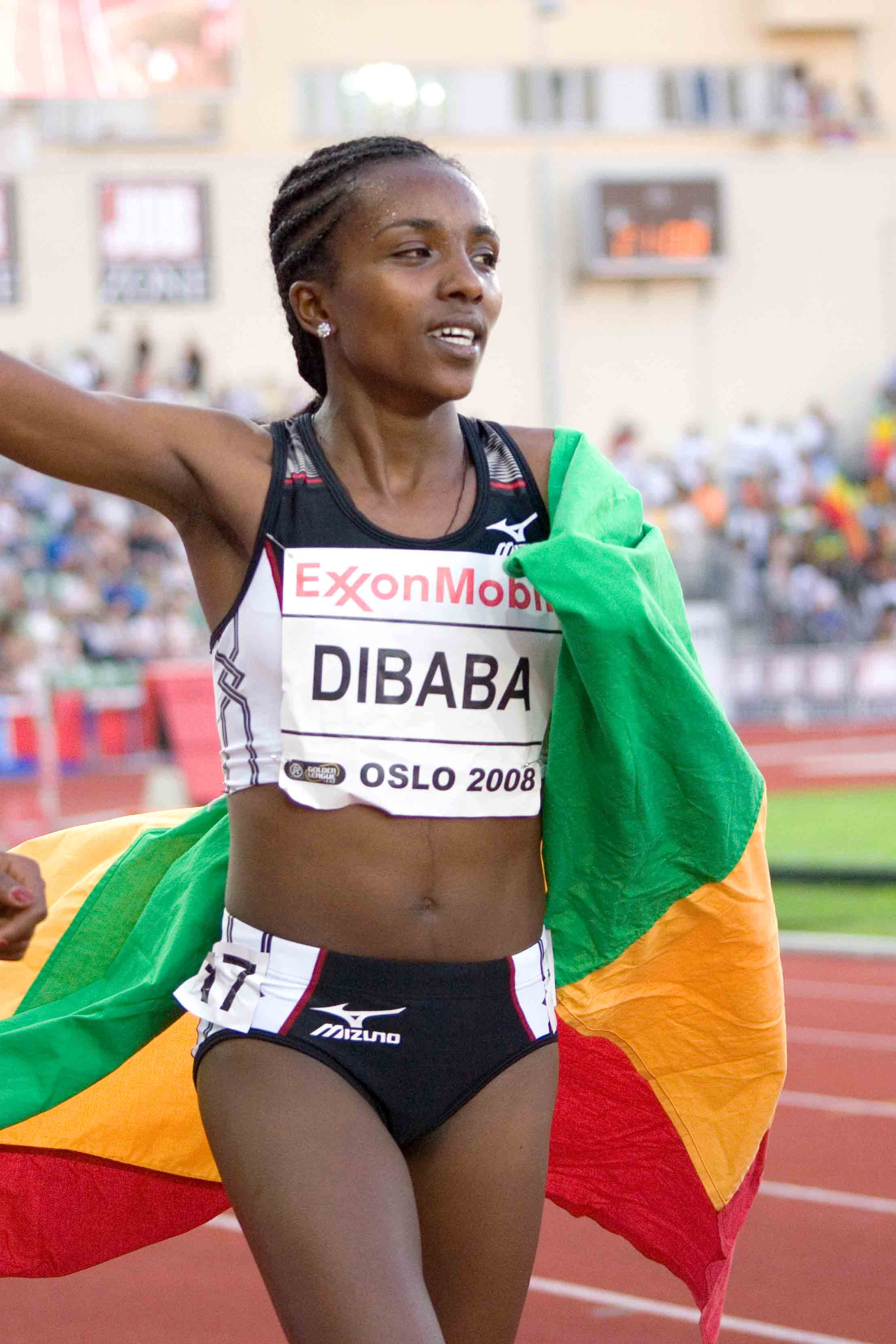
- Tirunesh at the 2008 Bislett Games

Personal information
- Native name: Xurunash Dibaabaa
- Nationality: Ethiopian
- Born: 1 June 1985 (age 41) Bekoji, Arsi Province, Ethiopia
- Height: 166 cm (5 ft 5 in)
- Weight: 50 kg (110 lb)
- Spouse: Sileshi Sihine (m. 2008)
- Children: 2
- Relatives: Genzebe Dibaba (sister); Ejegayehu Dibaba (sister); Derartu Tulu (cousin)

Sport
- Country: Ethiopia
- Sport: Athletics
- Events: 5,000 metres, 10,000 metres, half marathon, marathon

Achievements and titles
- Personal bests: 5000 m: 14:11.15 (3rd fastest all-time); 10,000 m: 29:42.56 (7th fastest all-time); Marathon: 2:17:56 (16th fastest all-time)
Medal record
Women's athletics
Representing Ethiopia
| Event | 1st | 2nd | 3rd |
|---|---|---|---|
| Olympic Games | 3 | 0 | 3 |
| World Championships | 5 | 1 | 0 |
| World Cross Country Championships | 4 | 2 | 0 |
| African Championships | 2 | 1 | 0 |
| Total | 14 | 4 | 3 |
Olympic Games
| Gold medal – first place | 2008 Beijing | 5000 m |
| Gold medal – first place | 2008 Beijing | 10,000 m |
| Gold medal – first place | 2012 London | 10,000 m |
| Bronze medal – third place | 2004 Athens | 5000 m |
| Bronze medal – third place | 2012 London | 5000 m |
| Bronze medal – third place | 2016 Rio de Janeiro | 10,000 m |
World Championships
| Gold medal – first place | 2003 Paris | 5000 m |
| Gold medal – first place | 2005 Helsinki | 5000 m |
| Gold medal – first place | 2005 Helsinki | 10,000 m |
| Gold medal – first place | 2007 Osaka | 10,000 m |
| Gold medal – first place | 2013 Moscow | 10,000 m |
| Silver medal – second place | 2017 London | 10,000 m |
World Cross Country Championships
| Gold medal – first place | 2003 Lausanne | Junior race |
| Gold medal – first place | 2005 Saint-Galmier | Long race |
| Gold medal – first place | 2005 Saint-Galmier | Short race |
| Gold medal – first place | 2006 Fukuoka | Long race |
| Gold medal – first place | 2008 Edinburgh | Senior race |
| Silver medal – second place | 2002 Dublin | Junior race |
| Silver medal – second place | 2004 Bruxelles | Short race |
| Silver medal – second place | 2007 Mombasa | Senior race |
African Championships
| Gold medal – first place | 2008 Addis Ababa | 10,000 m |
| Gold medal – first place | 2010 Nairobi | 10,000 m |
| Silver medal – second place | 2006 Bambous | 5000 m |
World Marathon Majors
| Gold medal – first place | 2017 Chicago | Marathon |
| Silver medal – second place | 2017 London | Marathon |
| Bronze medal – third place | 2014 London | Marathon |
| Bronze medal – third place | 2018 Berlin | Marathon |

Tirunesh Dibaba (Oromo: Xirunesh Dibaabaa, Amharic: ጥሩነሽ ዲባባ ቀነኒ; born 1 June 1985) is an Ethiopian long-distance runner athlete who competes in long-distance track events and international road races. She has won three Olympic track gold medals, five World Championship track gold medals, four individual World Cross Country (WCC) adult titles, and one individual WCC junior title. Tirunesh was the 5,000 metres (outdoor track) world record holder until 2020. She is nicknamed the "baby-faced destroyer."

At the 2005 IAAF World Championships in Helsinki, Finland, Tirunesh became the first woman to win the 5000 m and 10000 m at the same championship. She is the one of two women (the other Sonia O'Sullivan) who won the short and long course World Cross Country title at the same championship (2005 in Saint-Galmier, France). With her 2003 World championship title, she became the youngest World Champion at the age of 18 years and 90 days.

Tirunesh comes from a sporting family of several Olympic medalists, which includes her sisters Genzebe, Ejegayehu and Anna, and her cousin, Derartu Tulu. The matriarch of the Dibaba athletics dynasty, Tirunesh is the most decorated of the family.

== Background ==
Tirunesh was born in the village of Bekoji, Arsi Zone of the Oromia Region and the fourth of six children. She is of Oromo descent. She began competing in athletics at the age of 14. She was raised in the high-altitude Arsi Zone in Oromia, Ethiopia but has lived in Addis Ababa, the capital, since 2000.

Tirunesh comes from an athletic family. Her older sister Ejegayehu won the silver medal in the 10,000 metres at the 2004 Summer Olympics in Athens. As of 25 June 2017, her younger sister Genzebe holds the world record for 1,500 metres, 2,000 metres and the indoor world records for 1,500 metres, one mile (pending ratification), 3,000 metres, and 5,000 metres. Tirunesh and Genzebe are the only siblings in history to hold concurrent world records. Their cousin, Derartu Tulu, won gold medals in the 10,000 metres at the 1992 and 2000 Summer Olympics, the bronze medal in the 10,000 metres at the 2004 Summer Olympics, the silver medal in the 10,000 metres at the 1995 World Championships, and the gold medal in the 10,000 metres at the 2001 World Championships.

== Career ==
=== Junior races ===
Tirunesh's first fully international outdoor event as a junior was the 2001 World Cross Country Championships (WCCC) in Ostend, Belgium, where, at the age of 15, she finished fifth.

Tirunesh finished second in the junior race at the 2002 WCCC in Dublin, Ireland before winning that race in Lausanne, Switzerland, in 2003.

Tirunesh also earned a silver medal in the 5000 metres at the 2002 World Junior Championships in Kingston, Jamaica, 1.05 seconds behind Meseret Defar and just 0.05 seconds ahead of bronze medalist Vivian Cheruiyot.

=== 2003: First World Championships gold medal ===
In May, Tirunesh won the only Ethiopian national track championship of her senior career. The event was the 5000 metres, with Meseret Defar finishing second.

In Paris at her World Championships debut, Tirunesh won the 5000 metres in a sprint finish against Marta Dominguez of Spain and Edith Masai of Kenya. This made her the youngest athlete to win an individual gold medal at the World Championships. Recalling the race, Tirunesh said, "I competed in Paris only because I had the 'A' standard. No one expected me to win. There was no pressure from anywhere. All of them [the pre-race favorites] were looking at each other [during the race] and no one was focusing on the finish line. I just went for it and was surprised that I had won."

In October, she finished fourth in the 5000 metres at the All-Africa Games in Abuja, Nigeria and second in the same event at the Afro-Asian Games in Hyderabad, India. Meseret Defar won both races. Tirunesh said, "I was a bit tired after Paris and did not train well. I was not ready to run those races."

=== 2004: Bronze medalist at the Athens Olympics ===
At the Summer Olympics in Athens, Tirunesh finished third in the 5000 metres, behind Meseret Defar and Kenyan Isabella Ochichi. At age 19, she became the youngest-ever medalist for Ethiopia at the Olympics. She said about the race, "I was a bit overweight and after following Elvan [Abeylegesse] at the early part of the race, I just could not follow the rest at the end. I was not disappointed. I had learned my lesson."

=== 2005: Double gold medalist at the World Championships ===
At the Reebok Boston Indoor Games in January, Tirunesh set a world record in the 5000 meters with a finish time of 14:32.93. This was 6.36 seconds faster than the previous world record set by Berhane Adere. Finishing second was Tirunesh's sister Ejegayehu, over 25 seconds behind. She faded during the last 1000 metres after running with Tirunesh through 4000 metres in a hand-timed 11:46.2. Tirunesh's 1000 metre splits were 2:56.0 - 2:55.2 - 3:00.0 - 2:55.0 - 2:46.8.

Tirunesh won two gold medals in March at the World Cross Country Championships in Saint-Galmier, France. She was the second woman, the other being Sonia O'Sullivan, to win two events since these championships began in 1998.

Dibaba out-sprinted her sister Ejegayehu and Adere to win the 10,000 metres at the World Championships in Helsinki, Finland. One week later, Tirunesh broke the championships record while defeating Meseret Defar and sister Ejegayehu to win the 5000 metres and become the first woman to win the 10,000/5000 metres double at the same World Championships. The International Association of Athletics Federations (IAAF) recognized these two victories as the 2005 Female Performances of the Year. Just before these races, Tirunesh said, "When I won [the 2003 World Championships] in Paris, everybody called me the 'little girl'. I am no longer that little girl. I have matured and certainly am afraid of no one during competition."

=== 2006: Tirunesh-Defar rivalry intensifies ===
Tirunesh won the long race on 1 April at the World Cross Country Championships in Fukuoka, Japan. The next day, however, she was unable to finish the short race.

Tirunesh won five of the six Golden League 5000 metre races, which earned her a bonus of US$83,333. She also won the 5000 metres at the World Athletics Final. Tirunesh and Meseret Defar raced against each other in five of those seven races, with Tirunesh winning four times.

Defar defeated Tirunesh in the 5000 metres at the African Championships in Bambous, Mauritius, and in the 3000 metres at the World Athletics Final.

=== 2007: Successful defense of 10,000 metres World Championship ===
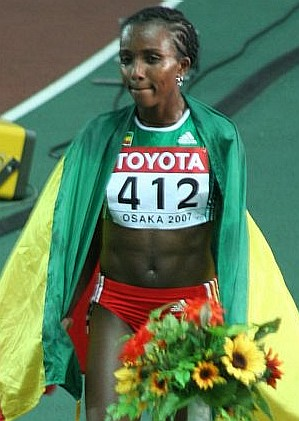
Tirunesh celebrating her 10,000 metres victory at the 2007 World Championships.

Tirunesh earned a US$25,000 bonus for breaking her own 5000 metres indoor world record at the Reebok Boston Indoor Games on 27 January, with a finish time of 14:27.42. Tirunesh's 1000 metre split times were 2:55.28 - 2:53.2 - 2:51.5 - 2:56.68 - 2:46.4. She held this record until Meseret Defar broke it on 18 February 2009 in Stockholm with a finish time of 14:24.37.

During the 10,000 metres race at the World Championships in Osaka, Tirunesh again used her sprint finish to overhaul Turkey's Elvan Abeylegesse, whose second-place finish here was expunged in 2017 for doping. Tirunesh won despite having a mid-race tumble and abdominal pains throughout the race. Tirunesh's finish time was 31:55.41. (Note: Tirunesh's sister Ejegayehu Dibaba finished in sixth place in a time of 32:30.44, which was 35.03 seconds behind Tirunesh.) She thus became the only woman to win consecutive 10,000 metre titles at the World Championships. She did not compete in the 5000 metres.

=== 2008: Double gold medalist at the Beijing Olympics & 5000 metres world record ===
At the 6 June Bislett Games in Oslo, a Golden League event, Tirunesh Dibaba set a world record in the 5,000 metres which would stand for over twelve years, running the distance in 14:11.15. Lucy Wangui Kabuu from Kenya ran a personal best and finished in second place, 22 seconds behind Tirunesh. Tirunesh's sister Ejegayehu Dibaba finished in third place with a time of 14:36.78 (4.04 seconds off her personal best). Tirunesh bettered Meseret Defar's world record by 5.48 seconds. Tirunesh said after the race, "I've been thinking about this for a long time and this is a very special day for me. I was trying my best, and I knew I was going to break the record with two laps to go. The early part of the race was pretty good, but at 3,000 metres we were a little behind, so then I had to catch up on the pace. I could have run faster if the pacing was a little better." Tirunesh's 800 metre split times were: 2:13.7 - 2:19.0 (4:32.7 through 1600 metres) - 2:22.5 (6:55.2 through 2400 metres and 8:03.7 through 2800 metres) - 2:17.8 (9:13.0 through 3200 metres) - 2:15.4 (11:28.4 through 4000 metres)- 2:10.1 (13.38.5 though 4800 metres), with a last 200 metre split of 32.7.

Six days later, Tirunesh defeated her sister Ejegayehu by 0.68 seconds in the 10,000 metres at the Golden Spike Grand Prix in Ostrava, Czech Republic. Tirunesh's finish time was 31:03.37.

Dibaba won the 10,000 metres at the Summer Olympics in Beijing on 15 August. (Note: In her last Olympics, Tirunesh's sister Ejegayehu Dibaba finished in twelfth place in a time of 31:22.18, 1:27.52 behind Tirunesh.) Her finish time of 29:54.66 broke the existing Olympic record of 30:17.49, which had been set by cousin Derartu Tulu at the 2000 Summer Olympics in Sydney. In addition, her finish time was the second fastest 10,000 metres of all time and an African record. The previous African record of 30:04.18 was set by Berhane Adere at the 2003 World Championships.

Seven days later, Tirunesh won the 5000 metres, defeating the defending champion Meseret Defar by 2.72 seconds. (Note: Defar finished the race in third but was moved to the silver medal position years later when Elvan Abeylegesse's result was expunged because of a doping violation.) This made Tirunesh the first woman to win both the 5,000 and the 10,000 metres at the same Olympic games. (Note: The women's 10,000 metres became an Olympic event in 1988, and the women's 5000 meters was included for the first time in 1996.)

Tirunesh was named the 2008 Athlete of the Year by Track & Field News. The IAAF awarded its Female Performance of the Year to Tirunesh and Czech javelin thrower Barbora Špotáková. Tirunesh was nominated for IAAF World Athlete of the Year, which was won instead by Russian pole vaulter Yelena Isinbayeva for the third time.

=== 2009: World record at 15 kilometres during injury-shortened season ===
Injuries prevented Tirunesh from competing in the World Cross Country Championships in Amman, Jordan and the World Championships in Berlin.

On 15 November, Tirunesh won the Zevenheuvelenloop 15 kilometres road race in Nijmegen, Netherlands in a world best time of 46:28. This bettered Kayoko Fukushi's previous world best by almost half a minute. (Tirunesh's record was broken by Florence Kiplagat on 15 February 2015.) This was her first competitive road race since 2005, but she downplayed the idea of moving on to road running, stating that the track remained her priority. Her 5 kilometre splits were 15:58 – 15:25 – 15:05. She said, "Although I trained a lot together with my husband for this race, a roadrace is something different. I did not know what I could expect. Therefore, I was not that fast in the beginning. ... After 10 kilometres, I pressed the pace and in the final three kilometres it felt like flying. It feels good as you hear after the finish that your husband also has won."

=== 2010 ===
In February, Tirunesh ran the third fastest indoor two-mile race to date (9:12.23) at the Aviva Grand Prix in Birmingham, U.K. Her mile splits were 4:41.2 followed by 4:31.1.

At the World Cross Country Championships in Bydgoszcz, Tirunesh finished fourth.

Tirunesh successfully defended her 10,000 metres title at the African Championships in Nairobi with a finish time of 31:51.39. Her last 400 metres was timed at 61 seconds.

=== 2012: Successful defense of 10,000 metres Olympic gold medal ===
A stress fracture in her right leg kept Tirunesh out of competition for 16 months. She returned to racing on 31 December 2011 to win the 10 kilometre San Silvestre Vallecana Silver Label Road Race in Madrid, Spain by overcoming Gelete Burka in a sprint finish.

She won the two-mile race at the New Balance Indoor Grand Prix in Boston on 4 February and took her second career win at the Carlsbad 5000 road race in April.

On 1 June in her first outdoor track race of the year, she won the 10,000 metres at the Prefontaine Classic in Eugene, Oregon, United States, a Diamond League event, by holding off Florence Kiplagat at the finish line.

Eight days later at the Diamond League Adidas Grand Prix in New York City, Tirunesh won the 5,000 metres with her last 400 metres being run in 61.54 seconds. Her winning margin over second-place finisher Meseret Defar was more than 6 seconds.

At the 2012 Summer Olympics in London, she successfully defended her 10,000 metres title with a powerful performance over the final 600 metres, winning in a time of 30:20.75. This was the fastest of the year by any female athlete. This made her the first woman to win consecutive Olympic 10,000 metres titles. After the win, she said, "I have never been happier than today – this is even better than in Beijing". In the 5000 metres, she finished third behind gold medalist Meseret Defar and silver medalist Vivian Cheruiyot, thus failing to repeat her 5,000/10,000 double from the 2008 Olympics. After the race, Tirunesh said, "I'm not very pleased today. I gave it a good shot, but I wasn't aiming for bronze. I'm a bit disappointed."

After the Olympics, she returned to road racing on 16 September at the BUPA Great North Run, a Gold Label Road Race in northern England. She had one of the fastest ever half marathon debuts while winning in a time of 1:07:35. She defeated the marathon gold medalists from the 2012 Summer Olympics and the 2011 World Championships, Tiki Gelana and Edna Kiplagat, respectively, even though both ran personal bests.

Tirunesh closed her year on 18 November with a win at the ABN-AMRO Zevenheuvelenloop in Nijmegen, Netherlands, setting the fastest time that season for the 15 kilometre distance.

=== 2013: Third World Championship in the 10,000 metres ===
In February, Tirunesh hoped to break the indoor 2 mile world record at the New Balance Indoor Grand Prix in Boston. Her pacer, however, quit at the 1 kilometre mark, and she finished in 9:13.17, seven seconds off the record. Tirunesh said after the race, "With this first race [of the year], I am happy. But I could have run faster with better pacing--9:03 or 9:04. I would have liked to have broken the meet record.... Running alone is a bit tough. When I broke the world record at 5000 meters, I had good pacemakers."

Tirunesh had planned to run the London Marathon on 21 April, but an injury to the bottom of her heel forced postponement of her debut at this distance.

She was in good form in May at the Great Manchester Run, setting a course record and an Ethiopian record of 30:49 to win this 10 kilometre road race.

On 1 June, Tirunesh won the 5000 metres at the Prefontaine Classic in Eugene, a Diamond League event that doubled as Ethiopia's trials for the World Championships. Her finish time of 14:42.01 was one-half second faster than second-place finisher Mercy Cherono of Kenya. Tirunesh also finished ahead of five countrywomen, including London Olympian Belaynesh Oljira.

Tirunesh on 27 June ran her last 10,000 metre race before the World Championships at the Golden Spike Ostrava in the Czech Republic. She won with a finishing time of 30:26.67, with Gladys Cherono Kiprono of Kenya finishing second in 30:29.23 and Belaynesh Oljira finishing third.

Just nine days later on 6 July at the Diamond League meeting in Paris, Tirunesh clocked the fastest 5000 metres by any woman since 2008: 14:23.68. Ethiopian Almaz Ayana finished second in a personal best of 14:25.84, followed by countrywomen Gelete Burka, Sule Utura, and Buze Diriba.

Tirunesh was the favourite to win the 10,000 metres at the World Championships in Moscow. She shadowed the leaders during the race until taking the lead with 500 metres remaining and sprinting to her fifth individual World Championships gold medal. Her finish time was 30:43.45, with her last 400 metres clocked at 59.98 seconds.

Tirunesh did not enter the 5000 metres at the World Championships, despite saying in July immediately after her Paris 5000 metres victory that she intended to contest both events. In explaining her decision to skip the race, she denied that she was avoiding longtime rival Meseret Defar, saying, "The [Ethiopian athletics] federation asked us to just run one race each, and that's why I left that race. Both of us have run many times, and they told us that they wanted upcoming athletes to have a chance, and we agreed with that."

On 29 August, Tirunesh resumed her rivalry with Defar in the 5000 metres at the Weltklasse Zürich, a Diamond League event. Genzebe Dibaba took the lead after the last pacer dropped out, but she quit the race with 600 metres remaining. Tirunesh then took the lead, with Defar close behind, before Defar passed her in the last 100 metres. Defar finished the race in 14:32.83 with Tirunesh in second at 14:34.82.

Three days later in Tilburg, Netherlands, Tirunesh attempted to break Paula Radcliffe's 10 kilometer road race world record of 30:21. Although Tirunesh fell short by 9 seconds, her 30:30 finish time was the fourth fastest ever and broke Gladys Cherono Kiprono's 2012 course record by 27 seconds. Tirunesh also broke the Ethiopian national record (and her previous personal best) by 19 seconds.

Tirunesh's final race of the season was the Great North Run in northern England on 15 September, where she was the defending champion. The race was billed as a "showdown" between Tirunesh and Defar. However, the winner of the 2013 London Marathon and silver medalist at the 2012 London Olympics, Priscah Jeptoo from Kenya, won the race in the third fastest time ever for a half marathon (1:05.45). Only Radcliffe and Kenya's Susan Chepkemei had run faster. Defar finished second with a personal best and Tirunesh third in a personal best time of 1:06:55.

=== 2014–2015: Marathon debut followed by motherhood ===
Tirunesh made her marathon debut at the 2014 London Marathon. She finished third in a time of 2:20:35, 14 seconds behind winner Edna Kiplagat and 11 seconds behind Florence Kiplagat (unrelated). Dibaba stopped briefly near the 30 kilometre mark to pick up a dropped water bottle.

After becoming pregnant with her first child, Tirunesh announced on 5 November that she would skip the 2015 season. Tirunesh gave birth to a son in March 2015.

=== 2016: Olympic bronze medalist in historic 10,000 metre race ===
Tirunesh returned to the track in 2016 to qualify for and run in the 10,000 metres at the Summer Olympics in Rio de Janeiro. She did not compete in the 5000 metres at the Olympics for the first time since 2004.

On 29 June, Tirunesh lost a 10,000 metres race for the first time in her career. Almaz Ayana won the Ethiopian Olympic Trials in Hengelo, Netherlands with the fastest time (30:07.00) since Meselech Melkamu's 29:53.8 finish time in June 2009, the seventh fastest time ever, and the fastest time ever for a 10,000 metres debut. Gelete Burka finished in second (30:28.47) with Tirunesh in third (30:28.53).

In perhaps the greatest 10,000 metres race of all time, Tirunesh ran the fourth fastest time in history while winning the bronze medal. Her finish time of 29:42.56 was 12.1 seconds faster than her previous personal best of 29:54.66, which she set at the 2008 Summer Olympics in Beijing. Teammate Almaz Ayana smashed Wang Junxia's 22 year old (and controversial) world record (29:31.78) by 14.33 seconds on her way to the gold medal in a time of 29:17.45. Silver medalist Vivian Cheruiyot of Kenya came within 0.75 seconds of Wang's world record while running the third fastest time (29:32.53) in history. Fourth place finisher Alice Aprot Nawowuna of Kenya ran the fifth fastest time (29:53.51) in history. (She led the race for the first 5000 metres, reaching that mark in a very quick 14:46.81.) The next 9 finishers each set an area record (Molly Huddle of the U.S.), a national record (Cheruiyot of Kenya, Sarah Lahti of Sweden, Diane Nukuri of Burundi), or a personal best. National records for Greece, Kyrgyzstan, and Uzbekistan also were broken. Before this race, a woman had finished a 10,000 metres race in under 30 minutes only five times - but four did so in this race. Tirunesh said after the race, "I had a short time after delivery. Fortunately I got bronze.... This is great for me, my family and all of Ethiopia. The bronze is for my son."

=== 2017: 10,000 metres silver medalist at the World Championships ===
Tirunesh again ran the London Marathon, finishing in second place in a time of 2:17:56. This made her the third fastest woman ever in a marathon. Mary Jepkosgei Keitany's winning finish time of 2:17:01 was a world record for a women-only marathon and was the second-fastest performance in history. Only Paula Radcliffe has run faster, 2:15:25 at the mixed-gender 2003 London Marathon.

She won the silver medal in the 10,000 metres at the World Championships in London in August, finishing 46.37 seconds behind Almaz Ayana. Ayana broke open the race at the 4000 metres mark, running her next 1000 metres in 2:49.18. Tirunesh had been training for this race for only two months, explaining after the race, "If I had followed ... [Ayana], I wouldn't have won a medal. I know my capacity these days because my training for this race was very short." This was the third consecutive 10,000 metres race that Ayana had defeated Tirunesh. Tirunesh's 1000 metre splits were as follows:

- 1000 metres: 3:31.43 (20th position)
- 2000 metres: 3:18.88 (6:50.31) (17th)
- 3000 metres: 3:09.37 (9:59.68) (2nd)
- 4000 metres: 3:04.66 (13:04.34) (6th)
- 5000 metres: 2:56.30 (16:00.64) (6th)
- 6000 metres: 2:59.86 (19:00.50) (6th)
- 7000 metres: 3:02.10 (22:02.60) (4th)
- 8000 metres: 3:05.70 (25:08.30) (5th)
- 9000 metres: 3:04.41 (28:12.71) (4th)
- Finish: 2:49.98 (31:02.69) (2nd)
  - Last 5000 metres: 15:02.05

Tirunesh committed to run the Chicago Marathon on 8 October. She won a gold medal during the 40th edition of the marathon, with a time of 2:18:30.

=== 2018 ===
Tirunesh again ran the London Marathon in April, but failed to finish. She won the Great Manchester Run road 10K for the third consecutive time and fifth time overall the following month. She finished third in the Berlin Marathon with a time of 2:18:55 in September. Tirunesh placed sixth at the Delhi Half Marathon in October and ran the San Silvestre Vallecana road 10k in Madrid on 31 December. She finished third with a time of 30:40. The run was won by Brigid Kosgei (Kenya) in 29:54, the runner up was Hellen Obiri (Kenya) with 29:59. Due to the downhill nature of the course, times set there are not eligible for world record purposes.

=== 2023 ===
The 37-year-old returned after giving birth to a third child running her first race since December 2018 at the Houston Half Marathon in January. She finished 16th with a time of 71:35.

== Personal life ==
Tirunesh is married to 2004 and 2008 Olympic 10,000 meter silver medallist Sileshi Sihine and they have a son, Nathan Sileshi, born in March 2015. She gave birth to a second child named Allon. She had a third child in 2021.

After the Beijing Olympics, her club, the Prisons Police, bestowed the rank of Chief Superintendent for her services to club and country. Tirunesh has an honorary doctorate from Addis Ababa University, and has a hospital on the outskirts of Addis Ababa named after her.

She has ventured into the hotel industry by establishing an eponymous Three Star hotel, which was set to open at the end of 2013.

== Results ==
=== Olympics (outdoor) ===
In these track races at the Olympics, Tirunesh's win–loss record against the following women is as follows:

- 2-0 Gelete Burka
- 2-2 Vivian Cheruiyot
- 1-0 Edith Masai
- 1-0 Ejegayehu Dibaba (sister)
- 1-0 Elvan Abeylegesse
- 1-0 Linet Masai
- 1-0 Lornah Kiplagat
- 1-0 Meselech Melkamu
- 1-0 Sentayehu Ejigu
- 1-0 Sonia O'Sullivan
- 1-0 Werknesh Kidane
- 1-2 Meseret Defar
- 0-0 Aberu Kebede
- 0-0 Ayelech Worku
- 0-0 Berhane Adere
- 0-0 Bezunesh Bekele
- 0-0 Derartu Tulu (cousin)
- 0-0 Emily Chebet
- 0-0 Eyerusalem Kuma
- 0-0 Florence Kiplagat
- 0-0 Gabriela Szabo
- 0-0 Genzebe Dibaba (sister)
- 0-0 Marla Runyan
- 0-0 Paula Radcliffe
- 0-0 Tatyana Tomashova
- 0-1 Almaz Ayana
  - Total: 14-5 (73.7 percent)

| Year | Location | Event | Result | Mark | Notes |
|---|---|---|---|---|---|
| 2004 | Athens | 5000 metres | 3rd | 14:51.83 | 1st: Meseret Defar; 10th: Sentayehu Ejigu; 12th: Elvan Abeylegesse; 14th: Sonia O'Sullivan; DNF: Edith Masai |
| 2008 | Beijing | 10,000 metres | 1st | 29:54.66 | 3rd: Linet Masai; 6th : Lornah Kiplagat; 12th: Ejegayehu Dibaba |
| 2008 | Beijing | 5000 metres | 1st | 15:41.40 | 2nd: Defar; 4th: Vivian Cheruiyot; 7th: Meselech Melkamu |
| 2012 | London | 10,000 metres | 1st | 30:20.75 | 3rd: Cheruiyot; 4th: Werknesh Kidane |
| 2012 | London | 5000 metres | 3rd | 15:05.15 | 1st: Defar; 2nd: Cheruiyot; 5th: Gelete Burka |
| 2016 | Rio de Janeiro | 10,000 metres | 3rd | 29:42.56 | 1st: Almaz Ayana; 2nd: Cheruiyot; 8th: Burka |

=== IAAF world championship events ===
Tirunesh has not participated in any edition of the IAAF World Indoor Championships. In other IAAF world championship races, Tirunesh's win–loss record against the following women is set forth below. Only event finals are counted. A "did not finish" (DNF) is counted as a loss to everyone who completed the race. A "did not start" is treated as being absent from the race.

- 7-0 Ejegayehu Dibaba (sister)
- 6-2 Meselech Melkamu
- 5-1 Werknesh Kidane
- 4-1 Bezunesh Bekele
- 3-1 Emily Chebet Muge
- 2-0 Berhane Adere
- 2-0 Elvan Abeylegesse
- 2-1 Gelete Burka
- 2-1 Vivian Cheruiyot
- 2-2 Edith Masai
- 1-0 Eyerusalem Kuma
- 1-0 Florence Kiplagat
- 1-0 Gabriela Szabo
- 1-0 Meseret Defar
- 1-0 Paula Radcliffe
- 1-0 Sonia O'Sullivan
- 1-1 Linet Masai
- 1-2 Lornah Kiplagat
- 0-0 Aberu Kebede
- 0-0 Ayelech Worku
- 0-0 Derartu Tulu (cousin)
- 0-0 Genzebe Dibaba (sister)
- 0-0 Marla Runyan
- 0-0 Sentayehu Ejigu
- 0-0 Tatyana Tomashova
- 0-1 Almaz Ayana
  - Total: 43-13 (76.8 percent)

| Year | Type | Location | Event | Result | Mark | Notes |
|---|---|---|---|---|---|---|
| 2003 | Cross country | Lausanne, Switzerland | Short | 7th | 12:54 | 1st: Edith Masai; 2nd: Worknesh Kidane; 9th: Ejagayehu Dibaba; 10th: Eyerusalem Kuma; 28th: Bezunesh Bekele |
| 2003 | Outdoor | Paris | 5000 metres | 1st | 14:51.72 | 3rd: E. Masai; 5th: Elvan Abeylegesse; 10th: Berhane Adere; 11th: Gabriela Szabo; 15th: Sonia O'Sullivan |
| 2004 | Cross country | Brussels | Short | 2nd | 13:09 | 1st: E. Masai; 4th: Kidane; 8th: Vivian Cheruiyot; 10th: E. Dibaba; 18th: Bekele |
| 2005 | Cross country | Saint-Galmier, France | Long | 1st | 26:34 | 2nd: Kidane; 3rd: Meselech Melkamu; 10th: Bekele |
| 2005 | Cross country | Saint-Galmier, France | Short | 1st | 13:15 | 2nd: Kidane; 6th: Melkamu; 12th: Bekele; 14th: E. Dibaba |
| 2005 | Outdoor | Helsinki | 10,000 metres | 1st | 30:24.02 | 2nd: Adere; 3rd: E. Dibaba; 5th: E. Masai; 6th: Kidane; 9th: Paula Radcliffe |
| 2005 | Outdoor | Helsinki | 5000 metres | 1st | 14:38.59; Championships record | 2nd: Meseret Defar; 3rd: E. Dibaba; 4th: Melkamu |
| 2006 | Cross country | Fukuoka, Japan | Long | 1st | 25:21 | 2nd: Lornah Kiplagat; 3rd: Melkamu; 14th: E. Dibaba |
| 2006 | Cross country | Fukuoka, Japan | Short | DNF | -- | Dibaba left the race at the halfway mark. 1st: Gelete Burka; 3rd: Melkamu; 5th: L. Kiplagat; 8th: Cheruiyot; 9th: Bekele |
| 2007 | Cross country | Mombasa, Kenya | Senior | 2nd | 26:47 | 1st: L. Kiplagat; 3rd: Melkamu; 4th: Burka; 5th: Florence Kiplagat; 8th: Cheruiyot; 28th: Abeylegesse; DNF: Emily Chebet Muge |
| 2007 | Outdoor | Osaka | 10,000 metres | 1st | 31:55.41 | 7th: E. Dibaba; 9th: Chebet Muge |
| 2008 | Cross country | Mombasa, Kenya | Senior | 1st | 25:10 | 3rd: Linet Masai; 6th: Burka; 9th: Melkamu |
| 2009 | Cross country | Amman, Jordan | Absent | -- | -- | -- |
| 2009 | Outdoor | Berlin | Absent | -- | -- | -- |
| 2010 | Cross country | Bydgoszcz, Poland | Senior | 4th | 24:38 | 1st: Chebet Muge; 2nd: L. Masai; 3rd: Melkamu; 9th: Kidane |
| 2011 | Cross country | Punta Umbria, Spain | Absent | -- | -- | -- |
| 2011 | Outdoor | Daegu, South Korea | Absent | -- | -- | -- |
| 2013 | Cross country | Bydgoszcz, Poland | Absent | -- | -- | -- |
| 2013 | Outdoor | Moscow | 10,000 metres | 1st | 30:43.55 | 4th: Chebet Muge |
| 2015 | Cross country | Guiyang, China | Absent | -- | -- | -- |
| 2015 | Outdoor | Beijing | Absent | -- | -- | -- |
| 2017 | Cross country | Kampala, Uganda | Absent | -- | -- | -- |
| 2017 | Outdoor | London | 10,000 metres | 2nd | 31:02.69 | 1st: Almaz Ayana |

=== African Championships in Athletics (outdoor track) ===
In these African Championship outdoor track races, Dibaba's win–loss record against the following women is as follows:

- 2-0 Meselech Melkamu
- 1-0 Ejegayehu Dibaba (sister)
- 1-0 Linet Masai
- 0-0 Aberu Kebede
- 0-0 Almaz Ayana
- 0-0 Ayelech Worku
- 0-0 Berhane Adere
- 0-0 Bezunesh Bekele
- 0-0 Derartu Tulu (cousin)
- 0-0 Edith Masai
- 0-0 Elvan Abeylegesse
- 0-0 Emily Chebet
- 0-0 Eyerusalem Kuma
- 0-0 Florence Kiplagat
- 0-0 Gelete Burka
- 0-0 Genzebe Dibaba (sister)
- 0-0 Sentayehu Ejigu
- 0-0 Vivian Cheruiyot
- 0-0 Werknesh Kidane
- 0-1 Meseret Defar
  - Total: 4-1 (80 percent)

| Year | Location | Event | Result | Mark | Notes |
|---|---|---|---|---|---|
| 2002 | Radès, Tunisia | Absent | -- | -- | -- |
| 2004 | Brazzaville, Republic of the Congo | Absent | -- | -- | -- |
| 2006 | Bambous, Mauritius | 5000 metres | 2nd | 15:56.04 | 1st: Meseret Defar; 6th: Meselech Melkamu |
| 2008 | Addis Ababa, Ethiopia | 10,000 metres | 1st | 32:49.08 | 2nd: Ejegayehu Dibaba |
| 2010 | Nairobi, Kenya | 10,000 metres | 1st | 31:51.39 | 2nd: Melkamu; 3rd: Linet Masai |
| 2012 | Porto-Novo, Benin | Absent | -- | -- | -- |
| 2014 | Marrakesh, Morocco | Absent | -- | -- | -- |
| 2016 | Durban, South Africa | Absent | -- | -- | -- |
| 2018 | Lagos, Nigeria | | | | |

=== All-Africa Games (outdoor track) ===
In these All-Africa Games outdoor track races, Dibaba's win–loss record against the following women is as follows:

- 1-0 Edith Masai
- 1-0 Sentayehu Ejigu
- 0-0 Meselech Melkamu
- 0-0 Ejegayehu Dibaba (sister)
- 0-0 Linet Masai
- 0-0 Aberu Kebede
- 0-0 Almaz Ayana
- 0-0 Ayelech Worku
- 0-0 Berhane Adere
- 0-0 Bezunesh Bekele
- 0-0 Derartu Tulu (cousin)
- 0-0 Elvan Abeylegesse
- 0-0 Emily Chebet
- 0-0 Eyerusalem Kuma
- 0-0 Florence Kiplagat
- 0-0 Gelete Burka
- 0-0 Genzebe Dibaba (sister)
- 0-0 Vivian Cheruiyot
- 0-0 Werknesh Kidane
- 0-1 Meseret Defar
  - Total: 2-1 (66.7 percent)

| Year | Location | Event | Result | Mark | Notes |
|---|---|---|---|---|---|
| 2003 | Abuja, Nigeria | 5000 metres | 4th | 16:43.40 | 1st: Meseret Defar; 5th: Sentayehu Ejigu; 6th: Edith Masai |
| 2007 | Algiers, Algeria | Absent | -- | -- | -- |
| 2011 | Maputo, Mozambique | Absent | -- | -- | -- |
| 2015 | Brazzaville, Republic of the Congo | Absent | -- | -- | -- |

=== Diamond League, Golden League (outdoor track) ===
Since 2010, the Diamond League has been an annual series of athletics meetings organised by the IAAF around the world. The Golden League was an annual series of athletics meetings organised by the IAAF in Europe from 1998 through 2009.

In these Golden League and Diamond League races, Dibaba's win–loss record against the following women is as follows:

- 9-2 Ejegayehu Dibaba (sister)
- 7-0 Meselech Melkamu
- 7-5 Meseret Defar
- 6-0 Edith Masai
- 6-0 Sentayehu Ejigu
- 5-3 Berhane Adere
- 4-0 Vivian Cheruiyot
- 3-0 Florence Kiplagat
- 3-3 Werknesh Kidane
- 2-0 Bezunesh Bekele
- 2-0 Eyerusalem Kuma
- 2-0 Genzebe Dibaba (sister)
- 2-0 Linet Masai
- 1-0 Aberu Kebede
- 1-0 Almaz Ayana
- 1-0 Derartu Tulu (cousin)
- 1-0 Emily Chebet Muge
- 1-0 Lornah Kiplagat
- 1-1 Tatyana Tomashova
- 1-2 Ayelech Worku
- 1-2 Elvan Abeylegesse
- 0-0 Gelete Burka
- 0-0 Marla Runyan
- 0-0 Paula Radcliffe
- 0-0 Sonia O'Sullivan
- 0-2 Gabriela Szabo
  - Total: 66-20 (76.7 percent)

| Year | Series | Meeting | Event | Result | Mark | Notes |
|---|---|---|---|---|---|---|
| 2002 | Golden League | Brussels | 3000 metres | 11th | 8:41.86 | 1st: Berhane Adere; 2nd: Gabriela Szabo; 3rd: Tatyana Tomashova; 6th: Elvan Abeylegesse; 7th: Ayelech Worku; 10th: Meseret Defar |
| 2002 | Golden League | Berlin | 5000 metres | 6th | 14:49.90 | 1st: Adere; 2nd: Werknesh Kidane; 5th: Worku; 7th: Sentayehu Ejigu; 8th: Tomashova; 12th: Abeylegesse |
| 2003 | Golden League | Oslo | 5000 metres | 3rd | 14:39.94; Junior world record | 1st: Adere; 2nd: Kidane; 4th: Defar; 10th: Eyerusalem Kuma |
| 2003 | Golden League | Rome | 5000 metres | 4th | 14:41.97 | 1st: Defar; 2nd: Szabo; 3rd: Ejegayehu Dibaba; 6th: Adere; 11th: Worku; 13th: Ejigu; 19th: Kuma |
| 2004 | Golden League | Bergen | 5000 metres | 2nd | 14:30.88; Junior world record | Held in Bergen because of Oslo stadium renovation. 1st: Abeylegesse 14:24.68 (world record); 3rd: E. Dibaba; 5th: Derartu Tulu; 6th: Defar; 13th: Meselech Melkamu |
| 2004 | Golden League | Rome | 5000 metres | 4th | 14:47.43 | 1st: E. Dibaba; 2nd: Kidane; 3rd: Defar; 5th: Edith Masai; 9th: Lornah Kiplagat; 10th: Ejigu |
| 2005 | Golden League | Rome | 5000 metres | 1st | 14:32.57 | 2nd: Adere; 3rd: Defar; 4th: E. Masai; 5th: E. Dibaba; 6th: Melkamu; 9th: Ejigu; 10th: Burka; 16th: Kidane; 20th: Bezunesh Bekele |
| 2006 | Golden League | Oslo | 5000 metres | 1st | 14:30.40 | 2nd: E. Dibaba; 3rd: E. Masai; 5th: Melkamu; 6th: Burka |
| 2006 | Golden League | Paris | 5000 metres | 1st | 14:54.24 | 2nd: Defar; 3rd: Burka; 4th: Adere; 7th: E.. Masai; 8th: E. Dibaba; 10th: Vivian Cheruiyot |
| 2006 | Golden League | Rome | 5000 metres | 1st | 14:52.37 | 2nd: Defar; 3rd: Burka; 4th: Adere; 9th: E. Dibaba; 10th: E. Masai; 14th: Bekele |
| 2006 | Golden League | Zurich | 5000 metres | 1st | 14:45.73 | 2nd: E. Masaii; 3rd: Adere; 5th: Cheruiyot |
| 2006 | Golden League | Brussels | 5000 metres | 1st | 14:30.63 | 2nd: Defar; 5th: Cheruiyot; 6th: Melkamu; 7th: E. Dibaba |
| 2006 | Golden League | Berlin | 5000 metres | 2nd | 15:02.87 | 1st: Defar; 3rd: Melkamu; 4th: Burka |
| 2007 | Golden League | Paris | 5000 metres | 1st | 15:21.84 | 2nd: Florence Kiplagat; 3rd: Melkamu; 5th: E. Dibaba |
| 2008 | Golden League | Oslo | 5000 metres | 1st | 14:11.15; World record | 3rd: E. Dibaba; 6th: Genzebe Dibaba |
| 2008 | Golden League | Rome | 5000 metres | 1st | 14:36.58 | 2nd: Melkamu; 6th: E. Dibaba |
| 2009 | Golden League | (Did not participate) | -- | -- | -- | -- |
| 2010 | Diamond League | New York City | 5000 metres | 1st | 15:11.34 | 2nd: Ejigu |
| 2010 | Diamond League | Eugene, United States | 5000 metres | 1st | 14:34.07 | None |
| 2010 | Diamond League | London | 5000 metres | 1st | 14:36.41 | 2nd: Cheruiyot; 3rd: Ejigu; 5th: Linet Masai; 12th: F. Kiplagat |
| 2011 | Diamond League | (Did not participate) | -- | -- | -- | -- |
| 2012 | Diamond League | Eugene, United States | 10,000 metres | 1st | 30:24.39 | 2nd: F. Kiplagat; 4th: Kidane; 5th: Aberu Kebede |
| 2012 | Diamond League | New York City | 5000 metres | 1st | 14:50.80 | 2nd: Defar; 3rd: Burka; 4th: Kidane |
| 2013 | Diamond League | Eugene, United States | 5000 metres | 1st | 14:42.01 | 5th: Burka; 8th: L. Masai |
| 2013 | Diamond League | Paris | 5000 metres | 1st | 14:23.68 | 2nd: Almaz Ayana; 3rd: Burka |
| 2013 | Diamond League | Zurich | 5000 metres | 2nd | 14:34.82 | 1st: Defar; 4th: Emily Chebet Muge; DNF: G. Dibaba |
| 2014; 2015; 2016 | Diamond League | (Did not participate) | -- | -- | -- | -- |

=== World Athletics Finals (outdoor track) ===
World Athletics Final was an annual athletics competition organised by the IAAF from 2003 to 2009. In these races, Dibaba's win–loss record against the following women is as follows:

- 3-0 Vivian Cheruiyot
- 2-0 Ejegayehu Dibaba (sister)
- 2-0 Meselech Melkamu
- 2-0 Sentayehu Ejigu
- 1-0 Berhane Adere
- 1-0 Edith Masai
- 1-0 Gelete Burka
- 1-0 Werknesh Kidane
- 1-3 Meseret Defar
- 0-0 Aberu Kebede
- 0-0 Almaz Ayana
- 0-0 Ayelech Worku
- 0-0 Bezunesh Bekele
- 0-0 Eyerusalem Kuma
- 0-0 Florence Kiplagat
- 0-0 Gabriela Szabo
- 0-0 Genzebe Dibaba (sister)
- 0-0 Linet Masai
- 0-0 Marla Runyan
- 0-0 Paula Radcliffe
- 0-0 Sonia O'Sullivan
- 0-0 Tatyana Tomashova
- 0-1 Derartu Tulu (cousin)
- 0-1 Elvan Abeylegesse
  - Total: 14-5 (73.7 percent)

| Year | Location | Event | Result | Mark | Notes |
|---|---|---|---|---|---|
| 2003 | Monaco | 5000 metres | 3rd | 14:57.87 | 1st: Elvan Abeylegesse; 2nd: Derartu Tulu; 4th: Werknesh Kidane; 7th: Sentayehu Ejigu |
| 2004 | Monaco | Absent | -- | -- | -- |
| 2005 | Monaco | 5000 metres | 2nd | 14:46.84 | 1st: Meseret Defar; 3rd: Berhane Adere; DNF: Ejegayehu Dibaba |
| 2006 | Stuttgart | 5000 metres | 1st | 16:04.77 | 2nd: Defar; 4th: E. Dibaba; 5th: Vivian Cheruiyot; 6th: Meselech Melkamu; 7th: Edith Masai |
| 2006 | Stuttgart | 3000 metres | 2nd | 8:34.74 | 1st: Defar; 3rd: Cheruiyot; 6th: Gelete Burka |
| 2007; 2008 | Stuttgart | Absent | -- | -- | -- |
| 2009 | Thessaloniki | 5000 metres | 2nd | 15:25.92 | 1st: Defar; 3rd: Cheruiyot; 6th: Ejigu; 9th: Melkamu |

=== Grand Prix, World Athletics Challenge (outdoor track) ===
In these Grand Prix and World Athletics Challenge races, Dibaba's win–loss record against the following women is as follows:

- 5-0 Ejegayehu Dibaba (sister)
- 3-0 Genzebe Dibaba (sister)
- 3-0 Meselech Melkamu
- 3-0 Sentayehu Ejigu
- 2-0 Vivian Cheruiyot
- 2-1 Berhane Adere
- 2-1 Linet Masai
- 1-0 Bezunesh Bekele
- 1-0 Florence Kiplagat
- 1-0 Gelete Burka
- 1-1 Marla Runyan
- 1-2 Sonia O'Sullivan
- 1-2 Werknesh Kidane
- 0-0 Aberu Kebede
- 0-0 Almaz Ayana
- 0-0 Ayelech Worku
- 0-0 Derartu Tulu (cousin)
- 0-0 Edith Masai
- 0-0 Elvan Abeylegesse
- 0-0 Eyerusalem Kuma
- 0-0 Paula Radcliffe
- 0-1 Gabriela Szabo
- 0-1 Tatyana Tomashova
- 0-2 Meseret Defar
  - Total: 26-11 (70.3 percent)

| Year | Series | Meeting | Event | Result | Mark | Notes |
|---|---|---|---|---|---|---|
| 2002 | Grand Prix II | Portland, United States | 5000 metres | 1st | 15:13.78 | 2nd: Marla Runyan; 4th: Werknesh Kidane |
| 2002 | Grand Prix I | Eugene, United States | 3000 metres | 4th | 8:42.57 | 1st: Runyan; 2nd: Sonia O'Sullivan; 3rd: Kidane |
| 2002 | Grand Prix I | London | 5000 metres | 4th | 15:04.54 | 1st: Berhane Adere; 2nd: Gabriela Szabo; 3rd: O'Sullivan |
| 2003 | Grand Prix II | Portland, United States | 5000 metres | 2nd | 15:01.44 | 1st: Meseret Defar; 3rd: Sentayehu Ejigu |
| 2003 | Super Grand Prix | Lausanne | 3000 metres | 5th | 8:50.20 | 1st: Yelena Zadorozhnaya; 2nd: Defar; 3rd: Tatyana Tomashova; 4th: Kidane; 7th: Ejigu; 9th: O'Sullivan |
| 2004 | (Did not participate) | -- | -- | -- | -- | -- |
| 2005 | Super Grand Prix | Sheffield, United Kingdom | 5000 metres | 1st | 14:51.77 | 2nd: Ejegayehu Dibaba |
| 2006 | Super Grand Prix | Gateshead, United Kingdom | 3000 metres | 1st | 8:42.04 | 2nd: Adere; 3rd: E. Dibaba; 6th: Bezunesh Bekele; 9th: Vivian Cheruiyot |
| 2006 | Super Grand Prix | London | 3000 metres | 1st | 8:29.55 (personal best) | 2nd: Adere; 3rd: E. Dibaba; 5th: Cheruiyot; 6th: Meselech Melkamu |
| 2006 | Golden Grand Prix | Shanghai | 5000 metres | 1st | 14:55.63 | 2nd: Gelete Burka; 4th: Melkamu; 12th: Florence Kiplagat |
| 2007 | Grand Prix | New York City | 5000 metres | 1st | 14:35.67 | 10th: Genzebe Dibaba |
| 2008 | Grand Prix | Ostrava, Czech Republic | 10,000 metres | 1st | 31:03.37 | 2nd: E. Dibaba; 3rd: Melkamu; 7th: Linet Masai |
| 2008 | Grand Prix | Rieti, Italy | 5000 metres | 1st | 14:23.46 | 3rd: G. Dibaba |
| 2009 | Grand Prix | New York City | 5000 metres | 2nd | 14:40.93 | 1st: L. Masai; 3rd: G. Dibaba |
| 2009 | Super Grand Prix | London | 5000 metres | 1st | 14:33.65 | 2nd: Ejigu; DNF: E. Dibaba |
| 2010; 2011; 2012 | (Did not participate) | -- | -- | -- | -- | -- |
| 2013 | World Challenge | Ostrava, Czech Republic | 10,000 metres | 1st | 30:26.67 | 6th: L. Masai |
| 2014; 2015; 2016 | (Did not participate) | -- | -- | -- | -- | -- |

=== Other outdoor track & cross country races ===
In these outdoor track and cross country races, Dibaba's win–loss record against the following women is as follows:

- 5-1 Werknesh Kidane
- 4-0 Ejegayehu Dibaba (sister)
- 3-0 Eyerusalem Kuma
- 3-1 Meselech Melkamu
- 2-0 Bezunesh Bekele
- 2-0 Meseret Defar
- 2-0 Sentayehu Ejigu
- 2-0 Vivian Cheruiyot
- 1-0 Derartu Tulu (cousin)
- 1-0 Elvan Abeylegesse
- 1-0 Lornah Kiplagat
- 1-0 Sonia O'Sullivan
- 0-0 Aberu Kebede
- 0-0 Almaz Ayana
- 0-0 Ayelech Worku
- 0-0 Berhane Adere
- 0-0 Edith Masai
- 0-0 Florence Kiplagat
- 0-0 Gabriela Szabo
- 0-0 Genzebe Dibaba (sister)
- 0-0 Linet Masai
- 0-0 Marla Runyan
- 0-0 Paula Radcliffe
- 0-0 Tatyana Tomashova
- 0-2 Gelete Burka
  - Total: 27-4 (87.1 percent)

| Year | Location | Event | Result | Mark | Notes |
|---|---|---|---|---|---|
| 2003 | Jan Meda International Cross Country; Addis Ababa, Ethiopia | Cross country: short race | 1st | 13:16.54 | 2nd: Werknesh Kidane; 3rd: Eyerusalem Kuma; 4th: Bezunesh Bekele; 6th: E. Dibaba |
| 2003 | Ethiopian Athletics Championships; Addis Ababa, Ethiopia | 5000 metres | 1st | 16:01.48 | 2nd: Meseret Defar; 3rd: Kuma |
| 2003 | Yokohama Super Track and Field Meet; Yokohama, Japan | 5000 metres | 2nd | 15:11.05 | 1st: Lucy Wangui Kabuu; 3rd: Kidane |
| 2004 | Great North Cross Country; Newcastle upon Tyne, United Kingdom | Cross country | 1st | 21:01 | 2nd: Elvan Abeylegesse; 3rd: Derartu Tulu; 13th: Vivian Cheruiyot |
| 2004 | Jan Meda International Cross Country; Addis Ababa, Ethiopia | Cross country: long race | 3rd | 28:47.94 | 1st: Kidane; 4th: Kuma |
| 2004 | Ethiopian Athletics Championships; Addis Ababa, Ethiopia | 5000 metres | 2nd | 16:03.15 | 1st: Meselech Melkamu; 3rd: Sentayehu Ejigu; DNF: Defar |
| 2005 | Great Edinburgh International Cross Country; Edinburgh, United Kingdom | Cross country: long race | 1st | 21:35 | 3rd: Melkamu; 4th: Kidane; 7th: E. Dibaba; 11th: Lornah Kiplagat |
| 2005 | Jan Meda International Cross Country; Addis Ababa, Ethiopia | Cross country: long race | 1st | 26:46 | 2nd: Melkamu; 3rd: Bekele; 6th: Kidane |
| 2005 | Ethiopian Athletics Championships; Addis Ababa, Ethiopia | 5000 metres | 2nd | Time not reported | 1st: Gelete Burka 15:39.12; 3rd: Kidane; 4th: Melkamu |
| 2005 | Reebok Grand Prix; New York City | 5000 metres | 1st | 14:32.42 | 2nd: E. Dibaba; 3rd: Ejigu |
| 2006 | Great Edinburgh International Cross Country; Edinburgh, United Kingdom | Cross country: long race | 3rd | 19:21 | 1st: Burka; 6th: E. Dibaba; 13th: Sonia O'Sullivan |
| 2010 | Great Edinburgh International Cross Country; Edinburgh, United Kingdom | Cross country: long race | 1st | 21:37 | 2nd: Cheruiyot |
| 2016 | Guldendensporenmeeting; Kortrijk, Belgium | 5000 metres | 1st | 14:41.73 | None |

== Personal bests ==
=== Outdoor ===
As of 29 June 2017, Dibaba's outdoor personal bests are as follows:

| Event | Mark | Date | Meet & Location | Notes |
|---|---|---|---|---|
| 3000 metres (track) | 8:29.55 | 28 July 2006 | London Grand Prix; London, United Kingdom | |
| 3 kilometres (road) | 9:16 | 18 May 2014 | BUPA Great Manchester Run (10 kilometres); Manchester, England | Intermediate time in a longer race. |
| 5000 metres (track) | 14:11.15 | 6 June 2008 | Bislett Games; Oslo, Norway | Former World record. |
| 5 kilometres (road) | 14:51 | 3 April 2005 | Carlsbad 5000; Carlsbad, United States | -- |
| 10,000 metres (track) | 29:42.56 | 12 August 2016 | Olympics; Rio de Janeiro, Brazil | Seventh fastest of all time. |
| 10 kilometres (road) | 30:30 | 1 September 2013 | Tilburg Ten Miles; Tilburg, Netherlands | |
| 15 kilometres (road) | 46:28 | 15 November 2009 | Zevenheuvelenloop; Nijmegen, Netherlands | (1) Former world record. (2) Fourth fastest of all time. |
| 10 miles (road) | 51:49 | 23 October 2016 | Great South Run; Portsmouth, England | |
| 20 kilometres (road) | 1:03:25 | 10 February 2017 | Ras Al Khaimah Half Marathon; Ras al-Khaimah, United Arab Emirates | Intermediate time in a longer race. |
| Half marathon (road) | 1:06:50 | 10 February 2017 | Ras Al Khaimah Half Marathon; Ras al-Khaimah, United Arab Emirates | |
| Marathon (road) | 2:17:56 | 23 April 2017 | London Marathon; London, United Kingdom | (1) Twelfth fastest of all time. (2) Former Ethiopian record, broken 25 January 2019. |

=== Indoor ===
| Event | Mark | Date | Meeting | Location | Notes |
|---|---|---|---|---|---|
| 3000 metres | 8:33.37 | 26 January 2008 | Reebok Boston Indoor Games | Boston | |
| Two miles | 9:12.23 | 20 February 2010 | Aviva Grand Prix | Birmingham, U.K. | Fourth fastest of all time. |
| 5000 metres | 14:27.42 | 27 January 2007 | Reebok Boston Indoor Games | Boston | (1) Third fastest of all time. (2) Former world record. |

== Notes ==
Records
| Preceded by (Ethiopia) Meseret Defar | Women's 5000 m World Record Holder; 6 June 2008 – 7 October 2020 | Succeeded by (Ethiopia) Letesenbet Gidey |
Awards
| Preceded by (Ethiopia) Meseret Defar | Women's Track & Field Athlete of the Year; 2008 | Succeeded by (United States) Sanya Richards |
Sporting positions
| Preceded by (Ethiopia) Meseret Defar | Women's 5000 m Best Year Performance; 2008–2009 | Succeeded by (Kenya) Vivian Cheruiyot |
