= 2005 World Championships in Athletics – Women's 5000 metres =

The Women's 5,000 metres event at the 2005 World Championships was held on August 10 and August 13 at the Helsinki Olympic Stadium.

== Medalists ==
Gold	Tirunesh Dibaba; Ethiopia (ETH)
Silver	Meseret Defar; Ethiopia (ETH)
Bronze	Ejegayehu Dibaba; Ethiopia (ETH)

== Heats ==
=== Heat 1 ===
1. Tirunesh Dibaba, Ethiopia 14:50.98 Q
2. Meselech Melkamu, Ethiopia 14:51.49 Q
3. (United Kingdom) Joanne Pavey, Great Britain 14:53.82 Q
4. Prisca Jepleting Ngetich, Kenya 14:54.50 Q (SB)
5. Marta Domínguez, Spain 14:56.02 q
6. Volha Kravtsova, Belarus 14:56.16 q (NR)
7. Zakia Mrisho Mohamed, Tanzania 14:57.22 q (NR)
8. Sun Yingjie, China 14:58.34 q (SB)
9. Kayoko Fukushi, Japan 15:05.77 q
10. Lauren Fleshman, United States 15:32.05
11. Veerle Dejaeghere, Belgium 15:47.01
12. Maryna Dubrova, Ukraine 16:01.88
13. Anesie Kwizera, Burundi 16:06.66 (NR)
14. Catherine Chikwakwa, Malawi 16:11.63 (SB)
15. Jessica Augusto, Portugal 16:23.66

=== Heat 2 ===
1. Meseret Defar, Ethiopia 15:13.52 Q
2. Ejegayehu Dibaba, Ethiopia 15:14.33 Q
3. Xing Huina, China 15:14.48 Q (SB)
4. Liliya Shobukhova, Russia 15:14.63 Q
5. Isabella Ochichi, Kenya 15:16.51 q
6. Susanne Wigene, Norway 15:18.38 q
7. Shalane Flanagan, United States 15:20.59
8. Maria Protopappa, Greece 15:32.04
9. Amy Rudolph, United States 15:32.73
10. Margaret Maury, France 15:35.65
11. Dulce Maria Rodriguez, Mexico 15:44.65 (SB)
12. Anikó Kálovics, Hungary 15:46.36
13. Simret Sultan, Eritrea 15:47.46
14. (Republic of Ireland) Maria McCambridge, Ireland 16:05.44
15. Miriam Kaumba, Zambia 16:10.70

== Final ==
1. Tirunesh Dibaba, Ethiopia 14:38.59 (CR)
2. Meseret Defar, Ethiopia 14:39.54
3. Ejegayehu Dibaba, Ethiopia 14:42.47
4. Meselech Melkamu, Ethiopia 14:43.47
5. Xing Huina, China 14:43.64 (PB)
6. Zakia Mrisho Mohamed, Tanzania 14:43.87 (NR)
7. Prisca Jepleting Ngetich, Kenya 14:44.00 (PB)
8. Isabella Ochichi, Kenya 14:45.14 (PB)
9. Liliya Shobukhova, Russia 14:47.07 (PB)
10. Volha Kravtsova, Belarus 14:47.75 (NR)
11. Sun Yingjie, China 14:51.19 (SB)
12. Kayoko Fukushi, Japan 14:59.92
13. Susanne Wigene, Norway 15:00.23
14. Marta Domínguez, Spain 15:02.30
15. (United Kingdom) Joanne Pavey, Great Britain 15:14.37
