= Edith Masai =

Kenyan long-distance runner

Medal record

Women's athletics

Representing Kenya

World Championships
Bronze medal – third place	2003 Paris	5000 m

World Cross Country Championships
Gold medal – first place	2002 Dublin	Short race
Gold medal – first place	2003 Lausanne	Short race
Gold medal – first place	2004 Brussels	Short race
Bronze medal – third place	2001 Ostend	Short race

African Championships
Gold medal – first place	2006 Bambous	10,000 m

All-Africa Games
Silver medal – second place	2007 Algiers	10,000 m

Edith Chewanjel Masai (born 4 April 1967) is a Kenyan former long-distance runner who specialised in cross country and track races, then road races in her late career. She represented Kenya at the 2004 Summer Olympics. Her best achievements are three individual gold medals in the short race at the IAAF World Cross Country Championships between 2002 and 2004.

She is also known for reaching global top at the age of 35. On the track she was the bronze medallist over 5000 metres at the 2003 World Championships in Athletics and was the 2006 African Champion over 10,000 metres. She has also won silver medals over 10,000 m at the 2007 All-Africa Games and 5000 m at the 2002 Commonwealth Games.

Her track best of 8:23.23 minutes for the 3000 metres, set in 2002, remains the African record for the event. Over the marathon distance, she ran her career best of 2:27:06 hours to win the 2005 Hamburg Marathon.

== Career ==
=== Early life ===
Masai was born in Chepkoya village, Mount Elgon District. She is the third born from a family of four. She competed during her high school days while at Kibuk Secondary School. She graduated in 1988. She joined Kenya Prisons Service in 1990, known for recruiting many talented athletes. Masai did not, however, achieve anything until 1999, when she became the national cross-country champion, at the age of 32. Consequently, she started training more seriously. She won the Lotto Cross Cup Brussels in 2001 and went on to take bronze in the short race at the World Cross Country Championships that year. She improved upon this the following year, taking the gold at the 2002 IAAF World Cross Country Championships.

=== International career ===
Masai holds the 3000 metres African record set in July 2002 in Monaco

She won a bronze medal at the 2003 World Championships. In 2004, she failed at the Kenyan trials for the Olympics, but since she was one of only three Kenyans who had beaten the Olympic "A"-qualifying time in women's 5000 metres that year, she was offered a place on the team. Masai herself initially rejected the offer, but joined the team after lengthy negotiations. At the Olympics she dropped out after suffering a hamstring injury. She made her marathon debut at the age of 38, but gave a confident first performance, clocking 2:27:06 to win the 2005 Hamburg Marathon.

She finished fifth at the 10,000 metres race at the 2005 World Championships in Helsinki, Finland. Her time, 30:30.26 was a new Kenyan record. The record was beaten by Linet Masai at the 2008 Olympics, who run 30:26.50.

Masai has since been shifting from track running to marathon. She won Hamburg Marathon in 2005 and participated it also in 2006 and 2007. In 2006, she won Berlin Half Marathon, setting the fastest half marathon run that year, 1:07:16 minutes. It was also a personal best and a course record. She also set a new 5000 metres Kenyan record of 14:33.84 minutes.

She won 10,000 metres silver medal at the 2007 All-Africa Games. Her time, 31:31.18 is a new World record for women over 40 years old. The previous record was held by Nicole Lévêque of France, who run 32:12.07 in Helsinki in 1994. Masai participated the 2008 World championships marathon in Osaka, Japan, finishing 8th in a race won by her compatriot Catherine Ndereba.

Masai won the 2008 Virginia Beach Rock 'n' Roll Half Marathon. She won Singapore Marathon in December 2008. she broke up with her agent Dorothee Paulmann. in 2007 and worked independently.

She currently lives in Ngong and Kitale. She coaches the Kenya Prisons Cross Country team. She is a divorced mother of one, her son Paul Griffin Sakit born in 1992 who ran for Louisiana Tech University. Masai retired from competitive running in early 2010 because of a knee injury.

== Major competition record ==
Year	Competition	Venue	Position	Event	Notes
2001	World XC Championships	Ostend, Belgium	3rd	Short race	
2001	World XC Championships	Ostend, Belgium	2nd	Team short race	
2001	World Championships	Edmonton, Canada	7th	5000 m	15:17.67
2001	Grand Prix Final	Melbourne, Australia	7th	3000 m	
2002	World XC Championships	Dublin, Ireland	1st	Short race	
2002	World XC Championships	Dublin, Ireland	2nd	Team short race	
2002	Commonwealth Games	Manchester, England	2nd	5000 m	
2002	Grand Prix Final	Paris, France	4th	3000 m	
2003	World XC Championships	Lausanne, Switzerland	1st	Short race	
2003	World XC Championships	Lausanne, Switzerland	1st	Team short race	
2003	World Championships	Paris, France	3rd	5000 m	14:52.30
2003	World Athletics Final	Monaco	1st	3000 m	
2004	World XC Championships	Brussels, Belgium	1st	Short race	
2004	World XC Championships	Brussels, Belgium	2nd	Team short race	
2004	World Athletics Final	Monaco	4th	5000 m	
2005	World Championships	Helsinki, Finland	5th	10,000 m	
2005	World Athletics Final	Monaco	6th	3000 m	
2006	African Championships	Bambous, Mauritius	1st	10,000 m	
2006	World Road Running Championships	Debrecen, Hungary	5th		
2006	World Road Running Championships	Debrecen, Hungary	1st	Team race	
2006	World Athletics Final	Stuttgart, Germany	7th	5000 m	
2007	All-Africa Games	Algiers, Algeria	2nd	10,000 m	
2007	World Championships	Osaka, Japan	8th	Marathon	

== Personal Best ==
Distance	Time	City	Date
3000 metres	8:23.23	Monaco	19 July 2002
5000 metres	14:33.84	Oslo	2 June 2006
10,000 metres	30:30.26	Helsinki	6 August 2005
10 kilometres	31:13	La Courneuve	31 March 2002
15 kilometres	47:52	Berlin	2 April 2006
20 kilometres	1:03:52	Berlin	2 April 2006
Half marathon	1:07:16	Berlin	2 April 2006
30 kilometres	1:42:15	Hamburg	23 April 2006
Marathon	2:27:06	Hamburg	24 April 2005
5 kilometres	14:50	Neuss	8 June 2002
10 miles road	52:45	Zaandam	22 September 2002
