= Lucia Chandamale =

Malawian athlete (born 1988)

Personal information
- Nationality: Malawi
- Born: 18 June 1988 (age 38) Lilongwe, Malawi
- Height: 1.65 m (5 ft 5 in)
- Weight: 48 kg (106 lb)

Sport
- Sport: Athletics
- Event: Long-distance running
Medal record
Women's athletics
Representing Malawi
African Southern Region Championships
Bronze medal – third place	2007 Windhoek	5000 m

Lucia Chandamale (born June 18, 1988, in Lilongwe) is a Malawian athlete, who specialized in long-distance running. She represented Malawi at the 2008 Summer Olympics in Beijing, and competed for the women's 5,000 metres. She ran in the first heat of the event, against sixteen other competitors, including Ethiopia's Tirunesh Dibaba, who won the gold medal in the final round. Chandamale finished and completed the race in fifteenth place, with a time of 16:44.09, nearly nine seconds slower than her personal best of 16:35.75.

== Career ==
In October 2004 she was in Harare in Zimbabwe and she won the half marathon event at the age of sixteen with a time just over 1 hour 15 minutes beating local runner Chiedza Chokore and her sister.

Chandamale won a bronze medal in the 5000 m at the 2007 African Southern Region Athletics Championships in Windhoek, Namibia. She was a celebrated athlete in Malawi, maintaining a winning streak at events like the Malawi Defence Force Inter Unit Sports Festival.

Chandamale also reached the final in the same category for a tenth-place finish at the 2006 Commonwealth Games in Melbourne, Australia, with a time of 17:10.46.
