= Volha Krautsova =

Belarusian long-distance runner

Volha Krautsova (Belarusian: Вольга Краўцова; born 25 June 1981) is a Belarusian long-distance runner who specializes in the 5000 metres.

== Achievements ==
Year	Competition	Venue	Position	Event	Notes
Representing Belarus
2003	European U23 Championships	Bydgoszcz, Poland	—	5000m	DNF
2005	World Championships	Helsinki, Finland	10th	5000 m	14:47.75
2006	European Championships	Gothenburg, Sweden	5th	5000 m	15:06.47

=== Personal bests ===
- 1500 metres - 4:05.76 min (2005)
- 3000 metres - 9:02.9 min (2007)
- 5000 metres - 14:47.75 min (2005)
- 10,000 metres - 31:58.52 min (2007)
