= 2006 IAAF World Cross Country Championships – Senior men's race =

Senior men's race at the 2006 IAAF World Cross Country Championships
- Organisers: IAAF
- Edition: 34th
- Date: April 2
- Host city: Fukuoka, Kyushu, Japan
- Venue: Umi-no-nakamichi Seaside Park
- Events: 1
- Distances: 12 km – Senior men
- Participation: 140 athletes from 40 nations

The Senior men's race at the 2006 IAAF World Cross Country Championships was held at the Umi-no-nakamichi Seaside Park in Fukuoka, Japan, on April 2, 2006. Reports of the event were given in The New York Times, and for the IAAF.

Complete results for individuals, for teams, medallists, and the results of British athletes who took part were published.

== Race results ==
=== Senior men's race (12 km) ===
==== Individual ====
Rank	Athlete	Country	Time
1st place, gold medalist(s)	Kenenisa Bekele	Ethiopia	35:40
2nd place, silver medalist(s)	Sileshi Sihine	Ethiopia	35:43
3rd place, bronze medalist(s)	Martin Mathathi	Kenya	35:44
4	Zersenay Tadesse	Eritrea	35:47
5	Mike Kigen	Kenya	35:54
6	Hosea Macharinyang	Kenya	36:02
7	Yonas Kifle	Eritrea	36:05
8	Ali Abdalla	Eritrea	36:18
9	Tesfayohannes Mesfen	Eritrea	36:18
10	Simon Arusei	Kenya	36:18
11	Abderrahim Goumri	Morocco	36:20
12	John Kibowen	Kenya	36:21
13	Gebre-egziabher Gebremariam	Ethiopia	36:24
14	Abdullah Ahmed Hassan	Qatar	36:25
15	Mohamed Amyn	Morocco	36:28
16	Khalid El Amri	Morocco	36:31
17	Juan Carlos de la Ossa	Spain	36:35
18	Jamal Bilal Salem	Qatar	36:40
19	Samson Kiflemariam	Eritrea	36:41
20	Aïssa Dghoughi	Morocco	36:42
21	Wilson Busienei	Uganda	36:42
22	Boniface Kiprop	Uganda	36:45
23	Moses Kipsiro	Uganda	36:52
24	Khalid Zoubaa	France	36:54
25	Fernando Silva	Portugal	36:57
26	Ketema Nigusse	Ethiopia	36:58
27	Eduardo Henriques	Portugal	37:04
28	Alejandro Suárez	Mexico	37:05
29	Carles Castillejo	Spain	37:06
30	Teodoro Vega	Mexico	37:06
31	Eshetu Gezhagne	Ethiopia	37:07
32	Mubarak Hassan Shami	Qatar	37:09
33	Gabriele De Nard	Italy	37:17
34	Brahim Beloua	Morocco	37:18
35	Kazuyoshi Tokumoto	Japan	37:20
36	Isaac Kiprop	Uganda	37:21
37	Samir Moussaoui	Algeria	37:22
38	Ahmed Naïli	Algeria	37:24
39	Tomoyuki Sato	Japan	37:26
40	Dieudonné Disi	Rwanda	37:27
41	David Galván	Mexico	37:28
42	Gian Marco Buttazzo	Italy	37:28
43	Ryan Hall	United States	37:29
44	Moses Aliwa	Uganda	37:35
45	Martin Dent	Australia	37:36
46	Samuel Kosgei	Uganda	37:37
47	Ricardo Ribas	Portugal	37:40
48	Terukazu Omori	Japan	37:40
49	Kensuke Takezawa	Japan	37:43
50	Ahmed Baday	Morocco	37:43
51	Patrick Gildea	United States	37:45
52	Moustafa Ahmed Shebto	Qatar	37:48
53	Alfredo Bráz	Portugal	37:50
54	Brett Cartwright	Australia	37:52
55	Brandon Leslie	United States	37:58
56	Vinny Mulvey	Ireland	37:58
57	Max King	United States	38:03
58	Simion Tuitoek	Kenya	38:04
59	Saïd Belaout	Algeria	38:06
60	Giovanni Gualdi	Italy	38:09
61	Han Gang	China	38:11
62	Nicholas Kemboi	Qatar	38:14
63	Masato Imai	Japan	38:15
64	Manuel Silva	Portugal	38:17
65	Ricardo Serrano	Spain	38:17
66	Abdelhakim Maazouz	Algeria	38:17
67	Hideaki Date	Japan	38:17
68	Stefano Scaini	Italy	38:18
69	James Theuri	France	38:18
70	Fabio Cesari	Italy	38:19
71	Abebe Dinkessa	Ethiopia	38:19
72	Jean Baptiste Simukeka	Rwanda	38:22
73	Sergio da Silva	Brazil	38:22
74	Jason Hartmann	United States	38:23
75	Rachid Safari	Rwanda	38:25
76	Ryan McKenzie	Canada	38:29
77	Gavin Thompson	United Kingdom	38:31
78	Norman Dlomo	South Africa	38:34
79	Jeffrey Gwebu	South Africa	38:34
80	Dominic Bannister	United Kingdom	38:35
81	Benedito Gomes	Brazil	38:40
82	Jonathan Monje	Chile	38:41
83	Frank Tickner	United Kingdom	38:42
84	Gabalebe Moloko	Botswana	38:44
85	Valens Bivahagumye	Rwanda	38:45
86	Sylvain Rukundo	Rwanda	38:49
87	Kaelo Mosalagae	Botswana	38:49
88	Roberto Echeverría	Chile	38:51
89	Nabil Benkrama	Algeria	38:54
90	Ma Jifu	China	38:54
91	Omid Mehrabi	Iran	38:59
92	Steve Osadiuk	Canada	39:01
93	Alfredo Arévalo	Guatemala	39:10
94	Su Wei	China	39:11
95	Cristiano Mauricio	Canada	39:12
96	Boiphemelo Selagaboy	Botswana	39:19
97	Shin Younggun	South Korea	39:19
98	Javier Guarin	Colombia	39:25
99	Jeff Scull	Canada	39:25
100	Cesar Javier Jiménez	Mexico	39:27
101	Ndabili Bashingili	Botswana	39:31
102	Claudir Rodrigues	Brazil	39:31
103	Chen Mingfu	China	39:32
104	José Amado García	Guatemala	39:35
105	Lee Du-Haeng	South Korea	39:35
106	Takhir Mamashayev	Kazakhstan	39:48
107	Li Zhuhong	China	39:53
108	Enzo Yañez	Chile	40:08
109	Li Youcai	China	40:08
110	Abd Al-Rasool Ahmed	Egypt	40:14
111	Bae Sungmin	South Korea	40:14
112	Russell Dessaix-Chin	Australia	40:17
113	Víctor Hernández	Guatemala	40:18
114	Ajit Bandara	Sri Lanka	40:24
115	Mohamed El Gayar	Egypt	40:31
116	Tom Humphries	United Kingdom	40:33
117	Ruslan Nasyrov	Uzbekistan	40:41
118	Sergio Lobos	Chile	40:45
119	Michael Tomlin	Jamaica	40:51
120	Simon Labiche	Seychelles	40:56
121	David Ruschena	Australia	41:05
122	Yasser Moustafa	Egypt	41:07
123	Carlos Cangengele	Angola	41:15
124	Jauhari Johan	Indonesia	41:16
125	James Nielsen	Canada	41:31
126	Ahmed Bakry	Egypt	41:32
127	Irappa Dundappa Akki	India	43:01
128	Nozimjon Irmatov	Tajikistan	43:34
129	Jesús Ramírez	Dominican Republic	43:59
130	Phillip Edward	Jamaica	44:20
131	Konan Severin N'dri	Côte d'Ivoire	44:28
132	Kevin Campbell	Jamaica	45:18
—	Delfim Conceição	Portugal	DNF
—	Luciano Di Pardo	Italy	DNF
—	Ben Noad	United Kingdom	DNF
—	Merzak Ouldbouchiba	Algeria	DNF
—	Matt Gabrielson	United States	DNF
—	Heo Jang-Kyu	South Korea	DNF
—	José Eloy	Brazil	DNF
—	Hurley Stewart	Jamaica	DNF
—	Craig Mottram	Australia	DNS
—	Wainard Talbert	Jamaica	DNS
—	Juan Luis Barrios	Mexico	DNS
—	Saif Saaeed Shaheen	Qatar	DNS

==== Teams ====
Rank	Team	Points
1st place, gold medalist(s)	Kenya: Martin Mathathi / 3; Mike Kigen / 5; Hosea Macharinyang / 6; Simon Arusei / 10; (John Kibowen) / (12); (Simion Tuitoek) / (58)	24
2nd place, silver medalist(s)	Eritrea: Zersenay Tadesse / 4; Yonas Kifle / 7; Ali Abdalla / 8; Tesfayohannes Mesfen / 9; (Samson Kiflemariam) / (19)	28
3rd place, bronze medalist(s)	Ethiopia: Kenenisa Bekele / 1; Sileshi Sihine / 2; Gebre-egziabher Gebremariam / 13; Ketema Nigusse / 26; (Eshetu Gezhagne) / (31); (Abebe Dinkessa) / (71)	42
4	Morocco: Abderrahim Goumri / 11; Mohamed Amyn / 15; Khalid El Amri / 16; Aïssa Dghoughi / 20; (Brahim Beloua) / (34); (Ahmed Baday) / (50)	62
5	Uganda: Wilson Busienei / 21; Boniface Kiprop / 22; Moses Kipsiro / 23; Isaac Kiprop / 36; (Moses Aliwa) / (44); (Samuel Kosgei) / (46)	102
6	Qatar: Abdullah Ahmed Hassan / 14; Jamal Bilal Salem / 18; Mubarak Hassan Shami / 32; Moustafa Ahmed Shebto / 52; (Nicholas Kemboi) / (62)	116
7	Portugal: Fernando Silva / 25; Eduardo Henriques / 27; Ricardo Ribas / 47; Alfredo Bráz / 53; (Manuel Silva) / (64); (Delfim Conceição) / (DNF)	152
8	Japan: Kazuyoshi Tokumoto / 35; Tomoyuki Sato / 39; Terukazu Omori / 48; Kensuke Takezawa / 49; (Masato Imai) / (63); (Hideaki Date) / (67)	171
9	Mexico: Alejandro Suárez / 28; Teodoro Vega / 30; David Galván / 41; Cesar Javier Jiménez / 100	199
10	Algeria: Samir Moussaoui / 37; Ahmed Naïli / 38; Saïd Belaout / 59; Abdelhakim Maazouz / 66; (Nabil Benkrama) / (89); (Merzak Ouldbouchiba) / (DNF)	200
11	Italy: Gabriele De Nard / 33; Gian Marco Buttazzo / 42; Giovanni Gualdi / 60; Stefano Scaini / 68; (Fabio Cesari) / (70); (Luciano Di Pardo) / (DNF)	203
12	United States: Ryan Hall / 43; Patrick Gildea / 51; Brandon Leslie / 55; Max King / 57; (Jason Hartmann) / (74); (Matt Gabrielson) / (DNF)	206
13	Rwanda: Dieudonné Disi / 40; Jean Baptiste Simukeka / 72; Rachid Safari / 75; Valens Bivahagumye / 85; (Sylvain Rukundo) / (86)	272
14	Australia: Martin Dent / 45; Brett Cartwright / 54; Russell Dessaix-Chin / 112; David Ruschena / 121	332
15	China: Han Gang / 61; Ma Jifu / 90; Su Wei / 94; Chen Mingfu / 103; (Li Zhuhong) / (107); (Li Youcai) / (109)	348
16	United Kingdom: Gavin Thompson / 77; Dominic Bannister / 80; Frank Tickner / 83; Tom Humphries / 116; (Ben Noad) / (DNF)	356
17	Canada: Ryan McKenzie / 76; Steve Osadiuk / 92; Cristiano Mauricio / 95; Jeff Scull / 99; (James Nielsen) / (125)	362
18	Botswana: Gabalebe Moloko / 84; Kaelo Mosalagae / 87; Boiphemelo Selagaboy / 96; Ndabili Bashingili / 101	368
19	Chile: Jonathan Monje / 82; Roberto Echeverria / 88; Enzo Yañez / 108; Sergio Lobos / 118	396
20	Egypt: Abd Al-Rasool Ahmed / 110; Mohamed El Gayar / 115; Yasser Moustafa / 122; Ahmed Bakry / 126	473
DNF	Brazil: (Sergio da Silva) / (73); (Benedito Gomes) / (81); (Claudir Rodrigues) / (102); (José Eloy) / (DNF)	DNF
DNF	South Korea: (Shin Younggun) / (97); (Lee Du-Haeng) / (105); (Bae Sungmin) / (111); (Heo Jang-Kyu) / (DNF)	DNF
DNF	Jamaica: (Michael Tomlin) / (119); (Phillip Edward) / (130); (Kevin Campbell) / (132); (Hurley Stewart) / (DNF)	DNF

- Note: Athletes in parentheses did not score for the team result.

== Participation ==
According to an unofficial count, 140 athletes from 40 countries participated in the Senior men's race.

- Algeria (6)
- Angola (1)
- Australia (4)
- Botswana (4)
- Brazil (4)
- Canada (5)
- Chile (4)
- China (6)
- Colombia (1)
- Côte d'Ivoire (1)
- Dominican Republic (1)
- Egypt (4)
- Eritrea (5)
- Ethiopia (6)
- France (2)
- Guatemala (3)
- India (1)
- Indonesia (1)
- Iran (1)
- Ireland (1)
- Italy (6)
- Jamaica (4)
- Japan (6)
- Kazakhstan (1)
- Kenya (6)
- Mexico (4)
- Morocco (6)
- Portugal (6)
- Qatar (5)
- Rwanda (5)
- Seychelles (1)
- South Africa (2)
- South Korea (4)
- Spain (3)
- Sri Lanka (1)
- Tajikistan (1)
- Uganda (6)
- United Kingdom (5)
- United States (6)
- Uzbekistan (1)

== See also ==
- 2006 IAAF World Cross Country Championships – Men's short race
- 2006 IAAF World Cross Country Championships – Junior men's race
- 2006 IAAF World Cross Country Championships – Senior women's race
- 2006 IAAF World Cross Country Championships – Women's short race
- 2006 IAAF World Cross Country Championships – Junior women's race
