= 2006 IAAF World Cross Country Championships – Men's short race =

Men's short race at the 2006 IAAF World Cross Country Championships
- Organisers: IAAF
- Edition: 34th
- Date: April 1
- Host city: Fukuoka, Kyushu, Japan
- Venue: Umi-no-nakamichi Seaside Park
- Events: 1
- Distances: 4 km – Men's short
- Participation: 128 athletes from 34 nations

The Men's short race at the 2006 IAAF World Cross Country Championships was held at the Umi-no-nakamichi Seaside Park in Fukuoka, Japan, on April 1, 2006. Reports of the event were given in The New York Times, and for the IAAF.

Complete results for individuals, for teams, medallists, and the results of British athletes who took part were published.

== Race results ==
=== Men's short race (4 km) ===
==== Individual ====
Rank	Athlete	Country	Time
1st place, gold medalist(s)	Kenenisa Bekele	Ethiopia	10:54
2nd place, silver medalist(s)	Isaac Songok	Kenya	10:55
3rd place, bronze medalist(s)	Adil Kaouch	Morocco	10:57
4	Benjamin Limo	Kenya	11:00
5	Ali Abdosh	Ethiopia	11:01
6	Adam Goucher	United States	11:02
7	Augustine Choge	Kenya	11:03
8	Edwin Cheruiyot Soi	Kenya	11:06
9	Saif Saeed Shaheen	Qatar	11:08
10	Sultan Khamis Zaman	Qatar	11:08
11	Craig Mottram	Australia	11:10
12	Sileshi Sihine	Ethiopia	11:12
13	Kevin Sullivan	Canada	11:14
14	Hicham Bellani	Morocco	11:15
15	Khalid El Amri	Morocco	11:16
16	Khoudir Aggoune	Algeria	11:17
17	Wilson Busienei	Uganda	11:17
18	Brimin Kipruto	Kenya	11:17
19	Ryan Hall	United States	11:18
20	Yusuf Kibet Biwot	Kenya	11:18
21	Hamid Ezzine	Morocco	11:19
22	Alejandro Suárez	Mexico	11:19
23	Jamal Bilal Salem	Qatar	11:20
24	Musa Amer Obaid	Qatar	11:20
25	Habtai Kifletsion	Eritrea	11:21
26	Amanuel Waldeselassie	Eritrea	11:21
27	Jorge Torres	United States	11:21
28	Daniel Lincoln	United States	11:21
29	Moses Kipsiro	Uganda	11:22
30	Gebre-egziabher Gebremariam	Ethiopia	11:22
31	Juan Carlos Higuero	Spain	11:24
32	Sébastien Cosson	France	11:24
33	Ian Dobson	United States	11:25
34	José Luis Blanco	Spain	11:25
35	Essa Ismail Rashed	Qatar	11:25
36	Tarek Boukensa	Algeria	11:25
37	Carlos García	Spain	11:26
38	Mariano Villarubia	Spain	11:26
39	Abebe Dinkessa	Ethiopia	11:26
40	Mo Farah	United Kingdom	11:27
41	David Galván	Mexico	11:28
42	Martin Dent	Australia	11:28
43	James Kwalia	Qatar	11:29
44	Roberto García	Spain	11:30
45	Teodoro Vega	Mexico	11:30
46	Simon Ayeko	Uganda	11:30
47	Anis Selmouni	Morocco	11:30
48	Zenbaba Yegezu	Ethiopia	11:30
49	Loïc Letellier	France	11:30
50	Benjamin Kiplagat	Uganda	11:31
51	Manuel Damião	Portugal	11:31
52	Rabah Aboud	Algeria	11:32
53	Hais Welday	Eritrea	11:33
54	Ali Saïdi-Sief	Algeria	11:34
55	Gabriele De Nard	Italy	11:34
56	Mark Wharmby	United Kingdom	11:34
57	Luke Watson	United States	11:35
58	Jeremy Roff	Australia	11:35
59	Gian Marco Buttazzo	Italy	11:36
60	Kazuhiro Maeda	Japan	11:36
61	Ryan McKenzie	Canada	11:37
62	Juan Barrios	Mexico	11:37
63	Moussa Barkaoui	France	11:38
64	Ben Siwa	Uganda	11:39
65	Hassan Oubassour	France	11:44
66	Han Gang	China	11:44
67	Makoto Tobimatsu	Japan	11:45
68	Angus MacLean	United Kingdom	11:46
69	Tefai Felfele Yohannes	Eritrea	11:46
70	Luciano Di Pardo	Italy	11:47
71	Sello Mahase	South Africa	11:48
72	Philipp Bandi	Switzerland	11:49
73	Eric Gillis	Canada	11:49
74	Giovanni Gualdi	Italy	11:50
75	Antar Zerguelaïne	Algeria	11:50
76	Badre din Zioini	France	11:50
77	Stefano Scaini	Italy	11:50
78	Michal Kaczmarek	Poland	11:51
79	Hudson de Souza	Brazil	11:52
80	Jonathan Monje	Chile	11:53
81	Nourreddine Bourfaa	Algeria	11:54
82	Denis Bagrev	Kyrgyzstan	11:56
83	Kazuki Ikenaga	Japan	11:56
84	Roberto Echeverría	Chile	11:57
85	Rui Silva	Portugal	11:58
86	Koichiro Nagata	Japan	11:58
87	David Byrne	Australia	11:59
88	Cristiano Mauricio	Canada	12:00
89	Steven Vernon	United Kingdom	12:02
90	Marcin Lewandowski	Poland	12:03
91	Ma Jifu	China	12:04
92	Stephanus Steenkamp	South Africa	12:04
93	Alastair Stevenson	Australia	12:04
94	Mandla Maseko	South Africa	12:06
95	Fabio Cesari	Italy	12:06
96	Sergio Lobos	Chile	12:06
97	Chen Mingfu	China	12:07
98	Reid Coolsaet	Canada	12:07
99	Modike Lucky Mohale	South Africa	12:07
100	Pule Hlabahlaba	South Africa	12:08
101	Li Youcai	China	12:09
102	Su Wei	China	12:12
103	Li Zhuhong	China	12:13
104	Kamil Murzyn	Poland	12:14
105	Chris Davies	United Kingdom	12:15
106	Yoshitaka Iwamizu	Japan	12:17
107	Artem Kossinov	Kazakhstan	12:20
108	Vincent Kuotane	South Africa	12:23
109	Ajmal Amirov	Tajikistan	12:27
110	Michael Tomlin	Jamaica	12:27
111	Marat Nizamov	Uzbekistan	12:28
112	Yuichiro Ueno	Japan	12:32
113	Enzo Yañez	Chile	12:35
114	Amir Garifullin	Uzbekistan	12:36
115	Marcin Urbanowski	Poland	12:39
116	Taylor Milne	Canada	12:47
117	Denides Vélez	Puerto Rico	12:50
118	Alain Kra Kouadio	Côte d'Ivoire	12:50
119	Kevin Campbell	Jamaica	12:51
120	Kirk Brown	Jamaica	12:52
121	Kashinath T. Aswale	India	12:54
122	Noce Matital	Indonesia	12:55
123	Wainard Talbert	Jamaica	12:58
124	Hurley Stewart	Jamaica	13:04
125	Juan Almonte	Dominican Republic	13:05
126	Phillip Edward	Jamaica	13:19
—	Alibay Shukurov	Azerbaijan	DNF
—	Alexander Greaux	Puerto Rico	DNF
—	Buenaventura Yanez	Equatorial Guinea	DNS
—	Andrew Baddeley	United Kingdom	DNS

==== Teams ====
Rank	Team	Points
1st place, gold medalist(s)	Kenya: Isaac Songok / 2; Benjamin Limo / 4; Augustine Choge / 7; Edwin Cheruiyot Soi / 8; (Brimin Kipruto) / (18); (Yusuf Kibet Biwot) / (20)	21
2nd place, silver medalist(s)	Ethiopia: Kenenisa Bekele / 1; Ali Abdosh / 5; Sileshi Sihine / 12; Gebre-egziabher Gebremariam / 30; (Abebe Dinkessa) / (39); (Zenbaba Yegezu) / (48)	48
3rd place, bronze medalist(s)	Morocco: Adil Kaouch / 3; Hicham Bellani / 14; Khalid El Amri / 15; Hamid Ezzine / 21; (Anis Selmouni) / (47)	53
4	Qatar: Saif Saeed Shaheen / 9; Sultan Khamis Zaman / 10; Jamal Bilal Salem / 23; Musa Amer Obaid / 24; (Essa Ismail Rashed) / (35); (James Kwalia) / (43)	66
5	United States: Adam Goucher / 6; Ryan Hall / 19; Jorge Torres / 27; Daniel Lincoln / 28; (Ian Dobson) / (33); (Luke Watson) / (57)	80
6	Spain: Juan Carlos Higuero / 31; José Luis Blanco / 34; Carlos García / 37; Mariano Villarubia / 38; (Roberto García) / (44)	140
7	Uganda: Wilson Busienei / 17; Moses Kipsiro / 29; Simon Ayeko / 46; Benjamin Kiplagat / 50; (Ben Siwa) / (64)	142
8	Algeria: Khoudir Aggoune / 16; Tarek Boukensa / 36; Rabah Aboud / 52; Ali Saïdi-Sief / 54; (Antar Zerguelaïne) / (75); (Nourreddine Bourfaa) / (81)	158
9	Mexico: Alejandro Suárez / 22; David Galván / 41; Teodoro Vega / 45; Juan Barrios / 62	170
10	Eritrea: Habtai Kifletsion / 25; Amanuel Waldeselassie / 26; Hais Welday / 53; Tefai Felfele Yohannes / 69	173
11	Australia: Craig Mottram / 11; Martin Dent / 42; Jeremy Roff / 58; David Byrne / 87; (Alastair Stevenson) / (93)	198
12	France: Sébastien Cosson / 32; Loïc Letellier / 49; Moussa Barkaoui / 63; Hassan Oubassour / 65; (Badre din Zioini) / (76)	209
13	Canada: Kevin Sullivan / 13; Ryan McKenzie / 61; Eric Gillis / 73; Cristiano Mauricio / 88; (Reid Coolsaet) / (98); (Taylor Milne) / (116)	235
14	United Kingdom: Mo Farah / 40; Mark Wharmby / 56; Angus MacLean / 68; Steven Vernon / 89; (Chris Davies) / (105)	253
15	Italy: Gabriele De Nard / 55; Gian Marco Buttazzo / 59; Luciano Di Pardo / 70; Giovanni Gualdi / 74; (Stefano Scaini) / (77); (Fabio Cesari) / (95)	258
16	Japan: Kazuhiro Maeda / 60; Makoto Tobimatsu / 67; Kazuki Ikenaga / 83; Koichiro Nagata / 86; (Yoshitaka Iwamizu) / (106); (Yuichiro Ueno) / (112)	296
17	China: Han Gang / 66; Ma Jifu / 91; Chen Mingfu / 97; Li Youcai / 101; (Su Wei) / (102); (Li Zhuhong) / (103)	355
18	South Africa: Sello Mahase / 71; Stephanus Steenkamp / 92; Mandla Maseko / 94; Modike Lucky Mohale / 99; (Pule Hlabahlaba) / (100); (Vincent Kuotane) / (108)	356
19	Chile: Jonathan Monje / 80; Roberto Echeverria / 84; Sergio Lobos / 96; Enzo Yañez / 113	373
20	Poland: Michal Kaczmarek / 78; Marcin Lewandowski / 90; Kamil Murzyn / 104; Marcin Urbanowski / 115	387
21	Jamaica: Michael Tomlin / 110; Kevin Campbell / 119; Kirk Brown / 120; Wainard Talbert / 123; (Hurley Stewart) / (124); (Phillip Edward) / (126)	472

- Note: Athletes in parentheses did not score for the team result.

== Participation ==
According to an unofficial count, 128 athletes from 34 countries participated in the Men's short race. The announced athlete from Equatorial Guinea did not show.

- Algeria (6)
- Australia (5)
- Azerbaijan (1)
- Brazil (1)
- Canada (6)
- Chile (4)
- China (6)
- Côte d'Ivoire (1)
- Dominican Republic (1)
- Eritrea (4)
- Ethiopia (6)
- France (5)
- India (1)
- Indonesia (1)
- Italy (6)
- Jamaica (6)
- Japan (6)
- Kazakhstan (1)
- Kenya (6)
- Kyrgyzstan (1)
- Mexico (4)
- Morocco (5)
- Poland (4)
- Portugal (2)
- Puerto Rico (2)
- Qatar (6)
- South Africa (6)
- Spain (5)
- Switzerland (1)
- Tajikistan (1)
- Uganda (5)
- United Kingdom (5)
- United States (6)
- Uzbekistan (2)

== See also ==
- 2006 IAAF World Cross Country Championships – Senior men's race
- 2006 IAAF World Cross Country Championships – Junior men's race
- 2006 IAAF World Cross Country Championships – Senior women's race
- 2006 IAAF World Cross Country Championships – Women's short race
- 2006 IAAF World Cross Country Championships – Junior women's race
