= 2006 IAAF World Cross Country Championships – Senior women's race =

Cross country race

Senior women's race at the 2006 IAAF World Cross Country Championships
- Organisers: IAAF
- Edition: 34th
- Date: April 1
- Host city: Fukuoka, Kyushu, Japan
- Venue: Umi-no-nakamichi Seaside Park
- Events: 1
- Distances: 8 km – Senior women
- Participation: 99 athletes from 32 nations

The Senior women's race at the 2006 IAAF World Cross Country Championships was held at the Umi-no-nakamichi Seaside Park in Fukuoka, Japan, on April 1, 2006. Reports of the event were given in The New York Times, and for the IAAF.

Complete results for individuals, for teams, medallists, and the results of British athletes who took part were published.

== Race results ==
=== Senior women's race (8 km) ===
==== Individual ====
Rank	Athlete	Country	Time
1st place, gold medalist(s)	Tirunesh Dibaba	Ethiopia	25:21
2nd place, silver medalist(s)	Lornah Kiplagat	Netherlands	25:26
3rd place, bronze medalist(s)	Meselech Melkamu	Ethiopia	25:38
4	Benita Johnson	Australia	25:43
5	Wude Ayalew	Ethiopia	25:47
6	Kayoko Fukushi	Japan	25:51
7	Mestawat Tufa	Ethiopia	25:59
8	Evelyne Wambui	Kenya	26:11
9	Faith Jemutai	Kenya	26:12
10	Alice Chelangat	Kenya	26:13
11	Blake Russell	United States	26:23
12	Mercy Njoroge	Kenya	26:26
13	Edna Kiplagat	Kenya	26:32
14	Ejagayehu Dibaba	Ethiopia	26:37
15	Nina Rillstone	New Zealand	26:39
16	Kate McIlroy	New Zealand	26:42
17	Simret Sultan	Eritrea	26:43
18	Bao Guiying	China	26:43
19	Yoshimi Ozaki	Japan	26:45
20	Christine Bardelle	France	26:45
21	Katie McGregor	United States	26:46
22	Eloise Wellings	Australia	26:46
23	Mara Yamauchi	United Kingdom	26:47
24	Jessica Ruthe	New Zealand	26:47
25	Megumi Oshima	Japan	26:51
26	Sara Slattery	United States	26:51
27	Anna Thompson	Australia	26:54
28	Ruhama Shauri	Tanzania	26:54
29	Julie Coulaud	France	26:59
30	Yumi Sato	Japan	27:00
31	María Elena Valencia	Mexico	27:04
32	Kathy Butler	United Kingdom	27:06
33	Colleen de Reuck	United States	27:07
34	Victoria Mitchell	Australia	27:12
35	Pascalina Bombo	Tanzania	27:12
36	Rosa Morató	Spain	27:13
37	Suzanne Ritter	Germany	27:14
38	Dong Xiaoqin	China	27:15
39	Kate Reed	United Kingdom	27:16
40	Natalie Harvey	United Kingdom	27:22
41	Sun Wenqin	China	27:24
42	Anália Rosa	Portugal	27:25
43	Ana Dias	Portugal	27:32
44	Xi Qiuhong	China	27:32
45	Judit Plá	Spain	27:33
46	Teyiba Erkesso	Ethiopia	27:35
47	Rosemary Ryan	Ireland	27:35
48	Jiang Chengcheng	China	27:37
49	Renee Metivier	United States	27:37
50	Kayo Sugihara	Japan	27:37
51	Angeline Nyiransabimana	Rwanda	27:39
52	Teresa Recio	Spain	27:45
53	Hanan Collette	France	27:46
54	Emma Rilen	Australia	27:49
55	Yesenia Centeno	Spain	27:49
56	Zaituni Jumanne	Tanzania	27:50
57	Melissa Moon	New Zealand	27:52
58	Consalater Chemtai Yadaa	Kenya	27:52
59	Sharon Dickie-Thompson	United States	27:54
60	Poppy Mlambo	South Africa	28:01
61	Leonor Carneiro	Portugal	28:03
62	Zhang Chong	China	28:07
63	Alessandra Aguilar	Spain	28:11
64	Inês Monteiro	Portugal	28:17
65	Michiko Ogawa	Japan	28:21
66	Hattie Dean	United Kingdom	28:24
67	Olga Minina	Belarus	28:33
68	Anesie Kwizera	Burundi	28:36
69	Cláudia Pereira	Portugal	28:41
70	María Elena Moreno	Spain	28:42
71	Park Ho-Sun	South Korea	28:45
72	Inés Melchor	Peru	28:49
73	Rkia Chébili	France	28:56
74	Kim Hee-Yeon	South Korea	28:58
75	Susan Michelsson	Australia	29:01
76	Lamberte Nyabamikazi	Rwanda	29:02
77	Cari Kuzyk	Canada	29:10
78	Rosa Apaza	Bolivia	29:14
79	Yeisy Alvarez	Venezuela	29:19
80	Clemantine Nyiraguhirwa	Rwanda	29:24
81	Gemma Phillips	United Kingdom	29:29
82	Genessi Nyirahabimana	Rwanda	29:49
83	Esperance Mukarugwiza	Rwanda	29:58
84	Suh Hyun-Jin	South Korea	30:12
85	Norelys Lugo	Venezuela	30:12
86	Yolimar Pineda	Venezuela	30:13
87	Lakmini Bogahawatte	Sri Lanka	30:15
88	Emeliana Joseph	Tanzania	30:26
89	Rosa America Rodríguez	Venezuela	30:34
90	Tanice Barnett	Jamaica	30:38
91	Alda Maurício	Angola	30:43
92	Rini Budiarti	Indonesia	30:45
93	Kirsty Smith	Canada	30:53
94	Yohamna Luisa	Dominican Republic	31:53
95	Merrecia James	Jamaica	32:08
96	Tanica Thomas	Jamaica	32:14
97	Yekaterina Tunguskova	Uzbekistan	32:16
98	Nadine Henry	Jamaica	34:06
—	Jéssica Augusto	Portugal	DNF

==== Teams ====
Rank	Team	Points
1st place, gold medalist(s)	Ethiopia: Tirunesh Dibaba / 1; Meselech Melkamu / 3; Wude Ayalew / 5; Mestawat Tufa / 7; (Ejagayehu Dibaba) / (14); (Teyiba Erkesso) / (46)	16
2nd place, silver medalist(s)	Kenya: Evelyne Wambui / 8; Faith Jemutai / 9; Alice Chelangat / 10; Mercy Njoroge / 12; (Edna Kiplagat) / (13); (Consalater Chemtai Yadaa) / (58)	39
3rd place, bronze medalist(s)	Japan: Kayoko Fukushi / 6; Yoshimi Ozaki / 19; Megumi Oshima / 25; Yumi Sato / 30; (Kayo Sugihara) / (50); (Michiko Ogawa) / (65)	80
4	Australia: Benita Johnson / 4; Eloise Wellings / 22; Anna Thompson / 27; Victoria Mitchell / 34; (Emma Rilen) / (54); (Susan Michelsson) / (75)	87
5	United States: Blake Russell / 11; Katie McGregor / 21; Sara Slattery / 26; Colleen de Reuck / 33; (Renee Metivier) / (49); (Sharon Dickie-Thompson) / (59)	91
6	New Zealand: Nina Rillstone / 15; Kate McIlroy / 16; Jessica Ruthe / 24; Melissa Moon / 57	112
7	United Kingdom: Mara Yamauchi / 23; Kathy Butler / 32; Kate Reed / 39; Natalie Harvey / 40; (Hattie Dean) / (66); (Gemma Phillips) / (81)	134
8	China: Bao Guiying / 18; Dong Xiaoqin / 38; Sun Wenqin / 41; Xi Qiuhong / 44; (Jiang Chengcheng) / (48); (Zhang Chong) / (62)	141
9	France: Christine Bardelle / 20; Julie Coulaud / 29; Hanan Collette / 53; Rkia Chébili / 73	175
10	Spain: Rosa Morató / 36; Judit Plá / 45; Teresa Recio / 52; Yesenia Centeno / 55; (Alessandra Aguilar) / (63); (María Elena Moreno) / (70)	188
11	Tanzania: Ruhama Shauri / 28; Pascalina Bombo / 35; Zaituni Jumanne / 56; Emeliana Joseph / 88	207
12	Portugal: Anália Rosa / 42; Ana Dias / 43; Leonor Carneiro / 61; Inês Monteiro / 64; (Cláudia Pereira) / (69); (Jessica Augusto) / (DNF)	210
13	Rwanda: Angeline Nyiransabimana / 51; Lamberte Nyabamikazi / 76; Clemantine Nyiraguhirwa / 80; Genessi Nyirahabimana / 82; (Esperance Mukarugwiza) / (83)	289
14	Venezuela: Yeisy Alvarez / 79; Norelys Lugo / 85; Yolimar Pineda / 86; Rosa America Rodríguez / 89	339
15	Jamaica: Tanice Barnett / 90; Merrecia James / 95; Tanica Thomas / 96; Nadine Henry / 98	379

- Note: Athletes in parentheses did not score for the team result.

== Participation ==
According to an unofficial count, 99 athletes from 32 countries participated in the Senior women's race.

- Angola (1)
- Australia (6)
- Belarus (1)
- Bolivia (1)
- Burundi (1)
- Canada (2)
- China (6)
- Dominican Republic (1)
- Eritrea (1)
- Ethiopia (6)
- France (4)
- Germany (1)
- Indonesia (1)
- Ireland (1)
- Jamaica (4)
- Japan (6)
- Kenya (6)
- Mexico (1)
- Netherlands (1)
- New Zealand (4)
- Peru (1)
- Portugal (6)
- Rwanda (5)
- South Africa (1)
- South Korea (3)
- Spain (6)
- Sri Lanka (1)
- Tanzania (4)
- United Kingdom (6)
- United States (6)
- Uzbekistan (1)
- Venezuela (4)

== See also ==
- 2006 IAAF World Cross Country Championships – Senior men's race
- 2006 IAAF World Cross Country Championships – Men's short race
- 2006 IAAF World Cross Country Championships – Junior men's race
- 2006 IAAF World Cross Country Championships – Women's short race
- 2006 IAAF World Cross Country Championships – Junior women's race
