= Meraf Bahta =

Eritrean middle-distance runner

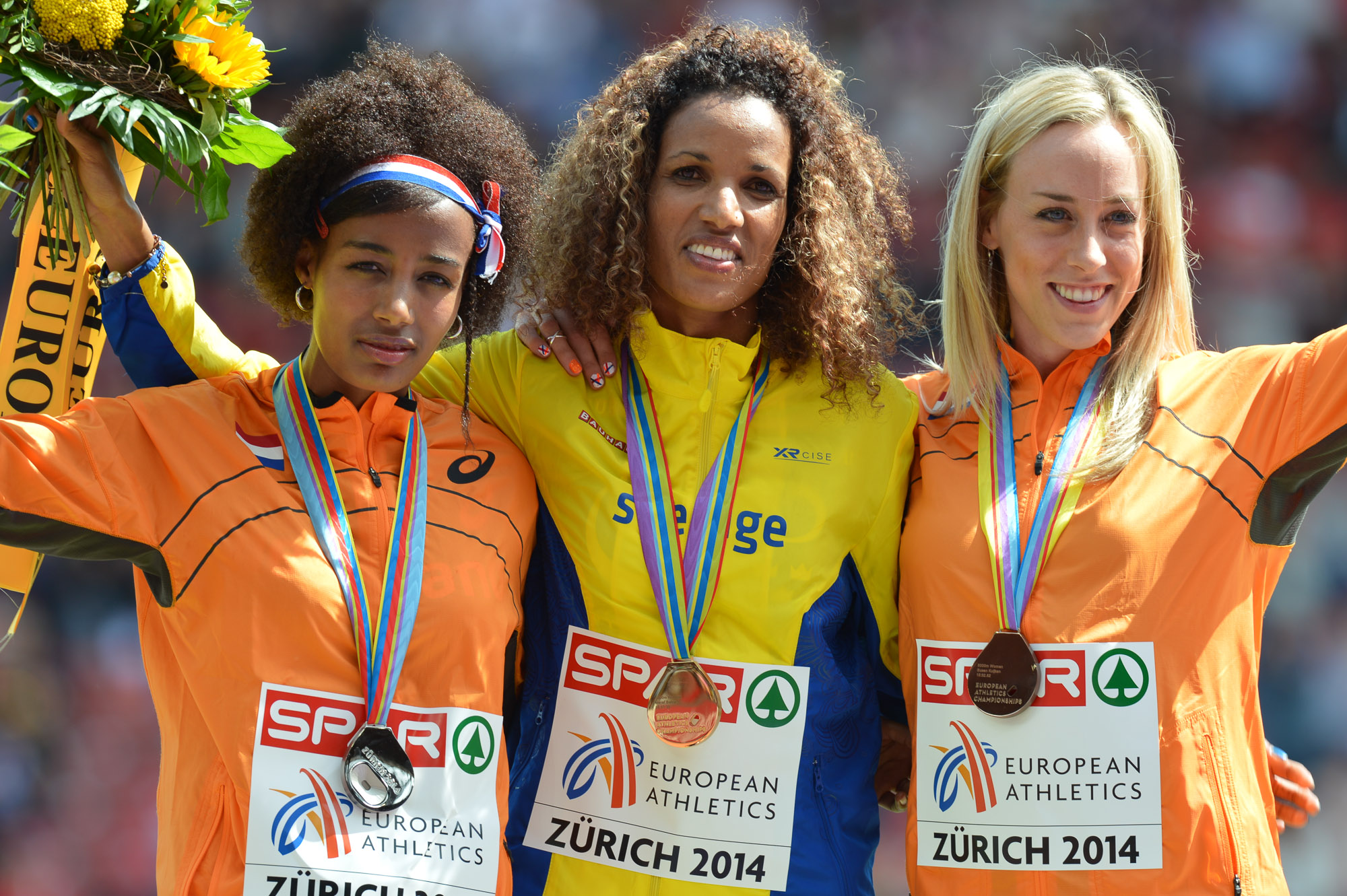

Medal record

Women's athletics

Representing Sweden

European Championships
Gold medal – first place	2014 Zürich	5000 m
Silver medal – second place	2016 Amsterdam	5000 m

European Cross Country Championships
Silver medal – second place	2017 Šamorín	Senior race
Bronze medal – third place	2014 Samokov	Senior race

Meraf Bahta Ogbagaber (born 24 June 1989) is a Swedish middle-distance runner. She represents Sweden in international competitions and specializes in the 1500 metres and 3000 metres.

== Biography ==
She was born in Dekishahay (at the time still part of Ethiopia). As a junior, she competed in the junior races at the IAAF World Cross Country Championships, finishing twelfth in 2006 and sixth in 2007. Together with her teammates she won the silver medal in the team event at the 2007 championships. She finished fifth in the 1500 metres at the 2006 World Junior Championships. At the 2007 All-Africa Games she finished seventh in the 5000 metres. She competed in her first senior cross-country race at the 2008 World Cross Country Championships, but only finished 43rd.

Her personal best times are 4:05.11 minutes in the 1500 metres, achieved in July 2013 in Heusden-Zolder; and 14:59.49 minutes in the 5000 metres, achieved in July 2014 in Palo Alto, USA. The 5000 personal best also marked a Swedish record (former was from 1995 held by Sara Wedlund). With the sub-15 race Meraf made her big international breakthrough and immediately became one of the best long-distance runners on European soil and a medal contender for future European Championships.

She moved from Eritrea to Sweden in 2008. In Sweden she has continued her running career, getting support from Ulf Friberg, the trainer of Mustafa Mohamed. Bahta got her permanent residency permit in 2012 and has applied for Swedish citizenship. In December she got her citizenship and since 2014 she has been eligible to compete for Sweden in international championships. She represented Sweden at the 2016 Summer Olympics finishing 6th in the 1500 m.

In 2014, she also won Tjejmilen.

She finished 9th in the 1500m at the 2017 World Athletics Championships.

== Doping suspension ==
On 26 July 2018, Swedish newspaper Aftonbladet reported that she was suspected of doping violations. On 24 June 2019, it was announced that she had been suspended for doping. The suspension period is partly retroactive, lasting from 1 September 2018 to 1 September 2019.

== Achievements ==
Year	Competition	Venue	Position	Event	Notes
Representing Eritrea
2005	World Cross Country Championships	Saint-Galmier, France	32nd	Junior race	22:43
2006	World Junior Championships	Beijing, China	5th	1500 m	4:16.01
2006	World Cross Country Championships	Fukuoka, Japan	12th	Junior race	20:22
2007	World Cross Country Championships	Mombasa, Kenya	6th	Junior race	21:24
2007	All-Africa Games	Algiers, Algeria	9th	1500 m	4:15.12
2007	All-Africa Games	Algiers, Algeria	7th	5000 m	15:56.30
2008	World Cross Country Championships	Edinburgh, Great Britain	43rd	Senior race	27:31
Representing Sweden
2014	European Championships	Zürich, Switzerland	1st	5000 m	15:31.39
2014	European Cross Country Championships	Samokov, Bulgaria	3rd	Senior race	28:52
2016	European Championships	Amsterdam, Netherlands	2nd	5000 m	15:20.54
2016	Olympic Games	Rio de Janeiro, Brazil	6th	1500 m	4:12.59
2017	European Indoor Championships	Belgrade, Serbia	4th	1500 m	4:07.90
2017	World Championships	London, United Kingdom	9th	1500 m	4:04.76
2017	European Cross Country Championships	Šamorín, Slovakia	2nd	Senior race	27:03
2018	World Indoor Championship	Birmingham, United Kingdom	10th	1500 m	4:23.05
2018	World Indoor Championship	Birmingham, United Kingdom	12th	3000 m	9:05.94
2018	European Championships	Berlin, Germany	DSQ	10,000 m	32:19.34
2021	European Indoor Championships	Toruń, Poland	4th	3000 m	8:48.78
2021	Olympic Games	Tokyo, Japan	18th	10,000 m	32:10.49
2022	World Indoor Championships	Belgrade, Serbia	17th	3000 m	8:58.68

=== Personal bests ===
Outdoor

- 1500 metres – 4:00.49 (Brussels; 1 September 2017)
- Mile – 4:25.26 (Oslo; 9 June 2016)
- 3000 metres – 8:37.50 (Doha; 21 July 2016) NR
- 5000 metres – 14:49.95 (Rabat; 22 May 2016) NR
- 10,000 metres – 31:13.06 (Palo Alto; 5 May 2017) NR

Indoor

- 1500 metres – 4:04.89 (Toruń; 15 February 2018)
- 3000 metres – 8:42.46 (Madrid; 8 February 2018) NR
