= Roberto Echeverría =

Chilean marathon runner

Personal information
- Full name: Roberto Carlos Echeverría; Boutaud
- Nationality: Chile
- Born: 23 February 1976 (age 50) Cunco, Araucanía, Chile
- Height: 1.67 m (5 ft 5 1/2 in)
- Weight: 55 kg (121 lb)

Sport
- Sport: Athletics
- Event: Marathon
- Club: Ejercito de Chile

Achievements and titles
- Personal best: Marathon: 2:15:37 (2008)
- Updated on 12 May 2014

Roberto Carlos Echeverría Boutaud (born February 23, 1976, in Cunco, Araucanía) is a Chilean marathon runner. He set a personal best time of 2:15:37, by winning the 2008 Santiago Marathon, earning him a spot on the Chilean team for the Olympics.

Echeverria represented Chile at the 2008 Summer Olympics in Beijing, where he competed for the men's marathon. He successfully finished the race in forty-ninth place by three seconds ahead of South Korea's Kim Yi-Yong, with a time of 2:23:54.

== Personal bests ==
- 3000 m: 8:07.71 – (Chile) Santiago, 25 April 2007
- 5000 m: 14:06.4 (ht) – (Chile) Concepción, 12 May 2007
- 10,000 m: 29:28.05 – (Chile) Valdivia, 8 February 2014
- Marathon: 2:15:37 – (Chile) Santiago, 6 April 2008

== Achievements ==
Year	Competition	Venue	Position	Event	Notes
Representing the Chile
1995	South American Junior Championships	Santiago, Chile	6th	5000 m	15:12.19
1995	Pan American Junior Championships	Santiago, Chile	9th	10,000 m	34:02.85
2003	South American Cross Country Championships	Asunción, Paraguay	4th	4 km	12:28
2003	South American Cross Country Championships	Asunción, Paraguay	3rd	12 km	40:00
2006	South American Cross Country Championships	Mar del Plata, Argentina	3rd	4 km	11:26
2006	South American Cross Country Championships	Mar del Plata, Argentina	7th	12 km	37:15
2006	World Cross Country Championships	Fukuoka, Japan	84th	4 km	11:57
2006	World Cross Country Championships	Fukuoka, Japan	88th	12 km	38:51
2007	South American Cross Country Championships	Rio de Janeiro, Brazil	11th	12 km	40:38
2008	Ibero-American Championships	Iquique, Chile	8th	5000 m	14:23.16
2008	Santiago Marathon	Santiago, Chile	1st	Marathon	2:15:37
2008	Olympic Games	Beijing, China	49th	Marathon	2:23:54
2009	South American Cross Country Championships	Concepción, Chile	1st	12 km	37:08
2014	South American Marathon Championships	Santiago, Chile	1st	Marathon	2:16:58
2015	Santiago Marathon	Santiago, Chile	1st	Half Marathon	1:05:40
2015	South American Championships	Lima, Peru	8th	10,000m	30:36.69
