= 1998 World Junior Championships in Athletics – Women's 5000 metres =

The women's 5000 metres event at the 1998 World Junior Championships in Athletics was held in Annecy, France, at Parc des Sports on 31 July and 2 August.

== Medalists ==
| Gold | Yin Lili; China |
| Silver | Faith Jemutai; Kenya |
| Bronze | Merima Hashim; Ethiopia |

== Results ==
=== Final ===
2 August

| Rank | Name | Nationality | Time | Notes |
|---|---|---|---|---|
| 1st place, gold medalist(s) | Yin Lili | China | 15:29.65 | |
| 2nd place, silver medalist(s) | Faith Jemutai | Kenya | 15:34.48 | |
| 3rd place, bronze medalist(s) | Merima Hashim | Ethiopia | 15:39.57 | |
| 4 | Jessica Carlberg | Sweden | 15:51.17 | |
| 5 | Worknesh Kidane | Ethiopia | 15:55.18 | |
| 6 | Prisca Ngetich | Kenya | 16:07.12 | |
| 7 | Charlotte Audier | France | 16:07.72 | |
| 8 | Siphuluwazi Sibindi | Zimbabwe | 16:18.16 | |
| 9 | Louise Kelly | United Kingdom | 16:20.51 | |
| 10 | Sunita Rani | India | 16:28.50 | |
| 11 | Cathérine Lallemand | Belgium | 16:32.39 | |
| 12 | Helena Volná | Czech Republic | 16:33.11 | |
| 13 | Yuka Hata | Japan | 16:38.66 | |
| | Song Liqing | China | DNS | |
| | Nadia Ejjafini | Morocco | DQ | IAAF rule 141 |

=== Heats ===
31 July

==== Heat 1 ====
| Rank | Name | Nationality | Time | Notes |
|---|---|---|---|---|
| 1 | Faith Jemutai | Kenya | 16:11.56 | Q |
| 2 | Song Liqing | China | 16:11.77 | Q |
| 3 | Worknesh Kidane | Ethiopia | 16:14.16 | Q |
| 4 | Siphuluwazi Sibindi | Zimbabwe | 16:21.99 | Q |
| 5 | Sunita Rani | India | 16:23.30 | q |
| 6 | Jessica Carlberg | Sweden | 16:24.83 | q |
| 7 | Tuula Laitinen | Finland | 16:30.38 | |
| 8 | Yelena Tolstygina | Belarus | 16:41.88 | |
| 9 | Yelena Samokhvalova | Russia | 16:45.72 | |
| 10 | Rosaria Console | Italy | 16:51.21 | |
| | Rachel Nthulane | South Africa | DNF | |
| | Nadia Ejjafini | Morocco | DQ | IAAF rule 141 Q |

==== Heat 2 ====
| Rank | Name | Nationality | Time | Notes |
|---|---|---|---|---|
| 1 | Yin Lili | China | 16:04.47 | Q |
| 2 | Helena Volná | Czech Republic | 16:09.10 | Q |
| 3 | Cathérine Lallemand | Belgium | 16:09.24 | Q |
| 4 | Merima Hashim | Ethiopia | 16:09.61 | Q |
| 5 | Charlotte Audier | France | 16:11.64 | Q |
| 6 | Prisca Ngetich | Kenya | 16:14.70 | q |
| 7 | Louise Kelly | United Kingdom | 16:15.36 | q |
| 8 | Yuka Hata | Japan | 16:18.54 | q |
| 9 | Sharlyn Maughan | United States | 16:55.68 | |
| 10 | Nicole Chapple | Australia | 16:57.02 | |
| 11 | Luvsanikhundeg Otgonbayar | Mongolia | 19:24.41 | |
| | Azwindini Lukhwareni | South Africa | DNF | |
| | Mirjana Glišovic | Yugoslavia | DNF | |

== Participation ==
According to an unofficial count, 25 athletes from 21 countries participated in the event.

- Australia (1)
- Belarus (1)
- Belgium (1)
- China (2)
- Czech Republic (1)
- Ethiopia (2)
- Finland (1)
- France (1)
- India (1)
- Italy (1)
- Japan (1)
- Kenya (2)
- Mongolia (1)
- Morocco (1)
- Russia (1)
- South Africa (2)
- Sweden (1)
- United Kingdom (1)
- United States (1)
- Yugoslavia (1)
- Zimbabwe (1)
