= 2006 IAAF World Cross Country Championships – Women's short race =

Women's short race at the 2006 IAAF World Cross Country Championships
- Organisers: IAAF
- Edition: 34th
- Date: April 2
- Host city: Fukuoka, Kyushu, Japan
- Venue: Umi-no-nakamichi Seaside Park
- Events: 6
- Distances: 4 km – Women's short
- Participation: 92 athletes from 26 nations

The women's short race at the 2006 IAAF World Cross Country Championships was held at the Umi-no-nakamichi Seaside Park in Fukuoka, Japan, on April 2, 2006. Reports of the event were given in The New York Times, and for the IAAF.

Complete results for individuals, for teams, medallists, and the results of British athletes who took part were published.

== Race results ==
=== Women's short race (4 km) ===
==== Individual ====
Rank	Athlete	Country	Time
1st place, gold medalist(s)	Gelete Burka	Ethiopia	12:51
2nd place, silver medalist(s)	Prisca Ngetich	Kenya	12:53
3rd place, bronze medalist(s)	Meselech Melkamu	Ethiopia	12:54
4	Benita Johnson	Australia	12:55
5	Lornah Kiplagat	Netherlands	12:55
6	Beatrice Chepchumba	Kenya	12:58
7	Zhor El Kamch	Morocco	13:03
8	Vivian Cheruiyot	Kenya	13:10
9	Bezunesh Bekele	Ethiopia	13:10
10	Isabella Ochichi	Kenya	13:11
11	Melissa Rollison	Australia	13:11
12	Teyiba Erkesso	Ethiopia	13:12
13	Etalemahu Kidane	Ethiopia	13:13
14	Nancy Wambui	Kenya	13:13
15	Mariem Alaoui Selsouli	Morocco	13:14
16	Olga Komyagina	Russia	13:16
17	Ruhama Shauri	Tanzania	13:20
18	Blake Russell	United States	13:21
19	Malindi Elmore	Canada	13:21
20	Bouchra Chaâbi	Morocco	13:23
21	Kara Goucher	United States	13:24
22	Carmen Douma-Hussar	Canada	13:25
23	Olesya Syreva	Russia	13:25
24	Courtney Babcock	Canada	13:27
25	Anna Thompson	Australia	13:27
26	Sara Bei-Hall	United States	13:28
27	Yelena Sidorchenkova	Russia	13:32
28	Kareema Jasim	Bahrain	13:33
29	Donna MacFarlane	Australia	13:34
30	Yuriko Kobayashi	Japan	13:34
31	Hanane Ouhaddou	Morocco	13:35
32	Dong Xiaoqin	China	13:35
33	Victoria Mitchell	Australia	13:36
34	Carrie Tollefson	United States	13:36
35	Bao Guiying	China	13:38
36	Liliya Shobukhova	Russia	13:39
37	Maryam Jamal	Bahrain	13:39
38	Sarah Schwald	United States	13:40
39	Eloise Wellings	Australia	13:41
40	Pascalina Bombo	Tanzania	13:42
41	Beatrice Rutto	Kenya	13:42
42	María Elena Valencia	Mexico	13:44
43	Sun Wenqin	China	13:45
44	Eleanor Baker	United Kingdom	13:45
45	Simret Sultan	Eritrea	13:45
46	Xi Qiuhong	China	13:51
47	Saïda El Mehdi	Morocco	13:51
48	Anastasiya Starovoytova	Belarus	13:52
49	Angela Rinicella	Italy	13:52
50	Megan Metcalfe	Canada	13:54
51	Zhang Chong	China	13:54
52	Jiang Chengcheng	China	13:54
53	Ayumi Hashimoto	Japan	13:55
54	Zaituni Jumanne	Tanzania	13:55
55	Taiba Waked	Bahrain	13:55
56	Fatima Ayachi	Morocco	13:56
57	Tara Quinn-Smith	Canada	13:57
58	René Kalmer	South Africa	14:05
59	Binnaz Uslu	Turkey	14:06
60	Adelina De Soccio	Italy	14:07
61	Yekaterina Volkova	Russia	14:07
62	Lisa Van Der Merwe	South Africa	14:07
63	Hilarie Dusabimana	Rwanda	14:07
64	Freya Murray	United Kingdom	14:08
65	Lizzy Hall	United Kingdom	14:08
66	Amy Mortimer	United States	14:10
67	Nicolene Van Rooyen	South Africa	14:12
68	Mika Yoshikawa	Japan	14:21
69	Poppy Mlambo	South Africa	14:22
70	Angélique Nibigira	Burundi	14:23
71	Elodie Olivares	France	14:24
72	Violet Raseboya	South Africa	14:24
73	Valeria Rodríguez	Argentina	14:26
74	Chanelle Olivier	South Africa	14:29
75	Rie Takayoshi	Japan	14:30
76	Emeliana Joseph	Tanzania	14:32
77	Minori Hayakari	Japan	14:33
78	Kokob Mehari	Eritrea	14:41
79	Tomoko Ishii	Japan	14:43
80	María Peralta	Argentina	14:46
81	Diana Seigi	Bahrain	14:51
82	Tanice Barnett	Jamaica	14:59
83	Parfaite Nimbona	Burundi	15:09
84	Nadia Rodríguez	Argentina	15:11
85	Carina Allay	Argentina	15:18
86	Merrecia James	Jamaica	15:35
87	Tanica Thomas	Jamaica	15:39
88	Ziyodahon Abdullaeva	Uzbekistan	15:44
89	Kavita Raut	India	16:21
90	Marina Khmelevskaya	Uzbekistan	16:32
91	Nadine Henry	Jamaica	16:56
—	Tirunesh Dibaba	Ethiopia	DNF

==== Teams ====
Rank	Team	Points
1st place, gold medalist(s)	Ethiopia: Gelete Burka / 1; Meselech Melkamu / 3; Bezunesh Bekele / 9; Teyiba Erkesso / 12; (Etalemahu Kidane) / (13); (Tirunesh Dibaba) / (DNF)	25
2nd place, silver medalist(s)	Kenya: Prisca Ngetich / 2; Beatrice Chepchumba / 6; Vivian Cheruiyot / 8; Isabella Ochichi / 10; (Nancy Wambui) / (14); (Beatrice Rutto) / (41)	26
3rd place, bronze medalist(s)	Australia: Benita Johnson / 4; Melissa Rollison / 11; Anna Thompson / 25; Donna MacFarlane / 29; (Victoria Mitchell) / (33); (Eloise Wellings) / (39)	69
4	Morocco: Zhor El Kamch / 7; Mariem Alaoui Selsouli / 15; Bouchra Chaâbi / 20; Hanane Ouhaddou / 31; (Saïda El Mehdi) / (47); (Fatima Ayachi) / (56)	73
5	United States: Blake Russell / 18; Kara Goucher / 21; Sara Bei-Hall / 26; Carrie Tollefson / 34; (Sarah Schwald) / (38); (Amy Mortimer) / (66)	99
6	Russia: Olga Komyagina / 16; Olesya Syreva / 23; Yelena Sidorchenkova / 27; Liliya Shobukhova / 36; (Yekaterina Volkova) / (61)	102
7	Canada: Malindi Elmore / 19; Carmen Douma-Hussar / 22; Courtney Babcock / 24; Megan Metcalfe / 50; (Tara Quinn-Smith) / (57)	115
8	China: Dong Xiaoqin / 32; Bao Guiying / 35; Sun Wenqin / 43; Xi Qiuhong / 46; (Zhang Chong) / (51); (Jiang Chengcheng) / (52)	156
9	Tanzania: Ruhama Shauri / 17; Pascalina Bombo / 40; Zaituni Jumanne / 54; Emeliana Joseph / 76	187
10	Bahrain: Kareema Jasim / 28; Maryam Jamal / 37; Taiba Waked / 55; Diana Seigi / 81	201
11	Japan: Yuriko Kobayashi / 30; Ayumi Hashimoto / 53; Mika Yoshikawa / 68; Rie Takayoshi / 75; (Minori Hayakari) / (77); (Tomoko Ishii) / (79)	226
12	South Africa: René Kalmer / 58; Lisa Van Der Merwe / 62; Nicolene Van Rooyen / 67; Poppy Mlambo / 69; (Violet Raseboya) / (72); (Chanelle Olivier) / (74)	256
13	Argentina: Valeria Rodríguez / 73; María Peralta / 80; Nadia Rodríguez / 84; Carina Allay / 85	322
14	Jamaica: Tanice Barnett / 82; Merrecia James / 86; Tanica Thomas / 87; Nadine Henry / 91	346

- Note: Athletes in parentheses did not score for the team result.

== Participation ==
According to an unofficial count, 92 athletes from 26 countries participated in the Women's short race.

- Argentina (4)
- Australia (6)
- Bahrain (4)
- Belarus (1)
- Burundi (2)
- Canada (5)
- China (6)
- Eritrea (2)
- Ethiopia (6)
- France (1)
- India (1)
- Italy (2)
- Jamaica (4)
- Japan (6)
- Kenya (6)
- Mexico (1)
- Morocco (6)
- Netherlands (1)
- Russia (5)
- Rwanda (1)
- South Africa (6)
- Tanzania (4)
- Turkey (1)
- United Kingdom (3)
- United States (6)
- Uzbekistan (2)

== See also ==
- 2006 IAAF World Cross Country Championships – Senior men's race
- 2006 IAAF World Cross Country Championships – Men's short race
- 2006 IAAF World Cross Country Championships – Junior men's race
- 2006 IAAF World Cross Country Championships – Senior women's race
- 2006 IAAF World Cross Country Championships – Junior women's race
