= 2006 IAAF World Cross Country Championships – Junior women's race =

Junior women's race at the 2006 IAAF World Cross Country Championships
- Organisers: IAAF
- Edition: 34th
- Date: April 1
- Host city: Fukuoka, Kyushu, Japan
- Venue: Umi-no-nakamichi Seaside Park
- Events: 1
- Distances: 6 km – Junior women
- Participation: 78 athletes from 25 nations

The Junior women's race at the 2006 IAAF World Cross Country Championships was held at the Umi-no-nakamichi Seaside Park in Fukuoka, Japan, on April 1, 2006. Reports on the event were given in The New York Times, and for the IAAF.

Complete results for individuals, for teams, medallists, and the results of British athletes who took part were published.

== Race results ==
=== Junior women's race (6 km) ===
==== Individual ====
Rank	Athlete	Country	Time
1st place, gold medalist(s)	Pauline Korikwiang	Kenya	19:27
2nd place, silver medalist(s)	Veronica Wanjiru	Kenya	19:27
3rd place, bronze medalist(s)	Mercy Kosgei	Kenya	19:45
4	Emmy Chepkirui	Kenya	19:52
5	Belainesh Zemedkun	Ethiopia	19:56
6	Workitu Ayanu	Ethiopia	19:57
7	Emebt Etea	Ethiopia	20:05
8	Pamela Chesopich Lisoreng	Kenya	20:06
9	Gladys Chemweno	Kenya	20:09
10	Sian Edwards	United Kingdom	20:10
11	Asselefech Assefa	Ethiopia	20:22
12	Merat Bahta	Eritrea	20:22
13	Hitomi Niiya	Japan	20:25
14	Megumi Kinukawa	Japan	20:29
15	Kazue Kojima	Japan	20:29
16	Yuko Nohara	Japan	20:31
17	Chisato Ozaki	Japan	20:33
18	Madeline Heiner	Australia	20:39
19	Marta Romo	Spain	20:46
20	Elsa Medhanie	Eritrea	20:56
21	Derebe Godan	Ethiopia	20:56
22	Aïcha Bani	Morocco	20:56
23	Aimi Horikoshi	Japan	20:57
24	Furtuna Zegergish	Eritrea	21:09
25	Weini Tedros Tesfay	Eritrea	21:10
26	Pelagie Musengimana	Rwanda	21:10
27	Magdalena Lotter	South Africa	21:11
28	Viktoriya Ivanova	Russia	21:12
29	Aïcha Rezig	Algeria	21:13
30	Stephanie Twell	United Kingdom	21:14
31	McKayla Plank	United States	21:15
32	Asmae Ghizlane	Morocco	21:19
33	Natalya Starkova	Russia	21:19
34	Erin Bedell	United States	21:20
35	Lucy Starrat	Australia	21:21
36	Non Stanford	United Kingdom	21:24
37	Danielle Sale	United Kingdom	21:24
38	Kauren Tarver	United States	21:26
39	Nicole Blood	United States	21:28
40	Kheira Belmediouni	Algeria	21:38
41	Fouzia Majdoubi	Morocco	21:40
42	Lara Tamsett	Australia	21:40
43	Jessica Sparke	United Kingdom	21:41
44	Kate Van Buskirk	Canada	21:42
45	Natalya Orlova	Russia	21:42
46	Sheila Reid	Canada	21:52
47	Fatima Ouezzani	Morocco	21:55
48	Houda Regragui	Morocco	21:57
49	Mandy McBean	Canada	21:58
50	Joanne Harvey	United Kingdom	21:59
51	Lucy Oliver	New Zealand	21:59
52	Marie Lawrence	United States	22:05
53	Karina Villazana	Peru	22:07
54	Sitora Hamidova	Uzbekistan	22:13
55	Astrid Leutert	Switzerland	22:13
56	Anita Campbell	Canada	22:17
57	Cátia Galhardo	Portugal	22:18
58	Lindsay Carson	Canada	22:20
59	Majida Maayouf	Morocco	22:21
60	Valentina Costanza	Italy	22:23
61	Tarah McKay	Canada	22:24
62	Yekaterina Gorbunova	Russia	22:38
63	Rachel Green	Australia	22:40
64	Volha Kaminskaya	Belarus	22:46
65	Amina Bettiche	Algeria	22:48
66	Rocío Cántara	Peru	22:50
67	Madeline McKeever	United States	22:52
68	Antonina Popova	Kazakhstan	22:59
69	Sara Louise Treacy	Ireland	23:11
70	Yamina Mescari	Algeria	23:14
71	Sarah Grahame	Australia	23:28
72	Luciana Viengo	Angola	23:49
73	Chahrazed Bououden	Algeria	24:01
74	Rocio Huillca	Peru	25:11
75	Belen Chaiza	Peru	25:30
—	Sara Cardona	Spain	DNF
—	Arina Korobitskaya	Kyrgyzstan	DNF
—	Yuliya Mochalova	Russia	DQ^{†}

^{†}: Yuliya Mochalova from Russia finished 24th in 21:03 min, but was disqualified because of doping violations.

==== Teams ====
Rank	Team	Points
1st place, gold medalist(s)	Kenya: Pauline Korikwiang / 1; Veronica Wanjiru / 2; Mercy Kosgei / 3; Emmy Chepkirui / 4; (Pamela Chesopich Lisoreng) / (8); (Gladys Chemweno) / (9)	10
2nd place, silver medalist(s)	Ethiopia: Belainesh Zemedkun / 5; Workitu Ayanu / 6; Emebt Etea / 7; Asselefech Assefa / 11; (Derebe Godan) / (21)	29
3rd place, bronze medalist(s)	Japan: Hitomi Niiya / 13; Megumi Kinukawa / 14; Kazue Kojima / 15; Yuko Nohara / 16; (Chisato Ozaki) / (17); (Aimi Horikoshi) / (23)	58
4	Eritrea: Merat Bahta / 12; Elsa Medhanie / 20; Furtuna Zegergish / 24; Weini Tedros Tesfay / 25	81
5	United Kingdom: Sian Edwards / 10; Stephanie Twell / 30; Non Stanford / 36; Danielle Sale / 37; (Jessica Sparke) / (43); (Joanne Harvey) / (50)	113
6	United States: McKayla Plank / 31; Erin Bedell / 34; Kauren Tarver / 38; Nicole Blood / 39; (Marie Lawrence) / (52); (Madeline McKeever) / (67)	142
7	Morocco: Aïcha Bani / 22; Asmae Ghizlane / 32; Fouzia Majdoubi / 41; Fatima Ouezzani / 47; (Houda Regragui) / (48); (Majida Maayouf) / (59)	142
8	Australia: Madeline Heiner / 18; Lucy Starrat / 35; Lara Tamsett / 42; Rachel Green / 63; (Sarah Grahame) / (71)	158
9	Russia: Viktoriya Ivanova / 28; Natalya Starkova / 33; Natalya Orlova / 45; Yekaterina Gorbunova / 62	168
10	Canada: Kate Van Buskirk / 44; Sheila Reid / 46; Mandy McBean / 49; Anita Campbell / 56; (Lindsay Carson) / (58); (Tarah McKay) / (61)	195
11	Algeria: Aïcha Rezig / 29; Kheira Belmediouni / 40; Amina Bettiche / 65; Yamina Mescari / 70; (Chahrazed Bououden) / (73)	204
12	Peru: Karina Villazana / 53; Rocío Cántara / 66; Rocio Huillca / 74; Belen Chaiza / 75	268

- Note: Athletes in parentheses did not score for the team result.

== Participation ==
According to an unofficial count, 78 athletes from 25 countries participated in the Junior women's race. This is in agreement with the official numbers as published.

- Algeria (5)
- Angola (1)
- Australia (5)
- Belarus (1)
- Canada (6)
- Eritrea (4)
- Ethiopia (5)
- Ireland (1)
- Italy (1)
- Japan (6)
- Kazakhstan (1)
- Kenya (6)
- Kyrgyzstan (1)
- Morocco (6)
- New Zealand (1)
- Peru (4)
- Portugal (1)
- Russia (5)
- Rwanda (1)
- South Africa (1)
- Spain (2)
- Switzerland (1)
- United Kingdom (6)
- United States (6)
- Uzbekistan (1)

== See also ==
- 2006 IAAF World Cross Country Championships – Senior men's race
- 2006 IAAF World Cross Country Championships – Men's short race
- 2006 IAAF World Cross Country Championships – Junior men's race
- 2006 IAAF World Cross Country Championships – Senior women's race
- 2006 IAAF World Cross Country Championships – Women's short race
