= Fukatsu =

Fukatsu (written: 深津) is a Japanese surname. Notable people with the surname include:

- Akihiro Fukatsu (深津 旭弘, born 1987), Japanese volleyball player
- Eri Fukatsu (深津 絵里, born 1973), Japanese actress
- Hideomi Fukatsu (深津 英臣, born 1990), Japanese volleyball player
- Kota Fukatsu (深津 康太, born 1984), Japanese footballer
- Naoko Fukatsu (深津 尚子, born 1944), Japanese tennis table player
- Takuya Fukatsu (深津 卓也, born 1987), Japanese long-distance runner
