= 2006 IAAF World Cross Country Championships – Junior men's race =

Junior men's race at the 2006 IAAF World Cross Country Championships
- Organisers: IAAF
- Edition: 34th
- Date: April 2
- Host city: Fukuoka, Kyushu, Japan
- Venue: Umi-no-nakamichi Seaside Park
- Events: 1
- Distances: 8 km – Junior men
- Participation: 98 athletes from 29 nations

The Junior men's race at the 2006 IAAF World Cross Country Championships was held at the Umi-no-nakamichi Seaside Park in Fukuoka, Japan, on April 2, 2006. Reports of the event were given in The New York Times, and for the IAAF.

Complete results for individuals, for teams, medallists, and the results of British athletes who took part were published.

== Race results ==
=== Junior men's race (8 km) ===
==== Individual ====
Rank	Athlete	Country	Time
1st place, gold medalist(s)	Mang'ata Ndiwa	Kenya	23:53
2nd place, silver medalist(s)	Leonard Patrick Komon	Kenya	23:54
3rd place, bronze medalist(s)	Tariku Bekele	Ethiopia	23:56
4	Joseph Ebuya	Kenya	23:59
5	Ibrahim Jellan	Ethiopia	24:04
6	Habtamu Fikadu	Ethiopia	24:04
7	Kamal Ali Thamer	Qatar	24:05
8	Samuel Tsegay	Eritrea	24:06
9	Bernard Matheka	Kenya	24:08
10	Tadesse Tola	Ethiopia	24:09
11	Kidane Tadasse	Eritrea	24:21
12	Kiflom Slum	Eritrea	24:22
13	Teklemariam Medhin	Eritrea	24:26
14	Geoffrey Kusuro	Uganda	24:30
15	Daniel Gitau	Kenya	24:34
16	Demssew Tsega	Ethiopia	24:36
17	Adam Khamees	Bahrain	24:41
18	Naser Jamal Naser	Qatar	24:42
19	Fred Arapsudi	Uganda	24:51
20	Mouhssine Cherkaoui	Morocco	24:51
21	Belal Ali	Bahrain	24:52
22	Tsuyoshi Ugachi	Japan	24:52
23	Nicholas Kwemoi	Uganda	24:55
24	Stephen Kiprotich	Uganda	25:02
25	Saleh Bakheet	Bahrain	25:07
26	Saad Salem Malek	Qatar	25:13
27	Takuya Fukatsu	Japan	25:16
28	Yuta Takahashi	Japan	25:18
29	Pierre-Célestin Nihorimbere	Burundi	25:24
30	Andrea Lalli	Italy	25:24
31	Mohamed Bouifalloussene	Morocco	25:28
32	Mohammed Abduh Bakhet	Qatar	25:29
33	Takafumi Yanase	Japan	25:30
34	Kiel Uhl	United States	25:31
35	Kodai Matsumoto	Japan	25:31
36	Moussa Karich	Morocco	25:36
37	Abaid Ezzamzami	Morocco	25:36
38	Eshaaq Abdeen	Bahrain	25:40
39	Andrew Bumbalough	United States	25:41
40	Aaron Arias	Mexico	25:54
41	Ezechiel Nizigiyimana	Burundi	25:56
42	Harutomo Kawano	Japan	25:57
43	Abdelghani Aït Bahmad	Morocco	25:59
44	Jake Robertson	New Zealand	26:02
45	Adam Hickey	United Kingdom	26:02
46	Diego Borrego	Mexico	26:10
47	Scott Macpherson	United States	26:13
48	Vitor Reis	Portugal	26:16
49	Mohamed Kathari	Spain	26:16
50	Jordan McDougal	United States	26:26
51	Junior Campos	Brazil	26:27
52	Joilson da Silva	Brazil	26:28
53	Ciprian Suhanea	Romania	26:35
54	Tim Hodge	New Zealand	26:35
55	Zamlandela Esau Nkosi	South Africa	26:36
56	Simone Gariboldi	Italy	26:37
57	Antonio Garavello	Italy	26:39
58	Michael Eaton	United States	26:39
59	Marcus Dillon	Canada	26:40
60	José Luis Galvan	Spain	26:41
61	Javier García	Spain	26:43
62	Lee Carey	United Kingdom	26:45
63	Anton Popov	Kazakhstan	26:49
64	Alvaro Rodríguez	Spain	26:53
65	Shafat Salad	New Zealand	26:54
66	Lewis Timmins	United Kingdom	26:55
67	Ronaldo Rocha	Brazil	26:56
68	Alessandro Salsi	Italy	26:57
69	Iván Fernández	Spain	27:01
70	Nabil Ouhadi	Morocco	27:06
71	Ryu Ji-San	South Korea	27:07
72	Hayden McLaren	New Zealand	27:19
73	Sean Fleming	Canada	27:22
74	Siyabonga Nkonde	South Africa	27:25
75	Allan Brett	Canada	27:27
76	Juan Antonio Pousa	Spain	27:28
77	Vincenzo Stola	Italy	27:29
78	Kris Gauson	United Kingdom	27:32
79	Tom Boardman	United Kingdom	27:38
80	Thuso Ishmael Phaswana	South Africa	27:45
81	António Silva	Portugal	27:46
82	Stephen Scullion	Ireland	27:52
83	Antonio Domingos	Angola	27:56
84	Kyle Boorsma	Canada	28:00
85	Luigi Di Biseglie	Italy	28:04
86	Joseph Brunsting	Canada	28:05
87	Luis Barbosa	Brazil	28:06
88	Nicholas Swinburn	United Kingdom	28:30
89	Nozim Ummatov	Uzbekistan	29:23
90	Firdavs Azizov	Tajikistan	31:08
—	Stefan Patru	Romania	DNF
—	Abdelghani Bensaadi	Algeria	DNF
—	Sergey Chabiarak	Belarus	DNF
—	Stefan Breit	Switzerland	DNF
—	Cory Currie	Canada	DNF
—	Chris Barnicle	United States	DNF
—	Thomas Longosiwa	Kenya	DQ^{†}
—	Tareq Taher	Bahrain	DQ^{†}
—	Abera Ertiban	Ethiopia	DNS

^{†}: Thomas Longosiwa of Kenya originally finished 13th in 24:25 and Tareq Taher of Bahrain originally finished 20th in 24:49, but were disqualified for age falsification.

==== Teams ====
Rank	Team	Points
1st place, gold medalist(s)	Kenya: Mang'ata Ndiwa / 1; Leonard Patrick Komon / 2; Joseph Ebuya / 4; Bernard Matheka / 9; (Daniel Gitau) / (15)	16
2nd place, silver medalist(s)	Ethiopia: Tariku Bekele / 3; Ibrahim Jellan / 5; Habtamu Fikadu / 6; Tadesse Tola / 10; (Demssew Tsega) / (16)	24
3rd place, bronze medalist(s)	Eritrea: Samuel Tsegay / 8; Kidane Tadasse / 11; Kiflom Slum / 12; Teklemariam Medhin / 13	44
4	Uganda: Geoffrey Kusuro / 14; Fred Arapsudi / 19; Nicholas Kwemoi / 23; Stephen Kiprotich / 24	80
5	Qatar: Kamal Ali Thamer / 7; Naser Jamal Naser / 18; Saad Salem Malek / 26; Mohammed Abduh Bakhet / 32	83
6	Bahrain: Adam Khamees / 17; Belal Ali / 21; Saleh Bakheet / 25; Eshaaq Abdeen / 38	101
7	Japan: Tsuyoshi Ugachi / 22; Takuya Fukatsu / 27; Yuta Takahashi / 28; Takafumi Yanase / 33; (Kodai Matsumoto) / (35); (Harutomo Kawano) / (42)	110
8	Morocco: Mouhssine Cherkaoui / 20; Mohamed Bouifalloussene / 31; Moussa Karich / 36; Abaid Ezzamzami / 37; (Abdelghani Aït Bahmad) / (43); (Nabil Ouhadi) / (70)	124
9	United States: Kiel Uhl / 34; Andrew Bumbalough / 39; Scott Macpherson / 47; Jordan McDougal / 50; (Michael Eaton) / (58); (Chris Barnicle) / (DNF)	170
10	Italy: Andrea Lalli / 30; Simone Gariboldi / 56; Antonio Garavello / 57; Alessandro Salsi / 68; (Vincenzo Stola) / (77); (Luigi Di Biseglie) / (85)	211
11	Spain: Mohamed Kathari / 49; José Luis Galvan / 60; Javier García / 61; Alvaro Rodríguez / 64; (Iván Fernández) / (69); (Juan Antonio Pousa) / (76)	234
12	New Zealand: Jake Robertson / 44; Tim Hodge / 54; Shafat Salad / 65; Hayden McLaren / 72	235
13	United Kingdom: Adam Hickey / 45; Lee Carey / 62; Lewis Timmins / 66; Kris Gauson / 78; (Tom Boardman) / (79); (Nicholas Swinburn) / (88)	251
14	Brazil: Junior Campos / 51; Joilson da Silva / 52; Ronaldo Rocha / 67; Luis Barbosa / 87	257
15	Canada: Marcus Dillon / 59; Sean Fleming / 73; Allan Brett / 75; Kyle Boorsma / 84; (Joseph Brunsting) / (86); (Cory Currie) / (DNF)	291

- Note: Athletes in parentheses did not score for the team result.

== Participation ==
According to an unofficial count, 98 athletes from 29 countries participated in the Junior men's race. This is in agreement with the official numbers as published.

- Algeria (1)
- Angola (1)
- Bahrain (5)
- Belarus (1)
- Brazil (4)
- Burundi (2)
- Canada (6)
- Eritrea (4)
- Ethiopia (5)
- Ireland (1)
- Italy (6)
- Japan (6)
- Kazakhstan (1)
- Kenya (6)
- Mexico (2)
- Morocco (6)
- New Zealand (4)
- Portugal (2)
- Qatar (4)
- Romania (2)
- South Africa (3)
- South Korea (1)
- Spain (6)
- Switzerland (1)
- Tajikistan (1)
- Uganda (4)
- United Kingdom (6)
- United States (6)
- Uzbekistan (1)

== See also ==
- 2006 IAAF World Cross Country Championships – Senior men's race
- 2006 IAAF World Cross Country Championships – Men's short race
- 2006 IAAF World Cross Country Championships – Senior women's race
- 2006 IAAF World Cross Country Championships – Women's short race
- 2006 IAAF World Cross Country Championships – Junior women's race
