= Priscah Jepleting Cherono =

Kenyan long-distance runner (born 1980)

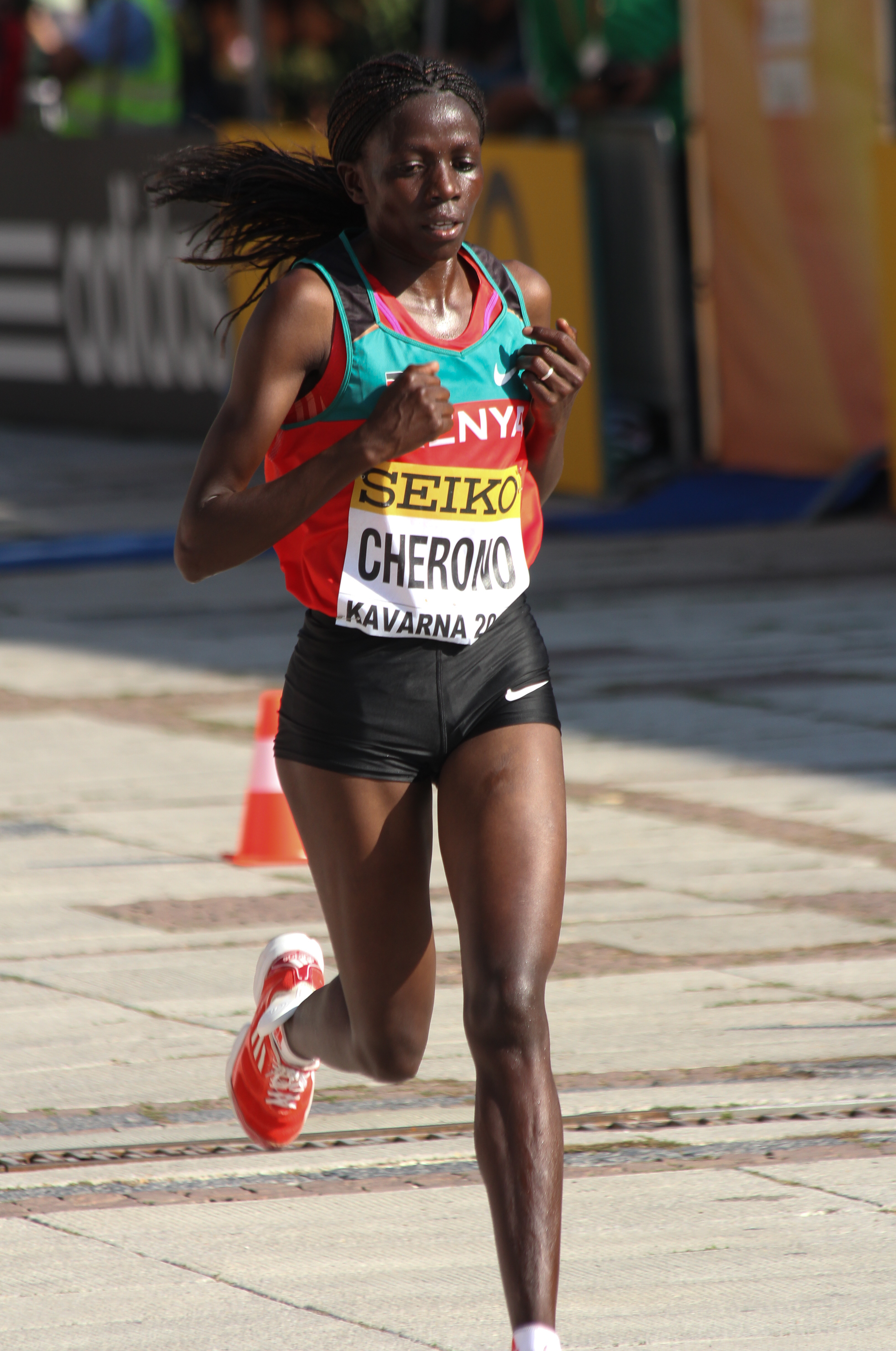

Personal information
- Born: June 27, 1980 (age 46)
Medal record
Women's athletics
Representing Kenya
World Championships
Bronze medal – third place	2007 Osaka	5000 m
African Championships
Silver medal – second place	2004 Brazzaville	5000 m
Silver medal – second place	2012 Porto-Novo	10,000 m

Priscah Jepleting Cherono, née Ngetich (born 27 June 1980) is a Kenyan professional runner who specialises in the 5000 metres and cross-country running. She represented Kenya in the 5000 m at the 2008 Beijing Olympics. She is the Kenyan record holder over the two miles distance.

She has represented Kenya twice at the World Championships in Athletics, winning the bronze medal in the 5000 m in 2007. She was the silver medallist in the event at the 2004 African Championships in Athletics. She has run for her country at the IAAF World Cross Country Championships ten times between 1997 and 2011, helping Kenya to five team medals. She was the runner-up in the short race at the 2006 edition.

== Career ==
She started running while she went to Tamboiya Primary School and later attended Kapkenda Girls Secondary School. She represented Kenya for the first time at the 1996 World Junior Championships in Athletics, coming eighth over 5000 metres. At the 1997 IAAF World Cross Country Championships she won the junior silver medal and team title alongside winner Rose Kosgei. She was eleventh in the junior race at the 1998 World Cross then improved to sixth in the 5000 m at the 1998 World Junior Championships in Athletics.

As a senior, she enjoyed most of her early success in the short race at the World Cross Country Championships. After a lowly senior debut of 78th place in 2000 she steadily improved, taking 18th in 2002, then 11th in 2003. At the 2005 edition her fourth-place finish helped the Kenyan women to the team silver medal. She won the individual silver in the short race at the 2006 World Cross Country Championships, leading the Kenyan team to second place behind Ethiopia. She ran in Italy that year and won both the Cross della Vallagarina and Giro Media Blenio races.

Around the same period she began to make progress on the track. After winning the silver medal at the 2004 African Championships in Athletics, she ran for Kenya at the 2005 World Championships in Athletics, coming seventh in her global senior 5000 m debut. She was also eighth over 3000 metres at the 2005 IAAF World Athletics Final. Cherono won her first world track medal at the 2007 World Championships in Athletics, taking the bronze medal just behind her compatriot Vivian Cheruiyot. Two further bronzes came at the 2007 IAAF World Athletics Final, where she reached the podium over both the 3000 m and 5000 m events. She also ran a Kenyan record for the two miles run at the Memorial Van Damme with her time of 9:14.09 minutes, although she was beaten by Meseret Defar who set a world record.

Cherono finished seventh in the senior races at both the 2007 and 2008 IAAF World Cross Country Championships, sharing in a team silver medal with Kenya on both occasions. She won the Itálica and Juan Muguerza cross country meets in 2008. She represented Kenya at the 2008 Summer Olympics, coming eleventh in the 5000 m final. Her season ended with a fifth-place finish over 5000 m at the 2008 IAAF World Athletics Final. She missed virtually all of 2009 and 2010 as she took time away from the sport to have her first child.

She came third at the 2010 Lotto Cross Cup Brussels. She ended the year at the BOclassic, where she finished in third place. She defeated Priscah Jeptoo at the Discovery Kenya Cross Country in January 2011 and set her sights on making that year's national team for the world competition. With a third-place finish at the Kenyan Cross Country Championships in February, she secured her return to the world event. She was fifth at the 2011 IAAF World Cross Country Championships, forming part of the winning Kenyan women's team. She was selected for the Kenyan 10,000 m team for the first time for the 2011 World Championships in Athletics and she came fourth in an unprecedented Kenyan sweep of the top four positions. The following month she won the Dam tot Damloop with a world-leading time of 51:57 minutes for the 10-mile distance.

Her win-streak continued on to grass at the Cross de la Constitución, where she comfortably beat Frehiwat Goshu, then at the Venta de Baños Cross. Following a fever, she was runner-up to Nazret Weldu at the 2012 Cross Zornotza and she won the 80th Cinque Mulini and Trofeo Alasport races. She missed out on a place in the 10,000 m for the 2012 Summer Olympics, but was selected for the 2012 African Championships in Athletics, where she was the silver medallist. She made a fast half marathon debut in September, recording 1:08:35 hours for third at the Lille Half Marathon, but finished outside the top twenty at the 2012 IAAF World Half Marathon Championships.

== Achievements ==
Year	Competition	Venue	Position	Event	Notes
Representing Kenya
1996	World Junior Championships	Sydney, Australia	8th	5000m	16:20.39
1998	World Junior Championships	Annecy, France	6th	5000 m	16:07.12
2003	World Cross Country Championships	Lausanne, Switzerland	11th	Short race (4.03 km)	13:04
2004	African Championships	Brazzaville, Republic of the Congo	2nd	5000 m	16:26.15
2005	World Cross Country Championships	Saint-Galmier, France	4th	Short race (4.196 km)	13:25
2005	World Championships	Helsinki, Finland	7th	5000 m	14:44.00
2005	World Athletics Final	Monte Carlo, Monaco	8th	3000 m	8:53.18
2006	World Cross Country Championships	Fukuoka, Japan	2nd	Short race (4 km)	12:53
2006	World Cross Country Championships	Fukuoka, Japan	2nd	Team	26 pts
2006	World Athletics Final	Stuttgart, Germany	9th	5000 m	16:13.06
2007	World Cross Country Championships	Mombasa, Kenya	7th	Senior race (8 km)	27:39
2007	World Cross Country Championships	Mombasa, Kenya	2nd	Team	26 pts
2007	World Championships	Osaka, Japan	3rd	5000 m	14:59.21
2007	World Athletics Final	Stuttgart, Germany	3rd	5000 m	14:58.97
2008	World Cross Country Championships	Edinburgh, United Kingdom	7th	Senior race (7.905 km)	25:36
2008	Olympic Games	Beijing, China	11th	5000 m	15:51.78
2011	World Championships	Daegu, South Korea	4th	10,000 m	30:56.43

=== Personal bests ===
- 3000 metres – 8:30.70 min (2007)
- 5000 metres – 14:35.30 min (2006)
- 10,000 metres – 30:56.43 min (2011)
