= 2006 World Junior Championships in Athletics – Women's 5000 metres =

The women's 5000 metres event at the 2006 World Junior Championships in Athletics was held in Beijing, China, at Chaoyang Sports Centre on 15 August.

== Medalists ==
Gold	Xue Fei; China
Silver	Florence Kiplagat; Kenya
Bronze	Mary Ngugi; Kenya

== Results ==
=== Final ===
15 August

Rank	Name	Nationality	Time	Notes
1st place, gold medalist(s)	Xue Fei	China	15:31.61	
2nd place, silver medalist(s)	Florence Kiplagat	Kenya	15:32.34	
3rd place, bronze medalist(s)	Mary Ngugi	Kenya	15:36.82	
4	Bai Xue	China	15:37.12	
5	Wude Ayalew	Ethiopia	15:41.63	
6	Sian Edwards	United Kingdom	15:47.87	
7	Workitu Ayanu	Ethiopia	15:50.89	
8	Farida Makula	Tanzania	16:07.24	
9	Nami Matsuda	Japan	16:09.63	
10	Rina Yamazaki	Japan	16:33.02	
11	Natalya Starkova	Russia	16:39.19	
12	Svetlana Kudelich	Belarus	17:00.03	
13	María Sánchez	Spain	17:41.78	

== Participation ==
According to an unofficial count, 13 athletes from 9 countries participated in the event.

- Belarus (1)
- China (2)
- Ethiopia (2)
- Japan (2)
- Kenya (2)
- Russia (1)
- Spain (1)
- Tanzania (1)
- United Kingdom (1)
