= Adil Kaouch =

Moroccan middle-distance runner

Medal record

Men's athletics

Representing Morocco

World Championships
| Silver medal – second place | 2005 Helsinki | 1500 m |

African Championships
| Silver medal – second place | 1998 Dakar | 1500 m |
| Silver medal – second place | 2000 Algiers | 1500 m |
| Silver medal – second place | 2006 Bambous | 1500 m |

Mediterranean Games
| Silver medal – second place | 2005 Almería | 1500 m |

Adil Kaouch (Arabic: عادل الكوش) (born 1 January 1979) is a Moroccan middle-distance runner.

In 1998 he won the World Junior Championships over 1500 metres. The next year won a 5000 metres gold medal at the 1999 Pan Arab Games.

At the 1999 and 2001 World Championships, he took the role of setting a fast early pace to pull his teammate Hicham El Guerrouj away to victory.

At the 2000 Sydney Olympic he failed to advance from his heat in the 1500m, and Hicham El Guerrouj was eventually upset in a sprint finish by Kenyan Noah Ngeny. At this race, another Moroccan runner Youssef Baba set the pace for El Guerrouj.

At the 2004 Athens Olympic he finished 9th (3:38.26) at the 1500m final, where his compatriot Hicham El Guerrouj won the Olympics gold medal. At this race he did not run as a pacemaker for El Guerrouj, although he was expected to do so.

In August 2005 he won a 1500 metres silver medal at the World Championships.

In April 2006 he won the silver medal in the short race at the World Cross Country Championships, as well as a bronze medal in the team competition.

In 2007 Kaouch was issued with a two-year ban for a doping rule violation after failing a doping test.

== See also ==
- List of sportspeople sanctioned for doping offences
