= Takuya Fukatsu =

Japanese long-distance runner

Takuya Fukatsu (深津 卓也, Fukatsu Takuya; born November 10, 1987) is a Japanese long-distance runner.

He competed in the 2006 (junior) and 2007 (senior) IAAF World Cross Country Championships.

He finished seventh at the 2016 Chicago Marathon. He was the top non-African finisher.
