= 2006 IAAF World Cross Country Championships =

Coordinates: 33°39′27″N 130°21′00″E

- Organisers: IAAF
- Edition: 34th
- Date: April 1/2
- Host city: Fukuoka, Kyushu, Japan
- Venue: Umi-no-nakamichi Seaside Park
- Events: 6
- Distances: 12 km – Senior men 4 km – Men's short 8 km – Junior men 8 km – Senior women 4 km – Women's short 6 km – Junior women
- Participation: 574 athletes from 59 nations

The 2006 IAAF World Cross Country Championships took place on April 1/2, 2006. The races were held at the Umi-no-nakamichi Seaside Park in Fukuoka, Japan, Japan's National Cross Country Course which is the permanent residence of the annual Fukuoka International Cross Country meeting.

The event was once again dominated by Ethiopian and Kenyan runners and also Eritrean runners. Kenenisa Bekele won both men's individual races, proving himself the most successful Cross country runner. Reports of the event were given in The New York Times, and for the IAAF.

Complete results for senior men, for senior men's teams, for men's short race, for men's short race teams, for junior men, for junior men's teams, senior women, for senior women's teams, for women's short race, for women's short race teams, for junior women, for junior women's teams, medallists, and the results of British athletes who took part were published.

== Medallists ==
Event	Gold		Silver		Bronze	
Individual
Senior men (12 km)	Kenenisa Bekele; Ethiopia	35:40	Sileshi Sihine; Ethiopia	35:43	Martin Mathathi; Kenya	35:44
Men's short (4 km)	Kenenisa Bekele; Ethiopia	10:54	Isaac Songok; Kenya	10:55	Adil Kaouch; Morocco	10:57
Junior men (8 km)	Mang'ata Ndiwa; Kenya	23:53	Leonard Patrick Komon; Kenya	23:54	Tariku Bekele; Ethiopia	23:56
Senior women (8 km)	Tirunesh Dibaba; Ethiopia	25:21	Lornah Kiplagat; Netherlands	25:26	Meselech Melkamu; Ethiopia	25:38
Women's short (4 km)	Gelete Burka; Ethiopia	12:51	Prisca Ngetich; Kenya	12:53	Meselech Melkamu; Ethiopia	12:54
Junior women (6 km)	Pauline Korikwiang; Kenya	19:27	Veronica Wanjiru; Kenya	19:27	Mercy Kosgei; Kenya	19:45
Team
Senior men	Kenya	24	Eritrea	28	Ethiopia	42
Men's short	Kenya	21	Ethiopia	48	Morocco	53
Junior men	Kenya	16	Ethiopia	24	Eritrea	44
Senior women	Ethiopia	16	Kenya	39	Japan	80
Women's short	Ethiopia	25	Kenya	26	Australia	69
Junior women	Kenya	10	Ethiopia	29	Japan	58

== Race results ==
=== Senior men's race (12 km) ===
Kenenisa Bekele took his fifth consecutive long race title. At the team competition Eritrea surprisingly beat Ethiopia and lost to Kenya only by four points.

Individual race
Rank	Athlete	Country	Time
1st place, gold medalist(s)	Kenenisa Bekele	Ethiopia	35:40
2nd place, silver medalist(s)	Sileshi Sihine	Ethiopia	35:43
3rd place, bronze medalist(s)	Martin Mathathi	Kenya	35:44
4	Zersenay Tadesse	Eritrea	35:47
5	Mike Kigen	Kenya	35:54
6	Hosea Macharinyang	Kenya	36:02
7	Yonas Kifle	Eritrea	36:05
8	Ali Abdalla	Eritrea	36:18
9	Tesfayohannes Mesfen	Eritrea	36:18
10	Simon Arusei	Kenya	36:18
11	Abderrahim Goumri	Morocco	36:20
12	John Kibowen	Kenya	36:21
Full results

Teams
Rank	Team	Points
1st place, gold medalist(s)	Kenya: Martin Mathathi / 3; Mike Kigen / 5; Hosea Macharinyang / 6; Simon Arusei / 10; (John Kibowen) / (12); (Simion Tuitoek) / (58)	24
2nd place, silver medalist(s)	Eritrea: Zersenay Tadesse / 4; Yonas Kifle / 7; Ali Abdalla / 8; Tesfayohannes Mesfen / 9; (Samson Kiflemariam) / (19)	28
3rd place, bronze medalist(s)	Ethiopia: Kenenisa Bekele / 1; Sileshi Sihine / 2; Gebre-egziabher Gebremariam / 13; Ketema Nigusse / 26; (Eshetu Gezhagne) / (31); (Abebe Dinkessa) / (71)	42
4	Morocco	62
5	Uganda	102
6	Qatar	116
7	Portugal	152
8	Japan	171
Full results

- Note: Athletes in parentheses did not score for the team result.

=== Men's short race (4 km) ===
Kenenisa Bekele took his fifth consecutive short race title. The 1999 winner, Benjamin Limo of Kenya finished fourth.

Individual race
Rank	Athlete	Country	Time
1st place, gold medalist(s)	Kenenisa Bekele	Ethiopia	10:54
2nd place, silver medalist(s)	Isaac Songok	Kenya	10:55
3rd place, bronze medalist(s)	Adil Kaouch	Morocco	10:57
4	Benjamin Limo	Kenya	11:00
5	Ali Abdosh	Ethiopia	11:01
6	Adam Goucher	United States	11:02
7	Augustine Choge	Kenya	11:03
8	Edwin Cheruiyot Soi	Kenya	11:06
9	Saif Saeed Shaheen	Qatar	11:08
10	Sultan Khamis Zaman	Qatar	11:08
11	Craig Mottram	Australia	11:10
12	Sileshi Sihine	Ethiopia	11:12
Full results

Teams
Rank	Team	Points
1st place, gold medalist(s)	Kenya: Isaac Songok / 2; Benjamin Limo / 4; Augustine Choge / 7; Edwin Cheruiyot Soi / 8; (Brimin Kipruto) / (18); (Yusuf Kibet Biwot) / (20)	21
2nd place, silver medalist(s)	Ethiopia: Kenenisa Bekele / 1; Ali Abdosh / 5; Sileshi Sihine / 12; Gebre-egziabher Gebremariam / 30; (Abebe Dinkessa) / (39); (Zenbaba Yegezu) / (48)	48
3rd place, bronze medalist(s)	Morocco: Adil Kaouch / 3; Hicham Bellani / 14; Khalid El Amri / 15; Hamid Ezzine / 21; (Anis Selmouni) / (47)	53
4	Qatar	66
5	United States	80
6	Spain	140
7	Uganda	142
8	Algeria	158
Full results

- Note: Athletes in parentheses did not score for the team result.

=== Junior men's race (8 km) ===
Individual race
Rank	Athlete	Country	Time
1st place, gold medalist(s)	Mang'ata Ndiwa	Kenya	23:53
2nd place, silver medalist(s)	Leonard Patrick Komon	Kenya	23:54
3rd place, bronze medalist(s)	Tariku Bekele	Ethiopia	23:56
4	Joseph Ebuya	Kenya	23:59
5	Ibrahim Jellan	Ethiopia	24:04
6	Habtamu Fikadu	Ethiopia	24:04
7	Kamal Ali Thamer	Qatar	24:05
8	Samuel Tsegay	Eritrea	24:06
9	Bernard Matheka	Kenya	24:08
10	Tadesse Tola	Ethiopia	24:09
11	Kidane Tadasse	Eritrea	24:21
12	Kiflom Slum	Eritrea	24:22
Full results

Teams
Rank	Team	Points
1st place, gold medalist(s)	Kenya: Mang'ata Ndiwa / 1; Leonard Patrick Komon / 2; Joseph Ebuya / 4; Bernard Matheka / 9; (Daniel Gitau) / (15)	16
2nd place, silver medalist(s)	Ethiopia: Tariku Bekele / 3; Ibrahim Jellan / 5; Habtamu Fikadu / 6; Tadesse Tola / 10; (Demssew Tsega) / (16)	24
3rd place, bronze medalist(s)	Eritrea: Samuel Tsegay / 8; Kidane Tadasse / 11; Kiflom Slum / 12; Teklemariam Medhin / 13	44
4	Uganda	80
5	Qatar	83
6	Bahrain	101
7	Japan	110
8	Morocco	124
Full results

- Note: Athletes in parentheses did not score for the team result.

=== Senior women's race (8 km) ===
Tirunesh Dibaba took her second consecutive long race title.

Individual race
Rank	Athlete	Country	Time
1st place, gold medalist(s)	Tirunesh Dibaba	Ethiopia	25:21
2nd place, silver medalist(s)	Lornah Kiplagat	Netherlands	25:26
3rd place, bronze medalist(s)	Meselech Melkamu	Ethiopia	25:38
4	Benita Johnson	Australia	25:43
5	Wude Ayalew	Ethiopia	25:47
6	Kayoko Fukushi	Japan	25:51
7	Mestawat Tufa	Ethiopia	25:59
8	Evelyne Wambui	Kenya	26:11
9	Faith Jemutai	Kenya	26:12
10	Alice Chelangat	Kenya	26:13
11	Blake Russell	United States	26:23
12	Mercy Njoroge	Kenya	26:26
Full results

Teams
Rank	Team	Points
1st place, gold medalist(s)	Ethiopia: Tirunesh Dibaba / 1; Meselech Melkamu / 3; Wude Ayalew / 5; Mestawat Tufa / 7; (Ejagayehu Dibaba) / (14); (Teyiba Erkesso) / (46)	16
2nd place, silver medalist(s)	Kenya: Evelyne Wambui / 8; Faith Jemutai / 9; Alice Chelangat / 10; Mercy Njoroge / 12; (Edna Kiplagat) / (13); (Consalater Chemtai Yadaa) / (58)	39
3rd place, bronze medalist(s)	Japan: Kayoko Fukushi / 6; Yoshimi Ozaki / 19; Megumi Oshima / 25; Yumi Sato / 30; (Kayo Sugihara) / (50); (Michiko Ogawa) / (65)	80
4	Australia	87
5	United States	91
6	New Zealand	112
7	United Kingdom	134
8	China	141
Full results

- Note: Athletes in parentheses did not score for the team result.

=== Women's short race (4 km) ===
Ethiopia won the team competition beating Kenya only by a single point.

Individual race
Rank	Athlete	Country	Time
1st place, gold medalist(s)	Gelete Burka	Ethiopia	12:51
2nd place, silver medalist(s)	Prisca Ngetich	Kenya	12:53
3rd place, bronze medalist(s)	Meselech Melkamu	Ethiopia	12:54
4	Benita Johnson	Australia	12:55
5	Lornah Kiplagat	Netherlands	12:55
6	Beatrice Chepchumba	Kenya	12:58
7	Zhor El Kamch	Morocco	13:03
8	Vivian Cheruiyot	Kenya	13:10
9	Bezunesh Bekele	Ethiopia	13:10
10	Isabella Ochichi	Kenya	13:11
11	Melissa Rollison	Australia	13:11
12	Teyiba Erkesso	Ethiopia	13:12
Full results

Teams
Rank	Team	Points
1st place, gold medalist(s)	Ethiopia: Gelete Burka / 1; Meselech Melkamu / 3; Bezunesh Bekele / 9; Teyiba Erkesso / 12; (Etalemahu Kidane) / (13); (Tirunesh Dibaba) / (DNF)	25
2nd place, silver medalist(s)	Kenya: Prisca Ngetich / 2; Beatrice Chepchumba / 6; Vivian Cheruiyot / 8; Isabella Ochichi / 10; (Nancy Wambui) / (14); (Beatrice Rutto) / (41)	26
3rd place, bronze medalist(s)	Australia: Benita Johnson / 4; Melissa Rollison / 11; Anna Thompson / 25; Donna MacFarlane / 29; (Victoria Mitchell) / (33); (Eloise Wellings) / (39)	69
4	Morocco	73
5	United States	99
6	Russia	102
7	Canada	115
8	China	156
Full results

- Note: Athletes in parentheses did not score for the team result.

=== Junior women's race (6 km) ===
Individual race
Rank	Athlete	Country	Time
1st place, gold medalist(s)	Pauline Korikwiang	Kenya	19:27
2nd place, silver medalist(s)	Veronica Wanjiru	Kenya	19:27
3rd place, bronze medalist(s)	Mercy Kosgei	Kenya	19:45
4	Emmy Chepkirui	Kenya	19:52
5	Belainesh Zemedkun	Ethiopia	19:56
6	Workitu Ayanu	Ethiopia	19:57
7	Emebt Etea	Ethiopia	20:05
8	Pamela Chesopich Lisoreng	Kenya	20:06
9	Gladys Chemweno	Kenya	20:09
10	Sian Edwards	United Kingdom	20:10
11	Asselefech Assefa	Ethiopia	20:22
12	Merat Bahta	Eritrea	20:22
Full results

Teams
Rank	Team	Points
1st place, gold medalist(s)	Kenya: Pauline Korikwiang / 1; Veronica Wanjiru / 2; Mercy Kosgei / 3; Emmy Chepkirui / 4; (Pamela Chesopich Lisoreng) / (8); (Gladys Chemweno) / (9)	10
2nd place, silver medalist(s)	Ethiopia: Belainesh Zemedkun / 5; Workitu Ayanu / 6; Emebt Etea / 7; Asselefech Assefa / 11; (Derebe Godan) / (21)	29
3rd place, bronze medalist(s)	Japan: Hitomi Niiya / 13; Megumi Kinukawa / 14; Kazue Kojima / 15; Yuko Nohara / 16; (Chisato Ozaki) / (17); (Aimi Horikoshi) / (23)	58
4	Eritrea	81
5	United Kingdom	113
6	United States	142
7	Morocco	142
8	Australia	158
Full results

- Note: Athletes in parentheses did not score for the team result.

== Medal table (unofficial) ==
* Host nation (Japan)

Rank	Nation	Gold	Silver	Bronze	Total
1	Kenya	6	6	2	14
2	Ethiopia	6	4	4	14
3	Eritrea	0	1	1	2
4	Netherlands	0	1	0	1
5	Japan	0	0	2	2
5	Morocco	0	0	2	2
7	Australia	0	0	1	1
Totals (7 entries)		12	12	12	36

- Note: Totals include both individual and team medals, with medals in the team competition counting as one medal.

== Participation ==
According to an unofficial count, 574 athletes from 59 countries participated. This is in agreement with the official numbers as published. The announced athlete from Equatorial Guinea did not show.

- Algeria (18)
- Angola (4)
- Argentina (4)
- Australia (21)
- Azerbaijan (1)
- Bahrain (9)
- Belarus (4)
- Bolivia (1)
- Botswana (4)
- Brazil (9)
- Burundi (5)
- Canada (28)
- Chile (4)
- China (12)
- Colombia (1)
- Côte d'Ivoire (2)
- Dominican Republic (3)
- Egypt (4)
- Eritrea (19)
- Ethiopia (27)
- France (12)
- Germany (1)
- Guatemala (3)
- India (3)
- Indonesia (3)
- Iran (1)
- Ireland (4)
- Italy (15)
- Jamaica (10)
- Japan (36)
- Kazakhstan (4)
- Kenya (36)
- Kyrgyzstan (2)
- Mexico (8)
- Morocco (28)
- Netherlands (1)
- New Zealand (9)
- Peru (5)
- Poland (4)
- Portugal (17)
- Puerto Rico (2)
- Qatar (14)
- Romania (2)
- Russia (10)
- Rwanda (12)
- Seychelles (1)
- South Africa (18)
- South Korea (8)
- Spain (22)
- Sri Lanka (2)
- Switzerland (3)
- Tajikistan (3)
- Tanzania (4)
- Turkey (1)
- Uganda (13)
- United Kingdom (31)
- United States (34)
- Uzbekistan (8)
- Venezuela (4)

== See also ==
- 2006 IAAF World Cross Country Championships – Senior men's race
- 2006 IAAF World Cross Country Championships – Men's short race
- 2006 IAAF World Cross Country Championships – Junior men's race
- 2006 IAAF World Cross Country Championships – Senior women's race
- 2006 IAAF World Cross Country Championships – Women's short race
- 2006 IAAF World Cross Country Championships – Junior women's race
- 2006 in athletics (track and field)
