= Evelyne Nganga =

Kenyan long-distance runner

Evelyne Wambui Nganga (born 4 April 1986) is a Kenyan long-distance runner who specializes in the 10,000 metres.

In 2006, she won the silver medal in the 10,000 metres at the Commonwealth Games in March. In April she participated at the World Cross Country Championships, where she finished eighth in the long race and won a silver medal in the team competition. In the next year she finished 19th at the 2007 World Championships.

Her personal best times are 8:49.39 minutes in the 3000 metres, achieved in October 2006 in Fukuroi; 15:06.74 minutes in the 5000 metres, achieved in October 2005 in Kobe; and 31:14.08 minutes in the 10,000 metres, achieved in September 2008 in Tendo.
