= Ali Abdalla =

Eritrean long-distance runner

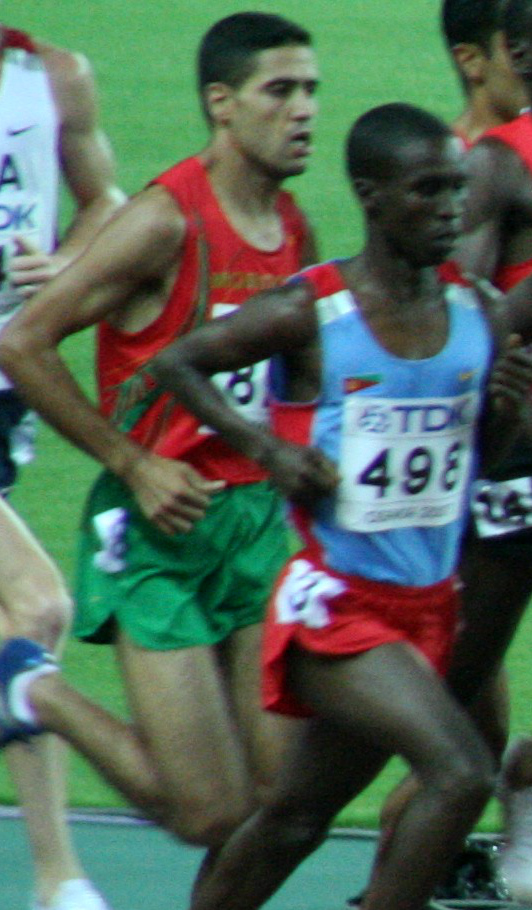
Ali Abdalla (right) in 2007

Ali Abdallah Avelino (born 2 November 1982 in Mariti) is an Eritrean long-distance runner.

He finished twelfth in 5000 metres at the 2002 African Championships. At the 2006 World Cross Country Championships he finished eighth in the long race, while the Eritrean team, of which Abdallah was a part, won the silver medal in the team competition. Abdallah participated in the 2008 Summer Olympics. He was eliminated in the first round of the 5000 metre event, finishing fifth in his heat.

== Personal bests ==
- 3000 metres - 7:44.32 min (2006)
- 5000 metres - 13:10.71 min (2006)
- 10,000 metres - 29:27.10 min (2001)
