= Simon Arusei =

Kenyan long-distance runner

Simon Koros Arusei (born 4 November 1977, in Eldoret) is a Kenyan long-distance runner.

At the 2006 World Cross Country Championships he finished tenth in the long race. The Kenyan team, of which Arusei was a part, won the team competition.

== Personal bests ==
- 3000 metres - 7:57.88 min (2006)
- 5000 metres - 13:22.76 min (2006)
- 10,000 metres - 27:22.01 min (2006)
