= Blake Russell =

American long-distance runner

Personal information
- Born: July 24, 1975 (age 51) Winston-Salem, North Carolina, United States

Sport
- Sport: Track and field
Medal record
Representing United States
Pan American Games
Bronze medal – third place	1999 Winnipeg	5000m

Blake Russell (née Phillips; born July 24, 1975) is an American long-distance runner who represented her country at the 2008 Beijing Olympics. After finishing third in the marathon at the 2008 U.S. Olympic Team Trials, she went on to finish 27th in the Olympic marathon in Beijing. She was the only American woman to finish the marathon at the 2008 Summer Olympics. She is a many time USA National Champion in Cross Country and the USA Road Racing Circuit over various distances.

== Early career and education ==
A high-school standout in North Carolina, Russell won 11 Independent School State Titles in the 800, mile, and 2 mile. She walked onto the University of North Carolina at Chapel Hill team in 1993 and eventually earned All-American Honors and ACC Championship titles in the 1500m and 5000m her senior year. She set the school record in the 1500 meters went on to place 13th in the NCAA Track and Field Championships. She met her husband Jonathan Russell, an All-American runner at Wake Forest University while at the NCAA meet.

While attending Elon University for Physical Therapy, Russell continued to train and qualified for the Olympic Trials, not in the marathon, but in the 10,000m by having met the 10,000m standard of 33:00. In 2000, she ran 32:17 in her first 10,000 meters at Mt. Sac and 15:21 at Penn Relays to qualify her for the 2000 Olympic Track and field trials. She went on the place 7th and 11th, respectively. After the 2000 Olympic Trials, she and her husband moved to Boston to work with famed Coach Robert Sevene and worked full-time as a physical therapist at Spaulding Rehabilitation Center in Medford, MA.

== Track and marathon career ==
Russell decided to run her first marathon on a whim and was the surprise winner of the Twin Cities Marathon in 2003. Her time of 2:30:41 was the 3rd fastest debut by an American at the time and qualified her for the 2004 Olympic Trials in St. Louis, MO. After leading much of the race, she faded to 4th place, just missing a spot on the Olympic Team. Deciding to focus on running full-time, Russell and her husband followed her Coach Robert Sevene to Marina, CA. During the next few years Russell set most of her personal bests in events ranging from the 1500 meters to the marathon. She participated at the 2005 World Championships in Athletics, running in the 10,000 meters and finished in 22nd place. She was on the Bronze Medal 4k 2005 IAAF Cross Country Team in St. Etienne, France. She was 7th at the Chicago Marathon in 2005, setting her personal best of 2:29:10. She won the 8k National Cross Country Title in 2006. She went on to be the top American finisher at the IAAF Cross Country Championships in Fukuoka, Japan placing 11th in the 8k and 18th in the 4k. She was also National 15k and 20k Champion.

After the 2008 Olympics she had a son and made a successful return to the track placing 4th in the 10,000 meters at the USA Track and Field Championships and winning road running the San Jose Half Marathon, crossing the line in 1:11:55 – over a minute ahead of her closest competitor Linda Somers. She DNFed the Boston marathon in 2011.

== Personal life ==
Blake had her second child in March 2013.

She is originally from Winston-Salem, North Carolina and currently residing in Pacific Grove, California. She holds a Master's degree in Physical Therapy from Elon University.

== Achievements ==
Year	Competition	Venue	Position	Event	Notes
Representing the United States
2003	Twin Cities Marathon	Minneapolis, United States	1st	Marathon	2:30:41
2008	Olympic Games	Beijing, PR China	27th	Marathon	2:33:13
2015	Los Angeles Marathon	Los Angeles, California, United States	3rd	Marathon	2:34:57
