= Hamid Ezzine =

Moroccan long-distance runner

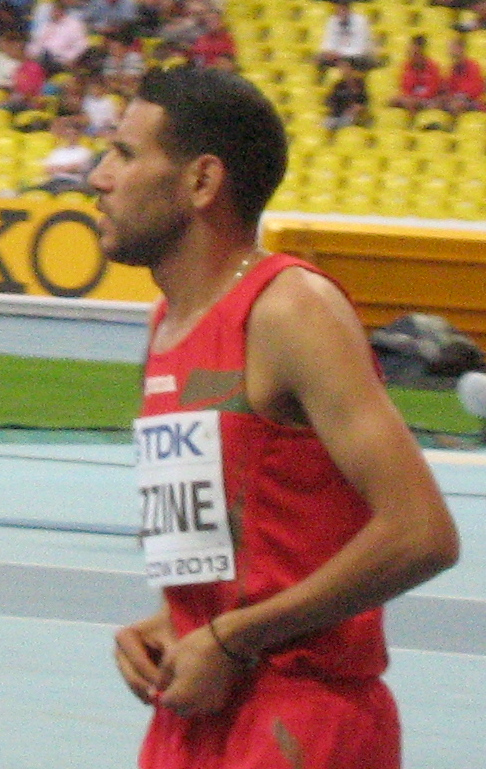
- Ezzine at the 2013 World Championships

Personal information
- Born: 5 October 1983 (age 43) Aït Ali, Morocco
- Education: Al Akhawayn University
- Height: 174 cm (5 ft 9 in)
- Weight: 62 kg (137 lb)

Sport
- Sport: Athletics
- Event: steeplechase
- Club: FATH Union Sports, Rabat
- Coached by: Ayachi Amekdouf; Ahmed Ettanani; Abdellah Boukraa; Lahlou Benyounes; Mohamed Nouami

Achievements and titles
- Personal best: 3000 mS – 8:09.72 (2007)
Medal record
Representing Morocco
World Cross Country Championships
Bronze medal – third place	Fukuoka 2006	Short race – Team
Mediterranean Games
Bronze medal – third place	Mersin 2013	3000 m steeplechase

Hamid Ezzine (born 5 October 1983) is a Moroccan long-distance runner who specialized in the 3000 metres steeplechase. He is a younger brother of the Olympic runner Ali Ezzine.

== Career ==
He finished twelfth in the 5000 metres at the 2002 World Junior Championships, but then turned to the steeplechase. He finished fourth at the 2004 African Championships, won the gold medal at the 2005 Jeux de la Francophonie, finished fifth at the 2006 African Championships and eleventh at the 2007 World Athletics Final. Ezzine also competed at the 2005 World Championships, the 2007 World Championships and the 2008 Olympic Games without reaching the final.

His personal best time in the steeplechase is 8:09.72 minutes, achieved in July 2007 in Athens Olympic Stadium. Up until then he had improved steadily from 8:47.67 minutes in 2003 (August, Casablanca) to 8:25.10 in 2004 (June, Rabat), 8:21.38 in 2005 (June, Rabat) and 8:19.37 in 2006 (June, Rabat). In late 2007, Ezzine was described in the official IAAF season reviews as one of that year's major breakthroughs statistically. His personal best in the 5000 metres is 14:00.6 minutes, achieved in June 2002 in Rabat.

Ezzine also finished 30th at the 2004 World Cross Country Championships, 41st at the 2005 World Cross Country Championships and 21st at the 2006 World Cross Country Championships, all in the short race. This earned him a fifth place in the team competition of 2004 and a bronze medal in the team competition of 2006.

In 2009, he was found guilty of refusal to submit to doping control and tampering with a doping control. He was suspended from the sport for two year, from March 2009 to March 2011. He returned to competition in late 2011 to win the silver medal in 3000 m steeplechase at the 2011 Pan Arab Games. That year he also competed at the World Championships in Daegu, finishing 9th in the final. He reached the Olympic final in 2012, finishing in seventh place. At the 2013 World Championships, he again finished 9th.
