= Nina Rillstone =

New Zealand long-distance and marathon runner

Personal information
- Full name: Nina Kathy Rillstone
- Nationality: New Zealand
- Born: 15 April 1975 (age 51) Brentwood, Essex
- Height: 1.68 m (5 ft 6 in)
- Weight: 45 kg (99 lb)

Sport
- Sport: Athletics
- Event: Marathon
- Club: Pakuranga Athletics Club (NZL)
- Coached by: John Bowden

Achievements and titles
- Personal bests: Marathon – 2:29:46; Half-marathon – 1:10:49

Nina Kathy Rillstone (born April 15, 1975, in Brentwood, Essex) is a New Zealand long-distance and marathon runner. She is a national champion in both middle and long-distance running, and a national record holder for the half-marathon.

She set her personal best for the Half Marathon of 1:13:03 at the 2005 IAAF World Half Marathon Championships in Edmonton, Alberta, Canada. Her personal best in the marathon came during the Nagano Marathon in 2006, with a time of 2:29:46. Rillstone set a national record for the marathon at the 2007 IAAF World Championships in Osaka, Japan, with a time of 2:33:58, finishing in thirteenth place.

Rillstone represented New Zealand for the 2008 Summer Olympics in Beijing, and competed in the women's marathon. She ran and finished the race in sixteenth place, with a best possible time of 2:31:16, nearly two minutes short of her personal best set in Nagano.
