= Megumi Oshima =

Japanese long-distance runner

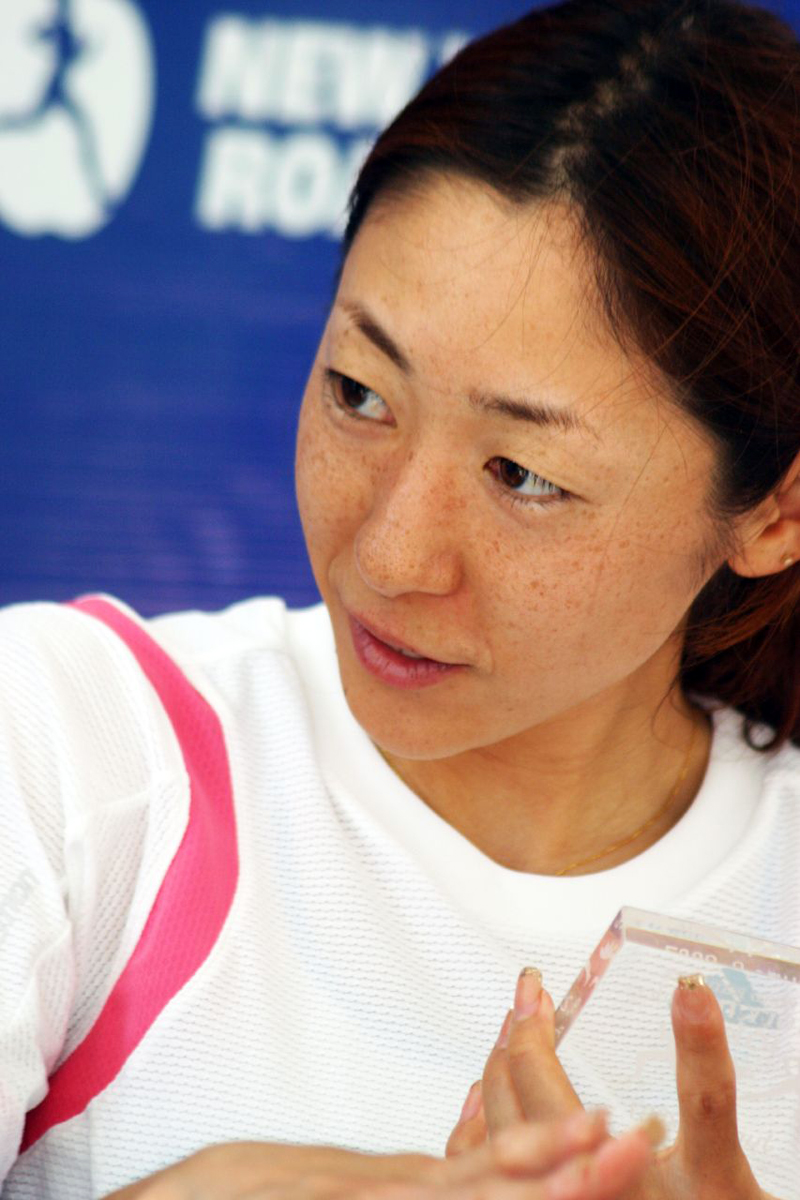
- Megumi Oshima

Medal record

Women's athletics

Representing Japan

Asian Championships
Bronze medal – third place	1998 Fukuoka	5000 m

Megumi Oshima (大島 めぐみ, Ōshima Megumi), née Tanaka (田中) (born 4 September 1975 in Kumagaya, Saitama) is a Japanese long-distance runner, who specializes in the 10,000 metres and the marathon race.

== Achievements ==
Year	Competition	Venue	Position	Notes
Representing Japan
1998	Asian Championships	Fukuoka, Japan	3rd	5000 m
1999	World Championships	Sevilla, Spain	10th	5000 m
2003	World Championships	Paris, France	15th	10,000 m
2004	Olympic Games	Athens, Greece	13th	10,000 m
2005	World Championships	Helsinki, Finland	10th	Marathon
2006	World Cross Country Championships	Fukuoka, Japan	3rd	Long race, team

=== Personal bests ===
- 5000 metres - 15:17.92 min (1999)
- 10,000 metres - 31:34.01 min (2004)
- Half marathon - 1:09:59 hrs (2005)
- Marathon - 2:24:25 hrs (2005)
