= Daniel Lincoln (runner) =

American track and field athlete

Daniel Lincoln (born October 22, 1980, in Ruston, Louisiana) is a former world-class American track and field athlete and the former American record holder in the 3000 meter steeplechase.

== Education ==
In 1998, Lincoln graduated from the Arkansas School for Mathematics and Sciences located in Hot Springs, Arkansas. The same year, he also attained the rank of Eagle Scout from the Boy Scouts of America.

Lincoln accepted the Chancellor's Scholarship, a full academic scholarship, to the University of Arkansas where, in 2002, he received a BS in chemistry with a focus in biochemistry and a minor in mathematics. In 2004, he received his MS in biochemistry from Arkansas. He completed his thesis on the structure of xyloglucanase 74.

In 2002, Lincoln was accepted to the University of Arkansas Medical School located in Little Rock, Arkansas. He began medical school in 2005 where he is pursuing his MD with an anticipated graduation date in 2010.

In 2008, Lincoln co-authored an academic research paper with Dr. C. Lowry Barnes which was accepted for presentation at the Mid-America Orthopedic Association 23rd annual meeting located at Amelia Island, FL in April 2009.

Lincoln has completed Internal Medicine residency and is now a Critical Care Medicine Fellow at Oregon Health and Science University.

== Collegiate career ==
Lincoln ran collegiately for the University of Arkansas where he added the steeplechase to array of long distance events in which he competed, earning 14 All-American honors. During his time at Arkansas, he won the steeplechase in the 2001, 2002 and 2003 NCAA Outdoor Championships as well as the 10,000 meter run in 2003 (barely edging teammate and future Irish Olympian Alistair Cragg). Following his final season in 2003, Lincoln was named the NCAA Division I National Scholar Athlete of the Year by the US Track Coaches Association. and Collegiate Athlete of the Year by Track and Field News magazine.

== Professional career ==
In 2004, Lincoln won the steeplechase at the US Olympic Trials, eventually coming in 11th in the event at the Athens Olympics. He finished the year ranked first in the US in both the steeplechase and the 10,000 meter run by Track and Field News.

Lincoln won the steeplechase at the USATF National Outdoor Championships in 2005 and 2006, the last year while attending medical school full-time. He was ranked number 1 in the US by Track and Field News in both those years as well. During 2006, he was ranked number 8 in the world in the event by the publication.

On August 11, 2006, Lincoln broke the 21-year-old 3,000-meter steeplechase American record of Henry Marsh by running a time of 8:08.82 at the Golden Gala in Rome, Italy. That year, he was recognized by the USATF with the Robert E. DeCelle, Jr., Award as the top US male long distance runner.

Lincoln now bicycles competitively, representing [HCH-RPM Mortgage], while working as a doctor.

== Cycling ==
In 2017, Lincoln won all three events of the High Desert Omnium in Bend, OR, securing the overall victory. Later that year he dominated the hill climb state championships to win the title.
