= Wilson Busienei =

Ugandan long-distance runner

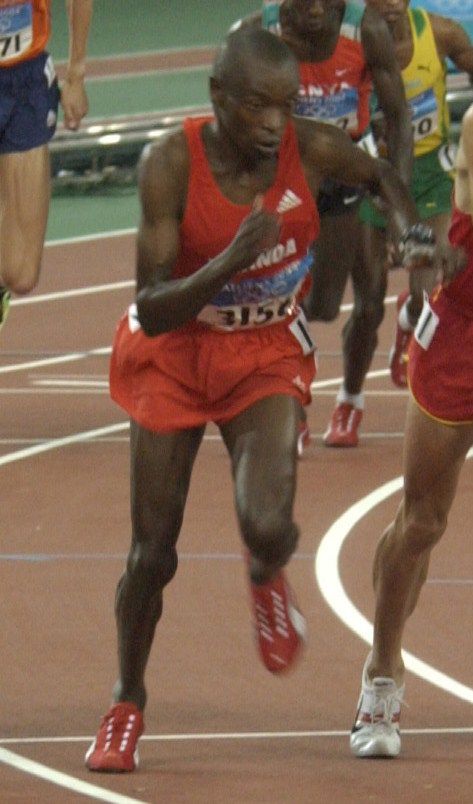
- Busienei at the 2004 Olympic Games

Personal information
- Born: 18 August 1981 (age 44) Nakasongola, Uganda

Sport
- Sport: Track and field
Medal record
Representing Uganda
Summer Universiade
Gold medal – first place	2005 Izmir	5000m
Gold medal – first place	2005 Izmir	10,000m
Gold medal – first place	2005 Izmir	Half marathon

Wilson Kipkemei Busienei (born 18 August 1981) in Nakasongola district, central Uganda, is a Ugandan long-distance runner. He is best known for winning three gold medals at the 2005 Summer Universiade. He has represented his country at the World Championship level in cross country running and road running and on the track. He took part in the 2004 Summer Olympics, finishing eleventh in the 10,000 metres. Busienei has also competed at the Commonwealth Games, having taken fifth in the 10,000 m in 2006.

He ran at the 2010 Giro al Sas 10,000 m race in Italy in October and crossed the line after Edwin Soi to finish as runner-up.

== International competitions ==
Year	Competition	Venue	Position	Event	Notes
Representing Uganda
2003	Universiade	Daegu, South Korea	5th	10,000 m	
2004	Olympic Games	Athens, Greece	11th	10,000 m	
2004	World Half Marathon Championships	New Delhi, India	7th	Half marathon	
2005	Universiade	İzmir, Turkey	1st	5000 m	
2005	Universiade	İzmir, Turkey	1st	10,000 m	
2005	Universiade	İzmir, Turkey	1st	Half marathon	
2005	World Half Marathon Championships	Edmonton, Canada	14th	Half marathon	1:03:12
2006	Commonwealth Games	Melbourne, Australia	5th	10,000 m	
2006	World Cross Country Championships	Fukuoka, Japan	17th	Short race	
2006	World Cross Country Championships	Fukuoka, Japan	7th	Team	
2006	World Road Running Championships	Debrecen, Hungary	4th	20 km	
2007	World Cross Country Championships	Mombasa, Kenya	3rd	Team	

=== Personal bests ===
- 3000 metres – 7:46.62 min (2006)
- 5000 metres – 13:11.08 min (2006)
- 10,000 metres – 27:21.55 min (2006)
- Half marathon – 1:01:39 hrs (2005)
