= Workitu Ayanu =

Ethiopian long-distance runner

Workitu Ayanu Gurmu (born 19 April 1987, in Addis Ababa) is an Ethiopian runner who specializes in the 5000 metres.

Workitu started her career in the junior races at the IAAF World Cross Country Championships, finishing fourth in the junior women's race in 2004 and finishing sixth at both the 2005 and 2006 editions. She began running in road races in 2008 and she won the Egmond Half Marathon in 2009; her time of 1:16:33 was enough to beat Hilda Kibet to the finish line. She competed in the IAAF World Half Marathon Championships for the first time in 2009, and finished in 14th place overall. She ran a marathon personal best of 2:29:25 at the 2010 Paris Marathon, finishing in fifth place.

As the 2010 edition had been cancelled, she attempted to defend her title at the 2011 Egmond Half Marathon. She came close to repeating the feat but ended up in second place, three seconds behind fellow Ethiopian Abebech Afework. She was close to her best at the 2011 Rome City Marathon, recording a time of 2:29:37, which brought her sixth position overall.

== Achievements ==
Year	Competition	Venue	Position	Event	Notes
Representing Ethiopia
2006	World Junior Championships	Beijing, China	7th	5000 m	15:50.89
2007	All-Africa Games	Algiers, Algeria	6th	5000 m	15:33.27
2009	Egmond Half Marathon	Egmond, Netherlands	1st	Half Marathon	1:16:33

=== Personal bests ===
- 1500 metres – 4:19.03 min (2005)
- 3000 metres – 8:48.65 min (2006)
- 5000 metres – 14:50.15 min (2007)
- 10,000 metres – 31:59.94 min (2005)
- Half marathon – 1:10:13 hrs (2010)
- Marathon – 2:29:25 hrs (2010)
