= Giovanni Gualdi =

Italian long-distance runner

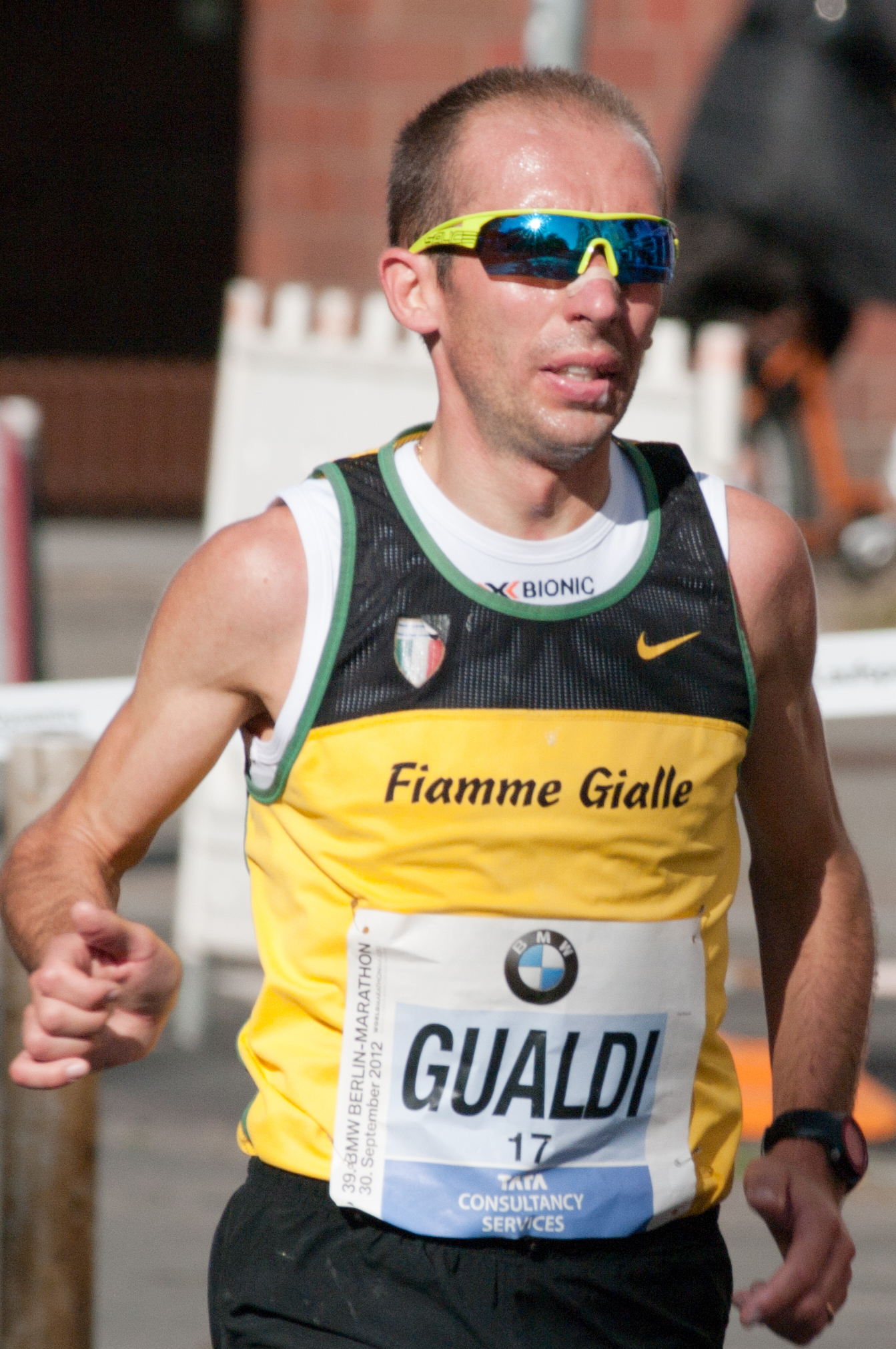
- Gualdi at the 2012 Berlin Marathon

Personal information
- Nationality: Italian
- Born: 25 November 1979 (age 46)

Sport
- Country: Italy
- Sport: Athletics
- Event(s): Long-distance running Marathon
- Club: G.S. Fiamme Gialle

Achievements and titles
- Personal bests: Half marathon: 1:04:28 (1999); Marathon: 2:13:39 (2010)

Giovanni Gualdi (born 25 November 1979) is a former Italian male long-distance runner who competed at three editions of the IAAF World Cross Country Championships at senior level (2000, 2005, 2006). He won one national championships at senior level (marathon: 2011).
