= Faith Chemutai =

Kenyan long-distance runner (born 1980)

Faith Chemutai (born 4 April 1980) is a Kenyan long-distance runner.

She won the silver medal in 5000 metres at the 1998 World Junior Championships. At the 2006 World Cross Country Championships she finished ninth in the long race. The Kenyan team, of which Chemutai was a part, won the silver medal in the team competition.

== Personal bests ==
- 5000 metres - 15:34.48 min (1998)
- Half marathon - 1:13:51 hrs (2005)
