= Fabio Cesari =

Italian long-distance runner

Personal information
- Nationality: Italian
- Born: 27 May 1977 (age 49)

Sport
- Country: Italy
- Sport: Athletics
- Event: Long-distance running

Achievements and titles
- Personal best: Half marathon: 1:04:56 (2003)

Fabio Cesari (born 27 May 1977) is a former Italian male long-distance runner who competed at one edition of the IAAF World Cross Country Championships at senior level (2006). He won one national championships at senior level (cross country running: 2006).
