= Dong Xiaoqin =

Chinese long-distance runner

Dong Xiaoqin (born 2 January 1983 in Lintao County) is a Chinese long-distance runner who specializes in the 10,000 metres.

She finished twenty-eighth in the 10,000 metres at the Olympic Games.

== Personal bests ==
- 5000 metres - 15:33.95 min (2007)
- 10,000 metres - 31:31.87 min (2008)
- Marathon - 2:39:43 hrs (2008)
