= Martin Dent =

Australian marathon runner

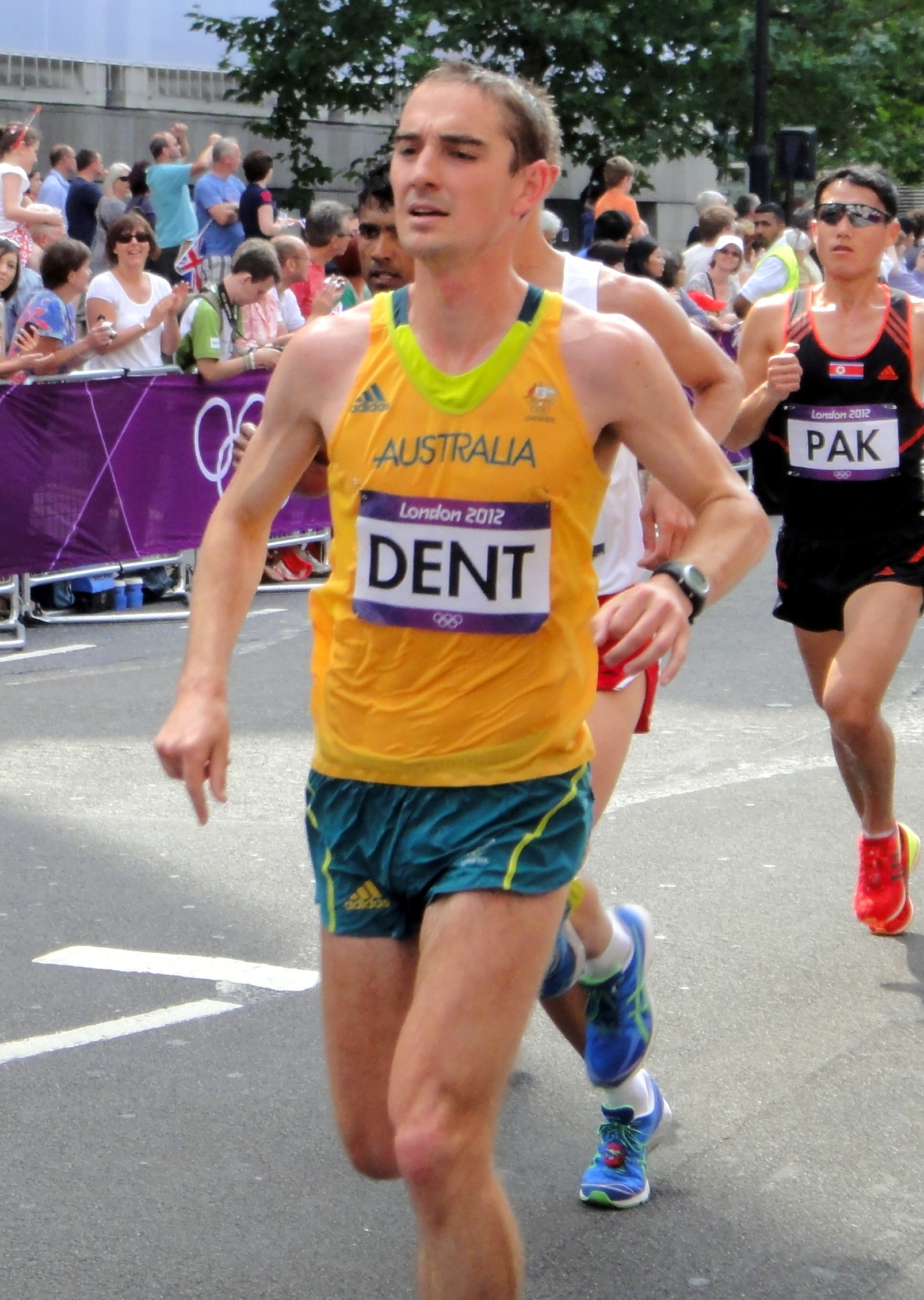
- Martin Dent in the marathon at the 2012 Olympics in London

Personal information
- Born: 8 February 1979 (age 47)
- Height: 1.8 m (5 ft 11 in)
- Weight: 69 kg (152 lb; 10 st 12 lb)

Sport
- Country: Australia
- Sport: Athletics
- Event: Marathon

Martin Dent (8 February 1979 in Woking, UK) is an English-born Australian Olympian marathon runner, who ran at the 2012 Summer Olympics. He made his season best time of 2 hours, 16 minutes and 29 seconds in the marathon in 28th place.

Dent attended Berkeley Vale Community High School on the Central Coast of New South Wales. This is the same school that produced Australia Rugby Union Wallaby star Adam Ashley-Cooper, The Entrance Cricket Club icon Michael Thorpe, Scottish and British Lions player Nathan Hines and NRL player and Wests Tigers Assistant Coach Paul Stringer, NRL player and current Dolphins assistant coach Rory Kostjasyn.

Dent was a member of Tuggerah Lakes Little Athletics Club, which at the time held their weekly competitions at Killarney Vale Public School. Dent held many state records in his time there, as well as many club records, many of which set in the early 1990s still stand today.

Dent currently holds the record for the fastest time on Fiordland's Kepler Challenge.
