= Luciano Di Pardo =

Italian long-distance runner

Personal information
- Nationality: Italian
- Born: 3 February 1975 (age 51) Bad Schwalbach, Germany

Sport
- Country: Italy
- Sport: Athletics
- Event(s): Long distance running Steeplechase

Achievements and titles
- Personal bests: 800 m: 1:48.76 (1997); 3000 m st: 8:17.32 (1999); 5000 m: 13:48.88 (1999)
Medal record
European Cross Country Championships
Silver medal – second place	2004 Heringsdorf	Team

Luciano Di Pardo (born 3 February 1975 in Bad Schwalbach, Germany) is an Italian long-distance runner.

== Biography ==
He finished sixteenth in the short race at the 1999 World Cross Country Championships and nineteenth at the 2002 World Cross Country Championships. He then finished eleventh in the 3000 metres steeplechase at the 2002 European Championships.

== National titles ==
Luciano Di Pardo has won 8 times the individual national championship.

- 3 wins on 5000 metres (1999)
- 2 wins on 3000 metres steeplechase (2000)
- 2 wins on cross country running (1998, 1999, 2000, 2003, 2004, 2005)

== See also ==
- 5000 metres winners of Italian Athletics Championships
