= Li Zhuhong =

Chinese long-distance runner

Li Zhuhong (李柱宏 Lǐ Zhùhóng, born 22 October 1983 in Zhuanglang, Gansu) is a Chinese long-distance runner who specializes in the marathon.

He won the 2002 Beijing Marathon. He competed at the 2004 Summer Olympics and the 2007 World Championships. He finished a disappointing 51st in the 2008 Summer Olympics with a time of 2:24:08.

== Achievements ==
Year	Competition	Venue	Position	Event	Notes
Representing China
2001	Beijing Marathon	Beijing, PR China	7th	Marathon	2:10:46
2002	Beijing Marathon	Beijing, PR China	1st	Marathon	2:13:09
2004	Olympic Games	Athens, Greece	31st	Marathon	2:19:26
2007	Xiamen International Marathon	Xiamen, PR China	1st	Marathon	2:13:17
2007	World Championships	Osaka, Japan	43rd	Marathon	2:32:44
2008	Olympic Games	Beijing, PR China	51st	Marathon	2:24:08

== Personal bests ==
- 5000 metres - 13:41.44 min (2001)
- 10,000 metres - 29:17.43 min (2001)
- Half marathon - 1:06:02 hrs (2002)
- Marathon - 2:10:46 hrs (2001)
