= Stefano Scaini =

Italian long-distance runner

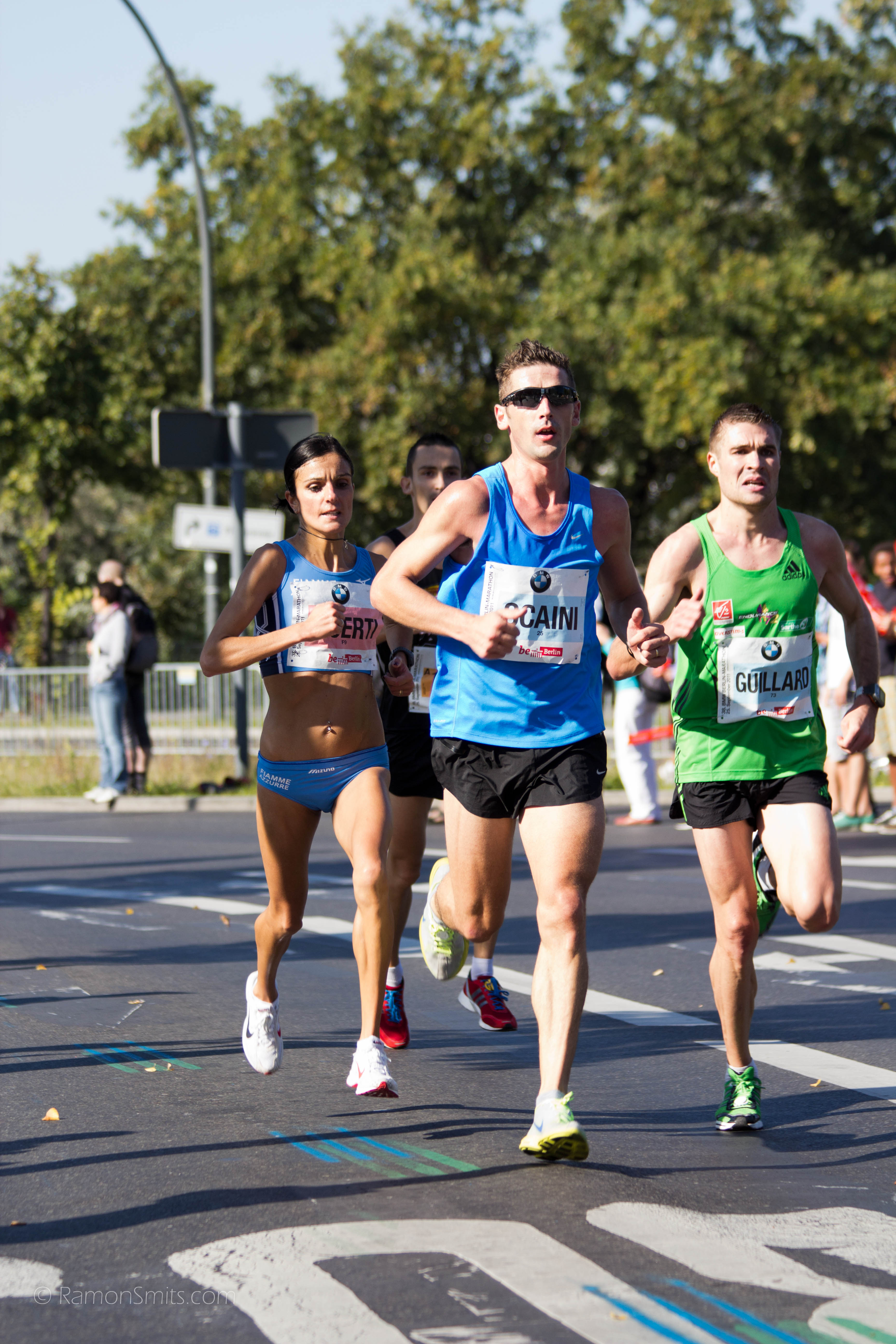
- Stefano Scaini trained his wife Anna Incerti (at his right) during 2011 Berlin Marathon

Personal information
- Nationality: Italian
- Born: 4 May 1983 (age 43)

Sport
- Country: Italy
- Sport: Athletics
- Event: Long-distance running

Achievements and titles
- Personal best: Half marathon: 1:04:14 (2008)
Medal record
European Cross Country Championships
Bronze medal – third place	2001 Thun	Junior race

Stefano Scaini (born 4 May 1983) is a former Italian male long-distance runner who competed at three editions of the IAAF World Cross Country Championships at senior level (2003, 2005, 2006). He is the husband of the marathon runner Anna Incerti.

== National titles ==
- Italian Athletics Championships
  - 10 km road: 2011
