= 2008 London Marathon =

Road running event in London, England

28th London Marathon
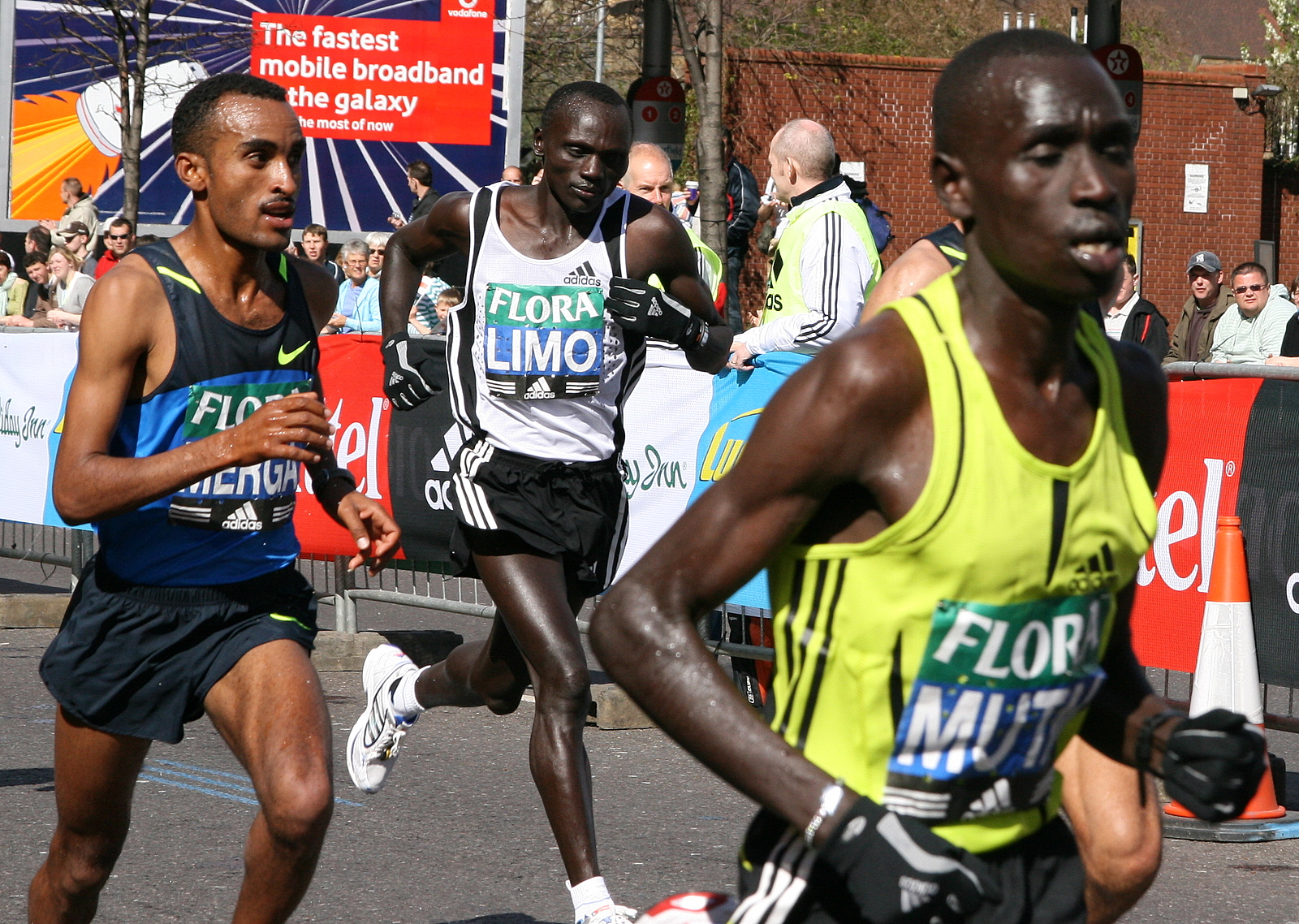
- Leaders during the men's race
- Venue: London, England
- Date: 13 April 2008

Champions
- Men: Martin Lel (2:05:15)
- Women: Irina Mikitenko (2:24:14)
- Wheelchair men: David Weir (1:33:56)
- Wheelchair women: Sandra Graf (1:48:04)

The 2008 London Marathon was the 28th running of the annual marathon race in London, England, which took place on Sunday, 13 April. The elite men's race was won by Kenya's Martin Lel in a time of 2:05:15 hours and the women's race was won by Germany's Irina Mikitenko in 2:24:14.

In the wheelchair races, Britain's David Weir (1:33:56) and Switzerland's Sandra Graf (1:48:04) won the men's and women's divisions, respectively. Graf knocked over a minute off the course record.

Around 120,000 people applied to enter the race: 48,630 had their applications accepted and 35,037 started the race. A total of 34,212 runners, 23,574 men and 10,638 women, finished the race.

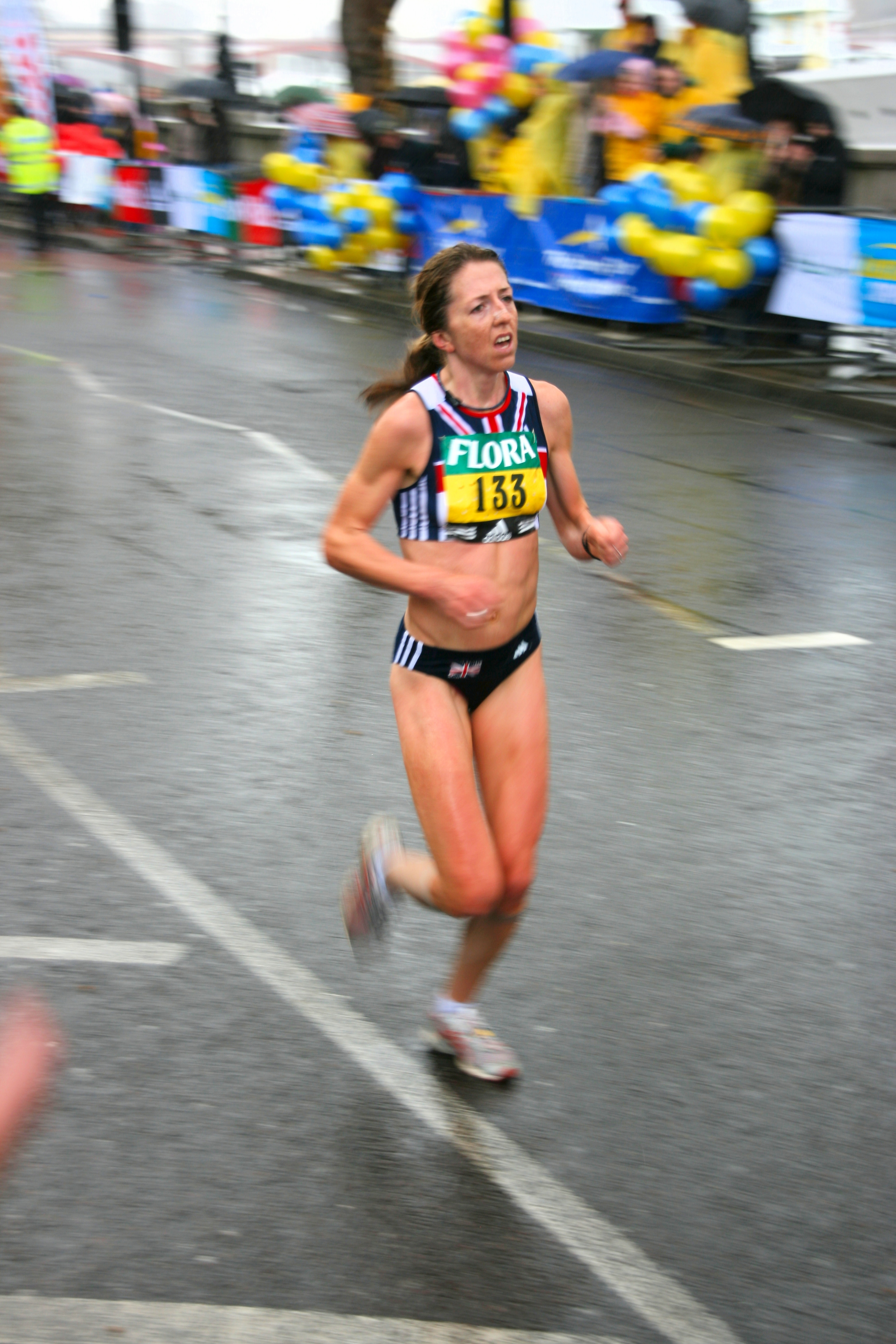
Elite runner Lucy Hassell

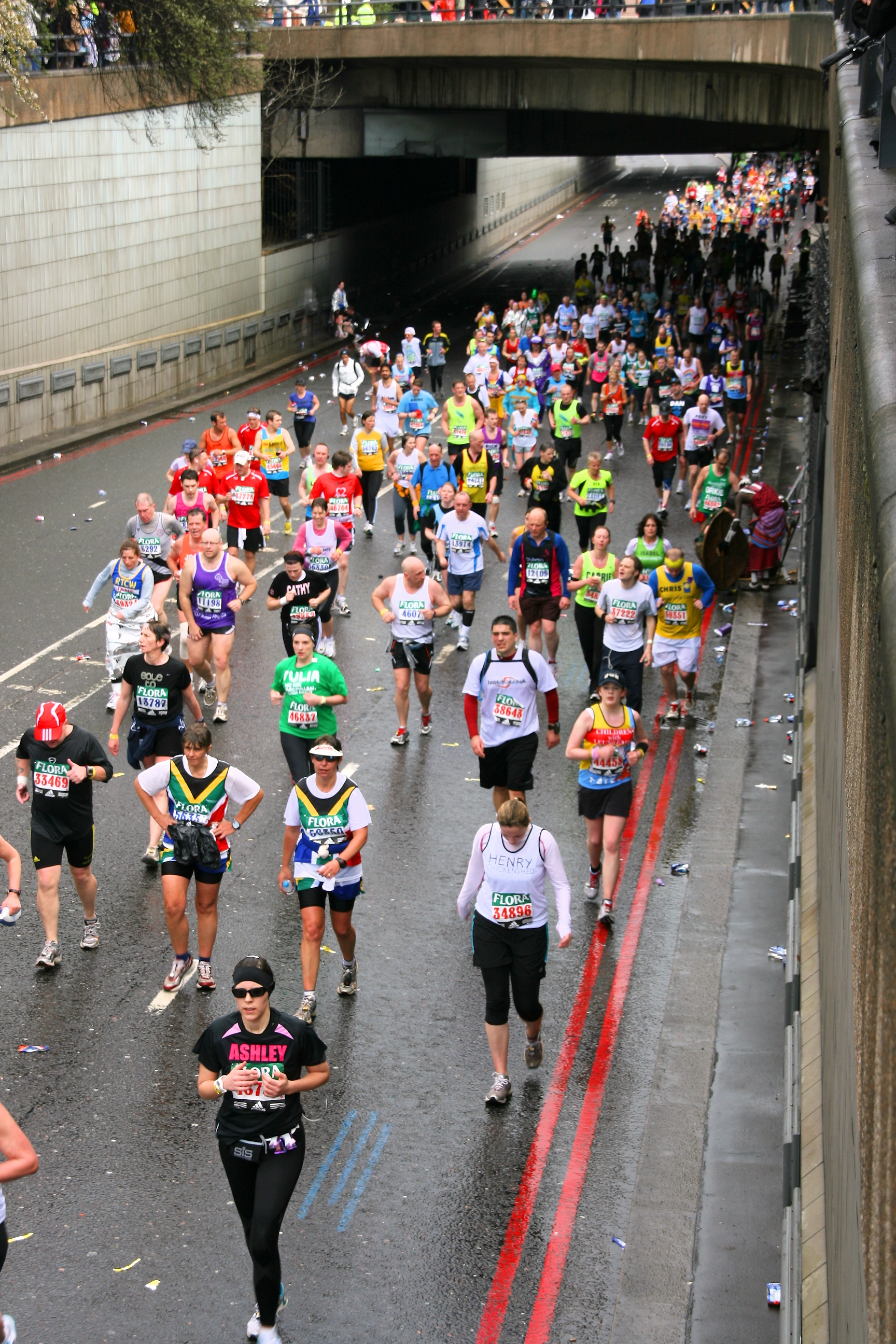
Runners crowd near the finish line

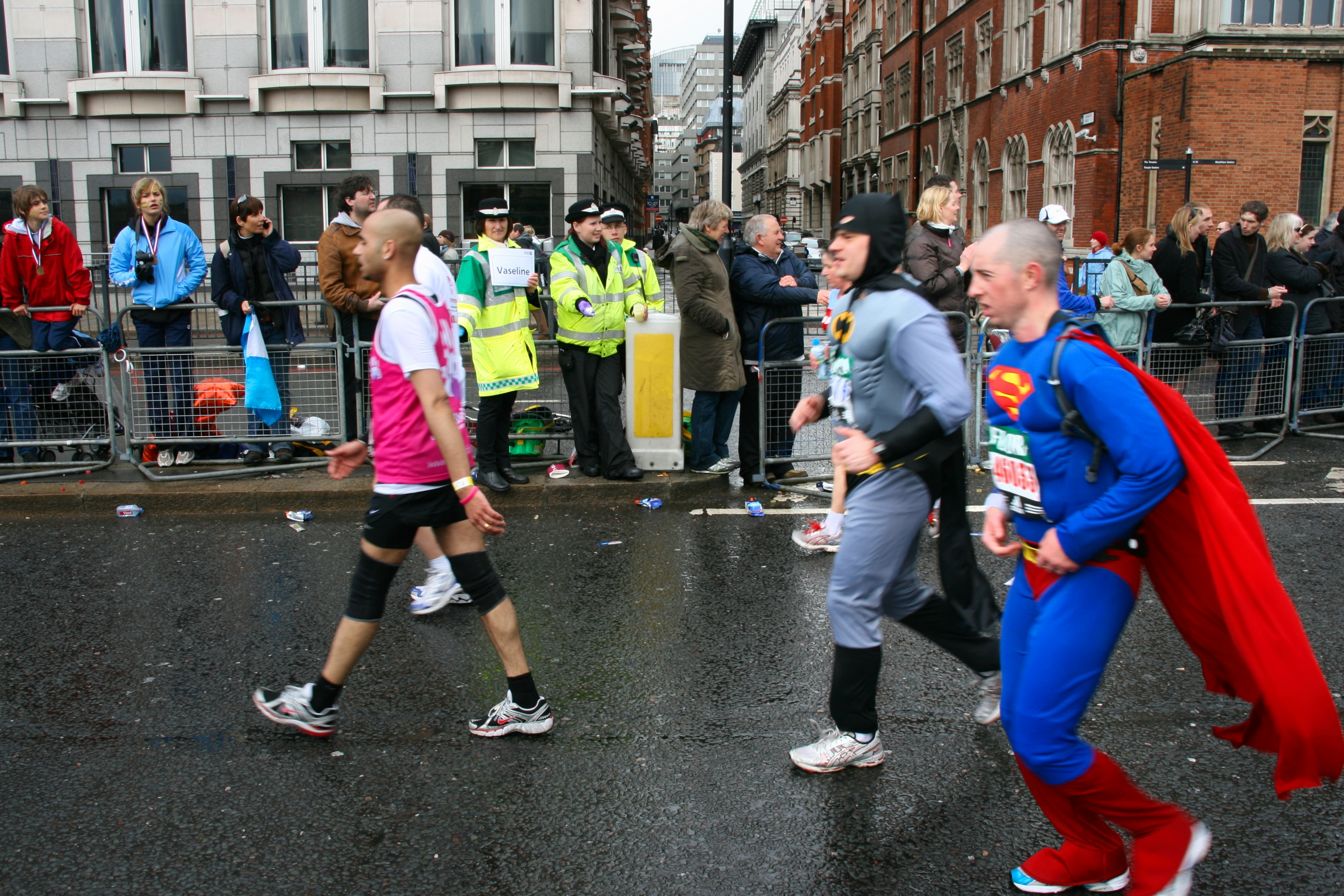
Charity runners wearing superhero costumes: Batman and Superman

== Men ==
| Position | Athlete | Nationality | Time |
|---|---|---|---|
| 1st place, gold medalist(s) | Martin Lel | Kenya | 2:05:15 |
| 2nd place, silver medalist(s) | Samuel Wanjiru | Kenya | 2:05:24 |
| 3rd place, bronze medalist(s) | Abderrahim Goumri | Morocco | 2:05:30 |
| 4 | Emmanuel Kipchirchir Mutai | Kenya | 2:06:15 |
| 5 | Ryan Hall | United States | 2:06:17 |
| 6 | Deriba Merga | Ethiopia | 2:06:38 |
| 7 | Yonas Kifle | Eritrea | 2:08:51 |
| 8 | Felix Limo | Kenya | 2:10:34 |
| 9 | Aleksey Sokolov | Russia | 2:11:41 |
| 10 | Hendrick Ramaala | South Africa | 2:11:44 |
| 11 | Luke Kibet Bowen | Kenya | 2:12:25 |
| 12 | Stefano Baldini | Italy | 2:13:06 |
| 13 | Dan Robinson | United Kingdom | 2:13:10 |
| 14 | Andrew Letherby | Australia | 2:13:50 |
| 15 | Danny Kassap | Democratic Republic of the Congo | 2:15:20 |
| 16 | Tomas Abyu | United Kingdom | 2:15:49 |
| 17 | Richard Kiplagat | Kenya | 2:17:34 |
| 18 | Peter Riley | United Kingdom | 2:18:21 |
| 19 | Toby Lambert | United Kingdom | 2:18:40 |
| 20 | Chad Johnson | United States | 2:18:49 |
| — | Dieudonné Disi | Rwanda | DNF |
| — | Cuthbert Nyasango | Zimbabwe | DNF |
| — | Peter Gilmore | United States | DNF |
| — | Jason Lehmkuhle | United States | DNF |

== Women ==
| Position | Athlete | Nationality | Time |
|---|---|---|---|
| 1st place, gold medalist(s) | Irina Mikitenko | Germany | 2:24:14 |
| 2nd place, silver medalist(s) | Svetlana Zakharova | Russia | 2:24:39 |
| 3rd place, bronze medalist(s) | Gete Wami | Ethiopia | 2:25:37 |
| 4 | Salina Kosgei | Kenya | 2:26:30 |
| 5 | Lyudmila Petrova | Russia | 2:26:45 |
| 6 | Souad Aït Salem | Algeria | 2:27:41 |
| 7 | Berhane Adere | Ethiopia | 2:27:42 |
| 8 | Constantina Diță | Romania | 2:27:45 |
| 9 | Liz Yelling | United Kingdom | 2:28:33 |
| 10 | Adriana Pirtea | Romania | 2:28:52 |
| 11 | Silviya Skvortsova | Russia | 2:29:11 |
| 12 | Hayley Haining | United Kingdom | 2:29:18 |
| 13 | Lisa Jane Weightman | Australia | 2:32:32 |
| 14 | Sun Weiwei | China | 2:36:34 |
| 15 | Lucy MacAlister | United Kingdom | 2:40:31 |
| 16 | Eleni Donta | Greece | 2:41:10 |
| 17 | Susan Partridge | United Kingdom | 2:41:40 |
| 18 | Kim Fawke | United Kingdom | 2:42:08 |
| 19 | Amy Whitehead | United Kingdom | 2:45:38 |
| 20 | Andrea Clement | United Kingdom | 2:45:49 |
| — | Emily Kimuria | Kenya | DNF |
| — | Everline Kimwei | Kenya | DNF |
| — | Birhan Dagne | United Kingdom | DNF |
| — | Michelle Ross-Cope | United Kingdom | DNF |
| — | Natalie Harvey | United Kingdom | DNF |

== Wheelchair men ==
| Position | Athlete | Nationality | Time |
|---|---|---|---|
| 1st place, gold medalist(s) | David Weir | United Kingdom | 1:33:56 |
| 2nd place, silver medalist(s) | Kurt Fearnley | Australia | 1:34:00 |
| 3rd place, bronze medalist(s) | Denis Lemeunier | France | 1:34:01 |
| 4 | Krige Schabort | South Africa | 1:34:02 |
| 5 | Heinz Frei | Switzerland | 1:34:03 |
| 6 | Ernst van Dyk | South Africa | 1:34:25 |
| 7 | Josh George | United States | 1:34:46 |
| 8 | Brian Alldis | United Kingdom | 1:37:23 |
| 9 | Rafael Jiménez | Spain | 1:37:26 |
| 10 | Choke Yasuoka | Japan | 1:39:50 |

== Wheelchair women ==
| Position | Athlete | Nationality | Time |
|---|---|---|---|
| 1st place, gold medalist(s) | Sandra Graf | Switzerland | 1:48:04 |
| 2nd place, silver medalist(s) | Amanda McGrory | United States | 1:51:58 |
| 3rd place, bronze medalist(s) | Shelly Woods | United Kingdom | 2:01:59 |
| 4 | Francesca Porcellato | Italy | 2:04:48 |
| 5 | Sarah Piercy | United Kingdom | 2:35:54 |
