= 2009 London Marathon =

29th annual mass participation marathon race in London

29th London Marathon
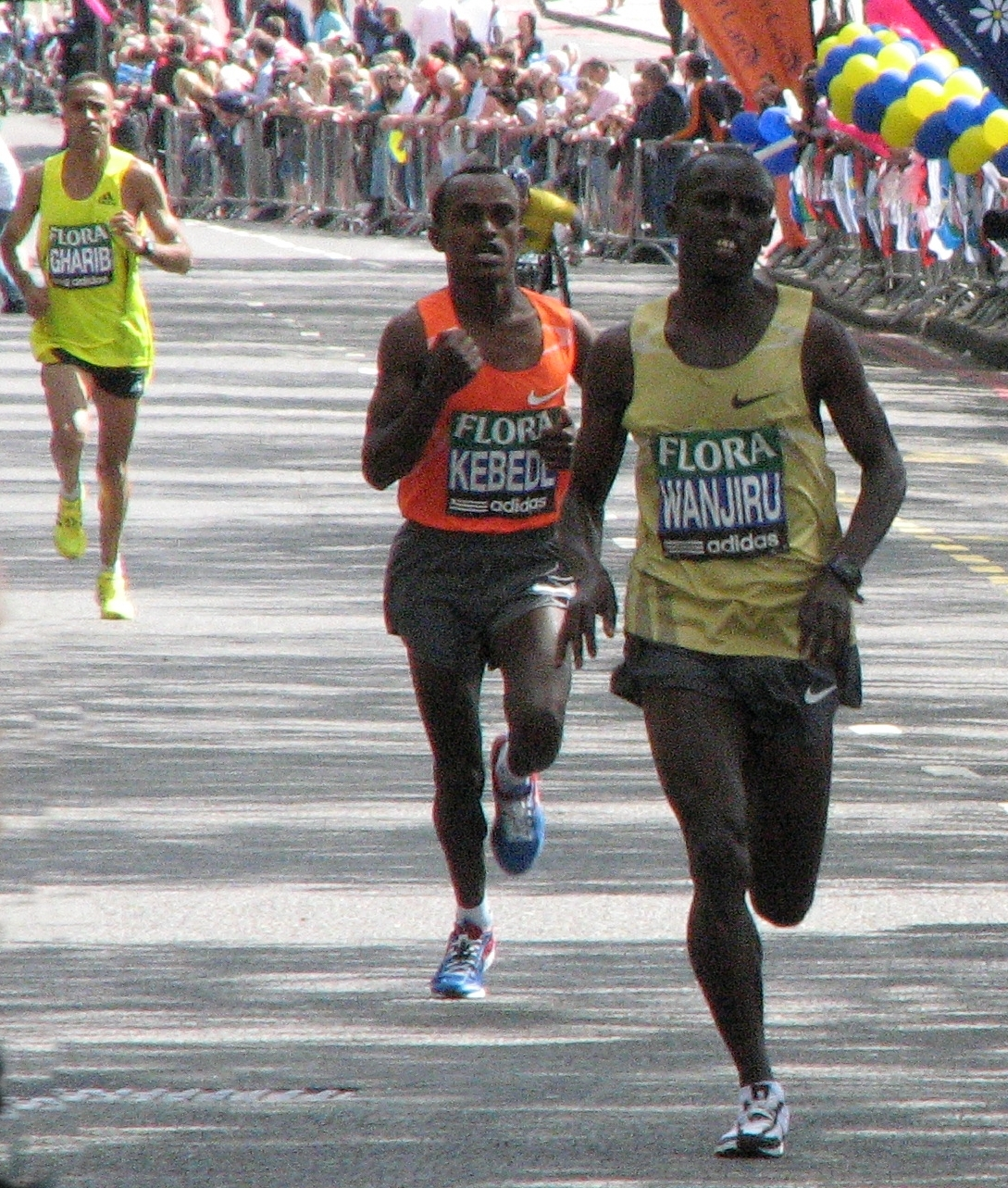
- Leaders during the men's race
- Venue: London, England
- Date: 26 April 2009

Champions
- Men: Samuel Wanjiru (2:05:10)
- Women: Irina Mikitenko (2:22:11)
- Wheelchair men: Kurt Fearnley (1:28:56)
- Wheelchair women: Amanda McGrory (1:50:39)

The 2009 London Marathon was the 29th running of the annual marathon race in London, England, which took place on Sunday, 26 April. The elite men's race was won by Kenya's Samuel Wanjiru in a time of 2:05:10 hours and the women's race was won by Germany's Irina Mikitenko in 2:22:11.

In the wheelchair races, Australia's Kurt Fearnley (1:28:56) and American Amanda McGrory (1:50:39) won the men's and women's divisions, respectively. Fearnley defeated David Weir by one second, taking the Briton's course record in the process.

Around 155,000 people applied to enter the race: 49,995 had their applications accepted and 35,884 started the race. A total of 35,266 runners, 24,228 men and 11,038 women, finished the race.

In the under-17 Mini Marathon, the 3-mile able-bodied and wheelchair events were won by Ronnie Sparke (14:20), Ciara Mageean (16:16), Daniel Lucker (12:30) and Hannah Cockroft (15:42).

== Results ==
=== Men ===
Position	Athlete	Nationality	Time
1st place, gold medalist(s)	Samuel Wanjiru	Kenya	2:05:10
2nd place, silver medalist(s)	Tsegaye Kebede	Ethiopia	2:05:20
3rd place, bronze medalist(s)	Jaouad Gharib	Morocco	2:05:27
4	Emmanuel Kipchirchir Mutai	Kenya	2:06:53
5	Hendrick Ramaala	South Africa	2:07:44
6	Yonas Kifle	Eritrea	2:08:28
7	Atsushi Sato	Japan	2:09:16
8	Meb Keflezighi	United States	2:09:21
9	Felix Limo	Kenya	2:09:47
10	Dathan Ritzenhein	United States	2:10:00
11	Tessema Abshero	Ethiopia	2:11:18
12	Andi Jones	United Kingdom	2:15:20
13	Martin Dent	Australia	2:15:24
14	Rafał Wójcik	Poland	2:16:41
15	Benedict Whitby	United Kingdom	2:18:14
16	Elmore Sibanda	Zimbabwe	2:19:02
17	Richard Gardiner	United Kingdom	2:19:48
18	Tomas Abyu	United Kingdom	2:20:09
19	Neil Renault	United Kingdom	2:20:30
20	John McFarlane	United Kingdom	2:20:44
—	Abderrahim Goumri	Morocco	DQ
—	Luke Kibet Bowen	Kenya	DNF
—	El Hassan Lahssini	France	DNF
—	Zersenay Tadese	Eritrea	DNF
—	Hicham Bellani	Morocco	DNF
—	Elijah Keitany	Kenya	DNF
—	Sammy Kiprono	Kenya	DNF
—	John Kales	Kenya	DNF
—	Philip Wicks	United Kingdom	DNF
—	Simon Tanui	Kenya	DNF
—	William Chebor	Kenya	DNF

- Morocco's Abderrahim Goumri originally placed sixth with a time of 2:08:25 hours, but this was subsequently disqualified due to doping.

=== Women ===
Position	Athlete	Nationality	Time
1st place, gold medalist(s)	Irina Mikitenko	Germany	2:22:11
2nd place, silver medalist(s)	Mara Yamauchi	United Kingdom	2:23:12
3rd place, bronze medalist(s)	Liliya Shobukhova	Russia	2:24:24
4	Svetlana Zakharova	Russia	2:25:06
5	Berhane Adere	Ethiopia	2:25:30
6	Inga Abitova	Russia	2:25:55
7	Catherine Ndereba	Kenya	2:26:22
8	Tomo Morimoto	Japan	2:26:29
9	Gete Wami	Ethiopia	2:26:54
10	Lyudmila Petrova	Russia	2:27:42
11	Yuri Kanō	Japan	2:28:44
12	Zhou Chunxiu	China	2:29:02
13	Kate O'Neill	United States	2:34:48
14	Mika Okunaga	Japan	2:35:36
15	Yesenia Centeno	Spain	2:40:13
—	Martha Komu	Kenya	DNF
—	Constantina Diță	Romania	DNF
—	Anikó Kálovics	Hungary	DNF

=== Wheelchair men ===
Position	Athlete	Nationality	Time
1st place, gold medalist(s)	Kurt Fearnley	Australia	1:28:56
2nd place, silver medalist(s)	David Weir	United Kingdom	1:28:57
3rd place, bronze medalist(s)	Ernst van Dyk	South Africa	1:28:58
4	Masazumi Soejima	Japan	1:30:13
5	Heinz Frei	Switzerland	1:30:15
6	Denis Lemeunier	France	1:32:40
7	Saúl Mendoza	Mexico	1:37:12
8	Rafael Botello	Spain	1:37:38
9	Jose Antonio Iniguez	United States	1:39:17
10	Brain Alldis	United Kingdom	1:40:15

=== Wheelchair women ===
Position	Athlete	Nationality	Time
1st place, gold medalist(s)	Amanda McGrory	United States	1:50:39
2nd place, silver medalist(s)	Sandra Graf	Switzerland	1:50:40
3rd place, bronze medalist(s)	Diane Roy	Canada	1:50:41
4	Edith Hunkeler	Switzerland	1:50:42
5	Christie Dawes	Australia	1:50:43
6	Shelly Woods	United Kingdom	1:50:46
7	Margo Whiteford	United Kingdom	2:46:10
8	Jacqui Kapinowski	United States	2:57:49
9	Nikki Emerson	United Kingdom	3:17:37
