= Diana Lobačevskė =

Lithuanian long-distance runner

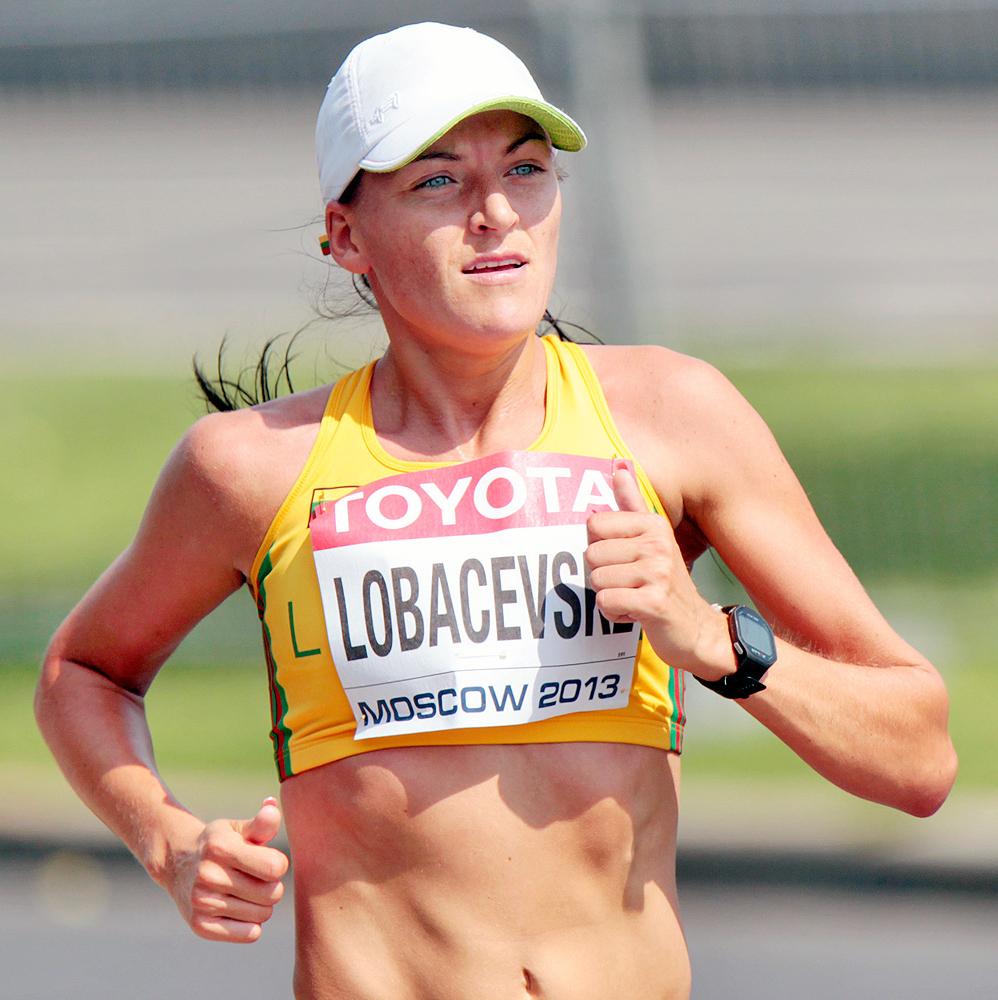

Personal information
- Born: 7 August 1980 (age 46)
- Height: 1.75 m (5 ft 9 in)
- Weight: 61 kg (134 lb)

Sport
- Country: Lithuania
- Sport: Athletics
- Event: Marathon

Diana Lobačevskė (Diana Maciusonytė, born 7 August 1980 in Vilnius) is a Lithuanian long-distance runner who specialises in marathon and half marathon races.

Her marathon personal record is 2:28:03. She represented her country in the marathon at the 2012 Summer Olympics and the 2011, 2013 World Championships in Athletics and 2016 Summer Olympics. She won the Hamburg Marathon in 2013 and the Mexico City Marathon in 2016.

== Career ==
Lobačevskė started out as a track runner and in 1998 she represented her country in the 3000 metres at the 1998 World Junior Championships in Athletics. The following year she placed sixth in the 5000 metres at the 1999 European Athletics Junior Championships held in Riga. In her final international outing in the younger age categories, she finished 13th in the 10,000 metres at the 2001 European Athletics U23 Championships.

She stopped competing in athletics at the top level after 2001 and attended Vilnius Pedagogical University. She returned to competition in 2005, in road races for Beaumont Running Club in Leicester, and in 2008 moved up to the marathon distance and she won both the Vilnius Marathon and Leicester City Marathon that year. She was the fastest woman not entered as an elite athlete at the 2009 London Marathon, setting a personal best of 2:38:26 hours for the distance. That year she also took the Vilnius Half Marathon title (with a new best of 74:09 minutes) and improved her time to 2:35:06 at the Venice Marathon, placing ninth. In 2011, she repeated her Vilnius win and dipped under two and half hours at the Italian Marathon, coming runner-up to Hellen Wanjiku Mugo with a run of 2:28:03 hours.

Lobačevskė returned to the national team in 2011. After a relatively slow 2:40:17 finish at the Vienna Marathon, she came 20th at the European Cup 10000m and set a new best of 33:35.23 minutes for the 10,000 metres event. In Latvia she won the Kuldīga Half Marathon that year. She represented Lithuania at the 2011 World Championships in Athletics, finishing in 25th place in the marathon. Her fastest marathon of the year came at the Beirut Marathon, where she was fourth with 2:34:16 hours.

She raced again at the European Cup 10000m and clocked an improvement of 33:22.47 minutes. She was selected for the Lithuanian Olympic team for the 2012 London Olympics and had the second sub-2:30 run of her career, taking 28th place in 2:29:32. The start of 2013 saw her win her first major race: she topped the podium at the Hamburg Marathon and took the women's title in a time of 2:29:17 hours.

== Achievements ==
Year	Competition	Venue	Position	Event	Notes
Representing Lithuania
1998	World Junior Championships	Annecy, France	13th (h)	3000m	9:33.08
2001	European U23 Championships	Amsterdam, Netherlands	13th	10,000m	35:41.34
2011	World Championships	Daegu, South Korea	25th	Marathon	2:36:05
2012	Olympic Games	London, United Kingdom	28th	Marathon	2:29:32
2013	World Championships	Moscow, Russia	12th	Marathon	2:37:48
2016	Olympic Games	Rio de Janeiro, Brazil	17th	Marathon	2:30:48
