= 2004 IAAF World Indoor Championships – Women's 3000 metres =

The Women's 3000 metres event at the 2004 IAAF World Indoor Championships was held on 5–7 March 2004.

The winning margin was 0.21 seconds which as of July 2024 remains the narrowest winning margin for the women's 3,000 metres at these championships.

== Medalists ==
Gold	Silver	Bronze
Meseret Defar; Ethiopia	Berhane Adere; Ethiopia	Shayne Culpepper; United States

== Results ==
=== Heat ===
First 4 of each heat (Q) and next 4 fastest (q) qualified for the semifinals.

Rank	Heat	Name	Nationality	Time	Notes
1	1	Berhane Adere	Ethiopia	8:49.76	Q
2	1	Yelena Zadorozhnaya	Russia	8:50.73	Q, SB
3	1	Maryna Dubrova	Ukraine	8:51.04	Q
4	1	Marta Domínguez	Spain	8:51.05	Q, SB
5	1	Hayley Tullett	Great Britain	8:51.27	q
6	1	Sabrina Mockenhaupt	Germany	8:52.03	q
7	1	Veerle Dejaeghere	Belgium	8:55.97	q, SB
8	2	Meseret Defar	Ethiopia	8:57.39	Q
9	1	Shayne Culpepper	United States	8:57.48	q
10	2	Joanne Pavey	Great Britain	8:59.05	Q
11	2	Maria McCambridge	Ireland	8:59.11	Q
12	2	Galina Bogomolova	Russia	8:59.65	Q
13	2	Wioletta Frankiewicz	Poland	9:02.58	
14	2	Zahra Ouaziz	Morocco	9:05.19	
15	2	Maria Martins	France	9:06.40	
16	2	Carrie Tollefson	United States	9:08.64	
17	2	Fatiha Baouf	Belgium	9:16.16	
18	1	Docus Inzikuru	Uganda	9:21.48	

=== Final ===
Rank	Name	Nationality	Time	Notes
1st place, gold medalist(s)	Meseret Defar	Ethiopia	9:11.22	
2nd place, silver medalist(s)	Berhane Adere	Ethiopia	9:11.43	
3rd place, bronze medalist(s)	Shayne Culpepper	United States	9:12.15	
4	Marta Domínguez	Spain	9:12.85	
5	Joanne Pavey	Great Britain	9:13.09	
6	Yelena Zadorozhnaya	Russia	9:13.70	
7	Sabrina Mockenhaupt	Germany	9:13.70	
8	Maryna Dubrova	Ukraine	9:14.34	
9	Maria McCambridge	Ireland	9:14.72	
10	Veerle Dejaeghere	Belgium	9:15.21	
11	Galina Bogomolova	Russia	9:17.15	
	Hayley Tullett	Great Britain	DNS	
