= Adriana Nelson =

Romanian distance runner

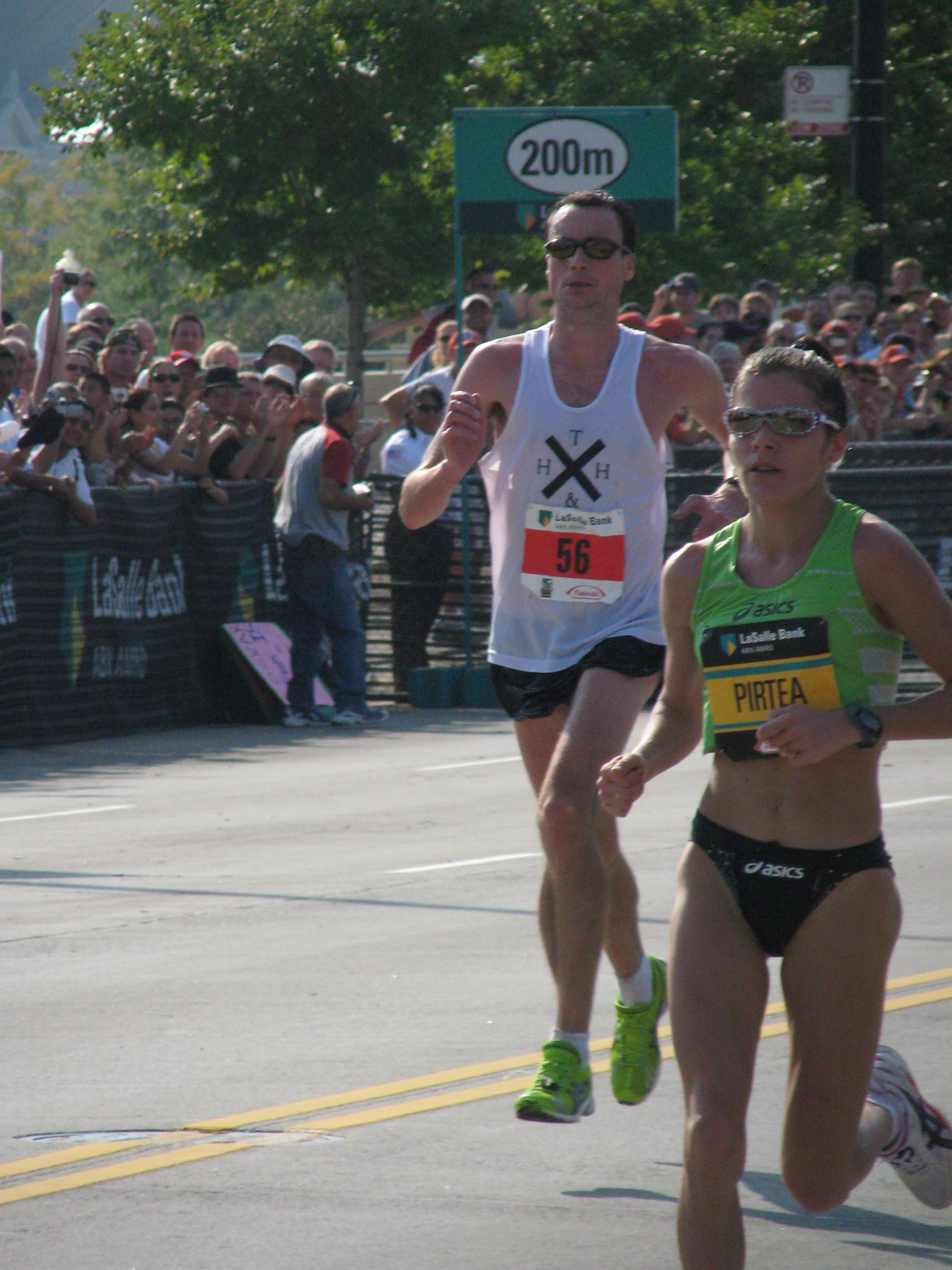
In the 2007 Chicago Marathon Pirtea held the lead until the final few meters.

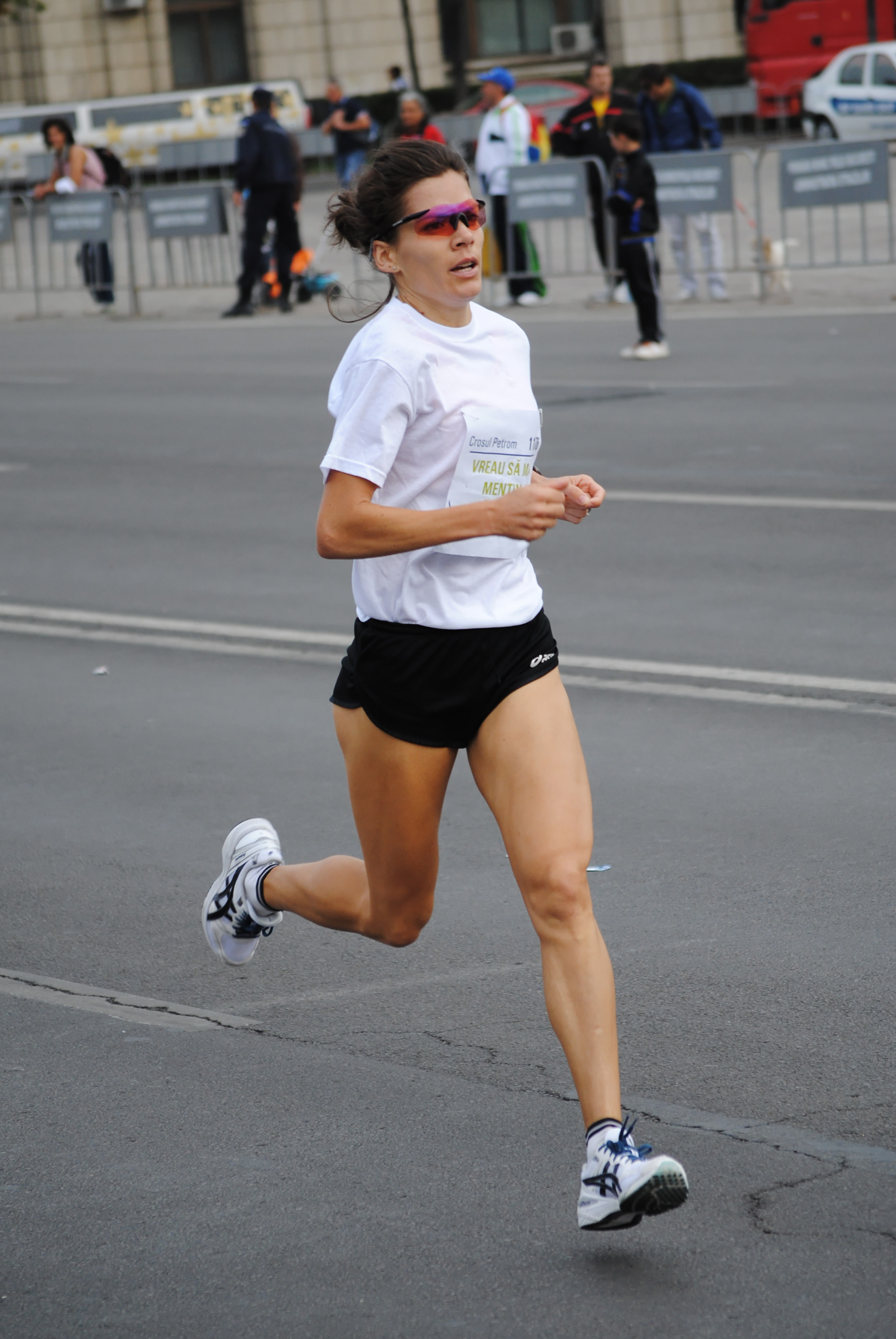
Adriana Pirtea running during the Petrom Cross, Bucharest, Sep 25, 2011

Adriana Nelson, née Pirtea (born January 31, 1980) is a Romanian American long-distance runner who competes in distances up to the marathon. She competed at the 2005 IAAF World Half Marathon Championships and 2006 IAAF World Road Running Championships for Romania, then at the 2012 IAAF World Half Marathon Championships for the United States. At national level, she won six long-distance track titles at the Romanian Athletics Championships and was the 2013 winner at the USA Half Marathon Championships.

In the marathon she was runner-up at the 2007 Chicago Marathon, pipped after celebrating too early.

== Career ==
She made her marathon debut in the 2007 Chicago Marathon held on October 7, 2007, with a second-place finish. She led by a few dozen meters in the final 300 meter stretch run down Columbus Drive on a day of record-setting 88 °F (31 °C) temperatures, but she was caught just before the tape by the defending Chicago Marathon women's champion, Berhane Adere. Pirtea had held a 30-second lead with 600 meters remaining but never looked back as Adere slipped down the right side of the final straightaway under the shield of male runners. Adere was so far to the right that as she crossed the finish line she did not take the tape which was being held at the left side of the finish line. The 2007 Chicago Marathon was the slowest women's Chicago finish since 1992 due to the heat. Pirtea had been a pacemaker at the January 28, 2007, running of the Osaka Ladies Marathon, and an injury prevented her from making her marathon debut at the London Marathon on April 22, 2007.

She became the Romanian national champion in both the 5K (2006 & 2007) and 10K (2007). She graduated from the University of Texas at El Paso in 2005. Pirtea has run the half marathon in 1:09:57 and placed 10th at the World Half Marathon Championships held on October 1, 2005, in Edmonton, Alberta, Canada. This tenth-place finish contributed to the Romanian team gold medal at the World Half Marathon Championships in which 2004 LaSalle Bank Chicago Marathon Women's Champion Constantina Tomescu-Diță placed first for the Romanians, Mihaela Botezan placed 5th and Nuța Olaru placed 8th.

Pirtea had been the silver medalist in the 3,000-meter run at the NCAA Championships. At the NCAA Championships, she had been the #2 seed, but was run down in the final lap by #4 seed Renee Metivier. Like the 2007 Chicago Marathon, the 2005 NCAA 3000 was run at a relatively slow pace. Pirtea had finished 16th in the event as a junior in 2004.

On September 29, 2009, Adriana and her husband, Jeremy Nelson, finished second and first, respectively, in the 13.1 Mini-Marathon in Calumet City, Illinois, with times of 1:12.28 and 1:12.29. Adriana Pirtea won a Suzuki Splash car at the XIVth edition of the Romanian Lottery Cross. The competition took place in Bucharest on October 3, 2011.

On June 22, 2013, Adriana Nelson won the USA Half Marathon Championships hosted by the Grandma's Marathon in Duluth, Minnesota, in 1:11:19.

She reverted her internationally eligibility back to her native Romania in 2020, have previously represented the United States at the 2012 IAAF World Half Marathon Championships.

== Personal life ==
Adriana Nelson resides in Boulder, Colorado. She was married on November 1, 2008, to Jeremy Nelson.

== Personal bests ==
- 5000 metres – 15:36.01 (2005)
- 10,000 metres – 32:38.95 (2012)
- 5K run – 16:21 (2010)
- 10K run – 33:21 (2007)
- 15K run – 51:37 (2012)
- 20K run – 1:09:06 (2012)
- Half marathon – 1:09:59 (2005)
- Marathon – 2:28:52 (2008)

== International competitions ==
Year	Competition	Venue	Position	Event	Notes
2001	European U23 Championships	Amsterdam, Netherlands	6th	10,000 m	34:19.23
2005	World Half Marathon Championships	Edmonton, Canada	10th	Half marathon	1:11:10
2005	World Half Marathon Championships	Edmonton, Canada	1st	Team	3:31:00
2005	Balkan Championships	Novi Sad, Serbia	1st	3000 m	9:18.28
2005	Balkan Championships	Novi Sad, Serbia	1st	5000 m	15:36.01
2006	European Cup	Málaga, Spain	8th	5000 m	16:50.00
2006	World Road Running Championships	Debrecen, Hungary	29th	Half marathon	1:09:30
2006	World Road Running Championships	Debrecen, Hungary	4th	Team	3:19:56
2007	International Chiba Ekiden	Chiba, Japan	9th	7.195 km (final leg)	24:33
2007	International Chiba Ekiden	Chiba, Japan	9th	Marathon relay	2:12:17
2012	World Half Marathon Championships	Kavarna, Bulgaria	18th	Half marathon	1:13:30
2012	World Half Marathon Championships	Kavarna, Bulgaria	5th	Team	3:40:40

== National titles ==
- Romanian Athletics Championships
  - 5000 metres: 2005, 2006, 2007, 2008
  - 10,000 metres: 2007, 2008
- USA Half Marathon Championships: 2013

== Marathons ==
- 2007 Osaka Women's Marathon: DNF
- 2007 Chicago Marathon: 2nd (2:33:52)
- 2008 London Marathon: 10th (2:28:52)
- 2008 Chicago Marathon: 12th (2:35:39)
- 2009 Chicago Marathon: 8th (2:34:07)
- 2009 Rotterdam Marathon: 3rd (2:36:36)
- 2010 Berlin Marathon: 6th (2:30:15)
- 2011 Yokohama Women's Marathon: DNF
- 2011 Osaka Women's Marathon: 7th (2:32:44)
- 2012 United States Olympic Trials: DNF
- 2012 Yokohama Women's Marathon: DNF
- 2013 New York City Marathon: 13th (2:35:05)
- 2014 Frankfurt Marathon: 9th (2:33:54)
- 2014 Boston Marathon: 13th (2:31:15)
- 2015 Boston Marathon: 15th (2:38:47)
- 2016 United States Olympic Trials: 12th (2:38:56)
