= 2009 Chicago Marathon =

Footrace held in Chicago, Illinois

32nd Chicago Marathon
- Venue: Chicago, United States
- Dates: October 11

Champions
- Men: Samuel Wanjiru (2:05:41)
- Women: Irina Mikitenko (2:26:31)

The 2009 Chicago Marathon was the 32nd running of the annual marathon race in Chicago, United States and was held on October 11. The elite men's race was won by Kenya's Samuel Wanjiru in a time of 2:05:41 hours and the women's race was won by Germany's Irina Mikitenko in 2:26:31. The competition was originally won by Russia's Liliya Shobukhova in a time of 2:25:56, but she was retrospectively disqualified due to doping violations.

== Results ==
=== Men ===
Position	Athlete	Nationality	Time
1	Samuel Wanjiru	Kenya	2:05:41
2	Abderrahim Goumri	Morocco	2:06:04
3	Vincent Kipruto	Kenya	2:06:08
4	Charles Munyeki Kiama	Kenya	2:07:06
5	Richard Limo	Kenya	2:08:43
6	Wesley Korir	Kenya	2:10:38
7	Isaac Macharia Wanjohi	Kenya	2:11:09
8	Sergio Reyes	United States	2:15:30
9	Tadese Tola	Ethiopia	2:15:48
10	Patrick Rizzo	United States	2:15:48

=== Women ===
Position	Athlete	Nationality	Time
1	Irina Mikitenko	Germany	2:26:31
2	Lidiya Grigoryeva	Russia	2:26:47
3	Teyba Erkesso	Ethiopia	2:26:56
4	Berhane Adere	Ethiopia	2:28:38
5	Deena Kastor	United States	2:28:50
6	Mizuho Nasukawa	Japan	2:29:22
7	Melissa White	United States	2:32:55
8	Tera Moody	United States	2:32:59
9	Adriana Pirtea	Romania	2:34:07
10	Elfenesh Alemu	Ethiopia	2:35:36
DQ	Liliya Shobukhova	Russia	2:25:56
