= 2007 Chicago Marathon =

Footrace held in Chicago, Illinois

30th Chicago Marathon
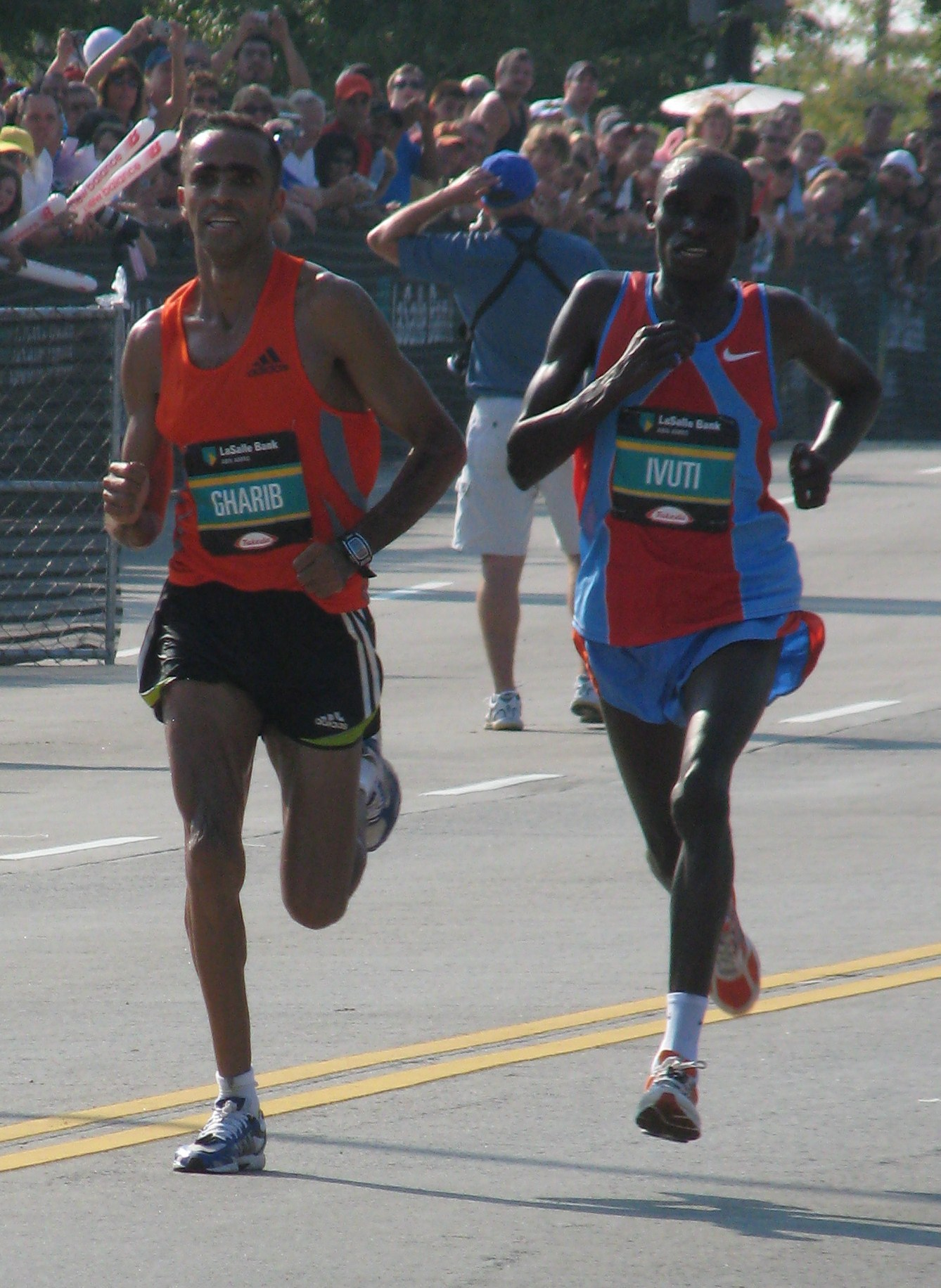
- Patrick Ivuti and Jaouad Gharib during the race
- Venue: Chicago, United States
- Dates: October 7

Champions
- Men: Patrick Ivuti (2:11:11)
- Women: Lidiya Grigoryeva (2:27:17)

The 2007 Chicago Marathon was the 30th running of the annual marathon race in Chicago, United States and was held on October 7. The elite men's race was won by Kenya's Patrick Ivuti in a time of 2:11:11 hours and the women's race was won by Ethiopia's Berhane Adere in 2:33:49.

== Results ==
=== Men ===
Position	Athlete	Nationality	Time
1	Patrick Ivuti	Kenya	2:11:11
2	Jaouad Gharib	Morocco	2:11:11
3	Daniel Njenga	Kenya	2:12:45
4	Robert Kipkoech Cheruiyot	Kenya	2:16:13
5	Benjamin Maiyo	Kenya	2:16:59
6	Christopher Cheboiboch	Kenya	2:17:17
7	Lee Bong-ju	South Korea	2:17:29
8	Michael Cox	United States	2:21:42
9	Jason Flogel	United States	2:26:34
10	Eric Blake	United States	2:26:55

=== Women ===
Position	Athlete	Nationality	Time
1	Berhane Adere	Ethiopia	2:33:49
2	Adriana Pirtea	Romania	2:33:52
3	Kate O'Neill	United States	2:36:15
4	Liz Yelling	United Kingdom	2:37:14
5	Benita Willis	Australia	2:38:30
6	Nuța Olaru	Romania	2:39:04
7	Paige Higgins	United States	2:40:14
8	Yolanda Fernández	Colombia	2:45:23
9	Tera Moody	United States	2:46:40
10	Kathy Butler	United Kingdom	2:48:21

== Death of Chad Schieber ==
A participant in the 2007 Chicago Marathon, Chad Schieber of Michigan, died suddenly while attempting to finish the race. His death was brought on by complications involving his previous diagnosis of mitral valve prolapse.

The race, which had started at 8am, was stopped by 11.30am, with runners calling for emergency help, more than 300 needing picking up by ambulance suffering from nausea, heart palpitations and dizziness from the stifling heat, and 49 requiring hospitalization.
