= Liliya Shobukhova =

Russian long-distance runner

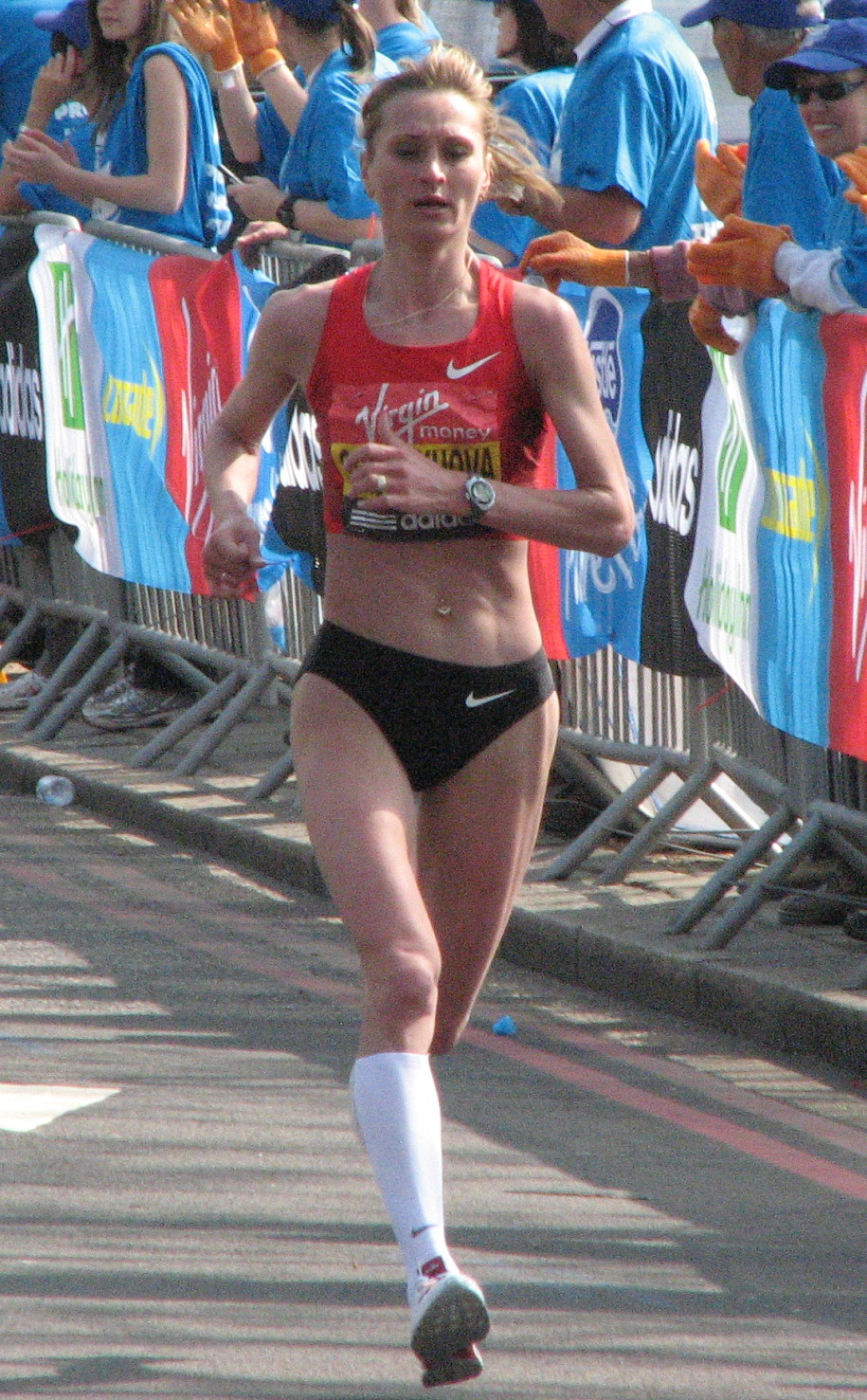
- Shobukhova at the 2011 London Marathon

Personal information
- Born: November 13, 1977 (age 48) Beloretsk, Bashkortostan, Russia
- Height: 1.63 m (5 ft 4 in)
- Weight: 52 kg (115 lb)

Sport
- Country: Russia
- Sport: Women's athletics
- Event: Marathon
- Club: Bashkortostan Army
Medal record
European Championships
Silver medal – second place	2006 Gothenburg	5000 m
World Indoor Championships
Silver medal – second place	2006 Moscow	3000 m

Liliya Bulatovna Shobukhova (née Shagbalova, Divorced name Volkova, (Russian: Лилия Булатoвнa Шoбухова (Шагбaлова) (Волкова); born 13 November 1977) is a retired Russian long-distance runner who competed in marathon races. She previously specialized in the 3000 and 5000 metres track events. She served a doping ban until 23 August 2015.

Shobukhova started her career in middle-distance running in 2001 and reached the final at both the European Indoor Championships and European Athletics Championships in 2002. She moved on to longer distances and, two years later, she represented Russia at the 2004 Athens Olympics and reached the 5000 m final. She ran at the 2005 World Championships in Athletics, but her first major successes came the following year when she won silver medals at the 2006 IAAF World Indoor Championships and the 2006 European Athletics Championships.

Shobukhova began to compete in road races, winning the 2007 Prague Half Marathon, but she still reached the 5000 m final at the 2008 Beijing Olympics. After running in the 10,000 metres at the 2009 World Championships, she focused on road races full-time. The move paid dividends for her as she won at the Chicago Marathon three times straight from 2009 to 2011, as well as the 2010 London Marathon. Her former personal best time of 2:18:20 hours was the Russian record for the event and made her the second fastest woman ever after Paula Radcliffe until it and all her other race results since 9 October 2009 were annulled following an adverse finding of biological passport abnormalities indicative of drug use.

She is a former world indoor record in the 3000 m and a former European record holder in the 3000 m and 5000 m.

== Career ==
Shobukhova grew up in the town of Beloretsk in the Russian Republic of Bashkortostan.

She ran a world indoor record at the 2006 Russian championships, running a time of 8:27.86 in the 3000 m. a few months later, she won a silver medal at the World Indoor Championships before finishing second at the European Championships. She switched to road running in 2007, winning at the Prague Half Marathon and competing at the 2007 IAAF World Road Running Championships.

In the 2008 Russian Championships held in Kazan on 19 July 2008, she set a new European 5000 m record of 14:23.75, to become the fourth fastest ever over the distance. She was selected to represent Russia in the women's 5000 metres at the 2008 Summer Olympics in Beijing. After the Olympics, she won the Philadelphia Distance Run and set a half marathon best of 1:10:21, beating Catherine Ndereba to the line.

In October 2009, Shobukhova was the female winner of the Chicago Marathon, finishing in a time of 2:25:56. Shobukhova was the female winner of the 2010 London Marathon, finishing in a time of 2:22:00.

She returned to Chicago to defend her title in October 2010 and she ran a very even pace. She overhauled Atsede Baysa in the second half of the race, as the Ethiopian struggled in the heat, and she went on to win for a second consecutive occasion with a Russian record of 2:20:25 for the marathon – becoming the tenth fastest ever. As a result of the win, she took the 2009–2010 World Marathon Majors jackpot of $500,000 US dollars.

She started 2011 with a Russian record performance at the London Marathon, finishing in a new personal best of 2:20:15, but she had to settle for second behind Mary Keitany of Kenya. In October 2011 Shobukhova started the Chicago Marathon as the heavy favorite along with Ejegayehu Dibaba. After a cautious first half, she sped away to win the Chicago Marathon for the third straight time in hot weather. Her time of 2 hours, 18 minutes, and 20 seconds was a new Russian record and it made her the second fastest women's marathoner ever in history behind Paula Radcliffe of Great Britain.

One of the advantages she has over her competitors is a fast sprint finish, due to her track credentials. At the 2009 Chicago Marathon, her final 2.2 km was timed at 6 minutes and 36 seconds, a 3:00 pace. This is easily one of the fastest splits ever in women's marathoning. She also sprinted away from the field at the 2010 London Marathon to win by 13 seconds, with her final 200m timed at 33 seconds.

She competed in the marathon at the 2012 Summer Olympics, but failed to finish. She looked to revive her season with a defence of her title at the 2012 Chicago Marathon but she dropped away from the leaders in the second half of the race and finished in fourth.

=== Doping ===
On April 29, 2014, the Russia Athletic Federation announced that they found "abnormalities" in her biological passport. As a result, Shobukhova's race results since 9 October 2009 would be annulled and she was issued with a ban from competition for two years, with her suspension to end on 23 January 2015. Pending any appeal, she is stripped of her 2009, 2010 and 2011 Chicago Marathon victories, as well as her 2010 London Marathon win, and may be required to pay back prize money and appearance fees earned from racing. Paula Radcliffe, the women's marathon world record holder, commented that Shobukhova was "finally exposed as a drug cheat. Fraud on so many levels, so much money effectively stolen in appearance fees, winnings and endorsements." In August 2015 the IAAF announced that she had been banned from sports for 3 years and 2 months, but WADA granted Shobukhova a reduction of seven months for providing information, and her sanction finished on 23 August 2015.

== International competition ==
Representing Russia
Year	Competition	Venue	Position	Event	Notes
2001	World Cross Country Championships	Ostend, Belgium	64th	Short race	
2002	World Cross Country Championships	Dublin, Ireland	23rd	Short race	
2002	European Indoor Championships	Vienna, Austria	5th	3000 m	
2002	European Athletics Championships	Munich, Germany	17th	5000 m	
2004	European Cup	Bydgoszcz, Poland	2nd	5000 m	
2004	Olympic Games	Athens, Greece	13th	5000 m	
2005	European Indoor Championships	Madrid, Spain	5th	3000 m	
2005	World Cross Country Championships	Saint-Galmier, France	32nd	Short race	
2005	European Cup	Florence, Italy	1st	5000 m	
2005	World Championships	Helsinki, Finland	9th	5000 m	
2005	World Athletics Final	Monte Carlo, Monaco	10th	3000 m	
2005	European Cross Country Championships	Tilburg, Netherlands	21st	Senior race	
2005	European Cross Country Championships	Tilburg, Netherlands	1st	Team race	
2006	World Indoor Championships	Moscow, Russia	2nd	3000 m	
2006	World Cross Country Championships	Fukuoka, Japan	36th	Short race	
2006	European Championships	Gothenburg, Sweden	2nd	5000 m	
2006	IAAF World Cup	Athens, Greece	2nd	5000 m	
2007	World Road Running Championships	Udine, Italy	25th	Half marathon	
2008	Summer Olympics	Beijing, China	6th	5000 m	
2009	World Championships in Athletics	Berlin, Germany	19th	10,000 m	
2012	Summer Olympics	London, United Kingdom	DQ	Marathon	

== Professional marathons ==
Year	Competition	Venue	Position	Notes
2009	London Marathon	London, United Kingdom	3rd	
2009	Chicago Marathon	Chicago, United States	DQ ~~1st~~	
2010	London Marathon	London, United Kingdom	DQ ~~1st~~	
2010	Chicago Marathon	Chicago, United States	DQ ~~1st~~	
2011	London Marathon	London, United Kingdom	DQ ~~2nd~~	
2011	Chicago Marathon	Chicago, United States	DQ ~~1st~~	
2012	Chicago Marathon	Chicago, United States	DQ ~~4th~~	

== Personal bests ==
- 1500 metres – 4:03.78 (2004)
- Mile run – 4:22.14 (2004)
- 3000 metres – 8:27.86 (2006)
- 5000 metres – 14:23.75 (2008)
- 10,000 metres – 30:29.36 (2009)
- 10K run – 32:19 (2009)
- Half marathon – 1:10:21 (2008)
- Marathon – 2:24:24 (2009)

== See also ==
- List of doping cases in athletics
- Doping at the Olympic Games
- List of IAAF World Indoor Championships medalists (women)
- List of European Athletics Championships medalists (women)
- List of 5000 metres national champions (women)
- List of winners of the London Marathon
- List of winners of the Chicago Marathon (see footnote for her three first place disqualifications)
- List of marathoners

Records
Preceded by Elvan Abeylegesse	Women's 5000 m European Record Holder; 11 June 2004 – 21 July 2019	Succeeded by Sifan Hassan
Preceded by Berhane Adere	Women's 3000 m Indoor World Record Holder; 17 February 2006 – 3 February 2007	Succeeded by Meseret Defar
Preceded by Gabriela Szabo	Women's 3000 m Indoor European Record Holder; 17 February 2006 – 4 February 2017	Succeeded by Laura Muir
