= 2006 Chicago Marathon =

Footrace held in Chicago, Illinois

29th Chicago Marathon
- Venue: Chicago, United States
- Dates: October 22

Champions
- Men: Robert Kipkoech Cheruiyot (2:07:35)
- Women: Lidiya Grigoryeva (2:27:17)

The 2006 Chicago Marathon was the 29th running of the annual marathon race in Chicago, United States and was held on October 22. The elite men's race was won by Kenya's Robert Kipkoech Cheruiyot in a time of 2:07:35 and the women's race was won by Ethiopia's Berhane Adere in 2:20:42.

== Results ==
=== Men ===
Position	Athlete	Nationality	Time
1	Robert Kipkoech Cheruiyot	Kenya	2:07:35
2	Daniel Njenga	Kenya	2:07:40
3	Jimmy Muindi	Kenya	2:07:51
4	Abdihakem Abdirahman	United States	2:08:56
5	Robert Cheboror	Kenya	2:09:25
6	Brian Sell	United States	2:10:47
7	Japhet Kosgei	Kenya	2:11:37
8	Benjamin Maiyo	Kenya	2:11:53
9	Dejene Berhanu	Ethiopia	2:12:27
10	Meshack Kosgei Kirwa	Kenya	2:12:31

=== Women ===
Position	Athlete	Nationality	Time
1	Berhane Adere	Ethiopia	2:20:42 NR
2	Galina Bogomolova	Russia	2:20:47 NR
3	Benita Willis	Australia	2:22:36 NR
4	Madaí Pérez	Mexico	2:22:59 NR
5	Constantina Diță	Romania	2:24:25
6	Nuța Olaru	Romania	2:25:37
7	Hiromi Ominami	Japan	2:26:54
8	Lyudmila Petrova	Russia	2:27:08
9	Kathy Butler	United Kingdom	2:28:39
10	Dulce María Rodríguez	Mexico	2:28:54
