= 1992 World Junior Championships in Athletics – Women's 10,000 metres =

The women's 10,000 metres event at the 1992 World Junior Championships in Athletics was held in Seoul, South Korea, at Olympic Stadium on 19 September.

== Medalists ==
Gold	Wang Junxia; China
Silver	Gete Wami; Ethiopia
Bronze	Sally Barsosio; Kenya

== Results ==
=== Final ===
19 September

Rank	Name	Nationality	Time	Notes
1st place, gold medalist(s)	Wang Junxia	China	32:29.90	
2nd place, silver medalist(s)	Gete Wami	Ethiopia	32:41.57	
3rd place, bronze medalist(s)	Sally Barsosio	Kenya	32:41.76	
4	Lydia Cheromei	Kenya	33:01.99	
5	Merima Denboba	Ethiopia	33:57.21	
6	Inna Kozina	Commonwealth of Independent States	34:11.02	
7	Dörte Köster	Germany	34:19.36	
8	Kwak Hye-soon	South Korea	34:19.79	
9	Pia Ruotsalainen	Finland	34:21.89	
10	Yelena Vinitskaya	Commonwealth of Independent States	34:24.67	
11	Keiko Kato	Japan	34:24.70	
12	Ana Nanu	Romania	34:26.46	
13	Patrizia Ritondo	Italy	34:52.90	
14	Tiziana Alagia	Italy	35:08.61	
15	Fleur Deconihout	France	35:13.17	
16	Sang Mucuo	China	35:14.51	
17	Kristin Liebich	Germany	35:25.66	
18	Natalia Requena	Spain	35:29.34	
19	Yoko Yamamoto	Japan	36:07.28	
20	Kornélia Pásztor	Hungary	37:25.13	

== Participation ==
According to an unofficial count, 20 athletes from 13 countries participated in the event.

- China (2)
- Commonwealth of Independent States (2)
- Ethiopia (2)
- Finland (1)
- France (1)
- Germany (2)
- Hungary (1)
- Italy (2)
- Japan (2)
- Kenya (2)
- Romania (1)
- South Korea (1)
- Spain (1)
