= 2001 World Championships in Athletics – Women's 10,000 metres =

The women's 10,000 metres event featured at the 2001 World Championships in Edmonton, Alberta, Canada. There were a total number of 24 participating athletes, with the final being held on 7 August 2001.

The winning margin was 0.04 seconds which as of June 2024 remains the narrowest winning margin in any 10,000 metres held at the World Athletics Championships or at the Olympics.

== Medalists ==
Gold	Derartu Tulu; Ethiopia (ETH)
Silver	Berhane Adere; Ethiopia (ETH)
Bronze	Gete Wami; Ethiopia (ETH)

== Final ==
Rank	Name	Result
Gold medal	Derartu Tulu (ETH)	31:48.81
Silver medal	Berhane Adere (ETH)	31:48.85
Bronze medal	Gete Wami (ETH)	31:49.98
4.	Paula Radcliffe (GBR)	31:50.06
5.	Mihaela Botezan (ROM)	32:03.46
6.	Lyudmila Petrova (RUS)	32:04.94 (SB)
7.	Asmae Leghzaoui (MAR)	32:06.35
8.	Yamna Belkacem (FRA)	32:09.21
9.	Haruko Okamoto (JPN)	32:14.56
10.	Lyudmila Biktasheva (RUS)	32:18.64
11.	Deena Drossin (USA)	32:18.65
12.	Olivera Jevtić (YUG)	32:19.44
13.	Mizuki Noguchi (JPN)	32:19.94
14.	Aster Bacha (ETH)	32:25.81
15.	Teresa Recio (ESP)	32:30.56
16.	Hrisostomia Iakovou (GRE)	32:31.46 (NR)
17.	Natalya Berkut (UKR)	32:32.68
18.	Gunhild Haugen (NOR)	32:33.72
19.	Mari Ozaki (JPN)	32:39.17
20.	Tina Connelly (CAN)	33:00.37
21.	Ana Dias (POR)	33:03.78
22.	Jennifer Rhines (USA)	33:11.22
23.	Inga Juodeškiené (LTU)	33:11.60
24.	María Paredes (ECU)	35:44.52 (PB)

== See also ==
- 2000 Olympics Women's 10,000 metres
