= 2003 World Championships in Athletics – Women's 10,000 metres =

The women's 10,000 metres event featured at the 2003 World Championships in Paris, France. The final was held on 23 August 2003.

== Summary ==
Almost 10 years before this race, Wang Junxia had set the world record out to a remarkable 29:31.78 at the 1993 National Games of China. For the next 9 years, second place in that race in Beijing, Zhong Huandi had also been the second best 10,000m ever run by a woman 30:13.37 (more than half a lap behind Wang). One year before this race, Paula Radcliffe finally improved on second place, her 30:01.09 got within 30 seconds of the world record, showing women the record was not impossible. Radcliffe was not in this race, having set the world record in the Marathon 4 months earlier as well as the 10K road world record two months before that. Missing those two, this race only became the greatest women's 10,000m in history.

Anikó Kálovics started off fast, running a 2:59.62 first 1K. Then Sun Yingjie took the point, her awkward running form taking the crowd through 4K in 12:00.16. Kenyan ex-pat Lornah Kiplagat running for The Netherlands then took over the lead, 15:06.53 to the halfway point and the next kilometer just barely over 3 minutes to take the 5 leaders to 6K in 18:07.25. During the next kilo, the defending champion and two time Olympic champion Derartu Tulu dropped out. Only Sun, Kiplagat and two Ethiopians; Werknesh Kidane and Berhane Adere remained all taking their turn trying to take the lead, the group reaching 9K in 27:14.06. On the penultimate lap, Sun dropped a 68 to put herself in front. On the final backstretch, Adere moved onto Sun's shoulder to pounce for the lead. Sun accelerated with the challenge, but Adere went by in a different gear, running away to the gold medal. Kiplagat couldn't stay with the others battling for the lead, but Kidane didn't let Sun get away, the two sprinting down the home and dipping at the finish line. The photo finish revealed that Kidane had beaten Sun by .05 of a second after 10,000 metres.

When the dust had settled, Adere had the #3 best time in history, Kidane #4, Sun #5 and Kiplagat #6. Even Alla Zhilyaeva, who was not really in contention in a distant 5th place, had run the #12 time in history. In 7th place Xing Huina set the world junior record 30:31.55.

== Final ranking ==
| RANK | ATHLETE | TIME |
|---|---|---|
| | Berhane Adere (ETH) | 30:04.18 |
| | Werknesh Kidane (ETH) | 30:07.15 |
| | Sun Yingjie (CHN) | 30:07.20 |
| 4. | Lornah Kiplagat (NED) | 30:12.53 |
| 5. | Alla Zhilyaeva (RUS) | 30:23.07 |
| 6. | Galina Bogomolova (RUS) | 30:26.20 |
| 7. | Xing Huina (CHN) | 30:31.55 |
| 8. | Benita Johnson (AUS) | 30:37.68 |
| 9. | Ejegayehu Dibaba (ETH) | 31:01.07 |
| 10. | Jeļena Prokopčuka (LAT) | 31:06.14 |
| 11. | Kayoko Fukushi (JPN) | 31:10.57 |
| 12. | Deena Kastor (USA) | 31:17.86 |
| 13. | Mihaela Botezan (ROU) | 31:28.72 |
| 14. | Yoko Shibui (JPN) | 31:42.01 |
| 15. | Megumi Oshima (JPN) | 31:47.00 |
| 16. | Lidiya Grigoryeva (RUS) | 31:49.41 |
| 17. | Elva Dryer (USA) | 31:59.81 |
| 18. | Helena Javornik (SLO) | 32:01.57 |
| 19. | Salina Jebet Kosgei (KEN) | 32:09.15 |
| 20. | Anikó Kálovics (HUN) | 32:15.96 |
| 21. | Sonja Stolic (SCG) | 33:08.87 |
| 22. | Nataliya Berkut (UKR) | 33:12.84 |
| 23. | Yesenia Centeno (ESP) | 33:32.50 |
| — | Fernanda Ribeiro (POR) | DNF |
| — | Derartu Tulu (ETH) | DNF |
| — | Sabrina Mockenhaupt (GER) | DNF |
| — | Marie Davenport (IRL) | DNS |
| — | Adriana Fernández (MEX) | DNS |

== See also ==
- Athletics at the 2003 Pan American Games - Women's 10000 metres
