= Maria McCambridge =

Irish long-distance runner

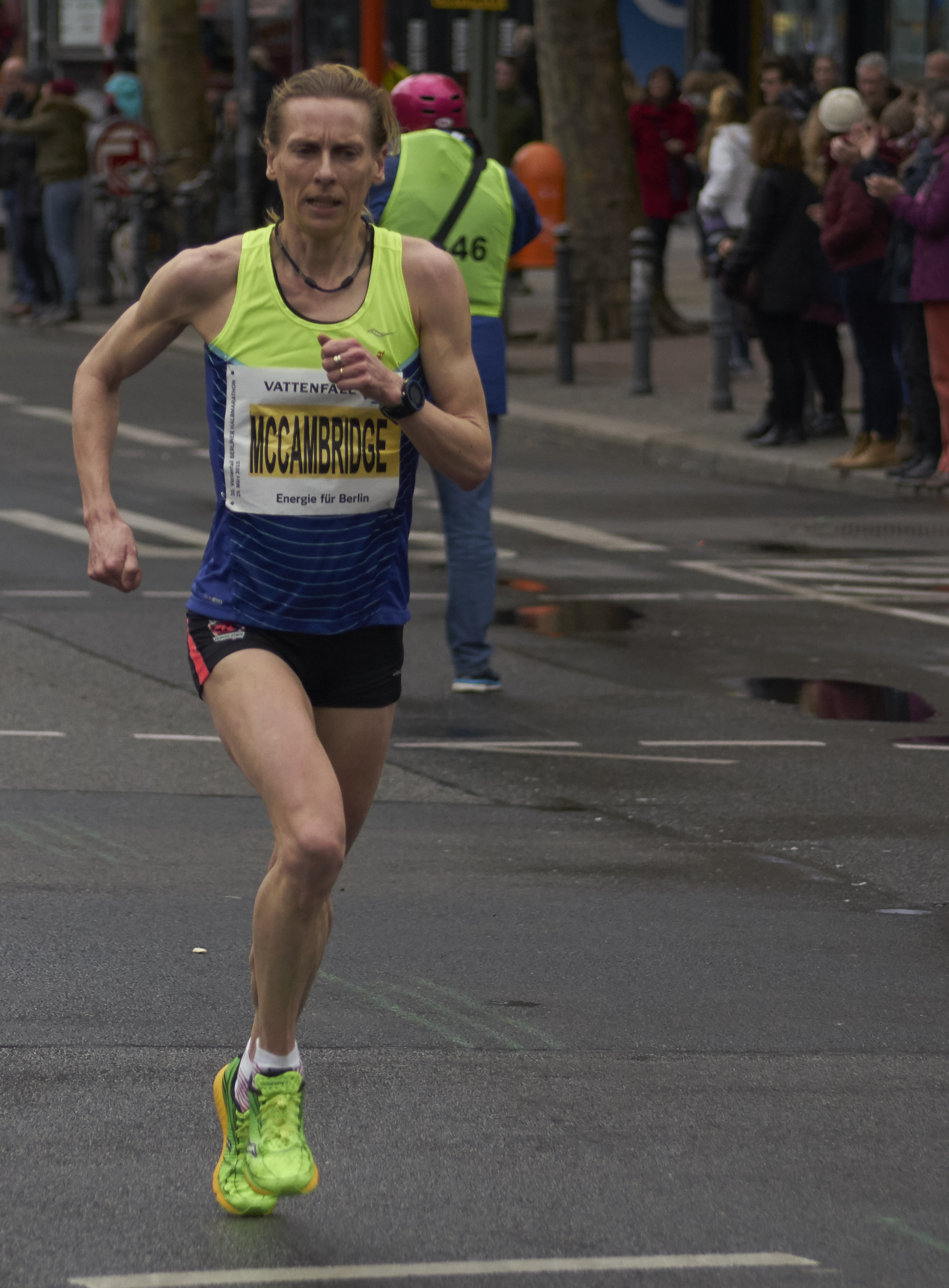
Maria McCambridge, Berlin Half Marathon 2015

Maria McCambridge (born 10 July 1975 in Dublin) is an Irish long-distance runner who competed mostly in the 3000 and 5000 meters before moving up to the marathon.

McCambridge competed for the Providence Friars track and field team in the NCAA. She represented her country at the 2004 Summer Olympics, as well as three outdoor and three indoor World Championships.

== Competition record ==
Year	Competition	Venue	Position	Event	Notes
Representing Ireland
2001	World Championships	Edmonton, Canada	33rd (h)	5000 m	16:04.49
2002	European Championships	Munich, Germany	19th (h)	5000 m	17:00.15
2003	World Indoor Championships	Birmingham, United Kingdom	12th (h)	3000 m	9:03.68
2004	World Indoor Championships	Budapest, Hungary	9th	3000 m	9:14.72
2004	Olympic Games	Athens, Greece	31st (h)	5000 m	15:57.42
2005	World Championships	Helsinki, Finland	26th (h)	5000 m	16:05.44
2006	World Indoor Championships	Moscow, Russia	10th	3000 m	9:07.26
2013	World Championships	Moscow, Russia	–	Marathon	DNF

== Personal bests ==
Outdoor

- 1500 metres – 4:11.73 (Dublin 2005)
- 3000 metres – 8:50.40 (Madrid 2005)
- 5000 metres – 15:05.86 (Heusden-Zolder 2004)
- 10,000 metres – 33:22.79 (Dublin 2012)
- Half-Marathon – 1:12:26 (Charleville 2014)
- Marathon – 2:35:28 (Dublin 2012)
- 3000 metres steeplechase – 10:20.6 (Glasgow 2007)

Indoor

- 3000 metres – 8:56.48 (Belfast 2004)
