= 2001 European Athletics U23 Championships – Women's 10,000 metres =

The women's 10,000 metres event at the 2001 European Athletics U23 Championships was held in Amsterdam, Netherlands, at Olympisch Stadion on 13 July.

== Medalists ==
| Gold | Olga Romanova; Russia |
| Silver | Sonja Stolić; Yugoslavia |
| Bronze | Sabrina Mockenhaupt; Germany |

== Results ==
=== Final ===
13 July

| Rank | Name | Nationality | Time | Notes |
|---|---|---|---|---|
| 1st place, gold medalist(s) | Olga Romanova | Russia | 33:36.03 | |
| 2nd place, silver medalist(s) | Sonja Stolić | Yugoslavia | 33:37.02 | |
| 3rd place, bronze medalist(s) | Sabrina Mockenhaupt | Germany | 33:38.38 | |
| 4 | Rosaria Konsole | Italy | 33:55.72 | |
| 5 | Živilė Balčiūnaitė | Lithuania | 34:04.34 | |
| 6 | Adriana Pirtea | Romania | 34:19.23 | |
| 7 | Vanesa Veiga | Spain | 34:21.17 | |
| 8 | Monika Drybulska | Poland | 34:22.32 | |
| 9 | Yelena Tolstygina | Belarus | 34:24.23 | |
| 10 | Agnieszka Stawicka | Poland | 34:58.27 | |
| 11 | Ágnes Kroneraff | Hungary | 35:00.70 | |
| 12 | Ann Parmentier | Belgium | 35:04.12 | |
| 13 | Diana Maciusonytė | Lithuania | 35:41.34 | |
| 14 | Petra Teveli | Hungary | 36:13.68 | |
| 15 | Katarzyna Dziwosz | Poland | 36:29.16 | |

== Participation ==
According to an unofficial count, 15 athletes from 11 countries participated in the event.

- Belarus (1)
- Belgium (1)
- Germany (1)
- Hungary (2)
- Italy (1)
- Lithuania (2)
- Poland (3)
- Romania (1)
- Russia (1)
- Spain (1)
- Yugoslavia (1)
