= 2003 IAAF World Indoor Championships – Women's 3000 metres =

The women's 3000 metres event at the 2003 IAAF World Indoor Championships was held on March 14–15.

== Medalists ==
Gold	Silver	Bronze
Berhane Adere; Ethiopia	Marta Domínguez; Spain	Meseret Defar; Ethiopia

== Results ==
=== Heats ===
First 4 of each heat (Q) and next 4 fastest (q) qualified for the semifinals.

Rank	Heat	Name	Nationality	Time	Notes
1	2	Meseret Defar	Ethiopia	8:49.80	Q, PB
2	2	Maria Cristina Grosu-Mazilu	Romania	8:51.58	Q, PB
3	2	Marta Domínguez	Spain	8:51.97	Q
4	2	Zhor El Kamch	Morocco	8:52.31	Q
	2	Maria Tsirba	Greece	~~8:52.70~~	q, Doping
5	1	Berhane Adere	Ethiopia	8:53.64	Q
6	1	Galina Bogomolova	Russia	8:55.72	Q
7	1	Benita Johnson	Australia	8:57.08	Q
8	1	Zahra Ouaziz	Morocco	8:57.21	Q
9	1	Hayley Tullett	Great Britain	9:00.13	q
10	2	Susanne Pumper	Austria	9:02.98	q, SB
11	1	Amaia Piedra	Spain	9:03.41	q
12	2	Maria McCambridge	Ireland	9:03.68	PB
13	2	Katie McGregor	United States	9:06.30	
14	1	Wioletta Frankiewicz	Poland	9:09.27	
15	1	Lívia Tóth	Hungary	9:10.95	
16	1	Maria Martins	France	9:12.48	
17	2	Yelena Sidorchenkova	Russia	9:13.51	
18	2	Korene Hinds	Jamaica	9:15.18	
19	1	Dina Cruz	Guatemala	9:56.67	
	1	Collette Liss-Douglas	United States	DNF	

=== Final ===
Rank	Name	Nationality	Time	Notes
1st place, gold medalist(s)	Berhane Adere	Ethiopia	8:40.25	
2nd place, silver medalist(s)	Marta Domínguez	Spain	8:42.17	
3rd place, bronze medalist(s)	Meseret Defar	Ethiopia	8:42.58	PB
4	Zahra Ouaziz	Morocco	8:49.50	
5	Zhor El Kamch	Morocco	8:49.55	
6	Galina Bogomolova	Russia	8:50.62	PB
7	Benita Johnson	Australia	8:51.62	SB
DQ	Maria Tsirba	Greece	~~8:52.21~~	Doping
8	Maria Cristina Grosu-Mazilu	Romania	8:58.65	
9	Amaia Piedra	Spain	8:59.76	PB
10	Hayley Tullett	Great Britain	9:00.17	
11	Susanne Pumper	Austria	9:08.64	
