= 2006 European Athletics Championships – Women's 5000 metres =

Women's 5000 metres at the European Athletics Championships

The women's 5000 metres at the 2006 European Athletics Championships were held at the Ullevi on August 12.

== Medalists ==
Gold	Silver	Bronze
Marta Domínguez; Spain	Liliya Shobukhova; Russia	Elvan Abeylegesse; Turkey

== Schedule ==
Date	Time	Round
August 12, 2006	17:15	Final

== Results ==
=== Final ===
Rank	Name	Nationality	Time	Notes
1st place, gold medalist(s)	Marta Domínguez	Spain	14:56.18	CR
2nd place, silver medalist(s)	Liliya Shobukhova	Russia	14:56.57	SB
3rd place, bronze medalist(s)	Elvan Abeylegesse	Turkey	14:59.29	SB
4	Jo Pavey	United Kingdom	15:01.41	
5	Volha Krautsova	Belarus	15:06.47	SB
6	Sabrina Mockenhaupt	Germany	15:11.38	SB
7	Susanne Wigene	Norway	15:11.79	
8	Krisztina Papp	Hungary	15:16.85	
9	Maria Protopappa	Greece	15:22.13	SB
10	Regina Rakhimkulova	Russia	15:22.50	PB
11	Nathalie De Vos	Belgium	15:22.68	PB
12	Mary Cullen	Ireland	15:25.80	PB
13	Nastassia Staravoitava	Belarus	15:55.74	
	Marie Davenport	Ireland		DNF
	Bouchra Ghezielle	France		DNF
