= 2006 IAAF World Indoor Championships – Women's 3000 metres =

The Women's 3000 metres event at the 2006 IAAF World Indoor Championships was held on March 11.

== Results ==
Rank	Name	Nationality	Time	Notes
1st place, gold medalist(s)	Meseret Defar	Ethiopia	8:38.80	
2nd place, silver medalist(s)	Liliya Shobukhova	Russia	8:42.18	
3rd place, bronze medalist(s)	Lidia Chojecka	Poland	8:42.59	SB
4	Sentayehu Ejigu	Ethiopia	8:43.38	PB
5	Olesya Syreva	Russia	8:44.10	
6	Mariem Alaoui Selsouli	Morocco	8:55.97	
7	Carrie Tollefson	United States	8:59.13	SB
8	Analía Rosa	Portugal	8:59.99	PB
9	Tetyana Kryvobok	Ukraine	9:02.87	
10	Maria McCambridge	Ireland	9:07.26	
11	Tetyana Holovchenko	Ukraine	9:08.24	
12	Sara Bei-Hall	United States	9:14.49	
13	Roisin McGettigan	Ireland	9:28.85	
