= Kate Tenforde =

American long-distance runner

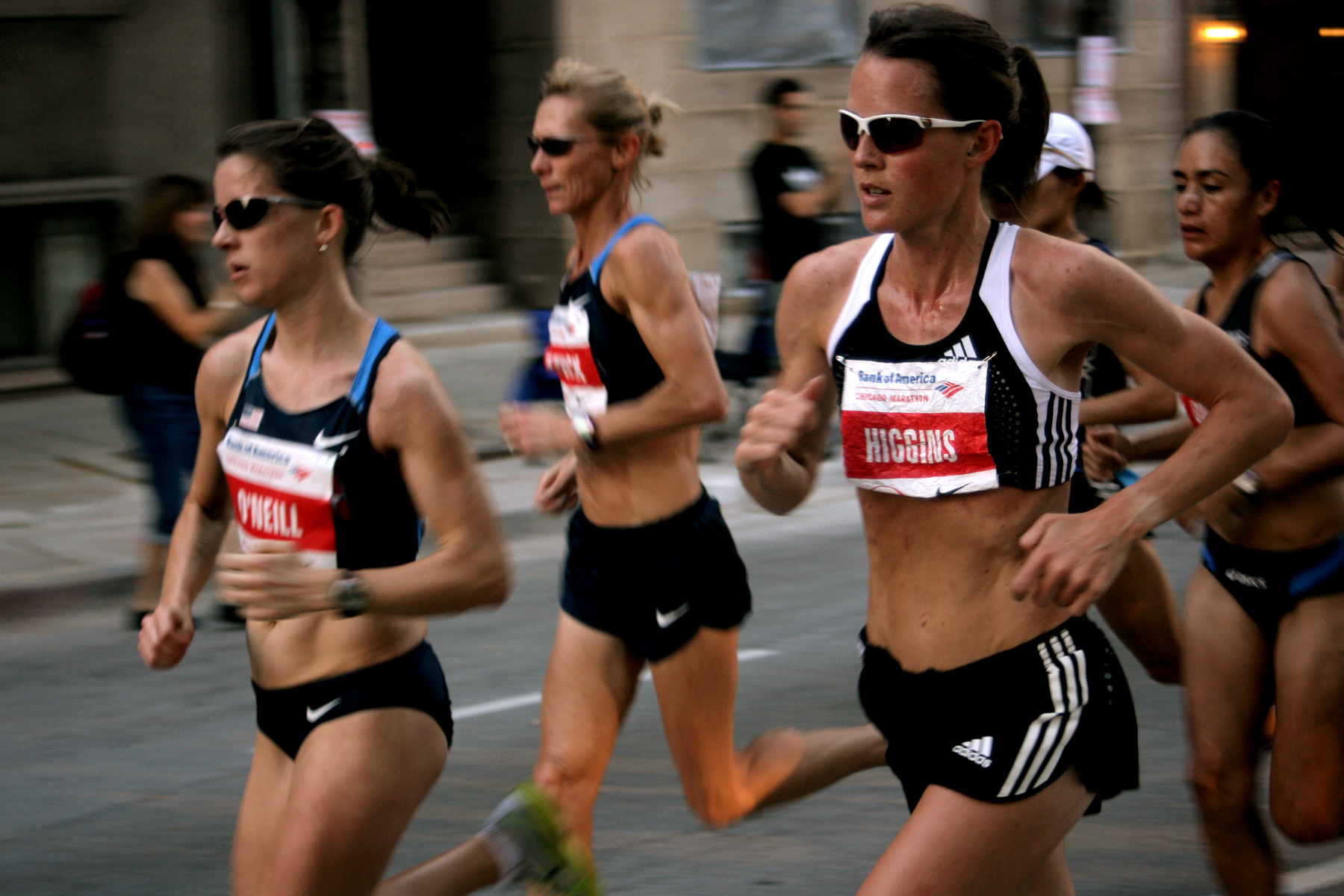
- Kate O'Neill (left) in the 2008 Chicago Marathon

Personal information
- Born: Kate O'Neill; July 29, 1980 (age 45) Milton, Massachusetts, U.S.
- Height: 5 ft 4 in (1.63 m)
- Weight: 108 lb (49 kg)
- Spouse: Adam Tenforde (m. 2010)

Sport
- Country: USA
- College team: Yale Bulldogs
- Turned pro: 2003
- Coached by: Mark Young

Achievements and titles
- Olympic finals: 2004, 10,000 m, 21st
- Personal bests: 3000 m: 9:07:74; 5000 m: 15.21.66; 10,000 m: 31:34.37; Half Marathon: 1:11:47; Marathon: 2:34:04
Medal record
Representing United States
Women's Athletics
World Marathon Majors
Bronze medal – third place	2007 Chicago	Marathon

Kate Tenforde (née O'Neill; born July 29, 1980) is an American long-distance runner from Milton, Massachusetts. She represented the United States in the 2004 Summer Olympics, competing in the 10,000 metres.

== Amateur career ==
Tenforde ran cross country and track and field at Yale University, where she was a three-time NCAA runner-up in Cross Country, 5000 m (indoor), and 10,000 m (outdoor). O'Neill earned All-American honors in both Cross Country and Outdoor track. Her twin sister, Laura, was also an All-American at Yale.

== Professional career ==
In 2004, after setting personal records in the 10,000 m and 5000 m, Tenforde finished third in the Olympic 10,000 m trials with a time of 32:07.25. This qualified her for the 2004 Summer Olympics. In Athens, she finished 21st with a time of 32:24.04.

=== Marathon ===
Tenforde later turned her focus to longer distance events, with an emphasis on the marathon. She was coached by Terrence Mahon, who coaches notable American marathoners Deena Kastor, Ryan Hall, and Jen Rhines. She had a strong marathon debut at the Chicago Marathon, finishing third with a time of 2:36:15. In January 2008, she won the 2008 USA half-marathon championship (1:11:57) at the Aramco Houston Half-Marathon. Tenforde was a favorite at the 2008 U.S. Olympic Marathon Trials, but a knee injury forced her to drop out at mile 21.

In 2009 Tenforde trained in Palo Alto, California, and was the first American finisher at the 2009 London Marathon, with a time of 2:34:48.

In September 2014, Tenforde won the annual San Francisco J.P. Morgan Corporate Challenge 5k.

== Personal ==
Tenforde married former Stanford Cardinal runner Adam Tenforde on November 20, 2010.

== Professional ==
From 2010 through 2015, Tenforde worked as a coach and product manager for runcoach to share her running expertise with recreational runners across the country. In 2016, she launched Beantown Running and began offering private coaching services to runners of all levels.
