= Carrie Tollefson =

American middle-distance runner

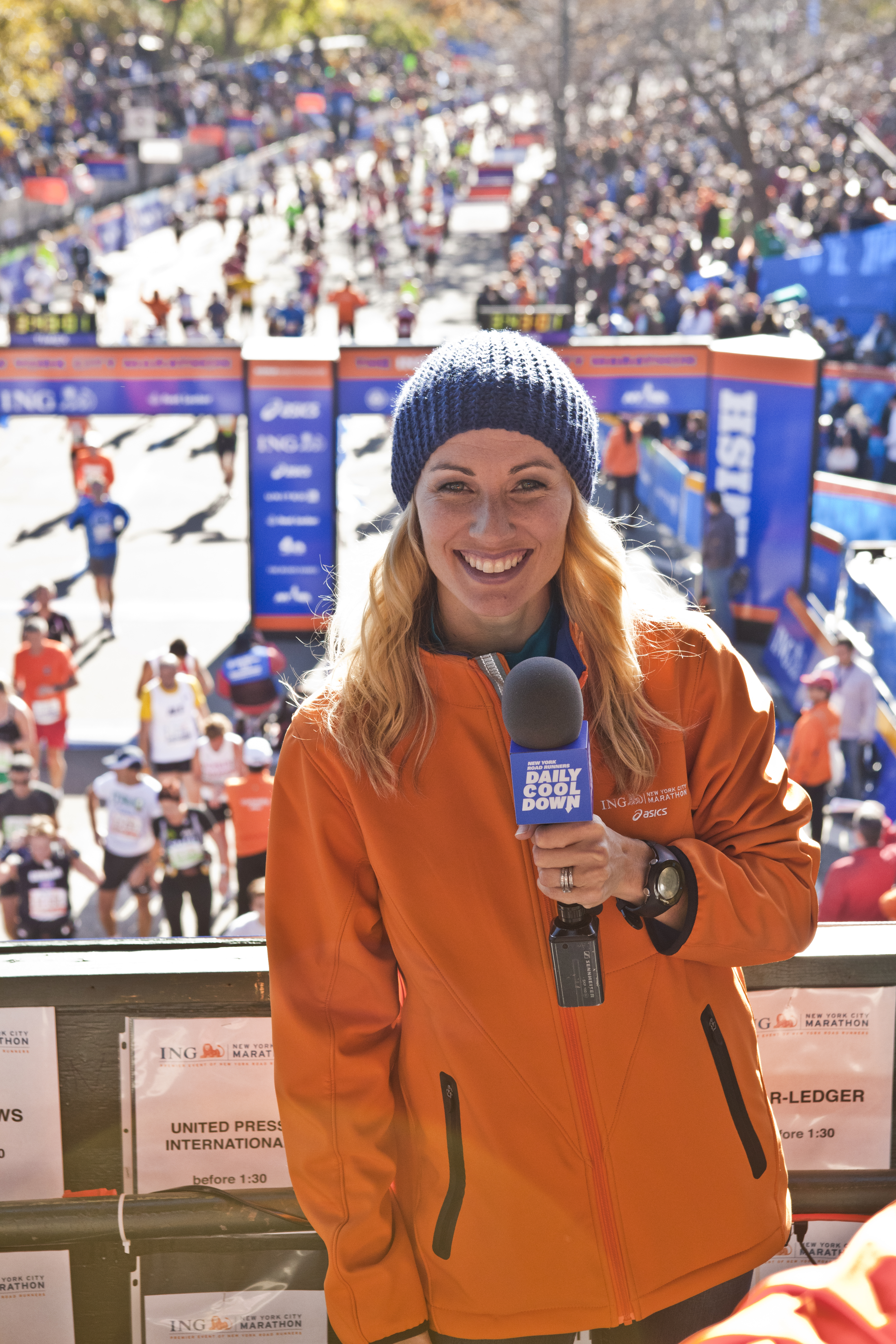
- Tollefson at the 2011 New York City Marathon

Personal information
- Full name: Carrie Anne Tollefson
- Born: January 18, 1977 (age 49) Dawson, Minnesota, U.S.

Carrie Anne Tollefson (born January 18, 1977, in Dawson, Minnesota) is an American former middle-distance runner who was on the US 2004 Summer Olympic team.

== Running career ==
Tollefson was raised in Dawson, a small town in western Minnesota. Running for Dawson-Boyd High School in Lac qui Parle County, she was a five-time state champion in cross-country from 1990 through 1994, setting a national record for the most consecutive state championships. She also won eight individual track and field titles in the 1600 and 3200 meters, and set a then-state record in the 3,200 meters in 1994 with a time of 10:30.28. Tollefson's thirteen individual titles in cross-country and track are the most in Minnesota history as of 2020.

Tollefson ran collegiately at Villanova University where she won the 1997 NCAA Cross Country Championships. In 1998, she returned to the championship race after surgery, and finished 11th as the first Villanova runner as she led her team to the 1998 championship.

She was also the 1999 NCAA Outdoor and Indoor 3000 meters and Outdoor 5000 meters champion. She graduated from Villanova with a communications degree in 1999.

At the US Olympic Trials in 2004, Tollefson won the 1500 meters. She was the only American athlete selected for the women's 1500m event at the Olympics, as neither the second- nor third-placed finishers at the trials had achieved Olympic "A" standard times. Tollefson competed in the 2004 Olympic Summer Games, making it to the semis in the 1500 meters.

In 2004, she was ranked No. 1 nationally by Track and Field News.

In 2006, Tollefson won the 4K race at the USA Cross Country Championships. She also won the 3000 meters at the 2006 US Indoor National Championships. At the 2006 IAAF World Indoor Championships in Moscow, Tollefson finished 7th in the 3000m.

== Post-competition career ==
In 2010, Tollefson began hosting a weekly online video show and podcast about running and fitness called C Tolle Run. Tollefson works as an analyst and commentator for a variety of outlets including ESPN2, NBC, and USATF.tv, covering events such as the New York City Marathon.

Tollefson began hosting a yearly summer distance camp for teens at St. Catherine University in 2007. She is a Global Reebok Running Ambassador.

Tollefson was inducted into the Minnesota High School Hall of Fame in 2015. She was inducted into the National High School Hall of Fame in 2018.

Tollefson is a product advocate for Body Togs, a company producing weighted sleeves for weight loss and exercising. In addition, she is a brand ambassador for St. Paul–based Hiway Credit Union, where she’s been a member for 20+ years.

== Personal life ==
Tollefson married Charlie Peterson in 2003. They have three children: Ruby (born 2010), Everett (born 2013), and Greer (born 2016).
