= Gete Wami =

Ethiopian long-distance runner

Medal record

Women's Athletics

Representing Ethiopia

Olympic Games
Silver medal – second place	2000 Sydney	10,000 m
Bronze medal – third place	1996 Atlanta	10,000 m
Bronze medal – third place	2000 Sydney	5000 m

World Championships
Gold medal – first place	1999 Seville	10,000 m
Bronze medal – third place	2001 Edmonton	10,000 m

Getenesh "Gete" Wami Degife (Amharic: ጌጤነሽ 'ጌጤ' ዋሚ ደግፌ born 28 January 1974 in Debre Berhan) is an Ethiopian former long-distance runner who competed in cross country, track, and road events.

Her brother, Mulugeta Wami, is also a professional marathon runner.

== Biography ==
Gete won the gold medal at the 1999 World Championships in Seville, with a time of 30:24.56, which was a new African record and Championships Record. She also won the 10,000 m gold medal at the 1999 All-Africa Games that year. She is a two-time winner of the IAAF World Cross Country Championships, having taken the long race title in 1996 and then the short race title in 2001.

Gete won the 2006 Berlin Marathon, finishing in front of Salina Kosgei and Monika Drybulska on 24 September. She was expected to beat the world record over 15 km during the Zevenheuvelenloop in and around Nijmegen on 19 November 2006, but failed. Gete finished in second position during the race, nine seconds behind Mestewat Tufa, who finished in 47:22.

In 2007, Gete won the Berlin Marathon again. She competed in the New York Marathon thirty-five days later and she finished 23 seconds behind Paula Radcliffe. Her second-place finish gave her the World Marathon Majors Series Title, earning herself the $500,000 jackpot.

In August 2008, Gete dropped out of the 2008 Beijing Olympic Marathon, after running in the lead pack for much of the race, as did her teammate Berhane Adere.

The last outing of her career came at the 2009 London Marathon, where she came in ninth with a time of 2:26:54.

== International competitions ==
Year	Competition	Venue	Position	Event	Notes
Representing Ethiopia
1992	World Junior Championships	Seoul, South Korea	2nd	10,000 m	32:41.57
1995	World Championships	Gothenburg, Sweden	18th	10,000 m	32:56.94
1996	Olympic Games	Atlanta, United States	3rd	10,000 m	31:06.65
1997	World Championships	Athens, Greece	—	10,000 m	DNF
1999	World Championships	Seville, Spain	1st	10,000 m	30:24.56
2000	Olympic Games	Sydney, Australia	3rd	5000 m	14:42.23
2000	Olympic Games	Sydney, Australia	2nd	10,000 m	30:22.48
2001	World Championships	Edmonton, Canada	3rd	10,000 m	31:49.98
2008	Olympic Games	Beijing, China	—	Marathon	DNF

== Road races ==
Year	Competition	Venue	Position	Notes
2002	Amsterdam Marathon	Amsterdam, Netherlands	1st	Marathon
2005	San Diego Rock 'n' Roll Marathon	San Diego, United States	1st	Marathon
2006	Berlin Marathon	Berlin, Germany	1st	Marathon
2006	Zevenheuvelenloop	Nijmegen, Netherlands	2nd	15K
2007	Berlin Marathon	Berlin, Germany	1st	Marathon
2007	New York City Marathon	New York City, United States	2nd	Marathon
2007	World Marathon Majors	Series	1st	Marathon

Sporting positions
Preceded by Gabriela Szabo	Women's 5.000m Best Year Performance; 2000	Succeeded by Olga Yegorova
