= Robert Kipkoech Cheruiyot =

Kenyan long-distance runner (born 1978)

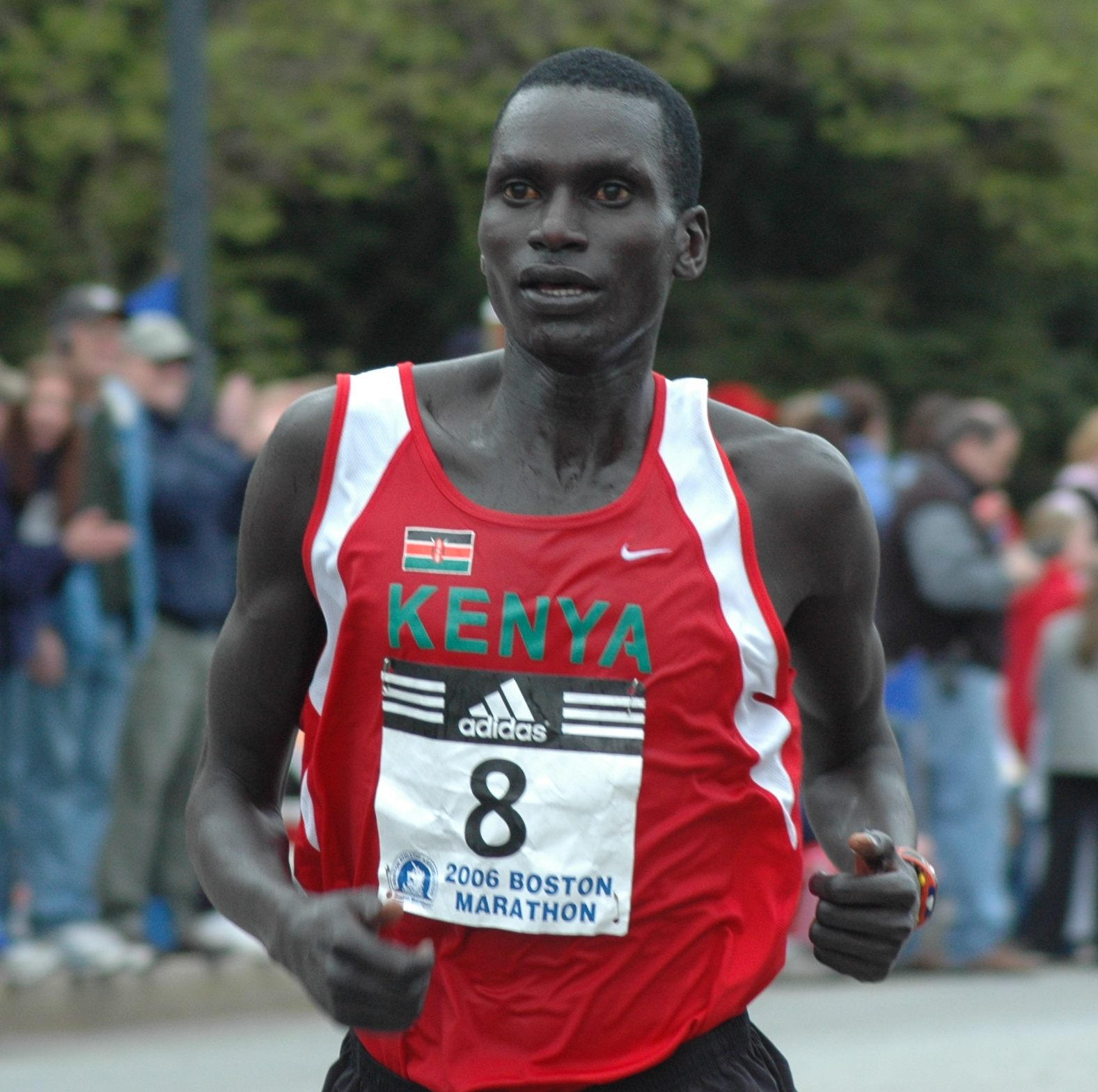

Personal information
- Born: 26 September 1978 (age 48) Kapsabet, Kenya
- Height: 1.90 m (6 ft 3 in)
- Weight: 70 kg (154 lb; 11 st 0 lb)

Sport
- Country: (Kenya)

Achievements and titles
- Personal bests: 10,000 metres: 27:48; Half Marathon: 1:00:05; Marathon: 2:07:14
Medal record
Representing Kenya
World Marathon Majors
| Gold medal – first place | 2008 Boston | Marathon |
| Gold medal – first place | 2007 Boston | Marathon |
| Gold medal – first place | 2006 Chicago | Marathon |
| Gold medal – first place | 2006 Boston | Marathon |
| Gold medal – first place | 2003 Boston | Marathon |

Robert "Mwafrika" Kipkoech Cheruiyot (born 26 September 1978 in Kapsabet, Kenya), sometimes known as Omar Ahmed, is a Kenyan marathon runner and is the former record holder and four-time winner of the Boston Marathon.

== Early career ==
Cheruiyot trained running while at school, but was unable to pay school fees and became a high school drop out. He ended up working at a barber shop in Mosoriot, but could hardly buy a meal with his low salary. Later he managed to access Moses Tanui's training camp in Kaptagat. Soon thereafter he made a breakthrough by winning a local 10K race in 2001 and headed for international competitions.

Cheruiyot won the Roma-Ostia Half Marathon in March 2002. His marathon debut, Milan Marathon in December 2002 saw three top finishers - Cheruiyot, Mike Rotich and Daniele Caimmi all posting the same time, 2:08:59 hours, but Cheruiyot emerged the winner. Cheruiyot also won the Saint Silvester Road Race at the end of 2002, the first one of three.

== Major marathons ==
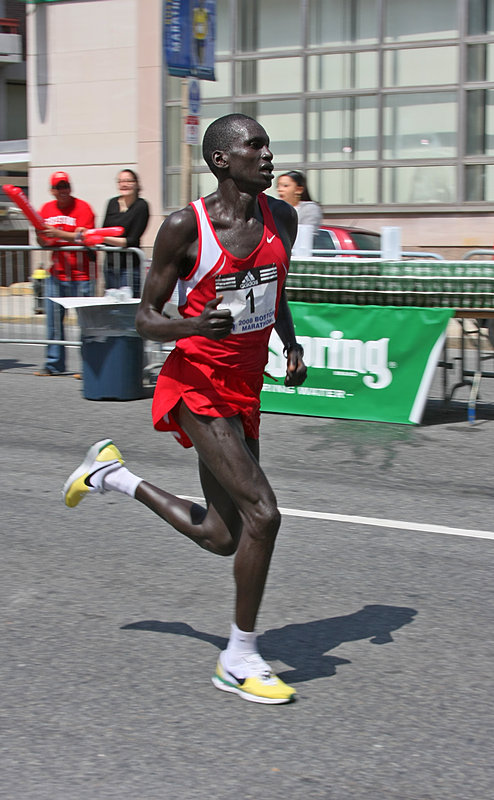
Robert Cheruiyot in 2008 Boston Marathon at Kilometer 40th

He won the Boston Marathon in 2003, 2006, 2007 and most recently in 2008. His 2006 Boston finishing time of 2:07:14 broke a Boston marathon course record set by Cosmas Ndeti that had lasted 12 years. His record was broken in the 2010 Boston Marathon by Robert Kiprono Cheruiyot (unrelated) with a finishing time of 2:05:52.

He finished 4th in the 2005 New York Marathon and 2nd in the 2009 New York Marathon. He sought to win another title in Boston in 2005 as well but only finished 5th that year.

During his win at Chicago in 2006, Cheruiyot did not actually break the tape at the finish line. He slipped at the end and crossed the finish line as he slipped forward making him the winner. It was ruled that he did cross the finish line in doing so. He injured his head against the ground in the fall and had to be helped from the course in a wheelchair. He suffered a brain contusion and was released from the hospital after two days of observation. His time of 2:07:35 was five seconds faster than 2nd-place finisher Daniel Njenga. The win in Chicago left him at the top of the 2006 World Marathon Majors standings and won its grand prize.

In 2007, Cheruiyot defended his title and won his third Boston Marathon with an official time of 2:14:13. Fellow Kenyans were second and third. It was the 15th time in the last 17 years that a Kenyan has won the Boston marathon but it was also the slowest Boston Marathon since 1977 as runners faced cold headwinds gusting up to 50 miles per hour. Cheruiyot also won $100,000 for the victory and gained a significant lead in the World Marathon Majors series.

On 21 April 2008 he won his fourth Boston Marathon title with a time of 2:07:45, making him the first four-time winner in the men's open division since Bill Rodgers (fellow Kenyan Catherine Ndereba recorded her fourth win in 2005).

In April 2009, Cheruiyot started the Boston Marathon but did not finish and was sent to the hospital.

He is not to be confused with Robert Kiprotich Cheruiyot or Robert Kiprono Cheruiyot, who are both also Kenyan marathon runners.

== Achievements ==
| Year | Competition | Venue | Position | Event | Notes |
Representing Kenya
| 2001 | Rotterdam Marathon | Rotterdam, Netherlands | 10th | Marathon | 2:10:41 |
| 2001 | Reims Marathon | Reims, France | 1st | Marathon | 2:13:17 |
| 2002 | Milan Marathon | Milan, Italy | 1st | Marathon | 2:08:59 |
| 2002 | Paris Marathon | Paris, France | 4th | Marathon | 2:09:39 |
| 2003 | Boston Marathon | Boston, United States | 1st | Marathon | 2:10:11 |
| 2003 | Milan Marathon | Milan, Italy | 3rd | Marathon | 2:11:07 |
| 2004 | Chicago Marathon | Chicago, United States | 12th | Marathon | 2:14:23 |
| 2005 | Boston Marathon | Boston, United States | 5th | Marathon | 2:14:30 |
| 2005 | New York City Marathon | New York, United States | 4th | Marathon | 2:11:01 |
| 2006 | Boston Marathon | Boston, United States | 1st | Marathon | 2:07:14 |
| 2006 | Chicago Marathon | Chicago, United States | 1st | Marathon | 2:07:35 |
| 2007 | Boston Marathon | Boston, United States | 1st | Marathon | 2:14:13 |
| 2007 | Chicago Marathon | Chicago, United States | 4th | Marathon | 2:16:13 |
| 2007 | Macao Marathon | Macao, China | 3rd | Marathon | 2:18:36 |
| 2008 | Boston Marathon | Boston, United States | 1st | Marathon | 2:07:45 |
| 2009 | 2009 World Championships | Berlin, Germany | 5th | Marathon | 2:10:46 |
| 2009 | Incheon Bridge Opening Commemorative Marathon | Incheon, South Korea | 3rd | Marathon | 2:14:29 |
| 2009 | New York City Marathon | New York, United States | 2nd | Marathon | 2:09:56 |
| 2011 | Shanghai Marathon | Shanghai, China | 7th | Marathon | 2:12:35 |

== See also ==
- List of winners of the Boston Marathon

Sporting positions
| Preceded by Incumbent | Rotterdam Men's Half Marathon Winner; 2004 | Succeeded by (Kenya) Samuel Kamau Wanjiru |
