= Irina Mikitenko =

German long-distance runner

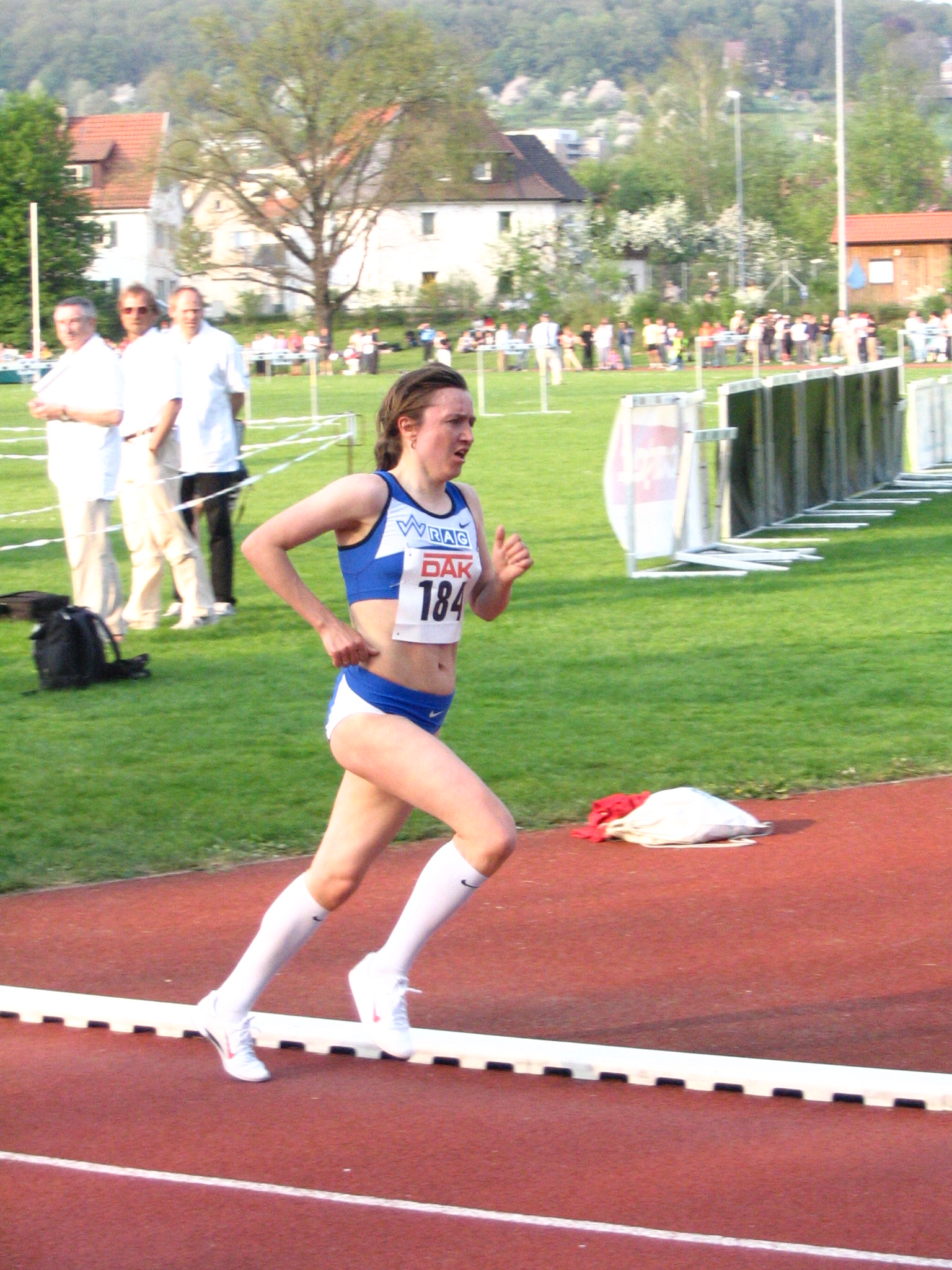
- Mikitenko winning the German 10,000 metres Championship in 2006

Personal information
- Born: August 23, 1972 (age 54) Bakanas, Kazakh SSR, Soviet Union
- Height: 1.61 m (5 ft 3 in)
- Weight: 48 kg (106 lb)

Sport
- Country: Germany
- Sport: Athletics
- Event: Marathon

Irina Leonidovna Mikitenko (née Volynskaya; Russian: Ирина Леонидовна Волынская (Микитенко); born 23 August 1972) is a retired German long-distance runner who competed in marathons. She won the Berlin Marathon in 2008 and is a two-time winner of the London Marathon. She has competed at the Summer Olympics on four occasions.

Mikitenko was a track specialist in the early part of her career, running in distances from 3000 metres to 10,000 metres. She represented Kazakhstan at the 1996 Atlanta Olympics in the 5000 metres but migrated to Germany soon after. Taking up German citizenship, she ran German records in the 3000 m (8:30.39 minutes) and 5000 m (14:42.03 minutes). She came close to a major 5000 m medal on several occasions: at the World Championships in Athletics she was fourth in 1999 and fifth in 2001, while at the 2000 Summer Olympics took fifth place. After a seventh-place finish in the event at the 2004 Summer Olympics she took a career break to have a child.

Upon her return to competition she began focusing on road running events. The change up to the marathon brought the greatest success of her career. A run of 2:19:19 hours to win the Berlin Marathon made her the fourth fastest woman ever at that point. Her win in London the year after in 2:22:11 hours was the fastest that year. With consistent marathon performances, she secured three consecutive World Marathon Majors title in both the 2007–08, 2008–09, and 2009–10 seasons. She entered her first Olympic marathon in 2012 and came fourteenth.

== Early career ==
Mikitenko began participating in long-distance running at the age of 14. Under her maiden name of Volynskaya, she represented Kazakhstan in the 5,000 metres at the 1996 Olympic Games, but failed to make the finals. Since she has German ancestors, she and her husband immigrated in 1996 to the German state of Hesse.

In 1998, she became the German record holder in the 10,000 metres, and the year after, in the 5,000 metres. In the 5,000 metres, she bettered Kathrin Weßel's time of 14:54.32 with her fourth-place time of 14:50.17 at the 1999 World Athletics Championships. On 7 September of the same year, she improved her own German record to 14:42.03 minutes in Berlin.

A year later, Mikitenko became the German champion in cross-country running, defending her national title over 5,000 metres. She won twice consecutively at Luxembourg's prestigious Eurocross meeting in 1999 and 2000. In August 2000, she broke the 17-year-old record of Brigitte Kraus in the 3,000 metres. She placed fifth in the 5,000 metres at the 2000 Olympic Games in Sydney, and finished in the same position at the 2001 World Athletics Championships in Edmonton.

In 2003, she won the Paderborner Osterlauf, a 10-km road-running race in Germany, finishing in a record time of 31:28 minutes. She also won the Bietigheimer Silvesterlauf race that year, and participated in the 5,000 metres at the 2004 Olympic Games.

== Marathon running ==
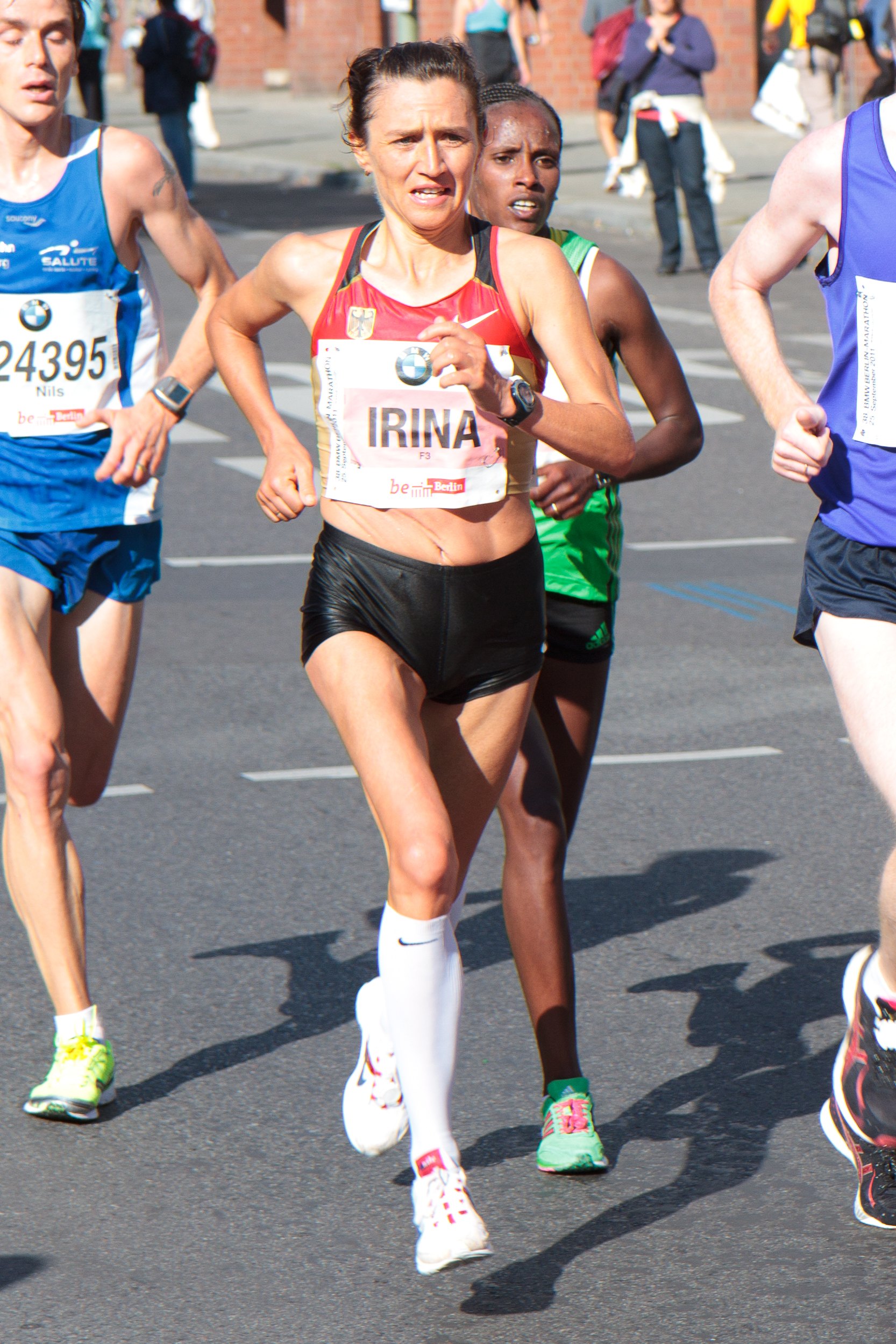
Mikitenko during Berlin Marathon 2011

After having a baby, Mikitenko returned to competition in 2006, again becoming the German champion in the 5,000 and 10,000 metres. In the 2006 European Championships, she placed ninth, one place behind long-time rival Sabrina Mockenhaupt.

In 2007, she placed second behind Benita Johnson in the Berlin Half Marathon, achieving a personal-best time of 1:09:46 hours. In September 2007 she made her marathon debut at the Berlin Marathon, finishing second and qualifying for the 2008 Summer Olympics.

In April 2008, at only her second international marathon, she won the women's London Marathon in a time of 2:24:12. She withdrew from the 2008 Summer Olympics in Beijing due to hip problems causing pain whilst running on 1 August 2008. Healthy again, on 28 September, she improved her own German record with a win at the Berlin Marathon, almost by five minutes to 2:19:19, making her number four on the women's marathon all-time list. This time is the world record in the Masters W 35-39 category. She improved the world record formerly set by Lyudmila Petrova at the London Marathon on 23 April 2006. The previous world record was 2:21:29.

On 2 November 2008, Mikitenko won the jackpot prize of 500,000 $US of the World Marathon Majors (WMM) for the best performer in New York, London, Chicago, Berlin and Boston within the last two years. After twelve competitions she was in a tie with Ethiopia's Gete Wami with 65 points each, but the organisation voted her the winner, awarding her the prize because she had competed in only three races, compared to Wami's four.

She repeated her performance at the London Marathon in 2009, finishing with a time of 2:22:11, one minute ahead of Britain's Mara Yamauchi. Following the death of her father in July, Mikitenko struggled to find form in the buildup to the 2009 World Championships. Jurgen Mallow, director for the German athletics team, said her withdrawal was a blow for the team hosting the championships, stating that she "did not manage to hit World Championship form in the St. Moritz altitude training camp. We are very, very sad about this". Finally she participated in the October 2009 Chicago Marathon, winning with an official time of 2:26:31 and won the half-million dollar WMM jackpot for a second consecutive year.

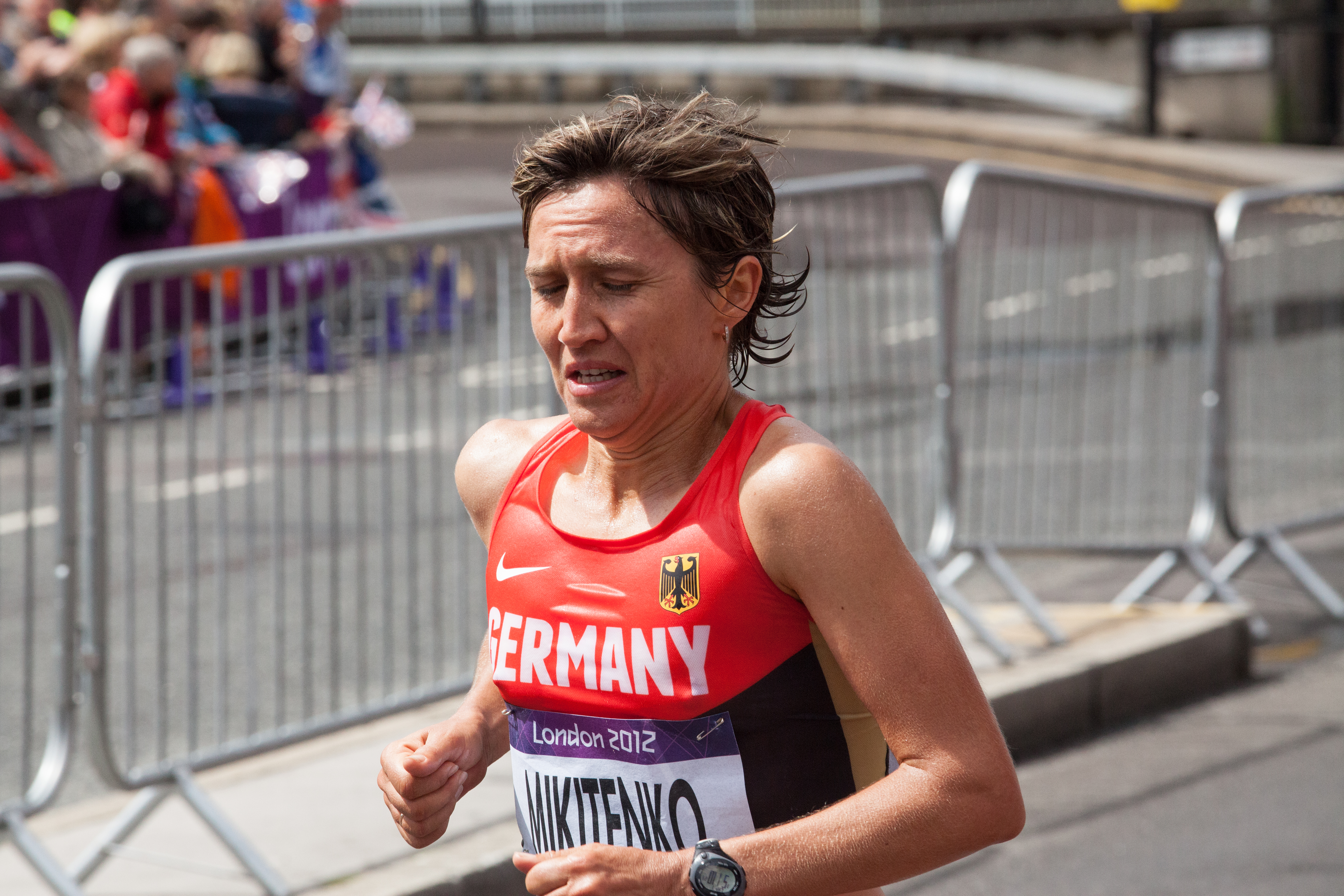
Mikitenko competing at her fourth Olympics in London in 2012

She had a seven-month lay-off after the Chicago run and decided not to run at the Paderborn 10K, which was her preparation for the 2010 London Marathon, due to sore shins. She attempted to defend her London title but her shin problems persisted and she dropped out mid-race – a fate which also befell defending men's champion Samuel Wanjiru. She signed up for the 2010 Chicago Marathon but, despite having the fastest time in qualifying, she faded in the second half of the race and ended up in fourth place. She claimed her third consecutive WMM jackpot.

She claimed victory at the 2011 Parelloop 10K in April. Running at the 2011 London Marathon, she could not keep pace with the race leaders and ended the race in seventh while Mary Keitany won the race with a time equal to Mikitenko's best. Her season went well from there on, however: she won the Avon Frauenlauf and Berlin 10K races and was runner-up to Florence Kiplagat at the 2011 Berlin Marathon in a time of 2:22:18 hours. She had two marathon outings in 2012. Her fastest was a run of 2:24:53 for seventh at the 2012 London Marathon, making her the fastest European in the race. She returned to the city later that August to compete in the 2012 Olympic marathon, where she placed 14th overall.

She took third place at the 2013 Tokyo Marathon (a new addition to the World Marathon Majors circuit).

At the Berlin Marathon 2013, she finished 3rd behind the winner Florence Kiplagat and Sharon Cherop. The time of crossing the finish line in 2:24:54 is a world record in the Masters 40 division.

In 2014, she announced her retirement from professional running in a press conference in the context of the 2014 Berlin Marathon.

== Personal life ==
Her daughter Vanessa Mikitenko is also a distance runner and her father-in-law Leonid Mykytenko competed for the Soviet Union.

== Major honors ==
World Marathon Majors title: 2007-08, 2009-09, 2009-10 seasons.

== Personal bests ==
- 800 metres – 2:09.97 min (1998)
- 1500 metres – 4:06.08 min (2001)
- 3000 metres – 8:30.39 min (2000)
- 5000 metres – 14:42.03 min (1999)
- 10,000 metres – 31:29.55 min (2001)
- 10K run (road) – 30:57 min (2008)
- Half marathon – 68:51 min (2008)
- Marathon – 2:19:19 hrs (2008)
