= Lyudmila Petrova =

Russian long-distance runner

Lyudmila Nikolayevna Petrova (Russian: Людмила Николаевна Петрова; born 7 October 1968) is a Russian long-distance runner, who represented her native country at two Summer Olympics: 1996 and 2004. She won the 2000 edition of the New York City Marathon.

== Biography ==
She was born in Karakly and represents the club Novocheboksary Profsoyuzy. On the track the finished tenth in the 3000 metres at the 1996 European Indoor Championships, fourteenth in the 10,000 metres at the 1996 Olympic Games and sixth at the 2001 World Championships. She became Russian 10,000 metres champion in 1996, and indoor 3000 metres champion in the same year.

Her personal best times were 8.59.15 minutes in the 3000 metres (indoor), achieved at the 1996 European Indoor Championships in Stockholm; 15.20.44 minutes in the 5000 metres, achieved in July 1996 in Saint Petersburg; and 31:36.76 minutes in the 10,000 metres, achieved in May 2003 in Palo Alto.

She has specialized in road running. In the international championships she finished ninth at the 1998 European Championships, and eighth at the 2004 Olympic Games. She also finished seventh at the 1999 World Half Marathon Championships, eighteenth at the 1999 World Half Marathon Championships and thirteenth at the 2002 World Half Marathon Championships.

In the great city marathons she has had success at the New York and London Marathons. She won the 2000 New York City Marathon with the time of 2:25:45 hours. In 2001, she finished sixth in 2:26:18 hours. She finished third at the 2002 London Marathon in 2:22:33 hours, fourth at the 2003 New York City Marathon in 2:25:00 hours and second at the 2006 London Marathon in 2:21:29 hours. In 2008, she finished second at the New York City Marathon in 2:25:43 hours and fifth in the London Marathon in 2:26:45 hours. She then finished second again, at the 2009 New York City Marathon in the time of 2:29:00 hours.
