= Berhane Adere =

Ethiopian long-distance runner

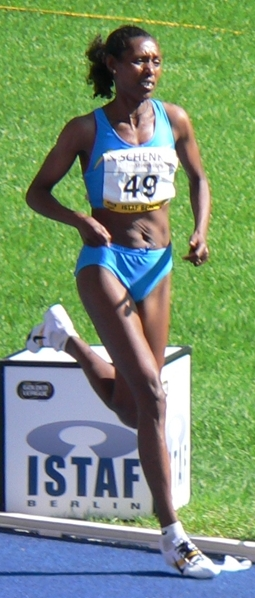
- Berhane Adere

Personal information
- Full name: Berhane Adere Debala
- Born: 21 July 1973 (age 53) Shewa, Ethiopia

Sport
- Country: Ethiopia
- Sport: Track and field
- Event: Long-distance running
Medal record
Women's athletics
Representing Ethiopia
World Championships
Gold medal – first place	2003 Paris	10,000 m
Silver medal – second place	2001 Edmonton	10,000 m
Silver medal – second place	2005 Helsinki	10,000 m
World Indoor Championships
Gold medal – first place	2003 Birmingham	3000 m
Silver medal – second place	2004 Budapest	3000 m
World Cup
Gold medal – first place	2002 Madrid	3000 m
Bronze medal – third place	1998 Johannesburg	5000 m
African Championships
Gold medal – first place	1993 Durban	10,000 m
Gold medal – first place	1998 Dakar	5000 m
Gold medal – first place	2002 Radès	5000 m
World Half Marathon Championships
Gold medal – first place	2002 Brussels	Half marathon
Silver medal – second place	2003 Vilamoura	Half marathon
Bronze medal – third place	2001 Bristol	Half marathon
World Marathon Majors
Gold medal – first place	2006 Chicago	Marathon
Gold medal – first place	2007 Chicago	Marathon
Bronze medal – third place	2009 Chicago	Marathon

Berhane Adere Debala (Ge'ez: ብርሀኔ አደሬ born 21 July 1973) is a retired Ethiopian long-distance runner who specialised in the 10,000 metres and half marathon. She won the gold medal in the 10,000 m at the 2003 World Championships and silver medals in the event at the 2001 and 2005 World Championships. Berhane claimed gold and silver for the 3,000 metres at the 2003 and 2004 World Indoor Championships, respectively. Her medal in 2003 was Ethiopia's first world indoor medal in a women's event. At the half marathon, she was the world champion in 2002, took silver in 2003 and bronze in 2001. She won the Chicago Marathon in 2006 and 2007.

Berhane held the world indoor record for the 3,000 m, set in 2002, which was the first sub-8:30 mark run by a woman indoors and the first world indoor record in a distance event by an Ethiopian woman. She also held the world indoor record in the 5,000 m, set in 2004.

Berhane works for UNICEF as a goodwill ambassador for girls' education.

== Career ==
Berhane held the African record for the 10,000 metres in a time of 30:04.18, set at the 2003 World Championships, where she won gold. Her record was broken at the 2008 Beijing Olympics by Tirunesh Dibaba, who became the first African woman to run under 30 minutes in the event.

She won the 2006 Chicago Marathon with a personal best time of 2:20:42. She won the Chicago Marathon again in 2007 and the Dubai Marathon on 18 January 2008. Berhane also claimed victory in the 2007 Ras Al Khaimah Half Marathon.

She was the top female finisher in the 2010 Rock ‘n’ Roll Mardi Gras Marathon, in which she recorded the fastest ever half marathon on American soil with a time of 1:07:52, breaking her previous best by over 25 seconds. At age 36, that should also be the Masters world record. She saw off a challenge from Ana Dulce Félix to win at the Great North Run in September, completing the half marathon in 1:08:49. In 2012, she had two races, both in October in Britain, where she was runner-up at the Great Birmingham Run and third at the Great South Run.

== Achievements ==
=== International competitions ===
Representing Ethiopia
Year	Competition	Venue	Position	Event	Result
1991	World Cross Country Championships	Antwerp, Belgium	34th	XC 6425 m	21:30
1991	World Cross Country Championships	Antwerp, Belgium	2nd	Team	36 pts
1992	World Cross Country Championships	Boston, United States	38th	XC 6370 m	22:19
1992	World Cross Country Championships	Boston, United States	3rd	Team	96 pts
1993	African Championships	Durban, South Africa	1st	10,000 m	32:48.52
1993	World Championships	Stuttgart, Germany	27th (h)	10,000 m	33:20.62
1995	World Championships	Gothenburg, Sweden	22nd (h)	10,000 m	33:14.76
1996	World Cross Country Championships	Stellenbosch, South Africa	10th	XC 6300 m	20:37
1996	World Cross Country Championships	Stellenbosch, South Africa	2nd	Team	44 pts
1996	Olympic Games	Atlanta, GA, United States	18th	10,000 m	32:57.35
1997	World Cross Country Championships	Turin, Italy	14th	XC 6600 m	21:37
1997	World Cross Country Championships	Turin, Italy	1st	Team	24 pts
1997	World Championships	Athens, Greece	4th	10,000 m	31:48.95 PB
1998	African Championships	Dakar, Senegal	1st	5000 m	15:54.31 CR
1998	World Cup	Johannesburg, South Africa	3rd	5000 m	16:38.81
1999	World Championships	Seville, Spain	7th	10,000 m	31:32.51 PB
2000	World Cross Country Championships	Vilamoura, Portugal	14th	XC 8080 m	27:11
2000	World Cross Country Championships	Vilamoura, Portugal	1st	Team	20 pts
2000	Olympic Games	Sydney, Australia	12th	10,000 m	31:40.52
2001	World Championships	Edmonton, Australia	2nd	10,000 m	31:48.85
2001	World Half Marathon Championships	Bristol, United Kingdom	3rd	Individual	1:08:17 PB
2001	World Half Marathon Championships	Bristol, United Kingdom	3rd	Team	3:30:20
2002	World Half Marathon Championships	Brussels, Belgium	1st	Individual	1:09:06
2002	World Half Marathon Championships	Brussels, Belgium	3rd	Team	3:30:58
2002	African Championships	Radès, Tunisia	1st	5000 m	15:51.08
2002	World Cup	Madrid, Spain	1st	3000 m	8:50.88
2003	World Indoor Championships	Birmingham, United Kingdom	1st	3000 m	8:40.25
2003	World Championships	Saint-Denis, France	10th	5000 m	14:58.07
2003	World Championships	Saint-Denis, France	1st	10,000 m	30:04.18 CR
2003	World Half Marathon Championships	Vilamoura, Portugal	2nd	Individual	1:09:02
2003	World Half Marathon Championships	Vilamoura, Portugal	4th	Team	3:36:37
2004	World Indoor Championships	Budapest, Hungary	2nd	3000 m	9:11.43
2005	World Championships	Helsinki, Finland	2nd	10,000 m	30:25.41 SB
2008	Olympic Games	Beijing, China	–	Marathon	DNF
World Marathon Majors
2006	London Marathon	London, United Kingdom	4th	Marathon	2:21:52
2006	Chicago Marathon	Chicago, IL, United States	1st	Marathon	2:20:42
2007	Chicago Marathon	Chicago, IL, United States	1st	Marathon	2:33:49
2008	London Marathon	London, United Kingdom	7th	Marathon	2:27:42
2009	London Marathon	London, United Kingdom	5th	Marathon	2:25:30
2009	Chicago Marathon	Chicago, IL, United States	3rd	Marathon	2:28:38

=== Personal bests ===
- 3000 metres – 8:25.62 (Zürich 2001)
  - 3000 metres indoor – 8:29.15 (Stuttgart 2002)
- 5000 metres – 14:29.32 (Oslo 2003)
  - 5000 metres indoor – 14:39.29 (Stuttgart 2004)
- 10,000 metres – 30:04.18 (Paris-Saint-Denis 2003)

Road

- 5 kilometres – 14:54 (Carlsbad, CA 2003)
- 10 kilometres – 31:07 (Manchester 2006)
- Half marathon – 1:07:52 (New Orleans, LA 2010)
- Marathon – 2:20:42 (Chicago, IL 2006)

Sporting positions
Preceded by Paula Radcliffe	Women's 5,000 m Best Year Performance; 2003	Succeeded by Elvan Abeylegesse
Preceded by Lyubov Morgunova; Lydia Cheromei	Zevenheuvelenloop Women's Winner (15 km); 2000; 2005	Succeeded by Rose Cheruiyot; Mestawet Tufa
Preceded by Mara Yamauchi	Rotterdam Women's Half Marathon Winner; 2007	Succeeded by Lydia Cheromei
