= 2007 World Marathon Cup =

World Marathon Cup in Osaka

The 2007 World Marathon Cup was the 12th edition of the World Marathon Cup of athletics and were held in Osaka, Japan, inside of the 2007 World Championships.

== Results ==
Team men
#	Nations	Time
1	Japan	6:54:23
2	South Korea	7:12:08
3	Kenya	7:12:33

Team women
#	Nations	Time
1	Kenya	7:35:02
2	China	7:35:52
3	Japan	7:37:39

Individual men
#	Athlete	Time	Notes
1st place, gold medalist(s)	Luke Kibet (KEN)	2:15:59	
2nd place, silver medalist(s)	Mubarak Hassan Shami (QAT)	2:17:18	
3rd place, bronze medalist(s)	Viktor Röthlin (SUI)	2:17:25	
4	Yared Asmerom (ERI)	2:17:41	
5	Tsuyoshi Ogata (JPN)	2:17:42	SB
6	Satoshi Osaki (JPN)	2:18:06	SB
7	Toshinari Suwa (JPN)	2:18:35	SB
8	William Kiplagat (KEN)	2:19:21	
9	Janne Holmén (FIN)	2:19:36	
10	José Manuel Martínez (ESP)	2:20:25	

Individual women
#	Athlete	Time	Notes
1st place, gold medalist(s)	Catherine Ndereba (KEN)	2:30:37	SB
2nd place, silver medalist(s)	Zhou Chunxiu (CHN)	2:30:45	
3rd place, bronze medalist(s)	Reiko Tosa (JPN)	2:30:55	SB
4	Zhu Xiaolin (CHN)	2:31:21	
5	Lidia Șimon (ROM)	2:31:26	SB
6	Kiyoko Shimahara (JPN)	2:31:40	SB
7	Rita Jeptoo (KEN)	2:32:03	SB
8	Edith Masai (KEN)	2:32:22	
9	Mara Yamauchi (GBR)	2:32:55	
10	Lyubov Morgunova (RUS)	2:33:41	

== See also ==
- 2007 World Championships in Athletics – Men's Marathon
- 2007 World Championships in Athletics – Women's Marathon
