= Athletics at the 2006 Asian Games – Men's marathon =

Men's marathon at the 2006 Asian Games
- Venue: Doha Corniche
- Date: 10 December 2006
- Competitors: 22 from 15 nations

Medalists
gold medal	Mubarak Hassan Shami	Qatar
silver medal	Khalid Kamal Yaseen	Bahrain
bronze medal	Satoshi Osaki	Japan

The men's marathon at the 2006 Asian Games in Doha, Qatar was held on 10 December 2006 at the Marathon Street Circuit in Doha Corniche.

== Schedule ==
All times are Arabia Standard Time (UTC+03:00)

Date	Time	Event
Sunday, 10 December 2006	09:10	Final

== Records ==
Prior to this competition, the existing world, Asian and Games records were as follows.

World Record	Paul Tergat (KEN)	2:04:55	Berlin, Germany	28 September 2003
Asian Record	Toshinari Takaoka (JPN)	2:06:16	Chicago, United States	13 October 2002
Games Record	Takeyuki Nakayama (JPN)	2:08:21	Seoul, South Korea	5 October 1986

== Results ==
Legend

- DNF — Did not finish

Rank	Athlete	Time	Notes
1st place, gold medalist(s)	Mubarak Hassan Shami (QAT)	2:12:44	
2nd place, silver medalist(s)	Khalid Kamal Yaseen (BRN)	2:15:36	
3rd place, bronze medalist(s)	Satoshi Osaki (JPN)	2:15:36	
4	Satoshi Irifune (JPN)	2:17:24	
5	Ahmed Jumah Jaber (QAT)	2:17:43	
6	Su Wei (CHN)	2:18:55	
7	Ji Young-jun (KOR)	2:19:35	
8	Ri Kum-song (PRK)	2:20:19	
9	Ri Kyong-chol (PRK)	2:23:46	
10	Chang Chia-che (TPE)	2:23:50	
11	Arjun Kumar Basnet (NEP)	2:23:55	
12	Eduardo Buenavista (PHI)	2:24:50	
13	Valery Pisarev (KGZ)	2:25:46	
14	Kim Yi-yong (KOR)	2:27:11	
15	Ajith Bandara (SRI)	2:27:19	
16	Deng Haiyang (CHN)	2:29:39	
17	Bat-Ochiryn Ser-Od (MGL)	2:31:00	
18	Nguyễn Chí Đông (VIE)	2:34:29	
19	Alin Soares (TLS)	2:58:28	
—	Boonchu Chandecha (THA)	DNF	
—	Jirasak Suthichat (THA)	DNF	
—	Abdelhak Zakaria (BRN)	DNF	
