= Athletics at the 2008 Summer Olympics – Men's marathon =

Men's marathon at the Games of the XXIX Olympiad
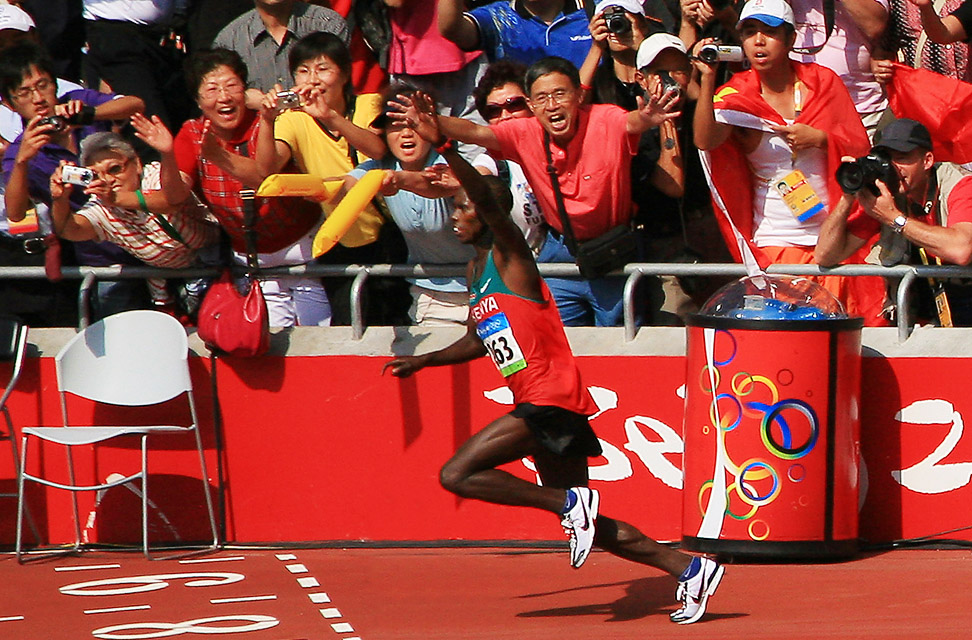
- Samuel Wanjiru
- Venue: Beijing
- Dates: August 24
- Competitors: 95 from 56 nations
- Winning time: 2:06:32 OR

Medalists
1st place, gold medalist(s)		Samuel Wanjiru; Kenya
2nd place, silver medalist(s)		Jaouad Gharib; Morocco
3rd place, bronze medalist(s)		Tsegay Kebede; Ethiopia

The men's marathon at the 2008 Summer Olympics took place on 24 August at 7:30am in Beijing, ending in the Beijing National Stadium. It was (as of today) the last time in Summer Olympics history that the start and/or finish of the men's marathon route was located inside the Olympic Stadium. Ninety-five athletes from 56 nations competed. The winner of the event was Samuel Wanjiru of Kenya, who set an Olympic record in the time of two hours, six minutes, and 32 seconds. It was Kenya's first victory in the men's marathon. Morocco won its first medal in the event since 1960, with Jaouad Gharib's silver. Tsegay Kebede of Ethiopia took bronze.

== Summary ==
It began in the early morning instead of the traditional late at night start. Through 10k, a group of 8 was at front. They were all broken down to five at 20k. At the front was Eritrean Yonas Kifle, Ethiopian Deriba Merga, Kenya's Martin Lel and Sammy Wanjiru, and Moroccan Jaouad Gharib. over the next 10k Deriba Merga started to press the pace, dropping Lel and Kifle. Just after 30k, Sammy Wanjiru attacked Deriba Merga who would crack and fade out of the medals. Sammy Wanjiru continued to sustain his gap back to Gharib. Gharib slowly reeled the deficit back but Wanjiru won the gold medal in an Olympic record 2:06:32. Gharib got silver, and Tsegaye Kebede pulled himself into third to take the bronze.

== Background ==
This was the 26th appearance of the event, which is one of 12 athletics events to have been held at every Summer Olympics. The defending champion, Stefano Baldini of Italy, was the only returning runner from the top ten finishers in the 2004 marathon. The reigning champion (from 2007) was Luke Kibet Bowen of Kenya; he had been injured during rioting in Kenya and had not yet regained top form, but did enter as an injury replacement. Jaouad Gharib of Morocco had won the 2003 and 2005 world championships; he competed in Beijing. The favorite would have been well-established 10,000 metres runner Haile Gebrselassie of Ethiopia, who had started competing in marathons in 2005 and broken the world record at the 2007 Berlin race; Haile did not run in Beijing due to air quality concerns. The race was thus "wide open."

Eritrea, Kazakhstan, and Montenegro each made their first appearance in Olympic men's marathons. The United States made its 25th appearance, most of any nation, having missed only the boycotted 1980 Games.

== Qualification ==
Each National Olympic Committee (NOC) was able to enter up to three entrants providing they had met the A qualifying standard (2:15:00) in the qualifying period (1 January 2007 to 23 July 2008). NOCs were also permitted to enter one athlete providing he had met the B standard (2:18:00) in the same qualifying period. The maximum number of athletes per nation had been set at 3 since the 1930 Olympic Congress.

== Competition format and course ==
As all Olympic marathons, the competition was a single race. The marathon distance of 26 miles, 385 yards was run over a point-to-point route.

== Records ==
Prior to this competition, the existing world and Olympic records were as follows:

World record	Haile Gebrselassie (ETH)	2:04:26	Berlin, Germany	28 September 2007
Olympic record	Carlos Lopes (POR)	2:09:21	Los Angeles, United States	12 August 1984

Samuel Wanjiru set a new Olympic record at 2:06:32.

== Schedule ==
All times are China Standard Time (UTC+8)

Date	Time	Round
Sunday, 24 August 2008	7:30	Final

== Results ==
Seventy-six runners finished; 19 did not.

Rank	Athlete	Nation	Time	Notes
1st place, gold medalist(s)	Samuel Wanjiru	Kenya	2:06:32	OR
2nd place, silver medalist(s)	Jaouad Gharib	Morocco	2:07:16	
3rd place, bronze medalist(s)	Tsegaye Kebede	Ethiopia	2:10:00	
4	Deriba Merga	Ethiopia	2:10:21	
5	Martin Lel	Kenya	2:10:24	
6	Viktor Röthlin	Switzerland	2:10:35	
7	Gashaw Asfaw	Ethiopia	2:10:52	
8	Yared Asmerom	Eritrea	2:11:11	
9	Dathan Ritzenhein	United States	2:11:59	
10	Ryan Hall	United States	2:12:33	
11	Mike Fokoroni	Zimbabwe	2:13:17	PB
12	Stefano Baldini	Italy	2:13:25	
13	Tsuyoshi Ogata	Japan	2:13:26	SB
14	Grigoriy Andreyev	Russia	2:13:33	
15	Ruggero Pertile	Italy	2:13:39	
16	José Manuel Martínez	Spain	2:14:00	
17	Francis Kirwa	Finland	2:14:22	
18	Lee Myong-Seung	South Korea	2:14:37	
19	Janne Holmén	Finland	2:14:44	
20	Abderrahim Goumri	Morocco	2:15:00	
21	Aleksey Sokolov	Russia	2:15:57	
22	Brian Sell	United States	2:16:07	
23	Ottaviano Andriani	Italy	2:16:10	
24	Dan Robinson	Great Britain	2:16:14	
25	Deng Haiyang	China	2:16:17	
26	Abderrahime Bouramdane	Morocco	2:17:42	
27	Vasyl Matviychuk	Ukraine	2:17:50	
28	Lee Bong-Ju	South Korea	2:17:56	
29	Oleg Kulkov	Russia	2:18:11	
30	Paulo Gomes	Portugal	2:18:15	
31	Alex Malinga	Uganda	2:18:26	
32	Carlos Cordero	Mexico	2:18:40	
33	Ri Kum-Song	North Korea	2:19:08	
34	Henryk Szost	Poland	2:19:43	
35	José Amado García	Guatemala	2:20:15	
36	Yonas Kifle	Eritrea	2:20:23	
37	Nasar Sakar Saeed	Bahrain	2:20:24	
38	José de Souza	Brazil	2:20:25	
39	Kamiel Maase	Netherlands	2:20:30	
40	Pak Song-Chol	North Korea	2:21:16	
41	Iaroslav Musinschi	Moldova	2:21:18	
42	Kim Il-Nam	North Korea	2:21:51	
43	Juan Carlos Cardona	Colombia	2:21:57	
44	Hendrick Ramaala	South Africa	2:22:43	
45	Arjun Kumar Basnet	Nepal	2:23:09	PB
46	Hélder Ornelas	Portugal	2:23:20	
47	Procopio Franco	Mexico	2:23:24	
48	Nelson Cruz	Cape Verde	2:23:47	
49	Roberto Echeverría	Chile	2:23:54	
50	Kim Yi-Yong	South Korea	2:23:57	
51	Li Zhuhong	China	2:24:08	
52	Bat-Ochiryn Ser-Od	Mongolia	2:24:19	
53	Norman Dlomo	South Africa	2:24:28	
54	Arkadiusz Sowa	Poland	2:24:48	
55	Samson Ramadhani	Tanzania	2:25:03	
56	Ndabili Bashingili	Botswana	2:25:11	
57	Simon Munyutu	France	2:25:50	
58	Antoni Bernadó	Andorra	2:26:29	
59	Wu Wen-Chien	Chinese Taipei	2:26:55	
60	Lee Troop	Australia	2:27:17	
61	Constantino León	Peru	2:28:04	
62	Goran Stojiljković	Montenegro	2:28:14	
63	Alfredo Arévalo	Guatemala	2:28:26	
64	Yousf Othman Qader	Qatar	2:28:40	
65	Franklin Tenorio	Ecuador	2:29:05	
66	Francisco Bautista	Mexico	2:29:28	
67	Roman Kejžar	Slovenia	2:29:37	
68	Joachim Nshimirimana	Burundi	2:29:55	
69	Seteng Ayele	Israel	2:30:07	
70	Takhir Mamashayev	Kazakhstan	2:30:26	
71	Abdil Ceylan	Turkey	2:31:43	
72	José Ríos	Spain	2:32:35	
73	Hem Bunting	Cambodia	2:33:32	
74	Marcel Tschopp	Liechtenstein	2:35:06	
75	Pavel Loskutov	Estonia	2:39:01	
76	Atsushi Sato	Japan	2:41:08	
—	Tesfayohannes Mesfen	Eritrea	DNF	After 35 km
—	Julio Rey	Spain	DNF	After 35 km
—	Martin Fagan	Ireland	DNF	After 30 km
—	Al Mustafa Riyadh	Bahrain	DNF	After 30 km
—	Ali Mabrouk El Zaidi	Libya	DNF	After 30 km
—	Marilson dos Santos	Brazil	DNF	After 30 km
—	Luke Kibet Bowen (Note: Note that some sources, such as Sports Reference and the Association of Road Racing Statisticians, suggest that the Kenyan competitor Luke Kibet was Luke Kibet Chebii (born 1973) rather than Luke Kibet Bowen (born 1983). This is incorrect, as it was the younger, reigning world champion who was called from the reserve pool to compete and was clearly visible at the race.)	Kenya	DNF	After 25 km
—	Abdulhak Elgorche Zakaria	Bahrain	DNF	After 25 km
—	Luis Fonseca	Venezuela	DNF	After 25 km
—	Oleksandr Sitkovskyy	Ukraine	DNF	After half
—	Franck de Almeida	Brazil	DNF	After half
—	Andrei Gordeev	Belarus	DNF	After half
—	João N'Tyamba	Angola	DNF	After half
—	Moses Moeketsi Mosuhli	Lesotho	DNF	After 20 km
—	Getuli Bayo	Tanzania	DNF	After 20 km
—	Mubarak Hassan Shami	Qatar	DNF	After 15 km
—	Simon Tsotang Maine	Lesotho	DNF	After 10 km
—	Clement Mabothile Lebopo	Lesotho	DNF	After 5 km
—	Olexandr Kuzin	Ukraine	DNF	After 0 km
—	Mohamed Ikoki Msandeki	Tanzania	DNS	
—	Satoshi Osaki	Japan	DNS	
—	Augusto Soares	Timor-Leste	DNS	

=== Intermediates ===
Distance	Athlete	Nation	Time
10 km	1. José Manuel Martínez	Spain	29:25
10 km	2. Deriba Merga	Ethiopia	s.t.
10 km	3. Martin Lel	Kenya	s.t.
10 km	4. Yared Asmerom	Eritrea	s.t.
10 km	5. Yonas Kifle	Eritrea	+0:01
20 km	1. Deriba Merga	Ethiopia	59:10
20 km	2. Yonas Kifle	Eritrea	s.t.
20 km	3. Martin Lel	Kenya	s.t.
20 km	4. Jaouad Gharib	Morocco	s.t.
20 km	5. Samuel Kamau Wanjiru	Kenya	s.t.
30 km	1. Deriba Merga	Ethiopia	1:29:14
30 km	2. Samuel Kamau Wanjiru	Kenya	s.t.
30 km	3. Jaouad Gharib	Morocco	+0:04
30 km	4. Martin Lel	Kenya	+0:09
30 km	5. Yonas Kifle	Eritrea	+0:15
40 km	1. Samuel Kamau Wanjiru	Kenya	1:59:54
40 km	2. Jaouad Gharib	Morocco	+0:18
40 km	3. Deriba Merga	Ethiopia	+1:57
40 km	4. Tsegay Kebede	Ethiopia	+2:43
40 km	5. Martin Lel	Kenya	+3:04

s.t. - same time.
