= 2009 World Championships in Athletics – Men's marathon =

The Men's Marathon at the 2009 World Championships in Athletics took place on August 22, 2009 in the streets of Berlin, Germany.

== Medalists ==
Gold	Abel Kirui (KEN)
Silver	Emmanuel Kipchirchir Mutai (KEN)
Bronze	(Ethiopia) Tsegay Kebede (ETH)

== Abbreviations ==
- All times shown are in hours:minutes:seconds

DNS	did not start
NM	no mark
WR	world record
WL	world leading
AR	area record
NR	national record
PB	personal best
SB	season best

== Records ==
Standing top times prior to the 2009 World Athletics Championships
World record	Haile Gebrselassie (ETH)	2:03:59	28-09-2008	Berlin, Germany
Event record	Jaouad Gharib (MAR)	2:08:31	30-08-2003	Paris, France
Season Best	Duncan Kibet (KEN)	2:04:27	05-04-2009	Rotterdam, Netherlands
Standing continental records prior to the 2009 World Athletics Championships
African record	Haile Gebrselassie (ETH)	2:03:59	28-09-2008	Berlin, Germany
Asian record	Toshinari Takaoka (JPN)	2:06:16	13-10-2002	Chicago, United States
North American record	Khalid Khannouchi (USA)	2:05:38	14-05-2002	London, United Kingdom
South American record	Ronaldo da Costa (BRA)	2:06:05	20-09-1998	Berlin, Germany
European record	António Pinto (POR)	2:06:36	16-04-2000	London, United Kingdom
Oceanian record	Robert de Castella (AUS)	2:07:51	21-04-1986	Boston, United States
Broken records at the 2009 World Athletics Championships
Event Record	Abel Kirui (KEN)	2:06:54	22-08-2009	Berlin, Germany

== Qualification standard ==
Standard
2:18:00

== Schedule ==
Date	Time	Round
August 22, 2009	11:45	Final

== Intermediates ==
Intermediate	Athlete	Country	Mark
5 km	Robert Kipkoech Cheruiyot	Kenya	15:09
10 km	Deriba Merga	Ethiopia	30:08
15 km	Deriba Merga	Ethiopia	44:57
20 km	Emmanuel Kipchirchir Mutai	Kenya	59:42
Half Marathon	Tsegay Kebede	Ethiopia	1:03:03
25 km	Robert Kipkoech Cheruiyot	Kenya	1:14:38
30 km	Abel Kirui	Kenya	1:29:43
35 km	Abel Kirui	Kenya	1:44:56
40 km	Abel Kirui	Kenya	2:00:10

== Results ==
Rank	Athlete	Nationality	Time	Notes
1st place, gold medalist(s)	Abel Kirui	Kenya	2:06:54	CR
2nd place, silver medalist(s)	Emmanuel Kipchirchir Mutai	Kenya	2:07:48	
3rd place, bronze medalist(s)	Tsegaye Kebede	Ethiopia	2:08:35	
4	Yemane Tsegay	Ethiopia	2:08:42	
5	Robert Kipkoech Cheruiyot	Kenya	2:10:46	SB
6	Atsushi Sato	Japan	2:12:05	
7	Adil Ennani	Morocco	2:12:12	
8	José Manuel Martínez	Spain	2:14:04	SB
9	José Moreira	Portugal	2:14:05	PB
10	Luís Feiteira	Portugal	2:14:06	
11	Masaya Shimizu	Japan	2:14:06	
12	Norman Dlomo	South Africa	2:14:39	SB
13	Fernando Silva	Portugal	2:14:48	
14	Satoshi Irifune	Japan	2:14:54	SB
15	Dejene Yirdaw	Ethiopia	2:15:09	
16	Marilson dos Santos	Brazil	2:15:13	SB
17	Johannes Kekana	South Africa	2:15:28	SB
18	André Pollmächer	Germany	2:15:36	
19	Adriano Bastos	Brazil	2:15:39	PB
20	Oleg Kulkov	Russia	2:15:40	
21	Martin Dent	Australia	2:16:05	
22	Coolboy Ngamole	South Africa	2:16:20	SB
23	José de Souza	Brazil	2:16:40	
24	Daniel Browne	United States	2:16:49	SB
25	Reid Coolsaet	Canada	2:16:53	PB
26	Rachid Kisri	Morocco	2:17:01	
27	Yuriy Abramov	Russia	2:17:04	
28	Phaustin Baha Sulle	Tanzania	2:17:11	
29	Ser-Od Bat-Ochir	Mongolia	2:17:22	SB
30	Andrew Letherby	Australia	2:17:29	SB
31	Daniel Kipkorir Chepyegon	Uganda	2:17:47	SB
32	Simon Munyutu	France	2:17:53	SB
33	Dylan Wykes	Canada	2:18:00	SB
34	Martin Beckmann	Germany	2:18:08	
35	George Majaji	Zimbabwe	2:18:37	SB
36	Matt Gabrielson	United States	2:18:41	SB
37	Alejandro Suárez	Mexico	2:18:55	
38	Chang Chia-Che	Chinese Taipei	2:19:32	SB
39	Kazuhiro Maeda	Japan	2:19:59	
40	Khalid Kamal Yaseen	Bahrain	2:20:11	
41	James Kibocha Theuri	France	2:20:24	
42	Roman Kejžar	Slovenia	2:20:25	SB
43	Pak Song-Chol	North Korea	2:21:12	
44	Driss El Himer	France	2:21:19	
45	Lee Myong-Seung	South Korea	2:21:54	SB
46	Mark Tucker	Australia	2:21:57	SB
47	José Amado García	Guatemala	2:22:00	SB
48	Carlos Cordero	Mexico	2:22:16	
49	Falk Cierpinski	Germany	2:22:36	
50	Hyon U Ri	North Korea	2:22:48	
51	Costantino León	Peru	2:23:34	SB
52	Andrew Smith	Canada	2:24:48	
53	Samir Baala	France	2:25:12	
54	Juan Gualberto Vargas	Mexico	2:25:26	
55	Giitah Macharia	Canada	2:25:40	SB
56	Getuli Bayo	Tanzania	2:25:52	SB
57	Scott Westcott	Australia	2:26:02	
58	Nelson Cruz	Cape Verde	2:27:16	SB
59	Andrea Silvini	Tanzania	2:28:48	
60	Arata Fujiwara	Japan	2:31:06	SB
61	Valery Pisarev	Kyrgyzstan	2:31:32	SB
62	Nate Jenkins	United States	2:32:16	SB
63	Wodage Zvadya	Israel	2:34:58	
64	Lee Myong-Ki	South Korea	2:35:12	
65	Tobias Sauter	Germany	2:35:43	
66	Pedro Nimo	Spain	2:36:39	
67	Tesfayohannes Mesfin	Eritrea	2:39:51	
68	Yook Geuntae	South Korea	2:40:47	
69	Sangay Wangchuk	Bhutan	2:47:55	NR
	Mikhail Lemaev	Russia	(2:21:47)	DQ (doping)
	Stephen Loruo Kamar	Bahrain	DNF	
	Franklin Tenorio	Ecuador	DNF	
	Yared Asmerom	Eritrea	DNF	
	Yonas Kifle	Eritrea	DNF	
	Rafael Iglesias	Spain	DNF	
	Deressa Chimsa	Ethiopia	DNF	
	Deriba Merga	Ethiopia	DNF	
	Loïc Letellier	France	DNF	
	Benjamin Kolum Kiptoo	Kenya	DNF	
	Ji Young-Jun	South Korea	DNF	
	Sechaba Bohosi	Lesotho	DNF	
	Abderrahim Goumri	Morocco	DNF	
	Reinhold Ndalikokule Iita	Namibia	DNF	
	Michael Aish	New Zealand	DNF	
	Mubarak Hassan Shami	Qatar	DNF	
	Dieudonné Disi	Rwanda	DNF	
	Lucian Disdery Hombo	Tanzania	DNF	
	Christopher Isengwe	Tanzania	DNF	
	Nicholas Kiprono	Uganda	DNF	
	Amos Masai	Uganda	DNF	
	Justin Young	United States	DNF	
	Ruggero Pertile	Italy	DNS	
	Kensuke Takahashi	Japan	DNS	
	Daniel Rono	Kenya	DNS	
	Hwang Jun-Hyeon	South Korea	DNS	
	Ali Mabrouk El Zaidi	Libya	DNS	
	Jaouad Gharib	Morocco	DNS	
	Edwardo Torres	United States	DNS	

== See also ==
- 2009 World Marathon Cup
