= Kenya at the 2007 World Championships in Athletics =

- WA code: KEN
- National federation: Athletics Kenya

in Osaka
- Medals: Gold 5 Silver 3 Bronze 5 Total 13

World Championships in Athletics appearances (overview)
- 1983; 1987; 1991; 1993; 1995; 1997; 1999; 2001; 2003; 2005; 2007; 2009; 2011; 2013; 2015; 2017; 2019; 2022; 2023; 2025

Kenya competed at the 2007 World Championships in Athletics held at Nagai Stadium in Osaka, Japan from 24 August to 2 September 2007. Kenya won five gold, three silver and five bronze medals, finishing second in the medal table, after the United States.

== Medalists ==
Medal	Name	Sport	Event
Gold	Janeth Jepkosgei	Athletics	Women's 800 m
Gold	Brimin Kipruto	Athletics	Men's 3000 m steeplechase
Gold	Alfred Yego	Athletics	Men's 800 m
Gold	Catherine Ndereba	Athletics	Women's marathon
Gold	Luke Kibet	Athletics	Men's Marathon
Silver	Ezekiel Kemboi	Athletics	Men's 3000 m steeplechase
Silver	Vivian Cheruiyot	Athletics	Women's 5000 metres
Silver	Eliud Kipchoge	Athletics	Men's 5000 metres
Bronze	Richard Mateelong	Athletics	Men's 3000 m steeplechase
Bronze	Martin Mathathi	Athletics	Men's 10000 m
Bronze	Shedrack Kibet Korir	Athletics	Men's 1500 m
Bronze	Eunice Jepkorir	Athletics	Women's 3000 m steeplechase
Bronze	Priscah Jepleting Cherono	Athletics	Women's 5000 metres

== Results ==
=== Men ===
800 metres

- Alfred Yego - 1st (1:47.09)
- Wilfred Bungei - 5th (1:47.42)
- Justus Koech - Semifinals

1500 metres

- Shedrack Kibet Korir - 3rd (3:35.04)
- Asbel Kiprop - 4th (3:35.24)
- Daniel Kipchirchir Komen - Semifinals

5000 metres

- Eliud Kipchoge - 2nd (13:46.00)
- Benjamin Limo - 15th (14:01.25)
- Isaac Songok - Heats
- Joseph Ebuya - Heats

10000 metres

- Martin Mathathi - 3rd (27:12.17)
- Josephat Ndambiri - 5th (27:31.41)
- Josphat Kiprono Menjo - 8th (28:25.67)

Marathon

- Luke Kibet - 1st (2:15:59)
- William Kiplagat - 8th (2:19:21)
- Laban Kagika - 58th (2:37:13)
- James Macharia - DNF
- Laban Kipkemboi - DNF

3000 metres steeplechase

- Brimin Kipruto - 1st (8:13.82)
- Ezekiel Kemboi - 2nd (8:16.94)
- Richard Mateelong - 3rd (8:17.5)

=== Women ===
800 metres

- Janeth Jepkosgei - 1st (1:56.04)

1500 metres

- Viola Kibiwot - 6th (4:02.10)
- Veronica Nyaruai Wanjiru - Semifinals

5000 metres

- Vivian Cheruiyot - 2nd (14:58.50)
- Priscah Jepleting Cherono - 3rd (14:59.21)
- Sylvia Kibet - 4th (14:59.26)

10000 metres

- Philes Ongori - 8th (32:30.74)
- Emily Chebet - 9th (32:31.21)
- Evelyne Wambui Nganga - 19th (33:17.12)

Marathon

- Catherine Ndereba - 1st (2:30:37)
- Rita Jeptoo - 7th (2:32:03)
- Edith Masai - 8th (2:32:22)
- Rose Cheruiyot - 24th (2:38:56)
- Hellen Jemaiyo Kimutai - 25th (2:39:14)

3000 metres steeplechase

- Eunice Jepkorir - 3rd (9:20.09)
- Ruth Bosibori - 4th (9:25.25) WJR
