= 2007 World Championships in Athletics – Men's marathon =

The men's marathon event at the 2007 World Championships in Athletics took place on August 25, 2007 in the streets of Osaka, Japan. The weather conditions were difficult, with 28 °C (82 °F) and 72% humidity at the start of the race. The temperature rose to 30 °C (86 °F) towards the end of the race, and many competitors failed to finish the race.

== Medallists ==
| Gold | Luke Kibet; Kenya (KEN) |
| Silver | Mubarak Hassan Shami; Qatar (QAT) |
| Bronze | Viktor Röthlin; Switzerland (SUI) |

== Abbreviations ==
- All times shown are in hours:minutes:seconds

| DNS | did not start |
| NM | no mark |
| WR | world record |
| WL | world leading |
| AR | area record |
| NR | national record |
| PB | personal best |
| SB | season best |

== Records ==
Standing records prior to the 2007 World Athletics Championships
| World Record | Paul Tergat (KEN) | 2:04:55 | September 28, 2003 | Berlin, Germany |
| Event Record | Jaouad Gharib (MAR) | 2:08:31 | August 30, 2003 | Paris, France |
| Season Best | Mubarak Hassan Shami (QAT) | 2:07:19 | April 15, 2007 | Paris, France |

== Final ranking ==
| Rank | Athlete | Nation | Time | Note |
|---|---|---|---|---|
| 1st place, gold medalist(s) | Luke Kibet | Kenya | 2:15:59 | |
| 2nd place, silver medalist(s) | Mubarak Hassan Shami | Qatar | 2:17:18 | |
| 3rd place, bronze medalist(s) | Viktor Röthlin | Switzerland | 2:17:25 | |
| 4 | Yared Asmerom | Eritrea | 2:17:41 | |
| 5 | Tsuyoshi Ogata | Japan | 2:17:42 | SB |
| 6 | Satoshi Osaki | Japan | 2:18:06 | SB |
| 7 | Toshinari Suwa | Japan | 2:18:35 | SB |
| 8 | William Kiplagat | Kenya | 2:19:21 | |
| 9 | Janne Holmén | Finland | 2:19:36 | |
| 10 | José Manuel Martínez | Spain | 2:20:25 | |
| 11 | Dan Robinson | Great Britain & N.I. | 2:20:30 | |
| 12 | Alex Malinga | Uganda | 2:20:36 | |
| 13 | Tomoyuki Sato | Japan | 2:20:53 | |
| 14 | Gashaw Asfaw | Ethiopia | 2:20:58 | |
| 15 | Park Ju-Young | South Korea | 2:21:49 | |
| 16 | Mike Fokoroni | Zimbabwe | 2:21:52 | |
| 17 | José Ríos | Spain | 2:22:21 | SB |
| 18 | José de Souza | Brazil | 2:22:24 | |
| 19 | Seteng Ayele | Israel | 2:22:27 | |
| 20 | Ali Mabrouk El Zaidi | Libya | 2:22:50 | |
| 21 | Mbarak Kipkorir Hussein | United States | 2:23:04 | SB |
| 22 | Alberto Chaíça | Portugal | 2:23:22 | SB |
| 23 | Mike Morgan | United States | 2:23:28 | SB |
| 24 | Kim Young-Chun | South Korea | 2:24:25 | |
| 25 | Samson Ramadhani | Tanzania | 2:25:51 | |
| 26 | Lee Myong-Seung | South Korea | 2:25:54 | |
| 27 | Hendrick Ramaala | South Africa | 2:26:00 | |
| 28 | Chang Chia-Che | Chinese Taipei | 2:26:22 | |
| 29 | Khalid Kamal Yaseen | Bahrain | 2:26:32 | SB |
| 30 | Getuli Bayo | Tanzania | 2:26:56 | |
| 31 | Dejene Berhanu | Ethiopia | 2:27:50 | SB |
| 32 | Kyle O'Brien | United States | 2:28:28 | SB |
| 33 | Su Wei | China | 2:28:41 | SB |
| 34 | Wodage Zvadya | Israel | 2:29:21 | |
| 35 | Luís Feiteira | Portugal | 2:29:34 | |
| 36 | Deng Haiyang | China | 2:29:37 | SB |
| 37 | Ulrich Steidl | Germany | 2:30:03 | |
| 38 | Ambesse Tolosa | Ethiopia | 2:30:20 | |
| 39 | Michael Tluway Mislay | Tanzania | 2:30:33 | |
| 40 | Asaf Bimro | Israel | 2:31:34 | |
| 41 | Yousf Othman Qader | Qatar | 2:32:00 | |
| 42 | Paulo Gomes | Portugal | 2:32:02 | |
| 43 | Li Zhuhong | China | 2:32:44 | |
| 44 | Rachid Kisri | Morocco | 2:32:57 | |
| 45 | Abderrahime Bouramdane | Morocco | 2:33:26 | |
| 46 | Pablo Olmedo | Mexico | 2:33:40 | |
| 47 | Marcel Tschopp | Liechtenstein | 2:33:42 | |
| 48 | Antoni Bernadó | Andorra | 2:34:28 | |
| 49 | Ren Longyun | China | 2:35:22 | |
| 50 | Fernando Cabada Jr | United States | 2:35:48 | SB |
| 51 | Peter Riley | Great Britain & N.I. | 2:36:00 | SB |
| 52 | Laban Kagika | Kenya | 2:37:13 | |
| 53 | George Mofokeng | South Africa | 2:40:22 | |
| 54 | Rito Regules | Mexico | 2:45:26 | |
| 55 | Bat-Ochiryn Ser-Od | Mongolia | 2:49:06 | SB |
| 56 | Mitsuru Kubota | Japan | 2:59:40 | |
| 57 | Tumi Malefetsane | Lesotho | 3:03:47 | |
| — | Patrick Dupouy | French Polynesia | DNF | |
| — | Geovanni Santos | Brazil | DNF | |
| — | Zongamele Dyubeni | South Africa | DNF | |
| — | Amos Masai | Uganda | DNF | |
| — | Zheng Yunshan | China | DNF | |
| — | Francis Kirwa | Finland | DNF | |
| — | Abdulhak Zakaria | Bahrain | DNF | |
| — | Abdil Ceylan | Turkey | DNF | |
| — | Joachim Nshimirimana | Burundi | DNF | |
| — | Nelson Cruz | Cape Verde | DNF | |
| — | Juan Gualberto Vargas | Mexico | DNF | |
| — | Gudisa Shentema | Ethiopia | DNF | |
| — | Khalid El Boumlili | Morocco | DNF | |
| — | Martin Beckmann (runner) | Germany | DNF | |
| — | James Mwangi Macharia | Kenya | DNF | |
| — | Migidio Bourifa | Italy | DNF | |
| — | Tesfaye Tola | Ethiopia | DNF | |
| — | Óscar Martín | Spain | DNF | |
| — | Laban Kipkemboi | Kenya | DNF | |
| — | Norman Dlomo | South Africa | DNF | |
| — | Iaroslav Musinschi | Moldova | DNF | |
| — | Bethuel Netshifhefhe | South Africa | DNF | |
| — | Hicham Chatt | Morocco | DNF | |
| — | Hélder Ornelas | Portugal | DNF | |
| — | Abderrahim Goumri | Morocco | DNF | |
| — | Takhir Mamashayev | Kazakhstan | DNF | |
| — | Julio Rey | Spain | DNF | |
| — | Pavel Loskutov | Estonia | DNF | |
| — | Luís Jesus | Portugal | DNS | |
| — | Simeon Kiplagat Sawe | United States | DNS | |

== Marathon World Cup ==
| Place | Country | Athletes | Time |
|---|---|---|---|
| 1 | Japan | Tsuyoshi Ogata; Satoshi Osaki; Toshinari Suwa (Tomoyuki Sato) (Mitsuru Kubota); Total | 2:17:42; 2:18:06; 2:18:35 (2:20:53) (2:59:40); 6:54:23 |
| 2 | South Korea | Park Ju-Young; Kim Young-Chun; Lee Myong-Seung; Total | 2:21:49; 2:24:25; 2:25:54; 7:12:08 |
| 3 | Kenya | Luke Kibet; William Kiplagat; Laban Kagika; Total | 2:15:59; 2:19:21; 2:37:13; 7:12:33 |
| 4 | United States | Mbarak Kipkorir Hussein; Mike Morgan; Kyle O'Brien (Fernando Cabada Jr); Total | 2:23:04; 2:23:28; 2:28:28 (2:35:48); 7:15:00 |
| 5 | Ethiopia | Gashaw Asfaw; Dejene Berhanu; Ambesse Tolosa; Total | 2:20:58; 2:27:50; 2:30:20; 7:19:08 |
| 6 | Tanzania | Samson Ramadhani; Getuli Bayo; Michael Tluway Mislay; Total | 2:25:51; 2:26:56; 2:30:33; 7:23:20 |
| 7 | Israel | Ayele Seteng; Zvadya Wodage; Asaf Bimro; Total | 2:22:27; 2:29:21; 2:31:34; 7:23:22 |
| 8 | Portugal | Alberto Chaíça; Luís Feiteira; Paulo Gomes; Total | 2:23:22; 2:29:34; 2:32:02; 7:24:58 |
| 9 | China | Su Wei; Deng Haiyang; Li Zhuhong (Ren Longyun); Total | 2:28:41; 2:29:37; 2:32:44 (2:35:22); 7:31:02 |

== See also ==
- 2007 World Marathon Cup
