= Su Wei =

Su Wei may refer to:

- Su Wei (politician) (蘇威; 542–623), high-level official of the Chinese Sui dynasty
- Su Wei (athlete) (born 1982), Chinese long-distance runner
- Su Wei (basketball) (苏伟; born 1989), Chinese professional basketball player
- Hsieh Su-wei (謝淑薇; born 1986), Taiwanese professional tennis player

Wei Su may refer to:

- Wei Su (historian) (危素; 1303–1372), worked on teams that produced four of the Twenty-Four Histories: the History of Song (book), History of Liao, History of Jin, and History of Yuan
- Wei Longhao (1927–1999), Republic of China actor, stage name Wei Su (魏蘇)
