= Athletics at the 2009 Summer Universiade – Men's half marathon =

The men's half marathon event at the 2009 Summer Universiade was held on 11 July.

== Results ==
Rank	Name	Nationality	Time	Notes
1st place, gold medalist(s)	Zhao Ran	China	1:04:28	
2nd place, silver medalist(s)	Tomoya Onishi	Japan	1:04:30	
3rd place, bronze medalist(s)	Francesco Bona	Italy	1:04:35	PB
4	Soji Ikeda	Japan	1:04:39	
5	Vasyl Matviychuk	Ukraine	1:05:00	
6	Abdellatif Ait Hsine	Morocco	1:05:08	
7	Reginaldo Campos	Brazil	1:05:17	
8	Abderrahim El Jaafari	Morocco	1:05:24	
9	Tamás Kovács	Hungary	1:05:35	
10	Jeong Jin-hyeok	South Korea	1:05:42	
11	Yoshihiro Wakamatsu	Japan	1:05:54	
12	Rafaele Mahapa	South Africa	1:06:23	
13	Jonathan Castaneda	Mexico	1:07:28	
14	Ho Chin Ping	Chinese Taipei	1:07:45	
15	Ismail Ssenyange	Uganda	1:08:36	
16	Chan Ka Ho	Hong Kong	1:11:01	
17	Viljar Vallimae	Estonia	1:12:28	
18	Malaba Tchendo	Togo	1:12:44	
19	Kim Min	South Korea	1:13:11	
	Velimir Bojović	Serbia	DNF	
	Nikola Stamenić	Serbia	DNF	
	Ahmed Tamri	Morocco	DNF	
