= Uganda at the 2009 World Championships in Athletics =

- WA code: UGA
- National federation: Uganda Athletics Federation

in Berlin
- Competitors: 11
- Medals: Gold 0 Silver 0 Bronze 0 Total 0

World Championships in Athletics appearances
- 1983; 1987; 1991; 1993; 1995; 1997; 1999; 2001; 2003; 2005; 2007; 2009; 2011; 2013; 2015; 2017; 2019; 2022; 2023

Uganda competed at the 2009 World Championships in Athletics from 15 to 23 August. A team of 11 athletes was announced in preparation for the competition. Selected athletes have achieved one of the competition's qualifying standards. The team of middle and long-distance running specialists features Moses Kipsiro, a 2007 World Championship bronze medallist.

== Team selection ==
Event	Athletes	
Event	Men	Women
800 metres	Abraham Chepkiwrok	
5000 metres	Moses Kipsiro; Geoffrey Kusuro	
10,000 metres	Moses Kibet; Boniface Kiprop; Martin Toroitich	
Marathon	Nicholas Kiprono; Amos Masai; Simon Rugut	Jane Suuto
3000 m steeplechase	Simon Ayeko; Benjamin Kiplagat	

== Results ==
=== Men ===
Event	Athletes	Heat		Semifinal		Final	
Event	Athletes	Result	Rank	Result	Rank	Result	Rank
800 m	Abraham Chepkiwrok	1:48,57	40	Did not advance			
5000 m	Moses Kipsiro	13:52,38	29	—		Did not advance	
5000 m	Geoffrey Kusuro	13:28.48	18	—		Did not advance	
10,000 m	Moses Kibet	—				DNS	
10,000 m	Boniface Kiprop	—				DNS	
10,000 m	Martin Toroitich	—				28:49,49	22
3000 m steeplechase	Simon Ayeko	8:37.86	26	—		Did not advance	
3000 m steeplechase	Benjamin Kiplagat	8:18.55	8 Q	—		8:17.82	11
Marathon	Nicholas Kiprono	—				DNF	
Marathon	Amos Masai	—				DNF	
Marathon	Daniel Kipkorir Chepyegon	—				2:17:47	31

=== Women ===
Event	Athletes	Heat Round 1		Heat Round 2		Semifinal		Final	
Event	Athletes	Result	Rank	Result	Rank	Result	Rank	Result	Rank
Marathon	Jane Suuto	—						2:52:44	57
