= Athletics at the 2003 Summer Universiade – Men's 10,000 metres =

The men's 10,000 metres event at the 2003 Summer Universiade was held on 26 August in Daegu, South Korea.

== Results ==
Rank	Athlete	Nationality	Time	Notes
1st place, gold medalist(s)	Jan Fitschen	Germany	29:39.47	
2nd place, silver medalist(s)	Abdellah Bay	Morocco	29:41.54	
3rd place, bronze medalist(s)	Ryuichi Hashinokuchi	Japan	29:42.07	
4	Iván Galán	Spain	29:49.01	
5	Wilson Busienei	Uganda	30:01.91	
6	Jonnatan Morales	Mexico	30:04.11	
7	Francis Yiga	Uganda	30:05.35	
8	Yoo Sung-ho	South Korea	30:20.67	
9	Lusapho April	South Africa	30:25.13	
10	Naville Mokere	South Africa	30:33.30	
11	Suliman Al-Ghodran	Jordan	30:34.62	
12	Donatien Buzingo	Burundi	30:50.39	
13	Abdelmouttalib Ouadrhiri	Morocco	31:04.56	
14	Uem Hyo-seock	South Korea	31:18.10	
15	Serapio Galindo	Peru	31:33.95	
16	Chang Chia-che	Chinese Taipei	32:14.36	
17	Biruk Gelan	Ethiopia	32:26.04	
