= Satoshi Osaki =

Japanese long-distance runner

Personal information
- Born: 4 June 1983 (age 43)
- Height: 1.77 m (5 ft 10 in)

Achievements and titles
- Personal bests: Marathon: 2:08:36; Half marathon: 1:02:24; 10,000 m: 28:34.63; 5000 m: 13:49.95; 1500 m: 3:48.90
Medal record
Men's athletics
Representing Japan
Asian U20 Championships
| Silver medal – second place | 1994 Jakarta | 5000 m |
Asian Games
| Bronze medal – third place | 2006 Doha | Marathon |
Asian Marathon Championships
| Gold medal – first place | 2002 Hong Kong | Men's race |

Satoshi Osaki (大崎悟史, Osaki Satoshi; born 4 June 1983) is a Japanese long-distance runner who specializes in the marathon.

== Career ==
Osaki was born in Sakai, Osaka where he attended Seifu High School. He was inspired by three athletes from his high school who participated in the 1992 Summer Olympics, and would later go on to give a speech at his alma mater following his 2008 Olympic selection. Osaki competed representing the Yamanashi Gakuin University before joining Team NTT Nishi Nihon in 2002.

Osaki's junior career was crowned by winning the silver medal over 5000 m at the 1994 Asian Junior Athletics Championships in Jakarta. At the 2002 Asian Marathon Championships in Hong Kong, Osaki was the top Asian finisher in 2:16:46 and the Asian champion, less than one minute behind the Kenyan winner. In the same year, he was also noted for finishing the Hofu Yomiuri Marathon in sub-2:10 hours.

In 2004, Osaki tried to qualify for the Summer Olympics in Athens. He became the best Japanese finisher at the Tokyo International Marathon, which was also the selection race for the Olympic marathon. Two years later, he finished third at the Lake Biwa Marathon and qualified for his first Asian Games. In the marathon competition, he won the bronze medal behind athletes from Qatar and Bahrain.

Osaki achieved his half marathon personal best of 1:02:24 hours in March 2007 at a race in Yamaguchi. Later that year, he qualified for his first global championship at the 2007 World Championships in Athletics, held in his hometown of Osaka. He finished sixth in the marathon, just behind compatriot Tsuyoshi Ogata. The same Qatari runner also beat him as at the Asian Games, Hassan Mubarak Shami.

Osaki achieved his marathon personal best of 2:08:36 hours at the Lake Biwa Marathon in March 2008. He qualified for the 2008 Olympic marathon, but had to ultimately withdraw from competition due to a hip injury.

Osaki retired from competition following the 2013 Lake Biwa Marathon, but he continued as a coach for Team NTT Nishi Nihon.

=== International competitions ===
| Year | Competition | Venue | Position | Event | Notes |
Representing Japan
| 2007 | World Championships | Osaka, Japan | 6th | Marathon | 2:18:06 |
