= Athletics at the 2010 Asian Games – Men's marathon =

Men's marathon at the 2010 Asian Games
- Venue: Guangzhou Triathlon Venue
- Date: 27 November 2010
- Competitors: 22 from 16 nations

Medalists
gold medal	Ji Young-jun	South Korea
silver medal	Yukihiro Kitaoka	Japan
bronze medal	Mubarak Hassan Shami	Qatar

The men's marathon event at the 2010 Asian Games was held in Guangzhou Triathlon Venue, Guangzhou on 27 November.

== Schedule ==
All times are China Standard Time (UTC+08:00)

Date	Time	Event
Saturday, 27 November 2010	12:05	Final

== Records ==
Prior to this competition, the existing world, Asian and Games records were as follows.

World Record	Haile Gebrselassie (ETH)	2:03:59	Berlin, Germany	28 September 2008
Asian Record	Toshinari Takaoka (JPN)	2:06:16	Chicago, United States	13 October 2002
Games Record	Takeyuki Nakayama (JPN)	2:08:21	Seoul, South Korea	5 October 1986

== Results ==
Legend

- DNF — Did not finish

Rank	Athlete	Time	Notes
1st place, gold medalist(s)	Ji Young-jun (KOR)	2:11:11	
2nd place, silver medalist(s)	Yukihiro Kitaoka (JPN)	2:12:46	
3rd place, bronze medalist(s)	Mubarak Hassan Shami (QAT)	2:12:53	
4	Dong Guojian (CHN)	2:14:48	
5	Khalid Kamal Yaseen (BRN)	2:15:52	
6	Pak Song-chol (PRK)	2:18:16	
7	Tomoyuki Sato (JPN)	2:18:24	
8	Ren Longyun (CHN)	2:18:43	
9	Kim Young-jin (KOR)	2:24:18	
10	Chang Chia-che (TPE)	2:26:32	
11	Ri Hyon-u (PRK)	2:27:00	
12	Yahuza (INA)	2:35:01	
13	Tseveenravdangiin Byambajav (MGL)	2:35:47	
14	Jonny Lai (HKG)	2:36:21	
15	Ram Singh Yadav (IND)	2:39:23	
16	Dunbeegiin Tserenpil (MGL)	2:44:36	
17	Eduardo Buenavista (PHI)	2:45:07	
18	Mohammad Karim Yaqoot (AFG)	2:51:33	
—	Rajendra Bahadur Bhandari (NEP)	DNF	
—	Francisco dos Santos (TLS)	DNF	
—	Gamal Belal Salem (QAT)	DNF	
—	Hem Bunting (CAM)	DNF	
