= Kekana =

Kekana is a South African surname. Notable people with the surname include:

- Grant Kekana (born 1992), South African footballer
- Hlompho Kekana (born 1985), South African footballer
- Johannes Kekana (born 1972), South African long-distance runner
- Pinky Kekana (born 1966), South African politician
- Steve Kekana (1958–2021), South African singer and songwriter
