= Toshinari =

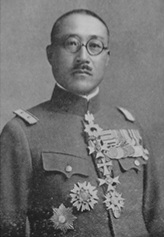
- Toshinari Maeda (1885–1942), Japanese general
- Pronunciation: toɕinaɾi (IPA)
- Gender: Male

Origin
- Origin: Japanese
- Meaning: Different meanings depending on the kanji used

Other names
- Alternative spelling: Tosinari (Kunrei-shiki) Tosinari (Nihon-shiki) Toshinari (Hepburn)

Toshinari is a masculine Japanese given name.

== Written forms ==
Toshinari can be written using different combinations of kanji characters. Some examples:

- 敏成, "agile, turn into"
- 敏也, "agile, to be"
- 敏為, "agile, do"
- 敏形, "agile, shape"
- 俊成, "talented, turn into"
- 俊也, "talented, to be"
- 俊為, "talented, do"
- 俊形, "talented, shape"
- 利成, "benefit, turn into"
- 利也, "benefit, to be"
- 利為, "benefit, do"
- 利形, "benefit, shape"
- 年成, "year, turn into"
- 年也, "year, to be"
- 寿成, "long life, turn into"
- 寿也, "long life, to be"

The name can also be written in hiragana としなり or katakana トシナリ.

== Notable people with the name ==
- Toshinari Fukamachi (深町 寿成), Japanese voice actor.
- Toshinari Maeda (前田 利為, 1885–1942), Japanese general.
- Toshinari Fujiwara (藤原 俊成, 1114–1204), better known as Fujiwara no Shunzei, poet and nobleman of ancient Japan.
- Toshinari Suwa (諏訪 利成, born 1977), member of the men's marathon team for Japan in the 2004 Summer Olympics.
- Toshinari Takaoka (高岡 寿成, born 1970), Japanese long-distance runner.

== Fictional characters ==
Toshinari Seki (関 俊成), from manga and anime Tonari no Seki-kun (a.k.a. My Neighbor Seki).
