= 2008 European 10,000m Cup =

- Organisers: EAA
- Edition: 12th
- Date: 12 April
- Host city: (Turkey) Istanbul
- Events: 2

The 2008 European 10,000m Cup, was the 12th edition of the European 10,000m Cup took place on 12 April in Istanbul, Turkey.

== Individual ==
=== Men ===
Rank	Athlete	Country	Time	Notes
1st place, gold medalist(s)	Selim Bayrak	Turkey	27.47,75	(NR)
2nd place, silver medalist(s)	Carles Castillejo	Spain	28.07,55	
3rd place, bronze medalist(s)	Oleg Kulkov	Russia	28.48,55	(SB)
4	Sergey Yemelyanov	Russia	28.49,55	
5	Juan Carlos de la Ossa	Spain	28.55,58	
6	Daniele Meucci	Italy	28.56,53	
7	Aleksey Reunkov	Russia	29.09,22	
8	Stsiapan Rahautsou	Belarus	29.14,22	(PB)
9	Paulo Gomes	Portugal	29.15,22	(PB)
10	Licínio Pimentel	Portugal	29.22,18	

=== Women ===
Rank	Athlete	Country	Time	Notes
1st place, gold medalist(s)	Elvan Abeylegesse	Turkey	31.36,33	
2nd place, silver medalist(s)	Lornah Kiplagat	Netherlands	31.53,72	
3rd place, bronze medalist(s)	Hilda Kibet	Netherlands	32.05,49	
4	Anikó Kálovics	Hungary	32.09,02	(SB)
5	Alina Gherasim	Romania	32.29,52	(SB)
6	Nataliya Berkut	Ukraine	32.36,90	
7	Volha Krautsova	Belarus	32.43,28	(SB)
8	Volha Minina	Belarus	32.58,36	(PB)
9	Helena Javornik	Slovenia	33.07,49	(SB)
10	Nathalie De Vos	Belgium	33.10,76	

== Team ==
In italic the participants whose result did not go into the team's total time, but awarded with medals.

Men
Rank	Nation	Time
1st place, gold medalist(s)	Russia	1:26.47,32
2nd place, silver medalist(s)	Spain	1:27.31,71
3rd place, bronze medalist(s)	Italy; Daniele Meucci; Gianmarco Buttazzo; Fabio Mascheroni; Francesco Bona	1:28.36,56

Women
Rank	Nation	Time
1st place, gold medalist(s)	Belarus	1:40.31,27
2nd place, silver medalist(s)	Turkey	1:42.27,62
