= Athletics at the 2009 Summer Universiade – Men's 10,000 metres =

The men's 10,000 metres event at the 2009 Summer Universiade was held on 8 July.

== Results ==
Rank	Name	Nationality	Time	Notes
1st place, gold medalist(s)	Sibabalwe Mzazi	South Africa	28:21.44	SB
2nd place, silver medalist(s)	Denis Mayaud	France	28:21.50	
3rd place, bronze medalist(s)	Lungisa Mdedelwa	South Africa	28:21.52	SB
4	Aleksey Reunkov	Russia	28:21.68	PB
5	Stsiapan Rahautsou	Belarus	28:25.74	
6	Tsuyoshi Ugachi	Japan	28:37.87	
7	Joseph Chebet	Uganda	28:37.87	
8	Ryuji Kashiwabara	Japan	28:38.48	
9	Abderrahim El Jaafari	Morocco	29:25.17	
10	Ren Longyun	China	29:37.37	
11	Tibor Végh	Hungary	29:47.71	
12	Lhoussein Boumezgour	Morocco	29:50.20	PB
13	Abdellatif Ait Hsine	Bahrain	29:58.61	PB
14	Reginaldo Campos	Brazil	30:00.69	
15	Liu Chao	China	30:11.32	
16	Shin Yun-ho	South Korea	30:16.13	
17	Darko Živanović	Serbia	30:17.42	
18	Ho Chin-Ping	Chinese Taipei	30:27.47	
19	Ismail Ssenyange	Uganda	31:02.20	
20	Mainza Makunga	Zambia	33:44.39	
