= Hoseah Tjale =

South African ultra-marathon runner (born 1954)

Personal information
- Nationality: South African
- Born: Hoseah Tjale; 6 June 1954
- Occupation: Delivery Truck Driver

Sport
- Sport: Ultra-Marathon Running
- Club: Johannesburg Harriers

Achievements and titles
- Personal bests: Marathon:1982 2H18M Port Elizabeth; Two Oceans Ultra Marathon: 1980 3H14M; Comrades Ultra Marathon: Down run 1986 5H29M; Comrades Ultra Marathon: Up run 1985 5H42M; London To Brighton 5H29M

Hoseah (Hoss) Tsjale (born 6 June 1954) is a South African ultra-marathon runner.

== Early life ==
He was brought up in Johannesburg, South Africa. As a black South African he was only allowed to participate in road running in 1975 when races were open for all races.

== Running career ==
He won the Two Oceans Marathon, an ultra-Marathon (56 km), in 1980. He came second in the Comrades Marathon, an ultra-Marathon (90 km), in 1985 and 1990 and came 3rd in 1986 and 1987. He participated in the London to Brighton ultra-marathon (56 Miles), which he won in 1985.

== Amateur ==
As an amateur he never received any money for his winnings.

== Recognition ==
Sello Mokoena and Bruce Fordyce describe him as a best competitor to participate in the Comrades Marathon.
