= Mike Fokoroni =

Zimbabwean long-distance runner

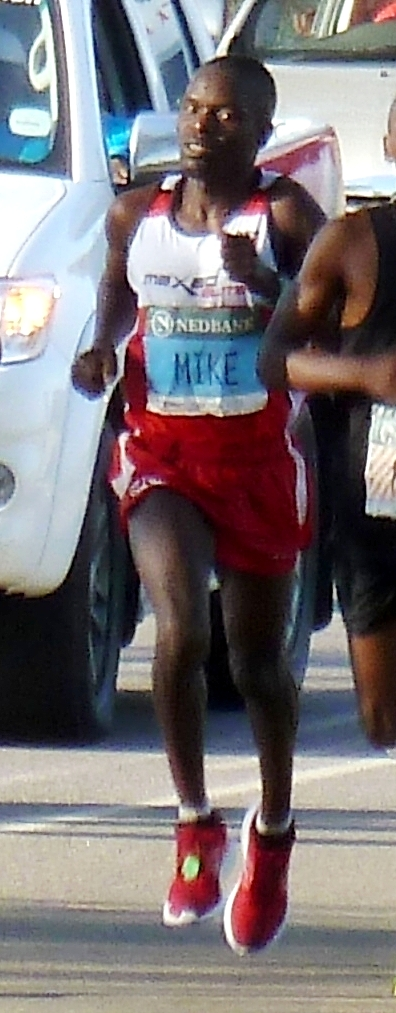
Mike Fokoroni during the Comrades ultramarathon

Mike Fokoroni (also written Mike Fokorani; born 10 January 1977) is a Zimbabwean long-distance runner. His personal best time for the marathon is 2:13:17 hours, achieved in August 2008, placing 11th at the Beijing Olympics. In June 2013 he finished 8th to receive a gold medal in the Comrades ultramarathon of 87 km.

Fokoroni won the 2016 Two Oceans Marathon and the 2022 Great Zimbabwe Marathon.

== Achievements ==
Year	Competition	Venue	Position	Event	Notes
Representing Zimbabwe
2007	World Championships	Osaka, Japan	16th	Marathon	2:21:52
