= Arkadiusz Sowa =

Polish marathon runner (born 1979)

Personal information
- Full name: Arkadiusz Rafał Sowa
- Nationality: Poland
- Born: 2 March 1979 (age 47) Sosnowiec, Poland
- Height: 1.72 m (5 ft 7 1/2 in)
- Weight: 58 kg (128 lb)

Sport
- Sport: Athletics
- Event: Marathon
- Club: Grunwald Poznań

Achievements and titles
- Personal bests: Half-marathon: 1:03:13 (2008); Marathon: 2:12:00 (2007)

Arkadiusz Rafał Sowa (born March 2, 1979) is a Polish marathon runner. He set a personal best time of 2:12:00, by finishing seventh at the 2007 Berlin Marathon.

Sowa represented Poland at the 2008 Summer Olympics in Beijing, where he competed for the men's marathon, along with his compatriot Henryk Szost. He successfully finished the race in fifty-fourth place by fifteen seconds ahead of Tanzania's Samson Ramadhani, with a time of 2:24:48.
