= Ren Longyun =

Chinese long-distance runner

Ren Longyun (Chinese: 任龙云; born 12 October 1987 in Minhe, Qinghai) is a Chinese long-distance runner who specializes in the marathon.

He finished ninth (in the 10,000 metres) at the 2006 World Junior Championships and competed at the 2007 World Championships. He also finished second in the 2007 Beijing Marathon. Additionally, he represented his country at the 2008 Summer Olympics.

== Achievements ==
Year	Competition	Venue	Position	Event	Notes
Representing China
2006	World Junior Championships	Beijing, China	8th	10,000 m	29:19.25
2007	World Championships	Osaka, Japan	49th	Marathon	2:35:22
2009	Universiade	Belgrade, Serbia	18th (h)	5000 m	14:17.97
2009	Universiade	Belgrade, Serbia	10th	10,000 m	29:37.37
2010	Asian Games	Guangzhou, China	8th	Marathon	2:18:43
2013	Universiade	Kazan, Russia	24th	Half marathon	1:08:43

== Personal bests ==
- 5000 metres - 14:12.06 min (2004)
- 10,000 metres - 28:08.67 min (2007)
- Marathon - 2:08:15 hrs (2007)
