= Caroline Wöstmann =

South African ultramarathon runner

Personal information
- Nationality: South Africa
- Born: 18 January 1983 (age 43) Johannesburg, South Africa
- Occupation: Chartered accountant

Achievements and titles
- Personal best(s): Half marathon: 1:19:13; Marathon: 2:44:26

Caroline Wöstmann (born 18 January 1983 in Johannesburg) is a South African marathon and ultra-marathon athlete. She is well known for making history by winning both the Two Oceans and 90th Comrades marathon in the same year.

Wöstmann began her running career (2009) after the birth of her first child. She required a workout that could fit into her family life and busy professional career.

Professionals took note of her when she positioned 15th place in only her third Comrades with a silver medal at the 2012 Comrades Marathon. Thereafter, she joined the Nedbank Running Club and trained at the University of Pretorias’ High Performance Centre. Lindsey Parry coached her and Candice Attree helped her to stay focused on core- and strength training.

During 2014 Wöstmann placed 6th in her fourth attempt at the Comrades. After winning the Two Oceans Marathon earlier in 2015, she became the first South African woman, in 14 years, to win the prestigious Comrades Marathon. Wöstmann is only the second South African woman, after Frith van der Merwe (1989) to win both the Two Oceans Marathon and Comrades Marathon in the same year.

After consistent improvement of her personal best times she was named the Athletics Gauteng North's Female Athlete of 2014.

Caroline Wöstmann won the 2015 Two Oceans Marathon on only her second attempt.

== Races ==
Notable past running performances:

Year	Race	Time	Distance	Position
2017	Old Mutual Om die Dam	03:38:38	50 km	1
2016	Comrades Marathon	06:30:44	89.13 km	2
2016	Two Oceans Marathon	03:44:44	56 km	1
2015	Comrades Marathon	06:12:22	87.72 km	1
2015	Two Oceans Marathon	03:41:24	56 km	1
2015	McCarthy Volkswagen/Audi Love Run	01:20:50	21.1 km	1
2015	Sarens Edenvale	03:03:12	42.2 km	1
2014	Aspen Port Elizabeth City	02:44:57	42.2 km	1
2014	Comrades Marathon	06:51:43	89.28 km	6
2014	Old Mutual Om die Dam	03:48:51	50 km	3
2013	Old Mutual Om die Dam	03:41:44	50 km	4
2012	Comrades Marathon	07:16:48	89.28 km	15
2011	Comrades Marathon	08:33:29	89.96 km	68
2009	Comrades Marathon	09:17:39	89.3 km	205
