= Fusi Nhlapo =

South African ultramarathon athlete

Personal information
- Nationality: South African
- Born: Fusi Nhlapo; 1971 (age 54–55) Orange Farm, Free State, South Africa
- Occupation: Long-distance runner

Sport
- Country: South Africa
- Sport: Athletics
- Event(s): Marathon, Ultramarathon
- Club: Mr. Price

Achievements and titles
- Personal best: Marathon: 2:18:24 (South African Championships 2000)

Fusi Nhlapo (born 1971) is a South African ultramarathon runner who won the 2003 Comrades Marathon in 5 hours, 28 minutes, and 52 seconds and the 1998 Two Oceans Marathon. In addition to winning Comrades, Nhlapo has also earned a gold medal for each of his 10 finishes in the top 10 at Comrades. Nhlapo set his personal best in the marathon in the 2000 South African Championships in Pinelands, Cape Town, South Africa.
