= Two Oceans Marathon =

Annual marathon in Cape Town, South Africa

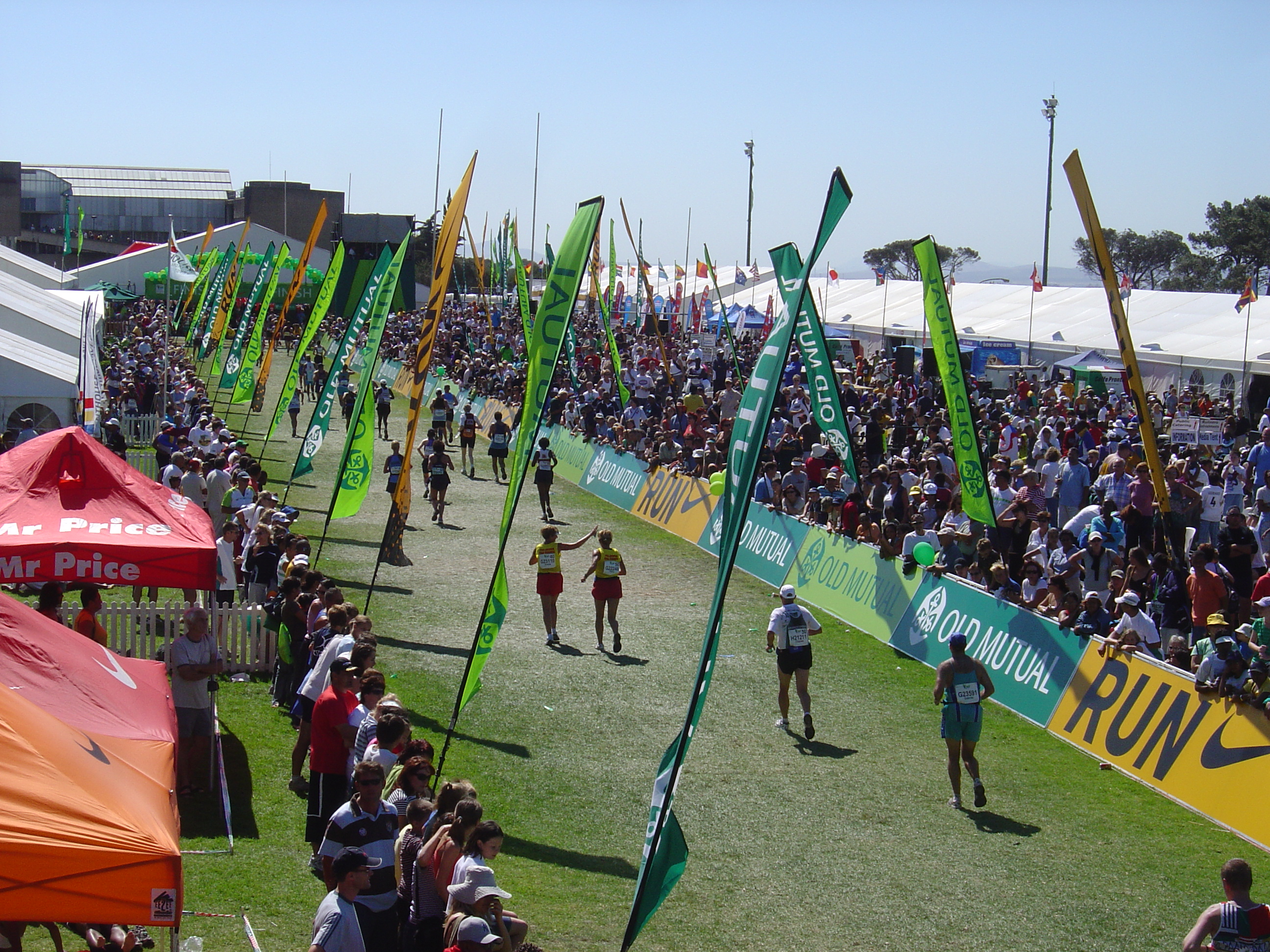
- Finish of the Two Oceans Marathon at the University of Cape Town
- Date: April
- Location: Cape Town, South Africa
- Event type: Road
- Distance: Ultramarathon (56 km)
- Course records: Men: 3:03:44 (1988) Thompson Magawana; Women: 3:26:54 (2024) Gerda Steyn
- Website: www.twooceansmarathon.org.za

The Two Oceans Marathon is a 56 kilometres (35 mi) ultramarathon and 21 kilometres (13 mi) half-marathon held annually in Cape Town, South Africa with the ultramarathon held on a Saturday in April and the half marathon held the next day on the Sunday. It was previously held on Easter weekend.

Described as "the world's most beautiful marathon", the race is run against a backdrop of spectacular scenery through the Cape Peninsula.

Both races start in Newlands. The Ultra Marathon follows a more or less circular route through Muizenberg, Fish Hoek, over Chapman's Peak, through Hout Bay and Constantia Nek, and eventually finishes at the University of Cape Town campus. On occasions when Chapman's Peak Drive has been closed due to construction or rock falls, the Ultra Marathon has followed an alternative route over Ou Kaapse Weg.

The Half Marathon takes runners along Edinburgh Drive (the M3 highway), before turning into forest roads past Kirstenbosch and finishing at the University of Cape Town campus.

Since its inaugural edition in 1970, the event has grown. Selling out every year, the Half Marathon sees some 16,000 participants (making it the biggest half marathon in South Africa), while 11,000 athletes tackle the 56 km Ultra Marathon.

In addition to the main events, other events take place:

- Approximately 6 000 runners - including toddlers and young children with their families - take part in various fun runs
- Approximately 1 000 trail runners traverse the trails of the Table Mountain National Park
- International participants get to run a scenic 5 km route along the Sea Point promenade as part of the International Friendship Run

The 2020 and 2021 editions of the race were cancelled due to the COVID-19 pandemic.

== Winners ==
=== Men ===
Key: Current course record

Year	Winner	Time	Country
2026	Arthur Jantjies	3:09:25	South Africa
2025	Khoarahlane Seutloali	3:10:46	Lesotho
2024	Onalenna Khonkhobe	3:09:30	South Africa
2023	Givemore Mudzinganyama	3:09:42	Zimbabwe
2022	Edndale Belachew	3:09:05	Ethiopia
—	cancelled in 2020 and 2021 due to COVID-19 pandemic		
2019	Bongmusa Mthembu	3:08:40	South Africa
2018	Justin Kemboi	3:09:21	Kenya
2017	Lungile Gongqa	3:09:43	South Africa
2016	Mike Fokoroni	3:13:33	Zimbabwe
2015	Motlokoa Nkhabutlane	3:10:27	Lesotho
2014	Lebenya Nkoko	3:09:52	Lesotho
2013	David Gatebe	3:08:54	South Africa
2012	Stephen Muzhingi	3:08:08	Zimbabwe
2011	George Ntshiliza	3:08:31	South Africa
2010	Mabuthile Lebopo	3:06:18	Lesotho
2009	John Wachira	3:10:06	Kenya
2008	Marco Mambo	3:11:35	Zimbabwe
2007	Bethuel Netshifhefhe	3:08:03	South Africa
2006	Moses Njodzi	3:06:50	Zimbabwe
2005	Marco Mambo	3:05:39	Zimbabwe
2004	Marco Mambo	3:07:41	Zimbabwe
2003	Mluleki Nobanda	3:09:21	South Africa
2002	Hlonepha Simon Mphulanyane	3:09:42	South Africa
2001	Honest Mutsakani	3:11:18	Zimbabwe
2000	Joshua Peterson	3:13:13	South Africa
1999	Isaac Tshabalala	3:11:20	South Africa
1998	Fusi Nhlapo	3:11:30	South Africa
1997	Zithulele Sinqe	3:07:17	South Africa
1996	Zithulele Sinqe	3:09:45	South Africa
1995	Simon Malindi	3:10:53	South Africa
1994	Phineas Makaba	3:15:06	South Africa
1993	Isaac Tshabalala	3:14:29	South Africa
1992	Israel Morake	3:15:56	South Africa
1991	Miltas Tshabalala	3:16:00	South Africa
1990	Willie Mtolo	3:10:51	South Africa
1989	Johannes Thobejane	3:12:20	South Africa
1988	Thompson Magawana	3:03:44	South Africa
1987	Thompson Magawana	3:05:31	South Africa
1986	Ephraim Sibisi	3:09:30	South Africa
1985	Siphiwe Gqele	3:11:57	South Africa
1984	Siphiwe Gqele	3:10:57	South Africa
1983	Siphiwe Gqele	3:11:54	South Africa
1982	Ben Cheou	3:11:15	South Africa
1981	Johnny Halberstadt	3:05:37	South Africa
1980	Hoseah Tjale	3:14:30	South Africa
1979	Vincent Rakabaele	3:08:56	Lesotho
1978	Brian Chamberlain	3:15:23	South Africa
1977	Brian Chamberlain	3:15:22	South Africa
1976	Vincent Rakabaele	3:18:05	Lesotho
1975	Derek Preiss	3:22:01	South Africa
1974	Derek Preiss	3:21:40	South Africa
1973	Don Hartley	3:24:05	South Africa
1972	Don Hartley	3:25:12	South Africa
1971	Rob Knutzen	3:42:31	South Africa
1970	Dirkie Steyn	3:55:50	South Africa

=== Women ===
Key: Current course record

Year	Winner	Time	Country
2026	Gerda Steyn	3:27:43	South Africa
2025	Gerda Steyn	3:29:09	South Africa
2024	Gerda Steyn	3:26:54	South Africa
2023	Gerda Steyn	3:29:06	South Africa
2022	Gerda Steyn	3:29:42	South Africa
—	cancelled in 2020 and 2021 due to COVID-19 pandemic		
2019	Gerda Steyn	3:31:29	South Africa
2018	Gerda Steyn	3:39:31	South Africa
2017	Maryna Damantsevich	3:37:13	Belarus
2016	Caroline Wöstmann	3:44:44	South Africa
2015	Caroline Wöstmann	3:41:23	South Africa
2014	Nina Podnebesnova	3:40:07	Russia
2013	Tabitha Tsatsa	3:39:54	Zimbabwe
2012	Elena Nurgalieva	3:41:55	Russia
2011	Olesya Nurgalieva	3:33:58	Russia
2010	Olesya Nurgalieva	3:41:52	Russia
2009	Elena Nurgalieva	3:40:43	Russia
2008	Olesya Nurgalieva	3:34:53	Russia
2007	Madina Biktagirova	3:35:11	Russia
2006	Tatyana Zhirkova	3:36:19	Russia
2005	Elena Nurgalieva	3:38:12	Russia
2004	Elena Nurgalieva	3:37:51	Russia
2003	Simona Staicu	3:37:32	Hungary
2002	Natalia Volgina	3:38:02	Russia
2001	Natalia Volgina	3:44:53	Russia
2000	Sarah Mahlangu	3:48:58	South Africa
1999	Angelina Sephooa	3:38:09	Lesotho
1998	Angelina Sephooa	3:49:59	Lesotho
1997	Angelina Sephooa	3:45:45	Lesotho
1996	Maria Bak	3:45:16	Germany
1995	Fehér Enikő	3:49:31	Hungary
1994	Carolyn Hunter-Rowe	3:51:37	United Kingdom
1993	Pat Lithgow	3:57:11	South Africa
1992	Monica Drogemoller	3:49:16	South Africa
1991	Monica Drogemoller	3:50:23	South Africa
1990	Monica Drogemoller	3:42:39	South Africa
1989	Frith van der Merwe	3:30:36	South Africa
1988	Monica Drogemoller	3:44:29	South Africa
1987	Liz Eglinton	3:53:52	South Africa
1986	Adelene Joubert	3:52:59	South Africa
1985	Beverly Malan	3:55:51	South Africa
1984	Helen Lucre	3:52:20	South Africa
1983	Beverly Malan	3:57:32	South Africa
1982	Beverly Malan	3:59:08	South Africa
1981	Gail Hurry	4:11:31	South Africa
1980	Gail Hurry	4.14:05	South Africa
1979	Diane Alperstein	4:22:58	South Africa
1978	Janet Bailey	4:34:28	South Africa
1977	Marie-Jeanne Duyvejonk	5:03:52	Belgium
1976	Marie-Jeanne Duyvejonk	5:01:07	Belgium
1975	Ulla Paul	5:14:51	South Africa

=== Half Marathon ===
Key: Course record

Year	Men's winner	Time (h:m:s)	Women's winner	Time (h:m:s)
2026	Felix Kibet Masai (KEN)	01:03:17	Lavinia Haitope (NAM)	01:14:36
2025	William Kaptein (RSA)	01:04:41	Mercy Jebet Kibor (KEN)	01:17:06
2024	Thabang Mosiako (RSA)	01:04:40	Mokulubete Makatisi (LES)	01:13:52
2023	Mbuleli Mthanga (RSA)	01:03:58	Emma Pallant (GBR)	01:14:17
2022	Moses Tarakinyu (ZIM)	01:03:31	Fortunate Chidzivo (ZIM)	01:14:49
—	cancelled in 2020 and 2021 due to COVID-19 pandemic			
2019	Elroy Gelant (RSA)	1:03:17	Helalia Johannes (NAM)	1:10:26
2018	David Manja (RSA)	1:04:08	Nolene Conrad (RSA)	1:16:18
2017	Namakoe Nkhasi (LES)	1:03:15	Irvette van Zyl (RSA)	1:13:53
2016	Namakoe Nkhasi (LES)	1:03:38	Irvette van Zyl (RSA)	1:13:14
2015	Stephen Mokoka (RSA)	1:04:00	Lebogang Phalula (RSA)	1:14:48
2014	Stephen Mokoka (RSA)	1:04:16	Dina Lebo Phalula (RSA)	1:14:00
2013	Stephen Mokoka (RSA)	1:03:36	Meseret Mengistu (ETH)	1:12:43
2012	Xolisa Tyali (RSA)	1:04:52	René Kalmer (RSA)	1:15:02
2011	Lusapho April (RSA)	1:03:59	Helalia Johannes (NAM)	1:11:57
2010	Lusapho April (RSA)	1:03:54	René Kalmer (RSA)	1:12:39
2009	Stephen Mokoka (RSA)	1:03:42	Helalia Johannes (NAM)	1:13:34
2008	George Majaji (ZIM)	1:03:31	Mamorallo Tjoka (LES)	1:15:04
2007	Willy Kariuku Mwangi (KEN)	1:03:05	Helalia Johannes (NAM)	1:13:16
2006	Cuthbert Nyasango (ZIM)	1:02:54	Helalia Johannes (NAM)	1:13:35
2005	Hendrick Ramaala (RSA)	1:03:26	Mamorallo Tjoka (LES)	1:15:58
2004	Elijah Mutandiro (RSA)	1:04:02	Ronel Thomas (RSA)	1:16:46
2003	Luwis Masunda (ZIM)	1:03:46	Charné Rademeyer (RSA)	1:15:48
2002	Josia Thugwane (RSA)	1:04:15	Charné Rademeyer (RSA)	1:15:27
2001	Zacharia Mpolokeng (RSA)	1:05:53	Charné Rademeyer (RSA)	1:17:37
2000	Elijah Mutandiro (ZIM)	1:05:31	Kirsty Weir (RSA)	1:18:24
1999	Elijah Mutandiro (ZIM)	1:04:35	Theresa du Toit (RSA)	1:19:53
1998	Makhosonke Fika (RSA)	1:05:35	Gwen Griffiths-van Lingen (RSA)	1:17:01
