= Park Ju-young =

South Korean long-distance runner

Park Ju-Young (born 5 July 1980) is a South Korean long-distance runner.

He finished fifth in the half marathon at the 2003 Summer Universiade, and fifteenth in the marathon at the 2007 World Championships.

His personal best time is 2:14:07 hours, achieved in November 2003 in Seoul.

== Achievements ==
Year	Competition	Venue	Position	Event	Notes
Representing South Korea
2003	Universiade	Daegu, South Korea	5th	Half marathon	1:05:33
2007	World Championships	Osaka, Japan	15th	Marathon	2:21:49
