= Yousuf Othman Qader =

Qatari marathon runner

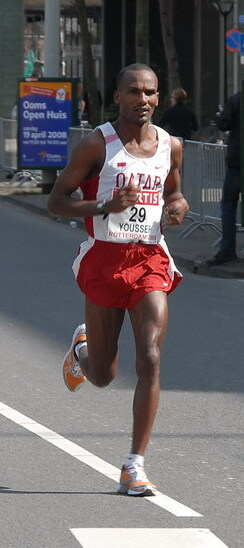
- Qader at the 2008 Rotterdam Marathon

Personal information
- Nationality: Qatar
- Born: 5 April 1985 (age 41)
- Height: 1.70 m (5 ft 7 in)
- Weight: 58 kg (128 lb)

Sport
- Sport: Athletics
- Event: Marathon

Achievements and titles
- Personal best(s): Half-marathon: 1:02:21; Marathon: 2:13:18

Yousuf Othman Qader (Arabic: يوسف عثمان قادر; born April 5, 1985) is a Qatari marathon runner. Qader represented Qatar at the 2008 Summer Olympics in Beijing, where he competed for the men's marathon, along with his compatriot Mubarak Shami. He finished the race in sixty-fourth place by fourteen seconds behind Guatemala's Alfredo Arévalo, with a time of 2:28:40.

Qader also achieved his personal best time of 2:13:18 at the 2007 Hamburg Marathon.
