= Kim Il-nam =

North Korean marathoner (born 1980)

Kim Il-Nam
- Born: 15 March 1980 (age 45)
- Occupation: Long-distance runner
- Known for: Competing in the 2008 Summer Olympics

Korean name
- Hangul: 김일남
- RR: Gim Ilnam
- MR: Kim Illam

Kim Il-nam (Korean: 김일남; born 15 March 1980) is a North Korean long-distance runner who specializes in the marathon.

He competed in the 2008 Olympic marathon.

His personal best time is 2:14:38 hours, achieved at the 2008 Pyongyang Marathon.
