= 2007 World Championships in Athletics – Women's marathon =

The women's marathon event at the 2007 World Championships in Athletics took place on 2 September 2007 in the streets of Osaka, Japan.

== Medallists ==
Gold	Catherine Ndereba; Kenya (KEN)
Silver	Zhou Chunxiu; China (CHN)
Bronze	Reiko Tosa; Japan (JPN)

== Abbreviations ==
- All times shown are in hours:minutes:seconds

DNS	did not start
NM	no mark
WR	world record
AR	area record
NR	national record
PB	personal best
SB	season best

== Records ==
World record	2:15:25	Paula Radcliffe	Great Britain	London, Great Britain	13 April 2003
Championship Record	2:20:57	Paula Radcliffe	Great Britain	Helsinki, Finland	2005

== Results ==
Place	Athlete	Nation	Time	Notes
1st place, gold medalist(s)	Catherine Ndereba	Kenya	2:30:37	SB
2nd place, silver medalist(s)	Zhou Chunxiu	China	2:30:45	
3rd place, bronze medalist(s)	Reiko Tosa	Japan	2:30:55	SB
4	Zhu Xiaolin	China	2:31:21	
5	Lidia Șimon	Romania	2:31:26	SB
6	Kiyoko Shimahara	Japan	2:31:40	SB
7	Rita Jeptoo	Kenya	2:32:03	SB
8	Edith Masai	Kenya	2:32:22	
9	Mara Yamauchi	Great Britain & N.I.	2:32:55	
10	Lyubov Morgunova	Russia	2:33:41	
11	Zhang Shujing	China	2:33:46	
12	Gulnara Vygovskaya	Russia	2:33:57	
13	Nina Rillstone	New Zealand	2:33:58	SB
14	Mari Ozaki	Japan	2:35:04	
15	Madaí Pérez	Mexico	2:35:17	
16	Souad Aït Salem	Algeria	2:35:29	
17	Anna Incerti	Italy	2:36:36	SB
18	Yumiko Hara	Japan	2:36:40	
19	Tracey Morris	Great Britain & N.I.	2:36:40	SB
20	Melanie Kraus	Germany	2:37:20	
21	Sun Weiwei	China	2:37:53	
22	Askale Tafa	Ethiopia	2:38:01	
23	Yasuko Hashimoto	Japan	2:38:36	
24	Rose Cheruiyot	Kenya	2:38:56	
25	Hellen Jemaiyo Kimutai	Kenya	2:39:14	
26	Deborah Toniolo	Italy	2:39:46	SB
27	Anna Rahm	Sweden	2:41:15	
28	Alina Gherasim	Romania	2:41:40	
29	Kirsten Melkevik Otterbu	Norway	2:41:57	
30	Helena Javornik	Slovenia	2:42:03	
31	Ann Alyanak	United States	2:42:23	
32	Nailiya Yulamanova	Russia	2:42:56	
33	Živilė Balčiūnaitė	Lithuania	2:43:28	
34	Tabitha Tsatsa	Zimbabwe	2:44:20	
35	Zoila Gómez	United States	2:44:49	
36	Anália Rosa	Portugal	2:45:38	SB
37	Wei Yanan	China	2:45:50	
38	Dana Coons	United States	2:46:12	SB
39	Annemette Aagaard	Denmark	2:46:22	
40	Bahar Doğan	Turkey	2:46:25	
41	Nili Abramski	Israel	2:46:27	
42	Mary Akor	United States	2:47:06	
43	Susanne Hahn	Germany	2:47:29	
44	Lim Kyung-Hee	South Korea	2:49:30	SB
45	Chae Eun-Hee	South Korea	2:50:26	
46	Eleni Donta	Greece	2:50:59	
47	Zekiros Adanech	Ethiopia	2:54:00	
48	Lucilla Andreucci	Italy	2:56:19	
49	Samia Akbar	United States	2:56:27	SB
50	Georgia Abatzidou	Greece	2:59:22	SB
51	Patricia Gauquelin	French Polynesia	3:03:08	SB
52	Luvsanlkhündegiin Otgonbayar	Mongolia	3:04:59	SB
53	Kerstin Mennenga-Metzler	Liechtenstein	3:11:45	
54	Tanith Maxwell	South Africa	3:14:56	
55	Poppy Mlambo	South Africa	3:23:55	
56	Robe Tola	Ethiopia	3:26:45	
57	Melissa Henderson	Belize	3:52:35	
	Luciah Kimani	Bosnia and Herzegovina	DNF	
	Domingas Embana Togna	Guinea-Bissau	DNF	
	Lioudmila Kortchaguina	Russia	DNF	
	Angélica Sánchez	Mexico	DNF	
	Dire Tune	Ethiopia	DNF	
	Luminița Talpoș	Romania	DNF	
	Galina Bogomolova	Russia	DNF	
	Nuţa Olaru	Romania	DNF	
	Giovanna Volpato	Italy	DNF	
	Shitaye Gemechu	Ethiopia	DNS	

== Team ==
Place	Country	Mark
1	Kenya	7:35:02
2	China	7:35:52
3	Japan	7:37:39
4	Russia	7:50:34
5	Italy	8:12:41
6	United States	8:13:24
7	Ethiopia	8:58:46

== See also ==
- 2007 World Marathon Cup
