= Andrei Hardzeyeu =

Belarusian marathon runner

Personal information
- Full name: Andrej Aliaksandravič Hardziejeǔ
- Nationality: Belarus
- Born: 7 August 1973 (age 52) Mogilev, Byelorussian SSR, Soviet Union (now Belarus)
- Height: 1.82 m (5 ft 11 1/2 in)
- Weight: 68 kg (150 lb)

Sport
- Sport: Athletics
- Event: Marathon

Achievements and titles
- Personal best(s): Half-marathon: 1:03:46 (2001); Marathon: 2:11:44 (2001)

Andrej Aliaksandravič Hardziejeǔ (Belarusian: Андрэй Аляксандравіч Гардзееў, commonly transliterated as Andrei Hardzeyeu; born 7 August 1973) is a Belarusian marathon runner. He achieved his personal best time of 2:11:44 by winning the gold medal at the 2001 Hannover Marathon.

At age thirty-five, Hardzeyeu made his official debut for the 2008 Summer Olympics in Beijing, where he competed in the men's marathon. He did not finish the entire race, before reaching the 25 km lap of the course.
