= Tomoyuki Sato =

Japanese long-distance runner

Tomoyuki Sato (佐藤 智之, Satō Tomoyuki; born 31 January 1981) is a Japanese long-distance runner.

He finished thirteenth in the marathon at the 2007 World Championships.

== International competitions ==
Representing Japan
Year	Competition	Venue	Position	Event	Notes
2007	World Championships	Osaka, Japan	13th	Marathon	2:20:53
2010	Asian Games	Guangzhou, China	7th	Marathon	2:18:24

== Personal bests ==
- 5000 metres - 13:57.71 min (2007)
- 10,000 metres - 28:32.00 min (2006)
- Half marathon - 1:02:53 hrs (2005)
- Marathon - 2:09:43 hrs (2004)
