= Francesco Bona =

Italian long-distance runner

Personal information
- National team: Italy
- Born: 19 December 1983 (age 42) Biella, Italy

Sport
- Country: Italy
- Sport: Athletics
- Event: Long-distance running
- Club: Centro Sportivo Aeronautica Militare

Achievements and titles
- Personal bests: Half marathon: 1:3.52 (2011); Marathon: 2:14:59 (2011)
Medal record
Universiade
Bronze medal – third place	2009 Belgrade	Half marathon
European 10,000m Cup
Bronze medal – third place	2008 Istanbul	Team

Francesco Bona (born 19 December 1983) is an Italian former long-distance runner who competed at individual senior level at the 2009 IAAF World Half Marathon Championships.

He won a medal at the 2009 Summer Universiade.

== Biography ==
After the end of his sports career, Bona worked as an engineer in his hometown of Biella.

== National titles ==
He won a national championships at individual senior level.

- Italian Athletics Championships
  - Half marathon: 2011

== See also ==
- Italian team at the running events
