= Ji Young-jun =

South Korean long-distance runner (born 1981)

Personal information
- Born: October 15, 1981 (age 44)
Medal record
Men's Athletics
Representing South Korea
Asian Games
Gold medal – first place	2010 Guangzhou	Marathon

Ji Young-jun (Korean: 지영준; Hanja: 池永駿; born 15 October 1981 in Seoul) is a South Korean long-distance runner who specializes in the marathon. His personal best times are 13:49.99 minutes in the 5000 metres, achieved in June 2006 in Shibetsu; 29:42.38 minutes in the 10,000 metres, achieved in June 2002 in Uijeongbu; and 2:08:30 hours in the marathon, achieved in April 2009 in Daegu.

He finished seventeenth at the 2004 Olympic Games, and seventh at the 2006 Asian Games. He also competed at the 2003 and 2009 World Championships; on the latter occasion he did not finish the race.

After a few years off his top form, he re-established himself at the 2009 Daegu Marathon by knocking thirteen seconds off his best to win the race in a time of 2:08:30.

He won the gold medal in the marathon at the 2010 Asian games in Guangzhou, China, running 2:11:11.

== Achievements ==
Year	Competition	Venue	Position	Event	Notes
Representing South Korea
2003	World Championships	Paris, France	52nd	Marathon	2:20:21
2004	Olympic Games	Athens, Greece	17th	Marathon	2:16:14
2006	Asian Games	Doha, Qatar	6th	Marathon	2:19:35
2009	Daegu Marathon	Daegu, South Korea	1st	Marathon	2:08:30
2009	World Championships	Berlin, Germany	—	Marathon	DNF
2010	Asian Games	Guangzhou, China	1st	Marathon	2:11:11
