= Ri Kum-song =

North Korean long-distance runner

- Hangul: 리금성
- RR: Ri Geumseong
- MR: Ri Kŭmsŏng

Ri Kum-Song (Korean: 리금성; born 23 May 1980) is a North Korean long-distance runner who specializes in the marathon.

He competed in the 2008 Olympic marathon. He also finished eighth at the 2006 Asian Games.

His personal best time is 2:14:30 hours, achieved at the 2007 Pyongyang Marathon.
