= Laban Kagika =

Kenyan long-distance runner

Laban Kagika (born July 17, 1978) is a male long-distance runner from Kenya who won the Hokkaido Marathon in 2004. He set his personal best (2:10:24) in the men's marathon race in the 2001 edition of the Fukuoka Marathon.

Laban has also started training young athletes in his home in Nyahururu.

== Achievements ==
Year	Competition	Venue	Position	Event	Notes
Representing Kenya
2001	Fukuoka Marathon	Fukuoka, Japan	4th	Marathon	2:10:24
2003	Fukuoka Marathon	Fukuoka, Japan	18th	Marathon	2:16:47
2003	Lake Biwa Marathon	Ōtsu, Japan	4th	Marathon	2:10:43
2004	Hokkaido Marathon	Sapporo, Japan	1st	Marathon	2:12:20
2007	Lake Biwa Marathon	Ōtsu, Japan	4th	Marathon	2:12:36
2007	World Championships	Osaka, Japan	52nd	Marathon	2:37:13
2008	Hokkaido Marathon	Sapporo, Japan	8th	Marathon	2:17:54
2009	Hokkaido Marathon	Sapporo, Japan	3rd	Marathon	2:12:24
