= Khalid Kamal Yaseen =

Bahraini long-distance runner

Khalid Kamal Yaseen (born 10 October 1982) is a Bahraini long-distance runner who specializes in the marathon.

He was born in Kenya as Peter Ndegwa, but changed name and nationality in 2005. He won the silver medal at the 2006 Asian Games. He finished 29th at the 2007 World Championships, 39th at the 2008 World Cross Country Championships and 40th at the 2007 World Championships. He won the Madrid Marathon in 2009.

His personal best times are 28:10.89 minutes in the 10,000 metres, achieved in June 2006 in Neerpelt; 1:02:35 hours in the half marathon, achieved in April 2005 in Manama; and 2:11:43 hours in the marathon, achieved in May 2008 in Düsseldorf.

== Achievements ==
Year	Competition	Venue	Position	Event	Notes
Representing Bahrain
2006	Asian Games	Doha, Qatar	2nd	Marathon	2:15:36
2007	World Championships	Osaka, Japan	29th	Marathon	2:26:32
2007	Pan Arab Games	Cairo, Egypt	5th	Half marathon	1:05.33
2009	World Championships	Berlin, Germany	40th	Marathon	2:20:11
2010	West Asian Championships	Aleppo, Syria	2nd	Half marathon	1:02:27
2010	Asian Games	Guangzhou, China	5th	Marathon	2:15:52
2011	World Championships	Daegu, South Korea	–	Marathon	DNF
2011	Pan Arab Games	Doha, Qatar	2nd	Half marathon	1:04:31
