= Johannes Kekana =

South African long-distance runner

Johannes Kekana (born 25 April 1972) is a South African long-distance runner who specialized in the marathon.

He won the marathon event at the 2003 All-Africa Games. In addition to several marathon wins on home soil, he finished seventeenth at the 2009 World Championships and second at the 2010 Stockholm Marathon.

His personal best times were 1:02:14 hours in the half marathon, achieved in July 2009 in Port Elizabeth; 1:19:19 hours in the 25 kilometres, achieved in May 2010 in Pretoria; and 2:14:37 hours in the marathon, achieved in September 2002 in Sion's Town.
