= Su Wei (athlete) =

Chinese long-distance runner

Su Wei (born 7 October 1982) is a Chinese long-distance runner who specialises in the marathon. His personal best time is 2:14:48 hours, achieved in March 2006 in the Xiamen Marathon.

He finished sixth at the 2006 Asian Games and 33rd at the 2007 World Championships. He also competed at the 2006 World Cross Country Championships.

== Achievements ==
Year	Competition	Venue	Position	Event	Notes
Representing China
2007	World Championships	Osaka, Japan	33rd	Marathon	2:28:41
