= Toshinari Suwa =

Japanese marathon runner (born 1977)

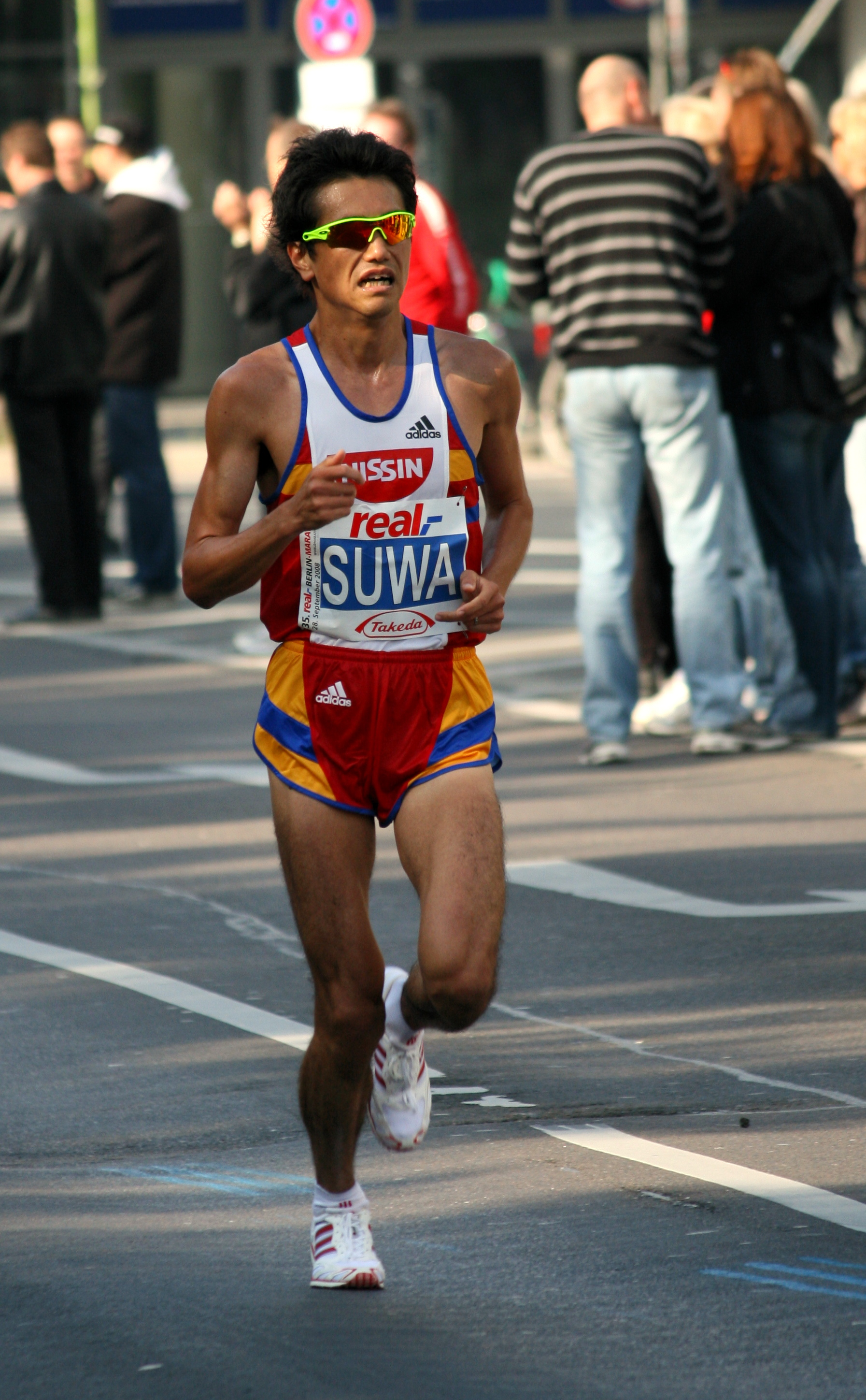
- Toshinari Suwa at the 2008 Berlin Marathon

Personal information
- Native name: 諏訪 利成
- Nationality: Japanese
- Born: 29 January 1977 (age 49) Isesaki, Japan

Sport
- Country: Japan
- Sport: Athletics
- Event: Long-distance running

Toshinari Suwa (諏訪 利成; born 29 January 1977) is a Japanese marathon runner from Isesaki, Gunma Prefecture, Japan.

== Career ==
He finished sixth at the 2004 Summer Olympics and seventh at the 2007 World Championships.

His personal best time is 2:07:55, achieved in December 2003 at the Fukuoka Marathon. In the half marathon his personal best time is 1:03:00 hours, achieved in July 2003 in Sapporo. He also has 28:15.45 minutes in the 10,000 metres.

== Achievements ==
Year	Competition	Venue	Position	Event	Notes
Representing Japan
2004	Olympic Games	Athens, Greece	6th	Marathon	2:13:24
2007	World Championships	Osaka, Japan	7th	Marathon	2:18:35
