= Deng Haiyang =

Chinese long-distance runner

Deng Haiyang (born 15 October 1984 in Kunming, Yunnan) is a Chinese long-distance runner who specializes in the marathon.

He competed at the 2006 Asian Games and the 2007 World Championships. He represented his country at the 2008 Summer Olympics, placing 25th.

== Achievements ==
Year	Competition	Venue	Position	Event	Notes
Representing China
2007	World Championships	Osaka, Japan	36th	Marathon	2:29:37

== Personal bests ==
- 10,000 metres - 29:07.06 min (2003)
- Marathon - 2:10:43 hrs (2008)
