= William Kiplagat =

Kenyan long-distance runner

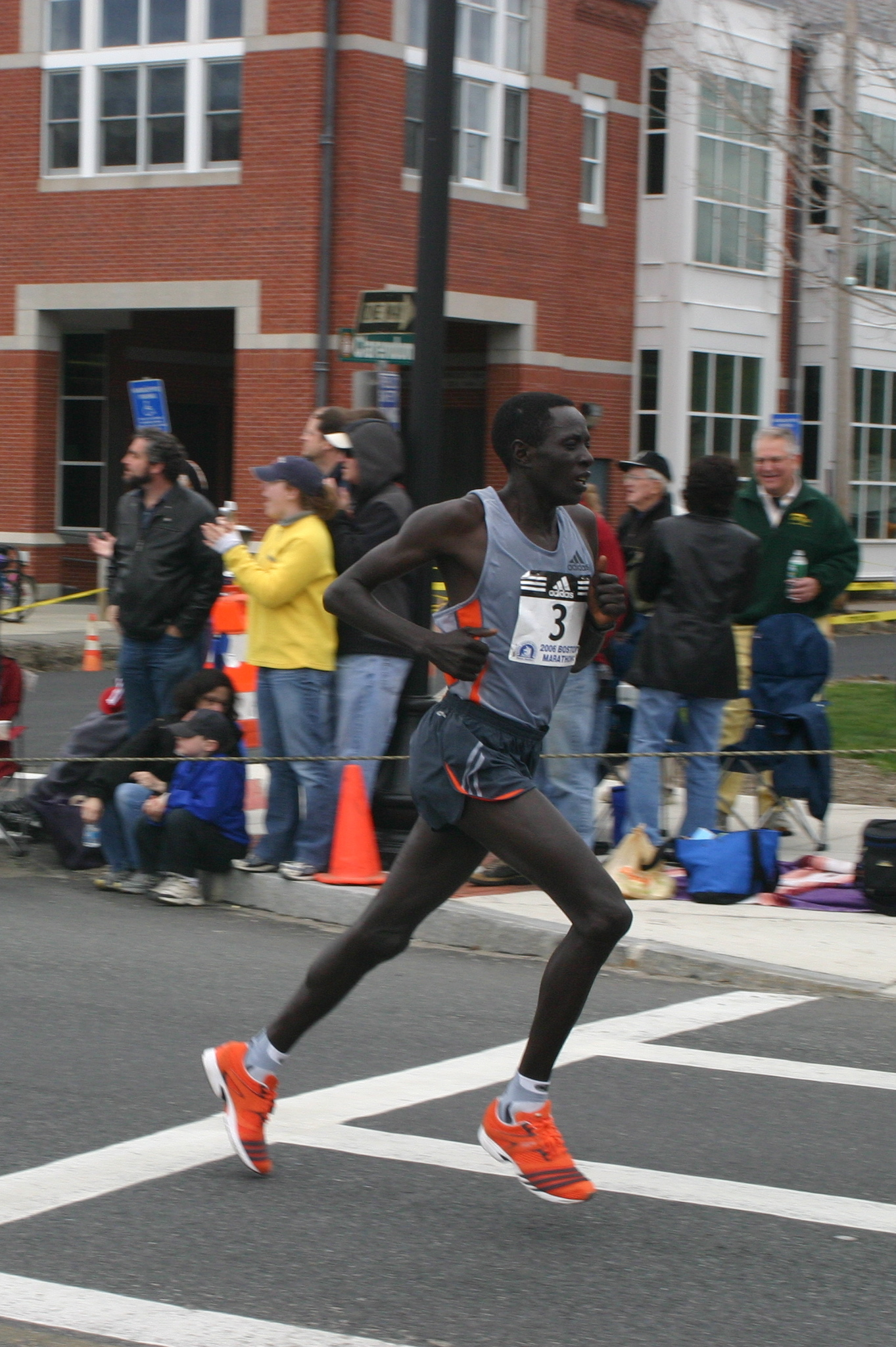
William Kiplagat, Boston, 2006

William Kiplagat (born June 21, 1972) is a long-distance runner from Kenya. He ran his personal best of 2:06:50 hours in the 1999 Amsterdam Marathon.

He finished eighth at the 2007 World Championships. He won the Portugal Half Marathon in 2004. In 2009 he finished third in the Frankfurt Marathon with a fast time (2:07:05 hours), even though he was quoted as saying he is now more like a coach than a runner.

He is an uncle to Florence Kiplagat, another Kenyan international level runner.

== Achievements ==
- All results regarding marathon, unless stated otherwise

Year	Competition	Venue	Position	Notes
Representing Kenya
1999	Amsterdam Marathon	Amsterdam, Netherlands	3rd	2:06:50
1999	Cleveland Marathon	Cleveland, United States	3rd	2:14:16
2000	London Marathon	London, United Kingdom	4th	2:09:06
2000	Chicago Marathon	Chicago, United States	6th	2:11:57
2001	Berlin Marathon	Berlin, Germany	3rd	2:09:55
2001	Prague Marathon	Prague, Czech Republic	3rd	2:10:29
2002	London Marathon	London, United Kingdom	13th	2:15:59
2003	Rotterdam Marathon	Rotterdam, Netherlands	1st	2:07:42
2003	World Championships	Paris, France	—	DNF
2003	Amsterdam Marathon	Amsterdam, Netherlands	3rd	2:07:50
2004	London Marathon	London, United Kingdom	12th	2:12:04
2004	JoongAng Seoul Marathon	Seoul, South Korea	6th	2:12:04
2005	Rotterdam Marathon	Rotterdam, Netherlands	10th	2:12:10
2005	JoongAng Seoul Marathon	Seoul, South Korea	1st	2:08:27
2006	Boston Marathon	Boston, United States	8th	2:13:26
2007	Lake Biwa Marathon	Ōtsu, Japan	2nd	2:10:47
2007	World Championships	Osaka, Japan	8th	2:19:21
2007	Seoul International Marathon	Seoul, South Korea	8th	2:14:20
2008	Frankfurt Marathon	Frankfurt, Germany	10th	2:10:53
2009	Frankfurt Marathon	Frankfurt, Germany	3rd	2:07:05
