= Getuli Bayo =

Tanzanian marathon runner (born 1980)

Personal information
- Nationality: Tanzania
- Born: Getuli Amnaay Bayo; 7 June 1980 (age 46)
- Height: 1.70 m (5 ft 7 in)
- Weight: 60 kg (132 lb)

Sport
- Sport: Athletics
- Event: Marathon

Achievements and titles
- Personal best: Marathon: 2:10:45

Getuli Amnaay Bayo (born June 27, 1980) is a Tanzanian marathon runner. He set his personal best time of 2:10:45, by finishing third at the 2005 Zurich Marathon. He is also the brother of Zebedayo Bayo, who competed for the same event at the 2000 Summer Olympics in Sydney, and at the 2004 Summer Olympics in Athens.

At age twenty-eight, Bayo made his official debut for the 2008 Summer Olympics in Beijing, where he competed in the men's marathon, along with his compatriot Samson Ramadhani. He did not finish the entire race, before reaching the halfway mark of the course.
