= Yared Asmerom =

Eritrean long-distance runner

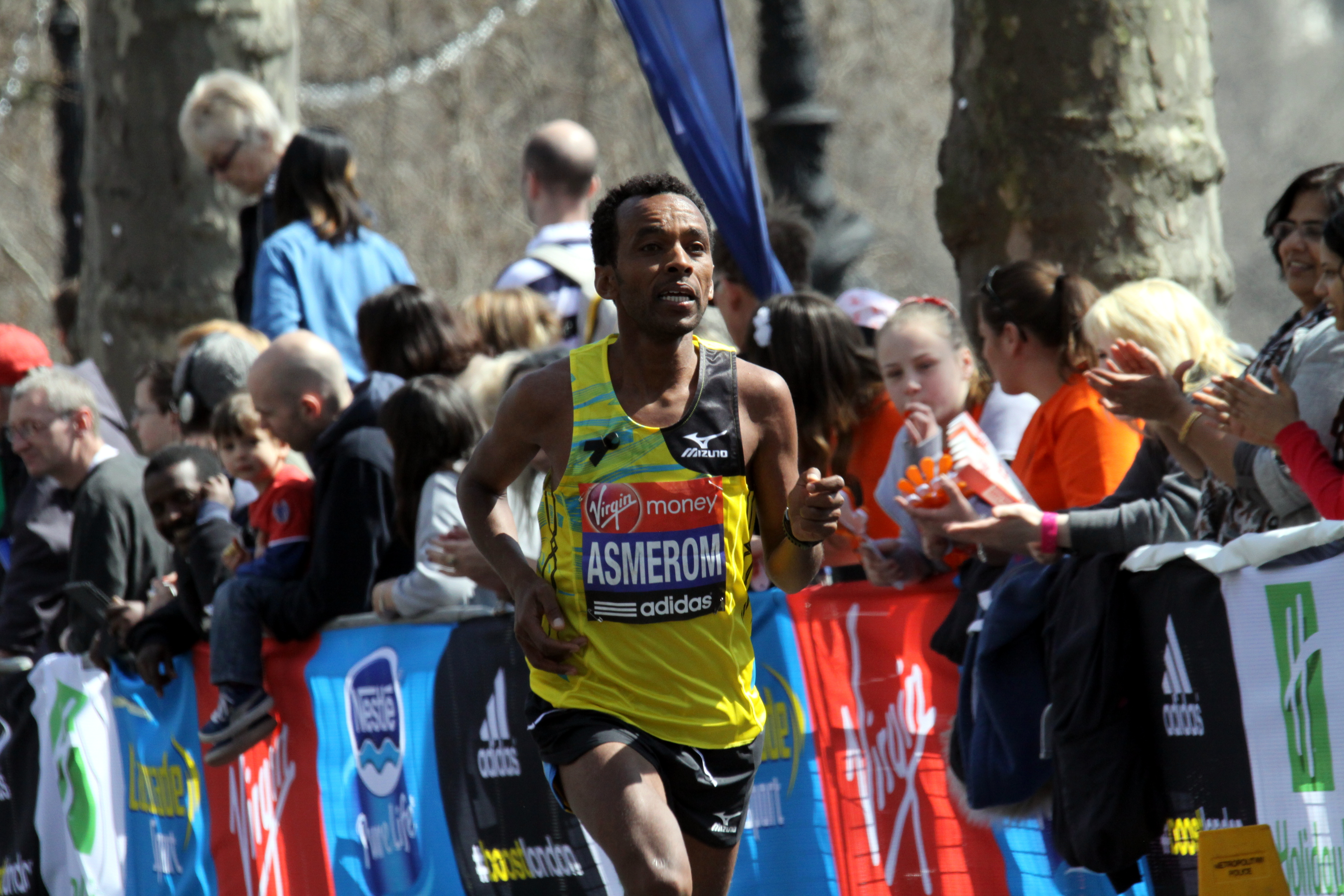
- Yared Asmerom during 2013 London Marathon

Personal information
- Born: 4 February 1980 (age 45) Asmara, Ethiopia
- Height: 1.71 m (5 ft 7 1/2 in)
- Weight: 58 kg (128 lb)

Sport
- Country: Eritrea
- Sport: Athletics
- Event: Marathon
- Updated on 22 July 2012

Yared Asmerom Tesfit (born 4 February 1980) is an Eritrean long-distance runner who specializes in the marathon races.

== Biography ==
In 2005 he finished ninth at the World Half Marathon Championships and 25th at the World Championships. In 2006 he competed at the World Road Running Championships but did not finish the race. He finished fourth in the marathon at the 2007 World Championships. He also ran in the half marathon at the 2007 All-Africa Games that year, but finished in fifteenth place.

He made his Olympic debut at the 2008 Beijing Games and was his country's best performer in the marathon, finishing in eighth place. He made further appearances in Eritrea's World Championships marathon squad, but failed to finish the distance in both 2009 and 2011.

On the road running circuit, he set a personal best time of 2:08:34 hours at the Lake Biwa Marathon and finished as runner-up. He returned to that event the following year and again reached the podium, coming third in a time of 2:10:49 hours. He improved his personal best to 2:07:27 hours at the Chuncheon International Marathon, where he was second behind Stanley Biwott.

== Achievements ==
Year	Competition	Venue	Position	Event	Notes
Representing Eritrea
2005	World Half Marathon Championships	Edmonton, Canada	9th	Half Marathon	1:02:44 (PB)
2007	World Championships	Osaka, Japan	4th	Marathon	2:17:41

== Personal bests ==
- Half marathon - 1:00:28 hrs (2007)
- Marathon - 2:07:27 hrs (2011)
