= José Teles de Souza =

Brazilian long-distance runner

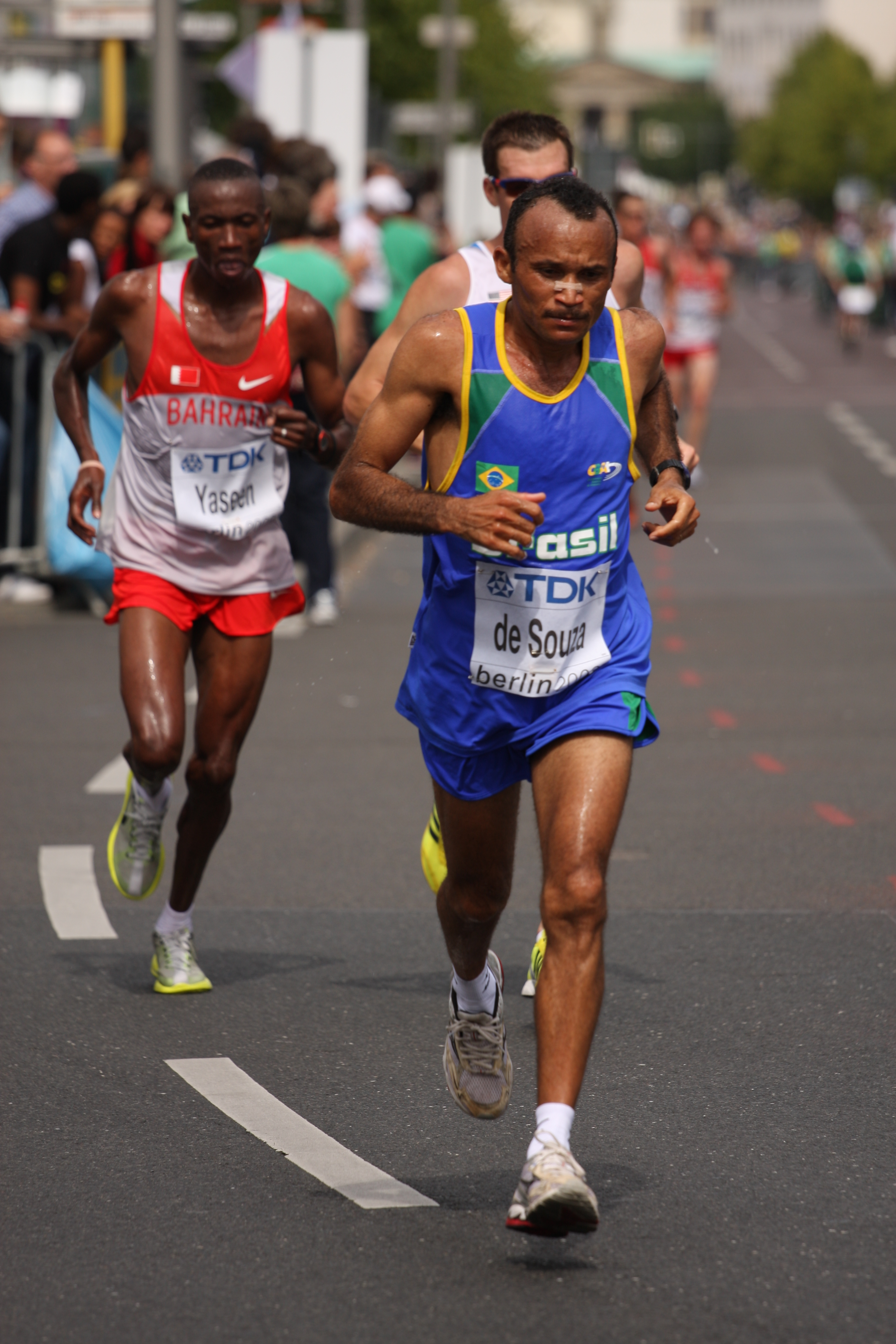
José de Souza, Berlin 2009

José Teles de Souza (born 22 April 1971 in Teresina, Piauí) is a Brazilian long-distance runner. He finished eighteenth in the marathon at the 2007 World Championships.

== Achievements ==
Year	Competition	Venue	Position	Event	Notes
Representing Brazil
2007	World Championships	Osaka, Japan	18th	Marathon	2:22:24

== Personal bests ==
- 10,000 metres - 28:46.6 min (1997)
- Half marathon - 1:04:33 hrs
- Marathon - 2:13:25 hrs (1999)
