= Luke Kibet Bowen =

Kenyan long-distance runner

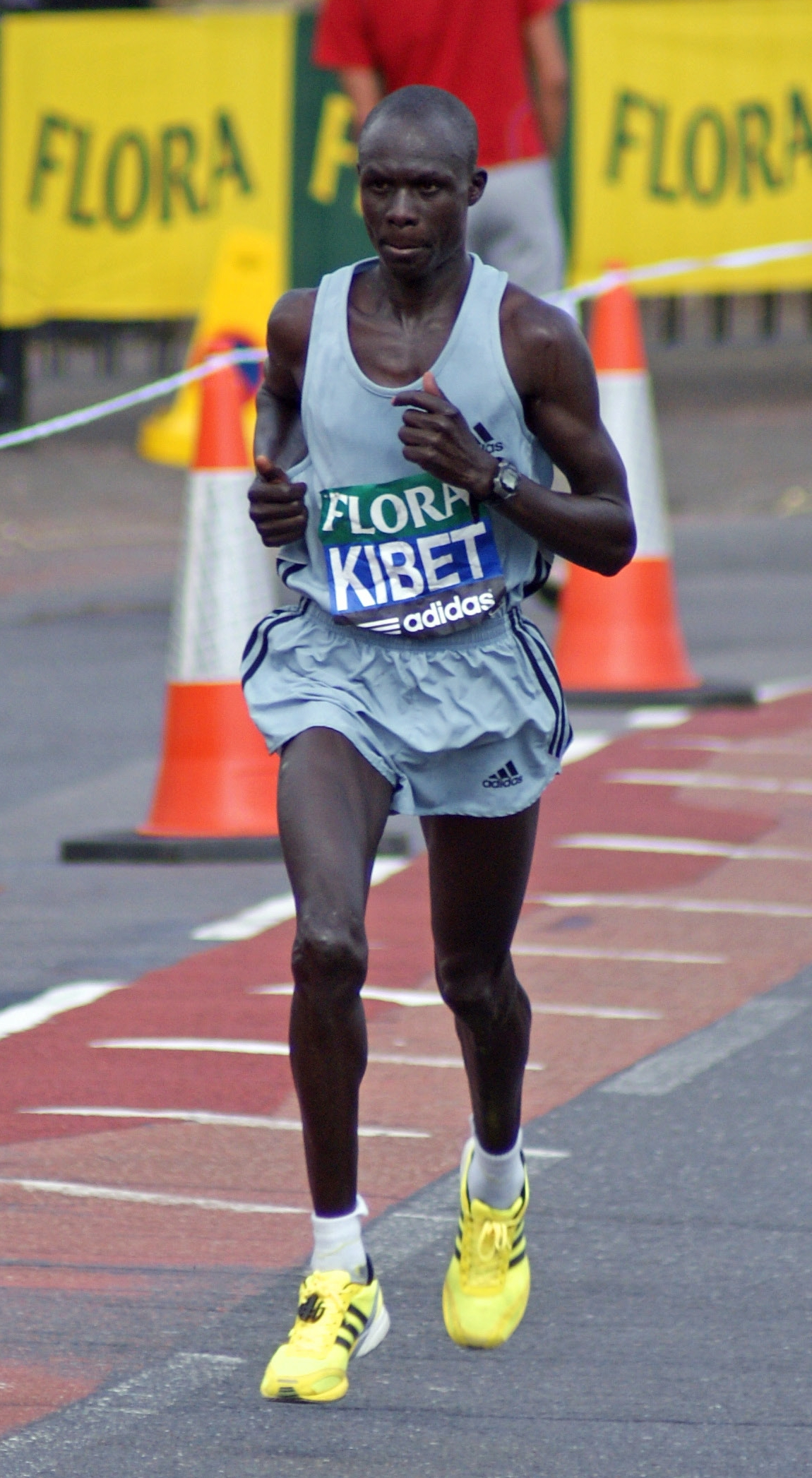
- Luke Kibet at the 2009 London Marathon
Medal record
Men's athletics
Representing Kenya
World Championships
Gold medal – first place	2007 Osaka	Marathon

Luke Kibet Bowen (born 12 April 1983) is a Kenyan long-distance runner who specializes in the marathon. He won the marathon race at the 2007 World Championships.

== Career ==
=== Early career ===
Kibet was born in Kaplelach village, Moiben division, Uasin Gishu District. Famed Kenyan runners Samson Kitur and Noah Ngeny come from the same area.

Kibet took up running in 1996, aged 13, impressed by the Kenyan performances at the 1996 Summer Olympics. He went to Moiben Secondary School from 1997 to 2000 and then joined Kenya Prisons Service.

Kibet originally specialized in the steeplechase, his personal best being 8:25.4 minutes. In 2003, he won the Tilburg Ten Miles race in Tilburg, Netherlands. He ran his first half marathon in 2003, finishing fourth in the City-Pier-City Loop in the Hague.

He took up the marathon in 2004 and reached the international level in this event. Kibet entered his first marathon, 2004 Enschede Marathon, as a pacemaker, but finished the race at 2nd position timing 2:11:06. He finished second also at the 2004 Frankfurt Marathon. He also won a 25-km race in Berlin that year.

Kibet won Taipei Marathon in 2005 and 2006. His personal best time is 2:08:52 hours, achieved in October 2005 in Eindhoven where he finished third. In the half marathon his personal best time is 1:00:43 hours, achieved in September 2006 in Rotterdam Half Marathon, where he finished sixth.

=== World champion ===
Kibet won the Vienna Marathon in 2007. He won the gold medal at the 2007 World Championships in Athletics in a time of 2:15:59 hours. It was the first Kenyan marathon victory at the World Championships since Douglas Wakiihuri in 1987. Kibet's win was a surprise given that before the race the Kenyan marathon team was termed by many as the "worst ever assembled".

On 28 October 2007 he won the Great South Run 10-mile race in Portsmouth, England.

=== Later career ===
During the 2007–08 riots in Kenya, Kibet was attacked by a mob and hurt heavily by a stone, which hit his head.

Kibet took part at the 2008 London Marathon and finished 11th, but was not well prepared due to injury. He was a late entrant to the 2008 Olympic Marathon, after Robert Kipkoech Cheruiyot pulled out. Kibet did not finish the Olympic race. He finished the otherwise disappointing year by winning Singapore Marathon in December, setting a new course record of 2:13:01.

He began the 2009 season by winning the Lagos Half Marathon in February. He did not finish his next marathon, London Marathon in April 2009, but he successfully defended the Singapore Marathon title, breaking again the course record (new record 2.11.25 minutes).

== Personal life ==
Kibet is married to Lydia with two children (as of 2008). He currently does most of his training at Moses Tanui's training camp in Kaptagat.

He is not to be confused with another Kenyan marathon runner named Luke Kibet, who is eight years older and won the Country Music Marathon in 2004.

== Achievements ==
Year	Competition	Venue	Position	Event	Notes
Representing Kenya
2001	Amsterdam Marathon	Amsterdam, Netherlands	3rd	Marathon	2:10:18
2007	Vienna City Marathon	Vienna, Austria	1st	Marathon	2:10:07
2007	World Championships	Osaka, Japan	1st	Marathon	2:15:59
2008	Singapore Marathon	Singapore	1st	Marathon	2:11:25
2009	Singapore Marathon	Singapore	1st	Marathon	2:13:01
