= Daniel Kipkorir Chepyegon =

Ugandan marathon runner

Daniel Kipkorir Chepyegon (born 1 June 1986) is a Ugandan professional marathon runner.

He was eighth at the Nairobi Marathon recording a time of 2:14:54. He gained selection for the men's marathon at the 2009 World Championships in Athletics and was the only Ugandan to finish the race in Berlin, completing the course in 2:17:47 for 31st place. He recorded a time of 2:17:07 for fourth place at the 2010 Kuala Lumpur Marathon.

He ran at the 2010 Frankfurt Marathon and significantly improved his personal best time to 2:08:24, finishing in fifth place. This run marked an improvement upon Alex Malinga's previous Ugandan record by almost four minutes. His coach, Ronnie Kasirye, said Chepyegon's achievement was an indication of the country's potential in long-distance running: "It shows that we have the talent and only need to develop it with good training". In four years, Chepyegon had gone from a barefoot runner at local races in Kampala to a professional athlete competing alongside the world's top runners.
