= Chang Chia-che =

Taiwanese long-distance runner

Chang Chia-che 張嘉哲
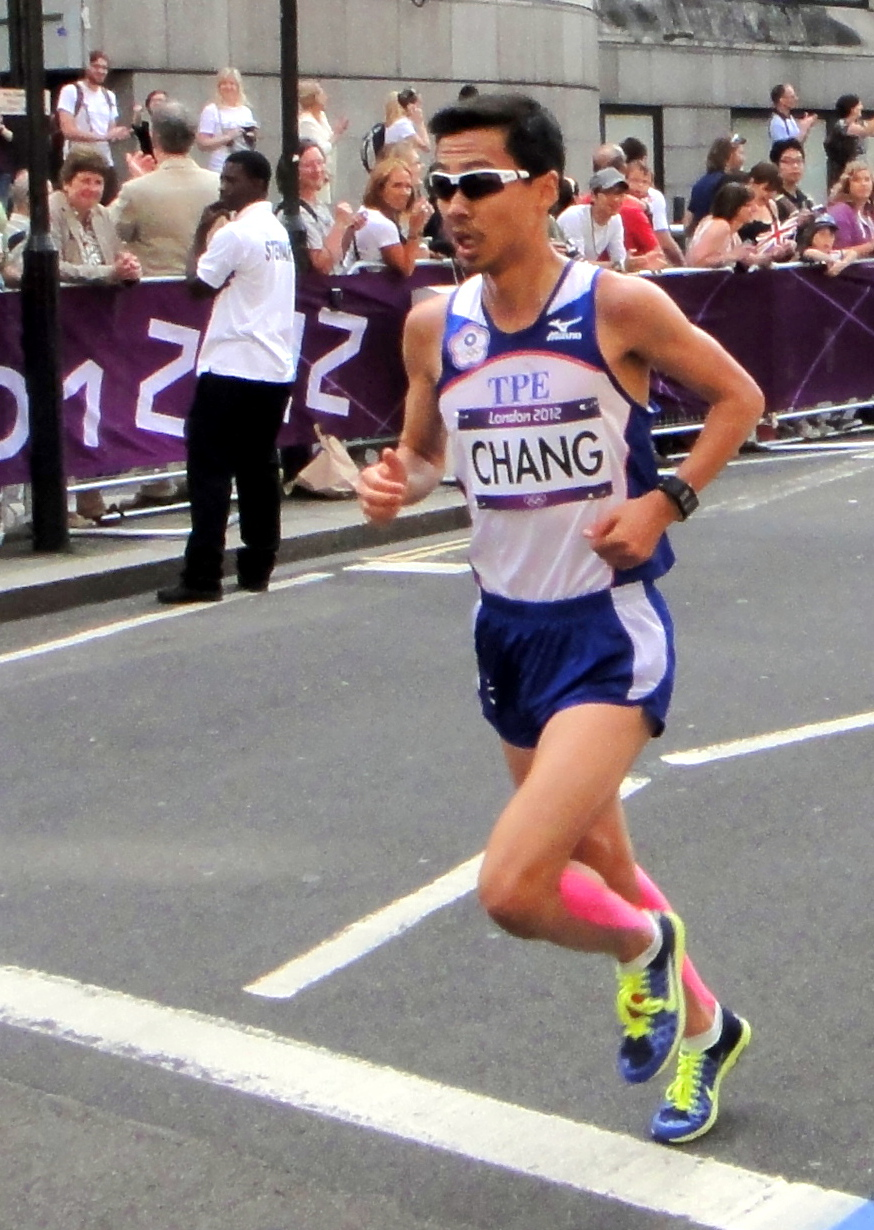
- Chang Chia-che in the marathon at the 2012 Summer Olympics in London

Personal information
- Born: 22 April 1983 (age 43)
- Height: 1.73 m (5 ft 8 in)
- Weight: 56 kg (123 lb)

Sport
- Country: Chinese Taipei
- Sport: Athletics
- Event: Marathon

Chang Chia-che (Chinese: 張嘉哲; pinyin: Zhāng Jiāzhé; born 22 April 1983) is a Taiwanese long-distance runner who specializes in the marathon.

He finished tenth at the 2006 Asian Games, 28th at the 2007 World Championships, 38th at the 2009 World Championships, and 32nd at the 2013 World Championships. In regional competition, he was the bronze medallist in the half marathon at the 2009 East Asian Games. He placed tenth in the marathon at the 2010 Asian Games, repeating his position from the last edition.

He was third at the 2008 Hofu Yomiuri Marathon and ran a personal best time of 2:17:12 hours. He improved upon this four seasons later at the 2012 Pyongyang Marathon, where his time of 2:16:06 hours brought him seventh place.

== Achievements ==
Year	Competition	Venue	Position	Event	Notes
2007	World Championships	Osaka, Japan	28th	Marathon	2:26:22
2009	World Championships	Berlin, Germany	38th	Marathon	2:19:32
2012	Olympic Games	London, Great Britain	77th	Marathon	2:29:58
2013	World Championships	Moscow, Russia	32nd	Marathon	2:20:02
