= Tsuyoshi Ogata =

Japanese long-distance runner

Tsuyoshi Ogata (尾方 剛, Ogata Tsuyoshi; born May 11, 1973) is a Japanese long-distance athlete competing mainly in the marathon.

Ogata was born in Kumano, Hiroshima. In August 2003 he came twelfth at the 2003 World Championships in Paris. In August 2005 he won a bronze medal at the 2005 World Championships in Helsinki. He then finished fifth at the 2007 World Championships.

== Achievements ==
Year	Competition	Venue	Position	Event	Notes
Representing Japan
1999	Fukuoka Marathon	Fukuoka, Japan	24th	Marathon	2:15:22
2000	Rotterdam Marathon	Rotterdam, Netherlands	16th	Marathon	2:11:43
2001	Berlin Marathon	Berlin, Germany	4th	Marathon	2:10:06
2002	Fukuoka Marathon	Fukuoka, Japan	2nd	Marathon	2:09:15
2003	World Championships	Paris, France	12th	Marathon	2:10:39
2003	Fukuoka Marathon	Fukuoka, Japan	6th	Marathon	2:08:37
2004	Fukuoka Marathon	Fukuoka, Japan	1st	Marathon	2:09:10
2005	World Championships	Helsinki, Finland	3rd	Marathon	2:11:16
2006	Fukuoka Marathon	Fukuoka, Japan	6th	Marathon	2:10:48
2007	World Championships	Osaka, Japan	5th	Marathon	2:17:42
2008	Beijing Summer Olympics	Beijing, China	13th	Marathon	2:13:26
2012	Ehime Marathon	Matsuyama, Japan	2nd	Marathon	2:17:53

== Personal bests ==
- 3000 metres - 8:01.86 min (2004)
- 5000 metres - 13:31.46 min (2003)
- 10,000 metres - 28:05.76 min (2004)
- Half marathon - 1:01:50 hrs (2002)
- Marathon - 2:08:37 hrs (2003)
