= Oleg Kulkov =

Russian marathon runner

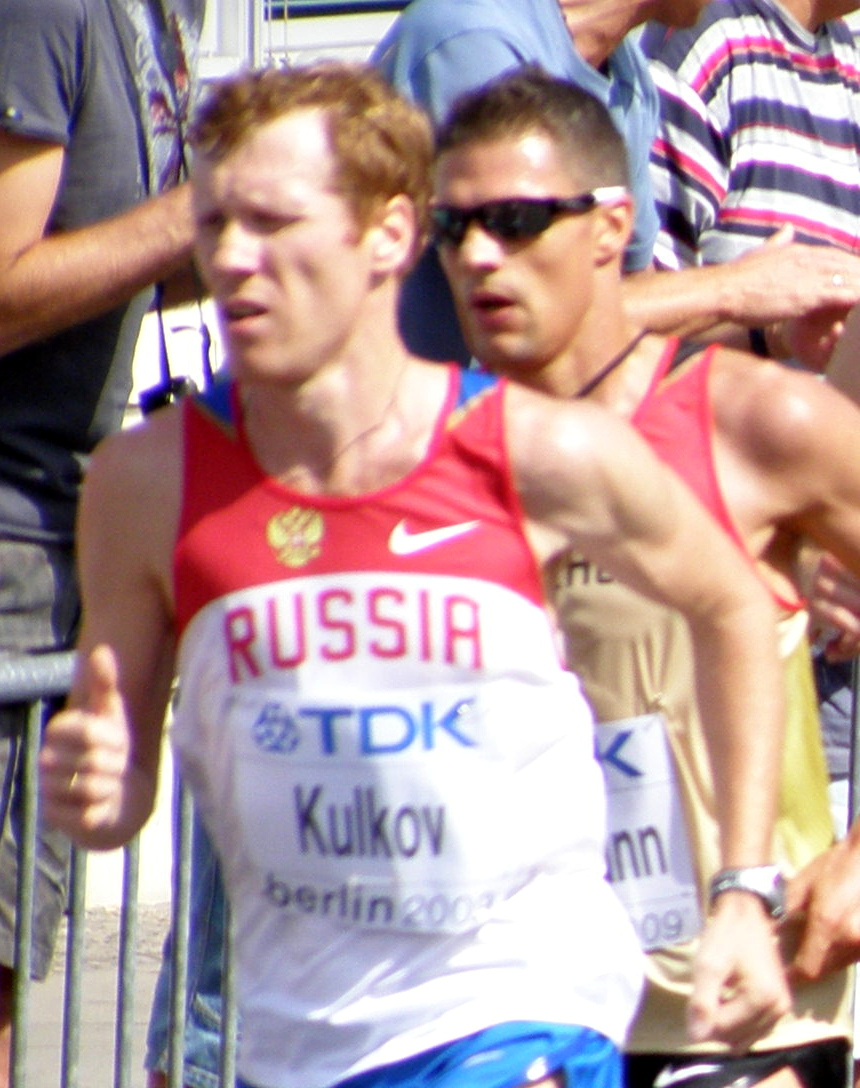
Marathon Leichtathletik Weltmeisterschaft Berlin 2009

Oleg Sergeyevich Kulkov (Russian: Олег Сергеевич Кульков; born March 6, 1978, in Verkhnyaya Pyshma) is a Russian marathon runner.

== Biography ==
He won the Zurich Marathon in 2008, recording a personal best time of 2:11:15. This qualified him to represent Russia at the 2008 Summer Olympics and he finished 29th overall in the marathon at the 2008 Beijing Games. He improved his best to 2:10:13 with a second-place finish in Zurich and went on to take 20th place at the 2009 World Championships in Athletics. The following year, he was fifteenth in the European Marathon Championship race.

He equalled his personal best time at the 2011 Seoul International Marathon, taking third place behind Abderrahim Goumri and Jeong Jin-Hyeong. That October, he ran another race in Korea, the Gyeongju International Marathon, and finished in fifth place.
