= Mubarak Hassan Shami =

Qatari long-distance runner

Mubarak Hassan Shami (Arabic: مبارك حسن شامي, born Richard Yatich on December 1, 1980) is a Kenyan-born Qatari long-distance runner. He specializes in half marathon and marathon races.

== Biography ==
Shami won the Baringo Half Marathon, a race inaugurated by Paul Tergat, in 2005 and 2006, becoming the first runner to defend the title.

In October 2005, he won a silver medal at the 2005 World Half Marathon Championships. He won the Paris Marathon on April 15, 2007.

Shami won the silver medal at the 2007 World Championships. His last marathon victory was in Otsu (2008) with a time of 2:08:23. He is coached by Renato Canova.

== Achievements ==
Year	Competition	Venue	Position	Event	Notes
Representing Qatar
2005	Vienna Marathon	Vienna, Austria	1st	Marathon	2:12:20
2005	Venice Marathon	Venice, Italy	1st	Marathon	2:09:22
2005	World Half Marathon Championships	Edmonton, Canada	2nd	Half Marathon	1:01:09 (NR)
2006	Prague Marathon	Prague, Czech Republic	1st	Marathon	2:11:11
2006	Asian Games	Doha, Qatar	1st	Marathon	2:12:44
2007	Paris Marathon	Paris, France	1st	Marathon	2:07:17
2007	World Championships	Osaka, Japan	2nd	Marathon	2:17:18
2008	Lake Biwa Marathon	Ōtsu, Japan	1st	Marathon	2:08:23
2010	Asian Games	Guangzhou, China	3rd	Marathon	2:12:53

Sporting positions
Preceded by (Netherlands) Kamiel Maase	Men's Zevenheuvelenloop Winner (15 km); 2003	Succeeded by (Ethiopia) Sileshi Sihine
