= Athletics at the 2000 Summer Olympics – Men's 3000 metres steeplechase =

Men's 3000 metres steeplechase at the Games of the XXVII Olympiad
- Venue: Stadium Australia
- Date: 27 September 2000 (heats); 29 September 2000 (final)
- Competitors: 40 from 29 nations
- Winning time: 8:21.43

Medalists
1st place, gold medalist(s)		Reuben Kosgei; Kenya
2nd place, silver medalist(s)		Wilson Boit Kipketer; Kenya
3rd place, bronze medalist(s)		Ali Ezzine; Morocco

The Men's 3000 metres Steeplechase at the 2000 Summer Olympics as part of the athletics programme were held at Stadium Australia on Wednesday 27 September and Friday 29 September 2000. The winning margin was 0.34 seconds.

The top four runners in each of the initial three heats automatically qualified for the final. The next three fastest runners from across the heats also qualified.

Over the previous couple of months, the two Moroccan runners Ali Ezzine and Brahim Boulami had proven they could run with the Kenyans in sub-8:04 races. That still was not in the range of the capability of World Record holder Bernard Barmasai or previous record holder Wilson Boit Kipketer. But the Kenyans did not assert the same dominance they had displayed in the previous three Olympics.

Less than 100 metres into the race, Damian Kallabis fell over the first barrier. A loud sound went off in the stadium as if the race had been recalled, but none of the runners stopped and Kallabis rushed to catch up with the back of the pack. The third Kenyan was Reuben Kosgei, who had won the Athletics Kenya World Championship Trials, not world #2 Moses Kiptanui. The Kenyan trio, took their position at the point of the pack, but Ezzine made it clear he was going to run with them, taking the lead a lap and a half into the race. The Kenyans immediately stopped fighting to keep the lead, Luis Miguel Martin, Ezzine and Simon Vroemen took their turns at the front. After another lap and a half, Kosgei and Kipketer had had enough and moved back into the lead, taking Günther Weidlinger in their move to the front, with Barmasai, Boulami and Eliseo Martin at the back of the group of leaders. With a lap and a half to go, Eliseo Martin went around the pack to challenge Kosgei for the lead. Kosgei sped up just enough to discourage him. Then the Kenyan trio made the push to the front, just past a lap to go, all three were at the front, but Ezzine was right there with them. On the backstretch, Luis Miguel Martin made a rush to the front, again Kosgei wouldn't let him go by. Over the water jump, with all Kenyans taking it as conservatively as the rest of the field Kosgei and Martin arrived at the head of the straightaway almost together, with Kipketer and Barmasai right behind them. When the sprinting started, Martin could not go with them. Kipketer went around the outside, past Martin and into the lead over the last barrier. Kipketer had the advantage shoulder to shoulder with Kosgei, the two collided, Kipketer losing his balance and flailing as Kosgei took the lead back.sprinting to the finish. Kipketer struggled to cross the line in second, while Barmasai was falling further behind, passed by a sprinting Ezzine just before the line.

== Records ==
World and Olympic records prior to the Games
World Record	7:55.72	Bernard Barmasai	Kenya	Cologne, Germany	24 August 1997
Olympic Record	8:05.51	Julius Kariuki	Kenya	Seoul, South Korea	30 September 1988

== Medalists ==
Gold:	Silver:	Bronze:
Reuben Kosgei, Kenya	Wilson Boit Kipketer, Kenya	Ali Ezzine, Morocco

== Results ==
All times shown are in seconds.

- Q denotes qualification by place in heat.
- q denotes qualification by overall place.
- DNS denotes did not start.
- DNF denotes did not finish.
- DQ denotes disqualification.
- NR denotes national record.
- AR denotes area/continental record.
- OR denotes Olympic record.
- WR denotes world record.
- PB denotes personal best.
- SB denotes season best.

== Qualifying heats ==
Heat 1 of 3 Date: Wednesday 27 September 2000
Place		Athlete	Nation	Lane/Order	Time	Qual.	Record
Heat	Overall	Athlete	Nation	Lane/Order	Time	Qual.	Record
1	5	Reuben Kosgei	Kenya	4	8:23.17	Q	
2	7	Ali Ezzine	Morocco	5	8:23.79	Q	
3	10	Günther Weidlinger	Austria	12	8:24.07	Q	
4	13	Eliseo Martin	Spain	6	8:24.97	Q	
5	16	Mark Croghan	United States	11	8:25.88		
6	22	Bouabdellah Tahri	France	13	8:34.69		
7	25	Maru Daba	Ethiopia	7	8:35.34		
8	27	Florin Ionescu	Romania	3	8:37.44		
9	29	Serhiy Redko	Ukraine	1	8:40.51		
10	32	Christian Stephenson	Great Britain	8	8:46.66		
11	35	Mourad Benslimani	Algeria	2	8:59.07		
12	36	Chris Unthank	Australia	9	9:11.19		
13	39	Primo Higa	Solomon Islands	10	9:44.12		

Heat 2 of 3 Date: Wednesday 27 September 2000
Place		Athlete	Nation	Lane/Order	Time	Qual.	Record
Heat	Overall	Athlete	Nation	Lane/Order	Time	Qual.	Record
1	4	Bernard Barmasai	Kenya	6	8:23.08	Q	
2	6	Jim Svenøy	Norway	8	8:23.61	Q	SB
3	8	Khamis Abdullah Saifeldin	Qatar	11	8:23.94	Q	
4	9	Luis Miguel Martin	Spain	3	8:24.04	Q	
5	12	Damian Kallabis	Germany	4	8:24.48	q	
6	14	Gael Pencreach	France	13	8:25.35	q	
7	17	Joël Bourgeois	Canada	1	8:28.07		
8	20	Christian Belz	Switzerland	3	8:33.45		
9	21	Rafal Wojcik	Poland	9	8:33.51		
10	24	Anthony Cosey	United States	10	8:35.25		
11	31	El Arbi Khattabi	Morocco	7	8:43.46		
12	38	Giorgios Giannelis	Greece	5	9:19.14		
		Stathis Stasi	Cyprus	2	DNF		

Heat 3 of 3 Date: Wednesday 27 September 2000
Place		Athlete	Nation	Lane/Order	Time	Qual.	Record
Heat	Overall	Athlete	Nation	Lane/Order	Time	Qual.	Record
1	1	Laid Bessou	Algeria	1	8:21.14	Q	
2	2	Wilson Boit Kipketer	Kenya	5	8:22.07	Q	
3	3	Simon Vroemen	Netherlands	9	8:22.13	Q	
4	11	Brahim Boulami	Morocco	6	8:24.43	Q	
5	15	Manuel Silva	Portugal	14	8:25.70	q	
6	18	Pascal Dobert	United States	3	8:29.52		
7	19	Justin Chaston	Great Britain	4	8:31.01		
8	23	Lotfi Turki	Tunisia	12	8:34.84		
9	26	Salvador Miranda	Mexico	8	8:35.79		
10	28	Marco Cepeda	Spain	2	8:40.01		
11	30	Iaroslav Musinschi	Moldova	7	8:42.04		
12	33	Giuseppe Maffei	Italy	13	8:48.88		
13	34	Vladimir Pronin	Russia	11	8:57.69		
14	37	Eduardo Buenavista	Philippines	10	9:13.71		

Overall Results Round 1

Semi-Finals Overall Results
Place	Athlete	Nation	Heat	Lane/Order	Place	Time	Qual.	Record
1	Laid Bessou	Algeria	3	1	1	8:21.14	Q	
2	Wilson Boit Kipketer	Kenya	3	5	2	8:22.07	Q	
3	Simon Vroemen	Netherlands	3	9	3	8:22.13	Q	
4	Bernard Barmasai	Kenya	2	6	1	8:23.08	Q	
5	Reuben Kosgei	Kenya	1	4	1	8:23.17	Q	
6	Jim Svenøy	Norway	2	8	2	8:23:61	Q	SB
7	Ali Ezzine	Morocco	1	5	2	8:23.79	Q	
8	Khamis Abdullah Saifeldin	Qatar	2	11	2	8:23.94	Q	
9	Luis Miguel Martin	Spain	2	3	4	8:24.04	Q	
10	Günther Weidlinger	Austria	1	12	3	8:24.07	Q	
11	Brahim Boulami	Morocco	3	6	4	8:24.43	Q	
12	Damian Kallabis	Germany	2	4	5	8:24.48	Q	
13	Eliseo Martin	Spain	1	6	4	8:24.97	Q	
14	Gael Pencreach	France	2	13	6	8:25.35	q	
15	Manuel Silva	Portugal	3	14	15	8:25.70	q	
16	Mark Croghan	United States	1	11	5	8:25.88		
17	Joël Bourgeois	Canada	2	1	7	8:28.07		
18	Pascal Dobert	United States	3	3	6	8:29.52		
19	Justin Chaston	Great Britain	3	4	7	8:31.01		
20	Christian Belz	Switzerland	2	12	8	8:33.45		
21	Rafal Wojcik	Poland	2	9	9	8:33.51		
22	Bouabdellah Tahri	France	1	13	6	8:34.69		
23	Lotfi Turki	Tunisia	3	12	8	8:34.84		
24	Anthony Cosey	United States	2	10	10	8:35.25		
25	Maru Daba	Ethiopia	1	7	7	8:35.34		
26	Salvador Miranda	Mexico	3	8	9	8:35.79		
27	Florin Ionescu	Romania	1	3	8	8:37.44		
28	Marco Cepeda	Spain	3	2	10	8:40.01		
29	Sergiy Redko	Ukraine	1	1	9	8:40.51		
30	Iaroslav Musinschi	Moldova	3	7	11	8:42.04		
31	El Arbi Khattabi	Morocco	2	7	11	8:43.46		
32	Christian Stephenson	Great Britain	1	8	10	8:46.66		
33	Giuseppe Maffei	Italy	3	13	12	8:48.88		
34	Vladimir Pronin	Russia	3	11	13	8:57.69		
35	Mourad Benslimani	Algeria	1	2	11	8:59.07		
36	Chris Unthank	Australia	1	9	12	9:11.19		
37	Eduardo Buenavista	Philippines	3	10	14	9:13.71		
38	Giorgios Giannelis	Greece	2	5	12	9:19.14		
39	Primo Higa	Solomon Islands	1	10	13	9:44.12		
	Stathis Stasi	Cyprus	2	2		DNF		

== Finals ==
Finals Overall Results
Place	Athlete	Nation	Lane/Order	Time	Record
1st place, gold medalist(s)	Reuben Kosgei	Kenya	15	8:21.43	
2nd place, silver medalist(s)	Wilson Boit Kipketer	Kenya	14	8:21.77	
3rd place, bronze medalist(s)	Ali Ezzine	Morocco	13	8:22.15	
4	Bernard Barmasai	Kenya	11	8:22.23	
5	Luis Miguel Martin	Spain	12	8:22.75	
6	Eliseo Martin	Spain	1	8:23:00	
7	Brahim Boulami	Morocco	1	8:24.32	
8	Günther Weidlinger	Austria	3	8:26.70	
9	Jim Svenøy	Norway	7	8:27.20	
10	Khamis Abdullah Saifeldin	Qatar	6	8:30.89	
11	Laid Bessou	Algeria	8	8:33.07	
12	Simon Vroemen	Netherlands	9	8:37.87	
13	Manuel Silva	Portugal	2	8:38.63	
14	Gael Pencreach	France	5	8:41.19	
15	Damian Kallabis	Germany	10	9:09.78	
