= 1998 IAAF World Cross Country Championships – Men's short race =

Men's short race at the 1998 IAAF World Cross Country Championships
- Organisers: IAAF
- Edition: 26th
- Date: March 21
- Host city: Marrakesh, Morocco
- Venue: Menara district
- Events: 1
- Distances: 4 km – Men's short
- Participation: 103 athletes from 31 nations

The initial Men's short race at the 1998 IAAF World Cross Country Championships was held in Marrakesh, Morocco, at the Menara district on March 21, 1998. Reports on the event were given in The New York Times, in the Herald, and for the IAAF.

Complete results for individuals, for teams, medallists, and the results of British athletes were published.

== Race results ==
=== Men's short race (4 km) ===
==== Individual ====
Rank	Athlete	Country	Time
1st place, gold medalist(s)	John Kibowen	Kenya	10:43
2nd place, silver medalist(s)	Daniel Komen	Kenya	10:46
3rd place, bronze medalist(s)	Paul Kosgei	Kenya	10:50
4	Benjamin Limo	Kenya	10:59
5	John Kosgei	Kenya	11:04
6	Brahim Boulami	Morocco	11:06
7	Marc Davis	United States	11:08
8	Kipkirui Misoi	Kenya	11:10
9	Hicham Bouaouiche	Morocco	11:11
10	Maru Daba	Ethiopia	11:11
11	Isaac Viciosa	Spain	11:13
12	Ali Ezzine	Morocco	11:14
13	Mohamed Awol	Ethiopia	11:14
14	Luis Jesús	Portugal	11:16
15	Brahim Jabbour	Morocco	11:17
16	Salah El Ghazi	Morocco	11:19
17	Tewodros Shiferaw	Ethiopia	11:19
18	El Hassan Lahssini	Morocco	11:20
19	Alberto García	Spain	11:21
20	Simretu Alemayehu	Ethiopia	11:21
21	Dan Browne	United States	11:22
22	Hélder Ornelas	Portugal	11:23
23	João Junqueira	Portugal	11:23
24	Angelo Carosi	Italy	11:25
25	Laïd Bessou	Algeria	11:26
26	Miroslav Vanko	Slovakia	11:26
27	Manuel Pancorbo	Spain	11:26
28	Daniel Middleman	United States	11:27
29	João Leite	Brazil	11:27
30	Anacleto Jiménez	Spain	11:27
31	Luciano Di Pardo	Italy	11:27
32	Kudakwashe Shoko	Zimbabwe	11:28
33	Rafał Wójcik	Poland	11:28
34	Andrea Arlati	Italy	11:29
35	Phil Mowbray	United Kingdom	11:29
36	Mourad Benslimani	Algeria	11:29
37	Rob Whalley	United Kingdom	11:29
38	Abderahmane Djemadi	Algeria	11:30
39	Michael Ngaaseke	Zimbabwe	11:30
40	Abiyote Abate	Ethiopia	11:32
41	Joël Bourgeois	Canada	11:32
42	Mike Openshaw	United Kingdom	11:33
43	Aleksey Gorbunov	Russia	11:34
44	Domenico D'Ambrosio	Italy	11:34
45	Massimo Pegoretti	Italy	11:35
46	Juan José Cruz	Argentina	11:35
47	Saïd Chébili	France	11:36
48	Márcio da Silva	Brazil	11:36
49	José Ramos	Portugal	11:38
50	Moussa Barkaoui	France	11:38
51	Mekonen Daba	Ethiopia	11:39
52	Panagiotis Papoulias	Greece	11:41
53	Marco Rufo	Spain	11:42
54	Blair Martin	New Zealand	11:43
55	Julian Moorhouse	United Kingdom	11:43
56	Giuseppe Maffei	Italy	11:46
57	Mohamed Amer	United Arab Emirates	11:46
58	Shingirai Badza	Zimbabwe	11:47
59	Ian Gillespie	United Kingdom	11:49
60	Abdelmadjid Bouchamia	Algeria	11:50
61	Teddy Mitchell	United States	11:50
62	Vítor Almeida	Portugal	11:50
63	Éric Dubus	France	11:51
64	Reyes Estévez	Spain	11:52
65	Scott Strand	United States	11:53
66	Stéphane Renaud	France	11:54
67	Aleksey Shestakov	Kazakhstan	11:54
68	Mariano Tarilo	Argentina	11:57
69	Kamel Boulahfane	Algeria	12:00
70	Anthony Whiteman	United Kingdom	12:00
71	Cândido Maia	Portugal	12:00
72	Tamás Kliszek	Hungary	12:01
73	Richard Tremain	Canada	12:01
74	Daniel das Neves	Brazil	12:02
75	Ali Awad	Lebanon	12:02
76	Sander Schutgens	Netherlands	12:07
77	Miloud Abaoub	Algeria	12:09
78	Ahto Tatter	Estonia	12:09
79	Zenon Patino	Argentina	12:10
80	Ricardo da Silva	Brazil	12:11
81	Frédéric Chocteau	France	12:11
82	Abdul Sameer Moos	Mauritius	12:12
83	Elijah Mutandiro	Zimbabwe	12:13
84	Antonio Soliz	Argentina	12:20
85	Jason Bodnar	United States	12:27
86	Ali Al-Dosari	Bahrain	12:31
87	Arli Mandmets	Estonia	12:33
88	Makoto Wakamatsu	Japan	12:36
89	Simon Labiche	Seychelles	12:42
90	Mestal El-Sahmarani	Lebanon	12:44
91	Mahmoud Ayach	Lebanon	13:07
92	Ken Mova	Papua New Guinea	13:09
93	Selwyn Bonne	Seychelles	13:18
94	Djamched Rasulov	Tajikistan	13:20
95	Mehdi Chebli	Lebanon	13:22
96	Norbert Hariba	Seychelles	13:27
97	Ronny Marie	Seychelles	13:30
98	David Kanie	Papua New Guinea	13:49
99	Gumsie Taulobi	Papua New Guinea	13:50
100	David Rueben	Papua New Guinea	13:51
101	Anton Lopa	Papua New Guinea	14:05
102	Jeffrey Kaile	Papua New Guinea	15:12
—	Gairat Nigmatov	Tajikistan	DNF

==== Teams ====
Rank	Team	Points
1st place, gold medalist(s)	Kenya: John Kibowen / 1; Daniel Komen / 2; Paul Kosgei / 3; Benjamin Limo / 4; (John Kosgei) / (5); (Kipkirui Misoi) / (8)	10
2nd place, silver medalist(s)	Morocco: Brahim Boulami / 6; Hicham Bouaouiche / 9; Ali Ezzine / 12; Brahim Jabbour / 15; (Salah El Ghazi) / (16); (El Hassan Lahssini) / (18)	42
3rd place, bronze medalist(s)	Ethiopia: Maru Daba / 10; Mohamed Awol / 13; Tewodros Shiferaw / 17; Simretu Alemayehu / 20; (Abiyote Abate) / (40); (Mekonen Daba) / (51)	60
4	Spain: Isaac Viciosa / 11; Alberto García / 19; Manuel Pancorbo / 27; Anacleto Jiménez / 30; (Marco Rufo) / (53); (Reyes Estévez) / (64)	87
5	Portugal: Luis Jesús / 14; Hélder Ornelas / 22; João Junqueira / 23; José Ramos / 49; (Vítor Almeida) / (62); (Cândido Maia) / (71)	108
6	United States: Marc Davis / 7; Dan Browne / 21; Daniel Middleman / 28; Teddy Mitchell / 61; (Scott Strand) / (65); (Jason Bodnar) / (85)	117
7	Italy: Angelo Carosi / 24; Luciano Di Pardo / 31; Andrea Arlati / 34; Domenico D'Ambrosio / 44; (Massimo Pegoretti) / (45); (Giuseppe Maffei) / (56)	133
8	Algeria: Laïd Bessou / 25; Mourad Benslimani / 36; Abderahmane Djemadi / 38; Abdelmadjid Bouchamia / 60; (Kamel Boulahfane) / (69); (Miloud Abaoub) / (77)	159
9	United Kingdom: Phil Mowbray / 35; Rob Whalley / 37; Mike Openshaw / 42; Julian Moorhouse / 55; (Ian Gillespie) / (59); (Anthony Whiteman) / (70)	169
10	Zimbabwe: Kudakwashe Shoko / 32; Michael Ngaaseke / 39; Shingirai Badza / 58; Elijah Mutandiro / 83	212
11	France: Saïd Chébili / 47; Moussa Barkaoui / 50; Éric Dubus / 63; Stéphane Renaud / 66; (Frédéric Chocteau) / (81)	226
12	Brazil: João Leite / 29; Márcio da Silva / 48; Daniel das Neves / 74; Ricardo da Silva / 80	231
13	Argentina: Juan José Cruz / 46; Mariano Tarilo / 68; Zenon Patino / 79; Antonio Soliz / 84	277
14	Lebanon: Ali Awad / 75; Mestal El-Sahmarani / 90; Mahmoud Ayach / 91; Mehdi Chebli / 95	351
15	Seychelles: Simon Labiche / 89; Selwyn Bonne / 93; Norbert Hariba / 96; Ronny Marie / 97	375
16	Papua New Guinea: Ken Mova / 92; David Kanie / 98; Gumsie Taulobi / 99; David Rueben / 100; (Anton Lopa) / (101); (Jeffrey Kaile) / (102)	389

- Note: Athletes in parentheses did not score for the team result

== Participation ==
An unofficial count yields the participation of 103 athletes from 31 countries in the Men's short race. This is in agreement with the official numbers as published.

- Algeria (6)
- Argentina (4)
- Bahrain (1)
- Brazil (4)
- Canada (2)
- Estonia (2)
- Ethiopia (6)
- France (5)
- Greece (1)
- Hungary (1)
- Italy (6)
- Japan (1)
- Kazakhstan (1)
- Kenya (6)
- Lebanon (4)
- Mauritius (1)
- Morocco (6)
- Netherlands (1)
- New Zealand (1)
- Papua New Guinea (6)
- Poland (1)
- Portugal (6)
- Russia (1)
- Seychelles (4)
- Slovakia (1)
- Spain (6)
- Tajikistan (2)
- United Arab Emirates (1)
- United Kingdom (6)
- United States (6)
- Zimbabwe (4)

== See also ==
- 1998 IAAF World Cross Country Championships – Senior men's race
- 1998 IAAF World Cross Country Championships – Junior men's race
- 1998 IAAF World Cross Country Championships – Senior women's race
- 1998 IAAF World Cross Country Championships – Women's short race
- 1998 IAAF World Cross Country Championships – Junior women's race
