= 1999 World Championships in Athletics – Men's 3000 metres steeplechase =

These are the official results of the Men's 3000 metres steeplechase event at the 1999 IAAF World Championships in Seville, Spain. There were a total number of 40 participating athletes, with three qualifying heats and the final held on Monday 1999-08-23 at 21:10h.

== Final ==
RANK	FINAL	TIME
	Christopher Kosgei (KEN)	8:11.76
	Wilson Boit Kipketer (KEN)	8:12.09
	Ali Ezzine (MAR)	8:12.73
4.	Damian Kallabis (GER)	8:13.11
5.	Bernard Barmasai (KEN)	8:13.51
6.	Eliseo Martín (ESP)	8:16.09
7.	Paul Kosgei (KEN)	8:17.55
8.	Florin Ionescu (ROM)	8:18.17
9.	Günther Weidlinger (AUT)	8:19.02
10.	Giuseppe Maffei (ITA)	8:22.65
11.	Elarbi Khattabi (MAR)	8:24.62
12.	Bouabdallah Tahri (FRA)	8:25.59

== Heats ==
- Held on Saturday 1999-08-21

RANK	HEAT 1	TIME
1.	Paul Kosgei (KEN)	8:10.34
2.	Ali Ezzine (MAR)	8:10.45
3.	Damian Kallabis (GER)	8:10.56
4.	Günther Weidlinger (AUT)	8:10.83
5.	Bouabdallah Tahri (FRA)	8:12.96
6.	Florin Ionescu (ROM)	8:13.26 (NR)
7.	Robert Gary (USA)	8:25.15
8.	Christian Belz (SUI)	8:29.19
9.	Marco Antonio Cepedo (ESP)	8:29.75
10.	João Junquiera (POR)	8:32.12
11.	Rafał Wójcik (POL)	8:34.45
12.	Stathis Stati (CYP)	8:40.74
13.	Jassim Ali Mohamed Al-Baloushi (UAE)	8:51.73
14.	Elangovan Ganesan (SIN)	9:47.09

RANK	HEAT 2	TIME
1.	Bernard Barmasai (KEN)	8:16.50
2.	Wilson Boit Kipketer (KEN)	8:16.62
3.	Luís Miguel Martin (ESP)	8:17.75
4.	Laïd Bessou (ALG)	8:20.17
5.	Jim Svenøy (NOR)	8:23.05
6.	Mustapha Mellouk (MAR)	8:30.48
7.	Maru Daba (ETH)	8:31.09
8.	Christian Knoblich (GER)	8:33.03
9.	Vincent Le Dauphin (FRA)	8:44.60
10.	Francis O'Neill (USA)	8:49.81
11.	Geovanny Morejon (BOL)	9:01.30
12.	Akesso Tchaka (TOG)	9:44.41
	Simon Vroemen (NED)	DNF

RANK	HEAT 3	TIME
1.	Elarbi Khattabi (MAR)	8:14.22
2.	Christopher Kosgei (KEN)	8:15.04
3.	Giuseppe Maffei (ITA)	8:15.19
4.	Eliseo Martín (ESP)	8:16.56
5.	Khamis Abdullah Saifeldin (QAT)	8:18.58
6.	Michael Buchleitner (AUT)	8:20.04
7.	André Green (GER)	8:21.87
8.	Gael Pencreach (FRA)	8:21.89
9.	Nestor Nieves (VEN)	8:28.59
10.	Georgios Giannelis (GRE)	8:30.55
11.	Pascal Dobert (USA)	8:33.42
12.	Joël Bourgeois (CAN)	8:37.94
13.	Matteo Zafferani (SMR)	9:32.08
