= 2001 World Championships in Athletics – Men's 3000 metres steeplechase =

These are the official results of the Men's 3000 metres steeplechase event at the 2001 IAAF World Championships in Edmonton, Canada. There were a total number of 25 participating athletes, with two qualifying heats and the final held on Wednesday 2001-08-08 at 20:00h.

== Medalists ==
Gold	Reuben Kosgei; Kenya (KEN)
Silver	Ali Ezzine; Morocco (MAR)
Bronze	Bernard Barmasai; Kenya (KEN)

== Records ==
Standing records prior to the 2001 World Athletics Championships
World Record	Bernard Barmasai (KEN)	7:55.72	August 24, 1997	Cologne, Germany
Event Record	Moses Kiptanui (KEN)	8:04.16	August 11, 1995	Gothenburg, Sweden
Season Best	Wilson Boit Kipketer (KEN)	8:01.73	July 20, 2001	Monte Carlo, Monaco

== Final ==
RANK	FINAL	TIME
	Reuben Kosgei (KEN)	8:15.16
	Ali Ezzine (MAR)	8:16.21
	Bernard Barmasai (KEN)	8:16.59
4.	Luis Miguel Martín (ESP)	8:18.87
5.	Bouabdallah Tahri (FRA)	8:19.56
6.	Antonio David Jiménez (ESP)	8:19.82
7.	Khamis Abdullah Saifeldin (QAT)	8:20.01
8.	Raymond Yator (KEN)	8:20.87
9.	Ralf Assmus (GER)	8:21.73
10.	Brahim Boulami (MAR)	8:21.95
11.	Tim Broe (USA)	8:23.07
12.	Eliseo Martín (ESP)	8:27.78
13.	Christian Belz (SUI)	8:31.43
14.	Joël Bourgeois (CAN)	8:36.38
15.	Gaël Pencreach (FRA)	8:41.51

== Heats ==
Held on Monday 2001-08-06

RANK	HEAT 1	TIME
1.	Reuben Kosgei (KEN)	8:21.96
2.	Brahim Boulami (MAR)	8:21.98
3.	Luis Miguel Martín (ESP)	8:25.09
4.	Eliseo Martín (ESP)	8:26.18
5.	Ali Ezzine (MAR)	8:26.86
6.	Joël Bourgeois (CAN)	8:26.92
7.	Tim Broe (USA)	8:27.26
8.	Gaël Pencreach (FRA)	8:28.54
9.	Frédéric Denis (FRA)	8:41.66
10.	Yoshitaka Iwamizu (JPN)	8:45.25
11.	Tom Chorny (USA)	8:51.74
—	Simon Vroemen (NED)	DNF

RANK	HEAT 2	TIME
1.	Antonio David Jiménez (ESP)	8:25.37
2.	Raymond Yator (KEN)	8:25.45
3.	Bernard Barmasai (KEN)	8:25.65
4.	Khamis Abdullah Saifeldin (QAT)	8:25.83
5.	Ralf Assmus (GER)	8:29.52
6.	Bouabdallah Tahri (FRA)	8:29.71
7.	Christian Belz (SUI)	8:31.57
8.	Elarbi Khattabi (MAR)	8:32.70
9.	Laïd Bessou (ALG)	8:33.40
10.	Jim Svenøy (NOR)	8:35.71
11.	Anthony Famiglietti (USA)	8:44.54
12.	José Salvador Miranda (MEX)	8:49.47
13.	Madan Raj Giri (NEP)	9:34.97
