= Kenya at the 2000 Summer Olympics =

- IOC code: KEN
- NOC: National Olympic Committee of Kenya
- Website: teamkenya.or.ke

in Sydney
- Competitors: 56 in 6 sports
- Flag bearer: Kennedy Ochieng
- Medals Ranked 29th: Gold 2 Silver 3 Bronze 2 Total 7

Summer Olympics appearances (overview)
- 1956; 1960; 1964; 1968; 1972; 1976–1980; 1984; 1988; 1992; 1996; 2000; 2004; 2008; 2012; 2016; 2020; 2024; 2028

Kenya competed at the 2000 Summer Olympics in Sydney, Australia.

== Medalists ==
Medal	Name	Sport	Event	Date
Gold	Reuben Kosgei	Athletics	Men's 3000 m steeplechase	29 September
Gold	Noah Ngeny	Athletics	Men's 1500 m	29 September
Silver	Paul Tergat	Athletics	Men's 10,000 m	25 September
Silver	Wilson Boit Kipketer	Athletics	Men's 3000 m steeplechase	29 September
Silver	Erick Wainaina	Athletics	Men's marathon	1 October
Bronze	Joyce Chepchumba	Athletics	Women's marathon	24 September
Bronze	Bernard Lagat	Athletics	Men's 1500 m	29 September

== Competitors ==
The following is the list of number of competitors in the Games.

Sport	Men	Women	Total
Archery	1	0	1
Athletics	27	9	36
Boxing	4	–	4
Cycling	1	0	1
Swimming	1	1	2
Volleyball	0	12	12
Total	34	22	56

== Archery ==
Athlete	Event	Ranking round		Round of 64	Round of 32	Round of 16	Quarterfinals	Semifinals	Final / BM	
Athlete	Event	Score	Seed	Opposition Score	Opposition Score	Opposition Score	Opposition Score	Opposition Score	Opposition Score	Rank
Dominic Rebelo	Men's individual	500	63	Oh (KOR); L 132–168	Did not advance					

== Athletics ==
Key

- Note–Ranks given for track events are within the athlete's heat only
- Q = Qualified for the next round
- q = Qualified for the next round as a fastest loser or, in field events, by position without achieving the qualifying target
- NR = National record
- N/A = Round not applicable for the event
- Bye = Athlete not required to compete in round

Men
Track and road events

Athletes	Events	Heat Round 1		Heat Round 2		Semifinal		Final	
Athletes	Events	Time	Rank	Time	Rank	Time	Rank	Time	Rank
Ezra Sambu	200 metres	21.23	52	Did not advance					
David Kirui	400 metres	45.69	18 Q	46.00	29	Did not advance			
Kennedy Ochieng	400 metres	Did not finish		Did not advance					
Japheth Kimutai	800 metres	1:45.60	3 Q	—N/a		1:45.64	12	Did not advance	
Joseph Mutua	800 metres	1:47.86	32	—N/a		Did not advance			
William Yiampoy	800 metres	1:47.35	17 q	—N/a		1:45.88	13	Did not advance	
Bernard Lagat	1500 metres	3:40.42	20 Q	—N/a		3:37.84	2 Q	3:32.44	3rd place, bronze medalist(s)
Noah Ngeny	1500 metres	3:38.03	1 Q	—N/a		3:39.29	8 Q	3:32.07 OR	1st place, gold medalist(s)
William Chirchir	1500 metres	3:40.22	25	—N/a		Did not advance			
David Chelule	5000 metres	13:29.98	13 Q	—N/a				13:37.13	5
Julius Gitahi	5000 metres	13:23.12	5 Q	—N/a				13:39.11	9
Richard Limo	5000 metres	13:23.17	6 Q	—N/a				13:39.43	10
Patrick Ivuti	10,000 metres	27:50.10	10 Q	—N/a				27:20.44	4
John Korir	10,000 metres	27:50.19	11 Q	—N/a				27:24.75	5
Paul Tergat	10,000 metres	27:44.07	2 Q	—N/a				27:18.29	2nd place, silver medalist(s)
Kenneth Cheruiyot	Marathon	—N/a						Did not finish	
Elijah Lagat	Marathon	—N/a						Did not finish	
Eric Wainaina	Marathon	—N/a						2:10:31	2nd place, silver medalist(s)
Erick Keter	400 metres hurdles	50.06	18 q	—N/a		51.25	24	Did not advance	
Hillary Maritim	400 metres hurdles	51.04	39	—N/a		Did not advance			
Bernard Barmasai	3000 metres steeplechase	8:23.08	4 Q	—N/a				8:22.23	4
Wilson Boit Kipketer	3000 metres steeplechase	8:22.07	2 Q	—N/a				8:21.77	2nd place, silver medalist(s)
Reuben Kosgei	3000 metres steeplechase	8:23.17	5 Q	—N/a				8:21.43	1st place, gold medalist(s)
Ezra Sambu; Samson Yego; Joseph Mutua; Julius Chepkwony	4 × 400 metres relay	3:06.77	16 Q	—N/a		Disqualified		Did not advance	
David Kimutai	20 kilometres walk	—N/a						1:28:45	39
Julius Sawe	20 kilometres walk	—N/a						1:30:55	42

Women
Track and road events

Athletes	Events	Heat Round 1		Heat Round 2		Semifinal		Final	
Athletes	Events	Time	Rank	Time	Rank	Time	Rank	Time	Rank
Naomi Mugo	1500 metres	4:13.18	31	—N/a		Did not advance			
Lydia Cheromei	5000 metres	15:09.32	6 Q	—N/a				14:47.35	6
Rose Cheruiyot	5000 metres	15:13.18	12 Q	—N/a				14:58.07	11
Vivian Cheruiyot	5000 metres	15:11.11	10 q	—N/a				15:33.66	14
Sally Barsosio	10,000 metres	32:34.07	9 Q	—N/a				31:57.41	17
Tegla Loroupe	10,000 metres	32:06.41	2 Q	—N/a				30:37.26	5
Alice Timbilil	10,000 metres	32:34.15	10 Q	—N/a				31:50.22	14
Joyce Chepchumba	Marathon	—N/a						2:24:45	3rd place, bronze medalist(s)
Tegla Loroupe	Marathon	—N/a						2:29:45	13
Esther Wanjiru	Marathon	—N/a						2:26:17	4

== Boxing ==
Athlete	Event	Round of 32	Round of 16	Quarterfinals	Semifinals	Final	
Athlete	Event	Opposition Result	Opposition Result	Opposition Result	Opposition Result	Opposition Result	Rank
Suleiman Bilali	Light flyweight	Bye	Matyhila (RSA); W RSC–R1	Lozano (ESP); L 10–11	Did not advance		
Fred Kinuthia	Light welterweight	Neequaye (GHA); L 2–14	Did not advance				
Peter Ngumi	Middleweight	Alakbarov (AZE); L 3–12	Did not advance				
George Odindo	Light heavyweight	Katulevsky (KGZ); L 2–11	Did not advance				

== Cycling ==
=== Mountain biking ===
Athlete	Event	Time	Rank
Ken Muhindi	Men's cross-country	–4 laps	39

== Swimming ==
=== Men ===
Athlete	Event	Heat		Semifinal		Final	
Athlete	Event	Time	Rank	Time	Rank	Time	Rank
Kim Jin-woo	100m butterfly	59.55	60	Did not advance			

=== Women ===
Athlete	Event	Heat		Semifinal		Final	
Athlete	Event	Time	Rank	Time	Rank	Time	Rank
Maria Awori	100m freestyle	1:06.23	49	Did not advance			

== Volleyball ==
=== Indoor ===
Summary

Team	Event	Group stage						Quarterfinal	Semifinal	Final / BM	
Team	Event	Opposition Score	Opposition Score	Opposition Score	Opposition Score	Opposition Score	Rank	Opposition Score	Opposition Score	Opposition Score	Rank
Kenya women	Women's tournament	Brazil; L 0–3	United States; L 0–3	Australia; L 1–3	China; L 0–3	Croatia; L 1–3	6	Did not advance			

==== Women ====
- Team Roster
- Head coach: Sadatoshi Sugawara

#	Name	Date of Birth	Height	Weight	Spike	Block
—	Mary Ayuma	23.10.1966	168	71
—	Violet Barasa	21.06.1975	178	65
—	Ednah Chepngeno	15.07.1977	178	72
—	Margaret Indakala	24.08.1962	178	75
—	Jackline Makokha	15.11.1974	175	63
—	Roselidah Mangala	23.12.1973	180	70
—	Gladys Nasikanda	25.07.1978	181	75
—	Dorcas Ndasaba	31.03.1971	174	72
—	Judith Serenge	21.01.1971	162	62
—	Nancy Waswa	28.12.1971	174	60
—	Doris Wefwafwa	24.12.1966	170	72
—	Emily Wesutila	08.03.1973	153	60

Group play

Pos	Team	Pld	W	L	Pts	SW	SL	SR	SPW	SPL	SPR	Qualification
1	Brazil	5	5	0	10	15	1	15.000	395	272	1.452	Quarterfinals
2	United States	5	4	1	9	13	4	3.250	392	306	1.281	Quarterfinals
3	Croatia	5	3	2	8	9	9	1.000	411	389	1.057	Quarterfinals
4	China	5	2	3	7	8	9	0.889	371	365	1.016	Quarterfinals
5	Australia	5	1	4	6	4	13	0.308	303	408	0.743	
6	Kenya	5	0	5	5	2	15	0.133	280	412	0.680	

Date	Venue		Score		Set 1	Set 2	Set 3	Set 4	Set 5	Total	
16 Sep	12:30	Brazil	3–0	Kenya	25–8	25–11	25–13			75–32	Report
18 Sep	14:30	United States	3–0	Kenya	25–16	25–6	25–16			75–38	Report
20 Sep	14:30	Kenya	1–3	Australia	25–16	20–25	15–25	26–28		86–94	Report
22 Sep	10:00	China	3–0	Kenya	25–15	25–14	25–18			75–47	Report
24 Sep	10:00	Kenya	1–3	Croatia	25–18	16–25	18–25	18–25		77–93	Report
