= 1998 World Junior Championships in Athletics – Men's 3000 metres steeplechase =

The men's 3000 metres steeplechase event at the 1998 World Junior Championships in Athletics was held in Annecy, France, at Parc des Sports on 30 July and 1 August.

== Medalists ==
Gold	Reuben Kosgei; Kenya
Silver	Abraham Cherono; Kenya
Bronze	Mustapha Mellouk; Morocco

== Results ==
=== Final ===
1 August

Rank	Name	Nationality	Time	Notes
1st place, gold medalist(s)	Reuben Kosgei	Kenya	8:23.76	
2nd place, silver medalist(s)	Abraham Cherono	Kenya	8:32.24	
3rd place, bronze medalist(s)	Mustapha Mellouk	Morocco	8:34.91	
4	Maru Daba	Ethiopia	8:35.51	
5	Chris Dugan	United States	8:38.66	
6	Tuomo Lehtinen	Finland	8:41.05	
7	Ian Connor	United States	8:42.19	
8	Mustafa Mohamed	Sweden	8:42.55	
9	Gebremariam Gebremedhin	Ethiopia	8:43.47	
10	Henrik Skoog	Sweden	8:44.30	
11	Martin Dent	Australia	8:46.66	
12	Filmon Ghirmai	Germany	8:53.94	

=== Heats ===
30 July

==== Heat 1 ====
Rank	Name	Nationality	Time	Notes
1	Abraham Cherono	Kenya	8:47.27	Q
2	Ian Connor	United States	8:47.34	Q
3	Henrik Skoog	Sweden	8:55.53	Q
4	Eric Segura	Spain	9:01.89	
5	Chris Thompson	United Kingdom	9:07.37	
6	Mikael Talasjoki	Finland	9:09.77	
7	Kjetil Ramstad	Norway	9:10.64	
8	Fethi Meftah	Algeria	9:10.67	
9	Jan Bochedi	South Africa	9:23.21	
10	Norbert Csorba	Hungary	9:33.17	
11	Vaughan Craddock	New Zealand	9:35.83	
12	Marcos Silva	Uruguay	9:53.29	

==== Heat 2 ====
Rank	Name	Nationality	Time	Notes
1	Maru Daba	Ethiopia	8:42.79	Q
2	Reuben Kosgei	Kenya	8:43.07	Q
3	Mustafa Mohamed	Sweden	8:46.27	Q
4	Tuomo Lehtinen	Finland	8:49.49	q
5	Adrián Peña	Spain	8:55.82	
6	Lambert Ndayikeza	Burundi	9:06.16	
7	Iain Murdoch	United Kingdom	9:07.09	
8	Kevin Paulsen	France	9:13.68	
9	Juan Carlos de Bastos	Argentina	9:17.96	
10	Georg Mlynek	Austria	9:22.32	
11	Sofiane Tayane	Algeria	9:44.80	
12	Oscar Meza	Paraguay	9:46.34	
13	Máté Németh	Hungary	10:01.73	

==== Heat 3 ====
Rank	Name	Nationality	Time	Notes
1	Mustapha Mellouk	Morocco	8:42.94	Q
2	Chris Dugan	United States	8:43.11	Q
3	Filmon Ghirmai	Germany	8:43.15	Q
4	Gebremariam Gebremedhin	Ethiopia	8:43.16	q
5	Martin Dent	Australia	8:48.77	q
6	Jassim Mohamed	United Arab Emirates	8:56.75	
7	Pasteur Nyabenda	Burundi	9:05.04	
8	Andrey Kuznetsov	Russia	9:07.30	
9	Xing Zhonglin	China	9:08.05	
10	Laurent Slaviero	France	9:26.46	
11	Sakir Kaya	Turkey	9:45.53	
	Mahmoud Ibrahim Ali	Qatar	DNF	

== Participation ==
According to an unofficial count, 37 athletes from 26 countries participated in the event.

- Algeria (2)
- Argentina (1)
- Australia (1)
- Austria (1)
- Burundi (2)
- China (1)
- Ethiopia (2)
- Finland (2)
- France (2)
- Germany (1)
- Hungary (2)
- Kenya (2)
- Morocco (1)
- New Zealand (1)
- Norway (1)
- Paraguay (1)
- Qatar (1)
- Russia (1)
- South Africa (1)
- Spain (2)
- Sweden (2)
- Turkey (1)
- United Arab Emirates (1)
- United Kingdom (2)
- United States (2)
- Uruguay (1)
