= 2002 African Championships in Athletics – Men's 3000 metres steeplechase =

The men's 3000 metres steeplechase event at the 2002 African Championships in Athletics was held in Radès, Tunisia on August 8.

== Results ==
Rank	Name	Nationality	Time	Notes
1st place, gold medalist(s)	Brahim Boulami	Morocco	8:19.51	
2nd place, silver medalist(s)	Wilson Boit Kipketer	Kenya	8:20.92	
3rd place, bronze medalist(s)	Stephen Cherono	Kenya	8:23.85	
4	Ezekiel Kemboi	Kenya	8:27.14	
5	Lotfi Turki	Tunisia	8:28.07	
6	Elarbi Khattabi	Morocco	8:32.39	
7	Abdelhakim Maazouz	Algeria	8:33.49	
8	Luleseged Wale	Ethiopia	8:40.33	
9	Gulte Bekele	Ethiopia	8:47.96	
	Zouhair Ouerdi	Morocco	DNF	
