= 1998 IAAF World Cross Country Championships =

Coordinates: 31°36′58″N 8°00′37″W

- Organisers: IAAF
- Edition: 26th
- Date: March 21/22
- Host city: Marrakesh, Morocco
- Venue: Menara district
- Events: 6
- Distances: 12 km – Senior men 4 km – Men's short 8 km – Junior men 8 km – Senior women 4 km – Women's short 6 km – Junior women
- Participation: 707 athletes from 66 nations

The 1998 IAAF World Cross Country Championships took place on March 21/22, 1998. The races were held at the Menara district in Marrakesh, Morocco. Reports of the event were given in The New York Times, in the Herald, and for the IAAF.

Complete results for senior men, for senior men's teams, for men's short race, for men's short race teams, for junior men, for junior men's teams, senior women, for senior women's teams, for women's short race, for women's short race teams, for junior women, for junior women's teams, medallists, and the results of British athletes who took part were published.

== Medallists ==
Event	Gold		Silver		Bronze	
Individual
Senior men (12 km)	Paul Tergat; Kenya	34:01	Paul Koech; Kenya	34:06	Assefa Mezegebu; Ethiopia	34:28
Men's short (4 km)	John Kibowen; Kenya	10:43	Daniel Komen; Kenya	10:46	Paul Kosgei; Kenya	10:50
Junior men (8 km)	Million Wolde; Ethiopia	22:47	Richard Limo; Kenya	22:50	Haylu Mekonnen; Ethiopia	22:51
Senior women (8 km)	Sonia O'Sullivan; Ireland	25:39	Paula Radcliffe; United Kingdom	25:42	Gete Wami; Ethiopia	25:49
Women's short (4 km)	Sonia O'Sullivan; Ireland	12:20	Zahra Ouaziz; Morocco	12:34	Kutre Dulecha; Ethiopia	12:37
Junior women (6 km)	Yimenashu Taye; Ethiopia	19:32	Jeruto Kiptum; Kenya	19:34	Worknesh Kidane; Ethiopia	19:34
Team
Senior men	Kenya	12	Ethiopia	57	Morocco	60
Men's short	Kenya	10	Morocco	42	Ethiopia	60
Junior men	Ethiopia	16	Kenya	20	Morocco	66
Senior women	Kenya	30	Ethiopia	37	United Kingdom	74
Women's short	Morocco	57	Ethiopia	58	United States	68
Junior women	Ethiopia	16	Kenya	20	Japan	68

== Race results ==
=== Senior men's race (12 km) ===
Individual race
Rank	Athlete	Country	Time
1st place, gold medalist(s)	Paul Tergat	Kenya	34:01
2nd place, silver medalist(s)	Paul Koech	Kenya	34:06
3rd place, bronze medalist(s)	Assefa Mezegebu	Ethiopia	34:28
4	Tom Nyariki	Kenya	34:37
5	Wilson Boit Kipketer	Kenya	34:38
6	Christopher Kelong	Kenya	34:41
7	Ismael Kirui	Kenya	34:41
8	Mohammed Mourhit	Belgium	34:44
9	Domingos Castro	Portugal	34:46
10	Fabián Roncero	Spain	34:50
11	Elarbi Khattabi	Morocco	34:54
12	Paulo Guerra	Portugal	34:59
Full results

Teams
Rank	Team	Points
1st place, gold medalist(s)	Kenya: Paul Tergat / 1; Paul Koech / 2; Tom Nyariki / 4; Wilson Boit Kipketer / 5; (Christopher Kelong) / (6); (Ismael Kirui) / (7)	12
2nd place, silver medalist(s)	Ethiopia: Assefa Mezegebu / 3; Habte Jifar / 13; Tesfaye Tola / 20; Ayele Mezegebu / 21; (Abraham Assefa) / (24); (Mamo Kejela) / (91)	57
3rd place, bronze medalist(s)	Morocco: Elarbi Khattabi / 11; Lahcen Benyoussef / 14; Brahim Lahlafi / 17; Khaled Boulami / 18; (Abdelilah El Manaia) / (53); (Smail Sghir) / (DNF)	60
4	Portugal	74
5	Spain	94
6	Tanzania	156
7	Algeria	193
8	United States	194
Full results

- Note: Athletes in parentheses did not score for the team result

=== Men's short race (4 km) ===
Individual race
Rank	Athlete	Country	Time
1st place, gold medalist(s)	John Kibowen	Kenya	10:43
2nd place, silver medalist(s)	Daniel Komen	Kenya	10:46
3rd place, bronze medalist(s)	Paul Kosgei	Kenya	10:50
4	Benjamin Limo	Kenya	10:59
5	John Kosgei	Kenya	11:04
6	Brahim Boulami	Morocco	11:06
7	Marc Davis	United States	11:08
8	Kipkurui Misoi	Kenya	11:10
9	Hicham Bouaouiche	Morocco	11:11
10	Maru Daba	Ethiopia	11:11
11	Isaac Viciosa	Spain	11:13
12	Ali Ezzine	Morocco	11:14
Full results

Teams
Rank	Team	Points
1st place, gold medalist(s)	Kenya: John Kibowen / 1; Daniel Komen / 2; Paul Kosgei / 3; Benjamin Limo / 4; (John Kosgei) / (5); (Kipkurui Misoi) / (8)	10
2nd place, silver medalist(s)	Morocco: Brahim Boulami / 6; Hicham Bouaouiche / 9; Ali Ezzine / 12; Brahim Jabbour / 15; (Salah El Ghazi) / (16); (El Hassan Lahssini) / (18)	42
3rd place, bronze medalist(s)	Ethiopia: Maru Daba / 10; Mohamed Awol / 13; Tewodros Shiferaw / 17; Simretu Alemayehu / 20; (Abiyote Abate) / (40); (Mekonen Daba) / (51)	60
4	Spain	87
5	Portugal	108
6	United States	117
7	Italy	133
8	Algeria	159
Full results

- Note: Athletes in parentheses did not score for the team result

=== Junior men's race (8 km) ===
Individual race
Rank	Athlete	Country	Time
1st place, gold medalist(s)	Million Wolde	Ethiopia	22:47
2nd place, silver medalist(s)	Richard Limo	Kenya	22:50
3rd place, bronze medalist(s)	Haylu Mekonnen	Ethiopia	22:51
4	Yibeltal Admassu	Ethiopia	22:53
5	Douglas Mumanyi	Kenya	22:54
6	Reuben Kamzee	Kenya	22:55
7	Titus Kipkemboi	Kenya	23:02
8	Alene Emere	Ethiopia	23:06
9	Yitbarek Eshetu	Ethiopia	23:14
10	Adil Kaouch	Morocco	23:17
11	Abraham Cherono	Kenya	23:25
12	Geofrey Naibei	Kenya	23:32
Full results

Teams
Rank	Team	Points
1st place, gold medalist(s)	Ethiopia: Million Wolde / 1; Haylu Mekonnen / 3; Yibeltal Admassu / 4; Alene Emere / 8; (Yitbarek Eshetu) / (9); (Hailemariam Tegafaw) / (14)	16
2nd place, silver medalist(s)	Kenya: Richard Limo / 2; Douglas Mumanyi / 5; Reuben Kamzee / 6; Titus Kipkemboi / 7; (Abraham Cherono) / (11); (Geofrey Naibei) / (12)	20
3rd place, bronze medalist(s)	Morocco: Adil Kaouch / 10; Mustapha Mellouk / 13; Driss Benismail / 20; Hicham Lamalem / 23; (Saïd Berrioui) / (84)	66^{†}
4	Japan	100
5	South Africa	102
6	Uganda	104
7	United States	152
8	Algeria	163
Full results

- Note: Athletes in parentheses did not score for the team result

^{†}: Ahmed Baday of Morocco was the original 18th-place finisher in 24:18 min, but was disqualified for age falsification.

=== Senior women's race (8 km) ===
Individual race
Rank	Athlete	Country	Time
1st place, gold medalist(s)	Sonia O'Sullivan	Ireland	25:39
2nd place, silver medalist(s)	Paula Radcliffe	United Kingdom	25:42
3rd place, bronze medalist(s)	Gete Wami	Ethiopia	25:49
4	Merima Denboba	Ethiopia	25:56
5	Jackline Maranga	Kenya	25:56
6	Julia Vaquero	Spain	26:06
7	Jane Omoro	Kenya	26:07
8	Leah Malot	Kenya	26:16
9	Ayelech Worku	Ethiopia	26:17
10	Sally Barsosio	Kenya	26:27
11	Naomi Mugo	Kenya	26:33
12	Susan Chepkemei	Kenya	26:35
Full results

Teams
Rank	Team	Points
1st place, gold medalist(s)	Kenya: Jackline Maranga / 5; Jane Omoro / 7; Leah Malot / 8; Sally Barsosio / 10; (Naomi Mugo) / (11); (Susan Chepkemei) / (12)	30
2nd place, silver medalist(s)	Ethiopia: Gete Wami / 3; Merima Denboba / 4; Ayelech Worku / 9; Getenesh Urge / 21; (Asha Gigi) / (36); (Leila Aman) / (39)	37
3rd place, bronze medalist(s)	United Kingdom: Paula Radcliffe / 2; Hayley Haining / 13; Vikki McPherson / 25; Liz Talbot / 34; (Lucy Wright) / (53); (Angela Joiner) / (59)	74
4	Spain	93
5	United States	118
6	Japan	124
7	Australia	155
8	France	159
Full results

- Note: Athletes in parentheses did not score for the team result

=== Women's short race (4 km) ===
Individual race
Rank	Athlete	Country	Time
1st place, gold medalist(s)	Sonia O'Sullivan	Ireland	12:20
2nd place, silver medalist(s)	Zahra Ouaziz	Morocco	12:34
3rd place, bronze medalist(s)	Kutre Dulecha	Ethiopia	12:37
4	Anita Weyermann	Switzerland	12:45
5	Restituta Joseph	Tanzania	12:46
6	Beatrice Omwanza	Kenya	12:47
7	Rodica Nagel	France	12:48
8	Elva Dryer	United States	12:51
9	Amy Rudolph	United States	12:51
10	Samukeliso Moyo	Zimbabwe	12:51
11	Genet Gebregiorgis	Ethiopia	12:52
12	Grethe Koens	Netherlands	12:56
Full results

Teams
Rank	Team	Points
1st place, gold medalist(s)	Morocco: Zahra Ouaziz / 2; Zhor El Kamch / 13; Saliha Khaldoun / 18; Seloua Ouaziz / 24; (Samra Raif) / (29); (Hasna Benhassi) / (73)	57
2nd place, silver medalist(s)	Ethiopia: Kutre Dulecha / 3; Genet Gebregiorgis / 11; Alemitu Bekele / 17; Yihunelesh Bekele / 27; (Etaferahu Yimer) / (32); (Elsabet Truneh) / (50)	58
3rd place, bronze medalist(s)	United States: Elva Dryer / 8; Amy Rudolph / 9; Molly Watcke / 25; Kathy Franey / 26; (Karen Candaele) / (33); (Fran ten Bensel) / (66)	68
4	Kenya	98
5	Romania	104
6	Spain	113
7	Italy	192
8	Zimbabwe	200
Full results

- Note: Athletes in parentheses did not score for the team result

=== Junior women's race (6 km) ===
Individual race
Rank	Athlete	Country	Time
1st place, gold medalist(s)	Yimenashu Taye	Ethiopia	19:32
2nd place, silver medalist(s)	Jeruto Kiptum	Kenya	19:34
3rd place, bronze medalist(s)	Worknesh Kidane	Ethiopia	19:34
4	Alemgena Bezabeh	Ethiopia	19:46
5	Vivian Cheruiyot	Kenya	19:47
6	Margaret Chepkemboi	Kenya	19:48
7	Agnes Kiprop	Kenya	19:57
8	Merima Hashim	Ethiopia	19:59
9	Emiko Kojima	Japan	20:02
10	Émilie Mondor	Canada	20:16
11	Prisca Ngetich	Kenya	20:16
12	René Kalmer	South Africa	20:17
Full results

Teams
Rank	Team	Points
1st place, gold medalist(s)	Ethiopia: Yimenashu Taye / 1; Worknesh Kidane / 3; Alemgena Bezabeh / 4; Merima Hashim / 8; (Hareg Sidelil) / (16); (Tereza Yohanes) / (17)	16
2nd place, silver medalist(s)	Kenya: Jeruto Kiptum / 2; Vivian Cheruiyot / 5; Margaret Chepkemboi / 6; Agnes Kiprop / 7; (Prisca Ngetich) / (11); (Salome Boiyo) / (18)	20
3rd place, bronze medalist(s)	Japan: Emiko Kojima / 9; Yoshiko Fujinaga / 14; Risa Tanaka / 19; Miho Nakashima / 24; (Chioko Sakaue) / (29); (Kazuko Kanno) / (48)	66
4	South Africa	98^{†}
5	Morocco	114^{†}
6	Finland	165
7	United States	191
8	Algeria	200
Full results

- Note: Athletes in parentheses did not score for the team result

^{†}: Nadia Ejjafini of Morocco was the original 18th-place finisher in 20:43 min, but was disqualified for age falsification affecting the team scores.

== Medal table (unofficial) ==
* Host nation (Morocco)

Rank	Nation	Gold	Silver	Bronze	Total
1	Kenya	5	6	1	12
2	Ethiopia	4	3	6	13
3	Ireland	2	0	0	2
4	Morocco*	1	2	2	5
5	Great Britain	0	1	1	2
6	Japan	0	0	1	1
6	United States	0	0	1	1
Totals (7 entries)		12	12	12	36

- Note: Totals include both individual and team medals, with medals in the team competition counting as one medal.

== Participation ==
An unofficial count yields the participation of 707 athletes from 66 countries. This is in agreement with the official numbers as published.

- Algeria (30)
- Andorra (1)
- Argentina (7)
- Armenia (1)
- Australia (15)
- Bahrain (1)
- Belarus (2)
- Belgium (4)
- Botswana (6)
- Brazil (22)
- Burundi (1)
- Canada (28)
- Central African Republic (1)
- Colombia (12)
- Costa Rica (2)
- Côte d'Ivoire (4)
- Croatia (4)
- Ecuador (4)
- Egypt (6)
- Estonia (7)
- Ethiopia (36)
- Finland (12)
- France (31)
- Gabon (6)
- Germany (7)
- Greece (2)
- Hong Kong (1)
- Hungary (7)
- Ireland (12)
- Italy (29)
- Japan (21)
- Kazakhstan (5)
- Kenya (36)
- Lebanon (8)
- Libya (4)
- Mauritius (3)
- Mexico (9)
- Morocco (36)
- Namibia (6)
- Netherlands (8)
- New Zealand (5)
- Palestine (2)
- Papua New Guinea (7)
- Poland (3)
- Portugal (21)
- Romania (12)
- Russia (6)
- Rwanda (12)
- Seychelles (4)
- Slovakia (1)
- South Africa (22)
- Spain (36)
- Sweden (1)
- Switzerland (3)
- Tajikistan (3)
- Tanzania (7)
- Tunisia (4)
- Turkey (9)
- Turkmenistan (8)
- Uganda (5)
- Ukraine (4)
- United Arab Emirates (2)
- United Kingdom (35)
- United States (35)
- Yugoslavia (4)
- Zimbabwe (19)

== See also ==
- 1998 IAAF World Cross Country Championships – Senior men's race
- 1998 IAAF World Cross Country Championships – Men's short race
- 1998 IAAF World Cross Country Championships – Junior men's race
- 1998 IAAF World Cross Country Championships – Senior women's race
- 1998 IAAF World Cross Country Championships – Women's short race
- 1998 IAAF World Cross Country Championships – Junior women's race
- 1998 in athletics (track and field)
