= Joan Nesbit =

American long-distance runner

Medal record

Women's athletics

Representing the United States

IAAF World Indoor Championships
Bronze medal – third place	1995 Barcelona	3000 m

Joan Nesbit Mabe (born January 20, 1962) is an American former long-distance runner who competed mainly in distances from 3000 meters to 10,000 meters. Her highest honour was a bronze medal in the 3000 m at the 1995 IAAF World Indoor Championships. She represented her country at the 1996 Atlanta Olympics and appeared four times at the IAAF World Cross Country Championships.

Nesbit was a two-time national champion, having been the winner of the USA Cross Country Championships in 1995 and the 3000 m at the USA Indoor Track and Field Championships. She competed collegiately for the North Carolina Tar Heels, taking three All-American honours in NCAA competition. She also had wins in road races, including the Peachtree Road Race and Cherry Blossom Ten Mile Run.

She continued running into her forties and set a world masters record in the indoor mile for the 45+ age category. Nesbit is now the head men's and women's varsity cross country coach at Chapel Hill High School.

== Career ==
=== Early life ===
Born in Fort Wayne, Indiana, Nesbit attended East Mecklenburg High School in Charlotte, North Carolina, where she graduated in 1980, before studying American literature up to masters level at the University of North Carolina at Chapel Hill. She had taken up distance running towards the end of high school and winning the 1600 meter NCHSAA state championship her senior year led to a college sports scholarship.

=== College ===
She ran collegiately for the North Carolina Tar Heels. In her first two years, she failed to make it out of the heats at the NCAA Outdoor and Indoor meets. At the 1982 NCAA Division I Women's Cross Country Championship she ranked 37th then improved to 15th place the following year.

Her two best NCAA placings came in her final year of student competition in 1984, coming seventh in the 3000 meters at the NCAA Indoor Championships and fourth over 10,000 meters at the NCAA Outdoor Championships. She left the University of North Carolina with three NCAA All-American honours.

=== Professional ===
It was in cross country running that Nesbit first made her impact in national level competition and she ran at the USA Cross Country Championships while in college. She place 32nd in 1982 then 38th in 1983, but quickly improved to 11th place at the 1984 meet. At the 1985 USA Indoor Track and Field Championships she finished eighth in the two miles race and came 14th in cross country late that year. She struggled with the transition out of college and are contemplating retirement from the sport she began working with a new coach, Harry Wilson, upon the advice of former college mate Jim Cooper.

She also began taking part in road running events and won on her debut at the Falmouth Road Race in 1984. Other road performances around this time included wins at the Maggie Valley Moonlight in 1989 and 1992, and the Buffalo 4-mile Chase and Crazy 8's Road Race in 1992.

Nesbit managed only eleventh in the 3000 m at the USA Outdoor Track and Field Championships in 1987, but was much higher placed the following year, taking the runner-up spot behind Lynn Jennings. At the separately held United States Olympic Trials she was back down the order, ending 17th in the 10,000 meters. This was last place by some distance, but she persevered until the finish, driven on by memories of her late father. She failed to break into the top of the American elite that decade, finishing 13th at the 1988 USA Cross Country and tenth at the 1989 USA Outdoor 3000 m. A plantar fasciitis injury interrupted her career in 1989 to 1991, but she reflected that she had been doing too much training and welcomed the change.

=== National and international success ===
Nesbit returned to action 1992 and was an improved runner. She was fifth in the 3000 m at the USA Indoor Championships and then placed fourth over that distance at the 1992 United States Olympic Trials. Although she missed the Olympic spot, this performance led to her first international selection and she finished fourth at the 1992 IAAF World Cup in Havana. She missed the 1993 season but returned to take her first national podium in the 3000 m at the 1994 USA Outdoor Track and Field Championships in third. She achieved that same placing at the USA Indoor Championships, which brought her another international call-up. She was among the leaders at the 1995 IAAF World Indoor Championships and claimed the 3000 m bronze medal one place behind compatriot Lynn Jennings. This was the first and ultimately Nesbit's only medal for the United States.

Turning to the outdoor season, she was fourth in the 5000 meters at the USA Outdoor Championships then won her first national title at the USA Cross Country Championships. With a sixth-place finish, she led the American women to fifth in the team rankings at the 1995 IAAF World Cross Country Championships. Another national title followed at the 1996 USA Indoor 3000 m.

Nesbit made three further appearances at the IAAF World Cross Country Championships, running in 1996, 1998 and 1999, but failed to register higher than 25th in the individual rankings. She made her first American Olympic team after a third-place finish in the 10,000 m behind Kate Fonshell and Olga Appell at the 1996 United States Olympic Trials. She ran in the heats only at the 1996 Atlanta Olympics.

She also had a successful return to the road running circuit during this period, taking wins at the Reedy River Run (1994 and 1998), the Peachtree Road Race (1995), Cherry Blossom Ten Mile Run (1996), and Virginia 10 Miler (1998).

=== Masters division ===
Nesbit continued running past her late thirties and won her first national masters division title over the 5K run road event in 2002. She set American masters record in the 1500 m and indoor mile run. Her best for the indoor mile is a world record for the 45–49 age group.

== Personal life ==
She married her first husband, Bill Kerwin in the early 1990s and the pair had a daughter, Sarah Jane, around 1993. She had two further daughters, Rosie and Lizzie, and after divorce married her second husband, Dave.

== Personal records ==
Outdoor track

- 1500 metres – 4:12.40 (1992)
- 3000 metres – 8:51.92 (1992)
- 5000 metres – 15:24.68 (1995)
- 10,000 metres – 32:54.19 (1984)

Indoor track

- 1500 – 4:21.19 (1985)
- Mile run – 4:40.17 (1989)
- 3000 metres – 8:56.08 (1995)
- Two miles – 10:00.02 (1985)

Road

- 5-kilometer run – 15:40 (1995)
- 8-kilometer run – 26:27 (1989)
- 10-kilometer run – 32:04 (1995)
- 10-mile run – 53:25 (1996)
- Half marathon – 65:47 (1999)
- All information from USA Track & Field and Association of Road Racing Statisticians

== National titles ==
- USA Indoor Track and Field Championships
  - 3000 m: 1996
- USA Cross Country Championships
  - Long race: 1995

== International competitions ==
Year	Competition	Venue	Position	Event	Notes
1992	IAAF World Cup	Havana, Cuba	4th	3000 m	9:12.09
1995	World Indoor Championships	Barcelona, Spain	3rd	3000 m	8:56.08
1995	World Cross Country Championships	Durham, United Kingdom	6th	Senior race	20:50
1995	World Cross Country Championships	Durham, United Kingdom	5th	Team race	111 pts
1996	World Cross Country Championships	Stellenbosch, South Africa	25th	Senior race	21:19
1996	World Cross Country Championships	Stellenbosch, South Africa	13th	Team race	209 pts
1996	Olympic Games	Atlanta, United States	12th (q)	10,000 m	32:33.48
1998	World Cross Country Championships	Marrakesh, Morocco	31st	Senior race	27:24
1998	World Cross Country Championships	Marrakesh, Morocco	5th	Team race	118 pts
1999	World Cross Country Championships	Belfast, United Kingdom	55th	Senior race	30:44
1999	World Cross Country Championships	Belfast, United Kingdom	8th	Team race	136 pts

== See also ==
- List of University of North Carolina at Chapel Hill Olympians
