= 1998 IAAF World Cross Country Championships – Junior men's race =

Junior men's race at the 1998 IAAF World Cross Country Championships
- Organisers: IAAF
- Edition: 26th
- Date: March 22
- Host city: Marrakesh, Morocco
- Venue: Menara district
- Events: 1
- Distances: 8 km – Junior men
- Participation: 133 athletes from 40 nations

The Junior men's race at the 1998 IAAF World Cross Country Championships was held in Marrakesh, Morocco, at the Menara district on March 22, 1998. Reports on the event were given in The New York Times, in the Herald, and for the IAAF.

Complete results for individuals, for teams, medallists, and the results of British athletes were published.

== Race results ==
=== Junior men's race (8 km) ===
==== Individual ====
Rank	Athlete	Country	Time
1st place, gold medalist(s)	Million Wolde	Ethiopia	22:47
2nd place, silver medalist(s)	Richard Limo	Kenya	22:50
3rd place, bronze medalist(s)	Haylu Mekonnen	Ethiopia	22:51
4	Yibeltal Admassu	Ethiopia	22:53
5	Douglas Mumanyi	Kenya	22:54
6	Reuben Kamzee	Kenya	22:55
7	Titus Kipkemboi	Kenya	23:02
8	Alene Emere	Ethiopia	23:06
9	Yitbarek Eshetu	Ethiopia	23:14
10	Adil Kaouch	Morocco	23:17
11	Abraham Cherono	Kenya	23:25
12	Geofrey Naibei	Kenya	23:32
13	Mustapha Mellouk	Morocco	23:55
14	Hailemariam Tegafaw	Ethiopia	24:02
15	Job Sikoria	Uganda	24:06
16	Jafred Lorone	Uganda	24:07
17	Vincent Kuotane	South Africa	24:13
18	Jeffrey Gwebu	South Africa	24:21
19	Ryan Shay	United States	24:22
20	Driss Benismail	Morocco	24:22
21	Kenichiro Setoguchi	Japan	24:35
22	Ahmed Issaoui	Tunisia	24:38
23	Hicham Lamalem	Morocco	24:39
24	Kazunobu Fuse	Japan	24:39
25	Kazuyoshi Tokumoto	Japan	24:40
26	Gabe Jennings	United States	24:42
27	Takhir Mamashayev	Kazakhstan	24:43
28	Whitey Modibe	South Africa	24:46
29	Miguel Angel Pinto	Spain	24:49
30	Yuji Ibi	Japan	24:53
31	Fethi Meftah	Algeria	24:53
32	Mark Thompson	Australia	24:54
33	Francis Musani	Uganda	24:54
34	Shinichiro Okuda	Japan	24:55
35	Tayeb Filali	Algeria	24:57
36	Jorge Torres	United States	24:58
37	Hebert Chokera	Zimbabwe	24:58
38	Wirimai Juwawo	Zimbabwe	24:59
39	George Mofokeng	South Africa	25:01
40	Martin Toroitich	Uganda	25:02
41	Iván Galán	Spain	25:03
42	Ouhand Madani	Algeria	25:05
43	Georges Burrier	France	25:06
44	Gavin Thompson	United Kingdom	25:07
45	Chris Thompson	United Kingdom	25:08
46	Luiz Paula	Brazil	25:10
47	Rafael Martin	Spain	25:12
48	Giovanni Gualdi	Italy	25:13
49	Ferenc Békési	Hungary	25:14
50	Pedro Nimo	Spain	25:14
51	Antony Lokinyen	Canada	25:15
52	Ovidiu Tat	Romania	25:15
53	Mustafa Mohamed	Sweden	25:16
54	Olivier Chardon	France	25:16
55	Nourreddine Bourfaa	Algeria	25:17
56	Ahmed Naïli	Algeria	25:19
57	Yousri Hamdi	Tunisia	25:19
58	Tomoki Sugiyama	Japan	25:23
59	Koen Raymaekers	Netherlands	25:24
60	Yusuf Zepak	Turkey	25:27
61	Mircea Bota	Romania	25:28
62	Joseph Nsubuga	Uganda	25:30
63	Andrey Kuznetsov	Russia	25:31
64	Carlo Schuff	Germany	25:32
65	Adelmir Maier	Brazil	25:33
66	Barry Egan	Ireland	25:33
67	Adrian Blincoe	New Zealand	25:34
68	Andrew Beckwith	United Kingdom	25:35
69	Oleg Gutnik	Belarus	25:36
70	Musa mukomazi	Zimbabwe	25:36
71	Nicolas Winkel	United States	25:37
72	Fakureddine Romdhani	Tunisia	25:38
73	Adel Gharsalli	Tunisia	25:40
74	Raymond Fontaine	France	25:41
75	David Stanley	United Kingdom	25:41
76	Enda Johnson	Ireland	25:42
77	Arbey Rivera	Colombia	25:45
78	Roberto Del Soglio	Italy	25:46
79	David Milne	Canada	25:48
80	Kevin Paulsen	France	25:49
81	Nick Mapp	United Kingdom	25:50
82	Edegar Lobo	Brazil	25:51
83	Marco Corino	Italy	25:51
84	Saïd Berrioui	Morocco	25:52
85	Radhouane El Barni	France	25:54
86	Chad Roberts	Australia	25:55
87	Alvaro Jiménez	Spain	25:55
88	Omar Chavarría	Mexico	25:56
89	Cedric Tentelier	France	25:57
90	Giovanni Catastimenti	Italy	25:59
91	Siyami Türkmen	Turkey	26:01
92	Monel Sabou	Romania	26:01
93	Adrián Peña	Spain	26:03
94	Balázs László	Hungary	26:06
95	Máté Németh	Hungary	26:08
96	Turo Inkiläinen	Finland	26:09
97	Javier Guarin	Colombia	26:10
98	Juan Hernandez	Colombia	26:10
99	Jonathan Matos	Brazil	26:11
100	Hikmat Dastan	Turkey	26:11
101	Lachlan Chisholm	Australia	26:12
102	David Rodriquez	United States	26:13
103	Martin Fedmowski	Australia	26:17
104	Slavko Petrović	Croatia	26:19
105	Paul Morrison	Canada	26:30
106	Andres Mendoza	Mexico	26:32
107	Joeri Jansen	Belgium	26:37
108	Calin Macra	Romania	26:41
109	Sakir Kaya	Turkey	26:43
110	Artyon Zhigalov	Kazakhstan	26:51
111	Jassim Mohammed	United Arab Emirates	26:56
112	Steve Osadiuk	Canada	27:01
113	Norbert Csorba	Hungary	27:06
114	Radu Stroia	Romania	27:07
115	João Varela	Portugal	27:14
116	Willem Rooi	Namibia	27:15
117	Cristiano Mauricio	Canada	27:21
118	Fabian Daza	Colombia	27:27
119	Faustin Mukurarinda	Rwanda	27:29
120	Lorenzo Cannata	Italy	27:51
121	Willie McComb	Canada	28:15
122	Alistair Cragg	South Africa	28:27
123	Mustapha Kharouf	Lebanon	28:28
124	Diyattin Koclardan	Turkey	28:41
125	Youssef Karaki	Lebanon	29:26
126	Dovletmomed Nazarov	Turkmenistan	30:07
127	Abdel Salam Al-Dabajy	Palestine	34:11
—	Sam Haughian	United Kingdom	DNF
—	Pasqualino Zammataro	Italy	DNF
—	Sylvester Mokalakane	South Africa	DNF
—	Farai Nemahwedza	Zimbabwe	DNF
—	Mohamed Abdeloui	Algeria	DNF
—	Ahmed Baday	Morocco	DQ^{†}

^{†}: Ahmed Baday of Morocco was the original 18th-place finisher in 24:18 min, but was disqualified for age falsification.

==== Teams ====
Rank	Team	Points
1st place, gold medalist(s)	Ethiopia: Million Wolde / 1; Haylu Mekonnen / 3; Yibeltal Admassu / 4; Alene Emere / 8; (Yitbarek Eshetu) / (9); (Hailemariam Tegafaw) / (14)	16
2nd place, silver medalist(s)	Kenya: Richard Limo / 2; Douglas Mumanyi / 5; Reuben Kamzee / 6; Titus Kipkemboi / 7; (Abraham Cherono) / (11); (Geofrey Naibei) / (12)	20
3rd place, bronze medalist(s)	Morocco: Adil Kaouch / 10; Mustapha Mellouk / 13; Driss Benismail / 20; Hicham Lamalem / 23; (Saïd Berrioui) / (84)	66
4	Japan: Kenichiro Setoguchi / 21; Kazunobu Fuse / 24; Kazuyoshi Tokumoto / 25; Yuji Ibi / 30; (Shinichiro Okuda) / (34); (Tomoki Sugiyama) / (58)	100
5	South Africa: Vincent Kuotane / 17; Jeffrey Gwebu / 18; Whitey Modibe / 28; George Mofokeng / 39; (Alistair Cragg) / (122); (Sylvester Mokalakane) / (DNF)	102
6	Uganda: Job Sikoria / 15; Jafred Lorone / 16; Francis Musani / 33; Martin Toroitich / 40; (Joseph Nsubuga) / (62)	104
7	United States: Ryan Shay / 19; Gabe Jennings / 26; Jorge Torres / 36; Nicolas Winkel / 71; (David Rodriquez) / (102)	152
8	Algeria: Fethi Meftah / 31; Tayeb Filali / 35; Ouhand Madani / 42; Nourreddine Bourfaa / 55; (Ahmed Naïli) / (56); (Mohamed Abdeloui) / (DNF)	163
9	Spain: Miguel Angel Pinto / 29; Iván Galán / 41; Rafael Martin / 47; Pedro Nimo / 50; (Alvaro Jiménez) / (87); (Adrián Peña) / (93)	167
10	Tunisia: Ahmed Issaoui / 22; Yousri Hamdi / 57; Fakureddine Romdhani / 72; Adel Gharsalli / 73	224
11	United Kingdom: Gavin Thompson / 44; Chris Thompson / 45; Andrew Beckwith / 68; David Stanley / 75; (Nick Mapp) / (81); (Sam Haughian) / (DNF)	232
12	France: Georges Burrier / 43; Olivier Chardon / 54; Raymond Fontaine / 74; Kevin Paulsen / 80; (Radhouane El Barni) / (85); (Cedric Tentelier) / (89)	251
13	Brazil: Luiz Paula / 46; Adelmir Maier / 65; Edegar Lobo / 82; Jonathan Matos / 99	292
14	Italy: Giovanni Gualdi / 48; Roberto Del Soglio / 78; Marco Corino / 83; Giovanni Catastimenti / 90; (Lorenzo Cannata) / (120); (Pasqualino Zammataro) / (DNF)	299
15	Romania: Ovidiu Tat / 52; Mircea Bota / 61; Monel Sabou / 92; Calin Macra / 108; (Radu Stroia) / (114)	313
16	Australia: Mark Thompson / 32; Chad Roberts / 86; Lachlan Chisholm / 101; Martin Fedmowski / 103	322
17	Canada: Antony Lokinyen / 51; David Milne / 79; Paul Morrison / 105; Steve Osadiuk / 112; (Cristiano Mauricio) / (117); (Willie McComb) / (121)	347
18	Hungary: Ferenc Békési / 49; Balázs László / 94; Máté Németh / 95; Norbert Csorba / 113	351
19	Turkey: Yusuf Zepak / 60; Siyami Türkmen / 91; Hikmat Dastan / 100; Sakir Kaya / 109; (Diyattin Koclardan) / (124)	360
20	Colombia: Arbey Rivera / 77; Javier Guarin / 97; Juan Hernandez / 98; Fabian Daza / 118	390
DNF	Zimbabwe: Hebert Chokera / (37); Wirimai Juwawo / (38); Musa Nkomazi / (70); Farai Nemahwedza / (DNF)	DNF

- Note: Athletes in parentheses did not score for the team result

== Participation ==
An unofficial count yields the participation of 133 athletes from 40 countries in the Junior men's race. This is in agreement with the official numbers as published.

- Algeria (6)
- Australia (4)
- Belarus (1)
- Belgium (1)
- Brazil (4)
- Canada (6)
- Colombia (4)
- Croatia (1)
- Ethiopia (6)
- Finland (1)
- France (6)
- Germany (1)
- Hungary (4)
- Ireland (2)
- Italy (6)
- Japan (6)
- Kazakhstan (2)
- Kenya (6)
- Lebanon (2)
- Mexico (2)
- Morocco (6)
- Namibia (1)
- Netherlands (1)
- New Zealand (1)
- Palestine (1)
- Portugal (1)
- Romania (5)
- Russia (1)
- Rwanda (1)
- South Africa (6)
- Spain (6)
- Sweden (1)
- Tunisia (4)
- Turkey (5)
- Turkmenistan (1)
- Uganda (5)
- United Arab Emirates (1)
- United Kingdom (6)
- United States (5)
- Zimbabwe (4)

== See also ==
- 1998 IAAF World Cross Country Championships – Senior men's race
- 1998 IAAF World Cross Country Championships – Men's short race
- 1998 IAAF World Cross Country Championships – Senior women's race
- 1998 IAAF World Cross Country Championships – Women's short race
- 1998 IAAF World Cross Country Championships – Junior women's race
