= Ali Ezzine =

Moroccan athlete (born 1978)

Medal record

Men's athletics

Representing Morocco

Olympic Games
Bronze medal – third place	2000 Sydney	3000 m st.

World Championships
Silver medal – second place	2001 Edmonton	3000 m st.
Bronze medal – third place	1999 Sevilla	3000 m st.

Ali Ezzine (Arabic: علي الزين; born 3 September 1978 in Ain Taoujdate) is a Moroccan athlete who specializes in the 3000 metres steeplechase. He won the bronze medal in this event at the 2000 Summer Olympics.

He first came to prominence with a bronze medal in the steeplechase at the 1996 World Junior Championships in Athletics, also held in Sydney. His first senior medal came at the 1998 IAAF World Cross Country Championships, where his twelfth-place finish helped the Moroccan men to the team silver medal.

He had his first individual global success at the World Championships in Athletics. At the 1999 World Championships he won the bronze medal in the men's steeplechase. He also won the bronze at the 1999 IAAF Grand Prix Final. Two years later, after his Olympic medal performance, he attended the 2001 World Championships and improved to the silver medal. He returned to the Olympic stage at the 2004 Athens Olympics, but he did not reach the podium on that occasion, finishing in eighth in the final.

In 1999 he achieved the fastest ever time in the steeplechase for a non-Kenyan athlete (8:03.57). This mark has since been surpassed by several other non-Kenyans.

== Achievements ==
Year	Competition	Venue	Position	Event	Notes
Representing Morocco
1996	World Junior Championships	Sydney, Australia	3rd	3000 m st.	8:35.60
1997	World Cross Country Championships	Turin, Italy	11th	Junior race (8.511 km)	25:24
1998	World Cross Country Championships	Marrakesh, Morocco	12th	Short race (4 km)	11:14
1998	World Cross Country Championships	Marrakesh, Morocco	2nd	Team	42 pts
1999	World Championships	Seville, Spain	3rd	3000 m st.	8:12.73
1999	Grand Prix Final	Munich, Germany	3rd	3000 m st.	8:08.64
2000	World Cross Country Championships	Vilamoura, Portugal	13th	Short race (4.18 km)	11:39
2000	World Cross Country Championships	Vilamoura, Portugal	3rd	Team	68 pts
2000	Olympic Games	Sydney, Australia	3rd	3000 m st.	8:22.15
2001	World Championships	Edmonton, Canada	2nd	3000 m st.	8:16.21
2002	World Cross Country Championships	Dublin, Ireland	54th	Short race (4.208 km)	13:01
2003	World Championships	Paris, France	10th	3000 m st.	8:19.15
2003	World Athletics Final	Monte Carlo, Monaco	7th	3000 m st.	8:18.05
2004	World Cross Country Championships	Brussels, Belgium	51st	Short race (4 km)	12:26
2004	Olympic Games	Athens, Greece	8th	3000 m st.	8:15.58
2004	World Athletics Final	Monte Carlo, Monaco	9th	3000 m st.	8:32.04

=== Personal bests ===
- 1500 metres – 3:43.8 min (1998)
- 3000 metres – 7:45.9 min (2004)
- 5000 metres – 13:32.56 min (1997)
- 3000 metres steeplechase – 8:03.57 min (2000)
