= Pascal Dobert =

American steeplechase runner

Personal information
- Born: April 8, 1974 (age 52) Washington, D.C., U.S.

Sport
- Country: United States
- Sport: Athletics
- Event: Steeplechase

Pascal Dobert (born April 8, 1974) is an American steeplechase runner.

He finished seventh at the 1998 IAAF World Cup and competed at the 1999 World Championships and the 2000 Summer Olympics without reaching the final. Dobert was born in Washington, D.C.

Running for the Wisconsin Badgers track and field team, Dobert won the 1997 NCAA Division I Outdoor Track and Field Championships in the steeplechase.

His personal best time was 8:15.77 minutes, achieved in July 2000 in Sacramento.

As of 2018, he is the assistant coach to Jerry Schumacher for the Bowerman Track Club.
