= 1998 IAAF World Cross Country Championships – Senior women's race =

Senior women's race at the 1998 IAAF World Cross Country Championships
- Organisers: IAAF
- Edition: 26th
- Date: March 21
- Host city: Marrakesh, Morocco
- Venue: Menara district
- Events: 1
- Distances: 8 km – Senior women
- Participation: 97 athletes from 29 nations

The senior women's race at the 1998 IAAF World Cross Country Championships was held in Marrakesh, Morocco, at the Menara district on March 21, 1998. Reports on the event were given in The New York Times, in the Herald, and for the IAAF.

Complete results for individuals, for teams, medallists, and the results of British athletes were published.

== Race results ==
=== Senior women's race (8 km) ===
==== Individual ====
Rank	Athlete	Country	Time
1st place, gold medalist(s)	Sonia O'Sullivan	Ireland	25:39
2nd place, silver medalist(s)	Paula Radcliffe	United Kingdom	25:42
3rd place, bronze medalist(s)	Gete Wami	Ethiopia	25:49
4	Merima Denboba	Ethiopia	25:56
5	Jackline Maranga	Kenya	25:56
6	Julia Vaquero	Spain	26:06
7	Jane Omoro	Kenya	26:07
8	Leah Malot	Kenya	26:16
9	Ayelech Worku	Ethiopia	26:17
10	Sally Barsosio	Kenya	26:27
11	Naomi Mugo	Kenya	26:33
12	Susan Chepkemei	Kenya	26:35
13	Hayley Haining	United Kingdom	26:40
14	Nora Rocha	Mexico	26:49
15	Colleen de Reuck	South Africa	26:51
16	Rocío Ríos	Spain	26:53
17	Restituta Joseph	Tanzania	27:00
18	Blandine Bitzner-Ducret	France	27:03
19	Kylie Risk	Australia	27:04
20	Deena Drossin	United States	27:06
21	Getenesh Urge	Ethiopia	27:07
22	Svetlana Baygulova	Russia	27:07
23	Nyla Carroll	New Zealand	27:08
24	Chiemi Takahashi	Japan	27:17
25	Vikki McPherson	United Kingdom	27:18
26	Samukeliso Moyo	Zimbabwe	27:20
27	Yukiko Mita	Japan	27:21
28	Yoko Shibui	Japan	27:21
29	Elisabeth Mongudhi	Namibia	27:22
30	Liz Wilson	United States	27:23
31	Joan Nesbit	United States	27:24
32	Natalie Harvey	Australia	27:24
33	Beatriz Santíago	Spain	27:27
34	Liz Talbot	United Kingdom	27:28
35	Conceição Ferreira	Portugal	27:29
36	Asha Gigi	Ethiopia	27:37
37	Nnenna Lynch	United States	27:41
38	María Abel	Spain	27:41
39	Leila Aman	Ethiopia	27:48
40	Anja Smolders	Belgium	27:49
41	Yamna Belkacem	France	27:50
42	Teresa Recio	Spain	27:52
43	Christine Mallo	France	27:53
44	Wioletta Kryza	Poland	27:56
45	Ai Fukuchi	Japan	27:58
46	Singasi Dube	Zimbabwe	27:59
47	Manuela Dias	Portugal	28:00
48	Annemari Sandell	Finland	28:01
49	Ana Correia	Portugal	28:03
50	Mandy Giblin	Australia	28:06
51	Hussein Hawa	Tanzania	28:07
52	Kristin Ihle	United States	28:08
53	Lucy Wright	United Kingdom	28:09
54	Lisa Dick	Australia	28:10
55	Tina Connelly	Canada	28:11
56	Valerie Vaughan	Ireland	28:13
57	Chantal Dällenbach	France	28:20
58	Charné Rademeyer	South Africa	28:20
59	Angela Joiner	United Kingdom	28:21
60	Sultana Aït Hammou	Morocco	28:33
61	Marina Bastos	Portugal	28:37
62	Fatima Yvelain	France	28:40
63	Zena Wilsnach	South Africa	28:41
64	Ana Gimeno	Spain	28:44
65	Rosa Oliveira	Portugal	28:50
66	Michele Chalmers	United States	28:53
67	Fatiha Klilech	Morocco	28:56
68	Maureen Harrington	Ireland	28:58
69	Fatiha Baouf	Morocco	29:07
70	Cari Rampersad	Canada	29:08
71	Anne Keenan-Buckley	Ireland	29:11
72	Rosa Mila Ibarra	Colombia	29:13
73	Maria Moraes	Brazil	29:26
74	Teresa Duffy	Ireland	29:31
75	Linda Thyer	Canada	29:34
76	Adriana de Souza	Brazil	29:36
77	Marcela Jackson	Costa Rica	29:39
78	Asmae Leghzaoui	Morocco	29:40
79	Miriam Caldasso	Brazil	29:40
80	Maria Polyzou	Greece	29:45
81	Melody Marcus	South Africa	29:48
82	Widad Farissi	Morocco	29:48
83	Message Mapfumo	Zimbabwe	30:03
84	Irina Troyeglazova	Kazakhstan	30:29
85	Maria Rodriguez	Colombia	30:32
86	Saadia Zakar	Morocco	30:34
87	Marvelous Kativhu	Zimbabwe	30:51
88	Svetlana Kasymskya	Turkmenistan	31:46
89	Violet Dudeleva	Turkmenistan	33:55
90	Rosemary Omundsen	Papua New Guinea	34:32
—	Stella Castro	Colombia	DNF
—	Helena Sampaio	Portugal	DNF
—	Jacqueline Mota	Canada	DNF
—	Joalsiae Llado	France	DNF
—	Adriana Agudelo	Colombia	DNF
—	Marta Mokofna	South Africa	DNF
—	Magdaline Morobi	South Africa	DNF

==== Teams ====
Rank	Team	Points
1st place, gold medalist(s)	Kenya: Jackline Maranga / 5; Jane Omoro / 7; Leah Malot / 8; Sally Barsosio / 10; (Naomi Mugo) / (11); (Susan Chepkemei) / (12)	30
2nd place, silver medalist(s)	Ethiopia: Gete Wami / 3; Merima Denboba / 4; Ayelech Worku / 9; Getenesh Urge / 21; (Asha Gigi) / (36); (Leila Aman) / (39)	37
3rd place, bronze medalist(s)	United Kingdom: Paula Radcliffe / 2; Hayley Haining / 13; Vikki McPherson / 25; Liz Talbot / 34; (Lucy Wright) / (53); (Angela Joiner) / (59)	74
4	Spain: Julia Vaquero / 6; Rocío Ríos / 16; Beatriz Santíago / 33; María Abel / 38; (Teresa Recio) / (42); (Ana Gimeno) / (64)	93
5	United States: Deena Drossin / 20; Liz Wilson / 30; Joan Nesbit / 31; Nnenna Lynch / 37; (Kristin Ihle) / (52); (Michele Chalmers) / (66)	118
6	Japan: Chiemi Takahashi / 24; Yukiko Mita / 27; Yoko Shibui / 28; Ai Fukuchi / 45	124
7	Australia: Kylie Risk / 19; Natalie Harvey / 32; Mandy Giblin / 50; Lisa Dick / 54	155
8	France: Blandine Bitzner-Ducret / 18; Yamna Belkacem / 41; Christine Mallo / 43; Chantal Dällenbach / 57; (Fatima Yvelain) / (62); (Joalsiae Llado) / (DNF)	159
9	Portugal: Conceição Ferreira / 35; Manuela Dias / 47; Ana Correia / 49; Marina Bastos / 61; (Rosa Oliveira) / (65); (Helena Sampaio) / (DNF)	192
10	Ireland: Sonia O'Sullivan / 1; Valerie Vaughan / 56; Maureen Harrington / 68; Anne Keenan-Buckley / 71; (Teresa Duffy) / (74)	196
11	South Africa: Colleen de Reuck / 15; Charné Rademeyer / 58; Zena Wilsnach / 63; Melody Marcus / 81; (Marta Mokofna) / (DNF); (Magdaline Morobi) / (DNF)	217
12	Zimbabwe: Samukeliso Moyo / 26; Singasi Dube / 46; Message Mapfumo / 83; Marvelous Kativhu / 87	242
13	Morocco: Sultana Aït Hammou / 60; Fatiha Klilech / 67; Fatiha Baouf / 69; Asmae Leghzaoui / 78; (Widad Farissi) / (82); (Saadia Zakar) / (86)	274
DNF	Canada: Tina Connelly / (55); Cari Rampersad / (70); Linda Thyer / (75); Jacqueline Mota / (DNF)	DNF
DNF	Colombia: Rosa Mila Ibarra / (72); Maria Rodriguez / (85); Stella Castro / (DNF); Adriana Agudelo / (DNF)	DNF

- Note: Athletes in parentheses did not score for the team result

== Participation ==
An unofficial count yields the participation of 97 athletes from 29 countries in the Senior women's race. This is in agreement with the official numbers as published.

- Australia (4)
- Belgium (1)
- Brazil (3)
- Canada (4)
- Colombia (4)
- Costa Rica (1)
- Ethiopia (6)
- Finland (1)
- France (6)
- Greece (1)
- Ireland (5)
- Japan (4)
- Kazakhstan (1)
- Kenya (6)
- Mexico (1)
- Morocco (6)
- Namibia (1)
- New Zealand (1)
- Papua New Guinea (1)
- Poland (1)
- Portugal (6)
- Russia (1)
- South Africa (6)
- Spain (6)
- Tanzania (2)
- Turkmenistan (2)
- United Kingdom (6)
- United States (6)
- Zimbabwe (4)

== See also ==
- 1998 IAAF World Cross Country Championships – Senior men's race
- 1998 IAAF World Cross Country Championships – Men's short race
- 1998 IAAF World Cross Country Championships – Junior men's race
- 1998 IAAF World Cross Country Championships – Women's short race
- 1998 IAAF World Cross Country Championships – Junior women's race
