= 1998 IAAF World Cross Country Championships – Women's short race =

Women's short race at the 1998 IAAF World Cross Country Championships
- Organisers: IAAF
- Edition: 26th
- Date: March 22
- Host city: Marrakesh, Morocco
- Venue: Menara district
- Events: 6
- Distances: 4 km – Women's short
- Participation: 86 athletes from 24 nations

The Women's short race at the 1998 IAAF World Cross Country Championships was held in Marrakesh, Morocco, at the Menara district on March 22, 1998. Reports on the event were given in The New York Times, in the Herald, and for the IAAF.

Complete results for individuals, for teams, medallists, and the results of British athletes were published.

== Race results ==
=== Women's short race (4 km) ===
==== Individual ====
Rank	Athlete	Country	Time
1st place, gold medalist(s)	Sonia O'Sullivan	Ireland	12:20
2nd place, silver medalist(s)	Zahra Ouaziz	Morocco	12:34
3rd place, bronze medalist(s)	Kutre Dulecha	Ethiopia	12:37
4	Anita Weyermann	Switzerland	12:45
5	Restituta Joseph	Tanzania	12:46
6	Beatrice Omwanza	Kenya	12:47
7	Rodica Nagel	France	12:48
8	Elva Dryer	United States	12:51
9	Amy Rudolph	United States	12:51
10	Samukeliso Moyo	Zimbabwe	12:51
11	Genet Gebregiorgis	Ethiopia	12:52
12	Grethe Koens	Netherlands	12:56
13	Zhor El Kamch	Morocco	12:59
14	Nyla Carroll	New Zealand	13:00
15	Hannah Njeri	Kenya	13:01
16	Constantina Diţă	Romania	13:03
17	Alemitu Bekele	Ethiopia	13:05
18	Saliha Khaldoun	Morocco	13:06
19	Carla Sacramento	Portugal	13:06
20	Hussein Hawa	Tanzania	13:07
21	Marta Domínguez	Spain	13:08
22	Amaia Piedra	Spain	13:09
23	Stela Olteanu	Romania	13:10
24	Seloua Ouaziz	Morocco	13:10
25	Molly Watcke	United States	13:11
26	Kathy Franey	United States	13:13
27	Yihunelesh Bekele	Ethiopia	13:14
28	Margareta Keszeg	Romania	13:15
29	Samra Raif	Morocco	13:17
30	Natalia Azpiazu	Spain	13:18
31	Olena Gorodnychova	Ukraine	13:18
32	Etaferahu Yimer	Ethiopia	13:19
33	Karen Candaele	United States	13:20
34	Heather DeGeest	Canada	13:20
35	Stéphanie Berthevas	France	13:22
36	Janeth Caizalitín	Ecuador	13:22
37	Cristina Iloc	Romania	13:23
38	Jebet Langat	Kenya	13:26
39	Gladys Agui	Kenya	13:26
40	Cristina Petite	Spain	13:27
41	Sabrina Varrone	Italy	13:28
42	Jacqueline Martín	Spain	13:29
43	Tambra Dunn	Canada	13:30
44	Flavia Gaviglio	Italy	13:30
45	Nataliya Romanchuk	Ukraine	13:34
46	Helen Pattinson	United Kingdom	13:35
47	Elisa Rea	Italy	13:35
48	Olimpia Pop	Romania	13:35
49	Margaret Mahohoma	Zimbabwe	13:38
50	Elsabet Truneh	Ethiopia	13:39
51	Elizabeth Chemweno	Kenya	13:39
52	Célia dos Santos	Brazil	13:41
53	Estíbaliz Urrutia	Spain	13:42
54	Dalila Tahi	Algeria	13:43
55	Sarah Dupré	Canada	13:44
56	Rose Kosgei	Kenya	13:45
57	Sonia Barry	New Zealand	13:45
58	Singasi Dube	Zimbabwe	13:46
59	Nouria Mérah-Benida	Algeria	13:46
60	Lucilla Andreucci	Italy	13:47
61	Nicola Slater	United Kingdom	13:47
62	María Paredes	Ecuador	13:49
63	Tatyana Kryvobok	Ukraine	13:49
64	Amanda Crowe	United Kingdom	13:52
65	Ilaria Di Santo	Italy	13:53
66	Fran ten Bensel	United States	13:53
67	Tatyana Glazyr	Ukraine	13:53
68	Serenella Sbrissa	Italy	13:53
69	Sarah Bentley	United Kingdom	13:54
70	Wilma Guerra	Ecuador	13:54
71	Marina Nascimento	Brazil	13:55
72	Kheira Arfa	Algeria	13:56
73	Hasna Benhassi	Morocco	13:57
74	Selma dos Reis	Brazil	13:59
75	Meegan Larsen	Canada	14:06
76	Amanda Parkinson	United Kingdom	14:10
77	Denisa Costescu	Romania	14:11
78	Fatiha Hanika	Algeria	14:15
79	Ana de Souza	Brazil	14:17
80	Saliha Kacemi	Algeria	14:39
81	Yolanda Quinbita	Ecuador	14:57
82	Hamida Mazouzi	Algeria	15:11
83	Shylet Siziba	Zimbabwe	15:29
84	Marie Sylvie Duval	Mauritius	16:20
85	Hoda El-Awadi	Lebanon	16:21
86	Rosemary Omundsen	Papua New Guinea	16:57

==== Teams ====
Rank	Team	Points
1st place, gold medalist(s)	Morocco: Zahra Ouaziz / 2; Zhor El Kamch / 13; Saliha Khaldoun / 18; Seloua Ouaziz / 24; (Samra Raif) / (29); (Hasna Benhassi) / (73)	57
2nd place, silver medalist(s)	Ethiopia: Kutre Dulecha / 3; Genet Gebregiorgis / 11; Alemitu Bekele / 17; Yihunelesh Bekele / 27; (Etaferahu Yimer) / (32); (Elsabet Truneh) / (50)	58
3rd place, bronze medalist(s)	United States: Elva Dryer / 8; Amy Rudolph / 9; Molly Watcke / 25; Kathy Franey / 26; (Karen Candaele) / (33); (Fran ten Bensel) / (66)	68
4	Kenya: Beatrice Omwanza / 6; Hannah Njeri / 15; Jebet Langat / 38; Gladys Agui / 39; (Elizabeth Chemweno) / (51); (Rose Kosgei) / (56)	98
5	Romania: Constantina Diţă / 16; Stela Olteanu / 23; Margareta Keszeg / 28; Cristina Iloc / 37; (Olimpia Pop) / (48); (Denisa Costescu) / (77)	104
6	Spain: Marta Domínguez / 21; Amaia Piedra / 22; Natalia Azpiazu / 30; Cristina Petite / 40; (Jacqueline Martín) / (42); (Estíbaliz Urrutia) / (53)	113
7	Italy: Sabrina Varrone / 41; Flavia Gaviglio / 44; Elisa Rea / 47; Lucilla Andreucci / 60; (Ilaria Di Santo) / (65); (Serenella Sbrissa) / (68)	192
8	Zimbabwe: Samukeliso Moyo / 10; Margaret Mahohoma / 49; Singasi Dube / 58; Shylet Siziba / 83	200
9	Ukraine: Olena Gorodnychova / 31; Nataliya Romanchuk / 45; Tatyana Kryvobok / 63; Tatyana Glazyr / 67	206
10	Canada: Heather DeGeest / 34; Tambra Dunn / 43; Sarah Dupré / 55; Meegan Larsen / 75	207
11	United Kingdom: Helen Pattinson / 46; Nicola Slater / 61; Amanda Crowe / 64; Sarah Bentley / 69; (Amanda Parkinson) / (76)	240
12	Ecuador: Janeth Caizalitín / 36; María Paredes / 62; Wilma Guerra / 70; Yolanda Quinbita / 81	249
13	Algeria: Dalila Tahi / 54; Nouria Mérah-Benida / 59; Kheira Arfa / 72; Fatiha Hanika / 78; (Saliha Kacemi) / (80); (Hamida Mazouzi) / (82)	263
14	Brazil: Célia dos Santos / 52; Marina Nascimento / 71; Selma dos Reis / 74; Ana de Souza / 79	276

- Note: Athletes in parentheses did not score for the team result

== Participation ==
An unofficial count yields the participation of 86 athletes from 24 countries in the Women's short race. This is in agreement with the official numbers as published.

- Algeria (6)
- Brazil (4)
- Canada (4)
- Ecuador (4)
- Ethiopia (6)
- France (2)
- Ireland (1)
- Italy (6)
- Kenya (6)
- Lebanon (1)
- Mauritius (1)
- Morocco (6)
- Netherlands (1)
- New Zealand (2)
- Papua New Guinea (1)
- Portugal (1)
- Romania (6)
- Spain (6)
- Switzerland (1)
- Tanzania (2)
- Ukraine (4)
- United Kingdom (5)
- United States (6)
- Zimbabwe (4)

== See also ==
- 1998 IAAF World Cross Country Championships – Senior men's race
- 1998 IAAF World Cross Country Championships – Men's short race
- 1998 IAAF World Cross Country Championships – Junior men's race
- 1998 IAAF World Cross Country Championships – Senior women's race
- 1998 IAAF World Cross Country Championships – Junior women's race
