= Abderahmane Djemadi =

Algerian long-distance runner

Abderahmane Djemadi (born 13 July 1970) is a retired Algerian long-distance runner.

At the 1998 World Cross Country Championships, he finished 38th in the short race. This earned him an eighth place in the team competition with the Algerian team.

Djemadi was later found guilty of refusal to submit to doping control. He was suspended from the sport, from January 2001 to January 2003.
