= Tim Broe =

American long-distance runner

Tim Broe (born June 20, 1977, in Peoria, Illinois) is a retired American long-distance runner. He reached the 5000 meters final at the 2004 Summer Olympics finishing eleventh. Tim competed collegiately for the University of Alabama where his 3,000m steeplechase record still stands. He is a cross country running and track and field coach. In his second year of coaching Wellesley High School boys cross country, the team won the MIAA Division State Cross Country Championships.

== Competition record ==
Year	Competition	Venue	Position	Event	Notes
Representing the United States
2001	World Indoor Championships	Lisbon, Portugal	16th (h)	3000 m	8:09.37
2001	World Championships	Edmonton, Canada	11th	3000 m s'chase	8:23.07
2001	Goodwill Games	Brisbane, Australia	5th	3000 m s'chase	8:20.75
2004	Olympic Games	Athens, Greece	11th	5000 m	13:33.06
2005	World Championships	Helsinki, Finland	26th (h)	5000 m	13:51.17

Also won the USA Cross Country 4K Championship in 2000 & 2001.

== Personal bests ==
Outdoor

- 1500 meters – 3:38.43 (Braaschaart 2004)
- One mile – 4:03.08 (Des Moines 2002)
- 3000 meters – 7:39.45 (Lausanne 2001)
- 5000 meters – 13:11.77 (Oslo 2005)
- 3000 meters steeplechase – 8:14.82 (Rome 2001)

Indoor

- One mile – 3:58.81 (New York 2002)
- 3000 meters – 7:39.23 (Boston 2002)

== Personal life ==
Tim Broe had aspirations of becoming a professional fisherman.
