= Marco Cepeda =

Spanish middle-distance runner

Personal information
- Nationality: Spanish
- Born: 1 July 1974 (age 52)

Sport
- Sport: Middle-distance running
- Event: Steeplechase

Marco Cepeda (born 1 July 1974) is a Spanish middle-distance runner. He competed in the men's 3000 metres steeplechase at the 2000 Summer Olympics.
