= 1999 IAAF Grand Prix Final =

- Host city: Munich, Germany
- Events: 18
- Dates: 11 September
- Main venue: Olympic Stadium

The 1999 IAAF Grand Prix Final was the fifteenth edition of the season-ending competition for the IAAF Grand Prix track and field circuit, organised by the International Association of Athletics Federations. It was held on 11 September at the Olympic Stadium in Munich, Germany.

Bernard Barmasai (3000 metres steeplechase) and Gabriela Szabo (3000 metres) were the overall points winners of the tournament. A total of 18 athletics events were contested, ten for men and eight for women.

== Medal summary ==
=== Men ===
Event	Gold		Silver		Bronze	
Overall	Bernard Barmasai (KEN)	111	Kostas Gatsioudis (GRE)	109	Wilson Kipketer (DEN)	108
200 metres	Claudinei da Silva (BRA)	19.89	Maurice Greene (USA)	19.90	Francis Obikwelu (NGR)	20.12
800 metres	Wilson Kipketer (DEN)	1:43.55	Hezekiél Sepeng (RSA)	1:44.40	Japheth Kimutai (KEN)	1:44.48
1500 metres	Noah Ngeny (KEN)	3:28.93	Bernard Lagat (KEN)	3:32.30	Laban Rotich (KEN)	3:33.40
3000 metres	Benjamin Limo (KEN)	7:36.32	Paul Bitok (KEN)	7:36.60	Mohammed Mourhit (BEL)	7:36.73
3000 metres steeplechase	Bernard Barmasai (KEN)	8:06.92	Wilson Boit Kipketer (KEN)	8:08.28	Ali Ezzine (MAR)	8:08.64
110 m hurdles	Mark Crear (USA)	13.02	Colin Jackson (GBR)	13.17	Larry Wade (USA)	13.19
Pole vault	Maksim Tarasov (RUS)	5.85 m	Jeff Hartwig (USA)	5.80 m	Dmitriy Markov (BLR)	5.80 m
Long jump	Iván Pedroso (CUB)	8.43 m	James Beckford (JAM)	8.29w m	Erick Walder (USA)	8.15 m
Discus throw	Lars Riedel (GER)	68.61 m	Virgilijus Alekna (LTU)	66.65 m	Anthony Washington (USA)	66.22 m
Javelin throw	Kostas Gatsioudis (GRE)	89.84 m	Jan Železný (CZE)	87.71 m	Raymond Hecht (GER)	85.64 m

=== Women ===
Event	Gold		Silver		Bronze	
Overall	Gabriela Szabo (ROM)	108	Maria Mutola (MOZ)	108	Deon Hemmings (JAM)	104
200 metres	Savatheda Fynes (BAH)	22.55	Merlene Frazer (JAM)	22.55	Beverly McDonald (JAM) Inger Miller (USA)	22.64
800 metres	Maria Mutola (MOZ)	1:59.10	Ludmila Formanová (CZE)	1:59.15	Svetlana Masterkova (RUS)	1:59.20
1500 metres	Violeta Szekely (ROM)	4:15.18	Anita Weyermann (SUI)	4:15.92	Jackline Maranga (KEN)	4:16.60
3000 metres	Gabriela Szabo (ROM)	8:43.52	Zahra Ouaziz (MAR)	8:43.66	Irina Mikitenko (GER)	8:45.59
400 m hurdles	Deon Hemmings (JAM)	53.41	Andrea Blackett (BAR)	53.63	Sandra Glover (USA)	53.83
High jump	Hestrie Cloete (RSA)	1.96 m	Inga Babakova (UKR) Zuzana Hlavonová (CZE)	1.96 m	Not awarded	
Triple jump	Ashia Hansen (GBR)	14.96 m	Paraskevi Tsiamita (GRE)	14.77 m	Tatyana Lebedeva (RUS)	14.66 m
Shot put	Nadine Kleinert (GER)	19.16 m	Astrid Kumbernuss (GER)	19.13 m	Connie Price-Smith (USA)	18.71 m
