= 1998 IAAF World Cross Country Championships – Junior women's race =

Junior women's race at the 1998 IAAF World Cross Country Championships
- Organisers: IAAF
- Edition: 26th
- Date: March 21
- Host city: Marrakesh, Morocco
- Venue: Menara district
- Events: 1
- Distances: 6 km – Junior women
- Participation: 122 athletes from 35 nations

The Junior women's race at the 1998 IAAF World Cross Country Championships was held in Marrakesh, Morocco, at the Menara district on March 21, 1998. Reports on the event were given in The New York Times, in the Herald, and for the IAAF.

Complete results for individuals, for teams, medallists, and the results of British athletes were published.

== Race results ==
=== Junior women's race (6 km) ===
==== Individual ====
Rank	Athlete	Country	Time
1st place, gold medalist(s)	Yimenashu Taye	Ethiopia	19:32
2nd place, silver medalist(s)	Jeruto Kiptum	Kenya	19:34
3rd place, bronze medalist(s)	Worknesh Kidane	Ethiopia	19:34
4	Alemgena Bezabeh	Ethiopia	19:46
5	Vivian Cheruiyot	Kenya	19:47
6	Margaret Chepkemboi	Kenya	19:48
7	Agnes Kiprop	Kenya	19:57
8	Merima Hashim	Ethiopia	19:59
9	Emiko Kojima	Japan	20:02
10	Émilie Mondor	Canada	20:16
11	Prisca Ngetich	Kenya	20:16
12	René Kalmer	South Africa	20:17
13	Malika Asahssah	Morocco	20:17
14	Yoshiko Fujinaga	Japan	20:28
15	Cathérine Lallemand	Belgium	20:29
16	Hareg Sidelil	Ethiopia	20:37
17	Tereza Yohanes	Ethiopia	20:38
18	Salome Boiyo	Kenya	20:50
19	Risa Tanaka	Japan	20:50
20	Melinda Campbell	United States	20:51
21	Tuula Laitinen	Finland	20:53
22	Katalin Szentgyörgyi	Hungary	20:54
23	Hind Chahid	Morocco	20:55
24	Miho Nakashima	Japan	20:56
25	Elaine du Plessis	South Africa	20:58
26	Ionela Bungardean	Romania	20:59
27	Siphuluwazi Sibindi	Zimbabwe	21:10
28	Yolandi Neuhoff	South Africa	21:11
29	Chioko Sakaue	Japan	21:12
30	Sonja Stolić	FR Yugoslavia	21:15
31	Yelena Tolstygina	Belarus	21:15
32	Soumia Mastacou	Morocco	21:17
33	Catherine Maapela	South Africa	21:17
34	Nokhutula Muhkuli	Zimbabwe	21:18
35	Vanessa Veiga	Spain	21:22
36	Lize-Mari Venter	South Africa	21:28
37	Lynda Rabhi	Algeria	21:29
38	Sabrina Mockenhaupt	Germany	21:29
39	Alessia Lutskovskaya	Russia	21:30
40	Federica Gogele	Italy	21:33
41	Nicole Chapple	Australia	21:34
42	Riina Tolonen	Finland	21:37
43	Elena Perez	Spain	21:39
44	Kattell Villain	France	21:39
45	Laura Heiner	United States	21:43
46	Bouchra Benthami	Morocco	21:50
47	Sibusisiwe Nyoni	Zimbabwe	21:50
48	Kazuko Kanno	Japan	21:51
49	Minna Myllykoski	Finland	21:51
50	Caroline Walsh	United Kingdom	21:52
51	Tara Rohatinsky	United States	21:53
52	Fouzia Zoutat	Algeria	21:55
53	Minna Nummela	Finland	21:56
54	Ljiljana Culibrk	Croatia	21:57
55	Kenza Dahmani	Algeria	22:00
56	Nassira Taibi	Algeria	22:00
57	Mirjana Glisovic	FR Yugoslavia	22:01
58	Louise Kelly	United Kingdom	22:02
59	Melanie Schulz	Germany	22:02
60	Judith Heinze	Germany	22:03
61	Chantal Berthelot	France	22:03
62	Martha Garces	Mexico	22:04
63	Johanna Raja-aho	Finland	22:05
64	Tara Struyk	Canada	22:06
65	Karen Fletcher	United Kingdom	22:06
66	Inês Monteiro	Portugal	22:10
67	Letitia Pheleu	South Africa	22:15
68	Christine Mukamutesi	Rwanda	22:16
69	Vincenza Sicari	Italy	22:20
70	Natalia Rodríguez	Spain	22:23
71	Marta Gómez	Spain	22:25
72	Desneiges McLean	Canada	22:26
73	Luana Pocorobba	Italy	22:28
74	Sharolyn Shields	Canada	22:29
75	Mariel Ettinger	United States	22:32
76	Rosaria Console	Italy	22:33
77	Ann Ramsey	United States	22:33
78	Michelle Costa	Brazil	22:34
79	Epiphanie Nyirabarame	Rwanda	22:35
80	Hakima Baatouche	Algeria	22:35
81	Ksenija Orsolic	Croatia	22:36
82	Türkan Erişmiş	Turkey	22:39
83	Gabi Kastner	Germany	22:41
84	Rosa Morató	Spain	22:42
85	Rebecca Everett	United Kingdom	22:44
86	Anna Markelova	Turkmenistan	22:46
87	Ulrike Leitheim	Germany	22:47
88	Sonia Thomas	United Kingdom	22:50
89	Silvia Weissteiner	Italy	22:53
90	Demelza Murrihy	New Zealand	22:56
91	Ayfer Yigit	Turkey	23:00
92	Céline Garcia	France	23:01
93	Malindi Elmore	Canada	23:08
94	Sümeyra Tali	Turkey	23:15
95	Katharina Schley	Germany	23:19
96	Eliisa Ahola	Finland	23:25
97	Cristina Pozzo	Italy	23:27
98	Khadija Touati	Algeria	23:33
99	Dina Mijuskovic	Croatia	23:37
100	Vanina Arrua	Argentina	23:41
101	Eugenie Gnoleba	France	23:42
102	Clemantine Nyiraguhirwa	Rwanda	23:52
103	Nilgün Yilmaz	Turkey	24:14
104	Dildar Mamedova	Turkmenistan	24:23
105	Irina Podkorytova	Kazakhstan	24:30
106	Enphasia Nyirangerageze	Rwanda	25:07
107	Diala El-Chabi	Lebanon	25:09
108	Adriana da Silva	Brazil	25:16
109	Francine Byukusenge	Rwanda	26:08
110	Paula Cabrera	Argentina	26:12
111	Ana do Nascimento	Brazil	26:54
112	Laura Umpierrez	Argentina	27:30
—	Erin McClure	Canada	DNF
—	Magdalena Haamwanyena	Namibia	DNF
—	Iris Fuentes-Pila	Spain	DNF
—	Eva Chollat-Traquet	France	DNF
—	Fanny Pruvost	France	DNF
—	Amber Gascoigne	United Kingdom	DNF
—	Kawthar Al-Wahsh	Palestine	DNF
—	Houria Riadi	Morocco	DNF
—	Rachel Hixson	United States	DNF
—	Nadia Ejjafini	Morocco	DQ^{†}

^{†}: Nadia Ejjafini of Morocco was the original 18th-place finisher in 20:43 min, but was disqualified for age falsification.

==== Teams ====
Rank	Team	Points
1st place, gold medalist(s)	Ethiopia: Yimenashu Taye / 1; Worknesh Kidane / 3; Alemgena Bezabeh / 4; Merima Hashim / 8; (Hareg Sidelil) / (16); (Tereza Yohanes) / (17)	16
2nd place, silver medalist(s)	Kenya: Jeruto Kiptum / 2; Vivian Cheruiyot / 5; Margaret Chepkemboi / 6; Agnes Kiprop / 7; (Prisca Ngetich) / (11); (Salome Boiyo) / (18)	20
3rd place, bronze medalist(s)	Japan: Emiko Kojima / 9; Yoshiko Fujinaga / 14; Risa Tanaka / 19; Miho Nakashima / 24; (Chioko Sakaue) / (29); (Kazuko Kanno) / (48)	66
4	South Africa: René Kalmer / 12; Elaine du Plessis / 25; Yolandi Neuhoff / 28; Catherine Maapela / 33; (Lize-Mari Venter) / (36); (Letitia Pheleu) / (67)	98^{†}
5	Morocco: Malika Asahssah / 13; Hind Chahid / 23; Soumia Mastacou / 32; Bouchra Benthami / 46; (Houria Riadi) / (DNF)	114^{†}
6	Finland: Tuula Laitinen / 21; Riina Tolonen / 42; Minna Myllykoski / 49; Minna Nummela / 53; (Johanna Raja-aho) / (63); (Eliisa Ahola) / (96)	165
7	United States: Melinda Campbell / 20; Laura Heiner / 45; Tara Rohatinsky / 51; Mariel Ettinger / 75; (Ann Ramsey) / (77); (Rachel Hixson) / (DNF)	191
8	Algeria: Lynda Rabhi / 37; Fouzia Zoutat / 52; Kenza Dahmani / 55; Nassira Taibi / 56; (Hakima Baatouche) / (80); (Khadija Touati) / (98)	200
9	Spain: Vanessa Veiga / 35; Elena Perez / 43; Natalia Rodríguez / 70; Marta Gómez / 71; (Rosa Morató) / (84); (Iris Fuentes-Pila) / (DNF)	219
10	Canada: Émilie Mondor / 10; Tara Struyk / 64; Desneiges McLean / 72; Sharolyn Shields / 74; (Malindi Elmore) / (93); (Erin McClure) / (DNF)	220
11	Germany: Sabrina Mockenhaupt / 38; Melanie Schulz / 59; Judith Heinze / 60; Gabi Kastner / 83; (Ulrike Leitheim) / (87); (Katharina Schley) / (95)	240
12	Italy: Federica Gogele / 40; Vincenza Sicari / 69; Luana Pocorobba / 73; Rosaria Console / 76; (Silvia Weissteiner) / (89); (Cristina Pozzo) / (97)	258
13	United Kingdom: Caroline Walsh / 50; Louise Kelly / 58; Karen Fletcher / 65; Rebecca Everett / 85; (Sonia Thomas) / (88); (Amber Gascoigne) / (DNF)	258
14	France: Kattell Villain / 44; Chantal Berthelot / 61; Céline Garcia / 92; Eugenie Gnoleba / 101; (Eva Chollat-Traquet) / (DNF); (Fanny Pruvost) / (DNF)	298
15	Rwanda: Christine Mukamutesi / 68; Epiphanie Nyirabarame / 79; Clemantine Nyiraguhirwa / 102; Enphasia Nyirangerageze / 106; (Francine Byukusenge) / (109)	355
16	Turkey: Türkan Erişmiş / 82; Ayfer Yigit / 91; Sümeyra Tali / 94; Nilgün Yilmaz / 103	370

- Note: Athletes in parentheses did not score for the team result

^{†}: Nadia Ejjafini of Morocco was the original 18th-place finisher in 20:43 min, but was disqualified for age falsification.

== Participation ==
An unofficial count yields the participation of 122 athletes from 35 countries in the Junior women's race. This is in agreement with the official numbers as published.

- Algeria (6)
- Argentina (3)
- Australia (1)
- Belarus (1)
- Belgium (1)
- Brazil (3)
- Canada (6)
- Croatia (3)
- Ethiopia (6)
- Finland (6)
- France (6)
- Germany (6)
- Hungary (1)
- Italy (6)
- Japan (6)
- Kazakhstan (1)
- Kenya (6)
- Lebanon (1)
- Mexico (1)
- Morocco (6)
- Namibia (1)
- New Zealand (1)
- Palestine (1)
- Portugal (1)
- Romania (1)
- Russia (1)
- Rwanda (5)
- South Africa (6)
- Spain (6)
- Turkey (4)
- Turkmenistan (2)
- United Kingdom (6)
- United States (6)
- FR Yugoslavia (2)
- Zimbabwe (3)

== See also ==
- 1998 IAAF World Cross Country Championships – Senior men's race
- 1998 IAAF World Cross Country Championships – Men's short race
- 1998 IAAF World Cross Country Championships – Junior men's race
- 1998 IAAF World Cross Country Championships – Senior women's race
- 1998 IAAF World Cross Country Championships – Women's short race
