= Kipkurui Misoi =

Kenyan runner

Kipkurui Misoi (born 23 October 1978 in Bomet) is a Kenyan retired long-distance runner who specialized in the 3000 metres steeplechase.

== Achievements ==
Year	Competition	Venue	Position	Event	Notes
Representing Kenya
1996	World Junior Championships	Sydney, Australia	2nd	3000 m st.	8:33.31
1998	World Cross Country Championships	Marrakesh, Morocco	8th	Short race (4 km)	11:10
1998	Commonwealth Games	Kuala Lumpur, Malaysia	3rd	3000 m st.	8:18.24
1999	All-Africa Games	Johannesburg, South Africa	1st	3000 m st.	8:32.42
1999	IAAF Grand Prix Final	Munich, Germany	4th	3000 m st.	8:11.36
2001	IAAF Grand Prix Final	Melbourne, Australia	4th	3000 m st.	8:19.01
2004	World Athletics Final	Monte Carlo, Monaco	4th	3000 m st.	8:12.99
2005	World Athletics Final	Monte Carlo, Monaco	8th	3000 m st.	8:21.01

=== Personal bests ===
- 1500 metres – 3:39.17 min (1998)
- 3000 metres – 7:40.93 min (2000)
- 5000 metres – 13:26.83 min (1998)
- 3000 metre steeplechase – 8:01.69 min (2001)
