= Paul Malakwen Kosgei =

Kenyan long-distance and marathon runner (born 1978)

Medal record

Men's athletics

Representing Kenya

World Cross Country Championships
Silver medal – second place	1999 Belfast	Short race
Bronze medal – third place	1998 Marrakesh	Short race
Bronze medal – third place	2000 Vilamoura	Short race

World Half Marathon Championships
Gold medal – first place	2002 Brussels	Half marathon

African Championships
Gold medal – first place	2002 Radès	10,000 m

Commonwealth Games
Silver medal – second place	2002 Manchester	10,000 m

Paul Malakwen Kosgei (born 22 April 1978, in Marakwet) is a Kenyan long-distance and marathon runner. He first came to prominence in athletics by taking the World Junior Record of 3000m steeple in 1997, and later with consecutive medals at the IAAF World Cross Country Championships from 1998 to 2000.

In 1999 he started his technical collaboration with the Italian Coach Renato Canova, that changed his event, looking at longer distances.

He made his debut at the IAAF World Half Marathon Championships in 2002 and became the surprise world champion for the event. Later that year he became the African champion on the track in the 10,000 metres and also won silver medals at the 2002 Commonwealth Games and 2002 IAAF World Cup.

He focused entirely on road running after 2002 and he broke the world record for the 25 km distance, running 1:12:45 in May 2004. His personal best over the half marathon (59:07 minutes), with which he won the 2006 Berlin Half Marathon, ranks him within the top ten fastest ever over the distance. He began to focus on marathon running and won his first race at the Maratona d'Italia in 2010 with a course record and personal best time of 2:09.00.

From 2009 there was a passage of coach, from Renato Canova to Gabriele Nicola, who is a student of the former coach.

== Career ==
=== Junior world record and first medals ===
Kosgei started his international career as a cross country runner and a steeplechaser. He came to prominence as a junior athlete in 1997 when he took the junior bronze medal at the 1997 IAAF World Cross Country Championships, and he also reached the 1997 IAAF Grand Prix Final for the 3000 metres steeplechase. He established his pedigree by setting a world junior record for the event.

He emerged as a senior the following year, taking the bronze in the short race at the 1998 IAAF World Cross Country Championships and helping Kenya to the team gold medal. He also led Kenya to a team victory at the IAAF World Road Relay Championships in Manaus in April. He was the fourth fastest athlete in the world that year in the steeplechase. He also began taking part in road running competitions and won the 10 km BOclassic race at the end of the year. He improved to the silver medal position at the 1999 IAAF World Cross Country Championships, finishing behind Paul Tergat to help Kenya to a consecutive team win. He represented his country on the track at the 1999 World Championships in Athletics in Seville, where he was seventh in the men's steeplechase. He closed his track season with a fifth-place finish at the 1999 IAAF Grand Prix Final.

=== African and World Champion ===
From 2000 onwards he later began concentrating on long-distance running and dropped his steeplechase speciality. He set a 10 km best of 27:40 to win the Parelloop race in Brunssum that year. He also took a third consecutive cross country medal at the 2000 IAAF World Cross Country Championships, continuing the streak of Kenya team victories with his bronze medal performance. He took road circuit wins in Europe at the Giro Podistico Internazionale di Pettinengo, winning the 9.5 km race in 27:03, and also at the Giro al Sas 10K in Trento. He ran for Kenya in the long race at the 2001 IAAF World Cross Country Championships but could not match his short course form and finished in fifth place. The greater distances also did not bring him medals at the 2001 World Championships in Athletics as he finished seventh in the 10,000 metres final. He was the winner of the 2001 Giro Media Blenio 10K race in Dongio, recording a time of 28:13.4.

The 2002 marked a significant breakthrough for Kosgei in both track and road running. In May, he led the Kenyan team to victory at the 2002 IAAF World Half Marathon Championships with a time of 1:00:39. He edged out Jaouad Gharib to win the race on his first attempt at the half marathon distance. His first time success did not make him an immediate convert, however: "I have changed my focus from the steeplechase to the 10,000 metres ... Maybe in two or three years I will start to think about running the marathon". Kosgei became the Kenyan champion over 10,000 m that summer, and his next test came at the 2002 Commonwealth Games in Manchester, England. He was entered into the 10,000 m race and was second behind his Kenyan compatriot Wilberforce Talel – Kosgei's finishing time of 27:45.46 was seven hundredths of a second behind Talel, who broke the Games record for the event.

He went unbeaten over the distance at the 2002 African Championships in Athletics the following month, beating John Cheruiyot Korir to the continental title. As African champion, he was selected to represent the continental at the 2002 IAAF World Cup. He took the 5000 metres silver medal behind the reigning European champion Alberto García (who was banned in 2003 for taking EPO). Among Kosgei's other honours that year was a silver medal from the World Military Track and Field Championships.

=== Road running world record ===
After a relatively quiet 2003, Kosgei again came to the fore by setting a world record for the 25 km road distance, winning the BIG 25 Berlin race in 1:12:45 on 9 May 2004 (a record which stood until 2010 when it was beaten by Samuel Kosgei at the same race).

Kosgei won the Berlin Half Marathon in 2006, setting a half marathon personal best of 59:07 minutes as well as bettering his marks over 15 km and 20 km along the way. He competed at the 2007 Hamburg Marathon and Amsterdam Marathon, finishing 14th and 10th, respectively. Kosgei was one of four men under an hour at the Rotterdam Half Marathon in 2008 and his time of 59:37 brought him fourth place. He took three consecutive wins at the Amatrice-Configno road race from 2008 to 2010, building upon his first win in 2003. He posted a personal record of 2:09:12 hours at the 2008 Paris Marathon, where he finished eighth.

He scored his first victory over the marathon distance at the Maratona d'Italia in October 2010, where he set a new course record of 2:09:00.

== Personal life ==
Kosgei is married and has two children. He is currently coached by Italian Gabriele Nicola.

== International competitions ==
Year	Competition	Venue	Position	Event	Notes
1997	World Cross Country Championships	Turin, Italy	3rd	Junior race	
1998	World Cross Country Championships	Marrakesh, Morocco	3rd	Short race	
1998	World Cross Country Championships	Marrakesh, Morocco	1st	Team short race	
1999	World Cross Country Championships	Belfast, United Kingdom	2nd	Short race	
1999	World Cross Country Championships	Belfast, United Kingdom	1st	Team short race	
1999	World Championships	Seville, Spain	7th	3,000 m steeple	
1999	Grand Prix Final	Munich, Germany	5th	3,000 m steeple	
2000	World Cross Country Championships	Vilamoura, Portugal	3rd	Short race	
2000	World Cross Country Championships	Vilamoura, Portugal	1st	Team short race	
2001	World Cross Country Championships	Ostend, Belgium	5th	Long race	
2001	World Cross Country Championships	Ostend, Belgium	1st	Team race	
2001	World Championships	Edmonton, Canada	7th	10,000 m	
2002	World Half Marathon Championships	Brussels, Belgium	1st	Half marathon	
2002	African Championships	Tunis, Tunisia	1st	10,000 m	
2002	Commonwealth Games	Manchester, United Kingdom	2nd	10,000 m	
2002	IAAF World Cup	Madrid, Spain	2nd	5,000 m	
