= Elarbi Khattabi =

Moroccan long-distance runner

Medal record

Men's athletics

Representing Morocco

World Road Relay Championships
Gold medal – first place	1994 Litochoro	Team

World Cross Country Championships
Silver medal – second place	1994 Budapest	Long race – Team
Silver medal – second place	1995 Durham	Long race – Team
Silver medal – second place	1997 Turin	Long race – Team
Bronze medal – third place	1998 Marrakesh	Long race – Team
Bronze medal – third place	2002 Dublin	Long race – Team

Elarbi Khattabi (Arabic: العربي خطابي; born 16 May 1967) is a Moroccan former long-distance runner who specialized in the 3000 metres steeplechase and cross-country running.

He was born in Casablanca. He is a 1994 world road relay champion with Moroccan team in Litochoro, Greece.

His achievements in the 3000 metres steeplechase on the global level are a tenth place at the 1992 Olympic Games, seventh place at the 1993 World Championships and fifth place at the 1993 IAAF Grand Prix Final, before he competed at the 1995 World Championships. He then finished eleventh at the 1995 Grand Prix Final, the 1997 World Championships and the 1999 World Championships. He then finished eighth at the 1999 Grand Prix Final, and competed at the 2000 Olympic Games and the 2001 World Championships without reaching the final. On the regional level he won the silver medal at the 1994 Jeux de la Francophonie and the gold medal at the 2001 Jeux de la Francophonie. With 8:16.63 minutes in 2001 he set a new championship record. He also finished fifth at the 2001 Mediterranean Games and fourth at the 2002 African Championships.

His personal best times were 7.43.06 minutes in the 3000 metres, achieved in July 1998 in Paris; 8.09.03 minutes in the 3000 metres steeplechase, achieved in July 1999 in Rome; and 13.18.92 minutes in the 5000 metres, achieved in June 1995 in Saint-Denis.

At the World Cross Country Championships he recorded many top placements. He finished fourteenth in 1994, eleventh in 1995, sixteenth in 1997, eleventh in 1998 and 27th in 2002. He won silver medals with the Moroccan team in the team competitions of 1994, 1995 and 1997, and bronze team medals in 1998 and 2002. The team silver in 1994 was the first team medal claimed by Morocco in this event.
