= Lotfi Turki =

Tunisian middle-distance runner

Personal information
- Nationality: Tunisian
- Born: 6 March 1975 (age 51)

Sport
- Sport: Middle-distance running
- Event: Steeplechase
Medal record
Men's athletics
Representing Tunisia
African Championships
Gold medal – first place	2000 Algiers	3000 m st.

Lotfi Turki (born 6 March 1975) is a Tunisian middle-distance runner. He competed in the men's 3000 metres steeplechase at the 2000 Summer Olympics.
