= Mourad Benslimani =

Algerian long-distance runner

Mourad Benslimani (born 19 February 1974) is a retired Algerian long-distance runner.

At the 1998 World Cross Country Championships he finished 36th in the short race. This earned him an eighth place in the team competition with the Algerian team. In the 3000 metres steeplechase he finished fourth at the 2001 Mediterranean Games and competed at the 2000 Olympic Games.

His personal best time was 8:22.9 minutes, achieved in June 2002 in Blida.
