= Manuel Silva (athlete) =

Portuguese middle-distance runner

Personal information
- Nationality: Portuguese
- Born: 8 October 1978 (age 47) Guimarães, Portugal
- Height: 1.79 m (5 ft 10 in)

Sport
- Sport: Middle-distance running
- Event: Steeplechase

Manuel Silva (born 8 October 1978) is a Portuguese middle-distance runner. He competed in the 3000 metres steeplechase at the 2000 Summer Olympics and the 2004 Summer Olympics.
