= Mohammed Awol =

Ethiopian runner

Mohammed Awol Ibrahim (born 1978 in Wollo) is an Ethiopian runner who specializes in cross-country running. In 2007 he won the Hartford Marathon.

== Achievements ==
Year	Competition	Venue	Position	Event	Notes
Representing Ethiopia
1998	World Cross Country Championships	Vilamoura, Portugal	13th	Long race	
1998	World Cross Country Championships	Vilamoura, Portugal	3rd	Team	
2002	World Cross Country Championships	Dublin, Ireland	13th	Long race	
2002	World Cross Country Championships	Dublin, Ireland	2nd	Team	
