= Laïd Bessou =

Algerian long-distance runner

Medal record

Men's athletics

Representing Algeria

African Championships
Silver medal – second place	2000 Algiers	3000 m st.

Laïd Bessou (born 5 February 1976) is an Algerian retired runner who specialized in the men's 3000 metres steeplechase. He competed in the men's 3000 metres steeplechase at the 2000 Summer Olympics.

== Achievements ==
Year	Tournament	Venue	Result	Extra
1998	World Cross Country Championships	Marrakesh, Morocco	25th	Short race
1998	World Cross Country Championships	Marrakesh, Morocco	8th	Team competition
1999	World Cross Country Championships	Belfast, United Kingdom	17th	Short race
1999	World Cross Country Championships	Belfast, United Kingdom	5th	Team competition
2000	World Cross Country Championships	Vilamoura, Portugal	9th	Short race
2000	World Cross Country Championships	Vilamoura, Portugal	4th	Team competition
2000	Olympic Games	Sydney, Australia	11th	3000 m st.
2000	African Championships	Algiers, Algeria	2nd	3000 m st.

=== Personal bests ===
- 1500 metres – 3:38.79 min (2000)
- 3000 metres steeplechase – 8:10.23 min (2000) NR
