= Abraham Cherono =

Kenyan runner

Abraham Cherono (born 21 July 1980 in Keiyo District) is a Kenyan runner who specializes in the 3000 metres steeplechase and cross-country running.

He is the older brother of Stephen Cherono, who moved to Qatar and changed his name to Saif Saaeed Shaheen.

== Achievements ==
Year	Competition	Venue	Position	Event	Notes
Representing Kenya
1998	World Junior Championships	Annecy, France	2nd	3000m steeplechase	8:32.24
2000	World Cross Country Championships	Vilamoura, Portugal	11th	Long race (12.3 km)	36:00
2000	World Cross Country Championships	Vilamoura, Portugal	1st	Team competition	18 pts
2002	Commonwealth Games	Manchester, United Kingdom	3rd	3000m steeplechase	8:19.85
2003	World Cross Country Championships	Lausanne, Switzerland	12th	Long race (12.355 km)	37:17
2003	World Cross Country Championships	Lausanne, Switzerland	1st	Team competition	17 pts
2003	World Championships	Paris, France	5th	3000m steeplechase	8:13.37
2003	Military World Games	Catania, Italy	3rd	3000m steeplechase	8:45.36
2003	World Athletics Final	Monte Carlo, Monaco	10th	3000m steeplechase	8:35.67

2nd to Paul Tergat in Kenya world cross country trials 2000

=== Personal bests ===
- 3000 meters – 7:41.17 (2000)
- 5000 meters – 13:15.7 (2000)
- 3000 meters steeplechase – 8:10.33 (2003)
