= Christian Belz =

Swiss long-distance runner (born 1974)

Personal information
- Born: 11 September 1974 (age 52) Zurich, Switzerland

Sport
- Sport: Track and field
Medal record
Representing Switzerland
Summer Universiade
Bronze medal – third place	2001 Beijing	3000 m steeplechase
Bronze medal – third place	2001 Beijing	5000 m

Christian Belz (born 11 September 1974) is a Swiss long-distance runner. He was initially a steeplechaser and represented Switzerland in the event at the World Championships in Athletics in 1999 and 2001 as well as the 2000 Summer Olympics. He broke the national record with a run of 8:22.24 in June 2001. Later that year he won two bronze medals at the 2001 Summer Universiade.

He began to focus on the 5000 metres instead and was one of two Europeans to make the world final at the 2003 World Championships. He was eliminated in the heats at the 2004 Athens Olympics, but broke another Swiss record at the 2005 World Championships, running 27:53.16 in the 10,000 metres. He was fourth at the 2006 European Athletics Championships.

A switch to road running was hindered by injury throughout 2007 to 2009. He made his final major appearance at the 2010 European Athletics Championships and announced his international retirement at the end of that year.

== Career ==
=== Steeplechaser ===
Born in Zürich, he started his career in athletics as a specialist in the 3000 metres steeplechase. He earned All-American honours competing for the Washington Huskies while studying at the University of Washington. It was in the steeplechase that he made his first international appearances for Switzerland. He was selected for the 1999 World Championships in Athletics and finished eighth in his heat. He made his Olympic debut the following year at the 2000 Sydney Olympics and was again knocked out in the heats after an eighth place finish.

The 2001 season marked an improvement in his performances: he set a personal best and Swiss record in the steeplechase with a time of 8:22.24 at the FBK Games in Hengelo in July. He made a global final for the first time at the 2001 World Championships and finished in thirteenth place with a time of 8:31.43. A month later he competed at the 2001 Summer Universiade and had his first international podium finish, taking the bronze medals in both the steeplechase and 5000 metres. At the end of the year he participated at the 2001 European Cross Country Championships, held on home turf in Thun, and he took fifth place in a field of 77 runners.

=== Switch to flat running ===
He began to expand his event repertoire and doubled up in the steeplechase and 5000 metres races at the 2002 European Athletics Championships. He failed to reach the steeplechase final but managed twelfth in the 5000 m event final. He began to focus on running the flat distances thereafter. He made his world cross country running debut in 2003, finishing in eighteenth place in the short race at the 2003 IAAF World Cross Country Championships. He was the best Swiss performer at the event, heading the national team (including Viktor Röthlin) to seventh in the rankings. He was also chosen for the 2003 World Championships and reached the final of the 5000 m. He ended up in 13th place, but he was one of only two Europeans in the world final, alongside Juan Carlos de la Ossa of Spain. He also ran in the event at the 2004 Athens Olympics, but did not make it past the heats stage on his second Olympic appearance.

He competed at the 2005 IAAF World Cross Country Championships and was 28th in the short race. He had greater success on the track by winning the gold medal over 3000 metres at the 2005 European Cup. He elected to run the 10,000 metres at the 2005 World Championships and broke Markus Ryffel's long-standing national record with a run of 27:53.16 for fourteenth place. The following year he retained his 3000 m title at the 2006 European Cup and came close to a 10,000 m medal at the 2006 European Athletics Championships, where he finished in fourth place. He closed the year with a top ten finish at the 2006 European Cross Country Championships.

=== Road and retirement ===
He began to change his focus to road running in 2007. He set a course record of 31:08 at the Reusslauf in Bremgarten that February. He made his half marathon debut at the Rotterdam Half Marathon and stepped up to the full marathon distance in October, running at the Cologne Marathon, which he finished in a time of 2:15:08. A series of injuries affected his running from 2007 to 2009. He returned his focus to the track and reached the 10,000 m final at the 2010 European Athletics Championships in Barcelona, finishing in sixth place.

Belz announced his retirement from international competition at the end of 2010, citing his desire to focus on both his family and his work as a specialist in sports economics. He is married to Anita Brägger, another Swiss Olympic runner.

== Personal bests ==
Surface	Event	Time (h:m:s)	Venue	Date
Track	3000 m steeplechase	8:22.24 NR	Hengelo, Netherlands	4 June 2001
Track	3000 m	7:50.65	Cottbus, Germany	5 June 2005
Track	5000 m	13:12.16	Heusden-Zolder, Netherlands	2 August 2003
Track	10,000 m	27:53.16 NR	Helsinki, Finland	8 August 2005
Road	Half marathon	1:03:43	Rotterdam, Netherlands	9 September 2007
Road	Marathon	2:15:08	Cologne, Germany	7 October 2007

- All information taken from IAAF profile.

== Achievements ==
Year	Competition	Venue	Position	Notes
Representing Switzerland
2001	Summer Universiade	Beijing, PR China	3rd	5000 m
2001	Summer Universiade	Beijing, PR China	3rd	3000m steeplechase
