= Reuben Kosgei =

Kenyan track and field athlete

Medal record

Men's athletics

Representing Kenya

Olympic Games
Gold medal – first place	2000 Sydney	3000 m steeplechase

World Championships
Gold medal – first place	2001 Edmonton	3000 m steeplechase

Commonwealth Games
Bronze medal – third place	2006 Melbourne	3000 m steeplechase

Reuben Seroney Kosgei (born 2 August 1979 in Kapcherop, Kenya), is a middle and long distance athlete most famous for 3000 m steeplechase in which he became the youngest ever winner of an Olympic gold medal in the event, when, at the age of 21, he ran to victory in Sydney 2000 with a winning time of 8 minutes 21.43 seconds.

At the 2006 Commonwealth Games he won a bronze medal in the steeplechase race.

He made his marathon debut at the 2009 Vienna Marathon, but did not finish the race. He finished 2nd at the 2009 Florence Marathon

A regular visitor to Australia, Kosgei won the 2009 Sydney Morning Herald Half Marathon in 64:18 and returned in 2010 to place 3rd in Perth's City to Surf Marathon. He won the 2011 Perth City to Surf 12 km event, the 2011 Bridge to Brisbane fun run, the 2011 Athletics Victoria Half Marathon Championship, the 2011 Adelaide City-Bay fun run and most recently, came second in the 2015 Adelaide City-Bay fun run. As of 2013, Kosgei intends on making Australia his home.

== Major achievements ==
(all 3000 m steeplechase)

- 2000
  - 2000 Summer Olympics – Sydney, Australia
    - gold medal
- 1998
  - 1998 IAAF World Junior Championships – Annecy, France
    - gold medal
- 2001
  - 2001 World Championships in Athletics – Edmonton, Canada
    - gold medal
  - Goodwill Games – Brisbane, Australia
    - silver medal
