= Giuseppe Maffei =

Italian middle-distance runner

Personal information
- Nationality: Italian
- Born: 28 January 1974 (age 52) Varese, Italy
- Height: 1.83 m (6 ft 0 in)
- Weight: 64 kg (141 lb)

Sport
- Country: Italy
- Sport: Athletics
- Events: Middle distance running 3000 metres steeplechase
- Club: Libertas Centro Torri PV

Achievements and titles
- Personal best: 3000 m st: 8:11.85 (1999)
Medal record
Mediterranean Games
Bronze medal – third place	1997 Bari	3000 m st
Universiade
Gold medal – first place	1999 Palma de Mallorca	3000 m st

Giuseppe Maffei (born 28 January 1974) is an Italian former middle distance runner, mainly specialized in 3000 metres steeplechase

He won two medals at the International athletics competitions.

== Biography ==
He competed in the 2000 Summer Olympics and in the 2004 Summer Olympics, he has 12 caps in national team from 1995 to 2004.

== National titles ==
Giuseppe Maffei has won one time the individual national championship.

- 1 win in 3000 metres steeplechase (2001)

== See also ==
- Italian all-time lists - 3000 metres steeplechase
