= Bernard Barmasai =

Kenyan athlete (born 1974)

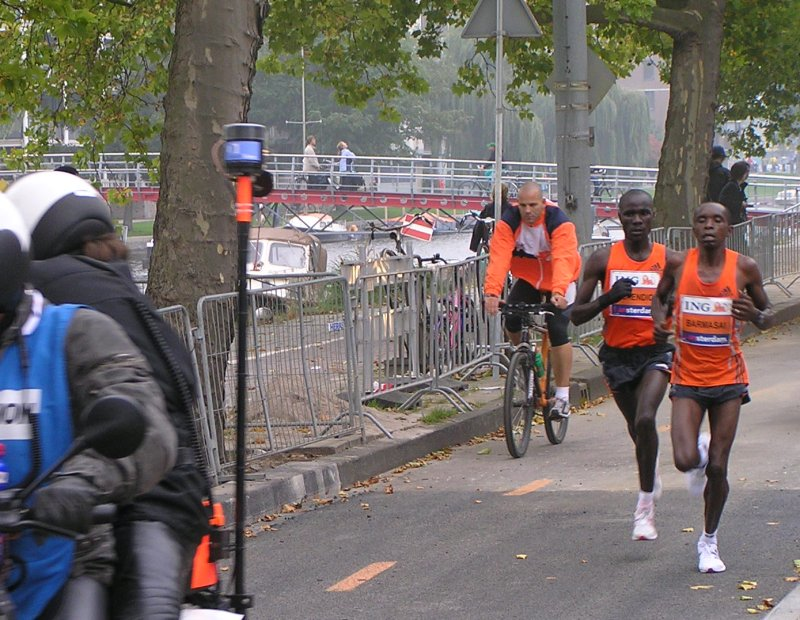

Medal record

Men's athletics

Representing Kenya

African Championships
Gold medal – first place	1998 Dakar	3000 m st.

Bernard Barmasai (born 6 May 1974 in Keiyo) is an athlete from Kenya. He specialised in steeplechase running but is nowadays a marathoner.

He set the new 3000 metres steeplechase world record of 7:55.72 on 24 August 1997 in Cologne. The record was broken by Brahim Boulami from Morocco in 2001. The time survived as a Kenyan Record until July 2011, when Brimin Kipruto ran a new African Record time of 7:53.64.

Barmasai won the Eurocross in 1997, before going on to win the team gold with Kenya at that year's IAAF World Cross Country Championships.

Barmasai suffered from knee injuries and was mostly sidelined in 2002 and 2003. This prompted him to quit steeplechase and switch to marathons.

== Achievements ==
Year	Competition	Venue	Position	Event	Notes
Representing Kenya
1995	All-Africa Games	Harare, Zimbabwe	1st	3000 m st	
1997	World Cross Country Championships	Turin, Italy	6th	Long race	
1997	World Cross Country Championships	Turin, Italy	1st	Team	
1997	World Championships	Athens, Greece	3rd	3000 m st	
1997	IAAF Grand Prix Final	Fukuoka, Japan	3rd	3000 m st	
1998	Commonwealth Games	Kuala Lumpur, Malaysia	2nd	3000 m st	
1998	Goodwill Games	New York, United States	1st	3000 m st	
1998	African Championships	Dakar, Senegal	1st	3000 m st	
1998	IAAF World Cup	Johannesburg, South Africa	2nd	3000 m st	
1999	IAAF Grand Prix Final	Munich, Germany	1st	3000 m st	
2000	Summer Olympics	Sydney, Australia	4th	3000 m st	
2001	World Championships	Edmonton, Canada	3rd	3000 m st	

=== Marathons ===
- 2004 - Rotterdam Marathon, 15th (marathon debut)
- 2005 - Amsterdam Marathon, 4th
- 2006 - Paris Marathon, 3rd
- 2006 - Amsterdam Marathon, 2nd

Records
Preceded by (Kenya) Wilson Boit Kipketer	Men's Steeplechase World Record Holder; 24 August 1997 – 24 August 2001	Succeeded by (Morocco) Brahim Boulami
Sporting positions
Preceded by (Kenya) John Kosgei	Men's 3,000 m Steeple Best Year Performance; 1997 – 2000	Succeeded by (Morocco) Brahim Boulami
