= Luis Miguel Martín =

Spanish long-distance runner

Medal record

Men's athletics

Representing Spain

European Championships
Bronze medal – third place	2002 Munich	3000 m st.

Luis Miguel Martín Berlanas (born 11 January 1972 in Madrid) is a former Spanish long-distance runner. He specializes in the 3000 metres steeplechase. He took up the event in 1998. He is a vegetarian since 1996. Since September 2015 he is the head coach of Nike Run Club Madrid.

== Achievements ==
Year	Competition	Venue	Position	Notes
Representing Spain
1990	World Junior Championships	Plovdiv, Bulgaria	12th	1500 m
1998	European Championships	Budapest, Hungary	4th	3000 m st.
2000	Olympic Games	Sydney, Australia	5th	3000 m st.
2001	World Championships	Edmonton, Canada	4th	3000 m st.
2002	European Championships	Munich, Germany	3rd	3000 m st.
	World Cup	Madrid, Spain	2nd	3000 m st.
2003	World Championships	Paris, France	6th	3000 m st.
	World Athletics Final	Monte Carlo, Monaco	8th	3000 m st.
2004	Olympic Games	Athens, Greece	5th	3000 m st.
	World Athletics Final	Monte Carlo, Monaco	10th	3000 m st.
2005	World Championships	Helsinki, Finland	11th	3000 m st.
2006	World Athletics Final	Stuttgart, Germany	7th	3000 m st.

=== Personal bests ===
- 1500 metres - 3:36.11 min (2002)
- 3000 metres - 7:50.27 min (2000)
- 5000 metres - 13:54.35 min (2002)
- 3000 metres steeplechase - 8:07.44 min (2002)
