= Rafał Wójcik =

Polish long-distance runner (1972–2025)

Rafał Wójcik (18 September 1972 – 30 October 2025) was a Polish long-distance runner born in Starachowice.

Up to 2004 he specialized in the 3000 metres steeplechase. He finished eighth at the 2002 European Championships and competed without reaching the final at the 1997 and 1999 World Championships as well as the 2000 Summer Olympics.

Beginning in 2005, he concentrated on the marathon race where he finished sixteenth at the 2005 World Championships and twelfth at the 2006 European Championships.

Wójcik died on 30 October 2025, at the age of 53.

== Personal bests ==
- 1500 metres – 3:42.84 min (2000)
- 3000 metres – 7:57.28 min (2004)
- 3000 metres steeplechase – 8:17.09 min (2000)
- 5000 metres – 13:49.29 min (1998)
- 10,000 metres – 29:06.16 min (2005)
- Half marathon – 1:03:54 (2007)
- Marathon – 2:13:02 (2008)
