= John Kosgei =

Kenyan steeplechase runner

Medal record

Men's athletics

Representing Kenya

Commonwealth Games
| Gold medal – first place | Kuala Lumpur | 3000 m steeplechase |

John Kosgei (born 15 July 1973) is a Kenyan athlete who specializes in middle- and long-distance running. He won the gold medal in the 3000 metres steeplechase at the 1998 Commonwealth Games in Kuala Lumpur, Malaysia.
