= Brahim Boulami =

Moroccan athlete (born 1972)

Personal information
- Born: April 20, 1972 (age 54) Safi, Morocco

Sport
- Sport: Track and field
Medal record
Representing Morocco
African Championships
Gold medal – first place	2002 Radès	3000 m steeplechase
Bronze medal – third place	1998 Dakar	3000 m steeplechase
Mediterranean Games
Gold medal – first place	1997 Bari	3000 m steeplechase
Gold medal – first place	2005 Almería	3000 m steeplechase
Summer Universiade
Silver medal – second place	1995 Fukuoka	5000 m
Bronze medal – third place	1995 Fukuoka	3000 m steeplechase

Brahim Boulami (Arabic: ابراهيم بولامي; born April 20, 1972) is a Moroccan athlete who set two world records in the 3,000 meter steeplechase, 7:55.28 and 7:53.17. The latter was overturned because he tested positive for the banned performance-enhancing drug EPO. Boulami was banned for two years in 2002 after the positive test. His time of 7:55.28 in the 3000 meter steeplechase from the year before the positive test is currently the fourth fastest ever run.

His older brother Khalid Boulami is an Olympic bronze medalist.

== See also ==
- List of sportspeople sanctioned for doping offences

Records
Preceded by (Kenya) Bernard Barmasai	Men's 3,000 m Steeplechase World Record Holder; August 24, 2001 — September 3, 2004	Succeeded by (Qatar) Saif Saaeed Shaheen
Sporting positions
Preceded by (Kenya) Bernard Barmasai	Men's 3,000 m Steeple Best Year Performance; 2001 — 2002	Succeeded by (Qatar) Saif Saeed Shaheen
