= Maru Daba =

Ethiopian long-distance runner

Maru Daba (born 12 December 1980) is an Ethiopian retired long-distance runner, who specialized in the 3000 metres steeplechase. He represented Ethiopia at the 2000 Sydney Olympics and at the 1999 World Championships in Athletics.

His personal best time is 8:25.04 minutes, achieved in June 2003 in Rennes.

At the 1998 IAAF World Cross Country Championships in Marrakesh, Daba finished tenth in the short race and won a bronze medal with the Ethiopian team.
