= Wilson Boit Kipketer =

Kenyan middle-distance runner

Medal record

Men's athletics

Representing Kenya

Olympic Games
Silver medal – second place	2000 Sydney	3000 m st.

World Championships
Gold medal – first place	1997 Athens	3000 m st.
Silver medal – second place	1999 Seville	3000 m st.

African Championships
Silver medal – second place	2002 Radès	3000 m st.

Wilson Boit Kipketer (born 6 October 1973 in Kenya) is a middle and long distance athlete most widely known for running the 3000 m steeplechase. On 13 August 1997, at the Weltklasse Zürich, he set the world record in the steeplechase at 7:59.08, the third of three world records set in a 70-minute period of time. He was second individual after Moses Kiptanui to run under eight minutes. Boit Kipketer's record only stood for 11 days before it was crushed by Bernard Barmasai who took almost 3 1/2 seconds off the mark. A week earlier, Boit Kipketer led a Kenyan sweep of the same race in the 1997 World Championships, edging out Barmasai and then world record holder, three-time defending champion Kiptanui. He came back two years later to claim a silver medal in the 1999 World Championships and the following year in the 2000 Olympics.

He was born into a large family, one of twelve children.

In 2003, during an immigration clampdown by the Swedish authorities, Boit Kipketer was refused permission to run in Stockholm where the event organisers had lined him up as one of the main attractions, because he did not have the required visa.

He planned to debut in marathon at the Düsseldorf Marathon on 6 May 2007.

He is not related to Wilson Kipketer, the 800 m runner who represented Denmark and was also part of the three world records set in 70 minutes in Zurich. Both attended St. Patrick's High School at the same time.

== Politics ==
After his competitive career, Kipketer went into local politics as a member of the county assembly of the Kabiemit Ward.

== Major achievements ==
(3000 m steeplechase)

- 1997
  - 1997 World Championships in Athletics - Athens, Greece.
    - gold medal
  - World Record - Zürich, Switzerland
    - 7 minutes 59.08 seconds
- 1999
  - 1999 World Championships in Athletics - Seville, Spain
    - silver medal
  - 1999 All-Africa Games - Johannesburg, South Africa.
    - silver medal
- 2000
  - 2000 Summer Olympics - Sydney, Australia.
    - silver medal
- 2002
  - 2002 IAAF World Cup
    - gold medal
  - 2002 African Championships - Tunis, Tunisia.
    - silver medal

Records
Preceded by Moses Kiptanui	Men's steeplechase world record holder 13–24 August 1997	Succeeded by Bernard Barmasai
