= 1997 IAAF World Cross Country Championships – Senior women's race =

Senior women's race at the 1997 IAAF World Cross Country Championships
- Organisers: IAAF
- Edition: 25th
- Date: March 23
- Host city: Turin, Italy
- Venue: Parco del Valentino
- Events: 1
- Distances: 6.6 km – Senior women
- Participation: 147 athletes from 42 nations

The Senior women's race at the 1997 IAAF World Cross Country Championships was held in Turin, Italy, at the Parco del Valentino on March 23, 1997. A report on the event was given in The New York Times, in the Herald, and for the IAAF.

Complete results, medallists, and the results of British athletes were published.

== Race results ==
=== Senior women's race (6.6 km) ===
==== Individual ====
Rank	Athlete	Country	Time
1st place, gold medalist(s)	Derartu Tulu	Ethiopia	20:53
2nd place, silver medalist(s)	Paula Radcliffe	United Kingdom	20:55
3rd place, bronze medalist(s)	Gete Wami	Ethiopia	21:00
4	Julia Vaquero	Spain	21:01
5	Sally Barsosio	Kenya	21:05
6	Merima Denboba	Ethiopia	21:18
7	Catherina McKiernan	Ireland	21:20
8	Naomi Mugo	Kenya	21:23
9	Sonia O'Sullivan	Ireland	21:25
10	Jane Omoro	Kenya	21:29
11	Lydia Cheromei	Kenya	21:34
12	Elena Fidatof	Romania	21:35
13	Florence Barsosio	Kenya	21:36
14	Berhane Adere	Ethiopia	21:37
15	Annemari Sandell	Finland	21:38
16	Azumi Miyazaki	Japan	21:43
17	Chiemi Takahashi	Japan	21:45
18	Lucy Elliott	United Kingdom	21:45
19	Susan Chepkemei	Kenya	21:46
20	Nadia Dandolo	Italy	21:48
21	Kylie Risk	Australia	21:52
22	Hayley Haining	United Kingdom	21:53
23	Valerie Vaughan	Ireland	21:55
24	Laurence Vivier	France	21:55
25	Una English	Ireland	21:59
26	Amy Rudolph	United States	22:00
27	Getenesh Urge	Ethiopia	22:01
28	Laurence Duquénoy	France	22:01
29	Deena Drossin	United States	22:02
30	Miki Kitashima	Japan	22:02
31	Maria Curatolo	Italy	22:03
32	Lyudmila Petrova	Russia	22:04
33	Kathy Butler	Canada	22:07
34	Farida Fatès	France	22:07
35	Elva Dryer	United States	22:09
36	Marina Bastos	Portugal	22:09
37	Hiromi Masuda	Japan	22:10
38	Gwyn Coogan	United States	22:10
39	Conceição Ferreira	Portugal	22:10
40	Yelena Kaledina	Russia	22:11
41	Wei Li	China	22:11
42	Anastasiya Danchinova	Russia	22:12
43	Nora Rocha	Mexico	22:12
44	Kristin Beaney	United States	22:12
45	Sachie Ozaki	Japan	22:13
46	Valentina Tauceri	Italy	22:14
47	Teresa Nunes	Portugal	22:16
48	Stela Olteanu	Romania	22:17
49	Rocío Ríos	Spain	22:18
50	Nnenna Lynch	United States	22:19
51	Olivera Jevtić	FR Yugoslavia	22:19
52	Yelena Baranova	Russia	22:20
53	Anja Smolders	Belgium	22:21
54	Kore Alemu	Ethiopia	22:21
55	Anne Hare	New Zealand	22:22
56	Angela Davies	United Kingdom	22:23
57	Melissa Moon	New Zealand	22:25
58	Mariana Chirila	Romania	22:25
59	Li Meihua	China	22:26
60	Ana Correia	Portugal	22:28
61	Gabrielle Vijverberg	Netherlands	22:29
62	Yamna Oubouhou	France	22:30
63	Patrizia di Napoli	Italy	22:31
64	Galina Aleksandrova	Russia	22:31
65	Rkia Yajjou	France	22:36
66	Ana Elias	Angola	22:38
67	Alta Verster	South Africa	22:39
68	Helena Javornik	Slovenia	22:40
69	Sabrina Varrone	Italy	22:40
70	Annemarie Danneels	Belgium	22:40
71	Cristina Iloc	Romania	22:41
72	Linden Wilde	New Zealand	22:41
73	Chantal Dällenbach	France	22:42
74	Samukeliso Moyo	Zimbabwe	22:42
75	Liu Shixiang	China	22:42
76	Natalia Azpiazu	Spain	22:43
77	Tina Connelly	Canada	22:44
78	Ana Oliveira	Portugal	22:45
79	Elizabeth Miller	Australia	22:46
80	Maria Luisa Lárraga	Spain	22:46
81	Takami Ominami	Japan	22:48
82	Anikó Javos	Hungary	22:48
83	Manuela Dias	Portugal	22:49
84	Viorica Ghican	Romania	22:50
85	Yelena Kopytova	Russia	22:51
86	Zola Pieterse	South Africa	22:53
87	Amaia Piedra	Spain	22:55
88	Erica van der Bilt	Netherlands	22:58
89	Hao Jianhua	China	22:58
90	Maryann Murray	Australia	23:00
91	Nelly Glauser	Switzerland	23:01
92	Sonja Deckers	Belgium	23:04
93	Sarah Howell	Canada	23:04
94	Iulia Ionescu	Romania	23:05
95	Beatriz Santíago	Spain	23:06
96	Suzanne Rigg	United Kingdom	23:07
97	Rizoneide Vanderley	Brazil	23:08
98	Mieke Aanen	Netherlands	23:11
99	Lesley Morton	New Zealand	23:12
100	Olga Sheleva	Bulgaria	23:14
101	Magdalena Thorsell	Sweden	23:14
102	Nasria Baghdad	Algeria	23:19
103	Anikó Kálovics	Hungary	23:20
104	Andrea Whitcombe	United Kingdom	23:23
105	Charné Rademeyer	South Africa	23:26
106	Helána Barócsi	Hungary	23:27
107	Sandra Hofmans	Netherlands	23:28
108	Maureen Harrington	Ireland	23:36
109	Stephanie van Graan	South Africa	23:42
110	Flor Venegas	Chile	23:42
111	Maree Bunce	New Zealand	23:45
112	Lale Öztürk	Turkey	23:46
113	Nadir de Siqueira	Brazil	23:48
114	Mundan Anickal Molly	India	23:51
115	Sue Malaxos	Australia	23:53
116	Dalila Tahi	Algeria	23:54
117	Pauline Curley	Ireland	23:55
118	Natalia Melnik	Ukraine	23:56
119	Veerle Dejaeghere	Belgium	24:00
120	Mardrea Hyman	Jamaica	24:03
121	Hasibe Cangir	Turkey	24:07
122	Anchen Rose	South Africa	24:07
123	Karla Guerrero	Mexico	24:09
124	Maria Santana	Brazil	24:10
125	Noemi Morales	Mexico	24:17
126	Dolores Valencia	Mexico	24:19
127	Rani Saini	India	24:19
128	Ildikó Csendes	Hungary	24:21
129	Leontina Cespedes	Chile	24:26
130	Sarah Horan	New Zealand	24:28
131	Vijaya Sonwane	India	24:36
132	Gülsen Asikoglu	Turkey	24:37
133	Berenice Meira	Brazil	24:37
134	Nili Avramski	Israel	24:41
135	Susana Rebolledo	Chile	24:47
136	Madhuri Saxena	India	24:52
137	Dudu Mese	Turkey	24:56
138	Julia del Rio	Chile	25:05
139	Janice Turner	Jamaica	25:12
140	Georgina Fourie	South Africa	25:21
141	Monica Randi	San Marino	25:32
142	Ivancica Drugcevic	Croatia	25:36
143	Ida Kiyindou	Congo	25:39
144	Guylsara Dadabayeva	Tajikistan	26:24
145	Guylene Duval	Mauritius	28:22
—	Anita Weyermann	Switzerland	DNF
—	Agata Balsamo	Italy	DNF
—	Virginie Gloum	Central African Republic	DNS

==== Teams ====
Rank	Team	Points
1st place, gold medalist(s)	Ethiopia: Derartu Tulu / 1; Gete Wami / 3; Merima Denboba / 6; Berhane Adere / 14; (Getenesh Urge) / (27); (Kore Alemu) / (54)	24
2nd place, silver medalist(s)	Kenya: Sally Barsosio / 5; Naomi Mugo / 8; Jane Omoro / 10; Lydia Cheromei / 11; (Florence Barsosio) / (13); (Susan Chepkemei) / (19)	34
3rd place, bronze medalist(s)	Ireland: Catherina McKiernan / 7; Sonia O'Sullivan / 9; Valerie Vaughan / 23; Una English / 25; (Maureen Harrington) / (108); (Pauline Curley) / (117)	64
4	United Kingdom: Paula Radcliffe / 2; Lucy Elliott / 18; Hayley Haining / 22; Angela Davies / 56; (Suzanne Rigg) / (96); (Andrea Whitcombe) / (104)	98
5	Japan: Azumi Miyazaki / 16; Chiemi Takahashi / 17; Miki Kitashima / 30; Hiromi Masuda / 37; (Sachie Ozaki) / (45); (Takami Ominami) / (81)	100
6	United States: Amy Rudolph / 26; Deena Drossin / 29; Elva Dryer / 35; Gwynn Coogan / 38; (Kristin Beaney) / (44); (Nnenna Lynch) / (50)	128
7	France: Laurence Vivier / 24; Laurence Duquénoy / 28; Farida Fatès / 34; Yamna Oubouhou / 62; (Rkia Yajjou) / (65); (Chantal Dällenbach) / (73)	148
8	Italy: Nadia Dandolo / 20; Maria Curatolo / 31; Valentina Tauceri / 46; Patrizia di Napoli / 63; (Sabrina Varrone) / (69); (Agata Balsamo) / (DNF)	160
9	Russia: Lyudmila Petrova / 32; Yelena Kaledina / 40; Anastasiya Danchinova / 42; Yelena Baranova / 52; (Galina Aleksandrova) / (64); (Yelena Kopytova) / (85)	166
10	Portugal: Marina Bastos / 36; Conceição Ferreira / 39; Teresa Nunes / 47; Ana Correia / 60; (Ana Oliveira) / (78); (Manuela Dias) / (83)	182
11	Romania: Elena Fidatof / 12; Stela Olteanu / 48; Mariana Chirila / 58; Cristina Iloc / 71; (Viorica Ghican) / (84); (Iulia Ionescu) / (94)	189
12	Spain: Julia Vaquero / 4; Rocío Ríos / 49; Natalia Azpiazu / 76; Maria Luisa Lárraga / 80; (Amaia Piedra) / (87); (Beatriz Santíago) / (95)	209
13	China: Wei Li / 41; Li Meihua / 59; Liu Shixiang / 75; Hao Jianhua / 89	264
14	New Zealand: Anne Hare / 55; Melissa Moon / 57; Linden Wilde / 72; Lesley Morton / 99; (Maree Bunce) / (111); (Sarah Horan) / (130)	283
15	Australia: Kylie Risk / 21; Elizabeth Miller / 79; Maryann Murray / 90; Sue Malaxos / 115	305
16	Belgium: Anja Smolders / 53; Annemarie Danneels / 70; Sonja Deckers / 92; Veerle Dejaeghere / 119	334
17	Netherlands: Gabrielle Vijverberg / 61; Erica van der Bilt / 88; Mieke Aanen / 98; Sandra Hofmans / 107	354
18	South Africa: Alta Verster / 67; Zola Pieterse / 86; Charné Rademeyer / 105; Stephanie van Graan / 109; (Anchen Rose) / (122); (Georgina Fourie) / (140)	367
19	Mexico: Nora Rocha / 43; Karla Guerrero / 123; Noemi Morales / 125; Dolores Valencia / 126	417
20	Hungary: Anikó Javos / 82; Anikó Kálovics / 103; Helána Barócsi / 106; Ildikó Csendes / 128	419
21	Brazil: Rizoneide Vanderley / 97; Nadir de Siqueira / 113; Maria Santana / 124; Berenice Meira / 133	467
22	Turkey: Lale Öztürk / 112; Hasibe Cangir / 121; Gülsen Asikoglu / 132; Dudu Mese / 137	502
23	India: Mundan Anickal Molly / 114; Rani Saini / 127; Vijaya Sonwane / 131; Madhuri Saxena / 136	508
24	Chile: Flor Venegas / 110; Leontina Cespedes / 129; Susana Rebolledo / 135; Julia del Rio / 138	512

- Note: Athletes in parentheses did not score for the team result

== Participation ==
An unofficial count yields the participation of 147 athletes from 42 countries in the Senior women's race. This is in agreement with the official numbers as published. Although announced, the athlete from the Central African Republic did not show.

- Algeria (2)
- Angola (1)
- Australia (4)
- Belgium (4)
- Brazil (4)
- Bulgaria (1)
- Canada (3)
- Chile (4)
- China (4)
- Congo (1)
- Croatia (1)
- Ethiopia (6)
- Finland (1)
- France (6)
- Hungary (4)
- India (4)
- Ireland (6)
- Israel (1)
- Italy (6)
- Jamaica (2)
- Japan (6)
- Kenya (6)
- Mauritius (1)
- Mexico (4)
- Netherlands (4)
- New Zealand (6)
- Portugal (6)
- Romania (6)
- Russia (6)
- San Marino (1)
- Slovenia (1)
- South Africa (6)
- Spain (6)
- Sweden (1)
- Switzerland (2)
- Tajikistan (1)
- Turkey (4)
- Ukraine (1)
- United Kingdom (6)
- United States (6)
- FR Yugoslavia (1)
- Zimbabwe (1)

== See also ==
- 1997 IAAF World Cross Country Championships – Senior men's race
- 1997 IAAF World Cross Country Championships – Junior men's race
- 1997 IAAF World Cross Country Championships – Junior women's race
