= 1997 IAAF World Cross Country Championships – Junior women's race =

Junior women's race at the 1997 IAAF World Cross Country Championships
- Organisers: IAAF
- Edition: 25th
- Date: March 23
- Host city: Turin, Italy
- Venue: Parco del Valentino
- Events: 1
- Distances: 4.689 km – Junior women
- Participation: 138 athletes from 39 nations

The Junior women's race at the 1997 IAAF World Cross Country Championships was held in Turin, Italy, at the Parco del Valentino on March 23, 1997. A report on the event was given in The New York Times in the Herald, and for the IAAF.

Complete results, medallists, and the results of British athletes were published.

== Race results ==
=== Junior women's race (4.689 km) ===
==== Individual ====
Rank	Athlete	Country	Time
1st place, gold medalist(s)	Rose Kosgei	Kenya	14:58
2nd place, silver medalist(s)	Prisca Ngetich	Kenya	14:59
3rd place, bronze medalist(s)	Ayelech Worku	Ethiopia	15:02
4	Edna Kiplagat	Kenya	15:10
5	Zenebech Tadese	Ethiopia	15:11
6	Kei Satomura	Japan	15:12
7	Emiko Kojima	Japan	15:12
8	Caroline Tarus	Kenya	15:14
9	Anita Kiptum	Kenya	15:15
10	Agnes Kiprop	Kenya	15:15
11	Risa Tanaka	Japan	15:20
12	René Kalmer	South Africa	15:31
13	Worknesh Kidane	Ethiopia	15:32
14	Tomoko Hashimoto	Japan	15:40
15	Judit Plá	Spain	15:46
16	Kumiko Hiyama	Japan	15:48
17	Yuka Hata	Japan	15:51
18	Etaferahu Tarekegn	Ethiopia	15:53
19	Sonja Stolić	Yugoslavia	15:54
20	Kutre Dulecha	Ethiopia	15:55
21	Hind Chahid	Morocco	15:57
22	Katie Skorupska	United Kingdom	15:58
23	Merima Hashim	Ethiopia	15:58
24	Cathérine Lallemand	Belgium	16:01
25	Fabiane Cristine da Silva	Brazil	16:05
26	Malika Asahssah	Morocco	16:07
27	Sandra Levenez	France	16:07
28	Samira Bahdaoui	Morocco	16:09
29	Message Mapfumo	Zimbabwe	16:11
30	Erin McClure	Canada	16:11
31	Tatyana Khmeleva	Russia	16:12
32	Soumia Mastacou	Morocco	16:14
33	Yelena Tolstygina	Belarus	16:16
34	Alessandra Aguilar	Spain	16:18
35	Yelena Mikhaylova	Russia	16:19
36	Jennifer Handley	Canada	16:21
37	Laura Suffa	Germany	16:22
38	Iona Oltean	Romania	16:24
39	Larissa Kleinmann	Germany	16:26
40	Rialette Kruger	South Africa	16:27
41	Tanya Povey	United Kingdom	16:27
42	Tatyana Gerasimova	Russia	16:29
43	Ansie van Heerden	South Africa	16:30
44	Bertha Sánchez	Colombia	16:31
45	Mónica Rosa	Portugal	16:31
46	Ilze Kidson	South Africa	16:32
47	Martha Garces	Mexico	16:34
48	Natalia Rodríguez	Spain	16:35
49	Tuula Laitinen	Finland	16:35
50	Marina Munćan	Yugoslavia	16:35
51	Suzanne Ritter	Germany	16:36
52	Bouchra Benthami	Morocco	16:37
53	Khadija Touati	Algeria	16:38
54	Paula Hernandez	Spain	16:40
55	Elizabeth Mtombeni	South Africa	16:41
56	Helena Volná	Czech Republic	16:42
57	Irina Danilova	Russia	16:42
58	Kenza Dahmani	Algeria	16:47
59	Ana Rondón	Colombia	16:48
60	Anna Markelova	Turkmenistan	16:49
61	Rosa Morató	Spain	16:49
62	Rachel Nthulane	South Africa	16:50
63	Laura Cernat	Romania	16:51
64	Michelle de la Vina	United States	16:53
65	Catalina Big	Romania	16:54
66	Elizabeth Kampfe	United States	16:54
67	Anke Onsia	Belgium	16:54
68	Tamara Cojocar	Romania	16:55
69	Marja Loukkola	Finland	16:55
70	Johanna Raja-aho	Finland	16:56
71	Hakima Baatouche	Algeria	16:56
72	Nassira Taibi	Algeria	16:57
73	Amy Wiseman	United States	16:57
74	Zivile Balciunaité	Lithuania	16:58
75	Valquíria Santos	Brazil	16:58
76	Francine Darroch	Canada	16:59
77	Marzena Linkowska	Poland	17:00
78	Magdalena Haamwanyena	Namibia	17:00
79	Joelle Franzmann	Germany	17:01
80	Petra Teveli	Hungary	17:01
81	Olena Samko	Ukraine	17:01
82	Yâprak Kalemoglu	Turkey	17:02
83	Silvia Weissteiner	Italy	17:04
84	Laila Hmatou	Morocco	17:06
85	Jilly Ingman	United Kingdom	17:07
86	Tera Moody	United States	17:09
87	Zsanett Teveli	Hungary	17:09
88	Julie Martin	Canada	17:10
89	Donyazad Mimouni	Algeria	17:10
90	Kyla Barbour	United States	17:12
91	Almira Kuci	Yugoslavia	17:12
92	Sonia Scheurer	Germany	17:13
93	Sonia Thomas	United Kingdom	17:13
94	Celine Dutot	France	17:14
95	Bianca Cojocar	Romania	17:14
96	Bettina Pintér	Hungary	17:15
97	Louise Brown	United Kingdom	17:15
98	Souad Aït Salem	Algeria	17:17
99	Silvia Fernández	Spain	17:19
100	Ekta Huldhar	India	17:19
101	Marie-Celine Jacquard	France	17:21
102	Orsolya Ritter	Hungary	17:22
103	Cristina Pozzo	Italy	17:23
104	Bridget Quenzer	United States	17:26
105	Ayfer Yigit	Turkey	17:27
106	Celine Larnois	France	17:28
107	Romina Ridolfi	Italy	17:28
108	Maria Lynch	Ireland	17:30
109	Bojana Radojcic	Yugoslavia	17:33
110	Hanan Najih	France	17:33
111	Amy Waterlow	United Kingdom	17:34
112	Paulina Rath	Netherlands	17:34
113	Luana Pocorobba	Italy	17:37
114	Nina-Carita Liljedahl	Finland	17:38
115	Sümeyra Tali	Turkey	17:39
116	Elizabeth Benishai	Canada	17:40
117	Kristina Obronek	Slovenia	17:42
118	Aniela Buciu	Romania	17:43
119	Govindassamy Pangadjame	India	17:44
120	Renuka Hegde	India	17:46
121	Irina Podkorytova	Kazakhstan	17:47
122	Kim Hemstreet	Canada	17:49
123	Rosanna Cavoli	Italy	17:49
124	Nebhat Cavus	Turkey	17:52
125	Erika Abril	Colombia	17:55
126	Renuka Goferi	India	17:55
127	Marina Heurtault	France	17:56
128	Isabel Boldo	Brazil	17:56
129	Nathalie Rousseau	Belgium	17:59
130	Nóra Nemere	Hungary	18:03
131	Dildar Mamedova	Turkmenistan	18:06
132	Sandra Cardenas	Colombia	18:14
133	Marijana Stopic	Croatia	18:21
134	Alma Xicotencatl	Mexico	18:23
135	Ana do Nascimento	Brazil	18:26
136	Virginie Koomanikooa	Mauritius	20:40
—	Renate Rungger	Italy	DNF
—	Hilia Mundja	Namibia	DNF

==== Teams ====
Rank	Team	Points
1st place, gold medalist(s)	Kenya: Rose Kosgei / 1; Prisca Ngetich / 2; Edna Kiplagat / 4; Caroline Tarus / 8; (Anita Kiptum) / (9); (Agnes Kiprop) / (10)	15
2nd place, silver medalist(s)	Japan: Kei Satomura / 6; Emiko Kojima / 7; Risa Tanaka / 11; Tomoko Hashimoto / 14; (Kumiko Hiyama) / (16); (Yuka Hata) / (17)	38
3rd place, bronze medalist(s)	Ethiopia: Ayelech Worku / 3; Zenebech Tadese / 5; Worknesh Kidane / 13; Etaferahu Tarekegn / 18; (Kutre Dulecha) / (20); (Merima Hashim) / (23)	39
4	Morocco: Hind Chahid / 21; Malika Asahssah / 26; Samira Bahdaoui / 28; Soumia Mastacou / 32; (Bouchra Benthami) / (52); (Laila Hmatou) / (84)	107
5	South Africa: René Kalmer / 12; Rialette Kruger / 40; Ansie van Heerden / 43; Ilze Kidson / 46; (Elizabeth Mtombeni) / (55); (Rachel Nthulane) / (62)	141
6	Spain: Judit Plá / 15; Alessandra Aguilar / 34; Natalia Rodríguez / 48; Paula Hernandez / 54; (Rosa Morató) / (61); (Silvia Fernández) / (99)	151
7	Russia: Tatyana Khmeleva / 31; Yelena Mikhaylova / 35; Tatyana Gerasimova / 42; Irina Danilova / 57	165
8	Germany: Laura Suffa / 37; Larissa Kleinmann / 39; Suzanne Ritter / 51; Joelle Franzmann / 79; (Sonia Scheurer) / (92)	206
9	Canada: Erin McClure / 30; Jennifer Handley / 36; Francine Darroch / 76; Julie Martin / 88; (Elizabeth Benishai) / (116); (Kim Hemstreet) / (122)	230
10	Romania: Iona Oltean / 38; Laura Cernat / 63; Catalina Big / 65; Tamara Cojocar / 68; (Bianca Cojocar) / (95); (Aniela Buciu) / (118)	234
11	United Kingdom: Katie Skorupska / 22; Tanya Povey / 41; Jilly Ingman / 85; Sonia Thomas / 93; (Louise Brown) / (97); (Amy Waterlow) / (111)	241
12	Algeria: Khadija Touati / 53; Kenza Dahmani / 58; Hakima Baatouche / 71; Nassira Taibi / 72; (Donyazad Mimouni) / (89); (Souad Aït Salem) / (98)	254
13	Yugoslavia: Sonja Stolić / 19; Marina Munćan / 50; Almira Kuci / 91; Bojana Radojcic / 109	269
14	United States: Michelle de la Vina / 64; Elizabeth Kampfe / 66; Amy Wiseman / 73; Tera Moody / 86; (Kyla Barbour) / (90); (Bridget Quenzer) / (104)	289
15	Finland: Tuula Laitinen / 49; Marja Loukkola / 69; Johanna Raja-aho / 70; Nina-Carita Liljedahl / 114	302
16	France: Sandra Levenez / 27; Celine Dutot / 94; Marie-Celine Jacquard / 101; Celine Larnois / 106; (Hanan Najih) / (110); (Marina Heurtault) / (127)	328
17	Colombia: Bertha Sánchez / 44; Ana Rondón / 59; Erika Abril / 125; Sandra Cardenas / 132	360
18	Brazil: Fabiane Cristine da Silva / 25; Valquíria Santos / 75; Isabel Boldo / 128; Ana do Nascimento / 135	363
19	Hungary: Petra Teveli / 80; Zsanett Teveli / 87; Bettina Pintér / 96; Orsolya Ritter / 102; (Nóra Nemere) / (130)	365
20	Italy: Silvia Weissteiner / 83; Cristina Pozzo / 103; Romina Ridolfi / 107; Luana Pocorobba / 113; (Rosanna Cavoli) / (123); (Renate Rungger) / (DNF)	406
21	Turkey: Yâprak Kalemoglu / 82; Ayfer Yigit / 105; Sümeyra Tali / 115; Nebhat Cavus / 124	426
22	India: Ekta Huldhar / 100; Govindassamy Pangadjame / 119; Renuka Hegde / 120; Renuka Goferi / 126	465

- Note: Athletes in parentheses did not score for the team result

== Participation ==
An unofficial count yields the participation of 138 athletes from 39 countries in the Junior women's race. This is in agreement with the official numbers as published.

- Algeria (6)
- Belarus (1)
- Belgium (3)
- Brazil (4)
- Canada (6)
- Colombia (4)
- Croatia (1)
- Czech Republic (1)
- Ethiopia (6)
- Finland (4)
- France (6)
- Germany (5)
- Hungary (5)
- India (4)
- Ireland (1)
- Italy (6)
- Japan (6)
- Kazakhstan (1)
- Kenya (6)
- Lithuania (1)
- Mauritius (1)
- Mexico (2)
- Morocco (6)
- Namibia (2)
- Netherlands (1)
- Poland (1)
- Portugal (1)
- Romania (6)
- Russia (4)
- Slovenia (1)
- South Africa (6)
- Spain (6)
- Turkey (4)
- Turkmenistan (2)
- Ukraine (1)
- United Kingdom (6)
- United States (6)
- Yugoslavia (4)
- Zimbabwe (1)

== See also ==
- 1997 IAAF World Cross Country Championships – Senior men's race
- 1997 IAAF World Cross Country Championships – Junior men's race
- 1997 IAAF World Cross Country Championships – Senior women's race
