= 1997 IAAF World Cross Country Championships – Senior men's race =

Senior men's race at the 1997 IAAF World Cross Country Championships
- Organisers: IAAF
- Edition: 25th
- Date: March 23
- Host city: Turin, Italy
- Venue: Parco del Valentino
- Events: 1
- Distances: 12.333 km – Senior men
- Participation: 280 athletes from 58 nations

The Senior men's race at the 1997 IAAF World Cross Country Championships was held in Turin, Italy, at the Parco del Valentino on March 23, 1997. A report on the event was given in The New York Times, in the Herald, and for the IAAF.

Complete results, medallists, and the results of British athletes were published.

== Race results ==
=== Senior men's race (12.333 km) ===
==== Individual ====
Rank	Athlete	Country	Time
1st place, gold medalist(s)	Paul Tergat	Kenya	35:11
2nd place, silver medalist(s)	Salah Hissou	Morocco	35:13
3rd place, bronze medalist(s)	Tom Nyariki	Kenya	35:20
4	Paul Koech	Kenya	35:23
5	Mohammed Mourhit	Belgium	35:35
6	Bernard Barmasai^{†}	Kenya	35:35
7	Joseph Kibor	Kenya	35:37
8	Smail Sghir	Morocco	35:56
9	Julio Rey	Spain	35:57
10	Khaled Boulami	Morocco	35:59
11	Habte Jifar	Ethiopia	35:59
12	El Hassan Lahssini	Morocco	36:01
13	Assefa Mezegebu	Ethiopia	36:06
14	Jon Brown	United Kingdom	36:08
15	Domingos Castro	Portugal	36:16
16	Elarbi Khattabi	Morocco	36:18
17	Joshua Chelanga	Kenya	36:19
18	Ayele Mezegebu	Ethiopia	36:33
19	Shem Kororia	Kenya	36:34
20	Abdellah Béhar	France	36:37
21	José Manuel García	Spain	36:38
22	Brahim Boulami	Morocco	36:40
23	Abraham Assefa	Ethiopia	36:40
24	Benjamin Koskei	Kenya	36:43
25	Benedict Ako	Tanzania	36:43
26	Paulo Guerra	Portugal	36:46
27	Girma Tolla	Ethiopia	36:47
28	William Kiptum	Kenya	36:47
29	Mustapha Essaïd	France	36:47
30	Eduardo Henriques	Portugal	36:48
31	Kamiel Maase	Netherlands	36:49
32	Giuliano Battocletti	Italy	36:56
33	Tegenu Abebe	Ethiopia	37:00
34	Abel Chimukoko	Zimbabwe	37:02
35	Abderrahim Zitouna	Morocco	37:04
36	Ibrahim Seid	Ethiopia	37:04
37	Elenilson da Silva	Brazil	37:05
38	Christian Stephenson	United Kingdom	37:05
39	Alejandro Gómez	Spain	37:07
40	Simone Zanon	Italy	37:08
41	Faustin Saktay	Tanzania	37:09
42	José Manuel Martínez	Spain	37:09
43	Steffan White	United Kingdom	37:10
44	Yoshinori Shindo	Japan	37:10
45	Azzedine Sakhri	Algeria	37:10
46	Steve Moneghetti	Australia	37:11
47	John Kosgei	Kenya	37:12
48	Sérgio da Silva	Brazil	37:13
49	Patrick Kaotsane	South Africa	37:14
50	Seamus Power	Ireland	37:14
51	Scott Larson	United States	37:15
52	Umberto Pusterla	Italy	37:15
53	Alfredo Bráz	Portugal	37:16
54	Gabino Apolonio	Mexico	37:16
55	Shaun Creighton	Australia	37:17
56	Andrew Pearson	United Kingdom	37:18
57	Mark Coogan	United States	37:19
58	Reinholdt Iita	Namibia	37:22
59	Imre Berkovics	Hungary	37:24
60	Abdelhak Lebouazda	Algeria	37:24
61	Laban Nkete	South Africa	37:25
62	Mikaël Thomas	France	37:26
63	Yahia Azaidj	Algeria	37:27
64	Róbert Štefko	Slovakia	37:28
65	Rachid Berradi	Italy	37:28
66	Vítor Almeida	Portugal	37:31
67	René Godlieb	Netherlands	37:31
68	Lemi Erpassa	Ethiopia	37:32
69	Andy Bristow	United Kingdom	37:32
70	Abdelaziz Sahere	Morocco	37:33
71	Sergey Fedotov	Russia	37:34
72	Tadeo Nada	Tanzania	37:35
73	Rui Vieira	Portugal	37:35
74	Ezael Thlobo	South Africa	37:36
75	José Santos	Portugal	37:36
76	Gabriele De Nard	Italy	37:37
77	Samir Moussaoui	Algeria	37:38
78	Alejandro Méndez	Mexico	37:38
79	Vincenzo Modica	Italy	37:39
80	José Carlos Adán	Spain	37:39
81	Adam Motlagale	South Africa	37:39
82	Mustapha Bamouh	Morocco	37:40
83	Claes Nyberg	Sweden	37:40
84	Andrés Pérez	Spain	37:41
85	Joseph LeMay	United States	37:42
86	Pete Julian	United States	37:42
87	Sid-Ali Sakhri	Algeria	37:42
88	Alejandro Cuahtepizi	Mexico	37:43
89	Jürg Stalder	Switzerland	37:44
90	Darren Wilson	Australia	37:44
91	Réda Benzine	Algeria	37:44
92	Jacinto Navarrete	Colombia	37:45
93	Patrick Ndayisenga	Burundi	37:46
94	Pedro Cunha	Portugal	37:47
95	Makhosonke Fika	South Africa	37:47
96	Alberto Maravilha	Portugal	37:48
97	José Villanueva	Mexico	37:49
98	Brian Baker	United States	37:50
99	Jason Cameron	New Zealand	37:51
100	Julian Dwyer	Australia	37:51
101	Tom van Hooste	Belgium	37:53
102	Daisuke Arakawa	Japan	37:53
103	Jean-François Bertron	France	37:54
104	Ville Hautala	Finland	37:54
105	Justin Pugsley	United Kingdom	37:55
106	Santtu Mäkinen	Finland	37:55
107	John Gilay	Tanzania	37:58
108	Yoshinori Yokota	Japan	37:59
109	Chris Weber	Canada	37:59
110	Tim Hacker	United States	38:00
111	Pablo Olmedo	Mexico	38:01
112	Yuki Yamamoto	Japan	38:02
113	Greg van Hest	Netherlands	38:02
114	Xia Fengyuan	China	38:03
115	John Morapedi	South Africa	38:03
116	Paul Roden	United Kingdom	38:04
117	Duncan Ross	New Zealand	38:04
118	Benedito Gomes	Brazil	38:04
119	Cedric Dehouck	France	38:05
120	Rod de Highden	Australia	38:06
121	Paul Smith	New Zealand	38:07
122	Julius Gidabuday	Tanzania	38:07
123	Pacifique Ayabusa	Rwanda	38:08
124	Marcel Laros	Netherlands	38:08
125	Sergio Couto	Brazil	38:09
126	Stephen Phofi	South Africa	38:09
127	Cao Changhai	China	38:10
128	Joseph Nsengiyumya	Rwanda	38:11
129	Tesgie Legesse	Ethiopia	38:11
130	Yann Millon	France	38:12
131	Tsunake Kalamori	South Africa	38:18
132	Domenico D'Ambrosio	Italy	38:19
133	Tim de Cock	Belgium	38:21
134	Shawn Found	United States	38:22
135	Elias Bastos	Brazil	38:23
136	Neema Tuluway	Tanzania	38:24
137	Sean Quilty	Australia	38:29
138	Loïc van Mackenbergh	France	38:30
139	Amrish Kumar	India	38:31
140	Philip Starr	New Zealand	38:31
141	Bruno Toledo	Spain	38:34
142	Aleksandr Kuzin	Ukraine	38:34
143	Eric Bouffioux	Belgium	38:36
144	Kabo Gabaseme	Botswana	38:37
145	Zoltán Káldy	Hungary	38:38
146	Carlos Peña	Mexico	38:39
147	Joël Bourgeois	Canada	38:41
148	Abdulkadir Türk	Turkey	38:42
149	Simon Vroemen	Netherlands	38:43
150	Péter Jager	Hungary	38:44
151	Phil Costley	New Zealand	38:46
152	Abdelkrim Benzai	Algeria	38:47
153	Ayele Setegne	Israel	38:48
154	Steve Isbel	Australia	38:49
155	Martin Lauret	Netherlands	38:50
156	Fraser Bertram	Canada	38:51
157	Gianni Crepaldi	Italy	38:54
158	Robert Cook Jr.	United States	38:55
159	Juuso Rainio	Finland	38:56
160	William Vasquez	Colombia	38:56
161	Glynn Tromans	United Kingdom	38:57
162	José Amaro Lourenço	Angola	38:59
163	Igor Salamun	Slovenia	39:00
164	Jussi Virtanen	Finland	39:06
165	Mauricio Ladino	Colombia	39:07
166	Wang Zhicheng	China	39:07
167	Hendrick Ramaala	South Africa	39:08
168	Viktor Röthlin	Switzerland	39:10
169	Ernest Ndjissipou	Central African Republic	39:11
170	Pasi Mattila	Finland	39:13
171	Alphonse Munyeshyaka	Rwanda	39:13
172	Percy Sephoda	Lesotho	39:16
173	Keith Dowling	United States	39:18
174	Marko Kotila	Finland	39:18
175	Zoltán Kadlót	Hungary	39:20
176	Aron Shipanga	Namibia	39:21
177	Guy Schultz	Canada	39:21
178	Bhairav Singh	India	39:22
179	Trent Harlow	Australia	39:23
180	Zoltán Holba	Hungary	39:23
181	Salah Zereg	Algeria	39:30
182	Lesedinyana Lekgoa	Botswana	39:32
183	Sukru Onat	Turkey	39:32
184	Tom McGrath	Ireland	39:33
185	Nihat Bagci	Turkey	39:34
186	Jason Bunston	Canada	39:34
187	János Szemán	Hungary	39:36
188	Kevin Christiani	Canada	39:37
189	Toomas Tarm	Estonia	39:41
190	Menon Ramsamy	Mauritius	39:44
191	Ma Hongsheng	China	39:44
192	Patrick Ishyaka	Rwanda	39:44
193	Justin Rutaba	Rwanda	39:53
194	Heiki Sarapuu	Estonia	39:54
195	Julián Berrio	Colombia	39:55
196	Rustam Radjapov	Turkmenistan	39:57
197	Samir Benfarès	France	40:02
198	Khristo Stefanov	Bulgaria	40:03
199	Khauta Ntsoele	Lesotho	40:07
200	Thabiso Moqhali	Lesotho	40:09
201	Adamou Aboubakar	Cameroon	40:10
202	Jeremy Deere	Canada	40:12
203	Min Ahebaike	China	40:14
204	Alagawadi Shivananda	India	40:15
205	Mehmet Günen	Turkey	40:16
206	Nazirdin Akylbekov	Kyrgyzstan	40:19
207	Francisco Mondragon	Mexico	40:22
208	Satilmis Atmaca	Turkey	40:24
209	Manbir Singh	India	40:27
210	Peter Cardle	Canada	40:31
211	Pasi Jeremejeff	Finland	40:33
212	Soro Bassirima	Côte d'Ivoire	40:34
213	David Galindo	Mexico	40:35
214	Dashrath Tigga	India	40:35
215	Leonid Pykhteyev	Kyrgyzstan	40:41
216	Remzi Atli	Turkey	40:41
217	Mathieu Kouanotso	Cameroon	40:44
218	Michiel Otten	Netherlands	40:45
219	Bayan Batyrbekov	Kyrgyzstan	40:46
220	Lalan Kumar	India	40:50
221	Simon Labiche	Seychelles	40:54
222	Petrus Adolf	Namibia	40:56
223	Bethold Karumendu	Namibia	40:56
224	Jacinto López	Colombia	40:58
225	Pierre Foka	Cameroon	41:04
226	Atadjan Duzdyev	Turkmenistan	41:06
227	Bertus Bock	Namibia	41:08
228	Nedeljko Ravic	Croatia	41:10
229	Frederick Baldacchino	Malta	41:15
230	Mohamed Al-Malki	Yemen	41:32
231	Abdul Sameer Moos	Mauritius	41:33
232	Risto Utsmuts	Estonia	41:37
233	Xandru Grech	Malta	41:40
234	Pierre Kenzo	Cameroon	41:40
235	Urmas Sadam	Estonia	41:41
236	Mohamed Al-Atashi	Yemen	41:54
237	Bruno Armance	Mauritius	41:57
238	William Roldán	Colombia	42:02
239	Gustave Ombouma	Congo	42:04
240	John Buhagiar	Malta	42:06
241	Patrick Moonsamy	Mauritius	42:10
242	Jaanus Gross	Estonia	42:11
243	Fatih Cintimar	Turkey	42:16
244	Anwar Al-Harazi	Yemen	42:18
245	Sentso Retere	Lesotho	42:20
246	Khauta Khotle	Lesotho	42:27
247	Meelis Minn	Estonia	42:37
248	Sergey Zabavskiy	Tajikistan	42:51
249	Gervais Yapo Yapi	Côte d'Ivoire	43:02
250	Kopamo Pekile	Lesotho	43:03
251	Mohamed Al-Hada	Yemen	43:03
252	Robert Attard	Malta	43:10
253	Andrew Tafagnda	Cameroon	43:12
254	Jean Paul Louise	Mauritius	43:17
255	Ali Yahya	Yemen	43:19
256	Celestin Nguepnang	Cameroon	43:23
257	Christopher Blackburn	Mauritius	43:48
258	Joseph Pace	Malta	43:53
259	Lee Kar-Lun	Hong Kong	44:04
260	Peter Azzopardi	Malta	44:11
261	Goim Hussein	Yemen	44:28
262	André Camilleri	Malta	44:38
263	Diosdado Ndemensogo	Equatorial Guinea	44:52
264	Norbert Hariba	Seychelles	45:08
265	Salim Servina	Seychelles	45:10
—	Tendai Chimusasa	Zimbabwe	DNF
—	Keith Cullen	United Kingdom	DNF
—	Gennaro Di Napoli	Italy	DNF
—	Mohamed Ezzher	France	DNF
—	Mathias Ntawulikura	Rwanda	DNF
—	Julian Paynter	Australia	DNF
—	Miroslav Vanko	Slovakia	DNF
—	Kamel Kohil	Algeria	DNF
—	Leonardo Guedes	Brazil	DNF
—	Linton McKenzie	Jamaica	DNF
—	Antonio Pérez	Spain	DNF
—	Emerson Bem	Brazil	DNF
—	Ferenc Sági	Hungary	DNF
—	Sergey Kamayev	Turkmenistan	DNF
—	Gairat Nigmatov	Tajikistan	DNF
—	Carlos de la Torre	Spain	DNS
—	Ihab Abdalah Salama	Palestine	DNS
—	Francis Akpan	Sierra Leone	DNS
—	Mohamed Bangura	Sierra Leone	DNS
—	Alfred Dura	Sierra Leone	DNS
—	Peter Kanyako	Sierra Leone	DNS

^{†}: Athlete marked in the results list as nonscorer.

==== Teams ====
Rank	Team	Points
1st place, gold medalist(s)	Kenya: Paul Tergat / 1; Tom Nyariki / 3; Paul Koech / 4; Joseph Kibor / 7; Joshua Chelanga / 17; Shem Kororia / 19; (Benjamin Koskei) / (24); (William Kiptum) / (28); (John Kosgei) / (47)	51
2nd place, silver medalist(s)	Morocco: Salah Hissou / 2; Smail Sghir / 8; Khaled Boulami / 10; El Hassan Lahssini / 12; Elarbi Khattabi / 16; Brahim Boulami / 22; (Abderrahim Zitouna) / (35); (Abdelaziz Sahere) / (70); (Mustapha Bamouh) / (82)	70
3rd place, bronze medalist(s)	Ethiopia: Habte Jifar / 11; Assefa Mezegebu / 13; Ayele Mezegebu / 18; Abraham Assefa / 23; Girma Tolla / 27; Tegenu Abebe / 33; (Ibrahim Seid) / (36); (Lemi Erpassa) / (68); (Tesgie Legesse) / (129)	125
4	Portugal: Domingos Castro / 15; Paulo Guerra / 26; Eduardo Henriques / 30; Alfredo Bráz / 53; Vítor Almeida / 66; Rui Vieira / 73; (José Santos) / (75); (Pedro Cunha) / (94); (Alberto Maravilha) / (96)	263
5	Spain: Julio Rey / 9; José Manuel García / 21; Alejandro Gómez / 39; José Manuel Martínez / 42; José Carlos Adán / 80; Andrés Pérez / 84; (Bruno Toledo) / (141); (Antonio Pérez) / (DNF)	275
6	United Kingdom: Jon Brown / 14; Christian Stephenson / 38; Steffan White / 43; Andrew Pearson / 56; Andy Bristow / 69; Justin Pugsley / 105; (Paul Roden) / (116); (Glynn Tromans) / (161); (Keith Cullen) / (DNF)	325
7	Italy: Giuliano Battocletti / 32; Simone Zanon / 40; Umberto Pusterla / 52; Rachid Berradi / 65; Gabriele De Nard / 76; Vincenzo Modica / 79; (Domenico D'Ambrosio) / (132); (Gianni Crepaldi) / (157); (Gennaro Di Napoli) / (DNF)	344
8	Algeria: Azzedine Sakhri / 45; Abdelhak Lebouazda / 60; Yahia Azaidj / 63; Samir Moussaoui / 77; Sid-Ali Sakhri / 87; Réda Benzine / 91; (Abdelkrim Benzai) / (152); (Salah Zereg) / (181); (Kamel Kohil) / (DNF)	423
9	France: Abdellah Béhar / 20; Mustapha Essaïd / 29; Mikaël Thomas / 62; Jean-François Bertron / 103; Cedric Dehouck / 119; Yann Millon / 130; (Loïc van Mackenbergh) / (138); (Samir Benfarès) / (197); (Mohamed Ezzher) / (DNF)	463
10	South Africa: Patrick Kaotsane / 49; Laban Nkete / 61; Ezael Thlobo / 74; Adam Motlagale / 81; Makhosonke Fika / 95; John Morapedi / 115; (Stephen Phofi) / (126); (Tsunake Kalamori) / (131); (Hendrick Ramaala) / (167)	475
11	United States: Scott Larson / 51; Mark Coogan / 57; Joseph LeMay / 85; Pete Julian / 86; Brian Baker / 98; Tim Hacker / 110; (Shawn Found) / (134); (Robert Cook Jr.) / (158); (Keith Dowling) / (173)	487
12	Tanzania: Benedict Ako / 25; Faustin Saktay / 41; Tadeo Nada / 72; John Gilay / 107; Julius Gidabuday / 122; Neema Tuluway / 136	503
13	Australia: Steve Moneghetti / 46; Shaun Creighton / 55; Darren Wilson / 90; Julian Dwyer / 100; Rod de Highden / 120; Sean Quilty / 137; (Steve Isbel) / (154); (Trent Harlow) / (179); (Julian Paynter) / (DNF)	548
14	Mexico: Gabino Apolonio / 54; Alejandro Méndez / 78; Alejandro Cuahtepizi / 88; José Villanueva / 97; Pablo Olmedo / 111; Carlos Peña / 146; (Francisco Mondragon) / (207); (David Galindo) / (213)	574
15	Netherlands: Kamiel Maase / 31; René Godlieb / 67; Greg van Hest / 113; Marcel Laros / 124; Simon Vroemen / 149; Martin Lauret / 155; (Michiel Otten) / (218)	639
16	Finland: Ville Hautala / 104; Santtu Mäkinen / 106; Juuso Rainio / 159; Jussi Virtanen / 164; Pasi Mattila / 170; Marko Kotila / 174; (Pasi Jeremejeff) / (211)	877
17	Hungary: Imre Berkovics / 59; Zoltán Káldy / 145; Péter Jager / 150; Zoltán Kadlót / 175; Zoltán Holba / 180; János Szemán / 187; (Ferenc Sági) / (DNF)	896
18	Canada: Chris Weber / 109; Joël Bourgeois / 147; Fraser Bertram / 156; Guy Schultz / 177; Jason Bunston / 186; Kevin Christiani / 188; (Jeremy Deere) / (202); (Peter Cardle) / (210)	963
19	Colombia: Jacinto Navarrete / 92; William Vasquez / 160; Mauricio Ladino / 165; Julián Berrio / 195; Jacinto López / 224; William Roldán / 238	1074
20	Turkey: Abdulkadir Türk / 148; Sukru Onat / 183; Nihat Bagci / 185; Mehmet Günen / 205; Satilmis Atmaca / 208; Remzi Atli / 216; (Fatih Cintimar) / (243)	1145
21	India: Amrish Kumar / 139; Bhairav Singh / 178; Alagawadi Shivananda / 204; Manbir Singh / 209; Dashrath Tigga / 214; Lalan Kumar / 220	1164
22	Lesotho: Percy Sephoda / 172; Khauta Ntsoele / 199; Thabiso Moqhali / 200; Sentso Retere / 245; Khauta Khotle / 246; Kopamo Pekile / 250	1312
23	Estonia: Toomas Tarm / 189; Heiki Sarapuu / 194; Risto Utsmuts / 232; Urmas Sadam / 235; Jaanus Gross / 242; Meelis Minn / 247	1339
24	Cameroon: Adamou Aboubakar / 201; Mathieu Kouanotso / 217; Pierre Foka / 225; Pierre Kenzo / 234; Andrew Tafagnda / 253; Celestin Nguepnang / 256	1386
25	Mauritius: Menon Ramsamy / 190; Abdul Sameer Moos / 231; Bruno Armance / 237; Patrick Moonsamy / 241; Jean Paul Louise / 254; Christopher Blackburn / 257	1410
26	Malta: Frederick Baldacchino / 229; Xandru Grech / 233; John Buhagiar / 240; Robert Attard / 252; Joseph Pace / 258; Peter Azzopardi / 260; (André Camilleri) / (262)	1472
27	Yemen: Mohamed Al-Malki / 230; Mohamed Al-Atashi / 236; Anwar Al-Harazi / 244; Mohamed Al-Hada / 251; Ali Yahya / 255; Goim Hussein / 261	1477
DNF	Brazil: (Elenilson da Silva) / (37); (Sérgio da Silva) / (48); (Benedito Gomes) / (118); (Sergio Couto) / (125); (Elias Bastos) / (135); (Leonardo Guedes) / (DNF); (Emerson Bem) / (DNF)	DNF
DNF	Rwanda: (Pacifique Ayabusa) / (123); (Joseph Nsengiyumya) / (128); (Alphonse Munyeshyaka) / (171); (Patrick Ishyaka) / (192); (Justin Rutaba) / (193); (Mathias Ntawulikura) / (DNF)	DNF

- Note: Athletes in parentheses did not score for the team result

== Participation ==
An unofficial count yields the participation of 280 athletes from 58 countries in the Senior men's race. This is in agreement with the official numbers as published. Although announced, athletes from Sierra Leone did not show.

- Algeria (9)
- Angola (1)
- Australia (9)
- Belgium (4)
- Botswana (2)
- Brazil (7)
- Bulgaria (1)
- Burundi (1)
- Cameroon (6)
- Canada (8)
- Central African Republic (1)
- China (5)
- Colombia (6)
- Congo (1)
- Côte d'Ivoire (2)
- Croatia (1)
- Equatorial Guinea (1)
- Estonia (6)
- Ethiopia (9)
- Finland (7)
- France (9)
- Hong Kong (1)
- Hungary (7)
- India (6)
- Ireland (2)
- Israel (1)
- Italy (9)
- Jamaica (1)
- Japan (4)
- Kenya (10)
- Kyrgyzstan (3)
- Lesotho (6)
- Malta (7)
- Mauritius (6)
- Mexico (8)
- Morocco (9)
- Namibia (5)
- Netherlands (7)
- New Zealand (5)
- Portugal (9)
- Russia (1)
- Rwanda (6)
- Seychelles (3)
- Slovakia (2)
- Slovenia (1)
- South Africa (9)
- Spain (8)
- Sweden (1)
- Switzerland (2)
- Tajikistan (2)
- Tanzania (6)
- Turkey (7)
- Turkmenistan (3)
- Ukraine (1)
- United Kingdom (9)
- United States (9)
- Yemen (6)
- Zimbabwe (2)

== See also ==
- 1997 IAAF World Cross Country Championships – Junior men's race
- 1997 IAAF World Cross Country Championships – Senior women's race
- 1997 IAAF World Cross Country Championships – Junior women's race
