= Women's Mini Marathon, Dublin =

Annual race in Dublin, Ireland

- Date: Sunday of June Bank Holiday Weekend
- Location: Dublin, Ireland
- Event type: Road
- Distance: 10km
- Primary sponsor: Vhi Healthcare
- Established: 1983
- Course records: 31:28 (2000) (Republic of Ireland) Sonia O'Sullivan
- Website: Dublin Women's Mini Marathon
- Participants: 25,480 (2019)

The Women's Mini Marathon is an annual 10k event, which takes place every June bank holiday Sunday on the streets of Dublin, Ireland. It is the largest women's event of its kind in the world, and is the largest one-day charity fundraising event in Ireland. The event has been sponsored by Irish insurance company Vhi Healthcare.

In 1983, 9,000 women entered the inaugural event. The event grew in popularity as women took more interest in their health and fitness. In 2014 it reached a record attendance when over 41,000 women participated.

Since its inception, participants have raised over €226 million for charitable causes throughout Ireland. Participants decide which charity they will support.

The Women's Mini Marathon is a national institution, beloved by women throughout the country, and every year brings enormous cultural, economic, and societal benefits to the city.

== History ==
A small group of male athletes gathered in the Mill House in Stillorgan in 1983. They concluded that an all-women's race would be suitable for increasing female participation. The Evening Press was named as the sponsor and Dundrum South Dublin Athletics Club as the host club.

Several Irish women's distance runners have taken part in the race. Catherina McKiernan recorded her first of four wins in her autobiography, Running for My Life, saying: "I enjoyed every moment of it. The crowds were more incredible than I expected, and it was just something I always wanted to do."

In recent years, charities have used online services such as Facebook, Twitter, and podcasting to promote their involvement.

== Sponsorship ==
The race has had a large list of sponsors throughout its history. VHI is the current title sponsor and intends to continue its association with the race until 2021.

From the beginning, a Dublin evening newspaper has promoted the race, acting as its media sponsor. The Evening Herald took over this role from the Evening Press in 1996 when it went defunct in 1995. In 2001, it was known as the Tesco Ireland Evening Herald Women's Mini-Marathon. For the 2003 race, the Herald and Nike were the only sponsors. Other sponsors have included Elverys, Citroën and Newbridge Silverware. From 2004 until 2014 it became known as the Flora Women's Mini Marathon. The Order of Malta is involved on the day.

== Preparation ==
The 3 June 2018 VHI Women's Mini Marathon moved to a Sunday event. 30,000 women lined out for the race. It was won by Lizzie Lee in a time of 34 minutes and 18 seconds. The 2020 VHI Women's Mini Marathon was due to take place on Sunday, 31 May 2020. However, due to COVID-19 pandemic in Ireland, the event was postponed and later canceled. A Virtual Women's Mini Marathon was instead planned over ten days 1–10 October. The 2021 event was also virtual and took place on 19 September 2011. The 2022 event returned to the streets of Dublin on Sunday 5 June.

To prepare for the event, over 2,200 crash barriers are set up at the start and finish, on the course, and in the Reunion Area around Merrion Square. Approximately 110,000 paper cups are laid out at the water stations which supply over 34,000 litres of water for the participants, and some 250 toilets are ordered for the day. Over 1000 race stewards and personnel are on hand to ensure that the event runs smoothly on the day.

== Notable winners ==
Multiple times World Cross-Country silver medalist Catherina McKiernan won the event in 1998, 1999, and 2004. Sonia O'Sullivan won the event in 2000, months before she went on to win the silver in the Olympic 5000m. O'Sullivan's time of 31m 23s set a record that has yet to be beaten in this race. Kenya's Magdaline Chemjor won the 2001 edition. Lizzie Lee won the event in 2018 and later went on to win the Irish National Title and finish third outright in the Dublin Marathon in October that year.

== Recent years ==
=== 2000 ===
Rank	Athlete	Country	Result	Notes
1st place, gold medalist(s)	Sonia O'Sullivan	Ireland	31:28	Record time
2nd place, silver medalist(s)	Magdaline Chemjor	Kenya	?	
3rd place, bronze medalist(s)	?		?	

The 2000 mini-marathon was the 18th running of the event.

Sonia O'Sullivan won the race, in a record time of 31 minutes and 28 seconds. Magdaline Chemjor from Kenya finished in second place.

=== 2001 ===
Rank	Athlete	Country	Result	Notes
1st place, gold medalist(s)	Magdaline Chemjor	Kenya	?	
2nd place, silver medalist(s)	Sonia O'Sullivan	Ireland	33:26	
3rd place, bronze medalist(s)	Valerie Vaughan	Ireland	?	

The 2001 mini-marathon was the 19th running of the event and took place on 4 June. More than 31,000 females took part in the mini-marathon.

Magdaline Chemjor from Kenya won the race. Sonia O'Sullivan finished in second place inside 33 minutes and 26 seconds, later announcing her intention to not contest any track races that summer, including the World Championships in Canada. She claimed that the 2000 Summer Olympics in Sydney, at which she won a silver medal, had tired her "mentally and physically" and that she wanted "to take a good rest", having been "suffering from illness all too often" that year. Valerie Vaughan finished in third place inside 34 minutes.

=== 2004 ===
The 2004 mini-marathon was the 22nd running of the event.

It raised a total of €9 million for charity.

=== 2005 ===
Rank	Athlete	Country	Result	Notes
1st place, gold medalist(s)	Sonia O'Sullivan	Ireland	33:07	
2nd place, silver medalist(s)	Pauline Curley	Ireland	?	
3rd place, bronze medalist(s)	Annette Kealy	Ireland	?	

The 2006 mini-marathon was the 23rd running of the event and took place on 6 June. Over 40,000 females took part in the race.

Sonia O'Sullivan won the race inside 33 minutes and 7 seconds. Pauline Curley from Tullamore finished in second place. Annette Kealy from Malahide finished in third place.

=== 2006 ===
Rank	Athlete	Country	Result	Notes
1st place, gold medalist(s)	Pauline Curley	Ireland	35:04	Second victory
2nd place, silver medalist(s)	Niamh O'Sullivan	Ireland	35:18	
3rd place, bronze medalist(s)	Orla O'Mahony	Ireland	35:41	

The 2006 mini-marathon was the 24th running of the event and took place on 5 June.

Pauline Curley from County Offaly won the race inside 35 minutes and 4 seconds. It was her second victory in this race. Niamh O'Sullivan from County Kerry finished in second place in a time of 35 minutes and 18 seconds. Orla O'Mahony from Raheny finished in third place in a time of 35 minutes and 41 seconds.

=== 2007 ===
Rank	Athlete	Country	Result	Notes
1st place, gold medalist(s)	Marie Davenport	Ireland	33:14	
2nd place, silver medalist(s)	Rosemary Ryan	Ireland	?	
3rd place, bronze medalist(s)	Pauline Curley	Ireland	?	

The 2007 mini-marathon was the 25th running of the event and took place on 4 June.

Debutant Marie Davenport from County Clare won the race inside 33 minutes and 14 seconds, later declaring her interest in representing Ireland at the 2008 Summer Olympics in Beijing. Rosemary Ryan from Limerick finished in second place. The 2006 winner, Pauline Curley, finished in third place.

A total of €14 million was raised for charity.

=== 2008 ===
Rank	Athlete	Country	Result
1st place, gold medalist(s)	Annette Kealy	Ireland	
2nd place, silver medalist(s)	Pauline Curley	Ireland	
3rd place, bronze medalist(s)	Siobhan O'Doherty	Ireland	

The 2008 mini-marathon was the 26th running of the event, which was won by Annette Kealy.

RTÉ television editor Mary Butler, from Dún Laoghaire, took part via her wheelchair after sustaining a chipped ankle bone day earlier. She was pushed along by newsreader Eileen Dunne and news editor Pat Brennan.

A total of €14 million was raised for charity.

=== 2009 ===
Rank	Athlete	Country	Result	Notes
1st place, gold medalist(s)	Rosemary Ryan	Ireland	34:36	
2nd place, silver medalist(s)	Pauline Curley	Ireland	35:41	
3rd place, bronze medalist(s)	Annette Kealy	Ireland	36:04	
4	Siobhan O'Doherty	Ireland	36:27	

The 2009 mini-marathon was the 27th running of the event and took place on 1 June. It was part of a weekend of events taking place in the country which included the Cork City Marathon and the Volvo Ocean Race in Galway. 40,374 females took part in the event, the sixth consecutive year that the 40,000 barrier was broken. A record-breaking 280 charities registered to take part.

Spectators included Desperate Housewives actress Dana Delany, whilst participants included RTÉ personalities Síle and Gráinne Seoige, model Glenda Gilson and former Xposé presenter Lorraine Keane. 85-year-old Maureen Armstrong from Thurles, County Tipperary, was the race's oldest competitor.

Rosemary Ryan from Limerick was the winner in a time of 34 minutes and 36 seconds, completing the race over one minute quicker than the 2008 winner. Pauline Curley from County Offaly finished in second place, one minute behind Ryan. Annette Kealy from Raheny finished in third place. Siobhan O'Doherty from County Tipperary finished in fourth place.

A total of €15 million was expected to be raised for charity.

=== 2010 ===
Rank	Athlete	Country	Result	Notes
1st place, gold medalist(s)	Linda Byrne	Ireland	34:29	
2nd place, silver medalist(s)	Maria McCambridge	Ireland	34:31	
3rd place, bronze medalist(s)	Teresa McGloin	Ireland	34:36	

=== 2011 ===
Rank	Athlete	Country	Result	Notes
1st place, gold medalist(s)	Caitriona Jennings	Ireland	35:28	
2nd place, silver medalist(s)	Siobhan O'Doherty	Ireland	35:31	
3rd place, bronze medalist(s)	Aoife Talty	Ireland	35:54	

=== 2012 ===
Rank	Athlete	Country	Result	Notes
1st place, gold medalist(s)	Linda Byrne	Ireland	33:30	
2nd place, silver medalist(s)	Siobhan O'Doherty	Ireland	35:09	
3rd place, bronze medalist(s)	Barbara Cleary	Ireland	35:11	
4	Fiona Roche	Ireland	35:18	

=== 2013 ===
Rank	Athlete	Country	Result	Notes
1st place, gold medalist(s)	Siobhan O'Doherty	Ireland	34:20	
2nd place, silver medalist(s)	Fiona Roche	Ireland	34:43	
3rd place, bronze medalist(s)	Maria McCambridge	Ireland	35:00	

=== 2014 ===
Rank	Athlete	Country	Result	Notes
1st place, gold medalist(s)	Barbara Cleary	Ireland	34:07	
2nd place, silver medalist(s)	Maria McCambridge	Ireland	34:29	
3rd place, bronze medalist(s)	Catherina McKiernan	Ireland	34:38	

=== 2015 ===
Rank	Athlete	Country	Result	Notes
1st place, gold medalist(s)	Maria McCambridge	Ireland	34:03	
2nd place, silver medalist(s)	Ann Marie McGlynn	Ireland	34:42	
3rd place, bronze medalist(s)	Catherina McKiernan	Ireland	34:46	

=== 2016 ===
Rank	Athlete	Country	Result	Notes
1st place, gold medalist(s)	Siobhan O'Doherty	Ireland	34:30	
2nd place, silver medalist(s)	Natasha Adams	Ireland	34:33	
3rd place, bronze medalist(s)	Sarah Mulligan	Ireland	35:28	

=== 2017 ===
Rank	Athlete	Country	Result	Notes
1st place, gold medalist(s)	Ann Marie McGlynn	Ireland	33:55	
2nd place, silver medalist(s)	Laura Shaughnessy	Ireland	34:27	
3rd place, bronze medalist(s)	Catherina Mullen	Ireland	34:54	

=== 2018 ===
Rank	Athlete	Country	Result	Notes
1st place, gold medalist(s)	Lizzie Lee	Ireland	34:18	
2nd place, silver medalist(s)	Laura Shaughnessy	Ireland	34:30	
3rd place, bronze medalist(s)	Siobhan O'Doherty	Ireland	34:54	

=== 2019 ===
Rank	Athlete	Country	Result	Notes
1st place, gold medalist(s)	Aoibhe Richardson	Ireland	34:35	
2nd place, silver medalist(s)	Catherina Mullen	Ireland	35:01	
3rd place, bronze medalist(s)	Breege Connolly	Ireland	35:13	

== Television coverage ==
Setanta Sports broadcast race highlights each year from 2005 to 2015 and each year the event is featured by all national media broadcasters.

== See also ==
- Great Ireland Run
