= 1997 IAAF World Cross Country Championships – Junior men's race =

Junior men's race at the 1997 IAAF World Cross Country Championships
- Organisers: IAAF
- Edition: 25th
- Date: March 23
- Host city: Turin, Italy
- Venue: Parco del Valentino
- Events: 1
- Distances: 8.511 km – Junior men
- Participation: 160 athletes from 48 nations

The Junior men's race at the 1997 IAAF World Cross Country Championships was held in Turin, Italy, at the Parco del Valentino on March 23, 1997. A report on the event was given in The New York Times, in the Herald, and for the IAAF.

Complete results, medallists, and the results of British athletes were published.

== Race results ==
=== Junior men's race (8.511 km) ===
==== Individual ====
Rank	Athlete	Country	Time
1st place, gold medalist(s)	Elijah Korir	Kenya	24:21
2nd place, silver medalist(s)	Million Wolde	Ethiopia	24:28
3rd place, bronze medalist(s)	Paul Kosgei	Kenya	24:29
4	John Gwako	Kenya	24:58
5	Charles Kwambai	Kenya	25:02
6	Patrick Ivuti	Kenya	25:06
7	Alene Emere	Ethiopia	25:10
8	Godfrey Nyombi	Uganda	25:14
9	Kipchumba Mitei	Kenya	25:20
10	Yibeltal Admassu	Ethiopia	25:22
11	Ali Ezzine	Morocco	25:24
12	Haylu Mekonnen	Ethiopia	25:25
13	Jafred Lorone	Uganda	25:37
14	Dereje Tadesse	Ethiopia	25:38
15	Hiroyuki Ogawa	Japan	25:50
16	Mohamed Awol	Ethiopia	25:51
17	Ali Saïdi-Sief	Algeria	25:55
18	Shinichi Shibata	Japan	25:55
19	Adil Kaouch	Morocco	25:58
20	Anwar O.M. Ali	Yemen	26:02
21	Abderahim Bouchlouch	Morocco	26:02
22	Bouabdallah Tahri	France	26:03
23	Hicham Lamalem	Morocco	26:03
24	George Majaji	Zimbabwe	26:08
25	Yuji Ibi	Japan	26:10
26	Juan Carlos Higuero	Spain	26:12
27	Koichiro Koike	Japan	26:14
28	Juan José Lozano	Spain	26:17
29	Aziz El Makhrout	Morocco	26:17
30	Richard Mavuso	South Africa	26:19
31	Tomoki Sugiyama	Japan	26:22
32	Ben Chesang	Uganda	26:24
33	Nicolò Rotondo	Italy	26:25
34	Vincent Kuotane	South Africa	26:26
35	Khaya Gqotso	South Africa	26:28
36	Pablo Villalobos	Spain	26:34
37	Mark Thompson	Australia	26:36
38	Jussi Utriainen	Finland	26:37
39	Ahmed Ezzobayry	Morocco	26:39
40	Shoji Miyai	Japan	26:40
41	Roman Usov	Russia	26:43
42	Glody Dube	Botswana	26:44
43	Luiz Paula	Brazil	26:45
44	Cayetano Hernandez	Mexico	26:46
45	Abdelkarim Bouchamia	Algeria	26:50
46	Ovidiu Tat	Romania	26:50
47	Alberto Mosca	Italy	26:52
48	Ben Mogola	South Africa	26:54
49	Levente Timár	Hungary	26:57
50	Marko Hwahu	Tanzania	26:57
51	Abdul Alizindani	United States	26:58
52	Teodoro Barradas	Mexico	26:58
53	Gonzalo Gutierrez	Mexico	26:59
54	José Bastos	Spain	27:03
55	Kelebone Makoetlane	Lesotho	27:04
56	Gareth Turnbull	Ireland	27:04
57	Giuseppe Minici	Italy	27:05
58	Ferenc Békési	Hungary	27:07
59	Abdulaziz Abdulrahman	Yemen	27:08
60	Mukat Derbe	Israel	27:08
61	Adria García	Spain	27:09
62	Claudio Brandalise	Italy	27:11
63	Kais Bouziane	Algeria	27:12
64	Sam Haughian	United Kingdom	27:12
65	Steve Leuer	United States	27:13
66	Gavin Thompson	United Kingdom	27:15
67	Yazid Zidani	Algeria	27:17
68	Said Ali Hadji	Algeria	27:17
69	Paulo Almeida	Brazil	27:19
70	Halil Tekin	Turkey	27:20
71	Paul Morrison	Canada	27:21
72	Marcin Grzegorzewski	Poland	27:23
73	Raymond Fontaine	France	27:24
74	Juan Carlos de Bastos	Argentina	27:24
75	Manuel Damião	Portugal	27:25
76	Clinton Mackevicius	Australia	27:27
77	Igor Teteryukov	Belarus	27:27
78	Makhubalo Mngomezulu	South Africa	27:27
79	Robert Leblanc	United States	27:28
80	Hicham Anique	France	27:30
81	Paul Fenn	Australia	27:30
82	Vincent Moroga	Uganda	27:31
83	Alister Moses	United Kingdom	27:31
84	Viktor Lomonosov	Belarus	27:32
85	Takhir Mamashayev	Kazakhstan	27:33
86	Michael Endjala	Namibia	27:33
87	Damien Rouquet	France	27:34
88	Olivier Mignon	France	27:35
89	Jari Matinlauri	Finland	27:36
90	Dilaver Kanber	Turkey	27:37
91	David Mitchinson	United Kingdom	27:40
92	Kevin Koeper	United States	27:41
93	Iván Hierro	Spain	27:43
94	Augusto Simón Veuthey	Argentina	27:44
95	Thomas Murley	United States	27:44
96	Martin Dent	Australia	27:46
97	Willem Rooi	Namibia	27:47
98	Simon Burton	United Kingdom	27:48
99	Yusuf Zepak	Turkey	27:49
100	Mokhejano Lesenyeho	Lesotho	27:50
101	Mikael Talasjoki	Finland	27:51
102	Jerome van de Meerssche	Belgium	27:51
103	Nick Govaerts	Belgium	27:52
104	Arun D'Souza	India	27:53
105	Josep Sansa	Andorra	27:54
106	Mikko Ristimäki	Finland	27:56
107	Pietro Pelusi	Italy	27:57
108	Drew Graham	Canada	27:58
109	Rob Detert	Netherlands	27:59
110	Mohamed Al-Khawlani	Yemen	27:59
111	Tsiliso Raletsatsi	Lesotho	28:00
112	Latamene Oumouhand	Algeria	28:02
113	Khaled Al-Atashi	Yemen	28:03
114	Jonathan Matos	Brazil	28:04
115	Bruce Wright	Canada	28:06
116	Ganpati Bhusanur	India	28:07
117	Jérôme Schaffner	Switzerland	28:07
118	Libor Flemr	Czech Republic	28:08
119	Imre Szabó	Hungary	28:09
120	Pasqualino Zammataro	Italy	28:10
121	César Villanueva	Mexico	28:11
122	Pierre-André Ramuz	Switzerland	28:13
123	André da Silva	Brazil	28:15
124	David Arabasz	Czech Republic	28:17
125	Rudolf Cloete	Namibia	28:17
126	Mikael Aigroz	Switzerland	28:18
127	Michal Šneberger	Czech Republic	28:18
128	Oleg Gutnik	Belarus	28:19
129	Mehdi Baala	France	28:20
130	Slavko Petrović	Croatia	28:21
131	Fouad Obad	Yemen	28:23
132	G.S. Hariraju	India	28:28
133	P.K. Mishra	India	28:29
134	Simo Simatu	South Africa	28:37
135	Matthew Mechin	United Kingdom	28:45
136	Jeff Gorman	Canada	28:46
137	Norbert Kömüves	Hungary	28:50
138	Steve Osadiuk	Canada	28:51
139	Omar Bekkali	Belgium	28:54
140	Peter Knuchel	Switzerland	28:59
141	Cristobal Valenzuela	Argentina	28:59
142	Kevin Zammit	Malta	29:11
143	Sergey Sviridenok	Belarus	29:15
144	Mindaugas Pukstas	Lithuania	29:19
145	Hikmat Dastan	Turkey	29:20
146	Kaupo Tiislär	Estonia	29:20
147	Scott Allison	Canada	29:20
148	Desiré Tandrayen	Mauritius	29:24
149	Gabe Jennings	United States	29:26
150	Pascal Berger	Switzerland	29:29
151	Daniel Fekl	Czech Republic	30:06
152	Patrick Albert	Mauritius	30:28
153	Baker Khadora	Palestine	30:50
154	Selwyn Bonne	Seychelles	31:18
155	Jean-Marc Dambra	Mauritius	31:28
156	Mokoilane Mojela	Lesotho	31:38
157	Abdel Awajna	Palestine	32:20
158	Ajay Bheekarry	Mauritius	33:16
159	Ala Al-Deen Fhidat	Palestine	36:04
—	Saso Njenjic	Slovenia	DNF
—	Roland Kis	Hungary	DNS
—	Abdel Salam Al Debjy	Palestine	DNS
—	Samy Asad Nateel	Palestine	DNS

==== Teams ====
Rank	Team	Points
1st place, gold medalist(s)	Kenya: Elijah Korir / 1; Paul Kosgei / 3; John Gwako / 4; Charles Kwambai / 5; (Patrick Ivuti) / (6); (Kipchumba Mitei) / (9)	13
2nd place, silver medalist(s)	Ethiopia: Million Wolde / 2; Alene Emere / 7; Yibeltal Admassu / 10; Haylu Mekonnen / 12; (Dereje Tadesse) / (14); (Mohamed Awol) / (16)	31
3rd place, bronze medalist(s)	Morocco: Ali Ezzine / 11; Adil Kaouch / 19; Abderahim Bouchlouch / 21; Hicham Lamalem / 23; (Aziz El Makhrout) / (29); (Ahmed Ezzobayry) / (39)	74
4	Japan: Hiroyuki Ogawa / 15; Shinichi Shibata / 18; Yuji Ibi / 25; Koichiro Koike / 27; (Tomoki Sugiyama) / (31); (Shoji Miyai) / (40)	85
5	Uganda: Godfrey Nyombi / 8; Jafred Lorone / 13; Ben Chesang / 32; Vincent Moroga / 82	135
6	Spain: Juan Carlos Higuero / 26; Juan José Lozano / 28; Pablo Villalobos / 36; José Bastos / 54; (Adria García) / (61); (Iván Hierro) / (93)	144
7	South Africa: Richard Mavuso / 30; Vincent Kuotane / 34; Khaya Gqotso / 35; Ben Mogola / 48; (Makhubalo Mngomezulu) / (78); (Simo Simatu) / (134)	147
8	Algeria: Ali Saïdi-Sief / 17; Abdelkarim Bouchamia / 45; Kais Bouziane / 63; Yazid Zidani / 67; (Said Ali Hadji) / (68); (Latamene Oumouhand) / (112)	192
9	Italy: Nicolò Rotondo / 33; Alberto Mosca / 47; Giuseppe Minici / 57; Claudio Brandalise / 62; (Pietro Pelusi) / (107); (Pasqualino Zammataro) / (120)	199
10	France: Bouabdallah Tahri / 22; Raymond Fontaine / 73; Hicham Anique / 80; Damien Rouquet / 87; (Olivier Mignon) / (88); (Mehdi Baala) / (129)	262
11	Mexico: Cayetano Hernandez / 44; Teodoro Barradas / 52; Gonzalo Gutierrez / 53; César Villanueva / 121	270
12	United States: Abdul Alizindani / 51; Steve Leuer / 65; Robert Leblanc / 79; Kevin Koeper / 92; (Thomas Murley) / (95); (Gabe Jennings) / (149)	287
13	Australia: Mark Thompson / 37; Clinton Mackevicius / 76; Paul Fenn / 81; Martin Dent / 96	290
14	Yemen: Anwar O.M. Ali / 20; Abdulaziz Abdulrahman / 59; Mohamed Al-Khawlani / 110; Khaled Al-Atashi / 113; (Fouad Obad) / (131)	302
15	United Kingdom: Sam Haughian / 64; Gavin Thompson / 66; Alister Moses / 83; David Mitchinson / 91; (Simon Burton) / (98); (Matthew Mechin) / (135)	304
16	Finland: Jussi Utriainen / 38; Jari Matinlauri / 89; Mikael Talasjoki / 101; Mikko Ristimäki / 106	334
17	Brazil: Luiz Paula / 43; Paulo Almeida / 69; Jonathan Matos / 114; André da Silva / 123	349
18	Hungary: Levente Timár / 49; Ferenc Békési / 58; Imre Szabó / 119; Norbert Kömüves / 137	363
19	Turkey: Halil Tekin / 70; Dilaver Kanber / 90; Yusuf Zepak / 99; Hikmat Dastan / 145	404
20	Lesotho: Kelebone Makoetlane / 55; Mokhejano Lesenyeho / 100; Tsiliso Raletsatsi / 111; Mokoilane Mojela / 156	422
21	Canada: Paul Morrison / 71; Drew Graham / 108; Bruce Wright / 115; Jeff Gorman / 136; (Steve Osadiuk) / (138); (Scott Allison) / (147)	430
22	Belarus: Igor Teteryukov / 77; Viktor Lomonosov / 84; Oleg Gutnik / 128; Sergey Sviridenok / 143	432
23	India: Arun D'Souza / 104; Ganpati Bhusanur / 116; G.S. Hariraju / 132; P.K. Mishra / 133	485
24	Switzerland: Jérôme Schaffner / 117; Pierre-André Ramuz / 122; Mikael Aigroz / 126; Peter Knuchel / 140; (Pascal Berger) / (150)	505
25	Czech Republic: Libor Flemr / 118; David Arabasz / 124; Michal Šneberger / 127; Daniel Fekl / 151	520
26	Mauritius: Desiré Tandrayen / 148; Patrick Albert / 152; Jean-Marc Dambra / 155; Ajay Bheekarry / 158	613

- Note: Athletes in parentheses did not score for the team result

== Participation ==
An unofficial count yields the participation of 160 athletes from 48 countries in the Junior men's race. This is in agreement with the official numbers as published.

- Algeria (6)
- Andorra (1)
- Argentina (3)
- Australia (4)
- Belarus (4)
- Belgium (3)
- Botswana (1)
- Brazil (4)
- Canada (6)
- Croatia (1)
- Czech Republic (4)
- Estonia (1)
- Ethiopia (6)
- Finland (4)
- France (6)
- Hungary (4)
- India (4)
- Ireland (1)
- Israel (1)
- Italy (6)
- Japan (6)
- Kazakhstan (1)
- Kenya (6)
- Lesotho (4)
- Lithuania (1)
- Malta (1)
- Mauritius (4)
- Mexico (4)
- Morocco (6)
- Namibia (3)
- Netherlands (1)
- Palestine (3)
- Poland (1)
- Portugal (1)
- Romania (1)
- Russia (1)
- Seychelles (1)
- Slovenia (1)
- South Africa (6)
- Spain (6)
- Switzerland (5)
- Tanzania (1)
- Turkey (4)
- Uganda (4)
- United Kingdom (6)
- United States (6)
- Yemen (5)
- Zimbabwe (1)

== See also ==
- 1997 IAAF World Cross Country Championships – Senior men's race
- 1997 IAAF World Cross Country Championships – Senior women's race
- 1997 IAAF World Cross Country Championships – Junior women's race
