= Xandru Grech =

Maltese athlete

Personal information
- Born: October 11, 1974 (age 51)

Sport
- Sport: Track and field

Alexsander "Xandru" Grech is a Maltese athlete, athletics coach, media personality and entrepreneur.

== Personal life ==
Xandru Grech was born on October 11, 1974, to parents Louis Grech and Maria Grech Ganado.

Xandru attended St Edwards College, Malta and graduated from the University of Malta with a degree in Communications. He is a qualified Power Plate instructor and IAAF Level 4 Athletics Coach. He is also President of Malta Coaches Athletics Association.

== Athletics career ==
He began his career in athletics at the very early age of 9 years to become one of Malta's most recognized middle distance runners registering National records in the 800m and 1500m at the Small Nations Games in 1995 held in Luxembourg. In that same year he qualified for the 1995 World Championships in Athletics - Men's 1500m. He formed part of the Maltese team at the 1997 IAAF World Cross Country Championships – Senior men's race held in Torino, Italy where he achieved his last recorded result on an international level. Grech continues to be actively involved in athletics through coaching, sport event organisation, and philanthropic activity.

In 2019, he was instrumental, as part of Malta's organizing team, to introduce the Superleague Triathlon to Malta. He continues his passion for fitness and sport through his Move Fitness Centers in Malta.

== Media personality ==
Grech has hosted various TV programmes and ceremonies in Malta and is a regular guest on many TV and Radio Shows. He is actively involved in various philanthropic events and social awareness campaigns.

In 2009 he featured in the tongue-in-cheek Maltese feature film, Maltageddon and a year later in Malta Force Cinema in 2010. He is brand ambassador for Iniala, the co-founders and organizers of the Malta Social Impact Awards and Inspirasia Foundation

On 3 May 2020, he hosted Malta Together - A Festival of Gratitude and Inspiration, an online and TV music festival featuring leading Maltese singers and musicians with the aim of bringing the country together during the COVID-19 pandemic. He is an active member of Malta Together - a community platform founded by Inspirasia Foundation created to help people in Malta live their lives better during the COVID-19 pandemic, by providing access to support, activities, entertainment, and useful services.
