= Maghreb Championships =

There have been several sports events known as the Maghreb Championships, including:

- Maghreb Athletics Championships, a defunct athletics competition
- Maghreb Champions Cup, a defunct football competition
- Maghreb Cup Winners Cup, a defunct football competition
- Maghreb Cross Country Championships, a cross country running competition
- Maghreb Judo Youth Championships, a judo competition for judoka aged under 18

== See also ==
- North African Championship, a former football competition between French Algeria, French Morocco and French Tunisia
