= Wei Li (runner) =

Chinese former long-distance runner (born 1972)

Medal record

Women's athletics

Representing China

East Asian Games
Silver medal – second place	1997 Busan	5000 m

IAAF World Cup
Bronze medal – third place	1994 London	10,000 m

Wei Li (Chinese: 魏麗; born 29 June 1972) is a Chinese former long-distance runner. She was a medallist at the 1994 IAAF World Cup and the 1997 East Asian Games. She represented China at the 1996 Atlanta Olympics, the 1997 World Championships in Athletics and the 1997 IAAF World Cross Country Championships. She was twice a Chinese national champion.

== Career ==
Wei first came to prominence at nation level with a 5000 metres win at the Chinese Athletics Championships in 1992. She achieved a personal best of 31.28.83 minutes for the 10,000 metres at the 1993 Chinese National Games and even though this only ranked her seventh in the race, such was the quality she placed ninth on the global rankings that year (the winner Wang Junxia broke the world record). She won her second national title at the 1993 Chinese Championships, taking the 1500 metres.

At the start of the 1994 season she was runner-up at the Chiba International Cross Country and won her leg of the Yokohama International Women's Ekiden. She won the only global medal of her career at the 1994 IAAF World Cup that September, taking the 10,000 m bronze behind Elana Meyer and Fernanda Ribeiro. In 1995 she came third in the 10,000 m at the national championships and came in second place at the Sanyo Women's Road Race and her leg of the Chiba International Ekiden. After taking second in the 5000 m and fourth in the 10,000 m at the 1996 Chinese Championships, she was selected for China at the 1996 Summer Olympics. Her compatriot Wang Junxia went on to win the title but Wei failed to reach the final round.

Three international appearances came for Wei in the 1997 season. Beginning with the 1997 IAAF World Cross Country Championships, she placed 41st to lead the Chinese women's team to 13th place. After a successful tour of Japan, winning at the Osaka Grand Prix, Shizuoka International Meet and Oda Memorial, she became China's choice for the East Asian Games – she was a silver medallist in the 5000 m, having narrowly lost to Harumi Hiroyama. In her last major outing, she placed ninth in the 5000 m final at the 1997 World Championships in Athletics.

She failed to perform well at the 1997 Chinese National Games and shortly after made her debut over the marathon distance, taking ninth at the Dalian Marathon with a time of 2:45:49 hours. In her last outing for China, she was seventh on her leg of the Chiba Ekiden. Her last high national placing was third in the 5000 m at the 1999 Chinese Championships. She retired in early 2000, at the age of 27.

== International competitions ==
Year	Competition	Venue	Position	Event	Notes
1994	IAAF World Cup	London, United Kingdom	3rd	10,000 m	32:37.94
1996	Olympic Games	Atlanta, United States	5th (heats)	5000 m	15:33.49
1997	World Cross Country Championships	Turin, Italy	41st	Senior race	22:11
1997	World Cross Country Championships	Turin, Italy	13th	Senior team	264 pts
1997	East Asian Games	Busan, South Korea	2nd	5000 m	15:38.73
1997	World Championships	Athens, Greece	9th	5000 m	15:24.04

== National titles ==
- Chinese Athletics Championships
  - 1500 m: 1993
  - 5000 m: 1992
