= Murari Pasavan =

Indian politician

Member of the Bihar Legislative Assembly
- In office 14 November 2025 – Incumbent
- Preceded by: Lalan Kumar
- Constituency: Pirpainti

Personal details
- Born: Bihar
- Party: Bharatiya Janata Party
- Profession: Politician

Murari Pasavan is an Indian politician from Bihar. He is elected as a Member of Legislative Assembly in 2025 Bihar Legislative Assembly election from Pirpainti constituency.

== Political career ==
Murari Pasavan won from Pirpainti constituency representing Bharatiya Janata Party in the 2025 Bihar Legislative Assembly election. He polled 1,40,608 votes and defeated his nearest rival, Ram Vilash Paswan of Rashtriya Janata Dal, by a margin of 53,107 votes.
