= Marie Davenport =

Irish long-distance runner

- Born: Marie McMahon; 24 January 1975 (age 51); Ennistymon, Ireland
- Occupation: long-distance runner

Marie Davenport (born as Marie McMahon in Ennistymon) is a long-distance runner from Ireland. She first took part in the 1996 Summer Olympics as a participant in the 5,000 metres, and later in the 2004 Summer Olympics.

Davenport did not advance out of the first heat of the women's 5000 meters in the 1996 Atlanta games. She ran 15:59 for 5K in her debut games at the age of 19.

Davenport finished 14th in the 2004 Olympic 10,000m final in a time of 31:50.

Davenport was a 10-time NCAA All-American, NCAA Champion in the indoor 5000m, and led Providence College to their first NCAA team title in women's cross country in 1995.

Davenport was an eight-time Big East Champion while attending Providence College. She also won the 5000 meters at the Penn Relays three years in a row. Davenport was inducted into the Providence College Hall of Fame in 2009.

Davenport won the BAA Half Marathon in a then course record time of 1:10:57. She won the race again in 2006 in 1:12:10.

Davenport ran 2:33 for 16th place in the 2005 New York City Marathon.

Davenport's time of 31:28 for 10,000m ranks 3rd all time for Ireland behind Sonia O'Sullivan and Catherina McKiernan.

Davenport finished 23rd in the 1996 Cross Country World Championships held in South Africa.

Davenport finished 45th in the 2002 Cross Country World Championships and 77th in the 1999 World Championships.

Davenport won the Women's Boston Tufts 10K in a time of 32:48 ahead of Ethiopian Genet Gebregiorgis in 2004.

Davenport won the CVS Downtown 5K in 15:19 to take home the $5000 prize.

After retiring from competitive running, Marie finished 4th in the Masters Division of the Boston Marathon in 2015 in the freezing rain. She ran 2:49 despite running alone into a headwind for the last 12 miles. This was Marie's last competitive race.

Davenport was issued a warning by the IOC for taking a cold medicine for a stuffy nose without giving notification to her team doctor during the 1996 Olympics. The medicine was not on an IOC banned list and only required an athlete's declaration. The Irish newspapers wrongly reported that Marie could face a four-year ban which created a media frenzy. She was cleared of any wrongdoing.

Davenport planned to compete in the New York City Marathon in 2005, but was prevented by injury. She won the Women's Mini Marathon, Dublin in 2007. In 2012 she came second in the Guilford Frosty 5K.

Davenport attended Providence College, and, as of 2012, was living with her husband and children in Guilford, Baltimore, United States.
