= Brian Baker (runner) =

American long-distance runner (born 1970)

Personal information
- Born: 8 June 1970 (age 55) Batesville, Arkansas, U.S.

Sport
- Sport: Track and field
- Club: Arkansas Razorbacks

Brian Baker (born 8 June 1970) is a retired American long-distance runner and current coach at Gardner-Webb University.

== Early career ==
Baker was born and raised in Batesville, Arkansas, and competed in his prep career at Batesville High School. He holds the state high school record in the 3200 meter run with 9:09.80 minutes. He was also a two-time state champion in the 1600 and 3200 meter run events.

Baker ran collegiately at the University of Arkansas, winning team national titles in 1990 (indoor track and cross country), 1991 (indoor), 1992 (cross country, indoor and outdoor) and 1993 (cross country, indoor and outdoor). He won the NCAA Outdoor 5000-meter run in 1994 and ran a leg on the winning indoor distance medley relay team the same year.

Baker won two individual SEC conference cross country titles and two conferences titles in the 5000 meter run during his career at Arkansas. Baker's team won twelve total conference championships during his career and he was a seven time All-American.

== International career ==
After graduating in 1994, Baker continued a professional running career with New Balance. In 1995, he finished tenth in the 5000 meters at the 1995 Summer Universiade. He was also a member of the United States World Cross Country team in 1996 and 1997.

At the 1996 World Cross Country Championships, Baker finished 41st in the long race and 13th in the team competition. At the 1997 World Cross Country Championships, he finished 98th in the long race and 11th in the team competition.

Baker then competed in the 5000 meters at the 1997 World Championships, without reaching the final, and finished tenth in the 3000 meters at the 1999 World Indoor Championships. He finished fourth in the 5000 meters at the Pan American Games in Winnipeg.

Baker's personal best times were 3:57.4 in the mile run, achieved in May 1999 in Attleboro; 7:43.88 minutes in the 3000 meters, achieved in August 1998 in Hechtel; and 13:28.62 minutes in the 5000 meters, achieved in June 2000 in Dedham.

== Coaching career ==
He is currently a head coach for the track and field teams at Gardner-Webb University. In June 2004, Baker was inducted into the Arkansas Track and Field Hall of Fame.
