= 1997 IAAF World Cross Country Championships =

Coordinates: 45°03′03″N 7°41′08″E

- Organisers: IAAF
- Edition: 25th
- Date: 23 March
- Host city: Turin, Piemonte, Italy
- Venue: Parco del Valentino
- Events: 4
- Distances: 12.333 km – Senior men 8.511 km – Junior men 6.6 km – Senior women 4.689 km – Junior women
- Participation: 725 athletes from 72 nations

The 1997 IAAF World Cross Country Championships took place on 23 March 1997. The races were held at the Parco del Valentino in Turin, Italy. A report of the event was given in The New York Times, in the Herald, and for the IAAF.

Complete results for senior men, junior men, senior women, junior women, medallists, and the results of British athletes who took part were published.

== Medallists ==
Event	Gold		Silver		Bronze	
Individual
Senior men (12.333 km)	Paul Tergat; Kenya	35:11	Salah Hissou; Morocco	35:13	Tom Nyariki; Kenya	35:20
Junior men (8.511 km)	Elijah Korir; Kenya	24:21	Million Wolde; Ethiopia	24:28	Paul Kosgei; Kenya	24:29
Senior women (6.6 km)	Derartu Tulu; Ethiopia	20:53	Paula Radcliffe; United Kingdom	20:55	Gete Wami; Ethiopia	21:00
Junior women (4.689 km)	Rose Kosgei; Kenya	14:58	Prisca Ngetich; Kenya	14:59	Ayelech Worku; Ethiopia	15:02
Team
Senior men	Kenya	51	Morocco	70	Ethiopia	125
Junior men	Kenya	13	Ethiopia	31	Morocco	74
Senior women	Ethiopia	24	Kenya	34	Ireland	64
Junior women	Kenya	15	Japan	38	Ethiopia	39

== Race results ==
=== Senior men's race (12.333 km) ===
Individual race
Rank	Athlete	Country	Time
1st place, gold medalist(s)	Paul Tergat	Kenya	35:11
2nd place, silver medalist(s)	Salah Hissou	Morocco	35:13
3rd place, bronze medalist(s)	Tom Nyariki	Kenya	35:20
4	Paul Koech	Kenya	35:23
5	Mohammed Mourhit	Belgium	35:35
6	Bernard Barmasai^{†}	Kenya	35:35
7	Joseph Kibor	Kenya	35:37
8	Smail Sghir	Morocco	35:56
9	Julio Rey	Spain	35:57
10	Khaled Boulami	Morocco	35:59
11	Habte Jifar	Ethiopia	35:59
12	El Hassan Lahssini	Morocco	36:01
Full results

^{†}: Athlete marked in the results list as nonscorer.

Teams
Rank	Team	Points
1st place, gold medalist(s)	Kenya: Paul Tergat / 1; Tom Nyariki / 3; Paul Koech / 4; Joseph Kibor / 7; Joshua Chelanga / 17; Shem Kororia / 19; (Benjamin Koskei) / (24); (William Kiptum) / (28); (John Kosgei) / (47)	51
2nd place, silver medalist(s)	Morocco: Salah Hissou / 2; Smail Sghir / 8; Khaled Boulami / 10; El Hassan Lahssini / 12; Elarbi Khattabi / 16; Brahim Boulami / 22; (Abderrahim Zitouna) / (35); (Abdelaziz Sahere) / (70); (Mustapha Bamouh) / (82)	70
3rd place, bronze medalist(s)	Ethiopia: Habte Jifar / 11; Assefa Mezegebu / 13; Ayele Mezegebu / 18; Abraham Assefa / 23; Girma Tolla / 27; Tegenu Abebe / 33; (Ibrahim Seid) / (36); (Lemi Erpassa) / (68); (Tesgie Legesse) / (129)	125
4	Portugal	263
5	Spain	275
6	United Kingdom	325
7	Italy	344
8	Algeria	423
Full results

- Note: Athletes in parentheses did not score for the team result

=== Junior men's race (8.511 km) ===
Individual race
Rank	Athlete	Country	Time
1st place, gold medalist(s)	Elijah Korir	Kenya	24:21
2nd place, silver medalist(s)	Million Wolde	Ethiopia	24:28
3rd place, bronze medalist(s)	Paul Kosgei	Kenya	24:29
4	John Gwako	Kenya	24:58
5	Charles Kwambai	Kenya	25:02
6	Patrick Ivuti	Kenya	25:06
7	Alene Emere	Ethiopia	25:10
8	Godfrey Nyombi	Uganda	25:14
9	Kipchumba Mitei	Kenya	25:20
10	Yibeltal Admassu	Ethiopia	25:22
11	Ali Ezzine	Morocco	25:24
12	Haylu Mekonnen	Ethiopia	25:25
Full results

Teams
Rank	Team	Points
1st place, gold medalist(s)	Kenya: Elijah Korir / 1; Paul Kosgei / 3; John Gwako / 4; Charles Kwambai / 5; (Patrick Ivuti) / (6); (Kipchumba Mitei) / (9)	13
2nd place, silver medalist(s)	Ethiopia: Million Wolde / 2; Alene Emere / 7; Yibeltal Admassu / 10; Haylu Mekonnen / 12; (Dereje Tadesse) / (14); (Mohamed Awol) / (16)	31
3rd place, bronze medalist(s)	Morocco: Ali Ezzine / 11; Adil Kaouch / 19; Abderahim Bouchlouch / 21; Hicham Lamalem / 23; (Aziz El Makhrout) / (29); (Ahmed Ezzobayry) / (39)	74
4	Japan	85
5	Uganda	135
6	Spain	144
7	South Africa	147
8	Algeria	192
Full results

- Note: Athletes in parentheses did not score for the team result

=== Senior women's race (6.6 km) ===
Individual race
Rank	Athlete	Country	Time
1st place, gold medalist(s)	Derartu Tulu	Ethiopia	20:53
2nd place, silver medalist(s)	Paula Radcliffe	United Kingdom	20:55
3rd place, bronze medalist(s)	Gete Wami	Ethiopia	21:00
4	Julia Vaquero	Spain	21:01
5	Sally Barsosio	Kenya	21:05
6	Merima Denboba	Ethiopia	21:18
7	Catherina McKiernan	Ireland	21:20
8	Naomi Mugo	Kenya	21:23
9	Sonia O'Sullivan	Ireland	21:25
10	Jane Omoro	Kenya	21:29
11	Lydia Cheromei	Kenya	21:34
12	Elena Fidatof	Romania	21:35
Full results

Teams
Rank	Team	Points
1st place, gold medalist(s)	Ethiopia: Derartu Tulu / 1; Gete Wami / 3; Merima Denboba / 6; Berhane Adere / 14; (Getenesh Urge) / (27); (Kore Alemu) / (54)	24
2nd place, silver medalist(s)	Kenya: Sally Barsosio / 5; Naomi Mugo / 8; Jane Omoro / 10; Lydia Cheromei / 11; (Florence Barsosio) / (13); (Susan Chepkemei) / (19)	34
3rd place, bronze medalist(s)	Ireland: Catherina McKiernan / 7; Sonia O'Sullivan / 9; Valerie Vaughan / 23; Una English / 25; (Maureen Harrington) / (108); (Pauline Curley) / (117)	64
4	United Kingdom	98
5	Japan	100
6	United States	128
7	France	148
8	Italy	160
Full results

- Note: Athletes in parentheses did not score for the team result

=== Junior women's race (4.689 km) ===
Individual race
Rank	Athlete	Country	Time
1st place, gold medalist(s)	Rose Kosgei	Kenya	14:58
2nd place, silver medalist(s)	Prisca Ngetich	Kenya	14:59
3rd place, bronze medalist(s)	Ayelech Worku	Ethiopia	15:02
4	Edna Kiplagat	Kenya	15:10
5	Zenebech Tadese	Ethiopia	15:11
6	Kei Satomura	Japan	15:12
7	Emiko Kojima	Japan	15:12
8	Caroline Tarus	Kenya	15:14
9	Anita Kiptum	Kenya	15:15
10	Agnes Kiprop	Kenya	15:15
11	Risa Tanaka	Japan	15:20
12	René Kalmer	South Africa	15:31
Full results

Teams
Rank	Team	Points
1st place, gold medalist(s)	Kenya: Rose Kosgei / 1; Prisca Ngetich / 2; Edna Kiplagat / 4; Caroline Tarus / 8; (Anita Kiptum) / (9); (Agnes Kiprop) / (10)	15
2nd place, silver medalist(s)	Japan: Kei Satomura / 6; Emiko Kojima / 7; Risa Tanaka / 11; Tomoko Hashimoto / 14; (Kumiko Hiyama) / (16); (Yuka Hata) / (17)	38
3rd place, bronze medalist(s)	Ethiopia: Ayelech Worku / 3; Zenebech Tadese / 5; Worknesh Kidane / 13; Etaferahu Tarekegn / 18; (Kutre Dulecha) / (20); (Merima Hashim) / (23)	39
4	Morocco	107
5	South Africa	141
6	Spain	151
7	Russia	165
8	Germany	206
Full results

- Note: Athletes in parentheses did not score for the team result

== Medal table (unofficial) ==
Rank	Nation	Gold	Silver	Bronze	Total
1	Kenya	6	2	2	10
2	Ethiopia	2	2	4	8
3	Morocco	0	2	1	3
4	Great Britain	0	1	0	1
4	Japan	0	1	0	1
6	Ireland	0	0	1	1
Totals (6 entries)		8	8	8	24

- Note: Totals include both individual and team medals, with medals in the team competition counting as one medal.

== Participation ==
An unofficial count yields the participation of 725 athletes from 72 countries. This is in agreement with the official numbers as published. Although announced, athletes from Sierra Leone did not show.

- Algeria (23)
- Andorra (1)
- Angola (2)
- Argentina (3)
- Australia (17)
- Belarus (5)
- Belgium (14)
- Botswana (3)
- Brazil (19)
- Bulgaria (2)
- Burundi (1)
- Cameroon (6)
- Canada (23)
- Central African Republic (1)
- Chile (4)
- China (9)
- Colombia (10)
- Congo (2)
- Croatia (4)
- Czech Republic (5)
- Equatorial Guinea (1)
- Estonia (7)
- Ethiopia (27)
- Finland (16)
- France (27)
- Germany (5)
- Hong Kong (1)
- Hungary (20)
- India (18)
- Ireland (10)
- Israel (3)
- Italy (27)
- Ivory Coast (2)
- Jamaica (3)
- Japan (22)
- Kazakhstan (2)
- Kenya (28)
- Kyrgyzstan (3)
- Lesotho (10)
- Lithuania (2)
- Malta (8)
- Mauritius (12)
- Mexico (18)
- Morocco (21)
- Namibia (10)
- Netherlands (13)
- New Zealand (11)
- Palestine (3)
- Poland (2)
- Portugal (17)
- Romania (13)
- Russia (12)
- Rwanda (6)
- San Marino (1)
- Seychelles (4)
- Slovakia (2)
- Slovenia (4)
- South Africa (27)
- Spain (26)
- Sweden (2)
- Switzerland (9)
- Tajikistan (3)
- Tanzania (7)
- Turkey (19)
- Turkmenistan (5)
- Uganda (4)
- Ukraine (3)
- United Kingdom (27)
- United States (27)
- Yemen (11)
- Yugoslavia (5)
- Zimbabwe (5)

== See also ==
- 1997 IAAF World Cross Country Championships – Senior men's race
- 1997 IAAF World Cross Country Championships – Junior men's race
- 1997 IAAF World Cross Country Championships – Senior women's race
- 1997 IAAF World Cross Country Championships – Junior women's race
- 1997 in athletics (track and field)
