= Jane Omoro =

Kenyan long-distance runner

Medal record

Women's athletics

Representing Kenya

Commonwealth Games
Bronze medal – third place	1994 Victoria	10,000 m

IAAF World Cross Country Championships
Gold medal – first place	1998 Marrakesh	Senior team
Silver medal – second place	1997 Turin	Senior team
Silver medal – second place	1999 Belfast	Senior team
Bronze medal – third place	2002 Dublin	Senior team
Bronze medal – third place	1994 Marrakesh	Senior team

Jane Moraa Omoro (born 12 September 1974) is a Kenyan long-distance runner who competed in cross country, track and road running events, up to the marathon. She was active from 1993 to 2007, with most of her success coming in the 1990s.

Omoro was a five time participant for Kenya at the IAAF World Cross Country Championships and won a team medal each time, including the women's team title in 1998. Individually, she placed in the top eight of the women's race on two occasions. She was a double gold medallist at the East African Cross Country Championships in 1999. She became national champion at the Kenyan Cross Country Championships in 1997.

She was the bronze medallist in the 10,000 metres at the 1994 Commonwealth Games. She was the silver medallist at the 1998 IAAF World Road Relay Championships and participated at the 1999 IAAF World Half Marathon Championships. She was highly successful on the American road racing circuit, taking wins at the Bay to Breakers, Bolder Boulder, Lilac Bloomsday Run and Cherry Blossom Ten Mile Run, among others. In marathon running, she was a two-time winner at the Mombasa Marathon and also won the Beirut Marathon.

== Personal bests ==
- 5000 metres – 15:42.00 min (1997)
- 10,000 metres – 32:13.01 min (1994)
- 10K run – 31:06 min (1994)
- Half marathon – 70:36 min (2003)
- Marathon – 2:38:55 (2005)

All information from All-Athletics profile

== International competitions ==
Year	Competition	Venue	Position	Event	Notes
1994	World Cross Country Championships	Budapest, Hungary	25th	Senior race	21:32
1994	World Cross Country Championships	Budapest, Hungary	3rd	Senior team	75 pts
1994	Commonwealth Games	Victoria, Canada	3rd	10,000 m	32:13.01
1997	World Cross Country Championships	Turin, Italy	10th	Senior race	21:29
1997	World Cross Country Championships	Turin, Italy	2nd	Senior team	34 pts
1998	World Cross Country Championships	Marrakesh, Morocco	7th	Senior race	26:07
1998	World Cross Country Championships	Marrakesh, Morocco	1st	Senior team	30 pts
1998	IAAF World Road Relay Championships	Manaus, Brazil	2nd	Marathon relay	2:21:49
1999	East African Cross Country Championships	Moshi, Tanzania	1st	Senior race	27:40
1999	East African Cross Country Championships	Moshi, Tanzania	1st	Senior team	16 pts
1999	World Cross Country Championships	Belfast, United Kingdom	6th	Senior race	28:29
1999	World Cross Country Championships	Belfast, United Kingdom	2nd	Senior team	27 pts
1999	IAAF World Half Marathon Championships	Palermo, Italy	20th	Half marathon	1:12:10
2002	World Cross Country Championships	Dublin, Ireland	14th	Senior race	27:52
2002	World Cross Country Championships	Dublin, Ireland	3rd	Senior team	41 pts

== National titles ==
- Kenyan Cross Country Championships
  - Senior race: 1997

== Road race wins ==
- Steamboat Classic: 1994
- Great Cow Harbor 10K: 1994
- Arturo Barrios Invitational: 1997
- Bay to Breakers: 1997, 1998
- Phoenix 10K: 1997, 1998
- Crescent City Classic: 1998
- Bolder Boulder: 1998
- Wharf to Wharf Race: 1998
- Lilac Bloomsday Run: 1998, 1999, 2000
- Cherry Blossom Ten Mile Run: 1999
- Azalea Trail Run: 2000
- Mombasa Marathon: 2002, 2004
- Hastings Half Marathon: 2003
- Peterborough Half Marathon: 2003
- Beirut Marathon: 2005
