= Mini marathon =

Type of running race

A mini marathon is a long-distance road race of a distance which is less than a marathon. The term is sometimes used in place of "half marathon" (500 Festival Mini-Marathon in Indianapolis), but can also be applied to races of other distances such as 5 km (Beirut mini-marathon) or 10 km (Dublin Women's Mini Marathon). Mini-marathons may be run as side events to marathons or as events in their own right.

One of the first events to use the name was the New York Mini Marathon, a women-only race first held in 1972. The Dublin Women's Mini Marathon started in 1983 and is one of the largest events of its kind in the world. A separate event from the Dublin Marathon, it has had some 600,000 entrants since its inception in 1983.
