= African Southern Region Championships =

African Southern Region Championships may refer to:

- African Southern Region Athletics Championships
- African Southern Region Half Marathon Championships
- African Southern Region Cross Country Championships
- African Zone VI Athletics Championships (later known as Southern Region)
- African Zone VI Marathon Championships (later known as Southern Region)
