= Pirpainti Assembly constituency =

Constituency of the Bihar legislative assembly in India

- Constituency No. 154 for the Bihar Legislative Assembly

Constituency details
- Country: India
- Region: East India
- State: Bihar
- District: Bhagalpur
- Established: 1951
- Total electors: 345,572

Member of Legislative Assembly
- 18th Bihar Legislative Assembly
- Incumbent Murari Paswan
- Party: BJP
- Alliance: NDA
- Elected year: 2025

Pirpainti is one of 243 constituencies of the Bihar Legislative Assembly in India. It is part of the Bhagalpur Lok Sabha constituency along with other assembly constituencies viz Gopalpur, Bihpur, Kahalgaon, Bhagalpur and Nathnagar.

== Overview ==
Pirpainti comprises CD Block Pirpainti; Gram Panchayats KAIRIA, Bansipur, Birbanna, Rampur, Krisndaspur, Mohanpur Gogatta, Antichuck, Oriap,Mathurapur, Ramjanipur, Ghogha, Ekdara, Lagma, Salempur Saini, Kurma, Nandlalpur, Siya & Sadanandpur Baisa of Kahalgaon CD Block.

== Members of the Legislative Assembly ==
Year	Name	Party
1952	Siyaram Singh	Indian National Congress
1957	Ramjanam Mahto	Indian National Congress
1962	Baikunth Ram	Indian National Congress
1967	Ambika Prasad	Communist Party of India
1969	Ambika Prasad	Communist Party of India
1972	Ambika Prasad	Communist Party of India
1977	Ambika Prasad	Communist Party of India
1980	Dilip Kumar Sinha	Indian National Congress
1985	Dilip Kumar Sinha	Indian National Congress
1990	Ambika Prasad	Communist Party of India
1995	Ambika Prasad	Communist Party of India
2000	Shobhakant Mandal	Rashtriya Janata Dal
2005	Shobhakant Mandal	Rashtriya Janata Dal
2005	Shobhakant Mandal	Rashtriya Janata Dal
2010	Aman Kumar	Bharatiya Janata Party
2015	Ram Vilash Paswan	Rashtriya Janata Dal
2020	Lalan Kumar	Bharatiya Janata Party
2025	Murari Paswan	Bharatiya Janata Party

== Election results ==
=== 2025 ===
2025 Bihar Legislative Assembly election: Pirpainti
Party	Candidate	Votes	%	±%
BJP	Murari Pasavan	140,608	56.81	+8.27
RJD	Ram Vilash Pasavan	87,501	35.36	+0.45
JSP	Ghanshyam Das	5,644	2.28	
Independent	Rahul Kumar Paswan	2,533	1.02	
Independent	Ashok Kumar Paswan	2,303	0.93	
NOTA	None of the above	2,736	1.11	+0.61
Majority		53,107	21.45	+7.82
Turnout		247,489	71.62	+12.6
BJP hold		Swing		

=== 2020 ===
2020 Bihar Legislative Assembly election: Pirpainti
Party	Candidate	Votes	%	±%
BJP	Lalan Kumar	96,229	48.54	+6.25
RJD	Ram Vilash Paswan	69,210	34.91	−10.29
Independent	Aman Kumar	12,720	6.42	
Independent	Awadh Kishor Bharti	4,030	2.03	
Independent	Ajay Kumar Paswan	2,491	1.26	
NCP	Bishnudev Kumar Paswan	1,917	0.97	
NOTA	None of the above	993	0.5	−1.84
Majority		27,019	13.63	+10.72
Turnout		198,249	59.02	+1.47
BJP gain from RJD		Swing		

=== 2015 ===
Bihar Assembly election, 2015: Pirpainti
Party	Candidate	Votes	%	±%
RJD	Ram Vilash Paswan	80,058	45.2	
BJP	Lalan Kumar	74,914	42.29	
CPI	Hiralal Paswan	4,622	2.61	
BSP	Parveen Nag	3,103	1.75	
Independent	Sudhir Kumar	2,878	1.62	
Independent	Shivnarayan Paswan Urf Shivlal Paswan	2,210	1.25	
NOTA	None of the above	4,138	2.34	
Majority		5,144	2.91	
Turnout		177,132	57.55	

=== 2010 ===
Bihar assembly elections, 2010: Pirpainti
Party	Candidate	Votes	%	±%
BJP	Aman Kumar	48493	37.56	
LJP	Shailesh Kumar	42741	33.10	
