= Mombasa Marathon =

- Date: September 27th 2015
- Location: Mombasa, Kenya
- Event type: Road
- Distance: Marathon 42KM And 10KM
- Course records: 2:12:12 (men); 2:38:44 (women); See also #Course discrepancies

The Mombasa International Marathon (formerly known as the Mombasa Marathon) is an annual marathon hosted in Mombasa, Kenya. Currently sponsored by County Government of Mombasa and Safaricom. This year the marathon prize money has been increased for the 42 km to KSh.1.5 million/= and introduced KSh.700,000/= for the 10 km. with the course's start and finish lines at Treasury Square in the city's Old Town area.

== History ==
The marathon was first run in 1985, though winner statistics for the 1985–1988 races are unknown. Daniel Nzioka holds the record for most men's wins, with 3 (1988–1991). Grace Chebet holds the record for most women's wins, also with 3 (1995, 1998–99).

The total prize fund for the 2010 race was KSh.816,000/= (£6,308.40 sterling), with the winner's prize in both men's and women's categories standing at KSh.200,000/= (£1,546.18 stg). The winners of the 2010 race were James Kariuki Mbugua and Tabitha Kibet, with times of 02:08:05 and 02:36:04 respectively.

== Past winners ==
Key: Course record • Short course • † = Long course

Edition	Year	Men's winner	Time (h:m:s)	Women's winner	Time (h:m:s)
1st	1985 – 1988 Winners unknown				
2nd	1985 – 1988 Winners unknown				
3rd	1985 – 1988 Winners unknown				
4th	1985 – 1988 Winners unknown				
5th	1989	Daniel Nzioka (KEN)	2:15:54	Florence Wangechi (KEN)	2:59:34
6th	1990	Daniel Nzioka (KEN)	2:17:06	Blanka James (TAN)	2:59:39
7th	1991	Daniel Nzioka (KEN)	2:20:09	Maria Grazia Navacchia (ITA)	2:51:41
8th	1992	Samuel Okemwa (KEN)	2:17:50	Florence Wangechi (KEN)	3:37:42
9th	1993	Nicolas Kioko (KEN)	2:13:16	?	?
10th	1994	Zachariah Nyambaso (KEN)	2:12:12	?	?
11th	1995	Abel Gisemba (KEN)	2:14:03	Grace Chebet (KEN)	3:04:35
12th	1996	?	?	?	?
13th	1997	?	?	?	?
14th	1998	Timothy Moni (KEN)	2:11:13	Grace Chebet (KEN)	2:38:44
15th	1999	Benjamin Matolo (KEN)	2:11:09	Grace Chebet (KEN)	2:34:00
16th	2000	?	?	?	?
17th	2001	?	?	?	?
18th	2002	Josephat Kipchoge Rop (KEN)	2:13:57	?	?
19th	2003	?	?	?	?
20th	2004	Alex Malinga (UGA)	2:22:01 †	Jane Omoro (KEN)	3:08:13 †
21st	2005	Johnstone Kemboi (KEN)	2:12:08	Oliver Mugoma (KEN)	2:49:30
22nd	2006	Philip Kemei (KEN)	2:11:06	Jane Wandahi (KEN)	2:39:53
23rd	2007	Peter Kemboi (KEN)	2:09:21	Juliet Chepchirchir (KEN)	2:52:49
24th	2008	Peter Mutisiya (KEN)	2:12:46	Phyllis Chelegat (KEN)	2:49:16
25th	2009	Amos Choge (KEN)	2:13:44	Nelly Cheptoo (KEN)	2:54:38
26th	2010	James Kariuki Mbugua (KEN)	2:08:05	Tabitha Kibet (KEN)	2:36:04
27th	2011	Wilson Loyanai (KEN)	2:13:00	Rose Kerubo Nyangacha (KEN)	2:39:01

=== Course discrepancies ===
Since 1999, the course route has been shorter than standard. During the 2004 race, the runners went off-course; reports suggested that the runners may have covered an additional 5 kilometres (3.1 mi).
