= East African Cross Country Championships =

- Genre: cross country running
- Date: February
- Frequency: annual
- Venue: varies
- Participants: East African nations
- Organiser: Confederation of African Athletics

The East African Cross Country Championships, also known as the Eastern Africa Cross Country Championships, is an international cross country running competition between the nations of East Africa, organised by the Confederation of African Athletics (CAA). It is typically held over one day in February and features a senior and junior race for both men and women. All four races contain an individual and team competition. Senior short course races were also held during the period where that event was present at the IAAF World Cross Country Championships.

The competition was hosted within the Jan Meda International Cross Country in 2004 and 2009. The 2013 edition was due to be held in Uganda, but was cancelled due to concerns around the 2013 Kenyan general election.

It is one of three regional cross country championships organised by the CAA, alongside the North and African Southern Region Cross Country Championships.

== Editions ==
Edition	Year	City	Country	Date	Nations	Ref.
	1999	Moshi	Tanzania			
	2001	Khartoum	Sudan			
21	2004	Addis Ababa	Ethiopia			
22	2005	Nairobi	Kenya			
23	2006	Entebbe	Uganda			
	2008	Moshi	Tanzania			
	2009	Addis Ababa	Ethiopia			
	2015	Kigali	Rwanda	22 February		
	2017	Kampala	Uganda	26 March		

== Champions ==
=== Men long course ===
- 1999: John Nada Saya (TAN)
- 2001: Enock Mitei (KEN)
- 2004: Gebregziabher Gebremariam (ETH)
- 2005: Richard Limo (KEN)
- 2006: Isaac Kiprop (UGA)

=== Men short course ===
- 2004: Dejene Berhanu (ETH)
- 2005: Dennis Ndiso (KEN)
- 2006: Martin Sulle (TAN)

=== Men junior ===
- 1999: Faustine Saktay (TAN)
- 2001: Eshetu Gezahegne (ETH)
- 2004: Mulugeta Wendimu (ETH)
- 2005: Edwin Soi (KEN)
- 2006: Samuel Ndungu (KEN)

=== Women long course ===
- 1999: Jane Omoro (KEN)
- 2001: Winfrida Kwamboka (KEN)
- 2004: Werknesh Kidane (ETH)
- 2005: Doris Changeywo (KEN)
- 2006: Tereza Yohannes (ETH)

=== Women short course ===
- 2004: Werknesh Kidane (ETH)
- 2005: Nancy Wambui (KEN)
- 2006: Jane Suuto (UGA)

=== Women junior ===
- 1999: Theresa Wanjiku (KEN)
- 2001: Letay Negash (ETH)
- 2004: Meselech Melkamu (ETH)
- 2005: Mutwa Sammy (KEN)
- 2006: Veronica Njeri (KEN)

== Participation ==
- Djibouti
- Kenya
- Egypt
- Eritrea
- Ethiopia
- Rwanda
- Somalia
- Sudan
- Tanzania
- Uganda
