= North African Cross Country Championships =

- Genre: cross country running
- Date: February
- Frequency: annual
- Venue: varies
- Participants: North African nations
- Organiser: Confederation of African Athletics

The North African Cross Country Championships is an international cross country running competition between the nations of North Africa, organised by the Confederation of African Athletics (CAA). It is typically held over one day in February and features a senior and junior race for both men and women. All four races contain an individual and team competition. Senior short course races were also held during the period where that event was present at the IAAF World Cross Country Championships.

The competition traces its history back to the Maghreb Cross Country Championships organised by the Union des Fédérations d'Athlétisme du Maghreb Uni, and later obtained North African championship status.

It is one of three regional cross country championships organised by the CAA, alongside the East and African Southern Region Cross Country Championships.

== Editions ==
Edition	Year	City	Country	Date	Nations	Ref.
17	2001	Monastir	Tunisia			
18	2002	Tripoli	Libya			
19	2003	Tizi Ouzou	Algeria			
20	2004	Rabat	Morocco			
21	2005	Jendouba	Tunisia			
22	2006	Biskra	Algeria			

== Participation ==
- Algeria
- Libya
- Morocco
- Tunisia
