= Laura Shaughnessy =

Irish long-distance runner

Personal information
- Born: 19 June 1990 (age 35)

Sport
- Country: Ireland
- Event: Long-distance running

Laura Shaughnessy (born 19 June 1990) is an Irish long-distance runner.

She competed in the women's half marathon at the 2018 IAAF World Half Marathon Championships held in Valencia, Spain. She finished in 79th place.
