= Alphonse Munyeshyaka =

Rwandan middle-distance runner

Personal information
- Nationality: Rwandan
- Born: 3 November 1974 (age 51) Rwanda

Sport
- Country: Rwanda
- Sport: Middle-distance running

Alphonse Munyeshyaka is a Rwandan Olympic middle-distance runner. He represented his country in the men's 1500 meters at the 1996 Summer Olympics. His time was a 3:58.75.
