= Catherina McKiernan =

Irish long-distance runner

Personal information
- Born: 30 November 1969 (age 56) County Cavan
- Spouse: Damien O'Reilly

Sport
- Country: Ireland

Achievements and titles
- Personal bests: Half marathon: 1:08:54 NR (Luxembourg 1998); Marathon: 2:22:23 NR (Amsterdam 1998)
Medal record
Women's athletics
Representing Ireland
World Cross Country Championships
Silver medal – second place	1992 Boston	Individual
Silver medal – second place	1993 Amorebieta	Individual
Silver medal – second place	1994 Budapest	Individual
Silver medal – second place	1995 Durham	Individual
Bronze medal – third place	1997 Turin	Team
European Cross Country Championships
Gold medal – first place	1994 Alnwick	Individual

Catherina McKiernan (born 30 November 1969 in Cornafean, County Cavan) is a former long-distance runner from Ireland, who competed in the marathon, 10,000 metres and cross country running.

== Biography ==
McKiernan has held the Women's national record for the Marathon since 1998 when she achieved a time of 2:22.23 in the Amsterdam Marathon. She has also held the national record for 15 km and the half marathon since 1997.

At the 1998 London Marathon (which she ultimately won), McKiernan suffered from runner's trots during the race.

As of 2012, McKiernan was a running instructor who offered workshops on the technique of ChiRunning.

In August 2023, she was announced as "life coach" of the senior Cavan county football team.

== Achievements ==
- 1992
  - World Cross Country Championships silver medal
- 1993
  - World Cross Country Championships silver medal
- 1994
  - World Cross Country Championships silver medal
  - European Cross Country Championships gold medal
- 1995
  - World Cross Country Championships silver medal
- 1997
  - World Cross Country Championships team bronze medal
  - Berlin Marathon winner (fastest ever debut marathon by a woman)
  - Dublin Women's Mini Marathon winner
- 1998
  - London Marathon winner
  - Amsterdam Marathon winner
  - Dublin Women's Mini Marathon winner
  - Lisbon Half Marathon winner.
- 1999
  - Dublin Women's Mini Marathon winner
  - Paris Half Marathon winner.
- 2004
  - Dublin Women's Mini Marathon winner

As well as appearing on the international stage Catherina has won national titles at:

  - 3000m (4): 1990–1993
  - 5000m (1): 1996
  - cross country (3): 1990–1992

Sporting positions
Preceded by Marleen Renders	Zevenheuvelenloop Women's Winner (15 km); 1997	Succeeded by Tegla Loroupe
