= Petra Teveli =

Hungarian marathon runner

Personal information
- Full name: Petra Prokoppne Teveli
- Nationality: Hungary
- Born: 1 November 1979 (age 46) Siófok, Hungary
- Height: 1.65 m (5 ft 5 in)
- Weight: 48 kg (106 lb)

Sport
- Sport: Athletics
- Event: Marathon
- Club: Újpest
- Coached by: Ferenc Csoma

Achievements and titles
- Personal bests: Half-marathon: 1:15:06 (2005); Marathon: 2:35:21 (2008)

Petra Prokoppne Teveli (born 1 November 1979 in Siófok) is a Hungarian marathon runner. In 2008, she set her personal best time of 2:35:21 by finishing fifth in the Turin Marathon.

Teveli represented Hungary at the 2008 Summer Olympics in Beijing, where she competed for the women's marathon. She finished the race in sixty-fifth place by just a minute ahead of Rwanda's Epiphanie Nyirabarame, with a time of 2:48:32.
