= Muzaffarpur Institute of Technology =

Engineering college in Bihar, India

Muzaffarpur Institute of technology
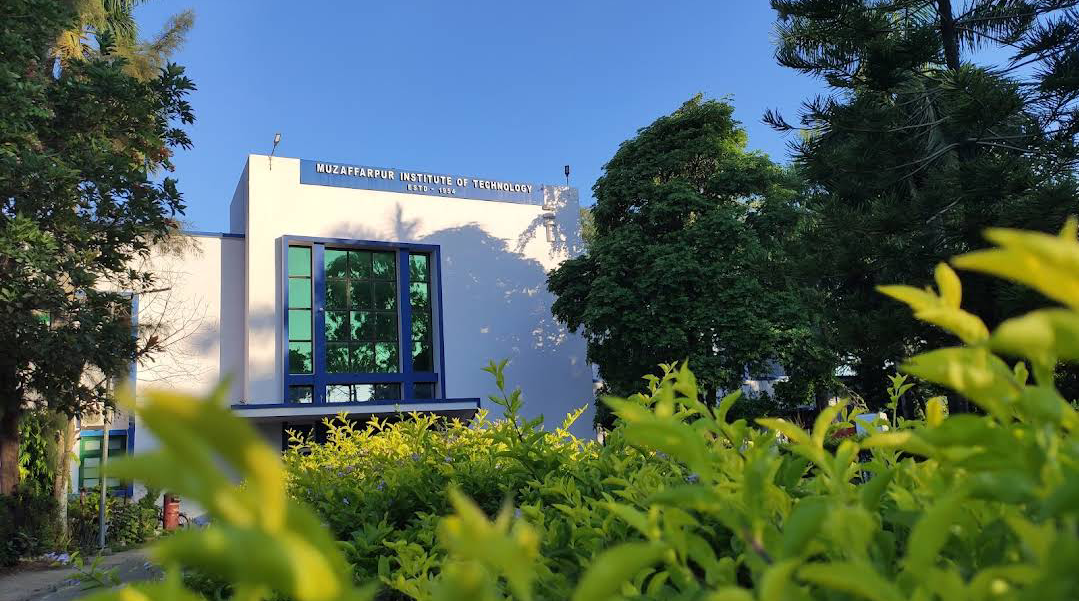
- Former names: College of Civil Engineering, Muzaffarpur (1954–1959)
- Motto: Sarvopari Karma
- Motto in English: Work is above everything else
- Type: Public
- Established: 1954 (72 years ago)
- Founder: Jawaharlal Nehru
- Affiliations: Bihar Engineering University
- Principal: Dr. M. K. Jha
- Faculty: 50
- Administrative staff: 150
- Students: 1,350
- Undergraduates: 1,300
- Location: Muzaffarpur, Bihar, India
- Campus: Urban 85 acres (340,000 m^{2})
- Nicknames: MIT, Muzaffarpur
- Website: www.mitmuzaffarpur.org

Muzaffarpur Institute of Technology (commonly referred to as MIT, Muzaffarpur) is a public, coeducational engineering college in Muzaffarpur, Bihar, India. It is administered by the Department of Science and Technology, Bihar and funded by Government of Bihar. It was founded in 1954, just after India attained independence in 1947. The foundation stone was laid by the first Prime Minister of India, Jawaharlal Nehru.

== History ==
Muzaffarpur Institute of Technology (MIT) was established on 25 September 1954, seven years after India’s independence. The institute was inaugurated by Sri C. P. N. Sinha, the then Governor of East Punjab. It initially began as the College of Civil Engineering, Muzaffarpur, offering only the Civil Engineering discipline with an inaugural batch of 45 students in the 1954–55 academic session.

On 21 April 1956, the foundation stone of the main building was laid by Pandit Jawaharlal Nehru, the first Prime Minister of India. The Electrical and Mechanical Engineering branches were introduced in the 1960–61 session, following which the institute was renamed Muzaffarpur Institute of Technology. The Pharmacy and Leather Technology disciplines were added in 1978 and 1986 respectively. Later, Information Technology and Electronics and Communication Engineering programmes were introduced in 2001.

== Academics ==
Muzaffarpur Institute of Technology offers undergraduate and postgraduate programmes in Engineering and Pharmacy.

=== Undergraduate programmes ===
The institute offers undergraduate programmes with a total sanctioned intake of 580 seats.

=== Postgraduate programmes ===
Postgraduate programmes are offered at the institute with a total sanctioned intake of 120 seats.

=== Admissions ===
From 2019 onwards, undergraduate admissions are based on the merit list of the Joint Entrance Examination – Main (JEE Main), conducted by the National Testing Agency. Earlier, admissions were conducted through the Bihar Combined Entrance Competitive Examination Board.

Admission to postgraduate programmes is based on the score obtained in the Graduate Aptitude Test in Engineering (GATE).

== Departments ==
Muzaffarpur Institute of Technology has the following academic departments:

- Biomedical and Robotics Engineering
- Civil Engineering
- Computer Science and Engineering
- Electronics and Communication Engineering
- Electrical Engineering
- Information Technology
- Leather Technology
- Mechanical Engineering
- Pharmacy
- Applied Science and Humanities

== Campus ==
The campus of Muzaffarpur Institute of Technology is located in the north-western part of Muzaffarpur city, along the Muzaffarpur–Motihari road. It covers an area of 85 acres (340,000 m^{2}) and is situated about four kilometres from Muzaffarpur Junction.

The campus is bounded by the Burhi Gandak River to the north, a reservoir to the east, the Muzaffarpur–Motihari road to the south, and an internal road network to the west.

The campus is broadly divided into the following functional zones:

- Academic Zone, which includes departmental offices, lecture theatres, laboratories, and libraries
- Student Residential Zone
- Faculty and Staff Residential Zone
- Student Recreational Zone, comprising football and cricket grounds and badminton courts

The campus also has an Auditorium and Visual Hall (AVH), which is used for cultural and academic programmes. Separate buildings are available for academic departments such as Information Technology and Electronics and Communication Engineering, along with dedicated laboratories for Physics and Chemistry.

Other facilities on the campus include a student activity centre, a primary school named *MIT Bal Niketan International School*, branches of the State Bank of India and Central Bank of India, a post office, a temple, and guest houses for parents and visitors.

=== Residential facilities ===
The institute has a well-developed residential system for students. There are seven boys’ hostels with a combined accommodation capacity of about 1,400 students and one girls’ hostel, known as the Golden Jubilee Girls’ Hostel, which can accommodate approximately 200 students. Hostel No. 1, also known as Damodar Hostel, was constructed in 1952, prior to the construction of the main academic building of the institute.

Single-seated rooms are generally allotted to final-year and pre-final-year students, while first- and second-year students are accommodated in double- and triple-seated rooms. One of the hostels, known as the Welfare Hostel, is exclusively meant for Scheduled Caste and Scheduled Tribe students and is administered by the Welfare Department.

=== Sports and student activities ===
Sports and extracurricular activities have been an integral part of campus life since 1954. The campus provides facilities for outdoor sports such as cricket, football, volleyball, and badminton, along with facilities for indoor games including table tennis and chess. The sports grounds and courts are regularly maintained.

The Sports Club became inactive around 2000 but was revived in 2017 by a group of students from the 2015 batch under the name *MIT Sports Club*. Since its revival, the club has been organising the institute’s annual sports meet, inter-college sports events, and various tournaments at the campus sports grounds. Inter-college and interstate tournaments are also held regularly.

Student activities on campus are coordinated through several clubs, including:

- The Technical Club
- Junoon-1
- The Cultural Club
- The Sports Club
- MITRA Club

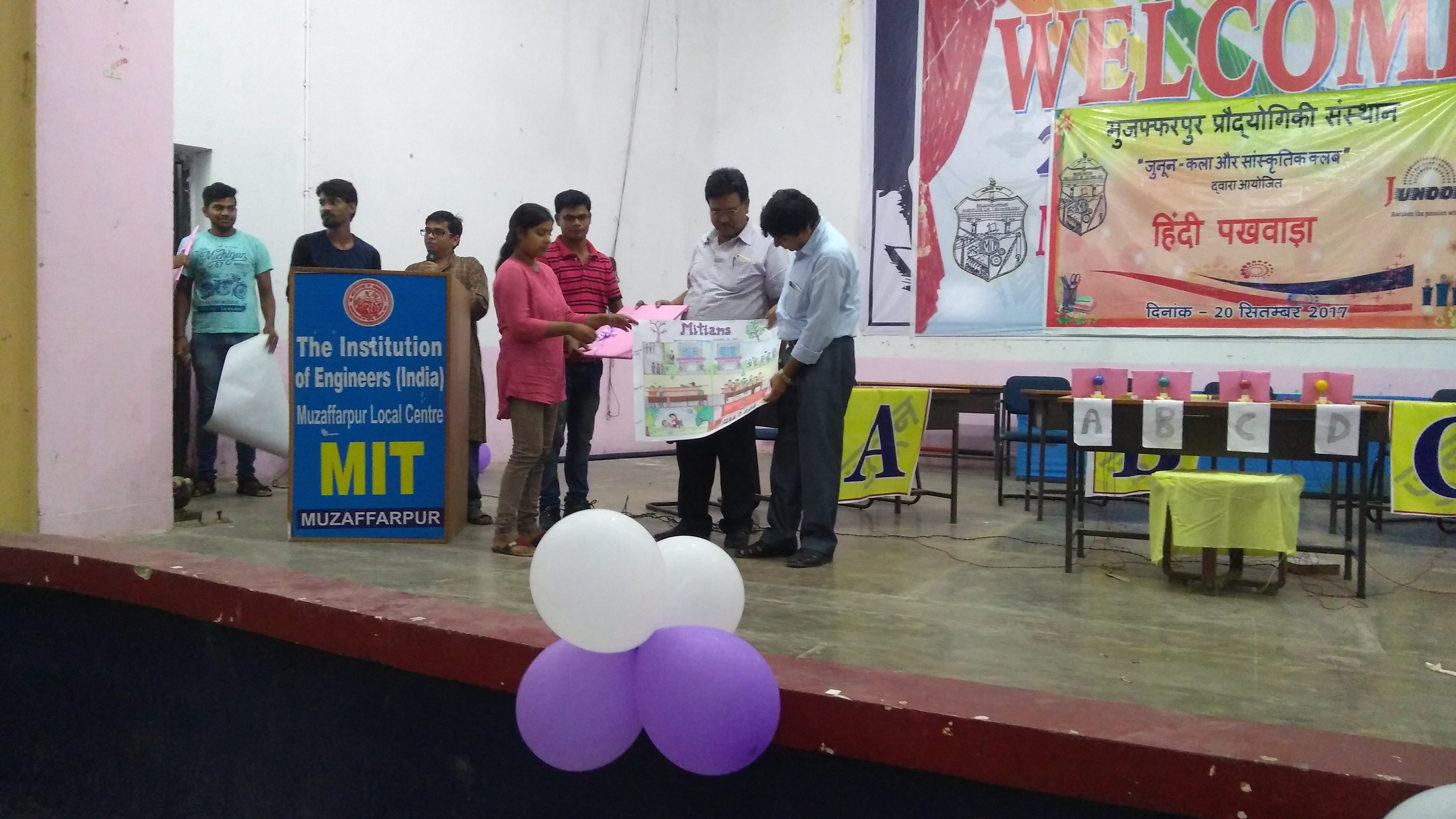
Hindi Pakhwada organised by Junoon

=== Innovation and entrepreneurship ===
The Start-up Cell at Muzaffarpur Institute of Technology was established on 16 January 2018 with the objective of promoting innovation and entrepreneurship among students by providing institutional guidance and support.

The Small Industries Research, Training and Development Organization (SIRTDO) was established at the institute in 1976 with financial support from the Government of Bihar. SIRTDO encourages entrepreneurship among students and acts as an incubation centre for new business ventures. It organises orientation and training programmes in collaboration with national-level institutions and provides training in areas such as product design and development, management, marketing, and finance.

=== IT and Internet facilities ===
The institute is connected to its Internet Service Provider through a leased optical-fibre link with a bandwidth of 100 Mbps. Internet access is available across the campus, including laboratories and hostels, through both wired and Wi-Fi networks.

The Computer Centre provides round-the-clock Wi-Fi and broadband internet services to support academic and research activities. It has been upgraded with the installation of 195 desktop computers, which are primarily used for programming instruction, practical work, and student research.
