= Lalan Kumar =

Indian politician (born 1973)

Lalan Kumar (born 1973) is an Indian politician from Bihar. He is an MLA from Pirpainti Assembly constituency which is reserved for Scheduled Caste community in Bhagalpur District. He won the 2020 Bihar Legislative Assembly election representing Bharatiya Janata Party.

== Early life and education ==
Kumar is from Pirpainti, Bhagalpur District, Bihar. He is the son of late Sivnath Paswan. He completed his B.Sc. in Engineering at MIT Muzaffarpur in 2000.

== Career ==
Kumar won from Pirpainti Assembly constituency representing Bharatiya Janata Party in the 2020 Bihar Legislative Assembly constituency. He polled 96,229 votes and defeated his nearest rival, Ram Vilas Paswan of RJD, by a margin of 27,019 votes.
