= Inspirasia Foundation =

NPO supporting health and education

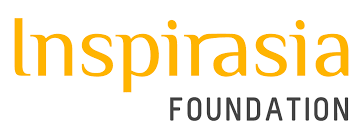

Inspirasia Foundation is a non-profit organisation that funds and supports projects in health and education for marginalised communities and persons with disabilities.

== Origin ==
In 2002, The Kuta Terrorist Bomb in Bali Indonesia claimed the life of Annika Linden along with another 202 people.The Annika Linden Foundation was set up in 2003 by her fiancée Mark Weingard in her honour. It is now known as Inspirasia Foundation. Based on the model of Venture Philanthropy and social investment, Inspirasia helps fund the voluntary sector in their efforts to address social problems.

== Work ==
The foundation funds a number of projects across Indonesia, Thailand, India and Malta working alongside small non-profit organisations helping them address issues affecting marginalised groups. Since 2003, Inspirasia has provided around $10 million to health services, disability aid, education and disaster relief support in India, Indonesia and Thailand.

=== Indonesia ===
The foundation is based in Indonesia and its main activity lies in Bali. The Annika Linden Centre, founded by the Inspirasia Foundation helps persons with disabilities to receive mobility aids, rehabilitation, education and employment opportunities under one roof. Opened in January 2013, the centre brings together Indonesian non-profit organisation leaders from entities such as YPK Bali, PUSPADI Bali, Yayasan Rama Sesana, YKIP, East Bali Poverty Project and others to help them work more effectively. Focusing on Education and Health, these organisations help children, youth and families living in poverty, people with disabilities as well as specific issues related to Women.

=== Thailand ===
The foundation's activity lies in supporting various organisations such as the Foundation for Education and Development (FED) and Home & LifePhang Nga Foundation. Since the 2004 Tsunami, FED has been instrumental in its fight for the human rights of Burmese families and their needs for primary education and health care. It also helps underprivileged children in rural Thailand. Home& Life Foundation provides a safe and supportive environment for disadvantaged children.

=== India ===
In India, the foundation supports Community Outreach Programme (CORP) India, an organisation that enables Indian women and their families living in slums to alleviate poverty The Sankalp Rehabilitation Trust is based in Mumbai and runs a rehabilitation and prevention programme for drug users on the street.

=== Malta ===
The Malta Social Impact Awards and The Academy of Givers have been founded by Inspirasia Foundation in Malta to work hand in hand with local non-profit organisations. Besides providing funding, the aim is to help educate leaders of these organisations on how to manage their projects more effectively and with purpose.
