= Naomi Mugo =

Kenyan middle-distance runner

Medal record

Women's athletics

Representing Kenya

African Championships
Gold medal – first place	1996 Yaoundé	800 m
Gold medal – first place	1996 Yaoundé	1500 m

Naomi Mugo (born 2 January 1977 in Nyahururu) is a Kenyan middle-distance runner who specializes in the 1500 metres and cross-country running.

She was the 1999 winner of the Cross Internacional de Soria competition.

== International competitions ==
Year	Competition	Venue	Position	Event	Notes
Representing Kenya
1996	World Cross Country Championships	Stellenbosch, South Africa	3rd	Long race	
1996	World Cross Country Championships	Stellenbosch, South Africa	1st	Team	
1996	African Championships	Yaoundé, Cameroon	1st	800 m	
1996	African Championships	Yaoundé, Cameroon	1st	1500 m	
1997	World Cross Country Championships	Turin, Italy	8th	Long race	
1997	World Cross Country Championships	Turin, Italy	2nd	Team	
1998	World Cross Country Championships	Marrakesh, Morocco	11th	Long race	
2001	World Cross Country Championships	Ostend, Belgium	11th	Short race	
2001	World Cross Country Championships	Ostend, Belgium	2nd	Team	
2002	Africa Military Games	Nairobi, Kenya	1st	1500 m	
2003	World Championships	Paris, France	6th	1500 m	
2003	All-Africa Games	Abuja, Nigeria	3rd	1500 m	
2003	World Athletics Final	Monte Carlo, Monaco	6th	1500 m	

== Personal bests ==
- 1500 metres – 3:58.12 min (1998)
- 3000 metres – 8:43.55 min (2000)
- 5000 metres – 15:25.13 min (2000)
