= Rose Kosgei =

Kenyan long-distance runner

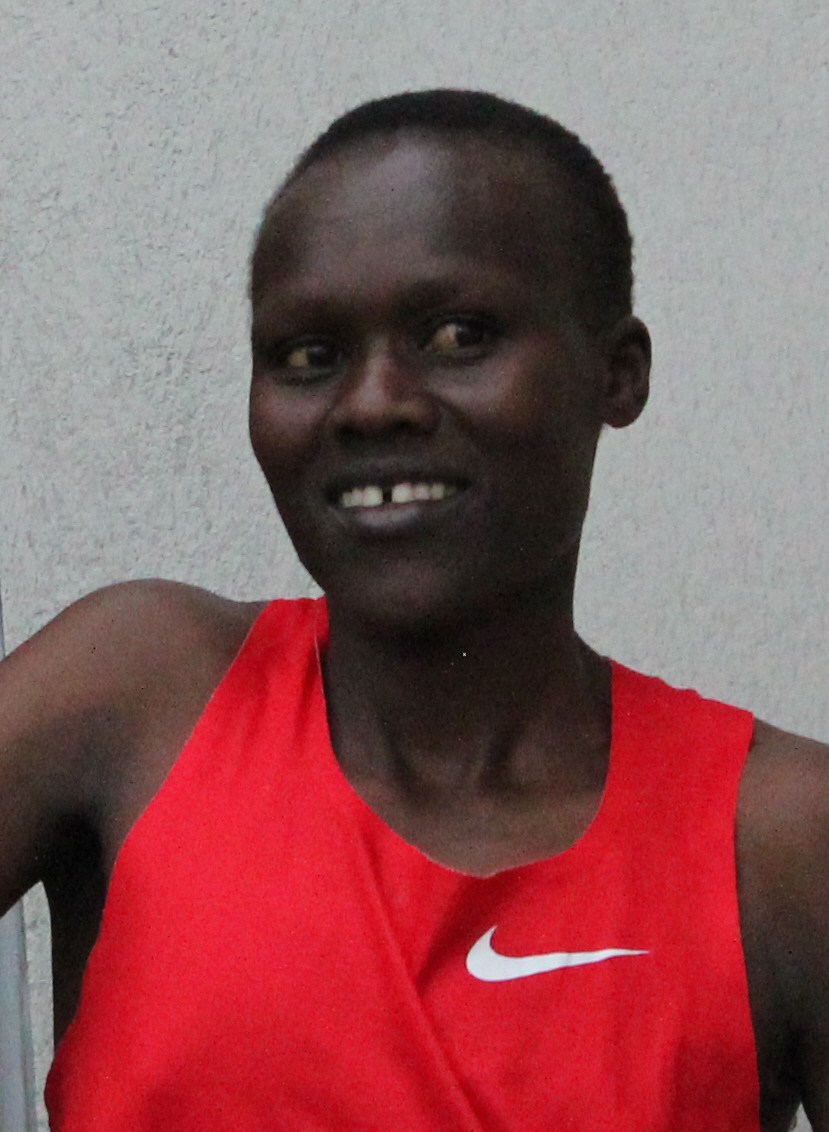
Rose Jerotich 2014 in Schortens

Rose Jerotich Kosgei (born 22 August 1981) is a Kenyan long-distance runner who competes in half marathon and marathon races.

She initially started out as a 1500 metres runner and placed fourth in the event at the World Junior Championships in Athletics in 1996 and 1998, before going on to claim the silver medal at the 2000 World Junior Championships in Athletics. She was the gold medallist in the 1500 m at the 1997 African Junior Athletics Championships. She also competed in cross country running and lifted the junior title at the 1997 IAAF World Cross Country Championships, taking the team title alongside Priscah Jepleting.

After her junior career, she initially focused on running the 5000 metres as a senior, but focused on road running competitions from 2007 onwards. In 2008, she was runner-up at the Dallas Half Marathon and the Carlsbad 5000 She ran a personal best and course record of 1:09:03 hours at the 2009 Prague Half Marathon and then placed third at the Freihofer's Run for Women. She was the winner at that year's New York Mini 10K. After a defence of her title at the Prague Half Marathon, her marathon debut came at the Toronto Waterfront Marathon in September and she came in eighth place with a time of 2:30:52 hours.

Kosgei came within a second of her personal best at the RAK Half Marathon, where she finished in fourth place. In attempt for a third straight win, she ran at the Prague Half Marathon, but failed to top the podium on this occasion, coming in third place instead. An outing at the 2011 Hamburg Marathon and although her time of 2:39:40 hours was much slower than her best, she still took sixth place overall.
