= Joelle Franzmann =

German triathlete

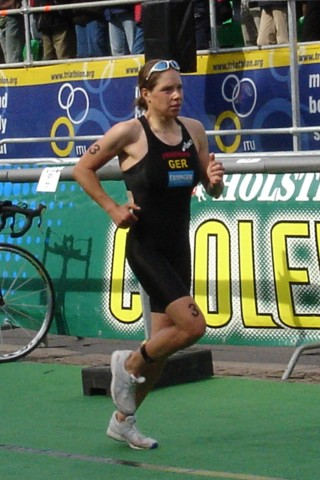
Joelle Franzmann.

Joelle Franzmann (born December 29, 1978, in Idar-Oberstein, Rhineland-Palatinate) is an athlete from Germany, who competes in triathlon.

Franzmann competed at the first Olympic triathlon at the 2000 Summer Olympics in Sydney, Australia. She took 21st place overall with a time of 02:05:24. She finished with a swimming time of 19:11, a bike time of 01:05:13, a run time of 00:40:08.

Four years later, at the 2004 Summer Olympics in Athens, Greece, Franzmann placed sixteenth overall with a time of 2:08:18.33. Her swim time was 00:18:54, her bike time 01:10:57 and her run time 00:37:25.

== Non-Olympic Triathlons ==
Date	Competition	Place	Organization	Rank	Time
2008-07-05	BG Triathlon World Cup	Hamburg, Germany	Elite Women	9th	02:00:36
2008-06-28	ITU Triathlon Premium European Cup	Holten, Netherlands	Elite Women	1st	02:04:27
2008-06-12	CISM World Military Triathlon Championship	Otepaa, Estonia	Elite Women	20	02:05:29
2008-06-05	BG Triathlon World Championships	Vancouver, Canada	Elite Women	DNF	00:00:00
2008-05-25	BG Triathlon World Cup	Madrid, Spain	Elite Women	11	02:08:52
2008-05-10	ETU Triathlon European Championships	Lisbon, Portugal	Elite Women	5	02:06:46
2007-09-15	BG Triathlon World Cup	Beijing, China	Elite Women	DNF	00:00:00
2007-08-30	BG Triathlon World Championships	Hamburg, Germany	Elite Women	8	01:55:15
2007-08-11	BG Triathlon World Cup	Tiszaujvaros, Hungary	Elite Women	21	02:03:06
