= John Gwako =

Kenyan long-distance runner

John Gwako (born 4 September 1978) is a Kenyan long-distance runner.

He won the Marseille-Cassis Classique Internationale half-marathon in 1997, setting a course record of 1:00:27.

After suffering from injuries for quite some time, he is now planning a comeback in 2014.

== Achievements ==
Year	Competition	Venue	Position	Event	Notes
Representing Kenya
1997	Lille Half Marathon	Lille, France	1st	Half marathon	1:01:10
1997	Corrida de Langueux	Langueux, France	1st	10 km	
1997	Marseille-Cassis Classique Internationale	Marseille, France	1st	Half marathon	1:00:27
1998	World Half Marathon Championships	Uster, Switzerland	11th	Half marathon	
1998	II Meia Maratona Internacional do Rio 1998	Rio de Janeiro, Brazil	1st	Half marathon	1:01:49
2000	World Half Marathon Championships	Veracruz, Mexico	6th	Half marathon	
2000	IV Meia Maratona Internacional do Rio 2000	Rio de Janeiro, Brazil	1st	Half marathon	1:01:48
2001	World Half Marathon Championships	Bristol, England	13th	Half marathon	
2004	VIII Meia Maratona Internacional do Rio 2004	Rio de Janeiro, Brazil	1st	Half marathon	1:02:11

=== Personal bests ===
- Half marathon - 1:01:00 hrs (1997)
- Marathon - 2:12:30 hrs (2005)
