= Pauline Curley (athlete) =

Irish marathon runner

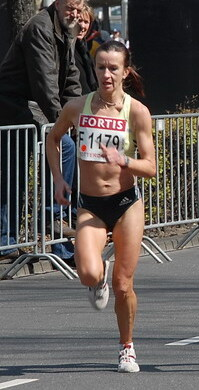
- Curley in the 2008 Rotterdam Marathon

Personal information
- Nationality: Ireland
- Born: 10 March 1969 (age 57) Killeigh, County Offaly, Ireland

Sport
- Sport: Athletics
- Event: Marathon
- Club: Tullamore Harriers (IRL)

Pauline Curley (born 10 March 1969 in Killeigh, County Offaly) is an Irish marathon runner. At age thirty-nine, she represented Ireland for the 2008 Summer Olympics in Beijing, and competed in the women's marathon. She ran and finished the race in sixty-third place, with a time of 2:47:16. She also achieved her personal best, when she placed ninth at the 2008 Rotterdam Marathon, with a time of 2:39:05. On 25 August 2013 she ran Longford Marathon, Ireland with a time of 2:44:22.

In October 2015 she was the fastest Irish woman in the Dublin marathon.
