= 1999 IAAF World Cross Country Championships – Senior women's race =

Senior women's race at the 1999 IAAF World Cross Country Championships
- Organisers: IAAF
- Edition: 27th
- Date: March 27
- Host city: Belfast, Northern Ireland, United Kingdom
- Venue: Barnett Demesne/Queen’s University Playing Fields
- Events: 1
- Distances: 8.012 km – Senior women
- Participation: 103 athletes from 27 nations

The Senior women's race at the 1999 IAAF World Cross Country Championships was held at the Barnett Demesne/Queen’s University Playing Fields in Belfast, Northern Ireland, United Kingdom, on March 27, 1999. Reports of the event were given in The New York Times, in the Glasgow Herald, and for the IAAF.

Complete results for individuals, for teams, medallists, and the results of British athletes who took part were published.

== Race results ==
=== Senior women's race (8.012 km) ===
==== Individual ====
Rank	Athlete	Country	Time
1st place, gold medalist(s)	Gete Wami	Ethiopia	28:00
2nd place, silver medalist(s)	Merima Denboba	Ethiopia	28:12
3rd place, bronze medalist(s)	Paula Radcliffe	United Kingdom	28:12
4	Ayelech Worku	Ethiopia	28:15
5	Susan Chepkemei	Kenya	28:21
6	Jane Ngotho	Kenya	28:29
7	Jane Omoro	Kenya	28:40
8	Helena Sampaio	Portugal	28:42
9	Leah Malot	Kenya	28:49
10	Deena Drossin	United States	28:53
11	Leila Aman	Ethiopia	28:55
12	Restituta Joseph	Tanzania	29:07
13	Ana Dias	Portugal	29:14
14	Constantina Diţă	Romania	29:17
15	Samukeliso Moyo	Zimbabwe	29:20
16	Agnes Kiprop	Kenya	29:23
17	Tina Connelly	Canada	29:24
18	Kerryn McCann	Australia	29:26
19	Anja Smolders	Belgium	29:28
20	Sabrina Varrone	Italy	29:29
21	Chiemi Takahashi	Japan	29:30
22	Annemari Sandell	Finland	29:31
23	Jen Rhines	United States	29:31
24	Melissa Moon	New Zealand	29:31
25	Natalie Harvey	Australia	29:32
26	Rosanna Martin	Italy	29:33
27	Kumiko Takemoto	Japan	29:37
28	Kylie Risk	Australia	29:37
29	Maria Luisa Lárraga	Spain	29:38
30	Conceição Ferreira	Portugal	29:38
31	Naoko Tanaka	Japan	29:40
32	Asha Gigi	Ethiopia	29:44
33	Luminita Gogîrlea	Romania	29:47
34	Beatriz Santíago	Spain	29:47
35	Luminița Talpoș	Romania	29:49
36	Nora Rocha	Mexico	29:50
37	María Abel	Spain	29:55
38	Rosemary Ryan	Ireland	29:58
39	Cristina Iloc	Romania	30:04
40	Susie Power	Australia	30:09
41	Ana Isabel Alonso	Spain	30:11
42	Liz Talbot	United Kingdom	30:12
43	Mónica Rosa	Portugal	30:16
44	Tara Krzywicki	United Kingdom	30:16
45	Angela Mudge	United Kingdom	30:19
46	Chantal Dällenbach	France	30:25
47	Liève Slegers	Belgium	30:26
48	Carmen Troncoso	United States	30:29
49	Teresa Recio	Spain	30:31
50	Elisabeth Mongudhi	Namibia	30:37
51	Lee-Ann McPhillips	New Zealand	30:38
52	Mandy Giblin	Australia	30:40
53	Yasuko Hashimoto	Japan	30:41
54	Cari Rampersad	Canada	30:42
55	Joan Nesbit	United States	30:44
56	Milka Mikhailova	Bulgaria	30:45
57	Donna Garcia	United States	30:47
58	María Paredes	Ecuador	30:48
59	Manuela Dominguez	Spain	30:52
60	Olimpia Pop	Romania	30:53
61	Birhan Dagne	United Kingdom	30:55
62	Message Mapfumo	Zimbabwe	30:55
63	Margarita Cabello	Mexico	30:57
64	Meseret Kotu	Ethiopia	30:58
65	Matilde Ravizza	Italy	31:00
66	Lucilla Andreucci	Italy	31:02
67	Lucy Wright	United Kingdom	31:03
68	Stefanija Statkuvienė	Belgium	31:06
69	Michelle King	Canada	31:06
70	Laura Baker	United States	31:07
71	Wilma Guerra	Ecuador	31:07
72	Teresa Duffy	Ireland	31:07
73	Rosângela Faria	Brazil	31:11
74	Clair Fearnley	Australia	31:16
75	Sarah Horan	New Zealand	31:26
76	Rita de Jesús	Brazil	31:32
77	Marie McMahon	Ireland	31:34
78	Simona Viola	Italy	31:42
79	Maria Rodrigues	Brazil	31:55
80	Nili Avramski	Israel	32:02
81	Selma dos Reis	Brazil	32:10
82	Courtney Babcock	Canada	32:11
83	Maureen Harrington	Ireland	32:13
84	Dione D'Agostini	Brazil	32:20
85	Irina Matrosova	Uzbekistan	32:21
86	Tarath Tsatsa	Zimbabwe	32:33
87	Louise Cavanagh	Ireland	32:37
88	Mundan Anickal Molly	India	32:40
89	Singasi Dube	Zimbabwe	32:49
90	Barbara Brych	Canada	32:53
91	Natallia Kvachuk	Belarus	33:02
92	Gabriela Cevallos	Ecuador	33:09
93	Rina Das	India	33:12
94	Alena Skabelskaya	Belarus	33:34
95	Tatyana Tratsyuk	Belarus	33:45
96	Monica Amboya	Ecuador	33:45
97	Helena Crossan	Ireland	34:05
98	Pushpa Devi	India	34:06
99	Irina Kunakhavets	Belarus	34:57
100	Aruna Devi Waishram	India	37:31
—	Marina Bastos	Portugal	DNF
—	Stela Olteanu	Romania	DNF
—	Teresa Nunes	Portugal	DNF

==== Teams ====
Rank	Team	Points
1st place, gold medalist(s)	Ethiopia: Gete Wami / 1; Merima Denboba / 2; Ayelech Worku / 4; Leila Aman / 11; (Asha Gigi) / (32); (Meseret Kotu) / (64)	18
2nd place, silver medalist(s)	Kenya: Susan Chepkemei / 5; Jane Ngotho / 6; Jane Omoro / 7; Leah Malot / 9; (Agnes Kiprop) / (16)	27
3rd place, bronze medalist(s)	Portugal: Helena Sampaio / 8; Ana Dias / 13; Conceição Ferreira / 30; Mónica Rosa / 43; (Marina Bastos) / (DNF); (Teresa Nunes) / (DNF)	94
4	Australia: Kerryn McCann / 18; Natalie Harvey / 25; Kylie Risk / 28; Susie Power / 40; (Mandy Giblin) / (52); (Clair Fearnley) / (74)	111
5	Romania: Constantina Diţă / 14; Luminita Gogîrlea / 33; Luminița Talpoș / 35; Cristina Iloc / 39; (Olimpia Pop) / (60); (Stela Olteanu) / (DNF)	121
6	Japan: Chiemi Takahashi / 21; Kumiko Takemoto / 27; Naoko Tanaka / 31; Yasuko Hashimoto / 53	132
7	United Kingdom: Paula Radcliffe / 3; Liz Talbot / 42; Tara Krzywicki / 44; Angela Mudge / 45; (Birhan Dagne) / (61); (Lucy Wright) / (67)	134
8	United States: Deena Drossin / 10; Jen Rhines / 23; Carmen Troncoso / 48; Joan Nesbit / 55; (Donna Garcia) / (57); (Laura Baker) / (70)	136
9	Spain: Maria Luisa Lárraga / 29; Beatriz Santíago / 34; María Abel / 37; Ana Isabel Alonso / 41; (Teresa Recio) / (49); (Manuela Dominguez) / (59)	141
10	Italy: Sabrina Varrone / 20; Rosanna Martin / 26; Mathilde Ravizza / 65; Lucilla Andreucci / 66; (Simona Viola) / (78)	177
11	Canada: Tina Connelly / 17; Cari Rampersad / 54; Michelle King / 69; Courtney Babcock / 82; (Barbara Brych) / (90)	222
12	Zimbabwe: Samukeliso Moyo / 15; Message Mapfumo / 62; Tarath Tsatsa / 86; Singasi Dube / 89	252
13	Ireland: Rosemary Ryan / 38; Teresa Duffy / 72; Marie McMahon / 77; Maureen Harrington / 83; (Louise Cavanagh) / (87); (Helena Crossan) / (97)	270
14	Brazil: Rosângela Faria / 73; Rita de Jesús / 76; Maria Rodrigues / 79; Selma dos Reis / 81; (Dione D'Agostini) / (84)	309
15	Ecuador: María Paredes / 58; Wilma Guerra / 71; Gabriela Cevallos / 92; Monica Amboya / 96	317
16	Belarus: Natallia Kvachuk / 91; Alena Skabelskaya / 94; Tatyana Tratsyuk / 95; Irina Kunakhavets / 99	379
17	India: Mundan Anickal Molly / 88; Rina Das / 93; Pushpa Devi / 98; Aruna Devi Waishram / 100	379

- Note: Athletes in parentheses did not score for the team result

== Participation ==
An unofficial count yields the participation of 103 athletes from 27 countries in the Senior women's race. This is in agreement with the official numbers as published.

- Australia (6)
- Belarus (4)
- Belgium (3)
- Brazil (5)
- Bulgaria (1)
- Canada (5)
- Ecuador (4)
- Ethiopia (6)
- Finland (1)
- France (1)
- India (4)
- Ireland (6)
- Israel (1)
- Italy (5)
- Japan (4)
- Kenya (5)
- Mexico (2)
- Namibia (1)
- New Zealand (3)
- Portugal (6)
- Romania (6)
- Spain (6)
- Tanzania (1)
- United Kingdom (6)
- United States (6)
- Uzbekistan (1)
- Zimbabwe (4)

== See also ==
- 1999 IAAF World Cross Country Championships – Senior men's race
- 1999 IAAF World Cross Country Championships – Men's short race
- 1999 IAAF World Cross Country Championships – Junior men's race
- 1999 IAAF World Cross Country Championships – Women's short race
- 1999 IAAF World Cross Country Championships – Junior women's race
