= 1999 IAAF World Cross Country Championships – Senior men's race =

Senior men's race at the 1999 IAAF World Cross Country Championships
- Organisers: IAAF
- Edition: 27th
- Date: March 28
- Host city: Belfast, Northern Ireland, United Kingdom
- Venue: Barnett Demesne/Queen’s University Playing Fields
- Events: 1
- Distances: 12 km – Senior men
- Participation: 165 athletes from 46 nations

The Senior men's race at the 1999 IAAF World Cross Country Championships was held at the Barnett Demesne/Queen’s University Playing Fields in Belfast, Northern Ireland, United Kingdom, on March 28, 1999. Reports of the event were given in The New York Times, in the Glasgow Herald, and for the IAAF.

Complete results for individuals, for teams, medallists, and the results of British athletes who took part were published.

== Race results ==
=== Senior men's race (12 km) ===
==== Individual ====
Rank	Athlete	Country	Time
1st place, gold medalist(s)	Paul Tergat	Kenya	38:28
2nd place, silver medalist(s)	Patrick Ivuti	Kenya	38:32
3rd place, bronze medalist(s)	Paulo Guerra	Portugal	38:46
4	Joshua Chelanga	Kenya	39:05
5	Evans Rutto	Kenya	39:12
6	Paul Koech	Kenya	39:51
7	Mohammed Mourhit	Belgium	40:09
8	Jon Brown	United Kingdom	40:09
9	Habte Jifar	Ethiopia	40:21
10	Domingos Castro	Portugal	40:25
11	Assefa Mezegebu	Ethiopia	40:33
12	Róbert Štefko	Slovakia	40:39
13	Lahcen Benyoussef	Morocco	40:42
14	Eduardo Henriques	Portugal	40:46
15	Saïd El Wardi	Morocco	40:53
16	Carsten Jørgensen	Denmark	40:57
17	Girma Tolla	Ethiopia	40:59
18	Kamel Kohil	Algeria	41:04
19	Giuliano Battocletti	Italy	41:05
20	Tesfaye Tola	Ethiopia	41:06
21	Alan Culpepper	United States	41:10
22	Gary Stolz	United States	41:12
23	Javier Cortés	Spain	41:14
24	Enrique Molina	Spain	41:17
25	Daniele Caimmi	Italy	41:20
26	Ayele Mezegebu	Ethiopia	41:24
27	José Carlos Adán	Spain	41:25
28	Koen van Rie	Belgium	41:29
29	José Manuel García	Spain	41:33
30	Fabián Roncero	Spain	41:37
31	Umberto Pusterla	Italy	41:39
32	Mauricio Díaz	Chile	41:41
33	Nicolae Negru	Romania	41:41
34	Keith Cullen	United Kingdom	41:42
35	Kamiel Maase	Netherlands	41:43
36	Tony Cosey	United States	41:47
37	Tegenu Abebe	Ethiopia	41:51
38	Saïd Berrioui	Morocco	42:02
39	Tom Nyariki	Kenya	42:04
40	Faustin Saktay	Tanzania	42:05
41	Lee Troop	Australia	42:06
42	Smail Sghir	Morocco	42:07
43	Mohamed Driouche	Algeria	42:08
44	John Ferrin	Ireland	42:12
45	Salaho Ngadi	Tanzania	42:13
46	Yahia Azaidj	Algeria	42:16
47	Abel Chimukoko	Zimbabwe	42:17
48	David Galindo	Mexico	42:21
49	Alberto Maravilha	Portugal	42:23
50	Sebastiano Mazzara	Italy	42:26
51	Richard Potts	New Zealand	42:29
52	Glynn Tromans	United Kingdom	42:30
53	Francis Robert Naali	Tanzania	42:30
54	Clint Wells	United States	42:33
55	Marc Vanderstraeten	Belgium	42:37
56	Dermot Donnelly	Ireland	42:38
57	Abner Chipu	South Africa	42:38
58	William Vasquez	Colombia	42:39
59	Roman Kejzar	Slovenia	42:41
60	Jeff Schiebler	Canada	42:42
61	Marcel Versteeg	Netherlands	42:42
62	Dean Cavuoto	Australia	42:44
63	Patrick Kaotsane	South Africa	42:47
64	Hendrick Ramaala	South Africa	42:48
65	Andrew Pearson	United Kingdom	42:48
66	Mehdi Khelifi	Tunisia	42:53
67	Pablo Olmedo	Mexico	42:54
68	Alberto Chaíça	Portugal	42:54
69	Michael Ngaaseke	Zimbabwe	43:00
70	Christopher Graff	United States	43:00
71	João Junqueira	Portugal	43:03
72	Luis Alberto Ochoa	Colombia	43:05
73	Christian Stephenson	United Kingdom	43:05
74	Jacinto Navarrete	Colombia	43:06
75	Abdelilah El Manaia	Morocco	43:13
76	Martin McCarthy	Ireland	43:14
77	David Burke	Ireland	43:15
78	Tetsuhiro Furuta	Japan	43:19
79	Jeremy Deere	Canada	43:19
80	Samir Moussaoui	Algeria	43:20
81	Tarek Zoghmar	Algeria	43:21
82	Darren Lynch	Australia	43:22
83	Zarislav Gapeyenko	Belarus	43:23
84	Marilson dos Santos	Brazil	43:28
85	Brett Cartwright	Australia	43:31
86	Sander Schutgens	Netherlands	43:35
87	Yoji Yamaguchi	Japan	43:37
88	Ovidiu Tat	Romania	43:38
89	Raymond Appenheimer	United States	43:41
90	Paddy McCluskey	Canada	43:43
91	Azzedine Sakhri	Algeria	43:48
92	Dominic Bannister	United Kingdom	43:48
93	Ayele Setegne	Israel	43:51
94	Martin Dent	Australia	43:57
95	Pauric McKinney	Ireland	44:06
96	Vincent Kuotane	South Africa	44:09
97	Jussi Utriainen	Finland	44:10
98	José de Souza	Brazil	44:10
99	Noel Cullen	Ireland	44:10
100	Wellington Fraga	Brazil	44:11
101	Chris Weber	Canada	44:14
102	Dmitry Dubovskiy	Belarus	44:19
103	Naoki Mishiro	Japan	44:23
104	George Majaji	Zimbabwe	44:35
105	Arthur Osman	Poland	44:38
106	Craig Kirkwood	New Zealand	44:46
107	Sergio Couto	Brazil	44:53
108	Vladimir Sivalobov	Belarus	45:06
109	Juan Alejandro Perea	Colombia	45:13
110	Tsungai Mwanengeni	Zimbabwe	45:15
111	Takhir Mamashayev	Kazakhstan	45:20
112	Toomas Tarm	Estonia	45:21
113	Sergey Zabavskiy	Tajikistan	45:25
114	Maxwell Bangani	Zimbabwe	45:30
115	Josep Sansa	Andorra	45:37
116	Kudakwashe Shoko	Zimbabwe	45:43
117	Leonid Pykhteyev	Kyrgyzstan	45:46
118	Chris McGregor	Canada	45:47
119	Daisuke Arakawa	Japan	45:53
120	David Lorne	Canada	46:19
121	Rustam Radjapov	Turkmenistan	46:24
122	Menon Ramsamy	Mauritius	46:36
123	Gulab Chand	India	46:47
124	Alagawadi Shivananda	India	46:47
125	Uladzimir Dukhnovich	Belarus	46:51
126	Sentso Retere	Lesotho	46:57
127	Bhairav Singh	India	46:58
128	Charygeldiy Allaberdiyev	Turkmenistan	47:17
129	Khauta Ntsoele	Lesotho	47:21
130	Khasan Rakhimov	Uzbekistan	47:29
131	Nick Harrison	Australia	47:30
132	Tau Khotso	Lesotho	47:39
133	Nazirdin Akylbekov	Kyrgyzstan	47:44
134	José Amado García	Guatemala	47:52
135	Tebatso Motsotsoana	Lesotho	48:07
136	Albert Shamsiyev	Uzbekistan	48:13
137	Parakhat Kurtgeldiyev	Turkmenistan	48:26
138	Mpakeletsa Sephali	Lesotho	48:27
139	Anil Kumar	India	48:32
140	Kevin Musseliah	Mauritius	48:42
141	António Zeferino	Cape Verde	48:44
142	Walid Ibrahim	Palestine	48:44
143	Rinat Ablyayev	Uzbekistan	48:48
144	Amrlon Hernandez	Guatemala	49:21
145	Chokirjon Irmatov	Tajikistan	49:31
146	Victor Velásquez	Guatemala	49:37
147	Ivan Kibiryov	Uzbekistan	49:43
148	Artyom Tetenkin	Kyrgyzstan	50:06
149	Ihab Salama	Palestine	50:08
150	Moses Zarak Khan	Fiji	50:31
151	Jean Paul Louise	Mauritius	50:41
152	Evilio Mijangos	Guatemala	50:59
153	Isireli Naikelekelevesi	Fiji	51:11
154	Eric Vamben	Mauritius	51:25
155	Bimiesh Kumar	Fiji	51:55
156	Mohamed Salama	Palestine	52:25
157	Esala Talebula	Fiji	52:37
158	Parasram Ramah	Mauritius	53:34
—	Salah Hissou	Morocco	DNF
—	Rachid Berradi	Italy	DNF
—	Andrea Arlati	Italy	DNF
—	Abhinesh Kumar Chand	Fiji	DNF
—	Ergobert Robert Naali	Tanzania	DNF
—	Niteshwar Prasad	Fiji	DNF
—	Julio Rey^{†}	Spain	DQ
—	Antonio Fabián Silio	Argentina	DNS

^{†}: Julio Rey of Spain finished 24th in 41:15 min, but was disqualified.

==== Teams ====
Rank	Team	Points
1st place, gold medalist(s)	Kenya: Paul Tergat / 1; Patrick Ivuti / 2; Joshua Chelanga / 4; Evans Rutto / 5; (Paul Koech) / (6); (Tom Nyariki) / (39)	12
2nd place, silver medalist(s)	Ethiopia: Habte Jifar / 9; Assefa Mezegebu / 11; Girma Tolla / 17; Tesfaye Tola / 20; (Ayele Mezegebu) / (26); (Tegenu Abebe) / (37)	57
3rd place, bronze medalist(s)	Portugal: Paulo Guerra / 3; Domingos Castro / 10; Eduardo Henriques / 14; Alberto Maravilha / 49; (Alberto Chaíça) / (68); (João Junqueira) / (71)	76
4	Spain: Javier Cortés / 23; Enrique Molina / 24; José Carlos Adán / 27; José Manuel García / 29; (Fabián Roncero) / (30)	103
5	Morocco: Lahcen Benyoussef / 13; Saïd El Wardi / 15; Saïd Berrioui / 38; Smail Sghir / 42; (Abdelilah El Manaia) / (75); (Salah Hissou) / (DNF)	108
6	Italy: Giuliano Battocletti / 19; Daniele Caimmi / 25; Umberto Pusterla / 31; Sebastiano Mazzara / 50; (Rachid Berradi) / (DNF); (Andrea Arlati) / (DNF)	125
7	United States: Alan Culpepper / 21; Gary Stolz / 22; Tony Cosey / 36; Clint Wells / 54; (Christopher Graff) / (70); (Raymond Appenheimer) / (89)	133
8	United Kingdom: Jon Brown / 8; Keith Cullen / 34; Glynn Tromans / 52; Andrew Pearson / 65; (Christian Stephenson) / (73); (Dominic Bannister) / (92)	159
9	Algeria: Kamel Kohil / 18; Mohamed Driouche / 43; Yahia Azaidj / 46; Samir Moussaoui / 80; (Tarek Zoghmar) / (81); (Azzedine Sakhri) / (91)	187
10	Ireland: John Ferrin / 44; Dermot Donnelly / 56; Martin McCarthy / 76; David Burke / 77; (Pauric McKinney) / (95); (Noel Cullen) / (99)	253
11	Australia: Lee Troop / 41; Dean Cavuoto / 62; Darren Lynch / 82; Brett Cartwright / 85; (Martin Dent) / (94); (Nick Harrison) / (131)	270
12	South Africa: Abner Chipu / 57; Patrick Kaotsane / 63; Hendrick Ramaala / 64; Vincent Kuotane / 96	280
13	Colombia: William Vasquez / 58; Luis Alberto Ochoa / 72; Jacinto Navarrete / 74; Juan Alejandro Perea / 109	313
14	Canada: Jeff Schiebler / 60; Jeremy Deere / 79; Paddy McCluskey / 90; Chris Weber / 101; (Chris McGregor) / (118); (David Lorne) / (120)	330
15	Zimbabwe: Abel Chimukoko / 47; Michael Ngaaseke / 69; George Majaji / 104; Tsungai Mwanengeni / 110; (Maxwell Bangani) / (114); (Kudakwashe Shoko) / (116)	330
16	Japan: Tetsuhiro Furuta / 78; Yoji Yamaguchi / 87; Naoki Mishiro / 103; Daisuke Arakawa / 119	387
17	Brazil: Marilson dos Santos / 84; José de Souza / 98; Wellington Fraga / 100; Sergio Couto / 107	389
18	Belarus: Zarislav Gapeyenko / 83; Dmitry Dubovskiy / 102; Vladimir Sivalobov / 108; Uladzimir Dukhnovich / 125	418
19	India: Gulab Chand / 123; Alagawadi Shivananda / 124; Bhairav Singh / 127; Anil Kumar / 139	513
20	Lesotho: Sentso Retere / 126; Khauta Ntsoele / 129; Tau Khotso / 132; Tebatso Motsotsoana / 135; (Mpakeletsa Sephali) / (138)	522
21	Uzbekistan: Khasan Rakhimov / 130; Albert Shamsiyev / 136; Rinat Ablyayev / 143; Ivan Kibiryov / 147	556
22	Mauritius: Menon Ramsamy / 122; Kevin Musseliah / 140; Jean Paul Louise / 151; Eric Vamben / 154; (Parasram Ramah) / (158)	567
23	Guatemala: José Amado García / 134; Amrlon Hernandez / 144; Victor Velásquez / 146; Evilio Mijangos / 152	576
24	Fiji: Moses Zarak Khan / 150; Isireli Naikelekelevesi / 153; Bimiesh Kumar / 155; Esala Talebula / 157; (Abhinesh Kumar Chand) / (DNF); (Niteshwar Prasad) / (DNF)	615
DNF	Tanzania: (Faustin Saktay) / (40); (Salaho Ngadi) / (45); (Francis Robert Naali) / (53); (Ergobert Robert Naali) / (DNF)	DNF

- Note: Athletes in parentheses did not score for the team result

== Participation ==
An unofficial count yields the participation of 165 athletes from 46 countries in the Senior men's race. This is in agreement with the official numbers as published. The announced athlete from Argentina did not show.

- Algeria (6)
- Andorra (1)
- Australia (6)
- Belarus (4)
- Belgium (3)
- Brazil (4)
- Canada (6)
- Cape Verde (1)
- Chile (1)
- Colombia (4)
- Denmark (1)
- Estonia (1)
- Ethiopia (6)
- Fiji (6)
- Finland (1)
- Guatemala (4)
- India (4)
- Ireland (6)
- Israel (1)
- Italy (6)
- Japan (4)
- Kazakhstan (1)
- Kenya (6)
- Kyrgyzstan (3)
- Lesotho (5)
- Mauritius (5)
- Mexico (2)
- Morocco (6)
- Netherlands (3)
- New Zealand (2)
- Palestine (3)
- Poland (1)
- Portugal (6)
- Romania (2)
- Slovakia (1)
- Slovenia (1)
- South Africa (4)
- Spain (6)
- Tajikistan (2)
- Tanzania (4)
- Tunisia (1)
- Turkmenistan (3)
- United Kingdom (6)
- United States (6)
- Uzbekistan (4)
- Zimbabwe (6)

== See also ==
- 1999 IAAF World Cross Country Championships – Men's short race
- 1999 IAAF World Cross Country Championships – Junior men's race
- 1999 IAAF World Cross Country Championships – Senior women's race
- 1999 IAAF World Cross Country Championships – Women's short race
- 1999 IAAF World Cross Country Championships – Junior women's race
