= 1999 World Championships in Athletics – Women's 10,000 metres =

The women's 10,000 metres event featured at the 1999 World Championships in Seville, Spain. The final was held on 26 August 1999.

== Final ranking ==
RANK	ATHLETE	TIME
	Gete Wami (ETH)	30:24.56 (CR)
	Paula Radcliffe (GBR)	30:27.13
	Tegla Loroupe (KEN)	30:32.03
4.	Harumi Hiroyama (JPN)	31:26.84
5.	Chiemi Takahashi (JPN)	31:27.62
6.	Merima Hashim (ETH)	31:32.06
7.	Berhane Adere (ETH)	31:32.51
8.	Teresa Recio (ESP)	31:43.80
9.	Marleen Renders (BEL)	31:51.21
10.	Olivera Jevtic (YUG)	31:57.67
11.	Deena Drossin (USA)	32:11.14
12.	Yuko Kawakami (JPN)	32:19.02
13.	Restituta Joseph (TAN)	32:20.26
14.	María Abel (ESP)	32:22.88
15.	Ana Dias (POR)	32:37.72
16.	Anne Marie Letko-Lauck (USA)	32:57.07
17.	Zheng Guixia (CHN)	32:59.83
18.	Blandine Bitzner-Ducret (FRA)	33:06.98
19.	Dong Zhaoxia (CHN)	33:12.94
20.	Lidiya Vasilevskaya (RUS)	33:13.21
21.	María Luisa Larraga (ESP)	33:15.98
22.	Zahia Dahmani (FRA)	33:46.23
23.	Priscilla Mamba (SWZ)	38:45.18
	Fernanda Ribeiro (POR)	DNF
	Asmae Laghzaoui (MAR)	DNF
	Leah Malot (KEN)	DNF
	Alice Timbilil (KEN)	DNF
	Annemari Sandell (FIN)	DNF
	Helena Sampaio (POR)	DNF
	Libbie Johnson-Hickman (USA)	DNF
	Stella Castro (COL)	DNS
