= 1999 IAAF World Cross Country Championships – Women's short race =

Women's short race at the 1999 IAAF World Cross Country Championships
- Organisers: IAAF
- Edition: 27th
- Date: March 28
- Host city: Belfast, Northern Ireland, United Kingdom
- Venue: Barnett Demesne/Queen’s University Playing Fields
- Events: 6
- Distances: 4.236 km – Women's short
- Participation: 109 athletes from 29 nations

The Women's short race at the 1999 IAAF World Cross Country Championships was held at the Barnett Demesne/Queen’s University Playing Fields in Belfast, Northern Ireland, United Kingdom, on March 28, 1999. Reports of the event were given in The New York Times, in the Glasgow Herald, and for the IAAF.

Complete results for individuals, for teams, medallists, and the results of British athletes who took part were published.

== Race results ==
=== Women's short race (4.236 km) ===
==== Individual ====
Rank	Athlete	Country	Time
1st place, gold medalist(s)	Jackline Maranga	Kenya	15:09
2nd place, silver medalist(s)	Yamna Belkacem	France	15:16
3rd place, bronze medalist(s)	Annemari Sandell	Finland	15:17
4	Kathy Butler	Canada	15:30
5	Restituta Joseph	Tanzania	15:31
6	Alemitu Bekele	Ethiopia	15:37
7	Asmae Leghzaoui	Morocco	15:40
8	Teresa Wanjiku	Kenya	15:41
9	Fatima Yvelain	France	15:44
10	Blandine Bitzner-Ducret	France	15:47
11	Constantina Diţă	Romania	15:49
12	Kutre Dulecha	Ethiopia	15:50
13	Seloua Ouaziz	Morocco	15:53
14	Lulit Legesse	Ethiopia	15:56
15	Amy Waterlow	United Kingdom	15:56
16	Genet Gebregiorgis	Ethiopia	15:57
17	Yimenashu Taye	Ethiopia	15:58
18	Elva Dryer	United States	15:58
19	Celine Rajot	France	15:58
20	Samukeliso Moyo	Zimbabwe	15:59
21	Jeruto Kiptum	Kenya	16:01
22	Anne Keenan-Buckley	Ireland	16:02
23	Luminita Gogîrlea	Romania	16:05
24	Zhor El Kamch	Morocco	16:07
25	Saliha Khaldoun	Morocco	16:08
26	Justyna Bąk	Poland	16:08
27	Michaela Möller	Germany	16:09
28	Breda Dennehy	Ireland	16:09
29	Cristina Iloc	Romania	16:11
30	Olimpia Pop	Romania	16:13
31	Angela Newport	United Kingdom	16:16
32	Galina Bogomolova	Russia	16:19
33	Getenesh Urge	Ethiopia	16:19
34	Anita Weyermann	Switzerland	16:23
35	Amaia Piedra	Spain	16:24
36	Elisabeth Mongudhi	Namibia	16:25
37	Tatyana Tomashova	Russia	16:26
38	Bouchra Benthami	Morocco	16:28
39	Helen Pattinson	United Kingdom	16:29
40	Hayley Parry	United Kingdom	16:30
41	Jacqueline Martín	Spain	16:33
42	Elizabeth Chemweno	Kenya	16:34
43	Maria Rodrigues	Brazil	16:36
44	Yolandi Buitendag	South Africa	16:37
45	Andrea Whitcombe	United Kingdom	16:37
46	Rodica Nagel	France	16:38
47	Heather DeGeest	Canada	16:39
48	Amy Rudolph	United States	16:39
49	Catherine Palacios	United States	16:42
50	Cristina Petite	Spain	16:42
51	Truzanne Swanepoel	South Africa	16:43
52	Sarah Howell	Canada	16:43
53	Yelena Motalova	Russia	16:43
54	Una English	Ireland	16:44
55	Niamh Beirne	Ireland	16:45
56	Denisa Costescu	Romania	16:46
57	Sunita Rani	India	16:46
58	Rosângela Faria	Brazil	16:46
59	Klara Kashapova	Russia	16:48
60	Tausi Saidi	Tanzania	16:48
61	Amanda Crowe	United Kingdom	16:51
62	Karen Harvey	Canada	16:51
63	Rita de Jesús	Brazil	16:53
64	Charné Rademeyer	South Africa	16:54
65	Rebecca Spies	United States	17:00
66	Elaine Fitzgerald	Ireland	17:04
67	Zena Wilsnach	South Africa	17:06
68	Sara Valderas	Spain	17:07
69	Joalsiae Llado	France	17:07
70	Natalia Azpiazu	Spain	17:09
71	Sarah Dupré	Canada	17:10
72	Anzhelika Averkova	Ukraine	17:12
73	Message Mapfumo	Zimbabwe	17:12
74	Molly Watcke	United States	17:16
75	Svetlana Baygulova	Russia	17:20
76	Mairead Murphy	Ireland	17:24
77	Ryoko Yamane	Japan	17:28
78	Shayne Culpepper	United States	17:32
79	Krestena Sullivan	Canada	17:32
80	Olena Gorodnychova	Ukraine	17:33
81	Tatyana Glazyr	Ukraine	17:34
82	Niusha Mansilla	Bolivia	17:37
83	Luminița Talpoș	Romania	17:39
84	Tatyana Buloichyk	Belarus	17:39
85	Natalya Kravets	Belarus	17:45
86	Rocío Rodriguez	Spain	17:48
87	Clara Morales	Chile	17:49
88	Susana Rebolledo	Chile	17:54
89	Mukti Roy	India	17:54
90	Tarath Tsatsa	Zimbabwe	17:56
91	Marina Nascimento	Brazil	18:07
92	Nataliya Romanchuk	Ukraine	18:10
93	Siphuluwazi Sibindi	Zimbabwe	18:12
94	Lucy Siwela	Zimbabwe	18:13
95	Singasi Dube	Zimbabwe	18:21
96	Olga Moroz	Belarus	18:22
97	Kunnam Parakkal Suma	India	18:26
98	Anahi Soto	Chile	18:33
99	Ana de Souza	Brazil	18:58
100	Yelena Bychkovskaya	Belarus	19:02
101	Flor Venegas	Chile	19:03
102	Madhuri Gurnule	India	19:17
103	Rezeda Yusupova	Uzbekistan	19:18
104	Alena Petrova	Turkmenistan	19:58
105	Antoinette Edouard	Mauritius	20:17
106	Svetlana Kasymskya	Turkmenistan	23:07
107	Violet Dudeleva	Turkmenistan	26:51
—	Naomi Mugo	Kenya	DNF
—	Dione D'Agostini	Brazil	DNF
—	Mandy Giblin	Australia	DNS
—	Natalie Harvey	Australia	DNS
—	Kerryn McCann	Australia	DNS
—	Kylie Risk	Australia	DNS
—	Susie Power	Australia	DNS
—	Clair Fearnley	Australia	DNS
—	Zahra Ouaziz	Morocco	DNS

==== Teams ====
Rank	Team	Points
1st place, gold medalist(s)	France: Yamna Belkacem / 2; Fatima Yvelain / 9; Blandine Bitzner-Ducret / 10; Celine Rajot / 19; (Rodica Nagel) / (46); (Joalsiae Llado) / (69)	40
2nd place, silver medalist(s)	Ethiopia: Alemitu Bekele / 6; Kutre Dulecha / 12; Lulit Legesse / 14; Genet Gebregiorgis / 16; (Yimenashu Taye) / (17); (Getenesh Urge) / (33)	48
3rd place, bronze medalist(s)	Morocco: Asmae Leghzaoui / 7; Seloua Ouaziz / 13; Zhor El Kamch / 24; Saliha Khaldoun / 25; (Bouchra Benthami) / (38)	69
4	Kenya: Jackline Maranga / 1; Teresa Wanjiku / 8; Jeruto Kiptum / 21; Elizabeth Chemweno / 42; (Naomi Mugo) / (DNF)	72
5	Romania: Constantina Diţă / 11; Luminita Gogîrlea / 23; Cristina Iloc / 29; Olimpia Pop / 30; (Denisa Costescu) / (56); (Luminița Talpoș) / (83)	93
6	United Kingdom: Amy Waterlow / 15; Angela Newport / 31; Helen Pattinson / 39; Hayley Parry / 40; (Andrea Whitcombe) / (45); (Amanda Crowe) / (61)	125
7	Ireland: Anne Keenan-Buckley / 22; Breda Dennehy / 28; Una English / 54; Niamh Beirne / 55; (Elaine Fitzgerald) / (66); (Mairead Murphy) / (76)	159
8	Canada: Kathy Butler / 4; Heather DeGeest / 47; Sarah Howell / 52; Karen Harvey / 62; (Sarah Dupré) / (71); (Krestena Sullivan) / (79)	165
9	United States: Elva Dryer / 18; Amy Rudolph / 48; Catherine Palacios / 49; Rebecca Spies / 65; (Molly Watcke) / (74); (Shayne Culpepper) / (78)	180
10	Russia: Galina Bogomolova / 32; Tatyana Tomashova / 37; Yelena Motalova / 53; Klara Kashapova / 59; (Svetlana Baygulova) / (75)	181
11	Spain: Amaia Piedra / 35; Jacqueline Martín / 41; Cristina Petite / 50; Sara Valderas / 68; (Natalia Azpiazu) / (70); (Rocío Rodriguez) / (86)	194
12	South Africa: Yolandi Buitendag / 44; Truzanne Swanepoel / 51; Charné Rademeyer / 64; Zena Wilsnach / 67	226
13	Brazil: Maria Rodrigues / 43; Rosângela Faria / 58; Rita de Jesús / 63; Marina Nascimento / 91; (Ana de Souza) / (99); (Dione D'Agostini) / (DNF)	255
14	Zimbabwe: Samukeliso Moyo / 20; Message Mapfumo / 73; Tarath Tsatsa / 90; Siphuluwazi Sibindi / 93; (Lucy Siwela) / (94); (Singasi Dube) / (95)	276
15	Ukraine: Anzhelika Averkova / 72; Olena Gorodnychova / 80; Tatyana Glazyr / 81; Nataliya Romanchuk / 92	325
16	India: Sunita Rani / 57; Mukti Roy / 89; Kunnam Parakkal Suma / 97; Madhuri Gurnule / 102	345
17	Belarus: Tatyana Buloichyk / 84; Natalya Kravets / 85; Olga Moroz / 96; Yelena Bychkovskaya / 100	365
18	Chile: Clara Morales / 87; Susana Rebolledo / 88; Anahi Soto / 98; Flor Venegas / 101	374

- Note: Athletes in parentheses did not score for the team result

== Participation ==
An unofficial count yields the participation of 109 athletes from 29 countries in the Women's short race. This is in agreement with the official numbers as published. The announced team from Australia did not show.

- Belarus (4)
- Bolivia (1)
- Brazil (6)
- Canada (6)
- Chile (4)
- Ethiopia (6)
- Finland (1)
- France (6)
- Germany (1)
- India (4)
- Ireland (6)
- Japan (1)
- Kenya (5)
- Mauritius (1)
- Morocco (5)
- Namibia (1)
- Poland (1)
- Romania (6)
- Russia (5)
- South Africa (4)
- Spain (6)
- Switzerland (1)
- Tanzania (2)
- Turkmenistan (3)
- Ukraine (4)
- United Kingdom (6)
- United States (6)
- Uzbekistan (1)
- Zimbabwe (6)

== See also ==
- 1999 IAAF World Cross Country Championships – Senior men's race
- 1999 IAAF World Cross Country Championships – Men's short race
- 1999 IAAF World Cross Country Championships – Junior men's race
- 1999 IAAF World Cross Country Championships – Senior women's race
- 1999 IAAF World Cross Country Championships – Junior women's race
