= 1999 IAAF World Cross Country Championships – Men's short race =

Men's short race at the 1999 IAAF World Cross Country Championships
- Organisers: IAAF
- Edition: 27th
- Date: March 27
- Host city: Belfast, Northern Ireland, United Kingdom
- Venue: Barnett Demesne/Queen’s University Playing Fields
- Events: 1
- Distances: 4.236 km – Men's short
- Participation: 144 athletes from 38 nations

The Men's short race at the 1999 IAAF World Cross Country Championships was held at the Barnett Demesne/Queen’s University Playing Fields in Belfast, Northern Ireland, United Kingdom, on March 27, 1999. Reports of the event were given in The New York Times, in the Glasgow Herald, and for the IAAF.

Complete results for individuals, for teams, medallists, and the results of British athletes who took part were published.

== Race results ==
=== Men's short race (4.236 km) ===
==== Individual ====
Rank	Athlete	Country	Time
1st place, gold medalist(s)	Benjamin Limo	Kenya	12:28
2nd place, silver medalist(s)	Paul Kosgei	Kenya	12:31
3rd place, bronze medalist(s)	Haylu Mekonnen	Ethiopia	12:35
4	Million Wolde	Ethiopia	12:36
5	James Koskei	Kenya	12:38
6	Daniel Gachara	Kenya	12:41
7	Abdellah Béhar	France	12:44
8	John Kosgei	Kenya	12:45
9	El Hassan Lahssini	Morocco	12:47
10	Mohamed Amyn	Morocco	12:50
11	Adil Kaouch	Morocco	12:52
12	Adam Goucher	United States	12:53
13	Driss El Himer	France	12:56
14	Stephen Rerimoi	Kenya	12:57
15	Ahmed Baday	Morocco	12:58
16	Luciano Di Pardo	Italy	12:59
17	Laïd Bessou	Algeria	13:00
18	Alene Emere	Ethiopia	13:05
19	David Heath	United Kingdom	13:05
20	Kamel Boulahfane	Algeria	13:06
21	Mark Carroll	Ireland	13:07
22	Hicham Bouaouiche	Morocco	13:09
23	Miroslav Vanko	Slovakia	13:09
24	Azzedine Zerdoum	Algeria	13:09
25	Mohamed Ezzher	France	13:10
26	Sam Haughian	United Kingdom	13:11
27	Shadrack Hoff	South Africa	13:12
28	Yousef El Nasri	Spain	13:12
29	Sean Kaley	Canada	13:13
30	Berhanu Addane	Ethiopia	13:14
31	Isaac Viciosa	Spain	13:15
32	Fabrice Belot	France	13:15
33	Angelo Carosi	Italy	13:16
34	Mike Openshaw	United Kingdom	13:17
35	Joël Bourgeois	Canada	13:18
36	Simone Zanon	Italy	13:19
37	Mustapha Essaïd	France	13:19
38	Jesús de la Fuente	Spain	13:19
39	Réda Benzine	Algeria	13:20
40	Salvatore Vincenti	Italy	13:21
41	Paolo Doglio	Ireland	13:22
42	Kevin Sullivan	Canada	13:23
43	Spencer Barden	United Kingdom	13:23
44	Julian Moorhouse	United Kingdom	13:23
45	Tom Nohilly	United States	13:24
46	Vítor Almeida	Portugal	13:24
47	Jason Stewart	United States	13:25
48	Alberto García	Spain	13:26
49	John Morapedi	South Africa	13:27
50	Enoch Skosana	South Africa	13:27
51	Michael Ngaaseke	Zimbabwe	13:28
52	José Ramos	Portugal	13:28
53	Djamel Selatnia	Algeria	13:29
54	Angelo Pacheco	Portugal	13:29
55	Daniel Gidombada	Tanzania	13:30
56	Jeff Schiebler	Canada	13:31
57	Daniel Middleman	United States	13:34
58	Florin Ionescu	Romania	13:37
59	Adolphe Gahima	DR Congo	13:37
60	George Majaji	Zimbabwe	13:37
61	Ahmed Salman	Egypt	13:37
62	Mohamed Khaldi	Algeria	13:38
63	Metin Sazak	Turkey	13:38
64	Gennaro Di Napoli	Italy	13:38
65	Domenico D'Ambrosio	Italy	13:40
66	Marco Rufo	Spain	13:41
67	Cormac Finnerty	Ireland	13:41
68	Israel dos Anjos	Brazil	13:41
69	Cormac Smith	Ireland	13:41
70	Jeremy Deere	Canada	13:42
71	Javier Carriqueo	Argentina	13:42
72	Debebe Lobegach	Ethiopia	13:42
73	Abdelhak El Gorch	Morocco	13:42
74	Brian Treacy	Ireland	13:43
75	Hélder Ornelas	Portugal	13:44
76	Dan Browne	United States	13:45
77	Aaron Gabonewe	South Africa	13:46
78	Stéphane Desaulty	France	13:46
79	Kudakwashe Shoko	Zimbabwe	13:46
80	Tsungai Mwanengeni	Zimbabwe	13:47
81	Delfim Conceição	Portugal	13:47
82	Juan José Cruz	Argentina	13:49
83	Leonardo Malgor	Argentina	13:50
84	João Leite	Brazil	13:51
85	Cian McLoughlin	Ireland	13:52
86	Johan de Koning	Netherlands	13:53
87	Fatih Cintimar	Turkey	13:54
88	Wael Anwar	Egypt	13:55
89	Heiki Sarapuu	Estonia	13:57
90	Márcio da Silva	Brazil	13:58
91	Richard Mavuso	South Africa	13:58
92	Viktor Lomonosov	Belarus	13:59
93	Scott Strand	United States	14:00
94	Abd Al-Rasool Ahmed	Egypt	14:00
95	Maxwell Bangani	Zimbabwe	14:01
96	José de Oliveira	Brazil	14:02
97	Zeki Öztürk	Turkey	14:02
98	José Mansilla	Argentina	14:02
99	Marko Koers	Netherlands	14:04
100	Phillip Tulba	United Kingdom	14:05
101	Ricardo Franzon	Argentina	14:06
102	Sergey Dubina	Belarus	14:07
103	Simon Labiche	Seychelles	14:07
104	Abdul Abdullah	Yemen	14:08
105	Seref Ali Imamoglu	Turkey	14:09
106	Richard Tremain	Canada	14:10
107	Ahto Tatter	Estonia	14:10
108	Igor Zhavaranak	Belarus	14:12
109	Anwar O.M. Ali	Yemen	14:13
110	Aleksey Shestakov	Kazakhstan	14:15
111	Ales Tomic	Slovenia	14:15
112	Mohamed Al-Khawlani	Yemen	14:15
113	Yasunori Uchitomi	Japan	14:23
114	Sergey Zabavskiy	Tajikistan	14:23
115	Satish Kumar	India	14:26
116	Raveendra Kurbagatti	India	14:26
117	Alibay Shukurov	Azerbaijan	14:33
118	Fouly Salem	Egypt	14:33
119	Samer Al-Ifaai	Yemen	14:36
120	Maximillian Iranqhe	Tanzania	14:53
121	Sanjay Gond	India	14:56
122	Ronny Marie	Seychelles	15:03
123	Walid Ibrahim	Palestine	15:03
124	Sanjeev Nair	India	15:08
125	Vasiliy Andreyev	Uzbekistan	15:13
126	Djamched Rasulov	Tajikistan	15:14
127	Isireli Naikelekelevesi	Fiji	15:15
128	Aleksandr Titov	Belarus	15:15
129	Chokirjon Irmatov	Tajikistan	15:16
130	Selwyn Bonne	Seychelles	15:38
131	Bimiesh Kumar	Fiji	15:45
132	Moses Zarak Khan	Fiji	15:50
133	Alexandr Dyrov	Uzbekistan	15:56
134	Norbert Hariba	Seychelles	16:02
135	Niteshwar Prasad	Fiji	16:04
136	Esala Talebula	Fiji	16:05
137	Abhinesh Kumar Chand	Fiji	16:41
138	Aleksandr Levdanskiy	Kyrgyzstan	17:15
139	Gairat Nigmatov	Tajikistan	18:02
140	Baimurad Achirmuradov	Turkmenistan	18:32
141	Yevgeniy Nujdin	Uzbekistan	19:00
142	Satybek Chokayev	Kyrgyzstan	19:20
—	Abel Chimukoko	Zimbabwe	DNF
—	Mohamed Al-Bayed	Palestine	DNF
—	Alberto Maravilha	Portugal	DNS
—	José Luis Ebatela Nvó	Equatorial Guinea	DNS
—	Manuel Pancorbo	Spain	DNS
—	Antonio Fabián Silio	Argentina	DNS

==== Teams ====
Rank	Team	Points
1st place, gold medalist(s)	Kenya: Benjamin Limo / 1; Paul Kosgei / 2; James Koskei / 5; Daniel Gachara / 6; (John Kosgei) / (8); (Stephen Rerimoi) / (14)	14
2nd place, silver medalist(s)	Morocco: El Hassan Lahssini / 9; Mohamed Amyn / 10; Adil Kaouch / 11; Ahmed Baday / 15; (Hicham Bouaouiche) / (22); (Abdelhak El Gorch) / (73)	45
3rd place, bronze medalist(s)	Ethiopia: Haylu Mekonnen / 3; Million Wolde / 4; Alene Emere / 18; Berhanu Addane / 30; (Debebe Lobegach) / (72)	55
4	France: Abdellah Béhar / 7; Driss El Himer / 13; Mohamed Ezzher / 25; Fabrice Belot / 32; (Mustapha Essaïd) / (37); (Stéphane Desaulty) / (78)	77
5	Algeria: Laïd Bessou / 17; Kamel Boulahfane / 20; Azzedine Zerdoum / 24; Réda Benzine / 39; (Djamel Selatnia) / (53); (Mohamed Khaldi) / (62)	100
6	United Kingdom: David Heath / 19; Sam Haughian / 26; Mike Openshaw / 34; Spencer Barden / 43; (Julian Moorhouse) / (44); (Phillip Tulba) / (100)	122
7	Italy: Luciano Di Pardo / 16; Angelo Carosi / 33; Simone Zanon / 36; Salvatore Vincenti / 40; (Gennaro Di Napoli) / (64); (Domenico D'Ambrosio) / (65)	125
8	Spain: Yousef El Nasri / 28; Isaac Viciosa / 31; Jesús de la Fuente / 38; Alberto García / 48; (Marco Rufo) / (66)	145
9	United States: Adam Goucher / 12; Tom Nohilly / 45; Jason Stewart / 47; Daniel Middleman / 57; (Dan Browne) / (76); (Scott Strand) / (93)	161
10	Canada: Sean Kaley / 29; Joël Bourgeois / 35; Kevin Sullivan / 42; Jeff Schiebler / 56; (Jeremy Deere) / (70); (Richard Tremain) / (106)	162
11	Ireland: Mark Carroll / 21; Paolo Doglio / 41; Cormac Finnerty / 67; Cormac Smith / 69; (Brian Treacy) / (74); (Cian McLoughlin) / (85)	198
12	South Africa: Shadrack Hoff / 27; John Morapedi / 49; Enoch Skosana / 50; Aaron Gabonewe / 77; (Richard Mavuso) / (91)	203
13	Portugal: Vítor Almeida / 46; José Ramos / 52; Angelo Pacheco / 54; Hélder Ornelas / 75; (Delfim Conceição) / (81)	227
14	Zimbabwe: Michael Ngaaseke / 51; George Majaji / 60; Kudakwashe Shoko / 79; Tsungai Mwanengeni / 80; (Maxwell Bangani) / (95); (Abel Chimukoko) / (DNF)	270
15	Argentina: Javier Carriqueo / 71; Juan José Cruz / 82; Leonardo Malgor / 83; José Mansilla / 98; (Ricardo Franzon) / (101)	334
16	Brazil: Israel dos Anjos / 68; João Leite / 84; Márcio da Silva / 90; José de Oliveira / 96	338
17	Turkey: Metin Sazak / 63; Fatih Cintimar / 87; Zeki Öztürk / 97; Seref Ali Imamoglu / 105	352
18	Egypt: Ahmed Salman / 61; Wael Anwar / 88; Abd Al-Rasool Ahmed / 94; Fouly Salem / 118	361
19	Belarus: Viktor Lomonosov / 92; Sergey Dubina / 102; Igor Zhavaranak / 108; Aleksandr Titov / 128	430
20	Yemen: Abdul Abdullah / 104; Anwar O.M. Ali / 109; Mohamed Al-Khawlani / 112; Samer Al-Ifaai / 119	444
21	India: Satish Kumar / 115; Raveendra Kurbagatti / 116; Sanjay Gond / 121; Sanjeev Nair / 124	476
22	Seychelles: Simon Labiche / 103; Ronny Marie / 122; Selwyn Bonne / 130; Norbert Hariba / 134	489
23	Tajikistan: Sergey Zabavskiy / 114; Djamched Rasulov / 126; Chokirjon Irmatov / 129; Gairat Nigmatov / 139	508
24	Fiji: Isireli Naikelekelevesi / 127; Bimiesh Kumar / 131; Moses Zarak Khan / 132; Niteshwar Prasad / 135; (Esala Talebula) / (136); (Abhinesh Kumar Chand) / (137)	525

- Note: Athletes in parentheses did not score for the team result

== Participation ==
An unofficial count yields the participation of 144 athletes from 38 countries in the Men's short race. This is in agreement with the official numbers as published. The announced athlete from Equatorial Guinea did not show.

- Algeria (6)
- Argentina (5)
- Azerbaijan (1)
- Belarus (4)
- Brazil (4)
- Canada (6)
- DR Congo (1)
- Egypt (4)
- Estonia (2)
- Ethiopia (5)
- Fiji (6)
- France (6)
- India (4)
- Ireland (6)
- Italy (6)
- Japan (1)
- Kazakhstan (1)
- Kenya (6)
- Kyrgyzstan (2)
- Morocco (6)
- Netherlands (2)
- Palestine (2)
- Portugal (5)
- Romania (1)
- Seychelles (4)
- Slovakia (1)
- Slovenia (1)
- South Africa (5)
- Spain (5)
- Tajikistan (4)
- Tanzania (2)
- Turkey (4)
- Turkmenistan (1)
- United Kingdom (6)
- United States (6)
- Uzbekistan (3)
- Yemen (4)
- Zimbabwe (6)

== See also ==
- 1999 IAAF World Cross Country Championships – Senior men's race
- 1999 IAAF World Cross Country Championships – Junior men's race
- 1999 IAAF World Cross Country Championships – Senior women's race
- 1999 IAAF World Cross Country Championships – Women's short race
- 1999 IAAF World Cross Country Championships – Junior women's race
