= 1999 IAAF World Cross Country Championships – Junior women's race =

Junior women's race at the 1999 IAAF World Cross Country Championships
- Organisers: IAAF
- Edition: 27th
- Date: March 27
- Host city: Belfast, Northern Ireland, United Kingdom
- Venue: Barnett Demesne/Queen’s University Playing Fields
- Events: 1
- Distances: 6.124 km – Junior women
- Participation: 124 athletes from 34 nations

The Junior women's race at the 1999 IAAF World Cross Country Championships was held at the Barnett Demesne/Queen’s University Playing Fields in Belfast, Northern Ireland, United Kingdom, on March 27, 1999. Reports of the event were given in The New York Times, in the Herald, and for the IAAF.

Complete results for individuals, for junior women's teams, medallists, and the results of British athletes who took part were published.

== Race results ==
=== Junior women's race (6.124 km) ===
==== Individual ====
Rank	Athlete	Country	Time
1st place, gold medalist(s)	Worknesh Kidane	Ethiopia	21:26
2nd place, silver medalist(s)	Vivian Cheruiyot	Kenya	21:37
3rd place, bronze medalist(s)	Yoshiko Fujinaga	Japan	21:41
4	Hareg Sidelil	Ethiopia	21:44
5	Naoko Sakata	Japan	21:46
6	Merima Hashim	Ethiopia	21:50
7	Helena Volná	Czech Republic	21:53
8	Pamela Kiyara	Kenya	21:59
9	Elvan Abeye	Ethiopia	22:03
10	Flomena Cheyech	Kenya	22:07
11	Jackline Chemwok	Kenya	22:14
12	Elizabeth Rumokol	Kenya	22:15
13	Inês Monteiro	Portugal	22:21
14	Hirut Abera	Ethiopia	22:23
15	Hana Chaouach	Tunisia	22:26
16	Deborah Chepkorir	Kenya	22:30
17	Jane Makombe	Zimbabwe	22:30
18	Yoshiko Watanabe	Japan	22:34
19	Linda Roets	South Africa	22:35
20	Rina Fujioka	Japan	22:36
21	Erin Sullivan	United States	22:37
22	Yolandi Neuhoff	South Africa	22:37
23	Lize-Mari Venter	South Africa	22:40
24	Kazuko Kanno	Japan	22:45
25	Minna Myllykoski	Finland	22:48
26	Hanane Ouhaddou	Morocco	22:48
27	Hiromi Fujii	Japan	22:49
28	Tonia Carstens	South Africa	22:51
29	Yelena Samokhvalova	Russia	22:53
30	Sabrina Mockenhaupt	Germany	22:53
31	Tatyana Gerasimova	Russia	22:59
32	Madaí Pérez	Mexico	23:00
33	Sibel Özyurt	Turkey	23:06
34	Bezunesh Bekele	Ethiopia	23:08
35	Türkan Erişmiş	Turkey	23:08
36	Fouzia Zoutat	Algeria	23:09
37	Tausi Saidi	Tanzania	23:13
38	Sikulile Sibanda	Zimbabwe	23:16
39	Lina Usmanova	Russia	23:17
40	Siphuluwazi Sibindi	Zimbabwe	23:17
41	René Kalmer	South Africa	23:27
42	Ashley Labudde	United States	23:28
43	Kenza Dahmani	Algeria	23:31
44	Tuula Laitinen	Finland	23:34
45	Nassira Taibi	Algeria	23:36
46	Tezeta Sürekli	Turkey	23:37
47	Caroline Walsh	United Kingdom	23:38
48	Lucy Siwela	Zimbabwe	23:40
49	Saloua Hassani	Algeria	23:40
50	Fatiha Bahi	Algeria	23:41
51	Minna Nummela	Finland	23:42
52	Caroline Annis	United States	23:44
53	Irene Alfonso	Spain	23:46
54	Malika Mejdoub	Morocco	23:46
55	Cheryl Smith	United States	23:47
56	Sultana Aït Hammou	Morocco	23:54
57	Lucélia Peres	Brazil	23:55
58	Rosana Fernández	Spain	23:59
59	Riina Tolonen	Finland	24:00
60	Tara Struyk	Canada	24:03
61	Ann-Marie Larkin	Ireland	24:03
62	Ana Castro	Spain	24:05
63	Cristina Alvarez	Spain	24:07
64	Louise Kelly	United Kingdom	24:08
65	Emily Kroshus	Canada	24:11
66	Dana Boyle	United States	24:12
67	Emma Ward	United Kingdom	24:12
68	Anna Markelova	Turkmenistan	24:13
69	Caroline Daly	Ireland	24:13
70	Latifa El Mekkaoui	Morocco	24:14
71	Kary Tripp	Mexico	24:29
72	Mebarka Zellit	Algeria	24:34
73	Sara Gorton	United States	24:35
74	Jennifer Handley	Canada	24:36
75	Alessia Lutskovskaya	Russia	24:37
76	Swata Muchaneta	Zimbabwe	24:41
77	Emilie Rollier	France	24:41
78	Valquíria Santos	Brazil	24:42
79	Catherine Lamb	Australia	24:43
80	Claire Colmer	United Kingdom	24:43
81	Ayfer Yigit	Turkey	24:45
82	Dina Mijuskovic	Croatia	24:47
83	Sanne Bakker	Netherlands	24:48
84	Natalya Razhkova	Belarus	24:48
85	Mélissa Benoumeur	Belgium	24:50
86	Beata Naigambo	Namibia	24:51
87	Federica Dal Ri	Italy	24:52
88	Claudia Ramirez	Colombia	24:52
89	Susan Partridge	United Kingdom	24:53
90	Anna Incerti	Italy	24:53
91	Mary Cullen	Ireland	25:01
92	Gemma Masnou	Spain	25:04
93	Keli de Godoy	Brazil	25:06
94	Krystina Kirova	Belarus	25:11
95	Deirdre Byrne	Ireland	25:15
96	Gülten Öztürk	Turkey	25:16
97	Aoife Byrne	Ireland	25:17
98	Tamara Budija	Croatia	25:18
99	Letitia Pheleu	South Africa	25:19
100	Martha Ronceria	Colombia	25:20
101	Émilie Mondor	Canada	25:21
102	Alex Carter	United Kingdom	25:25
103	Ciara Broe	Ireland	25:27
104	Sara Berti	Italy	25:31
105	Emily Tallen	Canada	25:37
106	Sonia Bejarano	Spain	25:43
107	Amarjit Kaur	India	26:02
108	Irina Ryzhkova	Belarus	26:08
109	Anastasiya Padalinskaya	Belarus	26:13
110	Luana Pocorobba	Italy	26:16
111	Megan Metcalfe	Canada	26:24
112	Swathi Gurnule	India	26:36
113	Jisha Thomas	India	26:37
114	Andrea Nieto	Colombia	26:38
115	Claudia Barajas	Colombia	26:39
116	Tina Gacina	Croatia	28:05
117	Kalpana Morey	India	28:51
118	Leyla Dzhumayeva	Turkmenistan	29:48
119	Olesy Jovnir	Turkmenistan	30:39
120	Saeda A.Y. Amro	Palestine	32:45
—	Viktoriya Brigadnaya	Turkmenistan	DNF
—	Tatiane Sá	Brazil	DNF
—	Malika Asahssah	Morocco	DNF
—	Nadia Ejjafini	Morocco	DQ^{†}

^{†}: Nadia Ejjafini of Morocco was the original 21st-place finisher in 22:37 min, but was disqualified for age falsification.

==== Teams ====
Rank	Team	Points
1st place, gold medalist(s)	Ethiopia: Worknesh Kidane / 1; Hareg Sidelil / 4; Merima Hashim / 6; Elvan Abeye / 9; (Hirut Abera) / (14); (Bezunesh Bekele) / (34)	20
2nd place, silver medalist(s)	Kenya: Vivian Cheruiyot / 2; Pamela Kiyara / 8; Flomena Cheyech / 10; Jackline Chemwok / 11; (Elizabeth Rumokol) / (12); (Deborah Chepkorir) / (16)	31
3rd place, bronze medalist(s)	Japan: Yoshiko Fujinaga / 3; Naoko Sakata / 5; Yoshiko Watanabe / 18; Rina Fujioka / 20; (Kazuko Kanno) / (24); (Hiromi Fujii) / (27)	46
4	South Africa: Linda Roets / 19; Yolandi Neuhoff / 22; Lize-Mari Venter / 23; Tonia Carstens / 28; (René Kalmer) / (41); (Letitia Pheleu) / (99)	92
5	Zimbabwe: Jane Makombe / 17; Sikulile Sibanda / 38; Siphuluwazi Sibindi / 40; Lucy Siwela / 48; (Swata Muchaneta) / (76)	143
6	United States: Erin Sullivan / 21; Ashley Labudde / 42; Caroline Annis / 52; Cheryl Smith / 55; (Dana Boyle) / (66); (Sara Gorton) / (73)	170^{†}
7	Algeria: Fouzia Zoutat / 36; Kenza Dahmani / 43; Nassira Taibi / 45; Saloua Hassani / 49; (Fatiha Bahi) / (50); (Mebarka Zellit) / (72)	173^{†}
8	Russia: Yelena Samokhvalova / 29; Tatyana Gerasimova / 31; Lina Usmanova / 39; Alessia Lutskovskaya / 75	174^{†}
9	Finland: Minna Myllykoski / 25; Tuula Laitinen / 44; Minna Nummela / 51; Riina Tolonen / 59	179^{†}
10	Turkey: Sibel Özyurt / 33; Türkan Erişmiş / 35; Tezeta Sürekli / 46; Ayfer Yigit / 81; (Gülten Öztürk) / (96)	195^{†}
11	Morocco: Hanane Ouhaddou / 26; Malika Mejdoub / 54; Sultana Aït Hammou / 56; Latifa El Mekkaoui / 70; (Malika Asahssah) / (DNF)	206^{†}
12	Spain: Irene Alfonso / 53; Rosana Fernández / 58; Ana Castro / 62; Cristina Alvarez / 63; (Gemma Masnou) / (92); (Sonia Bejarano) / (106)	236
13	United Kingdom: Caroline Walsh / 47; Louise Kelly / 64; Emma Ward / 67; Claire Colmer / 80; (Susan Partridge) / (89); (Alex Carter) / (102)	258
14	Canada: Tara Struyk / 60; Emily Kroshus / 65; Jennifer Handley / 74; Émilie Mondor / 101; (Emily Tallen) / (105); (Megan Metcalfe) / (111)	300
15	Ireland: Ann-Marie Larkin / 61; Caroline Daly / 69; Mary Cullen / 91; Deirdre Byrne / 95; (Aoife Byrne) / (97); (Ciara Broe) / (103)	316
16	Italy: Federica Dal Ri / 87; Anna Incerti / 90; Sara Berti / 104; Luana Pocorobba / 110	391
17	Belarus: Natalya Razhkova / 84; Krystina Kirova / 94; Irina Ryzhkova / 108; Anastasiya Padalinskaya / 109	395
18	Colombia: Claudia Ramirez / 88; Martha Ronceria / 100; Andrea Nieto / 114; Claudia Barajas / 115	417
19	India: Amarjit Kaur / 107; Swathi Gurnule / 112; Jisha Thomas / 113; Kalpana Morey / 117	449
DNF	Brazil: (Lucélia Peres) / (57); (Valquíria Santos) / (78); (Keli de Godoy) / (93); (Tatiane Sá) / (DNF)	DNF
DNF	Turkmenistan: (Anna Markelova) / (68); (Leyla Dzhumayeva) / (118); (Olesy Jovnir) / (119); (Viktoriya Brigadnaya) / (DNF)	DNF

- Note: Athletes in parentheses did not score for the team result

^{†}: Nadia Ejjafini of Morocco was the original 21st-place finisher in 22:37 min, but was disqualified for age falsification affecting the team scores.

== Participation ==
An unofficial count yields the participation of 124 athletes from 34 countries in the Junior women's race. This is in agreement with the official numbers as published.

- Algeria (6)
- Australia (1)
- Belarus (4)
- Belgium (1)
- Brazil (4)
- Canada (6)
- Colombia (4)
- Croatia (3)
- Czech Republic (1)
- Ethiopia (6)
- Finland (4)
- France (1)
- Germany (1)
- India (4)
- Ireland (6)
- Italy (4)
- Japan (6)
- Kenya (6)
- Mexico (2)
- Morocco (6)
- Namibia (1)
- Netherlands (1)
- Palestine (1)
- Portugal (1)
- Russia (4)
- South Africa (6)
- Spain (6)
- Tanzania (1)
- Tunisia (1)
- Turkey (5)
- Turkmenistan (4)
- United Kingdom (6)
- United States (6)
- Zimbabwe (5)

== See also ==
- 1999 IAAF World Cross Country Championships – Senior men's race
- 1999 IAAF World Cross Country Championships – Men's short race
- 1999 IAAF World Cross Country Championships – Junior men's race
- 1999 IAAF World Cross Country Championships – Senior women's race
- 1999 IAAF World Cross Country Championships – Women's short race
