= 1999 IAAF World Cross Country Championships =

Coordinates: 54°33′N 5°58′W

- Organisers: IAAF
- Edition: 27th
- Date: 27–28 March
- Host city: Belfast, United Kingdom
- Venue: Barnett Demesne/Queen's University Playing Fields
- Events: 6
- Distances: 12 km – Senior men 4.236 km – Men's short 8.012 km – Junior men 8.012 km – Senior women 4.236 km – Women's short 6.124 km – Junior women
- Participation: 759 athletes from 66 nations

The 1999 IAAF World Cross Country Championships took place on 27 and 28 March 1999. The races were held at the Barnett Demesne/Queen's University Playing Fields in Belfast, United Kingdom. Reports of the event were given in The New York Times, in the Herald, and for the IAAF.

Complete results for senior men, for senior men's teams, for men's short race, for men's short race teams, for junior men, for junior men's teams, senior women, for senior women's teams, for women's short race, for women's short race teams, for junior women, for junior women's teams, medallists, and the results of British athletes who took part were published.

== Medallists ==
Event	Gold		Silver		Bronze	
Individual
Senior men (12 km)	Paul Tergat; Kenya	38:28	Patrick Ivuti; Kenya	38:32	Paulo Guerra; Portugal	38:46
Men's short (4.236 km)	Benjamin Limo; Kenya	12:28	Paul Kosgei; Kenya	12:31	Haylu Mekonnen; Ethiopia	12:35
Junior men (8.012 km)	Haylu Mekonnen; Ethiopia	25:38	Richard Limo; Kenya	25:43	Kipchumba Mitei; Kenya	25:45
Senior women (8.012 km)	Gete Wami; Ethiopia	28:00	Merima Denboba; Ethiopia	28:12	Paula Radcliffe; United Kingdom	28:12
Women's short (4.236 km)	Jackline Maranga; Kenya	15:09	Yamna Belkacem; France	15:16	Annemari Sandell; Finland	15:17
Junior women (6.124 km)	Worknesh Kidane; Ethiopia	21:26	Vivian Cheruiyot; Kenya	21:37	Yoshiko Fujinaga; Japan	21:41
Team
Senior men	Kenya	12	Ethiopia	57	Portugal	76
Men's short	Kenya	14	Morocco	45	Ethiopia	55
Junior men	Kenya	16	Ethiopia	24	Tanzania	77
Senior women	Ethiopia	18	Kenya	27	Portugal	94
Women's short	France	40	Ethiopia	48	Morocco	69
Junior women	Ethiopia	20	Kenya	31	Japan	46

== Race results ==
=== Senior men's race (12 km) ===
Individual race
Rank	Athlete	Country	Time
1st place, gold medalist(s)	Paul Tergat	Kenya	38:28
2nd place, silver medalist(s)	Patrick Ivuti	Kenya	38:32
3rd place, bronze medalist(s)	Paulo Guerra	Portugal	38:46
4	Joshua Chelanga	Kenya	39:05
5	Evans Rutto	Kenya	39:12
6	Paul Koech	Kenya	39:51
7	Mohammed Mourhit	Belgium	40:09
8	Jon Brown	United Kingdom	40:09
9	Habte Jifar	Ethiopia	40:21
10	Domingos Castro	Portugal	40:25
11	Assefa Mezegebu	Ethiopia	40:33
12	Róbert Štefko	Slovakia	40:39
Full results

Teams
Rank	Team	Points
1st place, gold medalist(s)	Kenya: Paul Tergat / 1; Patrick Ivuti / 2; Joshua Chelanga / 4; Evans Rutto / 5; (Paul Koech) / (6); (Tom Nyariki) / (39)	12
2nd place, silver medalist(s)	Ethiopia: Habte Jifar / 9; Assefa Mezegebu / 11; Girma Tolla / 17; Tesfaye Tola / 20; (Ayele Mezegebu) / (26); (Tegenu Abebe) / (37)	57
3rd place, bronze medalist(s)	Portugal: Paulo Guerra / 3; Domingos Castro / 10; Eduardo Henriques / 14; Alberto Maravilha / 49; (Alberto Chaíça) / (68); (João Junqueira) / (71)	76
4	Spain	103
5	Morocco	108
6	Italy	125
7	United States	133
8	United Kingdom	159
Full results

- Note: Athletes in parentheses did not score for the team result

=== Men's short race (4.236 km) ===
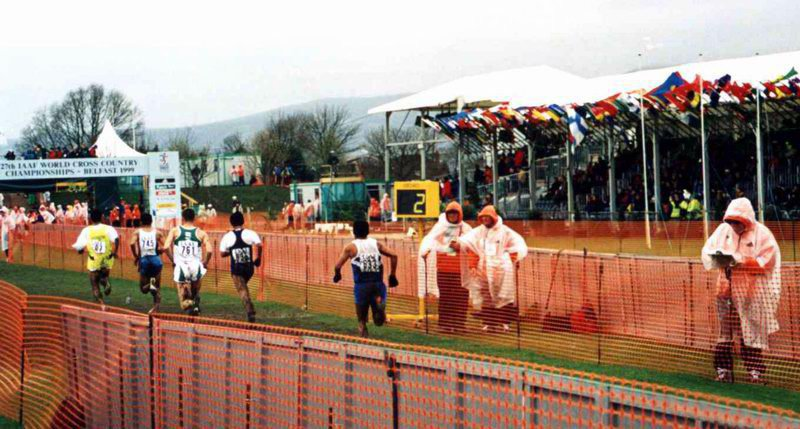
Runners in action at the championships

Individual race
Rank	Athlete	Country	Time
1st place, gold medalist(s)	Benjamin Limo	Kenya	12:28
2nd place, silver medalist(s)	Paul Kosgei	Kenya	12:31
3rd place, bronze medalist(s)	Haylu Mekonnen	Ethiopia	12:35
4	Million Wolde	Ethiopia	12:36
5	James Koskei	Kenya	12:38
6	Daniel Gachara	Kenya	12:41
7	Abdellah Béhar	France	12:44
8	John Kosgei	Kenya	12:45
9	El Hassan Lahssini	Morocco	12:47
10	Mohamed Amyn	Morocco	12:50
11	Adil Kaouch	Morocco	12:52
12	Adam Goucher	United States	12:53
Full results

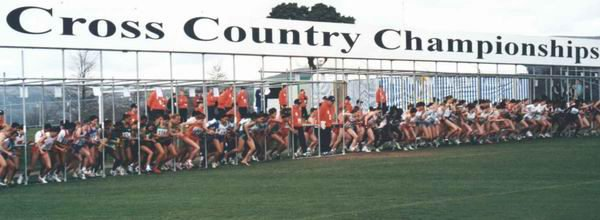
The starting point of the race

Teams
Rank	Team	Points
1st place, gold medalist(s)	Kenya: Benjamin Limo / 1; Paul Kosgei / 2; James Koskei / 5; Daniel Gachara / 6; (John Kosgei) / (8); (Stephen Rerimoi) / (14)	14
2nd place, silver medalist(s)	Morocco: El Hassan Lahssini / 9; Mohamed Amyn / 10; Adil Kaouch / 11; Ahmed Baday / 15; (Hicham Bouaouiche) / (22); (Abdelhak El Gorch) / (73)	45
3rd place, bronze medalist(s)	Ethiopia: Haylu Mekonnen / 3; Million Wolde / 4; Alene Emere / 18; Berhanu Addane / 30; (Debebe Lobegach) / (72)	55
4	France	77
5	Algeria	100
6	United Kingdom	122
7	Italy	125
8	Spain	145
Full results

- Note: Athletes in parentheses did not score for the team result

=== Junior men's race (8.012 km) ===
Individual race
Rank	Athlete	Country	Time
1st place, gold medalist(s)	Haylu Mekonnen	Ethiopia	25:38
2nd place, silver medalist(s)	Richard Limo	Kenya	25:43
3rd place, bronze medalist(s)	Kipchumba Mitei	Kenya	25:45
4	Abiyote Abate	Ethiopia	25:46
5	Albert Chepkurui	Kenya	26:01
6	Sammy Kipketer	Kenya	26:06
7	Duncan Lebo	Kenya	26:14
8	Faustin Baha	Tanzania	26:15
9	Kenenisa Bekele	Ethiopia	26:27
10	Yibeltal Admassu	Ethiopia	26:28
11	Hailemariam Tegafaw	Ethiopia	26:59
12	Alene Emere	Ethiopia	27:00
Full results

Teams
Rank	Team	Points
1st place, gold medalist(s)	Kenya: Richard Limo / 2; Kipchumba Mitei / 3; Albert Chepkurui / 5; Sammy Kipketer / 6; (Duncan Lebo) / (7); (Christopher Soget) / (14)	16
2nd place, silver medalist(s)	Ethiopia: Haylu Mekonnen / 1; Abiyote Abate / 4; Kenenisa Bekele / 9; Yibeltal Admassu / 10; (Hailemariam Tegafaw) / (11); (Alene Emere) / (12)	24
3rd place, bronze medalist(s)	Tanzania: Faustin Baha / 8; Michael Hiiti / 13; Martin Sulle / 15; Jumanne Tuluway / 41	77
4	Morocco	79
5	Algeria	116
6	United States	126
7	Spain	160
8	Japan	178
Full results

- Note: Athletes in parentheses did not score for the team result

=== Senior women's race (8.012 km) ===
Individual race
Rank	Athlete	Country	Time
1st place, gold medalist(s)	Gete Wami	Ethiopia	28:00
2nd place, silver medalist(s)	Merima Denboba	Ethiopia	28:12
3rd place, bronze medalist(s)	Paula Radcliffe	United Kingdom	28:12
4	Ayelech Worku	Ethiopia	28:15
5	Susan Chepkemei	Kenya	28:21
6	Jane Ngotho	Kenya	28:29
7	Jane Omoro	Kenya	28:40
8	Helena Sampaio	Portugal	28:42
9	Leah Malot	Kenya	28:49
10	Deena Drossin	United States	28:53
11	Leila Aman	Ethiopia	28:55
12	Restituta Joseph	Tanzania	29:07
Full results

Teams
Rank	Team	Points
1st place, gold medalist(s)	Ethiopia: Gete Wami / 1; Merima Denboba / 2; Ayelech Worku / 4; Leila Aman / 11; (Asha Gigi) / (32); (Meseret Kotu) / (64)	18
2nd place, silver medalist(s)	Kenya: Susan Chepkemei / 5; Jane Ngotho / 6; Jane Omoro / 7; Leah Malot / 9; (Agnes Kiprop) / (16)	27
3rd place, bronze medalist(s)	Portugal: Helena Sampaio / 8; Ana Dias / 13; Conceição Ferreira / 30; Mónica Rosa / 43; (Marina Bastos) / (DNF); (Teresa Nunes) / (DNF)	94
4	Australia	111
5	Romania	121
6	Japan	132
7	United Kingdom	134
8	United States	136
Full results

- Note: Athletes in parentheses did not score for the team result

=== Women's short race (4.236 km) ===
Individual race
Rank	Athlete	Country	Time
1st place, gold medalist(s)	Jackline Maranga	Kenya	15:09
2nd place, silver medalist(s)	Yamna Belkacem	France	15:16
3rd place, bronze medalist(s)	Annemari Sandell	Finland	15:17
4	Kathy Butler	Canada	15:30
5	Restituta Joseph	Tanzania	15:31
6	Alemitu Bekele	Ethiopia	15:37
7	Asmae Leghzaoui	Morocco	15:40
8	Teresa Wanjiku	Kenya	15:41
9	Fatima Yvelain	France	15:44
10	Blandine Bitzner-Ducret	France	15:47
11	Constantina Diţă	Romania	15:49
12	Kutre Dulecha	Ethiopia	15:50
Full results

Teams
Rank	Team	Points
1st place, gold medalist(s)	France: Yamna Belkacem / 2; Fatima Yvelain / 9; Blandine Bitzner-Ducret / 10; Celine Rajot / 19; (Rodica Nagel) / (46); (Joalsiae Llado) / (69)	40
2nd place, silver medalist(s)	Ethiopia: Alemitu Bekele / 6; Kutre Dulecha / 12; Lulit Legesse / 14; Genet Gebregiorgis / 16; (Yimenashu Taye) / (17); (Getenesh Urge) / (33)	48
3rd place, bronze medalist(s)	Morocco: Asmae Leghzaoui / 7; Seloua Ouaziz / 13; Zhor El Kamch / 24; Saliha Khaldoun / 25; (Bouchra Benthami) / (38)	69
4	Kenya	72
5	Romania	93
6	United Kingdom	125
7	Ireland	159
8	Canada	165
Full results

- Note: Athletes in parentheses did not score for the team result

=== Junior women's race (6.124 km) ===
Individual race
Rank	Athlete	Country	Time
1st place, gold medalist(s)	Worknesh Kidane	Ethiopia	21:26
2nd place, silver medalist(s)	Vivian Cheruiyot	Kenya	21:37
3rd place, bronze medalist(s)	Yoshiko Fujinaga	Japan	21:41
4	Hareg Sidelil	Ethiopia	21:44
5	Naoko Sakata	Japan	21:46
6	Merima Hashim	Ethiopia	21:50
7	Helena Volná	Czech Republic	21:53
8	Pamela Kiyara	Kenya	21:59
9	Elvan Abeye	Ethiopia	22:03
10	Flomena Cheyech	Kenya	22:07
11	Jackline Chemwok	Kenya	22:14
12	Elizabeth Rumokol	Kenya	22:15
Full results

Teams
Rank	Team	Points
1st place, gold medalist(s)	Ethiopia: Worknesh Kidane / 1; Hareg Sidelil / 4; Merima Hashim / 6; Elvan Abeye / 9; (Hirut Abera) / (14); (Bezunesh Bekele) / (34)	20
2nd place, silver medalist(s)	Kenya: Vivian Cheruiyot / 2; Pamela Kiyara / 8; Flomena Cheyech / 10; Jackline Chemwok / 11; (Elizabeth Rumokol) / (12); (Deborah Chepkorir) / (16)	31
3rd place, bronze medalist(s)	Japan: Yoshiko Fujinaga / 3; Naoko Sakata / 5; Yoshiko Watanabe / 18; Rina Fujioka / 20; (Kazuko Kanno) / (24); (Hiromi Fujii) / (27)	46
4	South Africa	92
5	Zimbabwe	143
6	United States	170^{†}
7	Algeria	173^{†}
8	Russia	174^{†}
Full results

- Note: Athletes in parentheses did not score for the team result

^{†}: Nadia Ejjafini of Morocco was the original 21st-place finisher in 22:37 min, but was disqualified for age falsification.

== Medal table (unofficial) ==
* Host nation (Great Britain)

Rank	Nation	Gold	Silver	Bronze	Total
1	Kenya	6	6	1	13
2	Ethiopia	5	4	2	11
3	France	1	1	0	2
4	Morocco	0	1	1	2
5	Portugal	0	0	3	3
6	Japan	0	0	2	2
7	Finland	0	0	1	1
7	Great Britain	0	0	1	1
7	Tanzania	0	0	1	1
Totals (9 entries)		12	12	12	36

- Note: Totals include both individual and team medals, with medals in the team competition counting as one medal.

== Participation ==
An unofficial count yields the participation of 759 athletes from 66 countries. This is in agreement with the official numbers as published. The announced athlete from Equatorial Guinea did not show.

- Algeria (24)
- Andorra (1)
- Argentina (5)
- Australia (18)
- Azerbaijan (1)
- Belarus (24)
- Belgium (9)
- Bolivia (1)
- Brazil (23)
- Bulgaria (1)
- Canada (33)
- Cape Verde (1)
- Chile (5)
- Colombia (12)
- DR Congo (1)
- Croatia (4)
- Czech Republic (1)
- Denmark (1)
- Ecuador (4)
- Egypt (8)
- Estonia (3)
- Ethiopia (34)
- Fiji (6)
- Finland (11)
- France (16)
- Germany (2)
- Guatemala (8)
- Hong Kong (1)
- India (24)
- Ireland (36)
- Israel (3)
- Italy (27)
- Japan (22)
- Kazakhstan (3)
- Kenya (34)
- Kyrgyzstan (6)
- Lesotho (5)
- Mauritius (7)
- Mexico (6)
- Morocco (29)
- Namibia (3)
- Netherlands (10)
- New Zealand (5)
- Palestine (6)
- Poland (2)
- Portugal (19)
- Romania (12)
- Russia (10)
- Seychelles (4)
- Slovakia (2)
- Slovenia (3)
- South Africa (25)
- Spain (35)
- Sweden (2)
- Switzerland (1)
- Tajikistan (4)
- Tanzania (12)
- Tunisia (7)
- Turkey (14)
- Turkmenistan (13)
- Ukraine (4)
- United Kingdom (36)
- United States (36)
- Uzbekistan (9)
- Yemen (8)
- Zimbabwe (17)

== See also ==
- 1999 IAAF World Cross Country Championships – Senior men's race
- 1999 IAAF World Cross Country Championships – Men's short race
- 1999 IAAF World Cross Country Championships – Junior men's race
- 1999 IAAF World Cross Country Championships – Senior women's race
- 1999 IAAF World Cross Country Championships – Women's short race
- 1999 IAAF World Cross Country Championships – Junior women's race
- 1999 in athletics (track and field)
