= Molly Watcke =

American long-distance runner

Medal record

Women's athletics

Representing United States

World Cross Country Championships
| Bronze medal – third place | 1998 Marrakesh | Team – Short Race |

Molly McClimon Watcke (born 10 April 1971) is an American long-distance runner who competes in distances from 1500 metres to the marathon.

== College career ==
She was a multiple time cross country and track and field All-American and Big Ten Conference champion for the University of Michigan. She was inducted into the University of Michigan Hall of Honor.

== Cross country career ==
At the 1998 IAAF World Cross Country Championships she finished 25th in the short race, earning a team bronze medal.

At the 1999 IAAF World Cross Country Championships she finished 74th in the short race.

== Road running career ==
She has multiple top-3 finishes in the Columbus Marathon.
