= Teresa Wanjiku =

Kenyan long-distance runner (born 1974)

Teresa Wanjiku Mbugua (born 7 May 1974) is a Kenyan long-distance runner who competed in road running and cross country running disciplines. She ran distances from the 10K run to the marathon and was active from 1997 to 2011.

Wanjiku represented Kenya at the 1999 IAAF World Cross Country Championships and placed eighth in the women's short race. She won numerous road races in the United States including the City of Pittsburgh Great Race (twice), Broad Street Run, Fifth Third River Bank Run (twice) and the Cherry Blossom Ten Mile Run.

== Personal bests ==
- 10K run – 31:01 min (2002)
- Half marathon – 71:42 min (2002)
- Marathon – 2:48:40 (2007)

All information from All-Athletics profile

== International competitions ==
Year	Competition	Venue	Position	Event	Notes
1999	World Cross Country Championships	Belfast, United Kingdom	8th	Short race	15:41
1999	World Cross Country Championships	Belfast, United Kingdom	4th	Senior team	72 pts

== Road race wins ==
- City of Pittsburgh Great Race: 1998, 2004
- Broad Street Run: 1998
- Fifth Third River Bank Run: 1999, 2002
- Cherry Blossom Ten Mile Run: 2000
- Phoenix 10K: 2001
- Medellín Half Marathon: 2002
- Parkersburg Half Marathon: 2002
- Bogotá Half Marathon: 2002
- Run Barbados Half Marathon: 2004
- Montreal Half Marathon: 2006
