= El Hassan Lahssini =

French long-distance runner

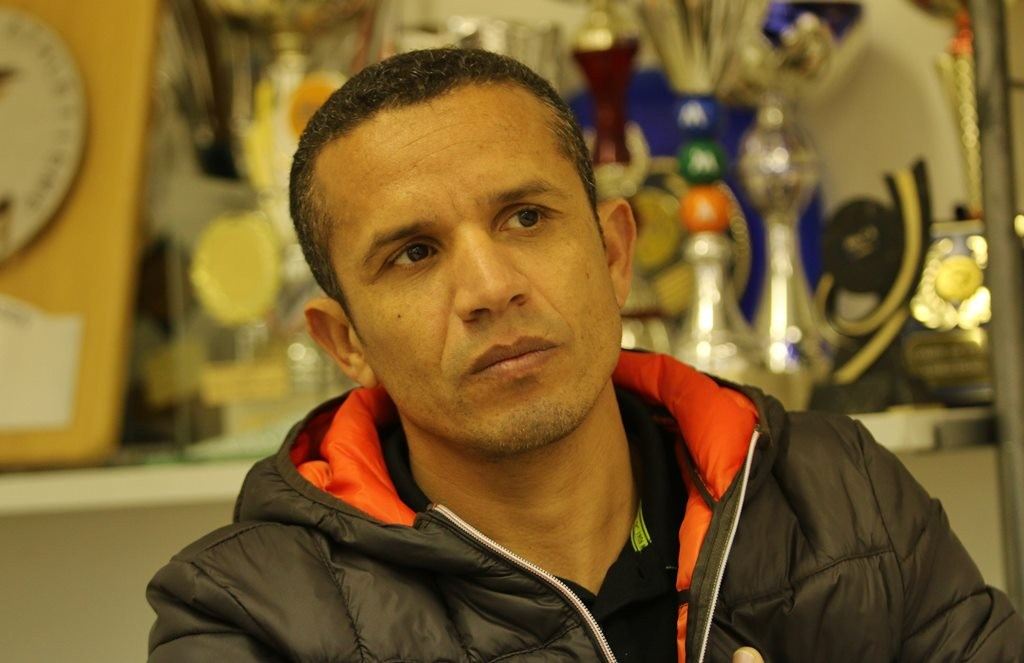
- Lahssini in 2015

Personal information
- Nationality: French
- Born: 1 January 1975 (age 51) Temara, Morocco

Sport
- Country: France
- Sport: Track, Long-distance running
- Event(s): 5000 metres, Marathon

El Hassan Lahssini (born 1 January 1975) is a French retired long-distance runner.

== International competition record ==
Year	Competition	Venue	Position	Event	Notes
Representing France
1996	Grand Prix Final	Milan, Italy	7th	5000 m	13:04.32
1997	World Indoor Championships	Paris, France	8th	3000 m	7:50.54
1997	World Championships	Athens, Greece	7th	5000 m	13:20.52
1998	World Cross Country Championships	Marrakesh, Morocco	18th	Men's short race	11:20
1999	World Cross Country Championships	Belfast, United Kingdom	9th	Men's short race	12:47
2003	European Cross Country Championships	Edinburgh, United Kingdom	8th	Men's race	31:29
2004	Olympic Games	Athens, Greece	36th	Marathon	2:19:50
2005	World Half Marathon Championships	Edmonton, Canada	—	Men's race	DNF
2007	European Cross Country Championships	Toro, Spain	8th	Men's race	32:08

== Personal bests ==
- 1500 metres – 3:38.88 (1997)
- 3000 metres – 7:30.53 (1996)
- Two miles – 8:17.39 (1999)
- 5000 metres – 13:04.32 (1996)
- 10,000 metres – 27:50.53 (2002)
- 10K run – 28:22 (2008)
- Half marathon – 1:02:28 (2003)
- 30 kilometres – 1:30:10 (2004)
- Marathon – 2:10:10 (2004)
