= São Paulo International Marathon =

Annual race in Brazil since 1995

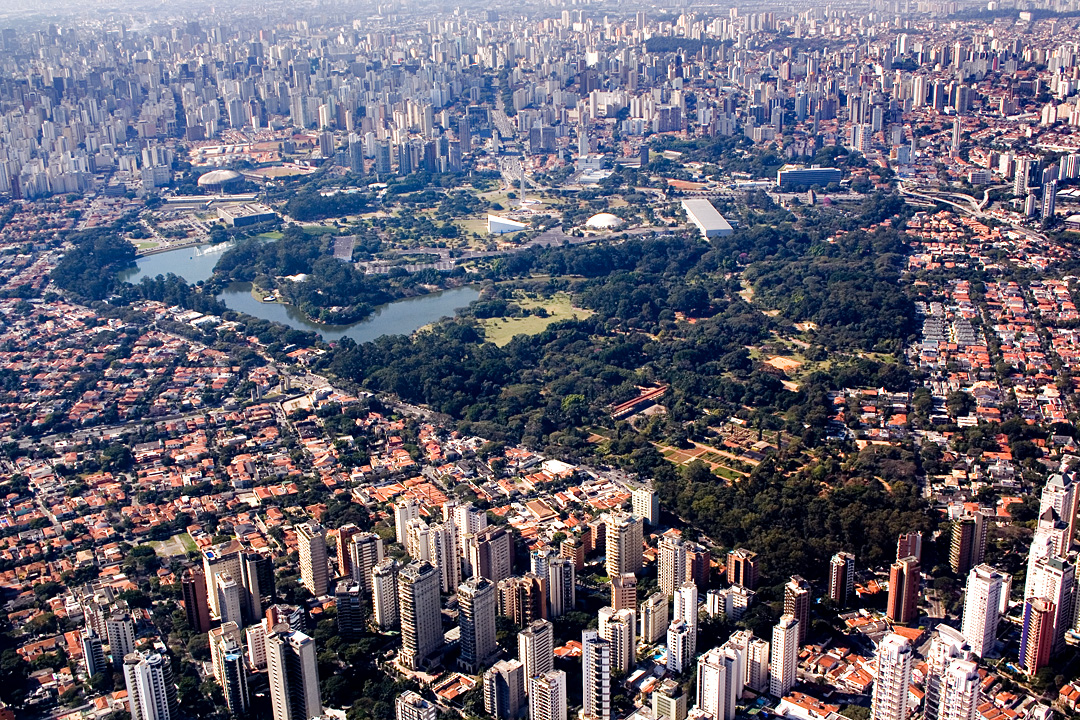
- Ibirapuera Park, where the races start and finish
- Date: April
- Location: São Paulo, Brazil
- Event type: Road
- Distance: Marathon, half marathon, 10K, 5K
- Established: 1995 (31 years ago)
- Website: São Paulo Int' Marathon

The São Paulo International Marathon (Note: The race logo stylizes the English name as "Sao Paulo Int'l Marathon", without the diacritic.) (Portuguese: Maratona Internacional de São Paulo) is an annual road-based marathon hosted by São Paulo, Brazil, since 1995. It was categorized as a Bronze Label Road Race by the International Association of Athletics Federations, and is the first race in Brazil to have achieved this distinction. The marathon is also a member of the Association of International Marathons and Distance Races. During the race weekend, a half marathon, a 10K race, and a 5K race are also offered.

== History ==
The inaugural race was held on 9 October 1995. The marathon was won by Brazilian runner Luíz Antônio dos Santos and Russian runner Nadezhda Wijenberg, with finish times of 2:17:11 and 2:39:33, respectively.

In 2000, Brazilian military parachutist and debut marathoner Alex Januario led for most of the race, but finished second after Kenyan runner David Ngetich passed him less than 3 km (1.9 mi) away from the finish line.

== Course ==
All the races start and finish in Ibirapuera Park.

== List of winners ==
Edition	Year	Men's winner	Time (m:s)	Women's winner	Time (m:s)
1st	1995	Luíz Antônio dos Santos (BRA)	2:17:11	Nadezhda Wijenberg (RUS)	2:39:33
2nd	1996	Chaham El Maati (MAR)	2:15:21	Janete Mayal (BRA)	2:41:40
3rd	1997	Vincent Cheruiyot (KEN)	2:17:02	Viviany de Oliveira (BRA)	2:42:13
4th	1998	Diamantino dos Santos (BRA)	2:16:55	Viviany de Oliveira (BRA)	2:39:59
5th	1999	Paul Yego (KEN)	2:15:20	Márcia Narloch (BRA)	2:37:19
6th	2000	David Ngetich (KEN)	2:15:21	Márcia Narloch (BRA)	2:40:15
7th	2001	Stephen Rugut (KEN)	2:14:30	Marizete de Paula (BRA)	2:38:57
8th	2002	Vanderlei de Lima (BRA)	2:11:20	Maria Zeferina Baldaia (BRA)	2:36:07
9th	2003	Genilson Júnior (BRA)	2:16:41	Maria do Carmo Arruda (KEN)	2:39:02
10th	2004	Franck de Almeida (BRA)	2:17:27	Margaret Toroitich (KEN)	2:40:10
11th	2005	José Teles de Souza (BRA)	2:19:47	Márcia Narloch (BRA)	2:40:39
12th	2006	Solomon Rotich (KEN)	2:15:15	Margaret Toroitich (KEN)	2:39:24
13th	2007	Reuben Chepwik (KEN)	2:16:05	Jackline Chebor (KEN)	2:40:12
14th	2008	Claudir Rodrigues (BRA)	2:17:07	Maria Zeferina Baldaia (BRA)	2:42:21
15th	2009	Elias Kemboi (KEN)	2:13:59	Marizete Moreira (BRA)	2:41:43
16th	2010	Stanley Biwott (KEN)	2:11:19	Marizete Moreira (BRA)	2:39:26
17th	2011	David Kiyeng (KEN)	2:11:51	Samira Raif (MAR)	2:36:01
18th	2012	Solonei da Silva (BRA)	2:12:25	Elizabeth Rumokol (KEN)	2:31:31
19th	2013	Stanley Koech (KEN)	2:16:04	Samira Raif (MAR)	2:38:21
20th	2014	Paul Kangogo (KEN)	2:14:18	Elizabeth Rumokol (KEN)	2:42:27
21st	2015	Asbel Kipsang (KEN)	2:15:14	Caroline Komen (KEN)	2:35:49
22nd	2016	Paul Kimutai (KEN)	2:17:14	Alice Jepkemboi (KEN)	2:35:56
23rd	2017	Paul Kimutai (KEN)	2:17:56	Leah Jerotich (KEN)	2:41:58
24th	2018	Solonei da Silva (BRA)	2:16:00	Andreia Hessel (BRA)	2:40:07
25th	2019	Pharis Kimani (KEN)	2:18:33	Sifan Melaku (ETH)	2:35:04
26th	2022	Tilahun Nigusie (ETH)	2:18:04	Kebebush Yisma (ETH)	2:37:40
27th	2023	Vestus Chemjor (KEN)	2:15:20	Yadne Alemayehu (ETH)	2:34:48
28th	2024	Nicholas Kiptoo (KEN)	2:16:25	Helen Baltazar (BOL)	2:50:13

=== Wins by country ===
Country	Men's	Women's	Total
Kenya	17	9	26
Brazil	9	12	21
Ethiopia	1	3	4
Morocco	1	2	3
Bolivia	0	1	1
Russia	0	1	1

== See also ==
- Saint Silvester Road Race
