= Tom Nohilly =

American track athlete

Personal information
- National team: United States
- Born: April 27, 1966 (age 60) Queens, New York, U.S.

Sport
- Sport: Track
- Events: 1500 meters, mile, 3000-meter steeplechase, 5000 meters
- College team: Florida

Achievements and titles
- Personal bests: 1500m: 3:41.26; Mile: 3:59.75; 3000m: 7:47.23; 3k steeple: 8:16.92; 5000m: 13:42.80

Tom Nohilly (born April 27, 1967) is an American retired track athlete who disciplined in various middle-distance and long-distance events. He represented the United States in the men's 3000-meter steeplechase at the 1997 World Championships in Athletics and the men's short race at the 1999 IAAF World Cross Country Championships. Nohilly was particularly prolific in the 3000-meter steeplechase, for which he made two appearances at the 1992 and 1996 U.S. Olympic Trials.

== Running career ==
=== High school ===
Nohilly attended Monsignor McClancy Memorial High School in East Elmhurst, Queens, where he graduated in 1984. He broke school records in the indoor and outdoor mile, indoor and outdoor 2 mile, outdoor 3 mile, outdoor 5000 meters, distance medley relay, steeplechase, as well as in various cross country distances. By the end of his senior year in high school in 1984, he finished third in the New York state championship meet, ran a personal best 4:12.2 in the 1600 meters and 9:24.3 in the 3200 meters.

=== Collegiate ===
Nohilly accepted an athletic scholarship to attend University of Florida, where he ran for the Florida Gators track and field team from 1986 to 1989. Although he spent much of the 1987 season injured, he became NCAA champion for the 3000-meter steeplechase in 1989.

=== Post-collegiate ===
On June 26, 1992, Nohilly ran a personal best time of 8:16.92 for the 3000-meter steeplechase at the 1992 U.S. Olympic Trials in New Orleans. Although Nohilly did not qualify for the Olympics, his 8:16.92 finish is one of the fastest steeplechase runs in U.S. track history, and as of 2022 is still in the top 20 fastest 3000-meter steeplechase times in the history of U.S. track and field.

On June 22, 1996, Nohilly finished yet again fourth place (just five meters behind Marc Davis) at the 1996 U.S. Olympic Trials for the 3000-meter steeplechase, barely missing a place in the U.S. Olympic team for the 1996 Summer Olympics.

On January 9, 1999, Nohilly ran the indoor mile at the 1999 New Balance Games at New York. Later that year he got a chance to represent the United States in international competition, running the men's short race in the 1999 IAAF World Cross Country Championships and finishing in 45th place out of 142 finishers.

Nohilly also holds the current course record in the Leatherman's Loop race, with a time of 38:36. He has won this race 9 times.
