= Agnes Kiprop =

Kenyan long-distance runner (born 1980)

Agnes Jepkemboi Kiprop (born January 14, 1980) is a Kenyan long-distance runner who competes in marathon events. Initially a cross country specialist, she has focused on marathons since 2008 and has won races in Reims, Turin, Frankfurt, Prague and Hannover. She holds a personal best of 2:23:54 hours for the event.

== Biography ==
Born in Marakwet, Kenya, her international debut came as a junior runner at the 1997 IAAF World Cross Country Championships, where she was one of six Kenyan youngsters in the top ten of the junior women's race. She featured again on the team at the 1998 edition, having won the junior trials, and she came seventh to help Kenya to the team silver medal. She was the winner of the 1999 Kenyan National Cross Country Championships in Nairobi. She failed to take this domestic form to the 1999 IAAF World Cross Country Championships, however, as she was the fifth Kenyan finisher and placed 16th overall in the women's long race.

She took a career break from running in order to start a family and she had her second child in 2007. Kiprop re-emerged as an elite senior marathon runner in 2008 and claimed victory on her debut at the Reims Marathon with a time of 2:32:37 hours. She also won domestically that year, taking the Baringo Half Marathon title in December. The following April she greatly improved her marathon best with a win at the Turin Marathon, where she completed a solo run to set a 2:26:22 course record time. She took a second win in the city that year at the Turin Half Marathon in September. This served as preparation for the Frankfurt Marathon, where she posted a time of 2:26:57 hours to win the race, having almost a minute as a margin of victory over Hellen Kimutai. She defended her title in Baringo at the end of the year, completing a year-long undefeated streak.

Her 2010 season began at the Ras Al Khaimah Half Marathon. She improved her best for the distance to 1:08:48 hours, but this was only enough for eighth at the high calibre race. Entering the 2010 Boston Marathon in April, she failed to win her fourth consecutive race and was far from her best with an eleventh place finish. She returned to defend her title at the Frankfurt Marathon and, in spite of a personal best run of 2:24:07, she came third behind Caroline Kilel and Dire Tune. She started her next season again at the Ras Al Khaimah race and improved to fifth place. She claimed the runner-up spot at the Paris Marathon two months later.

The 2011 Frankfurt Marathon saw her set a new personal best of 2:23:54 hours and she took second place behind Mamitu Daska. She knocked a minute off her best at the Roma-Ostia Half Marathon in February 2012 and her time of 1:07:22 hours brought her second place behind Florence Kiplagat. She dropped out of the 2012 Boston Marathon due to a bout of typhoid but was the surprise winner of the Prague International Marathon soon after, outrunning her more favoured training partner Lydia Cheromei. She returned to the Roma-Ostia race in 2013 and was runner-up again, this time to Filomena Cheyech. She has won the Hannover Marathon in Germany in 2018.

== Personal bests ==
- 10 kilometres – 31:57 min (2012)
- Half marathon – 1:07:22 (2012)
- Marathon – 2:23:54 hrs (2011)
