= Daniel Gachara =

Kenyan runner

Daniel Gachara (born 19 December 1972) is a Kenyan runner.

At the 1999 World Cross Country Championships he finished sixth in the short race, earning a place on the Kenyan team that won the team competition. He won the Belfast International Cross Country in 2001.
