= Philomena Cheyech =

Kenyan long-distance runner

Medal record

Women's athletics

Representing Kenya

Commonwealth Games
Gold medal – first place	2014 Glasgow	Marathon

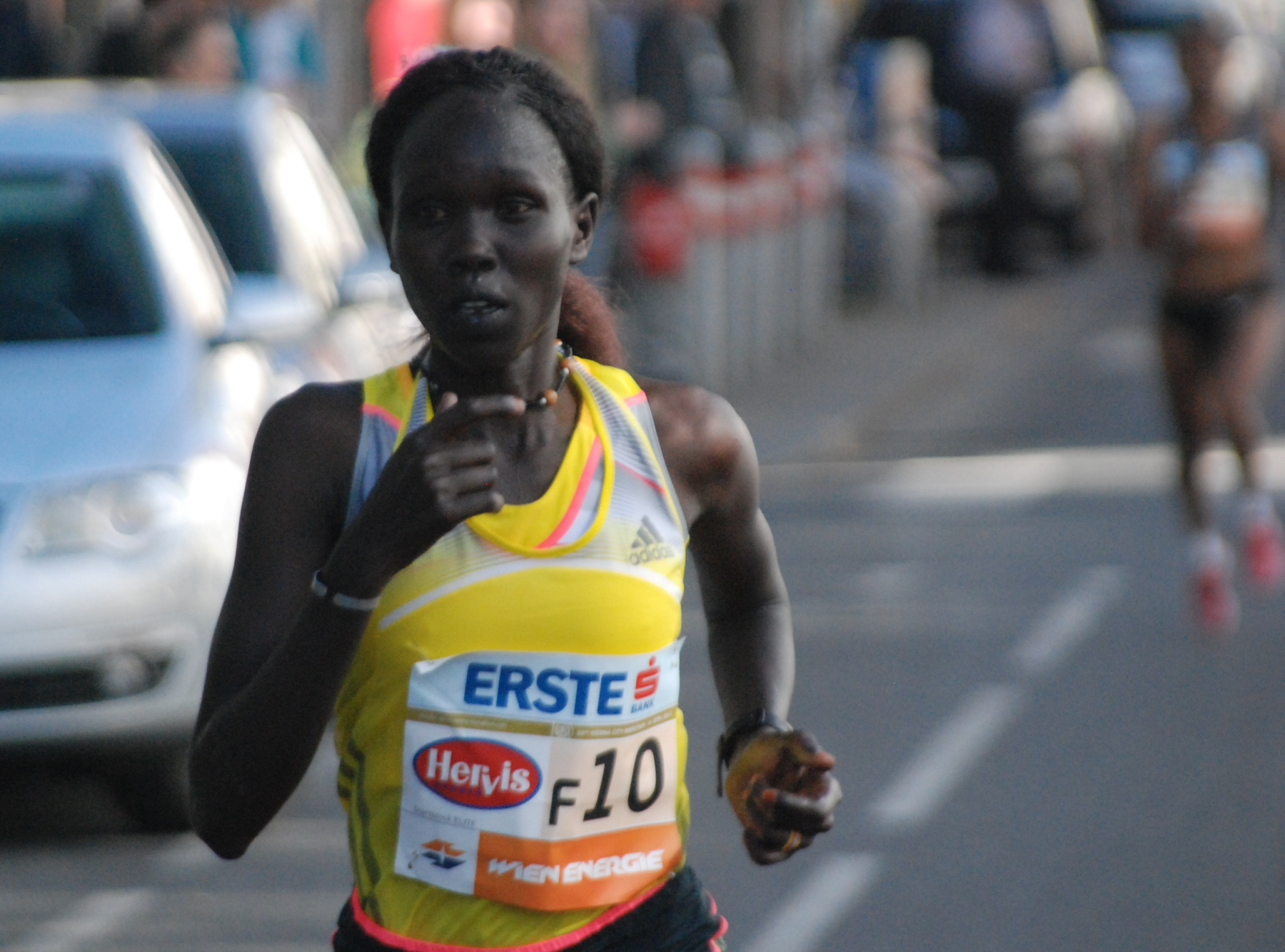
Flomena Cheyech 'enroute'; photograph shows the winner of 30th Vienna City Marathon, 2013 (women). Her time was 2:24:34.

Flomena Cheyech Daniel (born July 5, 1982 in West Pokot, Kenya) is a Kenyan athlete who competes in long distance and marathon races. She set her personal best of 2:22:44 winning the 2014 Paris Marathon and was a gold medalist at the 2014 Commonwealth Games. She represented Kenya at the 1999 IAAF Junior World Cross Country Championships in Dublin, Ireland and at the 2009 IAAF World Half Marathon Championships. She was based in Japan between 2007 and 2010, running for the Uniqlo corporate team, and was a two-time winner of the Japanese Corporate Half Marathon. She has also won marathons in Vienna and Toronto.

== Career ==
Daniel's international debut came as a junior at the 1999 IAAF World Cross Country Championships, where she ranked tenth individually and helped Kenya to the team silver medal. She later focused on the 10,000 metres track distance and improved from 33:22.3 minutes in 2004 to 33:10.5 minutes in 2006. That same year she ran her first marathon race at the Nairobi Marathon and placed seventh in a time of 2:42:31 hours.

Coached by Eric Kimaiyo in Japan's corporate running system, she set personal bests on the track of 9:16.21 minutes for the 3000 metres, 15:54.70 minutes for the 5000 metres and 32:47.98 minutes for the 10,000 m. She made her debut over the half marathon in the 2008 All-Japan Corporate Half Marathon Championships and was runner-up to Yukiko Akaba with a time of 69:06 minutes. That time ranked her 14th in the world that year for the distance. She again improved her bests in the Japanese track season with 15:38.83 minutes for the 5000 m and 31:58.50 minutes for the 10,000 m. She returned to the Corporate Half Marathon in 2009 and was the winner in a new best of 68:44 minutes. After a seventh-place finish at the Sapporo Half Marathon she was chosen to represent Kenya at the 2009 IAAF World Half Marathon Championships, where she came in eighth place. She also had success over 10,000 m that year, winning at the Hyogo Relays and coming third at the Japanese Corporate Track and Field Championships.

Daniel won her second Japanese Corporate title at the 2010 half marathon race and also placed third in Sapporo that year. She missed the rest of the season and all of 2011 after being dropped by the corporate team, only returning in mid-2012. She began to establish herself in the marathon, winning in Porto Alegre with a best of 2:34:13 hours then coming second at the Singapore Marathon. She began working with Gianni DeMadonna's training group in Italy. A series of road wins followed in 2013. She won the Roma-Ostia Half Marathon in a time of 67:39 minutes, knocking over a minute of her best and ranking ninth in the world that year. The Vienna Marathon proved to be a big breakthrough for Daniel: she ran the distance in 2:24:34 hours (an almost ten-minute improvement on the previous year) and won the race by a margin of nearly seven minutes. She was also the clear victor at the Toronto Waterfront Marathon in October.

Daniel's first big race of 2014 was the Ras Al-Khaimah Half Marathon and although she was defeated by Priscah Jeptoo, she was the runner-up in 68:13 minutes. She confirmed her ability over the longer marathon distance that April by winning the high-profile Paris Marathon with a new personal best of 2:22:44 hours – second-placed Yebrqual Meles was three and a half minutes behind her. She was chosen to represent Kenya in the marathon for the first time at the 2014 Commonwealth Games. In that race she was a clear leader throughout and in the final stages eased away from compatriot Caroline Kilel to win the gold medal – taking the first individual international medal of her career at the age of 32.

== Personal bests ==
- 3000 metres – 9:16.21 min (2007)
- 5000 metres – 15:19.47 min (2009)
- 10,000 metres – 31:58.50 min (2008)
- 10K run – 31:43 min (2010)
- Half marathon – 67:39 min (2013)
- Marathon – 2:22:44 min (2014)

== International competition record ==
Year	Competition	Venue	Position	Event	Notes
1999	IAAF World Cross Country Championships	Belfast, United Kingdom	10th	Junior race	
1999	IAAF World Cross Country Championships	Belfast, United Kingdom	2nd	Junior team	
2009	IAAF World Half Marathon Championships	Birmingham, United Kingdom	8th	Half marathon	
2014	Commonwealth Games	Glasgow, United Kingdom	1st	Marathon	
