= Leila Aman =

Ethiopian long-distance runner

Personal information
- National team: Ethiopia
- Born: 24 November 1977 (age 48) Arsi Zone, Ethiopia
- Spouse: Gemedu Defedo
- Relative: Dire Tune (sister-in-law)

Sport
- Sport: Athletics
- Event: Long-distance running

Leila Aman (born 24 November 1977) is an Ethiopian long-distance runner, who specializes in the half marathon and cross-country running. She placed fifth in the 2004 Berlin Marathon in 2:27:54. She was born in Arsi Zone.

In 2009, Aman's sister, mother, and father were shot and killed by her sister's husband, a police officer. Aman's sister-in-law is Dire Tune and her cousin-in-law is Teyba Erkesso. Her cousin and former coach is Haji Adilo, an elite distance running coach. She is married to Gemedu Dedefo, who is also an elite distance running coach.

== Achievements ==
| Year | Competition | Venue | Position | Event | Notes |
Representing Ethiopia
| 1999 | World Cross Country Championships | Belfast, United Kingdom | 11th | Long race | |
| 1999 | World Cross Country Championships | Belfast, United Kingdom | 1st | Team | |
| 2001 | World Cross Country Championships | Ostend, Belgium | 37th | Long race | |
| 2001 | World Cross Country Championships | Ostend, Belgium | 2nd | Team | |
| 2002 | World Cross Country Championships | Dublin, Ireland | 7th | Long race | |
| 2002 | World Cross Country Championships | Dublin, Ireland | 1st | Team | |
| 2003 | All-Africa Games | Abuja, Nigeria | 3rd | Marathon | 2:55:07 |
| 2004 | Dubai Marathon | Dubai, United Arab Emirates | 1st | Marathon | 2:42:36 |
| 2004 | Prague Marathon | Prague, Czech Republic | 1st | Marathon | 2:31:48 |

=== Personal bests ===
- 10,000 metres – 32:55.89 min (2003)
- Half marathon – 1:11:10 min (2002)
- Marathon – 2:27:54 min (2004)
