= Elizabeth Rumokol =

Kenyan long-distance runner

Elizabeth Chepkwana Rumokol (born 26 June 1983) is a Kenyan long-distance runner, who began as a cross country runner before moving into road running, including the marathon. She twice represented her country at the IAAF World Cross Country Championships.

Rumokol made her international debut for Kenya at the 1999 IAAF World Cross Country Championships, finishing twelfth in the junior race. At the 2003 World Cross Country Championships she finished sixth in the long race, while the Kenyan team, of which Rumokol was a part, won the silver medal in the team competition. She was the 2005 winner at the Oeiras International Cross Country. She struggled to reach the top of the national cross country running scene and began taking part in road races, winning the second edition of the Tegla Loroupe Peace Race in 2004. She took a three-year break from the sport from December 2005 to mid 2008.

She enjoyed an undefeated streak for the whole of 2017, spanning five marathons. She topped the podium at the Madrid Marathon, Kuala Lumpur Marathon, Bali Marathon, Borobudur Marathon and Milo Marathon. She had almost managed the same feat in the 2015, with wins at the Zheng-Kai International Marathon, Bali Marathon and Nairobi Marathon, though she was beaten into the runner-up spot by Caroline Komen Chemutai at the São Paulo Marathon. At the 2015 Nairobi race she ran a personal best of 2:29:32 hours.

== Personal bests ==
- 3000 metres - 9:00.0 min (2000)
- 10,000 metres - 33:20.1 min (2003)
- Half marathon – 1:11:12 (2009)
- Marathon – 2:29:32 (2015)
