= Nicholas Harrison (athlete) =

Australian long-distance runner

Personal information
- Nationality: Australian
- Born: 18 October 1970 (age 55) Melbourne, Australia

Sport
- Sport: Long-distance running
- Event: Marathon

Nicholas Harrison (born 18 October 1970) is an Australian former long-distance runner. He competed in the men's marathon at the 2004 Summer Olympics.
