= Girma Tolla =

Ethiopian long-distance runner

Girma Tolla (born 13 October 1975) is an Ethiopian long-distance runner, who specializes in the marathon race, having previously concentrated on the 10,000 metres.

== Achievements ==
Year	Competition	Venue	Position	Event	Notes
Representing Ethiopia
1999	World Cross Country Championships	Belfast, Northern Ireland	2nd	Team	
1999	World Championships	Seville, Spain	4th	10,000 m	28:02.08
2000	Olympic Games	Sydney, Australia	11th	10,000 m	27:49.75
2004	Enschede Marathon	Enschede, Netherlands	1st	Marathon	2:10:33

=== Personal bests ===
- 3000 metres - 7:42.98 min (1999)
- 5000 metres - 13:15.72 min (1998)
- 10,000 metres - 27:13.48 min (1999)
- Half marathon - 1:02:06 hrs (2003)
- Marathon - 2:10:33 hrs (2004)
