= Joshua Chelanga =

Kenyan long-distance runner

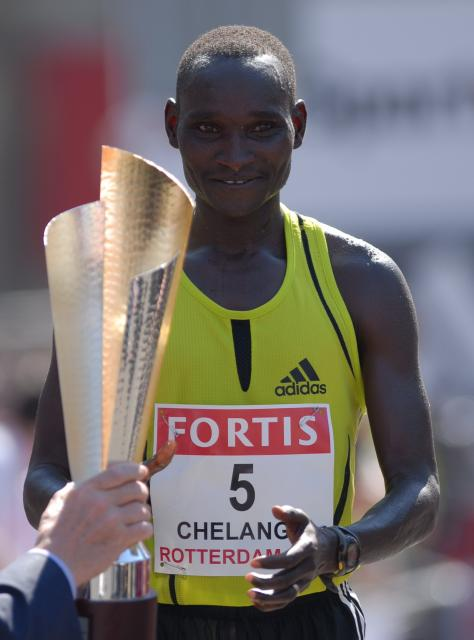

Medal record

Men's athletics

Representing Kenya

Commonwealth Games
Silver medal – second place	2002 Manchester	Marathon

Joshua Chelanga (born 7 April 1973) is a Kenyan long-distance runner who won the 2007 edition of the Rotterdam Marathon on April 15, clocking 2:08:21. Chelanga was born in Baringo District, Kenya.

His younger brother, Samuel Chelanga, is also a long-distance runner who won the NCAA Men's Cross Country Championship in 2009 and 2010.

== Achievements ==
Year	Competition	Venue	Position	Notes
1997	World Cross Country Championships	Turin, Italy	17th	Long race
1997	World Cross Country Championships	Turin, Italy	1st	Team
1999	World Cross Country Championships	Belfast, Northern Ireland	4th	Long race
1999	World Cross Country Championships	Belfast, Northern Ireland	1st	Team
2001	Boston Marathon	Boston, United States	3rd	Marathon
2002	Commonwealth Games	Manchester, England	2nd	Marathon

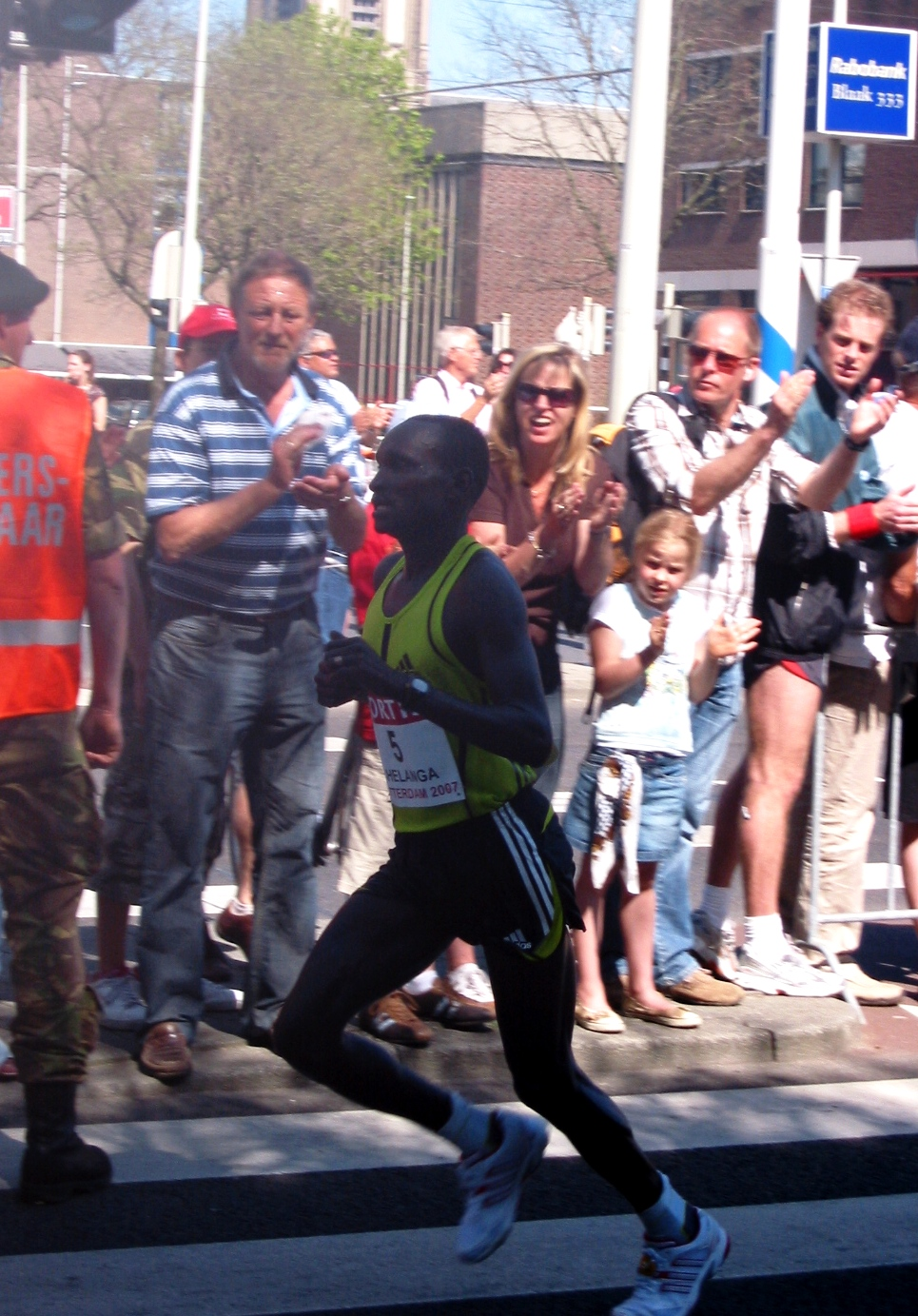
Joshua Chelanga during the Rotterdam Marathon in 2007

=== Marathons ===
- 2001 – Boston Marathon – 3rd
- 2002 – Commonwealth Games – 2nd
- 2004 – Berlin Marathon – 3rd (time 2:07:05, personal best)
- 2005 – Seoul International Marathon – 8th
- 2005 – Berlin Marathon – 4th
- 2006 – Paris Marathon – 26th
- 2006 – Eindhoven Marathon – 12th
- 2007 – Rotterdam Marathon – 1st
- 2007 – JoongAng Seoul Marathon – 1st
- 2009 – Rotterdam Marathon – 14th
