= Samukeliso Moyo =

Zimbabwean long-distance runner

Medal record

Women's athletics

Representing Zimbabwe

Commonwealth Games
Bronze medal – third place	1998 Kuala Lumpur	5000 m

Samukeliso Moyo (born 1 January 1974 in Gwanda) is a Zimbabwean long-distance runner. She represented her country at the 2000 Summer Olympics in Sydney, Australia, and the 1999 World Championships in Seville, Spain.

== Biography ==
She claimed the bronze medal in the women's 5000 metres at the 1998 Commonwealth Games. She represented Zimbabwe at the IAAF World Cross Country Championships on a number of occasions, with her best finishes being tenth in the short race at the 1998 edition and fifteenth in the 1999 long race. She has won titles at the African Southern Regional Championships, including wins over 1500 metres, 5000 m and in cross country.

Moyo began focusing on road running competitions and won back-to-back titles at the São Silvestre de Luanda 15K race in Angola from 1997 to 1998. She won the Rand Athletic Club 10 km race in 2001, taking the title in a time of 34:24. She set a personal best in the marathon at the 2008 Pyongyang Marathon, where she finished with a time of 2:37:17. She won both the Johannesburg City Marathon and the Cape Town City Marathons that year, beating the competition by a large margin on both occasions. At the Soweto Marathon near the end of the year, she was runner-up to the defending champion Mamorallo Tjoka of Lesotho.

She won at the South Africa Marathon Championships in 2009 and returned to defend her title the following year. She succeeded in winning for a second time, but the victory was a somewhat hollow one for the athlete: "I did not really enjoy the race because the level of competition was low ... Last year I had to work much harder to win. It was more like a training run this time". Moyo's comparatively slow winning time of 2:48:56 was still eleven minutes ahead of the rest of the women's field. She will be taking part in the 2010 Nedbank Soweto Marathon on 7 November.
