= Leah Malot =

Kenyan long-distance runner

Medal record

Women's athletics

Representing Kenya

Women's athletics

Representing Kenya

World Cross Country Championships
Gold medal – first place	1998 Marrakesh	Team long race
Gold medal – first place	2001 Ostend	Team long race
Silver medal – second place	1999 Belfast	Team long race
Silver medal – second place	2000 Vilamoura	Team long race
Bronze medal – third place	2002 Dublin	Team long race

African Championships
Silver medal – second place	2002 Radès	10,000 m

All-Africa Games
Gold medal – first place	1987 Nairobi	10,000 m
Bronze medal – third place	1999 Johannesburg	10,000 m
Bronze medal – third place	2003 Abuja	10,000 m

Leah Malot (born 6 July 1972) is a runner from Kenya. She is known for her long career. She started her international career by winning a gold medal at the 1987 All-Africa Games, aged only 15. A decade later she was a constant competitor at the IAAF World Cross Country Championships.

Malot competed at the 1987 World Championships, but did not qualify past the 10000 metres heats. At the 1999 World Championships she failed to finish the 10000 metres race. She won 5000 metres at the 2000 ISTAF meeting of IAAF Golden League meeting in Berlin, timing 14 minutes, 39.83 seconds, a new African record. The previous African record, 14:40.19, was set by Zahra Ouaziz of Morocco in 1998, while the previous Kenyan record, 14:46.41, had been held by Rose Cheruiyot since 1996. However, Malot failed to qualify for the 2000 Summer Olympics at the Kenyan trials. Malot won 3000 metres at the 2002 IAAF Super Grand Prix event in Qatar. She won Kenyan trials for the 2003 World Championships, but was eventually left off the Paris-bound roster after missing the event's official qualifying time threshold. The same year she won IAAF Grand Prix 5000 metres at the Osaka meeting

She won the 1998 Dam tot Damloop race in the Netherlands. and 2003 Philadelphia Distance Run. At the Lisbon Half Marathon, she finished second in 2003 and 2004. She used to hold the 3000 metres African indoor record.

On the cross country circuit, she won twice consecutively at the Oeiras International Cross Country meeting and narrowly missed out on a third win in 2003, finishing second but with the same time as Merima Denboba.

Malot is still active as of 2009. She finished 6th at the 2008 Frankfurt Marathon, 5th at the 2009 Lisbon Half Marathon, 7th at the 2009 Paris Marathon, 6th at the 2009 Berlin Marathon and 5th at the 2009 Singapore Marathon.

== Achievements ==
Year	Competition	Venue	Position	Event	Notes
Representing Kenya
1987	All-Africa Games	Nairobi, Kenya	1st	10,000 m	33:58.15
1998	World Cross Country Championships	Marrakesh, Morocco	8th	Long race	
1998	World Cross Country Championships	Marrakesh, Morocco	1st	Team	
1998	World Half Marathon Championships	Zurich, Switzerland	10th	Half marathon	
1999	World Cross Country Championships	Belfast, United Kingdom	9th	Long race	
1999	World Cross Country Championships	Belfast, United Kingdom	2nd	Team	
1999	All-Africa Games	Johannesburg, South Africa	3rd	10,000 m	
1999	IAAF Grand Prix Final	Munich, Germany	6th	3000 m	
2000	World Cross Country Championships	Vilamoura, Portugal	6th	Long race	
2000	World Cross Country Championships	Vilamoura, Portugal	2nd	Team	
2000	IAAF Grand Prix Final	Doha, Qatar	2nd	3000 m	
2001	World Cross Country Championships	Ostend, Belgium	6th	Long race	
2001	World Cross Country Championships	Ostend, Belgium	1st	Team	
2001	IAAF Grand Prix Final	Melbourne, Australia	2nd	3000 m	
2002	World Cross Country Championships	Dublin, Ireland	11th	Long race	
2002	World Cross Country Championships	Dublin, Ireland	3rd	Team	
2002	African Championships	Radès, Tunisia	2nd	10,000 m	
2002	IAAF Grand Prix Final	Paris, France	6th	3000 m	
2003	All-Africa Games	Abuja, Nigeria	3rd	10,000 m	
