= Patrick Ivuti =

Kenyan long-distance runner

Patrick Mutuku Ivuti
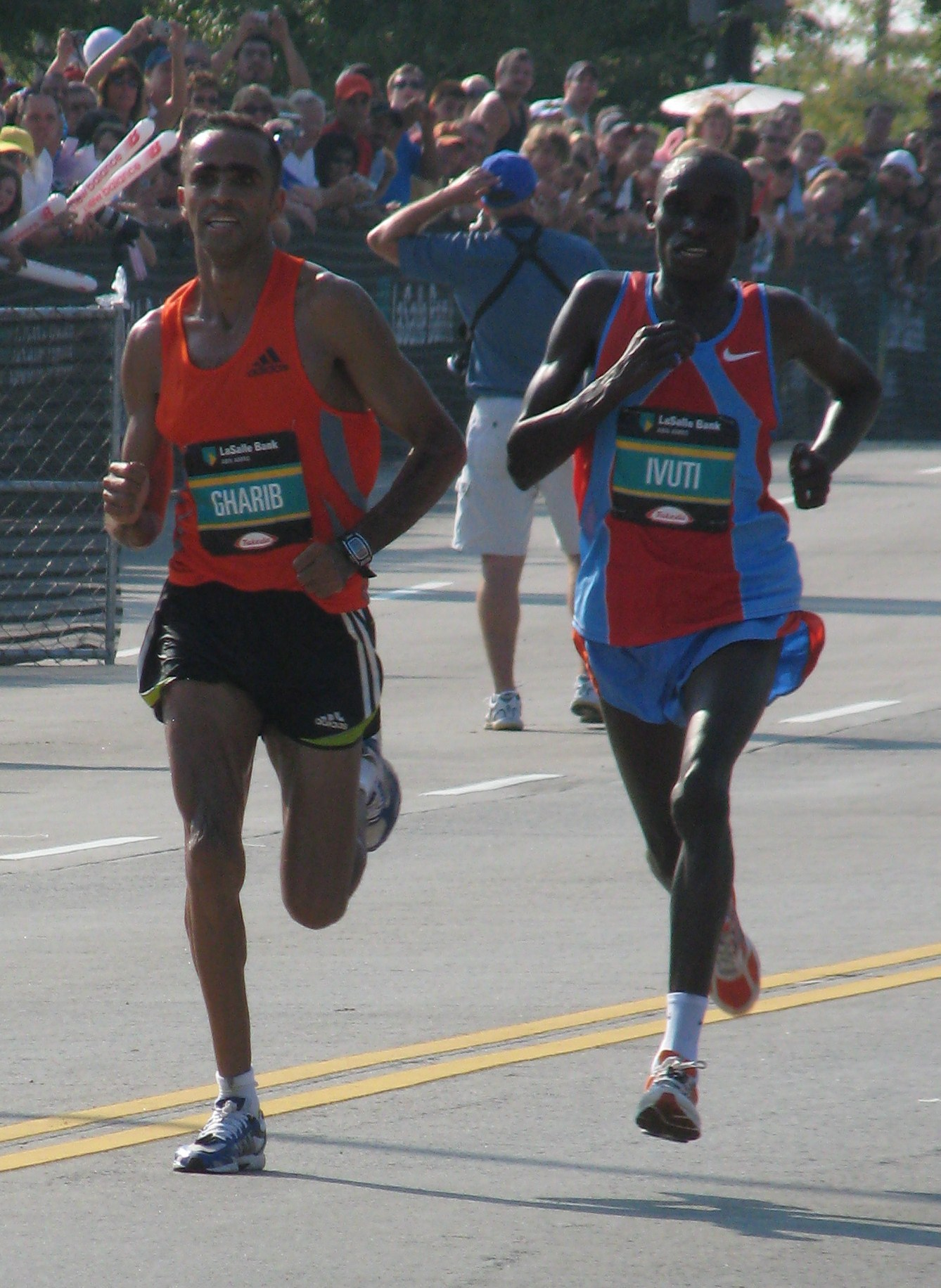
- The final 200 meters of the 2007 Chicago Marathon was a shoulder to shoulder race between Ivuti (right) Jaouad Gharib (left)

Personal information
- Full name: Patrick Mutuku Ivuti
- Born: 30 June 1978 (age 48) Tala, Machakos, Kenya

Sport
- Sport: Athletics
- Event(s): Long-distance running, Marathon, Cross country
- Club: Rosa & Associati

Achievements and titles
- Personal best(s): Half marathon: 59:27 (2007); Marathon: 2:07:48 (2009)
Medal record
Men's athletics
Representing Kenya
World Cross Country Championships
Silver medal – second place	1999 Belfast	Senior race
Silver medal – second place	2003 Lausanne	Senior race
Marathons
Gold medal – first place	2007 Chicago	Marathon
Gold medal – first place	2008 Honolulu	Marathon
Gold medal – first place	2009 Prague	Marathon
Gold medal – first place	2009 Honolulu	Marathon
Silver medal – second place	2011 Vienna	Marathon
Silver medal – second place	2011 Honolulu	Marathon

Patrick Mukutu Ivuti (born June 30, 1978) is a Kenyan long distance athlete, who currently resides in Nairobi, Kenya. A two-time silver medallist at the IAAF World Cross Country Championships, he made his marathon debut in 2005 and had his first major victory at the Chicago Marathon in 2007. He had back-to-back wins at the Honolulu Marathon in 2008–2009 and was the 2009 winner of the Prague Marathon.

== Biography ==
Ivuti has competed several times at the IAAF World Cross Country Championships, finishing second in 1999 behind Paul Tergat and runner-up again in 2003 when the race was won by Kenenisa Bekele. He also won the IAAF's Belfast International Cross Country meeting in 2000. However, he was plagued by injuries during much of the early part of this decade. He also competed at the 2000 Summer Olympics and finished fourth in the 10,000 metres. He was a two-time winner of the Almond Blossom Cross Country during this period.

Ivuti made his debut over the marathon distance at the 2005 Chicago Marathon. He has broken the hour mark several times since running a time of 59:31 in Lisbon 2000. He set his new half marathon personal record of 59:27 at the Rotterdam Half Marathon on September 9, 2007. He won the Prague International Half Marathon with a course record 1:01 on March 24, 2007, in Prague, Czech Republic.

He won the Chicago Marathon held on October 7, 2007, with a time of 2:11:11 hours. The race was the closest Chicago Marathon ever and a photo finish culmination of a shoulder to shoulder final 300 meter stretch run with Jaouad Gharib down Columbus Drive on a day of record-setting 88 °F (31 °C) temperatures.

He could not defend Chicago marathon title in 2008 due to injury. In December 2008 Ivuti won the Honolulu Marathon. In May 2009 he won the Prague Marathon and set a new race record. He also repeated the Honolulu Marathon victory. He had a disappointing run in Prague in 2010, coming nineteenth, but he rebounded at the 2011 Vienna City Marathon by recording his third career sub-2:10 time to take second place behind John Kiprotich. He returned to Honolulu but was beaten to the title by Nicholas Chelimo by a margin of three seconds.

Ivuti is married and his wife Marietta is sister of Jimmy Muindi, also a Kenyan marathon runner.

== Achievements ==
Year	Competition	Venue	Position	Event	Notes
Representing Kenya
2007	Chicago Marathon	Chicago, United States	1st	Marathon	2:11:11
2008	Honolulu Marathon	Honolulu, Hawaii	1st	Marathon	2:14:35
2009	Prague Marathon	Prague, Czech Republic	1st	Marathon	2:07:48
2009	Honolulu Marathon	Honolulu, Hawaii	1st	Marathon	2:12:14
