= Mandy Giblin =

Australian runner

Mandy Giblin (born 27 June 1974) is an Australian middle-distance runner and cross country athlete who competed at a national and international level in the late 1990s. She was the winner of the Australian Open 1500m Championship in 1997 and represented Australia at the 1998 IAAF World Cup and the 1998 Commonwealth Games, and at the IAAF World Cross Country Championships in both 1998 and 1999.
