= Teresa Recio =

Spanish long-distance runner

Personal information
- Born: 7 July 1963 (age 63) Villares de la Reina, Spain

Sport
- Sport: Track and field

María Teresa Recio García (born 7 July 1963) is a retired Spanish long-distance runner who specialized in the 10,000 metres and cross-country running. She competed in the women's 10,000 metres at the 2000 Summer Olympics.

== Achievements ==
Year	Tournament	Venue	Result	Event	Extra
1998	European Championships	Budapest, Hungary	8th	5000 m	
1999	World Championships	Seville, Spain	8th	10,000 m	31:43.80 PB
2000	World Cross Country Championships	Vilamoura, Portugal	16th	Senior race	
2000	World Cross Country Championships	Vilamoura, Portugal	5th	Team	
2001	World Cross Country Championships	Ostend, Belgium	22nd	Senior race	
2001	World Cross Country Championships	Ostend, Belgium	7th	Team	
2001	World Championships	Edmonton, Canada	15th	5000 m	
2001	World Championships	Edmonton, Canada	15th	10,000 m	
2003	World Half Marathon Championships	Vilamoura, Portugal	25th	Half marathon	1:13:42 PB

=== Personal bests ===
- 1500 metres - 4:18.83 min (1996)
- 3000 metres - 9:00.72 min (1998)
- 5000 metres - 15:12.06 min (2000)
- 10,000 metres - 31:43.80 min (1999)
- Half marathon - 1:13:42 hrs (2003)
