= Blandine Bitzner-Ducret =

French athlete

Personal information
- Born: 1 December 1965 (age 60) Strasbourg, France
- Height: 165 cm (5 ft 5 in)
- Weight: 51 kg (112 lb)

Sport
- Country: France
- Sport: Athletics
- Event(s): 5000m, 10000m, 3000m, cross country

Blandine Bitzner-Ducret (born 1 December 1965) is a former French athlete who specialized in distance races and cross-country.

Blandine was born at Strasbourg in 1965. She distinguished herself at the 1999 IAAF World Cross Country Championships by winning the world team title in Belfast, along with Yamna Oubouhou-Belkacem, Fatima Maama-Yvelain and Céline Rajot. She also won the bronze medal for team cross country at the 2000 IAAF World Cross Country Championships, alongside Fatima Maama-Yvelain, Yamna Oubouhou-Belkacem and Rakiya Maraoui-Quétier.

At the European Cross Country Championships, Blandine Bitzner-Ducret won the silver team medal in 1995 and the bronze team medal in 1996. In track, she placed sixth in the 5000 metres during the 1998 European Athletics Championships in Budapest. She participated in the 1996 Summer Olympics in Atlanta, where she reached the semi-finals of the 1500 metres.

Nationally, she won the title of champion of France in the 1500m in 1993 and 1994, the 5000m in 1998, in cross-country in 1998 and 1999 (long race) and the 3000 metres indoors in 1996.

In 1994, she set a new France record for the 1500m of 4:04.72.
