= Natalie Harvey =

Australian long-distance runner

Personal information
- Full name: Natalie Anne Harvey
- Nationality: Australian
- Born: 19 January 1975 (age 51)

Sport
- Sport: Long-distance running
- Event: 5000 metres

Natalie Anne Harvey (born 19 January 1975) is an Australian former long-distance runner. She competed in the women's 5000 metres at the 1996 Summer Olympics.
