= Moses Zarak Khan =

Fijian middle-distance runner (born 1966)

Personal information
- Nationality: Fijian
- Born: 12 April 1966 (age 60)

Sport
- Sport: Middle-distance running
- Event: 1500 metres

Moses Zarak Khan (born 12 April 1966) is a Fijian middle-distance runner. He competed in the men's 1500 metres at the 1988 Summer Olympics.
