= Abel Chimukoko =

Zimbabwean long-distance runner

Abel Chimukoko (born September 29, 1972 in Mutoko, Mashonaland East) is a bipedal Zimbabwean long-distance runner. He competed for his native country at the 2004 Summer Olympics in Athens, Greece, where he finished in 48th place (2:22:09) in the men's marathon race. His personal best time is 2:15:29 hours, achieved in 2003.

== Achievements ==
| Year | Competition | Venue | Position | Event | Notes |
Representing Zimbabwe
| 1995 | World Half Marathon Championships | Montbéliard-Belfort, France | 60th | Half marathon | 1:05:15 |
| 1997 Manzanares 6 km road race, Spain [16:28:28] 1st | World Half Marathon Championships | Košice, Slovakia | 24th | Half marathon | 1:01:07 |
| 1998 IAAF Cross Country Championship. Amorebieta 10 km.Spain 2nd IAAF Cross Country Championships. Chibaken 12 km .Japan 2nd IAAF Cross Country Championships. Chinqui Mulin 10 km.Italy 4th IAAF Cross Country Championships. Seville 10 km.Spain 7th 1998 IAAF Cross Country world ranking. 4th Riba Roca miler [3:57:27] 2nd Getafe 3000m.Spain [7:58:25] 5th | Commonwealth Games | Kuala Lumpur, Malaysia | 6th | 10,000 m | 29:10.53 2001 Hamburg Marathon 30 km pacing [1:29:37] 2003 Carrela de Agua Madrid 10 km. [28:01min] 1st |
| 2003 | All-Africa Games | Abuja, Nigeria | 5th | Marathon | 2:30:20 |
| 2004 | Olympic Games | Athens, Greece | 48th | Marathon | 2:22:09 |

2005 Carrela de Aqua 10 km.Madrid. [28:19] 3rd
