= Helena Sampaio (runner) =

Portuguese long-distance runner (born 1973)

Helena Sampaio (born 9 October 1973 in Pedreira) is a Portuguese runner, who specialized in cross-country running.

== Achievements ==
Year	Tournament	Venue	Result	Event	Extra
Representing Portugal
1999	World Cross Country Championships	Belfast, Northern Ireland	8th	Long race	
1999	World Cross Country Championships	Belfast, Northern Ireland	3rd	Team	
2000	Berlin Marathon	Berlin, Germany	6th	Marathon	2:29:34
2002	World Cross Country Championships	Dublin, Ireland	20th	Short race	
2002	World Cross Country Championships	Dublin, Ireland	7th	Team	
2002	World Cross Country Championships	Dublin, Ireland	19th	Long race	
2002	World Cross Country Championships	Dublin, Ireland	6th	Team	
2003	Amsterdam Marathon	Amsterdam, Netherlands	1st	Marathon	2:28:06
2004	World Cross Country Championships	Brussels, Belgium	30th	Short race	
2004	World Cross Country Championships	Brussels, Belgium	6th	Team	
2004	World Cross Country Championships	Brussels, Belgium	21st	Long race	
2004	World Cross Country Championships	Brussels, Belgium	8th	Team	
2004	Olympic Games	Athens, Greece	47th	Marathon	2:49:18

=== Personal bests ===
- 10,000 metres - 31:43.22 min (1999)
- Half marathon - 1:10:15 hrs (2000)
- Marathon - 2:28:06 hrs (2003)
