= Hareg Sidelil =

Ethiopian middle-distance runner

Personal information
- Nationality: Ethiopian
- Born: 20 April 1981 (age 45)

Sport
- Sport: Middle-distance running
- Event: 1500 metres

Hareg Sidelil (born 20 April 1981) is an Ethiopian middle-distance runner. She competed in the women's 1500 metres at the 2000 Summer Olympics.
