= Hicham Bouaouiche =

Moroccan long-distance runner

Hicham Bouaouiche (born 16 June 1974) is a Moroccan retired long-distance runner who specialized in the 3000 metres steeplechase.

He finished eleventh at the 1996 Summer Olympics, fifth at the 1997 World Championships in Athletics, and eleventh in the Grand Prix Final the same year. His personal best time is 8:10.10 minutes, achieved in July 1998 in Nice.

At the 1998 IAAF World Cross Country Championships in Marrakesh, Bouaouiche finished ninth in the short race and won a silver medal with the Moroccan team. He was the silver medallist in the steeplechase at the 1997 Mediterranean Games.

Bouaouiche was sentenced to prison for the murder of French law enforcement officer Laurent Soler on 22 December 2000. Soler was shot and killed by Bouaouiche as Bouaouiche and accomplices were stealing computers from an insurance company in Pont-Saint-Esprit. Bouaouiche served 20 years. Five months after his release, he assaulted and robbed a taxi driver near Rabat. In December 2024, Moroccan courts sentenced him to five years in prison for raping his daughter.
