= Merima Hashim =

Ethiopian long-distance runner

Merima Hashim (born 1981 in Lekemj) is an Ethiopian long-distance runner who started competing internationally in the late 1990s mainly in the 10000 metres and half marathon distances.

In 1999 she won a silver medal for the 10000 metres in the All-Africa Games in Johannesburg, South Africa.
