= Buhayra =

Buhayra or Buhaira may refer to:

- Bahira, a monk who, according to Islamic tradition, foretold to Muhammad his future as a prophet
- Buhaira Gardens, a 12th-century garden and palace in Seville, Spain
