= Agdal Gardens =

Historical site in Marrakesh, Morocco

Coordinates: 31°36′22″N 7°58′47″W

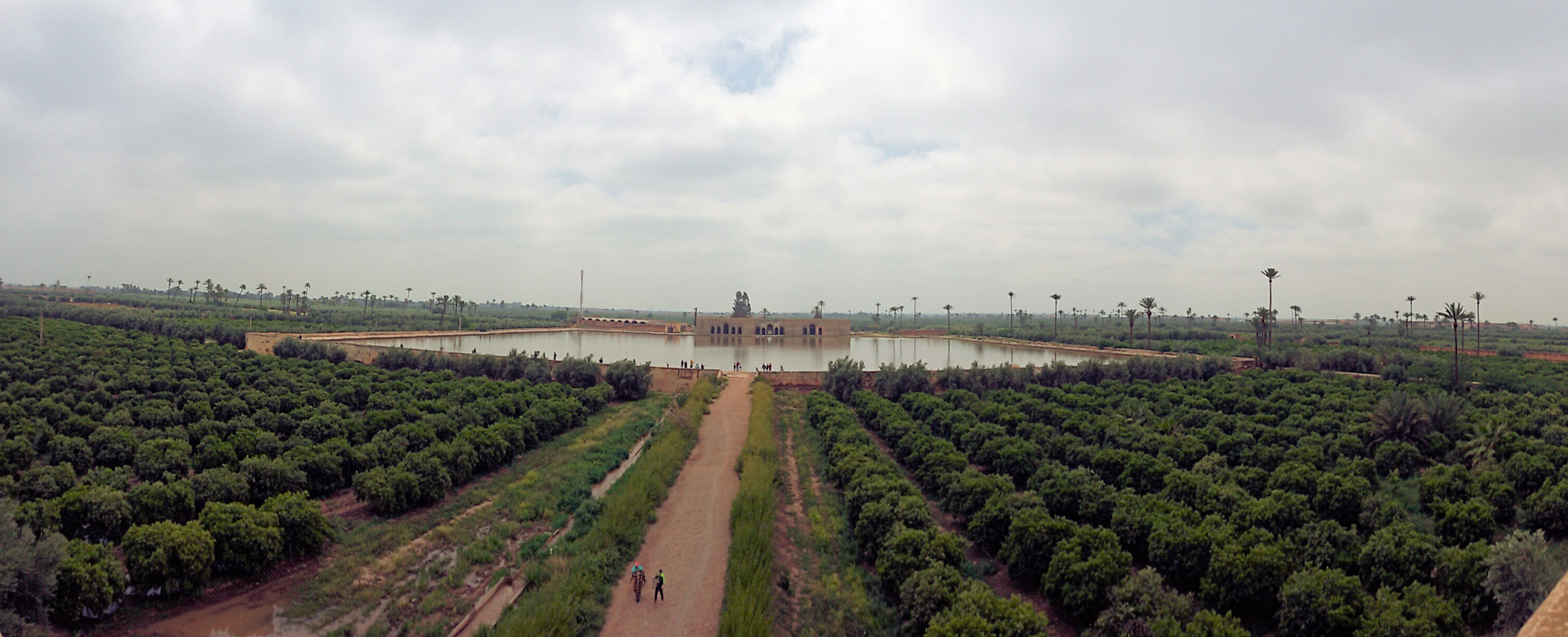
Panoramic view of the Agdal Gardens, looking towards the Dar al-Hana reservoir

The Agdal Gardens (or Aguedal Gardens) are a large area of historic gardens and orchards in Marrakesh, Morocco. The gardens are located to the south of the city's historic Kasbah and its royal palace. Together with the medina of Marrakech and the Menara Gardens, the Agdal Gardens were listed by UNESCO as a World Heritage Site in 1985. The gardens contain several historic water reservoirs as well as several historic palaces and pavilions, including the Dar el-Hana and the Dar al-Bayda.

== Etymology ==
The name Agdal is a polysemic term derived from Tamazight (Berber) meaning a "walled meadow" or a summer pasture for transhumance. The same name is also used for similar walled parks and gardens in other historic Moroccan cities such as Fez, Meknes, and Rabat.

== History ==
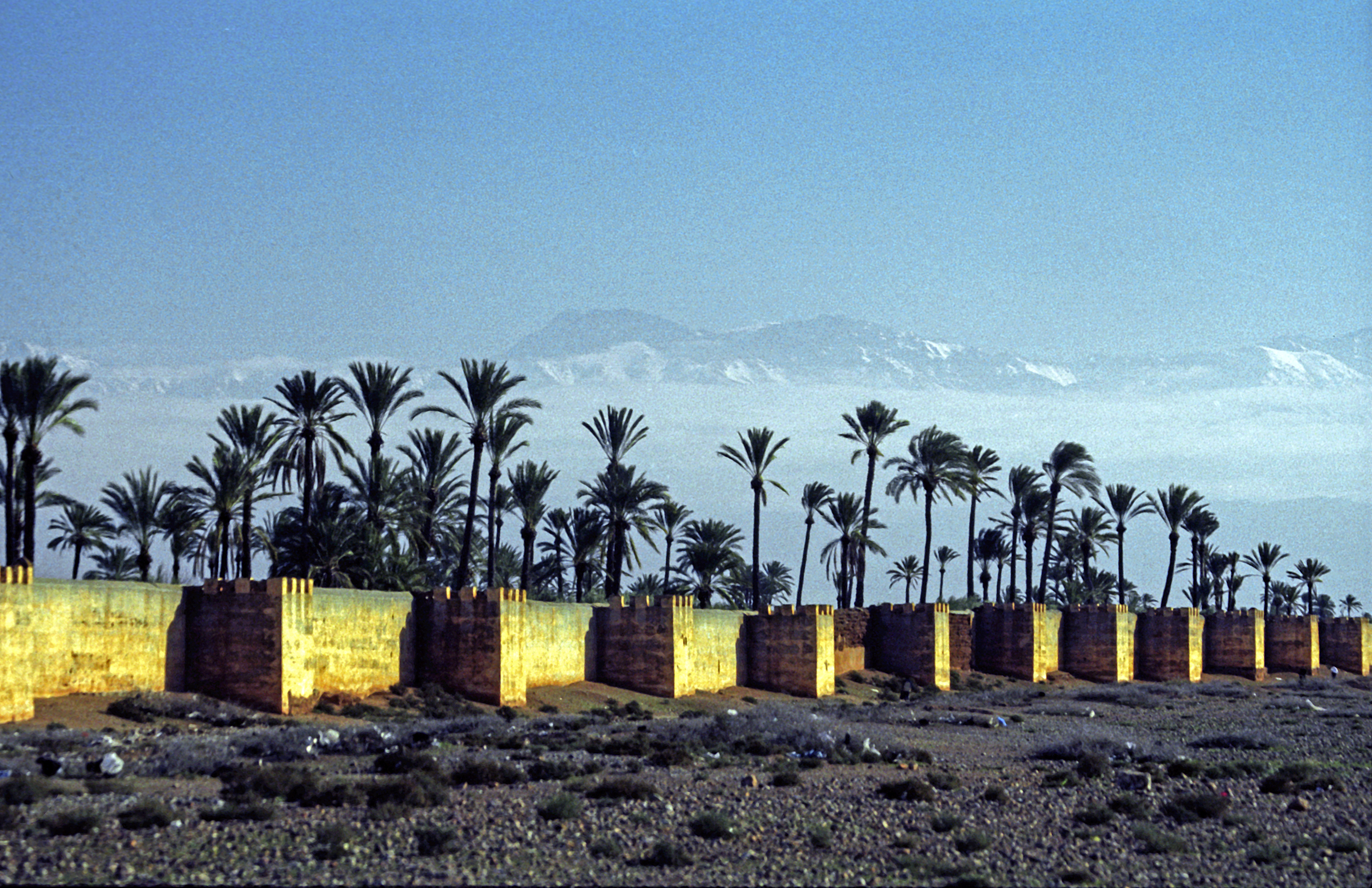
Wall around the gardens

=== Almohad creation ===
The tradition of creating gardens on the outskirts of the city began early with the Almoravids who founded Marrakesh in 1070. Multiple gardens, estates, and artificial lakes were established in multiple sites outside the city walls, often referred to as buḥā'ir – singular buḥayra – an Arabic word meaning "little sea", presumably in reference to the artificial lakes and large water basins. The site of the later Almohad Kasbah, for example, was already occupied by a garden orchard named Jnan as-Saliḥa.

The current Agdal Gardens, however, were first established by the Almohads. The largest reservoir of the gardens, known today as the Dar al-Hana reservoir, is believed to date from this original creation, during the reign of Abu Ya'qub Yusuf (ruled 1163–1184). Scholars differ on whether the other main reservoir, known as al-Gharsiyya, dates from the same time or from the Alaouite period. The gardens were designed by Ahmad ibn Muhammad ibn Milhan, an engineer from Al-Andalus and of Berber origin, who became rich thanks to the sultan's favour following his successful designs. The gardens were originally still known in this period as al-Buḥayra (this Arabic name was generalized and applied to other gardens too) or as al-Bustan (a word of Persian origin meaning "garden"). At the end of the 12th century, Abu Ya'qub Yusuf's successor, Ya'qub al-Mansur, built the Kasbah and the new royal palaces of his dynasty on the south side of the city. Its southern gate, Bab al-Bustan, was so named because it led to the gardens south of the city. A recent study by Spanish scholars uses topographical and archeological clues to argue that the Kasbah walls and the Agdal walls were not originally linked together as they are today and that an open space existed between them instead. Historian Gaston Deverdun also cites historical sources indicating that the walls were still not connected to the Kasbah during the later Saadian period. The Spanish study suggests that the original enclosure had a slightly irregular quadrilateral profile corresponding to the middle section of the current Agdal enclosure. This section is distinguishable today by a length of the western wall that runs in a direction not parallel with the eastern wall.

In this original enclosure the Dar al-Hana (as it is known today) would have been located adjacent to the southern wall of the gardens, slightly uphill from the rest of the gardens. The same Spanish study has argued that the overall layout of the Dar al-Hana complex, with the reservoir and its residential pavilion located on its middle axis to the south, dates back to the original Almohad design. The ensemble formed its own enclosed walled space within the larger gardens. It was arranged in a symmetrical plan that was aligned with the north-south axis of the gardens, which in turn was aligned with the royal Kasbah to the north. The main water channel which supplied the gardens also entered the reservoir from the south on this same axis, possibly passing through the residential palace. Of this original Almohad complex, only the enormous water basin itself has survived to the present day, thanks to its solidity, though it has been repaired many times.

=== Saadian renewal ===
For the rest of its history, the gardens went through a cycle of decline and renewal. When neglected, the gardens quickly ran dry and were prone to desertification. During periods of renewal, later rulers were required to replant the gardens and clear sediments from the reservoirs and channels. After the defeat of the Almohads in the 13th century Marrakesh ceased to be the capital and the gardens underwent a first period of decline. It was only under the Saadian dynasty in the 16th century that the capital returned to the city and the Kasbah, along with the gardens, were restored and redeveloped. During this period the gardens became known as Rawd al-Masarra ("Garden of Happiness"). The first restoration works, mainly aimed at rehabilitating the water supply system, were carried out by Sultan Abdallah al-Ghalib and further work was continued by Ahmad al-Mansur. Both of them also worked on rebuilding the city's kasbah to the north. Historical sources also mention that the Al-Masarra gardens were open to the public and to all of the city's citizens, a tradition which continues to the present day.

The pleasure palace of Dar al-Hana, built on the south side of the largest reservoir, is also clearly mentioned and described for the first time in historical sources for the Saadian period. According to these sources the palace was most likely completely rebuilt by Abdallah al-Ghalib and then again by Ahmad al-Mansur. The palace built by Al-Mansur, of which there are minor archeological remains, covered a large rectangular area and had two levels in some parts. Its floor plan was dominated by a central courtyard with a long rectangular pool along its north-south axis. At the center of this pool was a marble platform with a smaller square pool with leopard sculptures at its four corners and a column in its center topped with the sculpture of a lion from which water spurted like a fountain. Its monumental riad-like design was similar in some respects to the more famous El Badi Palace in the Kasbah, and it is named as one of Al-Mansur's great works in historical sources. Like the El Badi, it too was very opulent and it too was plundered afterwards by Sultan Moulay Isma'il. Ahmad al-Mansur also appears to have reinforced the water reservoir by encasing it with thicker outer walls, which also elevated the walkway along its edge.

=== Alaouite period ===
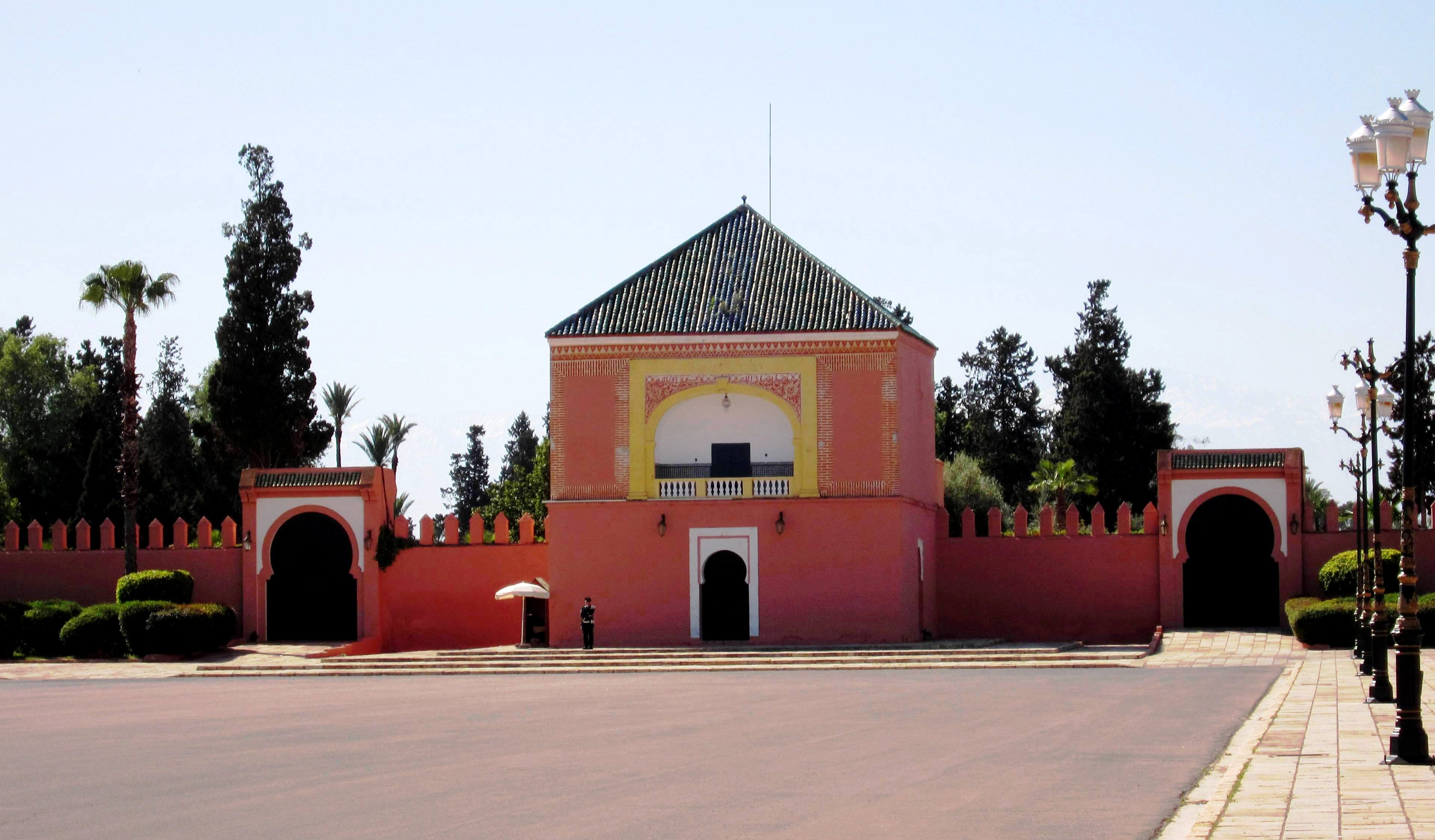
The Qubbat as-Suwayra ("Pavilion of Essaouira"), dating from Muhammad ibn Abdallah's reign (18th century), built at the northern edge of the Agdal Gardens and the southern edge of the Grand Mechouar of the Royal Palace

The gardens underwent another period of relative decline after the fall of the Saadians but were still partially maintained and used as a recreational space for the early Alaouite sultans (17th-18th centuries) Some initial restoration was carried out by Muhammad ibn Abdallah (viceroy in Marrakesh after 1747, sultan from 1757 to 1790). Muhammad ibn Abdallah was responsible for rebuilding the royal palace in the Kasbah and extending it southwards, bringing it closer to the Agdal. The Qubbat as-Suwayra ("Pavilion of Essaouira"), which stands today at the southern edge of the Grand Mechouar and at the northern edge of the Agdal, dates from this time. A recent study by Spanish scholars suggests that it was in this period that the Agdal was in turn extended northward and its walls were joined with the walls of the Kasbah, as they are today. The Dar al-Bayda palace, which is located in this northern extension of the gardens, was also first built by Muhammad ibn Abdallah.

It was Sultan Abd ar-Rahman (ruled 1822–1859), however, who finally began replanting and restoring the gardens in full in the 19th century. The work was finished by his successor, Muhammad IV (ruled 1859–1873). It was also in the 19th century that the name Agdal began to be used for the gardens as well as for similar orchard areas in other cities. To rehabilitate the water supply system Abd ar-Rahman had to negotiate with local Berber tribes near the mountains to return control of old water sources to the central government. The works also required clearing the silt which had built up in the abandoned reservoirs and even required clearing a village which had come to occupy the Dar al-Hana reservoir. The replanting of trees took many years, starting at the northern end and progressing southwards. The presence or remains of other internal walls within the Agdal today may correspond to the different phases of restoration and expansion during this period.

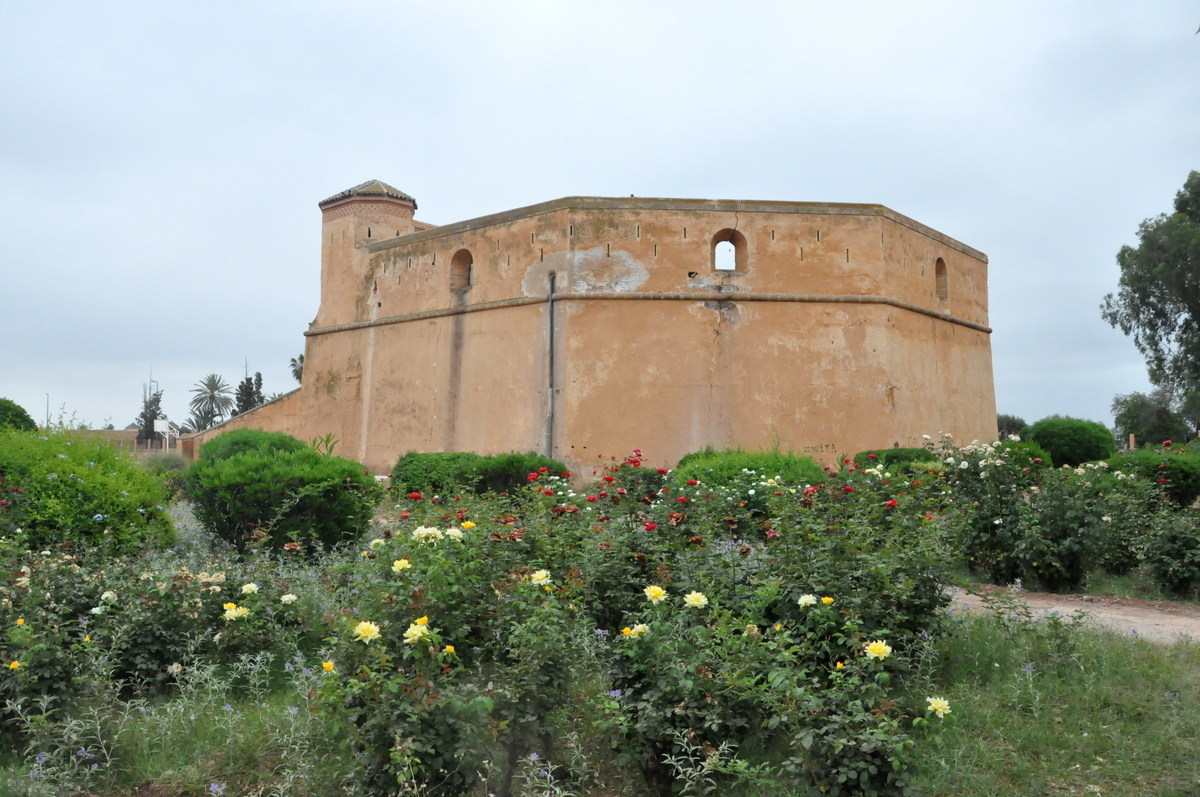
The Sqallat al-Mrabit, a 19th-century fort built by Sultan Muhammad ibn Abd al-Rahman to protect the western flank of the Agdal

Muhammad IV, for his part, extended the Agdal enclosure further south, creating the Agdal Barrani section which extends south of the Dar al-Hana, thus finalizing the Agdal's present-day outline. The outer western walls of the Agdal were also partly rebuilt in his time following an attack by the Rehamna tribe, whom the sultan afterwards ordered to repair the damage. At the same time, a small bastion fort was added here on the Agdal's western perimeter, known as the Sqallat al-Mrabit, to help defend it in the future. In 1862-63 Muhammad also built a new pleasure kiosk in the middle of the Jnan ar-Redwan, the garden area in the northwestern corner of the enclosure.

The Dar al-Bayda palace, which was begun earlier, was expanded and completed in its current form by Sultan Moulay Hassan (ruled 1873–1894) after 1883. Moulay Hassan, who took interest in introducing new modern technologies in his kingdom, also added several industrial buildings within the garden estates. The current Dar al-Hana palace pavilion was also rebuilt at some point in the mid-19th century, on a smaller scale than the earlier palace of Ahmad al-Mansur. Early 20th-century sources report that it was left unfinished, however, and the structure soon fell into ruins again. It was rebuilt, redesigned, and partly expanded by French architect André Paccard (who worked for King Hassan II) in the 1970s or 1980s, which resulted in the current structure standing on this site.

== Description ==
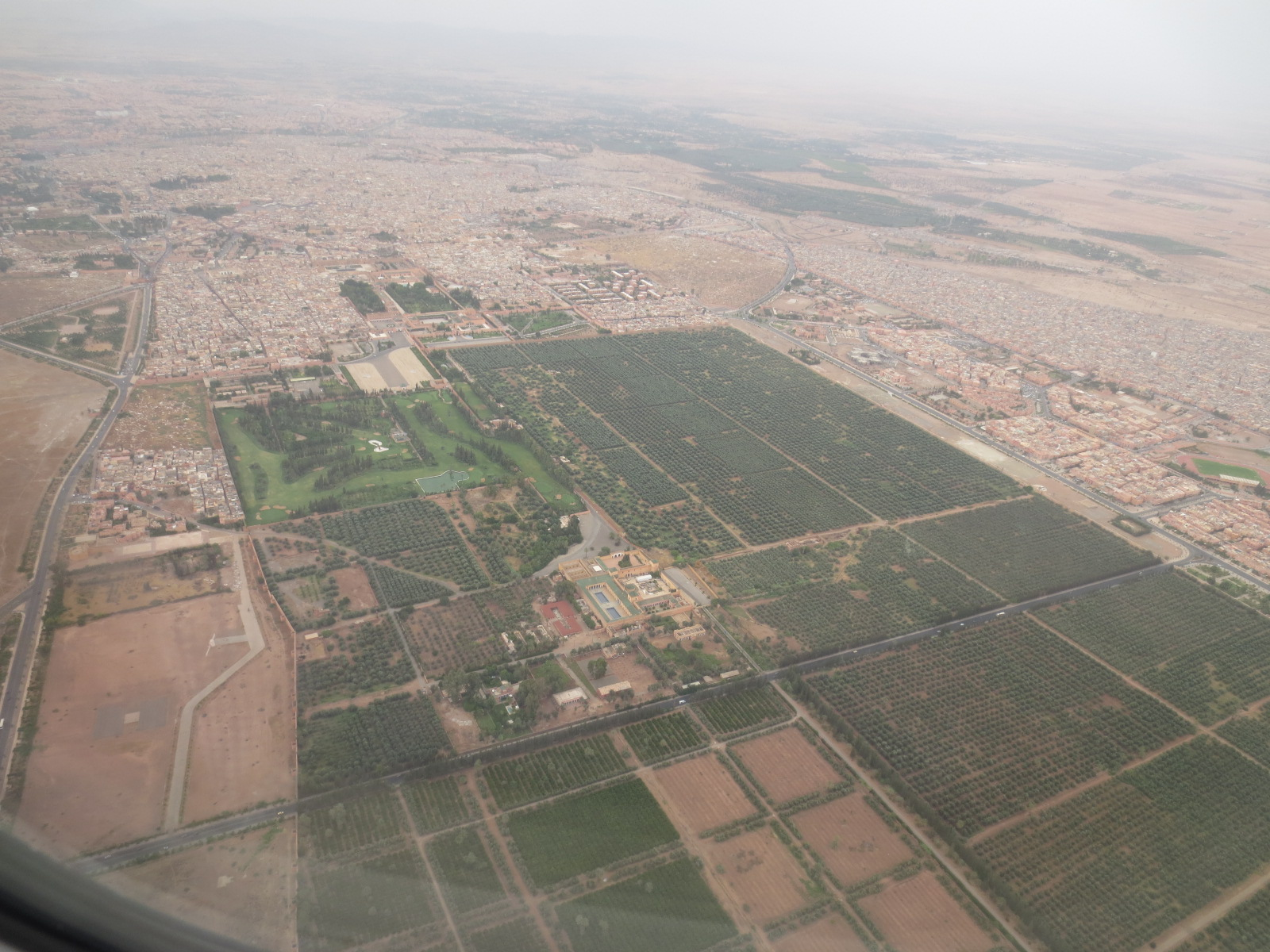
Aerial view of the gardens (the Dar al-Bayda is visible in the center)

=== Geography ===
The gardens cover 340 hectares (3.4 km^{2}; 1.3 sq mi) and extend for some 3 kilometres (1.9 mi), surrounded by a 9-kilometre (5.6 mi) long wall. Its location to the south of the city, on a gentle uphill slope leading to the mountains, allowed it to take advantage of the waters coming directly into the city as well as to help protect the water supply of the city by enclosing them within the Agdal's walls. The otherwise flat landscape allowed for easy planting and a regular layout of plots.

=== Botany ===
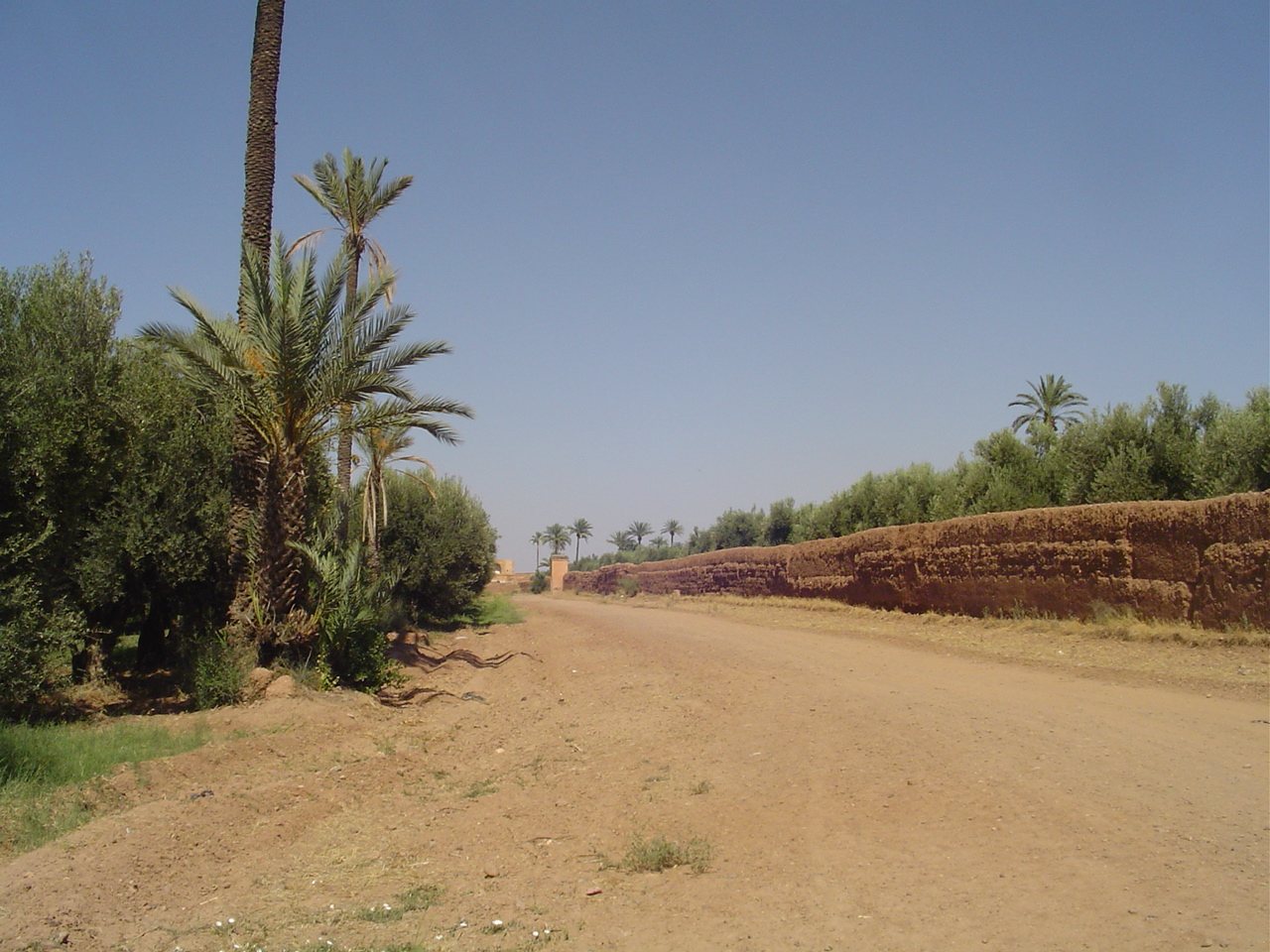
Orchards and remains of walls inside the gardens

Royal Moroccan gardens like the Agdal were designed with a primarily productive agricultural purpose. While there have not been many comprehensive archeological investigations of the Agdal, historical texts provide some information about what was planted here and in other gardens like the Menara. They indicate from its beginning the Agdal was planted with similar types of trees and crops, mostly fruit and olive trees. It was around the time of Almohads that the lemon tree and orange tree first arrived in Morocco from Asia. Vines were also planted and wine was historically consumed at some royal festivities despite its taboo, although the production of wine in the region was concentrated further south along the Neffis River. Over the following centuries various crops are reported to have been grown in the gardens. In addition to olives (the most common crop), lemons, oranges, and vines, other crops included: pomegranate, elderberry, myrtle, roses, jasmine, apricot, and peaches. A census of the gardens in 1916, during the French colonial administration, counted 29,227 olive trees, 9851 orange trees, and 11,717 other fruit trees including pomegranate trees, for a total of 50,795 trees. This count is essentially representative of the current gardens. Crops and trees are planted in different areas according to their water needs.

=== Irrigation System ===
The water to the gardens was historically provided by a network of underground channels and ditches known as khettara, which bring water down from the High Atlas mountains many kilometres away, especially from the Ourika River basin to the south. Water was also diverted from rivers by building dams and surface channels. The enormous water basins inside the garden served as reservoirs from which water could be redistributed to the surrounding area via a network of ditches. The reservoirs also accumulated water so that a supply could be guaranteed year-round, including during the winter. The largest reservoir, the reservoir of the Dar al-Hana, has a regular rectangular form measuring 208 by 181 meters, with a capacity of 83,000 cubic meters. It is built with rammed earth mixed with lime and gravel. The second-largest reservoir, al-Gharsiyya, has a slightly more irregular quadrilateral shape and features a square island at its center.

In modern times, however, as the city's water needs grew, a modern khettara with far greater output flow was dug in 1932-33 to water the Agdal. Nonetheless, even this new khettara wasn't enough and much of the water was still needed for the growing city, and so in the 20th century water for the gardens and the city began to be drawn directly from the phreatic table in the city's area.

=== Palace structures ===
==== Dar al-Hana ====
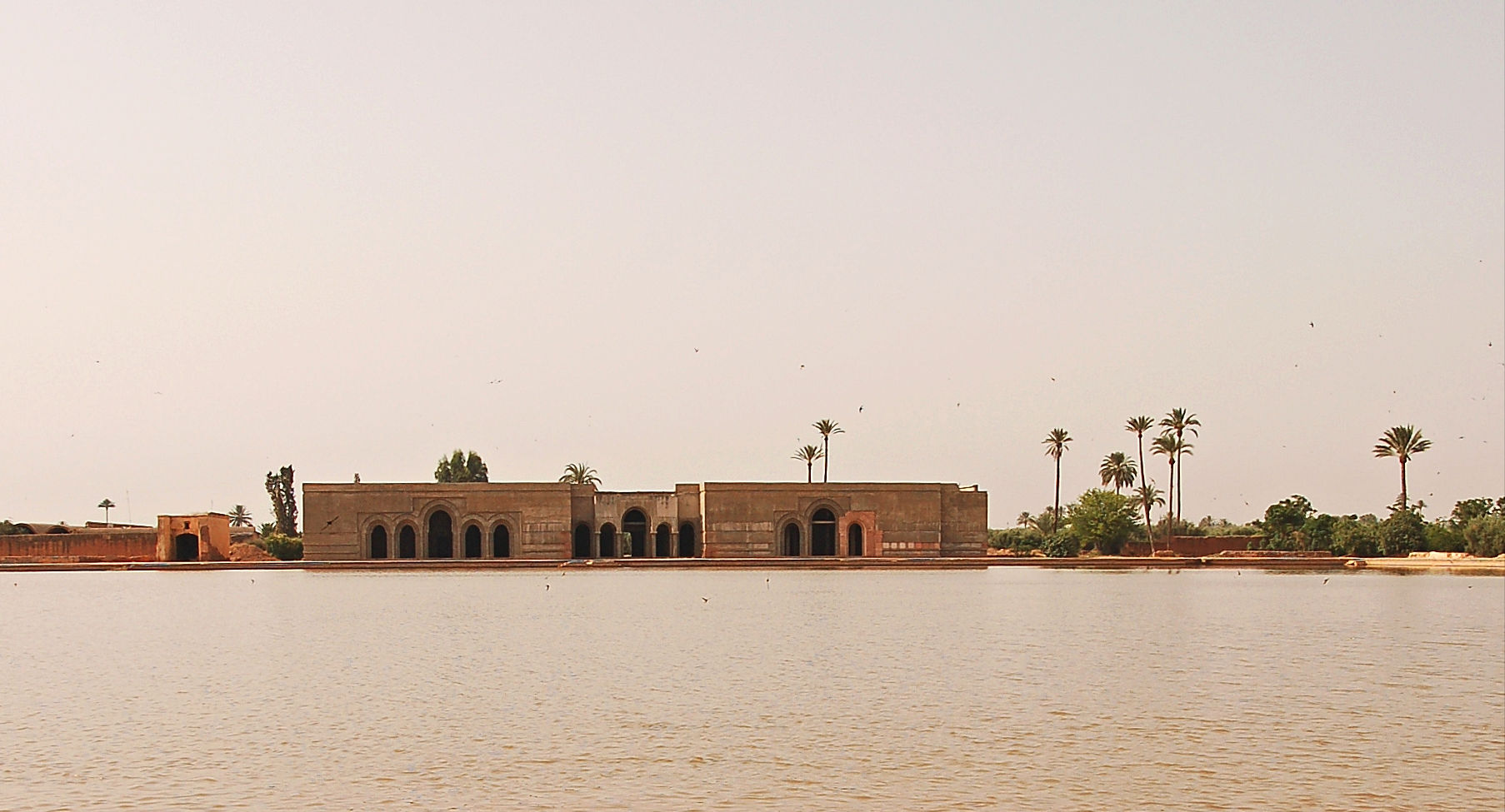
The Dar El Hana pavilion at the edge of the grand reservoir. The palace building on this location has been rebuilt many times over centuries; the current structure is a partly unfinished concrete structure built in the 1980s

The Dar al-Hana, a palatial pavilion, stands on the southern side of the largest and oldest reservoir of the Agdal. The pavilion and the reservoir were surrounded by their own rectangular wall enclosure, with a main gate to the north which was aligned with the main north-south axis of the gardens leading from the Kasbah of the city. The north gate is integrated into an observation pavilion (menzeh) that rises above it. In addition to the residential palace pavilion, there are several other historical structures nearby which were part of the ensemble. Right next to the pavilion, on its east side, is a boathouse which was connected with the reservoir. The sultan's stables were housed in a structure a short distance to the southwest of this, which consists of nine long vaulted halls subdivided by rows of arches. On the east edge of the reservoir are the remains of a much smaller pavilion dating to the Saadian period, which probably once faced a similar pavilion on the west side of the reservoir. At the northwestern corner of the enclosure is a warehouse which once stored munitions, while just east of this are the remains of an animal-powered mill.

The residential pavilion itself is likely built on the site of the former Saadian palace of Ahmad al-Mansur, with some minor remains of the latter being integrated into the present-day building. After Al-Mansur, the palace was rebuilt in the 19th century by the Alaouites, but on a much smaller scale. Whereas the Saadian palace had a large rectangular floor plan extending south beyond the perimeter of the wall enclosure surrounding the reservoir, the 19th-century palace retained only the northern end of this palace, forming a small rectangular building which was meant to have two floors but whose second floor was never completed. It fell into ruin in turn during the 20th century, until in the 1970s or 1980s King Hassan II had a French architect, André Paccard, rebuild the pavilion. The 20th-century structure, which still stands today, erased most of the former structure but retained some of its floor plan and expanded it northwards, closer to the edge of the pool. The new structure, built in concrete, was also taller, raising the height of the walls but preserving some traces of an earlier crenellated wall which might date back as far as the palace built by Abdallah al-Ghalib in the 16th century. Even Paccard's building was also left unfinished, however.

Sultan Mohammed IV died in the reservoir when his steamboat capsized there in 1873.

==== Dar al-Bayda ====
Dar al-Bayda, the principal palace inside the gardens, comprises a complex of structures within its own wall enclosure. The main 18th-century palace structure, which was later expanded by Moulay Hassan in the late 19th century, consists of three courtyards arranged from north to south, each with a different layout. The northern and southern courtyards have rectangular forms. The northern one originally had a square water basin at its center while the southern had a central star-shaped fountain. The larger central courtyard between them has a square layout. It was originally had a central water basin as well, but its most distinctive features are the two square pavilion towers rising from its western corners, each topped by a green-tiled pyramidal roof, and a large eight-sided kiosk in the middle between them. This kiosk, the Qubbat al-Ghana'im ("Dome of the Spoils"), rises to an eight-sided pointed cupola, and is surrounded at ground level by an enveloping portico or gallery. In the 20th century the whole palace was converted into use as a military hospital. At some point a large rectangular courtyard was added to the western side of the palace as well, and more rooms and structures were variously added later in the 20th century.

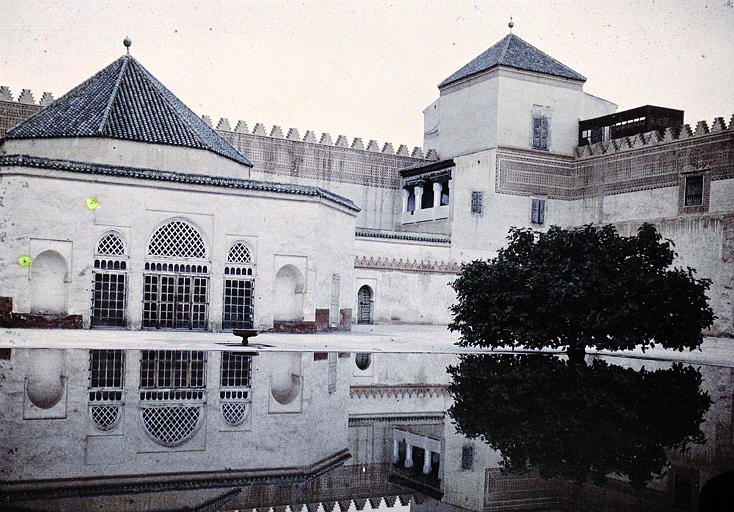
The old central courtyard of the Dar al-Bayda palace; on the left is the octagonal pavilion and on the right is one of the corner towers (1924 photo)

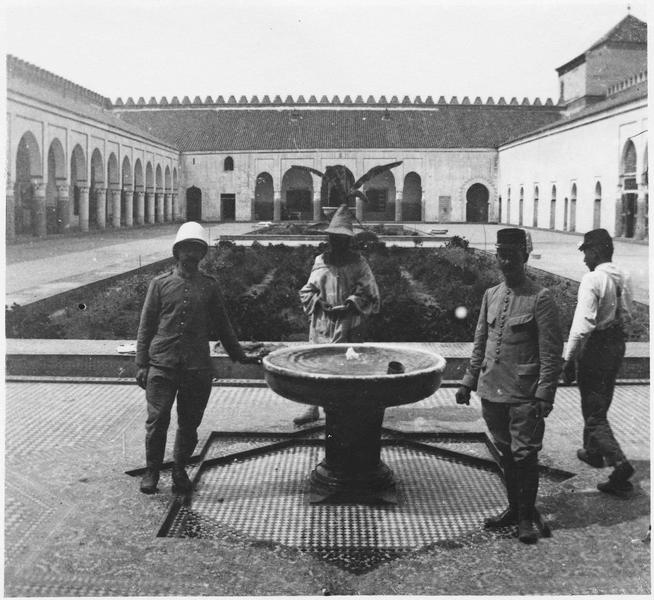
The newer western courtyard of the palace (1916 photo)

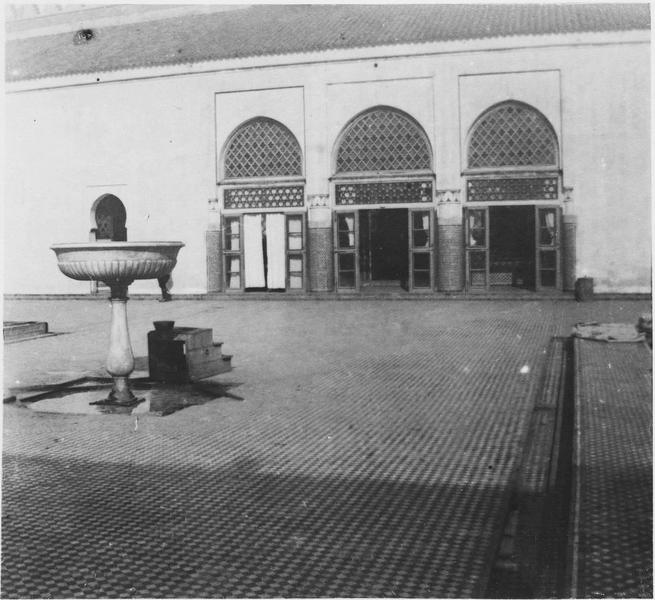
The newer western courtyard (1916 photo)

== See also ==
- Landmarks of Marrakesh
- Buhaira Gardens
- Mosara Garden
- Generalife
- Kasbah of Moulay Ismail
- Majorelle Garden
