= Menara Gardens =

Public garden in Marrakesh, Morocco

Coordinates: 31°36′48″N 8°01′18″W

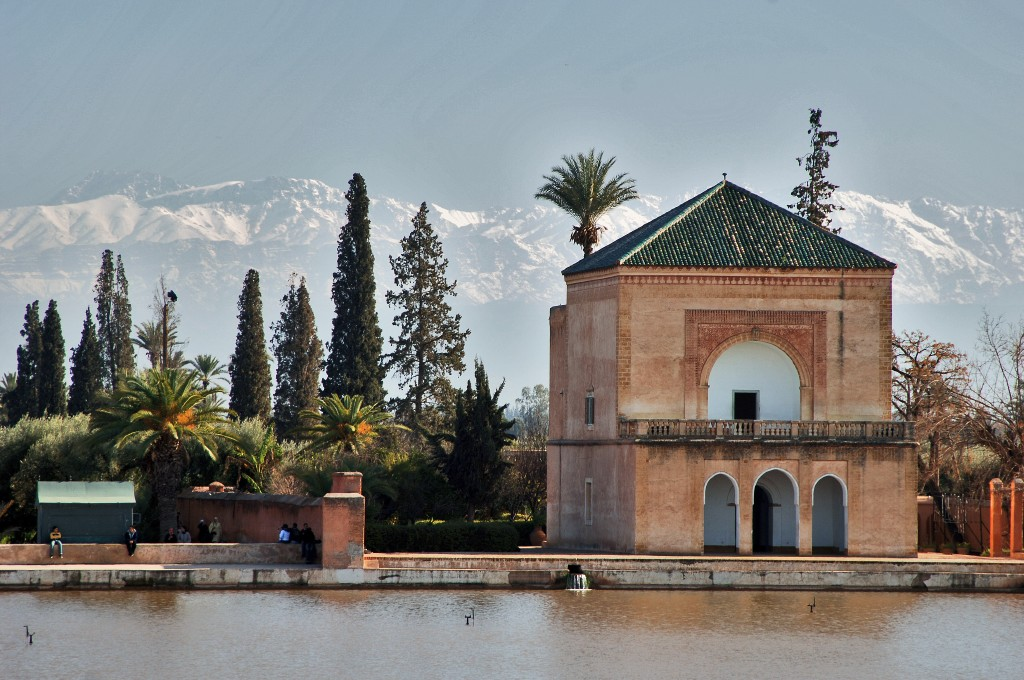
- Water reservoir and pavilion of the Menara
- Interactive map of Menara Gardens
- Location: Marrakesh, Morocco
- Type: historic garden/orchard
- Beginning date: 1157 CE

The Menara Gardens (Arabic: حدائق المنارة) are a historic public garden and orchard in Marrakesh, Morocco. They were established in the 12th century (circa 1157) by the Almohad Caliphate ruler Abd al-Mu'min. Along with the Agdal Gardens and the historic walled city of Marrakesh, the gardens have been listed as UNESCO World Heritage Site since 1985. The gardens are laid out around a central water basin and reservoir, next to which is a pleasure pavilion dating in its current form from the 19th century. The reservoir and its pavilion, often framed in pictures against the background of the High Atlas Mountains to the south, are considered one of the iconic views and symbols of Marrakesh.

== Etymology ==
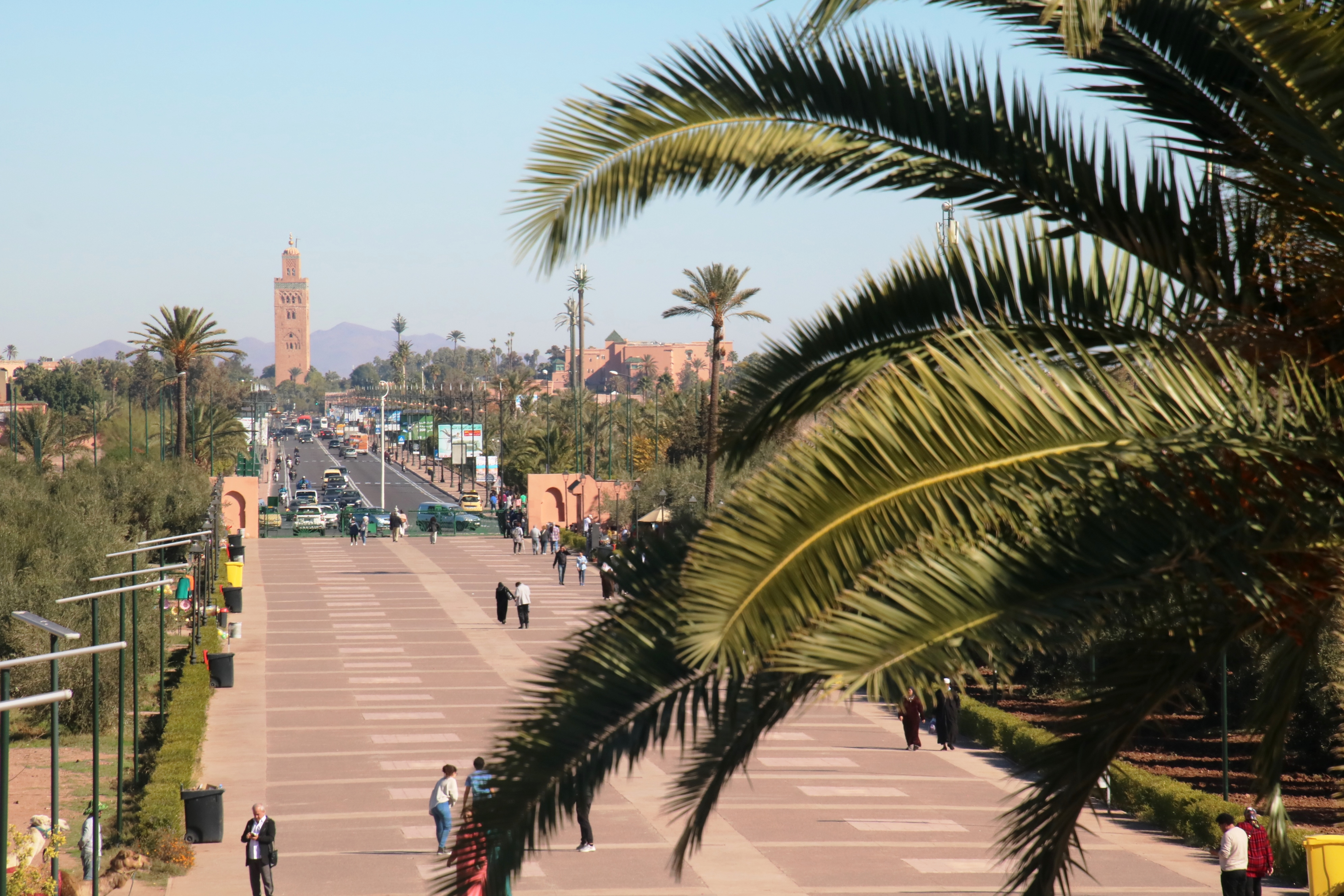
View from the Menara Gardens towards the Kutubiyya minaret to the east; the minaret has been suggested as one possible origin of the garden's name, Menara

The origin of the name Menara for the gardens is not firmly established. The name's first appearance (as Sahrij al-Manāra) in historical sources is in 1579, during the Saadian period. The Arabic word menara (منارَة) variously means "minaret", "lighthouse", "lantern/beacon" or other elevated structures of the kind. It is often suggested that this refers to the two-story pavilion standing on the edge of the main reservoir. However, other historians, such as Gaston Deverdun, have suggested that the name could date from as far back as the Almohad period (long before the current pavilion's construction) and that it may be an allusion to the minaret of the Kutubiyya Mosque to the northeast, which was founded and begun under Abd al-Mu'min's reign and with which the gardens were more or less aligned.

== History ==
The tradition of creating gardens on the outskirts of the city began early with the Almoravids who founded Marrakesh in 1070. Multiple gardens, estates, and artificial lakes were established in multiple sites outside the city walls, often referred to as buḥā'ir – singular buḥayra– an Arabic word meaning "little sea", presumably in reference to the artificial lakes and large water basins. These garden estates continued to exist and develop under the Almohads who conquered the city in the 12th century.

The Menara Gardens were first established by Abd al-Mu'min, the Almohad ruler who conquered the city, in 1157. This dating has been deduced by scholars from historical chronicles describing Abd al-Mu'min's construction of an enormous garden estate west of the city which contained two large water reservoirs. One of these reservoirs is the current one seen at the gardens today (although it was probably slightly modified in later restorations). The second reservoir in question is believed to be the Sahrij al-Bgar (or Sahrij al-Baqar), located outside and southeast of the Menara Gardens today, a short distance west of Bab Ighli and the Agdal Gardens. Its name, meaning "basin of the cows", may be a reference to either a nearby cattle market at the time or to the raising of bulls for bullfighting which took place here under the later Caliph al-Mustansir. The Sahrij al-Bgar is no longer in use and lies empty today, but was probably part of the same garden estate at the time. This vast estate was in turn enclosed by a 6-mile-long wall (absent today). The Menara's location to the west of the city walls is also consistent with the fact that Abd al-Mu'min still used the former Almoravid palace, the Ksar al-Hajjar (located next to the present-day site of the Kutubiyya Mosque), as his residence. The gardens are also perfectly aligned with Bab al-Makhzen, the western gate of the city, near the palace, which Abd al-Mu'min would have likely used to go in and out of the city. The later palaces of the Kasbah, founded by the Almohads and to which the Agdal Gardens are connected today, were not yet built. The Agdal Gardens to the south of the city, in turn, were traditionally believed to date from Abd al-Mu'min's time as well but have been more conclusively dated to the reign of his successor Abu Ya'qub Yusuf.

In early sources the garden and its location was also called Shuntululya. The gardens were likely designed by an engineer from Malaga (Al-Andalus) named Hajj al-Ya'ish, who was also responsible for designing other mechanical projects under Abd al-Mu'min such as the automated maqsura and minbar of the Kutubiyya Mosque. One historical source, the Ḥulal al-Mawshiyya, describes how the estate's second water basin (the Sahrij al-Bgar) was used at one point to train the ḥuffāẓ (singular ḥāfiẓ; meaning "Qur'an reader") how to swim.

The gardens and the city underwent a period of decline after the fall of the Almohads in the 13th century, when the Marinids moved the capital to Fez. When the Saadian dynasty made Marrakesh the capital again in the 16th century, they also restored the gardens of the city. It was the Saadians who initially built a pleasure pavilion overlooking the water reservoir. However, the gardens owe their current condition to the reigns of the Alaouite sultans Moulay Abd ar-Rahman (ruled 1822–1859) and his son Muhammad IV (ruled 1859–1873), who restored and replanted both the Menara and Agdal gardens. Under the reign of Abd ar-Rahman, his son Muhammad was viceroy in Marrakesh and was responsible for carrying a part of the works, which then continued when Muhammad himself became sultan after his father. In addition to replanting the orchards and restoring the city's water supply system, Muhammad also built the current pavilion on the ruins of the old Saadian one, completed in 1870. (Note: a smaller number of sources cite the earlier 18th-century Alaouite sultan Muhammad ibn Abdallah, who restored and built many other structures in Marrakesh, as the one who restored the Menara Gardens, although the pavilion's construction is precisely dated thanks to an inscription on the archway of its balcony.) Up until the early 20th century the gardens were also used to raise ostriches, in line with a long tradition of sultans using wild animals to impress and entertain visitors.

== Description ==
=== Geography ===
The gardens are located on a topographically flat area west of the city, outside the historic city walls and very close to the Menara Airport. Today they still consist of the large central water basin, its historical pavilion, and a very large orchard around it. Together they cover a quadrilateral area about 1200 meters long (from northwest to southeast) and between 720 and 800 meters wide (from southwest to northeast). The water reservoir has a rectangular shape 195 meters long and 160 meters wide.

=== Orchards ===
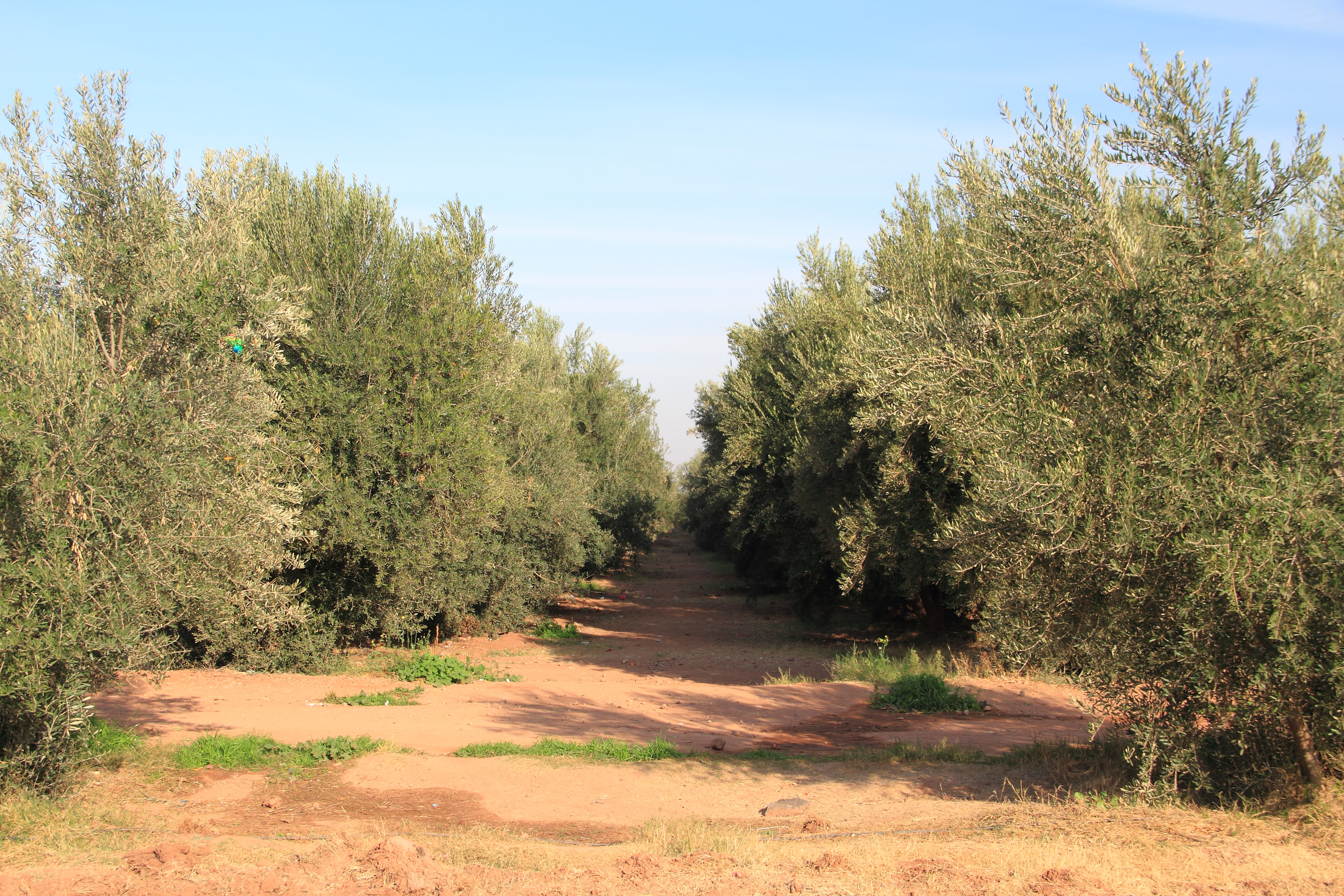
Olive tree plantations in the gardens

Royal Moroccan gardens like the Menara were designed for a primarily productive agricultural purpose, with its recreational purpose coming second. While there have not been many comprehensive archeological investigations of these gardens, historical texts provide some information about what was planted here and in other gardens like the Agdal. Throughout their history they were planted similar types of trees and crops, mostly fruit and olive trees. Today the orchard still consists mostly of olive trees and to a lesser extent fruit trees and cypress trees. The trees are planted in a regular 10-meter grid.

=== Irrigation and water supply ===
The orchards are watered via an irrigation system which required regular maintenance. During periods of neglect and decline in the city's history, they were prone to desertification. The creation of large water basins was designed to store large amounts of water which could be used to water the gardens year-round, even during the winter when rivers and other sources were typically dry. Water was brought to the city and to the gardens by a network of khettaras: an ancient method where underground channels were dug at a steady gradient from lowland areas to tap directly into the phreatic table of upland areas (in this case the nearby High Atlas Mountains). The water reservoir of the Menara is in turn built above ground so that the surrounding orchards, located at the lower ground level, could be watered with the help of gravity. The walkway around the reservoir is reached by various stairs. At the foot of the stairs on the northeast side is a small ornamental octagonal basin and former fountain.

=== The pavilion ===
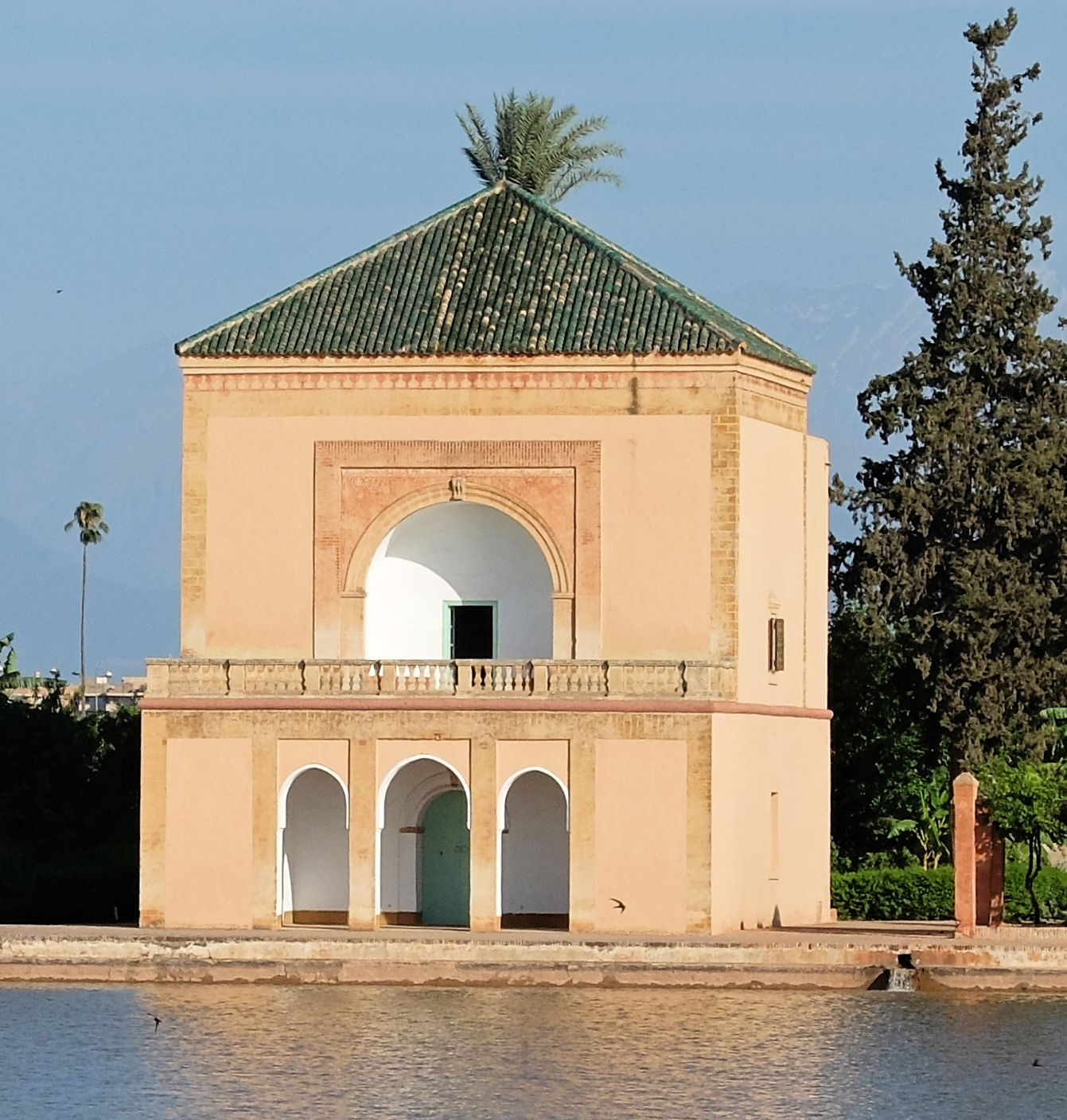
The northern facade of the pavilion

The 19th century pavilion or menzeh, built in stone, has a rectangular floor plan, two floors, and is topped by a pyramidal green-tiled roof. It has been described as a classic example of royal pavilion architecture in Morocco during the Alaouite period. The first floor, which was functional and used for domestic purposes, consists of a large room between four heavy pillars, plus an exterior triple-arched portico that projects northwards and opens onto the edge of the artificial lake. An entrance doorway is also located on the south side of the building. The upper floor is reached via a steep straight staircase. This upper floor consists of a large square room, with a low rectangular door that leads to a rectangular balcony on its north side on top of the projecting ground-floor portico. The low door was possibly made this way to prevent public onlookers below from seeing inside the building when it was open. The staircase to the upper floor also continues to the roof, where a much smaller balcony on the south side provided views over the orchards and towards the Atlas Mountains. The pavilion is also set inside its own small garden area enclosed by its another wall, separating it from the rest of the public grounds around it.

As with other Alaouite structures of the 18th-19th centuries, the decoration of the pavilion is relatively austere compared to earlier periods of Moroccan architecture. On the exterior, the corners and edges of the pavilion's walls are painted to look like brickwork, while geometric and epigraphic decoration are painted around the southern entrance doorway and around some of the windows. The door to the northern balcony overlooking the water is framed on the outside by a large, prominent, semi-circular blind arch highlighted with a keystone motif. The spandrels of the arch are painted with arabesque motifs, above which a narrow horizontal band is filled by an Arabic inscription that includes the completion date of the building (1286 AH). All the painted decoration is executed in ochre colours on a layer of plaster that covers the outside and inside of the building. The interior chambers of the building have decoration consisting of painted lines that highlight the groin vault ceilings, stucco carved and painted with geometric patterns around the windows and doors, and painted wood ceilings and door leaves.

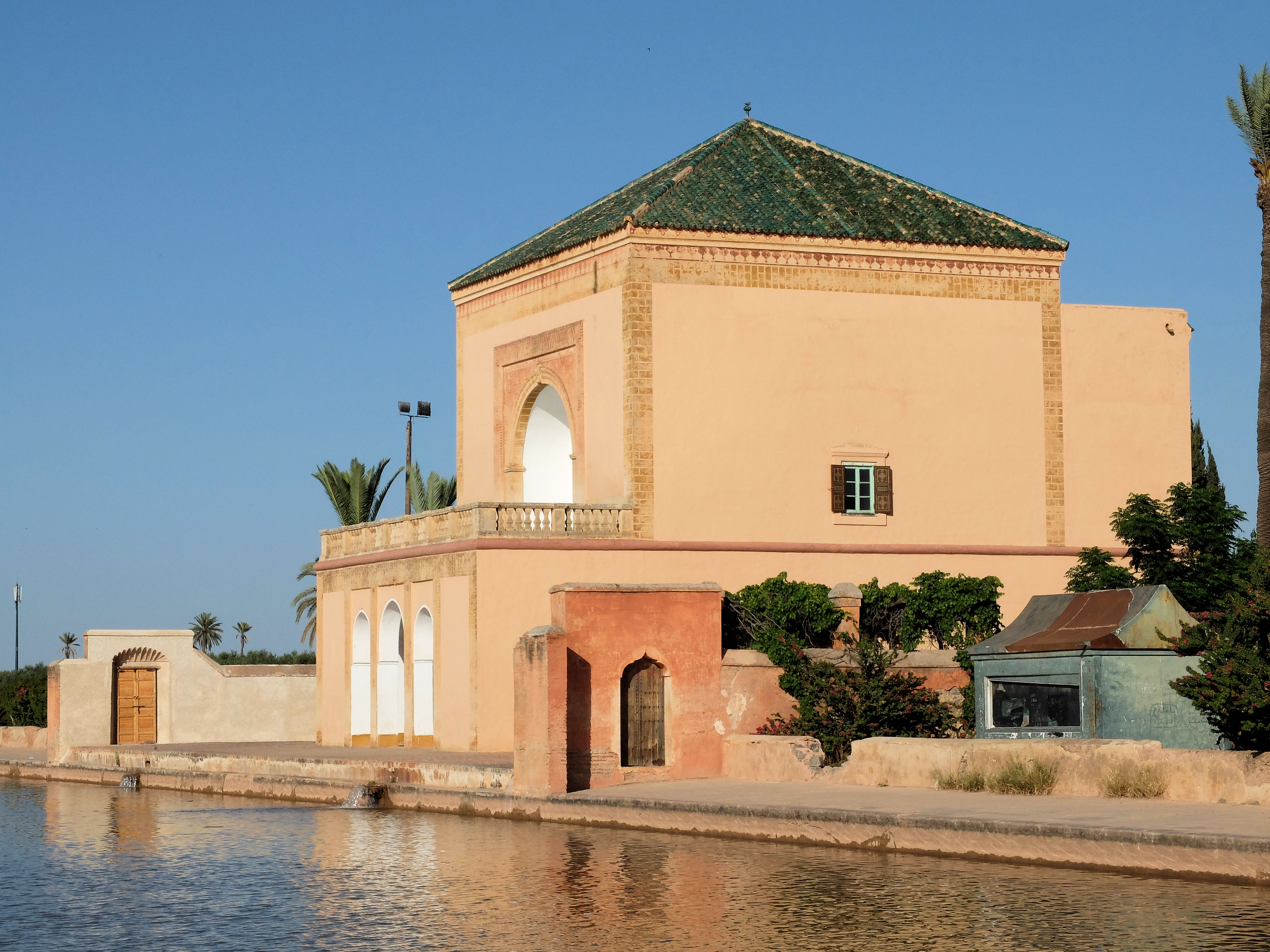
View of the pavilion and its surrounding walled enclosure on the edge of the reservoir

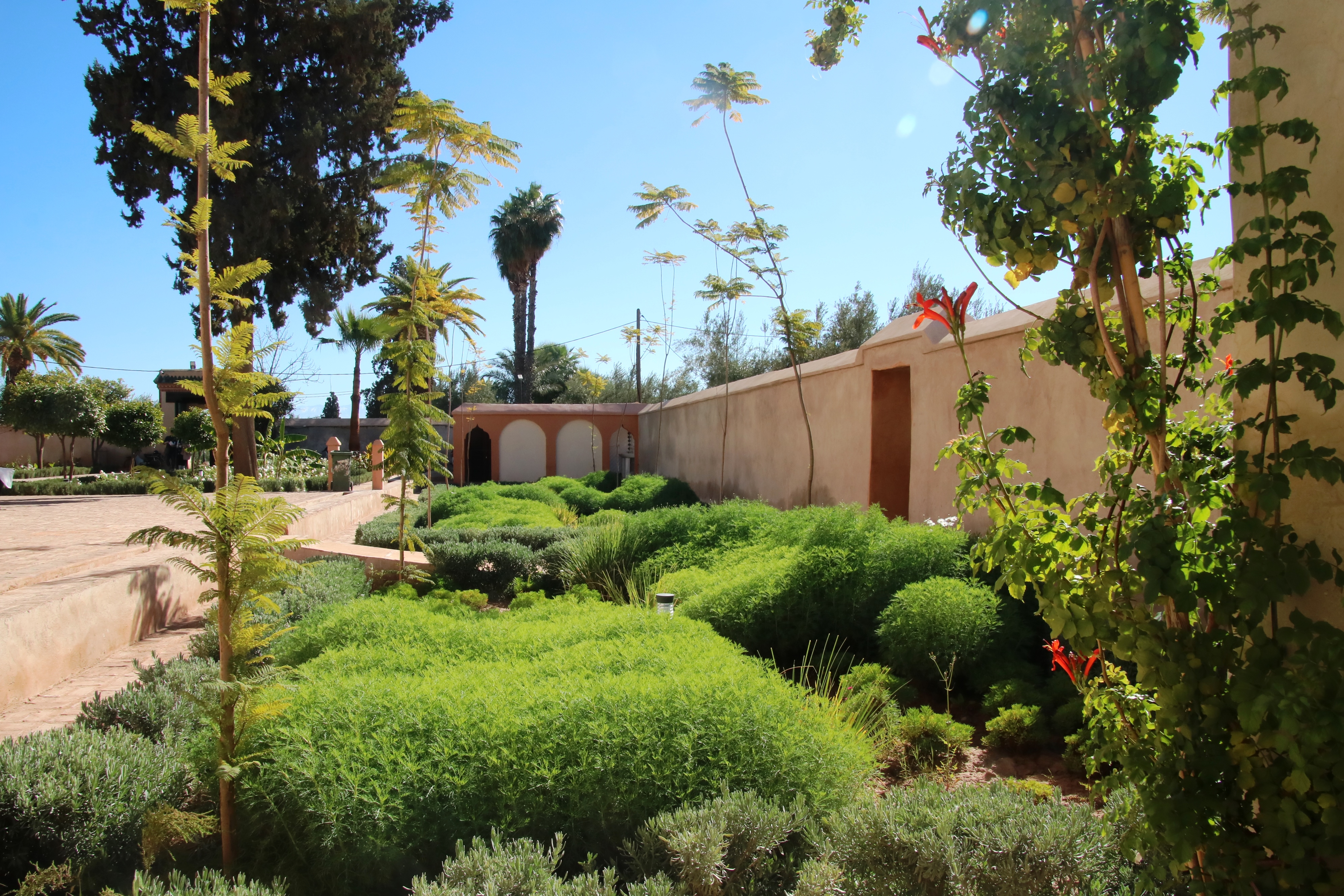
The inner garden enclosure around the pavilion

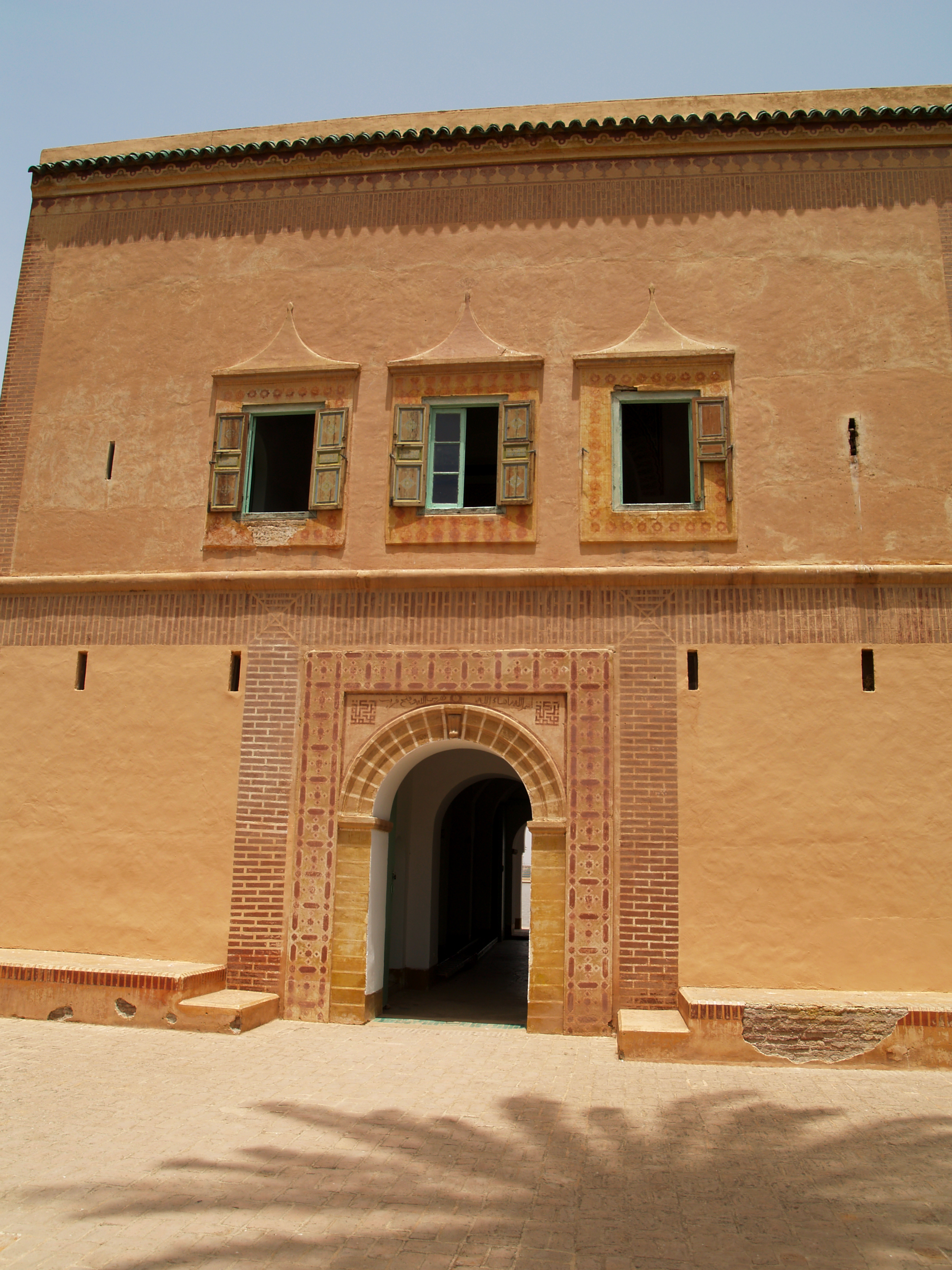
The southern entrance to the pavilion

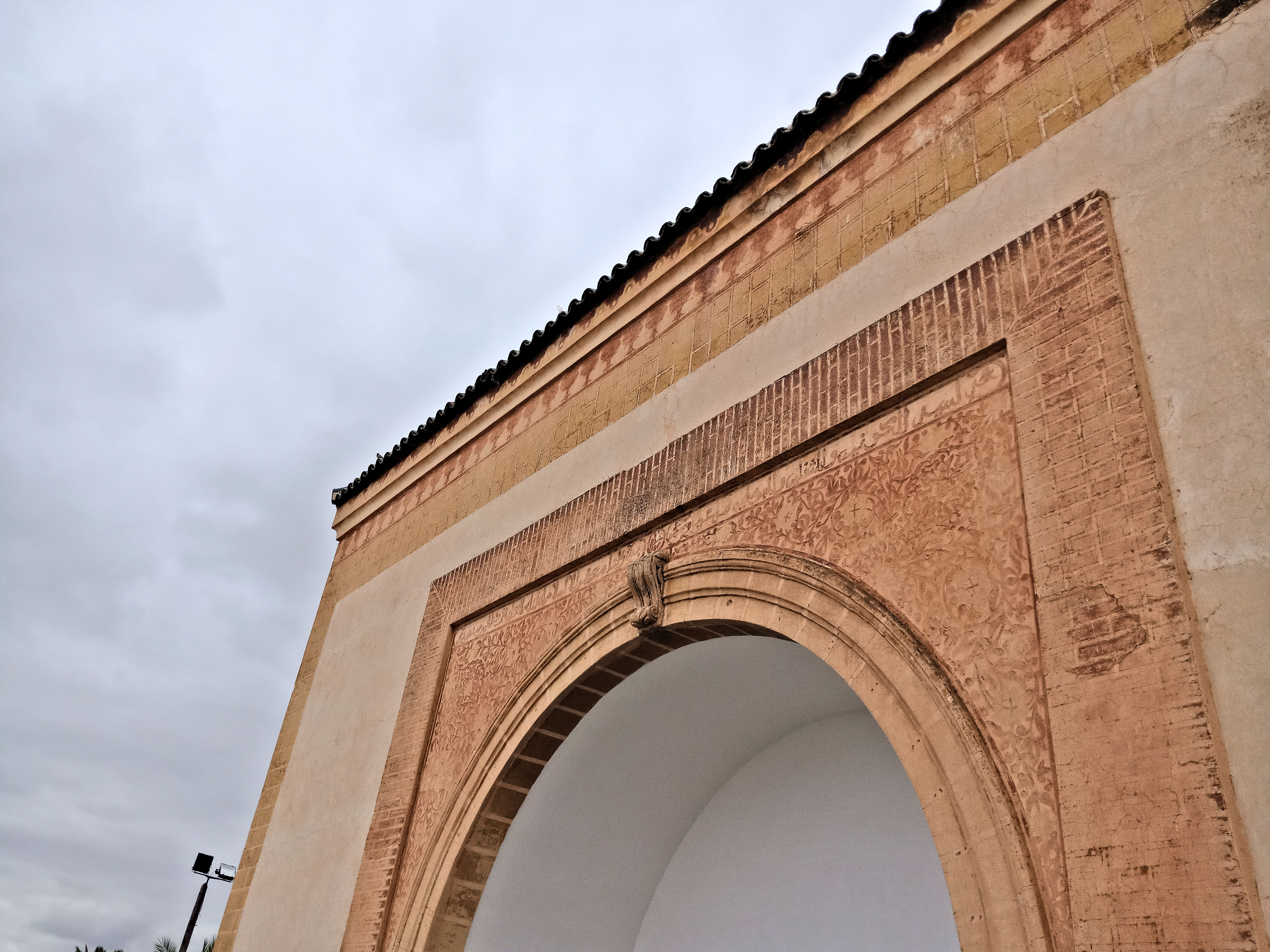
Painted decoration around the blind archway over the northern balcony

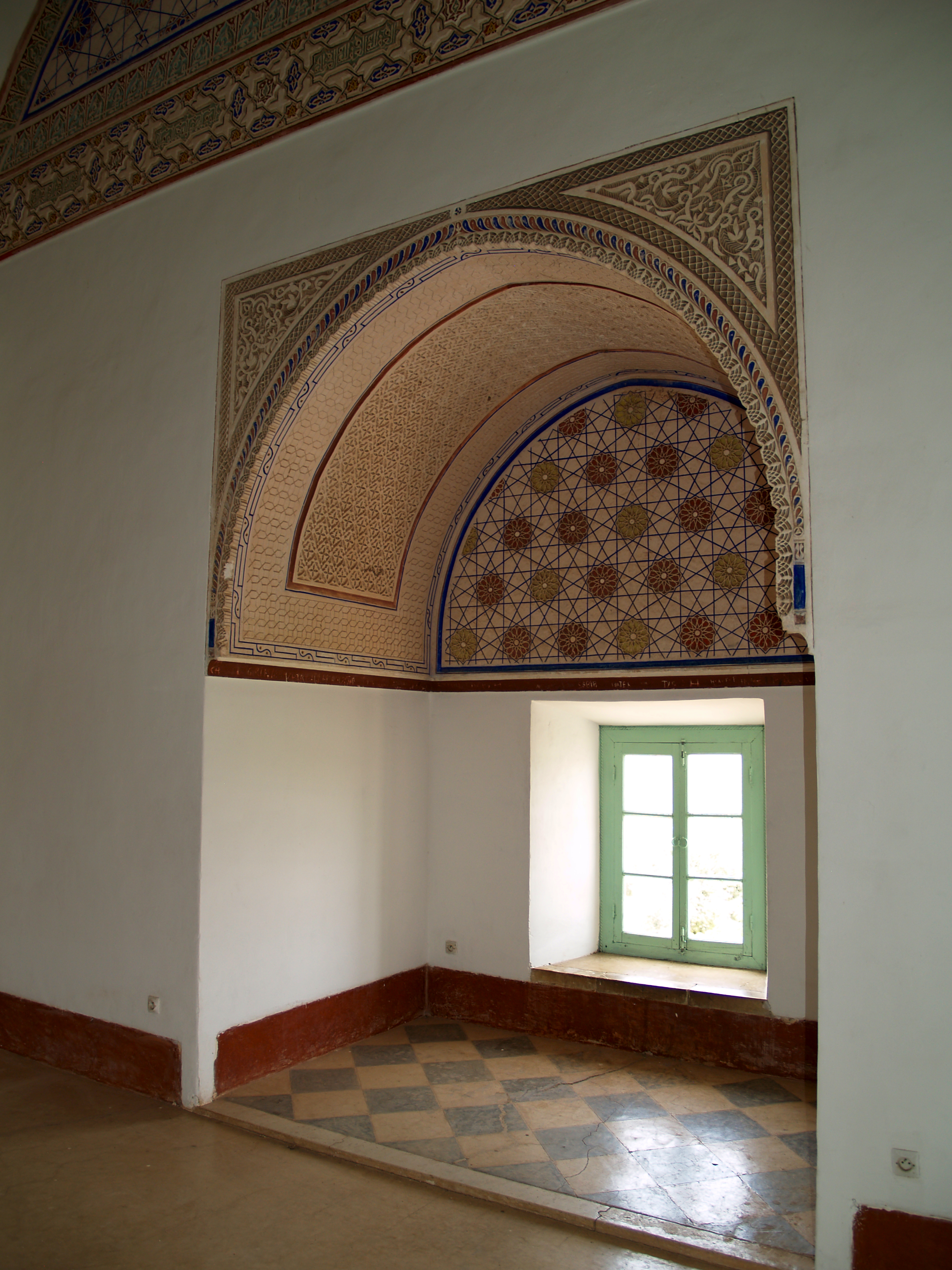
Interior of the pavilion, with stucco decoration around a window

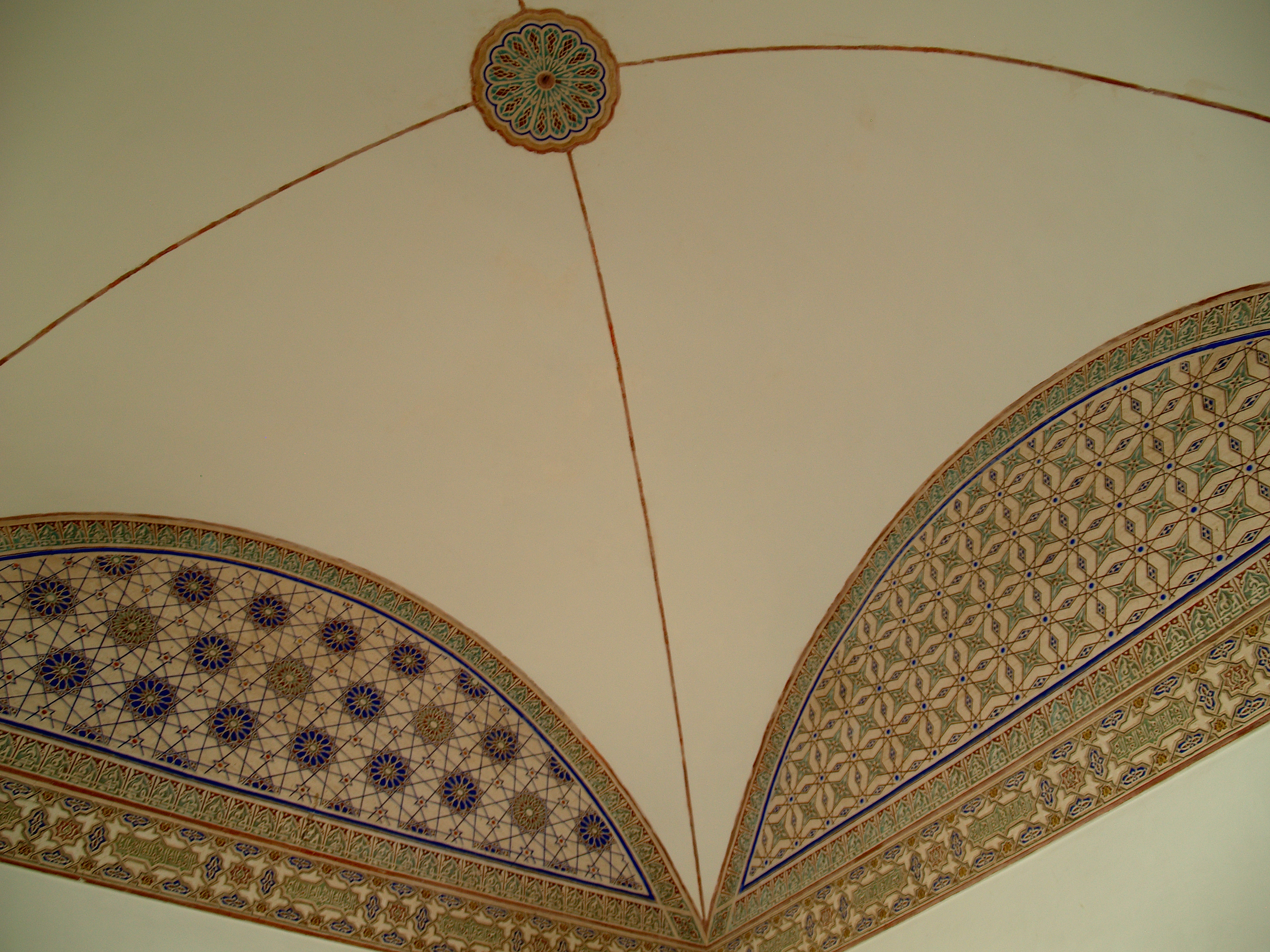
Painted decoration around a vaulted ceiling

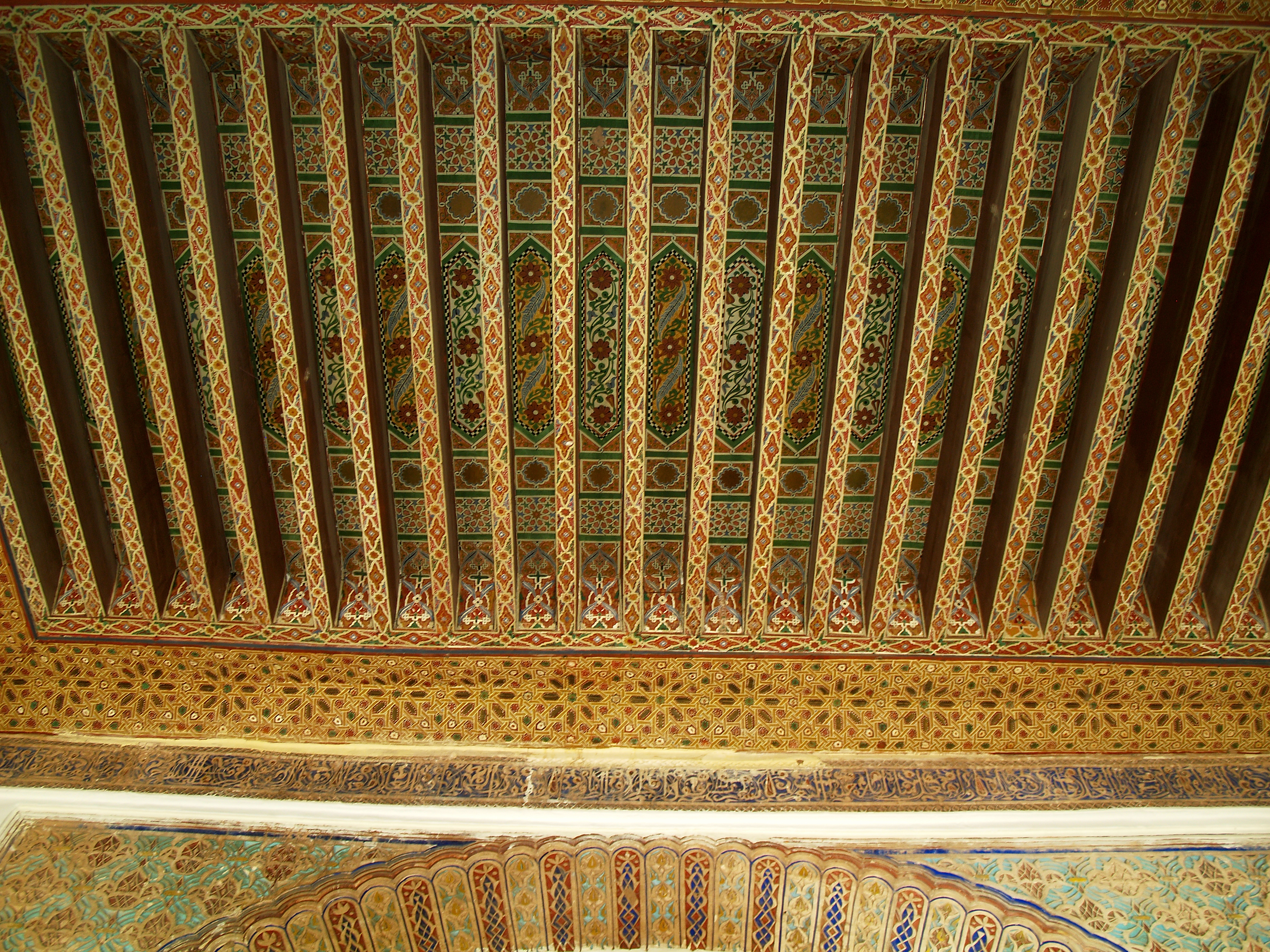
Painted wood ceiling in the pavilion

== See also ==
- Buhaira Gardens
- Landmarks of Marrakesh
