= Buhaira Gardens =

Historic monument in Seville, Spain

Coordinates: 37°22′57.6″N 5°58′45.1″W

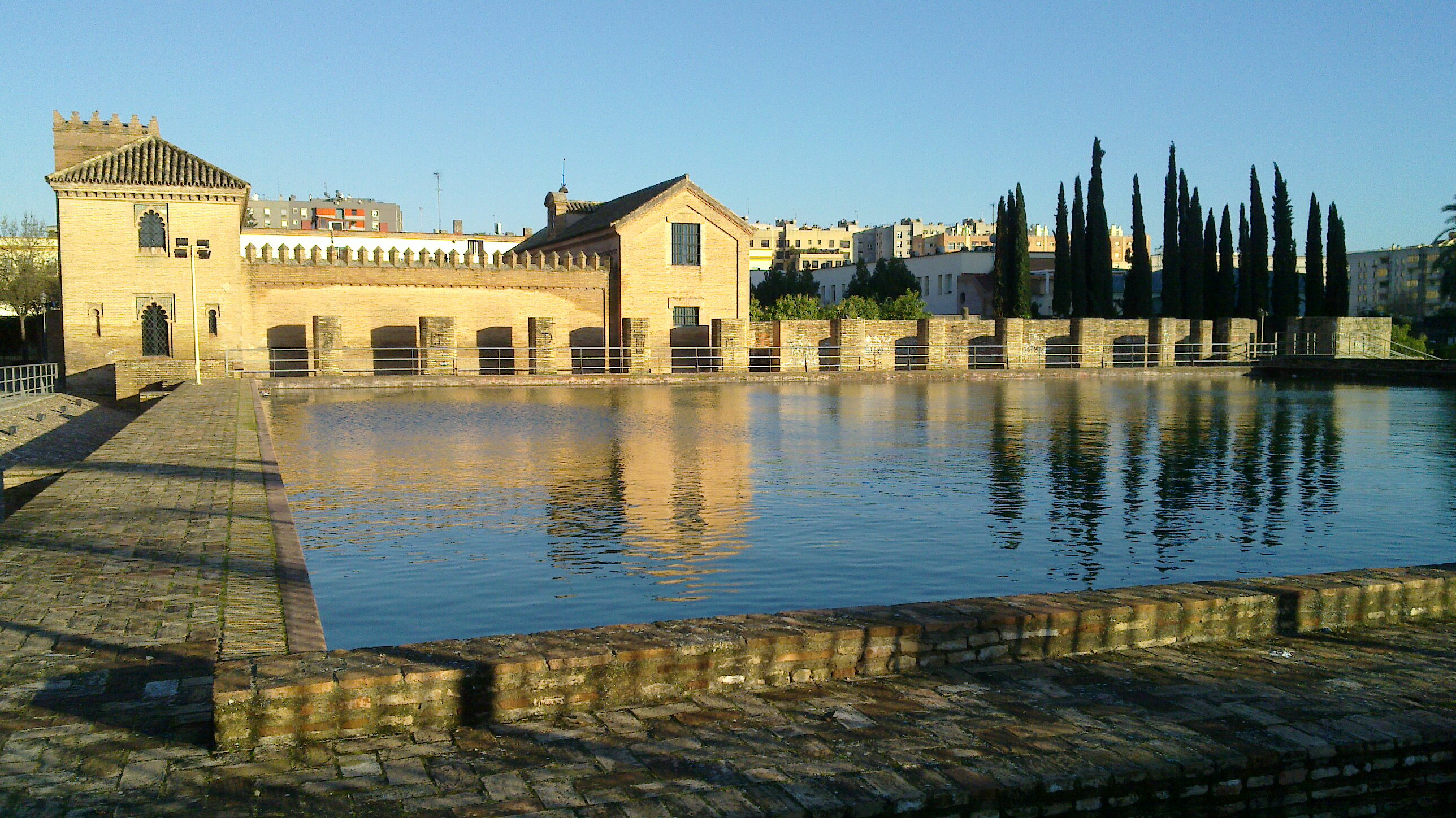
View of the Buhaira water basin, with the restored remains of the foundations of the former eastern Almohad pavilion, partly occupied by a more recent Mudéjar building

The Buhaira Gardens, also known as the Buhaira Palace or the Buḥayra (transliteration of Arabic: بحيرة), is a former Almohad garden and palace in Seville, Spain. It was created in the 12th century. After the Reconquista it was also known in Spanish as the Huerta del Rey ("Garden of the King") or Huerta Dabenahofar in its later history. It is now a public park and historic site.

== Name ==
The name buhaira is from the Arabic word buḥayra (Arabic: بحيرة), meaning "little sea". This name was used for many gardens and country estates during the Almohad period (12th-13th centuries) that featured artificial lakes or reservoirs. Historical Arabic sources also used this name for the Agdal Gardens of Marrakesh (Morocco), for example.

== History ==
The construction of the Buḥayra complex was begun in 1171 on the orders of the Almohad caliph Abu Yaqub Yusuf (r. 1163–1184), who also commissioned many other construction and renovation projects throughout Seville, including the new Great Mosque (later converted to the Cathedral). At the time, Seville served as the Almohad capital of Al-Andalus. The new country estate was located at the site of an already existing natural lagoon, just outside the eastern city walls, near the gate known as Puerta de la Carne ("Meat Gate"). Its conception followed the example of earlier Almohad country estates just outside Rabat and Marrakesh in Morocco (e.g. the Menara Gardens). At least three such suburban estates existed on the outskirts of Seville during this period, known as Buhayrat al-Wadi, Buhayrat Bab Jahwar, and Buhayrat Hisn al-Faraj.

Historical Arabic sources reported that Ahmad ibn Baso, the same architect who designed the Great Mosque and the Giralda, was responsible for designing the palace building. The creation of the gardens was supervised by the governor of Seville, Shaykh Abu Dawud ibn Gallul (d. 1184), and an Almohad vizier, Abu'l-'Ala Idris, and his son, Abu Yahya. Al-Hajj al-Ya'ish, the same engineer who was responsible for various works in Marrakesh, designed the hydraulic infrastructure of the gardens. The gardens were supplied with water by a Roman aqueduct (now known as the Caños de Carmona) which Abu Yaqub Yusuf ordered to be reconstructed in order to supply both this palace and the larger Alcazar Palace. Construction on the palace and gardens was finished in February 1172 and inaugurated with a grand celebration.

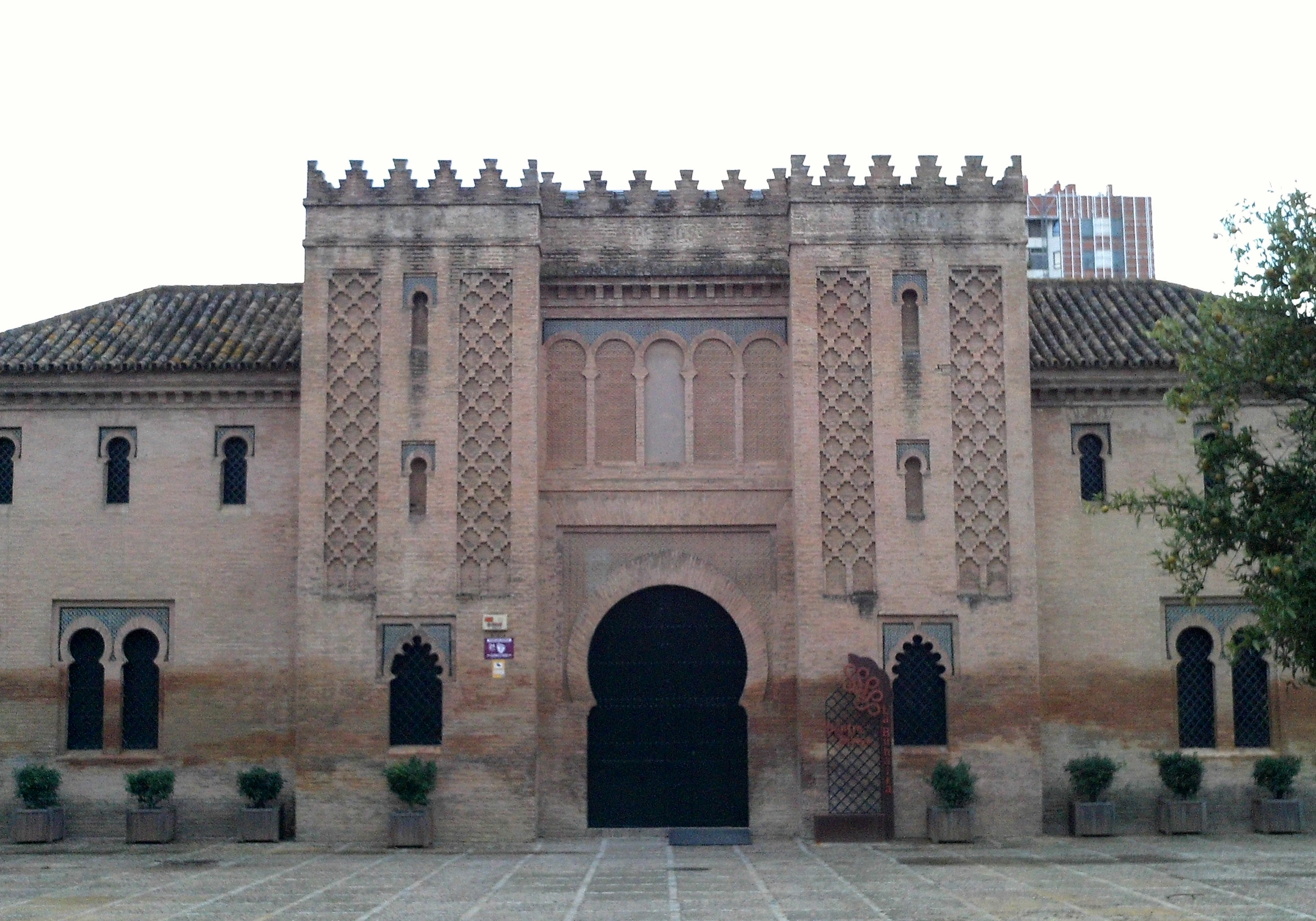
The 19th-century Mudéjar-style pavilion on the east side of the gardens

The gardens abandoned in subsequent centuries, after the city came under Spanish Christian control. In the 19th century a Mudéjar palace was built next to the water reservoir and still stands today, over the foundations of an earlier Almohad palace structure. The site of the palace was first studied and excavated in 1971 by Francisco Collantes de Terán and Juan Zozaya. Further excavations and archaeological studies were undertaken in 1982, 1985, and 1994. After this, the site was restored and integrated into a public park, inaugurated in 1999. A major road, Avenida de la Buhaira, now runs through the former estate and next to the restored water basin.

== Design ==
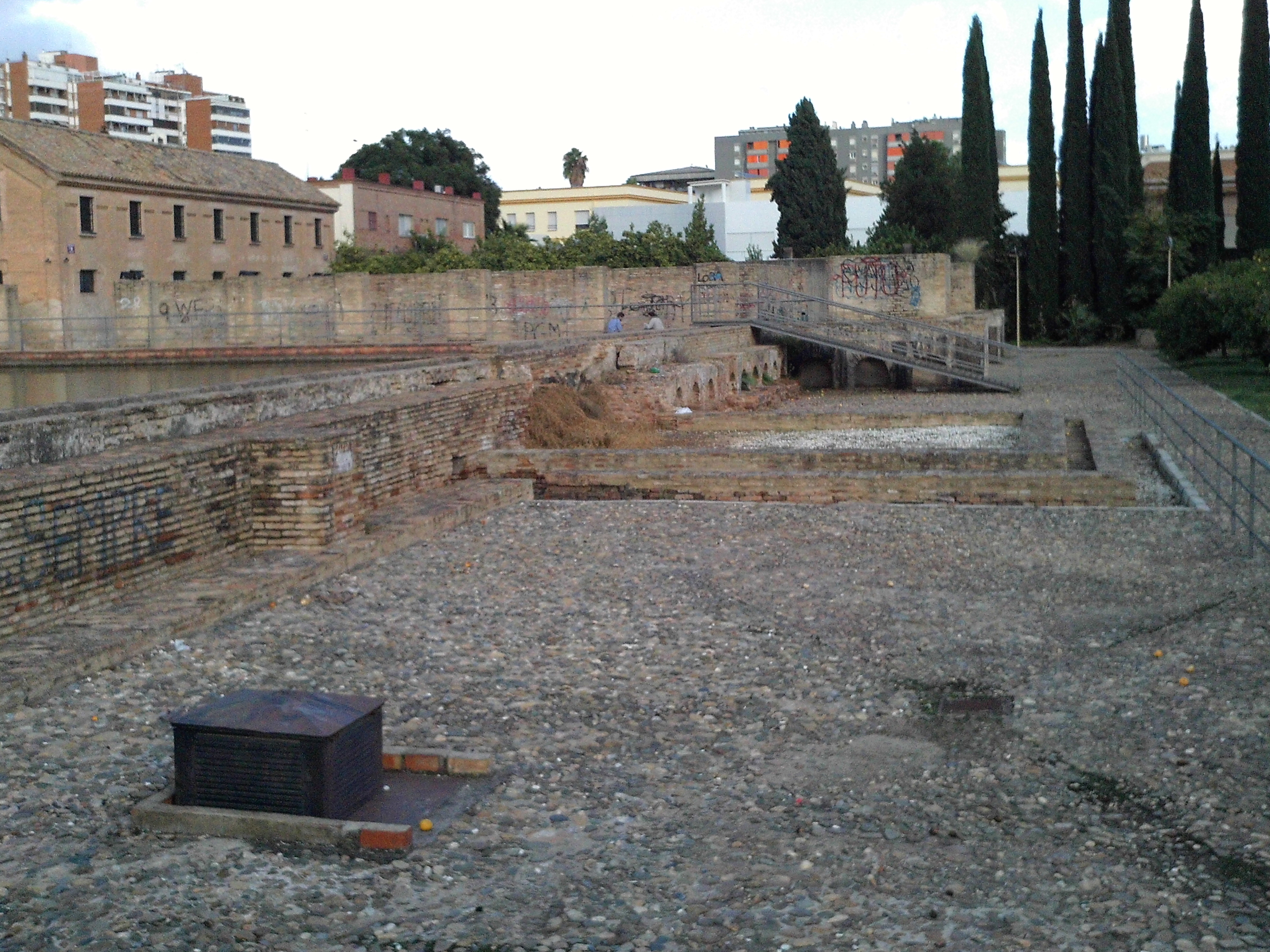
Outlined remains of the square pavilion on the south side of the water basin

The gardens and their palaces were originally surrounded by a wall made of rammed earth, known as the Ha'it as-Sultan ("Wall of the Sultan"). The Almohad water reservoir, which has been restored and is still visible today, measures 43 by 43 meters and is 2 meters deep. The reservoir's walls rise slightly above the ground and are reinforced with buttresses. Water arrived via an aqueduct from the east and was discharged into the reservoir through a spout at the middle of the reservoir's south side. Any excess water from the aqueduct continued to flow past the reservoir and discharged into the gardens to the west. Three other drains also allowed water to leave the reservoir.

The remains of a square pavilion have been found on the south side of the reservoir, aligned with the reservoir's central axis and coinciding with the entry point of water into the reservoir. The pavilion may have been open on all sides and served as a lookout and leisure area for the caliph. The pavilion may have been covered by either a dome or a pyramidal roof. A much large rectangular pavilion or palace structure occupied the eastern side of the pavilion. Some of its foundations are visible today. It consisted of a large central hall with side chambers, which in turn were surrounded on all four sides by an arcaded gallery. The corners of the building were occupied by heavy square buttresses.

According to historical sources, the gardens around the reservoir and palace were planted with some ten thousand pear trees, apple trees, fig trees, olive trees, and other fruit trees. The gardens were planted in this way up until at least 1195. In the late 15th or early 16th century, the Venetian ambassador Andrea Navagero noted that orange trees grew around the reservoir.

Some aspects of the palace and reservoir layout had precedents in older Andalusi palaces of the 10th century, such as Madinat al-Zahra. In turn, the layout of the Buḥayra palace may have been a prototype for the design of some later Nasrid palaces such as the Partal Palace and the Generalife.
