= 2000 IAAF World Cross Country Championships – Men's short race =

Men's short race at the 2000 IAAF World Cross Country Championships
- Organisers: IAAF
- Edition: 28th
- Date: March 18
- Host city: Vilamoura, Algarve, Portugal
- Venue: Sporting Complex of Vilamoura
- Events: 1
- Distances: 4.18 km – Men's short
- Participation: 165 athletes from 51 nations

The Men's short race at the 2000 IAAF World Cross Country Championships was held at the Sporting Complex in Vilamoura, Portugal, on March 18, 2000. Reports of the event were given in The New York Times, in the Glasgow Herald, and for the IAAF.

Complete results for individuals, for teams, medallists, and the results of British athletes who took part were published.

== Race results ==
=== Men's short race (4.18 km) ===
==== Individual ====
Rank	Athlete	Country	Time
1st place, gold medalist(s)	John Kibowen	Kenya	11:11
2nd place, silver medalist(s)	Sammy Kipketer	Kenya	11:12
3rd place, bronze medalist(s)	Paul Kosgei	Kenya	11:15
4	Leonard Mucheru	Kenya	11:21
5	Abraham Chebii	Kenya	11:25
6	Haylu Mekonnen	Ethiopia	11:27
7	Philip Mosima	Kenya	11:29
8	Saïd El Wardi	Morocco	11:33
9	Laïd Bessou	Algeria	11:34
10	Sergiy Lebid	Ukraine	11:36
11	Abiyote Abate	Ethiopia	11:36
12	Martin Sulle	Tanzania	11:37
13	Ali Ezzine	Morocco	11:39
14	Dagne Alemu	Ethiopia	11:39
15	Million Wolde	Ethiopia	11:42
16	Ali Saïdi-Sief	Algeria	11:44
17	Michael Ngaaseke	Zimbabwe	11:46
18	Aziz Driouche	Morocco	11:47
19	Faustin Baha	Tanzania	11:49
20	Whaddon Nieuwoudt	South Africa	11:50
21	Gennaro Di Napoli	Italy	11:50
22	José Ramos	Portugal	11:51
23	Luís Feiteira	Portugal	11:51
24	Rui Silva	Portugal	11:51
25	Kevin Sullivan	Canada	11:51
26	Miloud Abaoub	Algeria	11:52
27	Damian Kallabis	Germany	11:52
28	Manuel Pancorbo	Spain	11:52
29	Youssef Baba	Morocco	11:53
30	Sebastian Hallmann	Germany	11:55
31	Manuel Damião	Portugal	11:55
32	Daniel Zegeye	Ethiopia	11:55
33	Víctor Morente	Spain	11:56
34	Jesús de la Fuente	Spain	11:56
35	Yousef El Nasri	Spain	11:56
36	Lotfi Turki	Tunisia	11:57
37	Kamel Boulahfane	Algeria	11:57
38	David Heath	United Kingdom	11:57
39	Davide Maffei	Italy	11:58
40	Salah El Ghazi	Morocco	11:58
41	Gert-Jan Liefers	Netherlands	11:59
42	Mourad Benslimani	Algeria	11:59
43	Mohamed Awol	Ethiopia	11:59
44	Miroslav Vanko	Slovakia	12:00
45	Jason Stewart	United States	12:00
46	Hélder Ornelas	Portugal	12:01
47	Glody Dube	Botswana	12:01
48	Julius Gidabuday	Tanzania	12:01
49	Salvador Miranda	Mexico	12:02
50	Scott Strand	United States	12:02
51	Jirka Arndt	Germany	12:02
52	Joseph Nsengiyumya	Rwanda	12:03
53	Freddy González	Venezuela	12:03
54	Sean Kaley	Canada	12:04
55	Edgar de Oliveira	Brazil	12:05
56	Massimo Pegoretti	Italy	12:05
57	Hussein Abdallah	Tanzania	12:05
58	Stéphane Franke	Germany	12:06
59	Mustafa El Ahmadi	France	12:06
60	Mauricio Ladino	Colombia	12:06
61	Mikhail Minyukhin	Russia	12:06
62	Roland Weissteiner	Italy	12:07
63	Gianni Crepaldi	Italy	12:07
64	Rob Whalley	United Kingdom	12:08
65	Phil Mowbray	United Kingdom	12:08
66	Sergey Fedotov	Russia	12:08
67	Toshihiro Iwasa	Japan	12:08
68	Sergey Lukin	Russia	12:09
69	Michael Power	Australia	12:09
70	Rafał Wójcik	Poland	12:09
71	Phillip Clode	New Zealand	12:10
72	Joël Bourgeois	Canada	12:12
73	Pacifique Ayabusa	Rwanda	12:13
74	Mohamed Abdelli	Algeria	12:14
75	Mohamed Ezzher	France	12:14
76	Alberto Chaíça	Portugal	12:15
77	Driss Maazouzi	France	12:16
78	Andy Graffin	United Kingdom	12:17
79	Andy Downin	United States	12:18
80	Igor Murga	Spain	12:18
81	Ayele Setegne	Israel	12:18
82	Eliseo Martín	Spain	12:19
83	Ahmed Abd El Mangoud	Egypt	12:19
84	Cédric Andres	France	12:20
85	Sergey Yemelyanov	Russia	12:20
86	Jeff Simonich	United States	12:23
87	Néstor Nieves	Venezuela	12:25
88	Chad Pons	United States	12:26
89	Spencer Barden	United Kingdom	12:27
90	Emigadio Delgado	Venezuela	12:28
91	Éric Dubus	France	12:28
92	Ramiro Nogueiro	Brazil	12:29
93	Samir Benfarès	France	12:31
94	Frank Bruder	Germany	12:31
95	Simon Labiche	Seychelles	12:32
96	Víctor Martínez	Andorra	12:34
97	Matt Smith	United Kingdom	12:34
98	Jeremy Deere	Canada	12:35
99	Darin Shearer	United States	12:37
100	Froilan Bonilla	Venezuela	12:39
101	Hans Janssens	Belgium	12:39
102	Viktor Lomonosov	Belarus	12:39
103	Abd Al-Rasool Ahmed	Egypt	12:39
104	Celso Ficagna	Brazil	12:41
105	Lervis Arias	Venezuela	12:41
106	Farag Abdelnaby	Egypt	12:42
107	Richard Tremain	Canada	12:43
108	Abdelhak El Gorch	Morocco	12:46
109	Musa Ninga	Tanzania	12:47
110	Raghavan Suresh	India	12:48
111	Bashimi Maholeste	Botswana	12:48
112	Modisaotsile Olerile	Botswana	12:49
113	Wael Anwar	Egypt	12:50
114	Redmal Singh	India	12:51
115	Ndabili Bashingili	Botswana	12:52
116	Kaelo Mosalagae	Botswana	12:53
117	Simon Maunder	New Zealand	12:55
118	Hidajet Bulic	Bosnia and Herzegovina	12:56
119	Daniel das Neves	Brazil	12:58
120	Amrish Kumar	India	12:59
121	Yusuf Zepak	Turkey	13:01
122	Aleksandr Lukoshenko	Belarus	13:02
123	Hussein Awada	Lebanon	13:02
124	Hannes Mälter	Estonia	13:03
125	Ruslan Sadovskiy	Belarus	13:04
126	Sergey Zabavskiy	Tajikistan	13:05
127	Zigmund Zilbershtein	Georgia	13:05
128	Sanjay Gond	India	13:07
129	Heiki Sarapuu	Estonia	13:08
130	Abdel Salam Al-Dabajy	Palestine	13:09
131	Matt Kerr	Canada	13:11
132	Fouly Salem	Egypt	13:12
133	Ali Awad	Lebanon	13:17
134	Djamched Rasulov	Tajikistan	13:24
135	Charygeldiy Allaberdiyev	Turkmenistan	13:25
136	Mark Olivo	Venezuela	13:26
137	Sergey Anokhin	Azerbaijan	13:27
138	Carlos Almeida	Cape Verde	13:29
139	Siarhei Yudenkov	Belarus	13:34
140	Richard Muscat	Gibraltar	13:36
141	Vasiliy Andreyev	Uzbekistan	13:39
142	Mehdi Chebli	Lebanon	13:41
143	Maximillian Iranqhe	Tanzania	13:53
144	Nazar Begliyev	Turkmenistan	13:53
145	Liam Byrne	Gibraltar	13:54
146	Sokhibdjan Sharipov	Tajikistan	13:57
147	Vadim Bondarchuk	Uzbekistan	13:59
148	Michael Breed	Gibraltar	14:06
149	Christopher Walker	Gibraltar	14:15
150	Nozimjon Irmatov	Tajikistan	14:25
151	Mohamed Al-Bayed	Palestine	14:26
152	Omar Abdel Latif	Lebanon	14:39
153	Mikhail Gadelshin	Uzbekistan	14:40
154	Chokirjon Irmatov	Tajikistan	14:44
155	Sigurd Haveland	Gibraltar	14:53
156	Aleksandr Levdanskiy	Kyrgyzstan	15:27
157	James Parody	Gibraltar	15:30
158	Manukau Teuribaki	Kiribati	15:38
159	Gairat Nigmatov	Tajikistan	15:57
160	Yevgeniy Nujdin	Uzbekistan	16:04
161	Baimurad Achirmuradov	Turkmenistan	16:21
162	Kaong Bwebwereiti	Kiribati	17:32
163	Tekooki Teieka	Kiribati	17:33
164	Simon Burennatu	Kiribati	17:41
—	Luciano Di Pardo	Italy	DNF
—	Selvin Gonzalo Molineros Ardon	Guatemala	DNS
—	José Amado García	Guatemala	DNS
—	José Luis Ebatela Nvó	Equatorial Guinea	DNS
—	Sheldon Monderoy	Trinidad and Tobago	DNS

==== Teams ====
Rank	Team	Points
1st place, gold medalist(s)	Kenya: John Kibowen / 1; Sammy Kipketer / 2; Paul Kosgei / 3; Leonard Mucheru / 4; (Abraham Chebii) / (5); (Philip Mosima) / (7)	10
2nd place, silver medalist(s)	Ethiopia: Haylu Mekonnen / 6; Abiyote Abate / 11; Dagne Alemu / 14; Million Wolde / 15; (Daniel Zegeye) / (32); (Mohamed Awol) / (43)	46
3rd place, bronze medalist(s)	Morocco: Saïd El Wardi / 8; Ali Ezzine / 13; Aziz Driouche / 18; Youssef Baba / 29; (Salah El Ghazi) / (40); (Abdelhak El Gorch) / (108)	68
4	Algeria: Laïd Bessou / 9; Ali Saïdi-Sief / 16; Miloud Abaoub / 26; Kamel Boulahfane / 37; (Mourad Benslimani) / (42); (Mohamed Abdelli) / (74)	88
5	Portugal: José Ramos / 22; Luís Feiteira / 23; Rui Silva / 24; Manuel Damião / 31; (Hélder Ornelas) / (46); (Alberto Chaíça) / (76)	100
6	Spain: Manuel Pancorbo / 28; Víctor Morente / 33; Jesús de la Fuente / 34; Yousef El Nasri / 35; (Igor Murga) / (80); (Eliseo Martín) / (82)	130
7	Tanzania: Martin Sulle / 12; Faustin Baha / 19; Julius Gidabuday / 48; Hussein Abdallah / 57; (Musa Ninga) / (109); (Maximillian Iranqhe) / (143)	136
8	Germany: Damian Kallabis / 27; Sebastian Hallmann / 30; Jirka Arndt / 51; Stéphane Franke / 58; (Frank Bruder) / (94)	166
9	Italy: Gennaro Di Napoli / 21; Davide Maffei / 39; Massimo Pegoretti / 56; Roland Weissteiner / 62; (Gianni Crepaldi) / (63); (Luciano Di Pardo) / (DNF)	178
10	United Kingdom: David Heath / 38; Rob Whalley / 64; Phil Mowbray / 65; Andy Graffin / 78; (Spencer Barden) / (89); (Matt Smith) / (97)	245
11	Canada: Kevin Sullivan / 25; Sean Kaley / 54; Joël Bourgeois / 72; Jeremy Deere / 98; (Richard Tremain) / (107); (Matt Kerr) / (131)	249
12	United States: Jason Stewart / 45; Scott Strand / 50; Andy Downin / 79; Jeff Simonich / 86; (Chad Pons) / (88); (Darin Shearer) / (99)	260
13	Russia: Mikhail Minyukhin / 61; Sergey Fedotov / 66; Sergey Lukin / 68; Sergey Yemelyanov / 85	280
14	France: Mustafa El Ahmadi / 59; Mohamed Ezzher / 75; Driss Maazouzi / 77; Cédric Andres / 84; (Éric Dubus) / (91); (Samir Benfarès) / (93)	295
15	Venezuela: Freddy González / 53; Néstor Nieves / 87; Emigadio Delgado / 90; Froilan Bonilla / 100; (Lervis Arias) / (105); (Mark Olivo) / (136)	330
16	Brazil: Edgar de Oliveira / 55; Ramiro Nogueiro / 92; Celso Ficagna / 104; Daniel das Neves / 119	370
17	Botswana: Glody Dube / 47; Bashimi Maholeste / 111; Modisaotsile Olerile / 112; Ndabili Bashingili / 115; (Kaelo Mosalagae) / (116)	385
18	Egypt: Ahmed Abd El Mangoud / 83; Abd Al-Rasool Ahmed / 103; Farag Abdelnaby / 106; Wael Anwar / 113; (Fouly Salem) / (132)	405
19	India: Raghavan Suresh / 110; Redmal Singh / 114; Amrish Kumar / 120; Sanjay Gond / 128	472
20	Belarus: Viktor Lomonosov / 102; Aleksandr Lukoshenko / 122; Ruslan Sadovskiy / 125; Siarhei Yudenkov / 139	488
21	Lebanon: Hussein Awada / 123; Ali Awad / 133; Mehdi Chebli / 142; Omar Abdel Latif / 152	550
22	Tajikistan: Sergey Zabavskiy / 126; Djamched Rasulov / 134; Sokhibdjan Sharipov / 146; Nozimjon Irmatov / 150; (Chokirjon Irmatov) / (154); (Gairat Nigmatov) / (159)	556
23	Gibraltar: Richard Muscat / 140; Liam Byrne / 145; Michael Breed / 148; Christopher Walker / 149; (Sigurd Haveland) / (155); (James Parody) / (157)	582
24	Uzbekistan: Vasiliy Andreyev / 141; Vadim Bondarchuk / 147; Mikhail Gadelshin / 153; Yevgeniy Nujdin / 160	601
25	Kiribati: Manukau Teuribaki / 158; Kaong Bwebwereiti / 162; Tekooki Teieka / 163; Simon Burennatu / 164	647

- Note: Athletes in parentheses did not score for the team result

== Participation ==
An unofficial count yields the participation of 165 athletes from 51 countries in the Men's short race. The announced athletes from Equatorial Guinea, Guatemala, and Trinidad and Tobago did not show.

- Algeria (6)
- Andorra (1)
- Australia (1)
- Azerbaijan (1)
- Belarus (4)
- Belgium (1)
- Bosnia and Herzegovina (1)
- Botswana (5)
- Brazil (4)
- Canada (6)
- Cape Verde (1)
- Colombia (1)
- Egypt (5)
- Estonia (2)
- Ethiopia (6)
- France (6)
- Georgia (1)
- Germany (5)
- Gibraltar (6)
- India (4)
- Israel (1)
- Italy (6)
- Japan (1)
- Kenya (6)
- Kiribati (4)
- Kyrgyzstan (1)
- Lebanon (4)
- Mexico (1)
- Morocco (6)
- Netherlands (1)
- New Zealand (2)
- Palestine (2)
- Poland (1)
- Portugal (6)
- Russia (4)
- Rwanda (2)
- Seychelles (1)
- Slovakia (1)
- South Africa (1)
- Spain (6)
- Tajikistan (6)
- Tanzania (6)
- Tunisia (1)
- Turkey (1)
- Turkmenistan (3)
- Ukraine (1)
- United Kingdom (6)
- United States (6)
- Uzbekistan (4)
- Venezuela (6)
- Zimbabwe (1)

== See also ==
- 2000 IAAF World Cross Country Championships – Senior men's race
- 2000 IAAF World Cross Country Championships – Junior men's race
- 2000 IAAF World Cross Country Championships – Senior women's race
- 2000 IAAF World Cross Country Championships – Women's short race
- 2000 IAAF World Cross Country Championships – Junior women's race
