= 2000 IAAF World Cross Country Championships – Senior men's race =

Senior men's race at the 2000 IAAF World Cross Country Championships
- Organisers: IAAF
- Edition: 28th
- Date: March 19
- Host city: Vilamoura, Algarve, Portugal
- Venue: Sporting Complex of Vilamoura
- Events: 1
- Distances: 12.3 km – Senior men
- Participation: 171 athletes from 54 nations

The Senior men's race at the 2000 IAAF World Cross Country Championships was held at the Sporting Complex in Vilamoura, Portugal, on March 19, 2000. Reports of the event were given in The New York Times, in the Herald, and for the IAAF.

Complete results for individuals, for teams, medallists, and the results of British athletes who took part were published.

== Race results ==
=== Senior men's race (12.3 km) ===
==== Individual ====
| Rank | Athlete | Country | Time |
|---|---|---|---|
| 1st place, gold medalist(s) | Mohammed Mourhit | Belgium | 35:00 |
| 2nd place, silver medalist(s) | Assefa Mezegebu | Ethiopia | 35:01 |
| 3rd place, bronze medalist(s) | Paul Tergat | Kenya | 35:02 |
| 4 | Patrick Ivuti | Kenya | 35:03 |
| 5 | Wilberforce Talel | Kenya | 35:06 |
| 6 | Paul Koech | Kenya | 35:22 |
| 7 | Charles Kamathi | Kenya | 35:51 |
| 8 | Sergiy Lebid | Ukraine | 35:52 |
| 9 | Abdellah Béhar | France | 35:55 |
| 10 | Eduardo Henriques | Portugal | 35:56 |
| 11 | Abraham Cherono | Kenya | 36:00 |
| 12 | Domingos Castro | Portugal | 36:01 |
| 13 | Karl Keska | United Kingdom | 36:13 |
| 14 | Zebedayo Bayo | Tanzania | 36:15 |
| 15 | John Nada Saya | Tanzania | 36:18 |
| 16 | Lemma Alemayehu | Ethiopia | 36:20 |
| 17 | Enrique Molina | Spain | 36:22 |
| 18 | Venry Hamalila | Zambia | 36:25 |
| 19 | Javier Cortés | Spain | 36:26 |
| 20 | Samir Moussaoui | Algeria | 36:26 |
| 21 | José Manuel Martínez | Spain | 36:27 |
| 22 | António Pinto | Portugal | 36:30 |
| 23 | Tesfaye Tola | Ethiopia | 36:33 |
| 24 | Mustapha Bamouh | Morocco | 36:42 |
| 25 | Paulo Guerra | Portugal | 36:44 |
| 26 | Meb Keflezighi | United States | 36:45 |
| 27 | Amebesse Tolossa | Ethiopia | 36:46 |
| 28 | Michael Ngaaseke | Zimbabwe | 36:48 |
| 29 | Alberto García | Spain | 36:51 |
| 30 | Wilbroad Axweso | Tanzania | 36:53 |
| 31 | Mathias Ntawulikura | Rwanda | 36:53 |
| 32 | Rachid Berradi | Italy | 36:58 |
| 33 | Claes Nyberg | Sweden | 37:01 |
| 34 | Glynn Tromans | United Kingdom | 37:03 |
| 35 | Benedict Ako | Tanzania | 37:05 |
| 36 | Mauricio Díaz | Chile | 37:07 |
| 37 | Sam Mwape | Zambia | 37:08 |
| 38 | Saïd Berrioui | Morocco | 37:15 |
| 39 | Abdelhadi Habassa | Morocco | 37:15 |
| 40 | Alejandro Gómez | Spain | 37:20 |
| 41 | Vincenzo Modica | Italy | 37:21 |
| 42 | Simone Zanon | Italy | 37:22 |
| 43 | Sergey Lukin | Russia | 37:22 |
| 44 | Dereje Tadesse | Ethiopia | 37:23 |
| 45 | Abdi Abdirahman | United States | 37:24 |
| 46 | Kamel Kohil | Algeria | 37:25 |
| 47 | Matt O'Dowd | United Kingdom | 37:26 |
| 48 | Marco Mazza | Italy | 37:28 |
| 49 | Mohamed Driouche | Algeria | 37:29 |
| 50 | Michael Aish | New Zealand | 37:30 |
| 51 | Teodoro Cuñado | Spain | 37:31 |
| 52 | Djamel Selatnia | Algeria | 37:31 |
| 53 | Obed Mutanya | Zambia | 37:31 |
| 54 | Stefan Van Den Broek | Belgium | 37:32 |
| 55 | Khamis Abdulla Saifeldin | Qatar | 37:33 |
| 56 | Alfredo Bráz | Portugal | 37:35 |
| 57 | Ahmed Ibrahim Warsama | Qatar | 37:35 |
| 58 | Brad Hauser | United States | 37:36 |
| 59 | Toshiya Kono | Japan | 37:36 |
| 60 | Joseph Nsengiyumya | Rwanda | 37:37 |
| 61 | Yonas Kifle | Eritrea | 37:37 |
| 62 | Jon Wild | United Kingdom | 37:43 |
| 63 | Andrew Panga | Tanzania | 37:47 |
| 64 | Benedito Gomes | Brazil | 37:48 |
| 65 | Alberto Maravilha | Portugal | 37:49 |
| 66 | Lahcen Benyoussef | Morocco | 37:52 |
| 67 | Peter Sherry | United States | 37:54 |
| 68 | Sergey Fedotov | Russia | 37:55 |
| 69 | Isidore Nizigiyimana | Burundi | 37:56 |
| 70 | Roberto Antonelli | Italy | 37:57 |
| 71 | Wellington Fraga | Brazil | 37:58 |
| 72 | Peter Matthews | Ireland | 38:00 |
| 73 | Noel Berkeley | Ireland | 38:07 |
| 74 | Debebe Demisse | Ethiopia | 38:09 |
| 75 | Medison Chibwe | Zambia | 38:11 |
| 76 | Nick Rogers | United States | 38:14 |
| 77 | Cian McLoughlin | Ireland | 38:15 |
| 78 | Mikhail Minyukhin | Russia | 38:17 |
| 79 | Angelo Carosi | Italy | 38:21 |
| 80 | Klaus-Peter Hansen | Denmark | 38:22 |
| 81 | George Mofokeng | South Africa | 38:25 |
| 82 | Ahmed Adam Saleh | Qatar | 38:25 |
| 83 | Dermot Donnelly | Ireland | 38:31 |
| 84 | Pacifique Ayabusa | Rwanda | 38:32 |
| 85 | Tau Khotso | Lesotho | 38:33 |
| 86 | Tom van Hooste | Belgium | 38:37 |
| 87 | Dmitriy Maksimov | Russia | 38:43 |
| 88 | Nick Comerford | United Kingdom | 38:45 |
| 89 | Paolo Doglio | Ireland | 38:46 |
| 90 | Faizal Emamaullee | Canada | 38:50 |
| 91 | Fidencio Torres | Mexico | 38:57 |
| 92 | Richard Arias | Ecuador | 38:57 |
| 93 | Takhir Mamashayev | Kazakhstan | 38:57 |
| 94 | Ville Hautala | Finland | 38:58 |
| 95 | Jussi Utriainen | Finland | 38:59 |
| 96 | Tayeb Kalloud | Algeria | 39:01 |
| 97 | Simon Vroemen | Netherlands | 39:06 |
| 98 | Steve Lawrence | Canada | 39:10 |
| 99 | Pasi Mattila | Finland | 39:12 |
| 100 | Marcel Matanin | Slovakia | 39:17 |
| 101 | Seamus Power | Ireland | 39:18 |
| 102 | Aleudo dos Santos | Brazil | 39:21 |
| 103 | Farag Abdelnaby | Egypt | 39:23 |
| 104 | Hiromitsu Sakakieda | Japan | 39:27 |
| 105 | Jerry van den Eede | Belgium | 39:32 |
| 106 | Vladimir Guerra | Ecuador | 39:34 |
| 107 | Rob Denmark | United Kingdom | 39:43 |
| 108 | Néstor Quinapanta | Ecuador | 39:43 |
| 109 | Jamal Abdi Hassan | Qatar | 39:44 |
| 110 | Tesfit Berhe | Eritrea | 39:45 |
| 111 | Shesh Mani | India | 39:46 |
| 112 | Zarislav Gapeyenko | Belarus | 39:50 |
| 113 | Gabriel Mazimpaka | Rwanda | 39:53 |
| 114 | Toni Bernadó | Andorra | 39:54 |
| 115 | Ademir da Silva | Brazil | 39:58 |
| 116 | Scott MacDonald | Canada | 40:03 |
| 117 | K.M. Chinnappa | India | 40:03 |
| 118 | Yoji Yamaguchi | Japan | 40:06 |
| 119 | Mohamed Suleiman | Qatar | 40:09 |
| 120 | José Alberto Montenegro | Argentina | 40:09 |
| 121 | Sipho Dlamini | Eswatini | 40:11 |
| 122 | David Milne | Canada | 40:12 |
| 123 | Santtu Mäkinen | Finland | 40:21 |
| 124 | Stan Rijken | Netherlands | 40:27 |
| 125 | Yam Bahadur Pudasaini | Nepal | 40:30 |
| 126 | José Macias | Mexico | 40:35 |
| 127 | Darwan Singh | India | 41:01 |
| 128 | Igor Salamun | Slovenia | 41:15 |
| 129 | Nazirdin Akylbekov | Kyrgyzstan | 41:15 |
| 130 | Parakhat Kurtgeldiyev | Turkmenistan | 41:17 |
| 131 | Washington Tenorio | Ecuador | 41:25 |
| 132 | Hussein Awada | Lebanon | 41:25 |
| 133 | Joze Ceh | Slovenia | 41:27 |
| 134 | Ivan Kibiryov | Uzbekistan | 41:28 |
| 135 | Nader Al-Nasry | Palestine | 41:36 |
| 136 | Josep Sansa | Andorra | 41:36 |
| 137 | Sergey Zabavskiy | Tajikistan | 41:37 |
| 138 | Ali Awad | Lebanon | 41:40 |
| 139 | Khasan Rakhimov | Uzbekistan | 41:53 |
| 140 | Dashrath Tigga | India | 41:55 |
| 141 | Ahmed El Bahnasawy | Egypt | 42:01 |
| 142 | Mehdi Chebli | Lebanon | 42:04 |
| 143 | Ghirma Woldu | Eritrea | 42:12 |
| 144 | Djamched Rasulov | Tajikistan | 42:33 |
| 145 | António Zeferino | Cape Verde | 42:40 |
| 146 | Vladimir Checha | Belarus | 42:43 |
| 147 | Sokhibdjan Sharipov | Tajikistan | 42:53 |
| 148 | Cesar Condori | Bolivia | 42:58 |
| 149 | Richard Muscat | Gibraltar | 43:26 |
| 150 | Andrey Lavrinovich | Belarus | 43:36 |
| 151 | Chokirjon Irmatov | Tajikistan | 43:50 |
| 152 | Omar Abdel Latif | Lebanon | 44:28 |
| 153 | Michael Breed | Gibraltar | 44:38 |
| 154 | Aleksandr Aniskevich | Belarus | 45:04 |
| 155 | Timur Asanov | Uzbekistan | 45:16 |
| 156 | Serdar Gandymov | Turkmenistan | 45:37 |
| 157 | Rinat Ablyayev | Uzbekistan | 46:06 |
| 158 | Christopher Walker | Gibraltar | 46:48 |
| 159 | Louis Chichon | Gibraltar | 47:28 |
| 160 | Derek Hernández | Gibraltar | 49:30 |
| — | Leszek Bebło | Poland | DNF |
| — | Antonio Silio | Argentina | DNF |
| — | Abderrahim Goumri | Morocco | DNF |
| — | Ihab Salama | Palestine | DNF |
| — | Abdelkrim Benzai | Algeria | DNF |
| — | Craig Kirkwood | New Zealand | DNF |
| — | Richard Tremain | Canada | DNF |
| — | Juuso Rainio | Finland | DNF |
| — | Sigurd Haveland | Gibraltar | DNF |
| — | Artyom Tetenkin | Kyrgyzstan | DNF |
| — | Othman Sulaiman | Qatar | DNF |
| — | Graham Cocksedge | Canada | DNS |
| — | Jafar Babakhani | Iran | DNS |
| — | Mohammed S.M. Albayed | Palestine | DNS |
| — | Abdal Salam Aldabaji | Palestine | DNS |
| — | Patrick Ishyaka | Rwanda | DNS |
| — | Alphonse Munyeshyaka | Rwanda | DNS |
| — | Dovletmammet Nazarov | Turkmenistan | DNS |
| — | Timothy Hacker | United States | DNS |

==== Teams ====
| Rank | Team | Points |
|---|---|---|
| 1st place, gold medalist(s) | Kenya: Paul Tergat / 3; Patrick Ivuti / 4; Wilberforce Talel / 5; Paul Koech / 6; (Charles Kamathi) / (7); (Abraham Cherono) / (11) | 18 |
| 2nd place, silver medalist(s) | Ethiopia: Assefa Mezegebu / 2; Lemma Alemayehu / 16; Tesfaye Tola / 23; Amebesse Tolossa / 27; (Dereje Tadesse) / (44); (Debebe Demisse) / (74) | 68 |
| 3rd place, bronze medalist(s) | Portugal: Eduardo Henriques / 10; Domingos Castro / 12; António Pinto / 22; Paulo Guerra / 25; (Alfredo Bráz) / (56); (Alberto Maravilha) / (65) | 69 |
| 4 | Spain: Enrique Molina / 17; Javier Cortés / 19; José Manuel Martínez / 21; Alberto García / 29; (Alejandro Gómez) / (40); (Teodoro Cuñado) / (51) | 86 |
| 5 | Tanzania: Zebedayo Bayo / 14; John Nada Saya / 15; Wilbroad Axweso / 30; Benedict Ako / 35; (Andrew Panga) / (63) | 94 |
| 6 | United Kingdom: Karl Keska / 13; Glynn Tromans / 34; Matt O'Dowd / 47; Jon Wild / 62; (Nick Comerford) / (88); (Rob Denmark) / (107) | 156 |
| 7 | Italy: Rachid Berradi / 32; Vincenzo Modica / 41; Simone Zanon / 42; Marco Mazza / 48; (Roberto Antonelli) / (70); (Angelo Carosi) / (79) | 163 |
| 8 | Algeria: Samir Moussaoui / 20; Kamel Kohil / 46; Mohamed Driouche / 49; Djamel Selatnia / 52; (Tayeb Kalloud) / (96); (Abdelkrim Benzai) / (DNF) | 167 |
| 9 | Morocco: Mustapha Bamouh / 24; Saïd Berrioui / 38; Abdelhadi Habassa / 39; Lahcen Benyoussef / 66; (Abderrahim Goumri) / (DNF) | 167 |
| 10 | Zambia: Venry Hamalila / 18; Sam Mwape / 37; Obed Mutanya / 53; Medison Chibwe / 75 | 183 |
| 11 | United States: Meb Keflezighi / 26; Abdi Abdirahman / 45; Brad Hauser / 58; Peter Sherry / 67; (Nick Rogers) / (76) | 196 |
| 12 | Belgium: Mohammed Mourhit / 1; Stefan Van Den Broek / 54; Tom van Hooste / 86; Jerry van den Eede / 105 | 246 |
| 13 | Russia: Sergey Lukin / 43; Sergey Fedotov / 68; Mikhail Minyukhin / 78; Dmitriy Maksimov / 87 | 276 |
| 14 | Rwanda: Mathias Ntawulikura / 31; Joseph Nsengiyumya / 60; Pacifique Ayabusa / 84; Gabriel Mazimpaka / 113 | 288 |
| 15 | Qatar: Khamis Abdulla Saifeldin / 55; Ahmed Ibrahim Warsama / 57; Ahmed Adam Saleh / 82; Jamal Abdi Hassan / 109; (Mohamed Suleiman) / (119); (Othman Sulaiman) / (DNF) | 303 |
| 16 | Ireland: Peter Matthews / 72; Noel Berkeley / 73; Cian McLoughlin / 77; Dermot Donnelly / 83; (Paolo Doglio) / (89); (Seamus Power) / (101) | 305 |
| 17 | Brazil: Benedito Gomes / 64; Wellington Fraga / 71; Aleudo dos Santos / 102; Ademir da Silva / 115 | 352 |
| 18 | Finland: Ville Hautala / 94; Jussi Utriainen / 95; Pasi Mattila / 99; Santtu Mäkinen / 123; (Juuso Rainio) / (DNF) | 411 |
| 19 | Canada: Faizal Emamaullee / 90; Steve Lawrence / 98; Scott MacDonald / 116; David Milne / 122; (Richard Tremain) / (DNF) | 426 |
| 20 | Ecuador: Richard Arias / 92; Vladimir Guerra / 106; Néstor Quinapanta / 108; Washington Tenorio / 131 | 437 |
| 21 | India: Shesh Mani / 111; K.M. Chinnappa / 117; Darwan Singh / 127; Dashrath Tigga / 140 | 495 |
| 22 | Belarus: Zarislav Gapeyenko / 112; Vladimir Checha / 146; Andrey Lavrinovich / 150; Aleksandr Aniskevich / 154 | 562 |
| 23 | Lebanon: Hussein Awada / 132; Ali Awad / 138; Mehdi Chebli / 142; Omar Abdel Latif / 152 | 564 |
| 24 | Tajikistan: Sergey Zabavskiy / 137; Djamched Rasulov / 144; Sokhibdjan Sharipov / 147; Chokirjon Irmatov / 151 | 579 |
| 25 | Uzbekistan: Ivan Kibiryov / 134; Khasan Rakhimov / 139; Timur Asanov / 155; Rinat Ablyayev / 157 | 585 |
| 26 | Gibraltar: Richard Muscat / 149; Michael Breed / 153; Christopher Walker / 158; Louis Chichon / 159; (Derek Hernández) / (160); (Sigurd Haveland) / (DNF) | 619 |

- Note: Athletes in parentheses did not score for the team result

== Participation ==
An unofficial count yields the participation of 171 athletes from 54 countries in the Senior men's race. The announced athlete from Iran did not show.

- Algeria (6)
- Andorra (2)
- Argentina (2)
- Belarus (4)
- Belgium (4)
- Bolivia (1)
- Brazil (4)
- Burundi (1)
- Canada (5)
- Cape Verde (1)
- Chile (1)
- Denmark (1)
- Ecuador (4)
- Egypt (2)
- Eritrea (3)
- Ethiopia (6)
- Finland (5)
- France (1)
- Gibraltar (6)
- India (4)
- Ireland (6)
- Italy (6)
- Japan (3)
- Kazakhstan (1)
- Kenya (6)
- Kyrgyzstan (2)
- Lebanon (4)
- Lesotho (1)
- Mexico (2)
- Morocco (5)
- Nepal (1)
- Netherlands (2)
- New Zealand (2)
- Palestine (2)
- Poland (1)
- Portugal (6)
- Qatar (6)
- Russia (4)
- Rwanda (4)
- Slovakia (1)
- Slovenia (2)
- South Africa (1)
- Spain (6)
- Eswatini (1)
- Sweden (1)
- Tajikistan (4)
- Tanzania (5)
- Turkmenistan (2)
- Ukraine (1)
- United Kingdom (6)
- United States (5)
- Uzbekistan (4)
- Zambia (4)
- Zimbabwe (1)

== See also ==
- 2000 IAAF World Cross Country Championships – Men's short race
- 2000 IAAF World Cross Country Championships – Junior men's race
- 2000 IAAF World Cross Country Championships – Senior women's race
- 2000 IAAF World Cross Country Championships – Women's short race
- 2000 IAAF World Cross Country Championships – Junior women's race
