= 2000 IAAF World Cross Country Championships – Junior men's race =

Junior men's race at the 2000 IAAF World Cross Country Championships
- Organisers: IAAF
- Edition: 28th
- Date: March 19
- Host city: Vilamoura, Algarve, Portugal
- Venue: Sporting Complex of Vilamoura
- Events: 1
- Distances: 8.08 km – Junior men
- Participation: 162 athletes from 43 nations

The Junior men's race at the 2000 IAAF World Cross Country Championships was held at the Sporting Complex in Vilamoura, Portugal, on March 19, 2000. Reports of the event were given in The New York Times, in the Glasgow Herald, and for the IAAF.

Complete results for individuals, for teams, medallists, and the results of British athletes who took part were published.

== Race results ==
=== Junior men's race (8.08 km) ===
==== Individual ====
Rank	Athlete	Country	Time
1st place, gold medalist(s)	Robert Kipchumba	Kenya	22:49
2nd place, silver medalist(s)	Duncan Lebo	Kenya	22:52
3rd place, bronze medalist(s)	John Cheruiyot Korir	Kenya	22:55
4	Philemon Kemei	Kenya	23:04
5	Martin Sulle	Tanzania	23:14
6	Faustin Baha	Tanzania	23:27
7	Edwin Koech	Kenya	23:33
8	Beruk Debrework	Ethiopia	23:40
9	Teref Dessalege	Ethiopia	23:51
10	Kiplimo Muneria	Kenya	24:03
11	Martin Toroitich	Uganda	24:08
12	Alemayehu Lema	Ethiopia	24:14
13	Aboubaker Kamal	Qatar	24:19
14	Masakazu Fujiwara	Japan	24:20
15	Paul Wakou	Uganda	24:23
16	Abdelkrim Kabbouri	Morocco	24:23
17	Abdulaziz Al-Ameri	Qatar	24:24
18	Midekssa Diriba	Ethiopia	24:24
19	Sivuyile Dlongwana	South Africa	24:27
20	Job Sikoria	Uganda	24:29
21	Aleksandr Sekletov	Russia	24:29
22	Johnny Okello	Uganda	24:29
23	Daniel Andrew Sipe	Tanzania	24:32
24	Khoudir Aggoune	Algeria	24:34
25	Mo Farah	United Kingdom	24:37
26	Abdelhakim Fahli	Morocco	24:38
27	Boniface Kiprop	Uganda	24:39
28	Franklin Sanchez	United States	24:45
29	Ridouane Harroufi	Morocco	24:52
30	Majid Aman Awadh	Qatar	24:54
31	Demissie Girma	Ethiopia	24:54
32	Sandile Lembetha	South Africa	24:56
33	Yoshihiro Murata	Japan	24:57
34	Aissam Gtaib	Morocco	24:58
35	Malik Balhoul	France	24:59
36	Masaru Takamizawa	Japan	25:02
37	Louis Luchini	United States	25:09
38	Jamal Noor	Qatar	25:11
39	Rabah Aboud	Algeria	25:11
40	Chad Pearson	United States	25:13
41	Chris Thompson	United Kingdom	25:14
42	Shuichi Fujii	Japan	25:15
43	Nebay Habtegiorgis	Eritrea	25:17
44	Abdelatif Chemlal	Morocco	25:19
45	Friedel Maans	South Africa	25:20
46	Ionut Bura	Romania	25:22
47	Ryuji Sorayama	Japan	25:23
48	Gunnars Osmundsen	Norway	25:25
49	Robert Maycock	United Kingdom	25:25
50	Elias Daudi	Tanzania	25:27
51	James Vidal	Colombia	25:27
52	Bruno Silva	Portugal	25:30
53	Aleksandr Orlov	Russia	25:31
54	Aleksandr Sergeyev	Russia	25:31
55	Jeffrey Gwebu	South Africa	25:34
56	Bencherki Kafkaf	Algeria	25:35
57	Tarek Boukensa	Algeria	25:36
58	Guillaume Eraud	France	25:39
59	Andrey Khramov	Russia	25:40
60	Abderrezak Bahat	Algeria	25:41
61	Mahmoud Deria	Qatar	25:43
62	José Abascal	Spain	25:45
63	Adelino Monteiro	Portugal	25:46
64	Naoto Kato	Japan	25:49
65	Tadesse Feyissa	Ethiopia	25:49
66	Jason Hartmann	United States	25:50
67	Benoit Charpantier	France	25:51
68	Jonathan Monje	Chile	25:52
69	Hugo Silveira	Portugal	25:53
70	Yannick Cloux	Belgium	25:55
71	Mark Smyth	Ireland	25:56
72	Hakim Mokhtari	France	25:57
73	Krijn Van Koolwyk	Belgium	25:59
74	Cesar Pilaluisa	Ecuador	25:59
75	Roberto González	Spain	26:00
76	Selim Issaoui	Tunisia	26:01
77	Vitaliy Moroz	Belarus	26:01
78	Matthew Spring	United States	26:02
79	Stefan Beumer	Netherlands	26:03
80	Lorenzo Perrone	Italy	26:04
81	Angel Campos	Ecuador	26:04
82	Gaym Berhane	Eritrea	26:04
83	Ala Al-Sakkaf	Yemen	26:06
84	Juan Martínez	Spain	26:07
85	Ali Tachour	Algeria	26:08
86	Esmail Al-Dawla	Yemen	26:08
87	Byron Piedra	Ecuador	26:09
88	João Nunes	Portugal	26:12
89	Andrea Sorgato	Italy	26:13
90	Patrick Stitzinger	Netherlands	26:15
91	Ryan Hayden	Canada	26:15
92	Victor Ocampo	Colombia	26:16
93	Simon Bairu	Canada	26:16
94	Jaime Baquero	Colombia	26:16
95	Mohamed Abu Hassira	Palestine	26:19
96	Luigi La Bella	Italy	26:19
97	Nélson Oliveira	Portugal	26:20
98	Valerio Gulli	Italy	26:21
99	Farid Kebaili	France	26:24
100	Cosimo Caliandro	Italy	26:28
101	Paul Shaw	United Kingdom	26:29
102	David Solis	Spain	26:29
103	Andrew Alley	Canada	26:33
104	Moses Faku	South Africa	26:35
105	Mirko Petrović	Yugoslavia	26:36
106	Salah Juaim	Yemen	26:37
107	Ahmed Hussein	Egypt	26:38
108	Koen Wilssens	Belgium	26:40
109	Sergey Denis	Belarus	26:41
110	Brandon Young	Canada	26:42
111	Andy Sherman	United Kingdom	26:42
112	Rui Silva	Portugal	26:46
113	Henrik Ahnström	Sweden	26:47
114	Ayad Lamdassam	Morocco	26:51
115	Abraham Gebreigziabhier	Eritrea	26:51
116	Nick McCormick	United Kingdom	26:54
117	Mike Thorson	Canada	26:55
118	Ingemund Askeland	Norway	27:01
119	Tom van Rooy	Belgium	27:04
120	José Luis Santos	Mexico	27:07
121	Martin Fagan	Ireland	27:08
122	Barend Derriks	Netherlands	27:09
123	Cristian Gaeta	Italy	27:09
124	Aleksey Volkov	Belarus	27:10
125	Mesías Zapata	Ecuador	27:14
126	Santiago Curto	Spain	27:24
127	Patrick Guidera	Ireland	27:26
128	Andrey Pleskach	Turkmenistan	27:27
129	Umit Koclardan	Turkey	27:34
130	Mark Pacqué	Netherlands	27:35
131	Andrew Hill	United States	27:35
132	Thomas Frazier	Ireland	27:42
133	Damien Derobert	France	27:43
134	Borut Veber	Slovenia	27:49
135	Robert Connolly	Ireland	27:55
136	Awadh Al-Sakkaf	Yemen	28:00
137	Yamil Iskanderov	Azerbaijan	28:03
138	Nozimjon Irmatov	Tajikistan	28:06
139	Anis Ltifi	Tunisia	28:08
140	Dmitriy Posled	Belarus	28:20
141	Rasul Saydaliyev	Uzbekistan	28:22
142	Meretdurdy Kereguliev	Turkmenistan	28:36
143	Sodir Nabiyev	Uzbekistan	28:42
144	Khodor Abdou	Lebanon	28:48
145	Will Thrift	Canada	28:55
146	Dario Nemec	Croatia	29:07
147	Jahongir Tolibjonov	Uzbekistan	29:07
148	Boris Spes	Slovenia	29:25
149	Roy Bilan	Lebanon	30:05
150	Jacques Francis	Lebanon	30:05
151	Rami Karlas	Lebanon	30:06
152	Ruslan Kurbanov	Turkmenistan	30:13
153	Helal Essa Saeed	Qatar	30:37
154	Yevgeniy Trusov	Uzbekistan	30:42
155	Sopy Ashyrov	Turkmenistan	31:45
156	Michael Sanchez	Gibraltar	32:40
157	Timothy Garcia	Gibraltar	33:02
158	Lee Taylor	Gibraltar	33:21
159	Dominic Carroll	Gibraltar	34:55
—	Jaihson Caucali	Colombia	DNF
—	Job Dusch	Netherlands	DNF
—	José Moreno	Spain	DNF
—	Sergio de León Solís	Guatemala	DNS
—	Gonzalo Iquite	Guatemala	DNS
—	Francisco José Sáenz	Guatemala	DNS
—	Víctor Jacobo Solís	Guatemala	DNS
—	Chithu Kumar	India	DNS
—	Ajith Singh	India	DNS
—	Joga Singh	India	DNS
—	R. Yalappa	India	DNS

==== Teams ====
Rank	Team	Points
1st place, gold medalist(s)	Kenya: Robert Kipchumba / 1; Duncan Lebo / 2; John Cheruiyot Korir / 3; Philemon Kemei / 4; (Edwin Koech) / (7); (Kiplimo Muneria) / (10)	10
2nd place, silver medalist(s)	Ethiopia: Beruk Debrework / 8; Teref Dessalege / 9; Alemayehu Lema / 12; Midekssa Diriba / 18; (Demissie Girma) / (31); (Tadesse Feyissa) / (65)	47
3rd place, bronze medalist(s)	Uganda: Martin Toroitich / 11; Paul Wakou / 15; Job Sikoria / 20; Johnny Okello / 22; (Boniface Kiprop) / (27)	68
4	Tanzania: Martin Sulle / 5; Faustin Baha / 6; Daniel Andrew Sipe / 23; Elias Daudi / 50	84
5	Qatar: Aboubaker Kamal / 13; Abdulaziz Al-Ameri / 17; Majid Aman Awadh / 30; Jamal Noor / 38; (Mahmoud Deria) / (61); (Helal Essa Saeed) / (153)	98
6	Morocco: Abdelkrim Kabbouri / 16; Abdelhakim Fahli / 26; Ridouane Harroufi / 29; Aissam Gtaib / 34; (Abdelatif Chemlal) / (44); (Ayad Lamdassam) / (114)	105
7	Japan: Masakazu Fujiwara / 14; Yoshihiro Murata / 33; Masaru Takamizawa / 36; Shuichi Fujii / 42; (Ryuji Sorayama) / (47); (Naoto Kato) / (64)	125
8	South Africa: Sivuyile Dlongwana / 19; Sandile Lembetha / 32; Friedel Maans / 45; Jeffrey Gwebu / 55; (Moses Faku) / (104)	151
9	United States: Franklin Sanchez / 28; Louis Luchini / 37; Chad Pearson / 40; Jason Hartmann / 66; (Matthew Spring) / (78); (Andrew Hill) / (131)	171
10	Algeria: Khoudir Aggoune / 24; Rabah Aboud / 39; Bencherki Kafkaf / 56; Tarek Boukensa / 57; (Abderrezak Bahat) / (60); (Ali Tachour) / (85)	176
11	Russia: Aleksandr Sekletov / 21; Aleksandr Orlov / 53; Aleksandr Sergeyev / 54; Andrey Khramov / 59	187
12	United Kingdom: Mo Farah / 25; Chris Thompson / 41; Robert Maycock / 49; Paul Shaw / 101; (Andy Sherman) / (111); (Nick McCormick) / (116)	216
13	France: Malik Balhoul / 35; Guillaume Eraud / 58; Benoit Charpantier / 67; Hakim Mokhtari / 72; (Farid Kebaili) / (99); (Damien Derobert) / (133)	232
14	Portugal: Bruno Silva / 52; Adelino Monteiro / 63; Hugo Silveira / 69; João Nunes / 88; (Nélson Oliveira) / (97); (Rui Silva) / (112)	272
15	Spain: José Abascal / 62; Roberto González / 75; Juan Martínez / 84; David Solis / 102; (Santiago Curto) / (126); (José Moreno) / (DNF)	323
16	Italy: Lorenzo Perrone / 80; Andrea Sorgato / 89; Luigi La Bella / 96; Valerio Gulli / 98; (Cosimo Caliandro) / (100); (Cristian Gaeta) / (123)	363
17	Ecuador: Cesar Pilaluisa / 74; Angel Campos / 81; Byron Piedra / 87; Mesias Zapata / 125	367
18	Belgium: Yannick Cloux / 70; Krijn Van Koolwyk / 73; Koen Wilssens / 108; Tom van Rooy / 119	370
19	Canada: Ryan Hayden / 91; Simon Bairu / 93; Andrew Alley / 103; Brandon Young / 110; (Mike Thorson) / (117); (Will Thrift) / (145)	397
20	Yemen: Ala Al-Sakkaf / 83; Esmail Al-Dawla / 86; Salah Juaim / 106; Awadh Al-Sakkaf / 136	411
21	Netherlands: Stefan Beumer / 79; Patrick Stitzinger / 90; Barend Derriks / 122; Mark Pacqué / 130; (Job Dusch) / (DNF)	421
22	Belarus: Vitaliy Moroz / 77; Sergey Denis / 109; Aleksey Volkov / 124; Dmitriy Posled / 140	450
23	Ireland: Mark Smyth / 71; Martin Fagan / 121; Patrick Guidera / 127; Thomas Frazier / 132; (Robert Connolly) / (135)	451
24	Turkmenistan: Andrey Pleskach / 128; Meretdurdy Kereguliev / 142; Ruslan Kurbanov / 152; Sopy Ashyrov / 155	577
25	Uzbekistan: Rasul Saydaliyev / 141; Sodir Nabiyev / 143; Jahongir Tolibjonov / 147; Yevgeniy Trusov / 154	585
26	Lebanon: Khodor Abdou / 144; Roy Bilan / 149; Jacques Francis / 150; Rami Karlas / 151	594
27	Gibraltar: Michael Sanchez / 156; Timothy Garcia / 157; Lee Taylor / 158; Dominic Carroll / 159	630
DNF	Colombia: (James Vidal) / (51); (Victor Ocampo) / (92); (Jaime Baquero) / (94); (Jaihson Caucali) / (DNF)	DNF

- Note: Athletes in parentheses did not score for the team result

== Participation ==
An unofficial count yields the participation of 162 athletes from 43 countries in the Junior men's race. This is in agreement with the official numbers as published. The announced athletes from Guatemala and India did not show.

- Algeria (6)
- Azerbaijan (1)
- Belarus (4)
- Belgium (4)
- Canada (6)
- Chile (1)
- Colombia (4)
- Croatia (1)
- Ecuador (4)
- Egypt (1)
- Eritrea (3)
- Ethiopia (6)
- France (6)
- Gibraltar (4)
- Ireland (5)
- Italy (6)
- Japan (6)
- Kenya (6)
- Lebanon (4)
- Mexico (1)
- Morocco (6)
- Netherlands (5)
- Norway (2)
- Palestine (1)
- Portugal (6)
- Qatar (6)
- Romania (1)
- Russia (4)
- Slovenia (2)
- South Africa (5)
- Spain (6)
- Sweden (1)
- Tajikistan (1)
- Tanzania (4)
- Tunisia (2)
- Turkey (1)
- Turkmenistan (4)
- Uganda (5)
- United Kingdom (6)
- United States (6)
- Uzbekistan (4)
- Yemen (4)
- Yugoslavia (1)

== See also ==
- 2000 IAAF World Cross Country Championships – Senior men's race
- 2000 IAAF World Cross Country Championships – Men's short race
- 2000 IAAF World Cross Country Championships – Senior women's race
- 2000 IAAF World Cross Country Championships – Women's short race
- 2000 IAAF World Cross Country Championships – Junior women's race
