= 2000 IAAF World Cross Country Championships – Junior women's race =

Junior women's race at the 2000 IAAF World Cross Country Championships
- Organisers: IAAF
- Edition: 28th
- Date: March 18
- Host city: Vilamoura, Algarve, Portugal
- Venue: Sporting Complex of Vilamoura
- Events: 1
- Distances: 6.29 km – Junior women
- Participation: 131 athletes from 36 nations

The Junior women's race at the 2000 IAAF World Cross Country Championships was held at the Sporting Complex in Vilamoura, Portugal, on March 18, 2000. Reports on the event were given in The New York Times, in the Glasgow Herald, and for the IAAF.

Complete results for individuals, for teams, medallists, and the results of British athletes who took part were published.

== Race results ==
=== Junior women's race (6.29 km) ===
==== Individual ====
Rank	Athlete	Country	Time
1st place, gold medalist(s)	Vivian Cheruiyot	Kenya	20:34
2nd place, silver medalist(s)	Alice Timbilil	Kenya	20:35
3rd place, bronze medalist(s)	Viola Kibiwott	Kenya	20:36
4	Hareg Sidelil	Ethiopia	20:38
5	Merima Hashim	Ethiopia	20:41
6	Fridah Domongole	Kenya	20:43
7	Eyerusalem Kuma	Ethiopia	20:45
8	Abebech Nigussie	Ethiopia	20:48
9	Worknesh Kidane	Ethiopia	20:52
10	Dorcus Inzikuru	Uganda	21:02
11	Rina Fujioka	Japan	21:12
12	Pamela Kipchoge	Kenya	21:19
13	Bezunesh Bekele	Ethiopia	21:20
14	Kaori Yoshida	Japan	21:26
15	Carol Henry	Canada	21:36
16	Yolandi Neuhoff	South Africa	21:38
17	Jane Makombe	Zimbabwe	21:42
18	Diane Nukuri	Burundi	21:42
19	Lina Usmanova	Russia	21:44
20	Tomomi Tagao	Japan	21:50
21	Valentina Zevushkina	Russia	21:53
22	Hawa Hamis Hussein	Tanzania	21:55
23	Elaine du Plessis	South Africa	21:56
24	Lize-Mari Venter	South Africa	21:57
25	Mary Bacia	Uganda	22:04
26	Lauren Fleshman	United States	22:08
27	Hana Chaouach	Tunisia	22:09
28	Mia Larsson	Sweden	22:09
29	Shalane Flanagan	United States	22:10
30	Erin Sullivan	United States	22:12
31	Hakima Takeznount	Algeria	22:13
32	Jéssica Augusto	Portugal	22:15
33	Ikuko Nagao	Japan	22:18
34	Gladys Ruto	Kenya	22:19
35	Lyudmila Volchek	Belarus	22:22
36	Nassira Taibi	Algeria	22:28
37	Wahiba Ifftissen	Algeria	22:29
38	Grace Chesang	Uganda	22:30
39	Linda Hadjar	France	22:30
40	Siphuluwazi Sibindi	Zimbabwe	22:31
41	Irene Alfonso	Spain	22:32
42	Linda Roets	South Africa	22:33
43	Malika Asahssah	Morocco	22:35
44	Ida Nilsson	Sweden	22:39
45	Clemantine Nyiraguhirwa	Rwanda	22:42
46	Habiba Ghribi	Tunisia	22:42
47	Nicola Spirig	Switzerland	22:42
48	Lucélia Peres	Brazil	22:43
49	Riina Tolonen	Finland	22:43
50	Mami Ikeda	Japan	22:44
51	Fatiha Bahi	Algeria	22:49
52	Cindy Durocher	Canada	22:49
53	Nikki Reckman	Canada	22:54
54	Xenia Luxem	Belgium	22:55
55	Henrietta Freeman	United Kingdom	22:56
56	Anastasiya Starovoytova	Belarus	22:59
57	Minna Nummela	Finland	23:01
58	Catherine Webombesa	Uganda	23:04
59	Mebarka Zellit	Algeria	23:05
60	Letitia Pheleu	South Africa	23:06
61	Sheela Agrawal	United States	23:07
62	Tatiane Sá	Brazil	23:08
63	Emma Ward	United Kingdom	23:09
64	Emily Kroshus	Canada	23:12
65	Amal Essaki	Morocco	23:13
66	Collette Fagan	United Kingdom	23:14
67	Simret Sultan	Eritrea	23:15
68	Kate Bradshaw	United States	23:16
69	Patrícia Pereira	Portugal	23:17
70	Sigrid van den Bempt	Belgium	23:17
71	Marina Ivanova	Russia	23:18
72	Sonia Bejarano	Spain	23:18
73	Anzhelika Simon	Russia	23:21
74	Valeria Marinoni	Italy	23:23
75	Kate Reed	United Kingdom	23:24
76	Mercedes Aguilar	Colombia	23:26
77	Khadija Nadari	Morocco	23:31
78	Mieke Geens	Belgium	23:37
79	Michelle Carson	Canada	23:38
80	Émilie Mondor	Canada	23:38
81	Mirjana Kalajdzic	Yugoslavia	23:39
82	Filipa Coelho	Portugal	23:40
83	Simret Asmerom	Eritrea	23:41
84	Jane Potter	United Kingdom	23:44
85	Olga Goncharuk	Belarus	23:46
86	Valquíria Santos	Brazil	23:50
87	Rosana Fernández	Spain	23:55
88	Marina Munćan	Yugoslavia	24:06
89	Fatima Lahssini	Morocco	24:07
90	Rosário Pais	Portugal	24:10
91	Veerle Demuynck	Belgium	24:12
92	Anni Tuimala	Finland	24:13
93	Irina Kunakhavets	Belarus	24:13
94	Alma Xicotencatl	Mexico	24:15
95	Zoe Jelbert	United Kingdom	24:19
96	Renata Fernandes	Portugal	24:21
97	Paz Rodríguez	Spain	24:22
98	Martha Ronceria	Colombia	24:23
99	Vanesse van Voskuilen	Netherlands	24:26
100	Yelena Kalinenko	Kazakhstan	24:38
101	Ulla Tuimala	Finland	24:49
102	Jennifer Garzón	Colombia	24:50
103	Ana Pérez	Spain	24:55
104	Loyce Adiru	Uganda	24:57
105	Yuliya Alyoshina	Turkmenistan	24:57
106	Luisa Jiménez	Colombia	24:58
107	Preda Sreedharan	India	25:03
108	Dina Mijuskovic	Croatia	25:05
109	Diana Martín	Spain	25:11
110	Dulce Félix	Portugal	25:13
111	Sihem Mekni	Tunisia	25:16
112	Lamiae Omari	Morocco	25:26
113	Hayet Ferahtia	Algeria	25:27
114	Sonia Boubaker	Tunisia	25:29
115	Adriana da Silva	Brazil	25:37
116	Besma Mekki	Tunisia	25:49
117	Aleksandra Rodigina	Uzbekistan	26:40
118	Dildar Mamedova	Turkmenistan	26:40
119	Yuliya Krepina	Uzbekistan	26:42
120	Kristina Medyanskaya	Uzbekistan	26:45
121	Kamilla Ramazanova	Uzbekistan	26:51
122	Anna Markelova	Turkmenistan	26:51
123	Ancy Scaria	India	27:06
124	Vaishali Chatare	India	27:12
125	Jishy Joseph	India	27:14
126	Julie Spolidoro	United States	27:47
127	Leyla Dzhumayeva	Turkmenistan	29:02
—	Btissam Lakhouad	Morocco	DNF
—	Tausi Juma	Tanzania	DNF
—	Peudo Japhet	Tanzania	DNF
—	Naoko Sakata	Japan	DNF
—	Olga Mariela Das Morales	Guatemala	DNS

==== Teams ====
Rank	Team	Points
1st place, gold medalist(s)	Kenya: Vivian Cheruiyot / 1; Alice Timbilil / 2; Viola Kibiwott / 3; Fridah Domongole / 6; (Pamela Kipchoge) / (12); (Gladys Ruto) / (34)	12
2nd place, silver medalist(s)	Ethiopia: Hareg Sidelil / 4; Merima Hashim / 5; Eyerusalem Kuma / 7; Abebech Nigussie / 8; (Worknesh Kidane) / (9); (Bezunesh Bekele) / (13)	24
3rd place, bronze medalist(s)	Japan: Rina Fujioka / 11; Kaori Yoshida / 14; Tomomi Tagao / 20; Ikuko Nagao / 33; (Mami Ikeda) / (50); (Naoko Sakata) / (DNF)	78
4	South Africa: Yolandi Neuhoff / 16; Elaine du Plessis / 23; Lize-Mari Venter / 24; Linda Roets / 42; (Letitia Pheleu) / (60)	105
5	Uganda: Dorcus Inzikuru / 10; Mary Bacia / 25; Grace Chesang / 38; Catherine Webombesa / 58; (Loyce Adiru) / (104)	131
6	United States: Lauren Fleshman / 26; Shalane Flanagan / 29; Erin Sullivan / 30; Sheela Agrawal / 61; (Kate Bradshaw) / (68); (Julie Spolidoro) / (126)	146
7	Algeria: Hakima Takeznount / 31; Nassira Taibi / 36; Wahiba Ifftissen / 37; Fatiha Bahi / 51; (Mebarka Zellit) / (59); (Hayet Ferahtia) / (113)	155
8	Canada: Carol Henry / 15; Cindy Durocher / 52; Nikki Reckman / 53; Emily Kroshus / 64; (Michelle Carson) / (79); (Émilie Mondor) / (80)	184
9	Russia: Lina Usmanova / 19; Valentina Zevushkina / 21; Marina Ivanova / 71; Anzhelika Simon / 73	184
10	United Kingdom: Henrietta Freeman / 55; Emma Ward / 63; Collette Fagan / 66; Kate Reed / 75; (Jane Potter) / (84); (Zoe Jelbert) / (95)	259
11	Belarus: Lyudmila Volchek / 35; Anastasiya Starovoytova / 56; Olga Goncharuk / 85; Irina Kunakhavets / 93	269
12	Portugal: Jéssica Augusto / 32; Patrícia Pereira / 69; Filipa Coelho / 82; Rosário Pais / 90; (Renata Fernandes) / (96); (Dulce Félix) / (110)	273
13	Morocco: Malika Asahssah / 43; Amal Essaki / 65; Khadija Nadari / 77; Fatima Lahssini / 89; (Lamiae Omari) / (112); (Btissam Lakhouad) / (DNF)	274
14	Belgium: Xenia Luxem / 54; Sigrid van den Bempt / 70; Mieke Geens / 78; Veerle Demuynck / 91	293
15	Spain: Irene Alfonso / 41; Sonia Bejarano / 72; Rosana Fernández / 87; Paz Rodríguez / 97; (Ana Pérez) / (103); (Diana Martín) / (109)	297
16	Tunisia: Hana Chaouach / 27; Habiba Ghribi / 46; Sihem Mekni / 111; Sonia Boubaker / 114; (Besma Mekki) / (116)	298
17	Finland: Riina Tolonen / 49; Minna Nummela / 57; Anni Tuimala / 92; Ulla Tuimala / 101	299
18	Brazil: Lucélia Peres / 48; Tatiane Sá / 62; Valquíria Santos / 86; Adriana da Silva / 115	311
19	Colombia: Mercedes Aguilar / 76; Martha Ronceria / 98; Jennifer Garzón / 102; Luisa Jiménez / 106	382
20	Turkmenistan: Yuliya Alyoshina / 105; Dildar Mamedova / 118; Anna Markelova / 122; Leyla Dzhumayeva / 127	472
21	Uzbekistan: Aleksandra Rodigina / 117; Yuliya Krepina / 119; Kristina Medyanskaya / 120; Kamilla Ramazanova / 121	477
22	India: Preda Sreedharan / 107; Ancy Scaria / 123; Vaishali Chatare / 124; Jishy Joseph / 125	479

- Note: Athletes in parentheses did not score for the team result

== Participation ==
An unofficial count yields the participation of 131 athletes from 36 countries in the Junior women's race. This is in agreement with the official numbers as published. The announced athlete from Guatemala did not show.

- Algeria (6)
- Belarus (4)
- Belgium (4)
- Brazil (4)
- Burundi (1)
- Canada (6)
- Colombia (4)
- Croatia (1)
- Eritrea (2)
- Ethiopia (6)
- Finland (4)
- France (1)
- India (4)
- Italy (1)
- Japan (6)
- Kazakhstan (1)
- Kenya (6)
- Mexico (1)
- Morocco (6)
- Netherlands (1)
- Portugal (6)
- Russia (4)
- Rwanda (1)
- South Africa (5)
- Spain (6)
- Sweden (2)
- Switzerland (1)
- Tanzania (3)
- Tunisia (5)
- Turkmenistan (4)
- Uganda (5)
- United Kingdom (6)
- United States (6)
- Uzbekistan (4)
- Yugoslavia (2)
- Zimbabwe (2)

== See also ==
- 2000 IAAF World Cross Country Championships – Senior men's race
- 2000 IAAF World Cross Country Championships – Men's short race
- 2000 IAAF World Cross Country Championships – Junior men's race
- 2000 IAAF World Cross Country Championships – Senior women's race
- 2000 IAAF World Cross Country Championships – Women's short race
