= Athletics at the 1995 Summer Universiade – Men's 10,000 metres =

The men's 10,000 metres event at the 1995 Summer Universiade was held on 2 September at the Hakatanomori Athletic Stadium in Fukuoka, Japan.

== Results ==
| Rank | Athlete | Nationality | Time | Notes |
|---|---|---|---|---|
| 1st place, gold medalist(s) | Yasuyuki Watanabe | Japan | 28:47.78 | |
| 2nd place, silver medalist(s) | Stephen Mayaka | Kenya | 28:55.02 | |
| 3rd place, bronze medalist(s) | Gabino Apolonio | Mexico | 29:07.95 | |
| 4 | Masayuki Kobayashi | Japan | 29:34.62 | |
| 5 | José Dias | Portugal | 30:10.45 | |
| 6 | Phil Costley | New Zealand | 30:57.74 | |
| 7 | James Westphal | United States | 31:02.71 | |
| 8 | Solomon Wachira | Kenya | 31:08.72 | |
| 9 | Blair Martin | New Zealand | 31:19.30 | |
| 10 | Jeffrey Lockyer | Canada | 32:06.24 | |
| 11 | Fuad Obad | Yemen | 32:56.47 | |
| 12 | Elsidig Ibraim | Sudan | 35:12.82 | |
| | Sergey Fedotov | Russia | DNF | |
| | Khaled Al-Hada | Yemen | DNS | |
| | Adamou Aboubakar | Cameroon | DNS | |
| | Dashpurev Munkhbayar | Mongolia | DNS | |
| | Jan Pešava | Czech Republic | DNS | |
| | Sdjad-Hazave Hamid | Iran | DNS | |
| | Fatih Çintimar | Turkey | DNS | |
