= Sergey Fedotov (disambiguation) =

Sergey Fedotov is a Russian long distance runner.

Sergei Fedotov or Sergey Fedotov may also refer to:

- Sergei Fedotov, a member of Russian GRU Unit 29155 implicated in assassinations
- Sergey Fedotov (theatre director) (born 1961), Russian actor and theatre director
- Sergey Fedotov (seismologist) (1931–2019), Soviet and Russian volcanologist and seismologist
