= Saitama International Marathon =

- Date: December
- Location: Saitama, Japan
- Event type: Road
- Distance: Marathon
- Primary sponsor: Resona
- Established: 2015
- Course records: 2:23:18 (2016) (Kenya) Flomena Cheyech
- Website: Saitama Marathon
- Participants: 163 (2019)

The Saitama International Marathon is a women's marathon held in Saitama, Japan, and hosted by Japan Association of Athletics Federations, Saitama Prefecture, Saitama City, Nippon Television Network and the Yomiuri Shimbun. The event is an IAAF Silver Label Road Race.

The competition took the place of the Yokohama Women's Marathon which was held in Yokohama from 2009 until 2014 and itself a successor event to the Tokyo International Women's Marathon, which was held in Tokyo from 1979 until 2008. Following the creation of the annual Tokyo Marathon in 2007, which featured its own annual women's marathon, the sponsors decided to move the women's marathon to Yokohama in 2009 and then on to Saitama in 2015.

The first Saitama International Marathon held on 15 November 2015 also served as the selection race for Japan women's marathon representatives for 2016 Summer Olympics in Rio de Janeiro.

== Winners ==
Key: Course record

Edition	Year	Winner	Country	Time (m:s)	Runner-up	Country	Time (m:s)	Third place	Country	Time (m:s)
1st	2015	Atsede Baysa	Ethiopia	2:25:44	Kaori Yoshida	Japan	2:28:43	Rebecca Chesire	Kenya	2:29:11
2nd	2016	Flomena Cheyech	Kenya	2:23:18	Amane Gobena	Ethiopia	2:25:58	Monica Jepkoech	Kenya	2:28:56
3rd	2017	Flomena Cheyech	Kenya	2:28:39	Shitaye Eshete	Bahrain	2:28:42	Bekelech Daba	Ethiopia	2:30:06
4th	2018	Dalila Gosa	Bahrain	2:25:35	Shitaye Eshete	Bahrain	2:25:39	Sylvia Kibet	Kenya	2:28:38
5th	2019	Peres Jepchirchir	Kenya	2:23:50	Fatuma Sado	Ethiopia	2:26:45	Belaynesh Oljira	Ethiopia	2:27:11

== See also ==
- Tokyo International Women's Marathon (1979–2008)
- Yokohama Women's Marathon (2008–2014)
