= Christopher Walker (athlete) =

Gibraltarian triathlete and cyclist

Personal information
- Full name: Christopher Walker
- Nationality: British; Gibraltarian
- Born: 3 June 1967 (age 59) Ross on Wye, England
- Occupation: Retail manager
- Height: 1.78 m (5 ft 10 in)
- Weight: 76 kg (168 lb)

Sport
- Country: Gibraltar
- Sport: Triathlon, Cycling
Medal record
Island Games
Gold medal – first place	2013 Bermuda	Men's teams
Silver medal – second place	2003 Guernsey	Men's individual
- Updated on 6 January 2014

Christopher Walker (born 3 June 1967) is a Gibraltarian triathlete and cyclist.

== Career ==
Walker first competed for Gibraltar at the 2000 IAAF World Cross Country Championships in Vilamoura, Portugal where he placed 158th in the senior men's race in a time of 46:48 and finished 149th in the men's short race in a time of 14:15. The following year at the 2001 Island Games in the Isle of Man, Walker finished 4th in the men's individual triathlon with a time 2:06:30. At the same meet, Walker also recorded a personal best and national record time of 10:34.95 in the final of the 3000 m steeplechase. In July 2002, Walker made his debut at the Commonwealth Games by competing in the men's triathlon at the 2002 Manchester Games. He finished the course in 2:06:15.19 and placed 26th. Three months later, Walker competed in the 2002 Ironman World Championship in Hawaii. He finished 160th out of 280 in 35–39 age division and 767th out of 1605 overall with a time of 11:22:55. At the 2003 Island Games in Guernsey, Walker won the silver in men's individual triathlon and alongside Harvey Gurry and Anthony Perera finished 6th in the team event.

In November 2004, Walker underwent spinal surgery (an L5-S1 diskectomy) which caused permanent nerve damage to his right calf muscle. This injury made him change from triathlon to cycling.

8 months after his surgery, Walker competed in two cycling events at the 2005 Island Games in Shetland, Scotland. In the men's individual time trial he finished in 27th in 1:04:08.3 and with Julian Bellido and Sigurd Haveland finished 6th in men's team time trial. At the 2006 Commonwealth Games in Melbourne, Walker finished 34th in men's road time trial with a time of 57:30.39. The following year at the 2007 Island Games in Rhodes, Greece, Walker competed in the men's individual town centre criterium and in the triathlon where he finished 5th in the men's individual triathlon with a time 2:05:35 and alongside Edgar Harper, Sigurd Haveland and Kevin Walsh finished 6th in the team event. Walker qualified for the 2008 Ironman 70.3 World Championship held in Clearwater, Florida. He finished 12th out of 159 in the male 40–44 age division and 179th of out of 1493 overall. At the 2010 Commonwealth Games in Delhi, Walker finished 32nd in men's road time trial with a time of 59:05.13. and started but failed to finish the road race. In August 2010, Walker competed in the Outlaw Triathlon in Nottingham where he finished 2nd in his age division and 9th overall in 9:49:08. In May 2011, Walker competed in the 2011 Ironman Lanzarote in Puerto del Carmen finishing 36th out of 299 in the male 40–44 age division and 173rd of 1469 overall in a time of 10:50:50. Cycling was dropped from the program for the 2009 Island Games, however, it returned in two years later at the 2011 Island Games in the Isle of Wight where Walker contested five of six road cycling events. The following year, Walker first competed in the Ironman European Championship in Frankfurt, Germany finishing 4th out of 502 in the male 45–49 age division and 134th of 2885 overall in a personal best time of 9:36:07. This result qualified him for the 2012 Ironman World Championship in Hawaii where he finished 58th out of 225 in his division and 578th out of 1984 overall with a time of 10:23:56. At the 2013 Island Games in Bermuda, Walker failed to finish the men's individual time trial but alongside Mark Francis, Sigurd Haveland, Robert Matto and Sean Randall they finished in 7th place in 3:22:50.817 in the men's time trial team award. The 2013 Games also saw Walker contest the triathlon where he finished in 4th place in the individual event with a time 2:03:36 and won gold in the team event with Derek Barbara, Mark Francis, Mark Garcia, Andrew Gordon, Edgar Harper, Sigurd Haveland, Robert Matto, Richard Muscat and Sean Randall. At the 2013 ITU World Championships in London Walker won silver in the Sprint Distance event in the 45–49 age group with a time of 1:08:16, the first ever ITU World Championship medal for Gibraltar. Walker also competed in the Standard Distance event and finished in 13th place in the 45–49 age group with a time of 1:55:11. At the 2014 Commonwealth Games in Glasgow Walker competed in the Triathlon event and finished in 26th place in 2:10:45 and later that year at the ITU World Championships in Edmonton, Canada Walker won Silver in the Sprint Distance event in the 45 - 49 age group with a time of 1:02:46 and Gold in the Standard Distance event in the 45 - 49 age group with a time of 2:01:07 At the 2015 NatWest Island Games in Jersey Walker finished in 5th place in the individual event and won Bronze team event with Mark Francis, Andrew Gordon, Edgar Harper, Robert Matto and Sean Randall. At the 2015 ITU World Championships in Chicago Walker won Bronze in the Sprint Distance event in the 45 - 49 age group with a time of 1:04:48 and finished 5th in the Standard Distance event in the 45 - 49 age group in a time of 1:50:33

== Personal life ==
Walker grew up in the United Kingdom and initially moved to Gibraltar for work in the early 1990s. Whilst there Walker meet his wife who is from Gibraltar. They got married and together they have four children. In 2000, he was one of the founding members and is now president of the Gibraltar Triathlon Association.
