= Sigurd Haveland =

Personal information
- Full name: Sigurd Haveland
- Born: 30 March 1964 (age 62) Gibraltar
- Occupation: Nutrition consultant
- Height: 1.74 m (5 ft 9 in)
- Weight: 70 kg (154 lb)

Sport
- Country: Gibraltar
- Sport: Triathlon, Cycling
Medal record
Island Games
Gold medal – first place	2013 Bermuda	Men's teams
- Updated on 7 January 2014

Sigurd Haveland (born 30 March 1964) is a Gibraltarian triathlete and cyclist. He is a nutrition consultant by profession.

== Career ==
Haveland was born in Gibraltar and first competed for his country at the 2000 IAAF World Cross Country Championships in Vilamoura, Portugal, where he failed to finish the senior men's race and finished 155th in the men's short race in a time of 14:53. The following year at the 2001 Island Games in the Isle of Man, he finished 12th in the men's individual triathlon with a time 2:13:40. In July 2002, he made his debut at the Commonwealth Games by competing in the men's triathlon at the 2002 Manchester Games. He finished the course in 2:08:31.09 and placed 28th. At the 2003 Island Games in Guernsey, Haveland was due to race in the men's individual triathlon but pulled out. The silver medal was won by fellow Gibraltarian Christopher Walker.

Triathlon was dropped from the program at the 2005 Island Games in Shetland, Scotland, so Haveland competed in two cycling events. In the men's individual time trial he finished in 20th in 1:03:04.6 and with Julian Bellido and Christopher Walker finished 6th in men's team time trial. At the 2006 Commonwealth Games in Melbourne, Haveland finished 39th in men's road time trial with a time of 59:21.76. In June 2007, Haveland raced in the 2007 France Ironman held in Nice. He finished 113th out of 320 in the male 40-44 age division and 554th of out of 1498 overall. The following month at the 2007 Island Games in Rhodes, Greece, Walker competed in the men's individual town centre criterium and in the men's individual time trial where he finished 35th in 58:40. Haveland was also due to compete in the men's individual triathlon but pulled out.

In the team event however, Haveland alongside Edgar Harper, Christopher Walker and Kevin Walsh finished 6th.

At the 2013 Island Games in Bermuda, Haveland finished in 31st place the men's individual time trial with a time of 1:08:11.088 and alongside Mark Francis, Robert Matto, Sean Randall and Christopher Walker finished 7th in the men's time trial team award in 3:22:50.817. The 2013 Games also saw Haveland complete in the triathlon where he finished in 26th place in the individual event with a time 2:15:15 and won gold in the team event with Derek Barbara, Mark Francis, Mark Garcia, Andrew Gordon, Edgar Harper, Robert Matto, Richard Muscat, Sean Randall and Christopher Walker.

== Personal life ==
Haveland is married and is the Secretary General of the Gibraltar Triathlon Association.
