= Kaelo Mosalagae =

Malian athlete

Kaelo Mosalagae (born 23 September 1980) is a Botswana athlete who competed in cross-country and road running.

Mosalagae was a prolific competitor at World Championships. He competed at the IAAF World Cross Country Championships in 2000, 2004, 2005 25th, 2006, 2008, 2009 and 2010 with his best placement being 25th in 2005. He competed at the IAAF World Half Marathon Championships in 2002, 2004, 2005, 2007, 2008, 2009 and 2010 with his best placement also happening in 2005, when he finished 39th. He also competed in the 10,000 metres at the 1999 All-Africa Games.

In his country, he was known as a barefoot runner. He still won national championships in cross-country running in 2015, but when he bowed out in 2016 due to the heat, national press speculated whether this was the end of the "legend of the barefoot runner, Kaelo Mosalagae". He represented the Lefika Athletics Club.
