= Cycling at the 2006 Commonwealth Games – Men's road time trial =

Cycling – men's road time trial at the 2006 Commonwealth Games
- Venue: St Kilda Foreshore and Beach Road
- Location: Melbourne, Australia
- Date: 21 March 2006
- Competitors: 69
- Winning time: 48:37.29

Medalists
gold medal	Nathan O'Neill	Australia
silver medal	Ben Day	Australia
bronze medal	Gordon McCauley	New Zealand

The men's cycling road time trial was one of the road cycling events at the 2006 Commonwealth Games and was held on 21 March on a 40 km course on the St Kilda Foreshore and Beach Road.

== Results ==
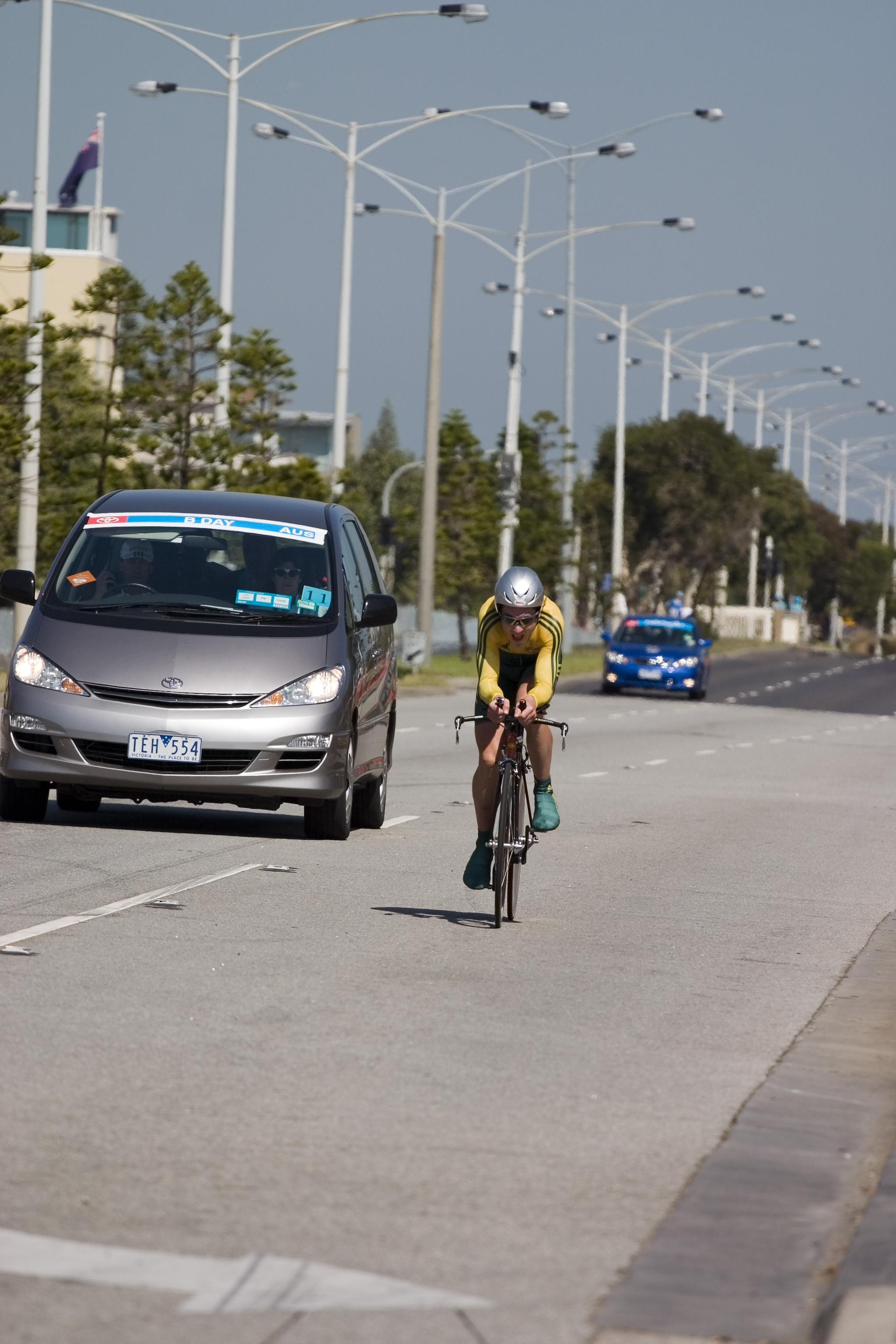
Australian competitor

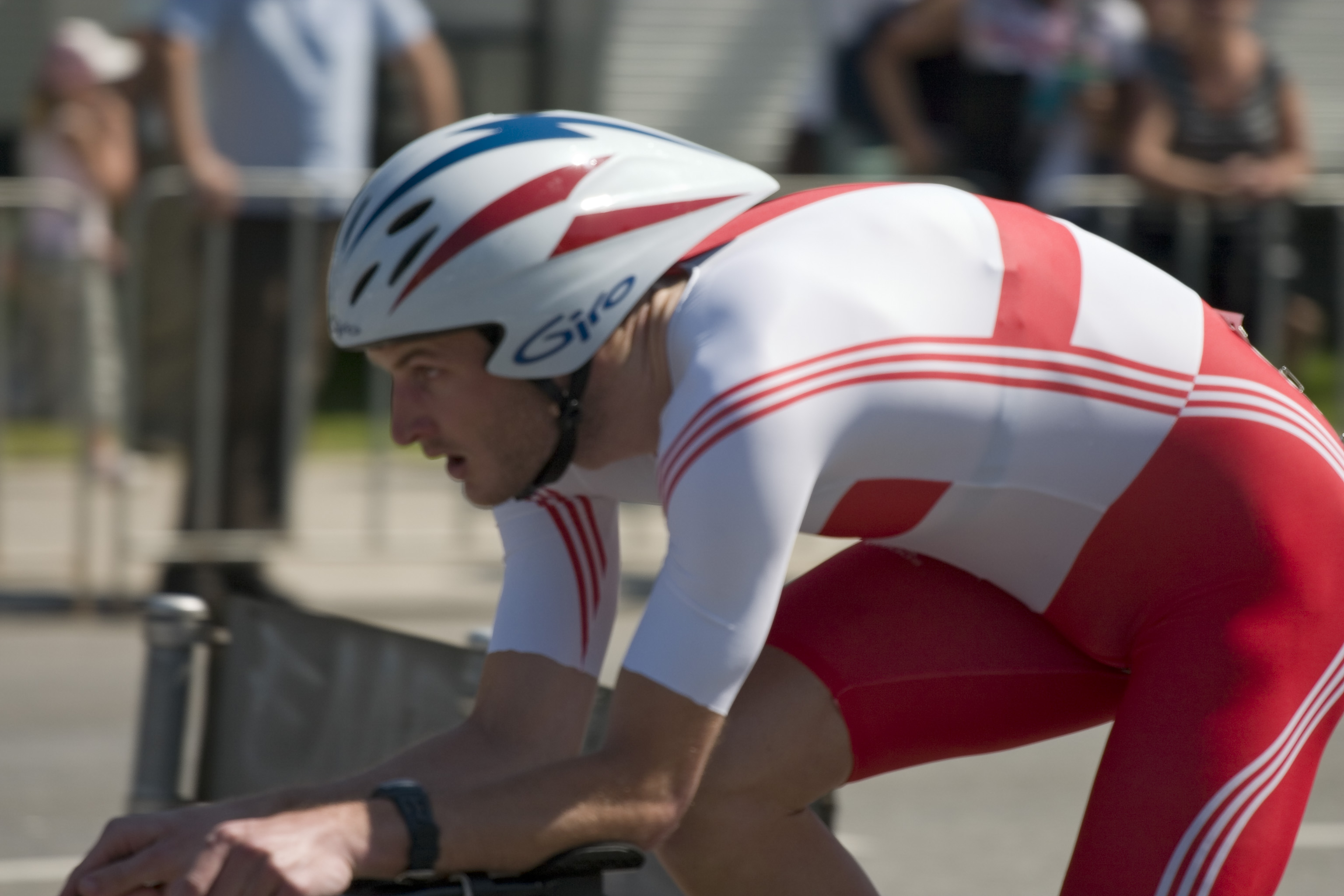
English competitor

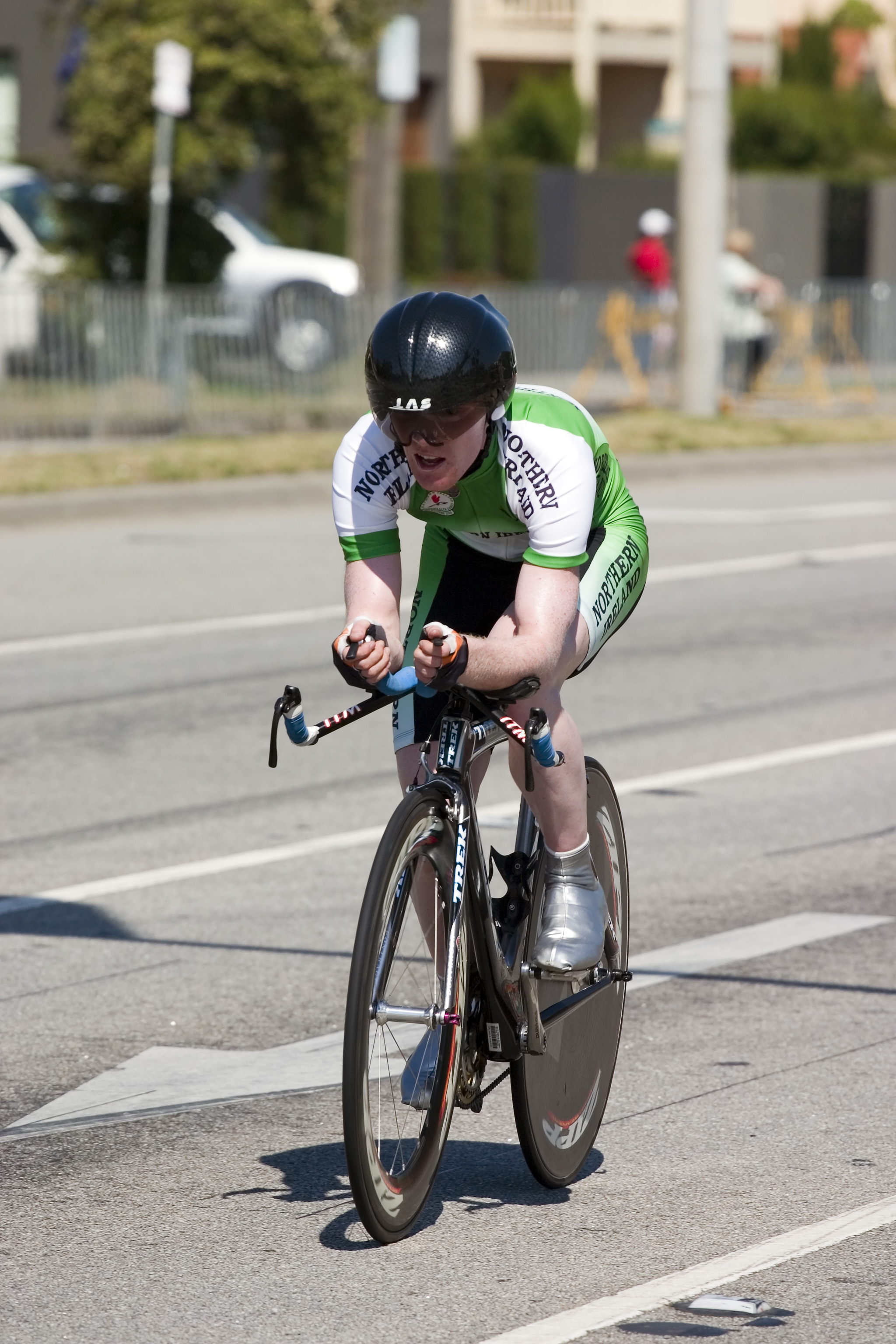
Northern Irish competitor

Rank	Rider	Time
1st place, gold medalist(s)	Nathan O'Neill (AUS)	48:37.29
2nd place, silver medalist(s)	Ben Day (AUS)	49:01.67
3rd place, bronze medalist(s)	Gordon McCauley (NZL)	49:50.70
4	Michael Hutchinson (NIR)	50:05.36
5	David McCann (NIR)	50:15.19
6	Stuart Dangerfield (ENG)	50:57.00
7	Svein Tuft (CAN)	51:09.66
8	Peter Latham (NZL)	51:21.73
9	Paul Manning (ENG)	51:42.85
10	David Harold George (RSA)	51:48.74
11	Andrew Roche (IOM)	51:56.16
12	Logan Hutchings (NZL)	51:56.23
13	Zachary Bell (CAN)	52:07.45
14	Steve Cummings (ENG)	52:10.58
15	Jeremy Paul Maartens (RSA)	53:29.15
16	Ryan Connor (NIR)	53:34.82
17	Chris Froome (KEN)	53:58.01
18	Dan Craven (NAM)	54:23.13
19	Duncan Urquhart (SCO)	54:25.48
20	Matt Brammeier (WAL)	54:58.90
21	Jacques Celliers (NAM)	55:09.34
22	Giocondo Schiavone (MLT)	55:12.76
23	Tyler Barbour Butterfield (BER)	55:37.52
24	Graeme Ian Hatcher (IOM)	55:39.58
25	Arno Viljoen (NAM)	55:49.14
26	Etienne Bonello (MLT)	56:02.21
27	Sam Firby (JER)	56:15.10
28	Shahrul Neeza Mohd Razalli (MAS)	56:29.20
29	Alex Coutts (SCO)	56:31.35
30	Hedson Mathieu (SEY)	56:46.47
31	Andrew William James Cook (IOM)	56:53.86
32	David Kinjah (KEN)	57:04.13
33	Yannick Lincoln (MRI)	57:29.62
34	Christopher Walker (GIB)	57:30.39
35	Julian Bellido (GIB)	57:42.82
36	Muhammad Fauzan Ahmad Lufti (MAS)	58:28.90
37	Tinga Turner (JAM)	59:11.55
38	Vinesh Lal (FIJ)	59:13.49
39	Sigurd Haveland (GIB)	59:21.76
40	Jonathan David Massie (BAH)	59:32.68
41	Charles Bryan (ANG)	59:33.11
42	Kris Pradel (ANG)	59:35.90
43	Sadrac Teguimaha (CMR)	1:00:01.15
44	Duke Perrigoff Merren (CAY)	1:00:42.88
45	Imran Sharif (PAK)	1:00:51.67
46	Martinien Tega (CMR)	1:00:54.82
47	Muhammad Saleem (PAK)	1:00:58.41
48	Robert Frances Marsh (ANT)	1:01:07.50
49	Damien Tekou Foukou (CMR)	1:01:14.59
50	Ronnie Bryan (ANG)	1:01:25.57
51	Davidson Kamau Kihagi (KEN)	1:01:40.73
52	Barron Musgrove (BAH)	1:01:44.79
53	Philip Clarke (BAR)	1:02:02.41
54	Ken Manassah Jackson (ANT)	1:03:20.92
55	Lynn Byron Murray (ANT)	1:03:28.38
56	Neil Thomas (IVB)	1:03:33.99
57	Hilarry Moono Ng'Ake (ZAM)	1:04:40.63
58	James Malako (ZAM)	1:05:01.92
59	Tumisang Taabe (LES)	1:05:05.27
60	Poloko Makara (LES)	1:05:33.31
61	David Matovu Kigongo (UGA)	1:07:21.65
62	Percival Navolo (FIJ)	1:07:34.46
63	Rajendra Singh (FIJ)	1:08:13.49
64	David Magezi (UGA)	1:08:18.65
65	Moeketsi Makatile (LES)	1:08:25.50
66	Alhassan Bangura (SLE)	1:08:28.01
	Colin Mayer (MRI)	DSQ
	Mohamed Sesay (SLE)	DSQ
	Ian Smith (BIZ)	DNF
