= Eduardo Henriques =

Portuguese runner (born 1968)

Eduardo António da Silva Henriques (born 24 March 1968 in Alenquer) is a Portuguese runner who specialized in the 3000 metres steeplechase and cross-country running. Since 1999 he has mainly been running half marathon.

== Achievements ==
Year	Competition	Venue	Position	Event	Notes
Representing Portugal
1992	Ibero-American Championships	Seville, Spain	2nd	3000m steeplechase	8:40.35
1995	World Cross Country Championships	Durham, United Kingdom	33rd	Long race (12.02 km)	35:39
1995	World Cross Country Championships	Durham, United Kingdom	4th	Team competition	139 pts
1997	World Cross Country Championships	Turin, Italy	30th	Long race (12.333 km)	36:48
1997	World Cross Country Championships	Turin, Italy	4th	Team competition	263 pts
1998	World Cross Country Championships	Marrakesh, Morocco	25th	Long race (12 km)	35:36
1998	World Cross Country Championships	Marrakesh, Morocco	4th	Team competition	74 pts
1999	World Cross Country Championships	Belfast, United Kingdom	14th	Long race (12 km)	40:46
1999	World Cross Country Championships	Belfast, United Kingdom	3rd	Team competition	76 pts
1999	World Half Marathon Championships	Palermo, Italy	5th	Half marathon	1:01:53
2000	World Cross Country Championships	Vilamoura, Portugal	10th	Long race (12.3 km)	35:56
2000	World Cross Country Championships	Vilamoura, Portugal	3rd	Team competition	69 pts
2002	World Cross Country Championships	Dublin, Ireland	19th	Long race (11.998 km)	36:20
2002	World Cross Country Championships	Dublin, Ireland	9th	Team competition	166 pts
2003	World Cross Country Championships	Lausanne, Switzerland	16th	Long race (12.355 km)	37:33
2003	World Cross Country Championships	Lausanne, Switzerland	5th	Team competition	85 pts
2006	World Cross Country Championships	Fukuoka, Japan	27th	Long race (12 km)	37:04
2006	World Cross Country Championships	Fukuoka, Japan	7th	Team competition	152 pts

=== Personal bests ===
- 1500 metres – 3:38.82 min (1992)
- 3000 metres – 7:51.00 min (1993)
- 3000 metres steeplechase – 8:27.53 min (1996)
- 5000 metres – 13:26.91 min (1998)
- 10,000 metres – 28:05.09 min (2003)
- Half marathon – 1:01:41 hrs (2006)
