= Zambia at the 2006 Commonwealth Games =

- CGF code: ZAM
- CGA: National Olympic Committee of Zambia
- Website: nocz.co.zm

in Melbourne, Australia 15 March 2006 – 26 March 2006
- Competitors: 23 in 8 sports
- Medals: Gold 0 Silver 0 Bronze 0 Total 0

Commonwealth Games appearances (overview)
- 1954; 1958; 1962–1966; 1970; 1974; 1978; 1982; 1986; 1990; 1994; 1998; 2002; 2006; 2010; 2014; 2018; 2022; 2026; 2030

Other related appearances
- Rhodesia and Nyasaland (1962)

Zambia at the 2006 Commonwealth Games in Melbourne.

== Athletics ==
Key

- Note–Ranks given for track events are within the athlete's heat only
- Q = Qualified for the next round
- q = Qualified for the next round as a fastest loser or, in field events, by position without achieving the qualifying target
- NR = National record
- N/A = Round not applicable for the event
- Bye = Athlete not required to compete in round

Men
Track & road events

Athlete	Event	Heat		Quarterfinal		Semifinal		Final	
Athlete	Event	Result	Rank	Result	Rank	Result	Rank	Result	Rank
onny Wamulwa				—				'	

Women
Track & road events

== Road ==
Men

Athlete	Event	Time	Rank
Hilarry Moono Ng'Ake	Time trial	1:04:40.63	57
Hilarry Moono Ng'Ake	road race		DNF
James Malako	Time trial	58	1:05:01.92
James Malako	road race		DNF

== Lawn bowls ==
Men

Athlete	Event	Group Stage						Quarterfinal	Semifinal	Final	
Athlete	Event	Opposition Score	Opposition Score	Opposition Score	Opposition Score	Opposition Score	Rank	Opposition Score	Opposition Score	Opposition Score	Rank
	Singles	Edward Kasonde Nkole									8th

Women

Athlete	Event	Group Stage						Quarterfinal	Semifinal	Final	
Athlete	Event	Opposition Score	Opposition Score	Opposition Score	Opposition Score	Opposition Score	Rank	Opposition Score	Opposition Score	Opposition Score	Rank
	Pairs	Eddah Mpezeni; Foster Banda			—						5th

== Weightlifting ==
Men

Athlete	Event	Snatch		Clean & Jerk		Total	Rank
Athlete	Event	Result	Rank	Result	Rank	Total	Rank
Obrie Nondo	56 kg	95	7	120	8	215	10
Gift Mwewa	69 kg	93	14	130	12	223	14
