= 2000 IAAF World Cross Country Championships – Senior women's race =

Senior women's race at the 2000 IAAF World Cross Country Championships
- Organisers: IAAF
- Edition: 28th
- Date: March 18
- Host city: Vilamoura, Algarve, Portugal
- Venue: Sporting Complex of Vilamoura
- Events: 1
- Distances: 8.08 km – Senior women
- Participation: 104 athletes from 29 nations

The Senior women's race at the 2000 IAAF World Cross Country Championships was held at the Sporting Complex in Vilamoura, Portugal, on March 18, 2000. Reports of the event were given in The New York Times, in the Herald, and for the IAAF.

Complete results for individuals, for teams, medallists, and the results of British athletes who took part were published.

== Race results ==
=== Senior women's race (8.08 km) ===
==== Individual ====
Rank	Athlete	Country	Time
1st place, gold medalist(s)	Derartu Tulu	Ethiopia	25:42
2nd place, silver medalist(s)	Gete Wami	Ethiopia	25:48
3rd place, bronze medalist(s)	Susan Chepkemei	Kenya	25:50
4	Lydia Cheromei	Kenya	26:02
5	Paula Radcliffe	United Kingdom	26:03
6	Leah Malot	Kenya	26:09
7	Sonia O'Sullivan	Ireland	26:20
8	Merima Denboba	Ethiopia	26:23
9	Ayelech Worku	Ethiopia	26:36
10	Ruth Kutol	Kenya	26:38
11	Irene Kipchumba	Kenya	26:45
12	Deena Drossin	United States	26:59
13	Jen Rhines	United States	27:11
14	Berhane Adere	Ethiopia	27:11
15	Olivera Jevtić	Yugoslavia	27:14
16	Teresa Recio	Spain	27:14
17	Lidiya Grigoryeva	Russia	27:15
18	Anja Smolders	Belgium	27:16
19	Agata Balsamo	Italy	27:17
20	Rosemary Ryan	Ireland	27:17
21	Kylie Risk	Australia	27:17
22	Restituta Joseph	Tanzania	27:23
23	Samukeliso Moyo	Zimbabwe	27:25
24	Annemari Sandell	Finland	27:26
25	Magdeline Chemjor	Kenya	27:29
26	Mizuki Noguchi	Japan	27:30
27	Breda Dennehy	Ireland	27:32
28	Asha Gigi	Ethiopia	27:35
29	Ana Dias	Portugal	27:36
30	Marta Fernández	Spain	27:38
31	Silvia Sommaggio	Italy	27:41
32	Tausi Juma	Tanzania	27:42
33	Kaori Kumasaka	Japan	27:43
34	Hayley Yelling	United Kingdom	27:43
35	Constantina Diţă	Romania	27:45
36	Rachel Sauder	United States	27:47
37	Kimberly Fitchen	United States	27:48
38	Clair Fearnley	Australia	27:51
39	Miyuki Nishimura	Japan	27:52
40	María Abel	Spain	27:55
41	Mónica Rosa	Portugal	27:58
42	Tina Connelly	Canada	27:59
43	Svetlana Baygulova	Russia	27:59
44	Liz Yelling	United Kingdom	28:02
45	Rosa Oliveira	Portugal	28:03
46	Iulia Olteanu	Romania	28:04
47	Anne Keenan-Buckley	Ireland	28:04
48	Silvia Weissteiner	Italy	28:09
49	Charné Rademeyer	South Africa	28:10
50	Miho Kakehata	Japan	28:14
51	Julia Vaquero	Spain	28:15
52	Conceição Ferreira	Portugal	28:18
53	Dulce María Rodríguez	Mexico	28:19
54	Sharon Morris	United Kingdom	28:27
55	Donna Garcia	United States	28:35
56	Hayley Haining	United Kingdom	28:37
57	Cristina Grosu	Romania	28:38
58	Deborah Buhlers	Canada	28:38
59	Tara Krzywicki	United Kingdom	28:39
60	Alessandra Aguilar	Spain	28:41
61	Isabelle Collier	Belgium	28:42
62	Margareth Iro	Tanzania	28:44
63	Lidia Karwowski	Brazil	28:52
64	Stefanija Statkuvienė	Belgium	28:54
65	Tarath Tsatsa	Zimbabwe	28:57
66	Sabrina Varrone	Italy	28:59
67	Lee-Ann McPhillips	New Zealand	29:04
68	Elena Fidatof	Romania	29:09
69	Sitar Waru	New Zealand	29:13
70	Yelena Samokhvalova	Russia	29:14
71	Bruna Genovese	Italy	29:15
72	Rukia Mkanda	Tanzania	29:16
73	Adriana de Souza	Brazil	29:23
74	Maria Rodrigues	Brazil	29:24
75	Sherri Smith	Canada	29:26
76	Rosângela Faria	Brazil	29:32
77	Taeko Matsubayashi	Japan	29:39
78	Oksana Vasilevskaya	Belarus	29:41
79	Cristina Casandra	Romania	29:45
80	Maria McCambridge	Ireland	29:59
81	Aruna Devi Waishram	India	30:00
82	Nebiat Habtemariam	Eritrea	30:00
83	Rosita Rota Gelpi	Italy	30:14
84	Judith Leroy	Canada	30:17
85	Lisa Harvey	Canada	30:47
86	Corinne Debaets	Belgium	30:52
87	Valerie Vaughan	Ireland	31:02
88	Katherine Smyth	New Zealand	31:18
89	Mokhantso Raphoto	Lesotho	32:18
90	Kanchhi Koju	Nepal	32:31
91	Sharda Gawande	India	32:37
92	Anastasiya Padalinskaya	Belarus	33:01
93	Pushpa Devi	India	33:11
94	Rina Das	India	33:12
95	Tatyana Zavyalova	Belarus	33:36
96	Anastasiya Sinyak	Belarus	34:23
—	Elva Dryer	United States	DNF
—	Helena Sampaio	Portugal	DNF
—	Beatriz Santíago	Spain	DNF
—	Irina Matrosova	Uzbekistan	DNF
—	Stephanie Mills	Canada	DNF
—	Erica van der Bilt	Netherlands	DNF
—	Analídia Torre	Portugal	DNF
—	Alla Syomina	Uzbekistan	DNF

==== Teams ====
Rank	Team	Points
1st place, gold medalist(s)	Ethiopia: Derartu Tulu / 1; Gete Wami / 2; Merima Denboba / 8; Ayelech Worku / 9; (Berhane Adere) / (14); (Asha Gigi) / (28)	20
2nd place, silver medalist(s)	Kenya: Susan Chepkemei / 3; Lydia Cheromei / 4; Leah Malot / 6; Ruth Kutol / 10; (Irene Kipchumba) / (11); (Magdeline Chemjor) / (25)	23
3rd place, bronze medalist(s)	United States: Deena Drossin / 12; Jen Rhines / 13; Rachel Sauder / 36; Kimberly Fitchen / 37; (Donna Garcia) / (55); (Elva Dryer) / (DNF)	98
4	Ireland: Sonia O'Sullivan / 7; Rosemary Ryan / 20; Breda Dennehy / 27; Anne Keenan-Buckley / 47; (Maria McCambridge) / (80); (Valerie Vaughan) / (87)	101
5	Spain: Teresa Recio / 16; Marta Fernández / 30; María Abel / 40; Julia Vaquero / 51; (Alessandra Aguilar) / (60); (Beatriz Santíago) / (DNF)	137
6	United Kingdom: Paula Radcliffe / 5; Hayley Yelling / 34; Liz Yelling / 44; Sharon Morris / 54; (Hayley Haining) / (56); (Tara Krzywicki) / (59)	137
7	Japan: Mizuki Noguchi / 26; Kaori Kumasaka / 33; Miyuki Nishimura / 39; Miho Kakehata / 50; (Taeko Matsubayashi) / (77)	148
8	Italy: Agata Balsamo / 19; Silvia Sommaggio / 31; Silvia Weissteiner / 48; Sabrina Varrone / 66; (Bruna Genovese) / (71); (Rosita Rota Gelpi) / (83)	164
9	Portugal: Ana Dias / 29; Mónica Rosa / 41; Rosa Oliveira / 45; Conceição Ferreira / 52; (Helena Sampaio) / (DNF); (Analídia Torre) / (DNF)	167
10	Tanzania: Restituta Joseph / 22; Tausi Juma / 32; Margareth Iro / 62; Rukia Mkanda / 72	188
11	Romania: Constantina Diţă / 35; Iulia Olteanu / 46; Cristina Grosu / 57; Elena Fidatof / 68; (Cristina Casandra) / (79)	206
12	Belgium: Anja Smolders / 18; Isabelle Collier / 61; Stefanija Statkuvienė / 64; Corinne Debaets / 86	229
13	Canada: Tina Connelly / 42; Deborah Buhlers / 58; Sherri Smith / 75; Judith Leroy / 84; (Lisa Harvey) / (85); (Stephanie Mills) / (DNF)	259
14	Brazil: Lidia Karwowski / 63; Adriana de Souza / 73; Maria Rodrigues / 74; Rosângela Faria / 76	286
15	India: Aruna Devi Waishram / 81; Sharda Gawande / 91; Pushpa Devi / 93; Rina Das / 94	359
16	Belarus: Oksana Vasilevskaya / 78; Anastasiya Padalinskaya / 92; Tatyana Zavyalova / 95; Anastasiya Sinyak / 96	361

- Note: Athletes in parentheses did not score for the team result

== Participation ==
An unofficial count yields the participation of 104 athletes from 29 countries in the Senior women's race.

- Australia (2)
- Belarus (4)
- Belgium (4)
- Brazil (4)
- Canada (6)
- Eritrea (1)
- Ethiopia (6)
- Finland (1)
- India (4)
- Ireland (6)
- Italy (6)
- Japan (5)
- Kenya (6)
- Lesotho (1)
- Mexico (1)
- Nepal (1)
- Netherlands (1)
- New Zealand (3)
- Portugal (6)
- Romania (5)
- Russia (3)
- South Africa (1)
- Spain (6)
- Tanzania (4)
- United Kingdom (6)
- United States (6)
- Uzbekistan (2)
- Yugoslavia (1)
- Zimbabwe (2)

== See also ==
- 2000 IAAF World Cross Country Championships – Senior men's race
- 2000 IAAF World Cross Country Championships – Men's short race
- 2000 IAAF World Cross Country Championships – Junior men's race
- 2000 IAAF World Cross Country Championships – Women's short race
- 2000 IAAF World Cross Country Championships – Junior women's race
