= Karl Keska =

English long-distance runner

Personal information
- Nationality: British (English)
- Born: 7 May 1972 (age 54) Wolverhampton, England
- Height: 185 cm (6 ft 1 in)
- Weight: 69 kg (152 lb)

Sport
- Sport: Athletics
- Event: Long-distance
- Club: Birchfield Harriers

Karl Keska (born 7 May 1972) is a male English former long-distance runner who specialised in the 10,000 metres and competed at the 2000 Summer Olympics.

== Biography ==
Keska competed collegiately for University of Oregon from 1992 to 1996, where he was an All-American (10,000 m) and three time PAC-10 Conference Champion (10,000 m in 1995, 1996, cross-country in 1995).

He was an Olympic finalist in the 10,000 metres in the 2000 Summer Olympics where he represented Great Britain.

He represented England in the 5,000 metres event, at the 1998 Commonwealth Games in Kuala Lumpur, Malaysia.

Keska became the British 10,000 metres champion after placing as the highest British athlete at the 1998 AAA Championships.

== International competitions ==
| Year | Competition | Venue | Position | Notes |
Representing Great Britain and England
| 1998 | Commonwealth Games | Kuala Lumpur, Malaysia | 4th | 5000m |
| 2000 | World Cross Country Championships | Vilamoura, Portugal | 13th | Long race |
| 2000 | Olympic Games | Sydney, Australia | 8th | 10,000 m |
| 2002 | European Championships | Munich, Germany | 5th | 10,000 m |
| 2003 | World Championships | Paris, France | 9th | 10,000 m |
| 2004 | European Cross Country Championships | Heringsdorf, Germany | 7th | Men's Race |

== Personal bests ==
- 3000 metres – 7:38.04 min (1998)
- 5000 metres – 13:20.30 min (2002)
- 10,000 metres – 27:44.09 min (2000)
