= Luigi La Bella =

Italian long-distance runner

Personal information
- Nationality: Italian
- Born: 25 February 1982 (age 44)

Sport
- Country: Italy
- Sport: Athletics
- Event: Long-distance running

Achievements and titles
- Personal best: Half marathon: 1:05:59 (2007)

Luigi La Bella (born 25 February 1982) is a former Italian male long-distance runner who competed at one edition of the IAAF World Cross Country Championships at senior level (2005).
