= Philip Mosima =

Kenyan runner

Medal record

Men's athletics

Representing Kenya

World Junior Championships
Bronze medal – third place	1994 Lisbon	1500 metres

World Cross Country Championships
Gold medal – first place	1993 Amorebieta	Junior race
Gold medal – first place	1994 Budapest	Junior race

Philip Mosima^{[nb]} (born 1 February 1977) is a Kenyan professional runner who specialises in middle- and long distance running.

He was a promising junior cross country runner, winning the junior men's race at the IAAF World Cross Country Championships in 1993. The following year proved to be his breakthrough season, as he repeated his cross country success at the 1994 edition, won the 1500 metres at the African Junior Athletics Championships, and took a bronze medal in the same event at the 1994 World Junior Championships in Athletics in Lisbon. He also finished fifth in the 5000 metres race at the 1994 Commonwealth Games.

He began to move up in distance over the next few years and set world junior records in the 3000 metres and 5000 m in 1996. He became a regular on the Dutch running circuit in the late nineties: at the Warandeloop cross country race he took third in 1996, won the 1997 edition, and came second the following year.

He broke the meeting record for the 3000 m at the KBC Night of Athletics in 1998, setting a time of 7:41.17. Following this he beat Marathon world record holder Paul Tergat in the Belgrade Race Through History competition in 1998, winning the competition in 17:02. He ran in the senior short race at the 2000 World Cross Country Championships, finishing in seventh place overall. He made top ten finishes in the Zevenheuvelenloop 15 km race in 2000 and 2001 and won the 2002 Parelloop competition. He set a 10-mile race best in 2001 running in the Dam tot Damloop, where he finished in fifth place with 46:34. He took the silver medal in the 3000 m at the Fanny Blankers-Koen Games in 2002, his time of 7:42.76 not enough to beat compatriot Richard Limo.

He joined the Hitachi running team in Japan and in 2004 he broke a meeting record at the Osaka Grand Prix. His time of 13:10.48 in the 5000 m bettered Haile Gebrselassie's previous mark by over three seconds. At the 2004 Sapporo Half Marathon, Mosima ran a personal best of 1:02:21 for ninth place. That same year, he formed part of the Kenyan team for the International Chiba Ekiden, and they finished second behind the Ethiopian team.

== Personal bests ==
Surface	Event	Time (h:m:s)	Venue	Date
Track	1500 m	3:35.65	Arnhem, Netherlands	12 July 1997
Track	3000 m	7:35.52	London, United Kingdom	12 July 1996
Track	Two miles	8:14.45	Hengelo, Netherlands	31 May 1997
Track	5000 m	12:53.72	Rome, Italy	5 June 1996
Road	15 km	43:48+	Sapporo, Japan	4 July 2004
Road	10 miles	46:34	Zaandam, Netherlands	23 September 2001
Road	20 km	58:58+	Sapporo, Japan	4 July 2004
Road	Half marathon	1:02:21	Sapporo, Japan	4 July 2004

- All information taken from IAAF profile.

== Notes ==
- ^{nb} Philip Mosima's surname is sometimes incorrectly stated as Mossima.
