= Abiyote Abate =

Ethiopian long-distance runner

- Born: 20 November 1980 (age 45); Addis Ababa, Ethiopia
- Occupation: Runner

Abiyote Abate (Amharic: አብዮተ አባቴ; born 20 November 1980) is an Ethiopian retired long-distance runner who specialized in the 3000 and 5000 meters. He has not competed on top level since 2005.

== International competitions ==
Year	Competition	Venue	Position	Event	Notes
2000	World Cross Country Championships	Vilamoura, Portugal	11th	Short race	
2000	World Cross Country Championships	Vilamoura, Portugal	2nd	Team competition	
2001	World Championships	Edmonton, Canada	7th	5000 m	
2002	World Cross Country Championships	Dublin, Ireland	15th	Short race	
2002	World Cross Country Championships	Dublin, Ireland	2nd	Team competition	
2003	World Indoor Championships	Birmingham, United Kingdom	5th	3000 m	
2003	World Championships	Paris, France	11th	5000 m	
2004	World Indoor Championships	Budapest, Hungary	11th	3000 m	

== Personal bests ==
- 3000 metres – 7:32.38 min (2001)
- 5000 metres – 13:00.36 min (2001)
- 10,000 metres – 27:45.56 min (2005)
