= Catherine Webombesa =

Ugandan long-distance runner

Personal information
- Nationality: Ugandan
- Born: 19 May 1982 (age 44)

Sport
- Country: Uganda
- Sport: Long-distance running
- Event: 1500 metres

Achievements and titles
- Personal best: 1500 meters: 4:21 (2007)
Medal record
Women's athletics
Representing Uganda
East Africa Senior Athletic Championships
| Gold medal – first place | 2007 Gold Coast | 1500m |
| Silver medal – second place | 2007 Silver Coast | 1500m |

Catherine Webombesa (born 19 May 1983) is a Ugandan middle-distance runner. She participated in the East Africa Senior Athletic Championships at Nambole stadium in 2007, where she won gold and silver medals, achieving second place for Uganda.

== Career ==
Webombesa has competed in a number of road and track competitions, including:

Recognition as a national champion.

Personal Bests: With times of 2:08.21 for the 800 meters, 4:21.0 hours for the 1500 meters, and 9:29.941 for the 3000 meters, she has set personal bests in these events.

International Competitions: In the 1998 World Youth Games in Moscow, she took home the gold medal in the 3000m. She also runs remarkable times in road events, including a 33:09 time for a 10-kilometer race and a 1:13:391 time for a half marathon.

National Road Running Champion: In long-distance competitions, Webombesa won the title of national road running champion for Uganda.

Catherine Webombesa participated in international competitions in France and Russia, over a range of distances.

== See also ==
- Dorcus Inzikuru
- Mercyline Chelangat
- Sarah Chelangat
- Doreen Chemutai
- Immaculate Chemutai
