= Aziz Driouche =

Moroccan long-distance runner

Personal information
- Born: 13 November 1977 (age 48) Boujad, Morocco

Sport
- Country: Morocco
- Sport: Long-distance running

Aziz Driouche (born 13 November 1977) is a Moroccan long-distance runner.

At the 2000 World Cross Country Championships he finished eighteenth in the short race, while the Moroccan team of which he was a part took a bronze medal in the team competition. Competing in the 3000 metres steeplechase during track season, he finished fifth at the 1999 Summer Universiade and fourth at the 2001 Summer Universiade, the latter in a personal best time of 8:25.69 minutes.

He has a degree in mechanical engineering from Kagos Kashima University, Japan.
