= Roberto Antonelli (runner) =

Italian long-distance runner (born 1968)

Personal information
- Nationality: Italian
- Born: 15 April 1968 (age 58)

Sport
- Country: Italy
- Sport: Athletics
- Event: Long-distance running

Achievements and titles
- Personal best: Half marathon: 1:04:28 (1999)

Roberto Antonelli (born 15 April 1968) is a former Italian male long-distance runner who competed at one edition of the IAAF World Cross Country Championships at senior level (2000).
