= Leonard Mucheru Maina =

Kenyan long-distance runner

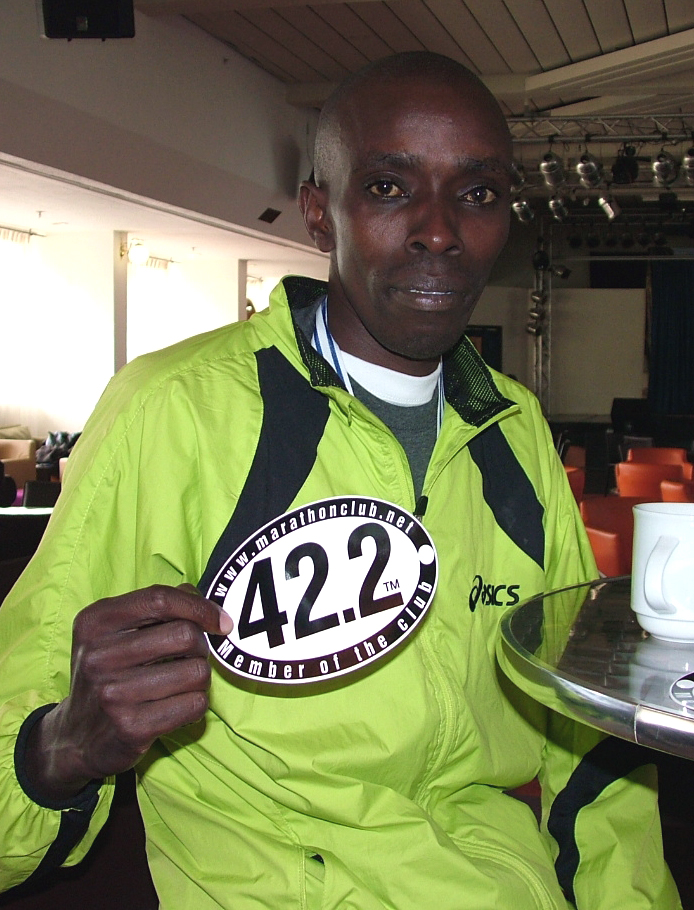
- Leonard Mucheru Maina, winner of 2008 Tiberias Marathon

Medal record

Men's athletics

Representing Bahrain

Asian Games
Silver medal – second place	2006 Doha	5000 m

Asian Indoor Championships
Gold medal – first place	2004 Tehran	3000 m

Leonard Mucheru Maina (born 13 June 1978 in Nyandarua) is a Kenyan long-distance runner, who started from 2004 until 2007 as Mushir Salem Jawher (Arabic: مشير سالم جوهر), having acquired the citizenship of Bahrain.

== Career ==
Mucheru originally represented Kenya and finished fourth in the short race at the 2000 World Cross Country Championships. He moved to Bahrain in 2003 and was granted citizenship in 2004, at the same time getting a new Arabic name. At that time Bahrain acquired a number of runners from African countries, especially Kenya.

In 2001, Mucheru won the Millrose Games 3,000 Meters in a time of 7:50.01, and also won the Rye Derby 5-Mile race in 23:18.

Before changing nationality Maina finished seventh at the 2003 World Indoor Championships and fourth at the 2003 World Athletics Final. In 2004 he became Asian Indoor Champion for Bahrain in 3000 metres. This stirred some controversy as he, according to IAAF rules, was not eligible to run for his new country until 16 March 2006. At the end of the season he finished fourth at the World Athletics Final for the second year in a row. However, he was absent from the top international level until late 2006 when he won a silver medal at the Asian Games. Other medalists for Bahrain included Yusuf Saad Kamel, Belal Mansoor Ali and Tareq Mubarak Taher, also imported from Kenya.

On 4 January 2007, Jawher won his first marathon race, the Tiberias Marathon held in Tiberias, Israel, finishing in 2 hours 12 minutes and 13 seconds. He was the first athlete from an Arab country to compete in Israel, and was subsequently stripped of his Bahraini citizenship. On 21 January 2007 it was reported that Bahrain had reversed its decision to strip him of his Bahraini citizenship, and has been allowed to continue competing for the Persian Gulf state.

In December 2007, it was reported that he had re-acquired Kenyan citizenship.

He successfully defended his Tiberias Marathon title in 2008 with a course record of 2:10:30. It was also his personal best then. Mucheru competed Tiberias Marathon again in 2009, but finished 2nd with a time of 2:09:37. The winner, Jackson Kipkoech from Kenya, set a new course record of 2:08:07.

In 2010, he failed to make the top ten at the Tiberias race, but was eighth at the high-calibre Dubai Marathon and fourth at the San Diego Marathon. He improved his personal best by over half a minute at the Daegu Marathon in April 2011, taking third place overall.

== Personal bests ==
- 1500 metres – 3:33.79 min (2001)
- One mile – 3:49.75 min (2001)
- 3000 metres – 7:35.35 min (2001)
- 3000 metres steeplechase – 8:47.34 min (2000)
- 5000 metres – 12:59.79 min (2005)
- Marathon – 2:08:53 min (2011)
- Olympics – silver

== See also ==
- List of nationality transfers in athletics
