= 2000 IAAF World Cross Country Championships =

Coordinates: 37°06′05″N 8°09′00″W

- Organisers: IAAF
- Edition: 28th
- Date: March 18/19
- Host city: Vilamoura, Algarve, Portugal
- Venue: Sporting Complex of Vilamoura
- Events: 6
- Distances: 12.3 km – Senior men 4.18 km – Men's short 8.08 km – Junior men 8.08 km – Senior women 4.18 km – Women's short 6.29 km – Junior women
- Participation: 805 athletes from 76 nations

The 2000 IAAF World Cross Country Championships took place on March 18/19, 2000. The races were held at the Sporting Complex in Vilamoura, Portugal. Reports of the event were given in The New York Times, in the Herald, and for the IAAF.

Complete results for senior men, for senior men's teams, for men's short race, for men's short race teams, for junior men, for junior men's teams, senior women, for senior women's teams, for women's short race, for women's short race teams, for junior women, for junior women's teams, medallists, and the results of British athletes who took part were published.

== Medallists ==
| Event | Gold | | Silver | | Bronze | |
|---|---|---|---|---|---|---|
Individual
| Senior men (12.3 km) | Mohammed Mourhit; Belgium | 35:00 | Assefa Mezegebu; Ethiopia | 35:01 | Paul Tergat; Kenya | 35:02 |
| Men's short (4.18 km) | John Kibowen; Kenya | 11:11 | Sammy Kipketer; Kenya | 11:12 | Paul Kosgei; Kenya | 11:15 |
| Junior men (8.08 km) | Robert Kipchumba; Kenya | 22:49 | Duncan Lebo; Kenya | 22:52 | John Cheruiyot Korir; Kenya | 22:55 |
| Senior women (8.08 km) | Derartu Tulu; Ethiopia | 25:42 | Gete Wami; Ethiopia | 25:48 | Susan Chepkemei; Kenya | 25:50 |
| Women's short (4.18 km) | Kutre Dulecha; Ethiopia | 13:00 | Zahra Ouaziz; Morocco | 13:00 | Margaret Ngotho; Kenya | 13:00 |
| Junior women (6.29 km) | Vivian Cheruiyot; Kenya | 20:34 | Alice Timbilil; Kenya | 20:35 | Viola Kibiwott; Kenya | 20:36 |
Team
| Senior men | Kenya | 18 | Ethiopia | 68 | Portugal | 69 |
| Men's short | Kenya | 10 | Ethiopia | 46 | Morocco | 68 |
| Junior men | Kenya | 10 | Ethiopia | 47 | Uganda | 68 |
| Senior women | Ethiopia | 20 | Kenya | 23 | United States | 98 |
| Women's short | Portugal | 46 | Ethiopia | 55 | France | 57 |
| Junior women | Kenya | 12 | Ethiopia | 24 | Japan | 78 |

== Race results ==
=== Senior men's race (12.3 km) ===
Individual race
| Rank | Athlete | Country | Time |
|---|---|---|---|
| 1st place, gold medalist(s) | Mohammed Mourhit | Belgium | 35:00 |
| 2nd place, silver medalist(s) | Assefa Mezegebu | Ethiopia | 35:01 |
| 3rd place, bronze medalist(s) | Paul Tergat | Kenya | 35:02 |
| 4 | Patrick Ivuti | Kenya | 35:03 |
| 5 | Wilberforce Talel | Kenya | 35:06 |
| 6 | Paul Koech | Kenya | 35:22 |
| 7 | Charles Kamathi | Kenya | 35:51 |
| 8 | Sergiy Lebid | Ukraine | 35:52 |
| 9 | Abdellah Béhar | France | 35:55 |
| 10 | Eduardo Henriques | Portugal | 35:56 |
| 11 | Abraham Cherono | Kenya | 36:00 |
| 12 | Domingos Castro | Portugal | 36:01 |
Full results

Teams
| Rank | Team | Points |
|---|---|---|
| 1st place, gold medalist(s) | Kenya: Paul Tergat / 3; Patrick Ivuti / 4; Wilberforce Talel / 5; Paul Koech / 6; (Charles Kamathi) / (7); (Abraham Cherono) / (11) | 18 |
| 2nd place, silver medalist(s) | Ethiopia: Assefa Mezegebu / 2; Lemma Alemayehu / 16; Tesfaye Tola / 23; Amebesse Tolossa / 27; (Dereje Tadesse) / (44); (Debebe Demisse) / (74) | 68 |
| 3rd place, bronze medalist(s) | Portugal: Eduardo Henriques / 10; Domingos Castro / 12; António Pinto / 22; Paulo Guerra / 25; (Alfredo Bráz) / (56); (Alberto Maravilha) / (65) | 69 |
| 4 | Spain | 86 |
| 5 | Tanzania | 94 |
| 6 | United Kingdom | 156 |
| 7 | Italy | 163 |
| 8 | Algeria | 167 |
Full results

- Note: Athletes in parentheses did not score for the team result

=== Men's short race (4.18 km) ===
Individual race
| Rank | Athlete | Country | Time |
|---|---|---|---|
| 1st place, gold medalist(s) | John Kibowen | Kenya | 11:11 |
| 2nd place, silver medalist(s) | Sammy Kipketer | Kenya | 11:12 |
| 3rd place, bronze medalist(s) | Paul Kosgei | Kenya | 11:15 |
| 4 | Leonard Mucheru | Kenya | 11:21 |
| 5 | Abraham Chebii | Kenya | 11:25 |
| 6 | Haylu Mekonnen | Ethiopia | 11:27 |
| 7 | Philip Mosima | Kenya | 11:29 |
| 8 | Saïd El Wardi | Morocco | 11:33 |
| 9 | Laïd Bessou | Algeria | 11:34 |
| 10 | Sergiy Lebid | Ukraine | 11:36 |
| 11 | Abiyote Abate | Ethiopia | 11:36 |
| 12 | Martin Sulle | Tanzania | 11:37 |
Full results

Teams
| Rank | Team | Points |
|---|---|---|
| 1st place, gold medalist(s) | Kenya: John Kibowen / 1; Sammy Kipketer / 2; Paul Kosgei / 3; Leonard Mucheru / 4; (Abraham Chebii) / (5); (Philip Mosima) / (7) | 10 |
| 2nd place, silver medalist(s) | Ethiopia: Haylu Mekonnen / 6; Abiyote Abate / 11; Dagne Alemu / 14; Million Wolde / 15; (Daniel Zegeye) / (32); (Mohamed Awol) / (43) | 46 |
| 3rd place, bronze medalist(s) | Morocco: Saïd El Wardi / 8; Ali Ezzine / 13; Aziz Driouche / 18; Youssef Baba / 29; (Salah El Ghazi) / (40); (Abdelhak El Gorch) / (108) | 68 |
| 4 | Algeria | 88 |
| 5 | Portugal | 100 |
| 6 | Spain | 130 |
| 7 | Tanzania | 136 |
| 8 | Germany | 166 |
Full results

- Note: Athletes in parentheses did not score for the team result

=== Junior men's race (8.08 km) ===
Individual race
| Rank | Athlete | Country | Time |
|---|---|---|---|
| 1st place, gold medalist(s) | Robert Kipchumba | Kenya | 22:49 |
| 2nd place, silver medalist(s) | Duncan Lebo | Kenya | 22:52 |
| 3rd place, bronze medalist(s) | John Cheruiyot Korir | Kenya | 22:55 |
| 4 | Philemon Kemei | Kenya | 23:04 |
| 5 | Martin Sulle | Tanzania | 23:14 |
| 6 | Faustin Baha | Tanzania | 23:27 |
| 7 | Edwin Koech | Kenya | 23:33 |
| 8 | Beruk Debrework | Ethiopia | 23:40 |
| 9 | Teref Dessalege | Ethiopia | 23:51 |
| 10 | Kiplimo Muneria | Kenya | 24:03 |
| 11 | Martin Toroitich | Uganda | 24:08 |
| 12 | Alemayehu Lema | Ethiopia | 24:14 |
Full results

Teams
| Rank | Team | Points |
|---|---|---|
| 1st place, gold medalist(s) | Kenya: Robert Kipchumba / 1; Duncan Lebo / 2; John Cheruiyot Korir / 3; Philemon Kemei / 4; (Edwin Koech) / (7); (Kiplimo Muneria) / (10) | 10 |
| 2nd place, silver medalist(s) | Ethiopia: Beruk Debrework / 8; Teref Dessalege / 9; Alemayehu Lema / 12; Midekssa Diriba / 18; (Demissie Girma) / (31); (Tadesse Feyissa) / (65) | 47 |
| 3rd place, bronze medalist(s) | Uganda: Martin Toroitich / 11; Paul Wakou / 15; Job Sikoria / 20; Johnny Okello / 22; (Boniface Kiprop) / (27) | 68 |
| 4 | Tanzania | 84 |
| 5 | Qatar | 98 |
| 6 | Morocco | 105 |
| 7 | Japan | 125 |
| 8 | South Africa | 151 |
Full results

- Note: Athletes in parentheses did not score for the team result

=== Senior women's race (8.08 km) ===
Individual race
| Rank | Athlete | Country | Time |
|---|---|---|---|
| 1st place, gold medalist(s) | Derartu Tulu | Ethiopia | 25:42 |
| 2nd place, silver medalist(s) | Gete Wami | Ethiopia | 25:48 |
| 3rd place, bronze medalist(s) | Susan Chepkemei | Kenya | 25:50 |
| 4 | Lydia Cheromei | Kenya | 26:02 |
| 5 | Paula Radcliffe | United Kingdom | 26:03 |
| 6 | Leah Malot | Kenya | 26:09 |
| 7 | Sonia O'Sullivan | Ireland | 26:20 |
| 8 | Merima Denboba | Ethiopia | 26:23 |
| 9 | Ayelech Worku | Ethiopia | 26:36 |
| 10 | Ruth Kutol | Kenya | 26:38 |
| 11 | Irene Kipchumba | Kenya | 26:45 |
| 12 | Deena Drossin | United States | 26:59 |
Full results

Teams
| Rank | Team | Points |
|---|---|---|
| 1st place, gold medalist(s) | Ethiopia: Derartu Tulu / 1; Gete Wami / 2; Merima Denboba / 8; Ayelech Worku / 9; (Berhane Adere) / (14); (Asha Gigi) / (28) | 20 |
| 2nd place, silver medalist(s) | Kenya: Susan Chepkemei / 3; Lydia Cheromei / 4; Leah Malot / 6; Ruth Kutol / 10; (Irene Kipchumba) / (11); (Magdeline Chemjor) / (25) | 23 |
| 3rd place, bronze medalist(s) | United States: Deena Drossin / 12; Jen Rhines / 13; Rachel Sauder / 36; Kimberly Fitchen / 37; (Donna Garcia) / (55); (Elva Dryer) / (DNF) | 98 |
| 4 | Ireland | 101 |
| 5 | Spain | 137 |
| 6 | United Kingdom | 137 |
| 7 | Japan | 148 |
| 8 | Italy | 164 |
Full results

- Note: Athletes in parentheses did not score for the team result

=== Women's short race (4.18 km) ===
Individual race
| Rank | Athlete | Country | Time |
|---|---|---|---|
| 1st place, gold medalist(s) | Kutre Dulecha | Ethiopia | 13:00 |
| 2nd place, silver medalist(s) | Zahra Ouaziz | Morocco | 13:00 |
| 3rd place, bronze medalist(s) | Margaret Ngotho | Kenya | 13:00 |
| 4 | Paula Radcliffe | United Kingdom | 13:01 |
| 5 | Fatima Yvelain | France | 13:06 |
| 6 | Yimenashu Taye | Ethiopia | 13:07 |
| 7 | Carla Sacramento | Portugal | 13:12 |
| 8 | Sally Barsosio | Kenya | 13:16 |
| 9 | Zhor El Kamch | Morocco | 13:17 |
| 10 | Fernanda Ribeiro | Portugal | 13:17 |
| 11 | Yamna Belkacem | France | 13:21 |
| 12 | Rose Cheruiyot | Kenya | 13:22 |
Full results

Teams
| Rank | Team | Points |
|---|---|---|
| 1st place, gold medalist(s) | Portugal: Carla Sacramento / 7; Fernanda Ribeiro / 10; Helena Sampaio / 13; Marina Bastos / 16; (Inês Monteiro) / (29); (Anália Rosa) / (45) | 46 |
| 2nd place, silver medalist(s) | Ethiopia: Kutre Dulecha / 1; Yimenashu Taye / 6; Getenesh Urge / 17; Genet Gebregiorgis / 31; (Zenebech Tadese) / (37); (Lulit Legesse) / (38) | 55 |
| 3rd place, bronze medalist(s) | France: Fatima Yvelain / 5; Yamna Belkacem / 11; Blandine Bitzner-Ducret / 18; Rakiya Maraoui / 23; (Laurence Duquénoy) / (30); (Fatima Hajjami) / (54) | 57 |
| 4 | Kenya | 59 |
| 5 | Morocco | 81 |
| 6 | Romania | 122 |
| 7 | United Kingdom | 138 |
| 8 | Germany | 149 |
Full results

- Note: Athletes in parentheses did not score for the team result

=== Junior women's race (6.29 km) ===
Individual race
| Rank | Athlete | Country | Time |
|---|---|---|---|
| 1st place, gold medalist(s) | Vivian Cheruiyot | Kenya | 20:34 |
| 2nd place, silver medalist(s) | Alice Timbilil | Kenya | 20:35 |
| 3rd place, bronze medalist(s) | Viola Kibiwott | Kenya | 20:36 |
| 4 | Hareg Sidelil | Ethiopia | 20:38 |
| 5 | Merima Hashim | Ethiopia | 20:41 |
| 6 | Fridah Domongole | Kenya | 20:43 |
| 7 | Eyerusalem Kuma | Ethiopia | 20:45 |
| 8 | Abebech Nigussie | Ethiopia | 20:48 |
| 9 | Worknesh Kidane | Ethiopia | 20:52 |
| 10 | Dorcus Inzikuru | Uganda | 21:02 |
| 11 | Rina Fujioka | Japan | 21:12 |
| 12 | Pamela Kipchoge | Kenya | 21:19 |
Full results

Teams
| Rank | Team | Points |
|---|---|---|
| 1st place, gold medalist(s) | Kenya: Vivian Cheruiyot / 1; Alice Timbilil / 2; Viola Kibiwott / 3; Fridah Domongole / 6; (Pamela Kipchoge) / (12); (Gladys Ruto) / (34) | 12 |
| 2nd place, silver medalist(s) | Ethiopia: Hareg Sidelil / 4; Merima Hashim / 5; Eyerusalem Kuma / 7; Abebech Nigussie / 8; (Worknesh Kidane) / (9); (Bezunesh Bekele) / (13) | 24 |
| 3rd place, bronze medalist(s) | Japan: Rina Fujioka / 11; Kaori Yoshida / 14; Tomomi Tagao / 20; Ikuko Nagao / 33; (Mami Ikeda) / (50); (Naoko Sakata) / (DNF) | 78 |
| 4 | South Africa | 105 |
| 5 | Uganda | 131 |
| 6 | United States | 146 |
| 7 | Algeria | 155 |
| 8 | Canada | 184 |
Full results

- Note: Athletes in parentheses did not score for the team result

== Medal table (unofficial) ==
The host country is highlighted in lavender blue

| Rank | Nation | Gold | Silver | Bronze | Total |
|---|---|---|---|---|---|
| 1 | Kenya | 7 | 4 | 6 | 17 |
| 2 | Ethiopia | 3 | 7 | 0 | 10 |
| 3 | Portugal* | 1 | 0 | 1 | 2 |
| 4 | Belgium | 1 | 0 | 0 | 1 |
| 5 | Morocco | 0 | 1 | 1 | 2 |
| 6 | France | 0 | 0 | 1 | 1 |
| 6 | Japan | 0 | 0 | 1 | 1 |
| 6 | Uganda | 0 | 0 | 1 | 1 |
| 6 | United States | 0 | 0 | 1 | 1 |
| Totals (9 entries) | | 12 | 12 | 12 | 36 |

- Note: Totals include both individual and team medals, with medals in the team competition counting as one medal.

== Participation ==
An unofficial count yields the participation of 805 athletes from 76 countries, one athlete less than the official number published. The announced athletes from Cameroon, Equatorial Guinea, Guatemala, Iran, and Trinidad and Tobago did not show.

- Algeria (24)
- Andorra (3)
- Argentina (2)
- Australia (4)
- Austria (1)
- Azerbaijan (2)
- Belarus (24)
- Belgium (17)
- Bolivia (1)
- Bosnia and Herzegovina (1)
- Botswana (5)
- Brazil (20)
- Burundi (2)
- Canada (34)
- Cape Verde (3)
- Chile (2)
- Colombia (10)
- Croatia (2)
- Denmark (1)
- Ecuador (8)
- Egypt (7)
- Eritrea (9)
- Estonia (2)
- Ethiopia (36)
- Finland (10)
- France (20)
- Georgia (1)
- Germany (11)
- Gibraltar (12)
- India (20)
- Ireland (17)
- Israel (1)
- Italy (25)
- Japan (22)
- Kazakhstan (2)
- Kenya (36)
- Kiribati (4)
- Kyrgyzstan (3)
- Lebanon (10)
- Lesotho (2)
- Mexico (6)
- Morocco (29)
- Nepal (2)
- Netherlands (11)
- New Zealand (7)
- Norway (8)
- Palestine (5)
- Poland (3)
- Portugal (34)
- Qatar (12)
- Romania (7)
- Russia (17)
- Rwanda (5)
- Seychelles (1)
- Slovakia (2)
- Slovenia (4)
- South Africa (14)
- Spain (36)
- Eswatini (1)
- Sweden (4)
- Switzerland (2)
- Tajikistan (7)
- Tanzania (19)
- Tunisia (8)
- Turkey (6)
- Turkmenistan (15)
- Uganda (10)
- Ukraine (1)
- United Kingdom (35)
- United States (35)
- Uzbekistan (20)
- Venezuela (6)
- Yemen (4)
- Yugoslavia (4)
- Zambia (4)
- Zimbabwe (5)

== See also ==
- 2000 IAAF World Cross Country Championships – Senior men's race
- 2000 IAAF World Cross Country Championships – Men's short race
- 2000 IAAF World Cross Country Championships – Junior men's race
- 2000 IAAF World Cross Country Championships – Senior women's race
- 2000 IAAF World Cross Country Championships – Women's short race
- 2000 IAAF World Cross Country Championships – Junior women's race
- 2000 in athletics (track and field)
