= Ambesse Tolosa =

Ethiopian long-distance runner

Ambesse Tolosa (born 28 August 1977 in Shewa) is an Ethiopian long-distance runner, who specializes in the marathon race.

Tolosa tested positive for banned substances in February 2008 and received a two-year ban from competitive athletics. The substance that was present in his system (morphine) was not a performance-enhancing drug and Tolosa said that he did not know how it had gotten into his body, but the IAAF rules stated that athletes received bans regardless of intent. His results from 9 December 2007 onwards were annulled, which included his win at the Honolulu Marathon that year.

== Achievements ==
Year	Competition	Venue	Position	Event	Notes
Representing Ethiopia
1998	Hokkaido Marathon	Sapporo, Japan	1st	Marathon	2:10:13
1999	World Championships	Seville, Spain	13th	Marathon	2:16:45
2000	World Cross Country Championships	Vilamoura	2nd	Team	
2000	Rotterdam Marathon	Rotterdam, Netherlands	8th	Marathon	2:10:57
2001	Beijing Marathon	Beijing, PR China	5th	Marathon	2:10:37
2002	Amsterdam Marathon	Amsterdam, Netherlands	7th	Marathon	2:10:09
2003	World Championships	Paris, France	19th	Marathon	2:12:19
2004	Paris Marathon	Paris, France	1st	Marathon	2:08:56
2004	Olympic Games	Athens, Greece	15th	Marathon	2:15:39
2005	World Championships	Helsinki, Finland	19th	Marathon	2:16:36
2006	Rock 'n' Roll San Diego Marathon	San Diego, United States	1st	Marathon	2:10:08
2006	Tokyo Marathon	Tokyo, Japan	1st	Marathon	2:08:58
2006	Honolulu Marathon	Honolulu, Hawaii	1st	Marathon	2:13:42
2007	World Championships	Osaka, Japan	38th	Marathon	2:30:20

== Personal bests ==
Surface	Event	Time (h:min:s)	Venue	Date
Road	10 km	27:56	Groesbeek, Netherlands	10 June 2000
Road	Half marathon	1:02:19	Brussels, Belgium	5 May 2002
Road	25 km	1:15:31	Tokyo, Japan	12 February 2006
Road	30 km	1:30:43	Rotterdam, Netherlands	24 April 2002
Road	Marathon	2:08:56	Paris, France	4 April 2004

- All information taken from IAAF profile.
