= Kaori Yoshida =

Japanese long-distance runner

Kaori Yoshida (吉田 香織, Yoshida Kaori; born August 4, 1981) is a Japanese long-distance runner and marathon athlete. She is a Salomon footwear ambassador.

== Early life and family ==
Yoshida was born on August 4, 1981. She graduated from Saitama Prefectural Kawagoe Girls' High School in 2000. While there, she participated in the National Sports Festival of Japan in 1999, the year it was held in Kumamoto. Her parents live there for work.

== Career ==
=== Sekisui Chemical/Shiseido ===
After graduating from high school in 2000, Yoshida joined the Sekisui Chemical team at the invitation of Yoshio Koide. At the time, she was nicknamed Ushiwakamaru (Ushiwakamaru) because of her hopping running form. She also competed as a member of the Japanese national team in the International Chiba Ekiden and the Yokohama International Women's Ekiden.

Later, when Koide and Naoko Takahashi left Sekisui Chemical, Yoshida moved to the Shiseido team in 2003. In 2005, she accompanied her teammate Kiyoko Shimahara when she ran in the Hokkaido Marathon. Yoshida was so impressed by the support she received there that she decided to make Hokkaido her first marathon.

The Hokkaido Marathon, held on August 27, 2006, also served as a qualifying race for the 2007 World Championships. In the scorching heat of over 30 degrees Celsius, Yoshida took the lead from the middle of the race, winning her first marathon and also receiving the Newcomer of the Year award. However, her time was shorter than the 2 hours and 26 minutes required for the event, so she was not selected. Other competitors achieved better times in the subsequent qualifying races, leading to speculation in newspapers that she would not be selected.

In February 2007, Yoshida tried appeal by competing in the Kumamoto Nichinichi 30km Road Race, which was held just before the selection of the Japanese representatives for the World Championships marathon. She showed determination to secure her place until the very end, but her time was judged to be inferior to that of the other runners in weather conditions similar to those at the World Championships, and she was not selected for the team. (Incidentally, Yoshida has a strong connection with Kumamoto, as she participated in the National Sports Festival there and her parents live in there for work, according to a local newspaper report.)

=== Second Wind AC Years ===
In order to start anew, on April 1, 2007, Yoshida transferred to Second Wind AC (SWAC), founded by Manabu Kawagoe, former head coach of the Shiseido Running Club.

At the Hokkaido Marathon held on September 9 of that year, she served as a special guest commentator for the previous year's winners, alongside Tomoaki Ogura and others (the women's winner was Yuri Kanō, also a member of SWAC). Yoshida also publicly stated she would aim to be selected for the women's marathon at the Beijing Olympics in the Nagoya International Women's Marathon on March 9, 2008.

During the Nagoya International Women's Marathon, Yoshida stayed with the slow-paced lead pack until the middle of the race, but dropped out after the 28km mark due to an accident in which blisters on both her feet burst and bled. Although she set a personal best at the time, she finished 12th.

Yoshida competed in the Hokkaido Marathon on August 31, 2008, which also served as a selection event for the 2009 World Championships. She was aiming for her first win in two years, but was unable to keep up with the pace of winner Yukari Saeki (Aruze AC) and others in the first half of the race, and fell behind. Although Yoshida gradually made up ground midway through the race, she ultimately finished in third place.

On December 14, 2008, she participated in the Honolulu Marathon as an invited runner and served as a pacemaker. She finished second behind fellow SWAC athlete Kiyoko Shimahara making this the first time two Japanese women achieved a one-two finish in the marathon.

She also participated in the Osaka International Women's Marathon on January 25, 2009, as an invited runner, but withdrew after the 5km mark due to poor health.

=== Time with Amino Vital AC ===
On March 15, 2009, Yoshida left SWAC, announcing her transfer to Amino Vital AC, home to Mari Tanigawa, her former senior at Shiseido. On August 30 of the same year, she competed in the Hokkaido Marathon, her first full marathon as an Amino Vital AC athlete, finishing 11th.

At the Tokyo Marathon on February 28, 2010, Yoshida was 800 meters from the finish line when she lost consciousness due to hypothermia caused by cold rain and collapsed, forcing her to retire. At the Gold Coast Marathon in Australia on July 4 of that year, despite being anemic and not in top physical condition, she won the women's division by more than five minutes over the second-place runner. At the Chicago Marathon on October 10, Yoshida set her first personal best of under 2 hours and 30 minutes, finishing in eighth place, but as the top Japanese woman. At the Honolulu Marathon on December 12 of the same year, she finished in third place, the top Japanese woman.

Yoshida broke away midway through the Hokkaido Marathon on August 28, 2011, and briefly ran alone. At the 30-km mark, she had a lead of nearly three minutes over the second-place group, but then slowed down. Yoshida was overtaken by eventual winner Tomo Morimoto just before the 40km mark, and was then by Shimahara Kiyoko and Shibui Yoko, ultimately finishing in fourth place.

At the Beppu-Oita Marathon in February 2012, Yoshida served as pacemaker for Hiroshi Neko, who later competed in the men's marathon at the Rio Olympics in August 2016, finishing as a representative of Cambodia. With the aim of representing Japan in the women's marathon at the London Olympics, she competed in the Yokohama International and the Nagoya Women's Marathons, both of which served as domestic qualifying events, but her finishing times and placements were mediocre.

=== Doping violation ===
On May 23, 2013, the Japan Anti-Doping Agency (JADA) announced that Yoshida had been suspended for one year, effective January 18, for a doping violation. Her results at the Honolulu Marathon in December 2012, where she placed fourth, were also invalidated due to a positive test for erythropoietin (EPO), a protein that enhances endurance. On August 20, 2013, the Japan Sports Arbitration Agency ruled that Yoshida should be suspended for two years.

During her suspension, she joined and served as manager of the club team "Team Runners Pulse," affiliated with the magazine Runners Pulse (Sogeisha).

=== Time with Team Runners Pulse ===
In her comeback race, Yoshida placed 11th at the Seoul International Marathon in March 2015 and second at the Hokkaido Marathon in August.

On November 15, 2015, she placed second in the Saitama International Marathon, the first national qualifying event for the Rio de Janeiro Olympic women's marathon. However, Yoshida finished exactly three minutes behind the winner, Atsede Bayisa of Ethiopia, and her finishing time of 2:28, approximately six minutes slower than the Japan Association of Athletics Federations' Olympic qualifying record of 2:22:30, making her chances of representing Japan at the Rio Olympics slim. She also entered the Nagoya Women's Marathon, the final qualifying event for the Rio Olympics women's marathon, on March 13, 2016, as a general participant, but withdrew due to an injury.

In May 2016, Yoshida ran 65.71 kilometers at the Wings for Life World Run, becoming the women's world champion.

=== While a member of TEAM R×L ===
In August 2016, she transferred to Takeda Legwear's running club, TEAM R×L. That same month, she won the Hokkaido Marathon for the second time in 10 years.

Takeda was awarded the Marathon Challenge Cup Citizen's Award in November 2018 in the Women's Record Breaking Division for setting a new record at the Mito Komon Man'yu Marathon.

In December 2018, at the 4th Saitama International Marathon, an eligible race for the MGC women, she led the first 25 km as a race spacer, with 5 km laps of 17'12" → 17'20" → 17'21" → 17'28" → 17'24", while the domestic-invited runners dropped away from the leading group, keeping the pace steady and aiming to qualify for the MGC.

In 2019, Yoshida came in sixth at the 5th Saitama International Marathon, setting a record at 2:35:15.

== Image ==
At the 2006 Hokkaido Marathon, Yoshida had her nails painted pink. She showed them off as a sign of her victory to the television cameras after crossing the finish line.
