= Edwin Koech =

Kenyan middle-distance runner

Personal information
- Nationality: Kenyan
- Born: 23 July 1961 (age 64)

Sport
- Sport: Middle-distance running
- Event: 800 metres

Edwin Koech (born 23 July 1961) is a Kenyan middle-distance runner. He competed in the men's 800 metres at the 1984 Summer Olympics.

Competing for the Richmond Spiders track and field team, Koech won the 1983 1000 yards at the NCAA Division I Indoor Track and Field Championships.
