= Martin Sulle =

Tanzanian long-distance runner

Martin Hhaway Sulle (born 28 December 1982) is a Tanzanian long-distance runner who specializes in the half marathon.

He made his international debut at the 1999 IAAF World Cross Country Championships, where he was 15th in the junior race. He competed at the event the following year in Vilamoura, Portugal and was fifth in the junior race. He also made his global senior debut as he ran in the men's short race, finishing in twelfth.

He was the winner of the inaugural edition of the Oeiras International Cross Country race in late 2000. He also won half marathon races in Portugal, taking the 2001 Cidade de Ovar Half Marathon title and the Setúbal Half Marathon with a course record time of 1:01:25.

He won a bronze medal at the 2003 World Half Marathon Championships which was also held in Vilamoura. Shortly after, he won the Giro al Sas di Trento 10K race in Italy. He was the 2006 winner of the Humarathon in France. He was the silver medallist in the half marathon at the 2007 All-Africa Games, finishing runner-up to Deriba Merga. He returned to the global stage after a long absence at the 2010 IAAF World Cross Country Championships and placed 41st in the men's senior race.

== Achievements ==
Year	Competition	Venue	Position	Notes
2000	World Cross Country Championships	Vilamoura, Portugal	12th	Short race
2002	Commonwealth Games	Manchester, England	8th	10,000 m, 28:15.60 PB
2003	World Half Marathon Championships	Vilamoura, Portugal	3rd	Half marathon
2007	All-Africa Games	Algiers, Algeria	2nd	Half marathon

=== Personal bests ===
- 10,000 metres - 28:15.60 min (2002)
- Half marathon - 1:00:29 hrs (2004)
