= Sergey Zabavsky =

Tajikistani long-distance runner

Sergey Zabavsky (born 15 January 1974) is a former Tajik long-distance runner who competed in the 2000 Summer Olympics in the marathon competition. He finished 68th with a time of 2:30:29.

He competed at six editions of the IAAF World Cross Country Championships from 1997 to 2002.
