= Sergey Fedotov =

Russian long-distance runner

Personal information
- Born: February 12, 1972 (age 54)

Sport
- Sport: Track and field
Medal record
Representing Russia
Summer Universiade
Silver medal – second place	1993 Buffalo	5000m

Sergey Fedotov (Russian: Серге́й Федотов; born February 12, 1972) is a Russian former long-distance runner. He competed in the 1991, 1997 and 2000 IAAF World Cross Country Championships. He also won the 2005 California International Marathon.

== Marathons ==
Year	Competition	Venue	Position	Notes
Representing Russia
2000	Twin Cities Marathon	Minneapolis-Saint Paul, United States	1st	Marathon
2005	California International Marathon	California State Capitol, United States	1st	Marathon
