= 2002 IAAF World Cross Country Championships – Senior women's race =

Senior women's race at the 2002 IAAF World Cross Country Championships
- Organisers: IAAF
- Edition: 30th
- Date: March 23
- Host city: Dublin, Leinster, Ireland (Republic of Ireland)
- Venue: Leopardstown Racecourse
- Events: 1
- Distances: 7.974 km – Senior women
- Participation: 83 athletes from 21 nations

The Senior women's race at the 2002 IAAF World Cross Country Championships was held at the Leopardstown Racecourse near Dublin, Ireland, on March 23, 2002. Reports of the event were given in The New York Times, in the Herald, and for the IAAF.

Complete results for individuals, for senior women's teams, medallists, and the results of British athletes who took part were published.

== Race results ==
=== Senior women's race (7.974 km) ===
==== Individual ====
Rank	Athlete	Country	Time
1st place, gold medalist(s)	Paula Radcliffe	United Kingdom	26:55
2nd place, silver medalist(s)	Deena Drossin	United States	27:04
3rd place, bronze medalist(s)	Colleen de Reuck	United States	27:17
4	Miwako Yamanaka	Japan	27:19
5	Eyerusalem Kuma	Ethiopia	27:19
6	Merima Denboba	Ethiopia	27:21
7	Leila Aman	Ethiopia	27:25
8	Rose Cheruiyot	Kenya	27:28
9	Pamela Chepchumba	Kenya	27:30
10	Teyiba Erkesso	Ethiopia	27:32
11	Leah Malot	Kenya	27:35
12	Jen Rhines	United States	27:43
13	Ayelech Worku	Ethiopia	27:50
14	Jane Omoro	Kenya	27:52
15	Kayoko Fukushi	Japan	27:53
16	Jepkorir Ayabei	Kenya	27:58
17	Rosanna Martin	Italy	27:59
18	Liz Yelling	United Kingdom	28:07
19	Helena Sampaio	Portugal	28:08
20	Kathy Butler	United Kingdom	28:12
21	Yoshiko Fujinaga	Japan	28:15
22	Anália Rosa	Portugal	28:16
23	Milena Glusac	United States	28:18
24	Maria Luisa Lárraga	Spain	28:21
25	Ana Dias	Portugal	28:24
26	Analídia Torre	Portugal	28:24
27	Beatriz Santíago	Spain	28:26
28	Elva Dryer	United States	28:27
29	Rodica Moroianu	France	28:30
30	Atalelech Ketema	Ethiopia	28:33
31	Amy Rudolph	United States	28:37
32	Carmen Oliveras	France	28:41
33	Inês Monteiro	Portugal	28:42
34	María Abel	Spain	28:43
35	Alessandra Aguilar	Spain	28:43
36	Kazue Ogoshi	Japan	28:43
37	Nebiat Habtemariam	Eritrea	28:47
38	Rosita Rota Gelpi	Italy	28:51
39	Anja Smolders	Belgium	28:53
40	Fatima Hajjami	France	28:56
41	Rocío Ríos	Spain	28:57
42	Hayley Yelling	United Kingdom	29:00
43	Monica Wangari	Kenya	29:00
44	Fatima Yvelain	France	29:00
45	Marie McMahon	Ireland	29:07
46	Angela Mudge	United Kingdom	29:07
47	Lisa Harvey	Canada	29:08
48	Elodie Olivares	France	29:15
49	Charné Rademeyer	South Africa	29:18
50	Teresa Recio	Spain	29:19
51	Natalya Berkut	Ukraine	29:21
52	Kim Smith	New Zealand	29:24
53	Stephanie de Croock	Belgium	29:27
54	Nives Curti	Italy	29:28
55	Marina Bastos	Portugal	29:32
56	Patrizia Tisi	Italy	29:35
57	Sarah Dupré	Canada	29:36
58	Orla O'Mahoney	Ireland	29:42
59	Jenny Brown	United Kingdom	29:52
60	Veerle van Linden	Belgium	29:52
61	Alison Rendell	Canada	29:58
62	América Mateos	Mexico	30:02
63	Pauline Curley	Ireland	30:04
64	Cathérine Lallemand	Belgium	30:15
65	Monia Capelli	Italy	30:21
66	Barbara Brych	Canada	30:32
67	Hannah Lawrence	New Zealand	30:42
68	Teresa Duffy	Ireland	31:02
69	Corinne Debaets	Belgium	31:18
70	Michaela McClure	Canada	31:21
71	Geraldine Hendricken	Ireland	31:40
72	Irina Matrosova	Uzbekistan	31:48
73	Margareth Iro	Tanzania	32:08
74	Margaret Danagher	Ireland	32:25
75	Priscilla Mamba	Eswatini	33:03
76	Yuliya Arfipova	Uzbekistan	33:18
77	Zamira Amirova	Uzbekistan	33:56
78	Kanchanamala Udagedara	Sri Lanka	33:59
79	Daulgoda Inoka	Sri Lanka	33:59
80	Yekaterina Dirova	Uzbekistan	34:23
81	Malika Chandrakanthi	Sri Lanka	34:48
—	Zahia Dahmani	France	DNF
—	Suzanne Binne	Canada	DNF
—	Sandra Baumann	Austria	DNS
—	Anesie Kwizera	Burundi	DNS
—	Gulsara Dadabaeva	Tajikistan	DNS
—	Taussi Juma	Tanzania	DNS
—	Banuelia Katesigwa	Tanzania	DNS

==== Teams ====
Rank	Team	Points
1st place, gold medalist(s)	Ethiopia: Eyerusalem Kuma / 5; Merima Denboba / 6; Leila Aman / 7; Teyiba Erkesso / 10; (Ayelech Worku) / (n/s); (Atalelech Ketema) / (n/s)	28
2nd place, silver medalist(s)	United States: Deena Drossin / 2; Colleen de Reuck / 3; Jen Rhines / 12; Milena Glusac / 21; (Elva Dryer) / (n/s); (Amy Rudolph) / (n/s)	38
3rd place, bronze medalist(s)	Kenya: Rose Cheruiyot / 8; Pamela Chepchumba / 9; Leah Malot / 11; Jane Omoro / 13; (Jepkorir Ayabei) / (n/s); (Monica Wangari) / (n/s)	41
4	Japan: Miwako Yamanaka / 4; Kayoko Fukushi / 14; Yoshiko Fujinaga / 19; Kazue Ogoshi / 30	67
5	United Kingdom: Paula Radcliffe / 1; Liz Yelling / 16; Kathy Butler / 18; Hayley Yelling / 34; (Angela Mudge) / (n/s); (Jenny Brown) / (n/s)	69
6	Portugal: Helena Sampaio / 17; Anália Rosa / 20; Ana Dias / 23; Analídia Torre / 24; (Inês Monteiro) / (n/s); (Marina Bastos) / (n/s)	84
7	Spain: Maria Luisa Lárraga / 22; Beatriz Santíago / 25; María Abel / 28; Alessandra Aguilar / 29; (Rocío Ríos) / (n/s); (Teresa Recio) / (n/s)	104
8	France: Rodica Moroianu / 26; Carmen Oliveras / 27; Fatima Hajjami / 33; Fatima Yvelain / 35; (Elodie Olivares) / (n/s); (Zahia Dahmani) / (DNF)	121
9	Italy: Rosanna Martin / 15; Rosita Rota Gelpi / 31; Nives Curti / 39; Patrizia Tisi / 40; (Monia Capelli) / (n/s)	125
10	Belgium: Anja Smolders / 32; Stephanie de Croock / 38; Veerle van Linden / 43; Cathérine Lallemand / 46; (Corinne Debaets) / (n/s)	159
11	Canada: Lisa Harvey / 37; Sarah Dupré / 41; Alison Rendell / 44; Barbara Brych / 47; (Michaela McClure) / (n/s); (Suzanne Binne) / (DNF)	169
12	Ireland: Marie McMahon / 36; Orla O'Mahoney / 42; Pauline Curley / 45; Teresa Duffy / 48; (Geraldine Hendricken) / (n/s); (Margaret Danagher) / (n/s)	171
13	Uzbekistan: Irina Matrosova / 49; Yuliya Arfipova / 50; Zamira Amirova / 51; Yekaterina Dirova / 52	202

- Note: Athletes in parentheses did not score for the team result (n/s: nonscorer)

== Participation ==
According to an unofficial count, 83 athletes from 21 countries participated in the Senior women's race. The announced athletes from Austria, Burundi, and Tajikistan did not show.

- Belgium (5)
- Canada (6)
- Eritrea (1)
- Ethiopia (6)
- France (6)
- Ireland (6)
- Italy (5)
- Japan (4)
- Kenya (6)
- Mexico (1)
- New Zealand (2)
- Portugal (6)
- South Africa (1)
- Spain (6)
- Sri Lanka (3)
- Eswatini (1)
- Tanzania (1)
- Ukraine (1)
- United Kingdom (6)
- United States (6)
- Uzbekistan (4)

== See also ==
- 2002 IAAF World Cross Country Championships – Senior men's race
- 2002 IAAF World Cross Country Championships – Men's short race
- 2002 IAAF World Cross Country Championships – Junior men's race
- 2002 IAAF World Cross Country Championships – Women's short race
- 2002 IAAF World Cross Country Championships – Junior women's race
