= 2002 IAAF World Cross Country Championships – Women's short race =

Women's short race at the 2002 IAAF World Cross Country Championships
- Organisers: IAAF
- Edition: 30th
- Date: March 24
- Host city: Dublin, Leinster, Ireland (Republic of Ireland)
- Venue: Leopardstown Racecourse
- Events: 6
- Distances: 4.208 km – Women's short
- Participation: 107 athletes from 29 nations

The Women's short race at the 2002 IAAF World Cross Country Championships was held at the Leopardstown Racecourse near Dublin, Ireland, on March 24, 2002. Reports of the event were given in The New York Times, in the Herald, and for the IAAF.

Complete results for individuals, for teams, medallists, and the results of British athletes who took part were published.

== Race results ==
=== Women's short race (4.208 km) ===
==== Individual ====
Rank	Athlete	Country	Time
1st place, gold medalist(s)	Edith Masai	Kenya	13:30
2nd place, silver medalist(s)	Worknesh Kidane	Ethiopia	13:36
3rd place, bronze medalist(s)	Isabella Ochichi	Kenya	13:39
4	Benita Johnson	Australia	13:42
5	Suzy Favor Hamilton	United States	13:47
6	Abebech Nigussie	Ethiopia	13:53
7	Sonia O'Sullivan	Ireland	13:55
8	Amane Godana	Ethiopia	14:00
9	Rosanna Martin	Italy	14:01
10	Anne Keenan-Buckley	Ireland	14:03
11	Carrie Tollefson	United States	14:05
12	Bouchra Chaâbi	Morocco	14:06
13	Nancy Wambui	Kenya	14:06
14	Olga Romanova	Russia	14:06
15	Anna Thompson	Australia	14:07
16	Genet Gebregiorgis	Ethiopia	14:08
17	Jane Kiptoo	Kenya	14:11
18	Prisca Ngetich	Kenya	14:13
19	Rosemary Ryan	Ireland	14:14
20	Helena Sampaio	Portugal	14:15
21	Hawa Hamis Hussein	Tanzania	14:17
22	Helen Pattinson	United Kingdom	14:18
23	Liliya Volkova	Russia	14:19
24	Anastasiya Zubova	Russia	14:20
25	Carla Sacramento	Portugal	14:20
26	Meryem Karouani	Morocco	14:22
27	Hana Chaouach	Tunisia	14:22
28	Albina Ivanova	Russia	14:23
29	Denisa Costescu	Romania	14:25
30	Hayley McGregor	Australia	14:25
31	Olga Machado	Portugal	14:26
32	Sarah Toland	United States	14:27
33	Nasria Azaïdj	Algeria	14:27
34	Merima Hashim	Ethiopia	14:28
35	Lucy Elliott	United Kingdom	14:28
36	Jacqueline Martín	Spain	14:28
37	Fatiha Baouf	Belgium	14:29
38	Sinkinesh Gudeta	Ethiopia	14:30
39	Adélia Elias	Portugal	14:31
40	Judit Plá	Spain	14:32
41	Elena Fidatof	Romania	14:33
42	Natalie Harvey	Australia	14:34
43	Ronel Thomas	South Africa	14:35
44	Anesie Kwizera	Burundi	14:36
45	Hiromi Koga	Japan	14:37
46	Sandra Baumann	Austria	14:38
47	Daniela Petrescu	Romania	14:40
48	Zubeda Gussi	Tanzania	14:41
49	Émilie Mondor	Canada	14:42
50	Farida Gusi	Tanzania	14:42
51	Minori Hayakari	Japan	14:42
52	Janet Trujillo	United States	14:42
53	Carmen Douma	Canada	14:44
54	Tatyana Borisova	Kyrgyzstan	14:44
55	Seloua Ouaziz	Morocco	14:44
56	Clarisse Cruz	Portugal	14:44
57	Rocío Martínez	Spain	14:45
58	Amaia Piedra	Spain	14:47
59	Sabrina Varrone	Italy	14:48
60	Amanda Wright-Allen	United Kingdom	14:48
61	Leonora Joy	New Zealand	14:49
62	Maria McCambridge	Ireland	14:49
63	Mary Jayne Harrelson	United States	14:50
64	Valerie Vaughan	Ireland	14:50
65	Ouafa Frekech	Morocco	14:50
66	Sarah Hann	United States	14:52
67	Sonia Boubaker	Tunisia	14:53
68	Maiko Yamaguchi	Japan	14:54
69	Sara Valderas	Spain	14:55
70	Margaret Butler	Canada	14:57
71	Christina Carruzzo	Switzerland	14:58
72	Luminita Gogîrlea	Romania	14:59
73	Heather Lee	Canada	15:00
74	Anna Ndege	Tanzania	15:00
75	Sonia Thomas	United Kingdom	15:01
76	Habiba Ghribi	Tunisia	15:01
77	Cristina Casandra	Romania	15:04
78	Emma Ward	United Kingdom	15:04
79	Dalila Tahi	Algeria	15:05
80	Jane Potter	United Kingdom	15:10
81	Tatyana Chulakh	Russia	15:10
82	Valentina Belotti	Italy	15:11
83	Soulef Bouguerra	Tunisia	15:12
84	Fouzia Zoutat	Algeria	15:14
85	Tamara Salomon	Canada	15:15
86	Federica Dal Ri	Italy	15:18
87	Cristiana Artuso	Italy	15:20
88	Mieke Geens	Belgium	15:21
89	Tracy Robertson	Canada	15:22
90	Souad Aït Salem	Algeria	15:23
91	Vanessa Veiga	Spain	15:29
92	Maureen Harrington	Ireland	15:30
93	Suzanne Wiertsema	Netherlands	15:33
94	Amel Tlili	Tunisia	15:36
95	Madalena Carriço	Portugal	15:37
96	Fiona Crombie	New Zealand	15:38
97	Hakima Takeznount	Algeria	15:41
98	Helen van Lysebetten	Belgium	15:45
99	Mebarka Zellit	Algeria	15:55
100	Yuliya Arfipova	Uzbekistan	15:56
101	Irina Matrosova	Uzbekistan	16:00
102	Amira Benamor	Tunisia	16:10
103	Eva Iglesias	Andorra	16:21
104	Zamira Amirova	Uzbekistan	16:42
105	Priscilla Mamba	Eswatini	16:46
106	Yekaterina Dirova	Uzbekistan	17:21
107	Simone Zapha	Seychelles	18:11
—	Sharon Soussi	Gibraltar	DNS
—	Patrizia Tisi	Italy	DNS
—	Caroline Kwambai	Kenya	DNS
—	Christiana Augustine	Nigeria	DNS
—	Hannah Lawrence	New Zealand	DNS
—	Kim Smith	New Zealand	DNS
—	Kadie Koroma	Sierra Leone	DNS

==== Teams ====
Rank	Team	Points
1st place, gold medalist(s)	Ethiopia: Worknesh Kidane / 2; Abebech Nigussie / 6; Amane Godana / 8; Genet Gebregiorgis / 16; (Merima Hashim) / (n/s); (Sinkinesh Gudeta) / (n/s)	32
2nd place, silver medalist(s)	Kenya: Edith Masai / 1; Isabella Ochichi / 3; Nancy Wambui / 13; Jane Kiptoo / 17; (Prisca Ngetich) / (n/s)	34
3rd place, bronze medalist(s)	Ireland: Sonia O'Sullivan / 7; Anne Keenan-Buckley / 10; Rosemary Ryan / 18; Maria McCambridge / 50; (Valerie Vaughan) / (n/s); (Maureen Harrington) / (n/s)	85
4	Russia: Olga Romanova / 14; Liliya Volkova / 22; Anastasiya Zubova / 23; Albina Ivanova / 27; (Tatyana Chulakh) / (n/s)	86
5	Australia: Benita Johnson / 4; Anna Thompson / 15; Hayley McGregor / 29; Natalie Harvey / 38	86
6	United States: Suzy Favor Hamilton / 5; Carrie Tollefson / 11; Sarah Toland / 31; Janet Trujillo / 43; (Mary Jayne Harrelson) / (n/s); (Sarah Hann) / (n/s)	90
7	Portugal: Helena Sampaio / 19; Carla Sacramento / 24; Olga Machado / 30; Adélia Elias / 35; (Clarisse Cruz) / (n/s); (Madalena Carriço) / (n/s)	108
8	Morocco: Bouchra Chaâbi / 12; Meryem Karouani / 25; Seloua Ouaziz / 45; Ouafa Frekech / 51	133
9	Romania: Denisa Costescu / 28; Elena Fidatof / 37; Daniela Petrescu / 39; Luminita Gogîrlea / 54; (Cristina Casandra) / (n/s)	158
10	Tanzania: Hawa Hamis Hussein / 20; Zubeda Gussi / 40; Farida Gusi / 42; Anna Ndege / 56	158
11	United Kingdom: Helen Pattinson / 21; Lucy Elliott / 33; Amanda Wright-Allen / 49; Sonia Thomas / 57; (Emma Ward) / (n/s); (Jane Potter) / (n/s)	160
12	Spain: Jacqueline Martín / 34; Judit Plá / 36; Rocío Martínez / 46; Amaia Piedra / 47; (Sara Valderas) / (n/s); (Vanessa Veiga) / (n/s)	163
13	Italy: Rosanna Martin / 9; Sabrina Varrone / 48; Valentina Belotti / 60; Federica Dal Ri / 63; (Cristiana Artuso) / (n/s)	180
14	Canada: Émilie Mondor / 41; Carmen Douma / 44; Margaret Butler / 53; Heather Lee / 55; (Tamara Salomon) / (n/s); (Tracy Robertson) / (n/s)	193
15	Tunisia: Hana Chaouach / 26; Sonia Boubaker / 52; Habiba Ghribi / 58; Soulef Bouguerra / 61; (Amel Tlili) / (n/s); (Amira Benamor) / (n/s)	197
16	Algeria: Nasria Azaïdj / 32; Dalila Tahi / 59; Fouzia Zoutat / 62; Souad Aït Salem / 64; (Hakima Takeznount) / (n/s); (Mebarka Zellit) / (n/s)	217
17	Uzbekistan: Yuliya Arfipova / 65; Irina Matrosova / 66; Zamira Amirova / 67; Yekaterina Dirova / 68	266

- Note: Athletes in parentheses did not score for the team result (n/s: nonscorer)

== Participation ==
According to an unofficial count, 107 athletes from 29 countries participated in the Women's short race. The announced athletes from Gibraltar, Nigeria, and Sierra Leone did not show.

- Algeria (6)
- Andorra (1)
- Australia (4)
- Austria (1)
- Belgium (3)
- Burundi (1)
- Canada (6)
- Ethiopia (6)
- Ireland (6)
- Italy (5)
- Japan (3)
- Kenya (5)
- Kyrgyzstan (1)
- Morocco (4)
- Netherlands (1)
- New Zealand (2)
- Portugal (6)
- Romania (5)
- Russia (5)
- Seychelles (1)
- South Africa (1)
- Spain (6)
- Eswatini (1)
- Switzerland (1)
- Tanzania (4)
- Tunisia (6)
- United Kingdom (6)
- United States (6)
- Uzbekistan (4)

== See also ==
- 2002 IAAF World Cross Country Championships – Senior men's race
- 2002 IAAF World Cross Country Championships – Men's short race
- 2002 IAAF World Cross Country Championships – Junior men's race
- 2002 IAAF World Cross Country Championships – Senior women's race
- 2002 IAAF World Cross Country Championships – Junior women's race
