= 2002 IAAF World Cross Country Championships – Men's short race =

Men's short race at the 2002 IAAF World Cross Country Championships
- Organisers: IAAF
- Edition: 30th
- Date: March 23
- Host city: Dublin, Leinster, Ireland (Republic of Ireland)
- Venue: Leopardstown Racecourse
- Events: 1
- Distances: 4.208 km – Men's short
- Participation: 124 athletes from 38 nations

The Men's short race at the 2002 IAAF World Cross Country Championships was held at the Leopardstown Racecourse near Dublin, Ireland, on March 23, 2002. Reports of the event were given in The New York Times, in the Herald, and for the IAAF.

Complete results for individuals, for teams, medallists, and the results of British athletes who took part were published.

== Race results ==
=== Men's short race (4.208 km) ===
==== Individual ====
Rank	Athlete	Country	Time
1st place, gold medalist(s)	Kenenisa Bekele	Ethiopia	12:11
2nd place, silver medalist(s)	Luke Kipkosgei	Kenya	12:18
3rd place, bronze medalist(s)	Haylu Mekonnen	Ethiopia	12:20
4	Sammy Kipketer	Kenya	12:26
5	Craig Mottram	Australia	12:27
6	Julius Nyamu	Kenya	12:30
7	Antonio Jiménez	Spain	12:30
8	Joseph Kosgei	Kenya	12:32
9	Khalid El Amri	Morocco	12:33
10	Driss Maazouzi	France	12:34
11	Jorge Torres	United States	12:35
12	Saïd El Wardi	Morocco	12:35
13	Mohamed Awol	Ethiopia	12:38
14	Isaac Viciosa	Spain	12:39
15	Abiyote Abate	Ethiopia	12:39
16	Million Wolde	Ethiopia	12:40
17	Alberto García	Spain	12:41
18	Matthew Lane	United States	12:42
19	Luciano Di Pardo	Italy	12:42
20	Alejandro Suárez	Mexico	12:43
21	Michael Power	Australia	12:43
22	Roberto García	Spain	12:44
23	John Mayock	United Kingdom	12:44
24	Abraham Chebii	Kenya	12:45
25	Gareth Turnbull	Ireland	12:45
26	Khoudir Aggoune	Algeria	12:47
27	José Luis Blanco	Spain	12:49
28	Aziz Driouche	Morocco	12:49
29	Roland Weissteiner	Italy	12:49
30	Phil Mowbray	United Kingdom	12:50
31	Stéphane Desaulty	France	12:50
32	Fabrice Belot	France	12:50
33	Simone Zanon	Italy	12:51
34	Tarek Boukensa	Algeria	12:51
35	Graham Hood	Canada	12:52
36	Azzedine Zerdoum	Algeria	12:52
37	Mohamed Amyn	Morocco	12:53
38	Pacifique Ayabusa	Rwanda	12:53
39	Spencer Barden	United Kingdom	12:53
40	Jared Cordes	United States	12:53
41	Luis Jesús	Portugal	12:53
42	Ben Noad	United Kingdom	12:54
43	Javier Carriqueo	Argentina	12:54
44	Berhanu Addane	Ethiopia	12:54
45	Sergey Davydov	Russia	12:54
46	Joël Bourgeois	Canada	12:55
47	Sean Kaley	Canada	12:57
48	Youssef Baba	Morocco	12:57
49	Mário Teixeira	Portugal	12:57
50	Hudson de Souza	Brazil	12:58
51	Sammy Kiplagat	Kenya	12:59
52	Martin Dent	Australia	13:00
53	Daisuke Kojima	Japan	13:01
54	Ali Ezzine	Morocco	13:01
55	Mohamed Khaldi	Algeria	13:01
56	Jason Woolhouse	New Zealand	13:01
57	Miroslav Vanko	Slovakia	13:02
58	Ridouane Es-Saadi	Belgium	13:02
59	Jean Bosco Ndagijimana	Rwanda	13:02
60	Enos Matalane	South Africa	13:02
61	Aleksey Sokolov	Russia	13:03
62	Hans Janssens	Belgium	13:03
63	Robert Connolly	Ireland	13:04
64	Dave Davis	United States	13:04
65	Sergey Yemelyanov	Russia	13:04
66	Lorenzo Lazzari	Italy	13:04
67	Rachid Chékhémani	France	13:06
68	Paul Fenn	Australia	13:06
69	Salvatore Vincenti	Italy	13:07
70	Ghalem Allah Djellal	Algeria	13:08
71	Manuel Silva	Portugal	13:10
72	Rob Whalley	United Kingdom	13:10
73	Habtai Kifletsion	Eritrea	13:11
74	Slavko Petrović	Croatia	13:11
75	Aleksey Veselov	Russia	13:12
76	Paul Sumawe	Tanzania	13:12
77	Odilón Cuahutle	Mexico	13:12
78	Rachid Safari	Rwanda	13:13
79	Ben Whitby	United Kingdom	13:13
80	Denis Bagrev	Kyrgyzstan	13:14
81	Mark Thompson	Australia	13:16
82	Hamish Thorpe	New Zealand	13:17
83	Tony Cosey	United States	13:18
84	Paul Reilly	Ireland	13:19
85	Ricardo Ribas	Portugal	13:20
86	Sergey Ivanov	Russia	13:21
87	Dieudonné Disi	Rwanda	13:22
88	Stefan Beumer	Netherlands	13:24
89	Junji Konomi	Japan	13:24
90	Jeremy Deere	Canada	13:24
91	Stefan Gerber	Switzerland	13:24
92	Merzak Ouldbouchiba	Algeria	13:25
93	Paul McNamara	Ireland	13:26
94	Mark Kenneally	Ireland	13:26
95	Omar Chavarría	Mexico	13:26
96	Boštjan Buč	Slovenia	13:27
97	Jonathon Riley	United States	13:28
98	Fortunato Yaccob	Eritrea	13:28
99	Angelo Iannelli	Italy	13:31
100	Iván Hierro	Spain	13:31
101	Oscar Cortínez	Argentina	13:37
102	Simon Vroemen	Netherlands	13:39
103	Peter Cardle	Canada	13:41
104	Rubin McRae	New Zealand	13:45
105	Matthew Holder	New Zealand	13:48
106	Tim Clerbout	Belgium	13:52
107	Gareth Coughlan	Ireland	13:55
108	Maxim Malenkih	Kyrgyzstan	13:57
109	Yury Baltsevich	Belarus	13:58
110	Rembo Tesfay	Eritrea	14:03
111	Radik Khubbiev	Uzbekistan	14:08
112	Josep Sansa	Andorra	14:10
113	Ronny Marie	Seychelles	14:11
114	Sergey Zabavskiy	Tajikistan	14:14
115	Koji Yamamoto	Japan	14:16
116	Víctor Martínez	Andorra	14:37
117	Abduvahob Nizamov	Uzbekistan	14:52
118	Michael Sanchez	Gibraltar	15:06
119	Richard Muscat	Gibraltar	15:45
120	Vasiliy Medvedev	Uzbekistan	15:46
121	Khasan Rakhimov	Uzbekistan	15:49
122	Vladimir Escajadillo	Peru	16:18
123	Lee Taylor	Gibraltar	16:29
—	Zeljko Celikovic	FR Yugoslavia	DNF
—	Frederic Collignon	Belgium	DNS
—	Vital Gahungu	Burundi	DNS
—	Egide Manirazika	Burundi	DNS
—	Jean-Berchmans Ndayisenga	Burundi	DNS
—	Eric Sindayigaya	Burundi	DNS
—	Umaru Mohammed	Nigeria	DNS
—	Mohammed Yagoub	Sudan	DNS
—	Hussein Abdallah	Tanzania	DNS
—	Julius Gidabuday	Tanzania	DNS
—	Paul Wakou	Uganda	DNS

==== Teams ====
Rank	Team	Points
1st place, gold medalist(s)	Kenya: Luke Kipkosgei / 2; Sammy Kipketer / 4; Julius Nyamu / 6; Joseph Kosgei / 8; (Abraham Chebii) / (n/s); (Sammy Kiplagat) / (n/s)	20
2nd place, silver medalist(s)	Ethiopia: Kenenisa Bekele / 1; Haylu Mekonnen / 3; Mohamed Awol / 13; Abiyote Abate / 15; (Million Wolde) / (n/s); (Berhanu Addane) / (n/s)	32
3rd place, bronze medalist(s)	Spain: Antonio Jiménez / 7; Isaac Viciosa / 14; Alberto García / 16; Roberto García / 20; (José Luis Blanco) / (n/s); (Iván Hierro) / (n/s)	57
4	Morocco: Khalid El Amri / 9; Saïd El Wardi / 12; Aziz Driouche / 24; Mohamed Amyn / 33; (Youssef Baba) / (n/s); (Ali Ezzine) / (n/s)	78
5	United States: Jorge Torres / 11; Matthew Lane / 17; Jared Cordes / 36; Dave Davis / 49; (Tony Cosey) / (n/s); (Jonathon Riley) / (n/s)	113
6	France: Driss Maazouzi / 10; Stéphane Desaulty / 27; Fabrice Belot / 28; Rachid Chékhémani / 52	117
7	United Kingdom: John Mayock / 21; Phil Mowbray / 26; Spencer Barden / 35; Ben Noad / 38; (Rob Whalley) / (n/s); (Ben Whitby) / (n/s)	120
8	Australia: Craig Mottram / 5; Michael Power / 19; Martin Dent / 43; Paul Fenn / 53; (Mark Thompson) / (n/s)	120
9	Italy: Luciano Di Pardo / 18; Roland Weissteiner / 25; Simone Zanon / 29; Lorenzo Lazzari / 51; (Salvatore Vincenti) / (n/s); (Angelo Iannelli) / (n/s)	123
10	Algeria: Khoudir Aggoune / 23; Tarek Boukensa / 30; Azzedine Zerdoum / 32; Mohamed Khaldi / 44; (Ghalem Allah Djellal) / (n/s); (Merzak Ouldbouchiba) / (n/s)	129
11	Canada: Graham Hood / 31; Joël Bourgeois / 40; Sean Kaley / 41; Jeremy Deere / 61; (Peter Cardle) / (n/s)	173
12	Ireland: Gareth Turnbull / 22; Robert Connolly / 48; Paul Reilly / 58; Paul McNamara / 62; (Mark Kenneally) / (n/s); (Gareth Coughlan) / (n/s)	190
13	Russia: Sergey Davydov / 39; Aleksey Sokolov / 47; Sergey Yemelyanov / 50; Aleksey Veselov / 55; (Sergey Ivanov) / (n/s)	191
14	Portugal: Luis Jesús / 37; Mário Teixeira / 42; Manuel Silva / 54; Ricardo Ribas / 59	192
15	Rwanda: Pacifique Ayabusa / 34; Jean Bosco Ndagijimana / 46; Rachid Safari / 56; Dieudonné Disi / 60	196
16	New Zealand: Jason Woolhouse / 45; Hamish Thorpe / 57; Rubin McRae / 63; Matthew Holder / 64	229
17	Uzbekistan: Radik Khubbiev / 65; Abduvahob Nizamov / 66; Vasiliy Medvedev / 67; Khasan Rakhimov / 68	266

- Note: Athletes in parentheses did not score for the team result (n/s: nonscorer)

== Participation ==
According to an unofficial count, 124 athletes from 38 countries participated in the Men's short race. The announced athletes from Burundi, Nigeria, Sudan, and Uganda did not show.

- Algeria (6)
- Andorra (2)
- Argentina (2)
- Australia (5)
- Belarus (1)
- Belgium (3)
- Brazil (1)
- Canada (5)
- Croatia (1)
- Eritrea (3)
- Ethiopia (6)
- France (4)
- Gibraltar (3)
- Ireland (6)
- Italy (6)
- Japan (3)
- Kenya (6)
- Kyrgyzstan (2)
- Mexico (3)
- Morocco (6)
- Netherlands (2)
- New Zealand (4)
- Peru (1)
- Portugal (4)
- Russia (5)
- Rwanda (4)
- Seychelles (1)
- Slovakia (1)
- Slovenia (1)
- South Africa (1)
- Spain (6)
- Switzerland (1)
- Tajikistan (1)
- Tanzania (1)
- United Kingdom (6)
- United States (6)
- Uzbekistan (4)
- FR Yugoslavia (1)

== See also ==
- 2002 IAAF World Cross Country Championships – Senior men's race
- 2002 IAAF World Cross Country Championships – Junior men's race
- 2002 IAAF World Cross Country Championships – Senior women's race
- 2002 IAAF World Cross Country Championships – Women's short race
- 2002 IAAF World Cross Country Championships – Junior women's race
