= 2004 IAAF World Athletics Final – Results =

These are the results of the 2004 IAAF World Athletics Final, which took place in at the Stade Louis II in Monte Carlo, Monaco on 18–19 September. The hammer throw events were staged separately on 5 September in Szombathely, Hungary, due to stadium limitations in Monaco.

The year's top seven athletes, based on their points ranking of the 2004 IAAF World Athletics Tour, qualified to compete in each event, with an extra four athletes selected for races of 1500 metres and above. One additional athlete, a wildcard, was allocated to each event by the IAAF and replacement athletes were admitted to replace the qualified athletes that could not attend the final.

== Track ==
Key

Wild card athlete

Events
100 m	200 m	400 m	800 m	1500 m	3000 m	5000 m	110/100 m h	400 m h	3000 m st

=== 100 metres ===
Men's
Rank	Athlete	Nation	Time (sec)	Reaction time	Notes
1	Asafa Powell	Jamaica (JAM)	9.98	0.131	CR
2	Francis Obikwelu	Portugal (POR)	10.10	0.150	
3	Aziz Zakari	Ghana (GHA)	10.15	0.139	
4	John Capel	United States (USA)	10.25	0.149	
5	Kim Collins	Saint Kitts and Nevis (SKN)	10.26	0.139	
6	Leonard Scott	United States (USA)	10.31	0.252	
7	Joshua J. Johnson	United States (USA)	10.44	0.160	
8	Marcus Brunson	United States (USA)	10.55	0.156	

Women's
Rank	Athlete	Nation	Time (sec)	Reaction time	Notes
1	Veronica Campbell Brown	Jamaica (JAM)	10.91	0.121	PB
2	Aleen Bailey	Jamaica (JAM)	11.16	0.160	
3	Lauryn Williams	United States (USA)	11.21	0.135	
4	Christine Arron	France (FRA)	11.23	0.163	
4	Sherone Simpson	Jamaica (JAM)	11.23	0.148	
6	Debbie Ferguson-McKenzie	Bahamas (BAH)	11.24	0.148	
7	Ivet Lalova	Bulgaria (BUL)	11.28	0.131	
—	Chryste Gaines	United States (USA)	11.83	0.153	DQ

=== 200 metres ===
Men's
Rank	Athlete	Nation	Time (sec)	Reaction time	Notes
1	Asafa Powell	Jamaica (JAM)	20.06	0.143	CR
2	Frank Fredericks	Namibia (NAM)	20.31	0.125	
3	Stéphane Buckland	Mauritius (MRI)	20.41	0.151	
4	Francis Obikwelu	Portugal (POR)	20.58	0.146	
5	Joshua J. Johnson	United States (USA)	20.65	0.146	
6	Dominic Demeritte	Bahamas (BAH)	20.81	0.132	
7	Joseph Batangdon	Cameroon (CMR)	20.95	0.152	
8	Tobias Unger	Germany (GER)	20.95	0.120	

Women's
Rank	Athlete	Nation	Time (sec)	Reaction time	Notes
1	Veronica Campbell Brown	Jamaica (JAM)	22.64	0.173	
2	Debbie Ferguson-McKenzie	Bahamas (BAH)	22.66	0.141	
3	Aleen Bailey	Jamaica (JAM)	22.84	0.185	
4	Abiodun Oyepitan	Great Britain (GBR)	23.09	0.157	
5	Kim Gevaert	Belgium (BEL)	23.10	0.141	
6	Cydonie Mothersille	Cayman Islands (CAY)	23.24	0.232	
7	Ivet Lalova	Bulgaria (BUL)	23.37	0.140	
8	Maryna Maydanova	Ukraine (UKR)	23.68	0.179	

=== 400 metres ===
Men's
Rank	Athlete	Nation	Time (sec)	Reaction time	Notes
1	Michael Blackwood	Jamaica (JAM)	44.95	0.223	CR
2	Derrick Brew	United States (USA)	44.97	0.167	
3	Otis Harris	United States (USA)	45.06	0.180	
4	Leslie Djhone	France (FRA)	45.26	0.167	
5	Alleyne Francique	Grenada (GRN)	45.27	0.181	
6	Jerry Harris	United States (USA)	45.38	0.158	
7	Davian Clarke	Jamaica (JAM)	45.75	0.175	
8	Eric Milazar	Mauritius (MRI)	46.66	0.171	

Women's
Rank	Athlete	Nation	Time (sec)	Reaction time	Notes
1	Ana Guevara	Mexico (MEX)	50.13	0.155	
2	Monique Hennagan	United States (USA)	50.20	0.152	
3	DeeDee Trotter	United States (USA)	50.60	0.178	
4	Christine Amertil	Bahamas (BAH)	50.78	0.196	
5	Natalya Antyukh	Russia (RUS)	50.95	0.163	
6	Tonique Williams-Darling	Bahamas (BAH)	51.44	0.157	
7	Natalya Nazarova	Russia (RUS)	52.35	0.141	
—	Ionela Târlea	Romania (ROU)	—	—	DNS

=== 800 metres ===
Men's
Rank	Athlete	Nation	Time (min)	Notes
1	Yusuf Saad Kamel	Bahrain (BHR)	1:45.91	CR
2	Joseph Mwengi Mutua	Kenya (KEN)	1:46.13	
3	Bram Som	Netherlands (NED)	1:46.33	
4	Wilson Kipketer	Denmark (DEN)	1:46.37	
5	Mbulaeni Mulaudzi	South Africa (RSA)	1:46.45	
6	Wilfred Bungei	Kenya (KEN)	1:46.45	
7	Amine Laalou	Morocco (MAR)	1:46.74	
—	William Yiampoy	Kenya (KEN)	—	DNS

Women's
Rank	Athlete	Nation	Time (min)	Notes
1	Hasna Benhassi	Morocco (MAR)	2:01.42	
2	Jearl Miles Clark	United States (USA)	2:01.73	
3	Mina Aït Hammou	Morocco (MAR)	2:01.78	
4	Svetlana Cherkasova	Russia (RUS)	2:02.47	
5	Élisabeth Grousselle	France (FRA)	2:02.99	
6	Joanne Fenn	Great Britain (GBR)	2:03.48	
7	Tatyana Andrianova	Russia (RUS)	2:03.70	
8	Maria Cioncan	Romania (ROU)	2:04.55	

=== 1500 metres ===
Men's
Rank	Athlete	Nation	Time (min)	Notes
1	Ivan Heshko	Ukraine (UKR)	3:44.92	
2	Alex Kipchirchir Rono	Kenya (KEN)	3:44.95	
3	Laban Rotich	Kenya (KEN)	3:45.38	
4	Bernard Lagat	Kenya (KEN)	3:45.41	
5	Paul Korir	Kenya (KEN)	3:45.68	
6	Kamel Boulahfane	Algeria (ALG)	3:45.78	
7	Michael East	Great Britain (GBR)	3:45.93	
8	Rui Silva	Portugal (POR)	3:46.05	
9	Timothy Too Kiptanui	Kenya (KEN)	3:46.14	
10	Gert-Jan Liefers	Netherlands (NED)	3:46.50	
11	Isaac Kiprono Songok	Kenya (KEN)	3:48.32	
12	Adil Kaouch	Morocco (MAR)	3:48.90	

Women's
Rank	Athlete	Nation	Time (min)	Notes
1	Kelly Holmes	Great Britain (GBR)	4:04.55	
2	Tatyana Tomashova	Russia (RUS)	4:05.18	
3	Yelena Zadorozhnaya	Russia (RUS)	4:05.71	
4	Natalia Rodríguez	Spain (ESP)	4:05.72	
5	Carmen Douma-Hussar	Canada (CAN)	4:05.94	
6	Olga Yegorova	Russia (RUS)	4:06.31	
7	Lidia Chojecka	Poland (POL)	4:06.62	
8	Natalya Yevdokimova	Russia (RUS)	4:07.80	
9	Wioletta Frankiewicz	Poland (POL)	4:07.93	
10	Maria Cioncan	Romania (ROU)	4:08.09	
11	Hayley Tullett	Great Britain (GBR)	4:08.70	
12	Judit Varga	Hungary (HUN)	4:12.19	

=== 3000 metres ===
Men's
Rank	Athlete	Nation	Time (min)	Notes
1	Eliud Kipchoge	Kenya (KEN)	7:38.67	
2	James Kwalia C'Kurui	Kenya (KEN)	7:39.40	
3	Mulugeta Wendimu	Ethiopia (ETH)	7:39.60	PB
4	Leonard Mucheru Maina	Bahrain (BHR)	7:40.13	
5	Boniface Kiprotich Songok	Kenya (KEN)	7:40.66	
6	Markos Geneti	Ethiopia (ETH)	7:42.24	PB
7	Hicham Bellani	Morocco (MAR)	7:43.38	
8	Joseph Kosgei	Kenya (KEN)	7:48.46	
9	Abraham Chebii	Kenya (KEN)	7:54.86	
10	Luke Kipkosgei	Kenya (KEN)	7:55.63	
11	Mohammed Amyn	Morocco (MAR)	7:58.07	
12	Günther Weidlinger	Austria (AUT)	8:05.82	

Women's
Rank	Athlete	Nation	Time (min)	Notes
1	Meseret Defar	Ethiopia (ETH)	8:36.46	CR
2	Yelena Zadorozhnaya	Russia (RUS)	8:37.65	SB
3	Lidia Chojecka	Poland (POL)	8:39.16	SB
4	Joanne Pavey	Great Britain (GBR)	8:40.22	SB
5	Sentayehu Ejigu	Ethiopia (ETH)	8:42.63	PB
6	Irina Mikitenko	Germany (GER)	8:43.17	SB
7	Alice Jemeli Timbilili	Kenya (KEN)	8:50.46	
8	Hind Déhiba Chahyd	France (FRA)	8:53.86	PB
9	Nataliya Tobias	Ukraine (UKR)	8:54.32	SB
10	Sally Barsosio	Kenya (KEN)	8:56.49	
11	Margaret Maury	France (FRA)	8:57.82	PB
—	Elvan Abeylegesse	Turkey (TUR)	—	DNS

=== 5000 metres ===
Men's
Rank	Athlete	Nation	Time (min)	Notes
1	Sileshi Sihine	Ethiopia (ETH)	13:06.95	CR
2	Dejene Berhanu	Ethiopia (ETH)	13:07.91	
3	Augustine Kiprono Choge	Kenya (KEN)	13:09.00	
4	Gebregziabher Gebremariam	Ethiopia (ETH)	13:09.03	
5	Mark Bett Kipkinyor	Kenya (KEN)	13:10.87	
6	Ahmad Hassan Abdullah	Qatar (QAT)	13:12.60	
7	Charles Waweru Kamathi	Kenya (KEN)	13:15.02	
8	Boniface Toroitich Kiprop	Uganda (UGA)	13:15.48	
9	Abderrahim Goumri	Morocco (MAR)	13:16.05	
10	Tariku Bekele	Ethiopia (ETH)	13:18.98	
11	Ismaïl Sghyr	France (FRA)	13:30.02	
12	Khoudir Aggoune	Algeria (ALG)	13:30.53	

Women's
Rank	Athlete	Nation	Time (min)	Notes
1	Elvan Abeylegesse	Turkey (TUR)	14:59.19	
2	Isabella Ochichi	Kenya (KEN)	14:59.48	
3	Ejegayehu Dibaba	Ethiopia (ETH)	14:59.52	
4	Edith Masai	Kenya (KEN)	14:59.95	
5	Werknesh Kidane	Ethiopia (ETH)	15:01.27	
6	Alice Jemeli Timbilili	Kenya (KEN)	15:28.18	
7	Iness Chepkesis Chenonge	Kenya (KEN)	15:28.18	
8	Kathy Butler	Great Britain (GBR)	15:46.72	
9	Irene Kwambai Kipchumba	Kenya (KEN)	15:59.83	
10	Maryna Dubrova	Ukraine (UKR)	16:46.92	
—	Tirunesh Dibaba	Ethiopia (ETH)	—	DNS

=== 110/100 metres hurdles ===
Men's
Rank	Athlete	Nation	Time (sec)	Reaction time	Notes
1	Allen Johnson	United States (USA)	13.16	0.144	
2	Maurice Wignall	Jamaica (JAM)	13.19	0.118	
3	Stanislavs Olijars	Latvia (LAT)	13.40	0.154	
4	Ron Bramlett	United States (USA)	13.51	0.149	
5	Charles Allen	Canada (CAN)	13.58	0.125	
6	Robert Kronberg	Sweden (SWE)	13.59	0.126	
7	Mateus Facho Inocêncio	Brazil (BRA)	13.65	0.131	
—	Duane Ross	United States (USA)	13.84	0.129	DQ

Women's
Rank	Athlete	Nation	Time (sec)	Reaction time	Notes
1	Joanna Hayes	United States (USA)	12.58	0.152	
2	Jenny Adams	United States (USA)	12.68	0.140	
3	Lacena Golding-Clarke	Jamaica (JAM)	12.69	0.133	PB
4	Glory Alozie	Spain (ESP)	12.69	0.152	
5	Olena Krasovska	Ukraine (UKR)	12.69	0.125	
6	Delloreen Ennis-London	Jamaica (JAM)	12.75	0.138	
7	Linda Ferga-Khodadin	France (FRA)	12.75	0.149	SB
8	Mariya Koroteyeva	Russia (RUS)	12.79	0.139	

=== 400 metres hurdles ===
Men's
Rank	Athlete	Nation	Time (sec)	Reaction time	Notes
1	Bershawn Jackson	United States (USA)	47.86	0.128	PB
2	James Carter	United States (USA)	48.06	0.204	
3	Kemel Thompson	Jamaica (JAM)	48.06	0.161	SB
4	Danny McFarlane	Jamaica (JAM)	48.23	0.194	
5	Bayano Kamani	Panama (PAN)	48.24	0.153	
6	Dai Tamesue	Japan (JPN)	48.72	0.169	
7	Naman Keïta	France (FRA)	48.82	0.189	
8	Chris Rawlinson	Great Britain (GBR)	51.14	0.168	

Women's
Rank	Athlete	Nation	Time (sec)	Reaction time	Notes
1	Sandra Glover	United States (USA)	54.57	0.274	
2	Tetiana Tereschuk-Antipova	Ukraine (UKR)	54.64	0.208	
3	Brenda Taylor	United States (USA)	55.00	0.165	
4	Faní Halkiá	Greece (GRE)	55.10	0.178	
5	Ionela Târlea	Romania (ROU)	55.79	0.165	
6	Natalya Torshina-Alimzhanova	Kazakhstan (KAZ)	56.12	0.154	
7	Ekaterina Bikert	Russia (RUS)	56.15	0.208	
8	Benedetta Ceccarelli	Italy (ITA)	57.23	0.194	

=== 3000 metres steeplechase ===
Men's
Rank	Athlete	Nation	Time (min)	Notes
1	Saif Saaeed Shaheen	Qatar (QAT)	7:56.94	CR
2	Ezekiel Kemboi	Kenya (KEN)	8:02.98	SB
3	Paul Kipsiele Koech	Kenya (KEN)	8:03.21	
4	Kipkirui Misoi	Kenya (KEN)	8:12.99	SB
5	Richard Kipkemboi Mateelong	Kenya (KEN)	8:14.22	
6	Brimin Kiprop Kipruto	Kenya (KEN)	8:16.45	
7	David Biwott Chemweno	Kenya (KEN)	8:17.98	
8	Julius Nyamu	Kenya (KEN)	8:26.45	
9	Ali Ezzine	Morocco (MAR)	8:32.04	
10	Luis Miguel Martín	Spain (ESP)	8:37.85	
11	Wesley Kiprotich	Kenya (KEN)	8:55.92	
12	Simon Vroemen	Netherlands (NED)	9:39.81	

== Field ==
Events
High jump	Pole vault	Long jump	Triple jump	Shot put	Discus	Hammer	Javelin

=== High jump ===
Men's
Rank	Athlete	Nation	Result (m)	Notes	2.13	2.18	2.23	2.27	2.30	2.33	2.40
1	Stefan Holm	Sweden (SWE)	2.33	CR	–	O	O	O	O	O	XXX
2	Yaroslav Rybakov	Russia (RUS)	2.30		–	O	O	XO	O	XXX	
3	Mark Boswell	Canada (CAN)	2.30	SB	–	–	O	XXO	XO	XXX	
4	Jamie Nieto	United States (USA)	2.27		–	O	O	XO	–	XXX	
5	Andriy Sokolovskyy	Ukraine (UKR)	2.27		–	XO	O	XO	XX-	X	
6	Matt Hemingway	United States (USA)	2.23		–	O	O	XXX			
7	Jaroslav Bába	Czech Republic (CZE)	2.23		–	XO	O	XXX			
8	Vyacheslav Voronin	Russia (RUS)	2.23		–	O	XXO	XXX			

Women's
Rank	Athlete	Nation	Result (m)	Notes	1.83	1.88	1.92	1.95	1.98	2.01	2.10
1	Elena Slesarenko	Russia (RUS)	2.01	CR	O	O	O	O	O	XO	XXX
2	Vita Styopina	Ukraine (UKR)	1.98		O	O	O	XXO	XO	XXX	
3	Iryna Mykhalchenko	Ukraine (UKR)	1.98		O	O	O	O	XXO	XXX	
4	Inha Babakova	Ukraine (UKR)	1.95		O	O	XO	O	XXX		
5	Hestrie Cloete	South Africa (RSA)	1.95		O	O	O	XO	XXX		
6	Amy Acuff	United States (USA)	1.95		O	O	XO	XO	XXX		
7	Anna Chicherova	Russia (RUS)	1.92		XO	O	XXO	XXX			
8	Vita Palamar	Ukraine (UKR)	1.88		XO	O	XX				

=== Pole vault ===
Men's
Rank	Athlete	Nation	Result (m)	Notes	5.45	5.60	5.70	5.78	5.86	6.01	6.06	6.16
1	Timothy Mack	United States (USA)	6.01	CR	–	O	XO	XO	O	XXO	X-	XX
2	Toby Stevenson	United States (USA)	5.70		–	O	O	XX-	X			
3	Derek Miles	United States (USA)	5.70		XO	O	XO	XXX				
4	Aleksandr Averbukh	Israel (ISR)	5.60		–	XO	–	XXX				
4	Tim Lobinger	Germany (GER)	5.60		O	XO	XXX					
6	Giuseppe Gibilisco	Italy (ITA)	5.45		O	–	XXX					
6	Jeff Hartwig	United States (USA)	5.45		O	XXX						
8	Igor Pavlov	Russia (RUS)	5.45		XO	XXX						

Women's
Rank	Athlete	Nation	Result (m)	Notes	4.35	4.50	4.60	4.70	4.78	4.83	4.93
1	Elena Isinbaeva	Russia (RUS)	4.83	CR	–	O	O	X-	X-	O	XXX
2	Tatyana Polnova	Russia (RUS)	4.78	PB	O	XO	O	O	O	XXX	
3	Anna Rogowska	Poland (POL)	4.60		O	XXO	O	XXX			
4	Svetlana Feofanova	Russia (RUS)	4.60		–	O	XO	XXX			
5	Monika Pyrek	Poland (POL)	4.50		O	O	XXX				
6	Anzhela Balakhonova	Ukraine (UKR)	4.50		XO	O	XXX				
7	Thórey Edda Elisdóttir	Iceland (ISL)	4.35		XO	XXX					
7	Vanessa Boslak	France (FRA)	4.35		XO	XXX					

=== Long jump ===
Men's
Rank	Athlete	Nation	Result (m)	Wind	Notes	1	2	3	4
1	Ignisious Gaisah	Ghana (GHA)	8.32	+0.4	CR	8.08 -0.7	8.11 -1.0	8.17 -0.5	8.32 +0.4
2	Dwight Phillips	United States (USA)	8.26	-0.3		X -0.6	8.26 -0.3	X	7.03 +0.0
3	John Moffitt	United States (USA)	8.05	-0.2		8.05 -0.2	X -1.0	X +0.0	7.88 +0.4
4	Joan Lino Martínez	Spain (ESP)	7.99	-0.6		7.84 -0.5	7.99 -0.6	4.17 -0.3	7.74 +0.1
5	James Beckford	Jamaica (JAM)	7.96	0.0		7.66 +0.0	7.96 +0.0	7.75 -1.2	7.76 -0.2
6	Christopher Tomlinson	Great Britain (GBR)	7.90	-0.3		7.90 -0.3	7.87 +0.0	7.76 -0.3	7.80 -0.3
7	Bogdan Tarus	Romania (ROU)	7.61	-1.0		7.32 +0.3	7.61 -1.0	X -1.1	X -1.5
8	Vitaliy Shkurlatov	Russia (RUS)	7.60	-1.1		7.60 -1.1	X	4.91 -0.6	7.31 NWI

Women's
Rank	Athlete	Nation	Result (m)	Wind	Notes	1	2	3	4
1	Irina Meleshina	Russia (RUS)	6.74	+0.3		6.74 +0.3	X -0.2	6.60 +0.8	X +0.0
2	Tatyana Lebedeva	Russia (RUS)	6.72	+0.7		6.68 +1.1	X -0.2	6.72 +0.7	X +0.1
3	Tatyana Kotova	Russia (RUS)	6.65	0.0		6.65 +0.0	6.62 -0.1	6.60 +0.4	6.59 +0.7
4	Anju Bobby George	India (IND)	6.61	+1.2		6.61 +1.2	6.23 -0.3	X -0.6	6.52 +0.5
5	Jade Johnson	Great Britain (GBR)	6.46	-0.6		6.46 -0.6	X +0.6	6.37 -0.3	X +0.5
6	Grace Upshaw	United States (USA)	6.43	+0.3		X +0.2	6.43 +0.3	X +0.7	6.23 +0.0
7	Valentina Gotovska	Latvia (LAT)	6.11	0.0		X +0.3	X +0.5	6.11 +0.0	X -0.3
8	Olga Rublyova	Russia (RUS)	6.00	-0.3		X +1.1	X +0.4	6.00 -0.3	X +0.5

=== Triple jump ===
Men's
Rank	Athlete	Nation	Result (m)	Wind	Notes	1	2	3	4
1	Christian Olsson	Sweden (SWE)	17.66	-0.2	CR	16.85 +0.5	16.95 +0.6	17.66 -0.2	-
2	Danil Burkenya	Russia (RUS)	17.20	+0.3		16.75 +0.6	17.00 +0.3	17.20 +0.3	16.85 +0.2
3	Kenta Bell	United States (USA)	17.16	+0.4		16.55 +0.2	X +0.1	17.16 +0.4	16.99 +0.4
4	Jadel Gregório	Brazil (BRA)	17.13	+0.3		16.27 +0.5	16.90 +0.4	16.96 +0.3	17.13 +0.3
5	Karl Taillepierre	France (FRA)	17.04	+0.4		X +0.2	16.80 +0.2	17.04 +0.4	16.66 +0.6
6	Leevan Sands	Bahamas (BAH)	16.91	0.0		X +0.6	16.84 +0.5	X +0.8	16.91 +0.0
7	Walter Davis	United States (USA)	16.83	0.0		16.05 +0.0	15.60 +0.4	16.83 +0.0	X +0.5
8	Marian Oprea	Romania (ROU)	16.36	+0.1		16.36 +0.1	–	–	–

Women's
Rank	Athlete	Nation	Result (m)	Wind	Notes	1	2	3	4
1	Françoise Mbango Etone	Cameroon (CMR)	15.01	0.0		14.40 -0.3	14.68 +0.1	14.92 -0.4	15.01 +0.0
2	Tatyana Lebedeva	Russia (RUS)	14.96	-0.3		14.74 +0.1	X +0.5	14.64 -0.1	14.96 -0.3
3	Yamilé Aldama	Sudan (SUD)	14.92	+0.2		X	14.68 -0.1	14.92 +0.2	X -0.8
4	Hrysopiyí Devetzí	Greece (GRE)	14.78	+0.2		14.78 +0.2	X +0.4	X -0.5	X -0.4
5	Magdelín Martínez	Italy (ITA)	14.63	-0.8		14.38 -0.4	14.63 -0.8	X -0.3	X +0.0
6	Anna Pyatykh	Russia (RUS)	14.57	-0.2		X -0.1	14.57 -0.2	X +0.6	14.27 -0.5
7	Trecia Smith	Jamaica (JAM)	14.53	-0.5		X -0.4	14.32 -1.0	14.53 -0.5	14.38 -0.1
8	Olena Hovorova	Ukraine (UKR)	14.12	-1.0		14.12 -1.0	14.08 -0.1	14.07 +0.0	X -0.5

=== Shot put ===
Men's
Rank	Athlete	Nation	Result (m)	Notes	1	2	3	4
1	Joachim Olsen	Denmark (DEN)	21.46	CR	20.75	21.46	21.22	21.25
2	Adam Nelson	United States (USA)	20.80		X	20.80	X	X
3	Manuel Martínez Gutiérrez	Spain (ESP)	20.67		20.67	20.67	X	20.41
4	Reese Hoffa	United States (USA)	20.51		20.21	X	19.98	20.51
5	Janus Robberts	South Africa (RSA)	20.14		19.53	19.74	20.14	19.84
6	Carl Myerscough	Great Britain (GBR)	20.05		19.28	20.05	19.41	X
7	Andrei Mikhnevich	Belarus (BLR)	19.47		19.47	19.27	19.37	19.36
—	Yuriy Bilonoh	Ukraine (UKR)	19.47	DQ	19.30	19.47	19.28	19.13

Women's
Rank	Athlete	Nation	Result (m)	Notes	1	2	3	4
1	Nadzeya Ostapchuk	Belarus (BLR)	19.23		X	18.84	19.23	X
2	Krystyna Zabawska	Poland (POL)	18.27		18.16	18.27	18.02	18.13
3	Lieja Tunks	Netherlands (NED)	18.11		18.11	X	17.19	X
4	Nadine Kleinert	Germany (GER)	17.97		17.54	17.61	17.12	17.97
5	Natallia Mikhnevich	Belarus (BLR)	17.56		X	17.05	17.56	17.36
6	Assunta Legnante	Italy (ITA)	17.20		17.20	16.49	16.39	16.82
7	Cleopatra Borel	Trinidad and Tobago (TTO)	16.24		16.24	15.62	15.80	X
—	Svetlana Krivelyova	Russia (RUS)	17.55	DQ	17.55	17.55	17.18	17.44

=== Discus throw ===
Men's
Rank	Athlete	Nation	Result (m)	Notes	1	2	3	4
1	Mario Pestano	Spain (ESP)	64.11		64.11	X	X	X
2	Zoltán Kövágó	Hungary (HUN)	64.09		60.30	64.09	62.52	61.65
3	Aleksander Tammert	Estonia (EST)	63.69		63.61	X	62.39	63.69
4	Virgilijus Alekna	Lithuania (LTU)	63.64		60.59	X	63.64	62.95
5	Gerd Kanter	Estonia (EST)	63.28		60.45	60.04	X	63.28
6	Vasili Kaptyukh	Belarus (BLR)	63.03		59.36	61.09	63.03	62.35
7	Casey Malone	United States (USA)	62.88		62.73	62.88	62.07	58.39
8	Frantz Kruger	South Africa (RSA)	59.65		X	59.65	X	59.50

Women's
Rank	Athlete	Nation	Result (m)	Notes	1	2	3	4
1	Vera Pospíšilová-Cechlová	Czech Republic (CZE)	65.86	CR	62.73	65.86	64.23	X
2	Natalya Sadova	Russia (RUS)	65.57		62.93	65.57	65.10	62.78
3	Aretha Thurmond	United States (USA)	63.43		62.85	X	63.43	63.05
4	Olena Antonova	Ukraine (UKR)	62.71		62.11	59.96	57.85	62.71
5	Beatrice Faumuina	New Zealand (NZL)	61.85		59.44	61.45	61.74	61.85
6	Franka Dietzsch	Germany (GER)	61.48		61.48	X	X	60.03
7	Ekateríni Vóggoli	Greece (GRE)	59.14		56.87	57.04	59.14	X
—	Iryna Yatchenko	Belarus (BLR)	64.20	DQ	63.54	62.61	63.30	64.20

=== Hammer throw ===
Men's
Rank	Athlete	Nation	Result (m)	Notes	1	2	3	4	5	6
1	Olli-Pekka Karjalainen	Finland (FIN)	81.43		X	78.44	80.59	81.43	X	79.06
2	Krisztián Pars	Hungary (HUN)	79.17		X	75.68	X	78.03	79.17	76.30
3	Primož Kozmus	Slovenia (SLO)	77.21		74.66	77.02	X	76.77	77.21	X
4	Libor Charfreitag	Slovakia (SVK)	76.99		X	76.38	76.01	76.35	76.99	X
5	Vadim Devyatovskiy	Belarus (BLR)	76.54		X	76.12	X	76.41	76.54	X
6	Karsten Kobs	Germany (GER)	75.26		75.03	72.96	75.26	X	X	X
7	Ilya Konovalov	Russia (RUS)	74.77		74.36	73.01	74.77	73.04	73.42	73.76
—	Ivan Tsikhan	Belarus (BLR)	80.44	DQ	X	79.63	80.44	X	79.68	78.00

Women's
Rank	Athlete	Nation	Result (m)	Notes	1	2	3	4	5	6
1	Olga Kuzenkova	Russia (RUS)	72.90		72.86	71.15	X	72.90	69.36	71.50
2	Volha Tsandzer	Belarus (BLR)	72.06		69.51	72.06	X	69.81	71.15	70.81
3	Manuela Montebrun	France (FRA)	70.63		67.20	67.69	67.90	70.33	70.63	68.88
4	Katalin Divós	Hungary (HUN)	69.94	SB	67.40	68.48	X	69.94	69.17	X
5	Kamila Skolimowska	Poland (POL)	69.83		63.63	62.17	68.17	69.55	69.83	X
6	Betty Heidler	Germany (GER)	69.65		X	66.75	67.53	69.65	68.19	68.45
7	Iryna Sekachova	Ukraine (UKR)	69.43		X	64.20	69.43	68.10	X	67.97
8	Erin Gilreath	United States (USA)	69.21		66.22	65.14	68.74	69.21	69.14	65.45
9	Anna Mahon	United States (USA)	65.79		65.79	X	65.27	63.10	X	X

=== Javelin throw ===
Men's
Rank	Athlete	Nation	Result (m)	Notes	1	2	3	4
1	Breaux Greer	United States (USA)	87.68	CR	83.89	87.68	X	X
2	Andreas Thorkildsen	Norway (NOR)	82.52		75.48	80.73	82.52	79.39
3	Jan Zelezný	Czech Republic (CZE)	82.01	SB	X	82.01	X	X
4	Sergey Makarov	Russia (RUS)	80.34		80.34	76.63	77.89	78.86
5	Tero Pitkämäki	Finland (FIN)	78.50		78.50	78.24	77.88	X
6	Aleksandr Ivanov	Russia (RUS)	77.25		73.86	75.30	X	77.25
7	Andrus Värnik	Estonia (EST)	76.65		76.65	X	X	X
8	Vadims Vasilevskis	Latvia (LAT)	76.28		76.28	X	X	X
9	Eriks Rags	Latvia (LAT)	72.67		72.11	X	71.85	72.67

Women's
Rank	Athlete	Nation	Result (m)	Notes	1	2	3	4
1	Olisdeilys Menéndez	Cuba (CUB)	66.20	CR	62.09	66.20	66.03	63.22
2	Nikola Brejchová	Czech Republic (CZE)	64.58		60.94	64.58	59.78	61.36
3	Steffi Nerius	Germany (GER)	61.16		60.36	58.69	61.16	59.90
4	Taina Kolkkala	Finland (FIN)	60.00		60.00	X	58.64	59.16
5	Lavern Eve	Bahamas (BAH)	59.85		59.23	59.85	X	59.40
6	Felicia Tilea-Moldovan	Romania (ROU)	59.59		59.59	X	X	55.03
7	Valeriya Zabruskova	Russia (RUS)	58.63		56.85	56.75	58.63	X
8	Nikolett Szabó	Hungary (HUN)	58.29		58.29	57.01	56.53	X
