= 2002 IAAF World Cross Country Championships =

Coordinates: 53°15′58″N 6°11′37″W

- Organisers: IAAF
- Edition: 30th
- Date: March 23/24
- Host city: Dublin, Leinster, Ireland (Republic of Ireland)
- Venue: Leopardstown Racecourse
- Events: 6
- Distances: 11.998 km – Senior men 4.208 km – Men's short 7.974 km – Junior men 7.974 km – Senior women 4.208 km – Women's short 5.962 km – Junior women
- Participation: 664 athletes from 59 nations

The 2002 IAAF World Cross Country Championships took place on March 23/24, 2002. The races were held at the Leopardstown Racecourse, Dún Laoghaire–Rathdown, near Dublin, Ireland. Reports of the event were given in The New York Times, in the Herald, and for the IAAF.

New scores for team results were introduced.

Complete results for senior men, for senior men's teams, for men's short race, for men's short race teams, for junior men, for junior men's teams, senior women, for senior women's teams, for women's short race, for women's short race teams, for junior women, for junior women's teams, medallists, and the results of British athletes who took part were published.

== Medallists ==
| Event | Gold | | Silver | | Bronze | |
|---|---|---|---|---|---|---|
Individual
| Senior men (11.998 km) | Kenenisa Bekele; Ethiopia | 34:52 | John Yuda; Tanzania | 34:58 | Wilberforce Talel; Kenya | 35:20 |
| Men's short (4.208 km) | Kenenisa Bekele; Ethiopia | 12:11 | Luke Kipkosgei; Kenya | 12:18 | Haylu Mekonnen; Ethiopia | 12:20 |
| Junior men (7.974 km) | Gebre-egziabher Gebremariam; Ethiopia | 23:18 | Abel Cheruiyot; Kenya | 23:19 | Boniface Kiprop; Uganda | 23:28 |
| Senior women (7.974 km) | Paula Radcliffe; United Kingdom | 26:55 | Deena Drossin; United States | 27:04 | Colleen de Reuck; United States | 27:17 |
| Women's short (4.208 km) | Edith Masai; Kenya | 13:30 | Worknesh Kidane; Ethiopia | 13:36 | Isabella Ochichi; Kenya | 13:39 |
| Junior women (5.962 km) | Viola Kibiwott; Kenya | 20:13 | Tirunesh Dibaba; Ethiopia | 20:14 | Vivian Cheruiyot; Kenya | 20:22 |
Team
| Senior men | Kenya | 18 | Ethiopia | 43 | Morocco | 58 |
| Men's short | Kenya | 20 | Ethiopia | 32 | Spain | 57 |
| Junior men | Kenya | 18 | Ethiopia | 24 | Uganda | 37 |
| Senior women | Ethiopia | 28 | United States | 38 | Kenya | 41 |
| Women's short | Ethiopia | 32 | Kenya | 34 | Ireland | 85 |
| Junior women | Kenya | 13 | Ethiopia | 24 | Japan | 63 |

== Race results ==
=== Senior men's race (11.998 km) ===
Individual race
| Rank | Athlete | Country | Time |
|---|---|---|---|
| 1st place, gold medalist(s) | Kenenisa Bekele | Ethiopia | 34:52 |
| 2nd place, silver medalist(s) | John Yuda | Tanzania | 34:58 |
| 3rd place, bronze medalist(s) | Wilberforce Talel | Kenya | 35:20 |
| 4 | Richard Limo | Kenya | 35:26 |
| 5 | Charles Kamathi | Kenya | 35:29 |
| 6 | Albert Chepkurui | Kenya | 35:32 |
| 7 | Abderrahim Goumri | Morocco | 35:43 |
| 8 | Yonas Kifle | Eritrea | 35:47 |
| 9 | Enock Mitei | Kenya | 35:49 |
| 10 | Jaouad Gharib | Morocco | 35:57 |
| 11 | Abdi Abdirahman | United States | 36:03 |
| 12 | Assefa Mezegebu | Ethiopia | 36:06 |
Full results

Teams
| Rank | Team | Points |
|---|---|---|
| 1st place, gold medalist(s) | Kenya: Wilberforce Talel / 3; Richard Limo / 4; Charles Kamathi / 5; Albert Chepkurui / 6; (Enock Mitei) / (n/s); (Hosea Kogo) / (n/s) | 18 |
| 2nd place, silver medalist(s) | Ethiopia: Kenenisa Bekele / 1; Assefa Mezegebu / 11; Habte Jifar / 15; Fita Bayissa / 16; (Lemma Alemayehu) / (n/s); (Mesfin Hailu) / (n/s) | 43 |
| 3rd place, bronze medalist(s) | Morocco: Abderrahim Goumri / 7; Jaouad Gharib / 9; Saïd Berrioui / 19; Elarbi Khattabi / 23; (Hakim Radouan) / (DNF) | 58 |
| 4 | France | 71 |
| 5 | United States | 107 |
| 6 | Spain | 121 |
| 7 | Eritrea | 141 |
| 8 | Tanzania | 146 |
Full results

- Note: Athletes in parentheses did not score for the team result (n/s: nonscorer)

=== Men's short race (4.208 km) ===
Individual race
| Rank | Athlete | Country | Time |
|---|---|---|---|
| 1st place, gold medalist(s) | Kenenisa Bekele | Ethiopia | 12:11 |
| 2nd place, silver medalist(s) | Luke Kipkosgei | Kenya | 12:18 |
| 3rd place, bronze medalist(s) | Haylu Mekonnen | Ethiopia | 12:20 |
| 4 | Sammy Kipketer | Kenya | 12:26 |
| 5 | Craig Mottram | Australia | 12:27 |
| 6 | Julius Nyamu | Kenya | 12:30 |
| 7 | Antonio Jiménez | Spain | 12:30 |
| 8 | Joseph Kosgei | Kenya | 12:32 |
| 9 | Khalid El Amri | Morocco | 12:33 |
| 10 | Driss Maazouzi | France | 12:34 |
| 11 | Jorge Torres | United States | 12:35 |
| 12 | Saïd El Wardi | Morocco | 12:35 |
Full results

Teams
| Rank | Team | Points |
|---|---|---|
| 1st place, gold medalist(s) | Kenya: Luke Kipkosgei / 2; Sammy Kipketer / 4; Julius Nyamu / 6; Joseph Kosgei / 8; (Abraham Chebii) / (n/s); (Sammy Kiplagat) / (n/s) | 20 |
| 2nd place, silver medalist(s) | Ethiopia: Kenenisa Bekele / 1; Haylu Mekonnen / 3; Mohamed Awol / 13; Abiyote Abate / 15; (Million Wolde) / (n/s); (Berhanu Addane) / (n/s) | 32 |
| 3rd place, bronze medalist(s) | Spain: Antonio Jiménez / 7; Isaac Viciosa / 14; Alberto García / 16; Roberto García / 20; (José Luis Blanco) / (n/s); (Iván Hierro) / (n/s) | 57 |
| 4 | Morocco | 78 |
| 5 | United States | 113 |
| 6 | France | 117 |
| 7 | United Kingdom | 120 |
| 8 | Australia | 120 |
Full results

- Note: Athletes in parentheses did not score for the team result (n/s: nonscorer)

=== Junior men's race (7.974 km) ===
Individual race
| Rank | Athlete | Country | Time |
|---|---|---|---|
| 1st place, gold medalist(s) | Gebre-egziabher Gebremariam | Ethiopia | 23:18 |
| 2nd place, silver medalist(s) | Abel Cheruiyot | Kenya | 23:19 |
| 3rd place, bronze medalist(s) | Boniface Kiprop | Uganda | 23:28 |
| 4 | Thomas Kiplitan | Kenya | 23:33 |
| 5 | Eliud Kipchoge | Kenya | 23:39 |
| 6 | Sileshi Sihine | Ethiopia | 23:42 |
| 7 | Nicholas Kemboi | Kenya | 23:48 |
| 8 | Girma Assefa | Ethiopia | 23:49 |
| 9 | Abebe Dinkessa | Ethiopia | 23:50 |
| 10 | Moses Mosop | Kenya | 23:58 |
| 11 | Martin Toroitich | Uganda | 24:05 |
| 12 | Mike Kipyego | Kenya | 24:10 |
Full results

Teams
| Rank | Team | Points |
|---|---|---|
| 1st place, gold medalist(s) | Kenya: Abel Cheruiyot / 2; Thomas Kiplitan / 4; Eliud Kipchoge / 5; Nicholas Kemboi / 7; (Moses Mosop) / (n/s); (Mike Kipyego) / (n/s) | 18 |
| 2nd place, silver medalist(s) | Ethiopia: Gebre-egziabher Gebremariam / 1; Sileshi Sihen / 6; Girma Assefa / 8; Abebe Dinkessa / 9; (Tessema Absher) / (n/s); (Nasdr Abdesa) / (n/s) | 24 |
| 3rd place, bronze medalist(s) | Uganda: Boniface Kiprop / 3; Martin Toroitich / 10; Paul Wakou / 11; Francis Musani / 13 | 37 |
| 4 | Japan | 77 |
| 5 | Morocco | 89 |
| 6 | Zambia | 94 |
| 7 | United States | 113 |
| 8 | Algeria | 131 |
Full results

- Note: Athletes in parentheses did not score for the team result (n/s: nonscorer)

=== Senior women's race (7.974 km) ===
Individual race
| Rank | Athlete | Country | Time |
|---|---|---|---|
| 1st place, gold medalist(s) | Paula Radcliffe | United Kingdom | 26:55 |
| 2nd place, silver medalist(s) | Deena Drossin | United States | 27:04 |
| 3rd place, bronze medalist(s) | Colleen de Reuck | United States | 27:17 |
| 4 | Miwako Yamanaka | Japan | 27:19 |
| 5 | Eyerusalem Kuma | Ethiopia | 27:19 |
| 6 | Merima Denboba | Ethiopia | 27:21 |
| 7 | Leila Aman | Ethiopia | 27:25 |
| 8 | Rose Cheruiyot | Kenya | 27:28 |
| 9 | Pamela Chepchumba | Kenya | 27:30 |
| 10 | Teyiba Erkesso | Ethiopia | 27:32 |
| 11 | Leah Malot | Kenya | 27:35 |
| 12 | Jen Rhines | United States | 27:43 |
Full results

Teams
| Rank | Team | Points |
|---|---|---|
| 1st place, gold medalist(s) | Ethiopia: Eyerusalem Kuma / 5; Merima Denboba / 6; Leila Aman / 7; Teyiba Erkesso / 10; (Ayelech Worku) / (n/s); (Atalelech Ketema) / (n/s) | 28 |
| 2nd place, silver medalist(s) | United States: Deena Drossin / 2; Colleen de Reuck / 3; Jen Rhines / 12; Milena Glusac / 21; (Elva Dryer) / (n/s); (Amy Rudolph) / (n/s) | 38 |
| 3rd place, bronze medalist(s) | Kenya: Rose Cheruiyot / 8; Pamela Chepchumba / 9; Leah Malot / 11; Jane Omoro / 13; (Jepkorir Ayabei) / (n/s); (Monica Wangari) / (n/s) | 41 |
| 4 | Japan | 67 |
| 5 | United Kingdom | 69 |
| 6 | Portugal | 84 |
| 7 | Spain | 104 |
| 8 | France | 121 |
Full results

- Note: Athletes in parentheses did not score for the team result (n/s: nonscorer)

=== Women's short race (4.208 km) ===
Individual race
| Rank | Athlete | Country | Time |
|---|---|---|---|
| 1st place, gold medalist(s) | Edith Masai | Kenya | 13:30 |
| 2nd place, silver medalist(s) | Worknesh Kidane | Ethiopia | 13:36 |
| 3rd place, bronze medalist(s) | Isabella Ochichi | Kenya | 13:39 |
| 4 | Benita Johnson | Australia | 13:42 |
| 5 | Suzy Favor Hamilton | United States | 13:47 |
| 6 | Abebech Nigussie | Ethiopia | 13:53 |
| 7 | Sonia O'Sullivan | Ireland | 13:55 |
| 8 | Amane Godana | Ethiopia | 14:00 |
| 9 | Rosanna Martin | Italy | 14:01 |
| 10 | Anne Keenan-Buckley | Ireland | 14:03 |
| 11 | Carrie Tollefson | United States | 14:05 |
| 12 | Bouchra Chaâbi | Morocco | 14:06 |
Full results

Teams
| Rank | Team | Points |
|---|---|---|
| 1st place, gold medalist(s) | Ethiopia: Worknesh Kidane / 2; Abebech Nigussie / 6; Amane Godana / 8; Genet Gebregiorgis / 16; (Merima Hashim) / (n/s); (Sinkinesh Gudeta) / (n/s) | 32 |
| 2nd place, silver medalist(s) | Kenya: Edith Masai / 1; Isabella Ochichi / 3; Nancy Wambui / 13; Jane Kiptoo / 17; (Prisca Ngetich) / (n/s) | 34 |
| 3rd place, bronze medalist(s) | Ireland: Sonia O'Sullivan / 7; Anne Keenan-Buckley / 10; Rosemary Ryan / 18; Maria McCambridge / 50; (Valerie Vaughan) / (n/s); (Maureen Harrington) / (n/s) | 85 |
| 4 | Russia | 86 |
| 5 | Australia | 86 |
| 6 | United States | 90 |
| 7 | Portugal | 108 |
| 8 | Morocco | 133 |
Full results

- Note: Athletes in parentheses did not score for the team result (n/s: nonscorer)

=== Junior women's race (5.962 km) ===
Individual race
| Rank | Athlete | Country | Time |
|---|---|---|---|
| 1st place, gold medalist(s) | Viola Kibiwott | Kenya | 20:13 |
| 2nd place, silver medalist(s) | Tirunesh Dibaba | Ethiopia | 20:14 |
| 3rd place, bronze medalist(s) | Vivian Cheruiyot | Kenya | 20:22 |
| 4 | Fridah Domongole | Kenya | 20:23 |
| 5 | Peninah Chepchumba | Kenya | 20:24 |
| 6 | Bezunesh Bekele | Ethiopia | 20:34 |
| 7 | Mestawat Tufa | Ethiopia | 20:40 |
| 8 | Snezana Kostic | Yugoslavia | 20:43 |
| 9 | Melissa Rollison | Australia | 20:50 |
| 10 | Sharon Cherop | Kenya | 20:53 |
| 11 | Yenealem Ayano | Ethiopia | 20:59 |
| 12 | Valentine Koech | Kenya | 21:03 |
Full results

Teams
| Rank | Team | Points |
|---|---|---|
| 1st place, gold medalist(s) | Kenya: Viola Kibiwott / 1; Vivian Cheruiyot / 3; Fridah Domongole / 4; Peninah Chepchumba / 5; (Sharon Cherop) / (n/s); (Valentine Koech) / (n/s) | 13 |
| 2nd place, silver medalist(s) | Ethiopia: Tirunesh Dibaba / 2; Bezunesh Bekele / 6; Mestawat Tufa / 7; Yenealem Ayano / 9; (Meseret Defar) / (n/s); (Derbe Ayele) / (n/s) | 24 |
| 3rd place, bronze medalist(s) | Japan: Emi Ikeda / 10; Chiaki Iwamoto / 14; Mika Matsumoto / 17; Ayumi Hashimoto / 22; (Misaki Katsumata) / (n/s) | 63 |
| 4 | Australia | 77 |
| 5 | United States | 87 |
| 6 | Russia | 106 |
| 7 | France | 128 |
| 8 | United Kingdom | 130 |
Full results

- Note: Athletes in parentheses did not score for the team result (n/s: nonscorer)

== Medal table (unofficial) ==
* Host nation (Ireland)

| Rank | Nation | Gold | Silver | Bronze | Total |
|---|---|---|---|---|---|
| 1 | Kenya | 6 | 3 | 4 | 13 |
| 2 | Ethiopia | 5 | 6 | 1 | 12 |
| 3 | Great Britain | 1 | 0 | 0 | 1 |
| 4 | United States | 0 | 2 | 1 | 3 |
| 5 | Tanzania | 0 | 1 | 0 | 1 |
| 6 | Uganda | 0 | 0 | 2 | 2 |
| 7 | Ireland | 0 | 0 | 1 | 1 |
| 7 | Japan | 0 | 0 | 1 | 1 |
| 7 | Morocco | 0 | 0 | 1 | 1 |
| 7 | Spain | 0 | 0 | 1 | 1 |
| Totals (10 entries) | | 12 | 12 | 12 | 36 |

- Note: Totals include both individual and team medals, with medals in the team competition counting as one medal.

== Participation ==
According to an unofficial count, 664 athletes from 59 countries participated. This is in agreement with the official numbers as published. The announced athletes from Angola, Nigeria, Palestine, and Sierra Leone did not show.

- Algeria (30)
- Andorra (3)
- Argentina (5)
- Australia (19)
- Austria (1)
- Belarus (4)
- Belgium (27)
- Brazil (2)
- Burundi (4)
- Canada (34)
- Cayman Islands (2)
- Chile (5)
- DR Congo (1)
- Croatia (1)
- Egypt (3)
- Eritrea (15)
- Ethiopia (35)
- France (26)
- Gibraltar (4)
- Ireland (36)
- Italy (31)
- Japan (27)
- Kazakhstan (2)
- Kenya (35)
- Kyrgyzstan (4)
- Lesotho (2)
- Mexico (11)
- Morocco (23)
- Netherlands (6)
- New Zealand (8)
- Peru (1)
- Poland (1)
- Portugal (22)
- Romania (5)
- Russia (15)
- Rwanda (4)
- Seychelles (2)
- Slovakia (2)
- Slovenia (1)
- South Africa (14)
- Spain (36)
- Sri Lanka (6)
- Sudan (5)
- Eswatini (2)
- Sweden (2)
- Switzerland (2)
- Tajikistan (2)
- Tanzania (13)
- Tunisia (6)
- Turkey (3)
- Turkmenistan (2)
- Uganda (4)
- Ukraine (8)
- United Kingdom (36)
- United States (36)
- Uzbekistan (16)
- Yugoslavia (3)
- Zambia (6)
- Zimbabwe (3)

== See also ==
- 2002 IAAF World Cross Country Championships – Senior men's race
- 2002 IAAF World Cross Country Championships – Men's short race
- 2002 IAAF World Cross Country Championships – Junior men's race
- 2002 IAAF World Cross Country Championships – Senior women's race
- 2002 IAAF World Cross Country Championships – Women's short race
- 2002 IAAF World Cross Country Championships – Junior women's race
- 2002 in athletics (track and field)
