= 2002 IAAF World Cross Country Championships – Junior men's race =

Junior men's race at the 2002 IAAF World Cross Country Championships
- Organisers: IAAF
- Edition: 30th
- Date: March 24
- Host city: Dublin, Leinster, Ireland (Republic of Ireland)
- Venue: Leopardstown Racecourse
- Events: 1
- Distances: 7.974 km – Junior men
- Participation: 122 athletes from 34 nations

The Junior men's race at the 2002 IAAF World Cross Country Championships was held at the Leopardstown Racecourse near Dublin, Ireland, on March 24, 2002. Reports of the event were given in The New York Times, in the Herald, and for the IAAF.

Complete results for individuals, for teams, medallists, and the results of British athletes who took part were published.

== Race results ==
=== Junior men's race (7.974 km) ===
==== Individual ====
Rank	Athlete	Country	Time
1st place, gold medalist(s)	Gebre-egziabher Gebremariam	Ethiopia	23:18
2nd place, silver medalist(s)	Abel Cheruiyot	Kenya	23:19
3rd place, bronze medalist(s)	Boniface Kiprop	Uganda	23:28
4	Thomas Kiplitan	Kenya	23:33
5	Eliud Kipchoge	Kenya	23:39
6	Sileshi Sihen	Ethiopia	23:42
7	Nicholas Kemboi	Kenya	23:48
8	Girma Assefa	Ethiopia	23:49
9	Abebe Dinkessa	Ethiopia	23:50
10	Moses Mosop	Kenya	23:58
11	Martin Toroitich	Uganda	24:05
12	Mike Kipyego	Kenya	24:10
13	Tessema Absher	Ethiopia	24:26
14	Nasdr Abdesa	Ethiopia	24:26
15	Paul Wakou	Uganda	24:26
16	Joseph Simuchimba	Zambia	24:30
17	Francis Musani	Uganda	24:36
18	Alfred Nkuyi	Tanzania	24:37
19	Samson Kiflemariam	Eritrea	24:51
20	Ryuji Sorayama	Japan	24:55
21	Richard Bwalya	Zambia	24:56
22	Juan Luis Barrios	Mexico	24:57
23	Ahmed El Radi	Sudan	24:59
24	Atif Agebli	Morocco	25:00
25	Masato Imai	Japan	25:01
26	Sandile Lembetha	South Africa	25:03
27	Yoshiyuki Inai	Japan	25:04
28	Brahim Taleb	Morocco	25:12
29	Lahoussine Dhame	Morocco	25:13
30	Rod Koborsi	United States	25:14
31	Tom Sharland	United Kingdom	25:15
32	Yu Mitsuya	Japan	25:16
33	Billy Nelson (athlete)	United States	25:18
34	Naoto Kato	Japan	25:19
35	Joseph Mwila	Zambia	25:20
36	Mourad Naami	Algeria	25:22
37	Driss Bensaïd	Morocco	25:25
38	Atef Zaamouchi	Algeria	25:26
39	Bobby Lockhart	United States	25:26
40	Arkangelo Roko	Sudan	25:28
41	Yong-Sung Leal	United States	25:30
42	Philipo Yakobo	Tanzania	25:31
43	Halil Akkaş	Turkey	25:33
44	Javier Guerra	Spain	25:33
45	Yassine Bensghir	Morocco	25:33
46	Minoru Ikebe	Japan	25:34
47	Stefano Cugusi	Italy	25:36
48	Simon Tesfai	Eritrea	25:38
49	Rachid Soumati	Algeria	25:41
50	Mohamed Chekalil	Algeria	25:42
51	Johannes Komane	South Africa	25:46
52	Joe Dionne	Canada	25:46
53	Fernando Fernandes	Brazil	25:47
54	Timothy Moore	United States	25:47
55	Clinton Perrett	Australia	25:48
56	Vanwell Bwale	Zambia	25:51
57	Teshome Woldegaber	Eritrea	25:52
58	Stefano Scaini	Italy	25:52
59	Selahattin Selçuk	Turkey	25:55
60	Aïssa Dahmar	Algeria	25:56
61	Simon Bairu	Canada	25:57
62	Mohamed Fadil	Morocco	25:59
63	Mandla Maseko	South Africa	26:00
64	Arturo Merced	Mexico	26:01
65	Antonio Vaquero	Spain	26:02
66	Carlos Silva	Portugal	26:03
67	Radosław Popławski	Poland	26:04
68	Matthew Lole	United Kingdom	26:05
69	Zaki Hussein	Egypt	26:06
70	Julio César Martínez	Mexico	26:08
71	Jan Mokwena	South Africa	26:08
72	Fabiano Joseph	Tanzania	26:09
73	Hussein Ibrahim	Sudan	26:11
74	Hamaza Hamid	Sudan	26:13
75	Aleksandr Mikhaylov	Belarus	26:15
76	Piet Desmet	Belgium	26:18
77	Francesco Bona	Italy	26:21
78	Dylan Wykes	Canada	26:23
79	Amar Hellali	Algeria	26:23
80	Arturo Casado	Spain	26:26
81	Zach Sabatino	United States	26:26
82	Steven Ablitt	United Kingdom	26:27
83	Mats Granström	Sweden	26:29
84	Matthew Bowser	United Kingdom	26:29
85	Yoan Meudec	France	26:32
86	Stijn van Es	Belgium	26:34
87	Mark Christie	Ireland	26:38
88	Santiago Navarro	Spain	26:39
89	Abdelkader Mahmoudi	France	26:40
90	William Harty	Ireland	26:40
91	Adam Hortian	Canada	26:40
92	Samuel Moleshioa	South Africa	26:44
93	Dereje Rabattoni	Italy	26:45
94	Philippe Le Ferrand	France	26:47
95	David Jones	United Kingdom	26:50
96	Morgan Titus	Canada	26:50
97	Kristof Mouton	Belgium	26:54
98	Dries Busselot	Belgium	27:00
99	Kurt Benninger	Canada	27:03
100	Marcus van der Koelen	Netherlands	27:06
101	José Maria Estirado	Spain	27:08
102	Alexis Traub	France	27:08
103	Joseph Sweeney	Ireland	27:12
104	Vitaliy Kolodin	Turkmenistan	27:21
105	Chris Watson	United Kingdom	27:26
106	Denis Galerin	Belgium	27:34
107	Kevin Seaward	Ireland	27:41
108	Francisco Bachiller	Spain	27:42
109	Ghislain Guenier	France	27:46
110	Vadim Bezyanov	Uzbekistan	27:48
111	Alan McCormack	Ireland	27:59
112	Eoin Higgins	Ireland	28:13
113	Michael Sanchez	Gibraltar	28:35
114	Antonio Trapani	Italy	29:16
115	Sherzod Poziljonov	Uzbekistan	29:31
116	Timur Isamutdinov	Uzbekistan	29:40
117	Lee Taylor	Gibraltar	31:04
118	Ivan Morozov	Uzbekistan	31:07
119	Junior Hines	Cayman Islands	33:25
—	Ali Omer	Sudan	DNF
—	Nozimjon Irmatov	Tajikistan	DNF
—	Abdil Ceylan	Turkey	DNF
—	Mohamed Abd El Bashir	Sudan	DNS
—	Hamisi Mori	Tanzania	DNS
—	Moustafa Ahmed Shebto	Uganda	DNS
—	Moses Ndiema Kipsiro	Uganda	DNS

==== Teams ====
Rank	Team	Points
1st place, gold medalist(s)	Kenya: Abel Cheruiyot / 2; Thomas Kiplitan / 4; Eliud Kipchoge / 5; Nicholas Kemboi / 7; (Moses Mosop) / (n/s); (Mike Kipyego) / (n/s)	18
2nd place, silver medalist(s)	Ethiopia: Gebre-egziabher Gebremariam / 1; Sileshi Sihen / 6; Girma Assefa / 8; Abebe Dinkessa / 9; (Tessema Absher) / (n/s); (Nasdr Abdesa) / (n/s)	24
3rd place, bronze medalist(s)	Uganda: Boniface Kiprop / 3; Martin Toroitich / 10; Paul Wakou / 11; Francis Musani / 13	37
4	Japan: Ryuji Sorayama / 14; Masato Imai / 18; Yoshiyuki Inai / 20; Yu Mitsuya / 25; (Naoto Kato) / (n/s); (Minoru Ikebe) / (n/s)	77
5	Morocco: Atif Agebli / 17; Brahim Taleb / 21; Lahoussine Dhame / 22; Driss Bensaïd / 29; (Yassine Bensghir) / (n/s); (Mohamed Fadil) / (n/s)	89
6	Zambia: Joseph Simuchimba / 12; Richard Bwalya / 15; Joseph Mwila / 27; Vanwell Bwale / 40	94
7	United States: Rod Koborsi / 23; Billy Nelson (athlete) / 26; Bobby Lockhart / 31; Yong-Sung Leal / 33; (Timothy Moore) / (n/s); (Zach Sabatino) / (n/s)	113
8	Algeria: Mourad Naami / 28; Atef Zaamouchi / 30; Rachid Soumati / 36; Mohamed Chekalil / 37; (Aïssa Dahmar) / (n/s); (Amar Hellali) / (n/s)	131
9	Sudan: Ahmed El Radi / 16; Arkangelo Roko / 32; Hussein Ibrahim / 47; Hamaza Hamid / 48; (Ali Omer) / (DNF)	143
10	South Africa: Sandile Lembetha / 19; Johannes Komane / 38; Mandla Maseko / 43; Jan Mokwena / 46; (Samuel Moleshioa) / (n/s)	146
11	United Kingdom: Tom Sharland / 24; Matthew Lole / 45; Steven Ablitt / 53; Matthew Bowser / 54; (David Jones) / (n/s); (Chris Watson) / (n/s)	176
12	Spain: Javier Guerra / 34; Antonio Vaquero / 44; Arturo Casado / 52; Santiago Navarro / 58; (José Maria Estirado) / (n/s); (Francisco Bachiller) / (n/s)	188
13	Italy: Stefano Cugusi / 35; Stefano Scaini / 41; Francesco Bona / 50; Dereje Rabattoni / 62; (Antonio Trapani) / (n/s)	188
14	Canada: Joe Dionne / 39; Simon Bairu / 42; Dylan Wykes / 51; Adam Hortian / 61; (Morgan Titus) / (n/s); (Kurt Benninger) / (n/s)	193
15	Belgium: Piet Desmet / 49; Stijn van Es / 56; Kristof Mouton / 64; Dries Busselot / 65; (Denis Galerin) / (n/s)	234
16	France: Yoan Meudec / 55; Abdelkader Mahmoudi / 59; Philippe Le Ferrand / 63; Alexis Traub / 66; (Ghislain Guenier) / (n/s)	243
17	Ireland: Mark Christie / 57; William Harty / 60; Joseph Sweeney / 67; Kevin Seaward / 68; (Alan McCormack) / (n/s); (Eoin Higgins) / (n/s)	252
18	Uzbekistan: Vadim Bezyanov / 69; Sherzod Poziljonov / 70; Timur Isamutdinov / 71; Ivan Morozov / 72	282

- Note: Athletes in parentheses did not score for the team result (n/s: nonscorer)

== Participation ==
According to an unofficial count, 122 athletes from 34 countries participated in the Junior men's race. This is in agreement with the official numbers as published.

- Algeria (6)
- Australia (1)
- Belarus (1)
- Belgium (5)
- Brazil (1)
- Canada (6)
- Cayman Islands (1)
- Egypt (1)
- Eritrea (3)
- Ethiopia (6)
- France (5)
- Gibraltar (2)
- Ireland (6)
- Italy (5)
- Japan (6)
- Kenya (6)
- Mexico (3)
- Morocco (6)
- Netherlands (1)
- Poland (1)
- Portugal (1)
- South Africa (5)
- Spain (6)
- Sudan (5)
- Sweden (1)
- Tajikistan (1)
- Tanzania (3)
- Turkey (3)
- Turkmenistan (1)
- Uganda (4)
- United Kingdom (6)
- United States (6)
- Uzbekistan (4)
- Zambia (4)

== See also ==
- 2002 IAAF World Cross Country Championships – Senior men's race
- 2002 IAAF World Cross Country Championships – Men's short race
- 2002 IAAF World Cross Country Championships – Senior women's race
- 2002 IAAF World Cross Country Championships – Women's short race
- 2002 IAAF World Cross Country Championships – Junior women's race
