= Viola Kibiwot =

Kenyan middle-distance runner

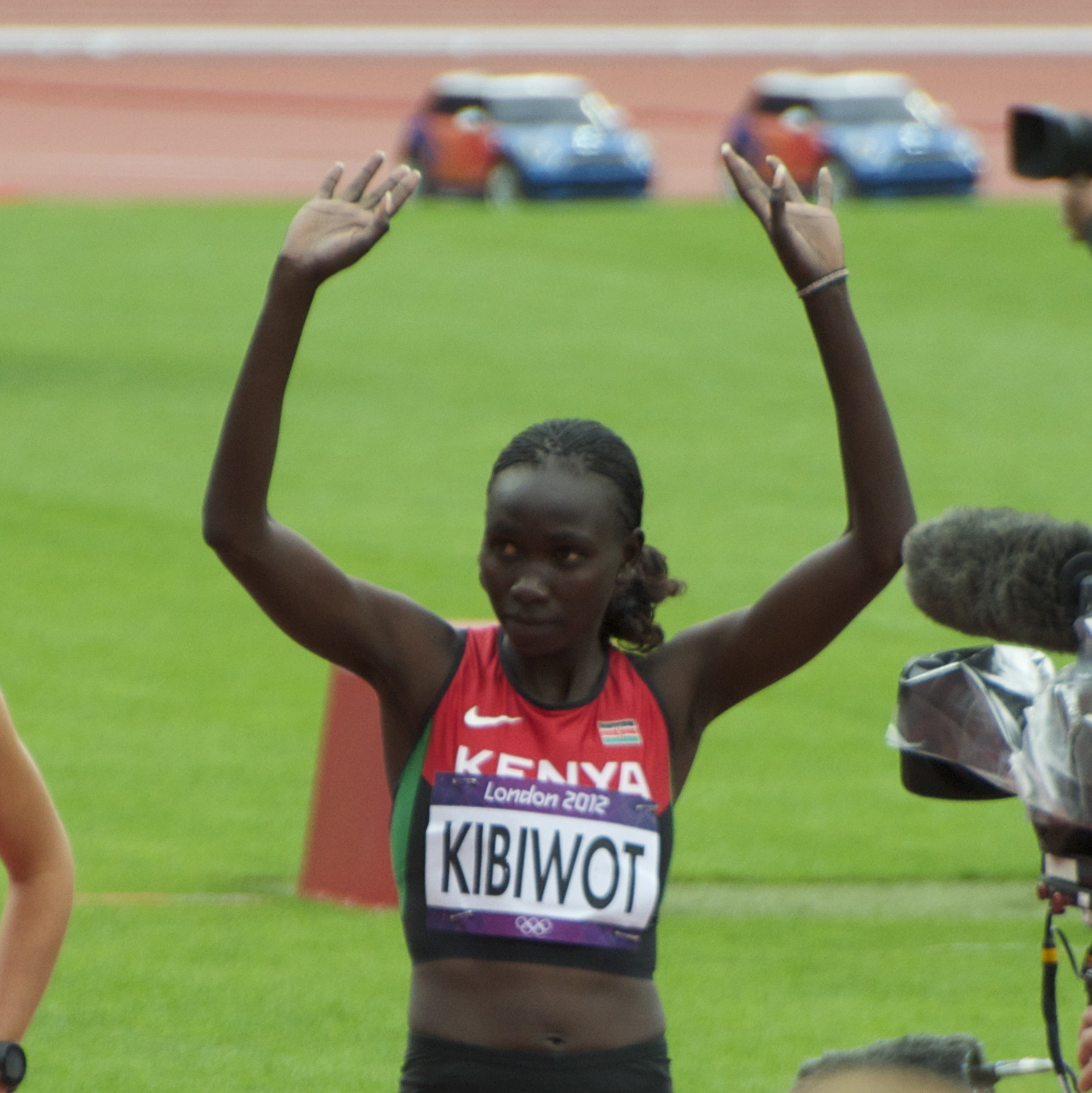
- Kibiwot at the 2012 Olympics

Medal record

Women's athletics

Representing Kenya

IAAF World Cross Country Championships
Gold medal – first place	2001 Ostend	Junior race
Gold medal – first place	2002 Dublin	Junior race
Bronze medal – third place	2000 Vilamoura	Junior race

World Junior Championships
Gold medal – first place	2002 Kingston	1500 m

Viola Jelagat Kibiwot (born 22 December 1983 in Keiyo District) is a runner from Kenya who specialises in the 1500 metres.

Kibiwot won her first international medal as a junior runner at the 2000 IAAF World Cross Country Championships, where she took the bronze medal for Kenya. Consecutive world junior cross country titles followed at the 2001 and 2002 editions of the event, and she also claimed the gold medal over 1500 m at the 2002 World Junior Championships in Athletics.

After becoming a senior runner, she struggled to match her junior success. She was outside of the top twenty in the senior short race at the 2003 IAAF World Cross Country Championships, and again at the 2005 race. She was seventh on the track at the 2006 Commonwealth Games, but appeared to make her breakthrough over 1500 m at the 2007 World Championships in Athletics with a fifth-place finish in a personal best time of 4:02.10 minutes in the final. She narrowly missed out on a medal at the 2007 IAAF World Athletics Final, coming fourth.

She competed at the 2008 Summer Olympics, but failed to build upon her progress on the global stage and did not advance beyond the heats. At the 2009 World Championships she did not get past the semi-finals stage. Kibiwoot ran on the 2010 IAAF Diamond League circuit, but never made the top three in the event. She came seventh in the 1500 m at the 2010 Commonwealth Games in Delhi. Kibiwot won her first senior continental medal at the 2011 African Cross Country Championships, taking the silver medal behind Mercy Cherono and helping Kenya to the team title.

She was eliminated in the semi-finals of the 1500 m at the 2011 World Championships in Athletics. She changed her focus to longer distances as a result and performed better on the world stage, taking sixth at the 2012 Olympic 5000 m final and fourth at the 2013 World Championships 5000 m final. At the 2013 World Cross Country Championships she helped Kenya to the team title with her seventh-place finish. An outing over four miles on the roads in October 2013 saw her run the world best for the distance, as she completed the 4 mijl van Groningen race in 19:20 minutes.

== Achievements ==
Year	Competition	Venue	Position	Event	Notes
Representing Kenya
2000	World Cross Country Championships	Vilamoura, Portugal	3rd	Junior race (6.29 km)	20:36
2001	World Cross Country Championships	Ostend, Belgium	1st	Junior race (5.9 km)	22:05
2001	African Junior Championships	Réduit, Mauritius	4th	800 m	2:10.25
2001	African Junior Championships	Réduit, Mauritius	4th	1500 m	4:26.27
2002	World Cross Country Championships	Dublin, Ireland	1st	Junior race (5.962 km)	20:13
2002	World Junior Championships	Kingston, Jamaica	1st	1500 m	4:12.57
2003	World Cross Country Championships	Lausanne, Switzerland	22nd	Short race (4.03 km)	13:28
2005	World Cross Country Championships	Saint-Étienne, France	23rd	Short race (4.196 km)	14:10
2006	Commonwealth Games	Melbourne, Australia	7th	1500 m	4:08.74
2007	World Championships	Osaka, Japan	5th	1500 m	4:02.10
2007	World Athletics Final	Stuttgart, Germany	4th	1500 m	4:06.00
2008	Olympic Games	Beijing, China	5th (heats)	1500 m	4:15.62
2009	World Championships	Berlin, Germany	8th (semis)	1500 m	4:06.88
2010	Commonwealth Games	New Delhi, India	7th	1500 m	4:08.79
2011	African Cross Country Championships	Cape Town, South Africa	2nd	Senior 8 km	27:14
2011	World Championships	Daegu, South Korea	7th (semis)	1500 m	4:08.64
2012	Olympic Games	London, United Kingdom	6th	5000 m	15:11.59
2013	World Cross Country Championships	Bydgoszcz, Poland	7th	Senior race (8 km)	24:46
2013	World Championships	Moscow, Russia	4th	5000 m	15:01.67
2015	World Championships	Beijing, China	4th	5000 m	14:46.16

=== Personal bests ===
- 1500 metres - 4:02.10 min (2007)
- 3000 metres - 8:40.14 min (2003)
- Two miles - 9:12.59 (2014)
- 5000 metres - 14:33.48 min (2013)
