= Abebech Negussie =

Ethiopian middle-distance runner

Abebech Negussie (born 2 January 1983 in Arsi) is a retired Ethiopian middle distance runner, who specialized in 1500 metres. She represented Ethiopia in that event at the 2000 Sydney Olympics and the 2001 World Championships in Athletics.

== International competitions ==
Year	Competition	Venue	Position	Event	Notes
Representing Ethiopia
2000	World Junior Championships	Santiago, Chile	1st	1500 m	4:19.93
2001	World Cross Country Championships	Ostend, Belgium	2nd	Junior race (5.9 km)	22:05
2001	World Cross Country Championships	Ostend, Belgium	1st	Junior team competition	16 pts
2002	World Cross Country Championships	Dublin, Ireland	6th	Short race (4.208 km)	13:53
2002	World Cross Country Championships	Dublin, Ireland	1st	Team competition	32 pts

== Personal bests ==
- 800 metres - 2:04.13 min (2000)
- 1500 metres - 4:06.01 min (2001)
