= Saïd Berioui =

Moroccan long-distance runner

Medal record

Men's athletics

Representing Morocco

African Championships
Silver medal – second place	2000 Algiers	5000 m

Saïd Berioui (born 3 June 1975) is a Moroccan retired long-distance runner who specialized in the 10,000 metres.

== International competitions ==
Year	Competition	Venue	Position	Event	Notes
Representing Morocco
1997	World Championships	Athens, Greece	17th	10,000 m	29:22.05
1997	Mediterranean Games	Bari, Italy	3rd	5000 m	13:53.98
1998	World Junior Championships	Annecy, France	—	10,000m	DQ (IAAF rule 141)
1999	World Championships	Seville, Spain	16th	10,000 m	28:46.77
2000	Olympic Games	Sydney, Australia	6th	10,000 m	27:37.83
2000	African Championships	Algiers, Algeria	2nd	5000 m	13:31.75
2001	World Indoor Championships	Lisbon, Portugal	13th	3000 m	8:04.38
2001	World Championships	Edmonton, Canada	21st	10,000 m	28:38.80
2002	World Cross Country Championships	Dublin, Ireland	21st	Long race (11.998 km)	36:27
2002	World Cross Country Championships	Dublin, Ireland	3rd	Team competition	58 pts

== Personal bests ==
- 3000 metres – 7:41.83 min (2003)
- 5000 metres – 13:15.10 min (1999)
- 10,000 metres – 27:31.00 min (1998)
