= Athletics at the 2002 Commonwealth Games – Men's 10,000 metres =

Men's 10,000 metres at the Commonwealth Games

The men's 10,000 metres event at the 2002 Commonwealth Games was held on 26 July.

== Results ==
Rank	Name	Nationality	Time	Notes
1st place, gold medalist(s)	Wilberforce Talel	Kenya	27:45.39	GR
2nd place, silver medalist(s)	Paul Malakwen Kosgei	Kenya	27:45.46	
3rd place, bronze medalist(s)	John Yuda Msuri	Tanzania	27:45.78	PB
4	John Cheruiyot Korir	Kenya	27:45.83	
5	Martin Sulle	Tanzania	28:15.60	
6	Jeff Schiebler	Canada	28:29.22	
7	Sean Kaley	Canada	28:31.99	
8	Michael Aish	New Zealand	28:35.27	
9	Sisay Bezabeh	Australia	28:37.12	
10	John Henwood	New Zealand	28:51.33	
11	Glen Stewart	Scotland	29:04.03	
12	Robert Denmark	England	29:08.59	
13	Rodwell Kamwendo	Malawi	29:11.13	NR
14	Andres Jones	Wales	29:15.44	
15	Jon Wild	England	29:18.17	
16	Dean Cavuoto	Australia	29:18.38	
17	Siphesihle Mdluli	Swaziland	29:19.71	NR
18	Brett Cartwright	Australia	29:21.29	
19	Ian Hudspith	England	29:33.43	
	Boniface Kiprop	Uganda	DNS	
