= Rosemary Ryan =

Irish long-distance runner

Medal record

Women's athletics

Representing Ireland

World Cross Country Championships
Bronze medal – third place	2002 Dublin	Team

European Cross Country Championships
Silver medal – second place	2003 Edinburgh	Team

Rosemary Ryan (born 8 November 1975) is a retired Irish long-distance runner who was on the Ireland 2000 Summer Olympics team. Born in Limerick, she attended the University of Limerick between 1996 and 1998. She competed for Ireland five times at the IAAF World Cross Country Championships between 1999 and 2006.

== Running career ==
Ryan competed for Boston University where she was an All-American.

She competed at the 2000 Olympics in the 5000 metres where she finished in eighth place in her heat race.

In 2001, she competed in the World University Games finishing fourth.

In 2002, she won a team bronze medal at the 2002 IAAF World Cross Country Championships for the short race.

In 2003, Ryan competed in the 2003 IAAF World Half Marathon Championships and won the Irish national half marathon title (a title she also won in 1999).
