= Joseph Kosgei =

Kenyan middle-distance runner

Joseph Kosgei (born 25 August 1974) is a Kenyan middle-distance runner who specializes in the 3000 metres. He was a team gold medallist at the 2002 IAAF World Cross Country Championships.

== International competitions ==
Year	Competition	Venue	Position	Event	Notes
2002	World Cross Country Championships	Dublin, Ireland	8th	Short race	
2002	World Cross Country Championships	Dublin, Ireland	1st	Team competition	
2004	World Athletics Final	Monte Carlo, Monaco	8th	3000 m	

== Personal bests ==
- 3000 metres - 7:39.38 min (2002)
- 5000 metres - 13:11.32 min (2004)
