= Wilberforce Talel =

Kenyan runner

Wilberforce Talel (born 10 January 1980 in Marakwet District) is runner from Kenya. He is a Commonwealth Games gold medalist and has competed several times at the IAAF World Cross Country Championships. He is the current 10,000 metres Commonwealth Games record holder.

== International competitions ==
Year	Competition	Venue	Position	Event	Notes
2000	World Cross Country Championships	Vilamoura, Portugal	5th	Long race	
2000	World Cross Country Championships	Vilamoura, Portugal	1st	Team competition	
2002	World Cross Country Championships	Dublin, Ireland	3rd	Long race	
2002	World Cross Country Championships	Dublin, Ireland	1st	Team competition	
2002	Commonwealth Games	Manchester, United Kingdom	1st	10,000 m	
2003	World Championships	Paris, France	6th	10,000 m	
2004	World Cross Country Championships	Brussels, Belgium	10th	Long race	
2004	World Cross Country Championships	Brussels, Belgium	2nd	Team competition	
2005	World Cross Country Championships	St Etienne, France	11th	Long race	
2005	World Cross Country Championships	St Etienne, France	2nd	Team competition	

== Personal bests ==
Distance	Time	Location	Date
5000 metres	13:13.15	Stockholm	1 August 2000
10,000 metres	27:33.60	Paris	24 August 2003
10K run	28:36	Jakarta	2 July 2006
Half marathon	1:01:17	Salzburg	28 April 2002
Marathon	2:13:35	Vienna	29 April 2007

== See also ==
- List of Commonwealth Games medallists in athletics (men)
