= 2003 European Cross Country Championships =

Coordinates: 55°57′07″N 3°10′07″W

- Organisers: EAA
- Edition: 10th
- Date: 14 December
- Host city: Edinburgh, United Kingdom
- Events: 4
- Distances: 10.095 km – Men; 6.595 km – Women; 6.595 km – Junior men 4.52 km – Junior women

The 10th European Cross Country Championships were held at Edinburgh in Scotland on 14 December 2003. Serhiy Lebid took his fourth title in the men's competition and Paula Radcliffe her second title in the women's race.

== Results ==
=== Men individual 10.095km ===
Pos.	Runners	Time
1st place, gold medalist(s)	(Ukraine) Serhiy Lebid	30:47
2nd place, silver medalist(s)	(Spain) Juan Carlos de la Ossa	31:08
3rd place, bronze medalist(s)	(Portugal) Eduardo Henriques	31:15
4.	(Belgium) Tom van Hooste	31:18
5.	(Ukraine) Yevhen Bozhko	31:19
6.	(Spain) Fabián Roncero	31:23
7.	(France) Mustapha Essaïd	31:26
8.	(France) El Hassan Lahssini	31:29
9.	(Italy) Umberto Pusterla	31:32
10.	(France) Driss El Himer	31:34
11.	(Austria) Günther Weidlinger	31:35
12.	(Spain) Iván Hierro	31:35

=== Men teams ===
Pos.	Team	Points
1st place, gold medalist(s)	France; Mustapha Essaïd; Driss El Himer; Khalid Zoubaa; El Hassan Lahssini	47
2nd place, silver medalist(s)	Spain; Juan Carlos de la Ossa; Fabián Roncero; Iván Hierro; Kamal Ziani	47
3rd place, bronze medalist(s)	Portugal; Eduardo Henriques; Fernando Silva; Ricardo Ribas; José Ramos	57
4.	Italy	71
5.	Belgium	96
6.	Russia
7.	United Kingdom
8.	Sweden	132

=== Women individual 6.595km ===
Pos.	Runners	Time
1st place, gold medalist(s)	(United Kingdom) Paula Radcliffe	22:04
2nd place, silver medalist(s)	(Turkey) Elvan Abeylegesse	22:13
3rd place, bronze medalist(s)	(Hungary) Anikó Kálovics	22:26
4.	(Republic of Ireland) Sonia O'Sullivan	22:36
5.	(United Kingdom) Hayley Yelling	22:44
6.	(Serbia and Montenegro) Olivera Jevtić	22:45
7.	(Poland) Justyna Bąk	22:47
8.	(United Kingdom) Liz Yelling	22:49
9.	(Italy) Patrizia Tisi	22:50
10.	(Russia) Galina Bogomolova	22:54
11.	(United Kingdom) Hayley Tullett	22:59
12.	(United Kingdom) Kathy Butler	23:00

=== Women teams ===
Pos.	Team	Points
1st place, gold medalist(s)	United Kingdom; Paula Radcliffe; Hayley Yelling; Liz Yelling; Hayley Tullett	25
2nd place, silver medalist(s)	Ireland; Sonia O'Sullivan; Rosemary Ryan; Anne Keenan-Buckley; Catherina McKiernan	78
3rd place, bronze medalist(s)	Portugal; Analía Rosa; Helena Sampaio; Analídia Torre; Inês Monteiro	84
4.	France	84
5.	Russia	114
6.	Belgium	116
7.	Italy	126
8.	Spain	130

=== Junior men individual 6.595km ===
Pos.	Runners	Time
1st place, gold medalist(s)	(Russia) Yevgeniy Rybakov	20:52
2nd place, silver medalist(s)	(Russia) Anatoliy Rybakov	20:52
3rd place, bronze medalist(s)	(Russia) Aleksey Reunkov	20:53
4.	(Romania) Cosmin Suteu	20:58
5.	(Romania) Marius Ionescu	21:04
6.	(Republic of Ireland) Mark Christie	21:07
7.	(Spain) Francisco Bachiller	21:09
8.	(France) Jeremy Pierrat	21:12

=== Junior men teams ===
Pos.	Team	Points
1st place, gold medalist(s)	Russia; Yevgeniy Rybakov; Anatoliy Rybakov; Aleksey Reunkov; Sergey Ryazantsev	20
2nd place, silver medalist(s)	Romania	31
3rd place, bronze medalist(s)	Spain	46
4.	United Kingdom	92
5.	France	106
6.	Germany	129
7.	Ireland	142
8.	Poland	161

=== Junior women individual 4.52 km ===
Pos.	Runners	Time
1st place, gold medalist(s)	(Latvia) Inna Poluškina	15:32
2nd place, silver medalist(s)	(Serbia and Montenegro) Snežana Kostić	15:57
3rd place, bronze medalist(s)	(United Kingdom) Charlotte Dale	16:04
4.	(Belarus) Volha Minina	16:06
5.	(United Kingdom) Faye Fullerton	16:07
6.	(Russia) Viktoriya Trushenko	16:10
7.	(Serbia and Montenegro) Azra Eminović	16:20
8.	(United Kingdom) Regina Hamzina	16:23

=== Junior women teams ===
Pos.	Team	Points
1st place, gold medalist(s)	United Kingdom; Charlotte Dale; Faye Fullerton; Danielle Barnes; Aine Hoban	32
2nd place, silver medalist(s)	Russia	53
3rd place, bronze medalist(s)	Germany	63
4.	Romania	112
5.	Belarus	116
6.	Spain	129
7.	France	135
8.	Ireland	137
