= Anne Keenan-Buckley =

Irish middle-distance runner

Medal record

Women's athletics

Representing Ireland

World Cross Country Championships
Bronze medal – third place	2002 Dublin	Team

EAA European Cross Country Championships
Silver medal – second place	2003 Edinburgh	Team

Anne Keenan-Buckley in Portlaoise, County Laois) is a retired Irish middle distance runner who was on the Ireland 1988 Summer Olympic team.

== Running career ==
Keenan-Buckley competed at 1988 Olympics in the 3000 metres where she finished in 24th place.

In 2002, she won a team bronze medal at the 2002 IAAF World Cross Country Championships for the short race.

== Administration career ==
From 2006-2012 Keenan-Buckley was the manager of the Ireland cross country team.
