= 2002 IAAF World Cross Country Championships – Senior men's race =

Senior men's race at the 2002 IAAF World Cross Country Championships
- Organisers: IAAF
- Edition: 30th
- Date: March 24
- Host city: Dublin, Leinster, Ireland (Republic of Ireland)
- Venue: Leopardstown Racecourse
- Events: 1
- Distances: 11.998 km – Senior men
- Participation: 141 athletes from 37 nations

The Senior men's race at the 2002 IAAF World Cross Country Championships was held at the Leopardstown Racecourse near Dublin, Ireland, on March 24, 2002. Reports of the event were given in The New York Times, in the Herald, and for the IAAF.

Complete results for individuals, for teams, medallists, and the results of British athletes who took part were published.

== Race results ==
=== Senior men's race (11.998 km) ===
==== Individual ====
Rank	Athlete	Country	Time
1st place, gold medalist(s)	Kenenisa Bekele	Ethiopia	34:52
2nd place, silver medalist(s)	John Yuda	Tanzania	34:58
3rd place, bronze medalist(s)	Wilberforce Talel	Kenya	35:20
4	Richard Limo	Kenya	35:26
5	Charles Kamathi	Kenya	35:29
6	Albert Chepkurui	Kenya	35:32
7	Abderrahim Goumri	Morocco	35:43
8	Yonas Kifle	Eritrea	35:47
9	Enock Mitei	Kenya	35:49
10	Jaouad Gharib	Morocco	35:57
11	Abdi Abdirahman	United States	36:03
12	Assefa Mezegebu	Ethiopia	36:06
13	Smail Sghir	France	36:07
14	Meb Keflezighi	United States	36:09
15	Mustapha Essaïd	France	36:10
16	Habte Jifar	Ethiopia	36:11
17	Fita Bayissa	Ethiopia	36:14
18	Samson Ramadhani	Tanzania	36:16
19	Eduardo Henriques	Portugal	36:20
20	Lemma Alemayehu	Ethiopia	36:25
21	Saïd Berrioui	Morocco	36:27
22	Jean-Berchmans Ndayisenga	Burundi	36:29
23	El Hassan Lahssini	France	36:30
24	Dathan Ritzenhein	United States	36:31
25	Yevgeniy Bozhko	Ukraine	36:33
26	José Manuel García	Spain	36:34
27	Elarbi Khattabi	Morocco	36:34
28	Michael Ngaaseke	Zimbabwe	36:35
29	Hosea Kogo	Kenya	36:36
30	Zersenay Tadesse	Eritrea	36:37
31	Obed Mutanya	Zambia	36:37
32	Kamiel Maase	Netherlands	36:40
33	Mohamed Serbouti	France	36:40
34	Tom van Hooste	Belgium	36:40
35	José Manuel Martínez	Spain	36:40
36	Makoto Otsu	Japan	36:41
37	Dean Cavuoto	Australia	36:41
38	Mauricio Díaz	Chile	36:41
39	Claes Nyberg	Sweden	36:42
40	Teodoro Cuñado	Spain	36:48
41	Samir Moussaoui	Algeria	36:49
42	Gabriele De Nard	Italy	36:51
43	Sam Haughian	United Kingdom	36:53
44	Peter Matthews	Ireland	36:59
45	Rachid Berradi	Italy	37:07
46	Brett Cartwright	Australia	37:07
47	Alberto Maravilha	Portugal	37:08
48	Mark Carroll	Ireland	37:09
49	Allen Graffin	United Kingdom	37:10
50	Iván Sánchez	Spain	37:10
51	Ahmed Naïli	Algeria	37:11
52	Róbert Štefko	Slovakia	37:12
53	Tau Khotso	Lesotho	37:13
54	Dieudonné Disi	Rwanda	37:14
55	Paulo Gomes	Portugal	37:20
56	George Mofokeng	South Africa	37:23
57	José Carlos Adán	Spain	37:26
58	Abel Chimukoko	Zimbabwe	37:28
59	Mustapha Benacer	Algeria	37:30
60	Matt Smith	United Kingdom	37:32
61	Tomonori Watanabe	Japan	37:32
62	José Rios	Spain	37:34
63	Umberto Pusterla	Italy	37:35
64	Seamus Power	Ireland	37:36
65	Habtai Kifletsion	Eritrea	37:36
66	Pacifique Ayabusa	Rwanda	37:36
67	Shinichiro Okuda	Japan	37:37
68	Ian Hudspith	United Kingdom	37:38
69	Glynn Tromans	United Kingdom	37:40
70	Koen van Rie	Belgium	37:45
71	Daniel Andrew Sipe	Tanzania	37:46
72	Kamel Kohil	Algeria	37:46
73	Kenjiro Jitsui	Japan	37:47
74	Hassan El Ahmadi	France	37:49
75	Khalid Zoubaa	France	37:50
76	Brad Tighe	Canada	37:51
77	Yukihiro Motoda	Japan	37:55
78	Tesfayohannes Mesfen	Eritrea	37:55
79	Egide Manirazika	Burundi	37:56
80	Abdelkrim Benzai	Algeria	37:57
81	Rachid Safari	Rwanda	37:57
82	Kim Gillard	Australia	37:59
83	Eric Sindayigaya	Burundi	38:00
84	Azzedine Sakhri	Algeria	38:02
85	Sisay Bezabeh	Australia	38:05
86	Clint Wells	United States	38:08
87	Yuki Yamamoto	Japan	38:08
88	Giovanni Gualdi	Italy	38:15
89	Jean Bosco Ndagijimana	Rwanda	38:16
90	Hélder Ornelas	Portugal	38:18
91	Siphesihle Mdluli	Eswatini	38:18
92	Fiachra Lombard	Ireland	38:21
93	Greg Jimmerson	United States	38:22
94	Sunil Jayaweera	Sri Lanka	38:25
95	Gianni Crepaldi	Italy	38:30
96	Hugo Romero	Mexico	38:31
97	Alberto Chaíça	Portugal	38:34
98	Reid Coolsaet	Canada	38:36
99	Julian Dwyer	Australia	38:37
100	Christian Nemeth	Belgium	38:38
101	Mesfin Hailu	Ethiopia	38:39
102	Matt O'Dowd	United Kingdom	38:41
103	Jollyn Kanyika	Zambia	38:43
104	José Alberto Montenegro	Argentina	38:51
105	David Milne	Canada	38:53
106	Alex Hutchinson	Canada	38:56
107	Julius Gidabuday	Tanzania	38:57
108	Mykola Novytskyy	Ukraine	38:59
109	Oscar Cortínez	Argentina	39:03
110	Scott Simpson	Canada	39:05
111	John Burke	Ireland	39:06
112	Yevgeniy Medvednikov	Kazakhstan	39:12
113	Andrey Chigidinov	Kazakhstan	39:20
114	Paul Sumawe	Tanzania	39:21
115	Miguel Melendez	Chile	39:25
116	Arturo Malaquias	Mexico	39:31
117	Julián Peralta	Argentina	39:33
118	Jerry van den Eede	Belgium	39:37
119	Carlos Jaramillo	Chile	39:38
120	James Finlayson	Canada	40:08
121	Frédéric Collignon	Belgium	40:10
122	Jonathan Monje	Chile	40:13
123	Martin McCarthy	Ireland	40:22
124	Arkadiy Tolstyn	Kyrgyzstan	40:36
125	Sujeewa Chandrapala	Sri Lanka	40:39
126	Yohannes Ghirmai	Eritrea	40:56
127	Ajit Bandara	Sri Lanka	40:58
128	Khasan Rakhimov	Uzbekistan	41:45
129	Daniel Herrera	Chile	42:24
130	Vasiliy Medvedev	Uzbekistan	43:58
131	Leonard Ntala Meso	DR Congo	45:16
132	Radik Khubbiev	Uzbekistan	46:18
133	Abduvahob Nizamov	Uzbekistan	46:27
—	Sergiy Lebid	Ukraine	DNF
—	Mohammed Mourhit	Belgium	DNF
—	Antonio Silio	Argentina	DNF
—	Giuliano Battocletti	Italy	DNF
—	Hakim Radouan	Morocco	DNF
—	Matt Downin	United States	DNF
—	Goran Stojiljković	Yugoslavia	DNF
—	Hamid El Mouaziz	Morocco	DQ^{†}
—	Arthur Santiago	Angola	DNS
—	Juan José Cruz	Argentina	DNS
—	Vital Gahungu	Burundi	DNS
—	Mohammed S.M. Albayed	Palestine	DNS
—	Nader Almassri	Palestine	DNS
—	Ihab Salama Abdellah	Palestine	DNS
—	Paulo Guerra	Portugal	DNS
—	Joseph Kamara	Sierra Leone	DNS
—	Abubakar Timbo	Sierra Leone	DNS
—	Sergey Zabavski	Tajikistan	DNS

^{†}: Hamid El Mouaziz from Morocco finished 44th in 36:57 min, but was disqualified.

==== Teams ====
Rank	Team	Points
1st place, gold medalist(s)	Kenya: Wilberforce Talel / 3; Richard Limo / 4; Charles Kamathi / 5; Albert Chepkurui / 6; (Enock Mitei) / (n/s); (Hosea Kogo) / (n/s)	18
2nd place, silver medalist(s)	Ethiopia: Kenenisa Bekele / 1; Assefa Mezegebu / 11; Habte Jifar / 15; Fita Bayissa / 16; (Lemma Alemayehu) / (n/s); (Mesfin Hailu) / (n/s)	43
3rd place, bronze medalist(s)	Morocco: Abderrahim Goumri / 7; Jaouad Gharib / 9; Saïd Berrioui / 19; Elarbi Khattabi / 23; (Hakim Radouan) / (DNF)	58
4	France: Smail Sghir / 12; Mustapha Essaïd / 14; El Hassan Lahssini / 20; Mohamed Serbouti / 25; (Hassan El Ahmadi) / (n/s); (Khalid Zoubaa) / (n/s)	71
5	United States: Abdi Abdirahman / 10; Meb Keflezighi / 13; Dathan Ritzenhein / 21; Clint Wells / 63; (Greg Jimmerson) / (n/s); (Matt Downin) / (DNF)	107
6	Spain: José Manuel García / 22; José Manuel Martínez / 27; Teodoro Cuñado / 31; Iván Sánchez / 41; (José Carlos Adán) / (n/s); (José Rios) / (n/s)	121
7	Eritrea: Yonas Kifle / 8; Zersenay Tadesse / 24; Habtai Kifletsion / 50; Tesfayohannes Mesfen / 59; (Yohannes Ghirmai) / (n/s)	141
8	Tanzania: John Yuda / 2; Samson Ramadhani / 17; Daniel Andrew Sipe / 55; Julius Gidabuday / 72; (Paul Sumawe) / (n/s)	146
9	Portugal: Eduardo Henriques / 18; Alberto Maravilha / 38; Paulo Gomes / 44; Hélder Ornelas / 66; (Alberto Chaíça) / (n/s)	166
10	United Kingdom: Sam Haughian / 34; Allen Graffin / 40; Matt Smith / 46; Ian Hudspith / 53; (Glynn Tromans) / (n/s); (Matt O'Dowd) / (n/s)	173
11	Algeria: Samir Moussaoui / 32; Ahmed Naïli / 42; Mustapha Benacer / 45; Kamel Kohil / 56; (Abdelkrim Benzai) / (n/s); (Azzedine Sakhri) / (n/s)	175
12	Italy: Gabriele De Nard / 33; Rachid Berradi / 36; Umberto Pusterla / 48; Giovanni Gualdi / 64; (Gianni Crepaldi) / (n/s); (Giuliano Battocletti) / (DNF)	181
13	Japan: Makoto Otsu / 28; Tomonori Watanabe / 47; Shinichiro Okuda / 52; Kenjiro Jitsui / 57; (Yukihiro Motoda) / (n/s); (Yuki Yamamoto) / (n/s)	184
14	Australia: Dean Cavuoto / 29; Brett Cartwright / 37; Kim Gillard / 61; Sisay Bezabeh / 62; (Julian Dwyer) / (n/s)	189
15	Ireland: Peter Matthews / 35; Mark Carroll / 39; Seamus Power / 49; Fiachra Lombard / 67; (John Burke) / (n/s); (Martin McCarthy) / (n/s)	190
16	Rwanda: Dieudonné Disi / 43; Pacifique Ayabusa / 51; Rachid Safari / 60; Jean Bosco Ndagijimana / 65	219
17	Belgium: Tom van Hooste / 26; Koen van Rie / 54; Christian Nemeth / 69; Jerry van den Eede / 74; (Frédéric Collignon) / (n/s); (Mohammed Mourhit) / (DNF)	223
18	Chile: Mauricio Díaz / 30; Miguel Melendez / 73; Carlos Jaramillo / 75; Jonathan Monje / 76; (Daniel Herrera) / (n/s)	254
19	Canada: Brad Tighe / 58; Reid Coolsaet / 68; David Milne / 70; Alex Hutchinson / 71; (Scott Simpson) / (n/s); (James Finlayson) / (n/s)	267
20	Uzbekistan: Khasan Rakhimov / 77; Vasiliy Medvedev / 78; Radik Khubbiev / 79; Abduvahob Nizamov / 80	314
DNF	Argentina: José Alberto Montenegro / (n/s); Oscar Cortínez / (n/s); Julián Peralta / (n/s); Antonio Silio / (DNF)	DNF

- Note: Athletes in parentheses did not score for the team result (n/s: nonscorer)

== Participation ==
According to an unofficial count, 141 athletes from 37 countries participated in the Senior men's race. The announced athletes from Angola, Palestine, Sierra Leone, and Tajikistan did not show.

- Algeria (6)
- Argentina (4)
- Australia (5)
- Belgium (6)
- Burundi (3)
- Canada (6)
- Chile (5)
- DR Congo (1)
- Eritrea (5)
- Ethiopia (6)
- France (6)
- Ireland (6)
- Italy (6)
- Japan (6)
- Kazakhstan (2)
- Kenya (6)
- Kyrgyzstan (1)
- Lesotho (1)
- Mexico (2)
- Morocco (6)
- Netherlands (1)
- Portugal (5)
- Rwanda (4)
- Slovakia (1)
- South Africa (1)
- Spain (6)
- Sri Lanka (3)
- Eswatini (1)
- Sweden (1)
- Tanzania (5)
- Ukraine (3)
- United Kingdom (6)
- United States (6)
- Uzbekistan (4)
- Yugoslavia (1)
- Zambia (2)
- Zimbabwe (2)

== See also ==
- 2002 IAAF World Cross Country Championships – Men's short race
- 2002 IAAF World Cross Country Championships – Junior men's race
- 2002 IAAF World Cross Country Championships – Senior women's race
- 2002 IAAF World Cross Country Championships – Women's short race
- 2002 IAAF World Cross Country Championships – Junior women's race
