= 2002 IAAF World Cross Country Championships – Junior women's race =

Junior women's race at the 2002 IAAF World Cross Country Championships
- Organisers: IAAF
- Edition: 30th
- Date: March 23
- Host city: Dublin, Leinster, Ireland (Republic of Ireland)
- Venue: Leopardstown Racecourse
- Events: 1
- Distances: 5.962 km – Junior women
- Participation: 110 athletes from 31 nations

The Junior women's race at the 2002 IAAF World Cross Country Championships was held at the Leopardstown Racecourse near Dublin, Ireland, on March 23, 2002. Reports on the event were given in The New York Times, in the Herald, and for the IAAF.

Complete results for individuals, for teams, medallists, and the results of British athletes who took part were published.

== Race results ==
=== Junior women's race (5.962 km) ===
==== Individual ====
Rank	Athlete	Country	Time
1st place, gold medalist(s)	Viola Kibiwott	Kenya	20:13
2nd place, silver medalist(s)	Tirunesh Dibaba	Ethiopia	20:14
3rd place, bronze medalist(s)	Vivian Cheruiyot	Kenya	20:22
4	Fridah Domongole	Kenya	20:23
5	Peninah Chepchumba	Kenya	20:24
6	Bezunesh Bekele	Ethiopia	20:34
7	Mestawat Tufa	Ethiopia	20:40
8	Snezana Kostic	Yugoslavia	20:43
9	Melissa Rollison	Australia	20:50
10	Sharon Cherop	Kenya	20:53
11	Yenealem Ayano	Ethiopia	20:59
12	Valentine Koech	Kenya	21:03
13	Meseret Defar	Ethiopia	21:06
14	Emi Ikeda	Japan	21:16
15	Derbe Ayele	Ethiopia	21:18
16	Zubeda Gussi	Tanzania	21:20
17	Erika Odlaug	United States	21:23
18	Irvette van Blerk	South Africa	21:30
19	Farida Gusi	Tanzania	21:35
20	Joanna Wall	Australia	21:36
21	Chiaki Iwamoto	Japan	21:43
22	Galina Ignatyeva	Russia	21:44
23	Lemlem Bereket	Eritrea	21:49
24	Mika Matsumoto	Japan	21:50
25	Mariem Alaoui Selsouli	Morocco	21:50
26	Olga Minina	Belarus	21:52
27	Aleisha Anderson	Australia	21:56
28	Gwendoline Despres	France	21:59
29	Maria Cicero	United States	21:59
30	Adrienne Herzog	Netherlands	22:00
31	Charlotte Dale	United Kingdom	22:01
32	Ayumi Hashimoto	Japan	22:01
33	Galina Yegorova	Russia	22:03
34	Chantel Bartleman	South Africa	22:03
35	Anne Gauthier	France	22:03
36	Valerie Lauver	United States	22:06
37	Alba García	Spain	22:07
38	Amparo Menéndez	Spain	22:07
39	Marina Ivanova	Russia	22:07
40	Nicole Lee	United States	22:10
41	Nancy Frouin	France	22:11
42	Yuliya Stashkiv	Ukraine	22:11
43	Sara Bei	United States	22:12
44	Silvia La Barbera	Italy	22:14
45	Henrietta Freeman	United Kingdom	22:15
46	Faye Fullerton	United Kingdom	22:16
47	Kathryn Andersen	United States	22:16
48	Chahrazad Cheboub	Algeria	22:19
49	Misaki Katsumata	Japan	22:20
50	Simret Sultan	Eritrea	22:24
51	Clare McKechnie	Australia	22:26
52	Tatyana Petrova	Russia	22:26
53	Jessica Nugent	United Kingdom	22:27
54	Fatiha Bahi	Algeria	22:37
55	Isabel Macías	Spain	22:42
56	Nthatuda Semanama	Lesotho	22:44
57	Simret Asmerom	Eritrea	22:48
58	Lebogang Phalula	South Africa	22:52
59	Olga Kryvyak	Ukraine	22:53
60	Viktoriya Zuyeva	Russia	22:54
61	Sharon Tavengwa	Zimbabwe	22:58
62	Noura Cheffara	Algeria	23:00
63	Freya Murray	United Kingdom	23:01
64	María Elena Valencia	Mexico	23:03
65	Rosemary Grosso	Italy	23:05
66	Asmara Gebrezghi	Eritrea	23:07
67	Yuliya Ruban	Ukraine	23:09
68	Lisa Dobriskey	United Kingdom	23:10
69	Maria Carbo	Spain	23:15
70	Eleonora Riga	Italy	23:19
71	Sónia Fernandes	Portugal	23:20
72	Fionnuala Britton	Ireland	23:21
73	Elodie Mené	France	23:22
74	Saloua Hassani	Algeria	23:22
75	Seham El Agizy	Egypt	23:22
76	Evelien Hofmans	Belgium	23:27
77	Anastasiya Pustarnakova	Belarus	23:30
78	Erica Lombardi	Italy	23:31
79	Fadhila Cheffara	Algeria	23:32
80	Belén Iñigo	Spain	23:33
81	Tetyana Filonyuk	Ukraine	23:35
82	Mélanie Veron	France	23:40
83	Lindsay Laltoo	Canada	23:41
84	Chanelle Olivier	South Africa	23:49
85	Kirsten Braem	Belgium	23:57
86	Caitlin Malone	Canada	23:59
87	Linda Byrne	Ireland	24:15
88	Miek Vyncke	Belgium	24:17
89	Michelle Gallagher	Ireland	24:21
90	Estela Alhambra	Spain	24:24
91	Natalie Rogers	Canada	24:27
92	Sara Abou Hassan	Egypt	24:28
93	Yyldyz Durdiyeva	Turkmenistan	24:31
94	Alyson Kohlmeier	Canada	24:39
95	Ana Rosa Fuentes	Mexico	24:46
96	Marijke Jacobs	Belgium	24:47
97	Jessica Crate	Canada	24:52
98	Irina Moroz	Uzbekistan	25:02
99	Kristina Medyanskaya	Uzbekistan	25:05
100	Lisa Coohill	Ireland	25:26
101	Ava Hutchinson	Ireland	25:35
102	Anna Sidorova	Uzbekistan	25:39
103	Veronika Kirgizbayeva	Uzbekistan	25:41
104	Anke van Campen	Belgium	25:49
105	Ashling Baker	Ireland	25:53
106	Sharon Soussi	Gibraltar	27:44
107	Shakeina Bush	Cayman Islands	32:26
108	Christel Arnold	South Africa	33:07
—	Samira Afettouche	Algeria	DNF
—	Manuela Fadda	Italy	DNF
—	Amanda Kohlmeier	Canada	DNS
—	Kazue Awai	Japan	DNS

==== Teams ====
Rank	Team	Points
1st place, gold medalist(s)	Kenya: Viola Kibiwott / 1; Vivian Cheruiyot / 3; Fridah Domongole / 4; Peninah Chepchumba / 5; (Sharon Cherop) / (n/s); (Valentine Koech) / (n/s)	13
2nd place, silver medalist(s)	Ethiopia: Tirunesh Dibaba / 2; Bezunesh Bekele / 6; Mestawat Tufa / 7; Yenealem Ayano / 9; (Meseret Defar) / (n/s); (Derbe Ayele) / (n/s)	24
3rd place, bronze medalist(s)	Japan: Emi Ikeda / 10; Chiaki Iwamoto / 14; Mika Matsumoto / 17; Ayumi Hashimoto / 22; (Misaki Katsumata) / (n/s)	63
4	Australia: Melissa Rollison / 8; Joanna Wall / 13; Aleisha Anderson / 18; Clare McKechnie / 38	77
5	United States: Erika Odlaug / 11; Maria Cicero / 20; Valerie Lauver / 26; Nicole Lee / 30; (Sara Bei) / (n/s); (Kathryn Andersen) / (n/s)	87
6	Russia: Galina Ignatyeva / 15; Galina Yegorova / 23; Marina Ivanova / 29; Tatyana Petrova / 39; (Viktoriya Zuyeva) / (n/s)	106
7	France: Gwendoline Despres / 19; Anne Gauthier / 25; Nancy Frouin / 31; Elodie Mené / 53; (Mélanie Veron) / (n/s)	128
8	United Kingdom: Charlotte Dale / 21; Henrietta Freeman / 34; Faye Fullerton / 35; Jessica Nugent / 40; (Freya Murray) / (n/s); (Lisa Dobriskey) / (n/s)	130
9	South Africa: Irvette van Blerk / 12; Chantel Bartleman / 24; Lebogang Phalula / 44; Chanelle Olivier / 59; (Christel Arnold) / (n/s)	139
10	Eritrea: Lemlem Bereket / 16; Simret Sultan / 37; Simret Asmerom / 43; Asmara Gebrezghi / 48	144
11	Spain: Alba García / 27; Amparo Menéndez / 28; Isabel Macías / 42; Maria Carbo / 50; (Belén Iñigo) / (n/s); (Estela Alhambra) / (n/s)	147
12	Algeria: Chahrazad Cheboub / 36; Fatiha Bahi / 41; Noura Cheffara / 46; Saloua Hassani / 54; (Fadhila Cheffara) / (n/s); (Samira Afettouche) / (DNF)	177
13	Ukraine: Yuliya Stashkiv / 32; Olga Kryvyak / 45; Yuliya Ruban / 49; Tetyana Filonyuk / 57	183
14	Italy: Silvia La Barbera / 33; Rosemary Grosso / 47; Eleonora Riga / 51; Erica Lombardi / 56; (Manuela Fadda) / (DNF)	187
15	Belgium: Evelien Hofmans / 55; Kirsten Braem / 60; Miek Vyncke / 63; Marijke Jacobs / 67; (Anke van Campen) / (n/s)	245
16	Ireland: Fionnuala Britton / 52; Linda Byrne / 62; Michelle Gallagher / 64; Lisa Coohill / 70; (Ava Hutchinson) / (n/s); (Ashling Baker) / (n/s)	248
17	Canada: Lindsay Laltoo / 58; Caitlin Malone / 61; Natalie Rogers / 65; Alyson Kohlmeier / 66; (Jessica Crate) / (n/s)	250
18	Uzbekistan: Irina Moroz / 68; Kristina Medyanskaya / 69; Anna Sidorova / 71; Veronika Kirgizbayeva / 72	280

- Note: Athletes in parentheses did not score for the team result (n/s: nonscorer)

== Participation ==
According to an unofficial count, 110 athletes from 31 countries participated in the Junior women's race. This is in agreement with the official numbers as published.

- Algeria (6)
- Australia (4)
- Belarus (2)
- Belgium (5)
- Canada (5)
- Cayman Islands (1)
- Egypt (2)
- Eritrea (4)
- Ethiopia (6)
- France (5)
- Gibraltar (1)
- Ireland (6)
- Italy (5)
- Japan (5)
- Kenya (6)
- Lesotho (1)
- Mexico (2)
- Morocco (1)
- Netherlands (1)
- Portugal (1)
- Russia (5)
- South Africa (5)
- Spain (6)
- Tanzania (2)
- Turkmenistan (1)
- Ukraine (4)
- United Kingdom (6)
- United States (6)
- Uzbekistan (4)
- Yugoslavia (1)
- Zimbabwe (1)

== See also ==
- 2002 IAAF World Cross Country Championships – Senior men's race
- 2002 IAAF World Cross Country Championships – Men's short race
- 2002 IAAF World Cross Country Championships – Junior men's race
- 2002 IAAF World Cross Country Championships – Senior women's race
- 2002 IAAF World Cross Country Championships – Women's short race
