= Monia Capelli =

Italian long-distance runner

Personal information
- National team: Italy (2 caps in 2002)
- Born: 15 December 1969 (age 56) Vittorio Veneto, Italy

Sport
- Country: Italy
- Sport: Athletics
- Events: Long-distance running; Cross country running

Achievements and titles
- Personal best: Half marathon: 1:13:37 (1999)

Monia Capelli (born 15 December 1969) is a former Italian female long-distance runner who competed at individual senior level at the IAAF World Half Marathon Championships and at the IAAF World Cross Country Championships (2002).
