= Mark Kenneally =

Irish marathon runner

Mark Kenneally P.Grad.Dip.
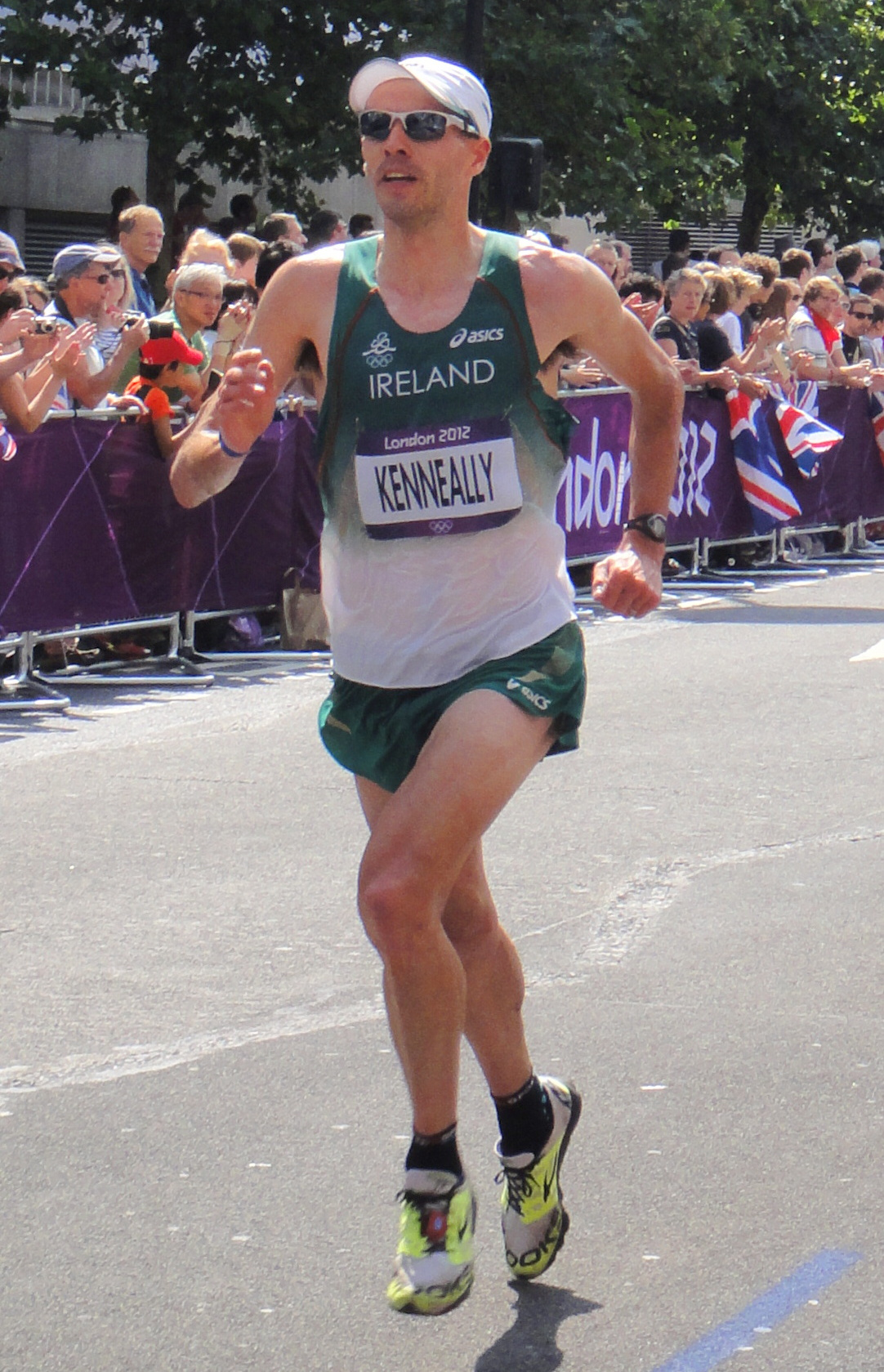
- Kenneally in the marathon at the 2012 Olympics in London

Personal information
- Born: April 18, 1981 (age 44)
- Height: 1.93 m (6 ft 4 in)
- Weight: 76 kg (168 lb)

Sport
- Country: Ireland
- Sport: Athletics
- Event: Marathon

Mark Kenneally (born 18 April 1981) in Celbridge is an Irish Marathon runner. He competed at the 2012 Olympic Games in the Men's marathon where he finished in 57th position.

In 2015 he and Ger O'Brien started a football coaching consultancy, Elite Performance Consultancy. In January 2017, both Kenneally and O'Brien started working directly for professional football club St Patrick's Athletic of the League of Ireland Premier Division, where Kenneally was made Strength and Conditioning Coach.
