= Nancy Wambui =

Kenyan long-distance runner (born 1986)

Nancy Wambūi (born 28 July 1986) is a Kenyan long-distance runner.

At the 2002 World Cross Country Championships she finished thirteenth in the short race, while the Kenyan team of which Wambūi was a part finished second in the team competition. She then finished fourteenth at the 2006 World Cross Country Championships, but that was not enough to win a medal with the team.

== Personal bests ==
- 5000 metres - 15:22.0 min (2001)
