= Eoin Higgins =

Northern Ireland judge (1927–1993)

Sir John Patrick Basil Higgins, known as Sir Eoin Higgins (14 June 1927 – 2 September 1993), was a judge of the High Court of Northern Ireland. He was knighted in 1988.

Born at Town Parks, Magherafelt, County Londonderry and described as a "devout Roman Catholic", he studied at St Columb's College and at Queen's University Belfast. In 1948 he was called to the Bar and in 1967 became Queen's Counsel, having served in the county courts of Armagh, Fermanagh and Antrim. He was first named to a judgeship in 1971.

In 1982 he became Recorder of Belfast. He became a judge of the High Court of Northern Ireland in 1984 and was in charge of the Family Division. He was a frequent target of assassination attempts by the Irish Republican Army ever since his first judgeship in 1971 on a lower court.

The Times reported that "he was on almost every hit list they compiled, despite (or because of) his Irish nationalism." Higgins "wanted Ireland and Northern Ireland to become united, but only through peaceful methods."

In 1989, he tried loyalist paramilitary Michael Stone, who had killed three Catholics, including one Provisional I.R.A. member, Kevin Brady, attending an outdoor funeral service for three Provisional I.R.A. members. He sentenced Stone to life imprisonment with a recommendation that Stone serve at least thirty years, calling him a "dangerous and ruthless criminal."

== Death ==
Sir Eoin Higgins died on 2 September 1993, aged 66, of an aneurysm in Belfast, where he resided. He had been due to be sworn in as a Lord Justice of Appeal of Northern Ireland the following day.
