= Julius Nyamu =

Kenyan middle-distance runner

Julius Nyamu (born 1 December 1977) is a Kenyan middle-distance runner who specializes in the 3000 metres steeplechase.

His personal best time is 8:07.59 minutes, achieved in August 2004 in Brussels.

== Achievements ==
Year	Competition	Venue	Position	Notes
2002	World Cross Country Championships	Dublin, Ireland	6th	Short race
	World Cross Country Championships	Dublin, Ireland	1st	Team competition
2003	World Athletics Final	Monte Carlo, Monaco	4th	3000 m st.
2004	World Athletics Final	Monte Carlo, Monaco	8th	3000 m st.
