= Irina Matrosova =

Uzbekistani long-distance runner

Personal information
- Born: 5 April 1962 (age 63)

Sport
- Country: Uzbekistan
- Sport: Long-distance running

Irina Matrosova (born 5 April 1962) is an Uzbekistani long-distance runner. In 2001, she competed in the women's marathon at the 2001 World Championships in Athletics held in Edmonton, Alberta, Canada. She did not finish her race.
