= Rosanna Martin =

Italian cross-country runner

Personal information
- National team: Italy
- Born: 27 July 1973 (age 52) Monselice, Italy

Sport
- Sport: Athletics
- Events: Middle-distance running; Cross country running

Rosanna Martin (born 27 July 1973) is an Italian runner who specialized in cross-country running.

== Achievements ==
Year	Tournament	Venue	Result	Extra
1999	World Cross Country Championships	Belfast, Northern Ireland	26th	Long race
1999	World Cross Country Championships	Belfast, Northern Ireland	10th	Team competition
2001	World Cross Country Championships	Ostend, Belgium	26th	Long race
2001	World Cross Country Championships	Ostend, Belgium	6th	Team competition
2002	World Cross Country Championships	Dublin, Ireland	9th	Short race
2002	World Cross Country Championships	Dublin, Ireland	13th	Team competition
2002	World Cross Country Championships	Dublin, Ireland	17th	Long race
2002	World Cross Country Championships	Dublin, Ireland	9th	Team competition
2003	World Cross Country Championships	Lausanne, Switzerland	27th	Short race
2003	World Cross Country Championships	Lausanne, Switzerland	10th	Team competition
