= Luke Kipkosgei =

Kenyan long-distance runner

Medal record

Men's athletics

Representing Kenya

World Indoor Championships
Bronze medal – third place	2003 Birmingham	3000 m

World Cross Country Championships
Silver medal – second place	2002 Dublin	Short race

Luke Kipkosgei (born 27 November 1975 in Iten) is a Kenyan long-distance runner who is most known for his track running over 3000 metres and 5000 metres.

His first major medals came in 1998: he took the 5000 metres gold medal at the 1998 Goodwill Games and then a silver medal behind Haile Gebrselassie over 3000 m at the 1998 IAAF Grand Prix Final. Two years later at the 2000 IAAF Grand Prix Final, he won the gold in the event. A silver medal over 5000 m at the 2001 Goodwill Games was followed by a bronze at the 2001 IAAF Grand Prix Final. He is a four-time winner of the Zatopek 10,000 metres race in Australia and holds the current race record of 27:22.54, set in 1998.

He has also competed in cross country running and won the Cross Internacional Valle de Llodio in 1998 and the Cross de l'Acier in 2000. He was the silver medallist in the short race at the 2002 IAAF World Cross Country Championships, finishing behind Kenenisa Bekele but helping Kenya to the team gold. He won his first global track medal at the 2003 IAAF World Indoor Championships, taking the bronze medal over 3000 m.

He later switched to road running and took 10K wins at the Cooper River Bridge Run in 2004 and the Azalea Trail Run in 2005. He made his debut over the marathon distance at the 2010 Antwerp Marathon and recorded a time of 2:14:37 for second place.

In December 2010 Luke was invited back to Melbourne as part of the 50th Anniversary celebrations of the Zatopek:10. Luke decided to also race the 10000m track event, placing 5th behind Josphat Menjo in 28:47. Despite being the fastest 10000m runner of 2010, Menjo was unable to break Luke's race record, winning in a time of 27:39.80.

He trains with Kimbia Athletics and is coached by Dieter Hogen.

== Achievements ==
Year	Competition	Venue	Position	Event	Notes
Representing Kenya
1998	Goodwill Games	Uniondale, United States	1st	5000 m	
2001	Goodwill Games	Brisbane, Australia	2nd	5000 m	
2002	World Cross Country Championships	Dublin, Ireland	2nd	Short race	Individual
2002	World Cross Country Championships	Dublin, Ireland	1st	Short race	Team
2003	World Indoor Championships	Birmingham, England	3rd	3000 m	
2003	World Athletics Final	Monte Carlo, Monaco	7th	3000 m	
2004	World Athletics Final	Monte Carlo, Monaco	10th	3000 m	

=== Personal bests ===
- 1500 metres - 3:35.48 min (1998)
- 3000 metres - 7:27.59 min (1998)
- 5000 metres - 12:56.50 min (2000)
- 10,000 metres - 27:12.37 min (2001)
- Half marathon - 1:01:18 (2007)
- Marathon - 2:14:37 (2010)
