= 2001 IAAF World Cross Country Championships – Senior men's race =

Senior men's race at the 2001 IAAF World Cross Country Championships
- Organisers: IAAF
- Edition: 29th
- Date: March 25
- Host city: Ostend, West Flanders, Belgium
- Venue: Hippodrome Wellington
- Events: 1
- Distances: 12.3 km – Senior men
- Participation: 169 athletes from 47 nations

The Senior men's race at the 2001 IAAF World Cross Country Championships was held at the Hippodrome Wellington in Ostend (Oostende), Belgium, on March 25, 2001. Reports of the event were given in The New York Times, in the Herald, and for the IAAF.

Complete results for individuals, for teams, medallists, and the results of British athletes who took part were published.

== Race results ==
=== Senior men's race (12.3 km) ===
==== Individual ====
Rank	Athlete	Country	Time
1st place, gold medalist(s)	Mohammed Mourhit	Belgium	39:53
2nd place, silver medalist(s)	Sergiy Lebid	Ukraine	40:03
3rd place, bronze medalist(s)	Charles Kamathi	Kenya	40:05
4	Paulo Guerra	Portugal	40:06
5	Paul Kosgei	Kenya	40:09
6	Driss El Himer	France	40:13
7	Patrick Ivuti	Kenya	40:16
8	Hélder Ornelas	Portugal	40:33
9	Alejandro Gómez	Spain	40:37
10	Róbert Štefko	Slovakia	40:41
11	Mustafa El Ahmadi	France	40:42
12	Bob Kennedy	United States	40:43
13	Meb Keflezighi	United States	40:46
14	Yibeltal Admassu	Ethiopia	40:49
15	Abdi Abdirahman	United States	40:54
16	Alberto García	Spain	40:57
17	Giuliano Battocletti	Italy	40:59
18	Enock Mitei	Kenya	41:01
19	Michele Gamba	Italy	41:01
20	Tom van Hooste	Belgium	41:02
21	Habte Jifar	Ethiopia	41:04
22	Peter Matthews	Ireland	41:04
23	Obed Mutanya	Zambia	41:07
24	Keith Kelly	Ireland	41:15
25	Lee Troop	Australia	41:18
26	Lyes Ramoul	France	41:21
27	John Yuda	Tanzania	41:22
28	John Cheruiyot Korir	Kenya	41:25
29	Mikaël Thomas	France	41:27
30	Gabriele De Nard	Italy	41:29
31	Mauricio Díaz	Chile	41:30
32	Richard Limo	Kenya	41:31
33	Claes Nyberg	Sweden	41:32
34	Simon Mpholo	South Africa	41:33
35	José Rios	Spain	41:36
36	Sergey Lukin	Russia	41:37
37	Maurizio Leone	Italy	41:38
38	Karl Keska	United Kingdom	41:38
39	Samir Moussaoui	Algeria	41:38
40	Alberto Juzdado	Spain	41:39
41	Steve Moneghetti	Australia	41:39
42	Yonas Kifle	Eritrea	41:44
43	Domingos Castro	Portugal	41:49
44	Seamus Power	Ireland	41:54
45	Paulo Gomes	Portugal	41:56
46	Ahmed Naïli	Algeria	41:59
47	Nick Rogers	United States	41:59
48	Dominic Bannister	United Kingdom	42:02
49	Zebedayo Bayo	Tanzania	42:06
50	José Carlos Adán	Spain	42:08
51	Gabalebe Moloko	Botswana	42:13
52	Greg Jimmerson	United States	42:14
53	Kheireddine Hamsi	Algeria	42:15
54	Alberto Maravilha	Portugal	42:17
55	Jerry van den Eede	Belgium	42:20
56	Vinny Mulvey	Ireland	42:21
57	Elenilson da Silva	Brazil	42:26
58	Manuel Pacheco	Portugal	42:28
59	Michael Aish	New Zealand	42:29
60	Yoji Yamaguchi	Japan	42:30
61	Glynn Tromans	United Kingdom	42:33
62	Abdelkrim Benzai	Algeria	42:34
63	Ruddy Walem	Belgium	42:36
64	John Nada Saya	Tanzania	42:37
65	Matt O'Dowd	United Kingdom	42:37
66	Michael Sarwath	Tanzania	42:38
67	Demissie Girma	Ethiopia	42:38
68	Tegenu Abebe	Ethiopia	42:39
69	Knut Erik Rame	Norway	42:42
70	Miloud Kalloud	Algeria	42:54
71	Brett Cartwright	Australia	42:55
72	Mohamed Serbouti	France	43:05
73	Sisay Bezabeh	Australia	43:08
74	Koen van Rie	Belgium	43:10
75	Graham Cocksedge	Canada	43:12
76	Medison Chibwe	Zambia	43:12
77	Vital Gahungu	Burundi	43:13
78	Vincent Hatuleke	Zambia	43:19
79	Marc Vanderstraeten	Belgium	43:21
80	Matt Downin	United States	43:21
81	Kenichiro Setoguchi	Japan	43:23
82	Lambert Ndayikeza	Burundi	43:28
83	Pasteur Nyabenda	Burundi	43:28
84	Joseph Simuchimba	Zambia	43:32
85	Nobuya Matsunaga	Japan	43:34
86	Jonathan Monje	Chile	43:40
87	Carlos Jaramillo	Chile	43:41
88	Larbi Zéroual	France	43:41
89	Daisuke Arakawa	Japan	43:42
90	Wirimai Juwawo	Zimbabwe	43:43
91	Ahmed Abd El Mangoud	Egypt	43:52
92	Adilson Ribeiro	Brazil	43:53
93	Noel Berkeley	Ireland	43:56
94	Matt Smith	United Kingdom	43:58
95	Peter Cardle	Canada	43:59
96	Hugo Romero	Mexico	44:00
97	Cristian Hidalgo	Chile	44:00
98	Marco Mazza	Italy	44:01
99	Kabo Gabaseme	Botswana	44:14
100	Onèsphore Nkunzimana	Burundi	44:15
101	Keenetse Moswasi	Botswana	44:27
102	Cathal Lombard	Ireland	44:30
103	Alex Hutchinson	Canada	44:39
104	James Finlayson	Canada	44:48
105	Mark Bomba	Canada	44:49
106	Fabián Roncero	Spain	44:53
107	Hamdi Kamel	Egypt	44:56
108	Adamou Aboubakar	Cameroon	45:05
109	Sergey Sabaleyskiy	Belarus	45:07
110	Molatelela Bosupeng	Botswana	45:07
111	Tau Khotso	Lesotho	45:09
112	José Alberto Montenegro	Argentina	45:09
113	Daniel Gidombada	Tanzania	45:12
114	Raúl Mora	Chile	45:14
115	Aman Saini	India	45:20
116	Andy Hahn	Canada	45:22
117	Fouly Salem	Egypt	45:25
118	Siphesihle Mdluli	Eswatini	45:26
119	Wellington Fraga	Brazil	45:32
120	Wael Anwar	Egypt	45:35
121	Leonid Berasnyov	Belarus	45:37
122	Isaac Gómez	Mexico	45:40
123	Dragoslav Prpa	Yugoslavia	45:48
124	Josep Sansa	Andorra	45:51
125	Thuso Dihoro	Botswana	45:51
126	Rafael Muñoz	Mexico	45:55
127	Sipho Dlamini	Eswatini	46:03
128	Djamched Rasulov	Tajikistan	46:05
129	Perica Brkic	Croatia	46:07
130	Tesfit Berhe	Eritrea	46:13
131	Vladimir Tonchinskiy	Belarus	46:17
132	Jean-Paul Niyonsaba	Burundi	46:21
133	Bhaskar Bhosale	India	46:21
134	Kaupo Tiislär	Estonia	46:25
135	Mikhail Kanchak	Belarus	46:30
136	Arkadiy Tolstyn	Kyrgyzstan	46:34
137	Sergey Zabavskiy	Tajikistan	46:41
138	Vasiliy Medvedev	Uzbekistan	46:46
139	Jaanus Gross	Estonia	46:49
140	Luke Madongo	Eswatini	46:51
141	Ahmed Salman	Egypt	46:53
142	Sokhibdjan Sharipov	Tajikistan	46:53
143	Leonardo da Silva	Brazil	46:57
144	Bakhodur Boimuradov	Tajikistan	47:00
145	Anil Kumar	India	47:02
146	Bhekumusa Simelane	Eswatini	47:07
147	Farag Abdelnaby	Egypt	47:38
148	Mathieu Kouanotso	Cameroon	47:53
149	Parakhat Kurtgeldiyev	Turkmenistan	47:53
150	Ihab Salama	Palestine	47:54
151	Vasiliy Andreyev	Uzbekistan	48:18
152	Charygeldiy Allaberdiyev	Turkmenistan	48:50
153	Sopy Ashyrov	Turkmenistan	48:52
154	Chokirjon Irmatov	Tajikistan	49:04
155	Agzam Aliyev	Uzbekistan	49:25
156	Bhairav Singh	India	49:53
157	Abduvahob Nizamov	Uzbekistan	50:05
158	Hoi To Ho	Hong Kong	50:29
159	Dovletmomed Nazarov	Turkmenistan	51:28
—	Keith Cullen	United Kingdom	DNF
—	Antonio Silio	Argentina	DNF
—	Oscar Cortínez	Argentina	DNF
—	Mostafa Errebbah	Italy	DNF
—	Mohamed Driouche	Algeria	DNF
—	Fabián Campanini	Argentina	DNF
—	Javier Carriqueo	Argentina	DNF
—	José Mansilla	Argentina	DNF
—	Isidore Nizigiyimana	Burundi	DNF
—	Dejene Berhanu	Ethiopia	DNF
—	Sergio López	Chile	DNS
—	Monday Danjuma	Nigeria	DNS
—	Gideon Hagack	Nigeria	DNS
—	Ahmed Saeed Hassan	Somalia	DNS
—	Phaustin Baha Sulle	Tanzania	DNS

==== Teams ====
Rank	Team	Points
1st place, gold medalist(s)	Kenya: Charles Kamathi / 3; Paul Kosgei / 5; Patrick Ivuti / 7; Enock Mitei / 18; (John Cheruiyot Korir) / (28); (Richard Limo) / (32)	33
2nd place, silver medalist(s)	France: Driss El Himer / 6; Mustafa El Ahmadi / 11; Lyes Ramoul / 26; Mikaël Thomas / 29; (Mohamed Serbouti) / (72); (Larbi Zéroual) / (88)	72
3rd place, bronze medalist(s)	United States: Bob Kennedy / 12; Meb Keflezighi / 13; Abdi Abdirahman / 15; Nick Rogers / 47; (Greg Jimmerson) / (52); (Matt Downin) / (80)	87
4	Spain: Alejandro Gómez / 9; Alberto García / 16; José Rios / 35; Alberto Juzdado / 40; (José Carlos Adán) / (50); (Fabián Roncero) / (106)	100
5	Portugal: Paulo Guerra / 4; Hélder Ornelas / 8; Domingos Castro / 43; Paulo Gomes / 45; (Alberto Maravilha) / (54); (Manuel Pacheco) / (58)	100
6	Italy: Giuliano Battocletti / 17; Michele Gamba / 19; Gabriele De Nard / 30; Maurizio Leone / 37; (Marco Mazza) / (98); (Mostafa Errebbah) / (DNF)	103
7	Belgium: Mohammed Mourhit / 1; Tom van Hooste / 20; Jerry van den Eede / 55; Ruddy Walem / 63; (Koen van Rie) / (74); (Marc Vanderstraeten) / (79)	139
8	Ireland: Peter Matthews / 22; Keith Kelly / 24; Seamus Power / 44; Vinny Mulvey / 56; (Noel Berkeley) / (93); (Cathal Lombard) / (102)	146
9	Ethiopia: Yibeltal Admassu / 14; Habte Jifar / 21; Demissie Girma / 67; Tegenu Abebe / 68; (Dejene Berhanu) / (DNF)	170
10	Algeria: Samir Moussaoui / 39; Ahmed Naïli / 46; Kheireddine Hamsi / 53; Abdelkrim Benzai / 62; (Miloud Kalloud) / (70); (Mohamed Driouche) / (DNF)	200
11	Tanzania: John Yuda / 27; Zebedayo Bayo / 49; John Nada Saya / 64; Michael Sarwath / 66; (Daniel Gidombada) / (113)	206
12	Australia: Lee Troop / 25; Steve Moneghetti / 41; Brett Cartwright / 71; Sisay Bezabeh / 73	210
13	United Kingdom: Karl Keska / 38; Dominic Bannister / 48; Glynn Tromans / 61; Matt O'Dowd / 65; (Matt Smith) / (94); (Keith Cullen) / (DNF)	212
14	Zambia: Obed Mutanya / 23; Medison Chibwe / 76; Vincent Hatuleke / 78; Joseph Simuchimba / 84	261
15	Chile: Mauricio Díaz / 31; Jonathan Monje / 86; Carlos Jaramillo / 87; Cristian Hidalgo / 97; (Raúl Mora) / (114)	301
16	Japan: Yoji Yamaguchi / 60; Kenichiro Setoguchi / 81; Nobuya Matsunaga / 85; Daisuke Arakawa / 89	315
17	Burundi: Vital Gahungu / 77; Lambert Ndayikeza / 82; Pasteur Nyabenda / 83; Onèsphore Nkunzimana / 100; (Jean-Paul Niyonsaba) / (132); (Isidore Nizigiyimana) / (DNF)	342
18	Botswana: Gabalebe Moloko / 51; Kabo Gabaseme / 99; Keenetse Moswasi / 101; Molatelela Bosupeng / 110; (Thuso Dihoro) / (125)	361
19	Canada: Graham Cocksedge / 75; Peter Cardle / 95; Alex Hutchinson / 103; James Finlayson / 104; (Mark Bomba) / (105); (Andy Hahn) / (116)	377
20	Brazil: Elenilson da Silva / 57; Adilson Ribeiro / 92; Wellington Fraga / 119; Leonardo da Silva / 143	411
21	Egypt: Ahmed Abd El Mangoud / 91; Hamdi Kamel / 107; Fouly Salem / 117; Wael Anwar / 120; (Ahmed Salman) / (141); (Farag Abdelnaby) / (147)	435
22	Belarus: Sergey Sabaleyskiy / 109; Leonid Berasnyov / 121; Vladimir Tonchinskiy / 131; Mikhail Kanchak / 135	496
23	Eswatini: Siphesihle Mdluli / 118; Sipho Dlamini / 127; Luke Madongo / 140; Bhekumusa Simelane / 146	531
24	India: Aman Saini / 115; Bhaskar Bhosale / 133; Anil Kumar / 145; Bhairav Singh / 156	549
25	Tajikistan: Djamched Rasulov / 128; Sergey Zabavskiy / 137; Sokhibdjan Sharipov / 142; Bakhodur Boimuradov / 144; (Chokirjon Irmatov) / (154)	551
26	Uzbekistan: Vasiliy Medvedev / 138; Vasiliy Andreyev / 151; Agzam Aliyev / 155; Abduvahob Nizamov / 157	601
27	Turkmenistan: Parakhat Kurtgeldiyev / 149; Charygeldiy Allaberdiyev / 152; Sopy Ashyrov / 153; Dovletmomed Nazarov / 159	613
DNF	Argentina: (José Alberto Montenegro) / (112); (Antonio Silio) / (DNF); (Oscar Cortínez) / (DNF); (Fabián Campanini) / (DNF); (Javier Carriqueo) / (DNF); (José Mansilla) / (DNF)	DNF

- Note: Athletes in parentheses did not score for the team result

== Participation ==
An unofficial count yields the participation of 169 athletes from 47 countries in the Senior men's race. The announced athletes from Nigeria and Somalia did not show.

- Algeria (6)
- Andorra (1)
- Argentina (6)
- Australia (4)
- Belarus (4)
- Belgium (6)
- Botswana (5)
- Brazil (4)
- Burundi (6)
- Cameroon (2)
- Canada (6)
- Chile (5)
- Croatia (1)
- Egypt (6)
- Eritrea (2)
- Estonia (2)
- Ethiopia (5)
- France (6)
- Hong Kong (1)
- India (4)
- Ireland (6)
- Italy (6)
- Japan (4)
- Kenya (6)
- Kyrgyzstan (1)
- Lesotho (1)
- Mexico (3)
- New Zealand (1)
- Norway (1)
- Palestine (1)
- Portugal (6)
- Russia (1)
- Slovakia (1)
- South Africa (1)
- Spain (6)
- Eswatini (4)
- Sweden (1)
- Tajikistan (5)
- Tanzania (5)
- Turkmenistan (4)
- Ukraine (1)
- United Kingdom (6)
- United States (6)
- Uzbekistan (4)
- Yugoslavia (1)
- Zambia (4)
- Zimbabwe (1)

== See also ==
- 2001 IAAF World Cross Country Championships – Men's short race
- 2001 IAAF World Cross Country Championships – Junior men's race
- 2001 IAAF World Cross Country Championships – Senior women's race
- 2001 IAAF World Cross Country Championships – Women's short race
- 2001 IAAF World Cross Country Championships – Junior women's race
