= 2001 IAAF World Cross Country Championships – Men's short race =

Men's short race at the 2001 IAAF World Cross Country Championships
- Organisers: IAAF
- Edition: 29th
- Date: March 24
- Host city: Ostend, West Flanders, Belgium
- Venue: Hippodrome Wellington
- Events: 1
- Distances: 4.1 km – Men's short
- Participation: 157 athletes from 47 nations

The Men's short race at the 2001 IAAF World Cross Country Championships was held at the Hippodrome Wellington in Ostend (Oostende), Belgium, on March 24, 2001. Reports of the event were given in The New York Times, in the Herald, and for the IAAF.

Complete results for individuals, for teams, medallists, and the results of British athletes who took part were published.

== Race results ==
=== Men's short race (4.1 km) ===
==== Individual ====
Rank	Athlete	Country	Time
1st place, gold medalist(s)	Enock Koech	Kenya	12:40
2nd place, silver medalist(s)	Kenenisa Bekele	Ethiopia	12:42
3rd place, bronze medalist(s)	Benjamin Limo	Kenya	12:43
4	Sammy Kipketer	Kenya	12:44
5	Cyrus Kataron	Kenya	12:45
6	Albert Chepkurui	Kenya	12:46
7	John Kibowen	Kenya	12:49
8	Craig Mottram	Australia	12:49
9	Brahim Boulami	Morocco	13:00
10	Haylu Mekonnen	Ethiopia	13:03
11	Adil Kaouch	Morocco	13:06
12	Saïd El Wardi	Morocco	13:08
13	Dagne Alemu	Ethiopia	13:08
14	John Yuda	Tanzania	13:09
15	Brad Hauser	United States	13:09
16	Mohamed Amyn	Morocco	13:09
17	Alejandro Suárez	Mexico	13:10
18	Tim Broe	United States	13:10
19	Andy Downin	United States	13:16
20	Luciano Di Pardo	Italy	13:18
21	Miroslav Vanko	Slovakia	13:19
22	Youssef Baba	Morocco	13:19
23	Luis Jesús	Portugal	13:20
24	Michael Power	Australia	13:21
25	Lotfi Turki	Tunisia	13:23
26	Alemayehu Girma	Ethiopia	13:24
27	Spencer Barden	United Kingdom	13:25
28	Wirimai Juwawo	Zimbabwe	13:26
29	Kevin Sullivan	Canada	13:27
30	Beruk Debrework	Ethiopia	13:27
31	Antonio Jiménez	Spain	13:28
32	John Nada Saya	Tanzania	13:28
33	Samir Benfarès	France	13:29
34	Salvador Miranda	Mexico	13:29
35	José Luis Blanco	Spain	13:29
36	Blair Martin	New Zealand	13:29
37	José Manuel Martínez	Spain	13:30
38	Christian Stephenson	United Kingdom	13:30
39	Tony Cosey	United States	13:30
40	Rustam Yakupov	Russia	13:31
41	Clint Wells	United States	13:31
42	João Junqueira	Portugal	13:32
43	Javier Carriqueo	Argentina	13:32
44	Joël Bourgeois	Canada	13:33
45	Hamish Thorpe	New Zealand	13:34
46	Dmitriy Maksimov	Russia	13:34
47	Oscar Cortínez	Argentina	13:35
48	José Ramos	Portugal	13:35
49	Roland Weissteiner	Italy	13:35
50	Godfrey Khahohle	South Africa	13:36
51	Sergey Lukin	Russia	13:36
52	Sean Kaley	Canada	13:37
53	Lorenzo Perrone	Italy	13:37
54	Gareth Turnbull	Ireland	13:38
55	Badre din Zioini	France	13:38
56	Glen Stewart	United Kingdom	13:38
57	Adrian Blincoe	New Zealand	13:41
58	Simon Maunder	New Zealand	13:43
59	Jean Bosco Ndagijimana	Rwanda	13:43
60	Mykola Novytskyy	Ukraine	13:43
61	Sergey Drygin	Russia	13:44
62	Jeremy Deere	Canada	13:45
63	Pacifique Ayabusa	Rwanda	13:46
64	Fabrice Chomaud	France	13:47
65	Tom Compernolle	Belgium	13:48
66	Rached Amor	Tunisia	13:49
67	Abdulkadir Türk	Turkey	13:49
68	Anacleto Jiménez	Spain	13:49
69	Ahmed Abd El Mangoud	Egypt	13:50
70	Manuel Silva	Portugal	13:50
71	Christian Obrist	Italy	13:50
72	Ahmed Issaoui	Tunisia	13:51
73	Hedi Khalfallah	Tunisia	13:52
74	Julius Gidabuday	Tanzania	13:54
75	Rob Whalley	United Kingdom	13:55
76	Jeroen van Dijke	Netherlands	13:56
77	Angus MacLean	United Kingdom	13:57
78	Matt Kerr	Canada	13:57
79	Musa Ninga	Tanzania	13:58
80	Jim Svenøy	Norway	13:58
81	Mesfin Hailu	Ethiopia	13:58
82	Vijay Pal	India	13:59
83	Domenico D'Ambrosio	Italy	14:00
84	Fiachra Lombard	Ireland	14:02
85	Dan Browne	United States	14:02
86	Pablo Villalobos	Spain	14:03
87	Carlos Calado	Portugal	14:04
88	Raúl Mora	Chile	14:05
89	Brahim Jabbour	Morocco	14:05
90	Abd Al-Rasool Ahmed	Egypt	14:06
91	Fabián Campanini	Argentina	14:07
92	Makoto Michiura	Japan	14:07
93	Arun D'Souza	India	14:10
94	Carlos Jaramillo	Chile	14:11
95	Sander Schutgens	Netherlands	14:12
96	Ridouane Es-Saadi	Belgium	14:13
97	Khalid Zoubaa	France	14:14
98	Kuldeep Kumar	India	14:14
99	Mauro Casagrande	Italy	14:14
100	Frédéric Desmedt	Belgium	14:15
101	Maurice van Veldhoven	Netherlands	14:18
102	Víctor Martínez	Andorra	14:19
103	Cristian Hidalgo	Chile	14:20
104	Jonathan Monje	Chile	14:21
105	Fouly Salem	Egypt	14:22
106	Eelco de Voogt	Netherlands	14:22
107	Simon Labiche	Seychelles	14:23
108	Mehdi Khelifi	Tunisia	14:24
109	Ivan Kibiryov	Uzbekistan	14:24
110	Zigmund Zilbershtein	Georgia	14:25
111	Jesús España	Spain	14:27
112	Aleksandr Busel	Belarus	14:28
113	Patrick Grammens	Belgium	14:29
114	Heiki Sarapuu	Estonia	14:30
115	Ad Verweij	Netherlands	14:32
116	Daniel Gidombada	Tanzania	14:34
117	Toomas Tarm	Estonia	14:35
118	José Mansilla	Argentina	14:36
119	Jürgen Vandewiele	Belgium	14:37
120	Mohamad Ayache	Lebanon	14:40
121	Sergey Zabavskiy	Tajikistan	14:40
122	Joeri Jansen	Belgium	14:46
123	Mostafa Shalaby	Egypt	14:46
124	Viktor Vasilyonok	Belarus	14:46
125	Denis Bagrev	Kyrgyzstan	14:47
126	Terukazu Omori	Japan	14:48
127	Yevgeniy Yurkevich	Belarus	14:51
128	Bahadur Singh	India	14:52
129	Bakhodur Boimuradov	Tajikistan	14:58
130	Mark Miles	United Kingdom	14:58
131	Joel Rosario	Puerto Rico	15:04
132	Uldar Nuraliev	Uzbekistan	15:05
133	Mahmoud Ayach	Lebanon	15:05
134	Gairat Nigmatov	Tajikistan	15:12
135	Albert Shamsiyev	Uzbekistan	15:19
136	Djamched Rasulov	Tajikistan	15:21
137	Ahmad El Darkouchi	Lebanon	15:21
138	Aleksandr Voran	Belarus	15:23
139	Fortunato Yaccob	Eritrea	15:26
140	Nozimjon Irmatov	Tajikistan	15:34
141	Kemal Tuvakuliyev	Turkmenistan	15:37
142	Richard Muscat	Gibraltar	15:42
143	Junji Konomi	Japan	15:44
144	Serdar Gandymov	Turkmenistan	15:53
145	Jacques Diab	Lebanon	15:57
146	Liam Byrne	Gibraltar	15:57
147	Mohamed Al-Bayed	Palestine	16:05
148	Nazar Begliyev	Turkmenistan	16:10
149	Sergey Yakovlev	Turkmenistan	16:19
150	Vladimir Escajadillo	Peru	16:27
151	Salimjon Ortykov	Tajikistan	16:28
152	Desimir Gajic	Yugoslavia	17:16
153	Lee Calderon	Gibraltar	17:30
154	Louis Chichon	Gibraltar	17:41
155	James Parody	Gibraltar	18:02
156	Yevgeniy Nujdin	Uzbekistan	18:54
—	Sergio López	Chile	DNF
—	Antonio Fabián Silio	Argentina	DNS
—	José Alberto Montenegro	Argentina	DNS
—	Jean-Paul Gahimbaré	Burundi	DNS
—	Jean-Berchmans Ndayisenga	Burundi	DNS
—	Hilaire Ntirampeba	Burundi	DNS
—	Emmanuel Murenzi	Rwanda	DNS
—	Jean Baptiste Simukeka	Rwanda	DNS
—	Ahmed Saeed Hassan	Somalia	DNS
—	Maximillian Iranqe	Tanzania	DNS
—	Alí Hakimi	Tunisia	DNS
—	Mike Fokorani	Zimbabwe	DNS
—	Farai Nemahwedza	Zimbabwe	DNS

==== Teams ====
Rank	Team	Points
1st place, gold medalist(s)	Kenya: Enock Koech / 1; Benjamin Limo / 3; Sammy Kipketer / 4; Cyrus Kataron / 5; (Albert Chepkurui) / (6); (John Kibowen) / (7)	13
2nd place, silver medalist(s)	Morocco: Brahim Boulami / 9; Adil Kaouch / 11; Saïd El Wardi / 12; Mohamed Amyn / 16; (Youssef Baba) / (22); (Brahim Jabbour) / (89)	48
3rd place, bronze medalist(s)	Ethiopia: Kenenisa Bekele / 2; Haylu Mekonnen / 10; Dagne Alemu / 13; Alemayehu Girma / 26; (Beruk Debrework) / (30); (Mesfin Hailu) / (81)	51
4	United States: Brad Hauser / 15; Tim Broe / 18; Andy Downin / 19; Tony Cosey / 39; (Clint Wells) / (41); (Dan Browne) / (85)	91
5	Spain: Antonio Jiménez / 31; José Luis Blanco / 35; José Manuel Martínez / 37; Anacleto Jiménez / 68; (Pablo Villalobos) / (86); (Jesús España) / (111)	171
6	Portugal: Luis Jesús / 23; João Junqueira / 42; José Ramos / 48; Manuel Silva / 70; (Carlos Calado) / (87)	183
7	Canada: Kevin Sullivan / 29; Joël Bourgeois / 44; Sean Kaley / 52; Jeremy Deere / 62; (Matt Kerr) / (78)	187
8	Italy: Luciano Di Pardo / 20; Roland Weissteiner / 49; Lorenzo Perrone / 53; Christian Obrist / 71; (Domenico D'Ambrosio) / (83); (Mauro Casagrande) / (99)	193
9	New Zealand: Blair Martin / 36; Hamish Thorpe / 45; Adrian Blincoe / 57; Simon Maunder / 58	196
10	United Kingdom: Spencer Barden / 27; Christian Stephenson / 38; Glen Stewart / 56; Rob Whalley / 75; (Angus MacLean) / (77); (Mark Miles) / (130)	196
11	Russia: Rustam Yakupov / 40; Dmitriy Maksimov / 46; Sergey Lukin / 51; Sergey Drygin / 61	198
12	Tanzania: John Yuda / 14; John Nada Saya / 32; Julius Gidabuday / 74; Musa Ninga / 79; (Daniel Gidombada) / (116)	199
13	Tunisia: Lotfi Turki / 25; Rached Amor / 66; Ahmed Issaoui / 72; Hedi Khalfallah / 73; (Mehdi Khelifi) / (108)	236
14	France: Samir Benfarès / 33; Badre din Zioini / 55; Fabrice Chomaud / 64; Khalid Zoubaa / 97	249
15	Argentina: Javier Carriqueo / 43; Oscar Cortínez / 47; Fabián Campanini / 91; José Mansilla / 118	299
16	Belgium: Tom Compernolle / 65; Ridouane Es-Saadi / 96; Frédéric Desmedt / 100; Patrick Grammens / 113; (Jürgen Vandewiele) / (119); (Joeri Jansen) / (122)	374
17	Netherlands: Jeroen van Dijke / 76; Sander Schutgens / 95; Maurice van Veldhoven / 101; Eelco de Voogt / 106; (Ad Verweij) / (115)	378
18	Egypt: Ahmed Abd El Mangoud / 69; Abd Al-Rasool Ahmed / 90; Fouly Salem / 105; Mostafa Shalaby / 123	387
19	Chile: Raúl Mora / 88; Carlos Jaramillo / 94; Cristian Hidalgo / 103; Jonathan Monje / 104; (Sergio López) / (DNF)	389
20	India: Vijay Pal / 82; Arun D'Souza / 93; Kuldeep Kumar / 98; Bahadur Singh / 128	401
21	Belarus: Aleksandr Busel / 112; Viktor Vasilyonok / 124; Yevgeniy Yurkevich / 127; Aleksandr Voran / 138	501
22	Tajikistan: Sergey Zabavskiy / 121; Bakhodur Boimuradov / 129; Gairat Nigmatov / 134; Djamched Rasulov / 136; (Nozimjon Irmatov) / (140); (Salimjon Ortykov) / (151)	520
23	Uzbekistan: Ivan Kibiryov / 109; Uldar Nuraliev / 132; Albert Shamsiyev / 135; Yevgeniy Nujdin / 156	532
24	Lebanon: Mohamad Ayache / 120; Mahmoud Ayach / 133; Ahmad El Darkouchi / 137; Jacques Diab / 145	535
25	Turkmenistan: Kemal Tuvakuliyev / 141; Serdar Gandymov / 144; Nazar Begliyev / 148; Sergey Yakovlev / 149	582
26	Gibraltar: Richard Muscat / 142; Liam Byrne / 146; Lee Calderon / 153; Louis Chichon / 154; (James Parody) / (155)	595

- Note: Athletes in parentheses did not score for the team result

== Participation ==
An unofficial count yields the participation of 157 athletes from 47 countries in the Men's short race. The announced athletes from Burundi and Somalia did not show.

- Andorra (1)
- Argentina (4)
- Australia (2)
- Belarus (4)
- Belgium (6)
- Canada (5)
- Chile (5)
- Egypt (4)
- Eritrea (1)
- Estonia (2)
- Ethiopia (6)
- France (4)
- Georgia (1)
- Gibraltar (5)
- India (4)
- Ireland (2)
- Italy (6)
- Japan (3)
- Kenya (6)
- Kyrgyzstan (1)
- Lebanon (4)
- Mexico (2)
- Morocco (6)
- Netherlands (5)
- New Zealand (4)
- Norway (1)
- Peru (1)
- Palestine (1)
- Portugal (5)
- Puerto Rico (1)
- Russia (4)
- Rwanda (2)
- Seychelles (1)
- Slovakia (1)
- South Africa (1)
- Spain (6)
- Tajikistan (6)
- Tanzania (5)
- Tunisia (5)
- Turkey (1)
- Turkmenistan (4)
- Ukraine (1)
- United Kingdom (6)
- United States (6)
- Uzbekistan (4)
- Yugoslavia (1)
- Zimbabwe (1)

== See also ==
- 2001 IAAF World Cross Country Championships – Senior men's race
- 2001 IAAF World Cross Country Championships – Junior men's race
- 2001 IAAF World Cross Country Championships – Senior women's race
- 2001 IAAF World Cross Country Championships – Women's short race
- 2001 IAAF World Cross Country Championships – Junior women's race
