= 2001 World Championships in Athletics – Men's 5000 metres =

These are the official results of the Men's 5.000 metres event at the 2001 World Championships in Edmonton, Alberta, Canada. There were a total number of 35 participating athletes, with the final held on Friday August 10, 2001.

== Medalists ==
Gold	Richard Limo; Kenya (KEN)
Silver	Million Wolde; Ethiopia (ETH)
Bronze	John Kibowen; Kenya (KEN)

== Records ==
Standing records prior to the 2001 World Athletics Championships
World Record	Haile Gebrselassie (ETH)	12:39.36	June 13, 1998	Helsinki, Finland
Event Record	Salah Hissou (MAR)	12:58.13	August 28, 1999	Seville, Spain
Season Best	Hailu Mekonnen (ETH)	12:58.57	June 29, 2001	Rome, Italy

== Final ==
Rank	Name	Result
	Richard Limo (KEN)	13:00.77
	Million Wolde (ETH)	13:03.47
	John Kibowen (KEN)	13:05.20
4.	Alberto García (ESP)	13:05.60
5.	Ismaïl Sghyr (FRA)	13:07.71
6.	Sammy Kipketer (KEN)	13:08.46
7.	Abiyote Abate (ETH)	13:14.07
8.	Hailu Mekonnen (ETH)	13:20.24
9.	Marius Bakken (NOR)	13:22.07
10.	Adam Goucher (USA)	13:24.00
11.	Driss El Himer (MAR)	13:28.14
12.	Mohammed El Amyn (MAR)	13:28.90
13.	Mohamed Said Wardi (MAR)	13:43.40
14.	Isaac Viciosa (ESP)	14:01.32
—	Ali Saïdi-Sief (ALG)	DSQ

== Qualifying heats ==
=== Heat 1 ===
Rank	Name	Result
1.	Million Wolde (ETH)	13:28.76
2.	Richard Limo (KEN)	13:28.78
3.	Driss El Himer (FRA)	13:28.87
4.	Abiyote Abate (ETH)	13:28.88
5.	Sammy Kipketer (KEN)	13:28.90
6.	Marius Bakken (NOR)	13:32.34
7.	Isaac Viciosa (ESP)	13:32.39
8.	Mohamed Saïd El Wardi (MAR)	13:36.24
9.	Mark Carroll (IRL)	13:37.27
10.	Mauricio Díaz (CHI)	13:38.07
11.	Khoudir Aggoune (ALG)	13:43.95
12.	Pablo Olmedo (MEX)	14:02.90
13.	Mohammed Yagoub (SUD)	14:03.27
14.	Ali Mabruk El-Zaidi (LBA)	14:16.08
15.	Nicholas Rogers (USA)	14:33.39
16.	Esam Salah Musleh Juaim (YEM)	15:21.11
17.	Chamkaur Singh Dhaliwal (SIN)	15:23.56
—	Ali Saïdi-Sief (ALG)	DSQ

=== Heat 2 ===
Rank	Name	Result
1.	Hailu Mekonnen (ETH)	13:32.11
2.	Ismaïl Sghyr (FRA)	13:32.60
3.	Adam Goucher (USA)	13:32.92
4.	Alberto García (ESP)	13:33.64
5.	Mohammed Amyn (MAR)	13:34.54
6.	John Kibowen (KEN)	13:35.09
7.	Samir Moussaoui (ALG)	13:40.09
8.	Ahmed Ibrahim Hashim (QAT)	13:41.07
9.	Sergiy Lebid (UKR)	13:43.78
10.	Yonas Kifle (ERI)	13:44.16
11.	Enrique Molina (ESP)	13:45.97
12.	Dennis Jensen (DEN)	13:47.90
13.	Michael Openshaw (GBR)	14:00.84
14.	Jafar Babakhani (IRI)	14:14.64
15.	Rodwell Kamwendo (MAW)	14:21.44
16.	Tom Compernolle (BEL)	14:27.83
17.	Jeremy Deere (CAN)	14:30.92

== See also ==
- 2000 Men's Olympic 5.000 metres
