= 1999 IAAF World Cross Country Championships – Junior men's race =

Junior men's race at the 1999 IAAF World Cross Country Championships
- Organisers: IAAF
- Edition: 27th
- Date: March 28
- Host city: Belfast, Northern Ireland, United Kingdom
- Venue: Barnett Demesne/Queen’s University Playing Fields
- Events: 1
- Distances: 8.012 km – Junior men
- Participation: 154 athletes from 43 nations

The Junior men's race at the 1999 IAAF World Cross Country Championships was held at the Barnett Demesne/Queen’s University Playing Fields in Belfast, Northern Ireland, United Kingdom, on March 28, 1999. Reports of the event were given in The New York Times, in the Herald, and for the IAAF.

Complete results for individuals, for teams, medallists, and the results of British athletes who took part were published.

== Race results ==
=== Junior men's race (8.012 km) ===
==== Individual ====
Rank	Athlete	Country	Time
1st place, gold medalist(s)	Haylu Mekonnen	Ethiopia	25:38
2nd place, silver medalist(s)	Richard Limo	Kenya	25:43
3rd place, bronze medalist(s)	Kipchumba Mitei	Kenya	25:45
4	Abiyote Abate	Ethiopia	25:46
5	Albert Chepkurui	Kenya	26:01
6	Sammy Kipketer	Kenya	26:06
7	Duncan Lebo	Kenya	26:14
8	Faustin Baha	Tanzania	26:15
9	Kenenisa Bekele	Ethiopia	26:27
10	Yibeltal Admassu	Ethiopia	26:28
11	Hailemariam Tegafaw	Ethiopia	26:59
12	Alene Emere	Ethiopia	27:00
13	Michael Hiiti	Tanzania	27:21
14	Christopher Soget	Kenya	27:27
15	Martin Sulle	Tanzania	27:29
16	Driss Benismail	Morocco	27:41
17	Craig Mottram	Australia	27:49
18	Ahmed El Hamzaoui	Morocco	27:51
19	Aïssa Dghoughi	Morocco	27:53
20	Fethi Meftah	Algeria	27:54
21	Jeffrey Gwebu	South Africa	27:58
22	Kazuyoshi Yamamoto	Japan	27:59
23	Seddik Sersar	Algeria	28:01
24	Fasil Bizuneh	United States	28:02
25	Martin Fedmowski	Australia	28:05
26	Abdelatif Chemlal	Morocco	28:05
27	Gustav Svedbrant	Sweden	28:08
28	Bencherki Kafkaf	Algeria	28:10
29	Isaiah Festa	United States	28:13
30	Filipe Pedro	Portugal	28:15
31	Pedro Nimo	Spain	28:16
32	Steven Vernon	United Kingdom	28:16
33	Luke Watson	United States	28:18
34	Makoto Tobimatsu	Japan	28:18
35	Henrik Ahnström	Sweden	28:18
36	Fernando Rey	Spain	28:19
37	Zolani Ntongana	South Africa	28:24
38	Sofiane Beddiaf	France	28:28
39	Roberto González	Spain	28:29
40	Steve Slattery	United States	28:29
41	Jumanne Tuluway	Tanzania	28:30
42	Aleksandr Sekletov	Russia	28:30
43	Joe McAlister	Ireland	28:30
44	Ionut Bura	Romania	28:34
45	Nourreddine Bourfaa	Algeria	28:35
46	Ricardo Franzon	Argentina	28:38
47	Tomonori Onitsuka	Japan	28:38
48	Ridouane Harroufi	Morocco	28:39
49	Kevin Paulsen	France	28:42
50	Oliver Laws	United Kingdom	28:43
51	Hans Janssens	Belgium	28:45
52	Timothy Clarke	Australia	28:45
53	Yousri Hamdi	Tunisia	28:46
54	Ricardo Serrano	Spain	28:47
55	Adam Tenforde	United States	28:48
56	Alistair Cragg	South Africa	28:48
57	Wirimai Juwawo	Zimbabwe	28:49
58	Gavin Thompson	United Kingdom	28:52
59	Sakir Kaya	Turkey	28:55
60	Lorenzo Perrone	Italy	28:56
61	James Vidal	Colombia	28:57
62	Sedat Karatas	Turkey	28:58
63	Willie McComb	Canada	29:00
64	Jorge Torres	United States	29:01
65	Mattia Maccagnan	Italy	29:02
66	Christian Obrist	Italy	29:05
67	Abdelkrim Kabbouri	Morocco	29:07
68	Turo Inkiläinen	Finland	29:09
69	Samuel Boden	United Kingdom	29:10
70	Jaime Baquero	Colombia	29:10
71	Bruno Mazzotta	Canada	29:10
72	Bahattin Ince	Turkey	29:11
73	Radu Stroia	Romania	29:12
74	Koen Raymaekers	Netherlands	29:13
75	Shinichiro Okuda	Japan	29:14
76	Masataka Inaka	Japan	29:16
77	Robert Maycock	United Kingdom	29:21
78	Yoshifumi Nomura	Japan	29:25
79	Rudy van der Oetelaar	Netherlands	29:25
80	Wajdi Adassi	Tunisia	29:26
81	Siyami Türkmen	Turkey	29:27
82	Brian Keane	Ireland	29:28
83	Lorenzo Cannata	Italy	29:30
84	Aman Saini	India	29:30
85	Boštjan Buč	Slovenia	29:31
86	Jamie Epp	Canada	29:34
87	Arbey Rivera	Colombia	29:34
88	Reda Khaldi	Algeria	29:39
89	Westley Alkin	Canada	29:39
90	Honest Dandara	Zimbabwe	29:40
91	Mohamed Ghodhbani	Tunisia	29:41
92	Ruben Díez	Spain	29:42
93	Lennon Wicks	Australia	29:43
94	Mika Oksanen	Finland	29:44
95	Guilherme Pizzirani	Brazil	29:46
96	Gary Murray	Ireland	29:46
97	Matthieu Vandiest	Belgium	29:50
98	Sivuyile Dlongwana	South Africa	29:51
99	Jonathan Matos	Brazil	29:52
100	Esmail Al-Dawla	Yemen	29:52
101	Ahmed Hussein	Egypt	29:53
102	Beniamino Lubrini	Italy	29:54
103	Fergal Feeney	Ireland	29:55
104	Stefan Beumer	Netherlands	29:57
105	Tuomas Inkiläinen	Finland	29:57
106	Sergey Denis	Belarus	29:57
107	Chris Thompson	United Kingdom	29:58
108	Lachlan Chisholm	Australia	30:03
109	Jukka Keskisalo	Finland	30:04
110	Joshua Zealand	Canada	30:06
111	Djamel Ahmadi	Algeria	30:07
112	Klaas Ramulutsi	South Africa	30:12
113	Mikko Suihkonen	Finland	30:14
114	Thiago Cecatto	Brazil	30:16
115	Joep Tigchelaar	Netherlands	30:17
116	Sergio Solis	Guatemala	30:17
117	Lorris Williams	Canada	30:18
118	Sylvester Mokalakane	South Africa	30:22
119	Francisco Alves	Spain	30:25
120	Fabio Lettieri	Italy	30:26
121	Kerem Karatas	Turkey	30:28
122	Moti Mizrahy	Israel	30:33
123	Simon Ward	Ireland	30:33
124	Shashi Prakash	India	30:36
125	Aleksey Volkov	Belarus	30:37
126	Touhami Abassi	Tunisia	30:45
127	Noel Kavanagh	Ireland	30:48
128	Denis Bagrev	Kyrgyzstan	30:50
129	Adel Gharsalli	Tunisia	30:56
130	Ala Al-Sakkaf	Yemen	31:00
131	Mohamed Al-Bayed	Palestine	31:01
132	Hassan Eisa	Egypt	31:02
133	Siarhei Yudenkov	Belarus	31:02
134	Sergey Milyutin	Kazakhstan	31:06
135	Farag Amer Fuad	Egypt	31:10
136	Nabil Al-Soufi	Yemen	31:12
137	Marcos Osorio	Guatemala	31:13
138	Dmitriy Baranovskiy	Belarus	31:16
139	Awad Abdallah	Egypt	31:23
140	Ivan Paz	Guatemala	31:26
141	Mobarock Mondal	India	31:35
142	Victor Ocampo	Colombia	31:36
143	Mustafa Al-Muhaya	Yemen	31:46
144	Manjunatha Basappa	India	31:56
145	Serdar Gandymov	Turkmenistan	32:08
146	Hoi Nam So	Hong Kong	32:11
147	Nader Al-Nasry	Palestine	32:50
148	Alex Lobos	Guatemala	32:50
149	Soondurnam Vardeyen	Mauritius	33:08
—	André da Silva	Brazil	DNF
—	Slavko Petrovic	Croatia	DNF
—	Ruben Indonga	Namibia	DNF
—	Andrey Pleskach	Turkmenistan	DNF
—	Mesfin Hailu	Ethiopia	DQ

==== Teams ====
Rank	Team	Points
1st place, gold medalist(s)	Kenya: Richard Limo / 2; Kipchumba Mitei / 3; Albert Chepkurui / 5; Sammy Kipketer / 6; (Duncan Lebo) / (7); (Christopher Soget) / (14)	16
2nd place, silver medalist(s)	Ethiopia: Haylu Mekonnen / 1; Abiyote Abate / 4; Kenenisa Bekele / 9; Yibeltal Admassu / 10; (Hailemariam Tegafaw) / (11); (Alene Emere) / (12)	24
3rd place, bronze medalist(s)	Tanzania: Faustin Baha / 8; Michael Hiiti / 13; Martin Sulle / 15; Jumanne Tuluway / 41	77
4	Morocco: Driss Benismail / 16; Ahmed El Hamzaoui / 18; Aïssa Dghoughi / 19; Abdelatif Chemlal / 26; (Ridouane Harroufi) / (48); (Abdelkrim Kabbouri) / (67)	79
5	Algeria: Fethi Meftah / 20; Seddik Sersar / 23; Bencherki Kafkaf / 28; Nourreddine Bourfaa / 45; (Reda Khaldi) / (88); (Djamel Ahmadi) / (111)	116
6	United States: Fasil Bizuneh / 24; Isaiah Festa / 29; Luke Watson / 33; Steve Slattery / 40; (Adam Tenforde) / (55); (Jorge Torres) / (64)	126
7	Spain: Pedro Nimo / 31; Fernando Rey / 36; Roberto González / 39; Ricardo Serrano / 54; (Ruben Díez) / (92); (Francisco Alves) / (119)	160
8	Japan: Kazuyoshi Yamamoto / 22; Makoto Tobimatsu / 34; Tomonori Onitsuka / 47; Shinichiro Okuda / 75; (Masataka Inaka) / (76); (Yoshifumi Nomura) / (78)	178
9	Australia: Craig Mottram / 17; Martin Fedmowski / 25; Timothy Clarke / 52; Lennon Wicks / 93; (Lachlan Chisholm) / (108)	187
10	United Kingdom: Steven Vernon / 32; Oliver Laws / 50; Gavin Thompson / 58; Samuel Boden / 69; (Robert Maycock) / (77); (Chris Thompson) / (107)	209
11	South Africa: Jeffrey Gwebu / 21; Zolani Ntongana / 37; Alistair Cragg / 56; Sivuyile Dlongwana / 98; (Klaas Ramulutsi) / (112); (Sylvester Mokalakane) / (118)	212
12	Turkey: Sakir Kaya / 59; Sedat Karatas / 62; Bahattin Ince / 72; Siyami Türkmen / 81; (Kerem Karatas) / (121)	274
13	Italy: Lorenzo Perrone / 60; Mattia Maccagnan / 65; Christian Obrist / 66; Lorenzo Cannata / 83; (Beniamino Lubrini) / (102); (Fabio Lettieri) / (120)	274
14	Canada: Willie McComb / 63; Bruno Mazzotta / 71; Jamie Epp / 86; Westley Alkin / 89; (Joshua Zealand) / (110); (Lorris Williams) / (117)	309
15	Ireland: Joe McAlister / 43; Brian Keane / 82; Gary Murray / 96; Fergal Feeney / 103; (Simon Ward) / (123); (Noel Kavanagh) / (127)	324
16	Tunisia: Yousri Hamdi / 53; Wajdi Adassi / 80; Mohamed Ghodhbani / 91; Touhami Abassi / 126; (Adel Gharsalli) / (129)	350
17	Colombia: James Vidal / 61; Jaime Baquero / 70; Arbey Rivera / 87; Victor Ocampo / 142	360
18	Netherlands: Koen Raymaekers / 74; Rudy van der Oetelaar / 79; Stefan Beumer / 104; Joep Tigchelaar / 115	372
19	Finland: Turo Inkiläinen / 68; Mika Oksanen / 94; Tuomas Inkiläinen / 105; Jukka Keskisalo / 109; (Mikko Suihkonen) / (113)	376
20	India: Aman Saini / 84; Shashi Prakash / 124; Mobarock Mondal / 141; Manjunatha Basappa / 144	493
21	Belarus: Sergey Denis / 106; Aleksey Volkov / 125; Siarhei Yudenkov / 133; Dmitriy Baranovskiy / 138	502
22	Egypt: Ahmed Hussein / 101; Hassan Eisa / 132; Farag Amer Fuad / 135; Awad Abdallah / 139	507
23	Yemen: Esmail Al-Dawla / 100; Ala Al-Sakkaf / 130; Nabil Al-Soufi / 136; Mustafa Al-Muhaya / 143	509
24	Guatemala: Sergio Solis / 116; Marcos Osorio / 137; Ivan Paz / 140; Alex Lobos / 148	541
DNF	Brazil: (Guilherme Pizzirani) / (95); (Jonathan Matos) / (99); (Thiago Cecatto) / (114); (André da Silva) / (DNF)	DNF

- Note: Athletes in parentheses did not score for the team result

== Participation ==
An unofficial count yields the participation of 154 athletes from 43 countries in the Junior men's race. This is in agreement with the official numbers as published.

- Algeria (6)
- Argentina (1)
- Australia (5)
- Belarus (4)
- Belgium (2)
- Brazil (4)
- Canada (6)
- Colombia (4)
- Croatia (1)
- Egypt (4)
- Ethiopia (7)
- Finland (5)
- France (2)
- Guatemala (4)
- Hong Kong (1)
- India (4)
- Ireland (6)
- Israel (1)
- Italy (6)
- Japan (6)
- Kazakhstan (1)
- Kenya (6)
- Kyrgyzstan (1)
- Mauritius (1)
- Morocco (6)
- Namibia (1)
- Netherlands (4)
- Palestine (2)
- Portugal (1)
- Romania (2)
- Russia (1)
- Slovenia (1)
- South Africa (6)
- Spain (6)
- Sweden (2)
- Tanzania (4)
- Tunisia (5)
- Turkey (5)
- Turkmenistan (2)
- United Kingdom (6)
- United States (6)
- Yemen (4)
- Zimbabwe (2)

== See also ==
- 1999 IAAF World Cross Country Championships – Senior men's race
- 1999 IAAF World Cross Country Championships – Men's short race
- 1999 IAAF World Cross Country Championships – Senior women's race
- 1999 IAAF World Cross Country Championships – Women's short race
- 1999 IAAF World Cross Country Championships – Junior women's race
