= 2001 IAAF World Cross Country Championships =

Coordinates: 51°13′28″N 2°54′02″E

- Organisers: IAAF
- Edition: 29th
- Date: March 24/25
- Host city: Ostend, West Flanders, Belgium
- Venue: Hippodrome Wellington
- Events: 6
- Distances: 12.3 km – Senior men 4.1 km – Men's short 7.7 km – Junior men 7.7 km – Senior women 4.1 km – Women's short 5.9 km – Junior women
- Participation: 790 athletes from 67 nations

The 2001 IAAF World Cross Country Championships took place on March 24/25, 2001. The races were held at the Hippodrome Wellington in Ostend (Oostende), Belgium. Reports of the event were given in The New York Times, in the Herald, and for the IAAF.

Complete results for senior men, for senior men's teams, for men's short race, for men's short race teams, for junior men, for junior men's teams, senior women, for senior women's teams, for women's short race, for women's short race teams, for junior women, for junior women's teams, medallists, and the results of British athletes who took part were published.

== Medallists ==
Event	Gold		Silver		Bronze	
Individual
Senior men (12.3 km)	Mohammed Mourhit; Belgium	39:53	Sergiy Lebid; Ukraine	40:03	Charles Kamathi; Kenya	40:05
Men's short (4.1 km)	Enock Koech; Kenya	12:40	Kenenisa Bekele; Ethiopia	12:42	Benjamin Limo; Kenya	12:43
Junior men (7.7 km)	Kenenisa Bekele; Ethiopia	25:04	Duncan Lebo; Kenya	25:37	Dathan Ritzenhein; United States	25:46
Senior women (7.7 km)	Paula Radcliffe; United Kingdom	27:49	Gete Wami; Ethiopia	27:52	Lydia Cheromei; Kenya	28:07
Women's short (4.1 km)	Gete Wami; Ethiopia	14:46	Paula Radcliffe; United Kingdom	14:47	Edith Masai; Kenya	14:57
Junior women (5.9 km)	Viola Kibiwott; Kenya	22:05	Abebech Nigussie; Ethiopia	22:05	Aster Bacha; Ethiopia	22:05
Team
Senior men	Kenya	33	France	72	United States	87
Men's short	Kenya	13	Morocco	48	Ethiopia	51
Junior men	Kenya	24	Ethiopia	25	Uganda	68
Senior women	Kenya	18	Ethiopia	70	France	77
Women's short	Ethiopia	26	Kenya	32	Romania	78
Junior women	Ethiopia	16	Kenya	20	Japan	59

== Race results ==
=== Senior men's race (12.3 km) ===
Individual race
Rank	Athlete	Country	Time
1st place, gold medalist(s)	Mohammed Mourhit	Belgium	39:53
2nd place, silver medalist(s)	Sergiy Lebid	Ukraine	40:03
3rd place, bronze medalist(s)	Charles Kamathi	Kenya	40:05
4	Paulo Guerra	Portugal	40:06
5	Paul Kosgei	Kenya	40:09
6	Driss El Himer	France	40:13
7	Patrick Ivuti	Kenya	40:16
8	Hélder Ornelas	Portugal	40:33
9	Alejandro Gómez	Spain	40:37
10	Róbert Štefko	Slovakia	40:41
11	Mustafa El Ahmadi	France	40:42
12	Bob Kennedy	United States	40:43
Full results

Teams
Rank	Team	Points
1st place, gold medalist(s)	Kenya: Charles Kamathi / 3; Paul Kosgei / 5; Patrick Ivuti / 7; Enock Mitei / 18; (John Cheruiyot Korir) / (28); (Richard Limo) / (32)	33
2nd place, silver medalist(s)	France: Driss El Himer / 6; Mustafa El Ahmadi / 11; Lyes Ramoul / 26; Mikaël Thomas / 29; (Mohamed Serbouti) / (72); (Larbi Zéroual) / (88)	72
3rd place, bronze medalist(s)	United States: Bob Kennedy / 12; Meb Keflezighi / 13; Abdi Abdirahman / 15; Nick Rogers / 47; (Greg Jimmerson) / (52); (Matt Downin) / (80)	87
4	Spain	100
5	Portugal	100
6	Italy	103
7	Belgium	139
8	Ireland	146
Full results

- Note: Athletes in parentheses did not score for the team result

=== Men's short race (4.1 km) ===
Individual race
Rank	Athlete	Country	Time
1st place, gold medalist(s)	Enock Koech	Kenya	12:40
2nd place, silver medalist(s)	Kenenisa Bekele	Ethiopia	12:42
3rd place, bronze medalist(s)	Benjamin Limo	Kenya	12:43
4	Sammy Kipketer	Kenya	12:44
5	Cyrus Kataron	Kenya	12:45
6	Albert Chepkurui	Kenya	12:46
7	John Kibowen	Kenya	12:49
8	Craig Mottram	Australia	12:49
9	Brahim Boulami	Morocco	13:00
10	Haylu Mekonnen	Ethiopia	13:03
11	Adil Kaouch	Morocco	13:06
12	Saïd El Wardi	Morocco	13:08
Full results

Teams
Rank	Team	Points
1st place, gold medalist(s)	Kenya: Enock Koech / 1; Benjamin Limo / 3; Sammy Kipketer / 4; Cyrus Kataron / 5; (Albert Chepkurui) / (6); (John Kibowen) / (7)	13
2nd place, silver medalist(s)	Morocco: Brahim Boulami / 9; Adil Kaouch / 11; Saïd El Wardi / 12; Mohamed Amyn / 16; (Youssef Baba) / (22); (Brahim Jabbour) / (89)	48
3rd place, bronze medalist(s)	Ethiopia: Kenenisa Bekele / 2; Haylu Mekonnen / 10; Dagne Alemu / 13; Alemayehu Girma / 26; (Beruk Debrework) / (30); (Mesfin Hailu) / (81)	51
4	United States	91
5	Spain	171
6	Portugal	183
7	Canada	187
8	Italy	193
Full results

- Note: Athletes in parentheses did not score for the team result

=== Junior men's race (7.7 km) ===
Individual race
Rank	Athlete	Country	Time
1st place, gold medalist(s)	Kenenisa Bekele	Ethiopia	25:04
2nd place, silver medalist(s)	Duncan Lebo	Kenya	25:37
3rd place, bronze medalist(s)	Dathan Ritzenhein	United States	25:46
4	Nicholas Kemboi	Kenya	25:52
5	Matt Tegenkamp	United States	25:55
6	Robert Kipchumba	Kenya	26:00
7	Alemayehu Tedla	Ethiopia	26:02
8	Maregu Zewdie	Ethiopia	26:14
9	Beruk Debrework	Ethiopia	26:15
10	Paul Wakou	Uganda	26:17
11	Jean Baptiste Simukeka	Rwanda	26:22
12	Edwin Koech	Kenya	26:37
Full results

Teams
Rank	Team	Points
1st place, gold medalist(s)	Kenya: Duncan Lebo / 2; Nicholas Kemboi / 4; Robert Kipchumba / 6; Edwin Koech / 12; (Wilson Chelal) / (13); (Kiplimo Muneria) / (21)	24
2nd place, silver medalist(s)	Ethiopia: Kenenisa Bekele / 1; Alemayehu Tedla / 7; Maregu Zewdie / 8; Beruk Debrework / 9; (Tibebu Yenew) / (20); (Fekadu Gemeda) / (33)	25
3rd place, bronze medalist(s)	Uganda: Paul Wakou / 10; Johnny Okello / 16; Francis Musani / 19; Moses Mpanga / 23; (Francis Yiga) / (25)	68
4	United States	71
5	Morocco	95
6	Canada	171
7	Eritrea	190
8	Algeria	206
Full results

- Note: Athletes in parentheses did not score for the team result

=== Senior women's race (7.7 km) ===
Individual race
Rank	Athlete	Country	Time
1st place, gold medalist(s)	Paula Radcliffe	United Kingdom	27:49
2nd place, silver medalist(s)	Gete Wami	Ethiopia	27:52
3rd place, bronze medalist(s)	Lydia Cheromei	Kenya	28:07
4	Susan Chepkemei	Kenya	28:13
5	Pamela Chepchumba	Kenya	28:20
6	Leah Malot	Kenya	28:36
7	Yamna Belkacem	France	28:40
8	Merima Denboba	Ethiopia	28:52
9	Olivera Jevtić	Yugoslavia	29:03
10	Anja Smolders	Belgium	29:17
11	Rakiya Maraoui	France	29:24
12	Deena Drossin	United States	29:28
Full results

Teams
Rank	Team	Points
1st place, gold medalist(s)	Kenya: Lydia Cheromei / 3; Susan Chepkemei / 4; Pamela Chepchumba / 5; Leah Malot / 6; (Hellen Kimaiyo) / (14); (Sally Barsosio) / (18)	18
2nd place, silver medalist(s)	Ethiopia: Gete Wami / 2; Merima Denboba / 8; Eyerusalem Kuma / 23; Leila Aman / 37; (Merima Hashim) / (41); (Atalelech Ketema) / (46)	70
3rd place, bronze medalist(s)	France: Yamna Belkacem / 7; Rakiya Maraoui / 11; Rodica Moroianu / 24; Zahia Dahmani / 35; (Fatima Yvelain) / (43); (Chantal Dällenbach) / (73)	77
4	United Kingdom	83
5	Portugal	95
6	Italy	117
7	Spain	119
8	United States	130
Full results

- Note: Athletes in parentheses did not score for the team result

=== Women's short race (4.1 km) ===
Individual race
Rank	Athlete	Country	Time
1st place, gold medalist(s)	Gete Wami	Ethiopia	14:46
2nd place, silver medalist(s)	Paula Radcliffe	United Kingdom	14:47
3rd place, bronze medalist(s)	Edith Masai	Kenya	14:57
4	Merima Denboba	Ethiopia	15:04
5	Worknesh Kidane	Ethiopia	15:06
6	Benita Willis	Australia	15:06
7	Carla Sacramento	Portugal	15:07
8	Rose Cheruiyot	Kenya	15:07
9	Asmae Leghzaoui	Morocco	15:08
10	Margaret Ngotho	Kenya	15:20
11	Naomi Mugo	Kenya	15:24
12	Kathy Butler	United Kingdom	15:25
Full results

Teams
Rank	Team	Points
1st place, gold medalist(s)	Ethiopia: Gete Wami / 1; Merima Denboba / 4; Worknesh Kidane / 5; Genet Gebregiorgis / 16; (Ayelech Worku) / (18); (Hareg Sidelil) / (61)	26
2nd place, silver medalist(s)	Kenya: Edith Masai / 3; Rose Cheruiyot / 8; Margaret Ngotho / 10; Naomi Mugo / 11; (Salome Chepchumba) / (34); (Pamela Anisumuk) / (44)	32
3rd place, bronze medalist(s)	Romania: Elena Fidatof / 13; Iulia Olteanu / 15; Cristina Grosu / 23; Mihaela Botezan / 27; (Constantina Diţă) / (33); (Cristina Casandra) / (37)	78
4	United Kingdom	81
5	Morocco	109
6	Ireland	152
7	Portugal	157
8	Tanzania	158
Full results

- Note: Athletes in parentheses did not score for the team result

=== Junior women's race (5.9 km) ===
Individual race
Rank	Athlete	Country	Time
1st place, gold medalist(s)	Viola Kibiwott	Kenya	22:05
2nd place, silver medalist(s)	Abebech Nigussie	Ethiopia	22:05
3rd place, bronze medalist(s)	Aster Bacha	Ethiopia	22:05
4	Vivian Cheruiyot	Kenya	22:06
5	Tirunesh Dibaba	Ethiopia	22:08
6	Tereza Yohanes	Ethiopia	22:10
7	Fridah Domongole	Kenya	22:12
8	Sally Kipyego	Kenya	22:22
9	Peninah Chepchumba	Kenya	22:24
10	Mestawat Tufa	Ethiopia	22:24
11	Naoko Sakata	Japan	22:36
12	Christine Kalmer	South Africa	22:45
Full results

Teams
Rank	Team	Points
1st place, gold medalist(s)	Ethiopia: Abebech Nigussie / 2; Aster Bacha / 3; Tirunesh Dibaba / 5; Tereza Yohanes / 6; (Mestawat Tufa) / (10)	16
2nd place, silver medalist(s)	Kenya: Viola Kibiwott / 1; Vivian Cheruiyot / 4; Fridah Domongole / 7; Sally Kipyego / 8; (Peninah Chepchumba) / (9); (Alice Timbilil) / (16)	20
3rd place, bronze medalist(s)	Japan: Naoko Sakata / 11; Tomomi Tagao / 13; Emi Ikeda / 17; Mika Matsumoto / 18; (Mikayo Udo) / (25); (Hiromi Koga) / (35)	59
4	Australia	107
5	South Africa	136
6	United Kingdom	141
7	Russia	164
8	Algeria	201
Full results

- Note: Athletes in parentheses did not score for the team result

== Medal table (unofficial) ==
* Host nation (Belgium)

Rank	Nation	Gold	Silver	Bronze	Total
1	Kenya	6	3	4	13
2	Ethiopia	4	5	2	11
3	Great Britain	1	1	0	2
4	Belgium*	1	0	0	1
5	France	0	1	1	2
6	Morocco	0	1	0	1
6	Ukraine	0	1	0	1
8	United States	0	0	2	2
9	Japan	0	0	1	1
9	Romania	0	0	1	1
9	Uganda	0	0	1	1
Totals (11 entries)		12	12	12	36

- Note: Totals include both individual and team medals, with medals in the team competition counting as one medal.

== Participation ==
An unofficial count yields the participation of 790 athletes from 67 countries. This is in agreement with the official numbers as published. The announced athletes from Nigeria and Somalia did not show.

- Algeria (18)
- Andorra (2)
- Argentina (10)
- Australia (17)
- Austria (1)
- Belarus (24)
- Belgium (35)
- Bolivia (1)
- Botswana (5)
- Brazil (20)
- Burundi (8)
- Cameroon (2)
- Canada (33)
- Chile (10)
- Costa Rica (1)
- Croatia (2)
- Ecuador (5)
- Egypt (12)
- Eritrea (12)
- Estonia (4)
- Ethiopia (30)
- France (26)
- Georgia (1)
- Gibraltar (8)
- Hong Kong (1)
- India (24)
- Ireland (22)
- Italy (30)
- Japan (24)
- Kenya (36)
- Kyrgyzstan (2)
- Lebanon (8)
- Lesotho (2)
- Malawi (4)
- Mexico (12)
- Morocco (17)
- Netherlands (7)
- New Zealand (6)
- Norway (2)
- Palestine (2)
- Peru (1)
- Portugal (27)
- Puerto Rico (4)
- Romania (7)
- Russia (12)
- Rwanda (3)
- Seychelles (1)
- Slovakia (2)
- South Africa (14)
- Spain (35)
- Eswatini (5)
- Sweden (2)
- Switzerland (1)
- Tajikistan (12)
- Tanzania (19)
- Tunisia (7)
- Turkey (9)
- Turkmenistan (20)
- Uganda (5)
- Ukraine (3)
- United Kingdom (35)
- United States (36)
- Uzbekistan (24)
- Yemen (4)
- Yugoslavia (4)
- Zambia (8)
- Zimbabwe (4)

== See also ==
- 2001 IAAF World Cross Country Championships – Senior men's race
- 2001 IAAF World Cross Country Championships – Men's short race
- 2001 IAAF World Cross Country Championships – Junior men's race
- 2001 IAAF World Cross Country Championships – Senior women's race
- 2001 IAAF World Cross Country Championships – Women's short race
- 2001 IAAF World Cross Country Championships – Junior women's race
- 2001 in athletics (track and field)
