= 2000 World Junior Championships in Athletics – Men's 5000 metres =

The men's 5000 metres event at the 2000 World Junior Championships in Athletics was held in Santiago, Chile, at Estadio Nacional Julio Martínez Prádanos on 18 and 21 October.

== Medalists ==
Gold	Gordon Mugi; Kenya
Silver	Kenenisa Bekele; Ethiopia
Bronze	Cyrus Kataron; Kenya

== Results ==
=== Final ===
21 October

Rank	Name	Nationality	Time	Notes
1st place, gold medalist(s)	Gordon Mugi	Kenya	13:44.93	
2nd place, silver medalist(s)	Kenenisa Bekele	Ethiopia	13:45.43	
3rd place, bronze medalist(s)	Cyrus Kataron	Kenya	13:46.12	
4	Obed Mutanya	Zambia	13:46.33	
5	Beruk Debrework	Ethiopia	13:54.17	
6	Khoudir Aggoune	Algeria	14:01.16	
7	Cutbert Nyasango	Zimbabwe	14:02.02	
8	Aïssa Dghoughi	Morocco	14:07.30	
9	Onèsphore Nkunzimana	Burundi	14:07.67	
10	Mo Farah	United Kingdom	14:12.21	
11	Chris Thompson	United Kingdom	14:13.91	
12	Said Al-Harasi	Qatar	14:14.45	
13	Vasyl Matviychuk	Ukraine	14:31.27	
14	Jeffrey Gwebu	South Africa	14:41.31	
15	Gustav Svedbrant	Sweden	14:53.79	

=== Heats ===
18 October

==== Heat 1 ====
Rank	Name	Nationality	Time	Notes
1	Gordon Mugi	Kenya	14:07.37	Q
2	Kenenisa Bekele	Ethiopia	14:15.35	Q
3	Cutbert Nyasango	Zimbabwe	14:15.88	Q
4	Aïssa Dghoughi	Morocco	14:20.81	Q
5	Chris Thompson	United Kingdom	14:25.46	Q
6	Vasyl Matviychuk	Ukraine	14:32.99	q
7	Takamasa Uchida	Japan	14:43.59	
8	Nasser Al-Bishi	Saudi Arabia	14:45.09	
9	Idris Yousef	Qatar	14:51.46	

==== Heat 2 ====
Rank	Name	Nationality	Time	Notes
1	Cyrus Kataron	Kenya	14:10.38	Q
2	Onèsphore Nkunzimana	Burundi	14:10.60	Q
3	Obed Mutanya	Zambia	14:10.71	Q
4	Beruk Debrework	Ethiopia	14:11.19	Q
5	Mo Farah	United Kingdom	14:18.82	Q
6	Khoudir Aggoune	Algeria	14:19.68	q
7	Said Al-Harasi	Qatar	14:22.91	q
8	Jeffrey Gwebu	South Africa	14:31.10	q
9	Gustav Svedbrant	Sweden	14:32.72	q
10	Kazuhiro Maeda	Japan	14:36.76	

== Participation ==
According to an unofficial count, 19 athletes from 14 countries participated in the event.

- Algeria (1)
- Burundi (1)
- Ethiopia (2)
- Japan (2)
- Kenya (2)
- Morocco (1)
- Qatar (2)
- Saudi Arabia (1)
- South Africa (1)
- Sweden (1)
- Ukraine (1)
- United Kingdom (2)
- Zambia (1)
- Zimbabwe (1)
