= 2002 African Championships in Athletics – Men's 5000 metres =

The men's 5000 metres event at the 2002 African Championships in Athletics was held in Radès, Tunisia on August 10.

== Results ==
Rank	Name	Nationality	Time	Notes
1st place, gold medalist(s)	Paul Bitok	Kenya	13:31.95	
2nd place, silver medalist(s)	Benjamin Limo	Kenya	13:32.10	
3rd place, bronze medalist(s)	Mohammed Amyn	Morocco	13:33.98	
4	Khoudir Aggoune	Algeria	13:34.96	
5	Salah Hissou	Morocco	13:36.79	
6	Yonas Kifle	Eritrea	13:37.01	
7	Abebe Dinkesa	Ethiopia	13:42.30	
8	Ridha Amri	Tunisia	13:49.09	
9	Mohamed Khaldi	Algeria	13:52.33	
10	Tegema Abshero	Ethiopia	13:52.47	
11	Mark Bett	Kenya	13:54.03	
12	Ali Abdalla	Eritrea	13:54.57	
13	Dieudonné Disi	Rwanda	14:05.58	
14	Mohamed Saïd El Wardi	Morocco	14:05.62	
15	Ahmed Khamlaoui	Tunisia	14:33.41	
16	Teklemariam Mered	Eritrea	14:34.11	
17	Ibrahim Djama	Djibouti	15:28.97	
18	Said Dahir Abdi	Somalia	15:41.15	
19	Fahran Ali	Somalia	16:02.76	
	Ould Nagi	Mauritania	DNF	
	Mohamed Babiker	Sudan	DNS	
	Million Wolde	Ethiopia	DNS	
