= 2001 IAAF World Cross Country Championships – Women's short race =

Women's short race at the 2001 IAAF World Cross Country Championships
- Organisers: IAAF
- Edition: 29th
- Date: 25 March
- Host city: Ostend, West Flanders, Belgium
- Venue: Hippodrome Wellington
- Events: 6
- Distances: 4.1 km – Women's short
- Participation: 114 athletes from 34 nations

The Women's short race at the 2001 IAAF World Cross Country Championships was held at the Hippodrome Wellington in Ostend (Oostende), Belgium, on 25 March 2001. Reports of the event were given in The New York Times, in the Herald, and for the IAAF.

Complete results for individuals, for teams, medallists, and the results of British athletes who took part were published.

== Race results ==
=== Women's short race (4.1 km) ===
==== Individual ====
Rank	Athlete	Country	Time
1st place, gold medalist(s)	Gete Wami	Ethiopia	14:46
2nd place, silver medalist(s)	Paula Radcliffe	United Kingdom	14:47
3rd place, bronze medalist(s)	Edith Masai	Kenya	14:57
4	Merima Denboba	Ethiopia	15:04
5	Worknesh Kidane	Ethiopia	15:06
6	Benita Willis	Australia	15:06
7	Carla Sacramento	Portugal	15:07
8	Rose Cheruiyot	Kenya	15:07
9	Asmae Leghzaoui	Morocco	15:08
10	Margaret Ngotho	Kenya	15:20
11	Naomi Mugo	Kenya	15:24
12	Kathy Butler	United Kingdom	15:25
13	Elena Fidatof	Romania	15:25
14	Anastasiya Zubova	Russia	15:31
15	Iulia Olteanu	Romania	15:32
16	Genet Gebregiorgis	Ethiopia	15:33
17	Sabina Fischer	Switzerland	15:36
18	Ayelech Worku	Ethiopia	15:36
19	Anna Ndege	Tanzania	15:37
20	Anne Keenan-Buckley	Ireland	15:37
21	Malika Asahssah	Morocco	15:38
22	Maria McCambridge	Ireland	15:42
23	Cristina Grosu	Romania	15:42
24	Restituta Joseph	Tanzania	15:43
25	Fatiha Baouf	Belgium	15:44
26	Olga Romanova	Russia	15:45
27	Mihaela Botezan	Romania	15:50
28	Tina Connelly	Canada	15:53
29	Zhor El Kamch	Morocco	15:54
30	René Kalmer	South Africa	15:55
31	Una English	Ireland	15:55
32	Amanda Parkinson	United Kingdom	15:56
33	Constantina Diţă	Romania	15:58
34	Salome Chepchumba	Kenya	15:59
35	Helen Pattinson	United Kingdom	15:59
36	Sonja Stolić	Yugoslavia	16:01
37	Cristina Casandra	Romania	16:04
38	Elva Dryer	United States	16:05
39	Sigrid van den Bempt	Belgium	16:06
40	María Paredes	Ecuador	16:06
41	Hana Chaouach	Tunisia	16:08
42	Marta Domínguez	Spain	16:09
43	Judit Plá	Spain	16:10
44	Pamela Anisumuk	Kenya	16:11
45	Adélia Elias	Portugal	16:12
46	Leah Pells	Canada	16:12
47	Lisa Karnopp Nye	United States	16:13
48	Sarah Schwald	United States	16:13
49	Ana Oliveira	Portugal	16:16
50	Seloua Ouaziz	Morocco	16:18
51	Robyn Meagher	Canada	16:18
52	Samukeliso Moyo	Zimbabwe	16:19
53	Tausi Juma	Tanzania	16:20
54	Rosa Morató	Spain	16:20
55	Kristin Ihle	United States	16:21
56	Fátima Cabral	Portugal	16:24
57	Jéssica Augusto	Portugal	16:25
58	Ednalva da Silva	Brazil	16:26
59	Cheri Kenah	United States	16:26
60	Jacqueline Martín	Spain	16:28
61	Hareg Sidelil	Ethiopia	16:29
62	Hawa Hamis Hussein	Tanzania	16:31
63	Banuelia Mrashani	Tanzania	16:32
64	Liliya Volkova	Russia	16:33
65	Stefanija Statkuvienė	Belgium	16:34
66	Collette Liss	United States	16:37
67	Maryna Dubrova	Ukraine	16:38
68	Mariya Pantyukhova	Russia	16:40
69	Carmen Douma	Canada	16:41
70	Anna Kotenkova	Belarus	16:42
71	Juliet Potter	United Kingdom	16:43
72	Yumiko Okamoto	Japan	16:44
73	Ouafa Frekech	Morocco	16:47
74	Kim Offergeld	Belgium	16:49
75	Lwiza John	Tanzania	16:51
76	Patricia Arribas	Spain	16:53
77	Fatma Lanouar	Tunisia	16:58
78	Jenny Brown	United Kingdom	16:59
79	Freda Davoren	Ireland	17:01
80	Silvia Paredes	Ecuador	17:03
81	Nathalie Deroubaix	Belgium	17:03
82	Marlene Acuña	Ecuador	17:07
83	Sara Palmas	Italy	17:12
84	Madhuri Saxena	India	17:13
85	Lurdes Vaz	Portugal	17:16
86	Célia dos Santos	Brazil	17:20
87	Corinne Debaets	Belgium	17:20
88	Yvonne van der Kolk	Netherlands	17:21
89	Tracy Robertson	Canada	17:24
90	Tania Poma	Bolivia	17:26
91	Ana de Souza	Brazil	17:45
92	Kary Tripp	Mexico	17:46
93	Narcisa Calderón	Ecuador	17:52
94	Guylsara Dadabayeva	Tajikistan	17:54
95	Madhuri Gurnule	India	17:59
96	Platima Bhandari	India	18:08
97	Krystina Kirova	Belarus	18:10
98	Tatyana Tratsyuk	Belarus	18:13
99	Natalya Ilyashuk	Belarus	18:16
100	Yuliya Arfipova	Uzbekistan	18:18
101	Renuka Hegde	India	18:29
102	Sindi Hlawe	Eswatini	18:32
103	Jocinalva Valentim	Brazil	18:45
104	Wilma Guerra	Ecuador	19:01
105	Zamira Amirova	Uzbekistan	19:08
106	Diala El-Chabi	Lebanon	19:10
107	Kamilla Ramazanova	Uzbekistan	19:34
108	Mirvette Hamze	Lebanon	19:40
109	Nargiza Tohtanazarova	Uzbekistan	19:53
110	Alena Petrova	Turkmenistan	21:01
111	Rozaliya Zilyayeva	Turkmenistan	21:21
112	Yevgeniya Balabkina	Turkmenistan	21:54
113	Lyudmila Polatova	Turkmenistan	22:09
—	Sonia O'Sullivan	Ireland	DNF
—	Sandra Baumann	Austria	DNS
—	Krestena Sullivan	Canada	DNS
—	María Cristina Petite	Spain	DNS
—	Olivera Jevtić	Yugoslavia	DNS

==== Teams ====
Rank	Team	Points
1st place, gold medalist(s)	Ethiopia: Gete Wami / 1; Merima Denboba / 4; Worknesh Kidane / 5; Genet Gebregiorgis / 16; (Ayelech Worku) / (18); (Hareg Sidelil) / (61)	26
2nd place, silver medalist(s)	Kenya: Edith Masai / 3; Rose Cheruiyot / 8; Margaret Ngotho / 10; Naomi Mugo / 11; (Salome Chepchumba) / (34); (Pamela Anisumuk) / (44)	32
3rd place, bronze medalist(s)	Romania: Elena Fidatof / 13; Iulia Olteanu / 15; Cristina Grosu / 23; Mihaela Botezan / 27; (Constantina Diţă) / (33); (Cristina Casandra) / (37)	78
4	United Kingdom: Paula Radcliffe / 2; Kathy Butler / 12; Amanda Parkinson / 32; Helen Pattinson / 35; (Juliet Potter) / (71); (Jenny Brown) / (78)	81
5	Morocco: Asmae Leghzaoui / 9; Malika Asahssah / 21; Zhor El Kamch / 29; Seloua Ouaziz / 50; (Ouafa Frekech) / (73)	109
6	Ireland: Anne Keenan-Buckley / 20; Maria McCambridge / 22; Una English / 31; Freda Davoren / 79; (Sonia O'Sullivan) / (DNF)	152
7	Portugal: Carla Sacramento / 7; Adélia Elias / 45; Ana Oliveira / 49; Fátima Cabral / 56; (Jéssica Augusto) / (57); (Lurdes Vaz) / (85)	157
8	Tanzania: Anna Ndege / 19; Restituta Joseph / 24; Tausi Juma / 53; Hawa Hamis Hussein / 62; (Banuelia Mrashani) / (63); (Lwiza John) / (75)	158
9	Russia: Anastasiya Zubova / 14; Olga Romanova / 26; Liliya Volkova / 64; Mariya Pantyukhova / 68	172
10	United States: Elva Dryer / 38; Lisa Karnopp Nye / 47; Sarah Schwald / 48; Kristin Ihle / 55; (Cheri Kenah) / (59); (Collette Liss) / (66)	188
11	Canada: Tina Connelly / 28; Leah Pells / 46; Robyn Meagher / 51; Carmen Douma / 69; (Tracy Robertson) / (89)	194
12	Spain: Marta Domínguez / 42; Judit Plá / 43; Rosa Morató / 54; Jacqueline Martín / 60; (Patricia Arribas) / (76)	199
13	Belgium: Fatiha Baouf / 25; Sigrid van den Bempt / 39; Stefanija Statkuvienė / 65; Kim Offergeld / 74; (Nathalie Deroubaix) / (81); (Corinne Debaets) / (87)	203
14	Ecuador: María Paredes / 40; Silvia Paredes / 80; Marlene Acuña / 82; Narcisa Calderón / 93; (Wilma Guerra) / (104)	295
15	Brazil: Ednalva da Silva / 58; Célia dos Santos / 86; Ana de Souza / 91; Jocinalva Valentim / 103	338
16	Belarus: Anna Kotenkova / 70; Krystina Kirova / 97; Tatyana Tratsyuk / 98; Natalya Ilyashuk / 99	364
17	India: Madhuri Saxena / 84; Madhuri Gurnule / 95; Platima Bhandari / 96; Renuka Hegde / 101	376
18	Uzbekistan: Yuliya Arfipova / 100; Zamira Amirova / 105; Kamilla Ramazanova / 107; Nargiza Tohtanazarova / 109	421
19	Turkmenistan: Alena Petrova / 110; Rozaliya Zilyayeva / 111; Yevgeniya Balabkina / 112; Lyudmila Polatova / 113	446

- Note: Athletes in parentheses did not score for the team result

== Participation ==
An unofficial count yields the participation of 114 athletes from 34 countries in the Women's short race. This is in agreement with the official numbers as published. The announced athlete from Austria did not show.

- Australia (1)
- Belarus (4)
- Belgium (6)
- Bolivia (1)
- Brazil (4)
- Canada (5)
- Ecuador (5)
- Ethiopia (6)
- India (4)
- Ireland (5)
- Italy (1)
- Japan (1)
- Kenya (6)
- Lebanon (2)
- Mexico (1)
- Morocco (5)
- Netherlands (1)
- Portugal (6)
- Romania (6)
- Russia (4)
- South Africa (1)
- Spain (5)
- Eswatini (1)
- Switzerland (1)
- Tajikistan (1)
- Tanzania (6)
- Tunisia (2)
- Turkmenistan (4)
- Ukraine (1)
- United Kingdom (6)
- United States (6)
- Uzbekistan (4)
- Yugoslavia (1)
- Zimbabwe (1)

== See also ==
- 2001 IAAF World Cross Country Championships – Senior men's race
- 2001 IAAF World Cross Country Championships – Men's short race
- 2001 IAAF World Cross Country Championships – Junior men's race
- 2001 IAAF World Cross Country Championships – Senior women's race
- 2001 IAAF World Cross Country Championships – Junior women's race
