= Brahim Jabbour =

Moroccan long-distance runner

Medal record

Men's athletics

World Indoor Championships
Bronze medal – third place	1995 Barcelona	3000 m

World Cross Country Championships
Silver medal – second place	1998 Marrakesh	Short race – Team

Brahim Jabbour (born 2 October 1970) is a Moroccan retired long-distance runner. He specialized in the 5000 metres.

Jabbour finished sixth in the 5000 metres at the 1993 World Championships, won the bronze medal at the 1994 Jeux de la Francophonie, and the bronze medal in 3000 metres at the 1995 World Indoor Championships.

At the Jeux de la Francophonie, Jabbour finished behind countryfellows Salah Hissou and Brahim Lahlafi; this was one of three all-Moroccan podiums in this event at the Jeux de la Francophonie (the other being 1989: Saïd Aouita, Khalid Skah, Mohamed Issangar and 2001: Mohamed Amine, Abderrahim Goumri, Mohamed Saïd El Wardi). Jabbour benefited from the breadth in Moroccan running at the 1998 World Cross Country Championships, when he finished fifteenth in the short race and won a silver medal in the team competition. He also competed at the 1999 World Championships, but failed to reach the 5000 metres final.

His personal best times were 7:35.92 minutes in the 3000 metres, achieved in July 1999 in Paris; 13:01.41 minutes in the 5000 metres, achieved in July 1999 in Saint-Denis; and 1.01:51 hours in the half marathon, achieved in September 1997 in Lille.
