= Cheptigit =

Village in Rift Valley Province, Kenya

Cheptigit is a village near Kaptagat in the Uasin Gishu District, Rift Valley Province, Kenya. It has a primary school named Cheptigit Primary School Belgut.

It is the birthplace of Kenyan runner Richard Limo.
