= Nicholas Rogers (runner) =

American long-distance runner

Personal information
- Nickname: Nick
- Born: May 2, 1975 (age 51) Seattle, Washington, U.S.

Sport
- Country: United States
- Sport: Athletics
Medal record
World Cross Country Championships
Bronze medal – third place	2001 Ostend	Team

Nicholas "Nick" Rogers (born May 2, 1975) is a retired American long-distance runner.

He competed in the 5000 metres at the 2000 Summer Olympics and the 2001 World Championships without reaching the final. He competed three times at the World Cross Country Championships, in 2000, 2001 and 2003. In 2001 he won a bronze medal in the team competition.

His personal best times were 7:56.65 minutes in the 3000 metres, achieved in July 2001 in London; 13:18.50 minutes in the 5000 metres, achieved in August 2000 in Heusden-Zolder; and 27:55.17 minutes in the 10,000 metres, achieved in May 2000 in Palo Alto.

Rogers was born in Seattle, Washington.
