= Margaret Ngotho =

Kenyan long-distance runner (born 1970)

Medal record

Women's athletics

Representing Kenya

World Cross Country Championships
Bronze medal – third place	2000 Vilamoura	Short race

African Championships
Bronze medal – third place	1990 Cairo	1500 m
Bronze medal – third place	1990 Cairo	3000 m

Margaret Ngotho (born 25 June 1970) is a Kenyan former long-distance runner who competed in cross-country running and track events. Her highest achievement was a bronze medal in the short race at the IAAF World Cross Country Championships in 2000. She was three times a team medalist at the competition for Kenya, winning gold in 1991 and 1995 then finally silver in 2001.

She was a double bronze medallist at the African Championships in Athletics in 1990, running the 3000 metres and the 1500 metres. She was a three-time Kenyan champion, winning at both track distances and once in short cross country.

== Career ==
Ngotho made her first international appearance at the 1988 IAAF World Cross Country Championships, but was by far the slowest Kenyan performer in 96th place. She rose to prominence at the 1990 African Championships in Athletics where she was the double bronze medallist in the 1500 metres and 3000 metres. She was the Kenyan champion in both those events that year. Her first medal on the global stage followed at the 1991 IAAF World Cross Country Championships and her eighth-place finish brought her a gold medal with the Kenyan women's team (which included namesake Jane Ngotho, Susan Sirma and Pauline Konga).

Ngotho ran on the European road running circuit in the early 1990s and had wins at the 1993 Alsterlauf Hamburg and the 1994 Kerzerslauf. After a win at the Cross Pradelle, she returned to international competition at the 1995 IAAF World Cross Country Championships and her fourth-place finish behind compatriot Sally Barsosio brought her another team gold medal. Running on the track circuit that year she set two lifetime bests: she ran 15:24.53 minutes for the 5000 metres in Hengelo and a 3000 m best of 8:50.09 minutes brought her eighth place at the 1995 IAAF Grand Prix Final in Monaco. She remained a top-ten finisher at European track meets over the next few years.

The introduction of a shorter distance race at the 2000 IAAF World Cross Country Championships played to Ngotho's strengths and, following a win at the Kenyan Cross Country Championships, she had the greatest success of her career in the form of a bronze medal. She was narrowly beaten by both Kutre Dulecha and Zahra Ouaziz in a sprint finish, recording the same time as the other athletes, and just one second ahead of fourth-placed Paula Radcliffe. This performance also coincided with a poor Kenyan team performance in fourth, with Sally Barsosio the only other Kenyan in the top ten. Maintaining her good form, she won the Pune Half Marathon with a best of 68:10 minutes, as well as the Cross Internacional de Soria in November.

A team silver in an Edith Masai-led Kenyan women's team came as part of her final international appearance (and fifth at the tournament) at the 2001 IAAF World Cross Country Championships, where she came tenth. A best in the 10K run followed a month later via a win in Poznań. After a quiet 2002, she was a frequent competitor on the track in Europe in 2003. Highlights included a 1500 m win at the FBK Games and a lifetime best of 4:07.38 minutes for third at the Seville Athletics Grand Prix. She set further bests of 4:32.65 minutes for the mile run and 5:41.02 minutes for the 2000 metres at the Golden Spike Ostrava. There were also top three placings at the Notturna di Milano and Osaka Grand Prix meetings. After lower level performances in 2004, she retired from competition.

== Personal bests ==
- 1500 metres – 4:07.38 min (2003)
- Mile run – 4:32.65 min (2003)
- 2000 metres – 5:41.02 min (2003)
- 3000 metres – 8:50.09 min (1995)
- 5000 metres – 15:24.53 min (1995)
- 10K run – 32:52 min (2001)
- Half marathon – 68:10 min (2000)

== International competitions ==
Year	Competition	Venue	Position	Event	Notes
1988	World Cross Country Championships	Auckland, New Zealand	96th	Senior race	
1990	African Championships	Cairo, Egypt	3rd	1500 metres	
1990	African Championships	Cairo, Egypt	3rd	3000 metres	
1991	World Cross Country Championships	Antwerp, Belgium	9th	Senior race	
1991	World Cross Country Championships	Antwerp, Belgium	1st	Team race	
1995	World Cross Country Championships	Durham, United Kingdom	4th	Senior race	
1995	World Cross Country Championships	Durham, United Kingdom	1st	Team race	
2000	World Cross Country Championships	Vilamoura, Portugal	3rd	Short race	
2000	World Cross Country Championships	Vilamoura, Portugal	4th	Team race	
2001	World Cross Country Championships	Ostend, Belgium	10th	Short race	
2001	World Cross Country Championships	Ostend, Belgium	2nd	Team race	
