= Hailu Mekonnen =

Ethiopian long-distance runner (born 1980)

Medal record

Men's athletics

Representing Ethiopia

World Cross Country Championships
Bronze medal – third place	1999 Belfast	Short race
Bronze medal – third place	2002 Dublin	Short race

All-Africa Games
Gold medal – first place	1999 Johannesburg	1500 m
Silver medal – second place	2003 Abuja	5000 m

African Championships
Silver medal – second place	1998 Dakar	5000 m

Afro-Asian Games
Gold medal – first place	2003 Hyderabad	5000 m

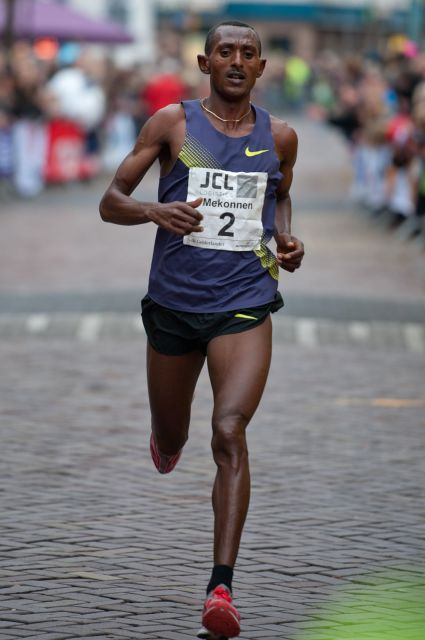

Hailu Mekonnen (born 4 April 1980 in Arsi) is an Ethiopian runner, who specializes in the 5000 metres and cross-country running.

His first medals came in 1998, when he took bronze and team gold at the junior race at the IAAF World Cross Country Championships and won a silver in the 5000 m at the 1998 African Championships in Athletics. With Haile Gebrselassie as his training partner, he continued to improve, winning the junior race and taking bronze in the senior short course for a medalling double at the 1999 World Cross Country Championships. He also won the 1500 metres gold medal at the All-Africa Games that year.

Mekkonen attended the 1999 and 2001 World Championships in Athletics and represented Ethiopia at the 2000 Summer Olympics, but he failed to make the podium at any of the events. His form improved in 2002 and he won the short race bronze and team silver at the World Cross Country Championships. He focused on the track in 5000 m the next year and won the 2003 All-Africa Games silver and the 2003 Afro-Asian Games gold medal. After a long time out of the spotlight of international competition he re-emerged in 2009 after switching to the half marathon and marathon.

== Career ==
Mekonnen came to prominence at the age of eighteen with a silver medal performance in the 5000 m at the 1998 African Championships in Athletics, finishing behind reigning world champion Daniel Komen. He followed this up with a gold and team silver in the junior race and an individual and team bronze medal in the short race at the 1999 IAAF World Cross Country Championships. He put much of his success down to the help he had received from Haile Gebrselassie, who was his training partner and mentor. He ran a world junior record in the 3000 m in Stuttgart, Germany, but this was never ratified as he did not undergo the doping controls necessary for record purposes. He finished seventh in the 5000 m at the 1999 World Championships in Athletics and closed the year with a 1500 metres gold medal at the 1999 All-Africa Games and a win at the Cross Internacional de Venta de Baños. He set an indoor world record of 8:09.66 in the two miles in Birmingham in February. However, Mekonnen only managed sixth place in the short race at the 2000 IAAF World Cross Country Championships, but again he won the team bronze with Ethiopia. He represented his country at the 2000 Summer Olympics, finishing seventh in the semi-finals of the 1500 metres.

Competing at his first IAAF World Indoor Championships, he finished seventh in the final of the 1500 m. After this he decided that he would not succeed over distance and permanently switched to the 5000 m, saying: "That's enough for the 1500. It was tried, it didn't work." Returning to the cross country championships, he improved to win the team silver at the 2001 edition, although he finished tenth overall. He finished eighth in the 5000 m at the 2001 World Championships in Athletics. He was selected for the 2001 IAAF Grand Prix Final, but he only managed eighth place in the 3000 m final. He also took part in the 5000 m at the 2001 Goodwill Games, just missing out on the medals in fourth. He began taking part in road races and won the Memorial Peppe Greco 10 km. He had his best ever cross country result at the 2002 edition in Belfast, winning a bronze medal for himself and helping Ethiopia to the team silver in the short race. He ran in the QSI 10 km and was second behind Haile Gebrselassie who set a world best for the distance.

At the 2003 All-Africa Games, he decided not to defend his 1500 m title and instead opted for the 5000 m and he won the silver medal, just beaten by Kenenisa Bekele. He travelled to Hyderabad in India to compete at the 2003 Afro-Asian Games, where he won the gold in the 5000 m. He took part in the 2003 International Chiba Ekiden and was the fastest runner in the second stage and helped Ethiopia to victory in the fastest ever Ekiden race.

He won the Montferland Run 15 km in 2005.

From 2008 onwards, he began to focus more on road running competitions. After a long absence from major international competition, he signed up for the 2009 IAAF World Half Marathon Championships. However, he failed to finish the race. He finished second at the Great Scottish Run behind Jason Mbote in late 2009. The following year, he took eighth place at the 2010 Paris Marathon and even though he fell over midway through the race, he recovered to set a personal best of 2:09:01. Further improvement came at the Amsterdam Marathon where, despite finishing in fifth, he ran almost a minute and a half faster than his previous best by completing the race in 2:07:37.

He cut another two seconds off his best with his winning time at the 2011 Tokyo Marathon in February. He was runner-up at the Montferland Run that year, being beaten to the title by Philip Langat. He returned to defend his title at the 2012 Tokyo Marathon, but could manage only eighth place on that occasion. on 22 September 2012 he won the heng shui marathon in 2:08.05

== Personal bests ==
- 1500 metres - 3:33.14 (2000)
- One mile - 3:53.40 (2000)
- 3000 metres - 7:30.53 (2001)
- 5000 metres - 12:58.57 (2001)
- 10,000 metres - 28:01.10 (2002)
- Half marathon - 1:01:29 (2009)
- Marathon - 2:07:35 (2011)

== Achievements ==
Year	Competition	Venue	Position	Event	Notes
Representing Ethiopia
1998	World Cross Country Championships	Marrakesh, Morocco	3rd	Junior race (8 km)	22:51
1998	World Cross Country Championships	Marrakesh, Morocco	1st	Junior team competition	16 pts
1998	World Junior Championships	Annecy, France	5th	5000 m	14:06.30
1998	African Championships	Dakar, Senegal	2nd	5000 m	13:38.19
1999	World Cross Country Championships	Belfast, United Kingdom	3rd	Short race (4.236 km)	12:35
1999	World Cross Country Championships	Belfast, United Kingdom	3rd	Team competition	55 pts
1999	World Cross Country Championships	Belfast, United Kingdom	1st	Junior race (8.012 km)	25:38
1999	World Cross Country Championships	Belfast, United Kingdom	2nd	Junior team competition	24 pts
1999	World Championships	Seville, Spain	7th	5000 m	13:18.97
1999	All-Africa Games	Johannesburg, South Africa	1st	1500 m	3:39.73
2000	World Cross Country Championships	Vilamoura, Portugal	6th	Short race (4.18 km)	11:27
2000	World Cross Country Championships	Vilamoura, Portugal	2nd	Team competition	46 pts
2000	Summer Olympics	Sydney, Australia	7th (semis)	1500 m	3:40.92
2001	World Indoor Championships	Lisbon, Portugal	7th	1500 m	3:52.72
2001	World Cross Country Championships	Ostend, Belgium	10th	Short race (4.1 km)	13:03
2001	World Cross Country Championships	Ostend, Belgium	2nd	Team competition	51 pts
2001	World Championships	Edmonton, Canada	8th	5000 m	13:20.24
2001	Goodwill Games	Brisbane, Australia	4th	5000 m	15:26.70
2002	World Cross Country Championships	Dublin, Ireland	3rd	Short race (4.208 km)	12:20
2002	World Cross Country Championships	Dublin, Ireland	2nd	Team competition	32 pts
2003	All-Africa Games	Abuja, Nigeria	2nd	5000 m	13:26.73
2003	Afro-Asian Games	Hyderabad, India	1st	5000 m	13:49.08
2009	World Half Marathon Championships	Birmingham, United Kingdom	—	Half marathon	DNF
2010	Barcelona Marathon	Barcelona, Spain	9th	Marathon	2:12:36
2010	Paris Marathon	Paris, France	8th	Marathon	2:09:01
2010	Amsterdam Marathon	Amsterdam, Netherlands	5th	Marathon	2:07:37
2011	Tokyo Marathon	Tokyo, Japan	1st	Marathon	2:07:35
2012	Tokyo Marathon	Tokyo, Japan	8th	Marathon	2:09:59
2012	Hengshui Lake International Marathon	Hengshui, China	1st	Marathon	2:08:07
2013	Dubai Marathon	Dubai, United Arab Emirates	23rd	Marathon	2:15:22
2014	Mumbai Marathon	Mumbai, India	8th	Marathon	2:12:17
2015	Tiberias Marathon	Sea of Galilee, Israel	1st	Marathon	2:12:32

Sporting positions
Preceded by (Algeria) Ali Saïdi-Sief	Men's 3000 m Best Year Performance; 2001	Succeeded by (Kenya) Benjamin Limo
