= Khoudir Aggoune =

Algerian long-distance runner

Khoudir Aggoune (born 5 January 1981 in Souk El-Thenine, Béjaïa Province) is an Algerian long-distance runner who specializes in the 5000 metres. He competed at the 2004 Summer Olympics in the 5000m metres and came 10th in his heat with a time of 13:29.37, he didn't advance to the next stage.

== Achievements ==
Year	Competition	Venue	Position	Event	Notes
Representing Algeria
2000	World Junior Championships	Santiago, Chile	6th	5000 m	14:01.16
2001	World Championships	Edmonton, Canada	20th (h)	5000 m	13:43.95
2001	Mediterranean Games	Radès, Tunisia	6th	5000 m	14:10.08
2002	African Championships	Radès, Tunisia	4th	5000 m	13:34.96
2003	World Indoor Championships	Birmingham, United Kingdom	13th (h)	3000 m	7:54.59
2003	World Championships	Paris, France	20th (h)	5000 m	13:56.41
2003	All-Africa Games	Abuja, Nigeria	8th	5000 m	13:53.15
2004	World Indoor Championships	Budapest, Hungary	18th (h)	3000 m	7:55.94
2004	Olympic Games	Athens, Greece	21st (h)	5000 m	13:29.37
2004	World Athletics Final	Monte Carlo, Monaco	12th	5000 m	13:30.53
2004	Pan Arab Games	Algiers, Algeria	1st	5000 m	13:24.73
2005	Islamic Solidarity Games	Mecca, Saudi Arabia	2nd	5000 m	14:11.32
2005	Mediterranean Games	Almería, Spain	3rd	5000 m	13:30.54
2006	African Championships	Bambous, Mauritius	8th	5000 m	14:10.06
2007	All-Africa Games	Algiers, Algeria	8th	5000 m	13:25.91
2007	World Championships	Osaka, Japan	17th (h)	5000 m	13:47.36
2007	Pan Arab Games	Cairo, Egypt	4th	5000 m	13:43.03
2007	Pan Arab Games	Cairo, Egypt	4th	10,000 m	29:30.14

=== Personal bests ===
- 1500 metres - 3:38.58 min (2006)
- 3000 metres - 7:43.63 min (2003)
- 5000 metres - 13:10.16 min (2006)
- 10000 meters- 27:58.03 min (2008),(NR)
