= Mohammed Amyn =

Moroccan long-distance runner

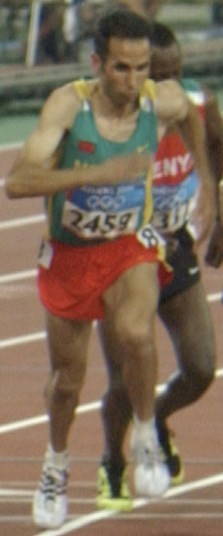
- Mohammed Amyn at the 2004 Olympic Games

Medal record

Men's athletics

Representing Morocco

African Championships
Bronze medal – third place	2002 Radès	5000 m

Mohammed Amyn (Arabic: محمد أمين) (also written Amine, born 25 March 1976) is a Moroccan long-distance runner.

== International competitions ==
Year	Competition	Venue	Position	Event	Notes
Representing Morocco
1997	Jeux de la Francophonie	Antananarivo, Madagascar	1st	5000 m	
1999	World Cross Country Championships	Belfast, United Kingdom	10th	Short race	
1999	World Cross Country Championships	Belfast, United Kingdom	2nd	Team	
2001	World Cross Country Championships	Ostend, Belgium	16th	Short race	
2001	World Cross Country Championships	Ostend, Belgium	2nd	Team	
2001	World Championships	Edmonton, Canada	12th	5000 m	
2001	Mediterranean Games	Radès, Tunisia	2nd	5000 m	
2002	African Championships	Radès, Tunisia	3rd	5000 m	
2004	World Indoor Championships	Budapest, Hungary	8th	3000 m	
2004	Olympic Games	Athens, Greece	18th	10,000 m	
2004	World Athletics Final	Monte Carlo, Monaco	11th	3000 m	
2005	Mediterranean Games	Almería, Spain	1st	10,000 m	
2005	World Championships	Helsinki, Finland	DNF	5000 m	
2009	Mediterranean Games	Pescara, Italy	2nd	10,000 m	

== Personal bests ==
- 1500 metres - 3:34.81 min (1999)
- 3000 metres - 7:35.35 min (2001)
- 5000 metres - 13:01.98 min (2002)
- 10,000 metres - 27:22.67 min (2005)
- Half marathon - 1:01:31 hrs (2006)
