= Paulo Gomes (athlete) =

Portuguese marathon runner

Personal information
- Full name: Paulo Jorge Caetano Gomes
- Nationality: Portugal
- Born: 15 May 1973 (age 53) Celorico da Beira, Beira; Interior Norte, Portugal
- Height: 1.73 m (5 ft 8 in)
- Weight: 69 kg (152 lb)

Sport
- Sport: Athletics
- Event: Marathon
- Club: Conforlimpa

Achievements and titles
- Personal bests: Half-marathon: 1:03:00 (2003); Marathon: 2:12:51 (2007)

Paulo Jorge Caetano Gomes (born 15 May 1973 in Celorico da Beira, Beira Interior Norte) is a Portuguese marathon runner. He set a personal best time of 2:12:51, by finishing third at the 2007 Volkswagen Marathon in Prague, Czech Republic.

At age thirty-five, Gomes made his official debut for the 2008 Summer Olympics in Beijing, where he competed in the men's marathon, along with his teammate Hélder Ornelas. He successfully finished the race in thirtieth place by four seconds behind Russia's Oleg Kulkov, with a time of 2:18:15.
