= Chepkongony =

Village in Uasin Gishu County, Kenya

Coordinates: 0°10′7″S 35°33′2″E

Chepkongony is a village near Kaptagat in the Uasin Gishu County, Kenya. It is part of Wareng County Council and Eldoret East Constituency.

It is the birthplace of famous runner Benjamin Limo.

There is also village called Chepkongony in Nandi County and Kericho County
