= 2001 IAAF World Cross Country Championships – Junior men's race =

Junior men's race at the 2001 IAAF World Cross Country Championships
- Organisers: IAAF
- Edition: 29th
- Date: March 25
- Host city: Ostend, West Flanders, Belgium
- Venue: Hippodrome Wellington
- Events: 1
- Distances: 7.7 km – Junior men
- Participation: 152 athletes from 38 nations

The Junior men's race at the 2001 IAAF World Cross Country Championships was held at the Hippodrome Wellington in Ostend (Oostende), Belgium, on March 25, 2001. Reports of the event were given in The New York Times, in the Herald, and for the IAAF.

Complete results for individuals, for teams, medallists, and the results of British athletes who took part were published.

== Race results ==
=== Junior men's race (7.7 km) ===
==== Individual ====
Rank	Athlete	Country	Time
1st place, gold medalist(s)	Kenenisa Bekele	Ethiopia	25:04
2nd place, silver medalist(s)	Duncan Lebo	Kenya	25:37
3rd place, bronze medalist(s)	Dathan Ritzenhein	United States	25:46
4	Nicholas Kemboi	Kenya	25:52
5	Matt Tegenkamp	United States	25:55
6	Robert Kipchumba	Kenya	26:00
7	Alemayehu Tedla	Ethiopia	26:02
8	Maregu Zewdie	Ethiopia	26:14
9	Beruk Debrework	Ethiopia	26:15
10	Paul Wakou	Uganda	26:17
11	Jean Baptiste Simukeka	Rwanda	26:22
12	Edwin Koech	Kenya	26:37
13	Wilson Chelal	Kenya	26:43
14	Takashi Otsu	Japan	26:43
15	Aissam Gtaib	Morocco	26:43
16	Johnny Okello	Uganda	26:44
17	Samson Ramadhani	Tanzania	26:44
18	Atif Agebli	Morocco	26:46
19	Francis Musani	Uganda	26:54
20	Tibebu Yenew	Ethiopia	26:54
21	Kiplimo Muneria	Kenya	26:56
22	Adil El Bannouri	Morocco	26:57
23	Moses Mpanga	Uganda	26:58
24	Josh Spiker	United States	27:02
25	Francis Yiga	Uganda	27:04
26	Daniel Andrew Sipe	Tanzania	27:06
27	Ryan Hayden	Canada	27:07
28	Nathan Brannen	Canada	27:08
29	Stephen Rogart	Tanzania	27:08
30	Simon Bairu	Canada	27:15
31	Salah Habib	Algeria	27:16
32	Ali Abdalla	Eritrea	27:18
33	Fekadu Gemeda	Ethiopia	27:24
34	Habtai Kifletsion	Eritrea	27:25
35	Mircea Bogdan	Romania	27:30
36	Keving Tingaud	France	27:31
37	Piet Desmet	Belgium	27:32
38	Bruno Saramago	Portugal	27:33
39	Ian Dobson	United States	27:34
40	Bouazza Saji	Morocco	27:37
41	Salah Juaim	Yemen	27:38
42	Hani Meguellati	Algeria	27:43
43	Patrick Guidera	Ireland	27:48
44	Francis Melo	Chile	27:50
45	Arturo Casado	Spain	27:52
46	Cutbert Nyasango	Zimbabwe	27:52
47	Juan Luis Barrios	Mexico	27:53
48	Philippe Verleyen	Belgium	27:54
49	Anouar Assila	Morocco	27:54
50	Valerio Gulli	Italy	27:56
51	Vladimir Checha	Belarus	27:58
52	Shuichi Fujii	Japan	27:59
53	Ian Hornabrook	Australia	28:00
54	Teshome Woldegaber	Eritrea	28:00
55	Jérôme Collot	Belgium	28:03
56	Nabil Zerrouak	Algeria	28:04
57	Francis Khanje	Malawi	28:05
58	Fernando Fernandes	Brazil	28:05
59	Mo Farah	United Kingdom	28:06
60	Muhammet Matpay	Turkey	28:06
61	Luca Massimino	Italy	28:06
62	Aurelien Demailly	France	28:07
63	Alberto Ramírez	Spain	28:08
64	Henrik Nyström	Sweden	28:10
65	William Harty	Ireland	28:12
66	Liberato Pellecchia	Italy	28:12
67	Carlos Silva	Portugal	28:14
68	Cosimo Caliandro	Italy	28:15
69	Benjamin Barbier	Belgium	28:15
70	Nebay Habtegiorgis	Eritrea	28:16
71	Fernando Cabada Jr.	United States	28:16
72	Antonio Lagares	Spain	28:17
73	Tim Stessens	Belgium	28:17
74	Abram Miya	South Africa	28:18
75	Franck de Almeida	Brazil	28:18
76	Martin Fagan	Ireland	28:19
77	Abdelkader Bakhtache	Algeria	28:22
78	Noel Cutillas	Spain	28:22
79	Selahattin Selçuk	Turkey	28:24
80	Andrew Baddeley	United Kingdom	28:27
81	Abdelatif Chemlal	Morocco	28:30
82	Hakim Mokhtari	France	28:30
83	Sergio Sánchez	Spain	28:31
84	Friedel Maans	South Africa	28:32
85	Kenichi Shiraishi	Japan	28:32
86	Joe Dionne	Canada	28:33
87	Sandile Lembetha	South Africa	28:34
88	Richard Jeremiah	Australia	28:35
89	Javier Guerra	Spain	28:37
90	Cristian Gaeta	Italy	28:37
91	Yoshiyuki Tatsuta	Japan	28:39
92	Germán Sánchez	Chile	28:40
93	Matt Maline	United States	28:42
94	Sean Connolly	Ireland	28:45
95	Adam Bowden	United Kingdom	28:45
96	Luigi La Bella	Italy	28:47
97	Abdulaziz Ali Abdulaziz	Yemen	28:48
98	Paul Shaw	United Kingdom	28:49
99	Hicham Chahib	France	28:50
100	Pieter Sollier	Belgium	28:50
101	Serdar Durer	Turkey	28:51
102	Arnoud Okken	Netherlands	28:58
103	Luke Taylor	Australia	29:01
104	Brandon Young	Canada	29:02
105	José Luis Santos	Mexico	29:03
106	Brad Dyson	Australia	29:09
107	George Mkupatira	Malawi	29:11
108	Abdurrahman Kara	Turkey	29:12
109	Andrey Anisimov	Belarus	29:12
110	Diarmuid Grant	Ireland	29:13
111	Arturo Merced	Mexico	29:13
112	Watson Magobo	Malawi	29:15
113	Abdelmoumene Bouchicha	Algeria	29:18
114	Muresh Kumar Yadav	India	29:18
115	Moses Faku	South Africa	29:20
116	Date Mteketa	Malawi	29:20
117	Mohammed Al-Nehmi	Yemen	29:22
118	Steven Ablitt	United Kingdom	29:24
119	Igor Daronin	Belarus	29:25
120	Luis Gamin	Chile	29:34
121	Naoto Kato	Japan	29:35
122	Naoki Shibata	Japan	29:47
123	Jacob Selebalo	South Africa	29:51
124	Ed Jackson	United Kingdom	29:54
125	Dharmender Kumar	India	29:56
126	Pavel Somich	Belarus	30:06
127	Michael Sanchez	Gibraltar	30:07
128	Sebastián Pino	Chile	30:15
129	Cláudio da Cruz	Brazil	30:15
130	Jeremy Valat	France	30:21
131	Ahmed Nasr Ali Al-Ragami	Yemen	30:24
132	Azeet Kumar	India	30:38
133	Jahongir Tolibjonov	Uzbekistan	30:43
134	Meretdurdy Kereguliev	Turkmenistan	30:47
135	Nozimjon Irmatov	Tajikistan	30:57
136	Kenneth Otarola	Costa Rica	31:03
137	Nurridin Irmatov	Tajikistan	31:06
138	Rasul Saydaliyev	Uzbekistan	31:28
139	Rustam Irmatov	Tajikistan	31:48
140	Khodor Abdou	Lebanon	31:55
141	Ruslan Kurbanov	Turkmenistan	31:56
142	Kamoliddin Fakhritdinov	Tajikistan	32:06
143	Vadim Bezyanov	Uzbekistan	32:23
144	Suleyman Jumakuliyev	Turkmenistan	32:35
145	Jacques Francis	Lebanon	32:49
146	Salimjan Yangibayev	Turkmenistan	32:54
147	Dominic Carroll	Gibraltar	34:34
148	Sarvar Akhmatov	Uzbekistan	35:47
149	Lee Taylor	Gibraltar	35:47
—	Noureddine Athamna	Algeria	DNF
—	Cleyton Aguiar	Brazil	DNF
—	Suresh Kumar Yadav	India	DNF
—	Nigel Wray	Canada	DNS
—	Phaustin Baha Sulle	Tanzania	DNS

==== Teams ====
Rank	Team	Points
1st place, gold medalist(s)	Kenya: Duncan Lebo / 2; Nicholas Kemboi / 4; Robert Kipchumba / 6; Edwin Koech / 12; (Wilson Chelal) / (13); (Kiplimo Muneria) / (21)	24
2nd place, silver medalist(s)	Ethiopia: Kenenisa Bekele / 1; Alemayehu Tedla / 7; Maregu Zewdie / 8; Beruk Debrework / 9; (Tibebu Yenew) / (20); (Fekadu Gemeda) / (33)	25
3rd place, bronze medalist(s)	Uganda: Paul Wakou / 10; Johnny Okello / 16; Francis Musani / 19; Moses Mpanga / 23; (Francis Yiga) / (25)	68
4	United States: Dathan Ritzenhein / 3; Matt Tegenkamp / 5; Josh Spiker / 24; Ian Dobson / 39; (Fernando Cabada Jr.) / (71); (Matt Maline) / (93)	71
5	Morocco: Aissam Gtaib / 15; Atif Agebli / 18; Adil El Bannouri / 22; Bouazza Saji / 40; (Anouar Assila) / (49); (Abdelatif Chemlal) / (81)	95
6	Canada: Ryan Hayden / 27; Nathan Brannen / 28; Simon Bairu / 30; Joe Dionne / 86; (Brandon Young) / (104)	171
7	Eritrea: Ali Abdalla / 32; Habtai Kifletsion / 34; Teshome Woldegaber / 54; Nebay Habtegiorgis / 70	190
8	Algeria: Salah Habib / 31; Hani Meguellati / 42; Nabil Zerrouak / 56; Abdelkader Bakhtache / 77; (Abdelmoumene Bouchicha) / (113); (Noureddine Athamna) / (DNF)	206
9	Belgium: Piet Desmet / 37; Philippe Verleyen / 48; Jérôme Collot / 55; Benjamin Barbier / 69; (Tim Stessens) / (73); (Pieter Sollier) / (100)	209
10	Japan: Takashi Otsu / 14; Shuichi Fujii / 52; Kenichi Shiraishi / 85; Yoshiyuki Tatsuta / 91; (Naoto Kato) / (121); (Naoki Shibata) / (122)	242
11	Italy: Valerio Gulli / 50; Luca Massimino / 61; Liberato Pellecchia / 66; Cosimo Caliandro / 68; (Cristian Gaeta) / (90); (Luigi La Bella) / (96)	245
12	Spain: Arturo Casado / 45; Alberto Ramírez / 63; Antonio Lagares / 72; Noel Cutillas / 78; (Sergio Sánchez) / (83); (Javier Guerra) / (89)	258
13	Ireland: Patrick Guidera / 43; William Harty / 65; Martin Fagan / 76; Sean Connolly / 94; (Diarmuid Grant) / (110)	278
14	France: Keving Tingaud / 36; Aurelien Demailly / 62; Hakim Mokhtari / 82; Hicham Chahib / 99; (Jeremy Valat) / (130)	279
15	United Kingdom: Mo Farah / 59; Andrew Baddeley / 80; Adam Bowden / 95; Paul Shaw / 98; (Steven Ablitt) / (118); (Ed Jackson) / (124)	332
16	Turkey: Muhammet Matpay / 60; Selahattin Selçuk / 79; Serdar Durer / 101; Abdurrahman Kara / 108	348
17	Australia: Ian Hornabrook / 53; Richard Jeremiah / 88; Luke Taylor / 103; Brad Dyson / 106	350
18	South Africa: Abram Miya / 74; Friedel Maans / 84; Sandile Lembetha / 87; Moses Faku / 115; (Jacob Selebalo) / (123)	360
19	Chile: Francis Melo / 44; Germán Sánchez / 92; Luis Gamin / 120; Sebastián Pino / 128	384
20	Yemen: Salah Juaim / 41; Abdulaziz Ali Abdulaziz / 97; Mohammed Al-Nehmi / 117; Ahmed Nasr Ali Al-Ragami / 131	386
21	Malawi: Francis Khanje / 57; George Mkupatira / 107; Watson Magobo / 112; Date Mteketa / 116	392
22	Belarus: Vladimir Checha / 51; Andrey Anisimov / 109; Igor Daronin / 119; Pavel Somich / 126	405
23	Tajikistan: Nozimjon Irmatov / 135; Nurridin Irmatov / 137; Rustam Irmatov / 139; Kamoliddin Fakhritdinov / 142	553
24	Uzbekistan: Jahongir Tolibjonov / 133; Rasul Saydaliyev / 138; Vadim Bezyanov / 143; Sarvar Akhmatov / 148	562
25	Turkmenistan: Meretdurdy Kereguliev / 134; Ruslan Kurbanov / 141; Suleyman Jumakuliyev / 144; Salimjan Yangibayev / 146	565
DNF	Brazil: (Fernando Fernandes) / (58); (Franck de Almeida) / (75); (Cláudio da Cruz) / (129); (Cleyton Aguiar) / (DNF)	DNF
DNF	India: (Muresh Kumar Yadav) / (114); (Dharmender Kumar) / (125); (Azeet Kumar) / (132); (Suresh Kumar Yadav) / (DNF)	DNF

- Note: Athletes in parentheses did not score for the team result

== Participation ==
An unofficial count yields the participation of 152 athletes from 38 countries in the Junior men's race. This is in agreement with the official numbers as published.

- Algeria (6)
- Australia (4)
- Belarus (4)
- Belgium (6)
- Brazil (4)
- Canada (5)
- Chile (4)
- Costa Rica (1)
- Eritrea (4)
- Ethiopia (6)
- France (5)
- Gibraltar (3)
- India (4)
- Ireland (5)
- Italy (6)
- Japan (6)
- Kenya (6)
- Lebanon (2)
- Malawi (4)
- Mexico (3)
- Morocco (6)
- Netherlands (1)
- Portugal (2)
- Romania (1)
- Rwanda (1)
- South Africa (5)
- Spain (6)
- Sweden (1)
- Tajikistan (4)
- Tanzania (3)
- Turkey (4)
- Turkmenistan (4)
- Uganda (5)
- United Kingdom (6)
- United States (6)
- Uzbekistan (4)
- Yemen (4)
- Zimbabwe (1)

== See also ==
- 2001 IAAF World Cross Country Championships – Senior men's race
- 2001 IAAF World Cross Country Championships – Men's short race
- 2001 IAAF World Cross Country Championships – Senior women's race
- 2001 IAAF World Cross Country Championships – Women's short race
- 2001 IAAF World Cross Country Championships – Junior women's race
