= Mauricio Díaz =

Chilean long-distance runner

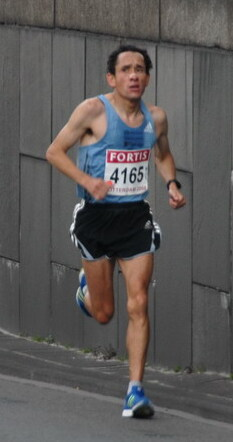
- Díaz in the 2008 Rotterdam Marathon

Personal information
- Born: August 7, 1968 (age 57)

Sport
- Sport: Track and field

Mauricio Hernán Díaz Castro (born August 7, 1968) is a retired long-distance runner from Chile. He represented his native country at the 2000 Summer Olympics in Sydney, Australia. On September 22, he achieved his personal best performance there in the men's 10,000 metres, finishing at a time of 28:05.61.

== Achievements ==
Year	Competition	Venue	Position	Notes
Representing Chile
1999	World Cross Country Championships	Belfast, Northern Ireland	32nd	Long Race
2000	World Cross Country Championships	Vilamoura, Portugal	36th	Long Race
2001	World Cross Country Championships	Ostend, Belgium	31st	Long Race
2002	World Cross Country Championships	Dublin, Ireland	38th	Long Race
2003	Pan American Games	Santo Domingo, Dominican Republic	5th	5,000 m
2004	World Cross Country Championships	Brussels, Belgium	41st	Long Race
2005	World Cross Country Championships	Saint-Étienne, France	40th	Long Race
