= Shashi Prakash =

Indian politician

Shashi Prakash is an Indian politician belonging to the Janta Dal Party. He was the member of Lok Sabha from the Chail constituency in Uttar Pradesh. He has been a Member of parliament thrice in 1991. He is son of Late Sri Masuriya Din who had been Member of parliament from 1952 to 1976 (four times) as Indian National Congress Party.
