= Enock Koech =

Kenyan long-distance runner (born 1981)

Enock Koech (born 4 April 1981) is a Kenyan long-distance runner. At the 2001 World Cross Country Championships he won the short race, while the Kenyan team of which he was a part won the team competition as well.
