= Sander Schutgens =

Dutch long-distance runner

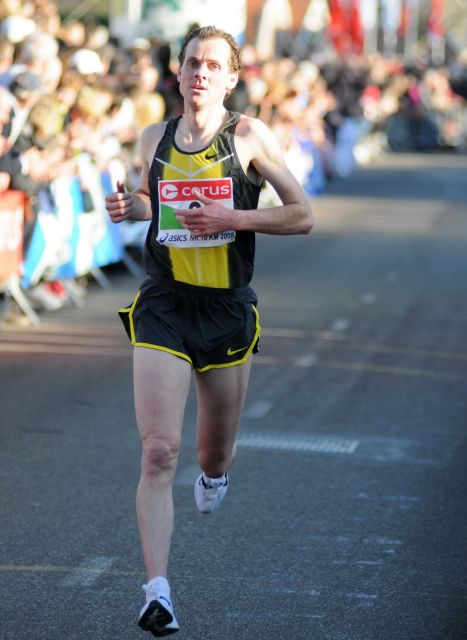
Sander Schutgens

Sander Schutgens (born 31 December 1975 in Belfeld, Limburg) is a Dutch runner.

== Career highlights ==
European Championships
2006 - Gothenburg, 3rd, marathon nation classification
-(with Hugo van den Broek, Luc Krotwaar and Kamiel Maase)

Dutch National Championships
1998 - 1st, cross-country, short distance
2000 - 1st, cross-country, short distance
2005 - 1st, 5,000 m
2006 - 1st, 10,000 m

== Personal bests ==
Distance	Mark	Date	Location
1,500 m	3:44.44	13 June 1998	Bern
3,000 m outdoor	7:52.49	18 June 1999	Rhede
3,000 m indoor	7:56.02	6 February 2000	Stuttgart
5,000 m	13:33.28	1 August 1998	Hechtel
10,000 m track	28:36.71	5 June 2006	Neerpelt
10,000 m road	29:01.00	7 September 2003	Düsseldorf
15,000 m	44:28.00	21 November 2004	Nijmegen
10 Eng. Miles	48:22.00	18 September 2005	Zaandam
20,000 m	59:43.00	6 March 2005	Alphen aan den Rijn
Half marathon	1:02.31	19 March 2005	The Hague
Marathon	2:17.11	13 August 2006	Gothenburg
