= Benjamin Limo =

Kenyan track and field athlete

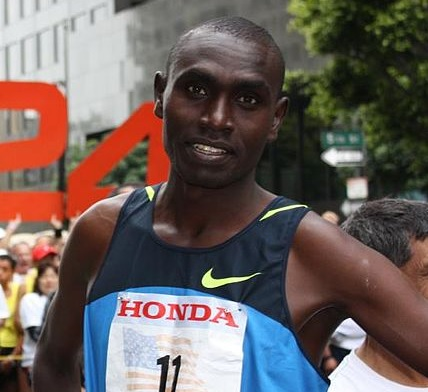

Medal record

Men's athletics

Representing Kenya

World Championships
Gold medal – first place	2005 Helsinki	5000 m
Silver medal – second place	1999 Seville	5000 m

African Championships
Silver medal – second place	2002 Radès	5000 m

Benjamin Kipkoech Limo (born 23 August 1974 in Chepkongony) is a Kenyan former middle- and long-distance runner. His races ranged distances from 1500 m to 10,000 m, but Limo mainly competed in 5000 metres, where he has won international medals.

Limo went to Chebara and Lelboinet High Schools, but enlisted for the Kenyan Army in 1993, without completing his studies. He started full-time training in 1996 and was based at an army camp in Ngong, near capital Nairobi. He competed in his first race abroad at the 1998 IAAF World Cross Country Championships in Marrakesh, Morocco, and finished fourth in the short race.

He earned his first international medals in 1999. Limo won the 1999 World Cross Country Championships and placed second in the 5,000 m at the World Championships, less than one second behind winner Salah Hissou. His silver medal in the 5000 m was earned less than 13 months after he ran his first race at that distance.

In 2002, Limo won silver medals at the Commonwealth Games and at the African Championships. In August 2005 he out-sprinted Sileshi Sihine to become world champion. He won a bronze medal in the 5000 m at the 2006 Commonwealth Games.

Benjamin Limo has never participated in the Olympic Games, due to the rule which allows only three athletes from each nation to participate. His nation Kenya having an abundance of good middle-distance runners, making it is extremely difficult to qualify.

He made his marathon debut in October 2008 finishing 12th at the Amsterdam Marathon.

Limo was awarded the 2005 Kenyan Sportsman of the Year award. He is managed by Ricky Simms.

He is married with four children (as of 2006).

Limo is not related to world champion Richard Limo, but might be distantly related to another Kenyan runner, Felix Limo.

Sporting positions
Preceded by Hailu Mekonnen	Men's 3,000 m Best Year Performance; 2002	Succeeded by Hicham El Guerrouj
