= Mustapha El Ahmadi =

French long-distance runner

Mustapha El Ahmadi (Arabic: مصطفی إل أحمدي; born 8 July 1968) is a French long-distance runner of Moroccan descent.

El Ahmadi was naturalized in November 1999. At the 2001 World Cross Country Championships he finished eleventh in the long race, while the French team of which he was a part won the silver medal in the team competition.
