= Obed Mutanya =

Zambian long distance runner

Personal information
- Nationality: Zambian
- Born: August 10, 1981 (age 44) Chingola, Zambia

Sport
- Sport: Track, Long-distance running
- Events: 5000 meters, 10,000 meters
- College team: Arizona

Achievements and titles
- Personal bests: 1500 meters: 3:44.45; 5000 meters: 13:25.25; 10,000 meters: 29:04.42; Half Marathon: 1:04:26

Obed Mutanya (born 10 August 1981 in Chingola) is a Zambian long-distance and cross country runner. He was a two-time All-American in outdoor track for the University of Arizona and has competed in cross-country and indoor track for the Wildcats. He reached the finals in the 5000 meters at two consecutive NCAA DI Outdoor T&F Championships in 2006 and 2007.

== Running career ==
As a junior, he competed internationally in the 5000 metres, finishing thirteenth at the 1998 World Junior Championships and fourth at the 2000 World Junior Championships. He also competed in the long-race World Cross Country Championships in 2000, 2001, 2002, and 2004, with his best finish being 23rd in 2001.
