= Driss El Himer =

French long-distance runner

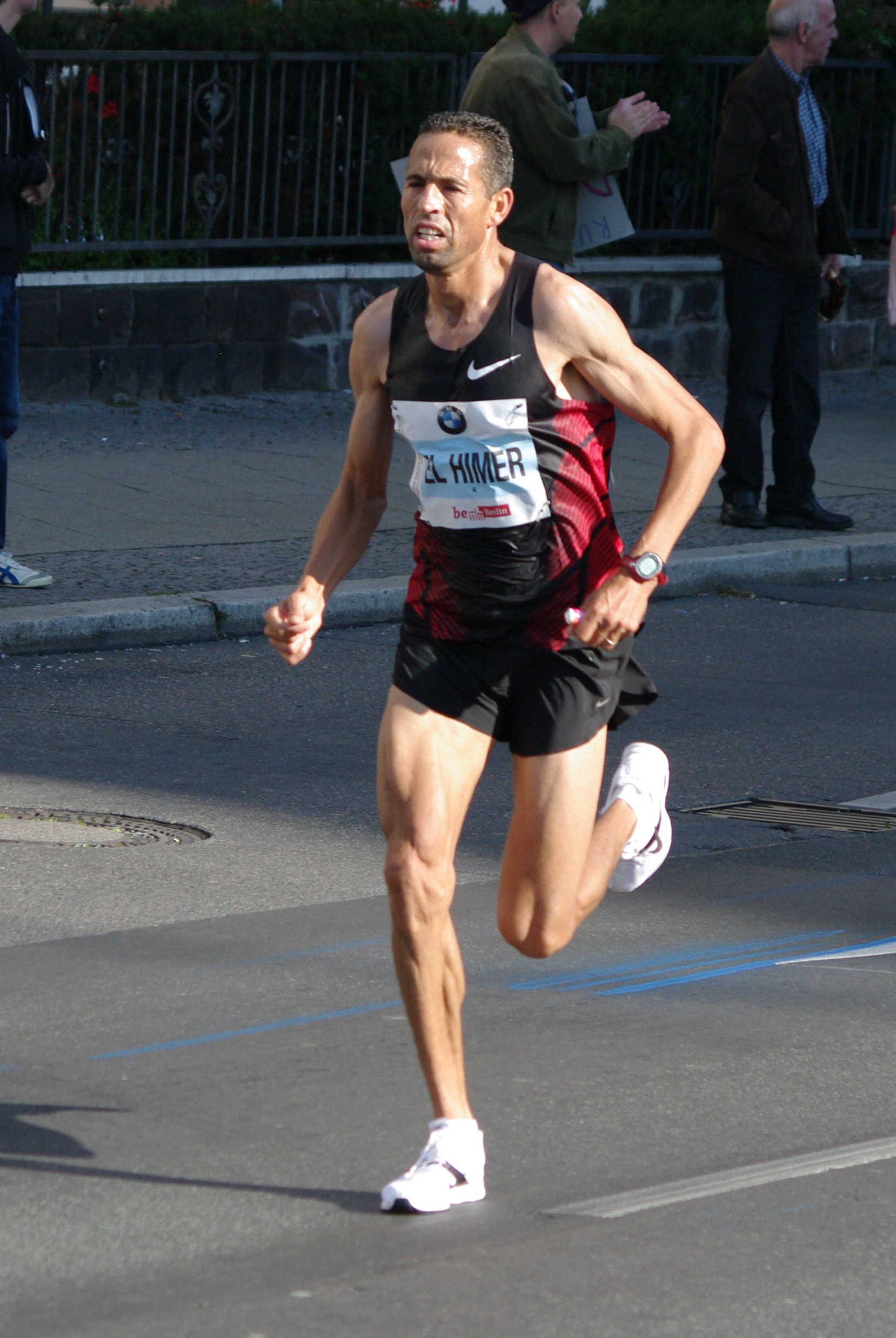
Driss El Himer, Berlin Marathon 2011

Driss El Himer (Arabic: ادريس الهمِر) (born 1 January 1974 in Khezazna, Morocco) is a Moroccan-French long-distance runner. He acquired French nationality by naturalization on 24 January 2001.

He competed in the marathon at the 2004 Olympics, finishing 68th.

He finished 6th in the long race at the 2001 IAAF World Cross Country Championships, 11th in the 5000 m final at the 2001 World Championships in Edmonton, and 8th in the 10,000 m final at the 2006 European Athletics Championships in Gothenburg.

== Achievements ==
Year	Competition	Venue	Position	Event	Notes
Representing France
2001	Amsterdam Marathon	Amsterdam, Netherlands	1st	Marathon	2:07:02
2001	Lille Half Marathon	Lille, France	1st	Half Marathon	1:02:08
2003	World Championships	Paris, France	60th	Marathon	2:24:23
2004	Olympic Games	Athens, Greece	68th	Marathon	2:29:07
