= Richard Limo =

Kenyan long-distance runner

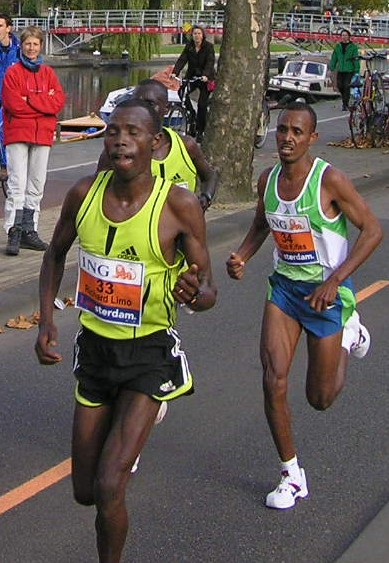
- Limo (left) during the Amsterdam Marathon 2007

Medal record

Men's athletics

Representing Kenya

World Championships
| Gold medal – first place | 2001 Edmonton | 5000 m |

African Championships
| Silver medal – second place | 1998 Dakar | 3000 m st. |

Richard Kipkemei Limo (born 18 November 1980) is a Kenyan athlete. He specializes in long distance track events. He won the 5000 m gold medal at the 2001 World Championships in Athletics.

Limo was born in 1980 in Cheptigit village, Uasin Gishu District. After primary school he went to polytechnic and received a grade in electrical wiring in 1996. He did not start running, until 1997 when he joined a training camp located near his home. The next year he won the silver medal at the junior race of World Cross Country Championships. The same year he broke the world junior record at 3000 m, by running in 7:36.76 minutes, but missed the World Junior Championships. He won the Cross Zornotza in 1999 and the Trofeo Alasport cross country meeting in 2002. In 2001 he became world champion and was world's best performer of the year at 5000 metres with his time 12:56.72, which remains his personal record.

Since 2004 Limo has not been much in the limelight, but has since switched to marathon racing. He won the Giro Media Blenio 10K in 2004. He was the runner-up in the 2007 Amsterdam Marathon, his debut where he consequently set a new personal best (2:06:45).

He won his first marathon race in 2010, running a time of 2:09:56 for victory at the Rock 'n' Roll San Diego Marathon. He slowed to a halt just before the finish line in celebration of his first win over the distance. He finished the 2011 Reims Marathon in third place, finishing behind debutant Demessew Tsega.

Richard Limo is married to Rose Tarus with two children, born in 2000 and 2002. He is 1.67 m tall and has a mass of 52 kg. He is not related to Benjamin Limo or Felix Limo, both also Kenyan runners.

== Achievements ==
| Year | Competition | Venue | Position | Notes |
|---|---|---|---|---|
| 1998 | World Cross Country Championships | Marrakesh, Morocco | 2nd | Junior |
| 1998 | Commonwealth Games | Kuala Lumpur, Malaysia | 3rd | 5000 m |
| 1998 | African Championships | Dakar, Senegal | 2nd | 3000 m st |
| 1999 | World Cross Country Championships | Belfast, United Kingdom | 2nd | Junior |
| 1999 | All-Africa Games | Johannesburg, South Africa | 6th | 5000 m |
| 2000 | Summer Olympics | Sydney, Australia | 10th | 5000 m |
| 2001 | World Cross Country Championships | Ostend, Belgium | 32nd | Long |
| 2001 | World Championships | Edmonton, Canada | 1st | 5000 m |
| 2001 | IAAF Grand Prix Final | Melbourne, Australia | 5th | 5000 m |
| 2002 | World Cross Country Championships | Dublin, Republic of Ireland | 4th | Long |
| 2002 | IAAF Grand Prix Final | Paris, France | 7th | 5000 m |
| 2003 | World Cross Country Championships | Lausanne, Switzerland | 4th | Long |
| 2003 | IAAF World Athletics Final | Monaco | 2nd | 5000 m |
| 2004 | World Cross Country Championships | Brussels, Belgium | 32nd | Long |

=== Marathons ===
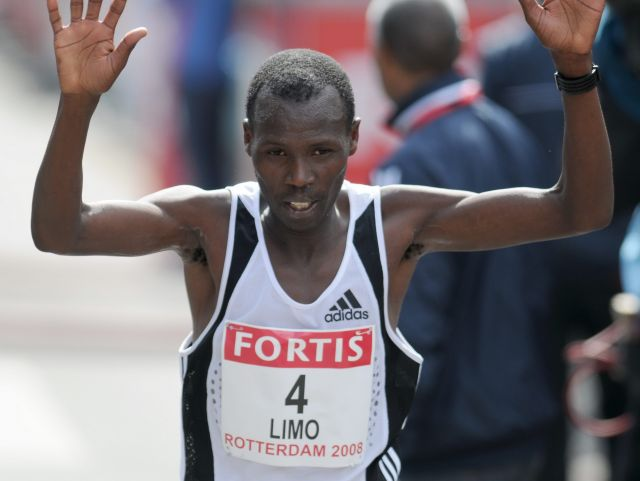
Limo at the 2008 Rotterdam Marathon

- 2007 Amsterdam Marathon – 2nd (PB 2:06:45)
- 2008 Rotterdam Marathon – 4th
- 2008 Chicago Marathon – 10th
- 2009 Rotterdam Marathon – 9th

=== Personal bests ===
- 1500 metres – 3:37.59 min (1999)
- 3000 metres – 7:32.23 min (2001)
- 5000 metres – 12:56.72 min (2001)
- 10,000 metres – 26:50.20 min (2002)
- 3000 metres steeplechase – 8:20.67 min (1998)
- Marathon – 2:06:45 (2007)

Sporting positions
| Preceded by (Morocco) Brahim Lahlafi | Men's 5,000 m Best Year Performance; 2001 | Succeeded by (Morocco) Salah Hissou |
