= Cyrus Kataron =

Kenyan long-distance runner

Cyrus Kataron (born 16 May 1982) is a Kenyan long-distance runner.

He won the bronze medal in 5000 metres at the 2000 World Junior Championships. At the 2001 World Cross Country Championships he finished fifth in the short race, while the Kenyan team of which he was a part won the team competition.
