= Maria Cristina Grosu-Mazilu =

Romanian long-distance runner

Maria Cristina Grosu-Mazilu (born 11 November 1976 in Craiova) is a Romanian long-distance runner.

Over 3000 metres she finished sixth at the 2002 European Indoor Athletics Championships in Vienna and eighth at the 2003 IAAF World Indoor Championships in Birmingham, the latter in an indoor personal best time of 8:51.58 minutes. This is better than her outdoor personal best time of 9:04.91 min, achieved in June 2001 in Bremen.

She also won a silver medal in 1500 metres at the 2001 Summer Universiade. Her personal best time in this event is 4:08.07 min, achieved in June 2004 in Bucharest.
