= Sergio López (sprinter) =

Spanish sprinter (born 1968)

Personal information
- Nationality: Spanish
- Born: 22 July 1968 (age 58) Santa Pola, Spain

Sport
- Sport: Sprinting
- Event: 4 × 100 metres relay

Sergio López Alpáñez (born 22 July 1968) is a Spanish sprinter. He competed in the men's 4 × 100 metres relay at the 1992 Summer Olympics.
