= Larbi Zéroual =

Moroccan long-distance runner

Personal information
- Nationality: Moroccan
- Born: 14 January 1971 (age 55)

Sport
- Sport: Long-distance running
- Event: 10,000 metres

Larbi Zéroual (born 14 January 1971) is a Moroccan long-distance runner. He competed in the men's 10,000 metres at the 1996 Summer Olympics.
