= Hélder Ornelas =

Portuguese long-distance runner

Hélder Mendes Abreu Ornelas (born 6 May 1974 in Nova Lisboa, Angola) is a Portuguese long-distance runner.

He finished eighth in the long race at the 2001 World Cross Country Championships, fifteenth in the marathon at the 2006 European Athletics Championships and won the 2007 edition of the Prague International Marathon. He also won the 2005 Milan Marathon

== Doping ==
In 2012 Ornelas became the first track and field athlete to get suspended for doping based on the biological passport. Accordingly, he received a four-year suspension in May 2012.

== Achievements ==
Year	Competition	Venue	Position	Event	Notes
Representing Portugal
2005	Milan Marathon	Milan, Italy	1st	Marathon	2:10:00
2006	European Championships	Gothenburg, Sweden	15th	Marathon	2:16:03
2007	Prague Marathon	Prague, Czech Republic	1st	Marathon	2:11:49
2007	World Championships	Osaka, Japan	—	Marathon	DNF
2008	Olympic Games	Beijing, PR China	46th	Marathon	2:23:20

== Personal bests ==
- 1500 metres - 3:46.97 min (1996)
- 3000 metres - 7:50.02 min (2000)
- 5000 metres - 13:18.56 min (2000)
- 10,000 metres - 28:01.94 min (2001)
- Half marathon - 1:03:27 hrs (2005)
- marathon - 2:10:00 hrs (2005)

== See also ==
- List of doping cases in sport
