= John Nada Saya =

Tanzanian long-distance runner

John Nada Saya (8 August 1978 – December 2011) was a Tanzanian long-distance runner. He was born in Arusha. He finished fifteenth in the short race at the 2000 World Cross Country Championships. He competed in the marathon race at the 2004 Summer Olympics, but did not finish. He also won the 2001 Milan Marathon, setting a personal best of 2:08:57 hours.

== Achievements ==
- All results regarding marathon, unless stated otherwise

Year	Competition	Venue	Position	Notes
Representing Tanzania
1999	Paris Marathon	Paris, France	12th	2:13:50
2000	Chicago Marathon	Chicago, United States	21st	2:19:00
2001	Milan Marathon	Milan, Italy	1st	2:08:57
2002	Beppu-Ōita Marathon	Beppu-Ōita, Japan	19th	2:21:08
2002	Turin Marathon	Turin, Italy	4th	2:11:12
2002	Fukuoka Marathon	Fukuoka, Japan	6th	2:13:01
2003	World Championships	Paris, France	62nd	2:25:49
2004	Olympic Games	Athens, Greece	—	DNF

== Personal bests ==
- Half Marathon - 1:01:19 hrs (2000)
- Marathon - 2:08:57 hrs (2001)
