= Sammy Kipketer =

Kenyan long-distance runner

Medal record

Men's athletics

Representing Kenya

Commonwealth Games
| Gold medal – first place | 2002 Manchester | 5000 m |

Sammy Kipketer (born 29 September 1981 in Rokocho, Keiyo District) is a Kenyan long-distance runner who specialises in the 5000 metres and cross-country running.

== Career ==
He graduated from Lelboinet Secondary School in 1998. The next year he qualified for the 1999 IAAF World Cross Country Championships, where he finished sixth at the junior race. The Kenyan Army recruited him in 2001.

He now trains with Daniel Komen who was Kenya's foremost runner for a while. Kipketer broke the 3,000m junior world record twice when he was 17. He has also broken the 13-minute barrier for the 5000 metres. He won a 10000 metres in Brussels with his personal record time of 26:49.38. Right now he is focusing on 10-kilometre races.

He holds the 5 kilometres road running world record as recognised by the Association of Road Racing Statisticians (ARRS), while IAAF does not keep a world record over the distance. Kipketer's time, 12:59.5 minutes, was set at the Carlsbad 5000 race in Carlsbad, California in March 2000.

He won the Parelloop 10K in race in the Netherlands in 2001, setting a new world record of 27.18 minutes. Haile Gebrselassie ran the distance in 27:02 minutes in 2002 in Doha, IAAF recognised the time as world record, while ARRS rejected it claiming Gebrselassie got assistance by a vehicle. Thus Kipketer's time is still a valid ARRS world record (as of 2007), although Micah Kogo has since set a better time, still awaiting ratification by ARRS.

Kipketer is managed by Tom Ratcliffe of Kimbia Athletics and coached by Dieter Hogen. He belongs to the Keiyo tribe, a sub-tribe of Kalenjin. He was born in Rokocho, near Kaptarakwa. He is married and has 1 daughter, and he currently lives in Merewet, Uasin Gishu District. He is 1.66 metres tall and has a weight of 52 kg.

== International competitions ==
| Year | Competition | Venue | Position | Event | Notes |
Representing Kenya
| 2000 | World Cross Country Championships | Vilamoura, Portugal | 2nd | Short race | |
| 2001 | World Cross Country Championships | Ostend, Belgium | 4th | Short race | |
| 2001 | World Championships | Edmonton, Canada | 6th | 5000 m | |
| 2002 | World Cross Country Championships | Dublin, Ireland | 4th | Short race | |
| 2002 | Commonwealth Games | Manchester, England | 1st | 5000 m | |
| 2002 | Africa Military Games | Nairobi, Kenya | 1st | 5000 m | |
| 2002 | Africa Military Games | Nairobi, Kenya | 2nd | 10,000 m | |
| 2003 | Military World Games | Catania, Italy | 1st | 5000 m | |
| 2003 | World Athletics Final | Monte Carlo, Monaco | 4th | 5000 m | |
| 2005 | World Athletics Final | Monte Carlo, Monaco | 5th | 5000 m | |

== Personal bests ==
- 3000 metres - 7:33.62 min (2001)
- 5000 metres - 12:52.33 min (2003)
- 10,000 metres - 26:49.38 min (2002)
