= Wirimai Juwawo =

Zimbabwean long-distance runner

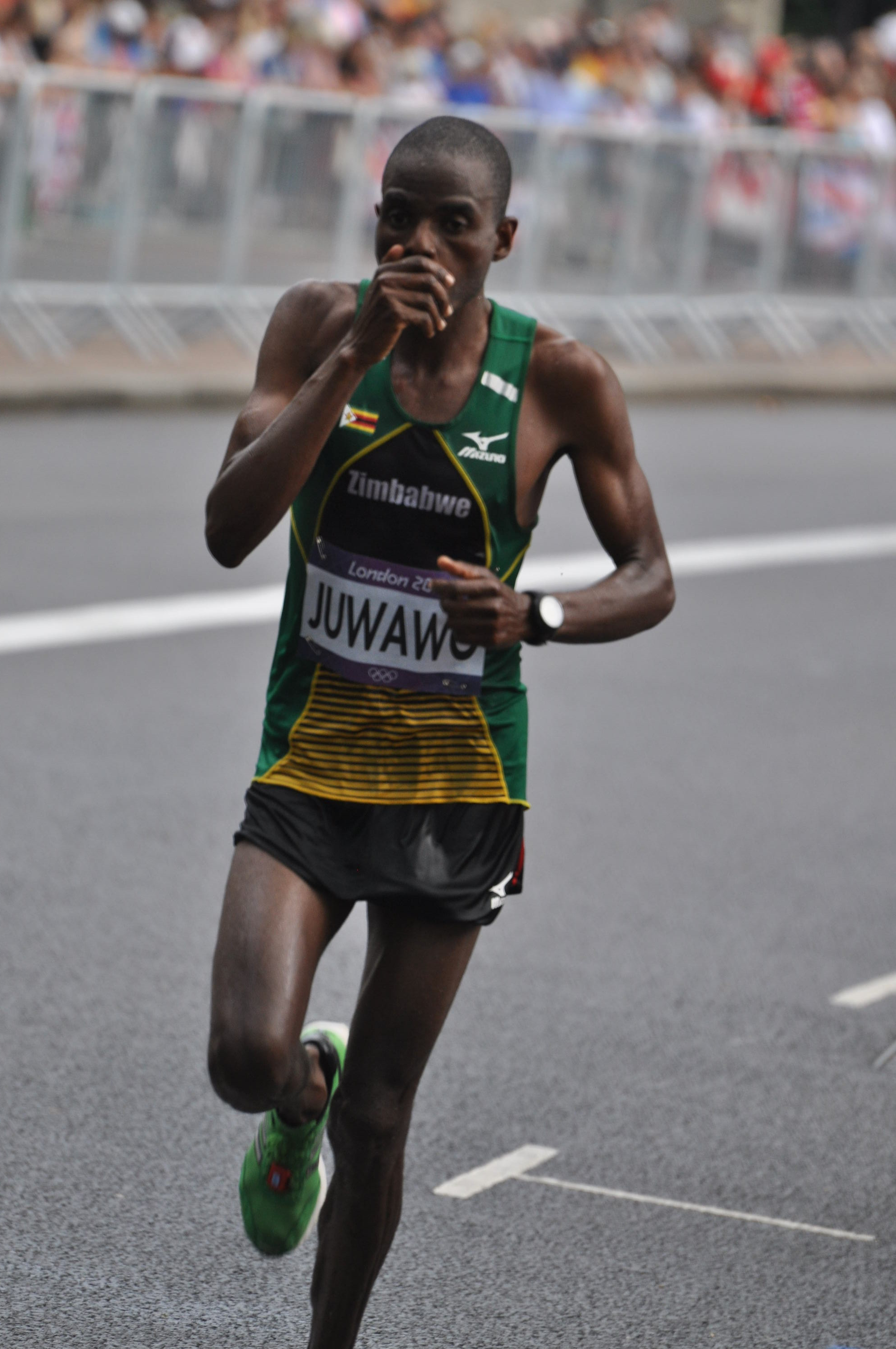
- Juwawo at the 2012 Olympics

Personal information
- Born: November 7, 1980 (age 45) Rusape, Manicaland
- Height: 1.62 m (5 ft 4 in)
- Weight: 64 kg (141 lb)

Sport
- Country: Zimbabwe
- Sport: Athletics
- Event: Marathon

Wirimai Juwawo (born November 7, 1980) is a Zimbabwean long-distance runner. At the 2012 Summer Olympics, he competed in the Men's marathon, finishing in 15th place.
