= Salah Hissou =

Moroccan long-distance runner

Medal record

Men's athletics

Representing Morocco

Olympic Games
Bronze medal – third place	1996 Atlanta	10,000 m

World Championships
Gold medal – first place	1999 Sevilla	5000 m
Bronze medal – third place	1997 Athens	10,000 m

Salaheddine Hissou (Arabic: صلاح حيسو) (born January 16, 1972) is a long-distance runner from Morocco, who won the gold medal over 5000 metres at the 1999 World Championships in Athletics in Seville. With 26:38.08 he also set a world record over 10,000 metres in Brussels in 1996 and won a bronze medal over 10,000 m at the 1996 Summer Olympics in Atlanta.

Hissou was born in Ait Taghia, Kasba Tadla.

Records
Preceded by (Ethiopia) Haile Gebrselassie	Men's 10,000 m World Record Holder; August 23, 1996 – August 4, 1997	Succeeded by (Ethiopia) Haile Gebrselassie
Sporting positions
Preceded by (Kenya) Richard Limo	Men's 5000 m Best Year Performance; 2002	Succeeded by (Kenya) Stephen Cherono
