= Mohamed Saïd El Wardi =

Moroccan athlete (born 1972)

Medal record

Men's athletics

Representing Morocco

African Championships
Bronze medal – third place	2000 Algiers	5000 m

Mohamed Saïd El Wardi (Arabic: محمد سعيد الوردي; born 19 April 1972) is a Moroccan athlete who specializes in the 5000 metres and cross-country running. He was born in Khouribga. He represented his country at the 2000 Summer Olympics.

== International competitions ==
Year	Competition	Venue	Position	Notes
2000	World Cross Country Championships	Vilamoura, Portugal	8th	Short race
2000	World Cross Country Championships	Vilamoura, Portugal	3rd	Team
2000	African Championships	Algiers, Algeria	3rd	5000 m
2001	World Cross Country Championships	Ostend, Belgium	12th	Short race
2001	World Cross Country Championships	Ostend, Belgium	2nd	Team
2001	World Championships	Edmonton, Canada	13th	5000 m
2001	Francophonie Games	Ottawa, Canada	3rd	5000 m
2002	World Cross Country Championships	Dublin, Ireland	12th	Short race

== Personal bests ==
- 1500 metres - 3:34.85 min (2000)
- 3000 metres - 7:34.67 min (2000)
- 5000 metres - 13:04.46 min (2000)
- 10,000 metres - 28:26.25 min (2004)
- Half marathon - 1:01:33 min (2003)
