= Vilamoura Old Course =

Golf course in Vilamoura, Algarve, Portugal

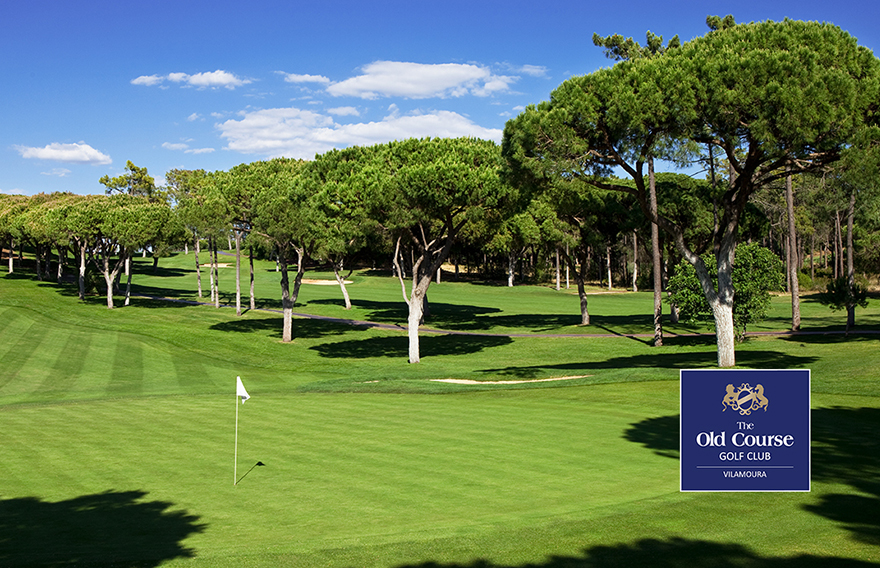
- Interactive map of Vilamoura Old Course
- 37°06′07″N 08°07′05″W

Club information
- Location: Algarve, Portugal
- Established: 1969
- Type: Private
- Operator: Dom Pedro Hotels & Golf Collection
- Tota holes: 18
- Tournaments: Portuguese Open (1979)
- Greens: Bentgrass Providence and Poa annua
- Fairways: Bermuda Tifton 419

Old Course
- Designed by: Frank Pennink (original); Martin Hawtree (1996)
- Par: 73
- Length: 6,254 metres
- Course rating: 73.1
- Slope rating: 136

Vilamoura Old Course is a golf course in Vilamoura, on the Algarve in Southern Portugal. Sometimes referred to as the "Grande Dame" of the Algarve, it is owned and operated by Dom Pedro Hotels & Golf Collection, who purchased the course, along with four others in Vilamoura, in 2016. The five courses had previously been owned by the Oceanico Group since 2007.

Designed by Frank Pennink, the Old Course opened in 1969, and hosted the Portuguese Open in 1976. Following remodelling by Martin Hawtree, the course reopened in 1997.

== Scorecard ==
Vilamoura Old Course (meters)
Tee	Rating/Slope	1	2	3	4	5	6	7	8	9	Out	10	11	12	13	14	15	16	17	18	In	Total
White	73.1 / 136	310	435	324	163	485	212	393	419	265	3006	153	390	487	348	440	150	514	353	413	3248	6254
Yellow		302	417	300	149	449	196	344	400	260	2817	148	371	482	342	426	145	494	348	340	3096	5913
Blue		296	407	290	139	440	181	334	390	250	2727	138	357	472	332	405	135	484	338	330	2991	5718
Red		282	375	252	113	400	164	312	354	245	2497	114	329	359	296	342	106	428	312	303	2589	5086
Par		4	5	4	3	5	3	4	4	4	36	3	4	5	4	5	3	5	4	4	37	73
SI		17	5	9	15	10	11	7	1	13		18	4	6	16	8	14	2	12	3

Vilamoura Old Course (yards)
Tee	Rating/Slope	1	2	3	4	5	6	7	8	9	Out	10	11	12	13	14	15	16	17	18	In	Total
White	73.1 / 136	339	476	354	178	530	232	430	458	290	3287	167	427	533	381	481	164	562	386	452	3552	6839
Yellow		330	456	328	163	491	214	376	437	284	3081	162	406	527	374	466	159	540	381	372	3386	6467
Blue		324	445	317	152	481	198	365	427	273	2982	151	390	516	363	443	148	529	370	361	3271	6253
Red		308	410	276	124	437	179	341	387	268	2731	125	360	393	324	374	116	468	341	331	2831	5562
Par		4	5	4	3	5	3	4	4	4	36	3	4	5	4	5	3	5	4	4	37	73
SI		17	5	9	15	10	11	7	1	13		18	4	6	16	8	14	2	12	3

== See also ==
- List of golf courses in Portugal
