= The Links at Monck's Landing Golf Club =

Public course in Ontario

Coordinates: 44.735542°N 78.846725°W

The Links at Moncks-Landing G.C.
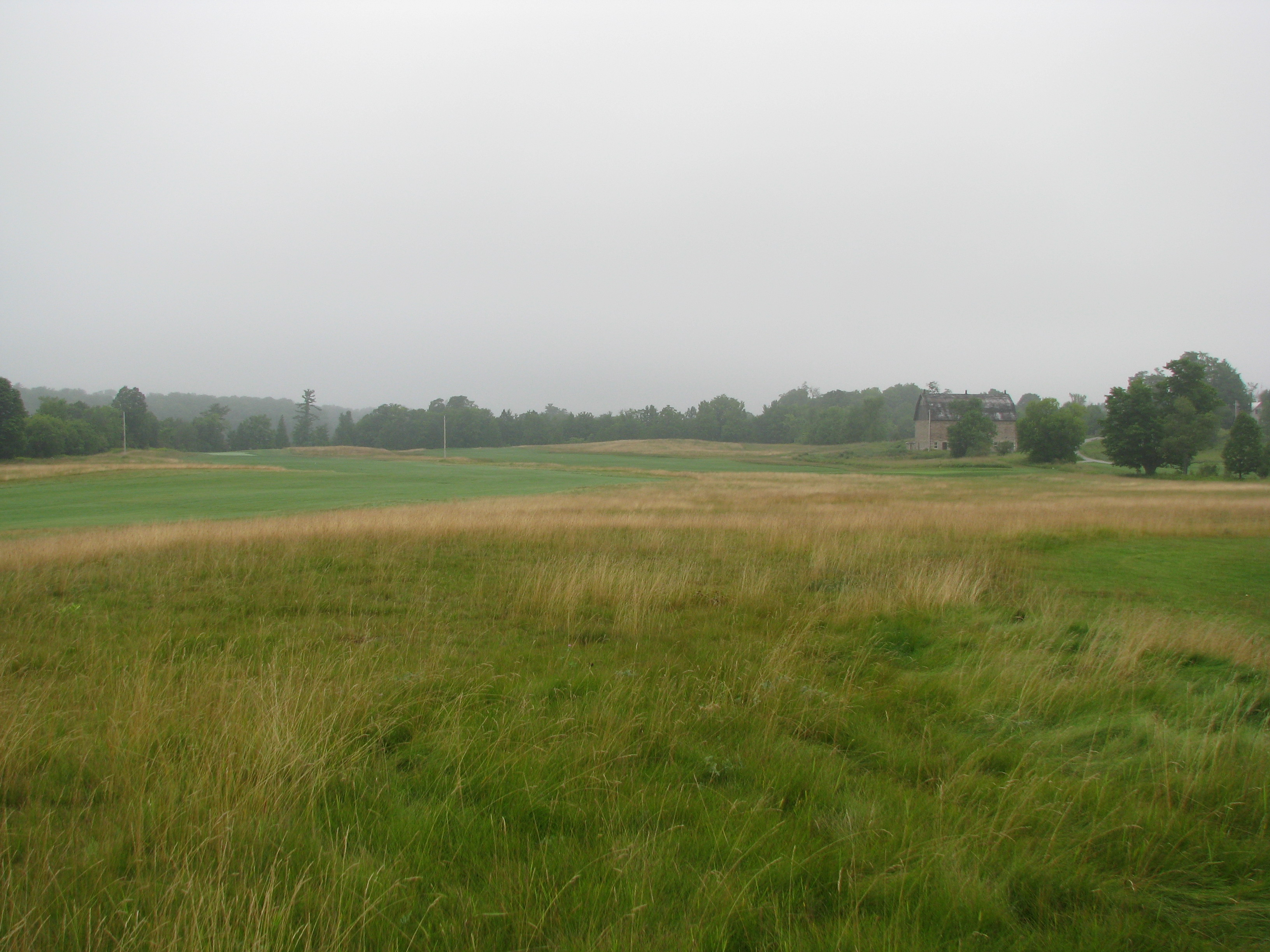
- 8th hole
- Interactive map of The Links at Moncks-Landing G.C.

Club information
- Location: Norland, Ontario (Canada)
- Established: 2008
- Type: Public
- Total holes: 9
- Website: Monck's Landing Website
- Designed by: Scott Kuschnereit
- Par: 35
- Length: 3081 yards

The Links at Monck's Landing Golf Club is a public golf course located in Norland, Ontario, Canada that opened for play in 2008.

== History ==
The 103-acre (42 ha) parcel of land upon which Monck's Landing is situated was homesteaded by Edward Stephens in 1859. Three generations of the Stephens family maintained a working farm on the site until 1961. The farm was considered quite prosperous for the area, being located on a pocket of rich topsoil rarely seen in the region. The property changed hands several times after 1961, until 2009 when it was turned into a golf course. In October 2014, the course went bankrupt. In June 2015 the links was purchased and now the current owners continue to operate The Links at Monck's Landing Golf Club.

== The name ==
The Links at Monck's Landing Golf Club derives its name from the proximity of present-day City of Kawartha Lakes County Road 45, which began its existence as The Monck Road, a former colonization route extending from Lake Couchiching in the west to its eastern terminus in Bancroft. The Monck Road was named after Lord Charles Stanley Monck, the first Governor General of Canada, and was completed in 1873. Monck's Landing is located three kilometres north of the former Monck Road.

== Course description ==
Monck's Landing is a 9-hole course that plays to a par of 35. Currently it measures 3,081 yards from the Blue tees, 2,859 yards from the White tees, and 2,486 yards from the Gold tees. A dual tee block system allows those golfers wishing to play 18 holes a "back 9" that presents a layout both differing and distinct from that experienced the first time around. Monck's Landing bills itself as a links-style layout that utilizes the property's rolling (60-foot change in elevation), treeless terrain, and such features as deep pot bunkers and high fescue rough, to approximate the experience of playing golf on the classic courses of the British Isles. The course has gained the reputation as a challenging layout, having been described as "testing" and "tough as nails" by various golf writers. Monck's Landing has been compared favourably to other inland links courses in Ontario such as Tarandowah in recent golf publications. The Links at Monck's Landing Golf Club was awarded a nomination for "Best New Course in Ontario" by Fairways Magazine in May, 2010, as well being included on columnist Robert Thompson's list of his favourite Canadian "links" and featured in Ontario Golf Magazine's Mid Summer 2010 article "Best Bang For The Buck - There's great golf to be across Ontario for $65 or less". The course also received a favourable review in the Fall 2011 issue of SCOREGolf Magazine, in which it was described as "an affordable and gnarly nine-hole links course with plenty of bite."

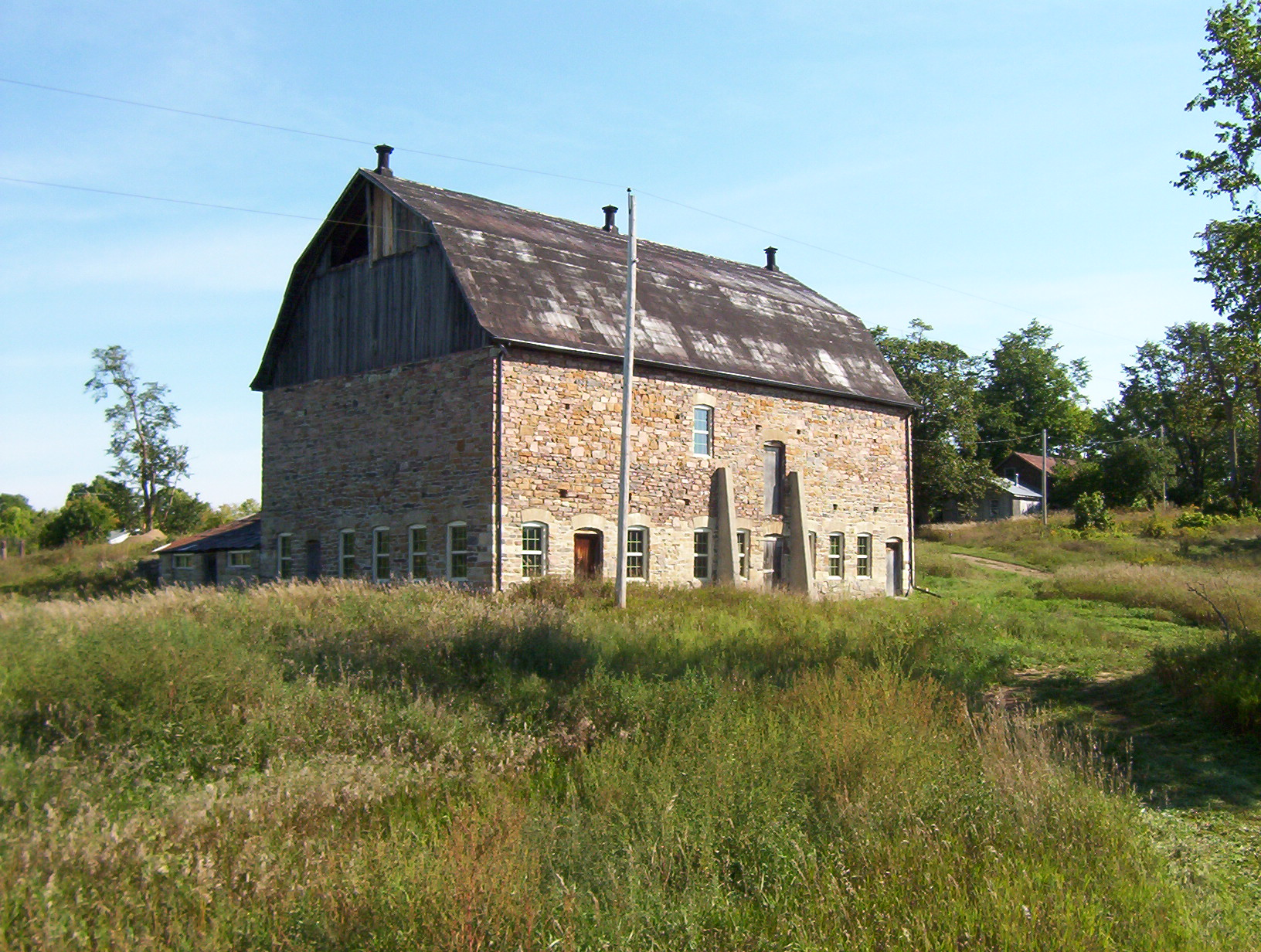
The Stone Barn

== The Stone Barn ==
Situated prominently upon the property is a unique stone barn that is intended to house Monck's Landing's clubhouse in the near future. Built in 1919, with 2-foot-thick (0.61 m) stone walls that extend up to its rafters, this stone barn is considered by some experts to be the only structure of its kind in Ontario.

== Scorecard ==
The Links at Monck's Landing G.C.
HOLE	1	2	3	4	5	6	7	8	9	OUT	10	11	12	13	14	15	16	17	18	IN	TOTAL
PAR	4	4	3	4	3	4	4	5	4	35	4	4	3	4	3	4	4	5	4	35	70
BLUE	325	430	166	355	120	347	374	586	378	3081	325	424	133	355	133	303	374	536	362	2945	6026
WHITE	312	424	161	312	105	325	322	536	362	2859	325	424	133	355	133	303	374	536	362	2945	5804
GOLD	310	343	133	278	92	303	273	443	311	2486	310	343	133	278	92	303	273	443	311	2486	4972
HCP	12	1	14	11	18	8	4	3	6		13	2	16	10	17	15	5	7	9		

== Photo gallery ==
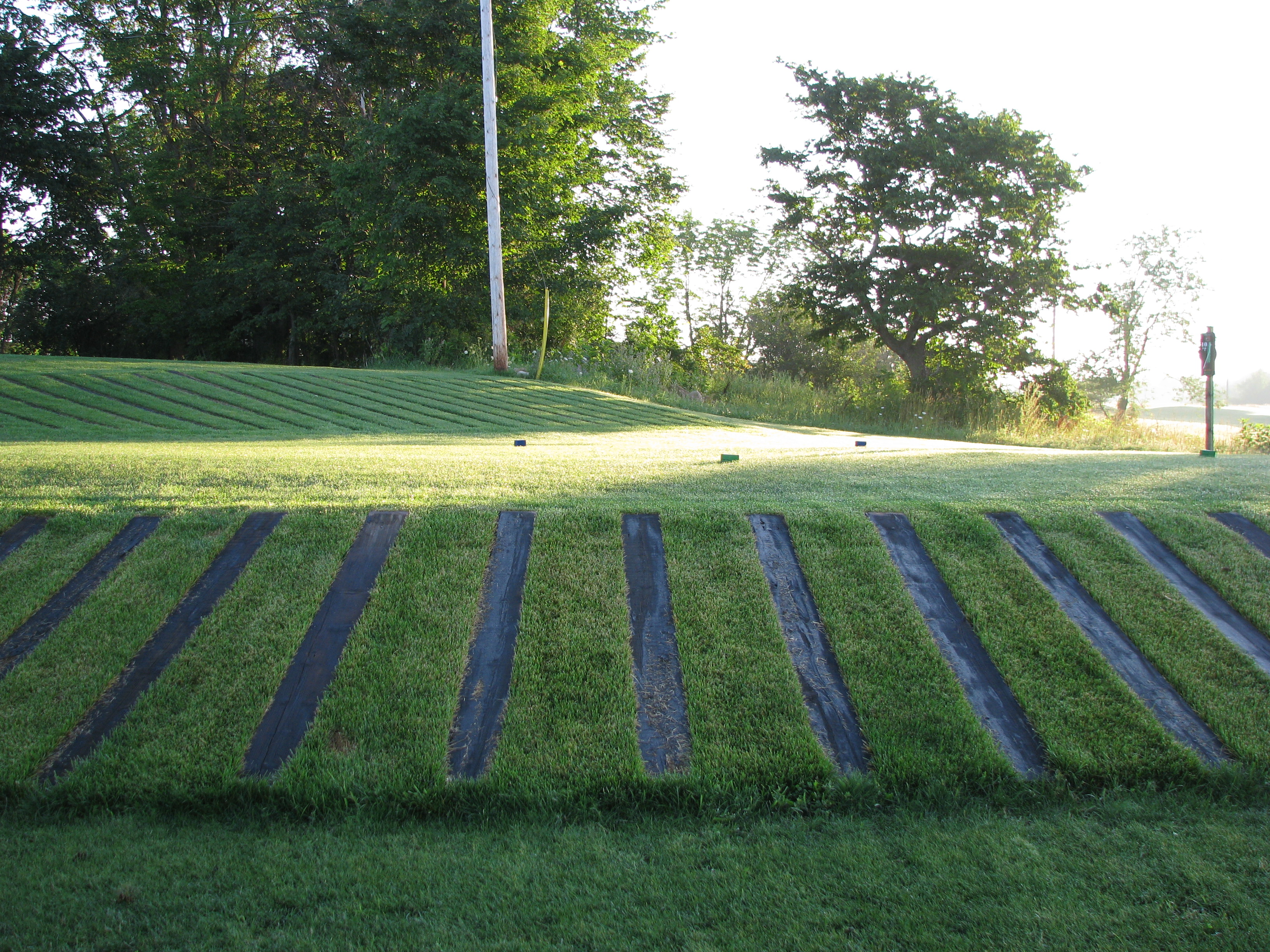
1st Tee

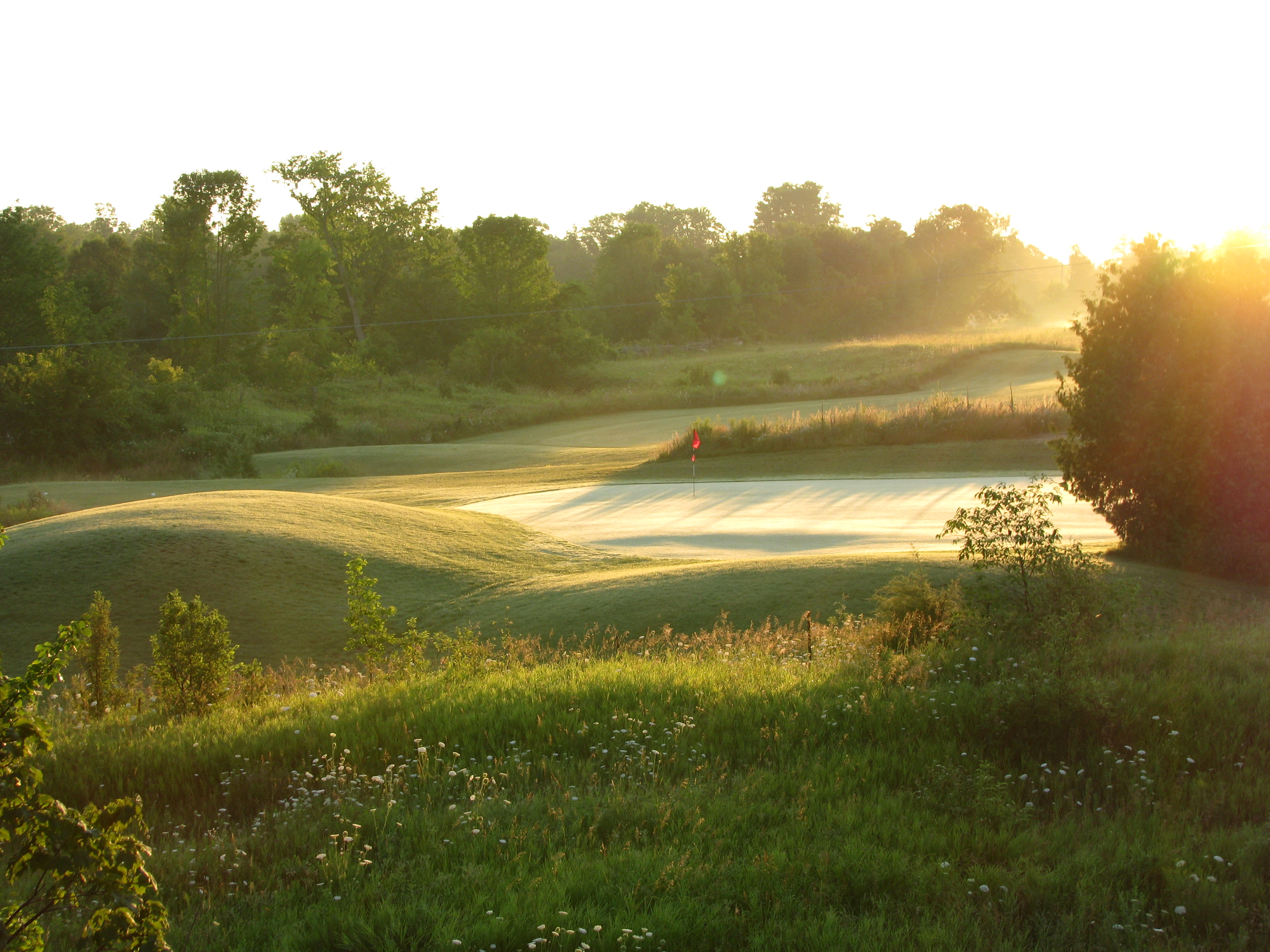
3rd Hole

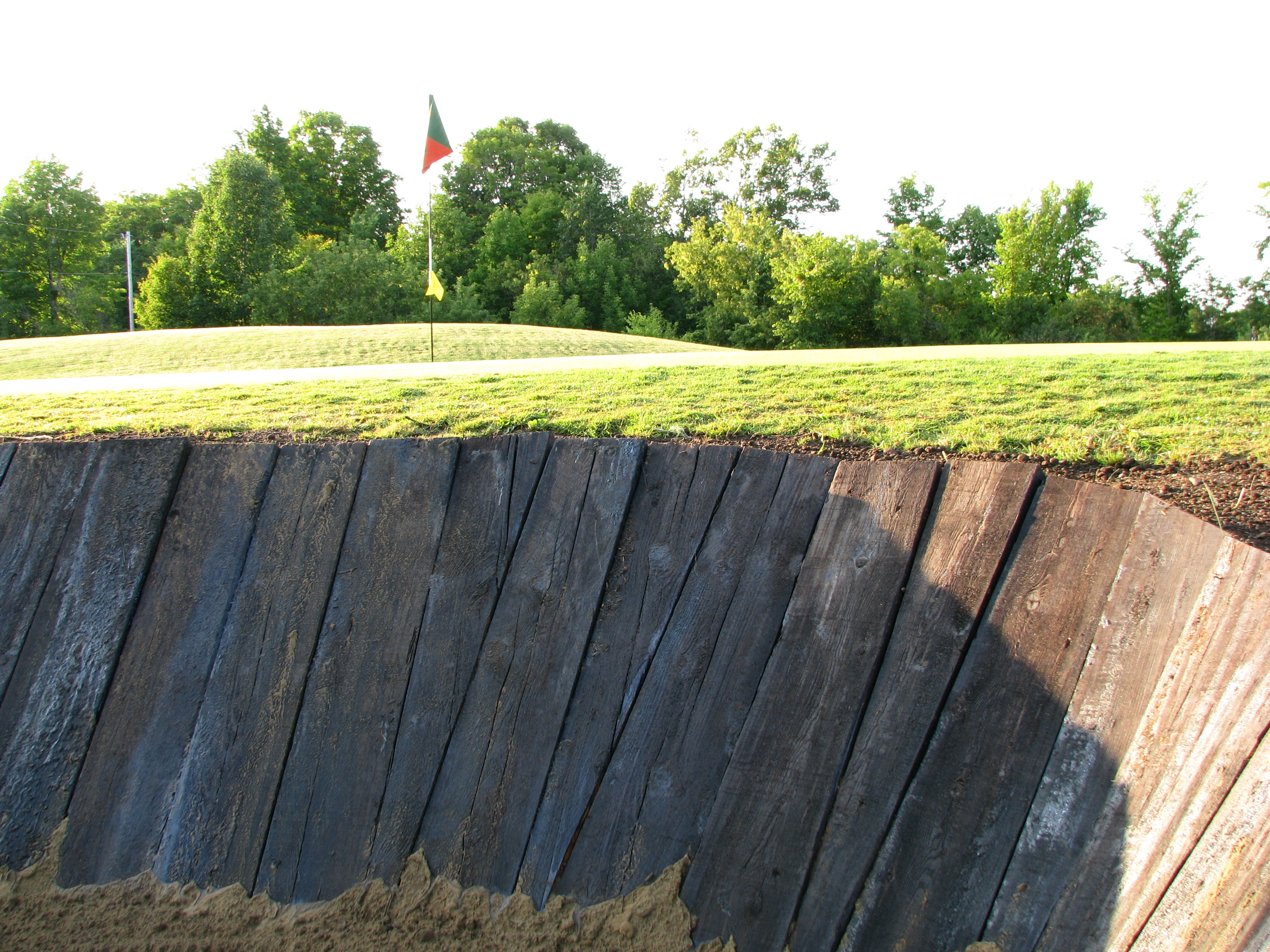
3rd Hole

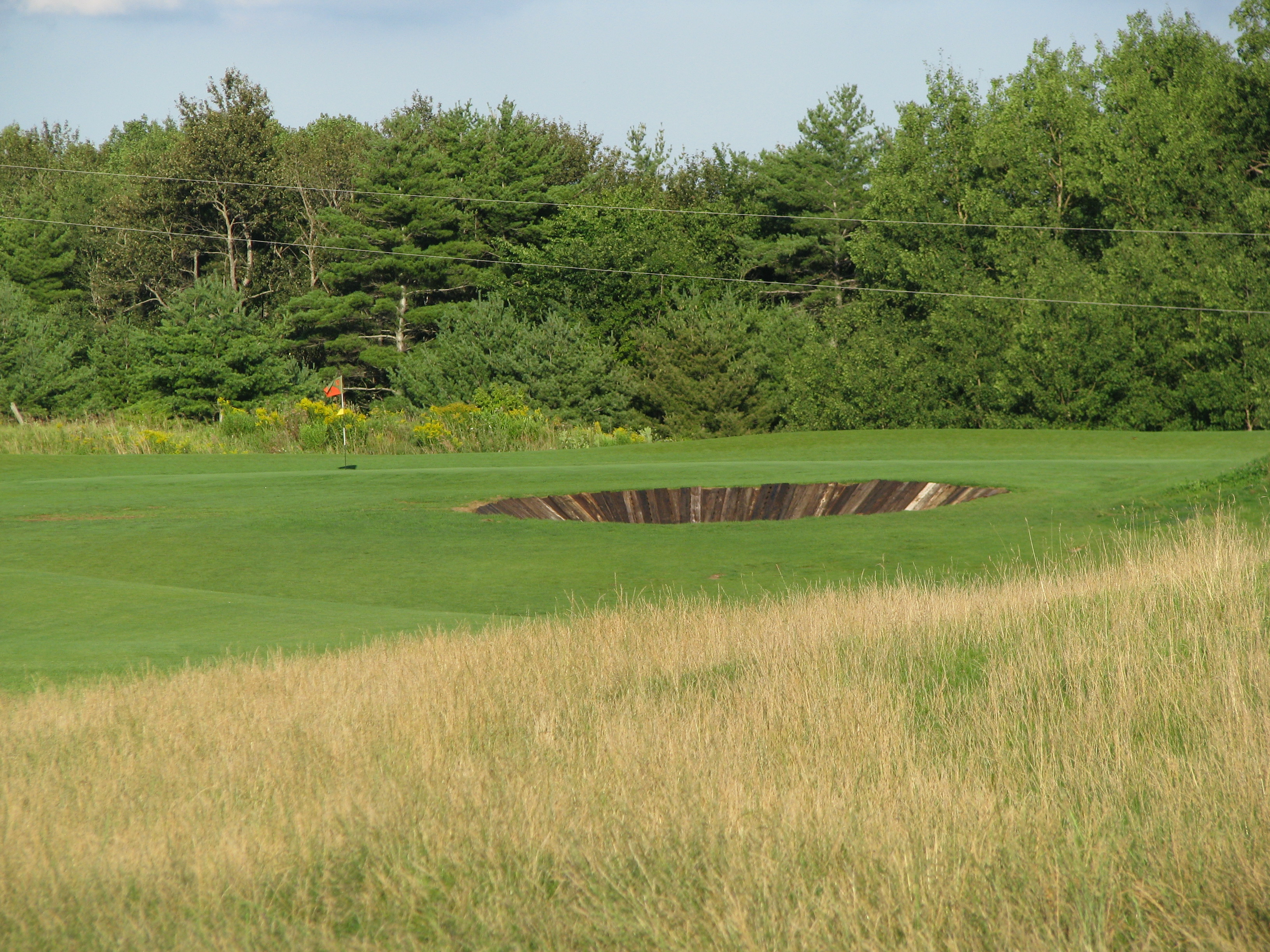
4th Hole

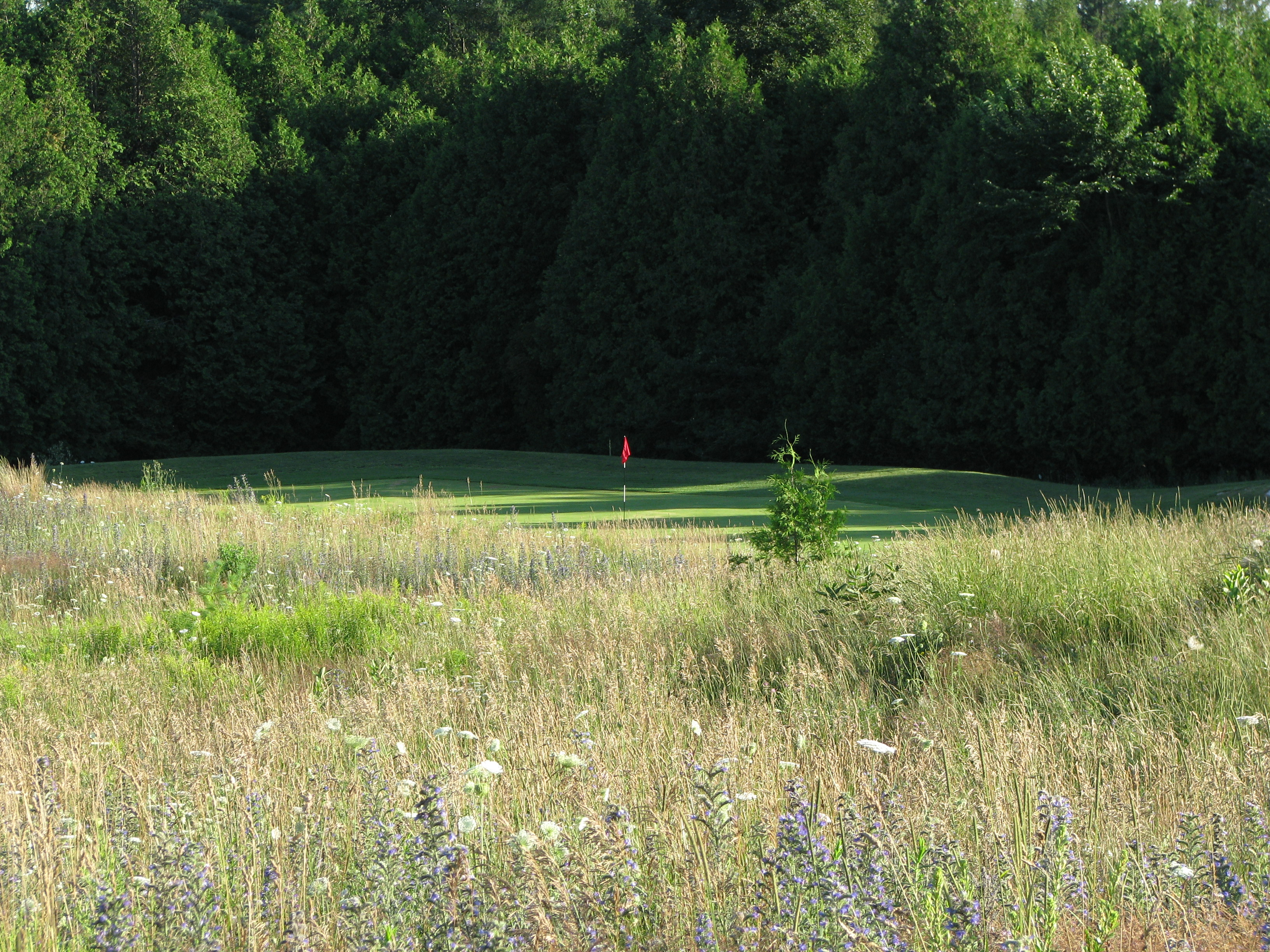
5th Hole

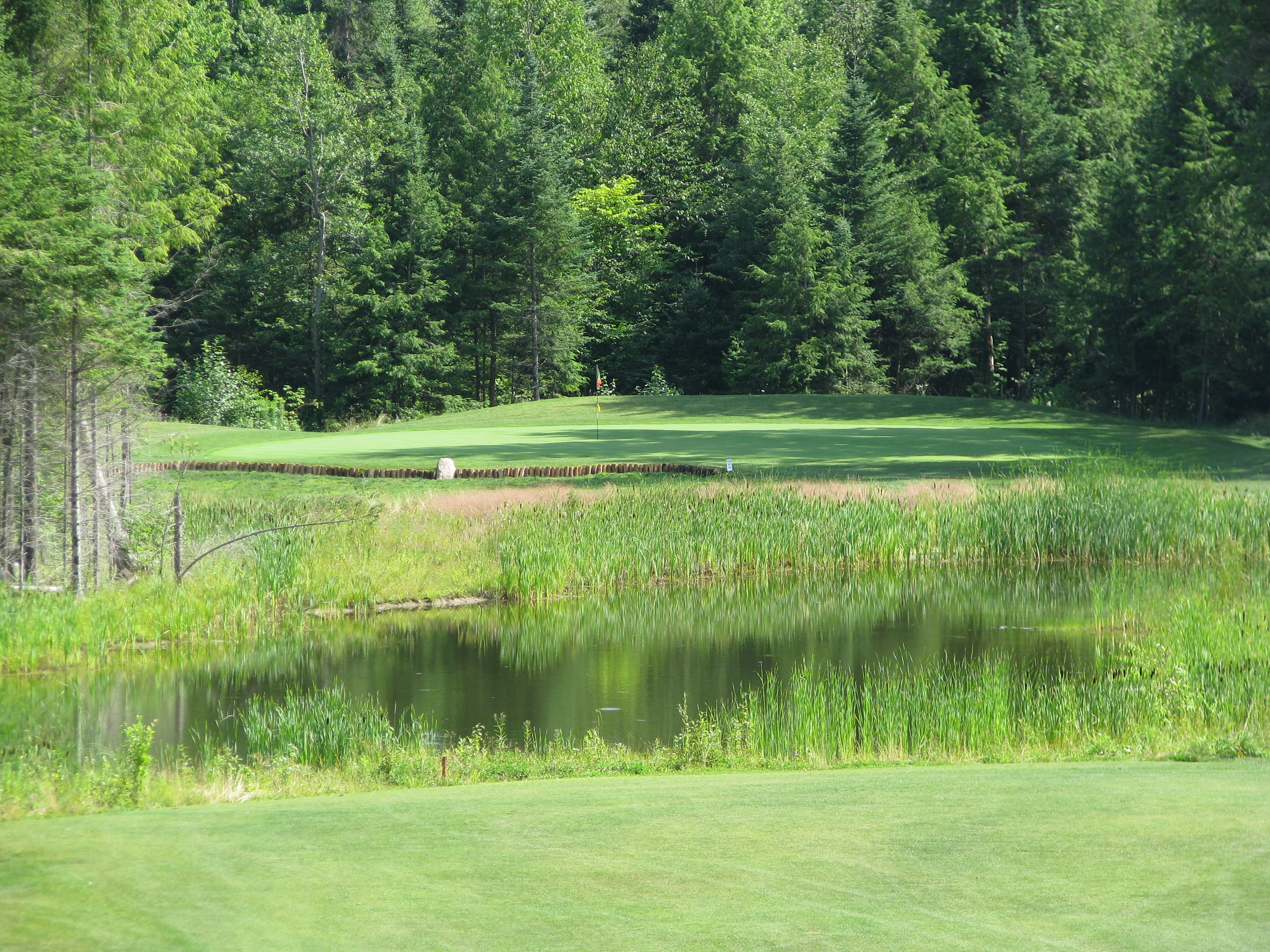
6th Hole

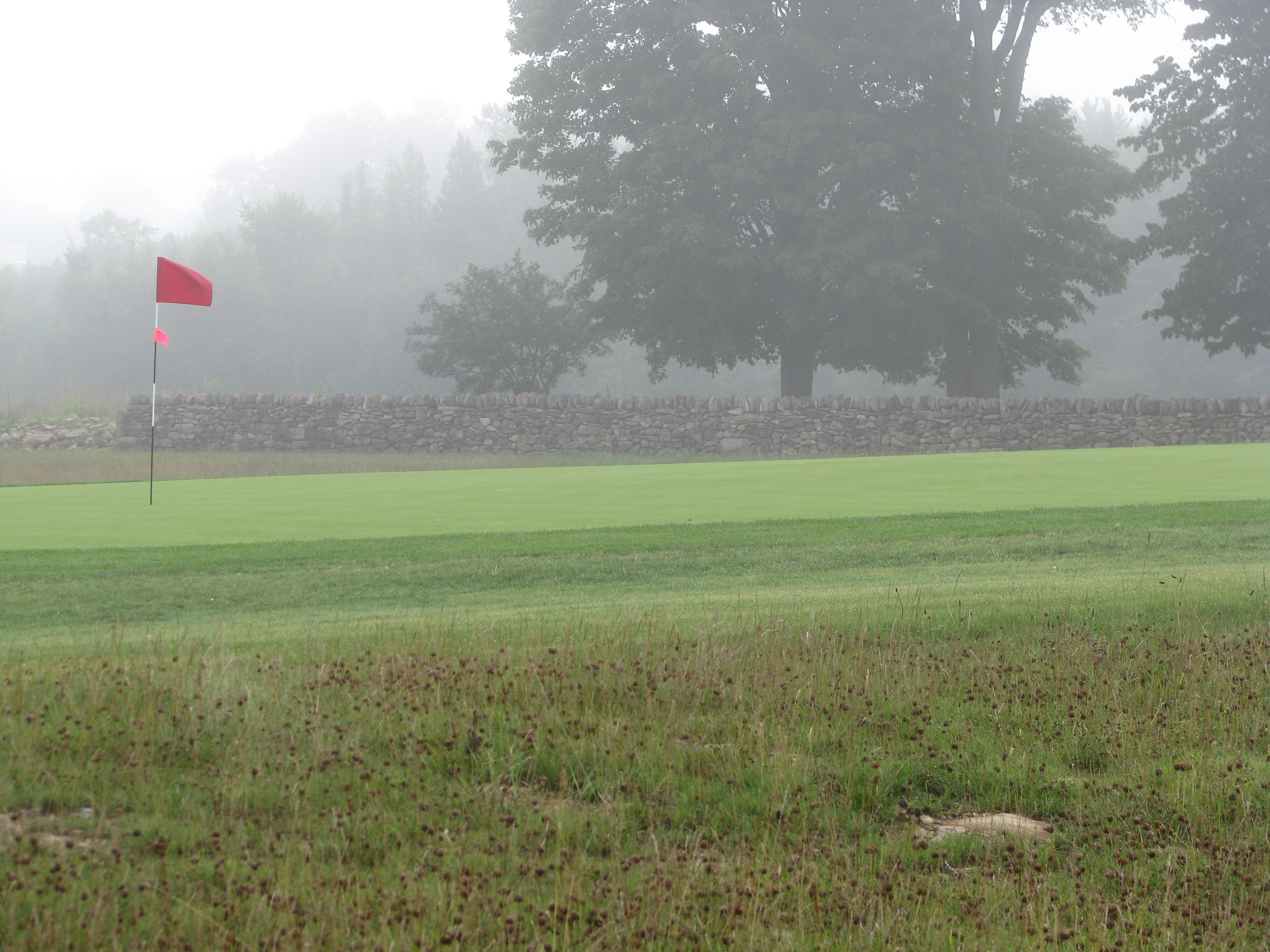
7th Hole

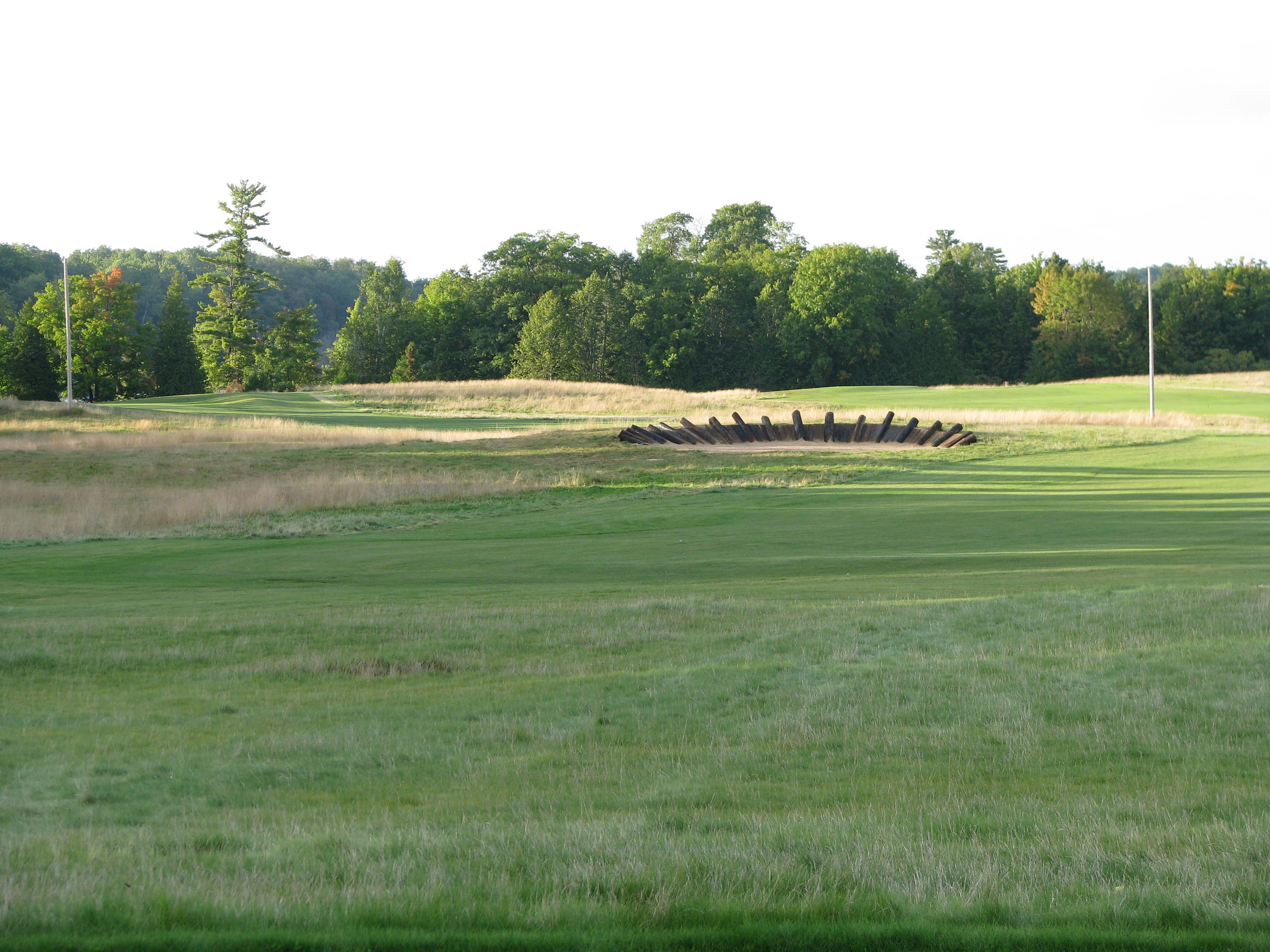
8th Hole
