= Dom Pedro Hotels & Golf Collection =

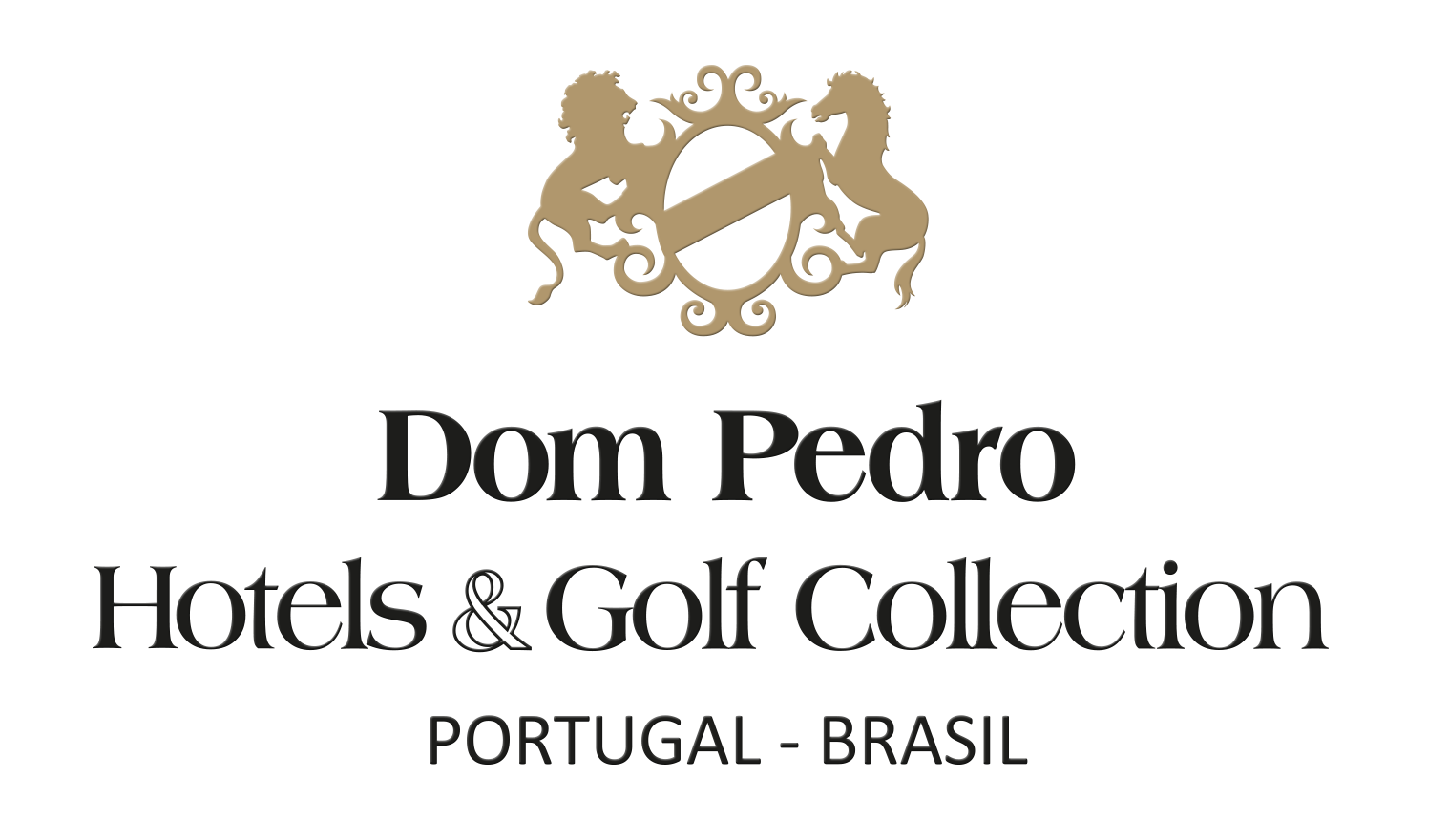
- Logo
- Company type: International group
- Industry: Hospitality and Golf
- Founded: 1968; 58 years ago
- Founder: Stefano Saviotti
- Headquarters: Lisbon, Portugal
- Number of locations: Portugal & Brazil
- Area served: Global
- Website: www.dompedro.com

Dom Pedro Hotels & Golf Collection is a Portugal-based, international brand of hotels and resorts in Portugal and Brazil. Formerly known as Dom Pedro Hotels Group, the brand was renamed following the acquisition of the five golf courses in Vilamoura, Algarve, Portugal.

== History ==
Stefano Saviotti, who opened the Dom Pedro Madeira (formerly Dom Pedro Baía) in 1973, then assuming control of the group in 1973 and making their first investments in Algarve tourism, with the opening of Dom Pedro Vilamoura (formerly Dom Pedro Golf) in 1976.

In 2017 Dom Pedro Group re-branded as Dom Pedro Hotels & Golf Collection following the purchase of the Victoria Golf Course, Old Course, Millenium Golf Course, Pinhal Golf Course and Laguna Golf Course in Vilamoura, Algarve from the Oceânico Group.

== Golf courses ==
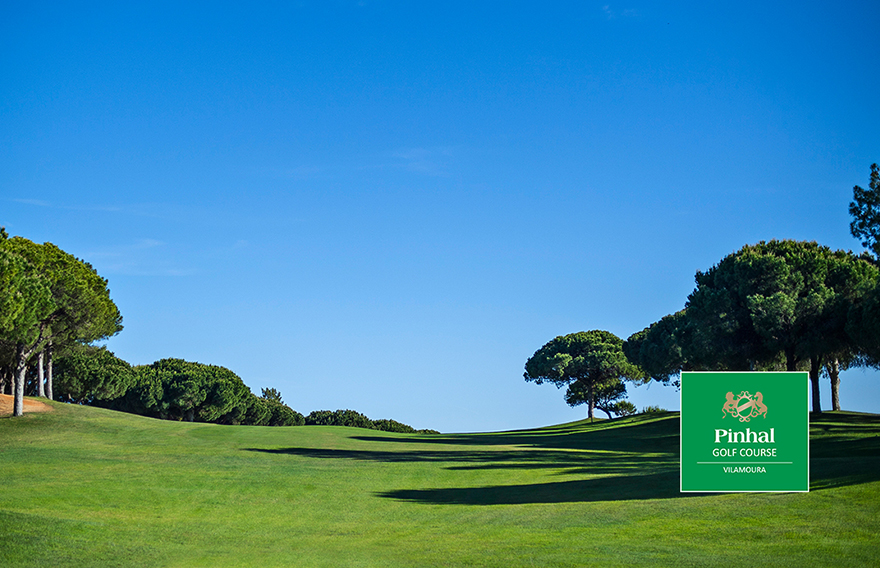
The Pinhal Golf Course

The golf courses at Vilamoura have hosted many professional golf tournaments. The Old Course hosted the Portuguese Open in 1976, and since 2007, the Victoria Course has hosted the European Tour's Portugal Masters.

- Victoria Golf Course is an 18-hole, Par 72 golf course designed by Arnold Palmer in 2004. It was the host venue for the 2005 WGC-World Cup, and has been home to the Portugal Masters since 2007.
- Pinhal Golf Course, originally founded in 1976 and updated in 1985, was designed by both Frank Pennink and Robert Trent Jones Sr. and possesses a par of 72.
- The Old Course is an 18-hole, Par 73 golf course designed by Frank Pennink. It is sometimes referred to as the "Grande Dame" of the Algarve.
- Millennium Golf Course, founded in 2000, is a 27-hole complex.
- Laguna Golf Course, designed by golf course architect Joseph Lee and originally founded in 1990, is an 18-hole course.
