= Quarteira =

- Civil parish
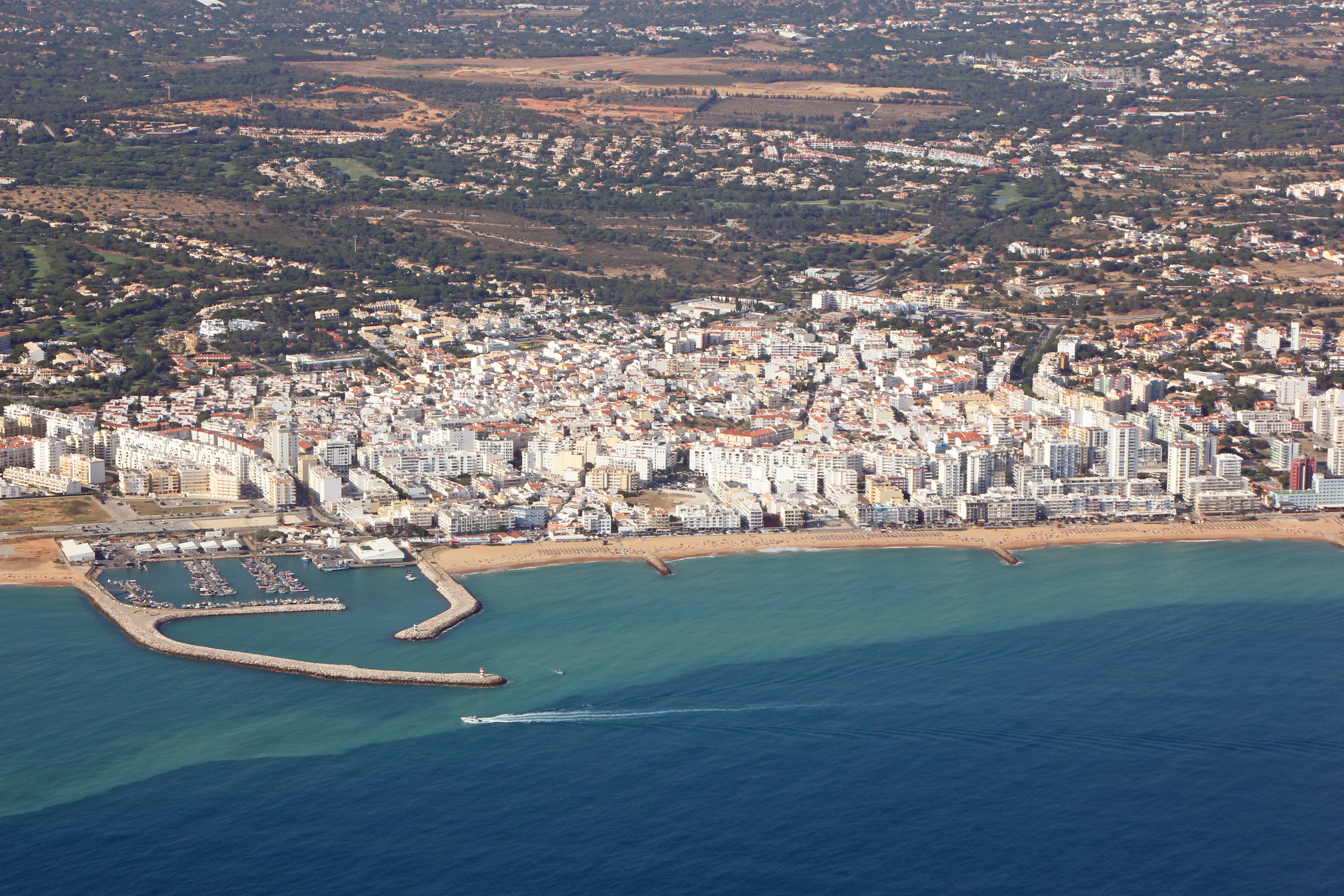

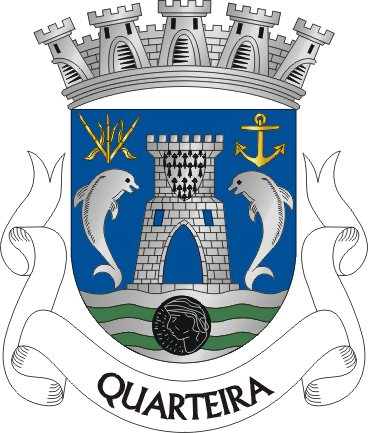
- Coat of arms

- Location in Portugal
- Coordinates: 37.069°N 8.103°W
- Country: Portugal
- Region: Algarve
- Intermunic. comm.: Algarve
- District: Faro
- Municipality: Loulé

Area
  - Total: 38.16 km^{2} (14.73 sq mi)

Population (2011)
  - Total: 21,798
  - Density: 571.2/km^{2} (1,479/sq mi)
- Time zone: UTC+00:00 (WET)
  - Summer (DST): UTC+01:00 (WEST)
- Postal code: 8125
- Area code: 289
- Website: http://www.jf-quarteira.pt/

Quarteira (pronounced [kwɐɾˈtɐjɾɐ], locally [kwɐɾˈteɾɐ]) is a Portuguese city, within the city and municipality (concelho) of Loulé in the Algarve. The population in 2011 was 21,798, in an area of 38.16 km².

== History ==
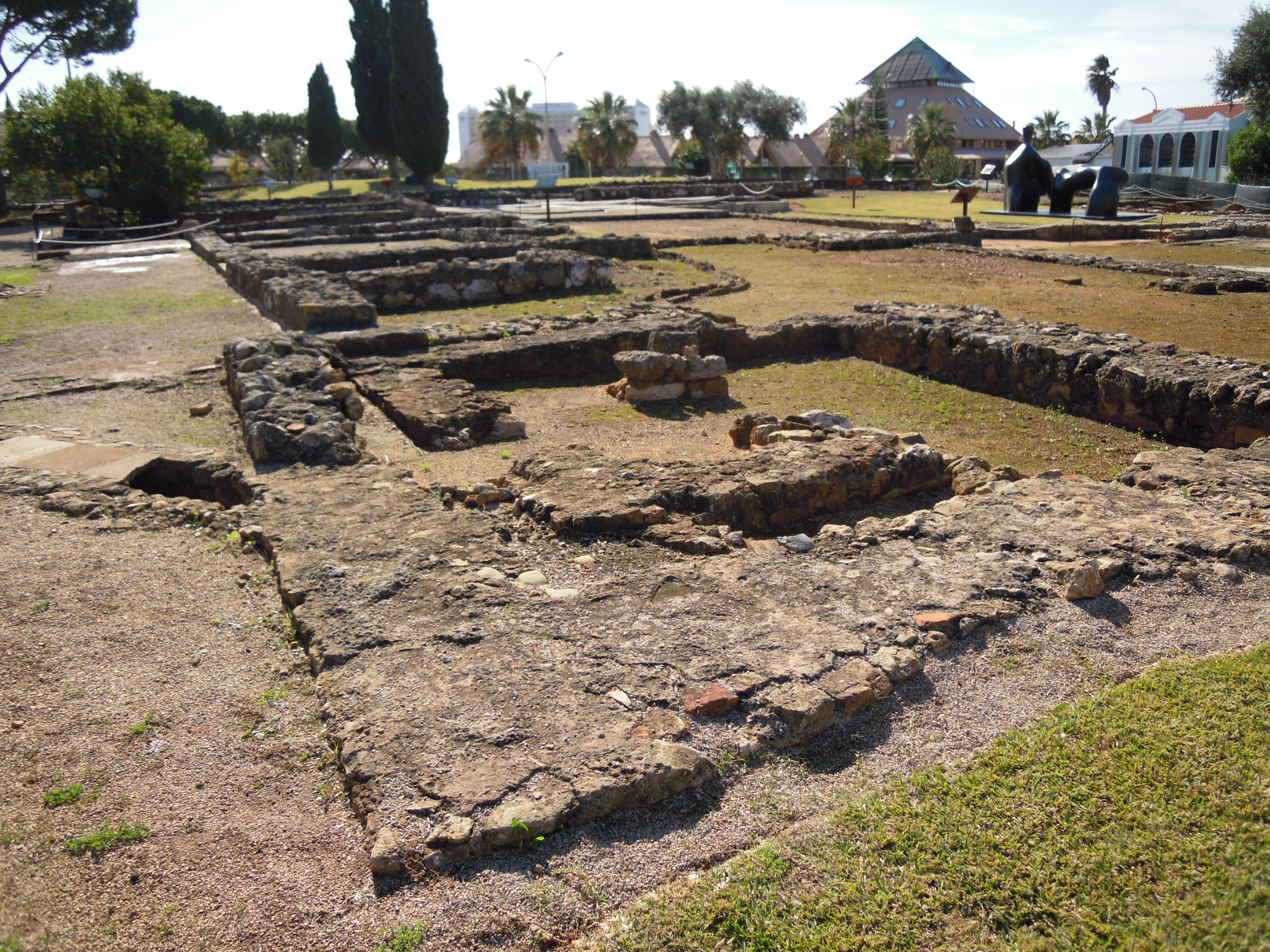
The Roman ruins of Cerro da Vila located in the area of Vilamoura

The settlement of the region dates back to, at least, the Roman occupation of the Iberian Peninsula (at one time confused with the village of Carteia). There are still other authors who suggest that settlement of the region may have begun in the era of Phoenician or Carthaginian traders.

For several centuries, Quarteira was a modest fishing village, situated on the edge of a 3 kilometres (1.9 mi) beach, encircled by pines. King Denis authorized a foral (charter) for the settlement on 15 November 1297.

In the 15th century, King John I of Portugal ordered the first cultivation of sugar cane in continental Portugal.

Created in 1916, the civil parish quickly became known for its beaches, fishing and its forests of pine.

Quarteira was elevated to the status of cidade (city) on 13 May 1999.

== Geography ==
Quarteira is a coastal civil parish, located along the southern extent of the Algarve fronting Albufeira Municipality to the west (in the parish of Olhos de Água). In addition, the local area authority is bordered in the east by Almancil, northeast by São Clemente, north by São Sebastião and Boliqueime.

From the Atlantic coast, the frontier with its neighbours extends northwest along the Ribeira de Algibre, before following the M526 municipal roadway to the Estrada Nacional EN125 in Maritenda. From here, the border travels southeast along the EN125 until just after the N396 motorway, where it then divides along a ravine southwest towards the Atlantic Ocean, alongside the Royal Golf Course. The coast includes 5.5 kilometres (3.4 mi) of normally-classified Blue Flag beach.

== Economy ==
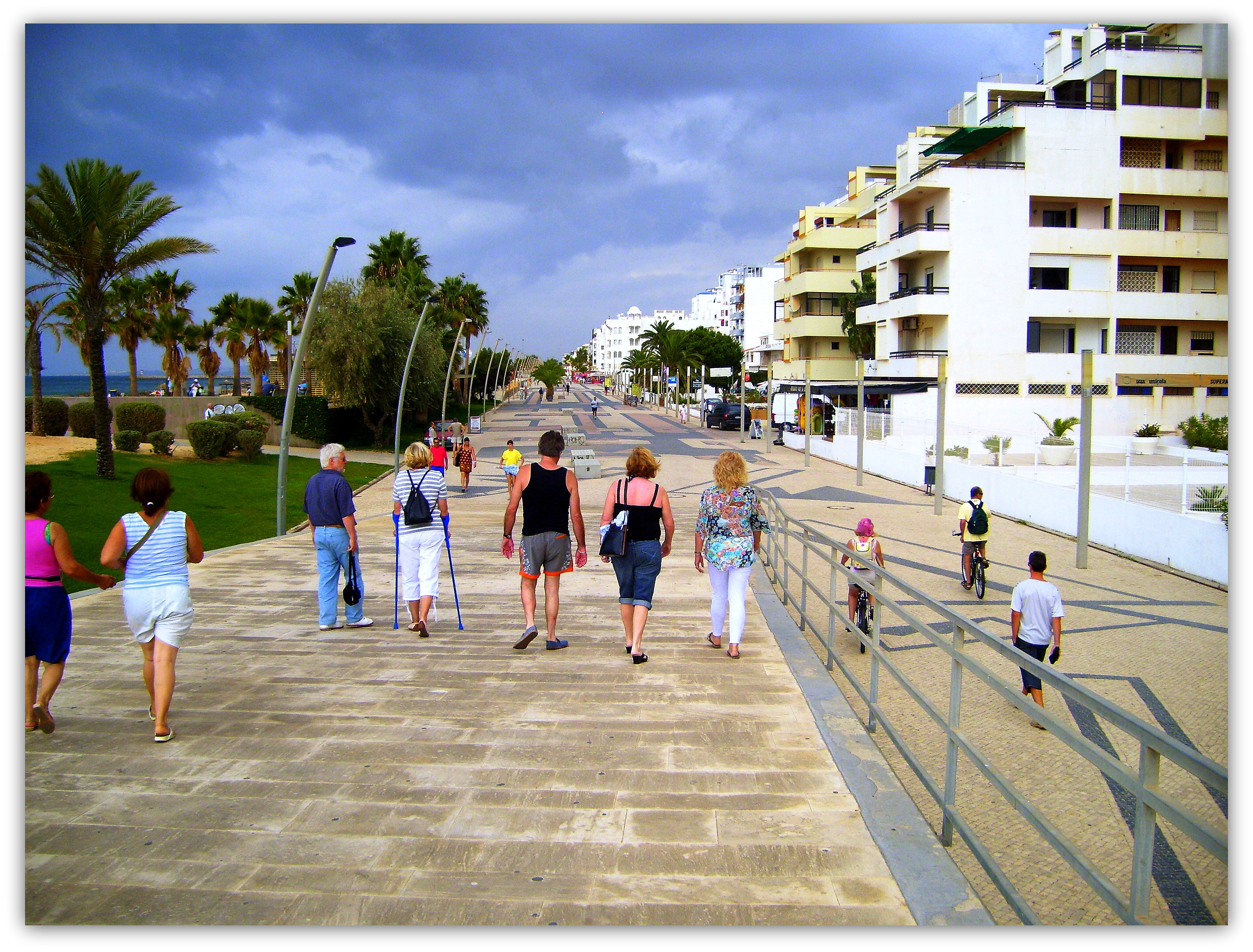
Promenade and hotels in Quarteira

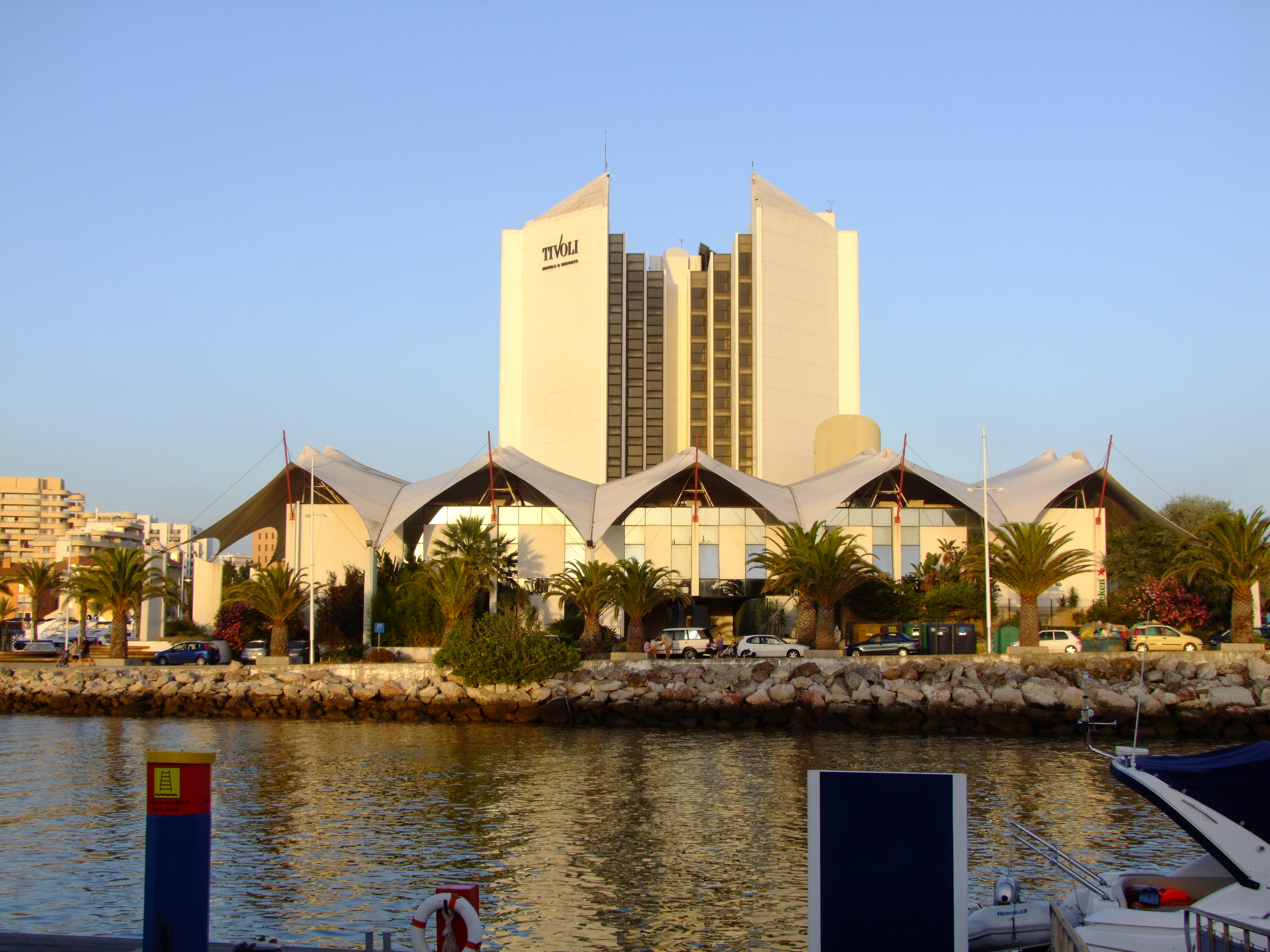
The Vilamoura-Marinotel

Golf remains a symbol for this parish, municipality, and region, with five distinct golf courses contributing to the economy, particularly during the off-season.

In relation to this sport, the parish is home to Vilamoura, Europe's largest private tourist facility. In addition, the region accommodates various tourists with two hundred hotels and residences, including casinos, bars and discos.

== Architecture ==
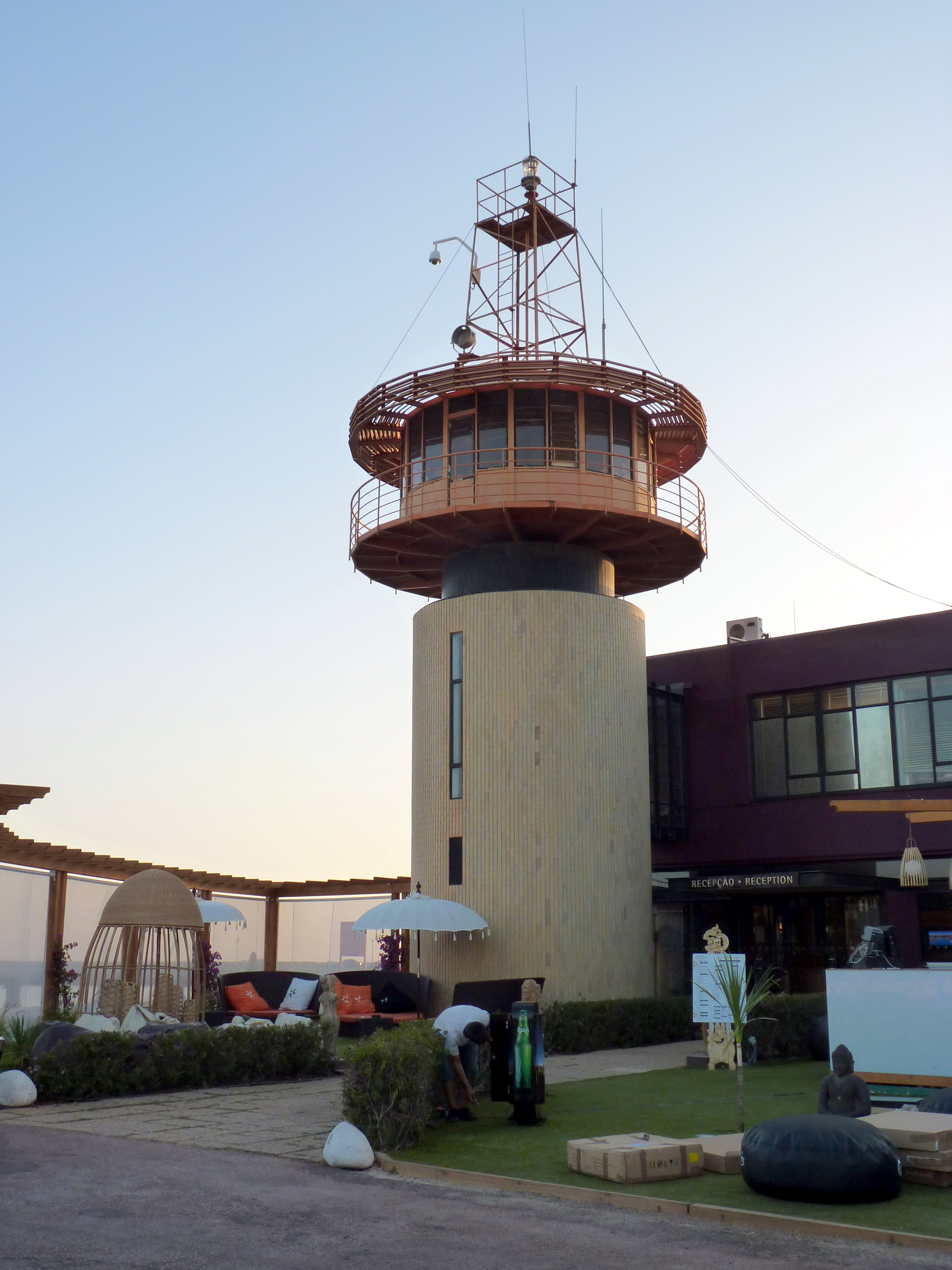
The modernesque lighthouse of Vilamoura

=== Archaeological ===
- Roman ruins of Cerro da Vila (Ruínas Romanas do Cerro da Vila, em Vilamoura)

=== Civic ===
- Apartment Complex Avenida de Sagres, 147/149 (Edifícios na Avenida Infante de Sagres, n.º 147 e n.º 149/Edifícios Laginha e Seguro)
- Apartment Complex Quarteira I (Edifício Quarteira I)
- Apartment Complex Rua de São Tomé e Príncipe, 26/36 (Edifícios na Rua de São Tomé e Príncipe, n.º 26 a n.º 36)
- Fiscal Guard Post of Quarteira (Posto da Guarda Fiscal de Quarteira)
- Lighthouse of Vilamoura (Farol de Vilamoura/Farolim de Vilamoura)
- Loulé-Praia de Quarteira Railway Station (Estação Ferroviária de Loulé-Praia de Quarteira)
- Maritime Delegation of Quarteira (Delegação Maritímo da Quarteira)
- Residence Cada do Mirante (Moradia na Avenida Infante de Sagres n.º 79/Casa do Mirante)
- Residence Gonçalves (Moradia na Av. Infante de Sagres, n.º 165/Casa Gonçalves)
- Residence Villa Sol e Mar (Moradia na Avenida Infante de Sagres, n.º 83/Villa Sol e Mar)
- Residence Casa Martins Laginha (Prédio na Rua Bartolomeu Dias n.º 27/Casa Martins Laginha)
- Restaurante-Residencial Toca do Coelho/Hotel D. José

=== Military ===
- Fort of Armação (Forte Novo/Forte da Armação)

=== Religious ===
- Church of Nossa Senhora da Conceição (Igreja Paroquial da Quarteira/Igreja de Nossa Senhora da Conceição)
- Church of São Pedro do Mar (Igreja de São Pedro do Mar)
- Church of Vilamoura (Igreja de Vilamoura)

== Culture ==
Among other festivities attracting tourism to the region is the Marchas Populares in June.

== Twin Town — Sister City ==
The following place is Sister City to Quarteira :

- Vilamoura, Portugal
