= Frank Pennink =

British golfer, journalist, and golf course architect (1913–1983)

John Jacob Frank Pennink
- Born: 1913; Delft, Netherlands
- Died: 1983 (aged 69–70); Forest Row, East Sussex, England
- Occupations: Golfer; Journalist; Golf course designer

John Jacob Frank Pennink (1913–1983) was a British amateur golfer, sports journalist, and golf course architect.

== Life ==
John Jacob Frank Pennink was born in Delft, Netherlands, in 1913. His father had a strong interest in sports, which Pennink shared. He attended Tonbridge School in Kent, an independent boys' school, where he played in the school's cricket first eleven in a match against Clifton College at Lord's Cricket Ground. He then attended Magdalen College, Oxford University, and played on the university golf team from 1933 to 1935, serving as team captain in 1935.

After graduating from university, Pennink worked for an insurance company based in the City of London but continued to play golf as an amateur. In 1937, he won the English Amateur, the Royal St George's Gold Vase, and the South of England Amateur. The English Amateur that year was held at Saunton Golf Club. He won the English Amateur again in 1938 at Moortown Golf Club, with the match decided on the 19th hole. He also played alongside Leonard Crawley in the winning British team for the Walker Cup in 1938.

During World War II, Pennink joined the Royal Air Force, eventually reaching the rank of squadron leader. After his discharge, he worked as a journalist covering golf for the Sunday Express and later for the Daily Mail. In 1962, he published the book Golfer’s Companion.

In 1954, Pennink partnered with Charles Kenneth Cotton and Charles Lawrie to form Cotton, Pennink and Partners Ltd., a golf course architecture firm. Later, Donald Steel joined the company. Pennink designed numerous golf courses in Britain, Europe, and the Far East. Known for his architectural style, Pennink favored simple but effective greens, often on plateaus with steep run-offs, and used limited bunkering on fairways. A distinctive feature of his designs was planting a tree in the center of the fairway. Some of his most acclaimed courses include the Olgiata Golf Club in Italy (1961, co-designed with Ken Cotton), Oceanico's Old Course (1969), Lisbon Aroeira I (1972), Palmares (1975), Oceanico's Pinhal in Portugal (1976), and Noordwijk Golf Club in the Netherlands.

In 1967, Pennink became president of the English Golf Union and served as a selector for the Walker Cup team for several years. He died of cancer in 1983.

== Notable courses ==
Notable courses designed by Pennink in Europe included the Vilamoura Old Course in Vilamoura, Algarve, Portugal, which opened in 1969. Known for its parkland style, the Old Course winds through gently rolling terrain lined with large pine trees and has been called the "Grande Dame" of Algarve courses. In 1996, Martin Hawtree undertook a major renovation of the course, maintaining its original layout. Originally named Oceanico's Old Course, it is now called the Dom Pedro Old Course and is considered a classic example of the English course design style.

Pennink also designed the Dom Pedro Pinhal in the Algarve, which was renovated in 1985 by Robert Trent Jones. Additionally, he created the course for the Royal Country Club de Tanger in Tangier, Morocco.

Other European courses designed by Pennink include:

- Clube de Campo da Aroeira I & II, Charneca de Caparica, Portugal
- Drentse Golfclub 'de Gelpenberg', Aalden, Netherlands
- Golf Club Castell' Arquato, Castell'Arquato, Italy
- Golfclub de Haar, Vleuten, Netherlands
- Golfclub Ostfriesland e.V., Wiesmoor, Germany
- Golf de Nantes, Vigneux-de-Bretagne, France
- Kokkedal Golfklub, Hørsholm, Denmark
- Kungsbacka Golf Club (Old Course), Sweden
- Noordwijkse Golf Club, Noordwijk, Netherlands
- Osnabrücker Golf Club e.V., Bissendorf-Jeggen, Germany
- Palmares Club, Meia Praia, Lagos, Portugal
- Stora Lundby Golfklubb, Gråbo, Sweden

Pennink also designed several notable courses in Britain:

- Barnham Broom Golf Club
- Conwy Golf Club
- Frilford Heath Golf Club – Red Course
- Ganton Golf Club, Scarborough, North Yorkshire, UK
- Goswick Golf Club (Berwick Upon Tweed Golf Club)
- Gullane Golf Club No. 2
- Lamberhurst Golf Club, Lamberhurst, Kent, UK
- Littlestone Golf Club – Championship Links
- Royal Aberdeen Golf Club – Balgownie Course
- Royal Cromer Golf Club
- Royal Liverpool Golf Club (Hoylake)
- Royal Lytham & St Annes Golf Club
- Royal St George's Golf Club
- Royal Wimbledon Golf Club
- Saunton Golf Club – West Course
- Seaton Carew Golf Club (Durham & Yorkshire Club)
- Tewkesbury Park, Tewkesbury, Gloucestershire, UK
- Woburn Golf Club – Duchess' and Duke's Courses

== Tournament wins ==
- 1935 West of England Open Amateur
- 1937 English Amateur
- 1938 English Amateur, Royal St. George's Gold Vase
- 1952 Sussex County Championship

== Team appearances ==
- Walker Cup (representing Great Britain and Ireland): 1938 (winners)

== Publications ==
- Pennink, Frank (1952), Homes of Sport: Golf, Peter Garnett
- Pennink, Frank (1962), Frank Pennink's Golfer's Companion, Cassell
- Pennink, Frank (1976), Frank Pennink's Choice of golf courses, A. and C. Black, ISBN 0713616598

== Sources ==
- Berlitz (1 February 2020), Berlitz Pocket Guide Algarve (Travel Guide eBook), Apa Publications, ISBN 978-1-78573-266-9
- English Amateur Golf Championship At Saunton Won By Jjf Pennink 1937, British Pathé
- Fodor, Eugene; Curtis, William (1992), Fodor's Portugal, D. McKay., ISBN 978-0-679-02082-0
- Hogg, Anthony (1987), Travellers' Portugal, Boerum Hill Books, ISBN 978-0-9508955-2-9
- "Frank Pennink", Evalu18
- "Frank Pennink", Fine Golf
- Frank Pennink, RAFGS (Royal Air Force Golfing Society), 28 September 2019
- "Golf Courses by Frank Pennink", Albrecht Golf Guide
- "Pennink Wins at 19th; Defending Champion Advances in English Amateur Golf", The New York Times, 27 April 1938
- "The Oceânico Old Course in Vilamoura", Oceanico Golf, archived from the original on 31 August 2009
