= 2005 WGC-World Cup =

2005 World Cup
Tournament information
- Dates: 17–20 November
- Location: Vilamoura, Algarve, Portugal; 37°4′40″N 8°6′55″W
- Course: Oceânico Golf (Victoria Course)
- Format: 72 holes stroke play (best ball & alternate shot)

Statistics
- Par: 72
- Length: 7,174 yards (6,560 m)
- Field: 24 two-man teams
- Cut: None
- Prize fund: US$4.0 million
- Winner's share: US$1.4 million

Champion
- Wales; Stephen Dodd & Bradley Dredge
- 189 (−27)
- Location in Europe Location i Portugal

The 2005 WGC-World Cup took place 17–20 November at the Oceânico Golf on its Victoria Course in Vilamoura, Algarve, Portugal. It was the 51st World Cup and the sixth as a World Golf Championship event.

The course was designed by Arnold Palmer and opened in 2004, the year before it hosted the World Cup. Eleven years after this tournament, in 2016, Dom Pedro Golf acquired the Victoria Course and four other Vilamoura courses from Oceânico Golf.

24 countries competed and each country sent two players. The prize money totaled $4,000,000 with $1,400,000 going to the winning pair. The Welsh team of Stephen Dodd and Bradley Dredge won. They won by two strokes over the English and Swedish teams after the event was shortened to 54 holes due to rain.

== Qualification and format ==
The defending champion was joined by 18 teams based on the Official World Golf Ranking and five teams via qualification.

The tournament was scheduled to be a 72-hole stroke play team event with each team consisting of two players. The first and third days were fourball play and the second and final days were foursomes play. The final round was canceled due to rain.

== Teams ==
Country	Players
Argentina	Ángel Cabrera and Ricardo González
Australia	Mark Hensby and Peter Lonard
Colombia	Eduardo Herrera and Diego Vanegas
Denmark	Anders Hansen and Søren Hansen
England	Luke Donald and David Howell
France	Raphaël Jacquelin and Thomas Levet
Germany	Alex Čejka and Christian Reimbold
India	Arjun Atwal and Jyoti Randhawa
Ireland	Pádraig Harrington and Paul McGinley
Japan	Yasuharu Imano and Takuya Taniguchi
Mexico	Pablo del Olmo and Alex Quiroz
Netherlands	Robert-Jan Derksen and Maarten Lafeber
Paraguay	Carlos Franco and Marco Ruiz
Portugal	José-Filipe Lima and Antonio Sobrinho
Scotland	Scott Drummond and Stephen Gallacher
Singapore	Lam Chih Bing and Mardan Mamat
South Africa	Tim Clark and Trevor Immelman
South Korea	K. J. Choi and Jang Ik-jae
Spain	Sergio García and Miguel Ángel Jiménez
Sweden	Niclas Fasth and Henrik Stenson
Taiwan	Chang Tse-peng and Wang Ter-chang
United States	Stewart Cink and Zach Johnson
Venezuela	Manuel Bermudez and Carlos Larraín
Wales	Stephen Dodd and Bradley Dredge

== Scores ==
Place	Country	Score	To par	Money (US$)
1	Wales	61-67-61=189	−27	1,400,000
T2	England	59-69-63=191	−25	550,000
T2	Sweden	61-67-63=191	−25	550,000
4	France	63-70-61=194	−22	200,000
5	Denmark	64-68-63=195	−21	145,000
T6	Netherlands	63-67-66=196	−20	117,500
T6	Argentina	68-61-67=196	−20	117,500
8	Germany	65-68-64=197	−19	95,000
9	India	60-73-65=198	−18	80,000
T10	Taiwan	62-71-66=199	−17	67,500
T10	Spain	62-72-65=199	−17	67,500
T12	South Africa	68-67-65=200	−16	55,000
T12	Ireland	67-69-64=200	−16	55,000
T12	South Korea	67-71-62=200	−16	55,000
T15	Japan	63-70-68=201	−15	48,500
T15	Paraguay	63-73-65=201	−15	48,500
T17	Australia	60-73-69=202	−14	46,000
T17	Mexico	67-71-64=202	−14	46,000
T17	United States	65-70-67=202	−14	46,000
T20	Singapore	67-70-66=203	−13	43,000
T20	Scotland	65-74-64=203	−13	43,000
T20	Portugal	68-72-63=203	−13	43,000
23	Colombia	66-74-69=209	−7	41,000
24	Venezuela	66-75-69=210	−6	40,000
