= Roman ruins of Cerro da Vila =

Site in Loulé, Faro District, Portugal

Roman Ruins of Cerro da Vila
- Cerro da Vila
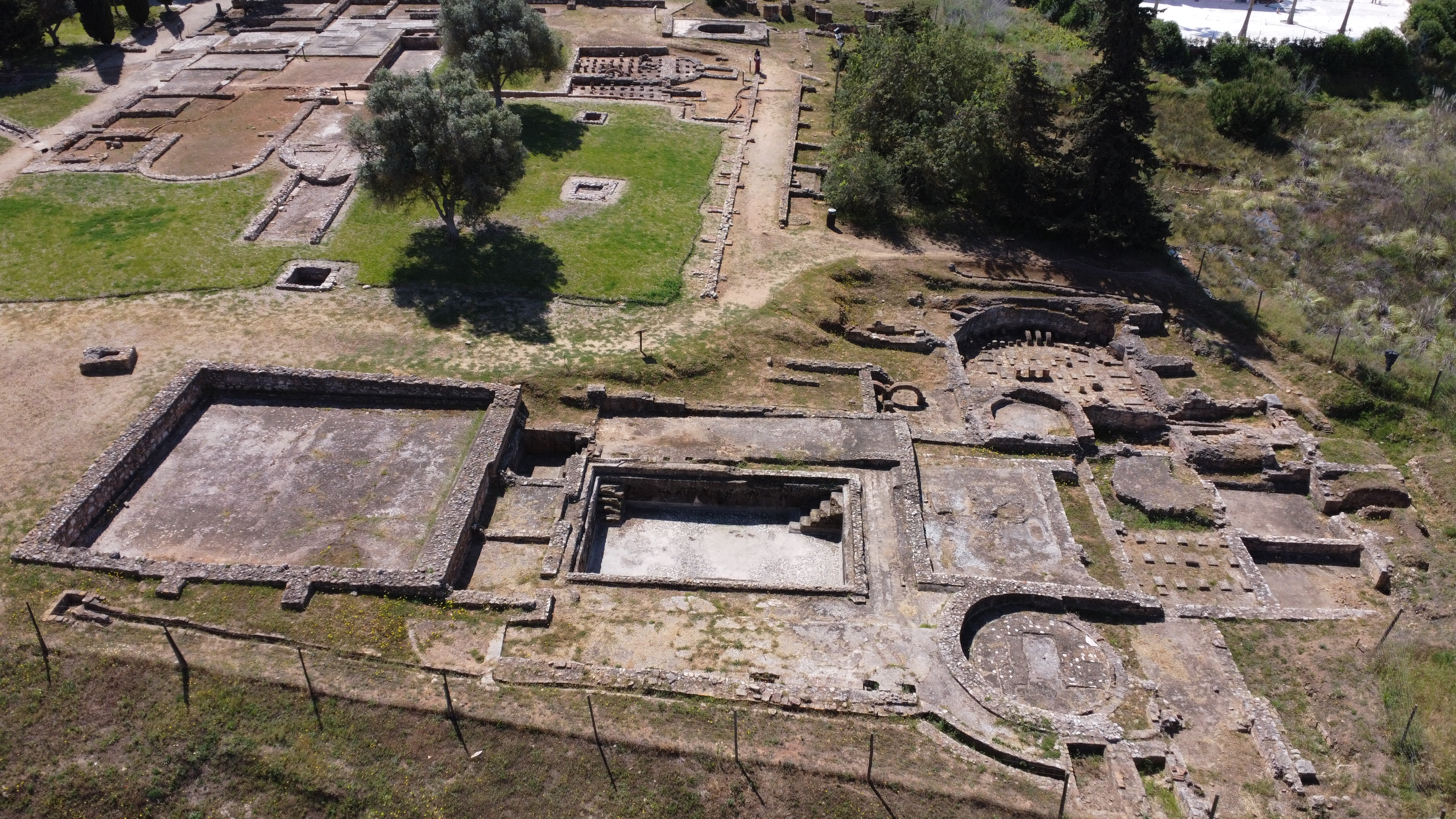
- Partial view of the Archaeological site of Cerro da Vila, in 2023.
- Interactive map of Roman Ruins of Cerro da Vila
- 37°4′47.81″N 8°7′13.82″W
- Type: Ruins
- Cultures: Roman
- Location: Faro, Algarve, Algarve, Portugal

History
- Built: I Century AD

Site notes
- Elevation: 11 m (36 ft)
- Length: 106.97 m (351.0 ft)
- Width: 146.95 m (482.1 ft)
- Archaeologists: José Farrajota, José Luís de Matos
- Discovered: 1963
- Owner: Portuguese Republic
- Public access: Private Avenida Cerro da Vila, opposite Hotel da Marinha, Vilamoura

The Roman Ruins of Cerro da Vila are the remnants of a historical villa in the Algarve region of southern Portugal. Its vestiges lie in the vicinity of the resort and marina of Vilamoura, in the civil parish of Quarteira, municipality of Loulé Municipality.

== History ==
The area around Vilamoura, in which the remains of this Roman villa can be found, has been occupied with human activity for thousands of years. Graves dating back to the Bronze Age were discovered in the municipality in the Casão vineyard.

The Romans were the first to establish a settlement of any size within the locality; during the 2nd century, the region of the Algarve fell under the domain of Rome, under the rule of Gaius Julius Caesar Augustus (23 September 63 BC – 19 August AD 14). The region was integrated into the Province of Lusitania, and reorganized into three civitas: Balsa (Luz de Tavira), Ossonoba (Faro) and Ciuitas, whose capital was either Cilpes (Silves) or more probably at Lacobriga (Lagos). Cerro da Vila was situated in the Ossonoba territory and had a port, serving the fertile lands irrigated by a dam two kilometres from the settlement.

Following its construction, the villa was periodically occupied by Visigoths and Arab (Moorish) forces. A group of silos from the Moorish period, in the interior of the Roman houses, support continuous occupation after the Romans.

It was included in the Programa de Valorização e Divulgação Turística: Itinerários Arqueológicos do Alentejo e Algarve (Touristic Valorization Program) in 1999, by the Ministry of Commerce and Tourism, and the Secretary-of-State for Culture. Consequently, in 2000, an interpretive centre, under the supervision of architect Fernando Galhano was constructed to support tourism, to be operated by the IPPR (later the Instituto Gestão do Patrimonio Arquitectónico e Arqueológico-IGESPAR).

== Architecture ==
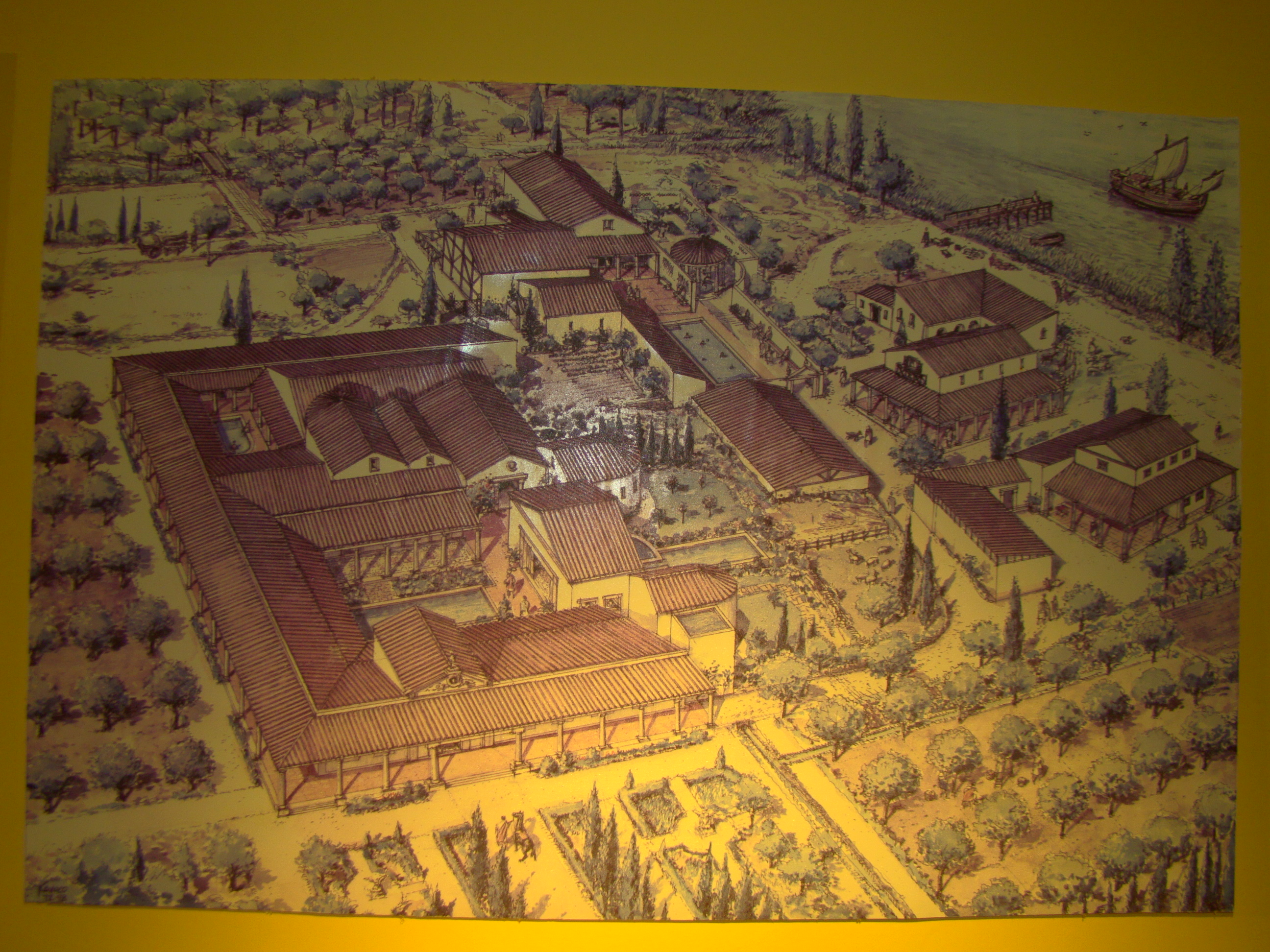
Representation of how the Vila appeared in Roman times.

The ruins are located in a semi-rural area; the archaeological station is situated 1500 metres west of the parish seat in Quarteira.

These are the ruins of Roman villa constituted by two residences (the principal along the harbour), baths, necropolis, dams and fish salting stations. Of the two residences and baths, the only remnants are compartmentalized walls, including the impluvium, atrium and tablinum. There exists friezes of marble and fragments of painted stucco that decorated the walls, as well as the remains of poly-chromatic mosaic pavements. Two rectangular tanks serve the fish salting "buildings". The necropole, which includes the remains of mausoleums and burial tombs, came much later and only recently has been unearthed and investigated.

== See also ==
- Roman ruins of Casais Velhos
- Roman ruins of Creiro
