= Norland, Ontario =

Hamlet in Ontario, Canada

Coordinates: 44°43′39″N 78°48′43″W

Norland is a hamlet within the city of Kawartha Lakes, in the Canadian Province of Ontario. Named after Norland in Yorkshire, England, the settlement was founded by William H. Smith, and attracted settlers with a growing Lumber industry and fertile lands. Since its founding in the early 19th century, Norland remains a small farming community with an estimated population of 600.

From 1854-1967, Norland was a part of Victoria County within British North America, then on 1 July 1867, it was joined with Laxton, Digby and Longford Township until 1 July 2001, when they were amalgamated to become the city of Kawartha Lakes, Ontario.

Norland is located on a scenic spot on the Gull River at the north end of Shadow Lake, the northernmost Kawartha lake in the Trent River chain. Here, a series of three waterfalls reflect the change in elevation of the land leading north to the Haliburton Highlands.

Located within the city of Kawartha Lakes, Norland falls under the leadership of Mayor Andy Letham. Originally elected as Mayor in 2014, Letham has been elected to serve his second term in the 2018 municipal election. The city of Kawartha Lakes is currently split into 16 different wards, each with their own councillor. Norland is located in Ward 1, councillor being Rob Macklem. The 2018 Municipal elections bring change to the political structure of Norland, and Kawartha Lakes as a whole. Previously being 16 wards, the new political term, beginning on December 3, 2018, will result in the reduction of Kawartha Lakes to 8 wards, bringing Norland a new councillor, Emmet Yeo.

== Features ==
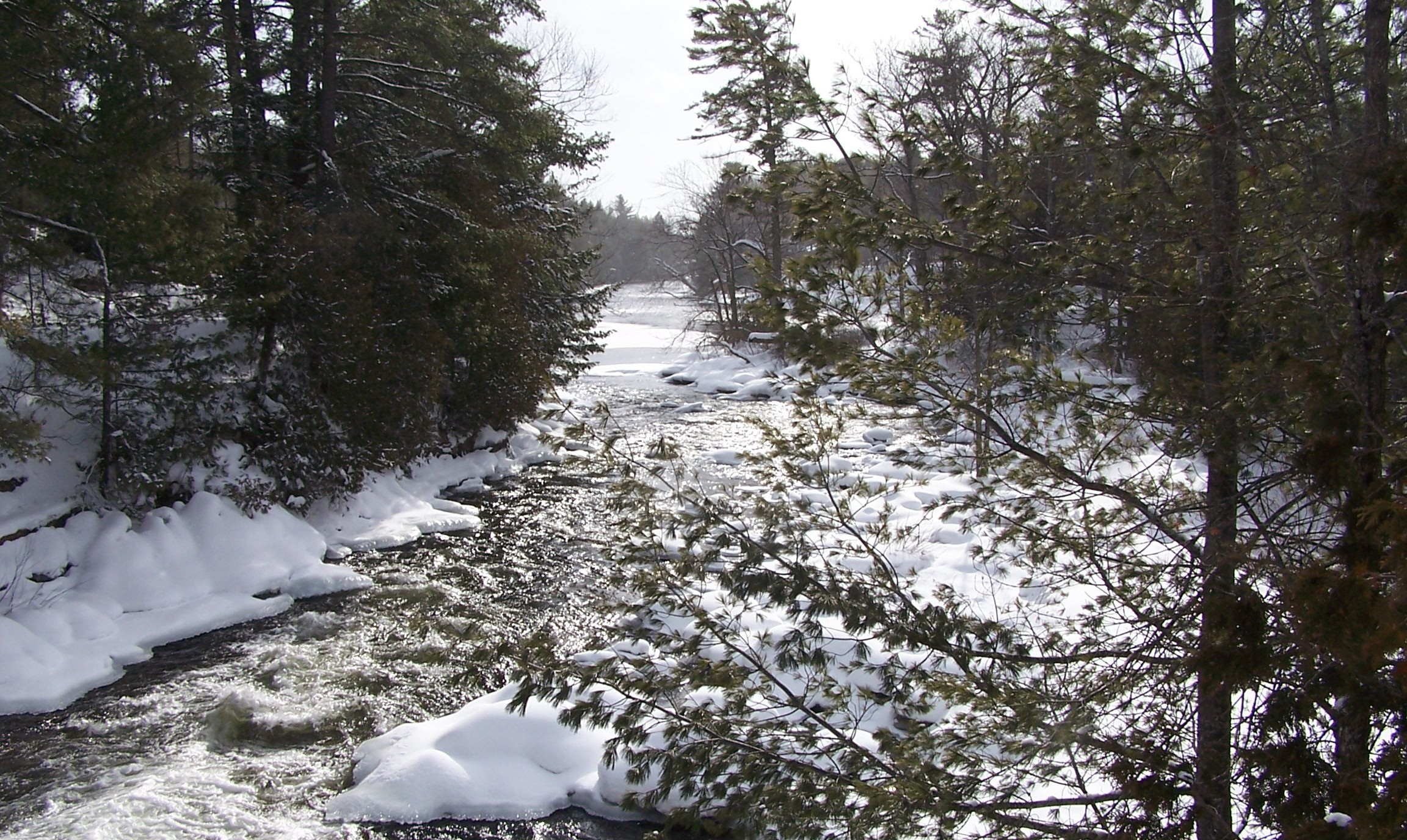
Elliot Falls, Norland, Ontario

- Large mural featuring a nature scene with animals and native people located on the largest building in town situated at the crossroads of Highway 35 and Kawartha Lakes Road 45
- Elliot Falls, a hydroelectric power generating station.
- "The falls" a falls and dam near the town centre. Recently a popular tourist spot during the summer for swimming and fishing, the dam has recently been converted into a power facility, with the addition of a powerhouse and a bypass gate to maintain water levels. This is a result of Parks Canada's issuing a license to Timber Run Hydropower Corporation, allowing the company to build at the site.
- The "Old School", the building which now houses the public library, used to also be the municipal building for the tri-township of Laxton-Digby-Longford. The Townships no longer exist since the amalgamation of Victoria County into the City of Kawartha Lakes.
- Municipal water system owned and operated by the City of Kawartha Lakes.
- Municipal wharf located on the Gull River below the falls and upstream of Shadow Lake. Boat access south to Coboconk.
- Several municipal waterfront parks.
- The Links at Monck's Landing Golf Club is located two kilometres northwest of Norland.
- The Norland Recreation Centre, located on the grounds of Ward Memorial Park, is a staple in the small community. The building is the main property for locals to host personal celebrations such as large parties and dances. During the winter months, the centre was formerly transformed into a public indoor natural ice skating rink until COKL environmentalists insulated the exterior walls preventing the rink from freezing, and during the summer months hosts the popular Norland Festival.
- The Norland Summer Festival, a popular summer festival in the community. One of the biggest events of the year, the festival is a weekend long ordeal in which locals and tourists can participate in multiple tournaments such as LOB ball and horseshoes, enjoy different food trucks and vendors, as well as watch a demolition derby.

The post office services locals with lockboxes and one rural route.

Norland was once mentioned on NBC's Late Night with Conan O'Brien when the show was in Toronto for a week, Mike Myers mentioned the village by name including the only still operating gas station and a resident of Norland.
