= Tarandowah Golfers Club =

- Interactive map of Tarandowah Golfers Club
- 42.9°N 80.94°W

Club information
- Location: Springfield, Ontario, Canada
- Established: 2007
- Type: Public
- Owner: HRS Inc.
- Total holes: 18
- Tournaments: Private and public
- Website: https://www.tarandowah.ca

Championship Course
- Designed by: Martin Hawtree
- Par: 70
- Length: 7,067 yards
- Course rating: 74.5

Tarandowah Golfers Club is an 18 hole golf course located in Springfield, Ontario, Canada.

The course was designed by British golf course architect Martin Hawtree and opened in 2007. Top100GolfCourses describes Tarandowah as Hawtree’s first Canadian design.

Tarandowah is known for firm bent-grass fairways, undulating greens, pot bunkers, fescue-lined playing corridors, and wind-influenced links-style conditions.

The course has received national recognition, including being ranked No. 68 in SCOREGolf’s 2024 Top 100 Courses in Canada and No. 31 in the Top Public Courses in Canada. It was also ranked No. 75 in its 2022 Top 100, No. 32 in 2023 Top Public Courses, and No. 40 in 2021 Top Public Courses.

Tarandowah has hosted competitive golf events and qualifiers, including a United States Amateur qualifier, an RBC Canadian Open local qualifier, and the Ontario Men’s and Senior Men’s Match Play Championship.
