= Martin Hawtree =

English golf course architect

- Born: 1947; England
- Citizenship: English
- Education: Wolverhampton Polytechnic
- Scientific career
- Fields: Golf course architect

Martin Grant Hawtree is a golf course architect, and director and chief architect at Hawtree Limited which is a family owned nationally known golf course architecture company. He has been head of Hawtree Limited since 1985. Hawtree worked with Donald Trump to create Trump International Golf Links in Scotland.

== Previous and current projects ==
- Ballybunion Golf Club (Ireland)
- Bearwood Lakes Golf Club (England)
- Dorset Golf & Country Club and Resort (England)
- Wynyard Golf Club (England)
- Lahinch (Ireland)
- Portmarnock (Ireland)
- Royal Birkdale (England)
- Sunningdale (England)
- Tarandowah Golfers Club (Canada)
- Turnberry (Scotland)
- Old Course at St Andrews (Scotland)
- Aboyne Golf Club (Scotland)
- Elisefarm Golf Club (Sweden)
- Vallda Golf & Country Club (Sweden)
- Lisbon Sports Club (Portugal)
- Les Aisses Golf (France)
- Rudding Park Golf Club (England)
- Naxhelet Golf Club (Belgium)
