= Vilamoura =

- Resort
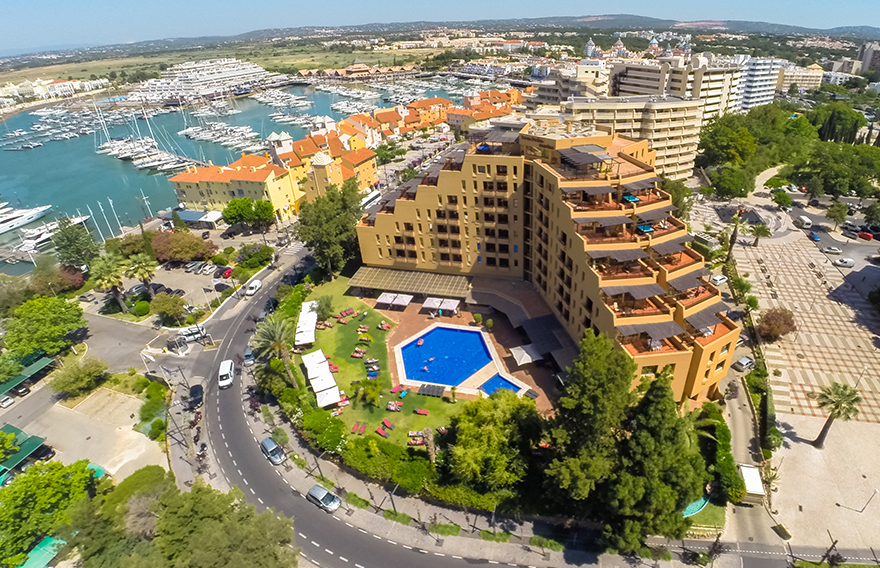
- A view of Vilamoura, its marina and luxury hotels

- Location within Portugal
- Coordinates: 37.0783°N 8.11745°W
- Country: Portugal
- Region: Algarve
- District: Faro
- Municipality: Loulé
- Time zone: UTC+00:00 (WET)
  - Summer (DST): UTC+01:00 (WEST)

Vilamoura is a coastal luxury resort in the Loulé municipality in Algarve, Portugal. It is one of the three corners of Algarve's Golden Triangle. Vilamoura comprises one of the largest single tourist complexes in Europe and with about 2,000 hectares of land. The nearest airport is in Faro.

The area previously hosted the annual Almond Blossom Cross Country competition between 1996 and 2003, and the same course was selected as the venue for the 2000 IAAF World Cross Country Championships.

== History ==
The resort developed around a small harbour, flanked by sandy beaches and close to the Roman ruins of Cerro da Vila. In Roman times this location was important in producing a fish paste known as "garum". The ruins also include the baths in which the mariners used to bathe.

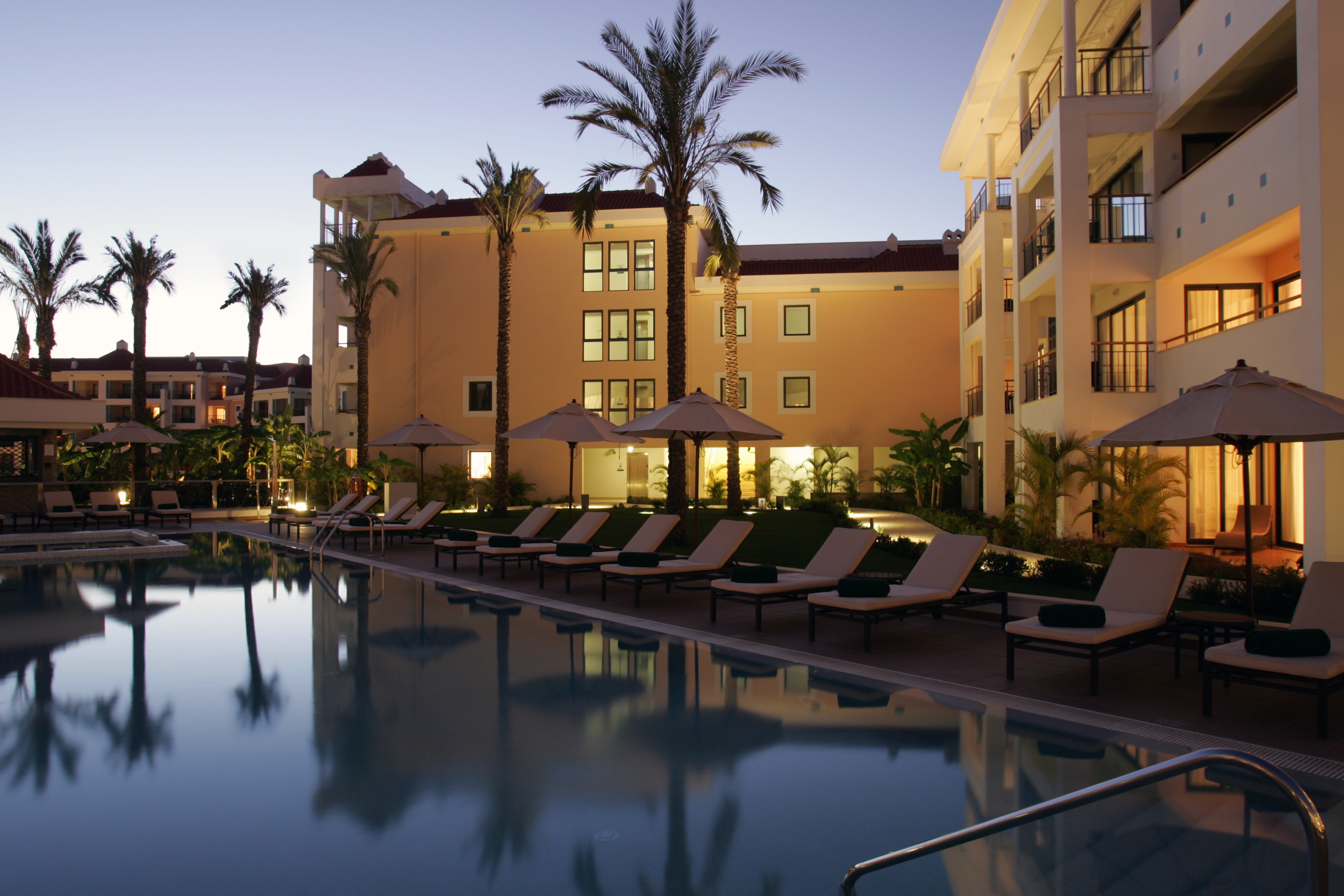
The luxury hotels in Vilamoura

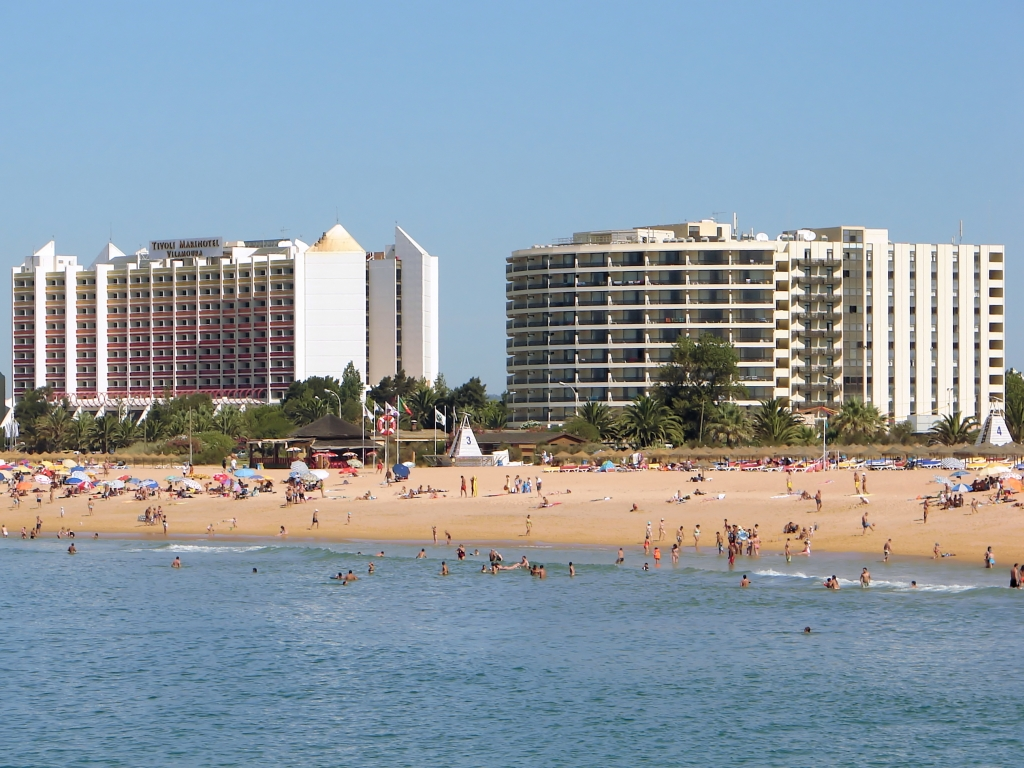
Marina Beach in Vilamoura, Algarve, Portugal

The resort was founded by Portuguese banker Cupertino de Miranda who, with the resort's management company Lusotur (now Lusort) started initial planning and building in 1966.

In 1996 Vilamoura (i.e. Lusotur) was acquired by Quinta do Lago's André Jordan. In 2004 the resort was purchased by the Spanish PRASA group.

== Facilities ==
Vilamoura has the largest marina in Portugal (inaugurated in 1974) with 845 berths, two beaches, an environmental park, a tennis and padel academy, a sports club, 5-star and 4-star hotels, tourist apartments, self-catering villas, night clubs, a casino, a horse riding and show jumping school and five golf courses.

Since 2016, the golf courses have been owned by Dom Pedro Golf as a part of the Dom Pedro Group, Vilamoura is a very popular destination for golfers all year round.

== Marina ==
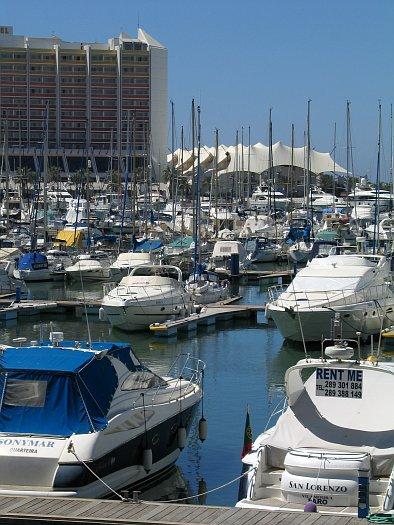
Marina of Vilamoura with yachts in Algarve, Portugal

At the heart of Vilamoura is the marina which has the capacity to berth over 1,000 vessels. The marina is surrounded by large hotels and luxury holiday homes as well as a medium-sized casino, numerous restaurants and vibrant bars. At the far corner of the marina, it is possible to charter boats for big game fishing. There are also facilities for jet skiing and parascending. Close by there are also a number of sports clubs and many night clubs. Tourism in Vilamoura is extensive and well-developed, with many different resorts with ratings from three to five stars. This is a substantially higher average than the surrounding areas, which have ratings varying from two to four. As a consequence of being mostly privately owned, the town is very opulently designed. The town and marina have an extensive variety of activities which are usually on Tuesdays, Thursdays and at weekends, including touring the local caves along the coastline (which are nearer to Albufeira than they are to Vilamoura). This cave tour is usually done on tour boats. The area also has two companies which operate trains-on-wheels for travel between resorts.

For the avid historians there is a preserved Roman site and museum providing an insight to the area's past. Originally a Roman fishing town, the ruins include baths in which the fishermen used to bathe.

The marina will be extended with Cidade Lacustre, the new project that Lusort will be developing in Vilamoura in the next few years.

== Nature ==
An area with 271 hectares in the western part of Vilamoura is listed by BirdLife International as an Important Bird Area, as it is an important site for Porphyrio porphyrio, and 20 other bird species during reproductive season, as well as an important number of transaharian passerines. Many different types of fish populate the marina among the boats and are often attracted to the colour changing lights under the vessels. This results in what's known as a 'fish disco'.
